= Nobody's Listening! =

- Andor episode
- Episode no.: Season 1 Episode 9
- Directed by: Toby Haynes
- Written by: Beau Willimon
- Cinematography by: Adriano Goldman
- Editing by: Simon Smith
- Original release date: November 2, 2022
- Running time: 47 minutes

Cast
- Nick Moss as Keysax; Duncan Pow as Ruescott Melshi; Brian Bovell as Jemboc; Clemens Schick as Ham; Josef Davies as Xaul; Christopher Fairbank as Ulaf; Rasaq Kukoyi as Birnok; Andy Serkis as Kino Loy; Wilf Scolding as Vanis Tigo; Lee Ross as Exmar Kloris; Mensah Bediak as Zinska; Bronte Carmichael as Leida; Anton Lesser as Major Lio Partagaz; Michael Jenn as Supervisor Lagret; Robert Emms as Supervisor Lonni Jung; Noof Ousellam as Corv; Kathryn Hunter as Eedy Karn; Alastair Mackenzie as Perrin Fertha; Ben Miles as Tay Kolma; Adrian Rawlins as Rhasiv; Joshua James as Dr. Gorst

Episode chronology
← Previous "Narkina 5"	Next → "One Way Out"

"Nobody's Listening!" is the ninth episode of the first season of the American streaming television series Andor, based on Star Wars created by George Lucas. It was written by Beau Willimon and directed by Toby Haynes.

The episode stars Diego Luna as Cassian Andor, who reprises his role from the Star Wars spinoff film, Rogue One (2016). Haynes was hired in September 2020 after a production delay due the COVID-19 pandemic, and Tony Gilroy joined the series as showrunner in early 2019, replacing Stephen Schiff. Both executive produce alongside Luna and Kathleen Kennedy.

"Nobody's Listening!" was released on Disney+ on November 2, 2022.

== Plot ==
Dedra Meero and an Imperial scientist named Dr. Gorst prepare to torture Bix Caleen by forcing her to listen to the sounds of massacred Dizonites, whose screams cause emotional traumatization. Bix quickly succumbs and begins screaming herself, becoming almost unresponsive and traumatized. Later, Meero visits her and asks where Cassian Andor is, then orders for her to be kept alive, but for Paak to be hanged in the square.

Meero shows her reports to Partagaz and her co-workers, revealing her beliefs of Andor's involvement in Aldhani. Although met with skepticism, she is allowed to continue and chooses to monitor Maarva Andor in case Andor is to return for her.

Syril Karn becomes obsessed with Meero as a chance to regain his old life, stalking her. He attempts to talk to her, but she is uncomfortable and leaves. Meero briefs her co-workers on their capture of a rebel pilot who has been forced to leak Kreegyr's plan to raid a power station. She decides to foul the pilot so Kreegyr will not discover the leak and believe he was killed in a ship malfunction.

Mon Mothma desperately tries to appeal to an unsympathetic Senate against their new legislations. Mothma and her daughter, Leida, meet with her cousin who is revealed to be Vel Sartha. Vel refuses to disclose her work with Luthen Rael, or her connections to the Aldhani heist. The next morning, Perrin Fertha asks Vel about her home life, and Mothma privately advises her cousin to pretend to be a spoiled rich girl.

Tay Kolma informs Mothma that the authorities will sooner or later notice a missing 400,000 credits, which she needs to cover up. Her only option is shady banker Davo Sculdun, but Mothma is shocked at the idea of getting involved with such a criminal.

Andor, under the alias Keef Girgo, continues working with his group of prisoners. However, one of his new friends, an elderly man named Ulaf, struggles with the intense manual labour. Andor attempts to break a water pipe in the workroom, and works with fellow prisoner Birnok to plan an escape. The prisoners communicate with those on other floors through hand signals. They discover that something has happened on Level 2, causing a panic. In their cells, Andor questions Kino Loy on the structure of the prison, which he refuses to answer, causing Andor to angrily shout "Nobody's Listening!"

The next day, the prisoners discover that 100 men were electrocuted to death on Level 2, and Loy asserts his control, dismissing it all as rumors. Whilst the group is working, Ulaf collapses although the group manage to hold him up when guards arrive. Andor, Ruescott Melshi and Loy help carry Ulaf to their cells, but he suffers a stroke on the way. A doctor, Rhasiv, arrives, sending away Melshi, and euthanizes Ulaf despite Loy's protests that he only has 40 shifts left. Rhasiv eventually admits that a man who had been released was returned back to Level 2, revealing that those who are freed are, in reality, just sent to a different prison. As Loy and Andor leave, the former tells the latter how many guards there are on each level, signaling his openness to escape.

== Production ==
=== Development ===
Disney CEO Bob Iger announced in February 2018 that there were several Star Wars series in development, and that November one was revealed as a prequel to the film Rogue One (2016). The series was described as a spy thriller show focused on the character Cassian Andor, with Diego Luna reprising his role from the film. Jared Bush originally developed the series, writing a pilot script and series bible for the project. By the end of November, Stephen Schiff was serving as showrunner and executive producer of the series. Tony Gilroy, who was credited as a co-writer on Rogue One and oversaw extensive reshoots for the film, joined the series by early 2019 when he discussed the first story details with Luna. Gilroy's involvement was revealed that October, when he was set to write the first episode, direct multiple episodes, and work alongside Schiff; Gilroy had officially replaced Schiff as showrunner by April 2020. Six weeks of pre-production for the series had taken place in the United Kingdom by then, but this was halted and production on the series delayed due to the COVID-19 pandemic. Pre-production had begun again by September ahead of a planned filming start the next month. At that time, Gilroy, who is based in New York, chose not to travel to the UK for production on the series due to the pandemic, and was therefore unable to direct the series' first episode. Instead, the UK-based Toby Haynes, who was already "high on the list" of potential directors for the series, was hired to direct the first three episodes. Gilroy would remain executive producer and showrunner. In December 2020, Luna was revealed to be executive producing the series.

The ninth episode, titled "Nobody's Listening!", was written by Beau Willimon.

=== Writing ===
Following the standalone episode "Announcement", Andor resumed its structure of a three-episode story arc. The third story arc features Andor being imprisoned within Narkina 5 and galvanizing his incarcerees into escaping. Director Toby Haynes decided to film the scene depicting Bix's torture through Dr. Gorst's sound device, which wasn't originally included in the script. He had intended it to be a homage to the scene depicting Princess Leia's torture in Star Wars (1977). He discussed the idea with Lucasfilm president and executive producer Kathleen Kennedy, who was present on set at the time, who had approved of it. Though sound editor David Acord was intent on creating potential sound designs for the scene, Gilroy had told him not to, saying "No, we don't want to hear it. The audience doesn't hear it, and let Adria Arjona carry that scene". Acord had felt that Gilroy's choice to do so was effective as he knew the audiences would speculate what Bix was hearing, commenting "our own imagination is going to be far more terrifying or interesting on an individual basis than anything that we would create". Actor Andy Serkis had conceived that his character, Kino Loy, was a man who worked as a firebrand union shop steward that had a family and advocated labor rights, but was traumatized by his Narkina 5 imprisonment. The final line of the episode features Loy responding to Andor's request to know the number of guards present as he wanted to orchestrate a prison breakout by saying "Never more than 12". Gilroy had enjoyed the line as he felt it was "causal and strong"

=== Casting ===
The episode stars Diego Luna as Cassian Andor, Kyle Soller as Syril Karn, Adria Arjona as Bix Caleen, Joplin Sibtain as Brasso, James McArdle as Timm Karlo, and Rupert Vansittart as Chief Hyne.

=== Filming ===
Filming began in London, England, at the end of November 2020, with the production based at Pinewood Studios. The series was filmed under the working title Pilgrim, and was the first live-action Star Wars series to not make use of the StageCraft digital background technology. Filming locations included Black Park in Buckinghamshire, England for the flashback scenes, as well as at Middle Peak Quarry in Derbyshire, England. The Narkina 5 scenes were filmed at the end of Andor's filming. Serkis had commented that "desensitization of wearing a paper suit and walking in bare feet was the most strange thing about the process" while Luna had agreed with Serkis' sentiments, saying that wearing the uniform had "made you feel like just another number" and that the prison set had become "metaphorically became a different thing for each actor — everyone found a way to hate the prison".

=== Music ===
Nicholas Britell composed the musical score for the episode. The episode's soundtrack was released in December 2022 as part of the third volume for the series.

Andor: Episode 9 (Original Soundtrack)
No.	Title	Length
1.	"Andor (Main Title Theme) – Episode 9"	0:44
2.	"Cousins"	1:25
3.	"Ulaf Fading"	0:54
4.	"Never More Than Twelve"	2:08
Total length:		5:11

== Release ==
"Nobody's Listening!" was released on Disney+ on November 2, 2022.

The episode, along with the rest of the first season of Andor was released on Ultra HD Blu-ray and Blu-ray by Walt Disney Studios Home Entertainment on April 30, 2024.

== Reception ==
=== Critical response ===
The review aggregator website Rotten Tomatoes reports a 100% approval rating, based on 21 reviews. The site's critical consensus reads, "Diego Luna and Andy Serkis make for a compelling pair in an Andor installment that methodically demonstrates how people are ground up by the Empire's oppressive system."
