= One Way Out (Andor) =

- Andor episode
- Episode no.: Season 1 Episode 10
- Directed by: Toby Haynes
- Written by: Beau Willimon
- Cinematography by: Adriano Goldman
- Editing by: Simon Smith
- Original release date: November 9, 2022
- Running time: 43 minutes

Cast
- Christopher Fairbank as Ulaf; Adrian Rawlins as Rhasiv; Mensah Bediak as Zinska; Andy Serkis as Kino Loy; Rasaq Kukoyi as Birnok; Brian Bovell as Jemboc; Tom Reed as Taga; Duncan Pow as Ruescott Melshi; Clemens Schick as Ham; Michael Jenn as Supervisor Lagret; Robert Emms as Supervisor Lonni Jung; Anton Lesser as Major Lio Partagaz; Pamela Nomvete as Jezzi; Noof Ousellam as Corv; Richard Dillane as Davo Sculdun; Ben Miles as Tay Kolma; Josh Herdman as Delivery Guard #1; Paul McEwan as Intake Warden

Episode chronology
← Previous "Nobody's Listening!"	Next → "Daughter of Ferrix"

"One Way Out" is the tenth episode of the first season of the American streaming television series Andor, based on Star Wars created by George Lucas. It was written by Beau Willimon and directed by Toby Haynes.

The episode stars Diego Luna as Cassian Andor, who reprises his role from the Star Wars spinoff film, Rogue One (2016). Haynes was hired in September 2020 after a production delay due the COVID-19 pandemic, and Tony Gilroy joined the series as showrunner in early 2019, replacing Stephen Schiff. Both executive produce alongside Luna and Kathleen Kennedy.

"One Way Out" was released on Disney+ on November 9, 2022. It received widespread critical acclaim, particularly for Andy Serkis' performance, and was named among the best television episodes of the year by many publications. In addition, the episode earned an Emmy Award nomination for Outstanding Writing for a Drama Series for Willimon.

== Plot ==
Kino Loy is hesitant to commit to Cassian Andor's escape plan, but soon realizes they have no choice as it is the only time the lift will be lowered - for the prisoner replacing Ulaf. He manages to convince his floor of prisoners that they need to escape. The next morning, they do their shifts as usual and Cassian cuts open a pipe that leaks water on the floor. The new prisoner arrives on the lift and, after staging a fight as a distraction, the prisoners attack the guards with machine parts. When the guards activate the electrified floor the water short-circuits their controls, and the prisoners overwhelm the guards and escape the room.

Groups of prisoners reach other floors, releasing them too whilst Kino and Cassian reach the control room. They take the terrified guards hostage, and Cassian convinces Kino to give a speech over the intercoms to inspire the rest of the prisoners to revolt. They charge through the prison, overwhelming the guards and making it to the bridge leading out to the sea that surrounds Narkina 5. Kino reveals he cannot swim and stays behind to die, whilst Cassian is knocked into the water before he can help.

Meanwhile, on Ferrix, Maarva Andor is growing weaker, yet is determined to help take down the Empire now running the planet. Cinta Kaz and Dedra Meero's associate Corv independently spy on Maarva with the aim of locating Cassian.

On Coruscant, Mon Mothma attempts to bargain with criminal Davo Sculdun, but is disgusted by his proposal to marry their children in accordance with Chandrilan tradition in favor of payment. She angrily sends him out, but Sculdun states that she will consider his offer.

Dedra and other ISB supervisors discover that her plan to frame a captured rebel pilot's death as an accident was successful, with the Empire now ready to ambush Anto Kreegyr's entire rebel cell. Kleya Marki receives a hidden message from her and Luthen Rael's Imperial contact, asking them to meet.

ISB supervisor Lonni Jung is revealed to be the Imperial contact, and communicates with Luthen through a headset hidden in a subterranean lift. Jung wants to resign and quit being a double agent for fear of his wife and newly-born daughter's lives. He warns Luthen of Meero, and reveals to him that the ISB captured a rebel pilot and is aware of Kreegyr's plans. Kreegyr's 50 men are walking into an ambush, but Luthen is willing to sacrifice them all to keep Jung's identity a secret, distressing him greatly.

The lift doors open, revealing Luthen to be there in person. He angrily chastises Jung for wanting to leave, despite Jung's offers of Meero, Spellhaus, and Ferrix. Jung realises he is trapped in his position and asks Luthen what he sacrifices for the cause. Furious, Luthen says he has given up his inner peace for a free galaxy he might never see before he dies, and he declares that Lonni will stay loyal to the cause.

Hours after their escape, Ruescott Melshi and Cassian run together across Narkina's beaches, with Imperial soldiers and ships surveying the area.

== Production ==
=== Development ===
Disney CEO Bob Iger announced in February 2018 that there were several Star Wars series in development, and that November one was revealed as a prequel to the film Rogue One (2016). The series was described as a spy thriller show focused on the character Cassian Andor, with Diego Luna reprising his role from the film. Jared Bush originally developed the series, writing a pilot script and series bible for the project. By the end of November, Stephen Schiff was serving as showrunner and executive producer of the series. Tony Gilroy, who was credited as a co-writer on Rogue One and oversaw extensive reshoots for the film, joined the series by early 2019 when he discussed the first story details with Luna. Gilroy's involvement was revealed that October, when he was set to write the first episode, direct multiple episodes, and work alongside Schiff; Gilroy had officially replaced Schiff as showrunner by April 2020. Six weeks of pre-production for the series had taken place in the United Kingdom by then, but this was halted and production on the series delayed due to the COVID-19 pandemic. Pre-production had begun again by September ahead of a planned filming start the next month. At that time, Gilroy, who is based in New York, chose not to travel to the UK for production on the series due to the pandemic, and was therefore unable to direct the series' first episode. Instead, the UK-based Toby Haynes, who was already "high on the list" of potential directors for the series, was hired to direct the first three episodes. Gilroy would remain executive producer and showrunner. In December 2020, Luna was revealed to be executive producing the series.

=== Writing ===
Following the standalone episode "Announcement", Andor resumed its structure of a three-episode story arc. The third story arc features Cassian being imprisoned within Narkina 5 and galvanizing his incarcerees into escaping. Actor Andy Serkis had interpreted the episode as being a turning point in Kino Loy's character arc, as he "finds that desire to act on behalf of others again, to serve others, to enable others to find their freedom, even though he knows ultimately it's not going to happen for him" after being oppressed by the Empire. Andor had known that Kino was the right person to galvanize the prisoners into escaping, and as such, encouraged him to deliver a speech to inspire them. Serkis had felt that it had reflected the similarities between Kino and Andor's characters, and interpreted Kino reusing Andor's words of "I'd rather die trying to take them down than die giving them what they want" as being his way of thanking Andor. The intercutting of footage that occurs during Kino's monologue was written into the script. Writer Beau Willimon had noted that the rallying cry of "One way out" could be interpreted both literally, as the only way of going through was escaping, or metaphorically, as the prisoners were chanting it together while also conveying that "you're seeing [that the] only one way out of the oppression, and the Empire, is collectively working together. With risk and sacrifice". He went on to describe it as the "bigger launcher for the rebellion". While writing the scene in which Kino reveals he can't swim, Willimon felt it exemplified that Kino's "greatest moment of triumph is also his greatest moment of tragedy" and included it after it was suggested from the writers' room, while director Toby Haynes had felt it was them saying "goodbye", who was surprised by it while reading the script. Kino's fate was deliberately written to be ambiguous, but Serkis and Haynes confirmed that though he was alive, his fate was unknown.

Commenting on Luthen Rael's sudden decision to sacrifice Kreegyr in order to protect his ISB informant Lonni Jung, Gilroy had described Luthen's decision as being that of a "chess player" who was "sacrificing a castle to protect his queen". He also added that Luthen would start to become more paranoid as he would be in more danger once he had begun to expand his schemes, saying "You're seeing the beginning of those issues in episode ten and in this tranche", going on to label his tactics as being accelerationist. As such, he felt Luthen's monologue had "comes out of that, and the whole concept of the engineer comes out of that and a whole new approach to the shabbiness and shittiness of it". Meanwhile, Willimon had described the scene between Lonni and Luthen as being "incredible", as Luthen had spoken honestly and was in "the process of sacrifice and risk", and observed that Lonni seeing Luthen's face was a "huge risk". The monologue had also highlighted the moral conflicts that Luthen and Mon Mothma had been facing when supporting the Rebellion movement. Willimon had noted that Mon Mothma was contemplating sacrificing her daughter's fate to support it while Luthen had "sacrificed everything", particularly love, to which Willimon remarked that it "is perhaps the biggest sacrifice you can make because a life without love is sunless".

=== Casting ===
The episode stars Diego Luna as Cassian Andor, Stellan Skarsgård as Luthen Rael, Genevieve O'Reilly as Mon Mothma, Denise Gough as Dedra Meero, Andy Serkis as Kino Loy (in his final appearance), Fiona Shaw as Maarva Andor, Varada Sethu as Cinta Kaz, Elizabeth Dulau as Kleya Marki, Richard Dillane as Davo Sculdun, Robert Emms as Lonni Jung, and Duncan Pow as Ruescott Melshi.

=== Filming ===
Filming began in London, England, at the end of November 2020, with the production based at Pinewood Studios. The series was filmed under the working title Pilgrim, and was the first live-action Star Wars series to not make use of the StageCraft digital background technology. Filming locations included Black Park in Buckinghamshire, England for the flashback scenes, as well as at Middle Peak Quarry in Derbyshire, England. The Narkina 5 scenes were shot at the end of Andor's filming. The final scene of the prison break, in which the prisoners jump from the platform into the ocean and Kino Loy states he can't swim, was filmed on the final day. During Kino's monologue, Serkis had wanted to balance his performance in order to ensure it had come across as authentic rather than feeling scripted. As such, he had described Kino "trying to find his mojo" following Andor saying "Is that all you got?" as being a "genuine sort of thing". Haynes had filmed his monologue in single takes, estimating that they had filmed five of them. However, he felt that Serkis had "nailed it" on the second take, saying that "the energy, the emotion, that all came from take two" and that the rest of the takes had been to correct minor issues. He also said that it took Serkis some time to figure out the perfect tone to deliver Kino's line, "I can't swim", until he decided to perform it in a "serene way". While filming Luthen Rael's monologue, actor Stellan Skarsgård had performed the scene 10 times "in a row, very fast, right on top of each other" until both he and Gilroy was satisfied with the final outcome.

=== Music ===
Nicholas Britell composed the musical score for the episode. The episode's soundtrack was released in December 2022 as part of the third volume for the series.

Andor: Episode 10 (Original Soundtrack)
No.	Title	Length
1.	"Andor (Main Title Theme) – Episode 10"	1:18
2.	"Make It Look Good"	1:44
3.	"One Way Out – Parts 1-4"	1:20
4.	"One Way Out – Parts 5-7"	1:51
5.	"One Way Out – Part 8"	2:24
6.	"My Name Is Kino Loy"	4:15
7.	"Heroes"	1:08
Total length:		14:00

== Release ==
"One Way Out" was released on Disney+ on November 9, 2022.

The episode, along with the rest of the first season of Andor was released on Ultra HD Blu-ray and Blu-ray by Walt Disney Studios Home Entertainment on April 30, 2024.

== Reception ==
=== Critical response ===
The review aggregator website Rotten Tomatoes reports 100% approval rating, based on 21 reviews. The site's critical consensus reads, "Andy Serkis unleashes his fury and steals the show in "One Way Out", a galvanizing climax to the "Narkina 5" arc." The episode was ranked by many publications as one of the best television episodes of the year. The performances of Andy Serkis and Stellen Skarsgård were both highly praised, with Simon Cardy of IGN praising Serkis as "magnetic throughout...with his bellows and determined stares." Ben Lindberg of The Ringer cited Luthen's speech as "one of the most affecting sci-fi soliloquies since Rutger Hauer reminisced about tears in rain."

=== Accolades ===
At the American Cinema Editors Awards 2023, Simon Smith's work on the episode won the award for Best Edited Drama Series. At the 2022 British Society of Cinematographers Awards, Adriano Goldman's work on the episode was nominated for Best Cinematography in a Television Drama. At the 75th Primetime Emmy Awards, Beau Willimon's work on the episode was nominated for Outstanding Writing for a Drama Series.
