= Daughter of Ferrix =

- Andor episode
- Episode no.: Season 1 Episode 11
- Directed by: Benjamin Caron
- Written by: Tony Gilroy
- Cinematography by: Damián García
- Editing by: Yan Miles
- Original release date: November 16, 2022
- Running time: 43 minutes

Cast
- Duncan Pow as Ruescott Melshi; Pamela Nomvete as Jezzi; Joplin Sibtain as Brasso; Victor Perez as Rashi; Noof Ousellam as Corv; Wilf Scolding as Vanis Tigo; Nick Moss as Keysax; Neil Bell as Time Grappler; Bronte Carmichael as Leida; Kathryn Hunter as Eedy Karn; Alex Ferns as Sergeant Linus Mosk; Forest Whitaker as Saw Gerrera; Zubin Varla as Xanwan

Episode chronology
← Previous "One Way Out"	Next → "Rix Road"

"Daughter of Ferrix" is the eleventh episode of the first season of the American streaming television series Andor, based on Star Wars created by George Lucas. It was written by Tony Gilroy and directed by Benjamin Caron.

The episode stars Diego Luna as Cassian Andor, who reprises his role from the Star Wars spinoff film, Rogue One (2016). Toby Haynes was hired in September 2020 after a production delay due to the COVID-19 pandemic, and Gilroy joined the series as showrunner in early 2019, replacing Stephen Schiff. Both executive produce alongside Luna and Kathleen Kennedy.

"Daughter of Ferrix" was released on Disney+ on November 16, 2022.

== Plot ==
Cassian Andor and fellow prisoner Ruescott Melshi manage to evade capture by holding onto the side of a cliff. They explore the desolate planet and are caught in a trap trying to steal a ship belonging to a pair of Narkinian fishers. The fishers, recognizing Andor and Melshi as prisoners and angry with the Empire for destroying the planet's wildlife, offer them a ride to Niamos.

Maarva Andor passes away, and Brasso attempts to comfort a grieving B2EMO. Brasso carries her body away, observed by a crowd including disguised rebel Cinta Kaz and disguised Imperial Corv. Dedra Meero orders the Imperials on Ferrix to allow a limited funeral to proceed so that they can use it as bait for Andor. Sergeant Mosk tells Syril Karn about the funeral, and Karn decides to attend the funeral to catch Andor. A traumatized and imprisoned Bix Caleen is taken back into torture to see if she knew Anto Kreegyr.

Vel Sartha visits Luthen Rael's antiques shop, confronting his assistant Kleya Marki. Marki is angry at Vel for breaking protocol, but agrees to tell Rael of Maarva's death. Vel returns to the house of her cousin Mon Mothma and sees Mothma's daughter, Leida, partaking in an old courtship ritual in retaliation to her mother's objection against the Empire. Mothma confides in Vel about the Empire closing in on her missing money, grappling with the inevitability of her capture.

Rael goes to Segra Milo and discovers Saw Gerrera has changed his mind and now wishes to join Kreegyr on his mission. Rael admits that the ISB are aware of Kreegyr's plans, which is why he can no longer allow Gerrera to join him. Gerrera's paranoia quickly takes over as he demands which one of his team is secretly a spy for Rael. He eventually calms down, and reluctantly agrees to sacrifice Kreegyr.

Rael contacts Marki and begins to fly back to Coruscant when he is confronted by an Imperial ship, a Cantwell-Class Arrestor Cruiser named in honor of Star Wars designer Colin Cantwell, that demands his registration. Rael tricks the cruiser into increasing the power of its tractor beam, then he releases projectiles out the rear of his ship which the tractor beam pulls toward the cruiser at high velocity causing the destruction of the tractor dish. After the tractor beam fails, he destroys the final two TIE fighters with lasers on the sides of his ship.

On Niamos, Andor retrieves his belongings and contacts his friend Xanwan on Ferrix, discovering his adoptive mother's death. He decides to return to Ferrix, whilst Melshi leaves to spread the word of rebellion. They part ways, hoping to meet again.

== Production ==
=== Development ===
Disney CEO Bob Iger announced in February 2018 that there were several Star Wars series in development, and that November one was revealed as a prequel to the film Rogue One (2016). The series was described as a spy thriller show focused on the character Cassian Andor, with Diego Luna reprising his role from the film. Jared Bush originally developed the series, writing a pilot script and series bible for the project. By the end of November, Stephen Schiff was serving as showrunner and executive producer of the series. Tony Gilroy, who was credited as a co-writer on Rogue One and oversaw extensive reshoots for the film, joined the series by early 2019 when he discussed the first story details with Luna. Gilroy's involvement was revealed that October, when he was set to write the first episode, direct multiple episodes, and work alongside Schiff; Gilroy had officially replaced Schiff as showrunner by April 2020. Six weeks of pre-production for the series had taken place in the United Kingdom by then, but this was halted and production on the series delayed due to the COVID-19 pandemic. Pre-production had begun again by September ahead of a planned filming start the next month. At that time, Gilroy, who is based in New York, chose not to travel to the UK for production on the series due to the pandemic, and was therefore unable to direct the series' first episode. Instead, the UK-based Toby Haynes, who was already "high on the list" of potential directors for the series, was hired to direct the first three episodes. Gilroy would remain executive producer and showrunner. In December 2020, Luna was revealed to be executive producing the series.

=== Writing ===
Following the Narkina 5 prison arc, the final two episodes contained a connected story arc. When writing the scene in which Ruescott Melshi and Andor depart, Gilroy had decided that Melshi would not be coming with Andor to Ferrix, and also knew that Melshi would be motivated to be the "heroic version of that, which is, people have to know what he just went through", noting that all the characters had been "radicalized" following their incarceration on Narkina 5. He knew that while writing the scene, his first impulse was that the two characters could not be together. Gilroy was also satisfied that director Benjamin Caron had made the scene "feel like the end of Rogue One" (2016).

=== Casting ===
The episode stars Diego Luna as Cassian Andor, Kyle Soller as Syril Karn, Adria Arjona as Bix Caleen, Joplin Sibtain as Brasso, James McArdle as Timm Karlo, and Rupert Vansittart as Chief Hyne.

=== Filming ===
Filming began in London, England, at the end of November 2020, with the production based at Pinewood Studios. The series was filmed under the working title Pilgrim, and was the first live-action Star Wars series to not make use of the StageCraft digital background technology. Filming locations included Black Park in Buckinghamshire, England for the flashback scenes, as well as at Middle Peak Quarry in Derbyshire, England.

=== Music ===
Nicholas Britell composed the musical score for the episode. The episode's soundtrack was released in December 2022 as part of the third volume for the series.

Andor: Episode 11 (Original Soundtrack)
No.	Title	Length
1.	"Andor (Main Title Theme) – Episode 11"	0:43
2.	"Tell Me They're Leaving/Bee"	1:27
3.	"The Daughters of Ferrix"	1:43
4.	"Dewi and Freedi Pamular"	0:54
5.	"Full Fondor"	1:27
6.	"Your Mother Is Dead"	3:42
Total length:		9:56

== Release ==
"Daughter of Ferrix" was released on Disney+ on November 16, 2022.

The episode, along with the rest of the first season of Andor was released on Ultra HD Blu-ray and Blu-ray by Walt Disney Studios Home Entertainment on April 30, 2024.

== Reception ==
=== Critical response ===
The review aggregator website Rotten Tomatoes reports a 94% approval rating, based on 17 reviews. Writing for The Escapist, the episode was described as one where Andor appeared to be "showing off", leaning into traditional Star Wars spectacle that had been absent from the show up to that point, particularly praising the space battle sequence involving Luthen's ship. Tell Tale TV praised the episode for navigating between tension and heartbreak, calling Genevieve O'Reilly's performance as Mon Mothma brilliant, and noting the grief of droid B2-EMO as among the episode's most emotional moments. The site's critical consensus reads, "Treating fans to a terrific dogfight while also breaking their hearts with a stern reminder about the cost of rebellion, Andor continues to impress."
