= Rix Road =

- Andor episode
- Episode no.: Season 1 Episode 12
- Directed by: Benjamin Caron
- Written by: Tony Gilroy
- Cinematography by: Damián García
- Editing by: Yan Miles
- Original release date: November 23, 2022
- Running time: 57 minutes

Cast
- Muhannad Bhaier as Wilmon; Noof Ousellam as Corv; Wilf Scolding as Vanis Tigo; Zubin Varla as Xanwan; Joplin Sibtain as Brasso; Victor Perez as Rashi; Raymond Anum as Nurchi; Abhin Galeya as Salman Paak; Alastair Mackenzie as Perrin Fertha; Lee Ross as Exmar Kloris; Gary Beadle as Clem Andor; Kieran O'Brien as Pegla; Alex Lawther as Karis Nemik (voice); Nick Moss as Keysax; Ben Bailey Smith as Lieutenant Supervisor Blevin; Michael Jenn as Supervisor Lagret; Robert Emms as Supervisor Lonni Jung; Lucy Russell as Supervisor Grandi; Anton Lesser as Major Lio Partagaz; Alex Ferns as Sergeant Linus Mosk; Neil Bell as Time Grappler; Pamela Nomvete as Jezzi; Bronte Carmichael as Leida; Richard Dillane as Davo Sculdun; Rosalind Halstead as Runai Sculdun

Episode chronology
← Previous "Daughter of Ferrix"	Next → "One Year Later"

"Rix Road" is the twelfth episode and season finale of the first season of the American streaming television series Andor, based on Star Wars created by George Lucas. It was written by Tony Gilroy and directed by Benjamin Caron.

The episode stars Diego Luna as Cassian Andor, who reprises his role from the Star Wars spinoff film, Rogue One (2016). Toby Haynes was hired in September 2020 after a production delay due the COVID-19 pandemic, and Gilroy joined the series as showrunner in early 2019, replacing Stephen Schiff. Both act as executive producers alongside Luna and Kathleen Kennedy.

"Rix Road" was released on Disney+ on November 23, 2022. It received critical acclaim and earned three Emmy Award nominations, including Outstanding Directing for a Drama Series for Caron.

== Plot ==
Paak's son, Wilmon, assembles a machine after his father is executed. Meanwhile, Stormtroopers cover the streets of Ferrix, preparing for Maarva Andor's funeral procession. Dedra Meero arrives on Ferrix and meets with Corv, whilst Brasso learns from Xanwan of Andor's arrival. Vel Sartha arrives on Ferrix, meeting with her girlfriend Cinta Kaz, who is solely focused on locating Andor. A disguised Andor arrives on Ferrix, and discovers of his friend Bix Caleen's capture by the Empire. He resolves to use the funeral as a distraction to rescue her, listening to the late Nemik's manifesto. He meets with a disguised Brasso.

Mon Mothma argues with her husband, Fertha, about his hidden gambling addictions. In reality, she is covering for her money transfers by blaming her husband, in the presence of her driver, Kloris. Kloris, an Imperial spy, later reports this to ISB officer Blevin. The Imperial counterattack on Anto Kreegyr is successful, killing him and his entire rebel troupe.

In defiance of the Empire's permit, the funeral procession starts early and with far more people than allowed. Present are Rael, Cinta, Vel, Meero, Corv, Syril Karn and Sergeant Mosk, while Andor watches from afar and a traumatized Bix listens from where she is being held captive. Nurchi, who Andor owes money to, negotiates a deal with Corv to give up Andor. Andor is forced to flee into the sewers, eventually making his way to Bix, although she refuses at first to leave with him due to her traumatization. B2EMO plays a holographic recording of Maarva before her death. In it, she gives a speech encouraging the public to fight against their oppressors and when a captain overturns B2EMO to stop it, a riot ensues. Although at first stopped by Imperial troops with riot shields, Wilmon throws his machine – revealed to be a bomb – into Imperial lines. Its detonation knocks a crate of grenades, causing an enormous chain of explosions and prompting the imperials to begin shooting protestors. Meero is overwhelmed by an angry mob and almost beaten to death before Karn saves her. Corv follows Cinta but she stabs him to death.

Brasso, B2EMO, Pegla and Wilmon reach a ship. Andor arrives with Bix, but bids them farewell after getting Bix on board, promising to see them again. A despondent Mosk slumps in a street corner. Vel and Cinta are reunited, and Vel becomes worried about the former having blood on her, however Cinta coldly tells her it is not her blood and begins packing.

On Coruscant, Mon Mothma introduces her daughter Leida to Davo Sculdun's son, as the first step in a betrothal ritual.

Rael reaches his ship and prepares to flee Ferrix when Andor confronts him in the cockpit. Andor hands him his blaster, and tells Rael to either kill or recruit him. In response, Rael merely smiles.

In a post-credits scene, droids assemble the machinery produced by the Narkina 5 prisoners on the firing dish of the Death Star.

== Production ==
=== Development ===
Disney CEO Bob Iger announced in February 2018 that there were several Star Wars series in development, and later in November one was revealed as a prequel to the film Rogue One (2016). The series was described as a spy thriller show focused on the character Cassian Andor, with Diego Luna reprising his role from the film. Jared Bush originally developed the series, writing a pilot script and series bible for the project. By the end of November, Stephen Schiff was serving as showrunner and executive producer of the series. Tony Gilroy, who was credited as a co-writer on Rogue One and oversaw extensive reshoots for the film, joined the series by early 2019 when he discussed the first story details with Luna. Gilroy's involvement was revealed that October, when he was set to write the first episode, direct multiple episodes, and work alongside Schiff; Gilroy had officially replaced Schiff as showrunner by April 2020. Six weeks of pre-production for the series had taken place in the United Kingdom by then, but this was halted and production on the series delayed due to the COVID-19 pandemic. Pre-production had begun again by September ahead of a planned filming start the next month. At that time, Gilroy, who is based in New York, chose not to travel to the UK for production on the series due to the pandemic, and was therefore unable to direct the series' first episode. Instead, the UK-based Toby Haynes, who was already "high on the list" of potential directors for the series, was hired to direct the first three episodes. Gilroy would remain executive producer and showrunner. In December 2020, Luna was revealed to be executive producing the series.

The twelfth episode, titled "Rix Road", was written by Tony Gilroy.

=== Writing ===
Gilroy had envisioned the sequence depicting Maarva's funeral becoming an uprising early on during production. He had first been intrigued with the idea after making a similar narrative choice with Mads Mikkelsen's hologram in Rogue One (2016). He had described her eulogy as being "somewhere between an IRA funeral and a second-line New Orleans funeral" and intended for its presence to surprise audiences. Explaining Luthen's presence in the scene, Gilroy had described it as being "another corner of the farm he's [Luthen] trying to grow".

Gilroy initially intended for Maarva's speech to end with her proclaiming "Fuck the Empire" to the crowd. Gilroy even wrote a "Legal Brief" explaining why he thought the line was important after its use being allowed by Disney was questioned. However, Disney informed the Andor writing staff that they could not use the line, it was changed to "Fight the Empire".

Regarding Mon Mothma's fabrication of her husband's gambling debts and her subsequent decision to marry her daughter Leida to the Sculdun family, Gilroy had described Mothma as not "having a lot of good choices" as she was being heavily scrutinized. However, he had also interpreted that Mothma's decision would be "assuaged in a very hopefully interesting and weird way by the fact that her daughter is becoming sort of orthodox, old school Chandrilan and going back to these old ways and confusing everything". Vel's reaction to her decisions had been described by Gilroy as her realizing "the scale of it" and calling the overall choices made a "dramatic card that has real utility in a lot of different places, which is the stakes for a lot of people" and subsequently noting the issue of collateral damages associated with her actions. He said that Mothma had performed the latter action in order to "cover all the tracks".

=== Casting ===
The episode stars Diego Luna as Cassian Andor, Kyle Soller as Syril Karn, Adria Arjona as Bix Caleen, Joplin Sibtain as Brasso, James McArdle as Timm Karlo, and Rupert Vansittart as Chief Hyne.

=== Filming ===
Filming began in London, England, at the end of November 2020, with the production based at Pinewood Studios. The series was filmed under the working title Pilgrim, and was the first live-action Star Wars series to not make use of the StageCraft digital background technology. Filming locations included Black Park in Buckinghamshire, England for the flashback scenes, as well as at Middle Peak Quarry in Derbyshire, England. Gilroy also instructed that the actors on-screen play their instruments during Maarva's funeral.

=== Music ===
Nicholas Britell composed the musical score for the episode. The episode's soundtrack was released in December 2022 as part of the third volume for the series. Gilroy had collaborated with Britell two years prior to the filming in order to create music for Marva's funeral in Ferrix, resulting in the composition of a seven-minute piece. Britell had described the piece as being "a piece that's not just about Maarva or Cassian, it's about this people, and this is a tradition that all of them would know and that all of them would naturally connect with".

Andor: Episode 12 (Original Soundtrack)
No.	Title	Length
1.	"Andor (Main Title Theme) – Episode 12"	0:58
2.	"Dedra in Ferrix"	1:32
3.	"Come Away From the Window"	1:20
4.	"Clem's Stone"	1:55
5.	"Manifesto"	2:13
6.	"Forming Up/Unto Stone We Are"	4:43
7.	"Eulogy"	4:17
8.	"Battle"	1:38
9.	"Cassian Will Find Us"	2:32
10.	"Kill Me"	1:25
11.	"The Rebellion Suite"	4:00
Total length:		26:33

== Release ==
"Rix Road" was released on Disney+ on November 23, 2022.

The episode, along with the rest of the first season of Andor was released on Ultra HD Blu-ray and Blu-ray by Walt Disney Studios Home Entertainment on April 30, 2024.

== Reception ==
=== Critical response ===
The review aggregator website Rotten Tomatoes reports a 100% approval rating, based on 22 reviews. The site's critical consensus reads, "Doling out a series of challenges to its raggedy band of rebels, Andor's season finale is a strong capper to one of the strongest outings yet from a galaxy far, far away."

=== Accolades ===
At the Art Directors Guild Awards 2022, Luke Hull's work on the episode was nominated for Excellence in Production Design for a One-Hour Fantasy Single-Camera Series. At the 3rd Hollywood Critics Association TV Awards, Benjamin Caron's and Tony Gilroy's work on the episode was nominated for Best Directing in a Streaming Series, Drama and Best Writing in a Streaming Series, Drama, respectively. At the 75th Primetime Emmy Awards, Caron's, Damián García's, and Nicholas Britell's work on the episode was nominated for Outstanding Directing for a Drama Series, Outstanding Cinematography for a Series (One Hour), and Outstanding Music Composition for a Series (Original Dramatic Score), respectively.
