= Aldhani =

- Andor episode
- Episode no.: Season 1 Episode 4
- Directed by: Susanna White
- Written by: Dan Gilroy
- Cinematography by: Frank Lamm
- Editing by: Hazel Baillie
- Original release date: September 28, 2022
- Running time: 47 minutes

Cast
- Anton Lesser as Major Lio Partagaz; Ben Bailey Smith as Lieutenant Supervisor Blevin; Robert Emms as Supervisor Lonni Jung; Michael Jenn as Supervisor Lagret; Lucy Russell as Supervisor Grandi; Rupert Vansittart as Chief Hyne; Alex Ferns as Sergeant Linus Mosk; Alex Lawther as Karis Nemik; Ebon Moss-Bachrach as Arvel Skeen; Gershwyn Eustache Jnr as Taramyn Barcona; Kathryn Hunter as Eedy Karn; Lee Ross as Exmar Kloris; Sule Rimi as Lieutenant Gorn; Alastair Mackenzie as Perrin Fertha

Episode chronology
← Previous "Reckoning"	Next → "The Axe Forgets"

"Aldhani" is the fourth episode of the first season of the American streaming television series Andor, based on Star Wars created by George Lucas. It was written by Dan Gilroy and directed by Susanna White.

The episode stars Diego Luna as Cassian Andor, who reprises his role from the Star Wars spinoff film, Rogue One (2016). Toby Haynes was hired in September 2020 after a production delay due the COVID-19 pandemic, and Tony Gilroy joined the series as showrunner in early 2019, replacing Stephen Schiff. Both executive produce alongside Luna and Kathleen Kennedy.

"Aldhani" was released on Disney+ on September 28, 2022, and introduces the characters Mon Mothma (Genevieve O'Reilly) and Dedra Meero (Denise Gough), as well as the Imperial Security Bureau.

== Plot ==
Luthen Rael takes Cassian Andor to the planet Aldhani, asking him to join a robbery mission. Andor is reluctant but eventually agrees, choosing the pseudonym of 'Clem' after his deceased adoptive father. Clem and Rael meet rebel leader Vel Sartha who disapproves of Clem's involvement, but eventually relents under the condition he doesn't tell anyone he was hired. Rael leaves whilst Clem and Sartha embark on a long trek to where the rebels are disguised as farmers.

Clem meets the rebels, consisting of Sartha's stoic medic Cinta Kaz, ex-stormtrooper Taramyn Barcona, unfriendly Arvel Skeen and young idealist Karis Nemik. They meet their Empire contact Lieutenant Gorn, who is immediately distrusting of Clem. Sartha briefs the team on the Eye of Aldhani, a large meteor shower which will provide them cover for an attack on the Empire dam. Nemik is extremely optimistic, whilst Clem is skeptical that her plan will work.

Meanwhile, at the Empire's capital, the planet Coruscant, Supervisor Dedra Meero attends a meeting discussing their widening surveillance abilities. Meero attempts to question her co-worker Blevin about Ferrix, but he only discloses that they retrieved the stolen Starpath unit. Meero attempts to convince their superior, Major Partagaz, that there is a rebel alliance, but she does not have enough evidence.

Blevin fires Syril Karn and Mosk, as well as their boss, Chief Inspector Hyne, for the Ferrix incident and reveals Pre-Mor are being removed with the Empire being placed in full control of the planet. Karn, jobless, reunites with his disapproving mother.

Meanwhile, Rael takes his disguise as a wealthy Empire-supporting antiques dealer alongside his associate Kleya Marki. Senator Mon Mothma meets with them under the guise of buying an antique, in reality she is struggling to hide the money she has spent funding his operations. Mothma's husband, Fertha, does not support her ideals and invites two people she is campaigning against to dinner.

== Production ==
=== Development ===
Disney CEO Bob Iger announced in February 2018 that there were several Star Wars series in development, and that November one was revealed as a prequel to the film Rogue One (2016). The series was described as a spy thriller show focused on the character Cassian Andor, with Diego Luna reprising his role from the film. Jared Bush originally developed the series, writing a pilot script and series bible for the project. By the end of November, Stephen Schiff was serving as showrunner and executive producer of the series. Tony Gilroy, who was credited as a co-writer on Rogue One and oversaw extensive reshoots for the film, joined the series by early 2019 when he discussed the first story details with Luna. Gilroy's involvement was revealed that October, when he was set to write the first episode, direct multiple episodes, and work alongside Schiff; Gilroy had officially replaced Schiff as showrunner by April 2020. Six weeks of pre-production for the series had taken place in the United Kingdom by then, but this was halted and production on the series delayed due to the COVID-19 pandemic. Pre-production had begun again by September ahead of a planned filming start the next month. At that time, Gilroy, who is based in New York, chose not to travel to the UK for production on the series due to the pandemic, and was therefore unable to direct the series' first episode. Instead, the UK-based Toby Haynes, who was already "high on the list" of potential directors for the series, was hired to direct the first three episodes. Gilroy would remain executive producer and showrunner. In December 2020, Luna was revealed to be executive producing the series.

The fourth episode, titled "Aldhani", was written by Dan Gilroy.

=== Writing ===
The writing was structured so that a story arc is contained in every three episodes. The second set of three episodes features Luthen Rael recruiting Andor for a heist on an Imperial payroll vault in the planet of Aldhani. The episode also expands its scope as it gradually introduces its full ensemble cast, particularly by introducing a new storyline featuring Mon Mothma. However, Mothma and Andor do not initially meet, with Gilroy saying that "They do have intersection—but they do not meet." Gilroy had further gone on to compare her to Nancy Pelosi, noting that she had been attempting to use her political influence in the Galactic Senate to prevent the Empire from gaining power. He had also commented that "in many ways her story is the most tense story in the whole show, because she has to do everything in the open". Actress Genevieve O'Reilly had discussed elements of Mothma's backstory with Gilroy, noting that she had been a Senator since she was 16 years old, while Gilroy was interested in contemplating how her political career and marriage influenced her life. In the episode, Mothma's husband, Perrin Fertha, responds with "Must everything be boring and sad?" when Mothma protests his requests to host parties for Imperial figures whom she argues with in the Senate. She felt the line was representative of "how much of Empire is also within the marriage" and the Empire's prevalent influence on her life, which had made her attempts to covertly aid the Rebellion difficult. Additionally, O'Reilly felt that the episode had overall depicted more of Mothma's life and revealed her to be a "deeply complicated woman" who would eventually "lean in to the seed of her own rebellion".

Actor Kyle Soller had collaborated with actress Kathryn Hunter, who portrays Syril Karn's mother, Eedy Karn, in developing elements of a potential backstory. Soller said they decided that Karn's father had "left really early on, in a real acrimonious, horrible way", which had served as a "launchpad for how Eedy then parents Syril, which is by being wronged and her anger and grief and disappointment and frustration of him leaving just got filtered into Syril". Hunter had also noted that Eedy had difficulty in reaching the position she had been in, and set high expectations Syril as she had wanted him to succeed. She also commented that Eedy was "probably a thwarted woman herself, and she's overcompensating with her son".

=== Casting ===
The episode stars Diego Luna as Cassian Andor, Kyle Soller as Syril Karn, Adria Arjona as Bix Caleen, Joplin Sibtain as Brasso, James McArdle as Timm Karlo, and Rupert Vansittart as Chief Hyne.

=== Filming ===
Filming began in London, England, at the end of November 2020, with the production based at Pinewood Studios. The series was filmed under the working title Pilgrim, and was the first live-action Star Wars series to not make use of the StageCraft digital background technology. Filming locations included Black Park in Buckinghamshire, England for the flashback scenes, as well as at Middle Peak Quarry in Derbyshire, England. Scenes for Aldhani were filmed on-location in Glen Tilt, Perthshire, Scotland and the Scottish Highlands. The Imperial stronghold depicted in the episode was a model of the Cruachan Power Station.

=== Music ===
Nicholas Britell composed the musical score for the episode. The episode's soundtrack was released in October 2022 as part of the first volume for the series.

Andor: Episode 4 (Original Soundtrack)
No.	Title	Length
1.	"Andor (Main Title Theme) – Episode 4"	0:47
2.	"I Came for You"	2:40
3.	"ISB"	0:41
4.	"Blue Kyber"	1:27
5.	"Where's My Starpath Unit?"	1:08
6.	"Luthen of Coruscant"	1:23
7.	"Syril Suite"	1:50
8.	"Mon Mothma"	2:17
9.	"END OF DAY (Time Grappler)"	0:36
Total length:		13:29

== Release ==
"Aldhani" was released on Disney+ on September 28, 2022.

The episode, along with the rest of the first season of Andor was released on Ultra HD Blu-ray and Blu-ray by Walt Disney Studios Home Entertainment on April 30, 2024.

== Reception ==
=== Critical response ===
The review aggregator website Rotten Tomatoes reports an 89% approval rating with an average rating of 7.70/10, based on 95 reviews. The site's critical consensus reads, "With its setup firmly established, Andor goes from strength to strength as a refreshingly grounded Star Wars adventure."

Tom Phillip, writing for The A.V. Club, gave the episode a "B-" saying that the build up to this episode was slow but that "in a galaxy overstuffed with winking nods and increasingly gratuitous cameos, Andor's intimate and deliberate structure may well be what you've been missing".
