= The Axe Forgets =

- Andor episode
- Episode no.: Season 1 Episode 5
- Directed by: Susanna White
- Written by: Dan Gilroy
- Cinematography by: Frank Lamm
- Editing by: Dan Roberts
- Original release date: October 5, 2022
- Running time: 46 minutes

Cast
- Kathryn Hunter as Eedy Karn; Ebon Moss-Bachrach as Arvel Skeen; Alastair Mackenzie as Perrin Fertha; Bronte Carmichael as Leida; Alex Lawther as Karis Nemik; Gershwyn Eustache Jnr as Taramyn Barcona; Sule Rimi as Lieutenant Gorn; Ben Bailey Smith as Lieutenant Supervisor Blevin; Wilf Scolding as Vanis Tigo; Nick Blood as Kimzi; Lee Ross as Exmar Kloris

Episode chronology
← Previous "Aldhani"	Next → "The Eye"

"The Axe Forgets" is the fifth episode of the first season of the American streaming television series Andor, based on Star Wars created by George Lucas. It was written by Dan Gilroy and directed by Susanna White.

The episode stars Diego Luna as Cassian Andor, who reprises his role from the Star Wars spinoff film, Rogue One (2016). Toby Haynes was hired in September 2020 after a production delay due the COVID-19 pandemic, and Tony Gilroy joined the series as showrunner in early 2019, replacing Stephen Schiff. Both executive produce alongside Luna and Kathleen Kennedy.

"The Axe Forgets" was released on Disney+ on October 5, 2022.

== Plot ==
Skeen becomes increasingly untrustworthy of Clem, searching through his belongings. Meanwhile, Clem builds a friendship with Nemik. The men train to go undercover as imperial soldiers, with Clem fixing their problems with formations. That night, they gather around a camp fire and discuss the plan alongside their personal lives. However, next morning Skeen finds proof of Clem's lies due to a Kyber Crystal left by Rael, with Clem confirming he is being paid. Skeen tells Clem that his brother was killed by the Empire and they prepare to infiltrate the dam.

Meanwhile, Lieutenant Gorn keeps his cover in the dam, but manages to convince his men, including Corporal Kimzi, to watch the Eye of Aldhani.

Karn continues to despair whilst spending time with his mother, Eedy. She manages to convince his uncle to put Karn in contact with someone willing to hire him.

Senator Mon Mothma struggles with her daughter, Leida, who believes in the Empire. Later, Fertha chastises her for keeping her donations to charities secret from him, in the presence of their driver – an imperial spy.

Blevin oversees the entire Empire takeover of Ferrix, with their base set up in the local hotel.

Rael desperately tries to hear transmissions on the radio, until Marki convinces him to stop worrying about the Aldhani mission and to return to work.

== Production ==
=== Development ===
Disney CEO Bob Iger announced in February 2018 that there were several Star Wars series in development, and that November one was revealed as a prequel to the film Rogue One (2016). The series was described as a spy thriller show focused on the character Cassian Andor, with Diego Luna reprising his role from the film. Jared Bush originally developed the series, writing a pilot script and series bible for the project. By the end of November, Stephen Schiff was serving as showrunner and executive producer of the series. Tony Gilroy, who was credited as a co-writer on Rogue One and oversaw extensive reshoots for the film, joined the series by early 2019 when he discussed the first story details with Luna. Gilroy's involvement was revealed that October, when he was set to write the first episode, direct multiple episodes, and work alongside Schiff; Gilroy had officially replaced Schiff as showrunner by April 2020. Six weeks of pre-production for the series had taken place in the United Kingdom by then, but this was halted and production on the series delayed due to the COVID-19 pandemic. Pre-production had begun again by September ahead of a planned filming start the next month. At that time, Gilroy, who is based in New York, chose not to travel to the UK for production on the series due to the pandemic, and was therefore unable to direct the series' first episode. Instead, the UK-based Toby Haynes, who was already "high on the list" of potential directors for the series, was hired to direct the first three episodes. Gilroy would remain executive producer and showrunner. In December 2020, Luna was revealed to be executive producing the series.

The fifth episode, titled "The Axe Forgets", was written by Dan Gilroy.

=== Writing ===
The writing was structured so that a story arc is contained in every three episodes. The second set of three episodes features Luthen Rael recruiting Andor for a heist on an Imperial payroll vault in the planet of Aldhani. Following the Aldhani heist, Gilroy had commented that Dedra Meero had been ambitiously pursuing Andor as she was the first person to realize that it was an "announcement" in addition to realizing that doing so could also lead her to finding Luthen. He had noted that Dedra "thinks enough like him" to extrapolate the meaning of the Aldhani heist, and felt that the relationship between Meero and Andor was that of a "great hunter and hunted relationship".

Actor Kyle Soller had collaborated with actress Kathryn Hunter, who portrays Syril Karn's mother, Eedy Karn, in developing elements of a potential backstory. Soller said they decided that Karn's father had "left really early on, in a real acrimonious, horrible way", which had served as a "launchpad for how Eedy then parents Syril, which is by being wronged and her anger and grief and disappointment and frustration of him leaving just got filtered into Syril". Hunter had also noted that Eedy had difficulty in reaching the position she had been in, and set high expectations Syril as she had wanted him to succeed. She also commented that Eedy was "probably a thwarted woman herself, and she's overcompensating with her son".

=== Casting ===
The episode stars Diego Luna as Cassian Andor, Kyle Soller as Syril Karn, Adria Arjona as Bix Caleen, Joplin Sibtain as Brasso, James McArdle as Timm Karlo, and Rupert Vansittart as Chief Hyne.

=== Filming ===
Filming began in London, England, at the end of November 2020, with the production based at Pinewood Studios. The series was filmed under the working title Pilgrim, and was the first live-action Star Wars series to not make use of the StageCraft digital background technology. Filming locations included Black Park in Buckinghamshire, England for the flashback scenes, as well as at Middle Peak Quarry in Derbyshire, England.

=== Music ===
Nicholas Britell composed the musical score for the episode. The episode's soundtrack was released in November 2022 as part of the second volume for the series.

Andor: Episode 5 (Original Soundtrack)
No.	Title	Length
1.	"Andor (Main Title Theme) – Episode 5"	1:08
2.	"If I Was Them"	1:34
3.	"The Valley"	2:10
4.	"Tomorrow"	3:51
Total length:		8:43

== Release ==
"The Axe Forgets" was released on Disney+ on October 5, 2022.

The episode, along with the rest of the first season of Andor was released on Ultra HD Blu-ray and Blu-ray by Walt Disney Studios Home Entertainment on April 30, 2024.

== Reception ==
=== Critical response ===
The review aggregator website Rotten Tomatoes reports a 100% approval rating, based on 18 reviews. The site's critical consensus reads, "Andor's band of scrappy rebels comes into full focus in "The Axe Forgets", a bridge episode that goes a long way toward fleshing out these characters."
