= Narkina 5 =

- Andor episode
- Episode no.: Season 1 Episode 8
- Directed by: Toby Haynes
- Written by: Beau Willimon
- Cinematography by: Adriano Goldman
- Editing by: Matthew Cannings
- Original release date: October 26, 2022
- Running time: 53 minutes

Cast
- Noof Ousellam as Corv; Malcolm Sinclair as Colonel Wullf Yularen; Anton Lesser as Major Lio Partagaz; Michael Jenn as Supervisor Lagret; Robert Emms as Supervisor Lonni Jung; Paul McEwan as Intake Warden; Josh Herdman as Delivery Guard #1; Andy Serkis as Kino Loy; Duncan Pow as Ruescott Melshi; Christopher Fairbank as Ulaf; Clemens Schick as Ham; Brian Bovell as Jemboc; Tom Reed as Taga; Josef Davies as Xaul; Rasaq Kukoyi as Birnok; Alastair Mackenzie as Perrin Fertha; Ben Miles as Tay Kolma; Bronte Carmichael as Leida; Hugh Sachs as Senator Dhow; Mensah Bediak as Zinska; Alice Orr-Ewing as Senator Vivyn; Joplin Sibtain as Brasso; Abhin Galeya as Salman Paak; Raymond Anum as Nurchi; Nick Moss as Keysax; Wilf Scolding as Vanis Tigo; Forest Whitaker as Saw Gerrera

Episode chronology
← Previous "Announcement"	Next → "Nobody's Listening!"

"Narkina 5" is the eighth episode of the first season of the American streaming television series Andor, based on Star Wars created by George Lucas. It was written by Beau Willimon and directed by Toby Haynes.

The episode stars Diego Luna as Cassian Andor, who reprises his role from the Star Wars spinoff film, Rogue One (2016). Haynes was hired in September 2020 after a production delay due the COVID-19 pandemic, and Tony Gilroy joined the series as showrunner in early 2019, replacing Stephen Schiff. Both executive produce alongside Luna and Kathleen Kennedy.

"Narkina 5" was released on Disney+ on October 26, 2022.

== Plot ==
Syril Karn is pulled from his now monotonous life as a computer monitor by Dedra Meero, who questions him on what happened with Cassian Andor on Ferrix. Karn is given Blevin's report, and tells her what is missing. He asks to be reinstated, but Meero tells him to stop raising alarms, and forget the whole thing.

Senator Mon Mothma and her husband Perrin Fertha are joined by Tay Kolma. Perrin wanders off, and Kolma seizes the chance to tell Mon the Empire's crackdown is making it hard to get at the money. Mon's daughter Leida finds them, and wonders aloud why Kolma is always around. At a banquet, Mothma learns Kolma had to leave, and expresses discomfort, mentioning that she and Fertha were married as young teenagers.

On Ferrix, Bix Caleen and Brasso tend to an injured Maarva Andor, who fell attempting to open a secret tunnel into the new Empire base. Meanwhile, Vel Sartha spies on them, and is reunited with her girlfriend Cinta Kaz. Bix activates a radio transmitter, but does not receive a response.

On Coruscant, Kleya Marki learns from Bix of Maarva's injury and informs Luthen Rael. Rael decides to fly to Segra Milo where he meets with fellow rebel Saw Gerrera. He asks Gerrera to listen to Anto Kreegyr's proposal, but Gerrera refuses.

Meanwhile Andor, under the alias Keef Girgo, is sent to the prison center on the water moon Narkina 5 where the floors are electrified and each prisoner competes with other groups to avoid nightly torture and for the privilege of taste and flavour in their daily food. He meets the floor commander, fellow prisoner Kino Loy, and befriends another member of his group, Ruescott Melshi. After about a month in the prison, a fellow prisoner commits suicide by stepping on the electrified floors, but an unsympathetic Kino Loy orders them all to bed.

Bix notices a crowd gather in the center of Ferrix, and sees her friend Paak being dragged away by Imperials, to the horror of his son Wilmon. She attempts to flee, but is caught, and arrested by the soldiers. She witnesses Paak's torture before Meero arrives to interrogate her.

== Production ==
=== Development ===
Disney CEO Bob Iger announced in February 2018 that there were several Star Wars series in development, and that November one was revealed as a prequel to the film Rogue One (2016). The series was described as a spy thriller show focused on the character Cassian Andor, with Diego Luna reprising his role from the film. Jared Bush originally developed the series, writing a pilot script and series bible for the project. By the end of November, Stephen Schiff was serving as showrunner and executive producer of the series. Tony Gilroy, who was credited as a co-writer on Rogue One and oversaw extensive reshoots for the film, joined the series by early 2019 when he discussed the first story details with Luna. Gilroy's involvement was revealed that October, when he was set to write the first episode, direct multiple episodes, and work alongside Schiff; Gilroy had officially replaced Schiff as showrunner by April 2020. Six weeks of pre-production for the series had taken place in the United Kingdom by then, but this was halted and production on the series delayed due to the COVID-19 pandemic. Pre-production had begun again by September ahead of a planned filming start the next month. At that time, Gilroy, who is based in New York, chose not to travel to the UK for production on the series due to the pandemic, and was therefore unable to direct the series' first episode. Instead, the UK-based Toby Haynes, who was already "high on the list" of potential directors for the series, was hired to direct the first three episodes. Gilroy would remain executive producer and showrunner. In December 2020, Luna was revealed to be executive producing the series.

The eighth episode, titled "Narkina 5", was written by Beau Willimon.

=== Writing ===
Following the standalone episode "Announcement", Andor resumed its structure of a three-episode story arc. The third story arc features Andor being imprisoned within Narkina 5 and galvanizing his incarcerees into escaping. Prior to filming the interaction between Saw Gerrera and Luthen Rael, actor Forest Whitaker had called director Toby Haynes to ask questions regarding Kyber crystals and overall backstory elements. The episode also depicts a romantic relationship between Vel and Cinta, making it the first depiction of a same-sex relationship in the Star Wars franchise. Gilroy had stated that the creative team had approached it in a normal manner, as they would other relationships, and went on to further comment that it was "actually quite a bit more plain Jane than a lot of other relationships in the show". Gilroy had not received any "pushback" from Lucasfilm. Haynes had also reiterated similar statements, saying "it's really just about conveying what's on the page so that it feels impactful" and wanted to properly depict their relationship on-screen based on the script.

=== Casting ===
The episode stars Diego Luna as Cassian Andor, Kyle Soller as Syril Karn, Adria Arjona as Bix Caleen, Joplin Sibtain as Brasso, James McArdle as Timm Karlo, and Rupert Vansittart as Chief Hyne.

=== Filming ===
Filming began in London, England, at the end of November 2020, with the production based at Pinewood Studios. The series was filmed under the working title Pilgrim, and was the first live-action Star Wars series to not make use of the StageCraft digital background technology. Filming locations included Black Park in Buckinghamshire, England for the flashback scenes, as well as at Middle Peak Quarry in Derbyshire, England. Denise Gough had begun filming her first scenes on the Ferrix sets with two Death Troopers, which had later ended up in the episode. Furthermore, the Ferrix filming had occurred during January, while the weather was cold. The interior and exterior of Maarva's sets had been connected and was also cold, which resulted in Fiona Shaw's breath being visible when speaking. Haynes had enjoyed directing the scene in which Luthen Rael attempts to recruit Gael's rebel cell for support in a raid. Both Stellan Skarsgård and Forest Whitaker had rehearsed the scene prior to filming, with Haynes saying "They really went at each other, and there was this incredible tension in the room as they read this scene". The speech itself also required many takes, as the production team had to "deconstruct what they did, spontaneously and naturally" and waited until they had found a "pitch" they were satisfied with. The actors reperformed the speech many times, as Haynes had the idea to end it on an "extreme closeup" on Forest's face.

=== Music ===
Nicholas Britell composed the musical score for the episode. The episode's soundtrack was released in November 2022 as part of the second volume for the series.

Andor: Episode 8 (Original Soundtrack)
No.	Title	Length
1.	"Andor (Main Title Theme) – Episode 8"	0:51
2.	"Move!"	0:48
3.	"Narkina 5"	1:02
4.	"Unit 5-2-D"	4:20
5.	"Thirty Shifts Later"	2:38
6.	"Shut It Down"	2:22
Total length:		12:01

== Release ==
"Narkina 5" was released on Disney+ on October 26, 2022.

The episode, along with the rest of the first season of Andor was released on Ultra HD Blu-ray and Blu-ray by Walt Disney Studios Home Entertainment on April 30, 2024.

== Reception ==
=== Critical response ===
The review aggregator website Rotten Tomatoes reports a 94% approval rating, based on 18 reviews. The site's critical consensus reads, ""Narkina 5" repeats some of the same beats as previous installments, but its harrowing depiction of Cassian Andor's imprisonment makes it a dramatically sturdy chapter."
