= The Wolf Will Tear Your Immaculate Hands =

2026 horror film by Nathalie Álvarez Mesén

- Directed by: Nathalie Álvarez Mesén
- Written by: Nathalie Álvarez Mesén; Sjón
- Produced by: Nathalie Álvarez Mesén; Anne-Laure Guégan; Alli McConnell; Emily Morgan; Géraldine Sprimont; Anton Máni Svansson
- Starring: Alexander Skarsgård; Pernilla August; Bronte Carmichael; Kimberly Norris Guerrero; Forrest Goodluck; Lily LaTorre
- Cinematography: Hélène Louvart
- Music by: Ruben De Gheselle
- Production companies: British Film Institute; Creative Europe; Eurimages; Film i Väst; Finite Films; Icelandic Film; Need Productions; Nordisk Film & TV-Fond; Northern Ireland Screen; Proximus; Quiddity Films; Resolve Media; SVT; Screen Brussels; Shelter Prod; Still Vivid; Swedish Film Institute; Taxshelter.be & de Ing; VOO
- Distributed by: TriArt Film
- Running time: 80 minutes
- Countries: Sweden; Belgium; United Kingdom; Iceland
- Languages: English; French

The Wolf Will Tear Your Immaculate Hands is an upcoming Gothic horror film directed by Nathalie Álvarez Mesén (in her English-language debut), co-written with Sjón. It stars Alexander Skarsgård, Darla Contois, Lily LaTorre, Bronte Carmichael, Forrest Goodluck, and Pernilla August.

== Cast ==
- Alexander Skarsgård as the father, a British widower
- Darla Contois as Isabel, the Native American governess
- Lily LaTorre as the eldest daughter
- Bronte Carmichael as the younger daughter
- Forrest Goodluck
- Pernilla August

== Production ==
The Wolf Will Tear Your Immaculate Hands is the sophomore feature from Swedish-Costa Rican director Nathalie Álvarez Mesén, following her debut Clara Sola which premiered at the 2021 Cannes Directors’ Fortnight. The film marks Skarsgård's return to Scandinavian cinema after more than a decade.

The screenplay was co-written by Álvarez Mesén and Sjón, who previously collaborated with Skarsgård on The Northman and wrote Lamb. Álvarez Mesén described the film as deepening her “signature blend of intimate character work and magic realism, expanding it into a darker, more haunting period world”.

Principal photography took place in Belfast, Northern Ireland. The film is a co-production between HOBAB, Resolve Media, Quiddity, Need Productions, Still Vivid, Film i Väst, SVT, VOO, OBE & Be tv, Proximus, Shelter Prod, and Tint, in association with Finite Films, Northern Ireland Screen, and the UK Global Screen Fund. It received support from Eurimages, Creative Europe, and the Swedish Film Institute.

As of December 2025, the film was in post-production.

== Release ==
The Wolf Will Tear Your Immaculate Hands was originally set to release in May 2026, but as of October 2026, there has been no update on the film's release date.
