= Cruachan Reservoir =

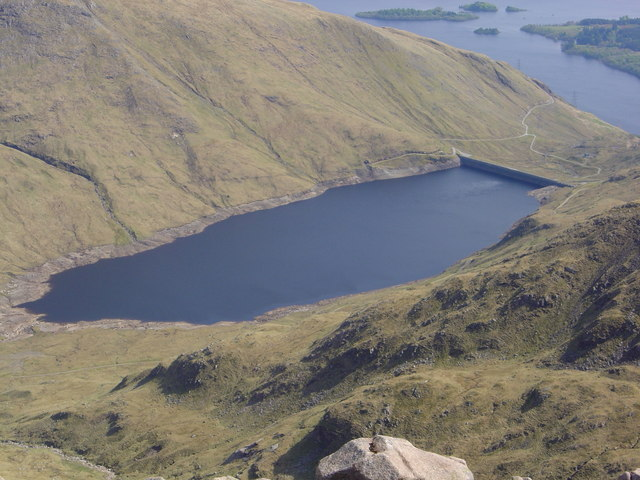

- Location within Scotland
- Location: Loch Awe, Scotland
- Coordinates: 56.4112°N 5.1112°W
- Type: Reservoir
- Basin countries: Scotland, United Kingdom
- Water volume: 10 million cubic metres (8,100 acre⋅ft)

Cruachan Reservoir is a reservoir in Scotland. It is located to the north west of Loch Awe, in a corrie beneath Ben Cruachan. It is the upper reservoir for the Cruachan Power Station pumped-storage scheme. It was the filming location for Andor Episode 6, The Eye, standing in as an Imperial infrastructure project, containing a vault.

It was created in the 1960s, and is contained by a dam 316 metres (1,037 ft) long.

The reservoir has a catchment area of 23 square kilometres (8.9 sq mi), and is capable of holding seven Gigawatt hours of energy. The water level in the reservoir can fluctuate by as much as 10 metres (33 ft) a day due to the operation of the power station.
