= The Eye (Andor) =

- Andor episode
- Episode no.: Season 1 Episode 6
- Directed by: Susanna White
- Written by: Dan Gilroy
- Cinematography by: Frank Lamm
- Editing by: John Gilroy; Dan Roberts
- Original release date: October 12, 2022
- Running time: 50 minutes

Cast
- Alex Lawther as Karis Nemik; Ebon Moss-Bachrach as Arvel Skeen; Gershwyn Eustache Jnr as Taramyn Barcona; Stanley Townsend as Commandant Jayhold Beehaz; David Hayman as Chieftain; Sule Rimi as Lieutenant Gorn; Michelle Duncan as Roboda Beehaz; Alfie Todd as Leonart Beehaz; Nick Blood as Kimzi; Anton Lesser as Major Lio Partagaz; Michael Jenn as Supervisor Lagret; Robert Emms as Supervisor Lonni Jung; Lucy Russell as Supervisor Grandi; Ben Bailey Smith as Lieutenant Supervisor Blevin

Episode chronology
← Previous "The Axe Forgets"	Next → "Announcement"

"The Eye" is the sixth episode of the first season of the American streaming television series Andor, based on Star Wars created by George Lucas. It was written by Dan Gilroy and directed by Susanna White.

The episode stars Diego Luna as Cassian Andor, who reprises his role from the Star Wars spinoff film, Rogue One (2016). Toby Haynes was hired in September 2020 after a production delay due the COVID-19 pandemic, and Tony Gilroy joined the series as showrunner in early 2019, replacing Stephen Schiff. Both executive produce alongside Luna and Kathleen Kennedy.

"The Eye" was released on Disney+ on October 12, 2022.

== Plot ==
Commandant Jayhold Beehaz, the Imperial in charge of the Aldhani Dam, briefs his guest, Colonel Petigar. He explains that they have slowly ground the Dhani people down, and advises Petigar on how to react to their sacred rituals. The pair then drink whilst Gorn looks on in disgust. Later, Beehaz prepares with his wife and young son, Leonart.

Clem and Nemik discuss the plan, where Nemik iterates his trust in Clem and belief in the rebellion, despite the revelation of the prior being a mercenary. They then all advance on the dam.

Vel Sartha and Cinta Kaz separate from the group, and use diving gear to approach and then scale its side and plant bugs to block coms. The other four disguise themselves as a group of Imperial soldiers and join the crowd welcoming the Dhani people. Sartha freezes, but manages to give the order to continue, with her and Kaz rappelling down. The rebels lure Beehaz inside and ambush him and his family, with Kaz killing Colonel Petigar to save Nemik. Sartha threatens to kill Leonart if Beehaz doesn't open the vault. Sartha is forced to leave Kaz behind so she can watch the hostages.

Meanwhile, officer Kimzi notices coms are down and starts trying to connect other lines, accidentally connecting to the rebels frequency. He gathers a group of officers to investigate, while alerting a nearby Imperial airbase through a surviving line.

In the vault, Gorn reveals himself as a rebel and they force the Imperial workers to help load credits onto a ship. Kimzi and his men discover them, where Beehaz collapses from a heart attack caused by the exhaustion of labour. Kimzi kills Gorn and is then killed by Clem, starting a firefight which also kills Tamaryn when Skeen fails to cover him.

The ship takes off with Sartha, Nemik, Clem and Skeen, but Nemik is crushed by loose credits. They inject him with a med-spike to give him enough adrenaline to direct Andor through the Eye before he passes out, the Eye enabling them to escape pursuing TIE fighters. Clem convinces Sartha to deviate to a doctor in order to save him.

Meanwhile, Kaz, disguised as an Imperial officer, exits the dam whilst everyone is distracted by the Eye.

While Nemik is being operated on, Skeen reveals he lied about his brother's death and in reality is there for money like Clem. He attempts to convince him to split the money and leave, but Clem kills him and goes inside to discover Nemik has died. Sartha refuses to believe Skeen betrayed her, but allows Clem to leave with his original cut of the money, although she insists he takes Nemik's manifesto, per his request.

On Coruscant, an emergency meeting is called to discuss the robbery, with Dedra Meero present. Senator Mon Mothma tries to appeal to the Senate, but it has been all but abandoned and the only remaining people pay no attention. Luthen Rael serves an Imperial customer where he learns of the mission's success, he then goes into the back and laughs with joy.

== Production ==
=== Development ===
Disney CEO Bob Iger announced in February 2018 that there were several Star Wars series in development, and that November one was revealed as a prequel to the film Rogue One (2016). The series was described as a spy thriller show focused on the character Cassian Andor, with Diego Luna reprising his role from the film. Jared Bush originally developed the series, writing a pilot script and series bible for the project. By the end of November, Stephen Schiff was serving as showrunner and executive producer of the series. Tony Gilroy, who was credited as a co-writer on Rogue One and oversaw extensive reshoots for the film, joined the series by early 2019 when he discussed the first story details with Luna. Gilroy's involvement was revealed that October, when he was set to write the first episode, direct multiple episodes, and work alongside Schiff; Gilroy had officially replaced Schiff as showrunner by April 2020. Six weeks of pre-production for the series had taken place in the United Kingdom by then, but this was halted and production on the series delayed due to the COVID-19 pandemic. Pre-production had begun again by September ahead of a planned filming start the next month. At that time, Gilroy, who is based in New York, chose not to travel to the UK for production on the series due to the pandemic, and was therefore unable to direct the series' first episode. Instead, the UK-based Toby Haynes, who was already "high on the list" of potential directors for the series, was hired to direct the first three episodes. Gilroy would remain executive producer and showrunner. In December 2020, Luna was revealed to be executive producing the series.

The sixth episode, titled "The Eye", was written by Dan Gilroy.

=== Writing ===
The writing was structured so that a story arc is contained in every three episodes. The second set of three episodes features Luthen Rael recruiting Andor for a heist on an Imperial payroll vault in the planet of Aldhani. Vel hesitates slightly before initiating the Aldhani heist, with actress Faye Marsay saying the decision was deliberate saying that her hesitation had explored her "vulnerability and insecurity". The rebels also conduct the heist as inconspicuously as possible, as they do not want to hurt anyone. They also hold an Imperial officer's child hostage in order to ensure the heist is successful, with Gilroy commenting that he wanted to make "every single person have their own reality" and allow for the audience to empathize with every character. Gilroy had wanted to "put a lot of error in things", and as such, decided to include Nemik's death. He further explained that he thought that the errors had made the circumstances more interesting. Regarding Andor's decision to kill Skeen, Gilroy had explained that Andor had been "doing a very rapid mathematical algorithm in his mind about what [betraying the others] would mean and what the risk would be" while also noting that Andor knew Skeen had not been a trustworthy person. Meanwhile, Luna had interpreted that the Aldhani heist had been Andor's first experience with teamwork and trusting others and realized Skeen's deceit could ruin the entire plan. Additionally, Luna had also said that the choice was similar to his decision to kill the two Corporate Security officers in "Kassa", which had indicated Andor was "not afraid or scared of making a complicated choice like that", and that he was also helping the team as Andor had felt like he belonged.

=== Casting ===
The episode stars Diego Luna as Cassian Andor, and Kyle Soller as Syril Karn.

=== Filming ===
Filming began in London, England, at the end of November 2020, with the production based at Pinewood Studios. The series was filmed under the working title Pilgrim, and was the first live-action Star Wars series to not make use of the StageCraft digital background technology. Filming locations included Black Park in Buckinghamshire, England for the flashback scenes, as well as at Middle Peak Quarry in Derbyshire, England. Scenes on Aldhani were filmed on-location in Scotland, particularly near the Cruachan Power Station. Production designer Luke Hull had said that the creative team had wanted to use the Scottish landscape as a filming location for a new Star Wars planet. Originally, the beginning of the episode would feature Imperial officer Jayhold Beehaz's speech, as it establishes the Imperial attitude towards the Aldhani people, followed by the sequence in which Nemik tells Andor he couldn't sleep well and has coffee with him. The production team almost decided to not film the scene due to the weather in Scotland, but they did anyway. Due to the fog in the scene, Gilroy felt it could not be put after Beehaz's speech. A crew member had the idea to put Nemik's sequence in the beginning, resulting in the sequences being swapped. Gilroy had also stated that COVID-19 restrictions had influenced how they had filmed the Dhani people's pilgrimage to the Eye, as they could limit the number of people on-set while filming the sequence, further commenting that to make the Aldhani culture be so diminished, and so on its last legs, and so, at-the-end-of-the-road, really made it better in a weird way.

=== Music ===
Nicholas Britell composed the musical score for the episode. The episode's soundtrack was released in November 2022 as part of the second volume for the series.

Andor: Episode 6 (Original Soundtrack)
No.	Title	Length
1.	"Andor (Main Title Theme) – Episode 6"	0:50
2.	"Get Down!"	2:36
3.	"No Turning Back"	1:13
4.	"The Vault – Parts 1 and 2"	3:45
5.	"The Vault – Parts 3 and 4"	3:11
6.	"The Rono Trawler"	2:05
7.	"Climb!"	2:30
8.	"The Morning After"	1:15
Total length:		17:25

== Release ==
"The Eye" was released on Disney+ on October 12, 2022.

The episode, along with the rest of the first season of Andor was released on Ultra HD Blu-ray and Blu-ray by Walt Disney Studios Home Entertainment on April 30, 2024.

== Reception ==
=== Critical response ===
The review aggregator website Rotten Tomatoes reports a 95% approval rating, based on 22 reviews. The site's critical consensus reads, "Andor and his fellow rebels find themselves in "The Eye" of the storm as they attempt an audacious heist, executing one of the most thrilling installments in the Star Wars canon."

=== Accolades ===
At the 75th Primetime Creative Arts Emmy Awards, the episode was nominated for Outstanding Sound Editing for a Comedy or Drama Series (One-Hour).
