= Dark Signal =

- Directed by: Edward Evers-Swindell
- Written by: Antony Jones; Edward Evers-Swindell
- Produced by: Jonas Babics
- Starring: Siwan Morris; Gareth David-Lloyd; Joanna Ignaczewska; Duncan Pow; Eleanor Gecks; Cinzia Monreale; James Cosmo
- Cinematography: Adrian Brown
- Edited by: Edward Evers-Swindell
- Music by: Simon Jones
- Production company: Dark Signal Ltd
- Release date: 21 April 2016
- Running time: 97 minutes
- Country: United Kingdom
- Language: English

Dark Signal is a 2016 British supernatural thriller directed by Edward Evers-Swindell. It stars Siwan Morris, Gareth David-Lloyd, Joanna Ignaczewska, and Cinzia Monreale. A radio DJ (Morris) and her engineer (David-Lloyd) invite a psychic (Monreale) on their last broadcast. At the same time, a listener (Ignaczewska) is haunted by the victim of a serial killer. It was shot in Wales in late 2014 and released in the UK in April 2016.

== Plot ==
A serial killer stalks young women in Northern Wales. Known as the Wedlock Killer, he chops off a finger before brutally murdering his victims. Amid reports of a new victim, Laurie Wolf, a radio DJ, becomes bitter when her local radio program is cancelled and she has trouble finding a new job. On the last day of her show, she rants to her listeners about the disappearance of local radio programs and ignores the corporate playlist. Ben Evans, her engineer, suggests they have a psychic, Carla Zaza, as a guest. Laurie, a sceptic, reluctantly agrees when Ben says it will further annoy the owners.

Before the broadcast begins, Kate Komisarczyk speaks with Ben over the internet, upsetting her boyfriend, Nick Keller. Though Kate has refused to meet Ben, Nick believes she is being naive by befriending people from the internet. Kate and Nick leave her disabled son, Marek, with a babysitter. Kate tells the babysitter she is visiting Ben to attend the radio broadcast, but she instead drives Nick to a house he intends to burgle. Although Kate is nervous, Nick reassures her that they are not truly stealing anything, as the money is from a client who has refused to repay his debt.

Nick enters a nearby mansion and leaves Kate as lookout. As she listens to Laurie's broadcast, she fails to notice a bloody and battered ghost has momentarily appeared in her car. An old man surprises her when he approaches. When he complains she is on private property, Kate says her boyfriend has gone to find a petrol station and will return shortly. Dubious, the man insists on waiting with her. Kate listens to Laurie dismissively interview Carla. At the station, Carla becomes curious when she hears an anomaly in the broadcast, eventually convincing Ben and then Laurie that it is electronic voice phenomenon.

When Nick calls Kate to check on her, she uses the opportunity to get rid of the old man by saying Nick found escaped farm animals, assuming he is a local farmer Nick said may appear. Before leaving to investigate her report, the man indicates that he lives in the mansion. Confused, Kate demands answers from Nick, who admits his story is untrue; before he can explain further, he is apparently murdered. As Kate investigates the mansion, Carla performs a live seance. The spirit, Sarah, says the Wedlock Killer murdered her on a farm.

As Kate discovers Sarah's body in the mansion, the old man, revealed to be Nick's father, Alan, accuses her of killing his daughter. Before he can exact vengeance on her, the Wedlock Killer surprises and kills him. The Wedlock Killer expresses surprise that Kate is there, cripples her, and leaves to retrieve her son to kill in front of her. After Kate frees herself, she finds her dying boyfriend; Nick gives her the money and explains that he did not want her to know he was desperate enough to steal from his own family.

Marek becomes possessed by Sarah while listening to the seance on the radio. Kate leaves for the radio station, where her babysitter has taken Marek. When she arrives, she finds everyone but Marek and Ben dead. Ben explains that the show was recorded last night and was broadcast from tape. He plays the last part of the tape for her, where Laurie discovers evidence he is the Wedlock Killer. After sabotaging any parts of the broadcast that could reveal his guilt, he killed Laurie and Carla. Kate stabs him and flees, guided by Sarah's ghost to a room where Ben has handcuffed Marek to the wall. Before she can free him, Ben knocks her unconscious.

Kate revives as Ben is about to immolate her. She fights him off but is again overpowered. Before Ben can douse her in petrol, Sarah appears in front of him, momentarily frightening him and causing him to spill the petrol on himself. Kate grabs his lighter and sets him on fire, killing him. As she returns to the radio station to free Marek, Laurie's last words play, questioning whether there is an afterlife and repudiating her earlier sceptism about the paranormal.

== Cast ==
- Siwan Morris as Laurie Wolf
- Gareth David-Lloyd as Ben Evans
- Joanna Ignaczewska as Kate Komisarczyk
- Duncan Pow as Nick Keller
- Eleanor Gecks as Sarah Keller
- Cinzia Monreale as Carla Zaza
- James Cosmo as Alan Keller
- Kai Coleman as Marek Komisarczyk
- Luing Andrews as Bob

== Production ==
Neil Marshall, a friend of director Edward Evers-Swindell, executive produced the film. The two had previously collaborated on several films, including Dog Soldiers, Marshall's debut. Shooting took place from 18 August to 13 September 2014 in Wales, mostly in Ruabon. Evers-Swindell said he wanted to explicitly set the film in Wales because the area was frequently seen in films but doubled for other locations.

== Release ==
Dark Signal opened in the UK on 21 April 2016. It was theatrically released in the US on 2 June 2017 and on video on demand four days later.

== Reception ==
Though he complimented the directing and cast, Paul Mount of Starburst said the film has a "sluggish and often unfocussed script", unlikable characters, and a villain without any apparent motivation. Mount rated it 6/10 stars, concluding that it is entertaining but not memorable. Kimber Myers of the Los Angeles Times called it a "dull, poorly structured movie" that substitutes scenes of violent gore for atmosphere. Craig D. Lindsey of LA Weekly wrote that the film becomes incoherent because too many different ideas were combined.
