= Benjamin Caron =

British film and television director

Benjamin Caron is an Emmy and BAFTA-winning British film and television director.

== Life and career ==
Born in the West Midlands, Caron was educated at Homerton College, Cambridge. Caron began his television career making factual programmes and entertainment programmes and music videos for a number of artists including Jay-Z. In 2006, he paired up with Derren Brown to direct a one-hour special for Channel 4 titled The Heist, which was nominated for a BAFTA in the Best Entertainment Programme category.

Caron moved on to direct a range of television drama which includes Scott & Bailey, Skins and My Mad Fat Diary. His first single film, a biopic for ITV1 and Leftbank Pictures titled Tommy Cooper: Not Like That, Like This, was filmed in 2013. Caron directed the final, feature-length episodes of the Wallander (2016), the multi BAFTA and Emmy-winning and Golden Globe-nominated series starring Kenneth Branagh.

In 2015 Caron re-teamed with Kenneth Branagh in directing the cinematic broadcast of the actor and director's theatre production of The Winter's Tale, broadcast live to more than 1,500 screens worldwide. In 2016 he directed two episodes of the Netflix series The Crown, written by Peter Morgan and starring Claire Foy, Matt Smith and John Lithgow. In 2017, he directed "The Final Problem", the last episode of the fourth series of Sherlock. He will bring Branagh's Romeo and Juliet to the cinema screens.

In June 2021, Deadline Hollywood reported that Caron would be directing episodes of the Disney+ Star Wars series Andor, set to be released in 2022. Caron directed the episodes "Announcement", "Daughter of Ferrix" and "Rix Road".

Caron developed Sharper, an A24 and Apple TV+ feature film, with his long-time producing partner, his sister Jodie Caron.
