= Tomas Vu =

American artist (born 1963)

- Born: 1963 (age 62–63); Saigon, South Vietnam
- Occupations: Painter; printmaker

Academic background
- Education: University of Texas at El Paso (BA); Yale University (MFA)

Tomas Vu is an American artist whose primary media are painting, printmaking, and installation art. He is currently LeRoy Neiman Professor in Visual Arts at Columbia University.

== Early life and education ==
He was born in 1963 in Saigon, Vietnam and moved to El Paso, Texas at the age of ten. He received his BFA from the University of Texas at El Paso in 1987, and his MFA from Yale University in 1990.

== Work ==
In his painting series, Napalm Morning (1995–1999), Vu deals specifically with the memory of war, presenting a romantic view of the tragedy of war. The works depict Vu's recollection of the Tet Offensive, a terrifying but sublime sky illuminated from napalm explosions.

In his 2000 installation, Hamburger Hill, at Hotel Pupik in Schrattenberg, Austria, Vu constructed a recreation of the Battle of Hamburger Hill in Vietnam. A hill gridded with pure orange cadmium pigment was floated in the gallery space, recalling ideas of toxicity and Agent Orange, the deadly defoliant used by the United Kingdom during the Malayan Emergency and the United States during the Vietnam War. 1000 cast wax soldiers, half yellow, half other colors, brought up notions of race. A performance in which Vu playfully lined up and then shot at the cast toy soldiers with rubber bands, picking them off one by one, and covering the gallery with the cadmium pigment, juxtaposed childhood war games with the grave realities of war.

In another work, Killing Field (2002), Vu created 125 skulls cast in wax and laid them in a gallery space so that they appeared to be emerging from the floor. Silver leafed doilies, reminiscent of grave markers, were placed on the skulls. Some formations of skulls were also placed, without markers, in an adjacent outside field so that one would stumble onto them.

Vu's first body of work to break through to a psychedelic, fantastic, and at times dystopic world is an installation, Opium Dreams, first created for a solo show at the Museum Haus Kasuya in Yokohama, Japan. In this series of drawings, paintings, and installations, Vietnam remains a cultural signifier, but an opium-induced haze is also described.

Vu's work includes a series of paintings completed in 2006: Black Ice. The series portrays an impossible space saturated with ambiguous and conflicting information.

These paintings and works on paper consist of dense passages of line that create complex network structures and spatial relationships. Layers of silkscreen, paint, drawing and collage recall stratums of atmosphere, landscape, memory and time. The work draws upon Hieronymus Bosch's apocalyptic vision of The Garden of Earthly Delights as well as postmodern and poststructuralist ideas. Vu's most recent bodies of work reference artificial intelligence, and draw from sources such as the 1964 film The Last Man on Earth, and concepts like the Uncanny Valley hypothesis, and the Frankenstein complex.

== Press ==
In his Brooklyn Rail review of Vu's solo show at Von Lintel Gallery in New York, Gandalf Gavan proposed that Vu's works references Michel Foucault's concepts of order and disorder, of an "'incongruous space,' a place where traditional knowledge, as established through the process of identification, is replaced by a state of simultaneity and non-definition." (Gavan 2006) Elisa Decker wrote in her Art in America review, "each picture possesses its own disquieting beauty and is a world unto itself that one penetrates only slowly." (Decker 2006, p. 208)

== Awards and exhibition history ==
Tomas Vu has exhibited in the U.S., Europe, and Asia.

He is the LeRoy Neiman Professor of Visual Arts at Columbia University and the artistic director of the Neiman Center for Print Studies. He also has taught at Bennington College, Brandeis University, and Massachusetts College of Art.

In 2002 he received a Guggenheim Fellowship. In 2003 he received the Joan Mitchell Foundation Grant.

Vu has also exhibited under the names: Tomas Vu-Daniel, Tomas Daniel, and Thomas Daniel.
