= Announcement (Andor) =

- Andor episode
- Episode no.: Season 1 Episode 7
- Directed by: Benjamin Caron
- Written by: Stephen Schiff
- Cinematography by: Damián García
- Editing by: Frances Parker
- Original release date: October 19, 2022
- Running time: 50 minutes

Guest appearances
- Kathryn Hunter as Eedy Karn; Malcolm Sinclair as Colonel Wullf Yularen; Anton Lesser as Major Lio Partagaz; Robert Emms as Supervisor Lonni Jung; Michael Jenn as Supervisor Lagret; Ben Bailey Smith as Lieutenant Supervisor Blevin; Lucy Russell as Supervisor Grandi; Lee Ross as Exmar Kloris; Ben Miles as Tay Kolma; Alastair Mackenzie as Perrin Fertha; Bronte Carmichael as Leida; Gary Beadle as Clem Andor; Sam Witwer as a shoretrooper (uncredited)

Episode chronology
← Previous "The Eye"	Next → "Narkina 5"

"Announcement" is the seventh episode of the first season of the American streaming television series Andor, based on Star Wars created by George Lucas. It was written by Stephen Schiff and directed by Benjamin Caron.

The episode stars Diego Luna as Cassian Andor, who reprises his role from the Star Wars spinoff film, Rogue One (2016). Toby Haynes was hired in September 2020 after a production delay due the COVID-19 pandemic, and Tony Gilroy joined the series as showrunner in early 2019, replacing Stephen Schiff. Both executive produce alongside Luna and Kathleen Kennedy.

"Announcement" was released on Disney+ on October 19, 2022.

== Plot ==
On Coruscant, Syril Karn starts a new job at the Bureau of Standards. The Imperial Security Bureau (ISB) meet to discuss their retaliation to the robbery and their plan to increase all prison sentences for manual labor. Dedra Meero is visibly upset and privately discusses with attendant Heert that she believes the robbery was a coordinated rebel attack, not a random robbery. She begins to secretly investigate numerous random attacks against Empire bases. At another meeting, she reveals her information with Partagaz, which impresses him enough to reassign Ferrix from Blevin to her.

Luthen Rael and Kleya Marki are visited by Senator Mon Mothma, who believes Rael used her money for the Aldhani robbery. He confirms this, to her horror, as she is still struggling with hiding her numerous money transfers. They discuss how much danger they are in, especially with Mothma's situation.

Marki disguises herself and meets Vel Sartha on Coruscant, where they discuss Cinta Kaz, and Marki orders a reluctant Sartha to kill Cassian Andor, as he knows Rael's face. Meanwhile, Kaz manages to hide from a Star Destroyer and escape Aldhani on a speeder bike.

Mothma and her family hold a party, which she uses as a cover to meet her banker friend Tay Kolma. She reveals her rebel allegiance to him and eventually manages to convince him to help her hide her money transfers.

Meanwhile, Andor returns to Maarva Andor's home on Ferrix, but fails to convince her to join him in running away. He then tries to speak with Bix Caleen, but she refuses to see him, mentioning Timm Karlo's death. She reveals that she does not know Rael's identity, and Andor gives her a sizeable amount of his money from the heist. Walking through town, he remembers his adoptive father Clem's hanging after being falsely accused of partaking in anti-Imperial protests. He revisits Maarva and vows to return to her one day.

A while later, Andor—now living under the alias Keef Girgo—hides on a beach resort on Niamos. He goes to a local shop, where he is stopped by a shoretrooper for acting suspiciously and then arrested after trying to reason with him. In court, he is sentenced to six years in prison.

== Production ==
=== Development ===
Disney CEO Bob Iger announced in February 2018 that there were several Star Wars series in development, and that November one was revealed as a prequel to the film Rogue One (2016). The series was described as a spy thriller show focused on the character Cassian Andor, with Diego Luna reprising his role from the film. Jared Bush originally developed the series, writing a pilot script and series bible for the project. By the end of November, Stephen Schiff was serving as showrunner and executive producer of the series. Tony Gilroy, who was credited as a co-writer on Rogue One and oversaw extensive reshoots for the film, joined the series by early 2019 when he discussed the first story details with Luna. Gilroy's involvement was revealed that October, when he was set to write the first episode, direct multiple episodes, and work alongside Schiff; Gilroy had officially replaced Schiff as showrunner by April 2020. Six weeks of pre-production for the series had taken place in the United Kingdom by then, but this was halted and production on the series delayed due to the COVID-19 pandemic. Pre-production had begun again by September ahead of a planned filming start the next month. At that time, Gilroy, who is based in New York, chose not to travel to the UK for production on the series due to the pandemic and was therefore unable to direct the series' first episode. Instead, the UK-based Toby Haynes, who was already "high on the list" of potential directors for the series, was hired to direct the first three episodes. Gilroy would remain executive producer and showrunner. In December 2020, Luna was revealed to be executive producing the series.

The seventh episode, titled "Announcement", was written by Stephen Schiff.

=== Writing ===
The previous episodes of Andor had generally followed a three-episode story arc. However, Gilroy had stated that "Announcement" would be the only standalone episode of Andor's first season. He had enjoyed the episode's "announcement of all the ramifications of what happens". The episode had also depicted Colonel Wulff Yularen, who had previously appeared in Star Wars: The Clone Wars. It was considered to be a "relatively rare direct pull from the Star Wars canon" by Zosha Millman from Polygon, as she noted that one of Gilroy's mandates was to refrain from fan service.

=== Filming ===
Filming began in London, England, at the end of November 2020, with the production based at Pinewood Studios. The series was filmed under the working title Pilgrim, and was the first live-action Star Wars series to not make use of the StageCraft digital background technology. Filming locations included Black Park in Buckinghamshire, England for the flashback scenes, as well as at Middle Peak Quarry in Derbyshire, England. In May 2021, filming for the scenes in Niamos had occurred in Cleveleys, Lancashire, England. The local Facebook accounts had received information of filming occurring at the location the previous month, with residents then closing promenades and roads to accommodate for Andor's production. Location manager Jason Allen had chosen the location as he had also been a local resident of the region.

=== Music ===
Nicholas Britell composed the musical score for the episode. The episode's soundtrack was released in November 2022 as part of the second volume of the series.

Andor: Episode 7 (Original Soundtrack)
No.	Title	Length
1.	"Andor (Main Title Theme) – Episode 7"	0:58
2.	"Fuel Purity"	1:17
3.	"Kleya"	1:26
4.	"I Thought He'd Be Here"	1:05
5.	"Niamos! (Coruscant Lounge Mix)"	2:27
6.	"Maarva's Rebellion"	2:54
7.	"Niamos! (Galaxy Mix)"	1:08
8.	"Tourists Don't Run"	2:01
9.	"Six Year Sentence"	1:45
Total length:		15:01

== Release ==
"Announcement" was released on Disney+ on October 19, 2022.

The episode, along with the rest of the first season of Andor was released on Ultra HD Blu-ray and Blu-ray by Walt Disney Studios Home Entertainment on April 30, 2024.

== Reception ==
=== Critical response ===
The review aggregator website Rotten Tomatoes reports a 100% approval rating, based on 19 reviews. The site's critical consensus reads, "Following the delirious highs of its action-packed preceding episode, "Announcement" is not so much a comedown as it is a clarifying breath, vividly setting the stakes for more peril to come."

=== Accolades ===
At the 2023 British Academy Television Craft Awards, Frances Parker's work on the episode was nominated for Best Editing: Fiction.
