= Clara Sola =

2021 film

- Promotional release poster
- Directed by: Nathalie Álvarez Mesén
- Produced by: Nima Yousefi; Alli McConnell (as Alan McConnell)
- Starring: Wendy Chinchilla Araya; Daniel Castañeda Rincón
- Release date: 8 July 2021 (Cannes)
- Running time: 106 minutes
- Countries: Sweden; Costa Rica; Belgium; Germany; France
- Language: Spanish
- Box office: $33,533

Clara Sola is a 2021 drama film directed by Nathalie Álvarez Mesén. It was selected as the Costa Rican entry for the Best International Feature Film at the 94th Academy Awards. The film won the Georges Delerue Award for Best Soundtrack/Sound Design at Film Fest Gent in 2021.

== Plot ==
In a remote Costa Rican village, forty-year-old Clara has a sexual awakening after a lifetime of repression. Clara lives with her tyrannical mother and her deceased sister's daughter Maria, and her work consists mostly of taking care of the horse, Yuca, who only listens to her. Maria, who is close to her aunt, is about to turn 15 and has started dating a young man, Santiago. Clara suffers from a curvature of the spine, but her mother will not allow her to get surgery even though it would be covered by insurance, claiming she must keep her as God gave her. In addition, she treats Clara like a child and does everything she can to prevent her from having any pleasure, including sexual pleasure, by rubbing her fingers with chili peppers so masturbation will be painful, and reminding her that any such feelings are sinful. When she was young, Clara was supposedly visited by the Blessed Virgin Mary, and has acquired a reputation as a mystic and a faith healer; she is occasionally called upon to bless people, in a room her mother equipped with shrines and chairs for visitors. One of Clara's gifts is knowing the secret name of animals and people.

As the story progresses, Clara finds friendship with Santiago and appears to develop feelings for him. After she sees him and her niece having sex, she goes to the forest to pleasure herself, and stays out all night. When she comes back her mother prays for Clara's sexual feelings to be taken away by God, and after prayer burns her hand on a candle. Another crisis builds when the mother tries to sell the horse, to pay for her granddaughter's quinceañera. Clara sends the horse away, and then bathes in the river with Santiago and they embrace. She tells him her secret name: Sola. Later, she takes Maria's birthday dress and runs away, to Santiago, who takes her back—but the dress is ruined.

At the quinceañera, drama ensues when Clara is told a dead mare was found by the river. In a daze, she tries to kiss Santiago, who finally repulses her somewhat forcefully, after which Clara causes a ruckus, and the party is disrupted further by a minor earthquake. The next day, Clara sets fire to the shrine in her house, watches the Madonna burn, and then runs away as the room and then the house catch fire. Her family thinks she is still inside; she keeps running and ends up at the river where she bathed once with Santiago. A series of pops in her back suggest her spine is moving back into place, and in the forest Clara sees Yuca looking at her. After a shot of the deserted river bend, the screen fades to black.

== Cast ==
- Wendy Chinchilla Araya as Clara
- Ana Julia Porras Espinoza as Maria
- Daniel Castañeda Rincón as Santiago
- Flor María Vargas Chavez

== Reception ==
=== Critical response ===
Clara Sola has an approval rating of 92% on review aggregator website Rotten Tomatoes, based on 61 reviews, and an average rating of 7.4/10. The website's critical consensus states: "Discomfiting and dreamy, Clara Sola brings a sensual surreality to a story of oppressed autonomy, with debuting star Wendy Chinchilla Araya providing a mesmerizing focal point. Metacritic assigned the film a weighted average score of 77 out of 100, based on 15 critics, indicating "generally favorable reviews".

=== Accolades ===
Awards and nominations for Clara Sola
Award	Date of ceremony	Category	Recipient(s)	Result	Ref.
Guldbagge Awards	24 January 2022	Best Film		Won	
Guldbagge Awards	24 January 2022	Best Director	Nathalie Álvarez Mesén	Won	
Guldbagge Awards	24 January 2022	Best Screenplay	Nathalie Álvarez Mesén, Maria Camila Arias	Won	
Guldbagge Awards	24 January 2022	Best Cinematography	Sophie Winqvist Loggins	Won	
Guldbagge Awards	24 January 2022	Best Sound/Sound Design	Erick Vargas Williams, Valène Leroy, Charles De Ville, Aline Gavroy	Won	
Guldbagge Awards	24 January 2022	Best Actress in a Leading Role	Wendy Chinchilla Araya	Nominated	
Guldbagge Awards	24 January 2022	Best Actor in a Supporting Role	Daniel Castañeda Rincón	Nominated	
Guldbagge Awards	24 January 2022	Best Editing	Marie-Hélène Dozo	Nominated	
Guldbagge Awards	24 January 2022	Best Visual Effects	Ronald Grauer	Nominated	
International Film Festival of Kerala	25 March 2022	Best Film		Won	
Magritte Awards	4 March 2023	Best Foreign Film in Coproduction		Nominated	

== See also ==
- List of submissions to the 94th Academy Awards for Best International Feature Film
- List of Costa Rican submissions for the Academy Award for Best International Feature Film
