= Nathalie Álvarez Mesén =

Costa Rican-Swedish director (born 1988)

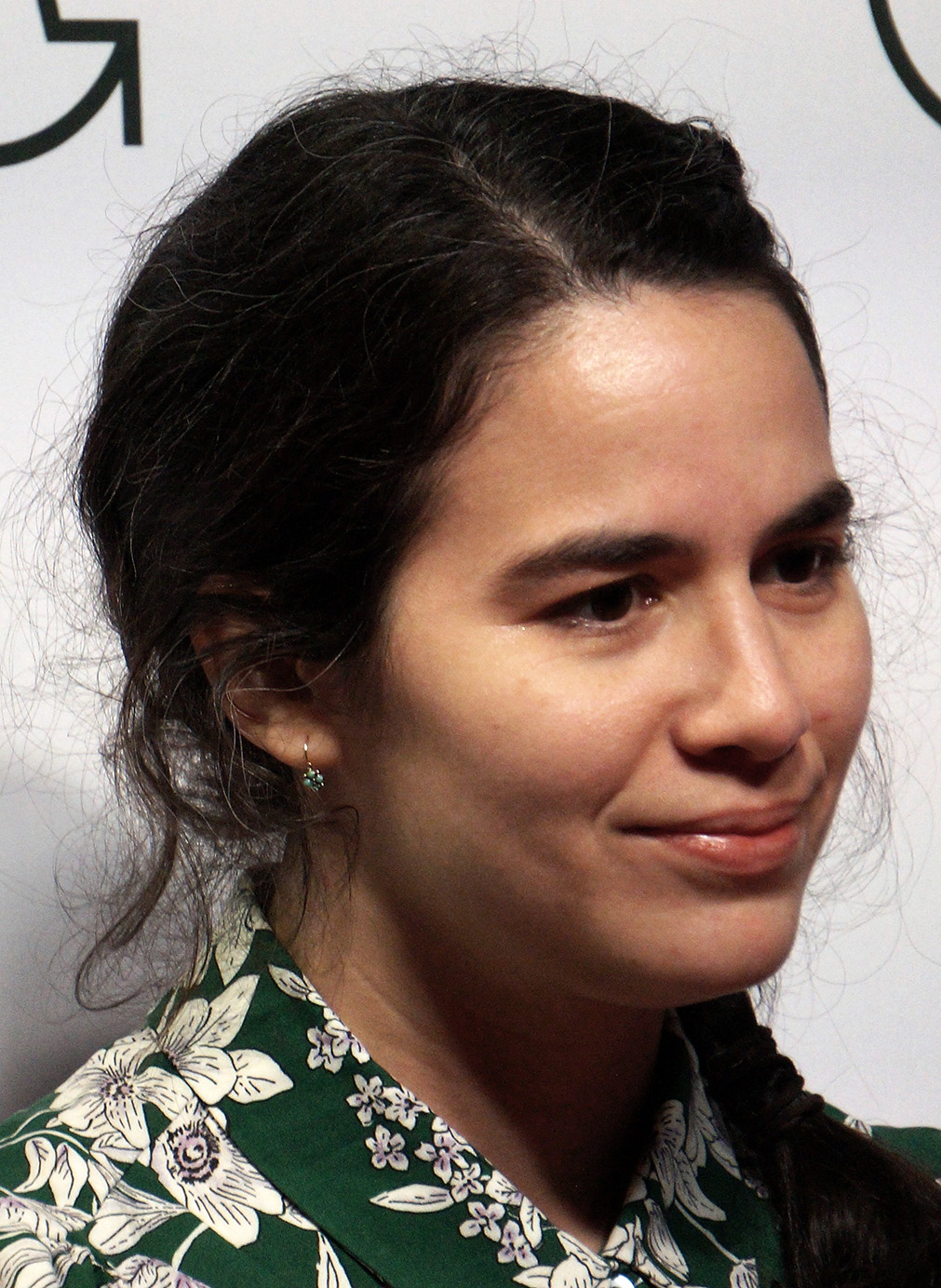
- Nathalie Álvarez Mesén in 2021
- Born: January 15, 1988 (age 38); Stockholm, Sweden
- Education: Stockholm University of the Arts (BFA); Columbia University (MFA)
- Occupation: Director
- Notable work: Clara Sola
- Awards: Guldbagge Award for Best Director (2022); Guldbagge Award for Best Screenplay (2022)

Nathalie Álvarez Mesén (born January 15, 1988) is a Costa Rican-Swedish director. She won the Guldbagge Award for Best Director and Guldbagge Award for Best Screenplay for her 2021 film Clara Sola.

== Biography ==
Álvarez Mesén was born in Sweden, where her parents met. Her mother was born in Costa Rica, studied in Russia, and then went to Sweden, where she met a man from Uruguay. Nathalie moved to Costa Rica when she was seven and attended high school there, then returned to Sweden for university.

Álvarez Mesén began her career in stage acting in Costa Rica before pursuing a BFA in mime acting at the Stockholm University of the Arts. She later earned her MFA from the Columbia University School of the Arts. She is also an alumna of the Berlinale Talents and the Toronto International Film Festival Talent Lab.

Álvarez Mesén's short, Filip (2015), was awarded best live-action film under 15 minutes at the 2016 Palm Springs International Festival of Short Films. Her short, Asunder (2015), premiered at the 2015 Stockholm International Film Festival and screened during the 2016 Telluride Film Festival, where it was curated by Barry Jenkins as part of the "Calling Cards" program. She also co-wrote the short film Entre Tu y Milagros (2020), which won the Orizzonti Award for Best Short Film at the Venice Film Festival.

In 2022, Álvarez Mesén received the Guldbagge Award for Best Director and Best Screenplay for her debut, Clara Sola, a film set in Costa Rica about a 42-year-old woman who sets off on a journey to break free from socioreligious conventions and assert her sexuality. The movie was nominated for a Platino Award for Best First Feature Film and was Costa Rica's selection for the Academy Award for Best International Feature Film.

== Filmography ==
| Year | Title | Notes |
|---|---|---|
| 2022 | Clara Sola | |
| 2026 | The Wolf Will Tear Your Immaculate Hands | Post-production |
