= Beau Willimon =

American playwright, screenwriter (born 1977)

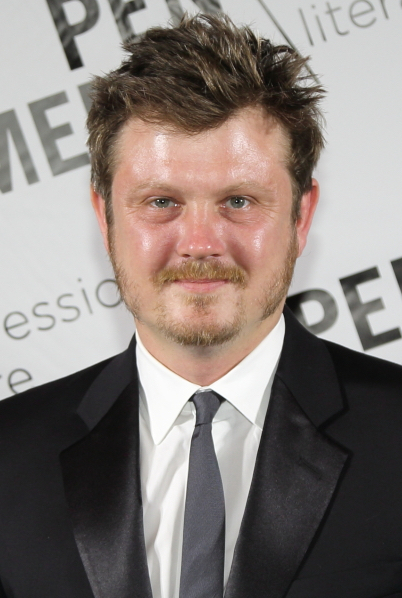
- Willimon in 2015
- Born: Pack Beauregard Willimon; October 26, 1977 (age 48); Alexandria, Virginia, U.S.
- Education: Columbia University (BA, MFA); Juilliard School (GrDip)
- Occupations: Playwright, screenwriter, producer
- Title: President of the Writers Guild of America, East
- Term: 2017–2021

Pack Beauregard Willimon (born October 26, 1977) is an American playwright and screenwriter. He developed the American version of the series House of Cards, serving as showrunner for the first four seasons. In 2018, Willimon created the drama series The First for Hulu, about the first crewed mission to Mars. He was also a writer on both seasons of the Disney+ series Andor.

== Early life and education ==
Beau Willimon was born in Alexandria, Virginia, to Nancy and Henry Pack Willimon. His father was a captain in the United States Navy and the family moved frequently. Willimon lived in Hawaii, San Francisco, California, and Philadelphia, Pennsylvania, before settling in St. Louis, Missouri, after Willimon's father retired to become a lawyer.

Willimon attended John Burroughs School, where he took drama classes taught by Jon Hamm and graduated in 1995. He majored in history and visual arts and received a BA from Columbia University in 1999. When he was an undergraduate, he met Jay Carson. In 1998, he worked as a volunteer and intern for the Senate campaign of Charles Schumer, which led to jobs with Hillary Clinton's 2000 Senate campaign, Bill Bradley's 2000 presidential campaign, and Howard Dean's 2004 presidential campaign. After graduating, he worked for the ministry of the interior for the Estonian government in Tallinn as part of a fellowship, during which he sorted through and wrote summaries of thousands of pages of E.U.-related documents. Shortly after, he moved to Vietnam to work for a small cultural magazine, and there did research for his first screenplay, based on the life of Tomas Vu, a visual arts professor at Columbia who grew up in Vietnam during the war.

He returned to New York to attend Columbia's School of the Arts. One of his mentors was playwright Eduardo Machado. Willimon said, "I was the worst student by far in our group. A lot of these people had known they wanted to be playwrights forever. I didn't know a soul in the theater world, and I didn't have the faintest idea how to truly write a play. But I quit drinking then and really committed myself to this path." During graduate school, he received a visual arts scholarship for a proposal to create 40 lithographs about paranoia, and lived in South Africa for a year. After receiving an MFA in Playwriting from the School of the Arts in 2003, he worked in odd jobs, including gallery and painter's assistant, set builder, finding jobs for the homeless, barista, and an instructor teaching SAT prep classes. He also did an internship with New Dramatists.

Willimon subsequently enrolled at the Juilliard School's Lila Acheson Wallace American Playwrights Program, receiving both the Lila Acheson Wallace Juilliard Playwriting Fellowship and the Lincoln Center Le Compte du Nuoy Award.

== Career ==
At Juilliard, he wrote a play, Farragut North, that was inspired by his experience as press aide for Dean's 2004 campaign for President. In fall 2008, it premiered off Broadway at the Atlantic Theater Company in a production starring John Gallagher Jr., Chris Noth, and Olivia Thirlby. The production received a Los Angeles run the following summer, with Chris Pine in the starring role. Concurrently it received a production at the Contemporary American Theater Festival at Shepherd University in July 2009. Willimon was nominated in 2009 for the John Gassner Award by the Outer Critics Circle.

Other plays include Lower Ninth, produced in 2007 by the SPF and The Flea Theater in 2008; Zusammenbruch, produced in 2008 at the American Airlines Theater and directed by Thomas Kail; Spirit Control, produced in 2010 by the Manhattan Theatre Club; The Parisian Woman, produced in 2013 by South Coast Repertory; and Breathing Time, produced in 2014 by Fault Line Theater.

Willimon's work has also been developed and performed at MCC Theater, Ars Nova, HERE Arts Center, the Phoenix Theatre, the Actors Theater of Chicago, Battersea Arts Centre in London, Cherry Lane Theatre, and the South Coast Repertory.

A film adaption of Farragut North, retitled The Ides of March, premiered in October 2011. The movie was directed by George Clooney; the script was written by Willimon, Clooney and his producing partner, Grant Heslov. It starred Clooney, Ryan Gosling, Evan Rachel Wood, Philip Seymour Hoffman, Paul Giamatti, Marisa Tomei, and Jeffrey Wright. The film was nominated in 2012 for the Academy Award for Best Adapted Screenplay, and for four Golden Globe Awards, including Best Picture – Drama and Best Screenplay.

In September 2017, Willimon was elected for a two-year term as President of the Writers Guild of America, East, running unopposed. He was re-elected without opposition in 2019.

Hulu gave a straight-to-series order to The First in May 2017 (co-produced with Channel 4). It debuted in 2018, but was not renewed for a second season. The show portrays members of a team of astronauts as they become the first humans to visit Mars.

In 2019, as WGA-E President, Willimon oversaw the negotiating committee for the "WGA-Agency Agreement", and joined other WGA members in firing his agents as part of the guild's stand against the ATA after the two sides were unable to come to an agreement on a new "Code of Conduct" that addressed the practice of packaging. In 2021, he signed a first look deal with Entertainment One.

=== House of Cards ===
In 2012, Willimon developed House of Cards, the American adaptation of the BBC series of the same name, for Netflix. It was produced by Media Rights Capital, David Fincher, and Kevin Spacey, and for five seasons starred Spacey as ruthless politician Frank Underwood and Robin Wright as his equally scheming wife Claire. The series also stars Kate Mara, Corey Stoll, Michael Kelly, Neve Campbell, Michel Gill, Jayne Atkinson, Sebastian Arcelus and Lars Mikkelsen. It premiered on Netflix on February 1, 2013.

Willimon served as the series' showrunner for its first four seasons, stepping down in January 2016. House of Cards premiered its sixth and final season on November 2, 2018.

On November 3, 2017, Netflix fired Spacey from House of Cards and cut all ties with the actor following several allegations of sexual misconduct. Several crew members on the House of Cards set accused Spacey of sexually harassing them. When the accusations first surfaced in late October of that year, Willimon released a statement saying, "During the time I worked with Kevin Spacey on House of Cards, I neither witnessed nor was aware of any inappropriate behavior on set or off". However, three House of Cards crew members have disputed that assertion, commenting anonymously in a BuzzFeed News article that Willimon was aware of Spacey's behavior, including an incident during the show's first season in which Spacey allegedly sexually assaulted a production assistant, and took no action against the actor. A "higher-level source" for the article alleged that Willimon witnessed Spacey behaving inappropriately. Willimon denied witnessing or knowing about the alleged assault, but said, “I am heartsick that anyone on the crew had to endure this sort of behavior. Clearly we as an industry, particularly those in a position of power, myself included, need to be more perceptive and proactive. We also need to do a better job at empowering and supporting our colleagues who come forward.”

== Works ==
=== Plays ===
Year	Title	Notes
2008	Farragut North	
2008	Lower Ninth	
2008	Zusammenbruch	As part of The 24 Hour Plays Off Broadway
2010	Spirit Control	
2013	The Parisian Woman	
2014	Breathing Time	

=== Feature films ===
Year	Title	Writer	Producer	Notes
2011	The Ides of March	Yes	Co-producer	Based on play Farragut North
2013	A Master Builder	No	Executive	
2018	Mary Queen of Scots	Yes	No	
2024	Xoftex	No	Yes	
2029	Game of Thrones: Aegon's Conquest †	Yes	No	Based on novel Fire & Blood

=== Documentary films ===
Year	Title	Director	Concept	Producer	Executive producer	Notes
2015	The Walk Around the World	No	No	No	Yes	Shorts
2015	Curt	No	No	No	Yes	Shorts
2015	Johnny Cash: American Rebel	No	No	No	Yes	
2020	By Hand	No	No	Yes	No	
2020	Lights of Baltimore	No	No	Yes	No	
2026	In Case We Never Meet Again	Yes	Yes	Yes	No	

=== Television series ===
Year(s)	Title	Writer	Executive producer	Creator	Notes
2013—2018	House of Cards	Yes	Yes	Yes	Creator (73 episodes); Writer (23 episodes); Executive producer (52 episodes)
2018	The First	Yes	Yes	Yes	Creator and executive producer (8 episodes); Writer (3 episodes)
2020	Grand Army	No	Yes	No	9 episodes
2022—2025	Andor	Yes	No	No	6 episodes
2025—present	Severance	No	Yes	No	

== Accolades ==
Year	Association	Category	Project	Result
2011	Academy Award	Best Adapted Screenplay	The Ides of March	Nominated
2011	BAFTA Awards	Best Adapted Screenplay	The Ides of March	Nominated
2011	Golden Globe Award	Best Screenplay	The Ides of March	Nominated
2013	Primetime Emmy Awards	Outstanding Drama Series	House of Cards	Nominated
2014	Primetime Emmy Awards	Outstanding Drama Series	House of Cards	Nominated
2014	Primetime Emmy Awards	Outstanding Writing for a Drama Series	House of Cards	Nominated
2015	Primetime Emmy Awards	Outstanding Drama Series	House of Cards	Nominated
2016	Primetime Emmy Awards	Outstanding Drama Series	House of Cards	Nominated
2023	Primetime Emmy Awards	Outstanding Writing for a Drama Series	Andor (for "One Way Out")	Nominated
2025	Primetime Emmy Awards	Outstanding Drama Series	Severance	Nominated
