= Cruachan Power Station =

Hydroelectric power station in Scotland

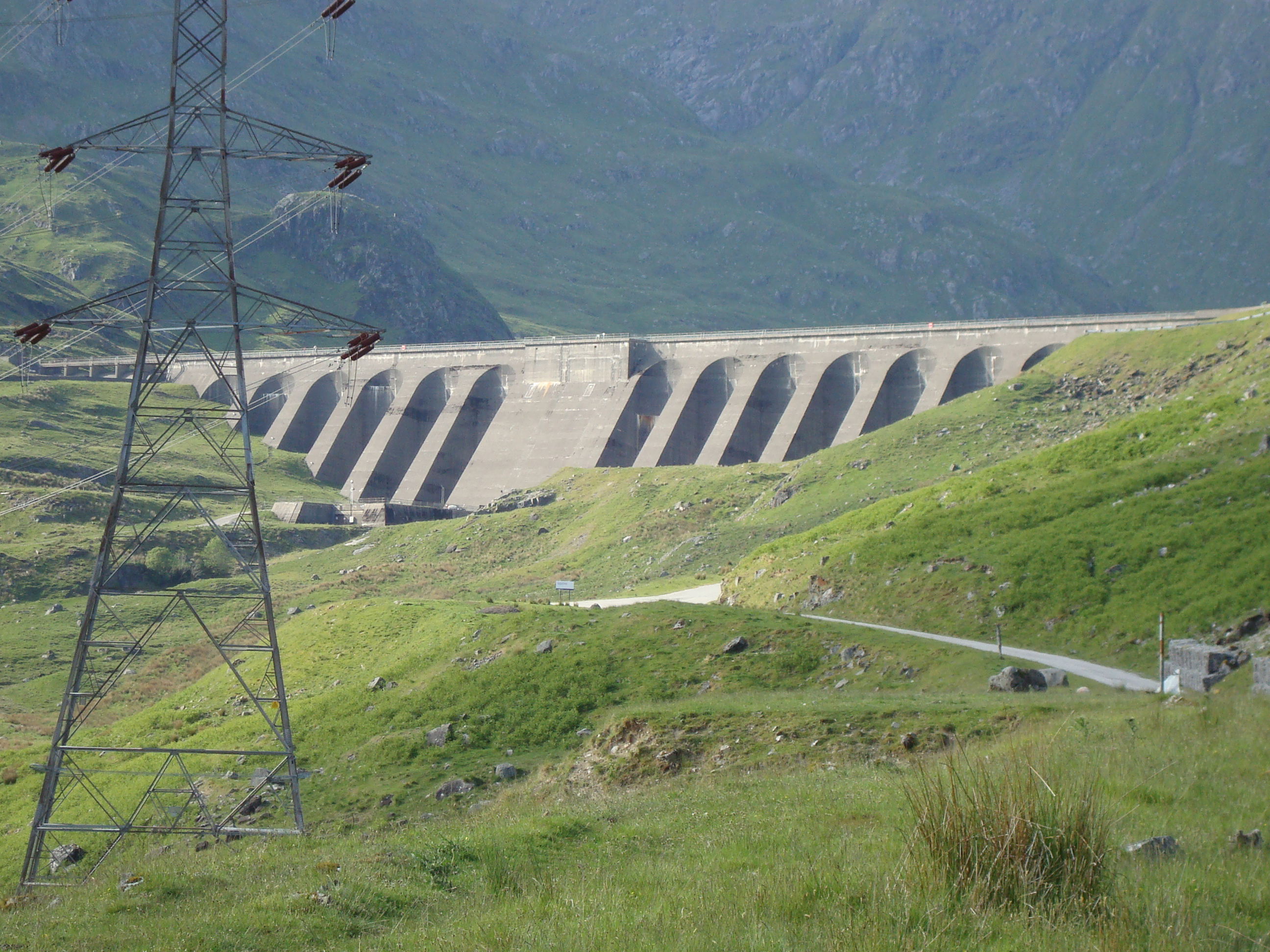
- The dam containing the upper reservoir
- Interactive map of Cruachan Power Station
- Country: Scotland
- Location: Argyll and Bute
- Coordinates: 56°24′23″N 05°06′47″W
- Status: Operational
- Construction began: 1959
- Opening date: 15 October 1965
- Owner: Drax Power

Upper reservoir
- Creates: Cruachan Reservoir
- Total capacity: 10,000,000 m^{3} (350,000,000 cu ft) (7 GWh)

Lower reservoir
- Creates: Loch Awe

Power Station
- Hydraulic head: 396 m (1,299 ft)
- Pump-generators: 4
- Installed capacity: 440 MW (590,000 hp)
- Annual generation: 705 GWh (2,540 TJ) (2009)
- Website www.visitcruachan.co.uk

The Cruachan Power Station (also known as the Cruachan Dam) is a pumped-storage hydroelectric power station in Argyll and Bute, Scotland, UK. The scheme can provide 440 MW of power and produced 705 GWh in 2009.

The turbine hall is located inside Ben Cruachan, and the scheme moves water between Cruachan Reservoir and Loch Awe, a height difference of 396 m (1,299 ft). It is one of only four pumped storage power stations in the United Kingdom, and is capable of providing a black start capability to the National Grid.

Construction began in 1959 to coincide with the Hunterston A nuclear power station in Ayrshire. Cruachan uses cheap electricity generated at night to pump water to the higher reservoir, which can then be released during the day to provide power as necessary. The power station is open to visitors, and around 50,000 tourists visit it each year.

== Location ==
The power station is on the A85 road, about 8 km (5.0 miles) west of Dalmally, on a branch of Loch Awe leading to the River Awe, which is the outflow from the loch, at its north west corner. There is a seasonally open Falls of Cruachan railway station nearby.

== History ==
Construction commenced in 1959, and the power station was opened by Queen Elizabeth II on 15 October 1965. The concept was designed by Sir Edward MacColl, who died before it opened. The civil engineering design of the scheme was carried out by James Williamson & Partners of Glasgow, and the main project contractors were William Tawse of Aberdeen and Edmund Nuttall of Camberley. Consulting electrical engineers were Merz & McLellan of Newcastle upon Tyne. At the peak of the construction, there were around 4,000 people working on the project. Thirty-six men died in the construction of the power station and dam. The cost of the scheme was £24.5 million.

Cruachan was one of the first reversible pumped-storage systems, where the same turbines are used as both pumps and generators. Previous pumped-storage systems used separate pumps with a network of pipes to return water to the upper reservoir, making them more expensive to build than conventional hydroelectric systems. Cruachan is pre-dated by the smaller 232 megawatts (311,000 hp) Lünerseewerk (de) (Austria, 1958) and the 360 megawatts (480,000 hp) Ffestiniog Power Station (Wales, 1963). It is one of four pumped storage schemes in the United Kingdom.

Its construction was linked to that of Hunterston A nuclear power station, to store surplus night-time nuclear-generated electrical energy. The power station was originally operated by the North of Scotland Hydro-Electric Board, before being transferred to the South of Scotland Electricity Board. It was owned by ScottishPower from the privatisation of Britain's electricity industry in 1990 until Drax Group purchased it along with other ScottishPower assets on 1 January 2019.

Maintenance of the penstocks, which formerly required them to be drained, is now done using a remotely operated underwater vehicle.

To commemorate the 50th anniversary of the station's opening, a 2015 BBC radio documentary Inside the Rock described its construction.

== Design ==
The Cruachan station temporarily stores energy at times of low demand, and releases it at times of high demand, when electricity prices are higher, reducing the maximum power that must be provided by other power stations. It is also used to cope with sudden surges in the demand for electricity, such as at the end of popular television programmes. Despite the use of some rainwater, Cruachan is not a net generator of electricity: it uses more energy for pumping water and spinning its turbines than it generates.

Water is pumped from Loch Awe to the upper reservoir, 396 m (1,299 ft) above, during periods of low energy use (most often at night), and then released when needed. The upper reservoir also receives rainwater, supplemented by a network of 19 km (12 miles) of tunnels. Around 10% of the energy from the station is generated from rainwater; the rest is from the water pumped up from Loch Awe.

The station is capable of generating 440 megawatts (590,000 hp) of electricity from four turbines, two of 100 megawatts (130,000 hp) and two of 120 megawatts (160,000 hp) capacity, after two units were upgraded in 2005. It can go from standby to full production in two minutes, or 30 seconds if compressed air is used to start the turbines spinning. When the top reservoir is full, Cruachan can operate for 22 hours before the supply of water is exhausted. At full power, the turbines can pump at 167 cubic metres (5,900 cu ft) per second and generate at 200 cubic metres (7,100 cu ft) per second.

The power station is required to keep a 12-hour water supply in order to provide a black start capability to the National Grid, to enable utilities to be restarted without access to external power. It began supplying grid inertia in 2020.

In June 2021, Drax applied to build a further 600 MW pumped storage system using the same reservoir, to a combined 1 GW for seven hours of storage. Approval was granted in July 2023, and Drax intended to complete the project in 2030. Several financing modes are possible for the £500M project. Seismic surveys began in June 2024. In May 2025, Drax put the expansion on hold citing rising costs of the project.

=== Turbine hall ===
There are four Francis turbines, which operate as both pumps and generators. These are housed in a cavern within Ben Cruachan, which is 91.5 m (300 ft) long, 23.5 m (77 ft) wide and 38 m (125 ft) high, with an adjacent transformer hall. The chamber is at a depth of around 300 m (980 ft), and is within a hard granite intrusion. Construction of the power station required the removal of 220,000 cubic metres (7,800,000 cu ft) of rock. Access to the hall is gained by a road tunnel 1 km (0.62 miles) long, 4 m (13 ft) high and 7 m (23 ft) wide, which is warm and humid enough to allow tropical plants to grow.

The transformers step up the voltage from 16 kV to 275 kV for transmission. Six oil-filled cables carry the electric current up a cable shaft to a point in front of the dam, and from there it is carried on pylons to Dalmally 8 km (5.0 miles) to the east. The staircase in the cable shaft has 1,420 steps, making it the tallest in Britain.

After passing through the turbines, the water enters a surge chamber designed to balance fluctuations in the level of water before entering the tailrace tunnel to Loch Awe, which is 7 m (23 ft) in diameter and 935 m (3,068 ft) long.

=== Reservoir ===
The Cruachan Reservoir is 396 m (1,299 ft) above Loch Awe, and is contained by a dam 316 m (1,037 ft) long. The reservoir has a catchment area of 23 km^{2} (8.9 sq mi), and is capable of holding 7 gigawatt-hours (25 TJ) of energy. Environmental restrictions meant that the dam had to have a "clean" appearance, so the operational equipment is housed within the dam wall.

The penstocks are a pair of tunnels, 260 m (850 ft) long and inclined at 56° from the horizontal with a 5.3 m (17 ft) diameter, which then bifurcate into four steel lined 190 m (620 ft) long, 2.5 m (8 ft 2 in) diameter shafts. The penstocks underwent a major inspection and refurbishment in 2003.

== Tourist attraction ==
The power station was listed by the conservation organisation DoCoMoMo as one of the sixty key monuments of post-war Scottish architecture. In November 2012, the power station received the Institution of Mechanical Engineers' Engineering Heritage Award.

A visitor centre, refurbished in 2009, is sited by the outflow to Loch Awe and receives around 50,000 visitors a year.

The power station houses a three-section 48 ft × 12 ft (14.6 m × 3.7 m) modernist mural in wood, plastic and gold leaf by English artist Elizabeth Falconer. The mural includes Celtic crosses, pylons, mythical beasts, and men of industry. The first section depicts the mythical Cailleach Bheur, who guarded the spring underneath the mountain. The middle panel commemorates 15 workers killed when the roof of the turbine hall collapsed, and the final section shows the station working.

== Popular culture ==
In the Disney+ Star Wars series Andor episode six "The Eye", the Cruachan Power Station appeared as the Empire's supply hub on the planet Aldhani.

The dam was also featured in the season 7 episode 5 "Singapore" of the series Outlander.

== Sources ==
- Fleetwood, David (2010). Power to the People (PDF). Historic Scotland. ISBN 978-1-84917-036-9.
