= Duncan Pow =

British actor

- Born: 8 October 1977 (age 48); Edinburgh, Scotland
- Education: The Blue School, Wells
- Alma mater: University of Edinburgh; Leeds Metropolitan University
- Occupation: Actor
- Years active: 2005-present
- Spouse: Yuridia Ortega Correa (m. 2016)

Duncan Pow (born 8 October 1977) is a British actor. He is known in the United Kingdom for television roles in the Sky 1 series Dream Team, and the BBC One series Holby City. He is known internationally for his role as Ruescott Melshi in the Star Wars film Rogue One (2016) and the Disney+ prequel series Andor (2022–2025).

== Early life ==
Pow was born in Edinburgh, and moved to Wells, England, when he was eleven. Pow attended The Blue School, Wells, going on to study mathematics at the University of Edinburgh and multimedia technology at Leeds Metropolitan University where he received a first class honours degree.

== Career ==
Pow began his acting career in 2005 appearing in a Channel 4 TV miniseries titled Psycho. Also in 2005, he first appeared in the Sky 1 drama series Dream Team as the character Liam MacKay. Pow appeared in 61 episodes until the show ended in 2007.'

From 2008 until 2010, Pow played a starring role in the medical drama Holby City, a series that aired weekly on BBC One. It was announced on 6 November 2007 that Pow had been cast in the role of Linden Cullen, when series producer Diana Kyle described the new character as "dishy... good-looking and sexy." In the context of the show, Linden was introduced as the new head of the hospital's Acute Assessment Unit at the end of the ninth series. He made his first appearance in the episode "Stolen", broadcast on 15 January 2008. The character was the head of Holby City Hospital's surgical admissions ward.

In an interview a year into his time in this leading role on the show, Pow commented: "I don't think I've ever enjoyed a job as much. It is a pleasure to get up every morning and spend my days working at Holby. From the producers, writers, and production staff through to the crew and the cast, everyone is lovely to work with and the atmosphere is always positive and good fun. What more could I wish for? I'm getting paid to do something I love [...] Linden is a very complex character to play and getting your teeth into him has been a dream, any actor would relish the opportunity, I just feel lucky and privileged that it was me that was given the chance."

In 2009, Linden was voted Holby City fans' "Favourite Newcomer of Series 10", receiving 58.5% of the vote. Pow commented on his character's popularity and award win: "I try not to think too much about Linden and how he is viewed by fans." I think it's great that you guys voted Linden as best newcomer and that he has been well received but I guess the fact he has a fan base is down to Tony McHale, Diana Kyle and the writing team for coming up with such an interesting character, and Tony, Diana, Liz Stoll and Julia Crampsie for giving me the opportunity to play him." Discussing the feedback he receives from viewers about Linden, Pow explained that people "like his honesty and dedication to others," commenting that "he's quite selfless, I guess, and that is an incredibly endearing quality".

He was killed off at the end of the twelfth series on 12 October 2010. Pow appeared in 137 episodes of the show.

Afterwards, Pow appeared in more television programmes in the UK and US, including The Wrong Mans (2013), Waterloo Road (2013), Law & Order: UK (2014), 24: Live Another Day (2014), Humans (2015), The Night Manager (2016), and Black Mirror (2016).

Throughout his career, Pow has appeared in independent films. In 2016, he played the role of Ruescott Melshi in Rogue One: A Star Wars Story (2016). The character is a sergeant in the Special Forces of the Alliance to restore the Republic and helps Cassian Andor and Jyn Erso.

After his first appearance in the Star Wars franchise, Pow has continued his career in television, appearing in Playground (2017), Henry IX (2017), Silent Witness (2018), The Salisbury Poisonings (2020), La Fortuna (2021), and Halo (2022). He also appeared in the video game Tom Clancy's Ghost Recon Breakpoint (2019), before reprising his role as Melshi in Andor (2022). In the series, Melshi and Andor meet for the first time as fellow inmates on level 5 of the Imperial factory facility on Narkina 5, and breakout together to later join the Rebel Alliance. The character first appears in episode 8 "Narkina 5", first aired on Disney+ on October 26 2022. Pow appears again in episode 9 "Nobody's Listening!", episode 10 "One Way Out", and episode 11 "Daughter of Ferrix".

The decision to bring Pow back to the Star Wars franchise was made by Tony Gilroy, creator of Andor. As reported by series writer Beau Willimon in an interview with Collider "I remember Tony talking about how much he enjoyed working with that actor and was looking for an opportunity to bring Melshi back... I don't remember who said it out loud first, but what if Melshi's in that prison? And it's like, "Oh, my god."" Gilroy stated "I love the character. Duncan Pow, who plays Melshi, was a great hang on Rogue, and I just really liked him. So I was just like, "How can we get him back in?"".

== Personal life ==
=== Charity work and support ===
Pow is a supporter of the children's cancer charity, CLIC Sargent having experience of the charity's work through personal circumstances. When his cousin, Westley Hendry, died of cancer aged 16, the family was supported by CLIC Sargent and he has since been an active supporter. He won a Holby City special edition of the BBC quiz show The Weakest Link and raised £8,600 for the charity. Pow ran the 2008 Great South Run in Portsmouth for CLIC Sargent and completed the Flora London Marathon for CLIC Sargent in 2009.

Pow is the patron of the Leon Heart Fund, which was named after Leon Montanari and helps children and families who visit the University Hospital of Wales' Paediatric Cardiology Department. He has helped raise money for the cancer charity by appearing on the ITV show This Morning several times.

== Filmography ==
Key
†	Denotes works that have not yet been released

=== Film ===
Year	Title	Role	Notes	Ref.
2011	Here's to Big Bear	Joe	Short film	
2014	The Journey	Jason		
2014	Blackwood	Lee		
2015	The Chameleon	Detective Eigner		
2016	Dark Signal	Nick Keller		
2016	Rogue One: A Star Wars Story	Ruescott Melshi		
2021	Dune	Hawat Officer	Uncredited	

=== Television ===
Year	Title	Role	Notes	Ref.
2005	Psycho	Kevin	Episode: "Kill Me If You Can"	
2005–2007	Dream Team	Liam Mackay	61 episodes	
2008–2010	Holby City	Linden Cullen	136 episodes	
2010	Doctors	Gary Sneddon	Episode: "Father to the Man"	
2013	Waterloo Road	Frankie McGregor	Episode: "Father Figure"	
2013	The Wrong Mans	Petr	2 episodes	
2014	Doctors	Patrick Borley	Episode: "White Van"	
2014	Law & Order UK	David Winkleman	Episode: "Flaw"	
2014	24: Live Another Day	Captain Greg Denovo	3 episodes	
2014	Lovesick	Gareth	Episode: "Bethany"	
2015	Humans	Dr. Sanzen	Episode: "1.8"	
2015	Unforgotten	Tom	3 episodes	
2015	Serial Thriller	Detective Eigner	2 episodes	
2016	The Night Manager	Charles Narramore	Miniseries; Episode: "1.2"	
2016	Black Mirror	Garrett Scholes	Episode: "Hated in the Nation"	
2016	Suspicion	JD Douglas	Episode: "A Daughter Disappears"	
2017	Playground	Mike	10 episodes	
2017	Henry IX	Byron	3 episodes	
2017	Trust Me	Rob Beasley	2 episodes	
2018	Silent Witness	Gary Hadlow	2 episodes	
2018	Flowers	Dennis	2 episodes	
2019	The Rook	Damien Soames	Miniseries; Episode: "Chapter 1"	
2019	The Last Czars	Yakov Yurovsky	3 episodes	
2019–2020	Traces	Patrick Monk	2 episodes	
2020	The Salisbury Poisonings	Dr. James Haslam	Docudrama; 3 episodes	
2021	La Fortuna	Tony	5 episodes	
2022	Halo	John's Father	5 episodes	
2022–2025	Andor	Ruescott Melshi	7 episodes	
2023	For Her Sins	Rob	4 episodes	
2023	Colosseum	Trajan	Docuseries; 2 episodes	
2026	Blade Runner 2099 †	Observer Pavlov	Miniseries; post-production	

=== Video games ===
Year	Title	Role	Notes	Ref.
2019	Tom Clancy's Ghost Recon Breakpoint	Karel Sekulic	Deep State DLC	
2023	Diablo IV	Additional voices		
2024	Still Wakes the Deep	Muir, Douglas		
