= Bronte Carmichael =

English actress (born 2006)

- Born: Bronte Belle Carmichael-Sturrock; 24 October 2006 (age 19); Bristol, England
- Other name: Bronte Carmichael-Sturrock
- Occupation: Actor
- Years active: 2016—present
- Parents: Tristan Sturrock (father); Katy Carmichael (mother)

Bronte Belle Carmichael-Sturrock (born 24 October 2006) is an English actress. She began her career as a child actress in the film Christopher Robin and the Syfy series Nightflyers (both 2018). She later appeared in the Disney+ series Andor (2022–2025).

== Early life ==
Carmichael is from Bristol and the daughter of Katy Carmichael and Tristan Sturrock.

== Career ==
Carmichael made her feature film debut in 2017 debut when she was nine years old as Young Girl On The Tube in Darkest Hour. The same year she also played Chloe Morrell in On Chesil Beach written by Ian McEwan adapted for screen from his novel of the same name.

In 2018, Carmichael starred alongside Ewan McGregor and Hayley Atwell in the film Christopher Robin as their daughter Madeline Robin. and played Skye D'Branin in Nightflyers, an American sci-fi horror series for Syfy and Netflix based on George R. R. Martin's novella. The following year, she appeared as Martha, one of Varys's spies in the final season of Game of Thrones on HBO. Carmichael appeared in Raised by Wolves directed by Ridley Scott in 2020.

Carmichael is the voice of Robin in the 2021 stop motion short film Robin Robin made by Aardman for Netflix. It was nominated for an Oscar for Best Animated Short Film at the 94th Academy Awards.

In 2022, Carmichael joined the cast of the Disney+ Star Wars prequel series Andor as Leida Mothma, the daughter of senator Mon Mothma (Genevieve O'Reilly).

She played Young Biddy in Steven Knight's 2023 adaptation of Great Expectations for the BBC and Julia in the second season of the Paramount+ science fiction series Halo in 2024.

In 2025 it was announced that Carmichael had joined the cast of Nathalie Álvarez Mesén's 2026 gothic horror film The Wolf Will Tear Your Immaculate Hands as the daughter of a British widower (played by Alexander Skaarsgard).

== Filmography ==
=== Film ===
Year	Title	Role	Notes
2017	Darkest Hour	Young Girl On The Tube	
2017	On Chesil Beach	Chloe Morrell	
2018	Christopher Robin	Madeline Robin	2018 40th Annual Young Artist Award nominee
2021	Robin Robin	Robin	Short film
2026	The Wolf Will Tear Your Immaculate Hands	Helena	

=== Television ===
Year	Title	Role	Notes
2017	Three Girls	Holly Winshaw's sister	
2018	The Laura Marlin Mysteries: Dead Man's Cove	Laura Marlin	Television film (unreleased)
2018	Nightlyers	Skye D'Branin	7 episodes
2019	Game of Thrones	Martha	2 episodes (season 8)
2020	Raised by Wolves	Spiria (aged 12)	1 episode
2022–2025	Andor	Leida Mothma	9 episodes
2023	Great Expectations	Young Biddy	2 episodes
2024	Halo	Julia	2 episodes (season 2)
