= Black Park =

Country park in Buckinghamshire, England

Coordinates: 51°32′10″N 0°32′50″W

- Site of Special Scientific Interest
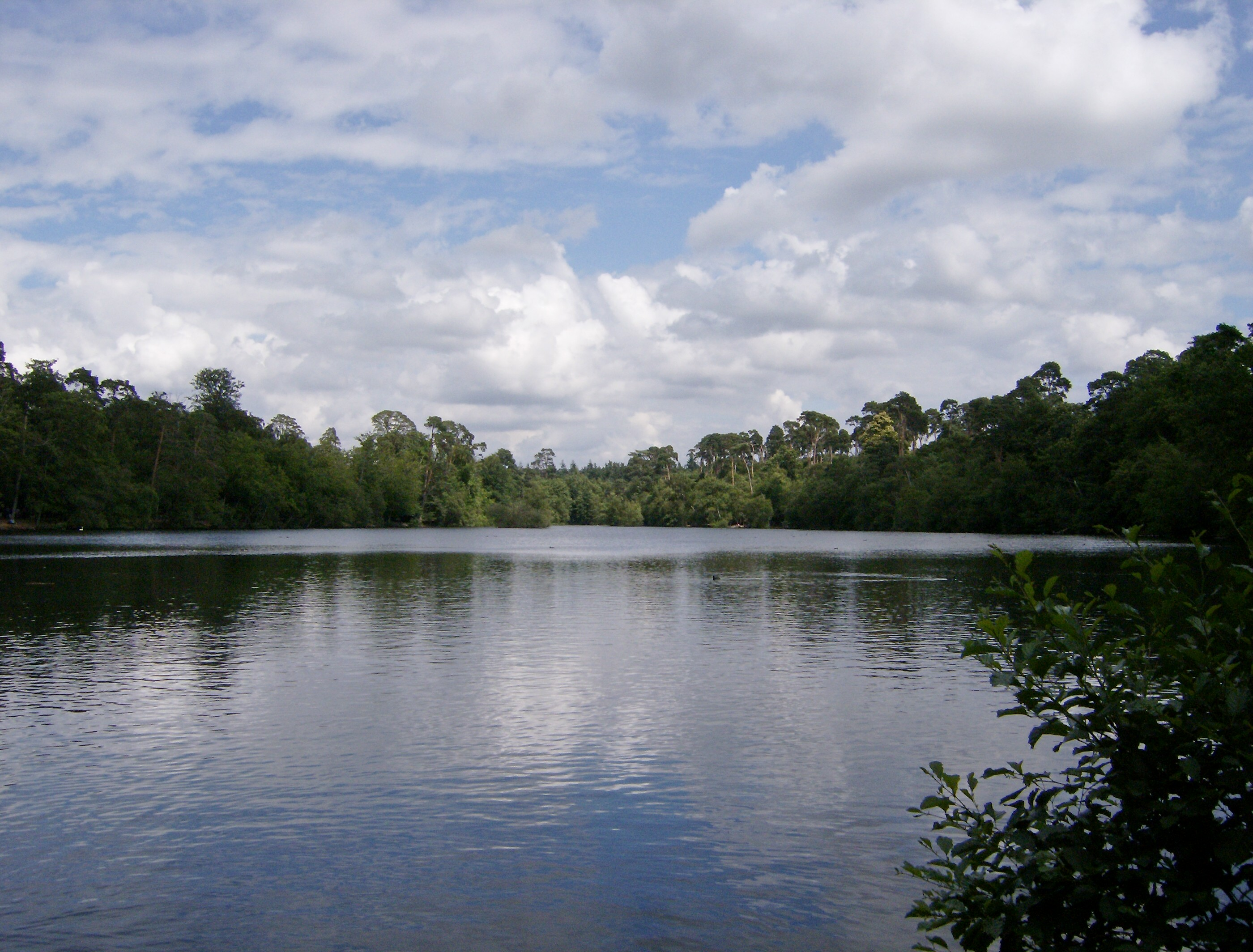
- Location of Black Park.
- Area of search: Buckinghamshire
- Grid reference: TQ013842
- Interest: Biological
- Area: 15.3 ha (38 acres)
- Notification date: 1990
- Location map: Magic Map

Black Park is a country park in Wexham, Buckinghamshire, England to the north of the A412 road. It is managed by Buckinghamshire Council, formerly County Council. It has an area of 250 hectares (618 acres), of which two separate areas totalling 15.7 hectares (39 acres) have been designated a biological Site of Special Scientific Interest (SSSI). and a larger area of 66 hectares is a local nature reserve.

== Wildlife ==
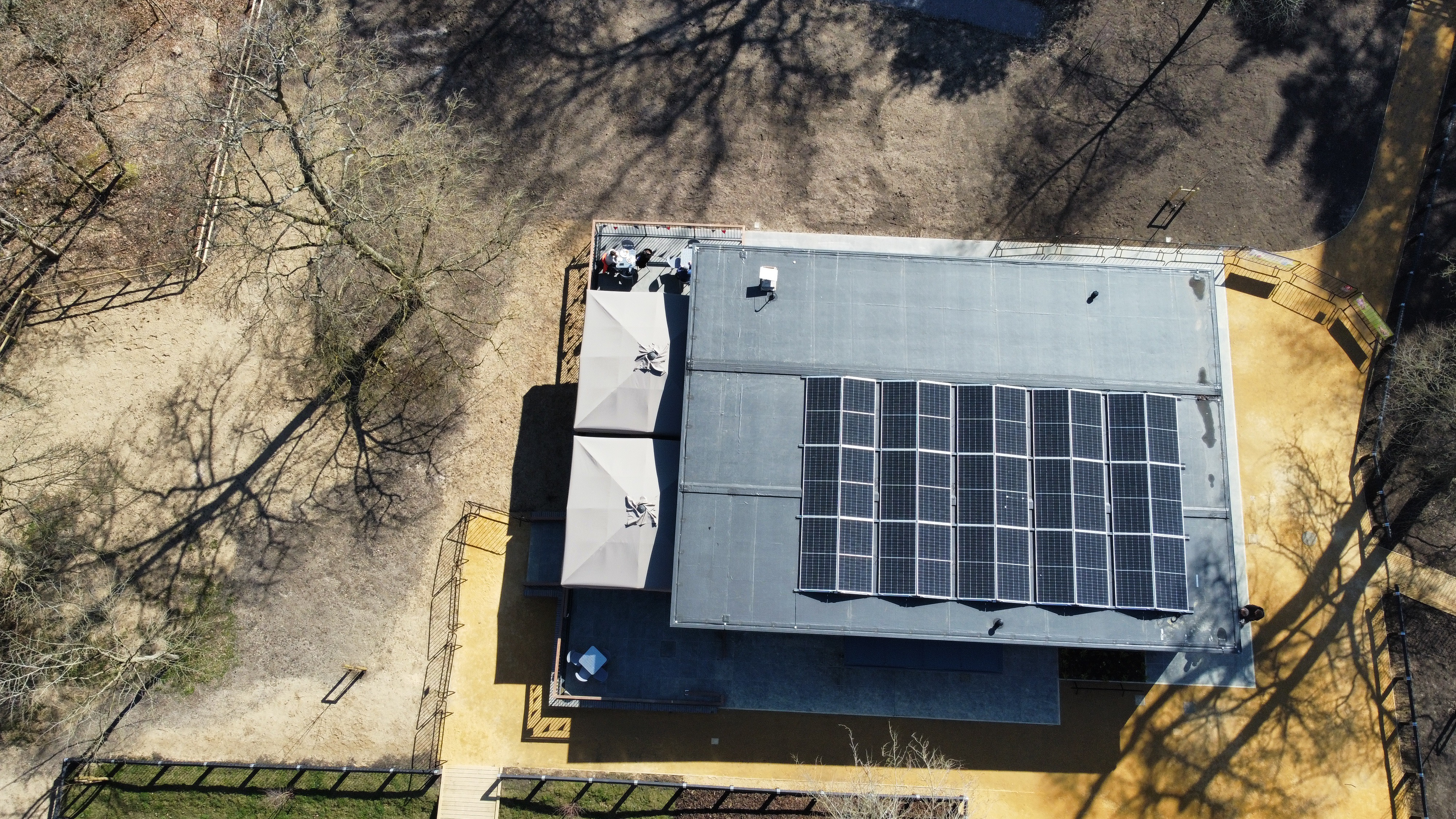
Greencap Energy solar array completed in 2025

Black Park SSSI has heath, alder carr – both rare in the county – mixed and coniferous woodland and some areas of acid grassland. It has a varied fauna, and insects include the nationally rare Roesel's bush cricket. There are eighteen species of butterfly, birds including hobbies and nightjars, and snakes and lizards.

== Filming location ==
Black Park is adjacent to Pinewood Film Studios and has been used as an outdoor location for many film and television productions.

The woods and lake featured prominently in the Hammer horror films from the late 1950s to the 1970s, including: The Curse of Frankenstein (1957), The Brides of Dracula (1960), The Curse of the Werewolf (1961), Dracula Prince of Darkness (1966) and Taste the Blood of Dracula (1970). In these films the location was often used to represent Transylvania. The park has also been used in the James Bond films Goldfinger (1964), where it was used for a night car chase (actually set in Switzerland and featuring Bond's Aston Martin DB5), and Casino Royale (2006). Other films featuring Black Park include Never Take Sweets from a Stranger (1960), several Carry On films, Fahrenheit 451 (1966), the Monty Python film And Now for Something Completely Different (1971), Bugsy Malone (1976), Wombling Free (1977), Hawk the Slayer (1980), Batman (1989), Sleepy Hollow (1999), the Harry Potter film series, Eden Lake (2008), Robin Hood (2010), Captain America: The First Avenger (2011), 47 Ronin (2013), Cinderella (2015), The Death of Stalin (2017), Star Wars: The Rise of Skywalker (2019), Jurassic World Dominion (2022) and Deadpool & Wolverine (2024).

For television, Black Park, together with its lake, was used extensively in location filming for the Doctor Who stories Full Circle (1980), State of Decay (1980) and The Visitation (1982). Dressed with fake cobwebs, it was also used for the early Blake's 7 episode 'The Web' (1978). Prior to these, in 1974 it depicted the planet Retha in The Full Circle, an episode in the first series of Space 1999. Recently, it used in the Star Wars series Andor.

== Recreation and sports ==
Black Park is popular with walkers and dog owners due to the wide open spaces and well-maintained routes. During summer 2010 a 'Go-Ape' activity centre was established in the park with the construction of climbing rigging and zip lines between the trees. The area is properly supervised by park staff during opening hours. The Go Ape team now offers cycle hire and Go Ape Nets, allowing even younger visitors a chance to climb high into the treetops.

Runners are commonplace within the park and the increase in private persons using the park for exercise/training has led to the establishment of a Parkrun event on Saturday mornings. The professionally organised events are free to enter and form part of a network of nationwide parkruns.

Mountain biking is popular in the park as the combination of dense woodland, open plains, technical sections and narrow but quick draining trails make for exciting riding.

The lake is open for fishing during the normal rod licence season, though pre-baiting, keep nets and night fishing are all forbidden. The park sells day tickets and annual permits at appropriate times of year.

== Black Park at war ==
During both World War One and Two the Park saw service for the Empire with troops from the Canadian Forestry Regiment helping to farm the Park and harvest the wood, for use in the trenches of France and building air strips in France for the Royal Flying Corps. To this day the lines of trees they planted can still be clearly seen.

One member of the Forestry Regiment, killed in a road traffic accident on nearby Crooked Billet Roundabout, is buried in the nearby St Margaret's Church, Iver Heath. Since 2007 the local Scout Group, 1st Iver Heath, have laid poppies on his grave, as part of the Centenary of Scouting and an event called 'Uniform Day 007' that featured a representative of the Canadian Army who helped the Scouts' routine of laying a wreath.

On the fields between the park and Iver Heath near Pinewood Studios, a World War One fighter crashed on its way to France after stopping off in Iver Heath. In World War Two a V2 rocket fell very close by the site of the fighter's location.

The Park was also used to store military supplies hidden amongst the trees from enemy surveillance, as was nearby Langley Park.

== Geology ==
The park is the type site for Black Park Gravel Member, a layer of sand and gravel dating to the Anglian ice age, around 450,000 years ago.
