= Covert War =

- The Americans episode
- Episode no.: Season 1 Episode 11
- Directed by: Nicole Kassell
- Written by: Joshua Brand; Melissa James Gibson
- Production code: BDU110
- Original air date: April 17, 2013
- Running time: 41 minutes

Guest appearances
- Richard Thomas as Frank Gaad; Annet Mahendru as Nina; Susan Misner as Sandra Beeman; Alison Wright as Martha Hanson; Lev Gorn as Arkady Ivanovich; Olek Krupa as General Zhukov; Paul Fitzgerald as Richard Patterson; Betsy Aidem as Miss Kendall; Richard Kline as Bill Hanson; Peggy Scott as Elaine Hanson; Margo Martindale as Claudia; Daniel Flaherty as Matthew Beeman; Joris Stuyck as Dmitri

Episode chronology
← Previous "Only You"	Next → "The Oath"
- The Americans season 1

"Covert War" is the eleventh episode of the first season of the period drama television series The Americans. It originally aired on FX in the United States on April 17, 2013.

== Plot ==
FBI agent Frank Gaad (Richard Thomas) announces to his subordinates that three high-ranking KGB officers are being targeted in revenge for the death of agent Amador, including General Zhukov (Olek Krupa), who is murdered shortly thereafter.

KGB agent Elizabeth Jennings (Keri Russell) and her neighbor Sandra Beeman (Susan Misner), the wife of FBI agent Stan (Noah Emmerich), go out dancing. They discuss their love lives, with Sandra confiding about the only other man she slept with besides Stan. Philip (Matthew Rhys) has the children visiting him in the motel room where he stays due to his separation from his wife Elizabeth. Later, Sandra confronts her husband about his whereabouts and tells him that she called the FBI, and they told her he finished work hours ago, which he denies.

Claudia (Margo Martindale) informs Elizabeth of Zhukov's death. This hurts Elizabeth, who demands that the man responsible—CIA Director of Planning for the Soviet Union Richard Patterson (Paul Fitzgerald)—be killed. Claudia disagrees, telling Elizabeth that those are not her orders, and that she always follows orders, unlike Elizabeth, whom she chastises for having disregarded instructions by letting Gregory commit suicide by cop. In a flashback to 1964, Zhukov and Elizabeth discuss her relationship with Philip.

Elizabeth tells Philip about Zhukov's death, stating that she is going to kill the man responsible, despite orders. Philip tries to talk her out of it, but she finds all the information she can on Patterson—that he is a womanizer and she can seduce him. Meanwhile, Stan is surprised to see his son, Matthew (Daniel Flaherty), return from The Rocky Horror Picture Show wearing makeup; Matthew reassures him that this does not make him gay.

Nina (Annet Mahendru) has been promoted at The Embassy and has received a new office. Arkady (Lev Gorn) tells her about the bug planted in Caspar Weinberger's study. Meanwhile, FBI employee Martha (Alison Wright) has decided to introduce Philip (disguised as FBI counterintelligence agent Clark) to her parents (Richard Kline and Peggy Scott). After an awkward meeting, Philip leaves abruptly but compliments Martha's parents. In another flashback—this time to 1970 in Geneva—Elizabeth confides in Zhukov that she is pregnant with her second child, but has not yet told Philip.

Philip and Elizabeth devise a plan to kidnap Patterson. Elizabeth, in disguise, meets Patterson in a bar, seducing him and bringing him into the bathroom for sex. While they are undressing, Elizabeth tries to inject him with a syringe, but he notices this and fights back. Elizabeth knocks him out in their ensuing fight and she and Philip drag him out of the bathroom window. At their safe house, Nina continues to question Stan about the murder of young KGB official Vlad. But Stan (who shot Vlad) tells her that they may never know who killed him.

In an abandoned warehouse, Elizabeth interrogates Patterson about murdering innocent people. Patterson responds that Zhukov was not innocent. He asks if she loves or cares about anyone, which upsets Elizabeth, who breaks down into tears and leaves the room. Philip comforts her and they decide to let Patterson go. The next day, Stan, Gaad and several FBI agents discuss the kidnapping with Patterson, where he identifies his captors as a couple. In a final flashback to Rome in 1976, Elizabeth tells Zhukov that nothing has changed between her and Philip.

Elizabeth visits Philip in his motel room and thanks him for his support. Philip is packing his clothes, telling her that the kids should not have to visit him in a motel. Elizabeth believes Philip is coming back to their house, which she wants, but he tells her that he plans to rent an apartment. Elizabeth is upset and leaves abruptly. Elizabeth meets Claudia and asks why she told her Patterson's identity, knowing that she would go after him. Claudia tells her that Zhukov was her lover, but Elizabeth does not believe this and thinks that Claudia set her up in an attempt to get her sent back to Moscow. Elizabeth threatens Claudia that "This isn't going to go well for you, old lady."

== Production ==
=== Development ===
In March 2013, FX confirmed that the eleventh episode of the series would be titled "Covert War", and that it would be written by Joshua Brand and Melissa James Gibson, and directed by Nicole Kassell. This was Brand's third writing credit, Gibson's second writing credit, and Kassell's first directing credit.

== Reception ==
=== Viewers ===
In its original American broadcast, "Covert War" was seen by an estimated 1.81 million household viewers with a 0.6 in the 18–49 demographics. This means that 0.6 percent of all households with televisions watched the episode. This was a 20% increase in viewership from the previous episode, which was watched by 1.50 million household viewers with a 0.6 in the 18–49 demographics.

=== Critical reviews ===
"Covert War" received generally positive reviews from critics. Eric Goldman of IGN gave the episode a "great" 8.8 out of 10 and wrote, "In the midst of more of this great character drama, I continue to admire The Americans for being so evenhanded in how skilled and tough these characters are. While he couldn't ultimately beat the younger man, Zhukov wasn't just an easy target and fought back first when the assassin came calling. And Peterson also turned out to be quite a struggle for Elizabeth, in an exciting seduction turned fight scene inside a bar bathroom."

Emily St. James of The A.V. Club gave the episode a "B" grade and wrote, "'Covert War' is, in many ways, an episode designed to move pieces around and get the characters into place for the final two episodes of the season. I don't know if I quite buy all of the moves, but that's natural at this point in a season of a serialized drama. I admire the attempt to give Elizabeth her own character showpiece, like the one that Philip got in 'Duty And Honor,' or the one that Stan got in 'Safe House,' but I'm not sure that it managed the trick of making me understand both her increasingly complicated motivations and who she was in the past."

Alan Sepinwall of HitFix wrote, "In what's been a pretty spectacular debut season for The Americans, some elements here and there have been shaky, but 'Covert War' was the first episode that didn't work for me overall, even as I enjoyed a lot of individual components of it." Matt Zoller Seitz of Vulture gave the episode a 4 star rating out of 5 and wrote, "Over four consecutive weeks, The Americans has killed off Stan's partner Chris Amador, Elizabeth's ex-lover and sometime espionage partner Gregory, and Nina's office mate and puppy dog crush nurturer Vlad. The body count continues in this week's 'Covert War,' which whacked Elizabeth’s mentor and sorta father-figure General Zhukov."

James Donaghy of The Guardian wrote, "Stan is as hopeless when faced with a beautiful woman as Patterson is. He keeps on denying knowledge of Vlad's murder, but Nina remains suspicious. She's taking it personally – there's a lot of that about. She now has higher clearance at the rezidentura, and may end up finding out herself that it was Stan who iced Vlad. At the very least that's going to make those booty calls awkward." Carla Day of TV Fanatic gave the episode a 4.8 star rating out of 5 and wrote, "'Covert War' was on the face about the escalation of the violence between America and the Soviet Union during the Cold War, but really it was about the personal cost that affected those on both sides of the war. No one was safe from suffering the emotional strain of their job, regardless of if they were American, Soviet, or living a life in-between."
