= Pilot (The Americans) =

- The Americans episode
- Episode no.: Season 1 Episode 1
- Directed by: Gavin O'Connor
- Written by: Joe Weisberg
- Production code: BDU179
- Original air date: January 30, 2013
- Running time: 69 minutes

Guest appearances
- Richard Thomas as Frank Gaad; Olek Krupa as General Viktor Zhukov; Susan Misner as Sandra Beeman; Cotter Smith as Deputy Attorney General Warren; Alison Wright as Martha Hanson; Daniel Flaherty as Matthew Beeman; David Vadim as Nikolai Timoshev; Michael Gaston as Mark Bartholomew; Joe Urla as David R. Sepsill; Chase Coleman as Rob; Kevin McCormick as Errol

Episode chronology
← Previous —	Next → "The Clock"
- The Americans season 1

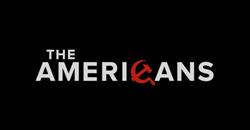
The Americans series logo

"Pilot" is the first episode of the first season of the period drama television series The Americans. It originally aired on FX in the United States on January 30, 2013. The episode was written by series creator Joe Weisberg and directed by Gavin O'Connor.

In 1981, shortly after the inauguration of President Ronald Reagan, Philip and Elizabeth Jennings (Matthew Rhys and Keri Russell) are undercover Soviet intelligence agents from the secretive Directorate S of the KGB sent to the U.S. 15 years ago to work deep cover in Washington, D.C. Their assumed identities are a married couple who run a travel agency, and even their own children Paige (Holly Taylor) and Henry (Keidrich Sellati) do not know their secret.

Reviews for the episode were largely positive. Critics commented on the lead performances of Russell, Rhys, and Noah Emmerich. In the United States, the series premiere achieved a viewership of 3.22 million.

== Plot ==
In a cocktail bar, Elizabeth Jennings (Keri Russell), a KGB Illegal agent disguised as a sex worker, talks to an FBI bureaucrat. She takes him to a hotel room where she seduces him for information. Subsequently, Nikolai Timoshev (David Vadim), a KGB operative who has defected to the United States, is being watched by Philip Jennings (Matthew Rhys), Elizabeth's husband, and Rob (Chase Coleman). They stand in an alley waiting for Timoshev. As Timoshev approaches them, he realizes it is a setup and he runs, with Philip and Rob in pursuit. Philip captures him, but not before Rob is stabbed by Timoshev. Elizabeth picks the three of them up in a car and they drop Rob off at a nearby hospital, but miss the ship that would have returned Timoshev to Russia.

At the FBI headquarters in Washington, D.C., Stan Beeman (Noah Emmerich) meets his new counter-intelligence partner, Chris Amador (Maximiliano Hernández). Their supervisor, Agent Mark Bartholomew (Michael Gaston), informs them that Timoshev failed to arrive. Meanwhile, Philip hides Timoshev in the trunk of his car in his garage, tied up and gagged. Philip threatens to kill him if he makes any noise. Philip then leaves the garage and goes into his home where Elizabeth and their two children, Paige (Holly Taylor) and Henry (Keidrich Sellati), get ready for school. In a flashback, a young Elizabeth is practicing fighting moves with her trainer. Timoshev takes over from the trainer. He and Elizabeth start to practice. Timoshev gets aggressive and eventually rapes her. Back in the present day, Philip, in disguise, meets with Martha Hanson (Alison Wright), a woman who works in Agent Bartholomew's office. Philip probes her for information on Timoshev, to which she reveals that the FBI have the car description and license plate number used for the kidnapping and that it was carried out by two men and a woman. Later, Philip tells Elizabeth everything the FBI have on them.

The Jenningses go next door to meet their new neighbors, who happen to be Stan and his family. Stan tells them that he works in counter-intelligence. Later, debating whether or not Stan moving next door is a coincidence, Elizabeth tells Philip that they have to get rid of Timoshev as soon as they can. Philip disagrees, and during their argument he suggests they defect to America by giving Timoshev to the FBI. Elizabeth immediately rejects this idea.

In another flashback, Philip and Elizabeth are introduced for the first time and are given their orders. In the present day, Philip, while jogging, calls the hospital where Rob was dropped off. He is informed that he died. Later, Stan asks Philip to lend him jumper cables. Philip takes him to his garage and Stan notices the Jennings' car is the same type used in the kidnapping, albeit with Virginia license plates.

Later, Philip removes Timoshev from the trunk of the car in order to take him to Stan. Elizabeth attacks Timoshev, attempting to kill him despite his apology for hurting her. Philip asks how he hurt her and when neither of them replies, he kills Timoshev by crushing his throat.

Philip and Elizabeth put Timoshev's body into their car, drive to an abandoned factory where they pour acid on his body and dump his remains in a wastewater pool. They then have sex in their car. Philip (in disguise) visits the man who came on to his daughter in a shoe shop earlier, and almost kills him with a barbecue grill, leaving him with a warning. The next day, Elizabeth goes to see General Viktor Zhukov (Olek Krupa), who questions her about the failed mission. When Zhukov asks for an update on Philip's loyalty, based on Elizabeth's earlier reports, she dismisses them, covering for Philip and taking responsibility for the mission's failure. In a final flashback, Philip and Elizabeth have just moved to the States. Philip tries to get close to her, but she rejects him, saying that she isn't ready.

In the final scene, Stan breaks into the Jennings' garage and checks their trunk. Finding nothing, he leaves. Philip hides nearby with a silenced firearm in his hands.

== Production ==
Filming began for the first season in November 2012 in the New York City area. The production used location shots to simulate a dramatic setting of Washington, D.C. Early filming was delayed by flooding caused by Hurricane Sandy.

=== Conception ===
"The most interesting thing I observed during my time at the CIA was the family life of agents who served abroad with kids and spouses. The reality is that mostly they’re just people going about their lives. The job is one element, and trying to depict the issues they face just seemed like something that, if we could bring it to television in a realistic way, would be new."

— Joe Weisberg, creator and showrunner of The Americans

The Americans was created by Joe Weisberg, a former CIA officer. Despite its spy setting, Weisberg sought out to tell the story about a marriage. "The Americans is at its core a marriage story. International relations is just an allegory for the human relations. Sometimes, when you’re struggling in your marriage or with your kid, it feels like life or death. For Philip and Elizabeth, it often is." Executive producer Joel Fields described the series as working different levels of reality: the fictional world of the marriage between Philip and Elizabeth, and the real world involving the characters' experiences during the Cold War.

Working at the CIA, which Weisberg later described as a mistake, has helped develop several storylines in the series, basing some plot lines on real-life stories, and integrating several things he learned in his training, such as dead drops and communication protocols. Weisberg was fascinated by stories he had heard from agents who served abroad as spies, while raising their families. He was interested in bringing that concept to television, with the idea of a family of spies, rather than just one person.

Weisberg was partially influenced by the events of the Illegals Program to write a pilot script for the series. Weisberg's research material included notes on the KGB's Cold War left by Vasili Mitrokhin and conversations with some of his former colleagues at the CIA. He said that, unlike the circumstances involving the 2010 Russian spy ring, he had opted to set the story in the early 1980s because "a modern day [setting] didn't seem like a good idea", adding, "People were both shocked and simultaneously shrugged at the [2010] scandal because it didn't seem like we were really enemies with Russia anymore. An obvious way to remedy that for television was to stick it back in the Cold War. At first, the '70s appealed to me just because I loved the hair and the music. But can you think of a better time than the '80s with Ronald Reagan yelling about the evil empire?"

=== Development ===
After reading Weisberg's novel, An Ordinary Spy, executive producer Graham Yost discovered that Weisberg had also written a pilot for a possible spy series. Yost read the pilot and discovered that it was "annoyingly good", which led to the beginning of motions to develop the show. Shooting of the pilot began in May 2012 and lasted until mid-June. Filming began for the first season in November 2012 in the New York City area. The production used location shots to simulate a dramatic setting of Washington, D.C. Early filming was delayed by flooding caused by Hurricane Sandy.

=== Casting ===
Former Felicity star Russell spoke about the decision to work on another television series: "I thought the pilot script was just so interesting. It was so far from a procedural. And [originally,] I didn't know that I wanted to do it. I always say no to everything. I never want to do anything. [Laughs.] But I just couldn't stop thinking about it. I read it...and I kept trying to figure it out, because it's so not clear. It's still not clear to me. But there's so many different levels to it."

Rhys spoke about what attracted him to the role of Philip: "He's a sort of gift of a part in that he's very sort of layered and multi-faceted. And when you meet him, he's at this great turning point in his life where everything's changing for him. You just get to do everything. You get to do the kung fu, and you get to do the emotional scenes, you get to do the disguises. It's the full package for an actor. It's a dream."

Emmerich was initially hesitant about taking a role in the series. He explained: "The truth is, from the very beginning, I thought, "I don't want to do a TV show where I carry a gun or a badge. I'm done with guns and badges. I just don't want to do that anymore." When I first read it I thought, "Yeah, it's really interesting and really good, but I don't want to be an FBI guy." His friend, Gavin O'Connor, who directed the episode, convinced him to take a closer look at the role. Emmerich stated that he responded to the aspect of marriage and family. "It was really interesting, and it was really intelligent and unusual, and it stood out from the pack."

== Reception ==
=== Ratings ===
In its original American broadcast, "Pilot" was seen by an estimated 3.22 million household viewers and gained a 1.2 ratings share among adults aged 18–49, according to Nielsen Media Research.

=== Reviews ===
The episode received largely positive reviews from critics. On the review aggregator website Metacritic, "Pilot" scored 77 out of 100 based on 35 reviews. Many critics commended the plot and performance of the leads. Rob Brunner of Entertainment Weekly described it as "an absorbing spy thriller" while David Hinkley of the New York Daily News praised the pace, noting that "It's a premise that requires as much clever dramatic footwork as you might expect, and creator Joe Weisberg, a former CIA agent, handles the challenge". Verne Gay of Newsday called it a "smart newcomer with a pair of leads that turns The Americans into a likely winner" and gave it a grade of an A−.

Gail Pennington, television critic for the St. Louis Post-Dispatch gave The Americans a rating of three out of four stars. In her review of the debut episode, Pennington stated "The Americans isn't just a heart-pounding action drama; by presenting heroes that are also villains, it also confronts viewers with TV's deepest moral dilemma since The Sopranos". Said Glenn Garvin of The Miami Herald about the lead characters: "If the Russians had agents this convincing the Cold War might have turned out differently".

A few reviewers had criticisms for the series. Hank Stuever of The Washington Post observed that "The Americans struggles to crack a certain code; the concept is tantalizing, but the follow-through lacks the momentum that gets viewers to commit". He described it, however, as "another well-made, provocative TV drama" and suggested that it "could benefit from having the finite boundaries of being a miniseries rather than launching itself into the ambitious realm of an ongoing series."
