= Gregory (The Americans) =

- The Americans episode
- Episode no.: Season 1 Episode 3
- Directed by: Thomas Schlamme
- Written by: Joel Fields
- Production code: BDU102
- Original air date: February 13, 2013
- Running time: 45 minutes

Guest appearances
- Derek Luke as Gregory Thomas; Richard Thomas as Frank Gaad; Annet Mahendru as Nina; Cotter Smith as Deputy Attorney General; Margo Martindale as Claudia; Anthony Arkin as Stavos; Audrey Esparza as Joyce Ramirez

Episode chronology
← Previous "The Clock"	Next → "In Control"
- The Americans season 1

"Gregory" is the third episode of the first season of the American period drama television series The Americans. It originally aired on FX in the United States on February 13, 2013.

== Plot ==
In the opening scene, Philip Jennings (Matthew Rhys) and Stan Beeman (Noah Emmerich) play a game of racquetball. Stan explains that the game is about making your opponent move too fast in order to make a mistake. Stan is paged by Nina (Annet Mahendru) and meets up with her. She informs him about Rob (Chase Coleman), the agent who worked with Philip and Elizabeth (Keri Russell) in their kidnapping of Timoshev, and who was killed. The FBI send a picture of Rob to DMVs across the country and discover he has a wife and a newborn son living in Philadelphia.

Philip and Elizabeth receive a hidden message in the classifieds section of a newspaper about Rob arranging a meet in Philadelphia. Philip suggests that Gregory Thomas (Derek Luke), a former black militant whom Elizabeth recruited, should go to the meet. Elizabeth meets Gregory in his apartment, where he makes a pass at her, but she rejects him, telling him that she is committed to Philip. Gregory agrees to go to the meet and confesses his love for Elizabeth.

Gregory stations several of his men hiding in plain sight to watch over the meet. Gregory notices a woman with a baby sitting on a bench and sees that the FBI are tailing her. The woman is revealed to be Joyce Ramirez (Audrey Esparza), Rob's widow. Using his men to trip up the tailing FBI, Gregory gets Joyce away from their surveillance and brings her to a safe house, along with Philip and Elizabeth. Joyce does not know that Rob was a KGB agent and believed he was a drug dealer. Joyce gives Philip the note and, using a liquid solution, Philip finds a name and number. Gregory probes Philip about his feelings for Elizabeth, revealing that they had a relationship, even when Elizabeth was pregnant with Paige (Holly Taylor). Philip ignores this.

Gregory suggests they kill Joyce before their cover is blown, but Philip threatens Gregory's life if he harms her. Philip goes for a walk and meets his and Elizabeth's new KGB supervisor, Claudia (Margo Martindale), who tells him that the Americans are working on some sort of technology that would put the Soviets' nuclear arsenal at risk. She tells him to make contact with the person mentioned in Rob's note. Philip confronts Elizabeth about her affair with Gregory, telling her that he would not lie about their relationship. He then goes to meet Rob's contact in a warehouse basement. He is brought into a room with two guards and Rob's contact. Philip takes out the guards after they refuse to stay out of his blind spot. Philip is cut by one of the guards, but ignores it. Rob's contact hands him a briefcase with classified schematics for a nuclear X-ray laser anti-ballistic missile ray.

Stan and Amador retrace their steps to see how Joyce escaped. Stan notices one of Gregory's men watching them and he and Amador chase him, but he disappears. Stan wonders, "Why does some guy in the hood care about a KGB spy?"

Joyce begins to fear for her life when she realizes that Philip, Elizabeth, and Gregory are spies. Elizabeth assures her that they will not kill her. Later, they take Joyce and her child and hand them over to Claudia, where she tells Joyce they are sending her to Cuba. The next morning, Elizabeth reveals to Philip the extent of her relationship with Gregory—that she fell in love with him when she saw how dedicated he was to their cause. Elizabeth tells Philip that while she did not fall in love with him when they first met, she feels she is falling in love with him now.

In Donetsk, Russia, Rob and Joyce's child is brought to Rob's parents. Stan finds Joyce's dead body in a car, staged to look like an accidental heroin overdose.

== Production ==
The episode was written by Joel Fields and directed by Thomas Schlamme. Joe Weisberg, the series creator, originally came up with a list of agents whom the characters of Philip and Elizabeth have recruited or could recruit later in the series, with one of the more compelling agents being Gregory, whom Elizabeth recruited right after arriving in America in the mid-1960s. As Fields was writing the episode, he expanded upon Weisberg's idea to include a romantic relationship between Elizabeth and Gregory: "This woman, who had been unable to be honest with her husband, could be honest with this man that she had recruited. It became a way for her character to be humanized and softened, and that evolved." Fields considers "Gregory" as one of his favorites from the first season: "Tommy Schlamme directed that episode. Very powerful."

== Reception ==
In its original American broadcast on February 13, 2013, "Gregory" was watched by 1.65 million viewers, according to Nielsen ratings.

The A.V. Club gave the episode a B+, commenting "'Gregory' was a little slower moving and less viscerally exciting than the first two episodes, but I really liked it all the same." Alan Sepinwall, TV critic for HitFix, commended the episode, stating that it was best episode out of the first three episodes: "[T]he way "Gregory" dealt with the complicated questions of the Jennings marriage—and their ongoing mission in America—really impressed me. I was already confident in "The Americans" based on the first two installments, but this one has sealed the deal." Matt Zoller Seitz, reviewing for Vulture, declared "Gregory" as the best episode of season 1, with the episode "Only You", which also features Gregory, as the second best. He stated that "Gregory" is "a marvel: expertly paced, with a marvelous control of tone, strong performances, and a number of unexpectedly piercing scenes", while also validating his thought about how "The Americans isn't mainly about espionage, just as The Sopranos wasn't mainly about the mob."
