= In Control (The Americans) =

- The Americans episode
- Episode no.: Season 1 Episode 4
- Directed by: Jean de Segonzac
- Written by: Joel Fields; Joe Weisberg
- Production code: BDU103
- Original air date: February 20, 2013
- Running time: 42 minutes

Guest appearances
- Richard Thomas as Frank Gaad; Annet Mahendru as Nina; Susan Misner as Sandra Beeman; Reg Rogers as Charles Duluth; Peter Von Berg as Vasili Nikolaevich; Margo Martindale as Claudia; Daniel Flaherty as Matthew Beeman; Alison Wright as Martha Hanson; Johanna Day as Dana Simon; Leif Riddell as Agent Peters; David Adkins as George

Episode chronology
← Previous "Gregory"	Next → "COMINT"
- The Americans season 1

"In Control" is the fourth episode of the first season of the period drama television series The Americans. It originally aired on FX in the United States on February 20, 2013.

== Plot ==
After spending the afternoon in a hotel room together, KGB agents Philip and Elizabeth Jennings see a news report about the attempted assassination of Ronald Reagan on a television in the hotel lobby. FBI agents Stan Beeman and Chris Amador are practicing speaking Russian when they hear the news. Agent Frank Gaad tells Stan that he needs to find out if the assassin John Hinckley Jr. is working with the KGB, and tells him to meet with his informant Nina.

James Brady is falsely declared dead by several news broadcasters as Elizabeth is told by her KGB handler Claudia to prepare for Operation Christopher, which involves Russian agents engaging in guerrilla warfare in the event of a coup. Claudia tells Elizabeth that she does not believe the KGB were behind the shooting.

Stan calls Nina, demanding to meet with her. She tells KGB Resident Vasili Nikolaievich that she should go to a local bar to hear what congressional aides are saying—he lets her go but has her followed. Stan notices this as they are about to meet, and walks past her. They meet later and Nina tells him that the opinion at the Embassy is that Alexander Haig is staging a coup.

Philip hears from a nurse who treated Reagan in the hospital that he is expected to survive. They inform the Centre but are still told to map out targets. Philip and Elizabeth stake out Caspar Weinberger's house, but are interrupted by a security officer patrolling the streets. Elizabeth kills the officer after he tells her that he needs to run a police check on the van they are using. They listen to a recording from Weinberger's office, where they learn Haig may have the codes for the U.S.'s nuclear missiles. Philip suggests they wait to confirm the information, but Elizabeth says they need to report it to the Centre. Philip tells her that this could cause a catastrophic panic and that her commitment to the mission is blinding her judgment.

Philip and Elizabeth find out from Stan that Hinckley is mentally unbalanced and has nothing to do with the KGB. Philip sends this information to Moscow. Later, Elizabeth apologizes for not listening to him. Philip fears that Moscow will find out that they withheld the questionable information about Haig having the nuclear football and they agree to keep it a secret.

== Production ==
=== Development ===
In February 2013, FX confirmed that the fourth episode of the series would be titled "In Control", and that it would be written by executive producer Joel Fields and series creator Joe Weisberg, and directed by Jean de Segonzac. This was de Segonzac's first directing credit.

== Reception ==
=== Viewers ===
In its original American broadcast, "In Control" was seen by an estimated 1.91 million household viewers with a 0.8 in the 18–49 demographics. This means that 0.8 percent of all households with televisions watched the episode. This was a 15 percent increase in viewership from the previous episode, which was watched by 1.65 million household viewers with a 0.7 in the 18–49 demographics.

=== Critical reviews ===
"In Control" received positive reviews from critics. Eric Goldman of IGN gave the episode a "great" 8.8 out of 10 and wrote, "This was a notable episode of The Americans, involving the first big real life 'event' the show has used, as Elizabeth and Philip found everything in turmoil in the wake of the assassination attempt on President Reagan. In the process, 'In Control' managed to once more skillfully blend the Jennings' spy life and marital life into one highly dramatic mixture."

Emily St. James of The A.V. Club gave the episode a B+ grade and wrote, "Maybe my favorite thing about the show right now is the way that it's loading in these little grace notes around the edges of scenes. Elizabeth pretending to have been broken up about the Kennedy assassination. Philip crouching in the woods beside his transmitter, sending coded messages to Moscow. The couple having to scramble to get out of a tight spot when they’re caught outside of the Defense Secretary's house. All of these things make the show feel lived-in [...] and that's one of the reasons it's become so compelling, so quickly."

Alan Sepinwall of HitFix wrote, "Another really strong outing, and one that managed to still examine the state of the Jennings marriage – and the Beeman marriage, for that matter – in the midst of all the chaos." Matt Zoller Seitz of Vulture gave the episode a 4-star rating out of 5 and wrote, "The Americans is shaping up to be as historically conscious a drama as Mad Men, with actual events driving and transforming the characters' lives. But the interaction between fact and fiction seemed awkward, at times inorganic. I believe that the stress over the shootings and the possibility of a 'coup' would dredge up Philip and Elizabeth's American-dream-versus-Russian-loyalty issues, but I didn't like how the episode handled it."

Jarrett Kruse of Den of Geek wrote, "What wowed me the most was that The Americans is able to implement things from previous episodes as counter measures to the possibility of World War III. This is not just a stand-alone episode; The Americans has quietly been waiting for something of this magnitude to happen on their watch. The allusions made in previous episodes are important things to remember in this type of series. Storylines that you think are dormant boomerang back unexpectedly, much to the viewer's delight." Carla Day of TV Fanatic gave the episode a 4.8-star rating out of 5 and wrote, "The Americans has been exceptional in this way. The end of the war may be known, but the ride along the way is full of tension and victories by both sides."
