= Duty and Honor =

- The Americans episode
- Episode no.: Season 1 Episode 7
- Directed by: Alex Chapple
- Written by: Joshua Brand
- Production code: BDU106
- Original air date: March 13, 2013
- Running time: 40 minutes

Guest appearances
- Richard Thomas as Frank Gaad; Annet Mahendru as Nina; Susan Misner as Sandra Beeman; Reg Rogers as Charles Duluth; Tim Hopper as Sanford Prince; Margo Martindale as Claudia; Daniel Flaherty as Matthew Beeman; Marina Squerciati as Irina; Andrzej Krukowski as Andrzej Bielawski; Tom Riis Farrell as Jerry Clancy; Lou Martini Jr. as Ray Fucci

Episode chronology
| ← Previous "Trust Me" | Next → "Mutually Assured Destruction" |
- The Americans season 1

"Duty and Honor" is the seventh episode of the first season of the period drama television series The Americans. It originally aired on FX in the United States on March 13, 2013. This episode features Andrzej Bielawski's character who is loosely based on Jerzy Popiełuszko, a Polish Catholic priest and dissident who became associated with Solidarity.

== Plot ==
Philip Jennings (Matthew Rhys) is sent to New York City to discredit a Polish dissident. He meets up with Irina Semenova (Marina Squerciati), a former lover whom he knew back in Russia. They attend a travel agent convention where Irina poses as a travel agent from Montreal. Irina tells Philip that she has been waiting a long time to see him again. Irina is set to meet with Charles Duluth (Reg Rogers), a journalist and contact of Philip's, and Andrzej Bielawski, a Polish resistance leader who has been ordained a priest despite having a wife and children whom he has deserted to pursue his religious vocation. Irina pretends to be Polish.

The three of them go out to dinner. Shortly after, Charles leaves Irina and Andrzej alone. As they walk back to the hotel, Irina convinces Andrzej to let his guards hang back and give them more peace. Philip, dressed as a mugger, steals from them and the guards give chase. Later at the hotel, Irina drugs Andrzej. Philip apologizes to Irina for hurting her during the mugging. She tells him that he fathered a child with her, who is now 18 years old. Irina tells Philip that she wants to start a new life with him, before Philip beats her, giving her bruises on her face. Andrzej wakes up the next morning as a US official enters with photos of the beaten Irina, claiming that she was brutally beaten and raped by Andrzej.

Philip sleeps with Irina, and the same night receives a call from an apologetic Elizabeth (Keri Russell), who asks him to come home. Irina tells Philip that their son (Mischa Semenov) is in the army. Irina confides in Philip that she has grown tired of working with the KGB, believing that what they did to Andrzej was cruel. She wants to run away with Philip, but Philip believes she is lying to him about having a son together. Philip refuses to go with her, saying that he cannot leave his family.

While Philip is in New York, Elizabeth and the children are invited to dinner with the Beemans. Sandra (Susan Misner) informs Elizabeth that Stan (Noah Emmerich) is busy working. She confides in Elizabeth that her marriage with Stan isn't working, and that she is envious of Elizabeth and Philip for being able to work together professionally. Elizabeth remarks that marriage is hard and Sandra replies: "At the end of the day, you either choose to keep going or you don't."

Meanwhile, Stan and Chris Amador (Maximiliano Hernández) go out to a bar. Amador remarks that Stan is more comfortable at work than he is in his personal life. He suggests that Stan chat up a girl at the bar, but instead Stan meets up with Nina (Annet Mahendru). They have sex. Nina tells him that she will not blackmail him because of their liaison and that it does not have to happen again if he does not want it to.

Philip returns from New York, where Elizabeth tells him she wants to work on their marriage. She asks him if anything happened between him and Irina and he says no.

== Production ==
=== Development ===
In February 2013, FX confirmed that the seventh episode of the series would be titled "Duty and Honor", and that it would be written by Joshua Brand, and directed by Alex Chapple. This was Brand's first writing credit, Chapple's first directing credit.

== Reception ==
=== Viewers ===
In its original American broadcast, "Duty and Honor" was seen by an estimated 1.70 million household viewers with a 0.6 in the 18–49 demographics. This means that 0.6 percent of all households with televisions watched the episode. This was a 10% decrease in viewership from the previous episode, which was watched by 1.88 million household viewers with a 0.7 in the 18–49 demographics.

=== Critical reviews ===
"Duty and Honor" received extremely positive reviews from critics. Eric Goldman of IGN gave the episode a "great" 8 out of 10 and wrote, "Philip may have a son with Irina! That was a hell of a thing for him (and us!) to learn, though by the end of the episode, he was unsure whether it was the truth. I feel like it was though... But for now, Irina is gone, so that will be a question left for the future."

Emily St. James of The A.V. Club gave the episode an "A" grade and wrote, "'Duty And Honor' hit me almost directly where I live. There were two scenes that very nearly made me cry, and TV rarely provokes much of any emotional reaction in me at all. I've always thought the real strength of The Americans was that it embedded its admittedly nifty spy subplots into a fairly universal story about just how much work marriage could be, and if the series could seem like it's endlessly spinning its wheels in this regard, it hasn't seemed that way yet because this is just the simple truth."

Alan Sepinwall of HitFix wrote, "Those details may never come out, but it's a reminder that no matter what either party feels, or how hard they work at it, they're trying to patch together a structure built on a rotten foundation. Another great episode of what continues to be a sterling debut season." Matt Zoller Seitz of Vulture gave the episode a 4 star rating out of 5 and wrote, "More so than any episode since 'Gregory,' 'Duty and Honor' zeroes in on the barely healed fissures that exist in all relationships, even seemingly stable ones, and that sometimes crack under stress."

Vicky Frost of The Guardian wrote, "I slightly sigh at storylines like this: unforeseeable and previously unmentioned obstacles suddenly arriving at opportune moments to wreak havoc. It has largely been Philip who has tried to bring the Jennings' marriage alive to this point. Handy to have his beloved ex turn up just as he began to seriously doubt Elisabeth, leaving the two women competing for his affections." Carla Day of TV Fanatic gave the episode a 4.8 star rating out of 5 and wrote, "The Americans continues to impress with its tight storytelling, compelling characters, and ability to be unpredictable at the right times."
