= Mutually Assured Destruction (The Americans) =

- The Americans episode
- Episode no.: Season 1 Episode 8
- Directed by: Bill Johnson
- Written by: Joel Fields; Joe Weisberg
- Production code: BDU107
- Original air date: March 20, 2013
- Running time: 47 minutes

Guest appearances
- Richard Thomas as Frank Gaad; Annet Mahendru as Nina; Susan Misner as Sandra Beeman; Alison Wright as Martha Hanson; Lev Gorn as Arkady Ivanovich; Margo Martindale as Claudia; Daniel Flaherty as Matthew Beeman; Vitaly Benko as Vlad; Ryan Farrell as Agent Milbank; Sadie Sink as Lana; Peter Levine as Ruben Hollander; Mark Doherty as Agent Brenn; Shuler Hensley as Weapons Dealer; Chris Sullivan as Assassin

Episode chronology
← Previous "Duty and Honor"	Next → "Safe House"
- The Americans season 1

"Mutually Assured Destruction" is the eighth episode of the first season of the period drama television series The Americans. It originally aired on FX in the United States on March 20, 2013.

== Plot ==
Philip Jennings (Matthew Rhys) returns from a game of racquetball with Stan Beeman (Noah Emmerich), when Elizabeth (Keri Russell) informs him that they have a job – stopping a contract assassin who has been hired by the KGB to kill American scientists. The KGB changed their minds on the mission, but give Philip and Elizabeth no information on what he looks like or who he will kill first.

Philip and Elizabeth monitor the house of one of the scientists. They plant a bomb under his hood and kill the engine in the hope that he notices the bomb, which he does, and gets his wife to safety. Philip blows up the car, forcing the U.S. government to give the scientists protection. Elizabeth meets Claudia (Margo Martindale), where Claudia informs her that Philip did in fact sleep with Irina, despite Philip telling Elizabeth that nothing had happened between them.

At the FBI headquarters, Agent Gaad (Richard Thomas) has instructed the agents to find out who blew up the scientist's car. He gives Stan the keys to a safe house so that he and Nina (Annet Mahendru) can meet in private. Elizabeth, in disguise, goes to the contract killer's only US contact. Before she can interrogate him, his young daughter draws a shotgun on Elizabeth. Philip takes the gun from the girl and they find out that the contact sold explosives to the assassin, whom he describes as a "chubby", "friendly guy". He gives them pictures he took of the assassin when he visited his house.

After an awkward dinner at the Beemans', Philip asks Elizabeth why she is giving him the cold shoulder. She tells him that she knows he slept with Irina. Philip apologizes and asks for a second chance, but Elizabeth declines. Philip (as Clark) asks Martha (Alison Wright), Gaad's secretary, about Gaad and the FBI's knowledge of the bombing. Martha volunteers to find out what Gaad knows and later makes copies of secret files that Gaad gave to her, but is briefly interrupted by Chris Amador (Maximiliano Hernández), whom Martha used to briefly date and who asks her out. She declines and brings the files to Philip, citing suspicious foreign nationals that came to the US in the past week, with information on hotels in which they are staying.

Philip and Elizabeth go to the assassin's hotel room, with Philip kicking the door down and pulling a gun on him and Elizabeth entering through the window and doing the same. The assassin backs himself near the bathroom and signals to a bomb placed on the wall behind Philip. The assassin draws his gun and a gunfight ensues. As the assassin is attempting to detonate the bomb, Elizabeth tosses it into the bathroom where the assassin is hiding; he accidentally blows himself up.

An FBI agent shows up for his shift protecting a house accommodating one of the scientists. Before his death, the assassin had placed a bomb inside the FBI agent's walkie-talkie. Soon after, the house blows up, killing the scientist and three agents. After hearing the news on the phone, Gaad swears to his agents that those responsible will pay.

Philip and Elizabeth return home. He tries to apologize to her, but she does not accept it. He then tells her if she does not want to be married to him, The Centre would have no objection. On her return home, Amador watches Martha from his car.

== Production ==
=== Development ===
In February 2013, FX confirmed that the eighth episode of the series would be titled "Mutually Assured Destruction", and that it would be written by Joel Fields and Joe Weisberg, and directed by Bill Johnson. This was Fields' third writing credit, Weisberg's fourth writing credit, Johnson's first directing credit.

== Reception ==
=== Viewers ===
In its original American broadcast, "Mutually Assured Destruction" was seen by an estimated 1.65 million household viewers with a 0.6 in the 18–49 demographics. This means that 0.6 percent of all households with televisions watched the episode. This was a slight decrease in viewership from the previous episode, which was watched by 1.70 million household viewers with a 0.6 in the 18–49 demographics.

=== Critical reviews ===
"Mutually Assured Destruction" received generally positive reviews from critics. Emily St. James of The A.V. Club gave the episode a "B" grade and wrote, "After a really great string of episodes, 'Mutually Assured Destruction' takes a bit of a step back to set up some storylines that will surely be important in the season to come. Though not a bad episode, it definitely has a sense of marking time for the first time this season."

Alan Sepinwall of HitFix wrote, "'Mutually Assured Destruction' is far from a bad episode of The Americans, but it feels like one that will be better appreciated as part of the whole season rather than as a standalone hour airing in the week between 'Duty and Honor' and whatever's coming next week." Matt Zoller Seitz of Vulture gave the episode a 3 star rating out of 5 and wrote, "A divorce would be painful to watch, yet the aftermath could be fascinating. Divorced couples don't cease being couples; their couplehood just becomes more complex and thorny and painful, especially with kids involved. The Americans makes me miss being married. Which, given how much pain it depicts, is a pretty amazing achievement."

Vicky Frost of The Guardian wrote, "It feels rather like we're stuck in a mid-season rut here. Elizabeth and Philip blowing hot and cold non-stop, and sent off on missions that barely connect, the main story arch inching forward too slowly for my liking. Like the on-screen momentum, I fear I'm starting to flag." Carla Day of TV Fanatic gave the episode a 4.4 star rating out of 5 and wrote, "After a string of increasingly intense episodes, 'Mutually Assured Destruction' was rather subdued. While it was enjoyable, it didn't hold my attention as much as previous hours of The Americans. The hunt for the KGB-hired assassin felt more like a procedural investigation, rather than a high-stakes spy chase."
