= The Oath (The Americans) =

- The Americans episode
- Episode no.: Season 1 Episode 12
- Directed by: John Dahl
- Written by: Joshua Brand; Melissa James Gibson
- Production code: BDU111
- Original air date: April 24, 2013
- Running time: 42 minutes

Guest appearances
- Richard Thomas as Frank Gaad; Annet Mahendru as Nina; Alison Wright as Martha Hanson; Lev Gorn as Arkady Ivanovich; Tonye Patano as Viola Johnson; Cotter Smith as Deputy Attorney General; Tim Hopper as Sanford Prince; Meg Gibson as Mrs. Weinberger; Richard Kline as Bill Hanson; Peggy Scott as Elaine Hanson; Margo Martindale as Claudia; Daniel Flaherty as Matthew Beeman; Inna Beynishes as Sonya; Jill Shackner as Sarah; Daniel Bluestone as Harry; Matthew Gumley as Rich

Episode chronology
← Previous "Covert War"	Next → "The Colonel"
- The Americans season 1

"The Oath" is the twelfth episode of the first season of the period drama television series The Americans. It originally aired on FX in the United States on April 24, 2013.

== Plot ==
Sanford Prince (Tim Hopper) tells KGB agent Elizabeth Jennings (Keri Russell) that he has recruited an Air Force colonel named Lyle Rennhull who will give the Soviets important information on the SDI project for $50,000. Elizabeth brings this information to her husband Philip (Matthew Rhys), who is wary, citing Prince's gambling addiction. Elizabeth believes Prince is delivering them the "highest source" within the Reagan administration, while Philip believes it could be a trap.

Elizabeth receives material from Prince at a dead drop, containing schematics for the U.S. missile defense system. She meets Claudia (Margo Martindale) who believes that the Americans would not deliver such important information as a trap, telling Elizabeth that she believes the Colonel is real and that a meeting with him has been set. Elizabeth has grown tired of Claudia as their handler and tells Philip that she wants her to be reassigned. Philip (posing as an FBI counterintelligence agent named Clark Westerfeld) proposes to FBI employee Martha (Alison Wright) over dinner and she happily accepts.

Nina's (Annet Mahendru) suspicions about Stan Beeman (Noah Emmerich) grow and she accuses him of murdering Vlad, which he strongly denies. Philip asks Martha to plant a listening device in Gaad's office and she agrees. Viola Johnson (Tonye Patano), who planted the bugged clock in Weinberger's study in a previous episode, feels increasingly guilty and confesses to Beeman and Gaad. They surmise that Viola was threatened by the same couple who kidnapped Patterson and Viola meets with a sketch artist. The FBI discover the bug in Weinberger's study and decide to leave it there now that they know the Russians are listening.

After planting the bug, Martha confronts Philip about their relationship, complaining about having to keep it secret. Philip agrees that she can tell her parents about the marriage and Martha tells him she wants to get married over the weekend. Philip and Elizabeth listen in on the bug in Gaad's office but hear no mention of a trap. Prince is arrested for failing to pay child support; Elizabeth fears this has something to do with the meeting with the Colonel. Elizabeth attends the wedding ceremony pretending to be Clark's sister while Claudia poses as his mother. Elizabeth asks Philip if their relationship would have been different if they had taken wedding vows, and Philip says he does not know.

Viola's time with the sketch artist results in the FBI looking for a white couple in their 30s or 40s. Nina, who has grown increasingly tired of Stan's lies, confesses to Arkady about spying for the U.S.

== Production ==
=== Development ===
In April 2013, FX confirmed that the twelfth episode of the series would be titled "The Oath", and that it would be written by Joshua Brand and Melissa James Gibson, and directed by John Dahl. This was Brand's fourth writing credit, Gibson's third writing credit, and Dahl's first directing credit.

== Reception ==
=== Viewers ===
In its original American broadcast, "The Oath" was seen by an estimated 1.49 million household viewers with a 0.5 in the 18–49 demographics. This means that 0.5 percent of all households with televisions watched the episode. This was a 16% decrease in viewership from the previous episode, which was watched by 1.81 million household viewers with a 0.6 in the 18–49 demographics.

=== Critical reviews ===
"The Oath" received critical acclaim. Eric Goldman of IGN gave the episode an "amazing" 9 out of 10 and wrote, "Suffice to say, 'The Oath' was a great way to set up next week's season finale. A lot of balls are in the air, and it seems likely a lot will come crashing down, in dramatic ways, as Season 1 concludes."

Emily St. James of The A.V. Club gave the episode an "A–" grade and wrote, "'The Oath' is a weirdly sedate hour for the penultimate episode of a season of television that's been building to a major confrontation. I think I mean that as a compliment, too, though I'm less sure about it."

Alan Sepinwall of HitFix wrote, "after something of a dud last week, 'The Oath' was pretty fabulous from start to finish – the sort of episode where my notes became littered with profanity as I realized the very risky place so many scenes were heading." Matt Zoller Seitz of Vulture gave the episode a 4 star rating out of 5 and wrote, "'The Oath' answered the chaos and misery of last week's episode 'Covert War' with a kind of dark solidity; picture hot lava hardening into rock."

James Donaghy of The Guardian wrote, "If it was a criticism of The Americans mid-season that nothing really advanced, no one could say that about this week's hectic episode. Much of the action revolves around two big confessions and the fallout from those revelations will go a long way towards shaping next week's finale." Carla Day of TV Fanatic gave the episode a 4.8 star rating out of 5 and wrote, "'The Oath' has put all the relationships and informants in a precarious place going into next Wednesday's season finale. The Weinburger bug has been compromised, but now the Soviets have one in Gaad's office."
