= Safe House (The Americans) =

- The Americans episode
- Episode no.: Season 1 Episode 9
- Directed by: Jim McKay
- Written by: Joshua Brand
- Production code: BDU108
- Original air date: April 3, 2013
- Running time: 48 minutes

Guest appearances
- Richard Thomas as Frank Gaad; Annet Mahendru as Nina; Susan Misner as Sandra Beeman; Alison Wright as Martha Hanson; Betsy Aidem as Miss Kendall; Lev Gorn as Arkady Ivanovich; Vitaly Benko as Vlad; Daniel Flaherty as Matthew Beeman; Aaron Roman Weiner as Agent Brooks; C. J. Wilson as Agent Samuels

Episode chronology
← Previous "Mutually Assured Destruction"	Next → "Only You"
- The Americans season 1

"Safe House" is the ninth episode of the first season of the period drama television series The Americans. It originally aired on FX in the United States on April 3, 2013.

== Plot ==
Philip (Matthew Rhys) and Elizabeth Jennings (Keri Russell) tell their children that they are separating.

The Beemans (Noah Emmerich and Susan Misner) host a party. During the party, Agent Frank Gaad (Richard Thomas) announces to Stan, Chris Amador (Maximiliano Hernández), and other agents that he plans to assassinate Arkady Ivanovich (Lev Gorn), the KGB's Resident, in retaliation for the deaths of the FBI agents from the previous episode.

Philip spends the night with Martha (Alison Wright). Martha reveals that Gaad intends to assassinate a KGB agent. In the morning, she leaves for work. Philip follows, but is stopped by Amador, who is stalking Martha. Amador tells Philip to come in for questioning, but he resists. When Amador pulls a knife, Philip turns it on him, wounding him badly. He puts Amador in his trunk and brings him to a safe house to treat the wound as Elizabeth arrives. They realize he was at Stan's party.

Stan notices Amador is late for work. He goes to Amador's apartment, finding only his car. He reports to Gaad, believing the KGB took Amador hostage. He later meets Nina (Annet Mahendru) and questions her about Amador.

Amador wakes up and asks for water. Philip asks him who the FBI intend to assassinate, but Amador denies any knowledge of the plan. Gaad prepares to seize Arkady when he is out running. Stan shows up, telling Gaad to abort as the KGB will kill Amador. At the embassy, Arkady tells Vlad, a KGB colleague he runs with, that he is not going running. Vlad goes anyway and Stan seizes him. Gaad allows Stan to interrogate Vlad. Unaware of what transpired, Amador tells Elizabeth that Arkady is the target, but he is already dead. Stan calls the embassy, telling Arkady that if they do not release Amador, he will kill Vlad.

Elizabeth calls Arkady to learn whether he is dead, but Arkady answers and she hangs up. Philip and Elizabeth are confused as to why Amador would lie and decide to overdose him on morphine. However, Amador has already died. Philip and Elizabeth dump the body; the police and Stan confirm it is him.

Stan asks Vlad if he works for the KGB. Vlad confirms that he does, but claims not to know anything. Stan shoots Vlad in the back of the head, killing him.

== Production ==
=== Development ===
In March 2013, FX confirmed that the ninth episode of the series would be titled "Safe House", and that it would be written by Joshua Brand, and directed by Jim McKay. This was Brand's second writing credit, and McKay's first directing credit.

== Reception ==
=== Viewers ===
In its original American broadcast, "Safe House" was seen by an estimated 1.38 million household viewers with a 0.4 in the 18–49 demographics. This means that 0.4 percent of all households with televisions watched the episode. This was a 17% decrease in viewership from the previous episode, which was watched by 1.65 million household viewers with a 0.6 in the 18–49 demographics.

=== Critical reviews ===
"Safe House" received extremely positive reviews from critics. Eric Goldman of IGN gave the episode a "great" 8.8 out of 10 and wrote, "Things escalated in a big way this week on The Americans, as we got our first major casualty – as far as one of the main cast is concerned – as events escalated in a big way after Amador saw Philip leaving Martha's apartment."

Emily St. James of The A.V. Club gave the episode a "B+" grade and wrote, "One thing I really like about The Americans that seems to drive some people a little nuts is the way that big political movements aren't really defined by the ideals they espouse but by the people who are contained within those movements."

Alan Sepinwall of HitFix wrote, "Chris wasn't targeted for assassination by the KGB, but he was killed by a KGB agent nonetheless. Vlad died because his boss burned his hand on a potato, but he's still dead. And as we head into the final quarter (or so) of this first season, I expect things to get uglier, whether between the Americans and Soviets or between the fake married but genuinely separated Mr. and Mrs. Jennings." Matt Zoller Seitz of Vulture gave the episode a perfect 5 star rating out of 5 and wrote, "Episode nine of The Americans starts with a traumatic separation: Philip and Elizabeth tell their children, Paige and Henry, that they're splitting up. Things only get worse from there. The rest of this episode is a compendium of trauma, disappointment, misery, and, at the end, horror."

Vicky Frost of The Guardian wrote, "I imagine that Vlad's blood will not serve as recompense for the loss of a scientist and four agents on American soil. It looks as though more (deniable) operations may follow. Perhaps hanging around the Beemans' house wasn't in fact the best idea for KGB officers, regardless of their excellent wig arrangements." Carla Day of TV Fanatic gave the episode a 4.8 star rating out of 5 and wrote, "After a week off the air, The Americans returned with its most intense episode of the season. "Safe House" even beat out the episode when the Jennings were tortured."
