= COMINT (The Americans) =

- The Americans episode
- Episode no.: Season 1 Episode 5
- Directed by: Holly Dale
- Written by: Melissa James Gibson
- Production code: BDU104
- Original air date: February 27, 2013
- Running time: 39 minutes

Guest appearances
- Richard Thomas as Frank Gaad; Annet Mahendru as Nina; Susan Misner as Sandra Beeman; Alison Wright as Martha Hanson; Peter Von Berg as Vasili Nikolaevich; Lev Gorn as Arkady Ivanovich; Margo Martindale as Claudia; Michael Countryman as Adam Dorwin; John Dossett as Kurt Schultz

Episode chronology
← Previous "In Control"	Next → "Trust Me"
- The Americans season 1

"COMINT" is the fifth episode of the first season of the period drama television series The Americans. It originally aired on FX in the United States on February 27, 2013. The name of the episode refers to communications intelligence, a sub-category of signals intelligence that engages in dealing with messages or voice information derived from the interception of foreign communications.

== Plot ==
Elizabeth Jennings (Keri Russell), posing as a security company inspector, goes to the home of Adam Dorwin (Michael Countryman), an anti-ballistics program contractor who has recently lost his wife. Elizabeth asks if he had received communications from foreign agents, and he assures her he had not even told his wife about his job. Dorwin is revealed to be a KGB agent, whom Elizabeth was subtly prompting to call his handler. After she leaves, Dorwin proceeds to call his handler, Vasili Nikolaevich (Peter Von Berg) from the Soviet embassy. Dorwin says that he is losing it and Vasili says that they will meet soon. The FBI hears that Dorwin may be ready to spy for them, as he is becoming uneasy.

Elizabeth meets Claudia (Margo Martindale) and tells her that, if pressed harder, Dorwin would have told her everything. Claudia tells her that Dorwin had sent four signals for a meet in the last week, but no meet took place because FBI surveillance teams are using new encryption on their radios, so Russian agents cannot tell when they are being followed. Claudia then tells Elizabeth about an agent she ran in West Germany – a loner whom she befriended. One day, they did not need him any more, so he killed himself.

Stan Beeman (Noah Emmerich) convinces Nina (Annet Mahendru) to find out what is going on with Dorwin. Nina performs fellatio on Vasili for information. He tells her that Dorwin simply has the "jitters". Stan is hurt when Nina tells him how she got Vasili to talk. Elizabeth finds and seduces the FBI contractor of the encryption cards hidden in the trunks of FBI vehicles. He begins to beat her with his belt and Elizabeth, pretending to be scared, begs him to stop. When Philip (Matthew Rhys) sees the marks on her back, he is furious and tells Elizabeth that he will deal with the contractor. Elizabeth is insulted, stating: "If I wanted to deal with him, you don't think he'd be dealt with?"

On their mission, Philip and Elizabeth argue in the car about the FBI contractor. Elizabeth confirms that FBI agents are tailing them two cars behind. Philip brakes suddenly, causing the FBI vehicle to rear-end an elderly woman's car in between them. The FBI agents go to a garage to get their car repaired, while Philip pretends to need repairs on his vehicle. His car is placed on an adjacent lift. While both cars are on lifts and Philip is distracting the mechanic and FBI agents below the cars, Elizabeth, hiding in the trunk of Philip's car, gets out and, out of view, climbs into the FBI agents' trunk. She finds the encryption card she needs, but is unable to leave as the car has been fixed. She is driven in the trunk to the FBI headquarters, but escapes and meets Philip outside.

Stan is at home learning Russian by tape when his wife, Sandra (Susan Misner), tries to bring him to bed, but he declines. She reminds him of happier times, but he declines again and continues to listen to the tape. The next day, Nina, in Vasili's office giving him oral sex under his desk, overhears Arkady Ivanovich (Lev Gorn) tell Vasili that they have the encryption codes. Vasili tells him to organize a meet for the next day with Dorwin. Nina tells Stan this and the FBI has the codes changed.

Hearing static, Arkady tells Vasili that the FBI must have changed the codes and that Dorwin may be leading him into a trap. Vasili goes anyway, leading the FBI to follow him. At the same time, Dorwin is in another location. He is shot in the head and killed by Elizabeth. Philip meets Claudia, who tells him that there is a mole working for the FBI.

== Production ==
=== Development ===
In February 2013, FX confirmed that the fifth episode of the series would be titled "COMINT", and that it would be written by Melissa James Gibson, and directed by Holly Dale. This was Gibson's first writing credit, Dale's first directing credit.

== Reception ==
=== Viewers ===
In its original American broadcast, "COMINT" was seen by an estimated 1.44 million household viewers with a 0.5 in the 18–49 demographics. This means that 0.5 percent of all households with televisions watched the episode. This was a 25% decrease in viewership from the previous episode, which was watched by 1.91 million household viewers with a 0.8 in the 18–49 demographics.

=== Critical reviews ===
"COMINT" received extremely positive reviews from critics. Eric Goldman of IGN gave the episode a "great" 8.5 out of 10 and wrote, "Wow, this show sure isn't glamorizing the life of a spy, is it? We already saw that Elizabeth and Philip routinely slept with people as part of their job, whether they want to or not. But as 'COMINT' showed, that can also include some true ugliness, as Elizabeth was put in a horrible and outright dangerous scenario by a guy with a thing for inflicting pain."

Emily St. James of The A.V. Club gave the episode an "A–" grade and wrote, "'Comint' is perhaps a little slower than the last few episodes, but it might be my favorite episode of the show yet, accomplishing a great deal of fleshing out of a lot of the characters, all without having any big moments where somebody stops and delivers a monologue about why they are the way they are."

Alan Sepinwall of HitFix wrote, "Some people manage to play the game long enough to become as old and relatively serene as Granny, or Vasilli. Others can't hang on, though. It's all too much. And it's watching the emotional toll this is taking on all the characters that’s made The Americans such gripping television over these first five excellent weeks." Matt Zoller Seitz of Vulture gave the episode a 4 star rating out of 5 and wrote, "As written by Melissa James Gibson and directed by Holly Dale, 'Comint' doesn't flinch from any of its issues, but it's never salacious. Many of the more upsetting images are framed or cut in a way that gives humiliated characters a shred of dignity."

Vicky Frost of The Guardian wrote, "There was an interesting discussion about sex here. How it can be used to manipulate and betray the innocent party, its effect on both the exploiter and the exploited, the vulnerabilities we expose when we shed our clothes before another." Carla Day of TV Fanatic gave the episode a 4.8 star rating out of 5 and wrote, "'COMINT' provided a look at how both Soviet and American spies and assets acquire information and the sacrifices that are made to get a step ahead of their adversaries. Often, it involves sex."
