= Trust Me (The Americans) =

- The Americans episode
- Episode no.: Season 1 Episode 6
- Directed by: Daniel Sackheim
- Written by: Sneha Koorse
- Production code: BDU105
- Original air date: March 6, 2013
- Running time: 49 minutes

Guest appearances
- Derek Luke as Gregory Thomas; Richard Thomas as Frank Gaad; Annet Mahendru as Nina; Susan Misner as Sandra Beeman; Alison Wright as Martha Hanson; Peter Von Berg as Vasili Nikolaevich; Lev Gorn as Arkady Ivanovich; Margo Martindale as Claudia; Vitaly Benko as Vlad; Robert Bogue as Cal; Mike Oberholtzer as Nick

Episode chronology
← Previous "COMINT"	Next → "Duty and Honor"
- The Americans season 1

"Trust Me" is the sixth episode of the first season of the period drama television series The Americans. It originally aired on FX in the United States on March 6, 2013.

== Plot ==
Philip (Matthew Rhys) and Elizabeth Jennings (Keri Russell) are concerned about the FBI's mole. Philip (as Clark) plans to meet with Martha Hanson (Alison Wright), Agent Gaad's secretary, but while making plans at a phone booth, he is abducted and thrown into a van. Back at the Jennings' home, Elizabeth hears a noise upstairs and investigates. She is attacked by an intruder and fights back, but is taken away by a second man.

In an abandoned warehouse, Philip is tied to a chair and being interrogated by Cal (Robert Bogue) who removes Philip's wig and glasses and calls him a "commie". He shows Philip his various passports under different aliases and plays conversations he had with Martha. Cal threatens to send Philip's children to Russia. Elizabeth is thrown into a small room with pictures of her family all over the wall.

Later, Philip's head is held under water in front of Elizabeth. Philip refuses to give them any names, even when they threaten to do the same to Elizabeth. Elizabeth asserts that she and Philip will die before they talk. Claudia (Margo Martindale) enters, revealing the abduction to be a ruse by the KGB. After the codes were changed, Philip and Elizabeth were the first suspects. Philip is furious that the KGB is questioning their loyalty, and Claudia tells Elizabeth the decision went over Zhukov's head. Elizabeth submerges Claudia's head under water and then badly beats her face, saying: "Tell whoever approved this that your face is a present from me to them." After leaving the warehouse, Philip wonders why they stopped interrogating Elizabeth. He accuses her of telling them that he considered defecting, but she denies this, although admitting that she told them he liked living in the U.S. too much.

Meanwhile, Paige (Holly Taylor) and Henry (Keidrich Sellati) are stranded while their parents are missing. Paige decides to hitchhike, despite Henry's reservations. They are picked up by Nick (Michael Oberholtzer). Nick takes a detour, saying that he wants to feed the ducks before dropping them off. Nick's behavior changes – he offers Paige a beer, tells her that she'll be very attractive in a few years, and talks about his faith in God, stating, "Without a higher power, we’re no better than wild dogs." Henry, who notices a knife on Nick, takes a beer bottle and smashes it across his head as he and Paige escape.

Agent Gaad (Richard Thomas) hands Stan Beeman (Noah Emmerich) a file on the shooting of Adam Dorwin. He tells him that Dorwin was murdered at the same time the FBI were tracking Vasili and informs him of the missing defense blueprints. Stan meets up with Nina (Annet Mahendru), who refuses to continue to spy for the FBI as the Russians are now aware of the mole. Stan tells her to trust him and then gives her a camera to take pictures of confidential files at the embassy. Nina calls this suicide as she won't be able to take the files past the heavy security. Stan assures her that she won't have to. Later, Nina takes classified documents and brings them to the bathroom and photographs them in a stall.

Vasili is buying tea in a store. Vasili's change for the purchase is dropped by the clerk, and when Vasili is picking it up, the clerk, unnoticed, drops something in his bag. Stan calls the embassy and asks for Vasili, telling the person on the other line to leave a message from Theo about the tea store he visited and that he will enjoy. Stan calls again, stating that it is urgent this time. Arkady discusses the messages from "Theo" with Vasili and tells him they must search his office just in case. The innocent Vasili complies, and Arkady finds diamonds that were placed in his tea bag. Vasili denies any knowledge of them and, as his office is searched more thoroughly, Arkady finds Nina's camera behind a clock with the pictures of the classified documents. Vasili realizes he has been set up.

Philip and Elizabeth purposefully crash their car into a tree on their way home, using the crash as an alibi. They return to Paige and Henry and tell them about the accident. Elizabeth later apologizes to Philip and tells him that she herself feels betrayed by the people she trusts most in the world. Philip is still upset and goes to sleep on the couch.

== Production ==
=== Development ===
In February 2013, FX confirmed that the sixth episode of the series would be titled "Trust Me", and that it would be written by Sneha Koorse, and directed by Daniel Sackheim. This was Koorse's first writing credit, Sackheim's first directing credit.

== Reception ==
=== Viewers ===
In its original American broadcast, "Trust Me" was seen by an estimated 1.88 million household viewers with a 0.7 in the 18–49 demographics. This means that 0.7 percent of all households with televisions watched the episode. This was a 30% increase in viewership from the previous episode, which was watched by 1.44 million household viewers with a 0.5 in the 18–49 demographics.

=== Critical reviews ===
"Trust Me" received critical acclaim. Eric Goldman of IGN gave the episode an "amazing" 9 out of 10 and wrote, "This week's Americans gave us a 'What if?' scenario, as the Jennings found themselves apparently found out as spies, captured and tortured. Yes, shortly before the ruse was revealed, I realized it couldn't be real – it's too early in the series and it was clear the FBI were not involved in any of this. But still, Elizabeth and Philip were put through hell and it was shocking and powerful to see."

Emily St. James of The A.V. Club gave the episode an "A–" grade and wrote, "The Americans cannily uses whatever feelings we have about Russell against us, and while she plays someone who could be Felicity all grown up in the 'normal' scenes, she's a titanic cauldron of rage who's been threatening to boil over everywhere else."

Alan Sepinwall of HitFix wrote, "'Trust Me' is perhaps the most uneven episode of The Americans to date. It features three intertwined stories: one terrible, one gripping, and one that starts off problematic but concludes with some of the series' very best moments." Matt Zoller Seitz of Vulture gave the episode a 4 star rating out of 5 and wrote, "As written by Sneha Koorse and directed by Daniel Sackheim, it's a pull-the-rug-out-from-under-you episode that puts the audience in the position of many of its major characters. It plunges you into unfamiliar, terrifying situations. You aren’t sure what's happening, whom to trust, what it all means, where it's all leading."

Vicky Frost of The Guardian wrote, "while the Americans might have some large and puzzling plotholes, it is very big on that kind of strong storytelling in which events and themes are mirrored and balanced across various characters and organisations, neatly contrasted for maximum effect." Carla Day of TV Fanatic gave the episode a 4.7 star rating out of 5 and wrote, "The Americans has done an exceptional job over the first six episodes with shaking up the format. It's definitely not a case-of-the-week show. Each episode is centered around something entirely different than the others: it's fixing a mistake, forcing an American to cooperate, telling the story of a historical event, or presenting the core emotional basis of being human."
