= St. Frederick High School =

St. Frederick High School may refer to:

- St. Frederick High School (Pontiac, Michigan)
- St. Frederick High School (Monroe, Louisiana)
