= The Americans season 1 =

The Americans
- Season 1
- DVD cover
- No. of episodes: 13

Release
- Original network: FX
- Original release: January 30 – May 1, 2013

Season chronology
- Next → Season 2

The first season of the American television drama series The Americans premiered on January 30, 2013, and concluded on May 1, 2013. It consisted of 13 episodes, each running for approximately 45 minutes, except for a pilot of over an hour. FX broadcast the first season on Wednesdays at 10:00 pm in the United States. The series is produced by DreamWorks Television. The Americans was created by Joe Weisberg.

Set in the 1980s during the Cold War period, The Americans is the story of Elizabeth and Philip Jennings, two Soviet KGB officers posing as a married American couple in the suburbs of Washington, D.C., their two children, and their neighbor Stan Beeman, an FBI agent.

== Cast ==
=== Main ===
- Keri Russell as Elizabeth Jennings (Nadezhda), a KGB officer
- Matthew Rhys as Philip Jennings (Mischa), a KGB officer
- Maximiliano Hernández as FBI Agent Chris Amador
- Holly Taylor as Paige Jennings, Elizabeth and Philip's daughter
- Keidrich Sellati as Henry Jennings, Elizabeth and Philip's son
- Noah Emmerich as FBI Agent Stan Beeman

=== Recurring ===
- Richard Thomas as Agent Frank Gaad, Special Agent In Charge of the FBI Counterintelligence Division
- Annet Mahendru as Nina Sergeevna, Agent Beeman's Soviet mole
- Margo Martindale as Claudia, the Jennings' KGB supervisor
- Susan Misner as Sandra Beeman, Stan's wife
- Alison Wright as Martha Hanson, Agent Gaad's secretary and Philip's informant
- Lev Gorn as Arkady Ivanovich, the KGB's second Rezident
- Daniel Flaherty as Matthew Beeman, Stan's son
- Peter Von Berg as Vasili Nikolaevich, the KGB's original Rezident
- Derek Luke as Gregory Thomas, Elizabeth's KGB recruit
- Reg Rogers as Charles Duluth, a journalist and KGB source
- Gillian Alexy as Annelise, an informant of Philip's

== Production ==
=== Conception ===
The Americans was created by Joe Weisberg, a former CIA officer. Despite setting the story in the world of espionage, Weisberg set out to tell the story about a marriage. "The Americans is at its core a marriage story. International relations is just an allegory for the human relations. Sometimes, when you're struggling in your marriage or with your kid, it feels like life or death. For Philip and Elizabeth, it often is." Executive producer Joel Fields described the series as working different levels of reality: the fictional marriage between Philip and Elizabeth, and the real-world experiences of the Cold War.

"The most interesting thing I observed during my time at the CIA was the family life of agents who served abroad with kids and spouses. The reality is that mostly they're just people going about their lives. The job is one element, and trying to depict the issues they face just seemed like something that, if we could bring it to television in a realistic way, would be new."

— Joe Weisberg, creator and showrunner of The Americans

Weisberg described working at the CIA as a mistake, but indicated it helped him develop several storylines in the series, basing some plot lines on real-life stories, and integrating several things he learned in his training, such as communication protocols and the use of dead drops. Weisberg was fascinated by stories he had heard from spies who had served abroad while raising their families. He was interested in bringing that concept to television, with the idea of a family of spies, rather than just one person. Weisberg also said that the CIA inadvertently gave him the idea for creating a series around spies, explaining, "While I was taking the polygraph exam to get in, they asked the question, 'Are you joining the CIA in order to gain experience about the intelligence community so that you can write about it later' – which had never occurred to me. I was totally joining the CIA because I wanted to be a spy. But the second they asked that question…then I thought, 'Now I'm going to fail the test.'"

Weisberg was partially influenced by the events of the Illegals Program to write a pilot script for the series. His research material included notes on the KGB's Cold War left by Vasili Mitrokhin and conversations with some of his former colleagues at the CIA. He stated that, unlike the circumstances involving the 2010 Russian spy ring, he had opted to set the story in the early 1980s because "a modern day [setting] didn't seem like a good idea", adding, "People were both shocked and simultaneously shrugged at the [2010] scandal because it didn't seem like we were really enemies with Russia anymore. An obvious way to remedy that for television was to stick it back in the Cold War. At first, the '70s appealed to me just because I loved the hair and the music. But can you think of a better time than the '80s with Ronald Reagan yelling about the evil empire?"

=== Development ===
After reading Weisberg's novel, An Ordinary Spy, executive producer Graham Yost discovered that Weisberg had also written a pilot for a possible spy series. Yost read the pilot and discovered that it was "annoyingly good", which led to the beginning of motions to develop the show. Shooting of the pilot began in May 2012 and lasted until mid-June. Filming began for the rest of the first season in November 2012 in the New York City area. The production used location shots to simulate a dramatic setting of Washington, D.C. Early filming was delayed by flooding caused by Hurricane Sandy.

=== Casting ===
Weisberg stated that he had no idea about who would star in the series before casting began. FX president John Landgraf had the idea to cast Keri Russell in the series. Leslie Feldman, who is the head of casting at DreamWorks, saw Matthew Rhys in a play and suggested him to Weisberg. Russell and Rhys had met briefly at a party years before, but were not fully introduced. They both were attracted to the series because of its focus on the relationship between their characters. Said Rhys, "You have two people who have led the most incredibly strange life together with incredibly high stakes, in this scene of domesticity that is an absolute lie, and at the end of the pilot they're finding each other for the very first time."

Russell described the pilot script as "interesting ... it was so far from a procedural. I didn't know that I wanted to do it. I always say no to everything. I never want to do anything. [Laughs.] But I just couldn't stop thinking about it. I read it...and I kept trying to figure it out, because it's so not clear. It's still not clear to me. But there's so many different levels to it". Rhys said of his character, "He's a sort of gift of a part in that he's very sort of layered and multi-faceted. And when you meet him, he's at this great turning point in his life where everything's changing for him. You just get to do everything. You get to do the kung fu, and you get to do the emotional scenes, you get to do the disguises. It's the full package for an actor. It's a dream." Noah Emmerich was initially hesitant about taking a role in the series. He explained: "The truth is, from the very beginning, I thought, 'I don't want to do a TV show where I carry a gun or a badge. I'm done with guns and badges. I just don't want to do that anymore'. When I first read it I thought, 'Yeah, it's really interesting and really good, but I don't want to be an FBI guy.'" His friend, Gavin O'Connor, who directed the pilot episode, convinced him to take a closer look at the role. Emmerich stated that he responded to the aspect of marriage and family. "It was really interesting, and it was really intelligent and unusual, and it stood out from the pack."

== Episodes ==
| No. overall | No. in season | Title | Directed by | Written by | Original release date | Prod. code | US viewers (millions) |
|---|---|---|---|---|---|---|---|
| 1 | 1 | "Pilot" | Gavin O'Connor | Joe Weisberg | January 30, 2013 | BDU179 | 3.22 |
In January 1981, Philip and Elizabeth Jennings are deep cover Soviet intelligence agents from the KGB's secretive Directorate S, operating in Washington, D.C. Their children, Paige and Henry, do not know their secret. The Jenningses abduct Timochev, a Soviet defector, but his stabbing of a third agent during the kidnapping prevents his transfer back to the USSR. Meanwhile, FBI counter-intelligence agent Stan Beeman has moved in across the street with his family. Philip and Elizabeth disagree on what to do with Timochev in the wake of Stan's presence, with Philip prepared to take him to Stan. However, Timochev reveals he had raped Elizabeth during training years before, leading Philip to kill him. The Jenningses dump the body in the Potomac River. Stan becomes suspicious when he learns that a car similar to Philip's is seen near the site of Timochev's abduction, but finds nothing when he covertly inspects Philip's trunk. In response to Timochev's disappearance, President Ronald Reagan issues a top secret executive order authorizing the FBI to use whatever means necessary to neutralize Soviet agents operating within the United States.
| 2 | 2 | "The Clock" | Adam Arkin | Joe Weisberg | February 6, 2013 | BDU101 | 1.97 |
Philip poses as a Swedish intelligence officer to seduce Annelise and convince her to discreetly photograph the office of Secretary of Defense Caspar Weinberger. A meeting is to take place in three days between Weinberger, British Prime Minister Margaret Thatcher and her defence secretary John Nott to discuss the Americans' proposed Strategic Defense Initiative. Philip and Elizabeth have orders to infiltrate and bug the office; using the photos, they decide to plant the bug in a clock. They coerce the Weinbergers' cleaning lady, Viola, into helping in the plot. Meanwhile, Stan blackmails Nina, a Soviet embassy clerk, to spy for the FBI. She sees the Soviet ambassador celebrating his own undercover agents' work. Meanwhile, Soviet embassy officials listen to a conversation about the SDI.
| 3 | 3 | "Gregory" | Thomas Schlamme | Joel Fields | February 13, 2013 | BDU102 | 1.65 |
Nina tells Stan about a Soviet agent who was killed the night Timochev went missing. The dead agent is shown to be Rob, the man Timochev had stabbed. The FBI trace him to an address in Philadelphia and discover he had a wife and child. The Jenningses are puzzled when they receive a message from Rob scheduling a meeting in Philadelphia. Suspicious, Philip sends Gregory, a former black militant recruited by Elizabeth, to go to the meeting with his team. There, Gregory deduces that Rob's wife Joyce had set up the meeting, unaware of the surveillance by the FBI. Using his team to distract the FBI, Gregory kidnaps her. Joyce gives Philip a coded note from Rob. Claudia, the Jennings' new KGB supervisor, tells him to contact the person mentioned in the note. The contact sells him schematics for an anti-missile laser. Meanwhile, the Jenningses hand Joyce and her baby over to Claudia, who promises that she will be relocated to Cuba. In the Soviet Union, the baby is handed to Rob's parents. Joyce is found dead by the FBI from a staged drug overdose.
| 4 | 4 | "In Control" | Jean de Segonzac | Joel Fields & Joe Weisberg | February 20, 2013 | BDU103 | 1.91 |
On March 30, 1981, President Reagan is shot. Both nations' agencies are eager to learn if the other is involved. After completing their first mission of questioning Reagan's nurses who ensure he will survive, the Jennings learn they are to mark key US officials for future sniper hits. This leads to their discovery that Secretary of State Alexander Haig, who to some appeared to have taken control of the White House as acting president, may have the launch codes to the country's nuclear arsenal. Elizabeth wants to inform the Soviets, but Philip insists on further investigation. They see Stan arrive home and learn what he knows. He gives John Hinckley Jr.'s motivation behind the attempt; there was a concern the Soviets might have been involved, but it was quickly refuted. As Stan and his wife grow farther apart, Philip and Elizabeth get closer, as they agree that their act of withholding of the Haig intelligence could get them killed.
| 5 | 5 | "COMINT" | Holly Dale | Melissa James Gibson | February 27, 2013 | BDU104 | 1.44 |
Elizabeth meets with Adam Dorwin, a manager of a private company contracted by the US government for the missile defense program. Dorwin is later revealed to be a KGB agent codenamed "Udacha", and feels nervous and alone because the KGB cannot contact him out of fear the FBI capturing him; the FBI has new encrypted radios so the KGB cannot tell when they are being followed. Elizabeth turns her focus on another man who handles the technology, and learns the encryption devices are mobile. She and Philip track down one of the mobile units in the trunk of an FBI car. Elizabeth manages to make an imprint of an encrypted card, at the risk of being caught in the car's trunk. Meanwhile, Stan pressures Nina into learning if the KGB will meet with Udacha. When the code is learned by the KGB, the meeting is set. The FBI knew of it and follows Udacha's contact to the supposed meet, while Elizabeth kills Udacha at another site. These actions force the KGB to realize they have a mole.
| 6 | 6 | "Trust Me" | Daniel Sackheim | Sneha Koorse | March 6, 2013 | BDU105 | 1.88 |
Philip and Elizabeth are separately abducted and questioned about being KGB spies in America. Neither admit to it, even if evidence is presented otherwise. Their captors are revealed to be KGB agents trying to ferret out the mole, as the Jennings were first to discover the encryptions which were immediately changed by the FBI. The Jenningses manage to turn the tables on their captors; Elizabeth mercilessly beats Claudia to send a message to whoever authorized their abduction. Philip seethes at Elizabeth for what he considers a betrayal after she tells him that she had earlier told their handlers that he "liked the US too much" which he feels has led to them being under suspicion. Although fearing being caught, Nina frames Vasili, the KGB Rezident, in a plan devised by Stan. Meanwhile, not knowing where their parents are, Paige and Henry hitchhike home from the mall. Nick (Michael Oberholtzer), the man who picks them up, becomes suggestive towards them, leading them to escape after he stops along the way. The two kids promise to keep the situation a secret between them.
| 7 | 7 | "Duty and Honor" | Alex Chapple | Joshua Brand | March 13, 2013 | BDU106 | 1.70 |
Philip is sent to New York City to discredit a Polish dissident. While there, he has sex with agent Irina Semenova, who was his lover before he left Russia. She asserts that her son in Russia is from their relationship. After the successful mission, she tells Philip she plans to leave the KGB and disappear; she invites Philip to join her, but he declines. Elizabeth gains a new source within the SDI project by paying off his gambling debt. Meanwhile, Stan misses a family dinner to work late; his colleague takes him to a bar and urges him to pick up a woman for casual sex, but he instead calls Nina, and they have sex. Agent Gaad indicates that the FBI may never deliver on Stan's promise to extricate Nina from the embassy. When Philip returns, Elizabeth apologizes for their prior rift and asks him to try to make their marriage real. He agrees, but lies to her about his night with Irina.
| 8 | 8 | "Mutually Assured Destruction" | Bill Johnson | Joel Fields & Joe Weisberg | March 20, 2013 | BDU107 | 1.65 |
Claudia tells Elizabeth about Philip's affair with Irina; Elizabeth decides to be his professional partner only and abandon the "real marriage". Elsewhere, the KGB has hired a West German contractor to kill American scientists, but has changed its mind and cannot recall him. With unwitting help from Philip's informant Martha, an FBI clerical worker, the Jenningses track him down and eliminate him. However, he has already rigged a time bomb that kills a scientist and three of his FBI bodyguards — Gaad vows vengeance. Meanwhile, until Nina can be extracted for protection, Gaad gives Stan the keys to a safe house in which to meet her, which she surmises Stan means to be their love nest. Lastly, after being spurned by Martha, Agent Amador becomes suspicious and starts to follow her.
| 9 | 9 | "Safe House" | Jim McKay | Joshua Brand | April 3, 2013 | BDU108 | 1.38 |
Philip and Elizabeth tell the kids that they are going to live apart for a while—they do not take it well. Meanwhile, Gaad plans to assassinate Arkady, the new KGB resident, on his regular jogging route. Philip spends the night with Martha, and the next morning Amador confronts him. They fight and Amador is stabbed; Philip takes him to a deserted building where he and Elizabeth attempt to treat him and question him about the FBI's plans. At the time of Arkady's regular jog, the FBI find only his assistant Vlad, as Arkady is fortuitously injured. On Stan's unauthorized initiative, the FBI seize Vlad and take him to the safe house. Stan phones Arkady and threatens to kill Vlad unless Amador is released. Amador dies in the Jennings' custody and they dump the body; after he is found, Stan returns to the safe house and kills Vlad.
| 10 | 10 | "Only You" | Adam Arkin | Bradford Winters | April 10, 2013 | BDU109 | 1.50 |
The FBI investigation of Amador's death makes rapid progress when Amador's ring (which he left in the trunk of the car transporting him) turns up at a pawn shop. Stan locates an associate of Gregory's who ditched the car, and is hot on the tail of Gregory himself. The KGB, to cut its losses, frames Gregory for the murder of Amador and offers him exfiltration to Moscow. He refuses and instead proposes to end his life on his own terms, and neither Claudia nor Elizabeth can change his mind. Claudia asks Philip to kill him out of compassion for Elizabeth, but Elizabeth convinces him to agree to Gregory's own plan, which turns out to be a fatal shootout with the police. Meanwhile, Stan promises Nina he will find out who killed Vlad; Stan's wife asks him to quit the FBI and move away with his family; and the Jennings deal with boundary issues in their separate parenting.
| 11 | 11 | "Covert War" | Nicole Kassell | Joshua Brand & Melissa James Gibson | April 17, 2013 | BDU110 | 1.81 |
The CIA assassinates three KGB officials in Moscow, including Elizabeth's mentor, General Victor Zhukov. Elizabeth decides, against KGB orders, to kill the CIA official who Claudia claims planned the operation. She succeeds in abducting him, but eventually relents and lets him go. Afterwards, Elizabeth visits Philip to reconcile, but leaves when she learns he has rented an apartment. She then confronts Claudia, accusing her of manipulating her into moving against the CIA official to destroy her career. Claudia says that she was Zhukov's lover and denies any ill will toward the Jenningses; she is surprised that Elizabeth did not carry out the killing. Meanwhile, Stan's wife leaves him; he goes to Nina and attempts to break off their affair, but ends up losing his resolve to have sex with her instead. The newly promoted Nina is given access to the material obtained by the Weinberger bug, but keeps the information from Stan in order to further investigate Vlad's death. Martha surprises "Clark" by introducing him to her parents, who like him.
| 12 | 12 | "The Oath" | John Dahl | Joshua Brand & Melissa James Gibson | April 24, 2013 | BDU111 | 1.49 |
Elizabeth's new source, Sanford Prince, tells her he has recruited an Air Force colonel who will give important information on the SDI project for $50,000. After seeing some of this information, Moscow orders Elizabeth to meet with the colonel despite her misgivings. To see whether the FBI are on to them, Philip asks Martha to plant a bug in Gaad's office, promising to marry her to ensure her loyalty. He does so in a private ceremony witnessed only by her parents and Clark's "mother" (Claudia) and "sister" (Elizabeth). With the planned meeting only a few days away, Prince is arrested for an unrelated child support issue. Viola tells the FBI about being forced to plant the bug; they provide the KGB with disinformation through it. From her account, and that of the CIA official that the Jenningses abducted, Stan and Gaad conclude that they are looking for a thirtysomething married couple and produce a sketch of them. Meanwhile, Nina is sworn into Directorate S and, after a conversation with Stan, confesses her spying to Arkady and offers to become a re-doubled agent.
| 13 | 13 | "The Colonel" | Adam Arkin | Joel Fields & Joe Weisberg | May 1, 2013 | BDU112 | 1.74 |
With the meeting with the colonel approaching, Claudia and the Jennings are worried that it has been compromised. Claudia urges Arkady to abort the mission, while Philip and Elizabeth work out a plan to take the kids to Canada if one of them is captured. Arkady accepts Nina's offer in spite of Moscow's skepticism. Meanwhile, Stan tells both Sandra and Nina that his counterintelligence mission will soon be over, but Sandra rebuffs his attempt at reconciliation and Nina tells Arkady. Without incident, Philip meets with the colonel, who asserts that the SDI project is technically infeasible and may even be a ruse to get the USSR to waste resources. Because of Nina's tip, Arkady cleverly manages to get an abort order to Claudia, who warns Philip; they both realize Elizabeth is the one in danger. Philip picks up Elizabeth just as she reaches the parked car with the Weinberger tapes, which the FBI has staked out. They evade the FBI pursuit, but Elizabeth is shot in the abdomen. While she is being treated at the deserted building, Philip phones Stan and has him look after the kids. While in recovery, Elizabeth speaks to Philip for the first time in their native Russian, asking him to "Come home." Meanwhile, Claudia assassinates the CIA official that Elizabeth spared. Prince cracks under FBI pressure and tells them all he knows about the colonel, while Nina gives Arkady a file on Stan. Paige is increasingly puzzled by Elizabeth's behavior and, late at night, enters the home's laundry room—which is off-limits to the kids—but all she finds is laundry.

== Reception ==
=== Reviews ===
The first season of The Americans received positive reviews from critics. Based on 51 reviews collected by Rotten Tomatoes, the first season received an 88% approval rating from critics, with an average score of 7.8 out of 10. The consensus reads, "The Americans is a spy thriller of the highest order, with evocative period touches and strong chemistry between its leads." On Metacritic, the first season scored 78 out of 100 based on 35 reviews. The American Film Institute listed it as one of the top ten television series of 2013. Rob Brunner of Entertainment Weekly described it as "an absorbing spy thriller" while David Hinkley of the New York Daily News praised the pace, noting that "It's a premise that requires as much clever dramatic footwork as you might expect, and creator Joe Weisberg, a former CIA agent, handles the challenge". Verne Gay of Newsday called it a "smart newcomer with a pair of leads that turns The Americans into a likely winner" and gave it a grade of an A−. Gail Pennington, television critic for the St. Louis Post-Dispatch gave The Americans a rating of three out of four stars. In her review of the debut episode, Pennington stated "The Americans isn't just a heart-pounding action drama; by presenting heroes that are also villains, it also confronts viewers with TV's deepest moral dilemma since The Sopranos". However, Hank Stuever of The Washington Post observed that "The Americans struggles to crack a certain code; the concept is tantalizing, but the follow-through lacks the momentum that gets viewers to commit". He described it, however, as "another well-made, provocative TV drama" and suggested that it "could benefit from having the finite boundaries of being a miniseries rather than launching itself into the ambitious realm of an ongoing series."

=== Awards and nominations ===
| Year | Association | Category | Nominee(s) | Result |
|---|---|---|---|---|
| 2013 | 3rd Critics' Choice Television Awards | Best Drama Actor | Matthew Rhys | Nominated |
| 2013 | 3rd Critics' Choice Television Awards | Best Drama Actress | Keri Russell | Nominated |
| 2013 | 3rd Critics' Choice Television Awards | Best Drama Series | | Nominated |
| 2013 | 3rd Critics' Choice Television Awards | Best Drama Supporting Actor | Noah Emmerich | Nominated |
| 2013 | 29th TCA Awards | Individual Achievement in Drama | Matthew Rhys | Nominated |
| 2013 | 29th TCA Awards | Outstanding New Program | | Won |
| 2013 | 29th TCA Awards | Outstanding Achievement in Drama | | Nominated |
| 2013 | 29th TCA Awards | Program of the Year | | Nominated |
| 2013 | 65th Primetime Emmy Awards | Outstanding Guest Actress in a Drama Series | Margo Martindale | Nominated |
| 2013 | 65th Primetime Emmy Awards | Outstanding Original Main Title Theme Music | Nathan Barr | Nominated |
| 2013 | 18th Satellite Awards | Best Actress in a Drama Series | Keri Russell | Nominated |
| 2013 | 18th Satellite Awards | Best Drama Series | | Nominated |
| 2013 | 18th Satellite Awards | Best Supporting Actress in a Series, Miniseries, or TV Movie | Margo Martindale | Nominated |
| 2013 | 66th Writers Guild of America Awards | Best New Series | | Nominated |
| 2013 | American Film Institute Awards 2013 | Best Television Program of The Year | | Listed |

== Home media release ==
The first season of The Americans was released on Blu-ray and DVD in region 1 on February 11, 2014 and in region 2 on March 3, 2014. The set includes an audio commentary for "The Colonel" by Joe Weisberg, Joel Fields and Noah Emmerich; three featurettes, "Executive Order 2579: Exposing the Americans", "Perfecting the Art of Espionage" and "Ingenuity Over Technology"; a gag reel; deleted scenes; and trailers.
