= Marina Squerciati =

American actress

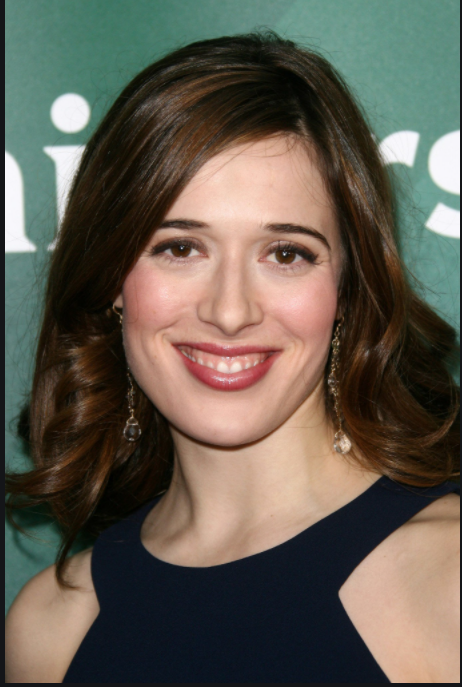
- Born: New York City, U.S
- Education: Northwestern University (B.A.)
- Occupation: Actress
- Years active: 1993–present
- Spouse: Eli Kay-Oliphant
- Children: 2

Marina Squerciati is an American actress. She currently appears as a regular in Chicago P.D. as Detective Kim Burgess.

== Early life ==
Marina Squerciati was born in New York City, and she is of Italian heritage on her mother's side. She is the daughter of academic and writer Marie Squerciati.

Squerciati grew up on the Upper West Side of Manhattan. She graduated from Northwestern University with a B.A. in theater in 2003.

== Career ==
=== Theater work ===
For her work in theater, Squerciati won the Agnes Moorehead award for her performance as Judy Holliday in the off-Broadway play Just in Time: The Judy Holliday Story at the Lucille Lortel Theatre. Squerciati made her Broadway debut in an adaptation of Ernst Lubitsch's To Be or Not to Be, directed by Tony Award winner Casey Nicholaw. Off-Broadway, she starred in Manipulation, Beauty of the Father and others. Squerciati created the role of "Kerri Taylor" in the a cappella musical comedy Perfect Harmony, and was a member of The Essentials.

=== Film and television ===
In 1993, Squerciati appeared in The Nutcracker, directed by Emile Ardolino.

She made her feature film debut in It's Complicated in 2009. In 2012, she appeared in the films Alter Egos and Frances Ha. She also starred in the indie film Sparks based on the comic SPARKS by William Katt.

Her television debut was on Law & Order: Criminal Intent in 2009. After appearing in guest roles on The Good Wife, Damages, Blue Bloods and Law & Order: Special Victims Unit in 2010 and 2011, she gained attention in the fall of 2011 in an 8-episode arc on the fifth season of Gossip Girl. In 2013, she guest starred on the FX series The Americans as a Soviet spy.

In August 2013, it was announced that Squerciati had been cast as Officer Kim Burgess in the Chicago Fire spin-off Chicago P.D.. The show premiered on January 8, 2014. The seventh season premiered on September 25, 2019 and on February 27, 2020, NBC announced that the show was being renewed for an 8th, 9th and 10th season.

== Personal life ==
Squerciati is married to Eli Kay-Oliphant, an attorney. They have two children, born in 2017 and 2024.

In September 2019, court documents alleged that Squerciati was the child of the late financier John R. Jakobson (who was also the father of actress Maggie Wheeler), and that while she was allegedly promised to be named in the mogul’s will, no provision was made for her. Supporting documents suggest that Jakobson paid for Squerciati's nanny, child support, and Squerciati's tuition at Dalton and Northwestern University.

== Filmography ==
=== Film ===
Year	Title	Role	Notes
1993	The Nutcracker	Mouse / Polichinelle	
2006	Hold		Short film
2009	It's Complicated	Melanie	
2012	Alter Egos	Dr. Sara Bella	
2012	Frances Ha	Waitress at Club	
2013	Sparks	Dawn	
2013	Night Moves	ADR Voice	
2013	Cloudy with a Chance of Meatballs 2	Additional voices	Voice role
2014	A Walk Among the Tombstones	Hostess	Uncredited
2017	Marshall	Stella Friedman	
2017	Central Park	Melissa Shaw	

=== Television ===
Year	Title	Role	Note
2009	Law & Order: Criminal Intent	Betsy Naylor	Episode: "Revolution"
2010	The Good Wife	Cheryl Willens	Episode: "Infamy"
2010	Damages	Young Anne Connel	Episode: "Tell Me I'm Not Racist"
2011	Blue Bloods	Cameron Swanson	Episode: "Model Behavior"
2011, 2015	Law & Order: Special Victims Unit	Annie Meyers / Officer Kim Burgess	Guest role; 2 episodes
2011–2012	Gossip Girl	Alessandra Steele	Recurring role; 8 episodes
2013	The Americans	Irina Semenova	Episode: "Duty and Honor"
2014–present	Chicago P.D.	Officer / Detective Kim Burgess	Main role; 158 episodes
2014–present	Chicago Fire	Officer / Detective Kim Burgess	Guest role; 21 episodes
2015–present	Chicago Med	Officer / Detective Kim Burgess	Guest role; 6 episodes
2017	Chicago Justice	Officer / Detective Kim Burgess	Episode: "Uncertainty Principle"
2017	Special Skills	Marina	Main role; 5 episodes, also writer
