= Red Dead Revolver =

2004 video game

- Developer: Rockstar San Diego
- Publisher: Rockstar Games
- Producer: Stewart Spilkin
- Designer: Josh Needleman-Carlton
- Programmer: Michael Kelley
- Artists: Daren Bader; Joseph Pileski; Carlos Pedroza
- Series: Red Dead
- Platforms: PlayStation 2; Xbox
- Release: NA: May 4, 2004; PAL: June 11, 2004
- Genre: Action-adventure
- Modes: Single-player, multiplayer

Red Dead Revolver is a 2004 action-adventure game developed by Rockstar San Diego and published by Rockstar Games. It is the first entry in the Red Dead series, and was released for the PlayStation 2 and Xbox in May 2004. Set in the 1880s, during the American frontier, the single-player story follows bounty hunter Red Harlow's quest for revenge after the murder of his parents. A local multiplayer mode allows up to four players to face off against each other or AI-controlled bots in free-for-all battles.

Angel Studios began work on Red Dead Revolver with Capcom's funding in 2000. During the development, Angel Studios was acquired and rebranded by Rockstar Games as Rockstar San Diego. After Yoshiki Okamoto left Capcom in 2003, Red Dead Revolver was canceled until Rockstar Games acquired the rights to the game and revived it later that year. The game received mixed reviews from critics and sold moderately well. A successor, Red Dead Redemption, was released in May 2010, and a third game, Red Dead Redemption 2, was released in October 2018, both of which were critically acclaimed.

== Gameplay ==
Red Dead Revolver is a third-person shooter and action-adventure game with a linear storyline. Players can fight enemies using handguns, rifles, shotguns, and throwable weapons such as hunting knives, molotov cocktails, and dynamite. New weapons can be purchased at the end of each level. Levels usually end with a boss fight, and each boss has a bounty on their head that is collected once they are killed. Each level uses a rating system that rewards players with unlockable content, such as new weapons or characters for the game's multiplayer component, depending on how well they completed specific objectives, such as the time taken to finish the level or weapon accuracy.

Though the game lacks an open-world, players may freely explore the small town of Brimstone between levels, where they can interact with NPCs. Throughout the storyline, players mainly assume the role of bounty hunter Red Harlow, but in some levels they get the chance to control other characters, such as English trick-shooter Jack Swift, rancher Annie Stoakes, Renegade Army General Javier Diego, Red's Native American cousin Shadow Wolf, and an African American soldier known only as the "Buffalo Soldier". Each playable character has a unique signature weapon, such as Red's revolver, Jack's twin pistols, and Shadow Wolf's bow and arrow.

A game mechanic introduced in Revolver and later carried over into other Red Dead games is "Dead Eye", a targeting system that temporarily puts the player in slow motion to place one or multiple precise shots on an enemy's body. When the targeting sequence ends, the player character automatically fires to all marked locations in very quick succession, dealing high amounts of damage. Dead Eye is also utilized in the game's duels, which consist of four stages:

- Grabbing – the player controls the character's hand and must direct it towards the weapon.
- Drawing – the player moves the right analog stick back up to remove the weapon from its holster.
- Acquiring locks – the right analog stick is used to move the crosshairs over the opponent's body and place several targets.
- Shooting – once the bullet time effect ends, the player character automatically fires bullets in rapid succession.

The game includes a local multiplayer component, which can be played by one to four players, alongside one to three AI-controlled bots. There are three game modes, mostly free-for-all battles, where the goal is to be the last man standing. The multiplayer component utilizes most maps and character models from the single-player campaign, with only a few exclusive ones. Although the game did not have online multiplayer, Red Dead Revolver was supported on Xbox Live with the "Live Aware" feature. It is now supported on Insignia, a replacement online server for the Xbox.

== Plot ==
In the 1870s, prospectors Nate Harlow (Kurt Rhoads) and Griff (Bert Pence) find gold in an area called Bear Mountain and celebrate by crafting two identical revolvers, each taking one. When Griff is later captured by the Renegade Army, he convinces corrupt army general Javier Diego (Robert Jimenez) to spare his life by offering to show him where the gold is hidden. Diego instructs his right-hand man, Colonel Daren (Dennis Ostermaier), to kill Nate and his family in order to conceal the gold's location. Daren and a band of hired guns murder Nate and his Native American wife, Falling Star (Messeret Stroman), but their teenage son, Red (Jason Fuchs), escapes after shooting off Daren's left arm with his father's revolver, the heat from which burns a scorpion-shaped scar into his hand.

Twelve years later, Red (Robert Bogue) has become a ruthless bounty hunter. After slaughtering a gang of outlaws led by Bloody Tom (Christian Tanno), he takes their bodies to the town of Widows Patch for the bounty on their heads. There, he is ambushed by Ugly Chris (Erick Devine) and his men, who control the town. Red kills the gang with the help of Sheriff O'Grady (Stephen Schnetzer), though the latter is wounded during the shootout. Red takes O'Grady to Brimstone, the nearest town with a doctor, foiling a train robbery on the way there. In Brimstone, Red meets local lawman Sheriff Bartlett (Gene Jones), who offers him several bounties on vicious outlaws plaguing the area. While claiming one such bounty, Red meets and befriends English trick-shootist Jack Swift (Gregg Martin). After being saved by Red, Jack personally guns down his treacherous former employer and his henchmen.

After eliminating all his targets, Red returns to Bartlett, who informs that the wagon train carrying his payment hasn't arrived yet. At the Brimstone Bank, Red overhears local rancher Annie Stoakes (Carrie Keranen) mentioning the gold his parents were killed over. Intrigued, he visits her at her ranch shortly after it is burned on the orders of Governor Griffon as retribution for Annie refusing to sell her property. Red offers to give her all his bounty money once he receives it in exchange for information on Bear Mountain, which Red learns is partially owned by Griffon. Later, at a saloon, Red overhears some thugs talking about Colonel Daren, and winds up killing them in a gunfight when they refuse to tell him more. Bartlett arrests Red, but quickly releases him upon learning he is Nate Harlow's son, and reveals the circumstances surrounding his parents' murder.

Red leaves to exact revenge on Diego, but is captured by Daren after destroying one of their supply trains. While imprisoned and forced to work as a slave mining gold, Red befriends a fellow captive referred to only as the "Buffalo Soldier" (Benton Greene), before the pair are rescued by Red's Native American cousin Shadow Wolf (Chaske Spencer). After escaping from the mines, Red and Shadow Wolf storm Diego's camp and kill Daren, though Shadow Wolf is mortally wounded during the battle. Diego then tries to escape via armored train, but Red chases him down and kills him. Meanwhile, Buffalo Soldier travels to Brimstone to seek Governor Griffon's help, only for the governor to reveal his affiliation with Diego and order Buffalo imprisoned.

Later, Red, Annie, and Jack participate in Brimstone's yearly quick-draw competition, hosted by Griffon and Bartlett. Griffon manipulates the competition to ensure Red is killed, but the latter defeats all his opponents. Enraged, Griffon pulls out his revolver to kill Red himself, but the latter notices the weapon is identical to his own revolver, and deduces Griffon is actually his father's traitorous partner Griff. As Griffon makes his escape, he orders his henchman, Mr. Kelley (Joseph Melendez), to kill Red. After dealing with Kelley, Red storms Griffon's mansion alongside Annie, Jack and Bartlett. After cutting their way through the governor's bodyguards, Jack sacrifices himself to buy Red enough time to kill Griffon in a duel, while Annie finds and rescues Buffalo Soldier. His family finally avenged, Red thanks his allies for their help, and is offered the gold that he is owed by Bartlett, who thanks him for all the good he has done for Brimstone. Honouring his promise to Annie, Red tells the sheriff to give the gold to her and Buffalo Soldier, and leaves with Griffon's revolver, saying that “it was never about the money."

== Development ==
Angel Studios began working on Red Dead Revolver under the oversight and funding of Japanese video game publisher Capcom in 2000. The project stemmed from Angel Studios and Capcom's partnership on the Resident Evil 2 port for the Nintendo 64. Capcom's Yoshiki Okamoto then approached Angel Studios with the idea for an original intellectual property entitled S.W.A.T. It later adopted a Western theme at Okamoto's recommendation, redefining the acronym as "Spaghetti Western Action Team". It is reported that inspiration for that came from Okamoto — who had previously worked on Capcom's 1985 arcade shoot 'em up Gun.Smoke—upon viewing the movie Blindman. Artist Akira Yasuda, also known as Akiman, moved to United States to work on Red Dead Revolver's character design.

Capcom announced the game in March 2002. Its development was troubled, partially due to cultural differences between the two companies, and the game remained unplayable.

In November 2002, Take-Two Interactive, parent company of Rockstar Games, announced that they had acquired Angel Studios, with it being moved to the Rockstar Games label and being renamed Rockstar San Diego. Following the purchase, Rockstar Games executives reviewed projects in development at the studio, so to sort out what was worth keeping. Dan Houser, creative director at Rockstar Games, remarked that the game "looked very good" and caught the review team's eyes, despite it being in an unplayable state. The troubled development led to that unplayable state of the game, with it missing both the 2002 European Computer Trade Show and the 2003 Electronic Entertainment Expo, Okamoto then left Capcom, which eventually cancelled the title in August 2003. However, Rockstar Games acquired the rights to Red Dead Revolver the following December, and let Rockstar San Diego go on to develop what would become the first installment in the acclaimed Red Dead series.

Red Dead Revolver was released for PlayStation 2 and Xbox on May 4, 2004 in North America and on June 11 in PAL regions. The PlayStation 2 version was released on PlayStation 4 on October 11, 2016, and the Xbox version was made available on Xbox One via backward compatibility on November 15, 2021.

== Music ==
The game's soundtrack comprises licensed music from authentic spaghetti westerns. The main title theme is from Luis Bacalov's score for His Name Was King. Other tracks come from A Sky Full of Stars for a Roof (composed by Ennio Morricone), A Bullet for the General, Django, Prepare a Coffin, Minnesota Clay, Have a Good Funeral, My Friend... Sartana Will Pay and many others.

== Reception ==
Reception

Aggregate score
Aggregator	Score	
Aggregator	PS2	Xbox
Metacritic	73/100	74/100

Review scores
Publication	Score	
Publication	PS2	Xbox
1Up.com	C+	C+
Edge	N/A	8/10
Electronic Gaming Monthly	4.83/10	4.83/10
Eurogamer	N/A	6/10
Famitsu	31/40	31/40
Game Informer	8/10	8/10
GamePro	4.5/5	4.5/5
GameRevolution	C−	C−
GameSpot	7.3/10	7.3/10
GameSpy	2/5	2/5
GameZone	7.2/10	7.5/10
IGN	7/10	7.5/10
Official U.S. PlayStation Magazine	4/5	N/A
Official Xbox Magazine (US)	N/A	8.4/10
Entertainment Weekly	C	C
The Times	4/5	4/5

Red Dead Revolver received "mixed or average" reviews according to the review aggregation website Metacritic. In Japan, where the game was published by Capcom later in 2004, almost a year after the company had cancelled the title, Famitsu gave it a score of 31 out of 40.

The Times gave it four stars out of five, saying that it "has a strong, coherent storyline that whisks Red from novice gunslinger to competent bounty hunter in what proves to be the mother of all shooting practice games." Maxim similarly gave it four stars out of five, saying that "Show-offs can even stealthily duck behind cover and shoot at foes' feet to make 'em jig like Michael Flatley sans Ritalin." Entertainment Weekly gave it a C and said that "The game misses its mark: Instead of the gritty, scrub-brush humor of a Sergio Leone pic, Revolver feels like a rootin'-tootin' Disneyland ride." Kevin Gifford of 1Up.com gave the game a C+, saying "The atmosphere in Red Dead is the real thing -- not the pseudo-parody of Dead Man's Hand -- and that alone should satisfy the audience it was made for. If you can forgive all of its faults, you'll enjoy the few hours you spend in Red's world."

It was nominated for GameSpot's 2004 "Best Licensed Music" award, which went to Battlefield: Vietnam. In 2010, the game was included as one of the titles in the book 1001 Video Games You Must Play Before You Die.

=== Sales ===
According to market research firm The NPD Group, Red Dead Revolver sold 140,000 units during June 2004 and had lifetime sales of 920,000 by July 2010.

== Sequels ==
The first glimpse at a sequel was in 2005 when Rockstar showed a teaser at a Sony press conference. The successor to Red Dead Revolver, Red Dead Redemption, was officially announced for PlayStation 3 and Xbox 360 in 2009. After a few delays in release dates, it was finally released on May 18, 2010 in North America, and on May 21, 2010 in Europe and Australia to critical acclaim, with many reviewers praising the game's gameplay and technical improvements over its predecessor.

Red Dead Redemption 2 was confirmed by Rockstar in October 2016, and was released on October 26, 2018 for PlayStation 4 and Xbox One. It was released for Windows on November 5, 2019.
