= Robert Bogue =

American actor (born 1964)

- Born: Robert Timothy Bogue; August 27, 1964 (age 62); Minden, Nebraska, U.S.
- Occupation: Actor
- Years active: 1991–present
- Spouse: Mandy Bruno (m. 2011)
- Children: 3

Robert Timothy Bogue (born August 27, 1964) is an American actor who played A.C. Mallet on Guiding Light from 2005 until the soap's ending in 2009. He also plays FIB Agent Steve Haines in Grand Theft Auto V in 2013 and main protagonist Red Harlow in Red Dead Revolver in 2004.

== Biography ==
Born in Minden, Nebraska as the youngest of three brothers, Bogue was raised in Hays, Kansas and Richmond, Kentucky. He graduated Phi Beta Kappa from Colorado College with a degree in International Political Economics. He was an original founding member of the New Group Theater Company. Bogue also voiced Red Harlow in the video games Red Dead Revolver and Red Dead Redemption, Troy in Grand Theft Auto: The Ballad of Gay Tony, and Steve Haines in Grand Theft Auto V.

== Personal life ==
He has two children from his first marriage: a son Zebulon Jeremiah, born in 2003 and a daughter Zoë Chinook, born in 2004. On March 26, 2011, he married his Guiding Light co-star Mandy Bruno. They have one child together, a son, Flynn Zachariah, born in 2012. He holds a third degree black belt in "Traditional" Tae Kwon Do.

== Filmography ==
=== Film ===
Year	Title	Role	Notes
1993	Manhattan by Numbers	Aldy	
1996	Vibrations	Gabe	Video
1996	True Blue	Jeff Chambers	
1997	The Definite Maybe	Ted	
1999	24 Nights	Stan	
1999	Not Afraid to Say...	Alex	
2000	In the Weeds	Tom	
2000	Rattler	Rusty	Short
2002	Matthew Blackheart: Monster Smasher	Matthew Blackheart	TV movie
2002	Spinster	Daddy Warbucks	Short
2002	Heartbreak Hospital	Scoop Rodgers	
2005	The Exonerated	Doyle	TV movie
2005	Backseat	Ben	
2006	5up 2down	Claude	
2008	Frost	Russell	
2008	The Dissection of Thanksgiving	Ed Spade	
2010	The Good Guy	Johnny	
2012	Modern Love	Henry Caldwell	TV movie
2013	Sleeping with the Fishes	Freddy Fine	
2014	Lullaby	Steven Lavipour	
2014	Scavenger Killers	Judge Taylor Limone	
2015	Bleeding Hearts	Gary Granite	
2015	Creative Control	The Actor	
2015	Old 37	Detective Higgins	
2015	#Lucky Number	Vance Avery	
2015	Rock Story	Mario Cash	
2016	Joker's Wild	Congressman Arthur Butler	
2016	The O2	Franklin	Short
2018	Price for Freedom	Ronald Reagan	
2019	The MisEducation of Bindu	Principal Schroeder	
2020	Across the Pacific	Bill Grooch	
2021	Naked Singularity	Detective Coburn	
2021	En Suite	Mr.	Short
2021	Project Pay Day	Adam	

=== Television ===
Year	Title	Role	Notes
1991	Another World	Trent	Episode: "Episode #1.6741" & "#1.6742"
1992	Loving	Billy	Episode: "Episode #1.2197"
1993	As the World Turns	Kevin Williams	Episode: "Episode #1.9412" & "#1.9415"
1998	Sins of the City	Rodney Strong	Episode: "Do You Wanna Know a Secret"
1998	Trinity	Caleb Trevor	Episode: "In Loco Parentis"
1999	Sex and the City	Paul Ericson	Episode: "Take Me Out to the Ball Game"
1999	Touched by an Angel	Milton	Episode: "The Occupant"
1999	Guiding Light	Lt Burrell	Episode: "Episode #47.205"
1999–2000	Oz	Jason Cramer	Supporting cast: season 3–4
2000	Third Watch	Roger	Episode: "Just Another Night at the Opera"
2001	The Sopranos	Ed Restuccia	Episode: "Mr. Ruggerio's Neighborhood"
2002	The Education of Max Bickford	Ron McClain	Episode: "The Good, the Bad, and the Lawyers" & "The Cost of Living"
2002	Ed	Cliff Troobie	Episode: "The Shot"
2002	Law & Order: Special Victims Unit	Kevin Wilson	Episode: "Surveillance"
2004	Whoopi	Carl	Episode: "No Sex in the City"
2005–09	Guiding Light	Anthony "Mallet" Camalletti	Main cast
2007	The Gamekillers	Narrator	Episode: "Kyle and Emily"
2008	All's Faire	Sir Robert	TV series
2012	Blue Bloods	Parker	Episode: "Whistle Blower"
2013	The Americans	Cal	Episode: "Trust Me"
2013	Law & Order: Special Victims Unit	Jason Hollis	Episode: "Legitimate Rape"
2013	The Following	Daniel Monroe	Episode: "The Curse"
2013	Unforgettable	Todd Blasingame	Episode: "Memory Kings"
2014	Wallflowers	Fred	Recurring cast: season 2
2016	NASCAR: The Rise of American Speed	Narrator	TV mini series Documentary
2017	Homeland	ESU Captain Wilson	Episode: "Casus Belli"
2017	Bull	Gov. Dean Whitfield	Episode: "Free Fall"
2018	House of Cards	Claire Underwood's Father	Episode: "Chapter 67"
2020	Chicago Fire	Captain Greg Delaney	Episode: "Hold Our Ground" & "Where We End Up"

=== Video games ===
Year	Title	Role	Notes
2004	Red Dead Revolver	Red Harlow	Voice
2009	Grand Theft Auto: The Ballad of Gay Tony	Troy	Voice and motion-capture
2010	Red Dead Redemption	Red Harlow	Voice
2013	Grand Theft Auto V	Steve Haines	Voice and motion-capture
Unreleased	Star Wars 1313	The Mentor	
