= Only You (The Americans) =

- The Americans episode
- Episode no.: Season 1 Episode 10
- Directed by: Adam Arkin
- Written by: Bradford Winters
- Cinematography by: Richard Rutkowski
- Editing by: Amanda Pollack
- Production code: BDU109
- Original air date: April 10, 2013
- Running time: 46 minutes

Guest appearances
- Derek Luke as Gregory Thomas; Richard Thomas as Frank Gaad; Annet Mahendru as Nina; Susan Misner as Sandra Beeman; Alison Wright as Martha Hanson; Lev Gorn as Arkady Ivanovich; Margo Martindale as Claudia

Episode chronology
← Previous "Safe House"	Next → "Covert War"
- The Americans season 1

"Only You" is the tenth episode of the first season of the American period spy drama television series The Americans. The episode was written by Bradford Winters, and directed by Adam Arkin. It was released on FX on April 10, 2013.

The series is set during the Cold War and follows Elizabeth and Philip Jennings, two Soviet KGB intelligence officers posing as an American married couple living in Falls Church, a Virginia suburb of Washington, D.C., with their American-born children Paige and Henry. It also explores the conflict between Washington's FBI office and the KGB Rezidentura there, from the perspectives of agents on both sides, including the Jennings' neighbor Stan Beeman, an FBI agent working in counterintelligence. In the episode, the FBI searches for Amador's killer, while Philip and Elizabeth discover Gregory could be tracked.

According to Nielsen Media Research, the episode was seen by an estimated 1.50 million household viewers and gained a 0.6 ratings share among adults aged 18–49. The episode received extremely positive reviews from critics, who praised the resolution to Gregory's arc.

== Plot ==
At his motel room, Philip (Matthew Rhys) is visited by Stan (Noah Emmerich), still shaken over Amador's death. Stan plans to find the person responsible, while the FBI is trying to find Amador's ring, which was missing from his body. Stan also hides his involvement in Vlad's death from Nina (Annet Mahendru).

Philip tells Elizabeth (Keri Russell) that Amador's ring was missing, which is later found by the FBI at a pawn shop where the car was placed. Finding that Amador purposely left the ring so that the FBI could find him, Stan confronts the owner in identifying the people who left the car. The owner finally admits that African-American criminals left the car, and that it wasn't the first time they did it. Through mug shots, the owner finally recognizes one of the men as Curtis, an associate of Gregory (Derek Luke). Stan recognizes the man as the person who was following him and Amador in Philadelphia.

The FBI arrests Curtis and Stan threatens to have him charged with treason unless he reveals information. Claudia (Margo Martindale) informs Philip and Elizabeth about the situation, telling them that Gregory will have to be exfiltrated to Moscow as the FBI will eventually make the connection. Claudia visits Gregory to explain his options, as his ongoing presence in America could jeopardize things for Philip and Elizabeth. She also reveals that the KGB has decided to plant evidence at his apartment, which will frame him as Amador's killer. With no other option, Gregory decides to follow her instructions. He is placed in a safe house, where he is visited by Elizabeth that night. He professes his love for her and they have sex.

The following day, Gregory tells Elizabeth that he has chosen not to go to Moscow. As Philip arrives to kill Gregory, the latter explains he will die through suicide by cop. Elizabeth convinces Philip in allowing Gregory to do it, and she has a last kiss with Gregory before leaving the house. Gregory is detected on the street by police officers and is shot to death when he incites a gunfight. Stan is relieved when he is informed of the news, while Elizabeth is distraught when she sees the news report of Gregory's death on TV.

== Production ==
=== Development ===
In March 2013, FX confirmed that the tenth episode of the series would be titled "Only You", and that it would be written by Bradford Winters, and directed by Adam Arkin. This was Winters' first writing credit, and Arkin's second directing credit.

== Reception ==
=== Viewers ===
In its original American broadcast, "Only You" was seen by an estimated 1.50 million household viewers with a 0.6 in the 18–49 demographics. This means that 0.6 percent of all households with televisions watched the episode. This was a 8% increase in viewership from the previous episode, which was watched by 1.38 million household viewers with a 0.6 in the 18–49 demographics.

=== Critical reviews ===
"Only You" received extremely positive reviews from critics. Eric Goldman of IGN gave the episode a "great" 8.2 out of 10 and wrote, "Stan's interrogation scene with Gregory's man, Curtis, was very good, as he appealed to the fact that this man may be a criminal, but he's a fellow American – and was unaware of who he was really working for. Yes, by the end of the episode, Gregory was dead, but I'm guessing Stan will not be completely satisfied that the one and only man behind his best friend's death has been dealt with."

Emily St. James of The A.V. Club gave the episode an "A–" grade and wrote, "By taking its time, 'Only You' makes its final act all the more devastating. For the first half of the episode, I was engaged, but I was also wondering just why the episode was taking its sweet time when shit should be blowing up or something. Then, as the episode spiraled downward into that talky scene in the safe house apartment, a scene that often seemed as if it were filmed through a gauze made of molasses (I mean this as a compliment), I realized that this was the point."

Alan Sepinwall of HitFix wrote, "It's a pretty well-oiled machine by now, and 'Only You' was another brisk, brutal, effective outing for The Americans." Matt Zoller Seitz of Vulture gave the episode a perfect 5 star rating out of 5 and wrote, "'Only You' feels like a sequel, or at least a bookend, to 'Gregory,' killing off one of the show's most memorable characters, Derek Luke's Gregory in a lyrically violent set piece preceded by an emotionally wrenching buildup."

Vicky Frost of The Guardian wrote, "This week's Americans was an interesting meditation on love: why we care for someone, what we'll do for them or the thing we hold dearest; the pain it can cause; what makes it real." Carla Day of TV Fanatic gave the episode a 4.8 star rating out of 5 and wrote, "As much as The Americans is about the spy game during the Cold War, it's not about the nuts and bolts of that life, instead it's about the human cost. 'Only You' showed the investigation into Amador's death and how the culprit was both staged and caught, but that was just the framework of the story."
