= St. Frederick High School (Monroe, Louisiana) =

Location
- 3300 Westminster Avenue; Monroe, (Ouachita Parish), Louisiana 71201; United States; 32°32′12″N 92°5′20″W

Information
- Type: Private
- Religious affiliation: Roman Catholic
- Established: 1964
- Principal: Carynn Wiggins
- Grades: 7–12
- Gender: Coeducational
- Language: English
- Hours in school day: 8
- Colors: Royal Blue, white, and black
- Sports: Football, Baseball, Softball, Basketball, Soccer, Swimming, Golf, Tennis, Track/Field, Cross Country
- Mascot: Warrior
- Team name: Warriors
- Rival: Ouachita Christian High School
- Accreditation: Southern Association of Colleges and Schools
- Website: www.stfrederickhigh.org

St. Frederick High School is a private, Catholic high school in Monroe, Louisiana. The school was established in 1964 by the Daughters of the Cross and named in honor of Rae Frederick Rinehart Jr., whose family donated the land the school is located on.

Today, St. Frederick is a college prep school serving grades 7–12.

== Athletics ==
St. Frederick High athletics competes in the LHSAA.

== Notable alumni ==
- Chase Coleman, actor

== Notable faculty ==
- Roger Carr, former professional football player, football coach from 2003 to 2005
