= Chase Coleman =

American actor, director, and musician

- Chase Coleman attends a red carpet event in 2017
- Born: March 20, 1985 (age 41); Tuscaloosa, Alabama, U.S.
- Education: University of Louisiana at Monroe
- Occupations: Actor; director; and musician
- Years active: 2005–present

Chase Coleman (born March 20, 1985) is an American actor, director, and musician. Coleman portrayed the character of Billy Winslow in the HBO TV series Boardwalk Empire and the werewolf Oliver on the CW spin-off series The Originals.

== Early life ==
Chase Coleman was born in Tuscaloosa, Alabama, and raised in Monroe, Louisiana. He attended Grace Episcopal School for elementary and junior high education and graduated from St. Frederick Catholic High School. During his second year of high school, he became the lead singer of Crawl Space, a local Monroe rock band until graduation.

After high school, Coleman attended the University of Louisiana at Monroe, pursuing a degree in Business Marketing. While there, he played in a hard rock band called, Fallstaff. However, not long after starting college, Coleman became interested in acting. He began performing with the Straus Community Theater and the Theater of the University of Louisiana at Monroe. During his junior year of college, he signed with the Baton Rouge Agency, Stage 2000, after being recruited by Ron Randell.

== Career ==
=== Acting ===
Coleman was invited to Dallas to compete at the Mike Beaty Model and Talent Expo. It was there that Chase won several awards including best monologue and overall fitness model. He was then discovered by talent manager Suzanne Schachter and was invited to go to New York City to test the market for the summer. While in New York, Coleman was offered the role of Garrett on the popular daytime soap opera One Life to Live. Not long after landing that role, he received many offers to remain in New York City for professional acting work, shifting to online courses in order to finish his degree. In 2006, he signed with the company Suzelle Enterprises and Abrams Artists Agency through Paul Reisman. During his time in New York, he studied at the HB Studio with Lorraine Serabien, with Susan Batson at Black Nexxus, and with Jennifer Gelfer at the Haymarket Annex Master Class.

One of Coleman's most recognized roles is the portrayal of Billy Winslow in Season 1 of Boardwalk Empire, as well as guest starring on The Good Wife, Gossip Girl, Law & Order: Criminal Intent, and Kings. He has had many starring and supporting roles in numerous independent films such as New York City Serenade, Catahoula, One Night Stand, Halloween Season, Grill Check, God Don’t Make the Laws, The Halls of Montezuma, Warehouse Rumble, Mama, 8:46, Roses, Cloak and Dagger, The J Packages, Pop Up, and Love Hunter. He also played the lead of Andrew in the off-Broadway play My Big Gay Italian Wedding.

In 2010, Coleman won the Screen Actors Guild Award for "Outstanding Performance by an Ensemble in a Drama Series," for his role on Boardwalk Empire. He was then cast as Dr. Dane Sullivan in the web series In Between Men. It was this role that got Coleman nominated for an Indie Soap Award for "Best Supporting Actor in a Drama," in 2011.

Coleman founded the production company Bloodstone Productions and created the short film Into the Rose Garden that he wrote, directed, and starred in. Then, in the summer of 2012, he guest starred as Robert in the pilot of the TV series The Americans, as well as worked on filming Season 2 of In Between Men in autumn of the same year.

In 2014, Coleman was cast as the werewolf Oliver on the hit TV show The Originals, the popular spin-off show of The Vampire Diaries. His role as Oliver spanned a total of twelve episodes between Season 1 and Season 2 of the series.

After his role of Oliver, Coleman went on to work on more independent films like Recorded Lives, Justice Served, Heaven's Renegade Angel, The Viking and the Pendulum, The Return, and Life's Too Short, to name a few.

Later in 2016, Coleman landed a guest-starring role on the NBC series Aquarius as Terry Melcher, a character that spanned three episodes.

Currently, Coleman is appearing globally at several fan conventions developed for The Vampire Diaries and The Originals, both as a guest star and musician.

=== Music ===
During his pursuit of expanding his acting career, music follows close behind. In 2014, while guest-starring in the fan convention circuit, Coleman began playing music acoustically for the audience; he covered mainstream music as well as singing original songs he had written.

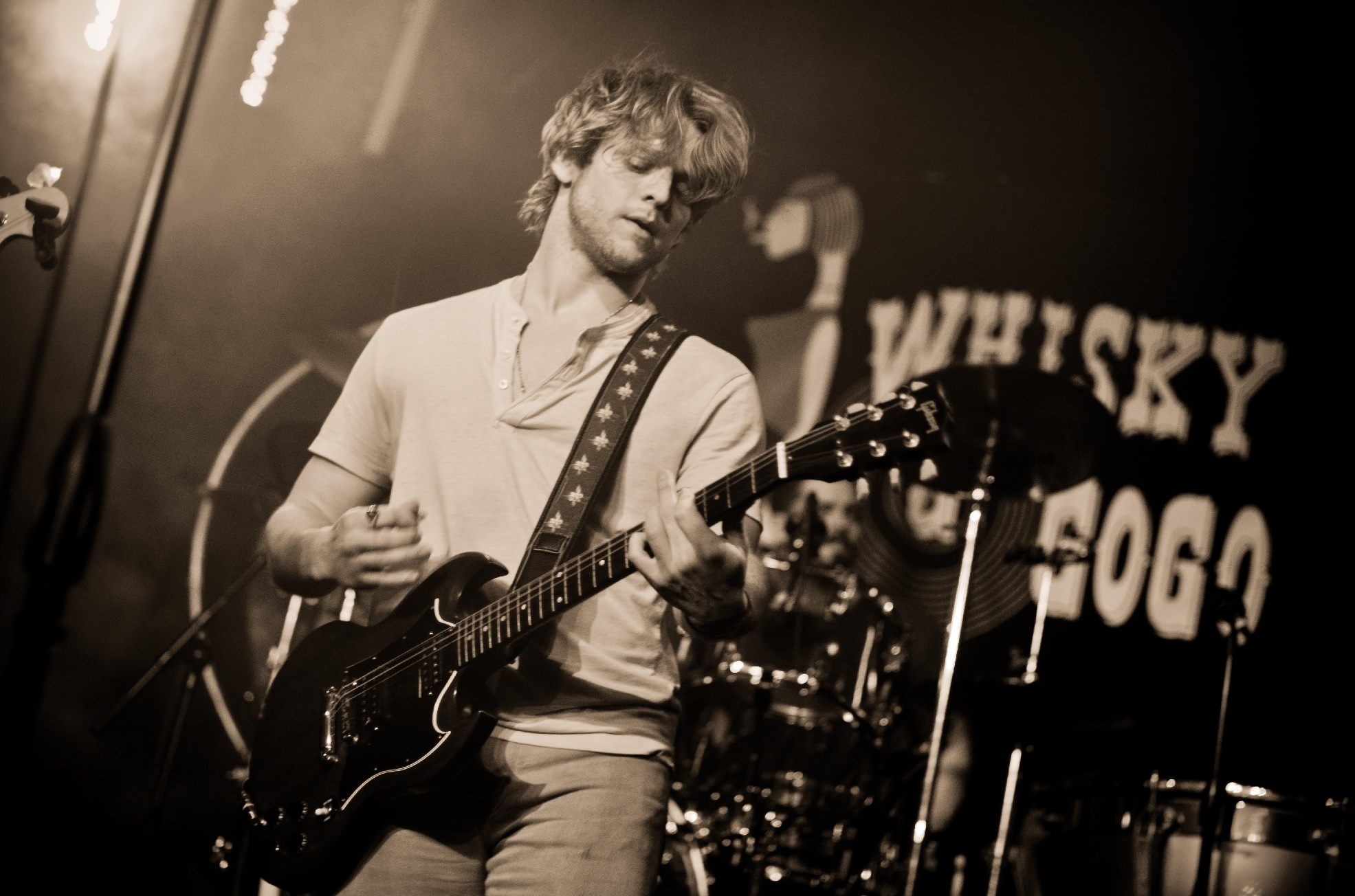
Mercy Mode performs at Whisky A Go Go in Hollywood.

In January 2017, Coleman, along with friends Chris Weaver and Micah Parker, formed the band Mercy Mode. Their first single, "Take It All," was released on March 15, 2017, and is available on iTunes, Spotify, Amazon, and Google Play.

== Filmography ==
=== Actor ===
Year	Title	Role
2006	Scarlett	Party-goer
2006	One Life to Live	Garrett
2007	False Hope	Code Blue Responder 1
2007	New York City Serenade	Jock 1
2007	Gossip Girl	Jack Altman 1 episode
2007	Law & Order: Criminal Intent	Brad Barrett
2008	Catahoula	Jason Dunn
2009	Kings	Daniel Shepherd
2009	The Good Wife	Brian Keller
2010	One Night Stand	Date Rapist
2010	Halloween Season	Bill
2010	Boardwalk Empire	Billy Winslow Guest Star
2011	Grill Check	Mickey
2011	God Don't Make the Laws	Brett Armstrong
2011	The Halls of Montezuma	Victor
2011	In Between Men	Dr. Dane Sullivan
2011	Warehouse Rumble	Blade Strongood
2011	Mama	Joe
2011	8:46	Kyle Foster
2012	Roses	Teenager
2012	Cloak and Dagger	Adam Larkin
2012	The J Packages	Todd
2012	Into the Rose Garden	Joseph
2013	The Americans	Robert
2013	Pop Up	Ryan
2014	Love Hunter	Tom
2014	The Originals	Oliver
2014	Recorded Lives	Tadd's brother
2015	Justice Served	Luke Palmer
2015	Gypsi	Declan Desmonde
2015	Heaven's Renegade Angel	Toby
2015	The Viking and the Pendulum	Varg
2015	S(he) Said	Man
2015	Eye of the Beholder	Eliae
2016	The Return	Apollo
2016	Life's Too Short	Man
2016	Aquarius	Terry Melcher
2016	Noches Con Platanito	Multiple Roles
2016	Apocalypse: The Drunk	The Drunk
2016	Outlaw Origins	Twisted Fate
2016	I Hate Your Laugh!	Dillon
2017	The Time Capsule	Derek
2017	You. Me. Us?	Harry
2017	The Land	Scottie Taylor
2017	Panacea	Nick
2018	Trauma Therapy	Matt
2018	Tales	TBA
2018	First Born	Gun Guy
TBA	Misfit	Aaron
TBA	Family Dinner	Charlie
TBA	A Night at the Studio	Buddy

=== Director ===
Year	Title	Role
2012	Into the Rose Garden	Joseph

=== Writer ===
Year	Title	Role
2012	Into the Rose Garden	Joseph

=== Stage ===
Year	Title	Role
2011	My Big Gay Italian Wedding	Andrew
2012	Four Dogs and a Bone	Victor

== Awards and nominations ==
Year	Award	Nominated work	Result
2010	Screen Actors Guild Awards Outstanding Performance by an Ensemble in a Drama Series	Boardwalk Empire	Won
2011	Indie Soap Awards Best Supporting Actor in a Drama	In Between Men	Nominated
