= The Clock (The Americans) =

- The Americans episode
- Episode no.: Season 1 Episode 2
- Directed by: Adam Arkin
- Written by: Joe Weisberg
- Production code: BDU101
- Original air date: February 6, 2013
- Running time: 49 minutes

Guest appearances
- Richard Thomas as Frank Gaad; Annet Mahendru as Nina; Tonye Patano as Viola Johnson; Meg Gibson as Mrs. Weinberger; Peter Von Berg as Vasili Nikolaevich; Lev Gorn as Arkady Ivanovich; Anthony Arkin as Stavos; Vitaly Benko as Vlad; Gillian Alexy as Celia Gerard / Annelise; James Andrew O'Connor as Clark; Grantham Coleman as Grayson; Marisa Redanty as Barb; David Lomax as Albert; Mark Zeisler as Deputy Undersecretary of Defense; Alice Spivak as Miss Radensky

Episode chronology
| ← Previous "Pilot" | Next → "Gregory" |
- The Americans season 1

"The Clock" is the second episode of the first season of the period drama television series The Americans. It originally aired on FX in the United States on February 6, 2013.

== Plot ==
Philip Jennings (Matthew Rhys) poses as a Swedish Intelligence Officer named Scott Birkeland at a cocktail party. He seduces Celia Gerard a.k.a. Annelise (Gillian Alexy), the wife of an assistant undersecretary in the U.S. Department of Defense. Philip persuades her to take photos of the study in the home of United States Secretary of Defense Caspar Weinberger, when she is at the Weinbergers' party, so that the KGB can identify where they could plant a listening device. Annelise takes the photos in Weinberger's study by strapping a camera to her bra. Later, Philip and Elizabeth (Keri Russell) develop the photos in a darkroom and notice a clock in the study that can be bugged. Elizabeth teases Philip for how attractive his agent Annelise is.

Stan Beeman (Noah Emmerich) and Chris Amador (Maximiliano Hernández) are watching a stereo store where Nina (Annet Mahendru), a woman working for the Soviet Embassy in Washington, enters and then leaves quickly with a large package. Stan and Chris confront the stereo store owner about her identity, and Chris finds a tin of Beluga caviar behind the counter.

Meanwhile, at the Soviet embassy, two men discuss the upcoming visit to the U.S. by Margaret Thatcher and John Nott, with intelligence that they are visiting Weinberger. Philip and Elizabeth are given three days to return to Weinberger's to plant the bug. Elizabeth, disguised, poisons a young college student named Grayson by injecting him with a needle attached to the end of an umbrella. Philip and Elizabeth go to the college student's house to see his mother, Viola Johnson (Tonye Patano), Weinberger's maid, and tell her that, if she brings them the clock located in Weinberger's office, they will give her son the antidote. Viola complies, reluctantly, and steals the clock.

Philip shows up at her house later, but is attacked by Viola's brother. Philip beats him in their ensuing fight, where he warns Viola to speak of this to nobody. Elizabeth becomes concerned about the success of the mission and how it will affect the children. Philip learns that Viola hasn't set up the clock in the office. Philip goes to Viola's home and tells her that her faith in God will not save her son. Philip begins to smother Grayson with a pillow, which convinces Viola to finish the job.

Stan finds Nina, telling her he knows that she's sending high-priced U.S. stereo equipment back to the Soviet Union; he blackmails her into spying on the Russians for the FBI.

The Russians listen to the meeting between Weinberger and Nott, who discuss building a missile shield.

== Production ==
The episode was written by series creator Joe Weisberg and directed by Adam Arkin.

== Reception ==
In its original American broadcast, "The Clock" was seen by an estimated 1.97 million household viewers and gained a 0.8 ratings share among adults aged 18–49, according to Nielsen Media Research. The episode dropped four tenths from the pilot episode.

Genevieve Koski and Emily VanDerWerff from The A.V. Club gave The Clock an A−, saying "The Americans is far from the first dramatic series to ask its audience to root for an antihero, or even a villain, though it might be the only one to ask us to root for characters who are actively working to destroy the collective 'us' of American society." Continuing: "as this week's episode demonstrates, the answer to why we should root for these characters who are technically the 'them' to our 'us' becomes much simpler: It's damn hard not to root for the success of a well-executed caper story."
