= Daniel Flaherty =

American actor (born 1993)

Daniel L Flaherty
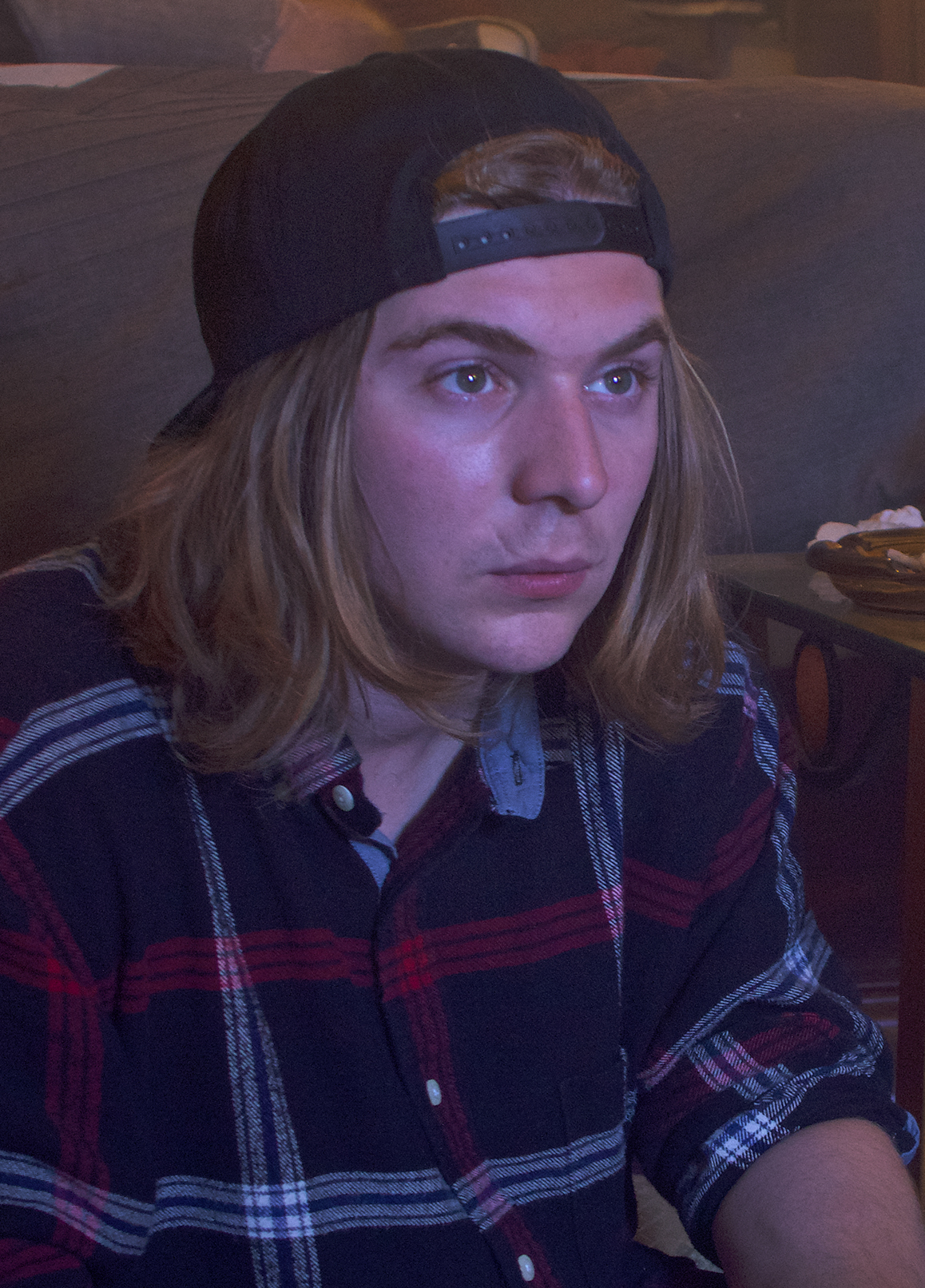
- Daniel Flaherty during filming of The Garden Left Behind in September 2016
- Born: June 11, 1993 (age 33); Glen Rock, New Jersey, US
- Occupation: Actor
- Years active: 2005–present

Daniel Flaherty (born June 11, 1993) is an American actor, known for his role as Stanley Lucerne on the MTV teen drama series Skins.

== Life and career ==
Flaherty started to pursue acting at age 11. When he turned 13, he booked his first short film, My First Kiss. By the age of 17, he had appeared in the indie short films Spark, Vacant, The Parade, and Portnoy.

In 2010, Flaherty was cast as Stanley Lucerne in the MTV adaptation of the British teen drama Skins. The character is based on the character Sid Jenkins from the original British series. Daniel originally went to the New York open call but didn’t get a callback. His agent arranged a second private audition, through which Flaherty won the role. Flaherty stated that his favorite part of working on Skins was getting to contribute to the development of his character. In 2012, Flaherty was cast as Tommy, a victim of school bullying, in the independent dramedy Contest. The following year, he appeared in a small role in Martin Scorsese's The Wolf of Wall Street. Beginning in 2013, he had a recurring role in the television series “The Americans” as Matthew Beeman, the teenage son next door. In September 2016, it was announced that Flaherty would join the cast of the upcoming film, The Garden Left Behind, directed by Flavio Alves, starring Michael Madsen and Ed Asner.

== Personal life ==
Flaherty is from Glen Rock, New Jersey, where he attended Glen Rock High School. He is the youngest of four siblings. He spends his free time skateboarding, playing guitar, writing songs, and singing in his band, MF Killer Starfish.

== Filmography ==
=== Film ===
Year	Title	Role	Notes
2005	My First Kiss	Danny Flaherty	Short film
2008	Chords	Plugger #1	Short film
2010	Take Out	Unknown	Short film
2010	Spark	Unknown	Short film
2012	Ice Age: Continental Drift	Additional voices	
2012	Hope Springs	Danny, the bookstore clerk	
2013	Parklife	Ian	Short film
2013	Paradise	Teenage guy	
2013	Seldom Sunday	Theo	Short film
2013	Contest	Tommy Dolen	
2013	The Wolf of Wall Street	Zip (lude-buying teenager #1)	
2014	Hits	Christian	
2014	Annie	Chase teen	
2015	The Adderall Diaries	Teenage Roger	
2015	King Jack	Shane	
2015	Naomi and Ely's No Kiss List	Boy-Robin	
2015	Anatomy of the Tide	Trent Page	
2016	The Eyes	Jeffrey	
2016	Goat	Will	
2016	The Transfiguration	Mike	
2016	Alone	Luke	
2017	November Criminals	Noel	
2017	The Meyerowitz Stories	Marcus	
2018	The Garden Left Behind	Oscar	
2020	The Trial of the Chicago 7	John Froines	

=== Television ===
Year	Title	Role	Notes
2011	Skins	Stanley Lucerne	Main cast; 10 episodes
2011	Law & Order: Criminal Intent	Taylor Brite	Episode: "Rispetto"
2011	Unforgettable	JJ Clayburn	Episode: "Trajectories"
2013–2017	The Americans	Matthew Beeman	Recurring role
2013	Nurse Jackie	Danny	4 episodes
2014	The Leftovers	Max	3 episodes
2015	Eye Candy	Max	Episode: "YOLO"
2016	The Night Of	Copy store clerk	Miniseries; episode: "Ordinary Death"
2018	The Deuce	Outside writer	Episode: "What Big Ideas"
2021	Chicago Med	Neil Dietrich	2 episodes
