= Susan Misner =

American actress and dancer (born 1971)

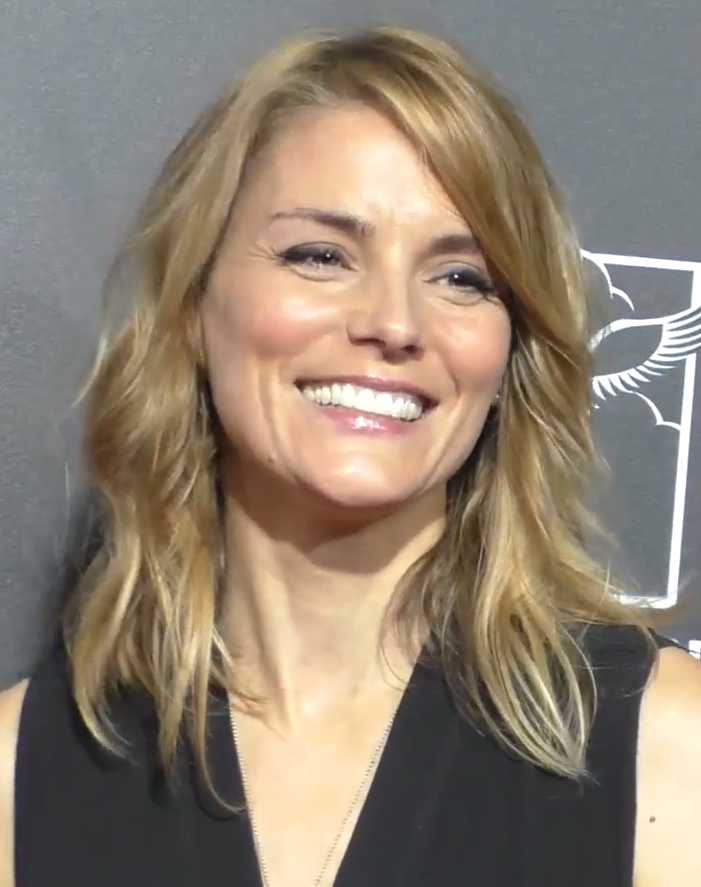
- Misner in 2016
- Born: February 8, 1971 (age 55); Paterson, New Jersey, U.S.
- Occupations: Actress; dancer
- Years active: 1996–present

Susan Misner (/ˈmɪsnər/; born February 8, 1971) is an American actress and dancer. She has appeared in a number of TV series as a guest star, as well as several recurring roles.

== Early years ==
Misner was born on February 8, 1971, in Paterson, New Jersey. Misner grew up in the Pompton Plains section of Pequannock Township, New Jersey. She attended Pequannock Township High School and participated in a semi-professional dance troupe after school hours. She later enrolled in acting classes, having read that Bob Fosse believed that “being an actor would make you a better dancer, to find a way to tell stories”.

== Career ==
Misner started her career as a dancer on Broadway, appearing in four musicals, starting with a production of Guys and Dolls from 1992 to 1995, and including a role as Geminae in a production of A Funny Thing Happened on the Way to the Forum from 1996 to 1998.

During her time on Broadway, she appeared in two movies, with a role in the direct-to-video Cyber Vengeance (1995) and one of the dancers in the Woody Allen musical Everyone Says I Love You (1996). She started focusing on acting in 1999, portraying Grace Davidson on the ABC soap opera One Life to Live for a nine month run ending on November 17, 1999. In 2002, Misner appeared in the film Chicago as Liz, performing in the "Cell Block Tango" number.

Misner has guest starred on many TV series, including three of the series in the Law & Order franchise – Law & Order: Criminal Intent (2001, 2005), Law & Order: Special Victims Unit (2002) and Law & Order (2006) – as well as both CSI: Crime Scene Investigation (2002) and CSI: Miami (2004). She appeared as Theresa on Rescue Me (2006–07), and later as Gretchen Martin in the 2007 miniseries The Bronx Is Burning. She appeared in two episodes of the procedural Without a Trace during the 2004–2005 television season. Misner appeared in brief flashbacks as Jessica, the ex-girlfriend of Jim Caviezel's lead character, in five episodes of the first season (2011) of Person of Interest. She guest starred as Alison Humphrey in a four-episode arc of Gossip Girl, and a four-episode arc as Sergeant Burnett in New Amsterdam (2008).

Starting in 2013, she portrayed Sandra Beeman in The Americans, in the main cast for two seasons and a recurring role for two others. Following her work on The Americans, she has more consistently appeared in lengthy runs on TV series, including the main character Dr. Nora White in Shut Eye and recurring roles in two seasons (2016, 2018) of Billions, season 2 (2019) of Jack Ryan, and season 6 (2024–25) of FBI: Most Wanted.

Misner returned to theatre in 2014, as co-creator, choreographer and actor in the play The Shape She Makes, staged at the Oberon in Cambridge, Massachusetts.

== Personal life ==
She has been in a relationship with playwright and director Jonathan Bernstein since 1999.

== Filmography ==
=== Film ===
Year	Title	Role	Notes
1995	Cyber Vengeance	Tory	Direct-to-video
1996	Everyone Says I Love You	Harry Winston Dancer	
2000	The Fanatical Teachings of Julian Tau	Susan	Short film
2001	Queenie in Love	Chick	
2002	Pipe Dream	Onica	
2002	Chicago	Liz	
2003	Something's Gotta Give	Harry's Old Flame	
2004	The Forgotten	Agent Lisa Franks	
2005	Alchemy	Associate Editor	
2005	Walking on the Sky	Sara	
2006	Mentor	Marilyn Conner	
2006	The Hoax	Feral Girl #1	
2006	Two Weeks	Sherry	
2007	If I Didn't Care	Hadley Templeton	credited as Susie Misner
2008	Stick It in Detroit	Lisa Brooks	
2008	Eavesdrop	Bette	
2008	Jumping In	Bartender	Short film
2008	The Drum Beats Twice	Mary	
2008	Gigantic	Melanie Lolly	
2009	Once More with Feeling	Theresa	
2009	Cayman Went	Darby Thomas	
2009	Tanner Hall	Roxanne	credited as Susie Misner
2011	Somebody's Hero	Katie Wells	
2011	Henley	Sara	Short film
2012	Hope Springs	Dana	
2016	Being Charlie	Lisanne	
2018	Assassination Nation	Rose Mathers	credited as Susie Misner
2018	Summer Days, Summer Nights	Claudia Mckenna	
2024	Homestead	Evie McNulty	

=== Television ===
Year	Title	Role	Notes
1997	Soul Man	Dept. Store Woman	Episode: "Christmas Ruined My Life"
1999	One Life to Live	Grace Davidson Buchanan	
2000	Ed	Female Teacher	Episode: "Better Days"
2001	Sex and the City	Shayna	Episode: "Time and Punishment" (credited as Susie Misner)
2001	Law & Order: Criminal Intent	Becky Stark	Episode: "Smothered"
2002	CSI: Crime Scene Investigation	Cassie James	Episode: "The Hunger Artist"
2002	Law & Order: Special Victims Unit	Ronnie Marshall	Episode: "Dolls"
2004	CSI: Miami	Heddy Latham	Episode: "Not Landing"
2004	Without a Trace	Jessie Prince	Episode: "The Line"
2005	Without a Trace	Helen / Hope	Episode: "John Michaels"
2005	Jonny Zero	Eve	Recurring role
2005	Law & Order: Criminal Intent	Sister Olivia	Episode: "Acts of Contrition"
2005	Starved	Alison	Recurring role
2005	Night Stalker	Irene	2 episodes
2006	Conviction	Alexis Bennet	2 episodes
2006	Vanished	Nadia Sands	2 episodes
2006	Law & Order	Samantha Weaver	Episode: "Corner Office"
2006–07	Rescue Me	Theresa	6 episodes
2007	The Kill Point	Lorna Ash	Episode: "No Meringue" (credited as Susie Misner)
2007	The Bronx Is Burning	Gretchen Martin	Miniseries, 3 episodes
2007	Gossip Girl	Alison Humphrey	4 episodes (credited as Susie Misner)
2008	New Amsterdam	Callie Burnett	Recurring role
2008	Life on Mars	Carol Ann Reeves	Episode: "My Maharishi Is Bigger Than Your Maharishi"
2008	Fringe	Tess Amaral	Episode: "The Dreamscape"
2009	Law & Order: Criminal Intent	Mary Devildis	Episode: "Family Values"
2009	Royal Pains	Claire Grant	Episode: "No Man Is an Island"
2009	White Collar	Dana Mitchell	Episode: "Flip of the Coin"
2010	NCIS	Leah Mayne	Episode: "Double Identity"
2010	In Treatment	Wendy	2 episodes
2011–15	The Good Wife	Simone Canning	4 episodes
2011–12	Person of Interest	Jessica Arndt	Recurring role (season 1)
2012	I Just Want My Pants Back	Gwen	2 episodes
2012	40	Stacy	TV movie
2013–16	The Americans	Sandra Beeman	Recurring role
2013	Blue Bloods	Karen Waters	Episode: "Men in Black"
2013	The Following	Jenny Hardy	Episode: "Mad Love"
2013	Nashville	Stacey	Recurring role (season 1)
2014	Gotham	Dr. Marks	Episode: "Spirit of the Goat"
2015	Elementary	Ms. Nichols	Episode: "The Best Way Out Is Always Through"
2015	Banshee	Lisa Marie	Episode: "You Can't Hide From The Dead"
2016	Billions	Terri McCue	Recurring role
2016	Shut Eye	Dr. Nora White	Main cast
2017	The Blacklist	Philomena	Episode: "Philomena (No. 61)"
2019	Fosse/Verdon	Joan McCracken	Also served as choreographer
2019	God Friended Me	Annie Keller	Recurring role (season 2)
2019	Jack Ryan	Lisa Calabrese	Recurring role (season 2)
2024–25	FBI: Most Wanted	Abby Deaver	Recurring role (season 6)
2025	Étoile	Miss Deena	2 episodes
2025–present	Sheriff Country	Nora Boone	Recurring role
