= Echo (The Americans) =

- The Americans episode
- Episode no.: Season 2 Episode 13
- Directed by: Daniel Sackheim
- Written by: Joel Fields; Joe Weisberg
- Production code: BDU213
- Original air date: May 21, 2014
- Running time: 47 minutes

Guest appearances
- Richard Thomas as Frank Gaad; Lev Gorn as Arkady Ivanovich; Michael Aronov as Anton Baklanov; John Carroll Lynch as Fred; Lee Tergesen as Andrew Larrick; Costa Ronin as Oleg Igorevich Burov; Owen Campbell as Jared Connors; Kelly AuCoin as Pastor Tim; Margo Martindale as Claudia

Episode chronology
← Previous "Operation Chronicle"	Next → "EST Men"
- The Americans season 2

"Echo" is the thirteenth episode and the season finale of the second season of the American television drama series The Americans, and the 26th overall episode of the series. It originally aired on FX in the United States on May 21, 2014.

== Plot ==
Philip and Elizabeth convince an anxious Fred to wear the special shoes into the factory, but he is challenged by a guard in the secure area and shot on his way out. He manages to leave the shoes in a dumpster as agreed and call Philip from a phone booth, but dies from his wound.

Stan learns that the Echo code is stored on a floppy disk in a safe. After getting instructions and a promise of Nina's freedom from Arkady (Lev Gorn), he records the code with a spy camera. He drops a package at the agreed location, but it turns out to be a note that says "Tell Nina I'm sorry". Heartbroken, Nina prepares to leave the Rezidentura to return to Moscow to stand trial for treason. While she is taken away, Stan sadly watches her from a parked car.

Paige returns from the protest, where Pastor Tim was one of those arrested for an act of civil disobedience. She tells her parents that she wants to live a life of self-sacrifice for a higher cause, as Jesus did. Afterward, Philip and Elizabeth agree that Paige does not understand the real sacrifices made by people like them.

Philip, as "Clark", visits Martha (Alison Wright) and they continue their conversation about Clark's reluctance to have children. Philip also learns that Martha has bought a Ladysmith gun. Elizabeth calls to tell him that Larrick is AWOL in the United States. They wake the children and take them on a sudden unannounced "vacation" at a motel near the cabin where Jared is staying. Philip meets with the KGB exfiltration team, but is captured by Larrick at gunpoint and put in the trunk of a car. Elizabeth goes to the cabin and talks to Jared, and they are also captured by Larrick. As Larrick is about to put Elizabeth in the trunk with Philip, saying he plans to turn himself and them in to the authorities, Jared pulls out a previously unseen gun and exchanges fire with Larrick, enabling the Jennings to overpower and kill Larrick. In his dying moments, Jared confesses that he killed his parents and sister. He also reveals that he is in love with Kate and that she recruited him as a KGB agent. He killed his parents because they objected to his being recruited by the KGB.

The Jennings then meet with Claudia (Margo Martindale), who tells them that Jared's recruitment was part of a plan to develop agents with clean American backgrounds, and that The Centre wants Paige to be the next recruit, this time with their cooperation. They object, and Claudia reminds them that they are under orders. Philip finds Arkady at a magazine stand and tells him that if The Centre contacts Paige without going through them, the Jennings will leave the KGB's employ. Later, Philip and Elizabeth discuss the idea of revealing their identity to Paige and having her follow in their footsteps; Philip is vehemently against it, but the idea seems to grow on Elizabeth, who believes after the earlier conversation about self-sacrifice that Paige needs "a cause".

== Production ==
The episode was written by Joel Fields and the series creator Joe Weisberg, and directed by Daniel Sackheim.

== Reception ==
The episode was watched by 1.29 million viewers and scored 0.5 ratings in 18–49 demographics, as per Nielsen ratings. Overall, the episode was critically acclaimed. The A.V. Club gave the episode an "A". Alan Sepinwall from Hitfix reviewed the episode positively and called it "a fantastic conclusion to a fantastic season". TV.com's review said, "That is how you end a season."
