= A Little Night Music (The Americans) =

- The Americans episode
- Episode no.: Season 2 Episode 4
- Directed by: Lodge Kerrigan
- Written by: Stephen Schiff
- Production code: BDU204
- Original air date: March 19, 2014
- Running time: 43 minutes

Guest appearances
- Richard Thomas as Frank Gaad; Lev Gorn as Arkady Ivanovich; Costa Ronin as Oleg Burov; Michael Aronov as Anton Baklanov; Jefferson White as Brad Mullin; Cliff Marc Simon as Mossad Agent; Cotter Smith as Deputy Attorney General Warren; Margo Martindale as Claudia

Episode chronology
← Previous "The Walk In"	Next → "The Deal"
- The Americans season 2

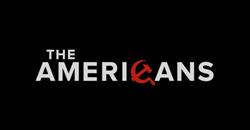

"A Little Night Music" is the fourth episode of the second season of the American television drama series The Americans, and the 17th overall episode of the series. It originally aired on FX in the United States on March 19, 2014.

== Plot ==
Claudia gives the Jennings two assignments—one to capture Anton Baklanov, a defector from the Soviet Union whose research is key to helping the US develop stealth technology, and another to get close to Andrew Larrick, the primary suspect in the Connors' murders. Philip monitors Baklanov, while Elizabeth must use naval recruit Brad Mullen to get information about Larrick. After meeting him at a music store, she gains Mullen's sympathy with a fake story about being raped by Larrick at a bar and how the rape was covered up by the military. She manipulates Mullen into offering to get her the files on Larrick; however, Mullen fears being caught obtaining the files.

When the Jennings attempt to abduct Baklanov, they are attacked by two assailants—after a fight, one drives off with Baklanov in the trunk and the other is captured. Meanwhile, fallout from Vladimir Kosygin's death may affect Agent Gaad's job; Oleg's family influence gets him a higher security clearance which allows him to access Nina's field reports. Paige's new friend Kelly takes her to a church function causing Philip and Elizabeth to be dismayed by Paige's new signs of Christian faith.

== Production ==
=== Development ===
In February 2014, FX confirmed that the fourth episode of the season would be titled "A Little Night Music", and that it would be written by Stephen Schiff, and directed by Lodge Kerrigan. This was Schiff's first writing credit, and Kerrigan's first directing credit.

== Reception ==
=== Viewers ===
In its original American broadcast, "A Little Night Music" was seen by an estimated 1.39 million household viewers with a 0.5 in the 18–49 demographics. This means that 0.5 percent of all households with televisions watched the episode. This was a 9% increase in viewership from the previous episode, which was watched by 1.27 million household viewers with a 0.4 in the 18–49 demographics.

=== Critical reviews ===
"A Little Night Music" received extremely positive reviews from critics. Eric Goldman of IGN gave the episode a "great" 8.7 out of 10 and wrote in his verdict, "Elizabeth is in the highest pressure job imaginable, so suffice to say, her beginning to crack is not a good thing. Whether or not a breaking point is coming or if she can get through these issues is giving this season a strong through-line, along with the search for Emmett and Leanne's killer."

Alan Sepinwall of HitFix wrote, "'A Little Night Music' was filled with such intersections of reality and invention. Some were light, like Philip and Elizabeth folding laundry while calmly divvying up a honey-do list that includes affairs, extra spouses, blackmail and more. Many others were less fun, but each fascinating in its own right." The A.V. Club gave the episode a "B+" grade and wrote, "it's easy to see the memory flashing behind Elizabeth's eyes, her painful past informing this character she's using to get what she wants in the moment. Her pain is a part of her skill set. It's part of what makes her dangerous, but it's also part of what makes her vulnerable, as we see in the cliffhanger conclusion of 'A Little Night Music.'"

Matt Zoller Seitz of Vulture gave the episode a 3 star rating out of 5 and wrote, "This show is a layer cake of lies. And yet the characters who behave deceptively in the name of their jobs still have to be truthful in aspects of their private lives, and the parents among them have to instill some semblance of good values in their children. Under such circumstances, every move is a kind of hypocrisy." Carissa Pavlica of TV Fanatic gave the episode a 4.6 star rating out of 5 and wrote, "They survived, but they lost both Baklanov and their car. Bright spot? Maybe Philip will get the new car he wants. Neither mission was a success, but both are still in play. And that at least is something."
