= The Deal (The Americans) =

- The Americans episode
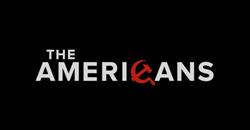
- The Americans
- Episode no.: Season 2 Episode 5
- Directed by: Dan Attias
- Written by: Angelina Burnett
- Production code: BDU205
- Original air date: March 26, 2014
- Running time: 51 minutes

Guest appearances
- Richard Thomas as Frank Gaad; Lev Gorn as Arkady Ivanovich; Costa Ronin as Oleg Burov; Michael Aronov as Anton Baklanov; John Bedford Lloyd as Jim Halliwell; Cliff Marc Simon as Mossad Agent; Wrenn Schmidt as Kate; Jefferson White as Brad Mullin

Episode chronology
← Previous "A Little Night Music"	Next → "Behind the Red Door"
- The Americans season 2

"The Deal" is the fifth episode of the second season of the American television drama series The Americans, and the 18th overall episode of the series. It originally aired on FX in the United States on March 26, 2014.

== Plot ==
The Jennings are attacked during kidnapping Anton Baklanov, the stealth technology scientist. Baklanov was taken away as the Jennings manage to capture and hide one of the attackers in an abandoned restaurant later. The man turns out to be an agent of Mossad (the national intelligence agency of Israel), which prompts the Soviets to make a deal with Israel. Israel agrees to hand over Anton in exchange for the agent and thousands of refusenik Jews being allowed to leave the Soviet Union. Philip stays with their captive while the Soviets attempt to trade him for the scientist Anton. The Mossad agent aggravates Philip by discussing their roles in the war and says that where he "hides what he does", Philip "hides who he is".

Elizabeth receives Martha's messages for Clark. Posing as Clark's sister Jennifer, she convinces Martha not to put Clark's name on an application form. Martha, who is drunk, tells "Jennifer" that Clark is an "animal in bed".

The FBI gets word that Anton is missing and realizes that the Soviets are trying to extract him.

Elizabeth gets Andrew Larrick's files from Mullen, who realizes that she will no longer be interested in a relationship with him.

The trade deal is made and, after swapping the Mossad agent for Anton, Philip drives Anton to a cargo ship headed for Russia. En route, Anton begs Philip to let him stay in America and work from there, breaking down in tears. Philip ignores him.

Based on Nina's word, Stan deduces that Oleg Igerovich Burov would be the one transporting Anton and tails him. When they arrive at the docks, Oleg is waiting for Stan (Anton was taken to another location). Oleg tells Stan that he is the only one who knows Nina is working for him, and threatens to expose it if he gets nothing in return.

== Production ==
=== Development ===
In February 2014, FX confirmed that the fifth episode of the season would be titled "The Deal", and that it would be written by Angelina Burnett, and directed by Dan Attias. This was Burnett's first writing credit, and Attias' first directing credit.

== Reception ==
=== Viewers ===
In its original American broadcast, "The Deal" was seen by an estimated 1.36 million household viewers with a 0.4 in the 18–49 demographics. This means that 0.4 percent of all households with televisions watched the episode. This was a slight decrease in viewership from the previous episode, which was watched by 1.39 million household viewers with a 0.5 in the 18–49 demographics.

=== Critical reviews ===
"The Deal" received critical acclaim. Eric Goldman of IGN gave the episode a "great" 8.8 out of 10 and wrote in his verdict, "This week's Americans put Philip in another fascinating scenario with a fellow, albeit enemy, spy, while Elizabeth had to deal, face to face, with the emotional fallout of a husband who has a second wife as part of their job."

Alan Sepinwall of HitFix wrote, "'The Deal' is an installment of The Americans where the whole isn't as strong as the sum of the individual parts, because even though the parts are mostly terrific, there are too many of them. FX has given this show, like many of its dramas, the freedom to come in long when the creative team needs the extra time, but in this case I would say being forced to hit a rigid time would have been useful." The A.V. Club gave the episode an "A" grade and wrote, "We've been talking a bit this season about how the show boils everything in its universe down to questions of loyalty and fidelity, but 'The Deal' took things a step further, to my mind. Now we're dealing not just with loyalty but the idea of having a home, or even a homeland. That idea is already deeply buried in the creation of the nation of Israel, but we also see how Philip long for the Soviet Union from time to time, or how Anton has made the United States unambiguously his home. Remove these characters from their familiar trappings, and they become unmoored."

Matt Zoller Seitz of Vulture gave the episode a perfect 5 star rating out of 5 and wrote, "'The Deal,' the fifth episode of The Americans' second season, is one of the greats. Running longer than normal and giving every major character plenty to do, it could have been titled 'Quartets.' Written by Angelina Burnett and directed by Daniel Attias, it boasted more plot than some shows pack into a season, yet it was all not just intelligible, but fascinating." Carla Day of TV Fanatic gave the episode a 4.5 star rating out of 5 and wrote, "'The Deal' was my favorite episode of the season. The nuances were subtle, but clearly demonstrated the internal struggles of the characters, especially Philip. The Soviets got their scientist, but I'm not sure it was really a win for Philip. Right now, I'm most nervous for Nina. She's in a tough spot and it just got so much more dangerous."
