= Stealth (The Americans) =

- The Americans episode
- Episode no.: Season 2 Episode 11
- Directed by: Gregory Hoblit
- Written by: Joshua Brand
- Production code: BDU211
- Original air date: May 7, 2014
- Running time: 45 minutes

Guest appearances
- Richard Thomas as Frank Gaad; Lev Gorn as Arkady Ivanovich; Michael Aronov as Anton Baklanov; Željko Ivanek as John Skeevers; John Carroll Lynch as Fred; Lee Tergesen as Andrew Larrick; Costa Ronin as Oleg Igorevich Burov; Peter Von Berg as Vasili Nikolaevich; Wrenn Schmidt as Kate; Owen Campbell as Jared Connors

Episode chronology
← Previous "Yousaf"	Next → "Operation Chronicle"
- The Americans season 2

"Stealth" is the eleventh episode of the second season of the American television drama series The Americans, and the 24th overall episode of the series. It originally aired on FX in the United States on May 7, 2014.

== Plot ==
In the research facility in Russia, a cooperative but resentful Anton (Michael Aronov) tells Vasili (Peter Von Berg) that he needs two things to continue developing stealth technology: details of the radar-absorbent material used by the Americans, and a computer system called Echo that will allow him to test designs. To get the former, Philip befriends former engineer John Skeevers (Željko Ivanek), who is dying of cancer and believes he was poisoned by his former employers. He learns that the material is a paint containing tiny iron balls and is possibly poisonous.

Philip learns from his bug that the FBI now know that Emmet and Leanne were KGB operatives. Elizabeth visits Jared in her social worker persona, and learns that the FBI has visited him and shown him their pictures, though Jared does not appear to have recognized her yet. She then follows Jared to where he meets with an undisguised Kate. Before she can ask Kate about this, Larrick attacks, overpowers, interrogates, and kills Kate at her house, after figuring out how to decode her radio signals from The Centre. When she does not report, The Centre sends Philip and Elizabeth to Kate's house to investigate, where they find a hidden, encoded note that Kate left telling them to "Get Jared Out."

Arkady (Lev Gorn) and Oleg (Costa Ronin), after hearing about Stan's marital problem, decide that it is time to finally turn him to get the rest of the key ingredients for stealth technology. Arkady tells Oleg that Nina will be returned to Moscow and tried for treason if this fails, hinting that Oleg's influence might be able to help her; Oleg tells Nina this as well. Nina tells Stan she fears for her life and sees no way out, and Stan promises to protect her whatever the cost. At home, Sandra has made up her mind to leave the house, and they discuss possibilities about their future, but neither of them know what they want.

Philip suggests that Paige be allowed to go to the summer camp. Elizabeth refuses but later allows Paige to go on a church trip to protest American nuclear weapons, recognizing echoes of her own idealism. Henry interviews Stan as a "hero" for a school project.

== Production ==
=== Development ===
In April 2014, FX confirmed that the eleventh episode of the season would be titled "Stealth", and that it would be written by Joshua Brand, and directed by Gregory Hoblit. This was Brand's sixth writing credit, and Hoblit's first directing credit.

== Reception ==
=== Viewers ===
In its original American broadcast, "Stealth" was seen by an estimated 1.12 million household viewers with a 0.3 in the 18–49 demographics. This means that 0.3 percent of all households with televisions watched the episode. This was a 12% decrease in viewership from the previous episode, which was watched by 1.27 million household viewers with a 0.4 in the 18–49 demographics.

=== Critical reviews ===
"Stealth" received extremely positive reviews from critics. Eric Goldman of IGN gave the episode a "great" 8.8 out of 10 and wrote in his verdict, "This week's Americans made things even more complicated, as it looks like Jared may already be more involved than it seemed, while Nina has to pull a Hail Mary to save herself. It's too bad Kate's story ended just as it was starting, but there's a ton in play to fuel the last couple of episodes of the season."

Alan Sepinwall of HitFix wrote, "In general, this kind of show does not do well by the offspring of its adult characters, since their stories can feel, at best, like a distraction from what the show's really about. But in the case of The Americans, the family drama is fundamentally baked into the concept, it provides frequent tension both personally and professionally for Philip and Elizabeth, and the battle of Soviet and US ideologies makes a story as innocuous as Paige's interest in church become something much thornier and more interesting." The A.V. Club gave the episode a "B+" grade and wrote, "'Stealth' is the 'get everything set up for the last two episodes' episode, the 'holy shit, has this show gotten tense this season' episode. Every moment of it crackles like bombs are about to start exploding all over. And some of them do."

Jen Chaney of Vulture gave the episode a 4 star rating out of 5 and wrote, "The Americans was oh so quiet this week, oh so still. There were no shouting matches, no pops of gunfire on military bases, and no spy-business set pieces unfolding to the blast of intense music by Pete Townshend. This one was mostly talk, a series of conversations that easily could have taken place in a library without eliciting a single 'Shhh!' It was low-key, but in an effectively unsettling way, the calm before the last two episodes of the season, which may bring a serious storm to the Jennings family." Carla Day of TV Fanatic gave the episode a 4.7 star rating out of 5 and wrote, "There's only two episode left and I won't even hazard a guess at where the story will end up at the season's end. There's so many different directions that it could go. Everyone is in some sort of danger."
