= New Car (The Americans) =

- The Americans episode
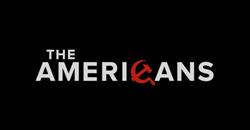
- Logo for The Americans
- Episode no.: Season 2 Episode 8
- Directed by: John Dahl
- Written by: Peter Ackerman
- Production code: BDU208
- Original air date: April 16, 2014
- Running time: 47 minutes

Guest appearances
- Richard Thomas as Frank Gaad; Lev Gorn as Arkady Ivanovich; Michael Aronov as Anton Baklanov; Aimee Carrero as Chena; Lee Tergesen as Andrew Larrick; Costa Ronin as Oleg Burov; John Rue as Salesman; Wrenn Schmidt as Kate; Cotter Smith as Deputy Attorney General Warren; Peter Von Berg as Vasili Nikolaevich; Graham Winton as Lewis Rendell

Episode chronology
← Previous "Arpanet"	Next → "Martial Eagle"
- The Americans season 2

"New Car" is the eighth episode of the second season of the American television drama series The Americans, and the 21st overall episode of the series. It originally aired on FX in the United States on April 16, 2014.

== Plot ==
Philip and Henry go to a car dealership to look at new cars, and they buy a new Camaro Z-28. Elizabeth is not pleased with the purchase but says she wants Philip to be happy. Philip stands firm and presses Elizabeth about her enjoyment of American life, but she responds that she is here to do a job and life in America is easier, but not better.

Martha implies that she no longer wants to spy on her coworkers. Philip plans to play a doctored recording of her coworkers making fun of her looks. But his surprise appearance at her apartment is enough to change her mind without using the recording.

Lucia ambushes Larrick at his house with a tranquilizer gun, but her plan backfires when Larrick overpowers her and shoots her with her own tranquilizer. He calls Elizabeth over, revealing a tied-up Lucia. They negotiate Lucia's life for Larrick's release from the KGB's control. However, when Larrick unties Lucia, she attacks him with a corkscrew but is stopped by Larrick. As Lucia is slowly being strangled to death, Elizabeth points her gun at Larrick, who reminds her about the mission. Forced to choose between saving Lucia or saving the mission, she chooses the mission and lets Lucia die. She later expresses frustration to Philip that Lucia did not understand her role.

Philip meets with their handler Kate. She instructs him to steal information on America's stealth program. She also informs him that the propeller plan he had stolen earlier is faulty, causing a Soviet submarine to sink and all 160 men aboard to die. Philip and Elizabeth are distraught to learn the news.

Henry is caught breaking in by the neighbors when he falls asleep on the sofa after playing a video game. The neighbors bring him back to Philip and Elizabeth without calling the police. When Philip and Elizabeth later talk to Henry, he breaks down admitting to his mistake and saying that he is a good person who 'knows the difference between right and wrong'.

Stan gives Oleg the FBI surveillance log on him and fails to get Oleg to guarantee Nina's safety. Nina later confronts Stan about Oleg wanting more, realizing that she has successfully turned Stan when he promises to keep her safe no matter what. Stan is frustrated when the FBI and DoJ refuse to grant him access to Anton's research. He later meets with a DoD official trying to gain clearance.

Arkady is concerned about his nephew in the navy due to the submarine sinking and is upset that the KGB has failed the country. Oleg surmises that the navy is also at fault for placing the propeller on a larger submarine and not testing it adequately.

Philip and Elizabeth kidnap a driver who services the septic system of Martial Eagle base and questions him about his routine. The man is hesitant and extremely fearful. Though Elizabeth is direct and impatient, Philip eventually coaxes the man into answering, telling him everything will be okay. When Elizabeth starts to pull out a gun to kill the man to prevent being traced, Philip stops her, stating they can tie him up instead.

== Production ==
=== Development ===
In March 2014, FX confirmed that the eighth episode of the season would be titled "New Car", and that it would be written by Peter Ackerman, and directed by John Dahl. This was Ackerman's first writing credit, and Dahl's second directing credit.

== Reception ==
=== Viewers ===
In its original American broadcast, "New Car" was seen by an estimated 1.39 million household viewers with a 0.4 in the 18–49 demographics. This means that 0.4 percent of all households with televisions watched the episode. This was a 17% increase in viewership from the previous episode, which was watched by 1.18 million household viewers with a 0.4 in the 18–49 demographics.

=== Critical reviews ===
"New Car" received critical acclaim. Eric Goldman of IGN gave the episode an "amazing" 9 out of 10 and wrote in his verdict, "Philip may have gotten Elizabeth not to kill Lewis, after they got the info they needed from the truck driver, but they've both already killed innocent people to complete missions – and probably will kill more. The Americans continues to thrill and engage by showing just how high the price is for these people, regardless of their country, to go all in on the spy game and how difficult it is to ever feel you're a 'winner' in this scenario."

Alan Sepinwall of HitFix wrote, "The sense of elation I felt at knowing this great show will be around a while longer comes in a nice contrast to 'New Car,' an episode whose prevailing emotions are despair and frustration that other people don't believe as deeply as you in the things that you think matter, and that even when they do, belief alone can't prevent great tragedy." The A.V. Club gave the episode an "A" grade and wrote, "That's the sort of moral quagmire that makes me love The Americans, and makes episode like 'New Car' so rewarding on subsequent viewings. Relationships and loyalties on this show fracture and morph and fold in on themselves to such an extent that it's impossible to maintain a rooting interest. We can only stare, semi-horrified, and wonder what comes next — and how things could possibly get worse."

Matt Zoller Seitz of Vulture gave the episode a perfect 5 star rating out of 5 and wrote, "The eighth episode of The Americans' second season is another classic, suffused with feelings of guilt and culpability, and eager to confront head-on the implications of its characters’ actions. The final scene is one of the most wrenching I've seen in a TV drama: Henry, son of the show's married secret spies, has been caught breaking into a neighbor's house to play their coveted Intellivision video game system, and tearfully confesses and asks forgiveness." Carissa Pavlica of TV Fanatic gave the episode a 4.5 star rating out of 5 and wrote, "On 'New Car', things got even more twisted, as all of the Americans and Russians working on the various projects started to work so closely it was almost as if they were working on the same side without knowing it. It's fascinating."
