= The Americans season 2 =

The Americans
- Season 2
- Season 2 DVD cover
- No. of episodes: 13

Release
- Original network: FX
- Original release: February 26 – May 21, 2014

Season chronology
- ← Previous; Season 1 Next → Season 3

The second season of the American television drama series The Americans, consisting of 13 episodes, premiered on FX on February 26, 2014, and concluded on May 21, 2014. The series was renewed for the second season on February 21, 2013.

== Cast ==
=== Main ===
- Keri Russell as Elizabeth Jennings (Nadezhda), a KGB officer
- Matthew Rhys as Philip Jennings (Mischa), a KGB officer
- Annet Mahendru as Nina Sergeevna Krilova, Agent Beeman's Soviet mole
- Susan Misner as Sandra Beeman, Stan's wife
- Alison Wright as Martha Hanson, Agent Gaad's secretary and Philip's informant
- Holly Taylor as Paige Jennings, Elizabeth and Philip's daughter
- Keidrich Sellati as Henry Jennings, Elizabeth and Philip's son
- Noah Emmerich as FBI Agent Stan Beeman

=== Recurring ===
- Lev Gorn as Arkady Ivanovich Zotov, the KGB's Rezident
- Costa Ronin as Oleg Igorevich Burov, a new KGB officer
- Richard Thomas as Agent Frank Gaad, Special Agent In Charge of the FBI Counterintelligence Division
- Lee Tergesen as Andrew Larrick, an American naval officer who helps the Russians with a mission, only to seek revenge when it goes wrong
- Owen Campbell as Jared Connors, the son of two KGB illegals
- Wrenn Schmidt as Kate, Philip and Elizabeth's new KGB handler
- Michael Aronov as Anton Baklanov, a scientist involved in stealth technology
- Aimee Carrero as Lucia, a Sandinista freedom fighter
- Kelly AuCoin as Pastor Tim, the head of a church Paige Jennings attends
- Margo Martindale as Claudia, the Jennings' KGB supervisor
- Daniel Flaherty as Matthew Beeman, Stan's son
- Peter Von Berg as Vasili Nikolaevich, a KGB Resident
- Gillian Alexy as Annelise, an informant of Philip's
- Rahul Khanna as Yousaf Rana, an officer in the Pakistani ISI Covert Action Division
- Reg Rogers as Charles Duluth, a journalist and KGB source
- Karen Pittman as Lisa, a Northrop employee from whom Elizabeth is gleaning information
- John Carroll Lynch as Fred, a KGB officer

== Production ==
Susan Misner, Annet Mahendru, and Alison Wright, who play Sandra Beeman, Nina, and Martha Hanson, respectively, are promoted to series regulars in season two, after having recurring roles in the first season. Filming for the second season began on October 9, 2013, according to Keri Russell.

On April 7, 2014, it was announced that Pete Townshend collaborated with series music composer Nathan Barr on an original song, titled "It Must Be Done", for the April 30 episode "Yousaf".

== Episodes ==
No. overall	No. in season	Title	Directed by	Written by	Original release date	Prod. code	US viewers (millions)
14	1	"Comrades"	Thomas Schlamme	Joel Fields & Joe Weisberg	February 26, 2014	BDU201	1.90
Elizabeth has recovered from being shot two months ago. She and Philip must leave Henry's 11th birthday party early in order to meet with Emmett and Leanne Connors, another spy couple, for a mission. Paige remains suspicious and sneaks into her parents' room during the night, only to find them having sex. The Jennings promise Henry a "birthday weekend" at an amusement park, which turns into a mission that ultimately results in the Connors' deaths and the Jennings being paranoid. Meanwhile, Nina informs Stan of a new arrival at the Rezidentura, Oleg Igorevich.
15	2	"Cardinal"	Daniel Sackheim	Joel Fields & Joe Weisberg	March 5, 2014	BDU202	1.46
Elizabeth stays mainly close to home to keep watch over the neighborhood and the children. She only ventures out to drop them off at the movies, in order to help Lucia Chena, a former Sandinista-turned agent, with her asset's overdose. Meanwhile, Philip investigates Fred, the Connors' asset, only to be trapped by him in his house. Philip must convince him that they are all on the same side and in danger. Fred reveals information about a submarine project soon to be moved. Paige keeps suspecting her parents are hiding something. Elsewhere, Nina tells Stan about a Rezidentura "walk-in" wanting to help them. Stan and the FBI learn the man is Bruce Dameran, an employee of the World Bank.
16	3	"The Walk In"	Constantine Makris	Stuart Zicherman	March 12, 2014	BDU203	1.27
Philip and Elizabeth infiltrate the submarine parts factory and he takes pictures of propeller plans. Afterwards, she visits Jared Connors, intent on delivering a letter from his mother as promised upon her death. However, Elizabeth changes her mind about giving it to him. Back home, Paige skips school to track down Elizabeth's "aunt". Stan investigates Dameran's work history with the World Bank, only to learn it is a cover for an assassination attempt on a company official by Dameran.
17	4	"A Little Night Music"	Lodge Kerrigan	Stephen Schiff	March 19, 2014	BDU204	1.39
Claudia gives the Jennings two assignments—Anton Baklanov, a defector from the Soviet Union whose research is key to helping the U.S. develop stealth technology and Andrew Larrick, the primary suspect in the Connors' murders. Philip monitors Baklanov, while Elizabeth must use naval recruit Brad Mullen to get information about Larrick. She gains Mullen's sympathy with a story about being raped by Larrick. However, Mullen fears being caught obtaining the info. When the Jennings attempt to abduct Baklanov, they are attacked by two assailants, one of whom drives off with Baklanov. Meanwhile, fallout from Vlad's death may affect Agent Gaad's job; Oleg's family influence gets him a higher security clearance; and Paige's new friend Kelly takes her to a church function.
18	5	"The Deal"	Dan Attias	Angelina Burnett	March 26, 2014	BDU205	1.36
Philip hides their attacker, who turns out to be a Mossad agent, while the Soviet Union negotiates with Israel to trade him with Anton. Elizabeth meets Martha as Clark's sister and convinces her not to put Clark's name on an application form. Elizabeth is intrigued by Martha's characterization of Clark's sexual prowess. Stan and the FBI search for Anton's extraction point. Oleg leads Stan on a wild goose chase to an alternate port. Oleg tells Stan that he has uncovered Stan's relationship with Nina and threatens to expose her.
19	6	"Behind the Red Door"	Charlotte Sieling	Melissa James Gibson	April 2, 2014	BDU206	1.21
Elizabeth and Philip meet Larrick, who they suspect is Emmett and Leanne's killer. From Larrick's file they learn of his involvement in Operation Martial Eagle, a project to train Contras in the US. Lucia has sex with Carl as a distraction so Elizabeth can steal files about ARPANET. Stan asks Nina to take a polygraph test if she wants to get exfiltrated. Elizabeth asks Philip to demonstrate the prowess described by Martha.
20	7	"Arpanet"	Kevin Dowling	Joshua Brand	April 9, 2014	BDU207	1.18
Nina agrees to a polygraph test on Oleg's orders and assurance. Philip gets orders to bug ARPANET, with the help of Duluth. Larrick tells Elizabeth that he has been ordered to Nicaragua, to set up a base and mine the harbor of Managua, but he will still get them into the contra training camp. Lucia is upset with the news of his leaving, as she had planned to kill him.
21	8	"New Car"	John Dahl	Peter Ackerman	April 16, 2014	BDU208	1.39
Philip and Henry arrive home in a new Chevrolet Camaro. Elizabeth is called to Larrick's house, where he has subdued Lucia, who intended to abduct and kill him. Set free, Lucia makes another attempt on his life, and he begins to choke her. Elizabeth is torn between saving her and allowing Larrick to continue helping them. Philip is demoralized upon learning that the stolen propeller plans were fake decoys that resulted in a Russian submarine sinking. Stan gives the surveillance log to Oleg and later promises to protect Nina.
22	9	"Martial Eagle"	Alik Sakharov	Story by : Oliver North & Tracey Scott Wilson; Teleplay by : Tracey Scott Wilson	April 23, 2014	BDU209	1.37
Elizabeth and Philip infiltrate the contra training base, which results in more casualties than Philip can bear. The Jennings family attends church, where it is revealed Paige has donated all of her savings. Neither of her parents approve of this gesture, especially Philip, who nearly takes his anger out on the church minister. Fred and other stealth aircraft scientists meet with Stan, who later arrives home to learn his wife is having an affair. Elizabeth attends an Alcoholics Anonymous meeting to glean stealth technology information from a Northrop employee.
23	10	"Yousaf"	Stefan Schwartz	Stephen Schiff & Stuart Zicherman	April 30, 2014	BDU210	1.27
After Agent Gaad's threats, the Rezidentura drops the charges of Vlad's death and Gaad is reinstated. Philip seeks Annelise's help to seduce and extract information from a high-ranking Pakistani ISI officer named Yousaf. Stan interviews Emmett and Leanne's son Jared to identify the illegals. Larrick returns to America and decides to hunt the people responsible for his fellow soldiers' killings at Martial Eagle base.
24	11	"Stealth"	Gregory Hoblit	Joshua Brand	May 7, 2014	BDU211	1.12
Elizabeth visits Jared to find out what Stan told him. She later discovers Kate meeting Jared as well. Larrick abducts Kate to try to learn the location of her agents. Arkady instructs Nina to get more information about stealth from Stan, while Philip covertly meets John Skeevers, a stealth technician, and learns the secret about RAM.
25	12	"Operation Chronicle"	Andrew Bernstein	Joel Fields & Joe Weisberg	May 14, 2014	BDU212	1.27
Elizabeth gets Jared out to safety per instructions from the Centre, while Larrick is trailing them discreetly all along. Arkady forces Stan's hand to steal the "Echo" program in exchange for Nina's safety. Martha recovers some top-secret FBI files and presents them to Philip.
26	13	"Echo"	Daniel Sackheim	Joel Fields & Joe Weisberg	May 21, 2014	BDU213	1.29
The Jennings panic when they find out that Larrick has been AWOL for some time. The truth about the killings of Emmett and Leanne is revealed. Stan makes an important decision that could affect his relationships.

== Reception ==
=== Reviews ===
Review aggregator Metacritic has given the season a score of 88 out of 100 (based on 31 critics), signifying "universal acclaim". On Rotten Tomatoes, another review aggregator site, it holds a 97% rating with an average score of 8.8 out of 10, based on 38 reviews.

=== Accolades ===
For the 30th TCA Awards, The Americans was nominated for Outstanding Achievement in Drama and Matthew Rhys was nominated for Individual Achievement in Drama. For the 4th Critics' Choice Television Awards, the series received four nominations, including for Best Drama Series, Matthew Rhys for Best Actor in a Drama Series, Keri Russell for Best Actress in a Drama Series, and Annet Mahendru for Best Supporting Actress in a Drama Series. For the 66th Primetime Emmy Awards, Margo Martindale was nominated for Outstanding Guest Actress in a Drama Series. For the 19th Satellite Awards, Keri Russell won for Best Actress in a Drama Series.

== Home media releases ==
The second season was released only on DVD format in region 1 on December 16, 2014, and in region 2 on January 26, 2015. Special features include two featurettes—"Operation Ghost Stories: The Real Directorate 'S'" and "Shades of Red: The Mortality of the Americans"; gag reel; and deleted scenes.
