= Yousaf (The Americans) =

- The Americans episode
- Episode no.: Season 2 Episode 10
- Directed by: Stefan Schwartz
- Written by: Stephen Schiff; Stuart Zicherman
- Production code: BDU210
- Original air date: April 30, 2014
- Running time: 47 minutes

Guest appearances
- Richard Thomas as Frank Gaad; Lev Gorn as Arkady Ivanovich; Costa Ronin as Oleg Igorevich Burov; Gillian Alexy as Annelise; Rahul Khanna as Yousaf Rana; Wrenn Schmidt as Kate; Lee Tergesen as Andrew Larrick; David Adkins as George; Owen Campbell as Jared Connors

Episode chronology
← Previous "Martial Eagle"	Next → "Stealth"
- The Americans season 2

"Yousaf" is the tenth episode of the second season of the American television drama series The Americans, and the 23rd overall episode of the series. It originally aired on FX in the United States on April 30, 2014.

== Plot ==
Elizabeth wakes up in the middle of the night to realize that Philip is unable to sleep because he is upset over getting angry at Paige. Elizabeth consoles him, saying that he was right to scold her for her disrespect.

Kate informs Philip and Elizabeth that The Centre is happy about the result of their mission and assigns them a new mission: Extract information from Yousaf Rana (Rahul Khanna), one of the Pakistani ISI agents on a visit to America to meet CIA officials. Elizabeth begins reconnaissance on Yousaf, but Philip suggests they use Annelise (Gillian Alexy) for the mission instead. Elizabeth is hesitant but agrees to it. Philip (as a Swedish intelligence officer, Scott Berman) meets Annelise and seeks her help to extract information from Yousaf. Kate is angry with Philip that they are not keeping her in the loop about the mission. Annelise informs Philip that Yousaf and his boss, Javid Parvez are here about a top-secret mission, but Yousaf does not know the details because he is second-in-command. The Centre orders them to kill Javid so that Yousaf will take his place and they can get information from him. Elizabeth kills Javid at the swimming pool in the night, making it appear to be a heart attack. Annelise meets Yousaf secretly and they have sex, and later Annelise angrily rushes into Philip's room. She feels bad about having sex with another man while she is trying to repair her relationship with her husband. Philip calms her down saying it pains him as well but it is for a cause bigger than both of them.

Arkady Ivanovich (Lev Gorn) visits Frank Gaad and informs him that after his threats, the Russian government has withdrawn the charges in Vlad's murder case. Gaad tells him that he is reinstated and as long as they kill American people, they'll hit back and kill Russians. Beeman tells Gaad that he suspects that the secret meeting in Alexandria and the death of family (Emmett and Leanne Connors) are connected. After inspecting the briefcase from the evidence, Gaad is confident that they were part of an intelligence service. Later, Beeman informs Nina about his suspicion that Emmet and Leanne were illegals and also that his wife Sandra is having an affair. Beeman meets Connors' surviving son Jared; initially hesitant, he agrees to answer his questions. Beeman shows him sketches of Philip and Elizabeth and asks him if he knows them.

Andrew Larrick (Lee Tergesen) returns to America, seemingly intent on getting revenge. He tracks down and kills the KGB's DC-area switchboard operator. The operator fries the switchboard before being shot, but Larrick recovers Kate's phone number from its remnants.

Paige tells Philip that she wants to go to a church summer camp. Philip seems hesitant but agrees to talk to Elizabeth. Philip says he is afraid that if they deny her, Paige will rebel and resort to alcohol or other drugs, but Elizabeth disagrees. While emptying the garbage, Elizabeth discovers that Paige is trying to forge her name on a form for the summer camp. Paige reacts angrily when Elizabeth tells her she cannot go.

== Production ==
The episode was written by Stephen Schiff and Stuart Zicherman, and directed by Stefan Schwartz.

== Reception ==
The episode was watched by 1.27 million viewers and scored 0.4 ratings in 18–49 demographics, as per Nielsen ratings. The critics' review of the episode were positive. The A.V. Club gave the episode an A−. Alan Sepinwall from Hitfix reviewed the episode positively, saying the relationships are heading for complications. Huffington Post review said, "The way that plotline has surfaced in such a smart, substantial way to the FBI makes me want to hug this show."
