= Cardinal (The Americans) =

- The Americans episode
- Episode no.: Season 2 Episode 2
- Directed by: Daniel Sackheim
- Written by: Joel Fields; Joe Weisberg
- Production code: BDU202
- Original air date: March 5, 2014
- Running time: 44 minutes

Guest appearances
- Richard Thomas as Frank Gaad; Lev Gorn as Arkady Ivanovich; Costa Ronin as Oleg Igorevich; Aimee Carrero as Chena; Erik Jensen as Bruce Dameran; John Carroll Lynch as Fred; Anthony Arkin as Stavos; Nick Bailey as Carl

Episode chronology
← Previous "Comrades"	Next → "The Walk In"
- The Americans season 2

"Cardinal" is the second episode of the second season of the American television drama series The Americans, and the 15th overall episode of the series. It originally aired on FX in the United States on March 5, 2014.

== Plot ==
Elizabeth stays mainly close to home to keep watch over the neighborhood and the children. She only ventures out to drop them off at the movies, in order to help Lucia (Aimee Carrero), a former Sandinista-turned agent, with her asset's overdose. Meanwhile, Philip investigates Fred (John Carroll Lynch), the Connors' asset, only to be trapped by him in his house. Philip must convince him that they are all on the same side and in danger. Fred reveals information about a military project soon to be moved. Elsewhere, Nina tells Stan about a Rezidentura "walk-in" wanting to help them. Stan and the FBI learn the man is Bruce Dameran, an employee of the World Bank.

== Production ==
=== Development ===
In February 2014, FX confirmed that the second episode of the season would be titled "Cardinal", and that it would be written by executive producer Joel Fields and series creator Joe Weisberg, and directed by Daniel Sackheim. This was Fields' sixth writing credit, Weisberg's seventh writing credit, and Sackheim's second directing credit.

== Reception ==
=== Viewers ===
In its original American broadcast, "Cardinal" was seen by an estimated 1.46 million household viewers with a 0.6 in the 18–49 demographics. This means that 0.6 percent of all households with televisions watched the episode. This was a 24% decrease in viewership from the previous episode, which was watched by 1.90 million household viewers with a 0.7 in the 18–49 demographics.

=== Critical reviews ===
"Cardinal" received extremely positive reviews from critics. Eric Goldman of IGN gave the episode a "great" 8.7 out of 10 and wrote in his verdict, "Elizabeth's new paranoia, Philip's big talk with Fred (while being held prisoner) and a bigger look at Nina's current situation made for another great episode of The Americans."

Alan Sepinwall of HitFix wrote, "That battle between what's emotionally real versus what's important to the mission is one that's been part of the series from day one, but the stakes of this season – and the parallels we're seeing in Stan and Nina's relationship – have only magnified that conflict. It's a great start, even if the intensity was, by design, lower this week than last." The A.V. Club gave the episode a "B+" grade and wrote, "Much of this episode is just taken up with making sure that all of the right pieces are in place for the season's story engine to go forward. If 'Comrades' was the explosion, the violence that lurks over everything that follows, then 'Cardinal' is just like that electric box in the floor, the one that doesn’t immediately suggest its danger but packs more of a punch once you explore it further."

Matt Zoller Seitz of Vulture gave the episode a 4 star rating out of 5 and wrote, "Considering that the overwhelming majority of TV series, past and present, have no sense of global history at all, much less a point of view on it, The Americans' awareness of its fictional characters' place in the world seems all the more remarkable." Carla Day of TV Fanatic gave the episode a 4.7 star rating out of 5 and wrote, "This hour was a mixed bag of events. Overall, it played out slowly, but there was so much going on. At the end of the episode, it was hard to believe they fit in so many different stories and intertwined them seamlessly. Even Elizabeth's family time and then emergency call to help the new recruit with her Congressional aide fit in well."
