= The Walk In (The Americans) =

- The Americans episode
- Episode no.: Season 2 Episode 3
- Directed by: Constantine Makris
- Written by: Stuart Zicherman
- Production code: BDU203
- Original air date: March 12, 2014
- Running time: 43 minutes

Guest appearances
- Richard Thomas as Frank Gaad; Lev Gorn as Arkady Ivanovich; Costa Ronin as Oleg Burov; Kathleen Chalfant as Aunt Helen; Natalie Gold as Leanne Connors; Erik Jensen as Bruce Dameran; Owen Campbell as Jared Connors; Dave T. Koeing as Derek

Episode chronology
← Previous "Cardinal"	Next → "A Little Night Music"
- The Americans season 2

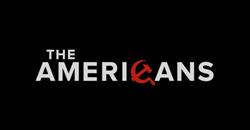
The Americans logo

"The Walk In" is the third episode of the second season of the American television drama series The Americans, and the 16th overall episode of the series. It originally aired on FX in the United States on March 12, 2014.

== Plot ==
Philip and Elizabeth infiltrate a factory and Philip takes pictures of propeller plans. Afterward, Elizabeth visits Jared Connors, intent on delivering a letter from his mother, as she had promised before his mother's death. However, Elizabeth changes her mind about giving it to him after knowing his mental condition. Back home, Paige skips school to track down Elizabeth's "aunt". Stan investigates Dameran's work history with the World Bank, only to learn it is a cover for an assassination attempt on a bank official.

== Production ==
=== Development ===
In February 2014, FX confirmed that the third episode of the season would be titled "The Walk In", and that it would be written by Stuart Zicherman, and directed by Constantine Makris. This was Zicherman's first writing credit, and Makris' first directing credit.

== Reception ==
=== Viewers ===
In its original American broadcast, "The Walk In" was seen by an estimated 1.27 million household viewers with a 0.4 in the 18–49 demographics. This means that 0.4 percent of all households with televisions watched the episode. This was a 14% decrease in viewership from the previous episode, which was watched by 1.46 million household viewers with a 0.6 in the 18–49 demographics.

=== Critical reviews ===
"The Walk In" received extremely positive reviews from critics. Eric Goldman of IGN gave the episode a "great" 8.5 out of 10 and wrote in his verdict, "Season 2 of The Americans continues to be strong, as we got another fascinating look at who Philip and Elizabeth are, and the events that shaped them."

Alan Sepinwall of HitFix wrote, "The premiere opened season 2 with a series of bangs, but 'The Walk-In' demonstrates how great Fields, Weisberg and company have gotten at exploiting all the emotional complexities of the elaborate web of lies they've spun. Great, great episode, and a fantastic closing." The A.V. Club gave the episode an "A–" grade and wrote, "'The Walk In' does that thing where the episode throws dozens of balls into the air at its beginning, then somehow catches nearly every single one as it ends."

Matt Zoller Seitz of Vulture gave the episode a 4 star rating out of 5 and wrote, "The Americans aired its first great second-season episode last night, 'The Walk-In.' With its intricately arranged scenes of espionage and domestic distress, plus some characteristically clever use of flashbacks to beef up characters who were killed off before we really got a chance to know them, this was very close to a perfect hour, capped with one of the show's trademark Deep Cuts montages, this one set to Peter Gabriel's 'Here Comes the Flood.'" Carissa Pavlica of TV Fanatic gave the episode a 4.6 star rating out of 5 and wrote, "It's interesting watching them fight through these new feelings. It could go in either direction and their inner struggle is as integral to the structure of The Americans as any of the espionage."
