= Arpanet (The Americans) =

- The Americans episode
- Episode no.: Season 2 Episode 7
- Directed by: Kevin Dowling
- Written by: Joshua Brand
- Production code: BDU207
- Original air date: April 9, 2014
- Running time: 41 minutes

Guest appearances
- Lev Gorn as Arkady Ivanovich; Costa Ronin as Oleg Burov; Geoffrey Cantor as Thane Rosenbloom; Aimee Carrero as Lucia; Reg Rogers as Charles Duluth; Lee Tergesen as Andrew Larrick; Wrenn Schmidt as Kate; Paul Urcioli as Polygraph Administrator

Episode chronology
← Previous "Behind the Red Door"	Next → "New Car"
- The Americans season 2

"Arpanet" is the seventh episode of the second season of the American television drama series The Americans, and the 20th overall episode of the series. It originally aired on FX in the United States on April 9, 2014.

== Plot ==
After consulting with Arkady and Oleg, and with the promise of coaching from Oleg, Nina tells Stan that she will take the FBI's polygraph test. Oleg suggests a few techniques including that she visualize him in the room as well as clenching her anus. During the polygraph test, the FBI asks if she knows who killed Vlad. She answers yes while looking at Stan knowingly. After she passes, she declines Stan's offer to get her out of the embassy, saying that she will be able to help him more after she is read into the Illegals Program. It is revealed that Nina and Oleg were planning this together. They celebrate their success and have sex in a hotel room.

Kate relays orders for Philip to bug the ARPANET. Philip recruits the help of Charles Duluth, an alcoholic conservative journalist who is also a KGB agent. Posing as a journalist, Philip first meets with a computer scientist at a university to learn the details of ARPANET. Later, Philip and Duluth break into the university to plant the bug. Philip is forced to set off the alarms in order to enter the computer lab undetected, but is forced to kill one of the employees who returns to grab his wallet. Philip later finds Duluth drinking at the bar. Duluth expresses exhilaration over the success of the mission, and a more reserved Philip reveals he was forced to kill the worker.

With Philip watching afar with a sniper rifle, Larrick tells Elizabeth that he has been ordered to Nicaragua, to set up a base and mine the harbor of Managua, but he will still be able to let them into the Contra training camp before he leaves. Lucia is upset to learn this, because (as she tells Elizabeth) she planned to kill Larrick there in revenge for his atrocities in Nicaragua. Elizabeth tells her that Larrick is more valuable as a cooperating asset, and expresses her doubts about Lucia's reliability to Philip.

Henry observes a neighbor's house with his telescope, and sneaks in to play Intellivision while they are gone, something his parents had forbidden him from doing.

== Production ==
=== Development ===
In March 2014, FX confirmed that the seventh episode of the season would be titled "Arpanet", and that it would be written by Joshua Brand, and directed by Kevin Dowling. This was Brand's fifth writing credit, and Dowling's first directing credit.

== Reception ==
=== Viewers ===
In its original American broadcast, "Arpanet" was seen by an estimated 1.18 million household viewers with a 0.4 in the 18–49 demographics. This means that 0.4 percent of all households with televisions watched the episode. This was a slight decrease in viewership from the previous episode, which was watched by 1.21 million household viewers with a 0.4 in the 18–49 demographics.

=== Critical reviews ===
"Arpanet" received critical acclaim. Eric Goldman of IGN gave the episode a "great" 8.8 out of 10 and wrote in his verdict, "The Americans looking at the beginning of what will become the internet is an inherently interesting idea that it was fun to see the show explore. Meanwhile, Nina's dangerous situation taking that polygraph test and Philip once again forced to kill to protect a mission was a reminder of just how perilous a life these people are living and how it can come crashing down at any time."

Alan Sepinwall of HitFix wrote, "Machines also don't have the qualms with killing that men do, but in 1982 the dirty work still has to be done by complicated men and women like Philip and Nina, and Andrew Larrick. And that's hard on all of them, but very entertaining for us." The A.V. Club gave the episode an "A–" grade and wrote, "'Arpanet' is marvelously tense throughout, even when the characters are almost too stupid to be believed. Hell, the episode gains tension just from watching Henry sit around in a house the neighbors have left empty, playing Intellivision."

Matt Zoller Seitz of Vulture gave the episode a 4 star rating out of 5 and wrote, "'ARPANET' is a tight, propulsive episode of The Americans, a show that produces little else. Written by Joshua Brand and directed by Kevin Dowling, it also moves the story forward politically, moving it deeper into the '80s and closer to the end of the Cold War—not that anyone involved in this tale has any idea that there will be an end." Carla Day of TV Fanatic gave the episode a 4.6 star rating out of 5 and wrote, "Nina was by far the best part of 'Arpanet'. I love her anytime she's on the screen. She's turned into quite a force to be reckoned with. She has gone from a woman forced to betray her homeland to a woman who has men on both side wrapped around her finger."
