= Operation Chronicle (The Americans) =

- The Americans episode
- Episode no.: Season 2 Episode 12
- Directed by: Andrew Bernstein
- Written by: Joel Fields; Joe Weisberg
- Production code: BDU212
- Original air date: May 14, 2014
- Running time: 44 minutes

Guest appearances
- Richard Thomas as Frank Gaad; Lev Gorn as Arkady Ivanovich; Kelly AuCoin as Pastor Tim; John Carroll Lynch as Fred; Lee Tergesen as Andrew Larrick; Costa Ronin as Oleg Igorevich Burov; Peter Von Berg as Vasili Nikolaevich; Owen Campbell as Jared Connors

Episode chronology
← Previous "Stealth"	Next → "Echo"
- The Americans season 2

"Operation Chronicle" is the twelfth episode of the second season of the American television drama series The Americans, and the 25th overall episode of the series. It originally aired on FX in the United States on May 14, 2014.

== Plot ==
After receiving Kate's message, Elizabeth proceeds to get Jared out and Philip stays to guard the house and the children. Paige questions Elizabeth about leaving late at night and she comes up with an implausible story about a client emergency at the travel agency. Paige is upset because Elizabeth had promised to help her pack for her upcoming church protest trip. After getting the children to sleep, Philip goes to the basement to signal the centre. Afterward, he sees Paige, who is skeptical about their story, in the kitchen. Then Philip talks to Elizabeth on the phone, referring to Jared cryptically because he knows that Paige is listening in.

Elizabeth gets Jared into the car and drives off, not knowing that Larrick (Lee Tergesen) is already using a tracking device to monitor him. She explains that she worked with his parents and he needs to leave the country because he is in danger. After making him change clothes, she gets him onto a train toward extraction. Larrick loses track of them but quickly deduces that he will be on a train. He manages to discover Jared is going to Upstate New York. Jared arrives at the cabin where Elizabeth recuperated from her injuries, with Larrick just behind and on his trail. Philip and Elizabeth, still unaware that Larrick has left Nicaragua, worry that the things that happened to Jared could one day happen to Paige and Henry.

Stan, who promised to get Nina out, buys a used car. When he returns to the safe house, he finds Arkady (Lev Gorn) with two thugs and a bruised Nina. Arkady tells Stan that Nina will be tried and executed in Moscow if he does not get them "Echo". Later, Stan, under the guise of a security review, gets Gaad to approve his checking out the stealth factory. Meanwhile, Philip and Elizabeth ask Fred to wear special shoes and wander into the secure area of the factory, so they can get samples of the radar-absorbing paint. Fred reluctantly agrees.

Martha surprises Clark with classified documents stolen from the FBI, saying that his office should know about Gaad's weak security practices. When Clark expresses concern about the risk, she tells him that she loves him and reveals that she knows about his toupée. Later, after sex, Martha wonders when they could have children. Clark tells her that children are definitely not for him.

Oleg (Costa Ronin) later sees Nina. He gives her a stack of cash, implying that she should leave as soon as Stan refuses to betray his country. During the field trip, Paige shares with Pastor Tim that she no longer trusts her parents. Stan visits the stealth factory that runs Echo.

== Production ==
The episode was written by Joel Fields and the series creator Joe Weisberg, and directed by Andrew Bernstein.

== Reception ==
The episode was watched by 1.27 million viewers and scored 0.4 ratings in 18–49 demographics, as per Nielsen ratings. The critics' review of the episode were positive. The A.V. Club gave the episode an A. Alan Sepinwall from Hitfix praised the episode saying "...it's been a fantastic ride so far". TV.com said "the hour reminded us how emotional needs provide the greatest fuel for action."
