= Behind the Red Door (The Americans) =

- The Americans episode
- Episode no.: Season 2 Episode 6
- Directed by: Charlotte Sieling
- Written by: Melissa James Gibson
- Production code: BDU206
- Original air date: April 2, 2014
- Running time: 48 minutes

Guest appearances
- Richard Thomas as Frank Gaad; Lev Gorn as Arkady Ivanovich; Costa Ronin as Oleg Burov; Aimee Carrero as Lucia; Lee Tergesen as Andrew Larrick; Nick Bailey as Carl; Wrenn Schmidt as Kate; Daniel Flaherty as Matthew Beeman; Luke Robertson as Records Clerk; Margo Martindale as Claudia

Episode chronology
| ← Previous "The Deal" | Next → "Arpanet" |
- The Americans season 2

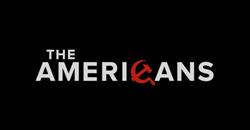
Logo for the TV show

"Behind the Red Door" is the sixth episode of the second season of the American television drama series The Americans, and the 19th overall episode of the series. It originally aired on FX in the United States on April 2, 2014.

== Plot ==
Claudia (Margo Martindale) gives Elizabeth and Philip instructions on how to kill Larrick (Lee Tergesen) if they discover he is Emmett and Leanne's killer. Meanwhile, Stan meets Oleg in a safe house and is given three days to meet Oleg's demands. Later that day, Elizabeth and Philip meet Larrick, and he claims he wanted to kill Emmett and Leanne, but he did not get to them first. Elizabeth and Philip believe him. Later that night, Elizabeth seduces Philip, wanting to meet "Clark", but Philip is confused and somewhat offended, and backs off. At the same time, Stan is home eating dinner while his wife and son talk about the death of John Belushi. He later goes to the copy room and goes through Oleg's surveillance logs.

Elizabeth keeps pressing Philip about Clark, but is interrupted when they discover Paige quit the volleyball team, and they need to meet Kate. Philip tells her he plans to kill Larrick after a mission and asks that his family remain unexposed. Kate accepts their request, and tells Elizabeth that Lucia needs to help her get into the Capitol. Lucia seduces the congressman's assistant, Carl, and lures him into the office to have sex while Elizabeth steals the files. After the success, Elizabeth tells Lucia to kill the assistant so nothing will be traced back to her.

Stan goes to Gaad's home, and tells him Nina has been compromised. Gaad refuses to hear anything so he will not have to lie if he is forced to testify before a congressional committee. Oleg meets Arkady and tells him the ARPANET is the future. When asked by Arkady if Stan will meet Oleg's demands, he replies "50-50". Elizabeth seduces Philip in his Clark costume and he sensually kisses her. Disappointed, she demands to see the animal Clark is instead of Philip's sensitive nature, and he relents by viciously having sex with her. He shouts at her "Is that what you want?", to her shock. Philip goes to the bathroom disgusted with himself and rips off his wig while Elizabeth is on the bed sobbing.

Lucia is with Carl and he says he wants her to meet his family. He prepares some heroin and she poisons it when he leaves the room to get her some water. Immediately after injecting the drug, he chokes on his vomit and dies. Elizabeth comes back home and Paige tells her she quit volleyball because she had more fun at church. Paige asks her parents to stop by sometime. Elizabeth later goes to Philip and asks "Are you mad at me?" Philip tells her he is not, and asks her about Lucia.

Stan tells Nina that Oleg knows about them. Stan tells her that she will have to take a polygraph test to be exfiltrated, and she tells him she is done and storms out. Larrick confronts Philip at a mission, and Elizabeth asks Claudia whom to search next, and she replies "me". She told Elizabeth she was lonely and was in a relationship, and may have inadvertently led her lover to Emmett and Leanne. Claudia claims she told them to pursue the killer so they could remain safe from her. She also tells Elizabeth she is lucky to have Philip in her life before they finally part. The episode ends with Elizabeth driving away.

== Production ==
=== Development ===
In March 2014, FX confirmed that the sixth episode of the season would be titled "Behind the Red Door", and that it would be written by Melissa James Gibson, and directed by Charlotte Sieling. This was Gibson's fourth writing credit, and Sieling's first directing credit.

== Reception ==
=== Viewers ===
In its original American broadcast, "Behind the Red Door" was seen by an estimated 1.21 million household viewers with a 0.4 in the 18–49 demographics. This means that 0.4 percent of all households with televisions watched the episode. This was a 12% decrease in viewership from the previous episode, which was watched by 1.36 million household viewers with a 0.4 in the 18–49 demographics.

=== Critical reviews ===
"Behind the Red Door" received critical acclaim. Eric Goldman of IGN gave the episode an "amazing" 9 out of 10 and wrote in his verdict, "This week's episode of The Americans got even more realistic and harsh with how the oft-idealized sex life of a spy would actually make things really, really screwed up – especially if you were actually in an ongoing relationship. It wasn't comfortable to watch what happened with Elizabeth and Philip, but it sure was compelling."

Alan Sepinwall of HitFix wrote, "Things that once seemed like fiction have become real, and vice versa, and everyone is getting deeper into unfortunately circumstances that will be very hard to escape. Such a roll this show's on right now." The A.V. Club gave the episode an "A" grade and wrote, "Unlike last week, Elizabeth and Philip spend most of this episode together, working toward the same goals, and because of that, I found 'Behind The Red Door' to be an improvement on last week's already stellar episode. It also has a heavy focus on the series' female characters, which I always appreciate."

Matt Zoller Seitz of Vulture gave the episode a 3 star rating out of 5 and wrote, "Things have gotten so complicated that you practically need a wall-size flow chart to keep track of everybody's motivations and multiple identities. You've got agents becoming double agents becoming triple agents and being pressured to become quadruple agents. You've got people pretending to be other people and occasionally pretending to be yet additional people within that second identity. It's a hall of mirrors in which everyone and everything reflects everyone and everything else. We have real people pretending to be fake people and carrying out treacherous agendas, but feeling real things as they perform, and feeling guilt and love while they perform." Carla Day of TV Fanatic gave the episode a 4.5 star rating out of 5 and wrote, "It's not easy being a spy. It's certainly not the glamorous life often portrayed in movies. The Americans has been building up to this point over the last season and a half. The Jennings are in a decent place in their marriage and are dealing with normal teenage rebellion with Paige. They are the best KGB operatives in the US and the stress of the job has begun to grate on them."
