= Behind the Red Door =

Behind the Red Door may refer to:

- Behind the Red Door (film), a 2003 English drama film
- Behind the Red Door (The Americans), an episode of The Americans
