= Blue Collar Boys =

Blue Collar Boys may refer to:

- Blue Collar Boys (film), a 2012 film by Mark Nistico
- "Blue Collar Boys", a song by Luke Combs on the 2019 album What You See Is What You Get
- "Blue Collar Boys", a song by Frank Foster
