= Martial Eagle (The Americans) =

- The Americans episode
- Episode no.: Season 2 Episode 9
- Directed by: Alik Sakharov
- Story by: Oliver North; Tracey Scott Wilson
- Teleplay by: Tracey Scott Wilson
- Production code: BDU209
- Original air date: April 23, 2014
- Running time: 47 minutes

Guest appearances
- Richard Thomas as Frank Gaad; Lev Gorn as Arkady Ivanovich; John Carroll Lynch as Fred; Lee Tergesen as Andrew Larrick; Kelly AuCoin as Pastor Tim; Karen Pittman as AA Leader

Episode chronology
← Previous "New Car"	Next → "Yousaf"
- The Americans season 2

"Martial Eagle" (named after the bird of prey with the same name, the martial eagle) is the ninth episode of the second season of the American television drama series The Americans, and the 22nd overall episode of the series. It originally aired on FX in the United States on April 23, 2014.

== Plot ==
Elizabeth and Philip infiltrate the Contra training base posing as septic system employees. Elizabeth assassinates their intended targets, while Philip takes photos of the training exercises. He is forced to kill three American personnel who stumble upon him. The Jennings later find that the truck driver they kidnapped for information and left tied up in the forest froze to death. Philip is upset by the unnecessary deaths.

The Jennings family attends a service at the church that runs Paige's youth program. They inadvertently learn that Paige has donated $600 of her savings to missionary activities. Neither of her parents approve of this gesture, especially Philip. Philip lashes out at Paige when they return home. Elizabeth awakens Paige in the middle of the night to do chores, telling her that being a grown up means having to do things even if you don't want to do them and not always getting what you want. Philip later meets Pastor Tim (Kelly AuCoin) and angrily asks him to stay away from his daughter. Pastor Tim responds by telling Philip he, too, can be saved before Philip walks out.

Stan receives the code-word clearance for the "Have Blue program". Three stealth aircraft scientists meet with Stan, and reveal that scientists all work separately and both Northrop and Lockheed are competing for the DoD contract for stealth aircraft. They also tell Stan about the date and location of a key meeting of the defense contractors. Stan meets Gaad, who has been summoned to testify in front of the committee for the murder of Vlad. Gaad is packing up his office, believing he will be fired shortly after the testimony due to his involvement in the murder. Stan also learns that the key meeting occurred on the same day as the unsolved murders of a family (actually KGB sleepers Emmett and Leanne and their daughter) and begins exploring a possible link between the events. He searches through the evidence from the murders but does not find anything of interest. Gaad later meets Arkady and threatens that if he is forced to testify he will reveal the information about hidden KGB agents to the press; Arkady listens politely but does not respond. Fred reveals to Philip that he and other stealth scientists have been summoned to a meeting by the FBI but does not know why; it turns out to be for Stan's investigation. Stan questions several attendees of the meeting, including Fred, who insists that he would "never betray his country". Stan seems skeptical. Stan later arrives home to learn his wife Sandra is considering an affair with a man she met in est. Stan asks if Sandra is leaving him, and she walks out.

Philip plays a doctored tape to Martha to poison her relationship with Gaad, and tells her that someone in her office is leaking information about the stealth aircraft project. They start to get intimate, but Philip stops her, saying he is drunk and upset. Meanwhile, Elizabeth attends an Alcoholics Anonymous meeting to befriend a Northrop employee and glean stealth technology information from her.

== Production ==
The story for the episode was written by Oliver North and Tracey Scott Wilson, while Wilson wrote the teleplay. The episode was directed by Alik Sakharov. North was involved due to his experience and knowledge about American government's covert support of Contras in Nicaragua.

== Reception ==
The episode was watched by 1.37 million viewers, as per Nielsen ratings. The reviews for the episode were positive. The A.V. Club rated the episode an A−. Alan Sepinwall from Hitfix reviewed the episode positively.
