= The Feminine Touch =

The Feminine Touch may refer to:

- The Feminine Touch (1941 film), an American film starring Rosalind Russell and Don Ameche
- The Feminine Touch (1956 film), a British film starring George Baker and Belinda Lee
- The Feminine Touch (1995 film), an American film starring Paige Turco, Dirk Benedict and George Segal
