= The Magic of David Copperfield V: The Statue of Liberty Disappears (The Americans) =

- The Americans episode
- Episode no.: Season 4 Episode 8
- Directed by: Matthew Rhys
- Written by: Stephen Schiff
- Cinematography by: Alex Nepomniaschy
- Editing by: Amanda Pollack
- Production code: BDU408
- Original air date: May 4, 2016
- Running time: 51 minutes

Guest appearances
- Kelly AuCoin as Pastor Tim; Vera Cherny as Tatiana Evgenyevna Vyazemtseva; Ruthie Ann Miles as Young Hee Seong; Karen Pittman as Lisa; Scott William Winters as Lawrence; Suzy Jane Hunt as Alice; Aaron Roman Weiner as Agent Brooks; Margo Martindale as Claudia; Frank Langella as Gabriel

Episode chronology
← Previous "Travel Agents"	Next → "The Day After"
- The Americans season 4

"The Magic of David Copperfield V: The Statue of Liberty Disappears" is the eighth episode of the fourth season of the American period spy drama television series The Americans. It is the 47th overall episode of the series and was written by co-executive producer Stephen Schiff, and directed by main cast member Matthew Rhys. It was released on FX on May 4, 2016.

The title of the episode was a reference to David Copperfield's 1983 television special where he made the Statue of Liberty "disappear". It may also be a reference to the "disappearances" shown in the episode and/or the difficulty involved in making something huge, because the episode itself was also set in 1983. Copperfield and the stunt itself are shown in the episode.

The series is set during the Cold War and follows Elizabeth and Philip Jennings, two Soviet KGB intelligence officers posing as an American married couple living in Falls Church, a Virginia suburb of Washington, D.C., with their American-born children Paige and Henry. It also explores the conflict between Washington's FBI office and the KGB Rezidentura there, from the perspectives of agents on both sides, including the Jennings' neighbor Stan Beeman, an FBI agent working in counterintelligence.

According to Nielsen Media Research, the episode was seen by an estimated 1.02 million household viewers and gained a 0.3 ratings share among adults aged 18–49. The episode was widely praised for its performances, writing, directing and atmosphere. At the 68th Primetime Emmy Awards, Margo Martindale won Outstanding Guest Actress in a Drama Series for the episode, while Matthew Rhys and Keri Russell received nominations for Outstanding Lead Actor in a Drama Series and Outstanding Lead Actress in a Drama Series, respectively.

== Plot ==
Philip (Matthew Rhys), Martha (Alison Wright) and Gabriel (Frank Langella) silently awake in the morning to start their departure from the safe house. They drive her to an airfield, where the airplane will take Martha. Before departing, Martha tells Philip "don't be alone" and kisses him goodbye before leaving the United States.

With Martha out of the country, Philip becomes more present in his family's life. He also convinces Elizabeth (Keri Russell) to hang out more often with Young Hee (Ruthie Ann Miles), so she decides to accompany her to the theater to watch Tender Mercies. They develop their friendship, and they decide to sneak back to watch The Outsiders. Philip is visited by Stan (Noah Emmerich), who laments his incoming divorce, as well as the lack of progress in the FBI. He later meets with Gabriel, who informs him that his son has been sent back to Russia from Afghanistan, to Philip's relief. Philip asks for Martha to meet her parents in Cuba, but Gabriel refuses.

Elizabeth attends an EST session, which surprises Philip. However, Elizabeth considers that the sessions are only manipulating people to sign for more, deeming it "very American." This gets Philip and Elizabeth to heavily argue about their life, which is interrupted when Gabriel calls them. He informs them that Martha has landed safely in Cuba, after which she will be taken to Russia. The following day, Paige (Holly Taylor) tells Elizabeth that she skipped Bible studies because she can't get herself "in the mood" to talk. Elizabeth angrily chastises her, saying she will continue attending and maintain a good relationship with Pastor Tim (Kelly AuCoin) and Alice (Suzy Jane Hunt), reminding her that it is her fault that they found themselves in this problem.

Gabriel converses with Claudia (Margo Martindale), expressing his frustration with Philip and Elizabeth and how everything is going out of control. However, Claudia is not moved by his story, claiming they must get themselves out of their problems. Elizabeth visits Lisa (Karen Pittman), who has resorted to alcoholism. Maurice has left her and taken all their money and she is convinced she needs to report "Jack" to the police in hopes of gaining immunity. After failing to convince her, Elizabeth is forced to kill her. She reports this to Philip and Gabriel, showing signs of stress. Realizing their situation, Gabriel decides that they need time off from operations, promising to call Centre. They go home, telling Paige and Henry (Keidrich Sellati) that they are finally going to Epcot.

Seven months later, while playing mini golf, Pastor Tim and Alice reveal to Paige that they are expecting a baby. After Paige is dropped off at home, she reports their activities to Philip and Elizabeth. Stan visits Gaad (Richard Thomas) at his house, fired after the recent events at the FBI. Before Gaad leaves for a trip in Thailand, he advises Stan to watch out for Oleg (Costa Ronin), reminding him that he cannot lose sight of who these people are.

== Production ==
=== Development ===
In April 2016, FX confirmed that the eighth episode of the season would be titled "The Magic of David Copperfield V: The Statue of Liberty Disappears", and that it would be written by co-executive producer Stephen Schiff, and directed by main cast member Matthew Rhys. This was Schiff's sixth writing credit, and Rhys's first directing credit.

=== Filming ===
Filming for the episode wrapped by January 20, 2016.

== Reception ==
=== Viewers ===
In its original American broadcast, "The Magic of David Copperfield V: The Statue of Liberty Disappears" was seen by an estimated 1.02 million household viewers with a 0.3 in the 18-49 demographics. This means that 0.3 percent of all households with televisions watched the episode. This was a 13% increase in viewership from the previous episode, which was watched by 0.90 million household viewers with a 0.2 in the 18-49 demographics.

=== Critical reviews ===
"The Magic of David Copperfield V: The Statue of Liberty Disappears" was widely praised. The review aggregator website Rotten Tomatoes reported an 100% approval rating for the episode, based on 18 reviews. The site's consensus states: "'The Magic of David Copperfield V: The Statue of Liberty Disappears' offers unexpected turns, a daring time leap, and ferocious family dynamics, all beautifully performed and written."

Eric Goldman of IGN gave the episode an "amazing" 9.5 out of 10 and wrote in his verdict, "An introspective yet eventful episode of The Americans found the Jennings pushed to their limit – and Gabriel finally having to also see that was the case. It was especially fascinating seeing the different sides of Elizabeth here, as one assignment, with Young Hee, allowed her to simply relax and have fun at the movies, while another required her to brutally murder another woman she'd once had a friendly rapport with. Even her trip to EST – itself an interesting moment – took a turn when she laughed about how 'It's very American, the whole thing,' to an angry Philip. It seems almost simplistic at this point to call her an 'anti-hero' given all these nuances, but it's episodes like this that again underline that she and Philip are living dark, complicated lives that ask so much of them over and over again. And this time, Gabriel decided they'd been pushed too far. I hope they enjoyed that trip to Epcot though, because there's no way this break can last forever."

Erik Adams of The A.V. Club gave the episode an "A" grade and wrote, "In a great flourish, The Americans makes The Jennings' lives as spies disappear. The magic of 'The Magic Of David Copperfield V: The Statue Of Liberty Disappears' is in transforming Elizabeth, Philip, Paige, and Henry into the happy family they've always pretended to be."

Alan Sepinwall of HitFix wrote, "Even by this series' remarkable standards, 'The Magic of David Copperfield' is a wonder, and the actors better than they've ever been before." Anthony Breznican of Entertainment Weekly wrote, "We say goodbye to Martha without saying anything at all."

Mike Hale of The New York Times wrote, "Martha's safe removal didn’t seem like a given last week, but it went smoothly, and the show quickly refocused itself. While the FBI continued to look for Martha, not knowing that she was gone, and Philip and Elizabeth dealt with the repercussions, Paige re-emerged as the greatest existential threat to the Jennings household." Genevieve Koski of Vulture gave the episode a perfect 5 star rating out of 5 and wrote, "From its cumbersome title on down, 'The Magic of David Copperfield V: The Statue of Liberty Disappears' is fixated on the symbols and perceptions of Americanness — and consequently delivers the best episode of the season, one that re-centers the series at just the right moment."

Ben Travers of IndieWire gave the episode an "A" grade and wrote, "With five episodes remaining in Season 4, it's apt the attention has shifted back to Paige. Martha was a worthy distraction, but this is the season danger, and nothing is more dangerous — as Elizabeth pointed out — than a teenager with a secret." Matt Brennan of Slant Magazine wrote, "In 'The Magic of David Copperfield V: The Statue of Liberty Disappears,' after all, another lady vanishes, and in her wake what might have seemed like liberty turns out to be a prison, one of the characters' own design."

Alec Bojalad of Den of Geek scored the episode five out of five, and wrote, "Good God a lot happens in this episode. The scale of 'The Magic of David Copperfield V' is relatively staggering for The Americans. But it's also at times strangely quiet and intimate. The dramatic, easy-going jazz at work here combined with occasional crash of two characters finally using their outdoor voices on each other make 'The Magic of David Copperfield V: The Statue of Liberty Disappears' an unexpected entrant into the best The Americans episode discussion." Amy Amatangelo of Paste gave the episode an 8 out of 10 and wrote, "I might not be on board with the mid-episode time jump, but with only five episodes left this season, I can't wait to see what happens next. Things have apparently been status quo for seven months, but we know that can't last."

=== Accolades ===
At the 68th Primetime Emmy Awards, Rhys and Russell submitted the episode to support their nominations for Outstanding Lead Actor in a Drama Series and Outstanding Lead Actress in a Drama Series, while Margo Martindale received a nomination for Outstanding Guest Actress in a Drama Series. Martindale would win the award, while Rhys would lose to Rami Malek for Mr. Robot and Russell would lose to Tatiana Maslany for Orphan Black.
