= Ed Setrakian =

American film, television and theatre actor (born 1928)

- Born: October 1, 1928 (age 97); Anawalt, West Virginia, U.S.
- Occupations: Film, television and theatre actor

Ed Setrakian (born October 1, 1928) is an American film, television and theatre actor. He is known for appearing in the films Tough Guys Don't Dance and Zodiac and the television programs The Sopranos (in the episode Where's Johnny?) and Person of Interest (in two episodes as Grifoni). He has also played four different roles in the Law & Order franchise.

== Filmography ==
Year	Title	Role	Notes
1971	The Pursuit of Happiness	Policeman	
1975	Three Days of the Condor	Customer	
1976	Dragonfly	Contractor	
1976	The Next Man	U.N. Reporter	
1984	The Pope of Greenwich Village	1st Inspector	
1987	Tough Guys Don't Dance	Lawyer	
1989	Cookie	Mike Fusco	
1989	The Plot Against Harry	Vitale	
1990	Men of Respect	Dr. Edwards	
1991	The Hard Way	Chief Villain	
2000	Astoria	Demos	
2005	The Great New Wonderful	Henry Hillerman	(segment "Judy's Story")
2007	Zodiac	Al Hyman	
2009	Tickling Leo	Oscar Szoras	
2009	Under New Management	Msgr. Paulie Bono	
2009	A Secret Promise	Mr. Olivetti	
2012	Blue Collar Boys	Gene	
