= Amherst Ballet Theatre Company =

American dance school

The Amherst Ballet Theatre Company is a dance school located at 65 Sunderland Road in Amherst, Massachusetts. It is a non-profit (501(c)3) organization overseen by a volunteer board of directors and administered by an executive director. Though it has a few classes in Contemporary and Jazz dance, the preponderance of its classes teach the Vaganova syllabus of ballet. The former home was 29 Strong Street, Amherst, Massachusetts. This changed in the summer of 2025.

== History ==
Amherst Ballet School was founded in 1971, by Therese Brady Donohue, as a private, for-profit business. Classes were based on the syllabus of London's Royal Academy of Dancing. In 1976 Donohue founded the non-profit Amherst Ballet Theatre Company to provide for a greater range of performance opportunities for the students and the community. The for-profit Amherst Ballet School and the non-profit Amherst Ballet Theater Company existed as separate entities until 2000 when they were merged into a single non-profit organization.

Between 2003 and 2011 the executive director was Catherine Fair. In 2012, Sueann Townsend was hired as executive director.

== Historic Artistic collaborations ==
Amherst Ballet works to engage with the artistic community. In its years, it has collaborated with local artists—the Arabic musical ensemble, Layali; the Pioneer Valley Symphony, conducted by Paul Phillips; Rebecca Guay and Jane Yolen to produce a ballet based on their book The Barefoot Book of Ballet Stories; and Jane Wald, director of the Emily Dickinson Museum to produce a ballet based on the life of Emily Dickinson, called Emily of Amherst

== Community outreach ==
Amherst Ballet works engage with the community at large. It believes that ballet is not just for those who might make it a profession. Amherst Ballet believes that ballet is for everybody, regardless of age, body type, or ability. It has developed classes for adults, whether absolute beginners, or people who gave up dance long ago and wished they hadn't.

Amherst Ballet also brings in internationally regarded master teachers to work with all students, regardless of a student's expertise. It brought Ilya Kuznetsov, master teacher of Moscow's Bolshoi Ballet Academy, to work with students from the cities of Springfield, Holyoke, and Greenfield—students who might not otherwise get the opportunity to study with such masters. Amherst Ballet believes that ballet education is not just for those who might excel at ballet in the future; ballet education is for anybody who wants to enjoy the beauty of dance. As the artistic director of Amherst Ballet, Sueann Townsend, said, "Everybody deserves to have a participatory aesthetic in their life."

== Notable graduates ==
Paige Turco - actress in Teenage Mutant Ninja Turtles II, The Guiding Light, American Gothic, NYPD Blue, and NCIS.
