= Paige Turco =

American actress (born 1965)

- Born: Jean Paige Turco; May 17, 1965 (age 61); Boston, Massachusetts, U.S.
- Occupation: Actress
- Years active: 1987–2020
- Spouse: Jason O'Mara (m. 2003; div. 2017)
- Children: 1

Jean Paige Turco (born May 17, 1965) is an American actress, who portrayed April O'Neil in Teenage Mutant Ninja Turtles II: The Secret of the Ooze (1991) and Teenage Mutant Ninja Turtles III (1993). Other credits include ongoing appearances in the soap operas Guiding Light (1987–1989) and All My Children (1989–1992), as well as starring main cast roles in Winnetka Road (1994), American Gothic (1995–1998), The Agency (2001–2003), Big Shots (2007–2008) and the first six seasons (2014–2019) as Dr. Abigail Griffin in the post-apocalyptic drama series The 100. Her last film role was in a chapter of the 2020 anthology horror movie Books of Blood, while her last television role was a special return appearance in "The Last War", the 2020 series finale of The 100.

== Early life ==
Turco was born May 17, 1965, to Joyce Jean (Jodoin) and David Vincent Turco in Boston, Massachusetts. At one year old her mother moved them to Springfield, Massachusetts, where she was raised, after the death of her father. She is of Italian, French-Canadian and English ancestry. She took ballet lessons as a little girl and planned to become a classical ballerina. She attended the Walnut Hill School in Natick, Massachusetts, graduating in 1983 and performed as a soloist at the New England Dance Conservatory, the Amherst Ballet Theatre Company, and the Western Massachusetts Ballet Company. An ankle injury ended the possibility of professional ballet. She remarked later, "I couldn't even go to the ballet anymore. It was too painful." Turco graduated from Bay Path College in Longmeadow, Massachusetts, in 1987 and majored in drama at the University of Connecticut.

== Career ==
In 1987, Turco made her television acting debut as Dinah Marler in the CBS soap opera Guiding Light (1987–1989), She appeared as Melanie Cortlandt in the ABC soap opera All My Children (1989–1992). She played the role of April O'Neil in Teenage Mutant Ninja Turtles II: The Secret of the Ooze (1991), and later in Teenage Mutant Ninja Turtles III (1993).

In 1994, she played Terry Mears co-starring opposite Catherine Hicks in NBC primetime soap, Winnetka Road (1994). The following year, Turco starred as Gail Emory in another short-lived series, CBS's cult classic American Gothic (1995–1998). She had recurring role as Officer Abby Sullivan in NYPD Blue (1996–1997), and again on Party of Five (1997–1998) as Annie Mott, a single mother who is also a recovering alcoholic. She starred as graphic artist Terri Lowell, in the CBS drama series The Agency (2001–2003).

In 2006, Turco had a recurring role as science teacher Mrs. Nell Turbody in the third season of Rescue Me (2006), and was a regular cast member in the ABC series Big Shots (2007–2008), portraying Lisbeth, the ex-wife of Dylan McDermott's character, Duncan Collinsworth, a cosmetics company CEO. Turco co-starred alongside Mark Wahlberg and Greg Kinnear, playing Carol Vermeil, the wife of Dick Vermeil, in the film Invincible (2006). She worked with Dwayne Johnson in the Walt Disney picture The Game Plan (2007). She also played the romantic interest of her then real-life husband Jason O'Mara in Episode 15 of Life on Mars (2009).

She appeared in multiple episodes of Damages (2009), and guest-starred in The Good Wife (2010), Blue Bloods (2011), and Law & Order: Special Victims Unit (2001 & 2011). She also appeared as Zoe Morgan in a recurring role in Person of Interest (2011–2015).

In 2014, she was cast as the lead character's wife Linda Pride in CBS's NCIS: New Orleans (2014 & 2020).

From March 2014, Turco starred as Doctor Abigail Griffin, in the main cast for the first six seasons of The CW post-apocalyptic drama series, The 100, from 2014–2019, returning in 2020 for the series finale episode. She worked alongside Eliza Taylor who played her daughter Clarke, also Henry Ian Cusick, Marie Avgeropoulos, and Lindsey Morgan.

== Personal life ==
Turco is Roman Catholic. She was married to Irish actor Jason O'Mara from 2003 to 2017. They have one child together, David (born in February 2004; named after Turco's father, who died when she was an infant).

== Filmography ==
=== Film ===
Year	Title	Role	Notes
1990	Teenage Mutant Ninja Turtles (1990 film)	April O'Neil	
1991	Teenage Mutant Ninja Turtles II: The Secret of the Ooze	April O'Neil	
1993	Teenage Mutant Ninja Turtles III	April O'Neil	
1994	Dead Funny	Louise	
1995	The Feminine Touch	Jennifer Barron	Direct-to-video
1995	The Pompatus of Love	Gina	
1996	Vibrations	Lisa	Direct-to-video
1998	Dark Tides	Sara	
1999	Claire Makes It Big	Bronwyn	Short film
2000	R2PC: Road to Park City	Herself	
2000	Urbania	Cassandra	
2000	Astoria	Elena	
2001	Dead Dog	Perri	
2003	Rhinoceros Eyes	Fran	
2006	Waltzing Anna	Barbara Rhoades	
2006	Invincible	Carol Vermeil	
2007	The Game Plan	Karen Kelly	
2007	The Favor	Caroline	
2009	The Stepfather	Jackie Kerns	
2010	The Secrets of the Mountain	Dana James	
2020	Books of Blood	Nicole	

=== Television ===
Year	Title	Role	Notes
1987–1989	Guiding Light	Dinah Chamberlain	36 Episodes
1989–1991	All My Children	Melanie 'Lanie' Cortlandt Rampal	80 Episodes
1994	Winnetka Road	Terry Mears	Main cast
1995–1996	American Gothic	Gail Emory	Main cast
1996–1997	NYPD Blue	Officer Abby Sullivan	Recurring role (seasons 4–5)
1997–1998	Party of Five	Annie Mott	Recurring role (season 4)
2000	Runaway Virus	Jenny Blanchard	TV movie
2000	The Fugitive	Laura Chereaux	Episode: "Pilot"
2001	Law & Order: Special Victims Unit	Pam Adler	Episode: "Ridicule"
2001–2003	The Agency	Terri Lowell	Main cast
2006	Women in Law	Carolyn Fordham	Episode: "Pilot"
2006	Rescue Me	Nell Turbody	4 episodes
2007–2008	Big Shots	Lisbeth Hill	Main cast
2009	Taking Chance	Stacey Strobl	TV movie
2009	Life on Mars	Colleen McManus	Episode: "All the Young Dudes"
2009	Damages	Christine Purcell	Recurring role
2010	Secrets of the Mountain	Dana James	TV movie
2010	The Good Wife	Caroline Wilder	Episode: "Unplugged"
2011	Blue Bloods	Detective Ryan	Episode: "My Funny Valentine"
2011	Law & Order: Special Victims Unit	Kathleen Raines	Episode: "Blood Brothers"
2011–2016	Person of Interest	Zoe Morgan	Recurring role
2014–2020	The 100	Dr. Abigail Griffin / Simone Lightbourne VII / The Judge	Main cast (seasons 1–6), special appearance (season 7)
2014	NCIS	Linda Pride	Episode: "Crescent City"
2014, 2020	NCIS: New Orleans	Linda Pride	2 episodes
2018	Separated at Birth	Elizabeth Marshall	TV movie
