= Trenches (web series) =

- Genre: Sci-Fi
- Created by: Shane Felux
- Directed by: Shane Felux
- Starring: Aaron Mathias; Mercy Malick; Lev Gorn; Hong Chau; Daz Crawford; Scott Nankivel
- Country of origin: United States
- Original language: English
- No. of seasons: 1
- No. of episodes: 10

Production
- Producer: Shane Felux
- Running time: 5-7 minutes

Original release
- Network: Crackle
- Release: February 16 – March 5, 2009

Trenches is an American science fiction web series directed and produced by Shane Felux, creator of Star Wars: Revelations. With a budget of $250,000, Trenches premiered on Crackle on February 16, 2009. The show was written by Dawn Cowings, Sarah Yaworsky, Peter Gamble Robinson and Ian Shorr. Aaron Mathias, Mercy Malick, Lev Gorn, Hong Chau, Daz Crawford, and Scott Nankivel are the main cast of the series. New episodes were streamed on Monday, Wednesday, and Friday through March 5, 2009.

Trenches was originally produced in 2007 for Disney's Stage 9, a web video venture company, but has since been licensed to Crackle. The program has an official website with complete information at TrenchesOnline.com.

== Plot ==
Locked in a grueling war on a backwater planet, two enemies find themselves abandoned by their own. They must put aside their differences and work together if they are to survive. They better do it quickly - they are not alone on this rock.

== Cast ==
- Aaron Mathias as Lt. Andrews
- Mercy Malick as Cpt. Racine
- Lev Gorn as Cpl. Traina
- Hong Chau as Spc. Wing
- Daz Crawford as Sgt. Verro
- Scott Nankivel as Pfc. Janeski

== Episodes ==
No.	Title	Release date	Ref.
1	Fubar	February 16, 2009	
2	Behind Enemy Lines	February 16, 2009	
3	Field Promotion	February 16, 2009	
4	Dead Reckoning	February 18, 2009	
5	Shallow Grave	February 22, 2009	
6	Whisky Tango Foxtrot	February 24, 2009	
7	The Suck	February 26, 2009	
8	Snafu	March 1, 2009	
9	Defecation Hits the Oscillation	March 3, 2009	
10	Charlie Foxtrot	March 5, 2009	
