= Laura Day =

American writer (born 1959)

Laura Day (born March 22, 1959) is an American writer who is the author of several self-help books, focusing on intuition. She also gives financial advice as an "intuitionist". She resides in New York City.

== Career ==
The book Practical Intuition, which was featured on The Oprah Winfrey Show, became a New York Times bestseller. In 2001, The Circle: How the Power of a Single Wish Can Change Your Life followed. In 2006, Day came out with Welcome to Your Crisis: How to Use the Power of Crisis to Create the Life You Want, which launched with a book party at the restaurant Bette co-hosted by actress Uma Thurman, Ryan Kavanaugh and agent Kevin Huvane.

She speaks regularly both in the U.S. and abroad, and has appeared on CNN, Fox News, Good Morning America, The View and The Oprah Winfrey Show.

Day calls herself "intuitive" rather than "psychic," saying: "I just get a sense of the right thing to do."

== Personal life ==
Day is married to screenwriter Stephen Schiff.

== Bibliography ==
- (1996) Practical Intuition. ISBN 0-7679-0034-0
- (1997) Practical Intuition for Success. ISBN 0-7225-3706-9
- (1998) Practical Intuition in Love. ISBN 0-06-017578-8
- (2001) The Circle: How The Power of a Single Wish Can Change Your Life. ISBN 1-58542-116-2
- (2006) Welcome to Your Crisis: How to Use the Power of Crisis to Create the Life You Want. ISBN 0-316-16724-X
- (2009) How to Rule the World from Your Couch. ISBN 1-4391-1820-5
