= Astoria (film) =

- Directed by: Nick Efteriades
- Written by: Nick Efteriades
- Produced by: Jamie Dakoyannis; Athena Efter
- Starring: Rick Stear; Ed Setrakian; Joseph D'Onofrio; Paige Turco; Geraldine LiBrandi
- Cinematography: Elia Lyssy
- Edited by: Stuart Emanuel
- Music by: Nikos Papazoglou
- Production companies: Astoria Partners; Marevan Pictures
- Release dates: 10 March 2000 (Santa Barbara Film Festival); 5 April 2002 (US)
- Running time: 103 minutes
- Country: United States
- Language: English

Astoria is a 2000 American drama film directed by Nick Efteriades, starring Rick Stear, Ed Setrakian, Joseph D'Onofrio, Paige Turco and Geraldine LiBrandi.

== Cast ==
- Rick Stear as Alex
- Ed Setrakian as Demos
- Joseph D'Onofrio as Theo
- Paige Turco as Elena
- Geraldine LiBrandi as Soula
- Steven J. Christopher as Lakis
- Yanni Sfinias as Mitsos
- Gregory Sims as George
- Stelio Savante as Nick
- Chelsea Altman as Betty

== Release ==
The film premiered at the Santa Barbara International Film Festival on 10 March 2000. The film was released in theatres on 5 April 2002.

== Reception ==
Lawrence Van Gelder of The New York Times wrote that while Efteriades "may not have generated many sparks", with his "affection for Astoria and its people", he has "given his tale a warm glow". Gene Seymour of Newsday rated the film 3 stars out of 5 and wrote that while "the verbiage grows quite thick in patches" and "the story itself is fairly predictable", there are "intriguing variations of light and shadow that, while not exactly freshening the coming-of-age conventions, add deft touches of polish and grit."

Maitland McDonagh of TV Guide rated the film 2.5 stars out of 5 and wrote that while the film is "efficiently directed and acted", it is a "very familiar tale", and "it's hard to feel its pull". Todd McCarthy of Variety wrote that the film "lacks the originality and vitality required of an indie to make it in the real world."
