= Stephen Schiff =

American writer

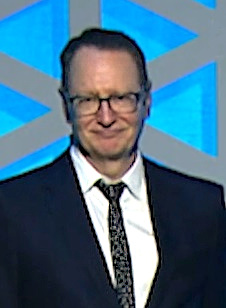
- Schiff at the Peabody Awards 2019
- Born: Detroit, Michigan, U.S.
- Occupations: Screenwriter; producer; journalist
- Awards: Golden Globe, Pulitzer Prize finalist, two Writers Guild of America Awards and two additional nominations, Writers Guild of America Richard B. Jablow Award, Peabody Award, two Emmy Award nominations, Critics Choice Award, American Film Institute Award, Television Critics Association Award, Producers Guild Award

Stephen Schiff is an American screenwriter, producer, and journalist. He is best known for his work at The New Yorker and Vanity Fair, his screenplays for Lolita, True Crime, and Wall Street: Money Never Sleeps, and his work as a writer and producer on the FX television series The Americans.

== Early life ==
Stephen Schiff was born in Detroit around 1954, and he grew up in Littleton, Colorado. He graduated from Wesleyan University.

== Career ==
Schiff began his writing career at The Boston Phoenix, where he became the chief film critic and film editor (succeeding David Denby), and hired and trained such critics as Owen Gleiberman and David Edelstein.

In 1983, he was a finalist for the Pulitzer Prize in Criticism. Later that year, he was named Critic-at-Large of Vanity Fair, a post he held until 1992, when he became a staff writer at The New Yorker, specializing in cultural profiles, many of which appeared under his rubric, "Cultural Pursuits." His subjects included Steven Spielberg, V. S. Naipaul, Stephen Sondheim, Oliver Stone, Muriel Spark, and Edward Gorey.

From 1987 until 1996, Schiff was also the Film Critic of National Public Radio's Fresh Air. He served three terms as chairman of the National Society of Film Critics, and spent two seasons as a Correspondent on CBS-TV's prime-time newsmagazine West 57th, whose other Correspondents included Steve Kroft and Meredith Vieira.

In 1995, Schiff was asked to write a screenplay adaptation of Vladimir Nabokov's novel Lolita, by the prospective film's then-producer, Richard Zanuck. It was Schiff's first screenplay, and the controversial film that was made from it, directed by Adrian Lyne, was released in 1998. In her New York Times review, critic Caryn James called "Stephen Schiff's discerning, faithful screenplay [...] sensitive to Nabokov's wit as well as his lyricism."

Schiff became a full-time screenwriter, leaving The New Yorker in 2003. His subsequent films include The Deep End of the Ocean (1999), starring Michelle Pfeiffer; True Crime (1999), directed by and starring Clint Eastwood; Wall Street: Money Never Sleeps (2010), Oliver Stone's sequel to the 1987 film Wall Street; and American Assassin (2017).

In 2013, Schiff became a writer and Consulting Producer of the FX television series The Americans, starring Keri Russell and Matthew Rhys. He continued with the show for the rest of its six-season run, rising to the position of writer/Executive Producer for its last two seasons.

Schiff's episode "The Magic of David Copperfield V: The Statue of Liberty Disappears" (Season 4, Episode 8) was named the best episode of the entire series by New York magazine.

For his work on The Americans, Schiff won a Golden Globe, the Peabody Award, two Writers Guild of America Awards, the Critics Choice Award the Television Critics Association Award, the American Film Institute Award (for "Contribution to America's Cultural Legacy"), and the Producers Guild Award. He also received two Prime Time Emmy Award nominations and two additional Writers Guild of America Award nominations.

During Schiff's tenure with the show, The Americans was nominated for 72 major awards, winning 23 of them.

From 2011 to 2016, he was also the writer and Executive Producer of the extreme sports documentary series Ultimate Rush.

Schiff served four terms on the governing Council of the Writers Guild of America East. He also served as the Writers Guild's National Chairman and twice headed the East's negotiating committee. In 2002, he was given the Guild's Richard B. Jablow Award.

Since 2005, he has served as chairman of the Board of the Society for the Study of Myth and Tradition, which publishes Parabola magazine. He is a member of the Academy of Motion Picture Arts and Sciences (AMPAS), the Academy of Television Arts & Sciences, the Writers Guild of America, the Producers Guild of America, and PEN America.

He contributed the critical essay on Nabokov's Lolita to Harvard University Press's landmark scholarly compendium A New Literary History of America, which was published in September, 2009.

In December 2009, Henry Holt and Company announced that it would publish Schiff's forthcoming biography of Norman Mailer.

In November 2018, Schiff was hired by Lucasfilm to serve as showrunner for Andor. He stepped down from the position in February 2020, and in April 2020 Tony Gilroy replaced him as showrunner. Schiff remained involved with the series, writing the seventh episode ("Announcement") of the first season.

Schiff was an Executive Producer and writer on the Showtime TV series Super Pumped. The show debuted in February 2022.

Personal Life

Stephen Schiff is married to self-help author and advisor Laura Day.

== Filmography ==
- Lolita (1997)
- The Deep End of the Ocean (1999)
- True Crime (1999)
- Wall Street: Money Never Sleeps (2010)
- Ultimate Rush (2011–2017) (episodes)
- The Americans: "A Little Night Music" (2014)
- The Americans: "Yousaf" (with Stuart Zicherman) (2014)
- The Americans: "Salang Pass" (2015)
- The Americans: "Experimental Prototype City of Tomorrow" (2016)
- The Americans: "The Magic of David Copperfield V: The Statue of Liberty Disappears" (2016)
- The Americans: "Crossbreed" (2017)
- The Americans: "Darkroom" (2017)
- American Assassin (2017)
- Super Pumped: The Battle for Uber: "War" (2022)
- Andor: "Announcement" (2022)

== Bibliography ==
- Bruccoli, Matthew Joseph; Baughman, Judith; le Carre, John (2004), Conversations With John Le Carre (Literary Conversations Series), Mississippi: University Press of Mississippi, pp. 93–106, ISBN 1-57806-669-7
- Gorey, Edward; Wilkin, Karen (2001), Ascending Peculiarity: Edward Gorey on Edward Gorey: Interviews, San Diego, California: Harcourt, pp. 136–157, ISBN 0-15-100504-4
- Huffhines, Kathy Schulz (1991), Foreign affairs: the National Society of Film Critics' video guide to foreign films, San Francisco: Mercury House, ISBN 1-56279-016-1
- Jameson, Richard T. (1994), They went thataway: redefining film genres: a National Society of Film Critics video guide, San Francisco: Mercury House, ISBN 1-56279-055-2
- Jussawalla, Feroza F. (1997), Conversations with V. S. Naipaul, Mississippi: University Press of Mississippi, pp. 135–153, ISBN 0-87805-946-6
- Keough, Peter; Society of Film Critics, National (1995), Flesh and blood: the National Society of Film Critics on sex, violence, and censorship, San Francisco: Mercury House, ISBN 1-56279-076-5
- Lupack, Barbara Tepa (1998), Critical essays on Jerzy Kosinski, New York: G.K. Hall, pp. 221–235, ISBN 0-7838-0073-8
- Rainer, Peter (1992), Love and hisses: the National Society of Film Critics sound off on the hottest movie controversies, San Francisco: Mercury House, ISBN 1-56279-031-5
- Schiff, Stephen (1998), Lolita: The Book of the Film, Milwaukee: Applause Books, p. 226, ISBN 1-55783-354-0
- Schiff, Stephen (April 30, 2000), "Summer Films: Screen play -- Edith Wharton Gets the Treatment (3 Ways); Meeting Cute on a Far Planet: The Bibliodromist Knows Best", The New York Times
- Spielberg, Steven; Notbohm, Brent; Friedman, Lester D. (2000), Steven Spielberg: interviews, Mississippi: University Press of Mississippi, pp. 170–192, ISBN 1-57806-113-X
- Sragow, Michael (1990), Produced and abandoned: the best films you've never seen, San Francisco: Mercury House, ISBN 0-916515-84-2
- Stoppard, Tom; Delaney, Paul (1994), Tom Stoppard in conversation, Michigan: University of Michigan Press, pp. 212–224, ISBN 0-472-06561-0
- Thiroux, Emily (1997), Cultures: diversity in reading and writing, Upper Saddle River, NJ: Prentice Hall, ISBN 0-13-400128-1pp. 96–105
