= The Feminine Touch (1995 film) =

The Feminine Touch (1995)
- Directed by: Conrad Janis
- Written by: Maria Grimm
- Produced by: Dan Beder; Tim Cooney; Maria Grimm; Woodrow B. Hood; John Michaels
- Starring: Paige Turco; Dirk Benedict; George Segal; Elliott Gould; Conrad Janis; Bo Hopkins
- Cinematography: Monty Rowan
- Edited by: John Orland
- Music by: Tony Humecke
- Distributed by: Orion Pictures
- Release date: 1995
- Running time: 94 minutes
- Country: United States
- Languages: English; French; Spanish

The Feminine Touch (also called The November Conspiracy) is a 1995 American direct-to-video thriller film directed by Conrad Janis. It stars Paige Turco as Jennifer Barron, a woman who is targeted after her boyfriend is assassinated and left secret documents in her possession.

== Plot ==
Jenny Baron (Paige Turco) is an investigative reporter who is swept into a deadly conspiracy that reaches the highest levels of the government. When she is assigned the task of getting the story of the charismatic Presidential candidate Senator Ashton (George Segal), her job is complicated by a string of political assassinations and attempted assassinations. After her lover (Dirk Benedict) is killed, things get personal for Jenny. She finds herself in possession of a computer disk that holds a list of powerful politicians marked for elimination, and the key to the massive web of death and deceit. What's more, she discovers that she is next on the list of targets! Pursued by hitmen and hunted by police, she may discover a truth she's not prepared to accept - but only if she survives!

== Cast ==
- Paige Turco as Jennifer Barron
- Dirk Benedict as John Mackie
- George Segal as Senator 'Beau' Ashton
- Elliott Gould as Senator George M. Kahn
- Conrad Janis as Frank Donaldsonn
- Bo Hopkins as Captain Hogan
- Lois Nettleton as Pigeon
- Maria Grimm as Maria de la Luz Schultz

== Release ==
The film has only been released in VHS format as of February 4, 2012.
