= Blue Collar Boys (film) =

- Directed by: Mark Nistico
- Written by: Mark Nistico
- Produced by: Mark Nistico
- Starring: Gabe Fazio; Bruce Kirkpatrick; Ed Setrakian; Lev Gorn; Kevin Interdonato; Russ Russo; Joshua Paled; Shane Patrick
- Cinematography: Ian Dudley
- Edited by: Mark Nistico
- Music by: Mark Nistico
- Production company: Silent Sea Productions
- Distributed by: Vyre Network
- Release dates: 7 September 2012 (Syracuse); 14 November 2013 (US)
- Running time: 93 minutes
- Country: United States
- Language: English

Blue Collar Boys is a 2012 American drama film directed by Mark Nistico, starring Gabe Fazio, Bruce Kirkpatrick, Ed Setrakian, Lev Gorn, Kevin Interdonato, Russ Russo, Joshua Paled and Shane Patrick.

== Cast ==
- Gabe Fazio as Charlie Redkin
- Bruce Kirkpatrick as Senior
- Ed Setrakian as Gene
- Lev Gorn as Ira
- Kevin Interdonato as Nazo
- Russ Russo as Slim
- Joshua Paled as Mason
- Shane Patrick as Irish
- Sonja Stuart as Patty
- Julie Bersani as Samantha
- Tiffany Ellen Solano as Marisol
- Kirk Ponton as Thaddeus
- Mark Konrad as Councilman George
- Sal Rendino as Detective Reilly
- Melanie Minichino as Mrs. Steiner

== Release ==
The film premiered at the Palace Theatre in Syracuse, New York.

== Reception ==
Rob Marvin of The Daily Orange gave the film a score of 4/5 and wrote that it "captures the devastating ripple effects of economic hardship with unflinching realism, a bold script and several intensely emotional performances from its young lead actors."

Phil Hall of Film Threat wrote that while the "surplus of foul language" and the "heavily saturated" cinematography "tend to distract from the genuine emotional grit", the film "scores as an honest and often disturbing portrait of contemporary working class life, and it certainly deserves to be seen."

Kristina Bravo of LA Weekly wrote that Nistico "has created a story with convincing naturalism, giving it universal appeal."

Gary Goldstein of the Los Angeles Times wrote that Nistico's "clichéd, sledgehammer dialogue alone is enough to shut this one down."
