= Margo Martindale =

American character actress (born 1951)

- Martindale in 2026
- Born: July 18, 1951 (age 75); Jacksonville, Texas, U.S.
- Education: Lon Morris College; University of Michigan (BA)
- Occupation: Actress
- Years active: 1987–present
- Spouse: Bill Boals (m. 1986)
- Children: 1
- Relatives: Billy Martindale (brother)

Margo Martindale (born July 18, 1951) is an American character actress who has appeared on television, film, and stage. In 2011, she won a Primetime Emmy Award and a Critics' Choice Television Award for her recurring role as Mags Bennett on Justified. She was nominated for an Emmy Award four times for her recurring role as Claudia on The Americans, winning it in 2015 and 2016.

Martindale is known for her extensive supporting roles in numerous films such as The Rocketeer (1991), Lorenzo's Oil (1992), The Firm (1993), Dead Man Walking (1995), Ghosts of Mississippi (1996), Marvin's Room (1996), The Hours (2002), Million Dollar Baby (2004), Walk Hard (2007), The Savages (2007), Hannah Montana: The Movie (2009), Secretariat (2010), Win Win (2011), August: Osage County (2013), Instant Family (2018), Uncle Frank (2020), and Cocaine Bear (2023).

She has had numerous recurring roles in shows such as The Good Wife (2015–2016), Impeachment: American Crime Story (2021), and Mrs. Davis (2023). For her portrayal of Bella Abzug on the FX miniseries Mrs. America (2020) she received a Primetime Emmy Award for Outstanding Supporting Actress in a Limited Series or Movie nomination. She also voiced a fictionalized version of herself in the Netflix series BoJack Horseman. She made her Broadway debut in the 2004 revival of Cat on a Hot Tin Roof for which she received a nomination for the Tony Award for Best Featured Actress in a Play.

== Early life and education ==
Martindale was born in Jacksonville, Texas, the youngest of three children and only daughter of William Everett and Margaret (née Pruitt) Martindale.

Her oldest brother is the professional golfer and golf course designer Billy Martindale. The middle child, brother Bobby Tim, born 1946, died in 2004 at the age of 58. Margo participated in golf, cheerleading and drama at school, and was crowned Football Sweetheart and Miss Jacksonville High School 1969.

Following graduation in 1969, she attended Lon Morris College, then transferred to the University of Michigan at Ann Arbor. While at Michigan, she attended summer courses at Harvard University, appearing onstage with future movie and TV stars Jonathan Frakes and Christopher Reeve.

== Career ==
=== 1980–2010 ===
In the early 1980s, Martindale worked for four years at the Actors Theatre, Louisville, Kentucky, where she became good friends with fellow actress Kathy Bates. One of her first television roles came in the miniseries Lonesome Dove (1989). Martindale starred in several off-Broadway stage productions, most notably originating the role of Truvy Jones in the first production of Steel Magnolias, and starring in its first national tour. Martindale has been described as a character actress. Martindale's film roles include acting alongside Susan Sarandon in both Lorenzo's Oil (1992), and Dead Man Walking (1995). She appeared as Leonardo DiCaprio's character's doctor in Marvin's Room (1997); and as Hilary Swank's character's selfish mother in Million Dollar Baby (2004). Other films include The Human Stain (2003) with Anthony Hopkins and Nicole Kidman, Nobody's Fool (1994) with Paul Newman, 28 Days (2000) with Sandra Bullock, Proof of Life with Russell Crowe and Meg Ryan, and Practical Magic (1998), again with Nicole Kidman and Sandra Bullock.

Martindale made her Broadway debut in 2004 as Big Mama in Cat on a Hot Tin Roof, for which she received a Tony Award nomination for Best Featured Actress in a Play. A series of character and guest appearances followed in a wide range of TV shows. Martindale played recurring character Camilla Figg on the first three seasons of Dexter and had a recurring role in the A&E courtroom drama 100 Centre Street with Alan Arkin. From 2007 to 2008, she had a recurring role as Nina Burns, a neighbor of the Malloy/"Rich" family in The Riches with Minnie Driver and Eddie Izzard.

=== 2011–present ===
In 2011, Martindale joined the cast of Justified for the second season. She played the role of Mags Bennett, matriarch of the Bennett crime family which controlled much of the drug activity in the fictional version of Harlan County, Kentucky. She won the Primetime Emmy Award for Outstanding Supporting Actress in a Drama Series for her performance.

After learning of the nomination, Martindale told CNN she hoped that it would open up more doors for older women in Hollywood. "People really identify with this character [Mags Bennett] and I think it's because it is a character that is powerful and older and extremely mean", she said. She won Best Supporting Actress in a Drama Series at the Critics' Choice Television Awards for her role as Mags Bennett. In February 2012 it was announced Martindale had been cast in the ABC comedy pilot Counter Culture, which was not picked up.

Martindale had a role in August: Osage County (2013), a film adaptation of the Pulitzer Prize-winning play by Tracy Letts. She played Mattie Fae Aiken, the sister of lead character Violet Weston (Meryl Streep). Filming took place in the fall and winter of 2012. Martindale returned to television in late January 2013 in the spy drama The Americans on FX Network. She played Claudia, the KGB "handler" of two Soviet spies living in 1980s Cold War America.

She co-starred in the sitcom The Millers on CBS. In 2015, she began a recurring role as Ruth Eastman, Peter Florrick's new campaign manager on The Good Wife. Martindale took up the role of Ruth again in 2018 in season two of The Good Fight, the sequel to The Good Wife. She appears as a fictionalized version of herself on the Netflix animated comedy BoJack Horseman. Her fictional version is easily angered and temperamentally violent, moonlighting as a bank robber and going on frequent criminal heists. BoJack consistently refers to her as "Esteemed Character Actress Margo Martindale", while most other characters begin addressing her with "Beloved."

Martindale played Audrey Bernhardt, matriarch of the family on the Amazon series Sneaky Pete starring Giovanni Ribisi, for the 2015 pilot, the first season which aired in January 2017, and the second and third seasons as well. She also played Mike's Aunt Rosemary in two episodes of Mike & Molly. I Spy, a podcast hosted by Martindale and produced by Foreign Policy, was released in November 2019.

She portrayed Ruth Eastman in The Good Fight (2018–2021) and Senator Elizabeth Guthrie in Your Honor (2020–2021). For her performance as US Congresswoman Bella Abzug on the FX miniseries Mrs. America (2020) for which she received a nomination for the Primetime Emmy Award for Outstanding Supporting Actress in a Limited Series or Movie.

== Personal life ==
Martindale has been married to musician Bill Boals since 1986.

== Acting credits ==
=== Film ===
Key
†	Denotes films that have not yet been released

Year	Title	Role	Notes	Ref.
1990	Days of Thunder	Donna		
1991	The Rocketeer	Millie		
1992	Lorenzo's Oil	Wendy Gimble		
1993	Emma and Elvis	Jenny		
1993	The Firm	Nina Huff		
1994	Nobody's Fool	"Birdy"		
1995	Dead Man Walking	Sister Collegeville		
1995	Sabrina	Nurse		
1996	Marvin's Room	Dr. Charlotte Samit		
1996	Ghosts of Mississippi	Clara Mayfield		
1997	Critical Care	Constance "Connie" Potter		
1997	Eye of God	Dorothy		
1998	Twilight	Gloria "Mucho" Lamar		
1998	Practical Magic	Linda Bennett		
1999	In Dreams	Nurse Floyd		
1999	Ride with the Devil	Wilma Brown		
2000	28 Days	Betty		
2000	Proof of Life	Ivy		
2002	The Hours	Mrs. Latch		
2003	It's All About Love	Betsy		
2003	The Human Stain	Psychologist		
2003	An Unexpected Love	Maggie		
2004	The Best Thief in the World	Miss Mason		
2004	Million Dollar Baby	Earline Fitzgerald		
2006	Out There	Jeri		
2006	Wedding Daze	Betsy		
2006	Paris, je t'aime	Carol		
2007	The Savages	Roz		
2007	Rocket Science	Coach Lumbly		
2007	Mo	Pam		
2007	The Death and Life of Bobby Z	Macy		
2007	Rails & Ties	Judy Neasy		
2007	Feast of Love	Mrs. Maggarolian		
2007	Walk Hard: The Dewey Cox Story	Ma Cox		
2008	Management	Trish Flux		
2009	The Winning Season	Donna		
2009	Hannah Montana: The Movie	Grandma Ruby		
2009	Orphan	Dr. Browning		
2009	La soga	Flannigan		
2010	Forged	Dianne		
2010	Secretariat	Elizabeth Hamm		
2010	Main Street	Myrtle Parker		
2011	Win Win	Eleanor Cohen		
2011	Scalene	Janice Trimble		
2013	Beautiful Creatures	Aunt Del		
2013	Bluebird	Crystal		
2013	August: Osage County	Mattie Fae Aiken		
2014	Heaven is for Real	Nancy Rawling		
2016	Sophie and the Rising Sun	Anne Morrison		
2016	The Hollars	Sally Hollar		
2016	The Boss	Sister Agnes Aluminata		
2016	Mother's Day	Florence "Flo"		
2016	My Entire High School Sinking Into the Sea	Mrs. Brinson (voice)		
2017	Wilson	Alta		
2017	Table 19	Freda Eckberg		
2017	Cars 3	Louise "Barnstormer" Nash (voice)		
2017	Downsizing	Woman On Shuttle	Cameo	
2018	Instant Family	Sandy Wagner		
2019	Blow the Man Down	Enid Nora Devlin		
2019	The Kitchen	Helen O'Carroll		
2020	Uncle Frank	Mammaw Bledsoe		
2020	Lazy Susan	Mary O'Connell		
2022	Family Squares	Diane Worth	Also C & D Camera Operator	
2023	Cocaine Bear	Ranger Liz		
2025	The Twits	Mrs. Twit (voice)		
2026	The Long Haul	CJ		
TBA	Just Picture It †	TBA	Post-production	

=== Television ===
Year	Title	Role	Notes
1988	The Child Saver	Alma	TV film
1989	Lonesome Dove	"Buffalo" Heiffer	Episode: "The Plains"
1994	New York Undercover	Nurse Warner	Episode: "Tasha"
1996	Law & Order	Ms. Best	Episode: "Atonement"
1996	Ruby Jean and Joe	Frankie	TV film
1997	...First Do No Harm	Marjean	TV film
1999	Homicide: Life on the Street	Verna Henderson	Episode: "The Same Coin"
1999	Earthly Possessions	Libby	TV film
1999	Snoops	Hannah Larson	Episode: "Pilot"
2000	Perfect Murder, Perfect Town	Linda Hoffmann-Pugh	TV film
2001	Welcome to New York	Rose	Episode: "Dusting Diva"
2001	A Girl Thing	May	TV film
2001	What Girls Learn	Lainey	TV film
2001–2002	100 Centre Street	Michelle Grande	14 episodes
2002	The Laramie Project	Trish Steger	TV film
2003	Ed	Amanda Myers	Episode: "Partners"
2003	An Unexpected Love	Maggie	TV film
2004	Iron Jawed Angels	Harriot Blatch	TV film
2004	Plainsong	Mrs. Beckman	TV film
2005	Silver Bells	Mrs. Quinn	TV film
2006	Law & Order: Special Victims Unit	Rita Gabler	Episode: "Cage"
2006–2008	Dexter	Camilla Figg	5 episodes
2007–2008	The Riches	Nina Burns	Regular role (20 episodes)
2009	Hung	Molly	Episode: "The Pickle Jar"
2009–2010	Mercy	Nurse Klowden	Recurring role (11 episodes)
2011	Harry's Law	Gina Powell	Episode: "Innocent Man"
2011	Justified	Mags Bennett	Recurring role (10 episodes)
2011	Chaos	Doris Balshik	Episodes: "Pilot", "Proof of Life"
2011–2012	A Gifted Man	Rita Perkins-Hall	Main role (16 episodes)
2012	Counter Culture	Billie	TV film
2012	Suits	Nell Sawyer	Episode: "Meet the New Boss"
2012	Person of Interest	Barbara Russell	Episode: "Bad Code"
2013	Smash	Miriam Abramson	Episode: "The Fallout"
2013	New Girl	Bonnie Miller	Episode: "Chicago"
2013	Masters of Sex	Miss Horchow	Episode: "Pilot"
2013–2014	The Millers	Carol Miller	Main role (34 episodes)
2013–2018	The Americans	Claudia	Recurring role (32 episodes)
2014–2020	BoJack Horseman	Character Actress Margo Martindale	Voice; 8 episodes; fictionalized version of self
2015	Mike & Molly	Rosemary Ritter	Episodes: "Mudlick or Bust" and "Mother From Another Mudlick"
2015–2016	The Good Wife	Ruth Eastman	Recurring role (13 episodes)
2015–2019	Sneaky Pete	Audrey Bernhardt	Main role (30 episodes)
2016	BrainDead	Dr. Joanne Alaimo	Season 1: "Episode 5"
2017–2021	DuckTales	Ma Beagle (voice)	8 episodes
2017	The Guest Book	Alice	3 episodes
2018–2021	The Good Fight	Ruth Eastman	4 episodes
2019	The Act	Emma Lois Gisclair Pitre	Episode: "A Whole New World"
2020	Mrs. America	Bella Abzug	Main role; Miniseries
2020–2023	Your Honor	Senator Elizabeth Guthrie	9 episodes
2021	Infinity Train	Judge Morpho (voice)	Recurring; Book 4 – Duet
2021	Ada Twist, Scientist	Great Aunt Rose (voice)	Episode: "Movie Night/The Banana Peel Problem"
2021	Impeachment: American Crime Story	Lucianne Goldberg	5 episodes
2022	The Watcher	Maureen	6 episodes
2023	Accused	Joanna Lynn Pierce	Episode: "Laura's Story"
2023	Mrs. Davis	Mother Superior	3 episodes
2024	Big City Greens	Dr. Bloom (voice)	Episode: "Unguarded"
2024	The Chicken Sisters	Narrator	8 episodes
2024	Doctor Odyssey	Ellen Parsons	Episode: "I Always Cry At Weddings"
2024	The Sticky	Ruth Landry	6 episodes
2025	Poker Face	Dr. Hamm	Episode: "Sloppy Joseph"
2026	Dark Matter	Laurel	2 episodes
2026	All's Fair	Gloria Bloom	2 episodes

=== Theater ===
Year	Title	Role	Venue(s)	Refs.
1982	Talking With	Performer ("Rodeo")	Manhattan Theatre Club	
1984	The Miss Firecracker Contest	Tess Mahoney	Manhattan Theatre Club	
1987	Steel Magnolias	Truvy	WPA Theater, Lucille Lortel Theatre	
1990	Steel Magnolias	Truvy	Westport Country Playhouse	
1991	The Stick Wife	Betty Connor	Manhattan Theatre Club	
1995	The Sugar Bean Sisters	Faye Clementine	WPA Theater	
1997	Always … Patsy Cline	Louise	Variety Arts Theater	
2003	Cat on a Hot Tin Roof	Big Mama	Music Box Theatre, Broadway	

== Awards and nominations ==
Organizations	Year	Category	Work	Result	Refs.
Critics' Choice Television Awards	2011	Best Supporting Actress in a Drama Series	Justified	Won	
Critics' Choice Television Awards	2016	Best Guest Performer in a Drama Series	The Good Wife	Won	
Critics' Choice Television Awards	2018	Best Supporting Actress in a Drama Series	Sneaky Pete	Nominated	
Critics' Choice Television Awards	2021	Best Supporting Actress in a Movie/Miniseries	Mrs. America	Nominated	
Drama Desk Awards	2004	Outstanding Featured Actress in a Play	Cat on a Hot Tin Roof	Nominated	
Gracie Awards	2015	Outstanding Female Actor in a Featured or Guest Role	The Americans	Won	
Online Film & Television Association	2011	Best Supporting Actress in a Drama Series	Justified	Nominated	
Online Film & Television Association	2013	Best Guest Actress in a Drama Series	The Americans	Nominated	
Outer Critics Circle Awards	2004	Outstanding Featured Actress in a Play	Cat on a Hot Tin Roof	Nominated	
Primetime Emmy Awards	2011	Outstanding Supporting Actress in a Drama Series	Justified (episode: "Brother's Keeper")	Won	
Primetime Emmy Awards	2013	Outstanding Guest Actress in a Drama Series	The Americans (episode: "The Colonel")	Nominated	
Primetime Emmy Awards	2014	Outstanding Guest Actress in a Drama Series	The Americans (episode: "Behind the Red Door")	Nominated	
Primetime Emmy Awards	2015	Outstanding Guest Actress in a Drama Series	The Americans (episode: "I Am Abassin Zadran")	Won	
Primetime Emmy Awards	2016	Outstanding Guest Actress in a Drama Series	The Americans (episode: "The Magic of David Copperfield V")	Won	
Primetime Emmy Awards	2020	Outstanding Supporting Actress in a Limited Series or Movie	Mrs. America	Nominated	
Satellite Awards	2011	Best Supporting Actress – Television	Justified	Nominated	
Satellite Awards	2013	Best Supporting Actress – Television	The Americans	Nominated	
Screen Actors Guild Awards	2013	Outstanding Cast in a Motion Picture	August: Osage County	Nominated	
Screen Actors Guild Awards	2018	Outstanding Ensemble in a Drama Series	The Americans	Nominated	
TCA Awards	2011	Individual Achievement in Drama	Justified	Nominated	
Tony Awards	2004	Best Featured Actress in a Play	Cat on a Hot Tin Roof	Nominated	
