= Michael Aronov =

American actor & playwright (born 1976)

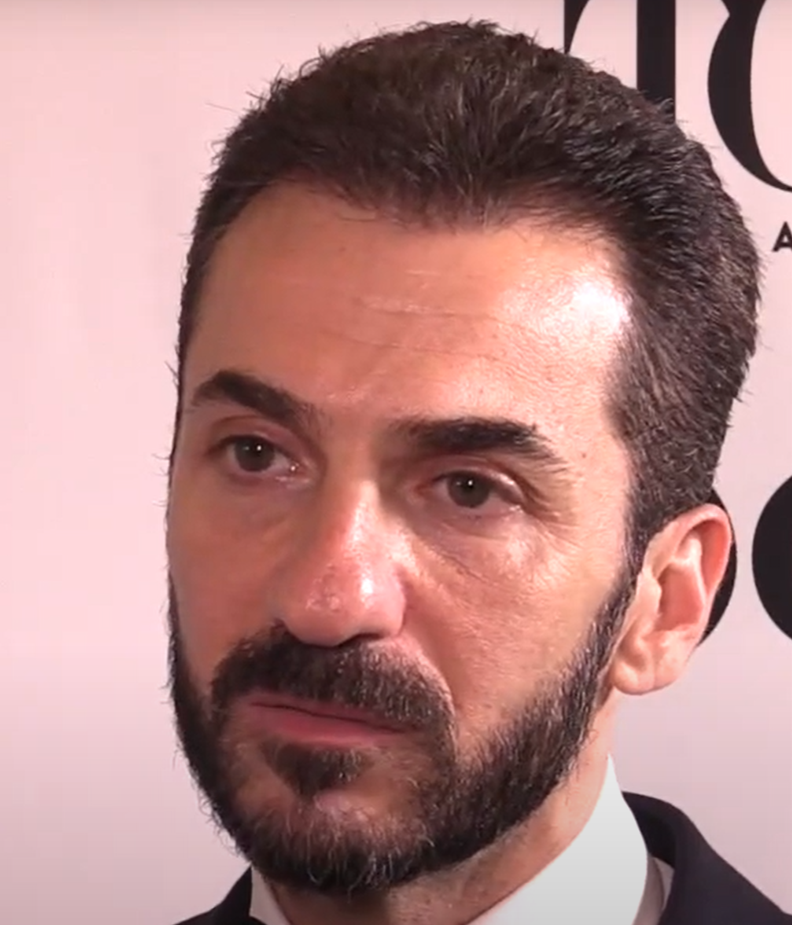
- Aronov at the 2017 Tony Awards
- Born: May 4, 1976 (age 50); Tashkent, Uzbek SSR, Soviet Union
- Education: Southern Methodist University (BFA)
- Occupations: Actor, playwright
- Notable work: Tony Award for Best Featured Actor in a Play

Michael Aronov (born May 4, 1976) is an American actor who has worked in film, television and theatre. In 2017, he won the Tony Award for Best Featured Actor in a Play for his role as Uri Savir in the Broadway play Oslo. He is also known for playing the role of Anton Baklanov, a refusenik scientist in The Americans.

== Early life ==
Aronov was born in Tashkent, Uzbek SSR (today in Uzbekistan). He grew up in Miami, Florida and graduated from the city's New World School of the Arts. In 1998 he graduated with a B.F.A in theatre at Meadows School of the Arts at Southern Methodist University. He is Bukharian Jewish.

== Career ==
Aronov spent three seasons on the award-winning series The Americans playing a physicist who is torn from his family and exiled as a political prisoner. In 2017 The Blacklist brought him on as a new member to the show's cast, playing Smokey Putnum, the lovable hustler and sidekick to James Spader. Aronov was also recurring as right-hand-man to John Malkovich in Showtime's Billions. Aronov played one of the leads in a series for Cinemax called Jett and was recently seen opposite Ben Kingsley and Oscar Isaac on the big screen in Operation Finale.

In film, Aronov is known for his role as Chovka, the Chechen warlord and head gangster opposite Tom Hardy and James Gandolfini in The Drop (2014). Other films include Lbs., Amexicano and Hedwig and the Angry Inch. The actor also played Danny Raden - a series lead opposite Larenz Tate in BET's original pilot, Gun Hill. Aronov's other television work includes Count Vincent of Naples in the series Reign, Danny Lambros on The Good Wife, Michael Cahill on Person of Interest, Ricky Vintano on Blue Bloods, billionaire Brice Hunter on Without a Trace and recurring roles on Madam Secretary and The Closer.

For his stage work Aronov received the Tony Award for Best Featured Actor in a Play in 2017 for his role as Uri Savir in the Broadway play Oslo. He was also honored with the Lucille Lortel Award, the Obie Award, and received Drama Desk Award and Outer Critics Circle Award nominations for Oslo. Prior to that the actor originated the role of Paul in Lyle Kessler's First Born at The Actors Studio in New York. He won "The Elliot Norton Award - Best Actor", for originating the lead role in Theresa Rebeck's Mauritius. On Broadway he appeared as Siggie, in the Tony-nominated revival of Golden Boy (2012-2013), directed by Bartlett Sher. He worked with Sher and Lincoln Center for the Performing Arts yet again, playing Gromov, in the American premiere of Blood and Gifts (2011). Aronov was also seen in his solo-show Manigma (2010, 2006), in New York City. In Europe he portrayed Stanley Kowalski in the classic A Streetcar Named Desire (2009). The actor also took on Jean in Miss Julie (2004) at the Cherry Lane Theatre, Dionysus in The Bacchae 2.1 (2001); and Edgar in an award-winning production of King Lear (1999).

== Filmography ==
=== Television ===
Year	Title	Role	Notes
2000	The Beat	Vendor	In 1 episode, "Cueca Solo"
2000	Spin City	First Protester	In 1 episode, "Airplane!"
2000	All My Children	Lazlo	In 1 episode
2000	Law & Order: Criminal Intent	Avi	In 1 episode, "One"
2000, 2002	Law & Order: Special Victims Unit	Gorsky; Igor	In 2 episodes, a different character in each
2003	Threat Matrix	Amir Abadiyah	In 1 episode, "Patriot Acts"
2006	The Game	Babak	In 1 episode, "Gifted"
2008	Without a Trace	Brice Hunter	In 1 episode, "22 x 42"
2008	Lipstick Jungle	Serge	In 1 episode, "Chapter 14: Let the Games Begin"
2009	Life on Mars	Yuri Demidov	In 1 episode, "Take a Look at the Lawmen"
2000, 2007, 2009	Law & Order	Alex Arshavin; Karl Rostov; Andre Korsakoff	In 3 episodes, a different character in each
2010	White Collar	Clark Maskhadov	In 1 episode, "In the Red"
2010	Blue Bloods	Ricky Vintano	In 1 episode, "Officer Down"
2010	The Closer	Armand Marku	In 2 episodes
2011	Burn Notice	Vlade / Serb	In 1 episode, "Enemy of My Enemy"
2011	The Good Wife	Danny Lambros	In 1 episode, "The Death Zone"
2011	Gun Hill	Danny Raden	TV movie
2012	Person of Interest	Michael Cahill	In 1 episode, "Blue Code"
2012	Americana	Alexander Orloff	TV movie
2013	Golden Boy	Dominic Quinlan	In 1 episode, "Vicious Cycle"
2013	Elementary	Andrej Bacera	In 1 episode, "Heroine"
2013	Reign	Count Vincent	In 1 episode, "Left Behind"
2015	Forever	Dasha	In 1 episode, "The King of Columbus Circle"
2015	The Mystery of Matter: Search for the Elements	Dmitri Mendeleev	TV mini series documentary
2015	Quantico	Hamza Kouri	In 1 episode, "Go"
2014-2016	The Americans	Anton Baklanov	In 12 episodes
2014, 2016	Madam Secretary	Anton Durchenko	In 2 episodes
2016	They Shall Not Perish: The Story of Near East Relief	Leslie A. Davis	TV documentary
2018	Billions	Michael	In 3 episodes
2017-2019	The Blacklist	Joe 'Smokey' Putnum	In 6 episodes
2019	Jett	Jack 'Jackie' Dillon	In 9 episodes
2021	Hit & Run	Isaac	In 5 episodes
2022	The First Lady	Rahm Emanuel	
2024	Snowpiercer	Dr. Nima Rousseau	Main, season 4
2026	The Terror: Devil in Silver	'Huey'	Main, season 3: Devil in Silver

=== Film ===
Year	Title	Role	Notes
2000	Hedwig and the Angry Inch	Schlatko (band member)	
2004	LBs.	Sacco Valenzia	
2007	Amexicano	Alex	
2008	Soldier's Heart	The documentary director	
2009	Cold Souls	Mafioso	
2010	Anomaly: Oblivion	Simon (voice)	Short film
2012	Happy Hour	Christo	Short film
2013	Fortune House	Peter	Short film
2014	The Drop	Chovka	
2018	Half Magic	John	
2018	Operation Finale	Zvi Aharoni	
2021	Crisis	Minas	
2026	The Betrayers		

=== Stage ===
Year	Title	Role	Notes
2001	The Late Henry Moss	Attendant 1	Signature Theatre Company, Off-Broadway
2004	Miss Julie	Jean	Cherry Lane Theatre, Off-Broadway
2006	Mauritius	Dennis	Huntington Theatre Company
2007	Spain	El Conquistador	Lucille Lortel Theatre, Off-Broadway
2008	Unusual Acts of Devotion	Leo Belraggio	Philadelphia Theatre Company
2010	Manigma	Chacha/Sasha/Rick/Others	Harold Clurman Theater, Off-Broadway
2011	Blood and Gifts	Dmitri Gromov	Lincoln Center Theater, Off-Broadway
2012	Golden Boy	Siggie	Belasco Theatre, Broadway
2016	Oslo	Uri Savir	Lincoln Center Theater, Off-Broadway
2017	Oslo	Uri Savir	Vivian Beaumont Theater, Broadway
2017	Oslo	Uri Savir	Vivian Beaumont Theater, Broadway
2027	Awake and Sing!	Jacob Berger	Samuel J. Friedman Theatre, Broadway

== Awards and nominations ==
Year	Award	Category	Work	Result
2017	Tony Award	Best Featured Actor in a Play	Oslo	Won
2017	Drama Desk Award	Outstanding Featured Actor in a Play	Oslo	Nominated
2017	Outer Critics Circle Award	Outstanding Featured Actor in a Play	Oslo	Nominated
2017	Lucille Lortel Award	Outstanding Featured Actor in a Play	Oslo	Won
2017	Obie Award	Ensemble	Oslo	Won
