= Costa Ronin =

Australian actor, born in the Soviet Union

- Костя Ронин
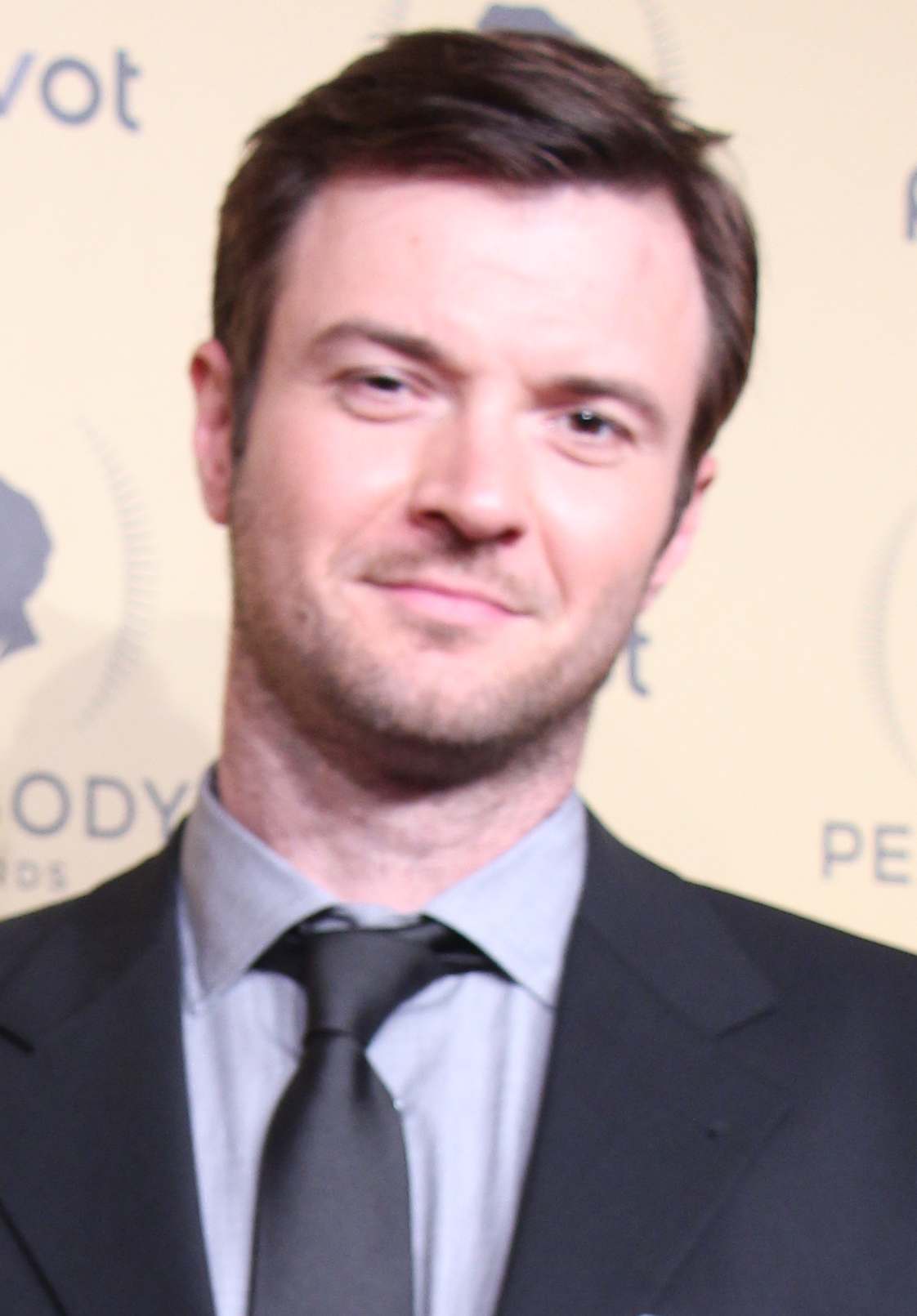
- Ronin at the Peabody Awards 2015
- Born: Konstantin Ronin; 3 February 1979 (age 47); Kaliningrad, RSFSR, USSR
- Citizenship: Russia; Australia
- Occupation: Actor
- Years active: 2009–present
- Spouse: Leah Lowder (m. 2021)
- Children: 1

Konstantin "Costa" Ronin (Russian: Константин "Коста" Ронин; born 3 February 1979) is a Russian-born Australian actor and cinematographer, best known for appearances in Red Dog, as Gregorovich on the SBS drama East West 101, as Oleg Igorevich Burov in the FX drama The Americans and as Yevgeny Gromov on Homeland.

== Early life and education ==
Ronin was born in Kaliningrad, Russian SFSR, Soviet Union (now Russia). He spent the first 17 years of his life in Russia. In his youth, he moved to Wellington, New Zealand with his mother and studied international relations and political science at Victoria University, before moving to Perth, Australia for further tertiary education and, later, to Sydney.

At age 15, Ronin commenced working and learned about American culture at a radio station that taught English through music.

== Personal life ==
Growing up in Kaliningrad, Ronin was taught to sail by his father and grandfather at age five and remains passionate about it.

He married Leah Lowder in June 2021. They live in New York, having previously lived in Los Angeles, Surry Hills and Sydney. He recently welcomed his first daughter with wife Leah in April 2026.

== Filmography ==
Year	Title	Role	Notes	References
2011	Red Dog	Dzambaski	Feature film	
2014–2018	The Americans	Oleg Igorevich Burov	TV series (Recurring Season 2; Main Seasons 3-6)	
2014	Extant	Anton	TV series (Episode: "Shelter")	
2015	Agent Carter	Anton Vanko	TV series (Episode: "Now is Not the End")	
2015	Agent X	Misha Voronsky	TV series (Episode: "Fidelity")	
2016	Gotham	Luka Volk	TV series (Episodes: "Mad City: The Executioner ," "Mad City: Time Bomb")	
2016	The Strain	Alexei Boiko	TV series (Episode: "Collaborators")	
2017	Shooter	Russian ambassador	TV series (Episode: "Primer Contact")	
2018–2020	Homeland	Yevgeny Gromov	TV series (Season 7: Recurring; Season 8: Main)	
2018	Splitting Up Together	Vlad	TV series (Episode: "We Need to Talk About Karen")	
2019	Once Upon a Time in Hollywood	Wojciech Frykowski		
2022	The Endgame	Sergey Vodianov	Series regular	
2023	Obliterated	Ivan Koslov	TV Series (5 episodes)	
2023	ISS	Nicholai	Feature film	
2025	The Morning Show	Dimitri Ivanov	TV series (Episode: "Un Bel Di")	
2026	For All Mankind	Leonid Polivanov	TV series (Season 5)	
2026	The Terminal List	Vasili Andrenov	TV series (Season 2)	
