= Lev Gorn =

Russian-American actor and photographer (b. 1971)

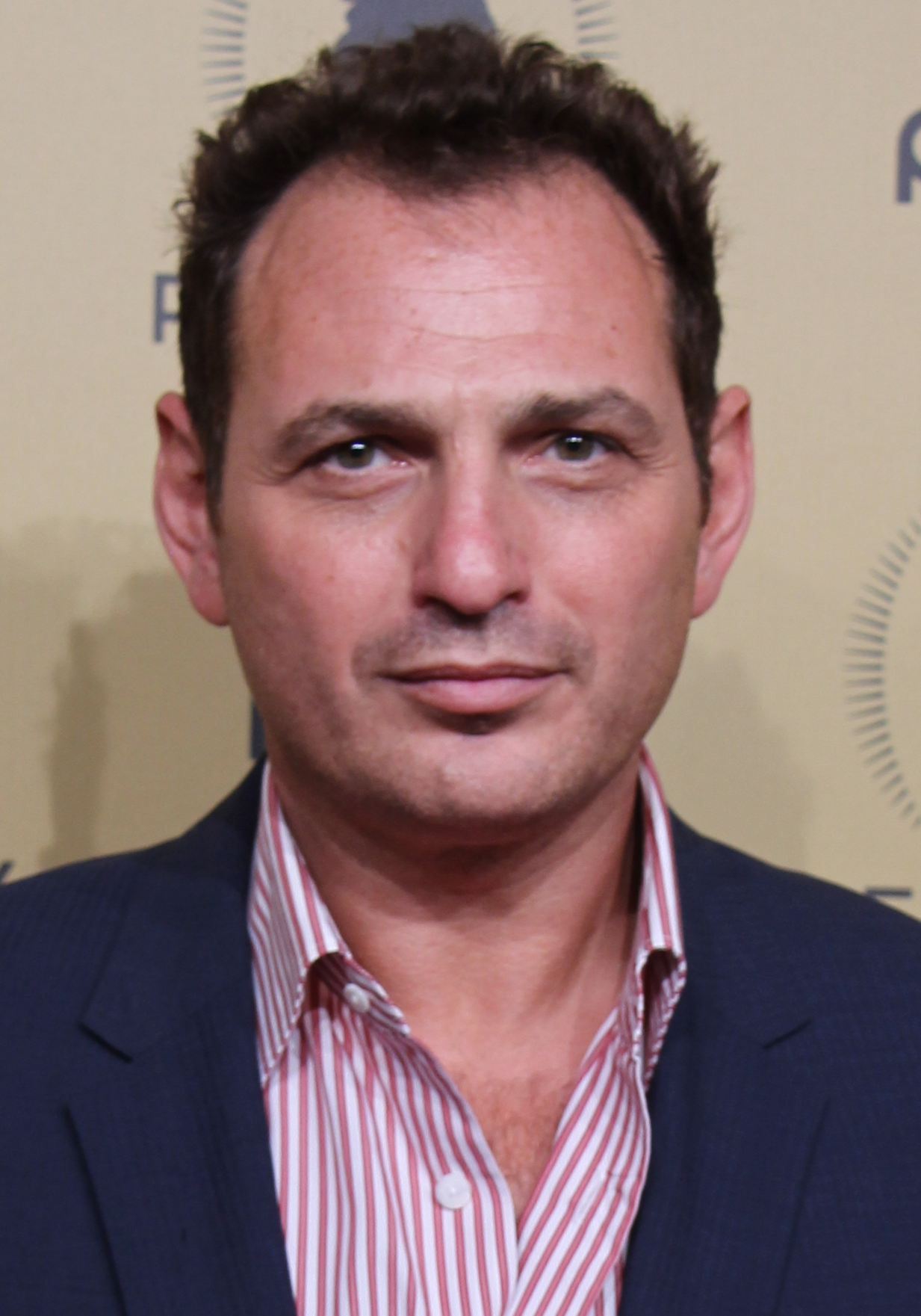
- Gorn at the May 2015 Peabody Award
- Born: 1971 (age 54–55); Stavropol, Stavropol Krai, Russian SFSR (now Russia)
- Other name: Lev Gorens
- Citizenship: United States
- Occupations: Actor, photographer
- Years active: 1999–present
- Website: www.gornphoto.com

Lev Gorn (Russian: Лев Горн; born 1971) is a Russian-American actor, photographer, and filmmaker. He is best known for his roles as KGB rezident officer Arkady Ivanovich Zotov on The Americans (2013–18), Mikhail Vassily Tal on The Enemy Within (2019), and Grigory Kuznetsov on For All Mankind (2022–23).

== Life and career ==
Gorn was born in Stavropol, Russian SFSR in 1971, to Russian Jewish parents. His family emigrated from the USSR in 1981, settling in New York City. Gorn attended a yeshiva in Brooklyn and the High School of Art and Design in Manhattan. He studied at the International Center of Photography. He became a naturalized United States citizen in his adulthood.

Gorn is best known for his principal role as Arkady Ivanovich Zotov, the KGB rezident officer, on the Cold War spy drama television series The Americans (2013–18).

In addition to his acting career, Gorn is a professional headshot and portrait photographer, with a studio at W 34th St. in Manhattan. He resides in the Flatiron District.

== Filmography ==
=== Feature films ===
Year	Title	Role	Notes
2000	Crimson Nights	Burt	as 'Lev Gorens'
2003	Sucker Punch	Ivan	
2004	Keane	Drug Dealer	
2005	Unbridled	Alexi	
2005	Straight Forward	Ward Cardova	
2006	Vettaiyaadu Vilaiyaadu	Det. Anderson	
2007	Padre Nuestro	Rough-Shave	
2008	Manhattanites	Blake Whitney	
2010	Bronx Paradise	Manny	
2013	Once Upon a Time in Queens	Dominic Salerno Jr.	
2013	Blue Collar Boys	Ira	
2014	Pawn Sacrifice	Russian Newscaster	
2014	Vkus Ameriki	Berman	
2016	Ace the Case	Surgeon	
2016	Café Society	Eddie	
2018	This Teacher	John	
2019	Lingua Franca	Murray	
2021	Payback	Alexander Pushka	
2021	The Expat	Nick	
2022	Love and Communication	Silverman	
2024	Nobody Wants to Shoot a Woman	John	
TBA	Love Love †		Filming

=== Short films ===
Year	Title	Role	Notes
2005	New Liberty	Roy	
2008	Joe Mover	Nicky	Also writer and director
2008	Saint Nick	Ivan	
2008	Ten: Thirty One	Dell	Also writer and director
2009	Knife Point	Gerry	
2009	Exile	Adam	
2014	The Vigilante	John Hardin	
2016	With Yuri	Boris	

=== Television ===
Year	Title	Role	Notes
2003	The Wire	Eton Ben-Eleazer	Recurring cast; Season 2
2003	Law & Order: Special Victims Unit	N.J. Swat McKenzie	Episode: "Escape"
2004	All My Children	Miles	Episode: "Episode #1.8831"
2004	Law & Order: Criminal Intent	Mr. Gregorian	Episode: "Semi-Detached"
2005	Third Watch	Kirt Lang	Episode: "The Kitchen Sink"
2005	Law & Order: Trial by Jury	Mr. Dushinsky	Episode: "The Abominable Showman"
2006	As the World Turns	Anatoly	Regular Cast
2006	Law & Order: Criminal Intent	Anton	Episode: "Wasichu"
2006	Brotherhood	Pravsha Pishenkov	Recurring Cast: Season 1
2007–08	Street Fighter: The Later Years	Ken Masters	Recurring Cast
2009	Guiding Light	Mr. Kovac	Episode: "Episode #1.15624"
2009	Bored to Death	Dimitri	Episode: "The Case of the Lonely White Dove"
2010	Trenches	Cpi. Traina	Main Cast
2013–18	The Americans	Arkady Zotov	Recurring Cast: Season 1-2 & 6, Main Cast: Season 3-4
2014–16	NCIS	Russian Counselor Anton Pavlenko	Recurring Cast: Season 12, Guest: Season 13
2015	Mike Tyson Mysteries	Bartender (voice)	Episode: "Kidnapped"
2015	Madam Secretary	Ukrainian President Mikhail Bozek	Recurring Cast: Season 2
2017	Taken	Yuri Surnuyev	Episode: "Hail Mary"
2017	Blue Bloods	Det. Arkedy Levin	Episode: "Foreign Interference"
2018	Instinct	Uri Marshak	Episode: "Owned"
2018	Billions	Max	Episode: "Icebreaker"
2018	Maniac	Sokolov	Recurring Cast
2018	How to Do Everything	Nate	Episode: "How To Level Up"
2019	The Enemy Within	Mikhail Vassily Tal	Recurring Cast
2019	Jack Ryan	Mikhail Pelevin	Episode: "Cargo"
2021	New Amsterdam	Ben Osheyevsky	Episode: "Fight Time"
2022	Bull	Danilo Kovalev	Episode: "The Other Shoe"
2022–23	For All Mankind	Grigory Kuznetsov	Recurring Cast: Season 3-4
2023	Citadel	Gregor Yovanovich	Episode: "The Human Enigma"
2023–24	Power Book III: Raising Kanan	Det. Arthur Ogden	Recurring Cast: Season 3

=== Video games ===
Year	Title	Role
2008	Grand Theft Auto IV	Ivan Bytchkov (voice)
2023	Call of Duty: Modern Warfare III	Ivan "Ares" Alexxeve (voice)

== Stage credits ==
=== Off-Broadway ===
- The Good Steno, as Sm / Mr. Burton / Father
- My Antonia, as Ambrosh
- The Penis Monologue, as Man #1
- Napoli, Brooklyn, as Nic Muscolino

=== Others ===
- Cloud 9, as Bagley / Martin (United Kingdom)
- The Crucible, as Francis Nurse (New York City)
- Fuente Ovejuna, as King Ferdinand (UK)
- Man Equals Man, as Polly (NYC)
- A Man For All Seasons, as Henry VIII (UK)
- Savages, as Carlos (UK)
- Taming of the Shrew, as Grumio (Michigan)
- What Sprang Off A Gypsie, as Jesco (NYC)
