= Columbia University School of the Arts =

Fine arts graduate school of Columbia University

Coordinates: 40.80896°N 73.96309°W

- Type: Private
- Established: 1965; 61 years ago
- Dean: Sarah Cole
- Students: ~835 students
- Location: New York, NY, U.S.
- Campus: Urban
- Website: arts.columbia.edu

The Columbia University School of the Arts is the graduate school for fine arts at Columbia University, located in Morningside Heights, New York, United States.

The school offers Master of Fine Arts (MFA) degrees in Film, Visual Arts, Theatre and Writing, as well as the Master of Arts (MA) degree in Film Studies. It also works closely with the Arts Initiative at Columbia University (CUArts) and organizes the Columbia University Film Festival (CUFF), a week-long program of screenings, screenplay, and teleplay readings.

Founded in 1965, the school is one of the leading institutions for the study of visual, performing, and literary arts in the United States. Among the school's distinguished graduates are sculptors David Altmejd, Hugh Hayden and Banks Violette, visual artist Lisi Raskin, painters Marc Handelman and Dana Schutz, poets Mary Jo Bang, Tracy K. Smith and Emily Fragos, screenwriter Jennifer Lee and James Mangold, screenwriter and actress Gülse Birsel, and directors Kathryn Bigelow and James Gunn.

== History ==

The history of the School of the Arts can be traced back to the first courses in drawing offered at Columbia in 1881. In 1900, drama critic Brander Matthews was appointed professor of Dramatic Literature, first chair of drama at any university in the country. Courses in creative writing, film, and painting followed. In 1921, the Department of Fine Arts was established for the study of architecture, painting, sculpture and scholarly works in those fields. The university's first sculpture classes were offered in 1936, followed two years later by graphic art classes. In 1947, the School of Painting and Sculpture, and the School of Dramatic Arts were established.

In December 1965, the Trustees of Columbia established the School of the Arts to train both graduate and undergraduate students. In 1970, the school began offering only graduate courses. A year later, it moved into Dodge Hall at Broadway and 116th Street and Prentis Hall on 125th Street, where the school’s classrooms, rehearsal spaces and administrative offices are located. In 1988, the Miller Theatre, constructed in 1924, was established as Columbia's performing arts producer following renovations to the previous space known as the McMillin Academic Theatre. In 2017, construction was completed on Renzo Piano's 60,000-square-foot Lenfest Center for the Arts, a multidisciplinary academic and performance space on Columbia's Manhattanville campus. The Lenfest also houses the Miriam and Ira D. Wallach Art Gallery.

In 2021, the School of Arts was the subject of a Wall Street Journal investigative report into prestigious universities that run programs that have lopsided costs for students relative to their expected earnings in the field. According to the Journal, "Columbia has more high-debt master's degree programs in low-paying fields than any other Ivy League university." The article further stated alumni carry a median debt of US$181,000, "the highest debt compared with earnings among graduates of any major university master’s program in the U.S."

== Programs ==
=== Film ===
The School of the Arts' Film Program is well-regarded in the field and offers Master of Fine Arts (MFA) degrees with concentrations in Screenwriting/Directing, Writing for Film & Television and Creative Producing. The program also offers a Master of Arts (M.A.) in Film Studies.

In 2016, the MFA film program accepted 72 students out of approximately 600 applicants. The Hollywood Reporter ranked it number four in the top 25 American film schools of 2020.

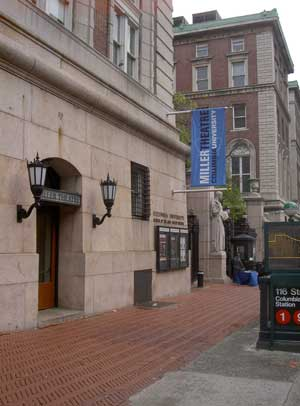
Entrance to the Miller Theatre on the Columbia University Morningside Heights campus.

=== Theater ===
The School of Arts's Theatre Program offers Master of Fine Arts (M.F.A.) degrees in theater with concentrations in acting, directing, playwriting, dramaturgy, stage management, and theater management and producing. The playwriting concentration has been heralded by two-time Pulitzer Prize-winner Lynn Nottage and Tony Award winner David Henry Hwang.

In 2018, applications to the acting concentration doubled with the appointment of former Yale School of Drama acting professor Ron Van Lieu. The acting concentration has emerged as one of the highest ranking graduate acting programs in the world and is helmed by casting director James Calleri.

The Theatre Program also offers a Ph.D. and joint J.D./M.F.A. degree in association with Columbia Law School.

=== Visual Arts ===
In the Visual Arts Program at the School of Arts, students work in the fields of painting, photography, printmaking, sculpture, digital media, drawing, performance, and video art.

=== Writing ===
The School of Arts's writing program offers degrees in creative writing, with concentrations in fiction, non-fiction, and poetry. One of its more notable features are "master classes", four-week courses for writers (as opposed to critical scholars) "designed to stimulate provocative discussions about literary craft and artistic choices." Master class faculty have included Helen Vendler, Jonathan Lethem, Colson Whitehead, James Wood, Richard Ford, Han Ong, Susan Choi and Jonathan Ames. The writing division also employs prestigious writers as seminar and workshop instructors; in recent years these have included Zadie Smith, Gary Shteyngart, Nathan Englander, Myla Goldberg, Adam Haslett, Jessica Hagedorn, Phillip Lopate, Marie Howe, Eamon Grennan, Paul LaFarge, David Gates, Francisco Goldman, Darcy Frey and David Ebershoff.

== Deans of Columbia School of the Arts ==
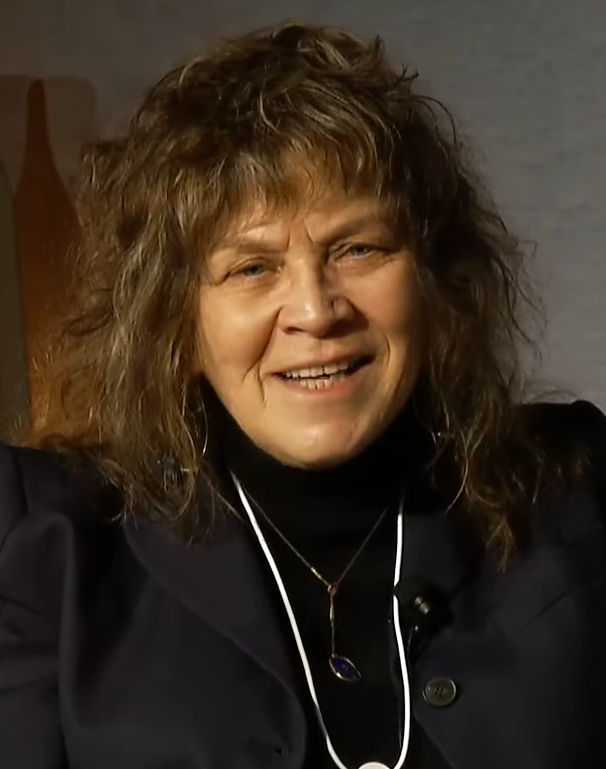
Carol Becker Dean from 2007–2023

- Davidson Taylor (1966–1971)
- Frank MacShane (interim dean, 1971–1972)
- Bernard Beckerman (1972–1976)
- Schuyler G. Chapin (1976–1987)
- Peter Smith (1987–1995)
- Robert Fitzpatrick (1995–1998)
- Dan Kleinman (acting, 1998–1999)
- Bruce W. Ferguson (1999–2005)
- Dan Kleinman (acting, 2005–2007)
- Carol Becker (2007–2023)
- Sarah Cole (2023–present)

== Notable alumni and attendees ==
=== Film ===
- Ayad Akhtar - screenwriter and actor, The War Within; Pulitzer Prize-winning playwright, Disgraced
- Alice Arlen - screenwriter of Silkwood, The Weight of Water, Then She Found Me
- Bogdan Apetri (2006) - screenwriter, film director, Miracle, Unidentified
- Sophie Barthes - screenwriter, film director, Cold Souls, Madame Bovary
- Albert Berger - Producer Little Children, Little Miss Sunshine, Cold Mountain
- Shari Springer Berman and Robert Pulcini - Academy Award nominated screenwriter-directors, American Splendor, The Nanny Diaries
- Kathryn Bigelow (1979) - screenwriter, film director, producer and two-time Academy Award winner for The Hurt Locker (2009).
- Anna Boden - co-screenwriter and director, Half Nelson, Captain Marvel
- Richard Brick (1971) - producer Hangin' with the Homeboys, Caught; Co-Producer Deconstructing Harry, Celebrity, Sweet and Lowdown, Arizona Dream
- Liz Chae - screenwriter, film director, documentary director, The Last Mermaids (documentary)
- Lisa Cholodenko (1998) - screenwriter and film director, The Kids Are All Right, Laurel Canyon, The L Word
- Deborah Chow (2003) - screenwriter, television and film director, The High Cost of Living; director, The Mandalorian
- Richard Corliss - Time magazine film critic
- Cherien Dabis (2004) - filmmaker, screenwriter - The L Word, Amreeka
- Adam Davidson (1994) - television and film director, actor
- Sabrina Dhawan - screenwriter, Monsoon Wedding
- Peter Farrelly (1986) - director and screenwriter
- Scott Ferguson (1990) - executive producer, Succession
- Michael France - screenwriter, GoldenEye, Cliffhanger
- James Franco (2010) - filmmaker, actor, screenwriter, producer
- Anne Goursaud - director Poison Ivy II: Lily, editor One From the Heart, The Outsiders, Ironweed, Idlewild
- Will Graham (2006) - screenwriter, producer Daisy Jones & the Six, Mozart in the Jungle, A League of Their Own
- Anna Gutto (2016) - writer-director, Paradise Highway
- Nicole Holofcener - film and television director, screenwriter Please Give, Enough Said, Friends with Money, Sex and the City, Gilmore Girls, Six Feet Under
- Courtney Hunt - Academy Award nominated screenwriter and film director, Frozen River, The Whole Truth
- Annemarie Jacir (2002) - film director, screenwriter, Salt of this Sea, When I Saw You, Wajib
- Phil Johnston - screenwriter, Wreck-It Ralph, Zootopia; co-director, Ralph Breaks the Internet
- Khary Jones - Award-winning screenwriter and film director, Hug
- Simon Kinberg - screenwriter, producer, Mr. & Mrs. Smith, X-Men: First Class, X-Men: Days of Future Past
- Yves Lavandier (1983–85) - screenwriter, director and script doctor
- Jennifer Lee (2005) - Academy Award-winning screenwriter and director, Frozen, Wreck-It Ralph
- Ashley Lyle - co-creator, Yellowjackets
- John Magary - film director, screenwriter The Mend (film)
- S. J. Main Muñoz (2004) - screenwriter and film director, Requiescat ; director, American Horror Stories, Manifest, The Cleaning Lady
- James Mangold - film director, screenwriter 3:10 to Yuma, Girl, Interrupted, Walk the Line, Cop Land
- Nathalie Álvarez Mesén (2019) - Guldbagge Award-winning director, Clara Sola
- Marc Moss (1983–1985) - screenwriter Kiss the Girls, Along Came a Spider, Alex Cross, Homefront
- Greg Mottola (1991) - film director, screenwriter Adventureland, Superbad, Paul
- Mauro Mueller (2008) - film director, producer, screenwriter Copenhagen, A World for Raúl, Dear Chickens
- Ron Nyswaner (1981) - screenwriter, The Painted Veil, Philadelphia; showrunner, Fellow Travelers
- David Pastor (2004) - screenwriter, film director, Carriers, The Occupant, Bird Box Barcelona
- Kimberly Peirce (1996) - director, Boys Don't Cry, Stop-Loss
- James Ponsoldt - writer and director of The End of the Tour, The Spectacular Now and Smashed
- Mark Raso (2008) - screenwriter, film director, Copenhagen, Kodachrome, Awake
- Patricia Riggen (2003) - screenwriter, film director, The 33, Girl in Progress, Miracles from Heaven
- Jay Russell (1985) - screenwriter, director, producer My Dog Skip, Ladder 49, Tuck Everlasting
- Saim Sadiq (1999) - director, Joyland
- Beth Schacter (2004) - screenwriter, film director, showrunner, Normal Adolescent Behavior, Super Pumped
- Florin Serban (2008) - screenwriter, film director, If I Want to Whistle I Whistle (winner of the Jury Grand Prix & Alfred Bauer Prize at the Berlin Film Festival)
- Jeffrey Sharp - producer, You Can Count on Me, Boys Don't Cry, Proof
- Patrick Stettner (1995) - screenwriter, film director, The Business of Strangers
- Malia Scotch Marmo - screenwriter, Once Around, Hook, Madeline
- Joan Stein (1999) - screenwriter, film director, One Day Crossing (winner of the Student Academy Award)
- Nader Talebzadeh - film director
- Chris Teague (2006) - cinematographer, Only Murders in the Building
- Eric Tuchman (1987) - executive producer, The Handmaid's Tale
- Sergio Umansky (2004) - screenwriter, film director, Eight Out of Ten, It's Better if Gabriela Doesn't Die
- Jonathan Van Tulleken (2010) - director, executive producer, Shōgun, Blade Runner 2099
- Tanya Wexler - film director, Jolt, Hysteria, Finding North
- Armond White - film critic
- Aaron Woolfolk (1998) - film director, screenwriter The Harimaya Bridge
- Lauren Wolkstein (2009) - film director, screenwriter, The Strange Ones, Dead Ringers
- Suzi Yoonessi - American filmmaker, screenwriter, film director, Dear Lemon Lima, Daphne & Velma
- Alex Zamm (1989) - film director, Beverly Hills Chihuahua 2, Inspector Gadget 2
- Sameh Zoabi (2005) - screenwriter, film director, Man without a Cell Phone

=== Theatre ===
- Saheem Ali (2007) - theater director, The Public Theater
- Rachel Chavkin (2008) - theatre director, 2019 Tony Award Winner for Best Direction of a Musical
- Bathsheba Doran (2003) - playwright
- Albert Hall (1971) - actor
- Kathryn Hamilton - British theatre director
- Claire Labine - head writer of Ryan's Hope, One Life to Live, General Hospital, Where the Heart Is, Guiding Light
- Nick Mangano - stage actor and director
- Anson Mount (1998) - actor
- Diane Paulus (1997) - theater director
- James Rebhorn (1972) - actor
- Jay Scheib (1997) - theatre director
- Kathryn Shaw - director, actor, writer
- Celine Song (2014) - director, screenwriter, Past Lives
- Marcel Spears (2015) - actor on The Neighborhood on CBS
- Darko Tresnjak (1998) - director and winner of a Tony Award, Obie Award, Drama Desk Award, and Outer Critics Circle Award
- Beau Willimon (2003) - playwright, screenwriter, producer, creator, showrunner and executive producer of House of Cards

=== Writing ===
- Jonathan Ames (1989) - writer
- Jesse Ball (2004) - writer
- Mary Jo Bang (1998) - poet
- Claire Beames (2006) - novelist and short story writer
- Mei-mei Berssenbrugge (1974) - poet
- John Bowe (1994) - journalist focussing on modern slavery
- Tina Chang (1998) - poet, named Poet Laureate of Brooklyn
- Emma Cline (2013) - writer and novelist
- Richard Corliss (1974) - film critic
- Adam Cushman (2005) - writer, author of Cut
- Kiran Desai (1999) - winner of the Booker Prize and the National Book Critics Circle Award for her novel The Inheritance of Loss
- Meghan Daum (1996) - writer and journalist
- Timothy Donnelly - poet
- Stephen J. Dubner (1990) - writer, Freakonomics
- Naomi Falk (2017) - writer, editor at Archway Editions
- Peter Farrelly (1986) - director, Green Book; novelist, Outside Providence
- Amanda Filipacchi - novelist
- Emily Fragos (1996) - poet, nominated for the National Book Critics Circle Award
- James Franco (2010) - actor
- Matt Gallagher (2013) - writer
- Rivka Galchen (2006) - fiction writer, author of Atmospheric Disturbances
- Philip Gourevitch (1992) - writer and journalist
- James Gunn (1995) - director, Guardians of the Galaxy film series
- Tama Janowitz (1986) - writer
- Maureen Johnson (2003) - novelist
- Heidi Julavits - writer
- Dave King (1999) - novelist
- Peter Knobler - writer, editor
- E. J. Koh - poet, author, and translator
- Benjamin Kunkel - author of Indecision
- Rachel Kushner (2000) - novelist
- Jean Kwok - novelist
- Clive Matson (1989) - poet, author of nine collections of poetry including Squish Boots and Chalcedony's Ten Songs
- Dinaw Mengestu (2005) - fiction writer, novelist, author of The Beautiful Things That Heaven Bears
- Susan Minot (1983) - novelist and screenwriter
- Chris Molnar (2019) - writer and co-founder of Archway Editions
- Rick Moody (1986) - novelist
- Ed Park - novelist and founding editor of The Believer
- Sigrid Nunez - fiction writer, novelist, author of The Last of Her Kind, Salvation City and Sempre Susan: A Memoir of Susan Sontag
- Gregory Orr - poet, author of over 10 collections of poetry including River Inside the River
- Katha Pollitt (1975) - feminist writer
- Richard Price (1976) - novelist and screenwriter
- Anna Rabinowitz (1990) - poet, librettist
- Claudia Rankine (1993) - poet
- Beth Raymer (2007) - author of Lay the Favorite: A Memoir of Gambling (turned into the film Lay the Favorite) and Sweetheart Deals
- Mark Rudman (1974) - poet
- Karen Russell (2006) - fiction writer, author of Swamplandia!
- Vijay Seshadri (1988) - poet, essayist, and literary critic
- Tracy K. Smith (1997) - poet, won the Pulitzer Prize for her book of poetry Life On Mars
- Scott Smith - author and screenwriter
- Matthew Stadler (1987) - novelist and essayist, author of Allan Stein
- Wells Tower (2000) - fiction and non-fiction writer, author of Everything Ravaged, Everything Burned
- Vendela Vida - novelist and founding editor of The Believer
- Frank Benjamin Wilderson III - writer, dramatist, filmmaker, and critic
- Amy Wilensky - writer of memoirs
- Adam Wilson (2009) - novelist and fiction writer, author of Flatscreen

=== Visual Arts ===
- Derrick Adams (2003) - visual and performance artist
- David Altmejd (2001) - artist of sculptural systems
- Einat Amir (2009) - video and performance artist
- Korakrit Arunanondchai (2012) - video and multimedia artist
- Pablo Barba (2016) - painter
- Esteban Cabeza de Baca (2014) - painter
- Susan Chen (2020) - painter
- Ian Cheng (2009) - digital artist
- Caitlin Cherry (2012) - painter
- Nancy Cohen (1984) - sculptor, papermaker, and installation artist
- Pamela Council (2014) - multidisciplinary artist and educator
- Cy Gavin (2016) - painter
- Chitra Ganesh (2002) - visual artist
- Ann Gillen (1969) - sculptor
- Samara Golden (2009) - installation artist
- Marc Handelman (2003) - painter
- Ilana Harris-Babou (2016) - sculptor and installation artist
- Hugh Hayden (2018) - sculptor
- Louise E. Jefferson - artist, graphic designer
- Liz Magic Laser (2008) - visual and performing artist.
- Leigh Ledare (2008) - photography
- Yasue Maetake - sculptor
- Nadja Verena Marcin - multimedia artist
- Ruth Patir (2015) - digital artist
- Sondra Perry (2015) - interdisciplinary; video, computer-based media, and performance
- Lisi Raskin (2003) - visual artist
- Edda Renouf (1971), artist and printmaker
- Rachel Rose (2013) - video artist
- Mika Rottenberg - video artist
- Aki Sasamoto (2007) - installation and performance artist
- Dana Schutz (2002) - painter
- Rachel Stern (2016) - photographer
- Emily Mae Smith (2006) - painter
- Banks Violette (2000) - sculptor
- Jane Zweibel (1984) - painter and art therapist

=== Music ===
- Laurie Anderson (1972) - musician
- Kenneth Ascher, DMA (1966 CC; 1968 GSAS; 1971 SOA) – jazz pianist, composer
- Tan Dun (1993) - composer
- Robin Pecknold - frontman of the band Fleet Foxes

== Notable faculty ==
- Leslie Ayvazian - playwright and actor
- Gregory Amenoff - painter
- Ramin Bahrani - film director
- Tina Benko - actor
- Andy Bienen - screenwriter Boys Don't Cry
- Anthony Bregman - producer Eternal Sunshine of the Spotless Mind, Friends with Money
- Sanford Biggers - artist
- Anne Bogart - theater director
- Deborah Brevoort - playwright, librettist and lyricist
- Richard Brick - Co-Producer Sweet and Lowdown, Celebrity, Deconstructing Harry; Producer Hangin' with the Homeboys, "Caught"
- Hilary Brougher - film director
- Matthew Buckingham - artist
- Chou Wen-chung - composer
- Barbara De Fina - producer Goodfellas, You Can Count on Me, Kundun, The Grifters
- Ira Deutchman - producer Kiss Me, Guido, All I Wanna Do, Way Past Cool
- Rineke Dijkstra - artist
- Katherine Dieckmann - film director, screenwriter
- Mark Dion - artist
- Trey Ellis - screenwriter, filmmaker, novelist
- Manoel Felciano - Tony Award-nominated actor
- Miloš Forman - film director
- Liam Gillick - artist
- Bette Gordon - film director
- Michael Hausman - producer Brokeback Mountain, Gangs of New York, The Firm, All the King's Men
- Richard Howard - Pulitzer Prize winning poet
- David Henry Hwang - Tony Award winning playwright, librettist and screenwriter
- Annette Insdorf - film historian
- Jamal Joseph - screenwriter, film director
- Tom Kalin - screenwriter, film director, and producer
- Jon Kessler - artist
- David Klass - screenwriter, novelist
- Binnie Kirshenbaum - author
- Kristin Linklater - renowned vocal instructor
- Mynette Louie - producer
- Ben Marcus - fiction writer
- Charles L. Mee - playwright
- Eric Mendelsohn - screenwriter, film director
- Gregory Mosher - Tony Award-winning theatrical producer
- Mira Nair - director of Monsoon Wedding, Mississippi Masala, and Vanity Fair
- Lynn Nottage - two-time winner of the Pulitzer Prize for drama
- Richard Peña - film historian and programmer
- Adrienne Rich - poet
- Matthew Ritchie - artist
- Thomas Roma - artist
- James Schamus- producer The Ice Storm, Brokeback Mountain, Hulk
- Dana Schutz - artist
- Andrei Şerban - theater director
- Shelly Silver - artist
- Peter Sollett- director, screenwriter Raising Victor Vargas, Nick and Norah's Infinite Playlist
- Anocha Suwichakornpong - film director
- Sarah Sze - artist
- Rirkrit Tiravanija - artist
- Tomas Vu - artist
- Kara Walker - artist
- Harris Yulin - actor

== See also ==
- Columbia University
