= Handelman =

Handelman is a surname. Notable people with the surname include:

- Marc Handelman (born 1975), American painter
- Michelle Handelman (born 1960), American artist
- Stanley Myron Handelman (1929–2007), American comedian and actor
