= Carol Becker =

American writer and academic administrator

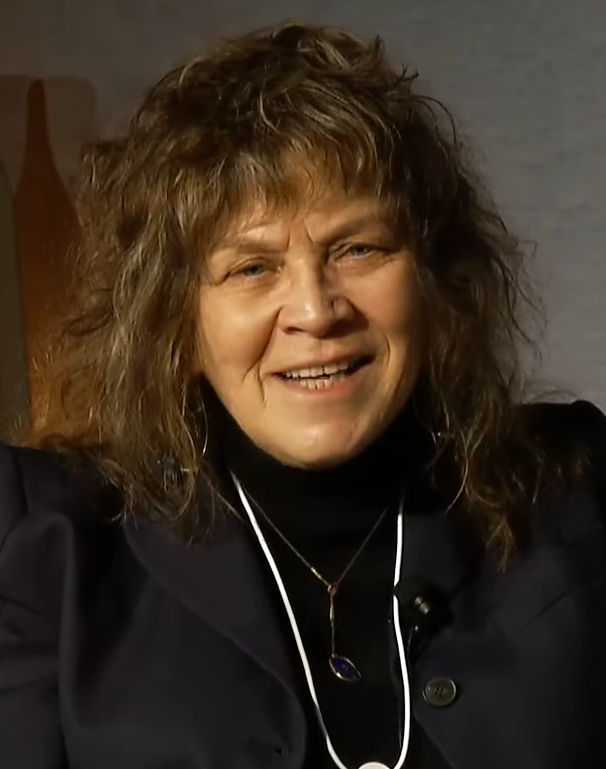
- Becker in 2020
- Occupations: Writer, academic administrator

Academic background
- Education: University of California, San Diego

Carol Becker is an American writer and academic administrator. She is a professor of the arts and has served as the dean of the Columbia University School of the Arts since 2007.

== Life ==
Becker earned a Ph.D. in English and American literature from the University of California, San Diego.

She is a professor of the arts at Columbia University. In 2007, she became dean of Columbia University School of the Arts. She lectures on art, artists and their place in society, and feminist theory. In 2023, she steps down as dean is set to be succeeded by interim dean Sarah Cole. Becker will continue to work as a professor of the arts.

== Selected works ==
- Becker, Carol (1987). The Invisible Drama: Women and the Anxiety of Change. Macmillan. ISBN 978-0-02-508200-7.
- Becker, Carol, ed. (1994). The Subversive Imagination: Artists, Society, and Responsibility. Psychology Press. ISBN 978-0-415-90592-3.
- Becker, Carol (1996). Zones of Contention: Essays on Art, Institutions, Gender, and Anxiety. SUNY Press. ISBN 978-0-7914-2937-2.
- Becker, Carol (2002). Surpassing the Spectacle: Global Transformations and the Changing Politics of Art. Rowman & Littlefield. ISBN 978-0-7425-0919-1.
- Becker, Carol (2009). Thinking in Place: Art, Action, and Cultural Production. Paradigm Publishers. ISBN 978-1-59451-596-5.
- Becker, Carol (2016). Losing Helen: An Essay. Red Hen Press. ISBN 978-1-59709-509-9.
