= Pamela Council =

American artist (born 1986)

- Born: January 17, 1986 (age 40); Southampton, New York, U.S.
- Education: Williams College, Columbia University
- Website: www.pamelacouncil.com

Pamela Council (born 1986) is an American multidisciplinary artist and educator. They work to produce sculpture, textiles, print-based media and performance art. Their work addresses Black American culture, and often features humor.

== Early life and education ==
Pamela Council was born in 1986 in Southampton, New York; into a Black family. She completed her secondary education at Stuyvesant High School, from 2000 to 2003.

Council attended Williams College, from 2003 to 2007, where she received a Bachelor of Arts degree and majored in Studio Art and minored in Mathematics. She attended Columbia University School of the Arts, from 2012 to 2014, where she received a Master of Fine Arts, and graduated with honors. She was a teaching assistant for the majority of her time at Columbia, teaching both graduate and undergraduate classes in sculpture and 3D building.

== Art work ==
Council works primarily in sculpture, textiles, print-based media and performance art. Her work has been commissioned and exhibited through the Schomburg Center for Research in Black Culture, the Studio Museum in Harlem, Williams College Museum of Art, Southampton Historical Museum and Kianga Ellis Projects among others. She completed a residency at MANA BSMT in 2016, and recently participated in the collective, Black Women Artists for Black Lives Matter.

Council's art reflects the complex relationships of cultural and individual identities by immersing the viewer in a "sensory experience". She draws on inspiration from Americana, physical beauty, and consumerism, juxtaposing her own materials with mass-produced objects.

== Notable exhibits ==
=== Flo-Jo World Record Nails (2012) ===
Flo-Jo World Record Nails (2012) incorporates replica of 2000 acrylic fingernails (as well as nail polish, rhinestones) in the shape of a 200m running track (at 1:100 scale), inspired by the nails Florence Griffith Joyner wore during the 1988 Summer Olympics when she set the 200m world record. Council explores themes of feminism, beauty, and consumerism in this piece, identifying the contradictory ties Black women have to physical beauty and the spending large sums of money on beauty products while earning less money in the United States.

=== A Fountain for Survivors (2021) ===
A Fountain for Survivors (2021) is an 18-foot-tall fountain inside of a dome and is covered with more than 350,000 acrylic finger nails. This work was on display in Times Square in New York City in 2021 as a tribute to the survivors of the COVID-19 pandemic in the United States.
