= Kathryn Hamilton =

British director

Kathryn Hamilton is a British theatre director who is now based in New York City. In addition to independent work, she is the Artistic Director of Sister Sylvester. For Sister Sylvester, she has directed The Ventriloquist Circle at Dixon Place; Look Back In, an adaptation of John Osborne's classic Look Back in Anger; a New York City tour of The Box Man; a site specific production of Play America at Saint Cecilia's Convent. She and the company are currently developing Hideouts for Time, or The Whale. Washington DC's Shakespeare Theatre Company recently invited her to present at their AsidesLive Symposium on Site Specific and Immersive Theatre.

The Ventriloquist Circle, which was developed at Kenny Scharf's Cosmic Cavern, was a Voice Choice in January 2012 and Backstage.com described it as "a surrealist detective story in order to explore notions of power, renegade sexuality, and love.". Play America, written by frequent collaborator Matt Wilson, was nominated for the 2011 IT award for Outstanding Original Full-Length Script.

Kathryn read for English Literature at The University of Cambridge and was awarded an MFA from Columbia University School of the Arts, for which she directed Jean Genet's The Screens.
