= Shelly Silver =

American artist (born 1957)

- Born: 1957 (age 68–69); Brooklyn, New York
- Education: Cornell University
- Occupations: Artist, professor
- Website: http://shellysilver.com

Shelly Silver (born 1957 in Brooklyn, NY) is an American artist who works with film, video, and photography. Her art has been exhibited and broadcast throughout the U.S., Europe and Asia. She is Associate Professor of Visual Arts at Columbia University School of the Arts.

== Biography ==
Silver attended Cornell University, graduating in 1980 with a B.A. in Intellectual History, and a B.F.A. in Mixed Media and subsequently attended the Whitney Museum of American Art Independent Studio Program. She has worked as a commercial video editor. In the 1990s, she lived in Germany, France, and Japan.

Silver has taught video art at the German Film and Television Academy, the New York University Tisch School of the Arts, The Cooper Union for the Advancement of Science and Art, and presently at Columbia University. She has received awards and fellowships from the Guggenheim Foundation, the NEA, NYSCA, NYFA, the DAAD, the Jerome Foundation, the Japan Foundation and Anonymous was a Woman. She currently lives in New York City.

== Art ==
Silver uses a mixture of fiction, documentary, and experimental genres to investigate questions of cultural identity. She experiments with perspective, exploring the power dynamics that exist between filmmakers and their subjects. Her role as a traveler and an outsider inspired the works she made abroad, such as Former East/Former West (1994) and 37 Stories About Leaving Home (1996). Her recent work centers on New York’s Chinatown.

=== Meet the People (1986) ===
The film consists of testimonials from fourteen individuals representing average New Yorkers talking about their daily lives. The film mimics the documentary genre, but at the end of the film, the credits reveal that all fourteen subjects are actors reading from a script written by Silver.

=== Former East/Former West (1994) ===
Consisting of hundreds of street interviews done in Berlin two years after the Reunification, this documentary is a portrait of citizen attitudes about what it means to be German at that particular moment in history.

=== 37 Stories About Leaving Home (1996) ===
Silver blends interviews with Japanese women describing their lives with a folktale of a young woman who is stolen by an Oni who is later saved by her mother.

=== small lies, Big Truth (1999) ===
In this work Silver pairs audio of narrators (four couples) reading the testimonials of Monica Lewinsky and President Bill Clinton as published in the Starr Report with found footage of zoo animals.

=== suicide (2003) ===
This feature-length fictional film follows a filmmaker through malls, airports, and train stations in Central America, Asia, and Europe as she searches for a reason to live. The role of the filmmaker is played by Silver herself.

=== What I'm Looking For (2004) ===
A series of photographs representing the results of a request posted to an online dating service: “I'm looking for people who would like to be photographed in public revealing something of themselves...”

=== in complete world (2008) ===
“Deceptively simple in its formal rigor, the film focuses on timbres of voices and shapes of faces, investing without reservation in the extended, non-sound-bite take in which all the strangeness, pathos, tang and perspicacity of demonic speech unfolds. Spliced between the interviews, black screens backed by city sounds both link and separate the speakers; the city is a matrix, but all will be drowned out if we don't listen carefully.” -Haim Steinbach

=== TOUCH (2013) ===
Silver constructs the fictional story of a gay man who has returned to New York after fifty years to care for his dying mother. The narration of the film is an essay told from the man’s point of a view, an amalgam of research and interviews.

=== The Lamps (2015) ===
The Lamps (2015) by Shelly Silver explores the rebellious spirit of Baroness Elsa von Freytag-Loringhoven, a provocative artist linked to the Dada movement and potentially the true creator of Fountain. The film recounts her audacious visit to Naples’ Archaeological Museum, where she breaks into a secret room of erotic Pompeian artifacts, highlighting her subversive engagement with art and history.

=== Frog Spider Hand Horse House (2013-2017) ===
Details of human bodies and animals in a peri-urban environment - dancing and motionless, alive and dead. Like her ambivalent plans, as beautiful as they are sharp, the visual poem composed by Shelly Silver shows the fragility of beings in the very expression of their vitality, the pulse and the possibility of its cessation. (Charlotte Garson)

=== Girls/Museum (2020) ===
“At once a social inquiry, a critical essay in art history and a sculptural study of people, paintings and space, Girls/Museum is thought-provoking, engaging and visually striking” -Jonathan Romney

“As a watcher, you are involved and encouraged to think or think along without the documentation having an instructive effect. This is also achieved with the help of the permanent change of intersection between proximity and distance, i.e. overall image and detail of the image. Silver thus offers the opportunity to view the individual works of art again from an almost intimate proximity.” -Wiebke Drescher

“The fact that such young women recognize their own captivity or their desires of carefreeness in the pictures deepens the character of each individual narrator with every minute. You learn about their fears and dreams. More than just snapshots of large masterpieces are created, because they form snapshots of a young generation and you get to know them briefly but intensively.” -Johanna Klima

== Exhibitions ==
Silver’s art has been exhibited in venues such as the Museum of Modern Art, the International Center of Photography, the Museum of Contemporary Art, Los Angeles, the Yokohama Museum of Art, the Pompidou Centre, the Kyoto National Museum, the Institute of Contemporary Arts, the Museo Reina Sofia, and the London, Singapore, New York, Moscow, and Berlin film festivals. Her work has been broadcast on BBC/England, PBS/USA, Arte, Planete/Europe, RTÉ/Ireland, SWR/Germany, and Atenor/Spain.

== Filmography ==
Year	Title	Length			
1986	Meet the People	16min.			
1989	Things I Forget to Tell Myself	2min.			
1990	We	4min.			
1989	getting in.	3min.			
1991	The Houses That Are Left	52min.			
1994	April 2	10min.			
1994	Fragments	Various			
1994	Former East/Former West	62min.			
1996	37 Stories About Leaving Home	52min.			
1999	small lies, Big Truth	19min.			
2003	1	70min.			
2003	suicide	70min.			
2004	What I'm Looking For	15min.			
2008	in complete world	53min.			
2009	5 Lessons and 9 Questions About Chinatown	10min.			
2013	TOUCH	68min.			
2015	The Lamps	4min.			
2017	A Strange New Beauty	51min.	2017	Frog Spider Hand Horse House	50min.
2018	Turn	4min.			
2018	This Film	7min.			
2019	a tiny place that is hard to touch 触れがたき小さな場所	39min.			
2019	Score for Joanna Kotze	4min.			
2020	Girls/Museum	71min.			
