= Amy Wilensky =

American writer of memoirs (born 1969)

- Born: 1969 (age 56–57)
- Occupation: writer

Amy Wilensky (born 1969) is an American writer who has published two memoirs. Passing for Normal: A Memoir of Compulsion (2000) is about her experience of Tourette syndrome and obsessive–compulsive disorder. The Weight of It: A Story of Two Sisters (2004) is about her sister's obesity.

== Early life and education ==
Wilensky grew up in the Boston suburb of Sudbury, Massachusetts. She was bullied as a child because of her Tourette syndrome. She attended Vassar College, and studied writing at Columbia University School of the Arts.

== Writing ==
Wilensky's Passing for Normal: A Memoir of Compulsion (Broadway Books, 2000) describes feeling shame and sadness as a child with obsessive–compulsive disorder (OCD) and Tourette syndrome. She had uncontrollable tics. The book has been described as demonstrating "the extreme lengths to which individuals with Tourette's may go to manage their symptoms in social settings". The journal Metapsychology said that the book was "frank and competently written" and would provide hope for "people who are odd in some way".

Her second book, The Weight of It: A Story of Two Sisters, was published in 2004 by Henry Holt and Company, and is about her sister's obesity. Publishers Weekly said that "Wilensky masterfully tells a story that she recognizes is not truly hers to tell". Kirkus Reviews said "Funny and affecting in parts, but on the whole disappointing".

== Personal life ==
Wilensky received cognitive behavioral therapy, anti-depressants and haloperidol to treat her conditions. She wrote in 2000 that "although some of the more deeply-ingrained tics and rituals do creep back in times of stress, I am largely free from the burdens they imposed for so long on my body and mind". She said that "Although I never set out to become a spokesperson for TS and OCD, my memoir has made me one".

Wilensky lives in New York City, and is married with two children.
