= Nick Mangano =

American stage actor and director

Nick Mangano is an American stage actor and director. He is the chair and artistic director of the Department of Theatre Arts at Stony Brook University.

== Education ==
Mangano studied in New York, attending Hunter College, where he achieved a BA in history, and Columbia University School of the Arts, earning an MFA in directing. He studied the Chekhov acting technique with the international Michael Chekhov Association, earning a certification of completion.

== Career ==
Mangano has worked in various aspects of theatre in the United States, including Broadway, and internationally. His direction has been favorably reviewed in The New York Times.
