= Kim Charles Kay =

American artist

- Born: Olympia, Washington
- Education: BFA Rhode Island School of Design
- Known for: Painting, Textile, Installation
- Website: www.kimcharleskay.com

Kim Charles Kay is an American interdisciplinary artist.

== Life and career ==
Kim Charles Kay was born in Olympia, Washington, and raised in "tiny timber towns" in the Pacific Northwest. She studied psychology, women's studies, and video & media theory, at Washington State University and The Evergreen State College, before graduating from Rhode Island School of Design with a BFA in Painting.

Kay collaborates with artists, educators, and researchers on projects. Kay and artist Lisi Raskin initiated MOTORPARK, a mobile collaborative platform at the ICA Maine College of Art, and held a discussion on the project at Marianne Boesky Gallery in New York City. Kay made costumes and set pieces for Jeanine Oleson's Hear, Here, an experimental opera that was presented at the New Museum in 2014. Kay's installation project, A Version of One Truth, was presented by the Kentucky Museum of Art and Craft in 2015, where she was an artist-in-residence.

As a teaching artist, Kay has created educational programs at Socrates Sculpture Park in Queens, NY, and at the Drawing Center in New York, NY. Recently she was awarded an artist residency at the Bubbler at Madison Public Library, in Madison, WI. Also in Madison, she co-founded EVERYDAY GAY HOLIDAY, "an unusual new art and literary studio."

Her installation Cat Mummies Came First, which was viewable night and day through a gallery's garage window from March 7 to May 30, 2020, at Sheherazade art space in Old Louisville, was "one of the few safe, in-person art experiences in Louisville" when museums and galleries closed to the public due to the COVID-19 pandemic. Critic Megan Bickel, in reviewing the exhibition, wrote that "Cat Mummies Came First grants observation of a lived experience as a juxtaposed historical and contemporaneous moment—one with remarkable affection for those of the present, past, and future. This feels like a prize or gift in this world that has changed with effervescence over-night."

== Awards and honors ==
- 2017 Bubbler at Madison Public Library residency
- 2016 Vermont Studio Center Fellowship
- 2012 Quimby Foundation Grant
- 2010 Benjamin A. Gilman International Scholarship, U.S. Department of State
