= Ann Gillen =

American sculptor

- Born: Washington, D.C.
- Occupation: sculptor

Ann Gillen is an American sculptor.

== Background ==
Gillen's sculpture is constructed, uses color, and suggests the human body in motion. She works with plywood, metal, stone, cardboard and solar panels—in 1990 used to power two stainless steel fountains she designed for a show at the Elaine Benson Gallery in Bridgehampton, Long Island. In 1960, two years after graduating from Pratt Institute, Gillen had her first solo exhibition at the E. Weyhe Gallery in Manhattan, renowned for showing prints.

All of Gillen's 30 public, private and corporate commissions were completed and installed on time and within their budgets. These commissions can be found in every borough of New York City save Staten Island. These include "Flying Red" on the sidewalk of 3 Ave. at 55 Street in Manhattan, the relief on the wall of The Bronx's Lincoln Hospital play yard, and a sculpture in front of a Queens public school. Lincoln Center for the Performing Arts was her largest commission on the walls columns and on two stairwells leading from the Garage Plaza to the Metropolitan Opera House. Walter Robinson wrote about the architects Diller Scofidio + Renfro painting over the commission when redoing Lincoln Center in 2007. Other important commissions include a NYC Percent of Art Relief for a Queens library and the CUNY Graduate School of Journalism. Gillen's tallest work is a 34′ sculpture for a Trenton NJ State office building while the smallest is a table top 1.5′ copper work for a private home.

Gillen trained in Industrial Design at Pratt and graduated in 1958, later earning an MFA from Columbia University School of the Arts in 1969. She has taught at Vassar College, Queens College, Empire State College, and The New School.

Mildred Constantine, associate curator of design at the Museum of Modern Art in New York, published and essay in Artists' Proof Magazine, "Letter Forms in Prints," which included a reproduction of Gillen's 12' long 1958 woodcut alongside Jasper Johns, Pierre Bonnard, and Joan Miró. She described Gillen's woodcut as "a section of a scroll book which she has produced as a departure from the customary bound book. In the section reproduced, the letters that she employs are not quite casually written. The carelessness is a studied carelessness, and her shapes are meaningfully emphasized."

Gillen won one of the three sculpture commissions for the 1980 Winter Olympics judged by Walter Hopps. She cut slate reliefs for five walls in the Ice Skating Building. She was invited to compete by the Port Authority for commissions in New York and New Jersey for Newark Airport, a Hudson River terminal, and the 42nd Street Bus Terminal.

Gillen was written up in New York City newspapers and magazines including The New York Times, the Daily News, and the New York Post, which featured some interviews and reviews but all with photos of the work. Other appearances were in Art in America, Art News, New York magazine, The Feminist Art Journal, and Viva magazine. Outside of New York, Gillen received coverage from The Boston Globe, the Cape Cod Times magazine, and the Philadelphia City Paper.

She was featured on New York TV, specifically Good Day New York, that filmed Gillen for three hours installing a fountain in a Central Park pond. Another appearance was with Ivan Karp, a gallerist representing the Art Dealers Association, in 1983 discussing women artists on WNYC TV.

Gillen was on the board of three feminist groups. She is included in the Brooklyn Museum's Elizabeth A Sackler Center for Feminist Art Base. In 1974 she designed the cover of Sojourner, a book of women's poetry and essays. She moderated a feminist class at the New School giving a lecture titled "What If the World's Art and Architecture Had Been Shaped by Women?" In 1973 she wrote, created the props for, and performed skits making fun of the art world at New York University titled "An Analysis of the Art World".

== Early life ==
Born in Washington, D.C., Gillen was raised in Brooklyn. Her mother graduated from Pratt and was a painter. Her mother's father was a gilder for the Frederick Keppler Gallery prior to World War I where Whistler was one of their artists. Her father's family farmed from mid 19th century in Sheepshead Bay, Brooklyn until the subway came through in 1904.

== Education ==
Gillen graduated from Pratt with a BFA in Industrial Design in 1958, a good time as Bauhaus form and structure exercises were the basis of the Industrial Design Department teaching. Later she earned a MFA from Columbia University in 1969 on full scholarship. While at Columbia she studied Italian Baroque art and architecture with. She continued her education by seeing Baroque art and architecture in situ in Italy, the public murals of José Clemente Orozco, Diego Riviera, and David Sequiros in Mexico.

Influences have been the reliefs of the Parthenon, the walkway reliefs of the Buddhist stupas, and the work of the Italian Baroque artists. She admires the sculpture of Brancusi, Alexander Archipenko, Henry Moore, Isamu Noguchi, and David Smith.

== Career ==
Gillen's sculpture is constructed groups of figures cut from planes or bent from lines within a geometric frame. Her aesthetic uses the Greek theory of matter, which considers geometric forms to explain spatial relationships. From the start she considers the work's axes, the resistance to gravity, the manner of construction, and the color dynamic. She incorporates how the piece will look in the round and works in series, using variations of logical distortions. In this vein, the first group of figures is what establishes the content of the ensuing series. She then moves the figures together, pulls them apart, and turns them upside down until they are completely distorted.

Gillen's work comes in the form of reliefs, free standing sculpture, or series. She constructs using sheet materials: metal, plywood, stone, and cardboard. Her use of color is an intentional and controlled application of pure color—red, yellow, blue, orange, and green—that is not mixed colors. From the beginning, each piece is evaluated for how it will hang on a wall or how the parts will join together. Commission pieces incorporate available light, weather, and site usage in addition to time, energy, edges and tensions, and geographic conditions.

== Commissions ==
Ann Gillen has had 30 public, corporate, and private commissions.

Commissions:

- 2013, Memorial for a Modern Dancer, H. Grebe-Grottewitz, Town Hall, Jena, Germany, 7 x 47 x 2″, rod
- 2007, CUNY Graduate School of Journalism, NYC (Thomson Architect), Triptych Stairwell Relief, stainless steel rod and tubes, red walls, 25 x 30 x 1.5′, indoors
- 1994–96, Lincoln Center for the Performing Arts, Inc, NYC (Thomson Architects), The Garage Plaza, painted relief-like murals for the wall, columns, 8 x (approx) 440′ and the walls of two stairwells that lead to the Metropolitan Opera House, each 19 x15′, indoors
- 1989, NJ State Council on the Arts, W. M. Ashby Building, 101 S.Broad St., Trenton (BAG Architects), Atrium Sculpture, aluminum pipe, 6 x 4″ O.D., baked paint, 34 x 22 x 28′, indoors
- 1987, NYC Board of Education, PS12, Woodside, Queens, NY, (Barbera Kulicke & Associates, Consultants), aluminum sculpture, sprayed paint, 12 x 12 x 5', outdoors
- 1987, NYC Percent for Art, Public Library, Queens, NY (Abraham Geller & Associates, Architects), aluminum sheet relief, painted, 19 x 44 x 5", indoors
- 1980, Greenwich, CT, private home (Debra Reiser, Architect), Triptych Relief, aluminum high relief, baked paint, 6 x 10.5 x 1 x .8', indoors
- 1980, XIII Olympic Games, Lake Placid, NY, (Hellmuth, Obata, Kassabaum, Architects), national competition, total relief 98 ft., 22, Vermont slate each 3 x 5 x .5', indoors

There are 22 more public, private, and corporate commissions that are not yet listed.

Additionally Gillen has been commissioned by the NYC Board of Education and NYC Percent for Art.

== Exhibitions ==
Gillen has had 17 solo shows and reviews and features by The New York Times. Gillen's work has been shown primarily in New York City and New England but also in Milano, Zurich, and Dublin. Her sculpture FLYING RED has been installed on the sidewalk on 3 Ave at 55 Street since 1987. There were indoor and outdoor retrospectives at Vassar College and Wave Hill in 1977.

Harvard's Fogg Museum and The Brooklyn Museum have a 1958 12-inch scroll book of Gillen's in their collections. She has a metal relief and drawing in the Herbert and Dorothy Vogel collections at the Smithsonian Institution and Bowdoin College. A catalogue and book of drawings from a 2001 Robert Pardo show in Chelsea is featured at the Getty Museum's Archive of Irving Sandler.

Gillen's sculpture has been shown both indoors and outdoors. Her major solo exhibitions include CUNY Tech Brooklyn, 1984; Bellevue Hospital Park, 1983–1984; Wave Hill, 1977; Vassar College, 1976; the Stamford Museum in Connecticut; and the U.S. Court House Grand Lobby at Foley Square, New York City. Her first solo exhibition was in 1961 at the Weyhe Gallery in Manhattan, two years after graduating from Pratt, where she showed colored woodcut hand-printed books.

Selected Group exhibitions include: Pratt Institute's Sculpture Park 2015–; the SoHo Bruce High Quality Foundation Brucennial in 2010; ARTIFACT Gallery in New York City, Milano, and Zurich 2005–2007; Snug Harbor, Staten Island 1995–1996; Hunts Point Food Center Sculpture Park, the Bronx 1990–1992; The Cape Museum of Fine Arts; Max Hutchinson's Sculpture Fields 1990; Central Park 1989; Royal Hibernian Gallery, Dublin 1988; Candidates for Art Awards, American Academy of Arts and Letters 1979; Storm King Art Center 1973–1975.

Gillen was a winner of a NEA funded (judged by Walter Hopps) national sculpture competition for the 1980 Winter Olympics at Lake Placid. For five walls in the Ice Skating Building, she cut five units of contiguous, cut-out slate reliefs in the 210-foot-long corridor. A total of 22 stones, each approximately 3 × 6 feet × 3/4 inch, described as "the representation of figures in motion."

Gillen designed the Tucker Award in 1977 for the Building Stone Institute. The 1′ slate sculpture was awarded for excellence in stone work by architects and contractors with Hugh Hardy of Hardy Holzman Pfeiffer Associates and Richard Foster as the first judges.

=== Solo exhibitions ===
- 2001, Lattuada/Pardo Gallery, Italy, marble sculpture
- 2000, Robert Pardo Gallery, NYC, "Marble Matter", sculpture
- 1994, Broome St. NYC, "Private Sculpture, Bodies and Parts", marble and stainless steel sculpture
- 1993, Group Gallery, Provincetown, MA, "Bathing Beauties", sculpture
- 1990–85, Elaine Benson Gallery, Bridgehampton, NY, "Solar Fountains," sculpture, indoors and outdoors
- 1984, Stamford Museum, Stamford, CT, "Studies", sculpture, indoors and outdoors
- 1984, CUNY Tech, Quadrangle Sculpture Garden, Brooklyn, NY, "Spring Exercise," sculpture outdoors
- 1984–83, Bellevue Hospital Park, NYC, "Three Related Sculptures," outdoors
- 1979, Art Latitude Gallery, 73rd Street and Madison Avenue, NYC, sculpture indoors and out
- 1977, Wave Hill, Riverdale, NYC, "Sculpture Retrospective," indoors and outdoors
- 1976, Vassar College Art Gallery, Poughkeepsie, NY, sculpture, indoors and outdoors

=== Group exhibitions ===
- 2010, BRUCENNIAL, SoHo, NYC, Bruce High Quality Foundation Exhibition, woodcut
- 2006, From Postwar to Postmodernism, Columbia University, NYC, sculpture, indoors
- 1996, Cape Museum of Fine Arts, Dennis, MA (Curator: Gilbert Franklin), sculpture, outdoors
- 1996–95, WCA's "Women Sculptors of the '90s," Snug Harbor, NYC (Curator: CS Rubenstein), outdoors
- 1995, "Sculpture,: Valle d'Aosta Italy, maquette
- 1994, Lookout Sculpture Park, Damascus, PA (Curator: Susanne Wibroe), sculpture, outdoor
- 1992-90, Hunts Point Food Center Sculpture Park, Bronx, NYC (Curator: Tom Finklepearl), sculptures, outdoors
- 1990, Max Hutchinson's Sculpture Fields, Kenoza Lake, NY, sculpture, outdoors
- 1990, The Notion of Motion, Slip Art Museum, NY (Curator: Karen Shaw), solar powered fountains, indoors
- 1989, Noah's Art, Central Park, NYC Department of Parks, Fountain (Curator: Margaret Tsirantonakis)
- 1989, Contemporary Sculpture, '89, Chesterwood, Stockbridge, MA (Curator: L Dimmick & J Fairbanks), outdoors

== Recent work ==
Gillen collaborated with poet Eileen Hennessy to make full-page prints to accompany Hennessy's 2015 book Places We Have Lived Before. Pratt Institute commissioned and built LEANING 2014, for its sculpture park. In 2014 a 4.5' long relief was installed in the Town hall of Jena, Germany, to memorialize a modern dancer.

Her last solo show was in 2000 at the Robert Pardo Gallery in Chelsea, called MARBLE MATTER. It was the second show of her marble and stainless steel work. Her marble sculpture was describe as "an eccentric moment in her work... She has created sculpture in an ironic play with classical forms... The suggestion of the human body, alone and in groups, remains the constant in all her work"

== Mentions ==
Selected reviews and mentions:

- The Brucennial Gillen participated in was written up in The New York Times
- Gillen was interviewed by Stanley Collyer and chosen of the cover of Competitions Magazine.
- a photograph of Ann Gillen's piece "Three Graces" in the garden of the Art Latitude gallery was featured in The New York Times.
- Gillen's "Heroic Woman," exhibited at the Cape Museum of Fine Arts, was featured in Cape Cod Times Magazine.
- Gillen's loft and studio was featured in the Berlin Art Festival Catalogue.
- The New York Times reviewed Gillen's work "Ann Gillen: Sculpture and Banners" in the Grand Lobby, United States Courthouse at Foley Square.
- Gillen's "Untitled Forms" as part of the exhibition "In Three Dimensions: Women Sculptors in the 90s" at Snug Harbor Cultural Center was reviewed by The New York Times.
- Gillen's design for the prestigious Tucker Award for architecture was mentioned in The Evening Bulletin.
- Gillen's pieces for the 1980 Olympics were featured in a review of the Olympic mural commissions.
- A photo and interview of Gillen and her piece "Flying Red" installed at her solo Wave Hill and featured in the New York Post.
- A profile of Gillen and detail about her artistry in residence in Vermont in preparation for the 1980 winter Olympics friezes.
