= Lisi Raskin =

American artist (born 1974)

- Born: 1974 (age 50–51); Miami, Florida
- Education: BA Brandeis University; MFA Columbia University School of the Arts
- Known for: Painting, sculpture, installation art
- Awards: Creative Time Global Residency, Artist's Fellowship Inc, Mayer Foundation Fellowship, Berlin Prize, Hayward Prize: American Austrian Foundation, Mortimer Hays Traveling Fellowship
- Website: lisiraskin.net

Lisi Raskin (born 1974) is an artist known for creating large-scale, architectural environments that refer to the often clandestine fallout shelters and missile silos constructed during the Cold War. Raskin performs rigorous field research in order to understand these architectures and the stories embedded within them. In an effort to articulate the nuance of alternate narratives, Raskin often stages performances and displays discrete art objects ranging from drawings and paintings to sculpture within their installations. Often Raskin employs the assistance of their male, German, alter-ego, Herr Doktor Wolfgang Hauptman to exorcise repressed cultural narratives that lurk in their choice of subject matter.

== Early life and education ==
Raskin was born in Miami, Florida, the eldest of four children. They grew up in a newly forming, suburban housing development, a location they have referred to as the site of their earliest adventures, play, and invention in the landscape. In 1996 Raskin received a BA from Brandeis University. In 2003, they received an MFA from Columbia University in New York City. While at Columbia, Raskin studied with Jon Kessler, Kara Walker, Coco Fusco, Dana Hoey and anthropologist Michael Taussig.

== Work ==
In 2013 Raskin traveled to Afghanistan as part of Creative Time Global Residency Program. In 2005, Raskin was awarded the Berlin Prize at the American Academy in Berlin. They were an artist in residence at IASPIS in Stockholm for most of 2007 and in 2008, Raskin was an artist in residence at the Center for Curatorial Studies and Art in Contemporary Culture at Bard College.

Raskin made their New York gallery debut in May 2007 at Guild & Greyshkul after having exhibited in various galleries and institutions including Galleria Riccardo Crespi, Socrates Sculpture Park, PS1/MoMa, Kuenstlerhaus Bethanien, and Artists Space. Since then Raskin has had solo gallery shows at Milliken in Stockholm, Reception in Berlin and Churner and Churner in New York.

Raskin participated in the 2008 Art Show at the Park Avenue Armory. Their work at the Armory show was a military-like installation, referring to the Titan Missile program and Curtis LeMay. Raskin's work was featured at the 11th International Istanbul Biennale, the 2nd Athens Biennale, and the 3rd Singapore Biennale.

In 2015, Motorpark, Raskin's collaboration with Kim Charles Kay was presented at Kentucky Museum of Art and Craft. Motorpark is a collaborative platform founded with Kay in 2012, initially involving the retrofit of a 1996 Blue-Bird school bus.

== Teaching ==
Raskin is currently an Associate Professor in the Department of Sculpture at the Rhode Island School of Design, From 2013 to 2016, Raskin was an associate professor in the Department of Painting, Drawing, and Sculpture at Tyler School of Art, Temple University in Philadelphia, Pennsylvania.

== Publications ==
- Lisi Raskin, Thought Crimes (Berlin: Kuenstlerhaus Bethanien, GmbH, 2005). ISBN 3-932754-58-1.
- Lisi Raskin, Mobile Observation' (Milan: Riccardo Crespi, 2009). ISBN 0-615-30525-3.
