= Yasue Maetake =

New York City-based sculptor (born 1973)

Yasue Maetake (born 1973 in Tokyo, Japan) is a New York City-based sculptor. Her work, in glass, among other materials, deals with the environment and nature's reaction to the man-made; it has been shown in Berlin, the Netherlands, the Czech Republic, Puerto Rico and in New York City, San Diego, Las Vegas, and Miami. Her exhibitions have been reviewed in Artforum, Flash Art, Art in America, Modern Painters, the New York Times, TimeOut New York, and Miami New Times.

In 2018, Artsy named her one of 20 female artists advancing the field of sculpture.

== Education ==
She attended Toyama City Institute of Glass Art and Columbia University's MFA program.
