= Marc Moss =

American screenwriter

Marc Moss is an American screenwriter raised in Norfolk, Virginia. He received his BA from the University of Chicago and his MFA from Columbia University School of the Arts.

Moss was credited with the feature films Along Came a Spider (2001), starring Morgan Freeman and Monica Potter, and Alex Cross (2012), starring Tyler Perry and Matthew Fox.

He has also doctored numerous films including Kiss the Girls (1997), starring Ashley Judd and Morgan Freeman; Runaway Jury (2003), featuring John Cusack and Academy Award winners Dustin Hoffman and Gene Hackman; Shooter (2007), starring Mark Wahlberg; and Homefront (2014), starring Jason Statham and James Franco.
