= Esteban Cabeza de Baca =

American painter from California

- Born: 1985 (age 40–41); San Ysidro, California
- Citizenship: American
- Education: Cooper Union, Columbia University
- Known for: Painting
- Website: estebancabezadebaca.com

Esteban Cabeza de Baca (born 1985) is an American painter who lives and works between Queens, New York, and the US Southwest, whose abstract landscapes explore environmental and border issues.

He received a BFA from Cooper Union, School of the Arts in 2010 and an MFA from Columbia University School of the Arts in 2014.

== Biography ==
=== Early life ===
Esteban Cabeza de Baca was born in 1985 in San Ysidro, California, at the U.S.–Mexico border. His father and mother were active in the Brown Berets, as well as the Chicano, American Indian, and Black Panther movements. His father was a historian and his mother was a union organizer. Cabeza de Baca was heavily influenced by the border town's position, as well as his Indigenous and Mexican heritage. He was also influenced by his parents, whose political passions and concern for human dignity led them to shelter undocumented migrants in their home during his youth. This deeply influences his exploration of themes such as colonialism, migration, and cultural memory in his art.

=== Professional life ===
Cabeza de Baca currently holds the position of Assistant Professor of Painting at Oberlin College. He previously taught at Purchase College. His topics include Colonization and Color, the Generated Image, Painting Identity, Plein-Air to the Studio: Landscape and Figure.

=== Some artworks ===
"Acequias”, Acrylic on canvas, 5ftx10ft, 2024

“Blue Rider”, Acrylic on canvas, 6x6ft, 2024

“From Here To Eternity”, Acrylic on canvas, 40x40 inches, 2024

“Wandering”, Acrylic on canvas, 2024, 76 x 54 in.

“Rolas”, Acrylic and cochineal on canvas, 6ftx6ft, 2024

“The Meek Shall Inherit The Earth”, Acrylic and cochineal on canvas, 6ftx6ft, 2024

“Blood In The Fields”, Acrylic and cochineal on canvas, 6ftx6ft, 2024

"Suenos" Acrylic and cochineal on canvas 30x 30, 2024

"Beaver Moon", Acrylic on canvas, 6x18ft, 2022

"Winter Solstice", Acrylic on canvas, 5ftx5ft, 2020

== Artistic style ==
Cabeza de Baca employs disparate painterly techniques in his work, mixing graffiti, landscape, and pre-Columbian pictographs—confounding Cartesian single-point perspective. His influences extend from petroglyphs to Jackson Pollock, who was in turn influenced by Navajo sand painting. "I want to excavate the impact of colonial acts like that," says Cabeza de Baca. "To go farther with the drip than Pollock did and collide the infinite with the everyday." With his indigenous background, he also draws from the work of Native painters including Jaune Quick-to-See Smith.

Cabeza de Baca regularly begins his works en plein air, recasting the act of landscape painting, that was a favored surveying tool of colonizers. In Tsankawi (2018), the artist depicts the Bandelier National Monument in New Mexico viewed from a Pueblo cave. Spray paint traverses the picture's layers, forming abstractions that recall characters from Rembrandt's The Blinding of Samson. A spiral wall carving drifts from the cave's walls into the center of the canvas, disrupting perspectival cohesion, and foregrounding the eternal form. Among other things, Cabeza de Baca's complex techniques and influences reveal the dialectical dynamics between colonialism and its critique.

== Awards ==
Cabeza de Baca has received numerous grants and awards including, a Robert Gamblin Painting Grant (2013); a Stern Fellowship, Columbia University (2013); a Sharpe-Walentas Studio Program Award (2014); a Stokroos Foundation Grant (2017); and a Henk en Victoria de Heus Fellowship (2018). NYFA Painting Fellowship (2021); and a Civitella Ranieri Visual Art Fellowship (2024)

== Exhibitions ==
His work has been the subject of numerous solo exhibitions, such as: Bluer Than a Sky Weeping Bones, Gaa Gallery, (2016, Provincetown, MA); Unlearn, Fons Welters Gallery, (2018, Amsterdam); Verano, with Heidi Howard, Gaa Gallery, (2018, Wellfleet, MA); Esteban Cabeza de Baca, Gaa Projects (2019, Cologne); Worlds without Borders, Boers-Li Gallery (2019, New York); and Esteban Cabeza de Baca – Life is one drop in limitless oceans ... , Kunstfort Vijfhuizen, (2019, Amsterdam). He has participated in over 15 group exhibitions at venues such as the Leroy Neiman Art Center (2014, 2015, New York), the Yale University School of Sacred Music (2017, New Haven, CT), the Dutch Royal Palace (2018, Amsterdam, Netherlands), the Drawing Center (2019, New York), and Let Earth Breathe at The Momentary (2022) among others. Recent solo exhibitions include Alma at Garth Greenan Gallery (2023), Cesar's Angels at Parker Gallery (2024), and Esteban Cabeza de Baca: Memories of the Future at San Luis Obispo Museum of Art (2025).

== Collections ==
Cabeza de Baca's works are held in the following permanent collections:

- Bunker Art Space, West Palm Beach, Florida
- El Espacio 23, Miami, Florida
- Harvard University, Cambridge, Massachusetts
- North Dakota Museum of Art, Grand Forks, North Dakota
- Museum of Contemporary Art San Diego, San Diego, California
- Parrish Art Museum, Water Mill, New York
- Phoenix Art Museum, Phoenix, Arizona
- Williams College Museum of Art, Williamstown, Massachusetts
