= Einat Amir =

Artist and researcher

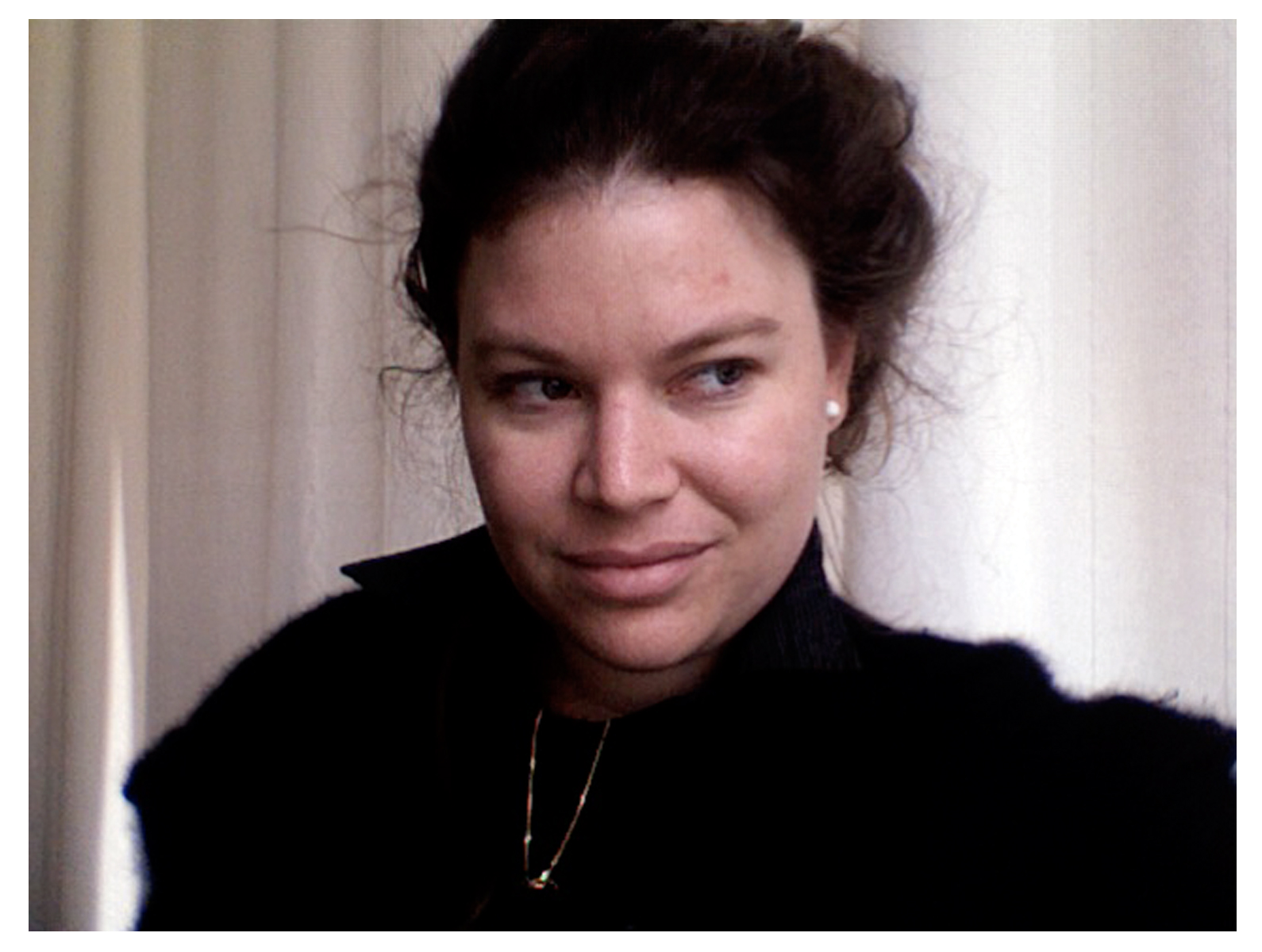
- Born: 1979 (age 46–47); Jerusalem
- Education: Aalto University in Finland; Columbia University School of the Arts in New York
- Website: einatamir.com

Einat Amir (born 1979) is an interdisciplinary artist and researcher, living and working in Finland. Her work combines film and video installation with performance, and focuses on examining socio-political issues through the framework of psychology. In her research, she focuses on the possibilities and application of collaboration between science and art.

== Early life and education ==
Amir was born in 1979 in Jerusalem. In 2001, she was awarded the fellowship for outstanding students from the Ministry of Education in Israel. In 2004, she received her B.ed. (with honors) HaMidrasha School of Art, Beit Berl College in Israel, and was the recipient of the school's Excellency Award. After receiving an Agnes Martin Scholarship, and subsequently the Artis Fellowship, as well as the Study Fellowship America-Israel Cultural Foundation, she attained her M.F.A. in 2009 from Columbia University School of the Arts in New York. She earned her doctoral degree (DA) from the Department of Art & Media and the Department of Neuroscience & Biomedical Engineering at Aalto University, Finland.

== Artistic Career ==
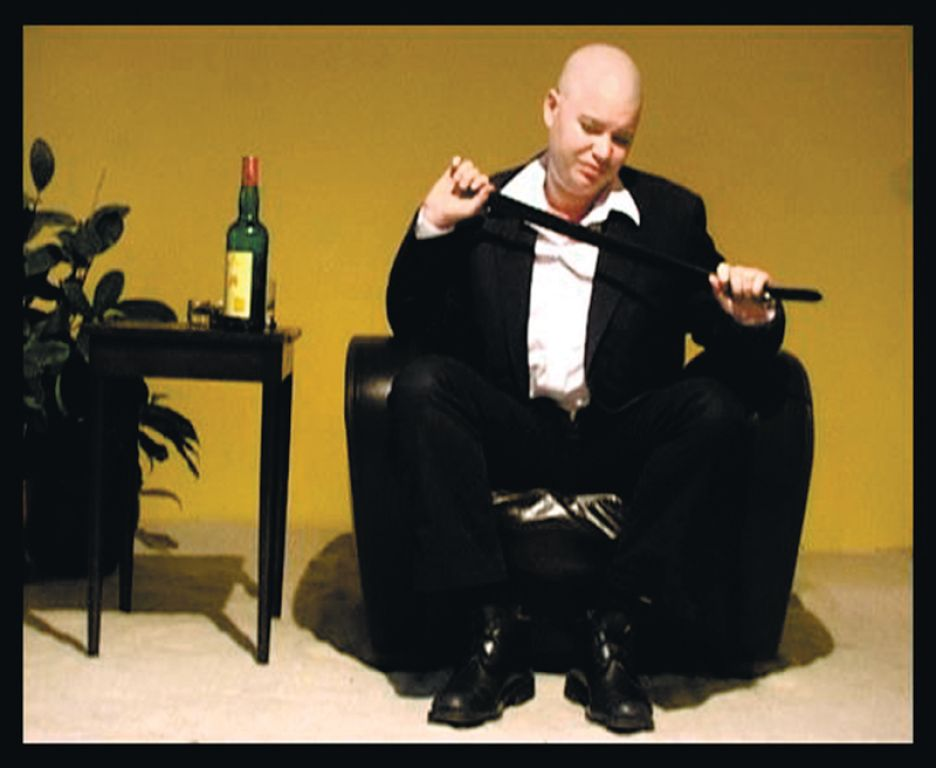
Einat Amir, Women Dancing, 2004

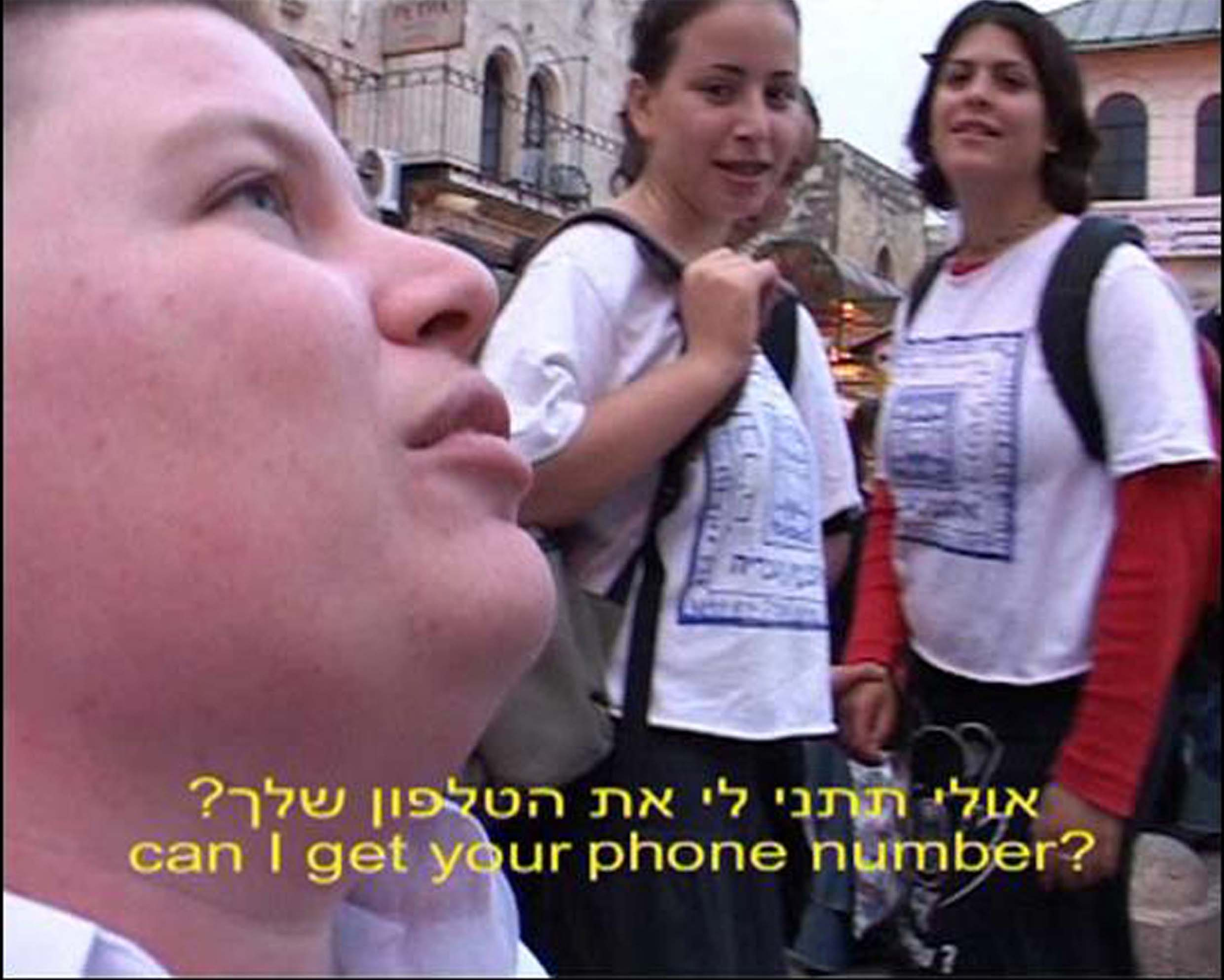
Einat Amir, Boi, 2004

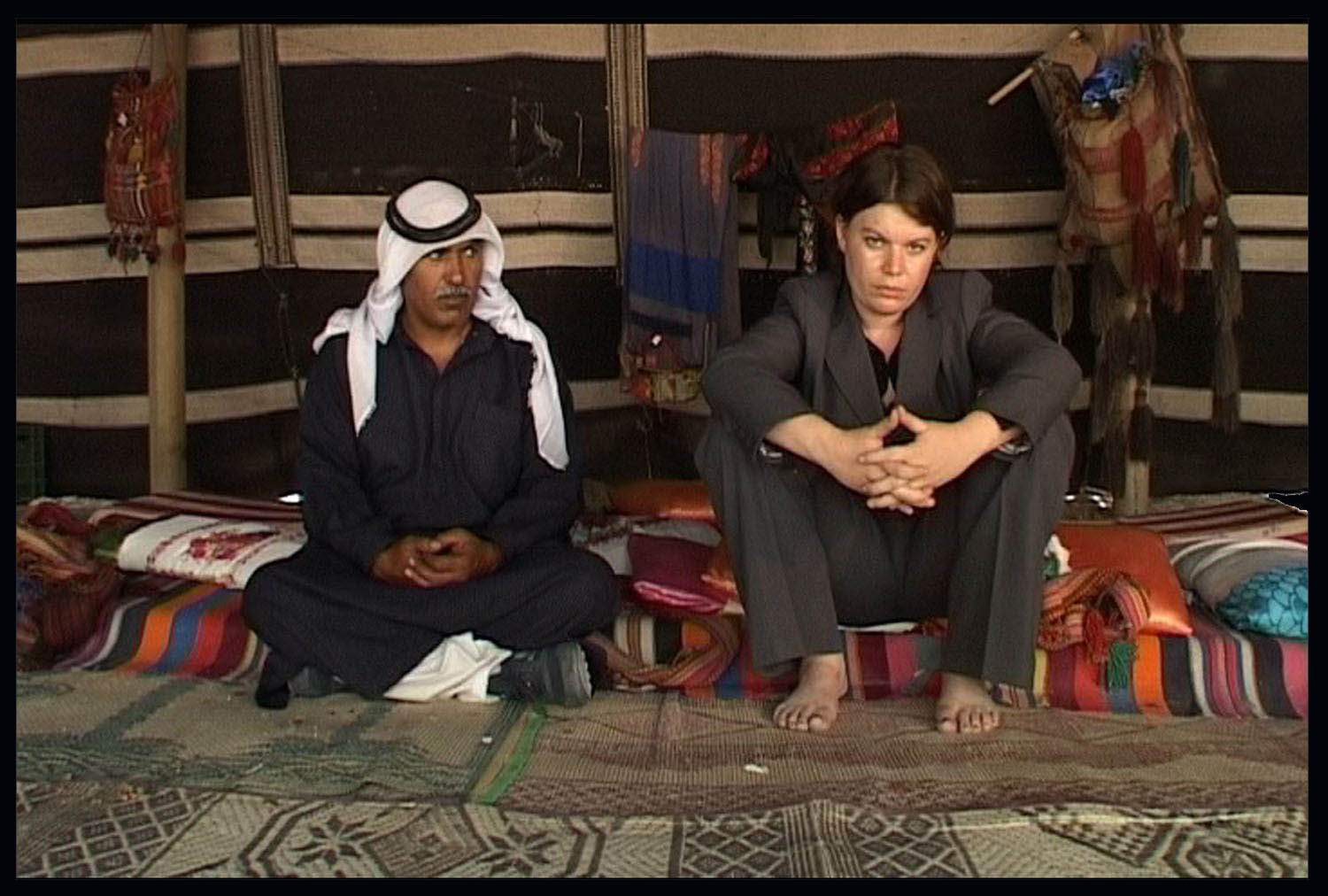
Einat Amir, Acknowledgement, 2007

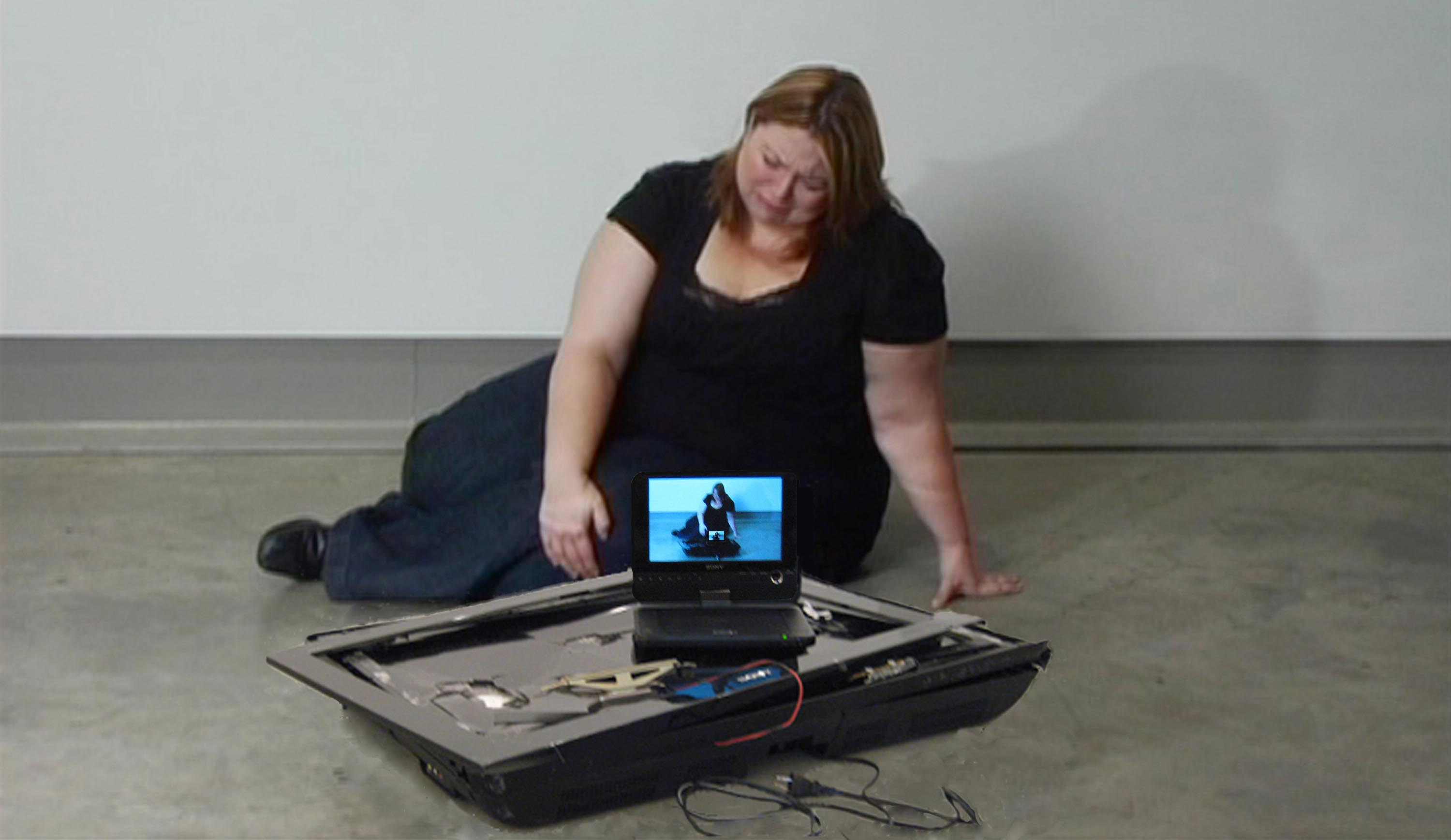
Einat Amir, Ideal Viewer, 2009

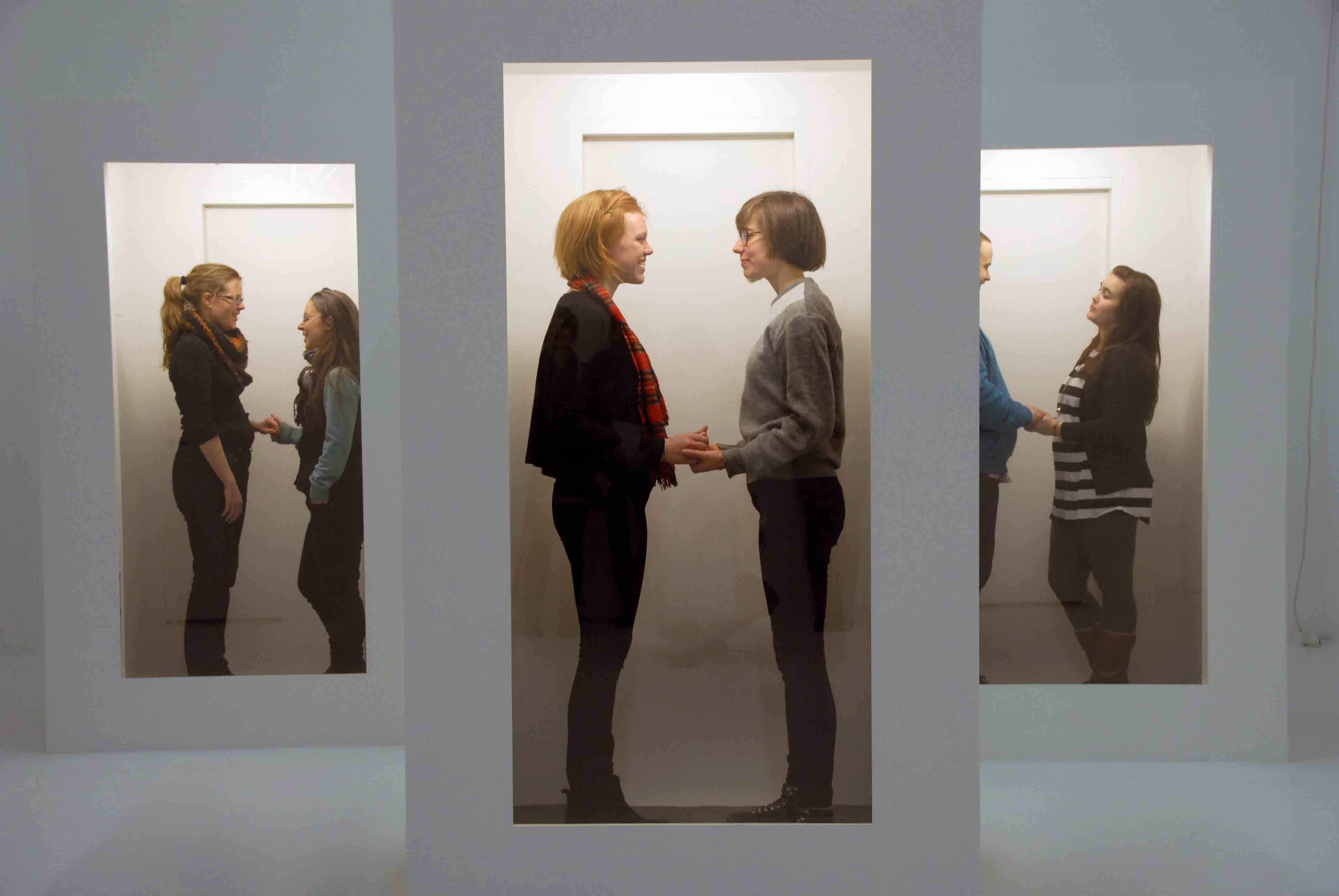
Einat Amir, Enough About You, 2011

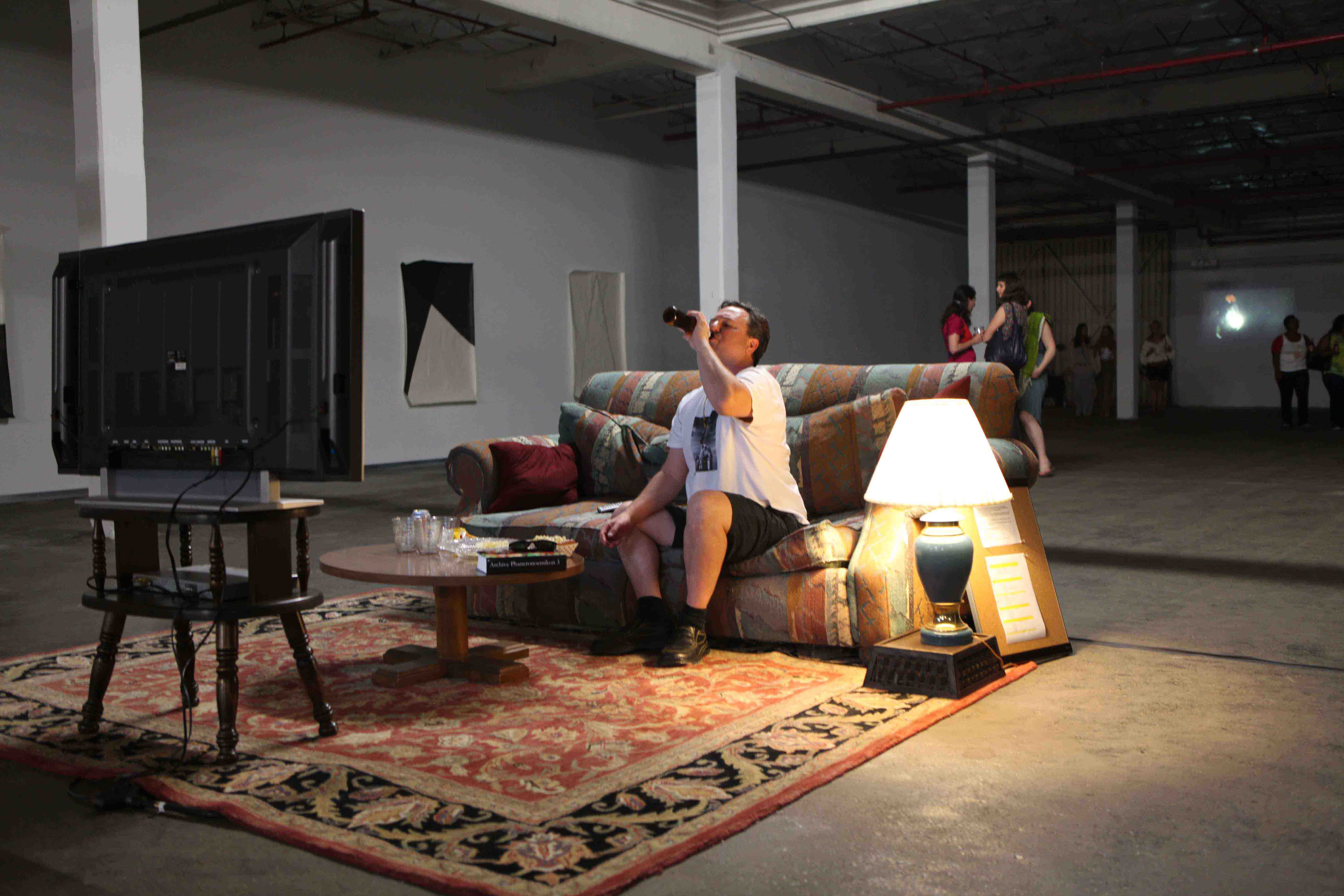
Einat Amir, Coming Soon Near You, 2011

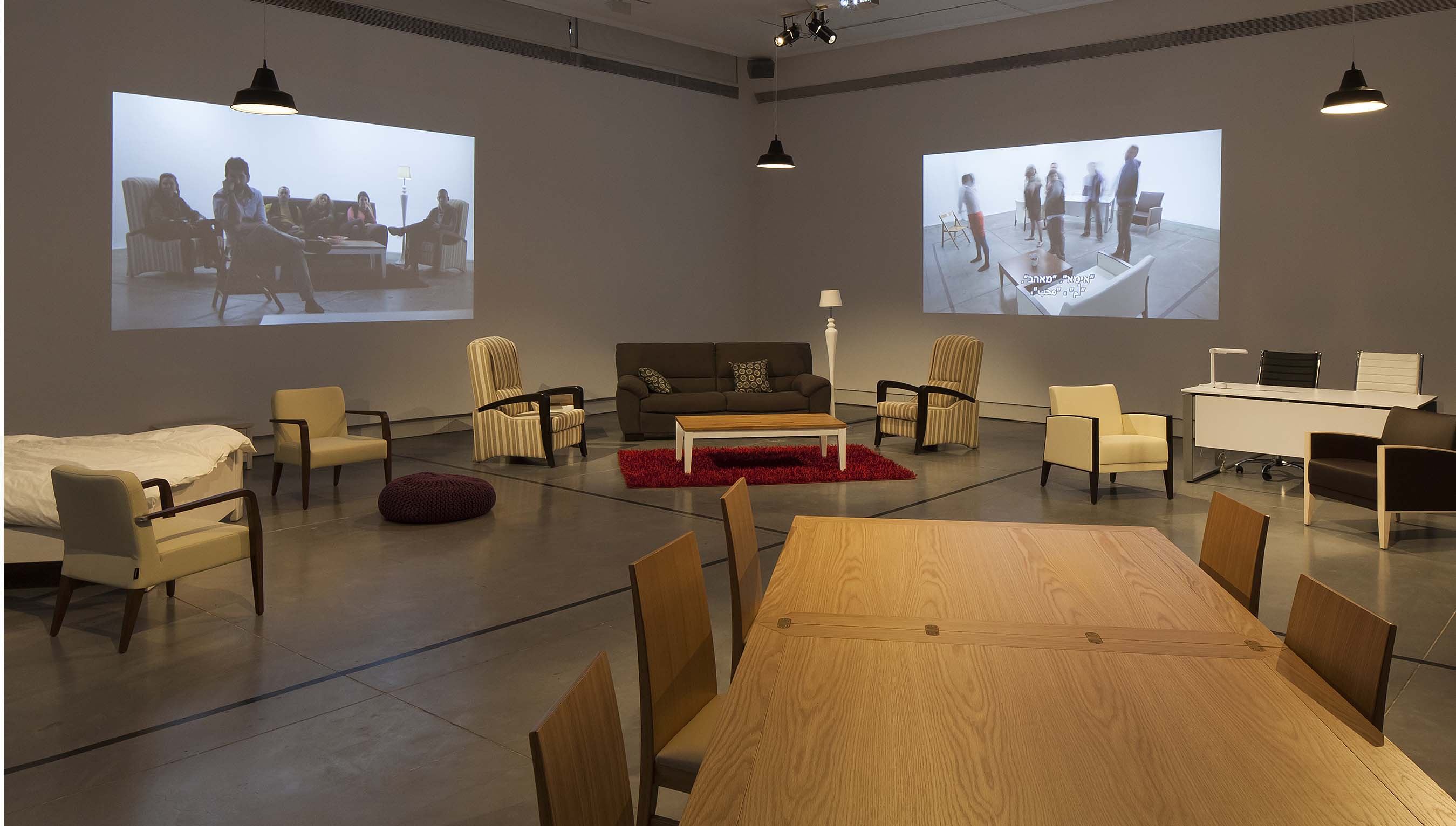
Einat Amir, Our Best Intentions, 2013

Amir has exhibited at many museums and art venues internationally. Some of her better-known works are Women Dancing (2004), Boi (2004), Disgraceful retreat (2005), Acknowledgement (2007), Ideal Viewer (2009) and Enough About You (2011), Our Best Intentions (2013), As Much As You Want (2018)

Amir’s artworks has been shown at; MoMA PS1 New York, PERFORMA13 New York, Manifesta12 Palermo, Palais De Tokyo Paris, MAXXI National Museum of Rome, Istanbul Museum of Modern Art Turkey, NGV Triennial in Melbourne, The 6th Thessaloniki Biennale, Whitechapel Gallery London, The Kitchen New York, Museum of Contemporary Art in Roskilde, Bergen Kunsthall Norway, Dallas Contemporary Art Center Texas, Tel Aviv Museum Israel, The Israel Museum, and Lilith Performance Studio Malmö, among other venues.

She held a residency from the Antonio Ratti Foundation in Italy in 2008, and in 2011 Amir held a residency at Palais de Tokyo, at La Pavillon in Paris.She was awarded the Young Artist Award from the Ministry of Culture, Israel in 2012 as well. In 2013, she was a grant recipient for Artis and held a residency at ArtPort Art Center in Tel Aviv, Israel. In 2014, she held a residency at the Hyde Park Art Center in Chicago, IL. In 2016 she had received the Lighton International Artists Exchange Award, and held a residency in Bemis Art Center, Omaha, NE. In 2018, she held a residency at Iaspis, Stockholm, Sweden and received the CEC ArtsLink Independent Projects award.

== Artworks Themes and Art-Science Collaborations ==
Amir's video and performance-based work present staged interventions and situations that cross fiction with reality. Amir has appeared in some of her own works, and also makes use of actors and willing audience as participants in structured interactions in controlled environments, to illustrate and challenge societal norms. Her earlier works are about issues of gender and social identity, and relate to her experience as a gay artist living and working in Israeli society. Some of her works focus on the effects on individual people of power relationships structured by societal norms.

Since 2016, Amir has collaborated extensively with social scientists in creating collaborative work that generates social change. Her current work focuses on the nature of such collaboration, and how can artists and scientists work together to create a new medium, one that could potentially lead to novel solutions to the complex social and environmental problems of today's global reality. Her academic research has been published in several academic publications including Nature Communications and Leonardo Journal.

Her artworks were reviewed by national and international media.
