= Binnie Kirshenbaum =

American novelist and short story writer

Binnie Kirshenbaum is an American novelist and short story writer. She is a professor of the Writing Program at Columbia University School of the Arts.

== Biography ==
Born in 1964, Kirshenbaum received a BA from Columbia University and an MFA from Brooklyn College. She has been a professor of Fiction Writing at Columbia University School of the Arts since 2003.

== Writings ==
Kirshenbaum published her first book of ten short stories, Married Life and Other True Adventures, in 1990. In 1992, Kirshenbaum published her first novel, On Mermaid Avenue, named for the address of Coney Island's Cyclone rollercoaster. The Boston Globe said it was "A nifty variation on the loss-of-innocence theme....sure-handed, a bright, comic trinket."

Her third book, A Disturbance in One Place was published in 1994. Norman Mailer said about it that, "not many young female novelists can deal with sex, the appetite for it, and the loss of such appetite with as much candor, lack of self-protection, and humor as Binnie Kirshenbaum", and the work was selected as a Barnes and Noble Discover New Authors book and for a Critics Choice Award.

In 1995, Kirshenbaum published her fourth book, a collection of short stories called History on a Personal Note. It was followed in 2000 by the novel Pure Poetry. Hester Among the Ruins (2002) was Kirshenbaum's fourth novel. It was recognized as a Chicago Tribune Favorite Book of the Year and was a nominee for the American Jewish Book Award. An Almost Perfect Moment was Kirshenbaum's fifth novel. Kirshenbaum's The Scenic Route was published in 2009.

Rabbits for Food, Kirshenbaum's seventh novel, was chosen as one of NPR's Favorite Books of the Year, and as a New York Times Editor's Choice and Notable Book of 2019. Nancy Pearl, book reviewer for NPR, chose it as the best work of fiction of 2019 and one of the thirteen best fiction books of the decade. Caroline Leavitt, reviewing the novel in The Boston Globe, wrote, "The book achieves absolute genius." and Deborah Eisenberg wrote, "Brilliant insight and gleaming prose light up this report from the darkest interior."

Called a "tour de force" by Publishers Weekly, Kirshenbaum's eighth novel, Counting Backwards, was a New York Times Editors' Choice and one of Lit Hub's Most Anticipated Books of 2025. Reviewing it in The Washington Post, Justin Taylor wrote that Kirshenbaum "has not lost her knack for narrative propulsion or her ear for pitch-black comedy... I know it's only March, but I'm calling it anyway: Counting Backwards is the feel-bad novel of the year." and Kimberly King Parsons wrote, "Kirshenbaum has always been a bold and outrageously gifted writer, but this novel is her finest yet."

== Critical reception ==
Kirshenbaum's novels have been chosen as Notable Books of the Year by The New York Times, The Chicago Tribune, NPR, Time, The San Francisco Chronicle and The Washington Post. She has twice won Critics Choice Awards, and she was selected by Granta as one of the Best Young American novelists. She has published short fiction and essays in many magazines and anthologies and her work has been widely translated.

According to Richard Eder of The New York Times, "Ms. Kirshenbaum's comedy has fizz and bite. She handles interrogation, passionate love, her ... characters and what they seem to represent with disconcerting sleight of hand." Richard Howard wrote of her, "This author is indeed a humorist, even a comedian, a sort of stand-up tragic." In its review of A Disturbance In One Place, the San Francisco Chronicle said, "Kirshenbaum refuses to corral what is funny or sad into separate camps, but allows one to flip over into the other, creating unexpectedly poignant effects."

== Works ==
=== Novels ===
- On Mermaid Avenue (1992) ISBN 978-0880641562*
- A Disturbance in One Place (1994) ISBN 978-0-06-052088-5
- Pure Poetry (2000) ISBN 978-0-684-86471-6
- Hester Among the Ruins (2002) ISBN 978-0-393-04152-1
- An Almost Perfect Moment (2004) ISBN 978-0-393-04152-1
- The Scenic Route (2009) ISBN 978-0-06-078474-4
- Rabbits for Food (2019) ISBN 9781641290531
- Counting Backwards. 2025. ISBN 978-1-64129-468-3.

=== Story collections ===
- Married Life and Other True Adventures (1990) ISBN 978-0-89594-398-9
- History on a Personal Note (1995) ISBN 978-0-06-052089-2
