= Nadja Verena Marcin =

Visual artist and organizer

Nadja Verena
- Born: 1982 (age 43–44); Würzburg, Germany
- Education: Bachelor of Fine Arts, Kunstakademie Münster; Master of Visual Arts, Columbia University
- Alma mater: Columbia University
- Occupation: Feminist Artist
- Known for: #SOPHYGRAY; OPHELIA

Nadja Verena Marcin (1982-present) is a Berlin and New York-based visual artist, performance artist, and filmmaker. Her work examines themes of gender, history, morality, psychology, and human behavior, through an intersectional feminist lens. Marcin's practice integrates elements of theater and cinema, frequently exploring the representation of women in media.

She often reinterprets well-known images or scenes from advertising and film history, addressing issues such as gendered violence and societal norms. One of her notable works, Ophelia, revisits the iconic figure from literature and art history, offering a contemporary perspective on a subject that has been portrayed in various forms over centuries.

Marcin is the founder and director of Kunstraum, a gallery and artist hub located close by the Brooklyn Navy Yard. Kunstraum aims to support emerging artists and promote interdisciplinary collaboration among artists, curators, writers, filmmakers, and architects, with a focus on advancing contemporary international art.

== Biography ==
Nadja Verena Marcin was born 1982 in Würzburg, Germany. In 2010, she obtained a Master's degree of Visual Arts at Columbia University School of the Visual Arts in New York, specializing in New Genres. Prior to this, she graduated with honors from Kunstakademie Münster, where she earned a Bachelor' s degree in Fine Arts with a focus on New Media.

== Career ==
In 2005, Marcin participated in Videonale 10 at Kunstmuseum Bonn with the video work Sissi.In 2007, Marcin took part in Videonale 11 at Kunstmuseum Bonn with the video work Jogginggehenmusemassnahme.

In 2006, Marcin held her first solo gallery exhibition at Kapinos Gallery in Berlin.

In 2008, Marcin was included in Videonale 11 on Tour at Mediations Biennale in the section European Attitude. That same year, her work was shown in Asia Europe Mediations in Zendai MoMA, Shanghai – nowadays Himalayas Art Museum. In 2009, her work Sissi was acquired by the MONA Collection.

In 2010, Marcin performed Nadja by Breton at the opening ceremony of the Columbia University School of the Arts MFA show at Fischer Landau Center for Art.

In 2013 SMAK founder Jan Hoet invited Marcin to exhibit and perform Nadja by Breton at the opening ceremony of Middle Gate Geel'13 alongside works by Louise Bourgeois, Mike Kelley, Rene Magritte, Paul McCarthy, Bruce Nauman, ORLAN, Pablo Picasso, Gerhardt Richter, and Franz West. Also in 2013, Marcin held her first solo gallery exhibition Zero Gravity in New York at 532 Gallery, which was reviewed in 2013 by Miami New Times.

In 2015, Marcin co-founded KUNSTRAUM with architect Fernando Schrupp Rivero.

In 2016, KUNSTRAUM won the Artspace Fairgoer Awards: NADA New York 2016 Edition with VIDEO SHOP described as "showcasing artist-authorized bootlegs editions of DVDs in a video store recreation" that "stood out in a manner of iconic, throw-back glory" in HuffPost and picked in Artnet for "11 Booths, I Could Hardly Tear Myself Away From at NADA New York". She also presented the video How to Undress in Front of Your Husband, a re-enactment of the 1937 original, at a solo show in SOHO20 Gallery and the Whitney Houston Biennale. HuffPost noted that the artwork featured a male narrator's patriarchal voice, paired with Marcin's absurdist performance. In the same year Marcin also participated with Zero Gravity in the Moscow International Biennale for Young Art, Deep Inside, curated by Nadim Samman, together with Marguerite Humeau, Julius von Bismarck, and Julian Charrière.

In 2017, Marcin went on a world tour world tour with her performance and media artwork OPHELIA, which received a grant from the Franklin Furnace Archive and was supported by a Kickstarter campaign.

OPHELIA was featured in a solo presentation at the Minnesota Street Project, highlighted in the San Francisco Chronicle by critic Charles Desmarais in the article "Ophelia Returns After 400 Years with New Message."

In 2019, SCHAUWERK Sindelfingen presented Marcin's first solo museum exhibition Ophelia, which was accompanied by the monograph Ophelia featuring contributions from Kathy Battista, Liam Gillick, and Susan Silas. The solo exhibition traveled to the Stadtgalerie Saarbrücken from 2019 to 2020.

In 2021, Marcin premiered her AI-based artwork #SOPHYGRAY at Kunstverein Ruhr in Essen. During her EMAP residency at Onassis Stegi in Athens, the work was launched as a public app available on the iOS App Store.

In 2023, the artwork #SOPHYGRAY received an Honorary Mention for the European Union Prize for Citizen Science by Ars Electronica in Linz and was exhibited at WRO 2023 | 20th Media Art Biennale in Wroclaw.

In 2024, #SOPHYGRAY was shown at alpha nova galerie futura as part of the Vorspiel of transmediale & CTM Festival in Berlin, IMPAKT Media Art Centre in Utrecht, and FORT Biennale_01 at Festung Franzensfeste in Fortezza.

== Themes ==
Best known for her media artworks #SOPHYGRAYand OPHELIA, Nadja Verena Marcin subverts historical and media representations of women, exposing the underlying systems of power and the psychological effects embedded in their creation. Addressing ecological and human rights concerns, Nadja Verena Marcin often employs an absurdist and surreal approach, repurposing relational imagery and source material from literature, history, philosophy, art, and pop culture. Her work creates thought-provoking encounters that highlight shifts in societal norms and reevaluate social constructs and dominant worldviews.

Writer and curator Kathy Battista mentions in Ophelia, "Marcin approaches feminism today as a concern of humanity and of the planet rather than of a specific gender. Using humor, topics from real life, and a dose of theatricality, the artist forces her viewers to think about how we hold women to impossible standards, how we set them up to fail, and how we must reconsider our treatment of more than half of the world's population."

Artist and critic Liam Gillick states in Ophelia "There is always a tension between her appearance in the role as the implicated "body" and a desire to expose and explain that adopted position. The persona is the moment where she experiences the physical tension of the idealized female form submerged in history and apparatus."

=== Curatorial Work ===
In 2015, Marcin curated "Seven Women, Seven Sins" at KUNSTRAUM, an exhibition featuring artists such as Emma Sulkowicz and Janine Antoni. In a review for ArtNet, Cait Munro remarked that the exhibition "aligns women's artwork with the so-called 'sins' they commit, allowing us to begin reclaiming the language and overcoming the judgments leveled against women since the Garden of Eden, the source of all human sin."

In 2016, Marcin co-curated "Video Shop" at the art fair NADA New York which Kari Adelaine described in HuffPost as "stood out in a manner of iconic, throw-back glory" and "a prescient way to open up a treasure trove of hidden, videographic potential" and won the Artspace Fairgoer Awards.

== Writing ==
Marcin occasionally contributes art criticism to Hyperallergic, including pieces like 150 Phalluses in Feminist Art Today, which reflects on the feminist art exhibition In the Cut – The Male Body in Feminist Art in Saarbrücken, where works by iconic female artists from the 1960s to 1980s evoke a sense of renewal and emphasize their impact on the fight for gender equality.

== Exhibitions ==
=== Solo Shows ===
2024 #SOPHYGRAY, alpha nova & galerie futura, Vorspiel at transmediale & ctm, Berlin

2023 #SOPHYGRAY, Onassis Foundation, Athens

2021/22 #SOPHYGRAY, Kunstverein Ruhr, Essen

2020/19 Ophelia, Stadtgalerie Saarbrücken

2019 Ophelia, SCHAUWERK Sindelfingen

2019 The Great Dictator, ZQM, Berlin

2018 OPHELIA, Minnesota Street Project, San Francisco

2018 OPHELIA, Moltkerei e.V. Werkstatt as part of DC Open, Cologne

2017 OPHELIA, CONTEXT Art Miami, 532 Gallery Thomas Jaeckel

2016 Cinema Pirata - How to Undress in Front of Your Husband, SOHO20 Gallery, Brooklyn

2015 01111010 (...), Esther Donatz Gallery as part of Kino der Kunst, Munich

2014 Zero Gravity, Kunstverein Unna, Unna

2013 Zero Gravity, 532 Gallery Thomas Jaeckel, New York

2012 Action Manual Vol I, Dortmunder Kunstverein, Dortmund

2012 Action Manual Vol II, Orangerie Schloss Rheda, Rheda-Wiedenbrück

=== Awards ===
2023 European Union Prize for Citizen Science Honorary Mention at Ars Electronica

2023 NEUSTARTPlus Arbeitsstipendium

2022 Individual Artist's Grant in Electronic Media & Film by New York Council on the Arts

2021/22 NEUSTART Modul C by BBK via the Federal German Culture Commissioner

2016 Franklin Furnace Grant, New York
