= Pablo Barba =

Chilean-born American Painter

- Born: Pablo Montealegre Barba; 1985 (age 40–41); Santiago, Chile
- Education: Columbia University (MFA, 2016) Universidad de Chile (MA, 2014) Pontificia Universidad Católica de Chile (BFA, 2009)
- Occupation: Painter
- Known for: Figurative oil paintings
- Movement: Contemporary art
- Website: pablobarba.com

Pablo Montealegre Barba (born 1985) is a Chilean-born American painter based in New York City. He is known for his vibrant, figurative oil paintings that blend traditions of historical genre painting with contemporary internet culture, stock photography, advertising, memes, and social media imagery.

== Early life and education ==
Pablo Montealegre Barba was born in 1985 in Santiago, Chile in the final years of Augusto Pinochet’s dictatorship and grew up during the rapid social and economic changes of Chile in the 1990s.

His grandparents and parents were architects. Barba has noted that while opportunities for painters were scarce—there was no notable museum collection or robust art market at the time—the environment was also liberating as he felt free to paint whatever he wanted without strong market pressures.

He earned a BFA from Universidad Católica de Chile (2009), an MA from Universidad de Chile (2014), and an MFA from Columbia University School of the Arts (2016), after moving to New York in 2014. During this period, he spent significant time at the Metropolitan Museum of Art which had a substantial influence on his work.

== Artistic style and themes ==
Barba makes allegorical paintings that depict contemporary lifestyle themes and digital-era behavior. His paintings often include small groups of figures in everyday scenarios, infused with absurdity and chaos, referencing historic petit genre or geselschapje. Critics have described his approach as blending humor, grotesquerie, and empathy.

Themes and series include office life (Business Casual), lifestyle influencers (LIVE, LAUGH, LOVE) and wellness culture (women laughing salad), genre painting and scenes of ordinary people from everyday life (Genre Paintings), and shopping, fashion, and luxury goods (Black Friday).

His 2025 exhibition Black Friday consisted of a series of large-scale paintings in the tradition of the grand genre. The show explored themes of originality and continuation of forms in the history of art and contemporary culture through scenes of shopping and luxury goods.

In 2026, in celebration of the 250th anniversary of the founding of the United States, Barba contributed a classical-style triptych to the U.S. Department of State Office of Art in Embassies exhibition at the Art Museum of the Americas. Each panel depicts an allegory of a civic virtue representing the colors of the American flag: red for valor, white for purity, and blue for justice.

== Career ==
Barba’s work has been exhibited in Chile and the United States. Institutional venues include the Art Museum of the Americas, the Bronx Museum of the Arts, the LeRoy Neiman Gallery, the Wallach Gallery at Columbia University, and the Fisher-Landau Center for Art. He has exhibited with galleries including A Hug From The Art World (New York) and Steve Turner (Los Angeles).

Notable solo exhibitions include:

- Business Casual (Steve Turner, Los Angeles, 2021)
- Live, Laugh, Love (A Hug From The Art World, New York, 2022)
- Genre Paintings (A Hug From The Art World, New York, 2023)
- Women Laughing Salad (A Hug From The Art World, East Hampton, 2024)
- Black Friday (A Hug From The Art World, New York, 2025)

His work has received coverage in The New York Times, T: The New York Times Style Magazine, Juxtapoz, Air Mail, Artsy, Cultured, and other publications. He lives and works in New York.
