= Marc Handelman =

American painter (born 1975)

Marc Handelman (born Santa Clara, California, 1975) is an American painter living and working in Brooklyn, New York. He studied at the Rhode Island School of Design (RISD) earning a BFA in Painting in 1998, with an Art History concentration. He spent two of those years at RISD at the European Honors Program, studying in Rome. In 2003, he was awarded an MFA in Visual Arts from Columbia University School of the Arts.

He is known for large scale paintings, landscapes and abstract images. Handelman's work has been shown internationally and has been featured in the USA Today exhibition at the Royal Academy in London. He has participated in exhibitions at several prominent commercial galleries such as Lombard-Freid Fine Arts, Elizabeth Dee Gallery in New York, and Marc Selwyn Fine Art in Los Angeles. He is represented by Sikkema Jenkins & Co. in New York.
