= Ilana Harris-Babou =

American artist

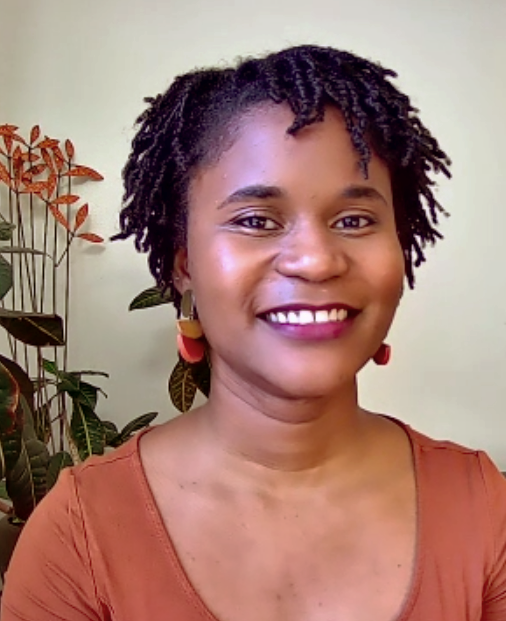
- Born: Ilana Yacine Harris-Babou; 1991 (age 34–35); Prospect Lefferts Gardens, Brooklyn, New York City, U.S.
- Education: Yale University; BA – 2013; Columbia University; MFA – 2016
- Website: ilanahb.com

Ilana Harris-Babou (born 1991) is an American sculptor and installation artist. Harris-Babou was born in Brooklyn, New York. Her upbringing was discussed in an interview on the Amy Beecher Show in August 2019. She is currently assistant professor of art and the Luther Gregg Sullivan Fellow in Art at Wesleyan University.

== Artistic practice ==
Harris-Babou often uses music videos, cooking shows, and home improvement television as material in her practice, often dissecting notions of the American Dream. Her practices engages ideas about intimacy, violence, and consumption. Harris-Babou speaks to her audience through humor and reconstructed consumer culture. She describes her work more in an interview with PIN-UP.

In 2018, she created a fake hardware store at the Larrie Gallery in New York City. This project, titled "Reparation Hardware", features reclaimed furniture to create sculptures that reflect the notion of making the old new again. Her work on "Reparation Hardware" critiques double standards and the modern American ideals of life within the home. She also features political messages reflecting the emancipation and equality of African-Americans in the United States.

Harris-Babou has exhibited throughout the US and Europe, with solo exhibitions at The Museum of Arts & Design in New York and Vox Populi Gallery in Philadelphia, Pennsylvania. She also exhibited at the de Young museum in San Francisco, Abrons Art Center in New York, the Zuckerman Museum of Art in Kennesaw, Georgia, Le Doc in Paris, France, the Jewish Museum in New York, & SculptureCenter in Long Island City.

Her most recent exhibition is titled "Decision Fatigue" and was featured at Hesse Flatow in New York City from February 20 to March 21, 2020. This exhibit features a video of Harris-Babou's mother, Sheila Harris conducting a makeup tutorial. The artist's mother reflects on her choices to appear youthful and healthy, questioning the reality of her youth. Harris-Babou uses this video to examine how structural problems are sometimes concealed as personal choices. The exhibit also features sculptures that are similar to items found in a boutique but altered to appear abnormal.

=== Selected exhibitions ===
- 2016 – In Response: Unorthodox – The Jewish Museum, New York City
- 2017 – One Bad Recipe – The Museum of Arts and Design, New York City
- 2018 – Reparation Hardware – Larrie, New York City
- 2018 – Further Thoughts on Earthly Materials – Kunsthaus Hamburg, Hamburg, Germany.
- 2019 – 2019 Whitney Biennial, curated by Rujeko Hockley and Jane Panetta.
- 2019 – Strange Loops– Artspace, New Haven, CT. Curated by Johannes DeYoung and Federico Solmi.
- 2020 – Decision Fatigue – Hesse Flatow, New York City.

== Awards ==
- 2017 Artist Community Engagement Grant, Rema Hort Mann Foundation, New York City
- 2017 Van Lier Fellow, Museum of Arts and Design, New York City
- 2018 Session, Recess Art, New York City
- 2020 National YoungArts Foundation's Jorge M. Pérez Award
