= Sarah Cole (writer) =

American writer and academic administrator

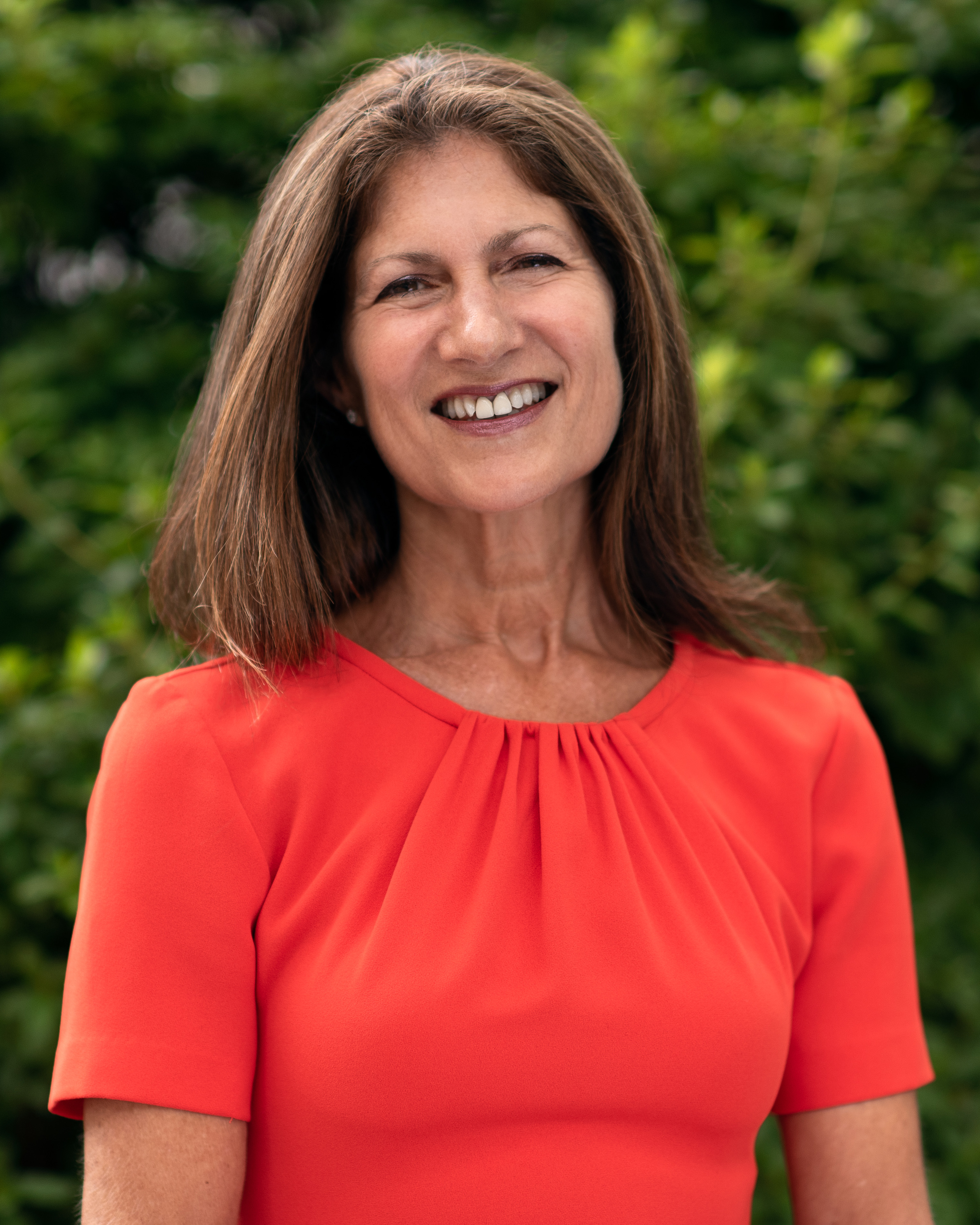
- Cole in 2024
- Occupations: Writer, Academic Administrator

Academic background
- Education: University of California, Berkeley; Williams College

Academic work
- Institutions: Columbia University

Sarah Cole is a U.S. writer and academic administrator specializing in British literature from the 19th and 20th centuries. She is the dean of Columbia University School of the Arts and Parr Professor of English and Comparative Literature. Cole served as Columbia University’s Dean of Humanities up to September 2023, during which time, she founded the Humanities War and Peace Initiative. She also spearheaded a scholarly and pedagogical initiative, Climate Humanities, in partnership with the Columbia Climate School.

A specialist in literary modernism, she is the co-founder of the area-wide NYNJ Modernism Seminar and serves on the board of several scholarly journals. She teaches courses in literary modernism and other topics in the 19th and 20th centuries, including the protest novel, war and violence, the body and sexuality, Irish literature, and author focused courses on Woolf, Eliot, Wells, Joyce, and others.

== Life ==
Cole was the recipient of a Guggenheim Fellowship. Her Ph.D. is from the University of California, Berkeley (1997) and her B.A. from Williams College (1989).

== Selected works ==
- Cole, Sarah (2003). Modernism, Male Friendship, and the First World War. Cambridge University Press. ISBN 978-0-521-81923-7.
- Cole, Sarah (2012). At the Violet Hour: Modernism and Violence in England and Ireland. OUP USA. ISBN 978-0-19-538961-6.
- Cole, Sarah (2020). Inventing Tomorrow: H.G. Wells and the Twentieth Century. Columbia University Press. ISBN 978-0-231-19312-2.
