= Emily Mae Smith =

American visual artist (born 1979)

- Education: University of Texas at Austin; Columbia University
- Known for: Painting and sculpture
- Movement: Surrealism

Emily Mae Smith (born 1979) is an American visual artist from Austin, Texas. Her sly, humorous, and riveting compositions nod to art historical movements such as Greek Mythology and Surrealism through with a distinctly 21st century spin. Her genre-defying paintings speak through a vocabulary of signs and symbols addressing timely subjects including gender, class, and violence. Smith’s paintings tackle art history’s phallocentric myths and create imagery for subjectivities absent in visual culture, specifically the feminist perspective.

== Biography ==
Smith was born in Austin, Texas in 1979. She now lives and works in Brooklyn, New York. Smith attended the University of Texas from 1997-2002, receiving a B.F.A. in Studio Art. Upon graduating in 2002, she was presented with the Roy Crane Award by the University of Texas. In 2005, Smith received the Edward Mazzella Jr. Scholarship from Columbia University. And in 2006, she received her M.F.A. in Visual Art from Columbia University.

Smith typically creates narrative oil paintings. In Patricia Hickson’s text about Emily Mae Smith’s exhibition at the Wadsworth Atheneum, she writes, “With a nod to distinct painting movements in the history of art, such as Symbolism, Surrealism, and Pop art, Emily Mae Smith creates lively compositions that offer sly social and political commentary.”

== Exhibitions ==
=== Solo exhibitions ===
- Petzel Gallery, New York (2022);
- Galerie Perrotin, Paris (2021);
- Rodolphe Janssen, Brussels, Belgium (2021);
- Simone Subal Gallery, New York, NY (2020, 2017);
- SCAD Museum of Art, Savannah, GA (2020);
- Marion Art Gallery, Rockefeller Arts Center, SUNY Fredonia, NY (2020);
- Galerie Perrotin, Tokyo (2019); Wadsworth Atheneum Museum of Art, Hartford, CT (2019);
- Le Consortium Museum, Dijon, France (2018);
- Contemporary Fine Arts, Berlin (2018);
- Galerie Perrotin (with Genesis Belanger), New York, NY (2018);
- SALTS (with Adam Henry), Basel, Switzerland (2017);
- Rodolphe Janssen, Brussels, Belgium (2016);
- Mary Mary, Glasgow, Scotland (2016);
- Laurel Gitlen, New York, NY (2015).

=== Selected group exhibitions ===
- The Hirshhorn Museum and Sculpture Garden, Washington, D.C. (2022);
- The Los Angeles County Museum of Art (LACMA), Los Angeles, CA (2022);
- 58th October Salon, Belgrade Biennale, Belgrade, Serbia (2021);
- Columbus Museum of Art, Columbus, OH (2021);
- Arsenal Contemporary, New York, NY (2021);
- Cleveland Institute of Art, Cleveland, OH (2020);
- Public Art Fund, New York, NY (2020);
- Petzel Gallery, New York, NY (2020);
- Hauser & Wirth, New York, NY (2019);
- Arsenal art contemporain, Montreal, Canada (2019);
- Gio Marconi, Milan, Italy (2019);
- Peter Freeman Inc., New York, NY (2018);
- Tanya Bonakdar Gallery, New York, NY (2018);
- Lumber Room, Portland, OR (2017);
- König Galerie, Berlin, Germany (2016);
- The Moore Building, Miami, FL (2015);
- Skirball Museum, Cincinnati, OH (2014).

== Public collections ==
- Arsenal art contemporain, Montreal, Canada
- Blanton Museum of Art, Austin, Texas
- Brooklyn Museum of Art, Brooklyn, New York
- Columbus Museum of Art, Columbus, Ohio
- Dallas Museum of Art, Dallas, Texas
- Hirshhorn Museum and Sculpture Garden, Washington, D.C.
- Le Consortium, Dijon, France
- Los Angeles County Museum of Art, Los Angeles, California
- Museum of Contemporary Art Los Angeles, Los Angeles, California
- Museum Brandhorst, Munich, Germany
- Powerlong Art Museum, Shanghai, China
- SCAD Museum of Art, Savannah, Georgia
- Wadsworth Atheneum Museum of Art, Hartford, Connecticut
- Whitney Museum of American Art, New York, New York
- Zuzeum Art Centre, Riga, Latvia

== Awards ==
- 1999-2001: University of Texas Department of Art Merit Awards
- 2002: Roy Crane Award, University of Texas
- 2005: Edward Mazella Jr. Scholarship, Columbia University
- 2018: New York Foundation for the Arts Fellowship in Painting
