= Liz Magic Laser =

American artist

- Born: 1981 (age 44–45); New York, U.S.
- Education: Wesleyan University, Columbia University
- Known for: Video art, Performance art

Liz Magic Laser (born 1981 in New York) is an American visual artist working primarily in video and performance. She is based art in Brooklyn, New York.

== Early life and education ==
She attended Wesleyan University and received her B.A. in 2003, and then in 2008 an M.F.A. from Columbia University. Laser also attended the Skowhegan School of Painting and Sculpture in 2008 and the Whitney Museum Independent Study Program (ISP) in 2009.

== Career ==
Her work has been presented at MoMA PS1, the Whitney Museum of American Art, and Performa 11, and she was a commissioned artist at the 2013 Armory Show. According to The New York Times, Laser's works focus on absurdities in political and financial institutions. She is known notably for her video, "The Thought Leader", which presents a script adapted from Fyodor Dostoyevsky's Notes from Underground performed by a child in the form of a mock TED Talk.

=== Exhibitions ===
Solo exhibitions of Laser's work have been presented at Derek Eller Gallery in 2010; Malmö Konsthall in 2012; DiverseWorks in 2013; the Westfälischer Kunstverein in 2013; Paula Cooper Gallery in 2013; Various Small Fires in 2015; Wilfried Lentz in 2015; Mercer Union in 2015; and Kunstverein Göttingen in 2016.

Her work has been included in MoMA PS1's Greater New York in 2010, Performa 11 in 2011, Pier 54, curated by Cecilia Alemani, in 2014, and the Frye Art Museum's Group Therapy in 2018.

=== Awards ===
Laser has received multiple awards and fellowships from various institutions, such as the Alfried Krupp von Bohlen und Halbach Foundation (2013), the Southern Exposure Offsite Graue Award (2013), the New York Foundation for the Arts fellowship (2012), and the Franklin Furnace Fund for Performance Art (2010).

== Personal life ==
Liz Magic Laser is married to artist Sanya Kantarovsky, together they live in Brooklyn and have one daughter.
