= Emily Fragos =

American poet

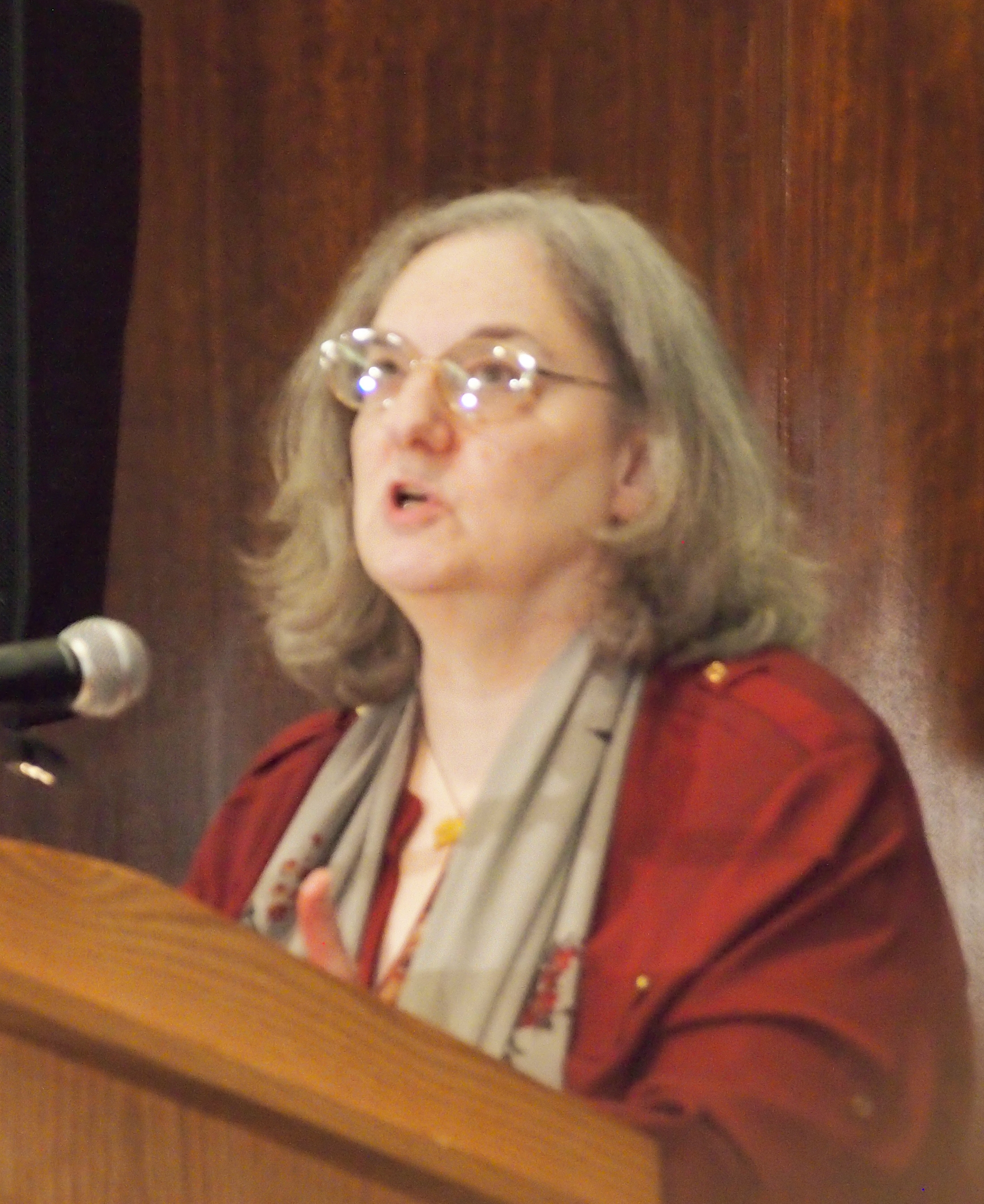
- Education: Syracuse University, Paris-Sorbonne University, Columbia University
- Writing career
- Genre: Poetry
- Notable awards: Witter Bynner Fellowship

Emily Fragos is an American poet. She was a Witter Bynner Fellow, and Guggenheim Fellow.

== Life ==
She graduated from Syracuse University, Paris-Sorbonne University, and Columbia University.

She is retired from teaching at New York University, and Columbia University.

Her work has appeared in Ploughshares, BOMB, Boston Review, The New Yorker, and Paris Review.

== Works ==
- Hostage, Sheep Meadow, 2011, ISBN 9781931357937
- Little Savage. Grove Press. 2004. ISBN 978-0-8021-4065-4.
