= Jane Zweibel =

American artist and art therapist

- Education: Pratt Institute; Columbia University; Bennington College
- Occupations: Painter, mixed media art, art therapy

Jane E. Zweibel is an American artist, and art therapist, she is known for her two dimensional paintings and mixed media work as well as three dimensional sculptures.

== Biography ==
Jane E. Zweibel was raised in New Rochelle, New York. Zweibel has a MPS degree (2009) in Art Therapy from Pratt Institute, MFA degree (1984) in Painting from Columbia University, and a BA degree (1981) in Visual Art from Bennington College.

Her artwork has a cartoon-like aesthetic and the themes include examining the female identity, the female form, self portraits, dreams, and mythology. She had a series of "stuffed paintings", which were three dimensional sculptures painted of women, self portraits, and mermaids.

Zweibel has held many exhibitions of her artwork nationally and internationally, including in galleries in New York City, Luxembourg (2010), New Zealand (2010), and the Philippines (2011). Zweibel's work is included in the Elizabeth A. Sackler Center for Feminist Art Archive at the Brooklyn Museum and in the Fales Library and Special Collections artist files from Artists Space (gallery) at New York University (NYU).
