= Hugh Hayden =

American sculptor (born 1983)

- Born: 1983 (age 42–43); Dallas, Texas, United States
- Education: Cornell University (BArch); Columbia University (MFA)
- Known for: Sculpture
- Website: hughhayden.com

Hugh Hayden (born 1983) is an American sculptor and former architect. Hayden is known for his wooden sculpture, often consisting of furniture or other domestic objects with large protruding spikes or tree branches.

Born and raised in Texas, Hayden first trained and worked as an architect in New York in the 2000s, designing spaces for corporate clients. In the early 2010s he began to focus more on his artistic practice, securing a studio and eventually attending graduate school for art.

Since refocusing on his art, Hayden has staged several solo exhibitions at galleries and museums across the United States and participated in a range of group exhibitions. The artist is based in New York City.

== Early life and education ==
Hugh Hayden was born in 1983, in Dallas, Texas. His father was a middle school mathematics teacher and his mother was a school counselor. He attended Dallas ISD schools for his primary education, where he was first exposed to art in the district's gifted education program. As a child he would visit the Dallas Museum of Art weekly. He went to high school at the Jesuit College Preparatory School of Dallas. Although he was uninterested in sports, he played football throughout high school to please his father.

Following high school, Hayden studied architecture at Cornell University, graduating with a BArch in 2007.

== Life and career ==
After graduating from Cornell, Hayden won second prize for a fellowship sponsored by Skidmore, Owings, & Merrill, eventually leading him to a full-time job under architect Adam Tihany in New York. He was laid off from his job in 2009 during the Great Recession. Hayden started focusing on making furniture after he lost his job and soon met Derrick Adams, whose career as a full-time artist convinced Hayden he could build an artistic career himself. He eventually found more full–time work as an in-house architect for several brands, including Alice + Olivia and Starbucks. In 2011, while working for Alice + Olivia, he secured a studio for the first time to make art thanks to a residency program from the Lower Manhattan Community Council.

While working full-time and making art in his spare time, Hayden saw that other young artists had already completed graduate degrees in art, so he decided to apply to and enroll at Columbia University in 2016. He earned an MFA in 2018 and worked as a teaching assistant for artist and professor Rirkrit Tiravanija while in school.

In 2018 he also mounted his first solo art exhibition at the nonprofit gallery White Columns in New York. After his first show at White Columns, Hayden staged Border States, a solo exhibition at New York's Lisson Gallery in September 2018. He presented a number of sculptures of domestic furniture and architectural elements hand-crafted from wood with various kinds of wooden spikes, thorns, and branches protruding from the objects. Hayden joined Lisson Gallery as a represented artist shortly after the opening of the exhibition.

Hayden was featured in The Shed's open call group exhibition in 2019, where he debuted Hedges, a large wooden house sculpture sprouting hundreds of full-length tree branches from its outer walls and roof.

In summer 2021, Hayden staged his second solo exhibition at Lisson Gallery in New York, titled Huey after his family's pet name for him. The show included several basketball hoop sculptures made with various types of woven rattan and vine - as well as one sculpture made with braids of synthetic Kanekalon hair fibers - which created hoops that were either flimsy, overly long, or otherwise impossible to use. Among other works, Hayden also installed a set of wooden church pews with sharp bright red brush bristles instead of fabric seats, rendering the pews unusable. Reviewing the show for The New York Times, critic Tausif Noor said the works in the show "are saturated with pointed critiques of prevailing American institutions", adding that "Hayden cinches his spot as a noteworthy figure in the lineage of American conceptualism."

In winter 2021, Hayden opened a solo show at the Institute of Contemporary Art, Miami titled Boogey Men.

Hayden was commissioned by the Madison Square Park Conservancy in New York to create an installation for the park in January 2022. His installation, Brier Patch, comprised 100 wooden school desks sculpted by Hayden, most of which were topped with full tree branches sprouting from each desk; a group of desks without branches was also installed for viewers to sit on. In a negative review of the installation for Hyperallergic, critic Erin L. Thompson said that siting the piece in Madison Square Park, in a wealthy area of Manhattan, "allows viewers to pat themselves on the back for their mere awareness of inequalities in our educational systems".

In May 2022, Hayden co-curated and participated in the public art group exhibition Black Atlantic in New York's Brooklyn Bridge Park, organized by the Public Art Fund. Hayden presented The Gulf Stream, a wooden rowboat with large human-like wooden ribs on its inside, installed on rocks by the water as if it had washed ashore. He said the title of the work was a reference to both Winslow Homer's painting of the same name from 1899 and Kerry James Marshall's similarly titled painting from 2003; the former painting features a black man struggling in a boat during a storm surrounded by sharks while the latter painting depicts a black family happily sailing. Hayden had originally been offered to show a solo installation but asked curator Daniel S. Palmer to expand the show to include other young artists of color, choosing Leilah Babirye, Dozie Kanu, Tau Lewis and Kiyan Williams to participate.

In spring 2023, Hayden participated in the group exhibition Emancipation at the Amon Carter Museum of American Art in Fort Worth, Texas, focused on artists' contemporary reactions to John Quincy Adams Ward's sculpture The Freedman from 1863 depicting a freed formerly enslaved black man. Hayden created a 3D–printed white plastic human–scale version of the original 19-inch (480 mm) sculpture, altered so that the figure was sitting in an Adirondack lawn chair and wearing a full set of modern clothing instead of the loincloth and broken chains from the original.

Hayden staged his first solo show in Los Angeles, Hughman, at Lisson Gallery in late 2023. He installed a series of bathroom stalls in the gallery that viewers could open to see sculptures inside, including male busts with guns for penises, urinals built for two simultaneous users, and toilets that open hidden glory holes. Lisson Gallery's space in Los Angeles where the show premiered was formerly a gay bathhouse. Other works in the show included wooden sculptures of skeletons and Pinocchio, along with Colonizer, a photograph of Hayden embracing his white male partner who is wearing a prosthetic pregnant stomach. Hayden restaged the show at Lisson Gallery's New York location in summer 2024, retitled as Hughmans. The exhibition in New York featured several new works including Harlem, a hanging rack of gold pots, pans, and musical instruments with faces embedded in them.

Hayden opened a solo exhibition in September 2024 at the Nasher Sculpture Center in his hometown of Dallas. Titled Homecoming, the show featured a range of sculptures exploring themes of school and childhood, including replicas of playground equipment with brush bristles stopping viewers from climbing, a wooden cafeteria table with spikes on its surface, and a row of metal lockers with a football uniform inside made from tree bark.

Also in September, Hayden opened Home Work, a ten-year survey exhibition at the Rose Art Museum at Brandeis University near Boston. The exhibition included works from throughout his career, including Brier Patch and Hedges. Hayden installed large infinity mirrors behind Hedges to multiply the house into an intimidating linear "hedge", receding into the distance in both directions. The show included High Cotton (2015-2020), an arcade-style claw machine featuring cotton bolls as prizes, referring to the back-breaking slave labor of picking cotton. Infinity mirrors were used to emphasize the unending tedium of the forced labor. Reviewing the show in The Boston Globe, critic Murray Whyte called Hayden "a virtuoso of meticulous craft and blunt intent".

Hayden participated in the Cooper Hewitt, Smithsonian Design Museum's triennial design exhibition Making Home in November 2024. He collaborated with opera singer Davóne Tines and director Zack Winokur to recreate a domestic space from the home Tines's grandparents lived in; the recreated room was built on a large platform with legs like a rocking chair that could be rocked mechanically.

In 2025, Hayden participated in the 16th Sharjah Biennial in the United Arab Emirates. As part of the biennial, Hayden installed Brier Patch in the desert in Al Madam Buried Village, placed in a location where the desks would eventually be covered in sand with the branches protruding above.

== Notable works in public collections ==
- America (2018), Princeton University Art Museum, Princeton, New Jersey
- Invisible Man (2019), Smart Museum of Art, Chicago
- To Be Titled 2 (2020), Princeton University Art Museum, Princeton, New Jersey
- America (2021), Institute of Contemporary Art, Miami
- Daddy Says (2021), Dallas Museum of Art
- Fee-Fi-Fo-Fum (2021), Whitney Museum, New York
- NIMBY (2021), Whitney Museum, New York
- Chosen (2023), Metropolitan Museum of Art, New York
- American Gothic (2024), Des Moines Art Center, Des Moines, Iowa
- The End (2025), Clark Art Institute, Williamstown, Massachusetts

== Publications ==
- Hayden, Hugh (October 16, 2018). "One Piece: America". BOMB. OCLC 61313615.
