= Groombridge (disambiguation) =

Groombridge is a village in England.

Groombridge may also refer to:

== People ==
- Groombridge (Essex cricketer) (fl. 1793)
- Kate Groombridge (born 1980), British fashion model and actress
- Stephen Groombridge (1755–1832), British merchant and astronomer
- William Groombridge (disambiguation)

== Other uses ==
- 5657 Groombridge, an asteroid
- Groombridge 34, a binary system
- Groombridge 1618, a star
