= Sagrona Teema =

- Andor episode
- Cassian Andor (Diego Luna) flies away from the jungle moon on which he has been trapped over the previous two episodes, now revealed as Yavin 4, the eventual location of the Rebel Alliance base.
- Episode no.: Season 2 Episode 2
- Directed by: Ariel Kleiman
- Written by: Tony Gilroy
- Cinematography by: Christophe Nuyens
- Editing by: Craig Ferreira
- Original release date: April 22, 2025
- Running time: 44 minutes

Guest appearances
- Sam Gilroy as Gerdis; Benjamin Norris as Bardi; Anton Lesser as Major Partagaz; Alastair Mackenzie as Perrin Fertha; Alison Pargeter as Aneth; Joplin Sibtain as Brasso; Muhannad Bhaier as Wilmon Paak; Alex Waldmann as Lieutenant Krole; Richard Dillane as Davo Sculdun; Bronte Carmichael as Leida Mothma; Finley Glasgow as Stekan Sculdun; Rosalind Halstead as Runai Sculdun; Pierro Niel-Mee as Erskin Semaj; Ben Miles as Tay Kolma; Dave Chapman as B2EMO (voice)

Episode chronology
← Previous "One Year Later"	Next → "Harvest"

"Sagrona Teema" is the second episode of the second season of the American science fiction political spy thriller drama television series Andor. It is the fourteenth episode of the series overall; it was written by series creator Tony Gilroy and directed by Ariel Kleiman.

"Sagrona Teema" was released on Disney+ on April 22, 2025, as part of a three-episode block also including "One Year Later" and "Harvest", and received generally positive reviews from critics.

== Plot ==
On the jungle moon, the Maya Pei Brigade splits into two territorial factions at an armed stalemate, with one side taking Cassian Andor prisoner in their ship, and the other attempting to commandeer Cassian's stolen TIE Avenger.

On Coruscant, Dedra Meero tells Partagaz she does not want the Ghorman project, as she prefers to continue chasing down "Axis", but Partagaz points out that she has spent two years on Axis with little to show for it. He assures Dedra that Ghorman, while appearing to be a demotion in the near term, will ultimately benefit her career heavily. Syril Karn, meanwhile, has been promoted to a senior role at the Imperial Bureau of Standards, and he and Dedra are now living together as a couple. The two prepare for a social event at their home the following day.

At the wedding on Chandrila, Kleya Marki tells Luthen Rael she has been unable to reach Bix Caleen on Mina-Rau; they deduce the Empire has shut off communications to and from the planet ahead of an inspection. Indeed, Imperial officers arrive on Mina-Rau to survey the farms; Bix and the others opt not to try to escape the farm where they are illegally staying, so as to not arouse suspicion. An imperial lieutenant named Krole suggestively approaches an uncomfortable Bix, who lies about having a husband; Krole leaves after Brasso arrives.

At the wedding, Tay tells Mon Mothma that rebel activity has hurt his investments and that he feels "undervalued". Mon surreptitiously discusses the possibility of Tay's defection with Luthen, who says they should attempt to ascertain Tay's price for keeping silent about the Rebellion. Mon's husband Perrin Fertha gives a heartfelt toast to Leida and Stekan; Kleya returns to the antiques shop on Coruscant in an attempt to make contact with the missing Cassian.

On the jungle moon, the two factions attempt to parley, only to be attacked by wild animals native to the moon. Cassian uses the opportunity to escape in the stolen TIE Avenger, and the jungle moon is revealed to be Yavin 4.

== Production ==
=== Development ===
The episode was written by series creator Tony Gilroy, in his seventh writing credit for the show, and directed by Ariel Kleiman, who would go on to also direct the next four episodes of the series. The episodes of Andor's second season, like those of its first, are split up into blocks, or story arcs, of three episodes; however, unlike in season one, each arc begins with a time skip of one year from the previous episode. Gilroy decided to structure the season this way after concluding that the original five-season plan for the show was unfeasible, and needing some way to bridge the four years between season 1 and Rogue One (2016) in a single season. As proof of concept, he wrote the first and last episodes of each would-be arc, and eventually decided on this structure for the season.

=== Writing ===
"Sagrona Teema" marks the mid-point of the first three-episode block of the season, and was the last arc to be written. Gilroy finished the script for the third episode on a flight days before the start of the 2023 Writers Guild of America strike. The planet Mina-Rau was named after the daughter of Tom Bissell, another writer for the season, who penned episodes 10–12.

=== Casting ===
Diego Luna, Stellan Skarsgård, Genevieve O'Reilly, Adria Arjona, Denise Gough, Faye Marsay, Elizabeth Dulau, Anton Lesser, Joplin Sibtain, Ben Miles, Muhannad Bhaier, Alastair Mackenzie and Richard Dillane all reprise their roles from the first season. The roles of Bardi and Gerdis are played by Benjamin Norris and Sam Gilroy, the son of series creator Tony Gilroy, respectively. The two were cast by Gilroy himself after he observed their rowdy behavior at a family gathering and thought they would serve as good fits for the roles of the squabbling Maya Pei rebels. Pierro Niel-Mee joins the series' ensemble as Erskin Semaj, a character originally seen in Star Wars Rebels (2014–2018) who serves as an aide to Mon.

=== Filming ===
"Sagrona Teema" was filmed in the United Kingdom, similar to the majority of the series. The first block of the season was the last to be filmed, and faced some disruptions due to the 2023 Hollywood labor disputes, specifically in the Central England Midlands, where the crew had planted 200 acres of rye for the scenes on Mina-Rau. Filming for the Chandrila mountains took place at the Montserrat mountain range.

=== Music ===
The original score for "Sagrona Teema", as with nine other episodes of the season's twelve, (Note: All episodes of season 2 but "Ever Been to Ghorman?" and "I Have Friends Everywhere" credit Roberts as the main composer) was composed by Brandon Roberts, replacing Nicholas Britell, the composer for the show's first season, due to scheduling conflicts.

The soundtrack for the episode was released alongside that of the other two episodes in its block on April 25, 2025, via Walt Disney Records as part of the first of four volumes of the second season's original score.

Andor Season 2: Episode 2 (Original Soundtrack)
No.	Title	Length
1.	"There's Nothing Out Here!"	2:40
2.	"Jungle Escalation"	1:22
3.	"The Challenge"	1:54
4.	"Five Hands"	3:38
5.	"He's Getting Away!"	1:33
Total length:		11:05

== Release ==
"Sagrona Teema" was released on Disney+ on April 22, 2025, as part of a three-episode block, alongside "One Year Later" and "Harvest". The episode was expected to be released in August 2024, but it was delayed due to the 2023 Hollywood labor disputes.

== Reception ==
=== Critical response ===
The review aggregator website Rotten Tomatoes reports an 86% approval rating, based on 7 reviews.

William Hughes of The A.V. Club gave a positive review, writing "many of the individual moments are riveting, the performances almost uniformly excellent." Mike Redmond of Pajiba also gave a positive review, summarizing that "My major concern was that each episode would be too dense to digest so quickly, but so far, they have flowed effortlessly into each other. I didn't want them to stop".
