= Harvest (Andor) =

- Andor episode
- On the final day of her daughter Leida's wedding, Mon Mothma (Genevieve O'Reilly) looks on in despair after Luthen Rael (Stellan Skarsgård) informs her that he has arranged the murder of her childhood friend Tay Kolma (Ben Miles).
- Episode no.: Season 2 Episode 3
- Directed by: Ariel Kleiman
- Written by: Tony Gilroy
- Cinematography by: Christophe Nuyens
- Editing by: John Gilroy
- Original release date: April 22, 2025
- Running time: 53 minutes

Guest appearances
- Dave Chapman as B2EMO (voice); Joplin Sibtain as Brasso; Muhannad Bhaier as Wilmon Paak; Bronte Carmichael as Leida Mothma; Richard Dillane as Davo Sculdun; Rosalind Halstead as Runai Sculdun; Finley Glasgow as Stekan Sculdun; Alastair Mackenzie as Perrin Fertha; Kathryn Hunter as Eedy Karn; Pierro Niel-Mee as Erskin Semaj; Ben Miles as Tay Kolma; Alex Waldmann as Lieutenant Krole

Episode chronology
← Previous "Sagrona Teema"	Next → "Ever Been to Ghorman?"

"Harvest" is the third episode of the second season of the American science fiction political spy thriller drama television series Andor. It is the fifteenth episode of the series overall; it was written by series creator Tony Gilroy and directed by Ariel Kleiman.

"Harvest" was released on Disney+ on April 22, 2025 as part of a three-episode block also including "One Year Later" and "Sagrona Teema", and received generally favorable reviews from critics.

== Plot ==
Aboard the TIE Avenger, Cassian Andor finally makes contact with Kleya Marki, ascertaining that his friends on Mina-Rau are in danger.

On Mina-Rau, the local farmer hosting the Ferrix refugees warns that the Empire will be inspecting their district very soon, and that they recently arrested another group of undocumented migrants. The group makes plans to leave the farm before the Imperial inspectors arrive.

On the day of Leida's wedding in Chandrila, Mon Mothma recounts her own wedding day to her daughter and assures her that she need not go through with the marriage if she does not want to, but Leida shuts her down. Leida's wedding ceremony to Stekan Sculdun goes as planned, and the guests prepare for the reception afterwards.

On Coruscant, Syril Karn and Dedra Meero host the former's overbearing mother Eedy for dinner. Eedy repeatedly belittles Syril, who excuses himself from the table; while he is gone, Dedra immediately cows Eedy, guaranteeing her a level of contact with Syril "inversely proportional to the anxiety she generates in their lives", while obliquely threatening Eedy's brother Harlo with an ISB criminal prosecution. Syril returns to the table where Eedy is much more amiable.

At the lavish wedding reception on Chandrila, Mon assures Tay that they will discuss his financial troubles next week. However, Luthen Rael reasons that no price they pay for Tay's silence will ever be enough, and implies to a horrified Mon that Tay must be killed to avoid becoming a bigger liability.

On Mina-Rau, an Imperial patrol led by Lieutenant Krole arrives on the farm where the Ferrix refugees are staying. Bix Caleen is alone when Krole arrives, as Wilmon has gone to bid farewell to his girlfriend on a nearby farm, and Brasso is detained by Stormtroopers while searching for Wilmon. Krole tells Bix he knows she is on the planet illegally, and offers to help "fix" her immigration status in exchange for sexual favors. When Bix refuses, Krole attempts to force himself on her, leading to a brutal fight that ends with Bix fatally striking him in the head. Wilmon arrives soon after and fires at the soldier guarding Bix's cabin, enabling Bix to kill him as well. Upon receiving news of the scuffle, Imperial soldiers waiting with Brasso rush to Bix's cabin.

Cassian Andor, meanwhile, races to Mina-Rau in the TIE Avenger and opens fire on the Imperial soldiers, destroying their transport and killing them all. Brasso uses the distraction to attempt escaping by speeder, but is shot dead by pursuing Stormtroopers, as Cassian arrives too late to save him. Bix and Wilmon reunite with Cassian, and they flee the planet.

On Chandrila, Vel Sartha watches Tay get taken away by Cinta Kaz, to whom Vel has not spoken in a year. Mon, distressed at having consented to Tay's death, numbs herself with alcohol and dances drunkenly with the other party guests.

== Production ==
=== Development ===
The episode was written by series creator Tony Gilroy, in his eighth writing credit for the show, and directed by Ariel Kleiman, who would go on to also direct the next three episodes of the series. The episodes of Andor's second season, like those of its first, are split up into blocks, or story arcs, of three episodes; however, unlike in season one, each arc begins with a time skip of one year from the previous episode. Gilroy decided to structure the season this way after concluding that the original five-season plan for the show was unfeasible, and needing some way to bridge the four years between season 1 and Rogue One (2016) in a single season. As proof of concept, he wrote the first and last episodes of each would-be arc, and eventually decided on this structure for the season.

=== Writing ===
"Harvest" marks the end of the first three-episode block of the season, and was the last arc to be written. Gilroy finished the script for the episode on a flight days before the start of the 2023 Writers Guild of America strike. The planet Mina-Rau was named after the daughter of Tom Bissell, another writer for the season, who penned episodes 10 through 12.

=== Casting ===
Diego Luna, Stellan Skarsgård, Genevieve O'Reilly, Adria Arjona, Denise Gough, Faye Marsay, Elizabeth Dulau, Joplin Sibtain, Muhannad Bhaier, Alastair Mackenzie and Richard Dillane all reprise their roles from the first season. Pierro Niel-Mee joins the series' ensemble as Erskin Semaj, a character originally seen in Star Wars Rebels (2014–2018) who serves as an aide to Mon.

=== Filming ===
"Harvest" was filmed in the United Kingdom, similar to the majority of the series. The first block of the season was the last to be filmed, and faced some disruptions due to the 2023 Hollywood labor disputes, specifically in the Central England Midlands, where the crew had planted 200 acres of rye for the scenes on Mina-Rau.

=== Music ===
The original score for "Harvest", as with nine other episodes of the season's twelve, (Note: All episodes of season 2 but "Ever Been to Ghorman?" and "I Have Friends Everywhere" credit Roberts as the main composer) was composed by Brandon Roberts, replacing Nicholas Britell, the composer for the show's first season, due to scheduling conflicts.

The soundtrack for the episode was released alongside that of the other two episodes in its block on April 25, 2025 via Walt Disney Records as part of the first of four volumes of the second season's original score. An EDM remix of "Niamos!", a piece composed by Nicholas Britell for the first season, is featured in Mon Mothma's "now iconic drunk dance scene" at the end of the episode. The song "Brasso" from the season 2 score contains portions of the remix used in the episode; Disney subsequently released a full version of the track — titled "NIAMOS! (Chandrilian Club Mix)" — for purchase and streaming.

Andor Season 2: Episode 3 (Original Soundtrack)
No.	Title	Length
1.	"Andor (Main Title Theme)"	0:52
2.	"The Veil & the Braid"	2:59
3.	"Host & Hostess"	1:11
4.	"Inversely Proportional"	1:46
5.	"Tay Is Leaving Early"	1:26
6.	"Where's Wilmon?"	2:06
7.	"Mina Run"	2:41
8.	"Harvest Avenger"	2:22
9.	"Brasso"	2:57
10.	"Andor Onward"	2:12
Total length:		20:32

==== Source music released separately from the soundtrack ====
Title	Performer(s)	Length
"NIAMOS! (Chandrilian Club Mix)"	Nicholas Britell, Brandon Roberts	4:15

== Release ==
"Harvest" was released on Disney+ on April 22, 2025, as part of a three-episode block, alongside "One Year Later" and "Sagrona Teema". The episode was expected to be released in August 2024, but it was delayed due to the 2023 Hollywood labor disputes.

== Reception ==
=== Critical response ===
The review aggregator website Rotten Tomatoes reports a 100% approval rating, based on 8 reviews.

William Hughes of The A.V. Club gave a positive review, writing "excellent, irresistible hour of TV." Mike Redmond of Pajiba also gave a positive review, summarizing that "I deprived myself of the joy of barreling right into the gut punch of a third episode. Bad move on that alone".

The attempted rape of Bix Caleen by Imperial Lieutenant Krole in the episode attracted a mixed reception from some viewers and fans. Other fans defended the scene for highlighting the plight of undocumented migrants, the evil of fascist regimes or compared it to the Princess Leia "slave bikini" costume in Return of the Jedi (1983). During an interview with The Hollywood Reporter, showrunner Gilroy defended the scene, arguing that shying from sexual assault was not authentic for a war story. He said: "I mean, let's be honest, man: The history of civilization, there's a huge arterial component of it that's rape. All of us who are here — we are all the product of rape. I mean armies and power throughout history [have committed rape]. So to not touch on it, in some way … It just was organic and it felt right, coming about as a power trip for this guy. I was really trying to make a path for Bix that would ultimately lead to clarity — but a difficult path to get back to clarity". Actress Adria Arjona, who plays Bix, also defended the scene, stating: "The fact that I get to speak [the word "rape"] out [loud] — I felt so much power in that. I felt it throughout the day. I felt it when I finished filming, and I went home". Arjona worked with director Ariel Kleiman to craft the scene's choreography, providing input on how Bix would fight back against her attacker.

=== Accolades ===
Award	Year	Category	Recipient(s)	Result	Ref.
Costume Designers Guild Awards	2026	Excellence in Sci-Fi/Fantasy Television	Michael Wilkinson	Won	
Creative Arts Emmy Awards	2025	Outstanding Cinematography for a Series (One Hour)	Christophe Nuyens	Nominated	
Creative Arts Emmy Awards	2025	Outstanding Fantasy/Sci-Fi Costumes	Michael Wilkinson, Kate O'Farrell, Richard Davies, and Paula Fajardo	Won	
