= Kalkite =

Kalkite may refer to:

- Kalkite, New South Wales, a locality in Snowy Monaro Regional Council, Australia
- Kalkite, a fictional rare mineral on Ghorman, a Star Wars planet
  - in the episode "One Year Later" of the American science fiction TV series Andor
