= CAMC =

CAMC may refer to:

- Charleston Area Medical Center, a complex of hospitals in Charleston, West Virginia
- Carlsberg Meridian Telescope, formerly known as the Carlsberg Automatic Meridian Circle
- Computer-Aided Manufacturing Capability
- Committee on the American Mathematics Competitions, the organization that oversees the American Mathematics Competitions
- A brand name of Chinese truck manufacturer Hualing Xingma
