= Meridian circle =

Astronomical instrument for timing of the passage of stars

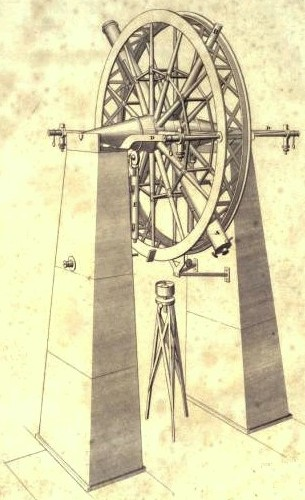
Groombridge transit circle of 1806

The meridian circle is an instrument for timing of the passage of stars across the local meridian, an event known as a culmination, while at the same time measuring their angular distance from the nadir. These are special purpose telescopes mounted so as to allow pointing only in the meridian, the great circle through the north point of the horizon, the north celestial pole, the zenith, the south point of the horizon, the south celestial pole, and the nadir. Meridian telescopes rely on the rotation of the sky to bring objects into their field of view and are mounted on a fixed, horizontal, east–west axis.

The similar transit instrument, transit circle, or transit telescope is likewise mounted on a horizontal axis, but the axis need not be fixed in the east–west direction. For instance, a surveyor's theodolite can function as a transit instrument if its telescope is capable of a full revolution about the horizontal axis. Meridian circles are often called by these names, although they are less specific.

For many years, transit timings were the most accurate method of measuring the positions of heavenly bodies, and meridian instruments were relied upon to perform this painstaking work. Before spectroscopy, photography, and the perfection of reflecting telescopes, the measuring of positions (and the deriving of orbits and astronomical constants) was the major work of observatories.

== Importance ==
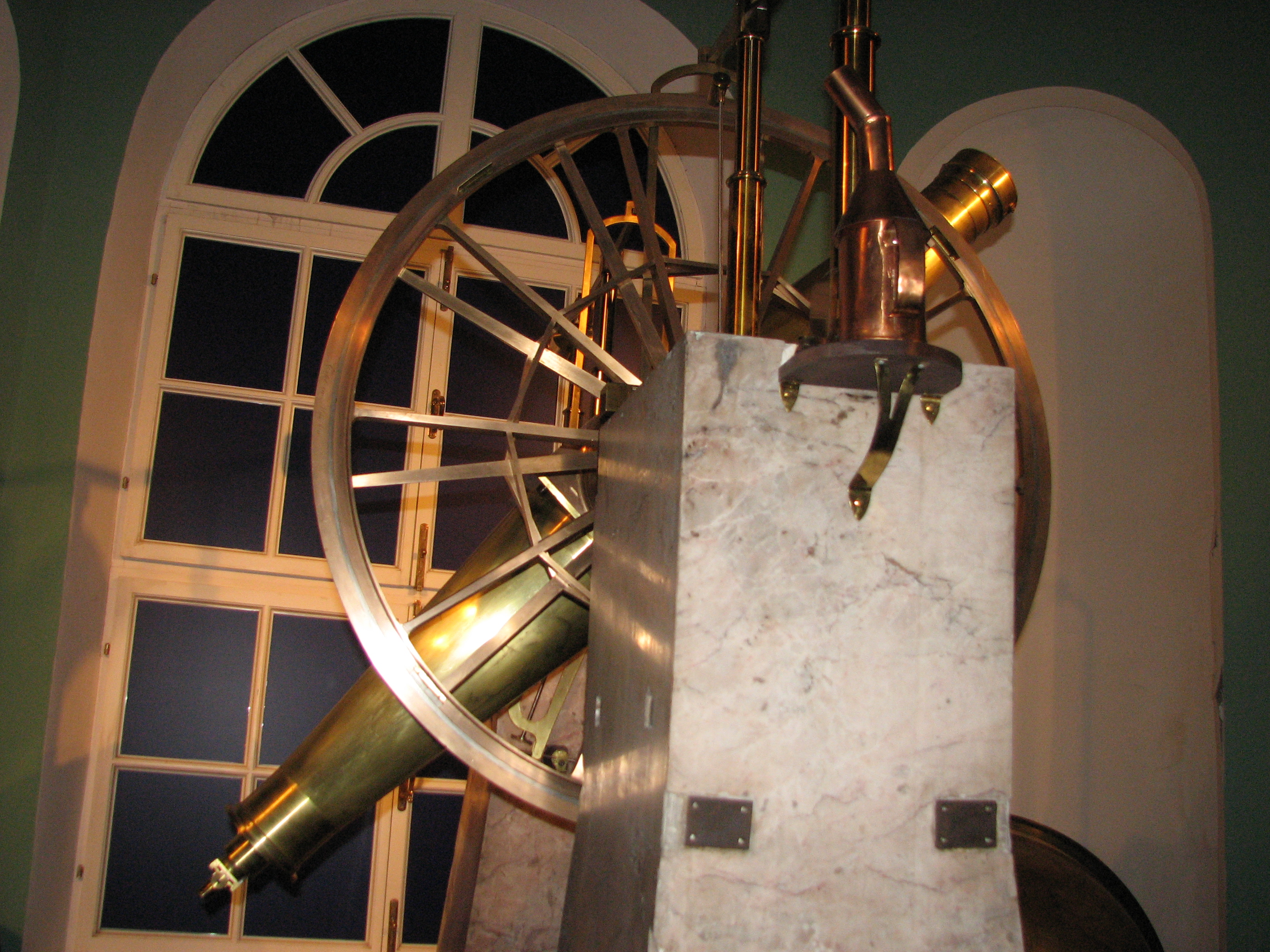
Meridian circle at Saint Petersburg Kunstkamera, built by T.L. Ertel, Germany, 1828

Fixing a telescope to move only in the meridian has advantages in the high-precision work for which these instruments are employed:

- The very simple mounting is easier to manufacture and maintain to a high precision.
- At most locations on the Earth, the meridian is the only plane in which celestial coordinates can be indexed directly with such a simple mounting; the equatorial coordinate system aligns naturally with the meridian at all times. Revolving the telescope about its axis moves it directly in declination, and objects move through its field of view in right ascension.
- All objects in the sky are subject to the distortion of atmospheric refraction, which tends to make objects appear slightly higher in the sky than they actually are. At the meridian, this distortion is in declination only, and is easily accounted for; elsewhere in the sky, refraction causes a complex distortion in coordinates which is more difficult to reduce. Such complex analysis is not conducive to high precision.

== Basic instrument ==
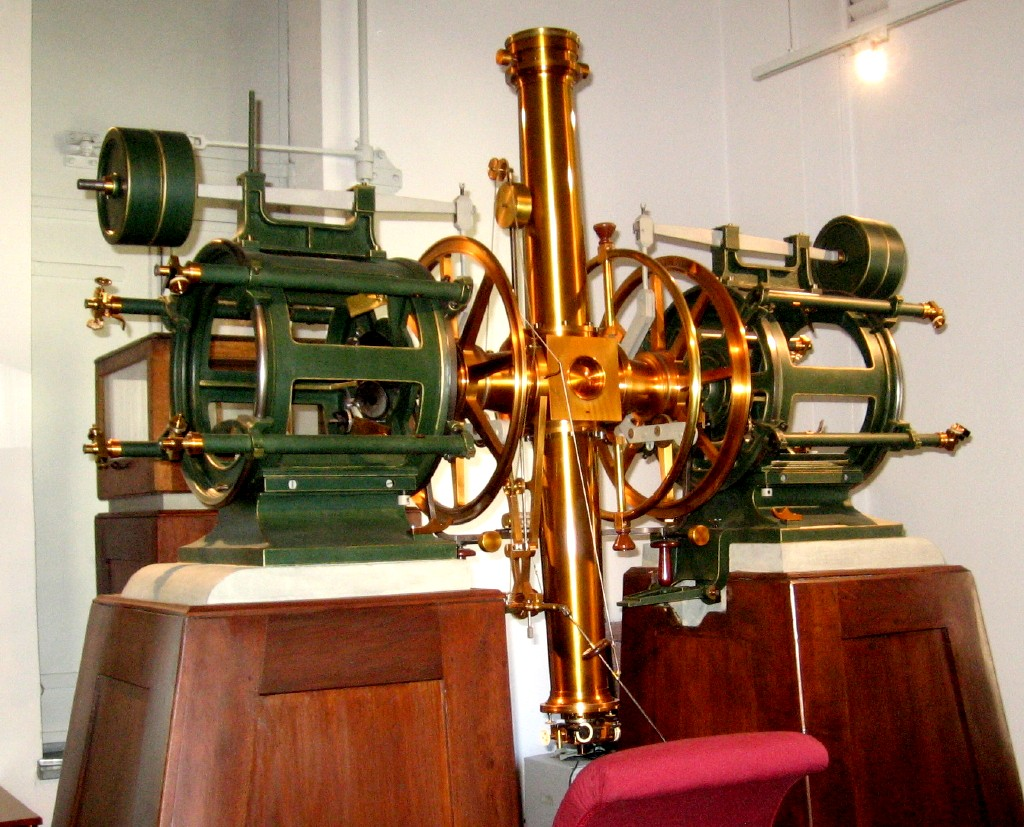
Meridian circle at the Kuffner observatory, Vienna, Austria, built by Repsold & Sons, Hamburg, 1886. Note the counterweights, the short, green cylindrical objects at the outer top of the mechanism, and the four long, thin, microscopes for reading the circles.

The state of the art of meridian instruments of the late 19th and early 20th century is described here, giving some idea of the precise methods of construction, operation and adjustment employed.

=== Construction ===
The earliest transit telescope was not placed in the middle of the axis, but nearer to one end, to prevent the axis from bending under the weight of the telescope. Later, it was usually placed in the centre of the axis, which consisted of one piece of brass or gun metal with turned cylindrical steel pivots at each end. Several instruments were made entirely of steel, which was much more rigid than brass. The pivots rested on V-shaped bearings, either set into massive stone or brick piers which supported the instrument, or attached to metal frameworks on the tops of the piers. The temperature of the instrument and local atmosphere were monitored by thermometers. The piers were usually separate from the foundation of the building, to prevent transmission of vibration from the building to the telescope. To relieve the pivots from the weight of the instrument, which would have distorted their shape and caused rapid wear, each end of the axis was supported by a hook or yoke with friction rollers, suspended from a lever supported by the pier, counterbalanced so as to leave only a small fraction of the weight on the precision V-shaped bearings. In some cases, the counterweight pushed up on the roller bearings from below. The bearings were set nearly in a true east–west line, but fine adjustment was possible by horizontal and vertical screws. A spirit level was used to monitor for any inclination of the axis to the horizon. Eccentricity (an off-center condition) or other irregularities of the pivots of the telescope's axis were accounted for, in some cases, by providing another telescope through the axis itself. By observing the motion of an artificial star, located east or west of the center of the main instrument, and seen through this axis telescope and a small collimating telescope, as the main telescope was rotated, the shape of the pivots, and any wobble of the axis, could be determined.

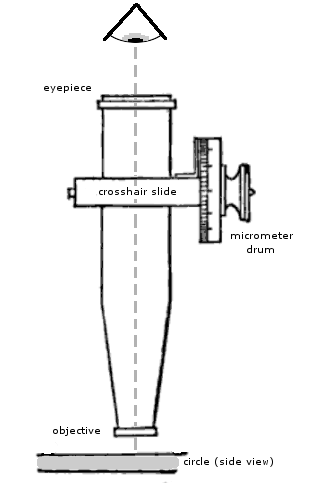
Top view of a circle-reading microscope; from Norton (1867).

Near each end of the axis, attached to the axis and turning with it, was a circle or wheel for measuring the angle of the telescope to the zenith or horizon. Generally of 1 to 3 feet or more in diameter, it was divided to 2 or 5 arcminutes, on a slip of silver set into the face of the circle near the circumference. These graduations were read by microscopes, generally four for each circle, mounted to the piers or a framework surrounding the axis, at 90° intervals around the circles. By averaging the four readings the eccentricity (from inaccurate centering of the circles) and the errors of graduation were greatly reduced. Each microscope was furnished with a micrometer screw, which moved crosshairs, with which the distance of the circle graduations from the centre of the field of view could be measured. The drum of the screw was divided to measure single seconds of arc (0.1" being estimated), while the number of revolutions were counted by a comb like scale in the field of view. The microscopes were given such magnification and placed at such a distance from the circle that one revolution of the micrometer screw corresponded to 1 arcminute (1') on the circle. The error was determined occasionally by measuring standard intervals of 2' or 5' on the circle. The periodic errors of the screw were accounted for. On some instruments, one of the circles was graduated and read more coarsely than the other, and was used only in finding the target stars.

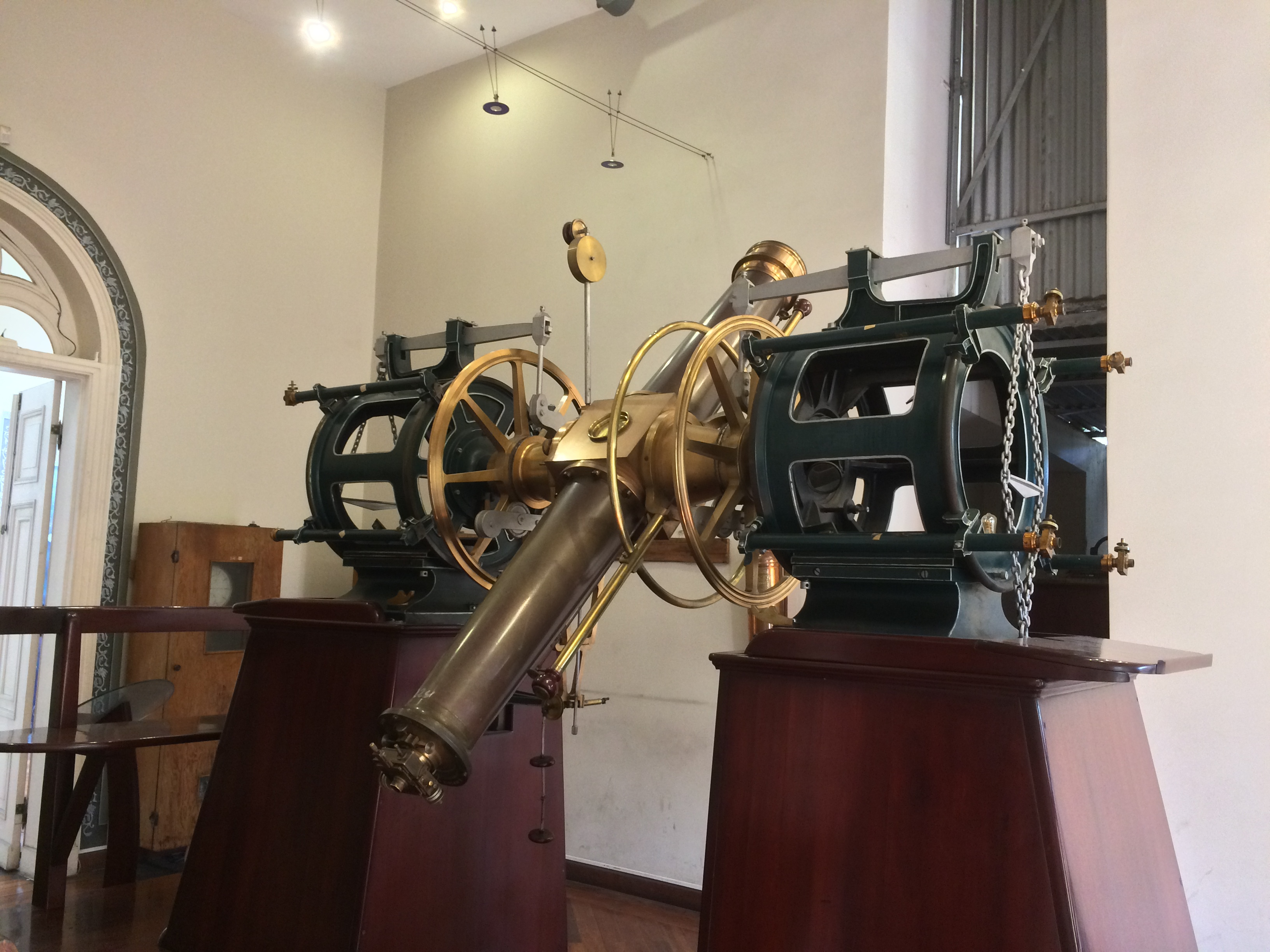
Meridian circle at the Quito Astronomical Observatory. Built by Repsold & Sons, Hamburg, 1889.

The telescope consisted of two tubes screwed to the central cube of the axis. The tubes were usually conical and as stiff as possible to help prevent flexure. The connection to the axis was also as firm as possible, as flexure of the tube would affect declinations deduced from observations. The flexure in the horizontal position of the tube was determined by two collimators—telescopes placed horizontally in the meridian, north and south of the transit circle, with their objective lenses towards it. These were pointed at one another (through holes in the tube of the telescope, or by removing the telescope from its mount) so that the crosshairs in their foci coincided. The collimators were often permanently mounted in these positions, with their objectives and eyepieces fixed to separate piers. The meridian telescope was pointed to one collimator and then the other, moving through exactly 180°, and by reading the circle the amount of flexure (the amount the readings differed from 180°) was found. Absolute flexure, that is, a fixed bend in the tube, was detected by arranging that eyepiece and objective lens could be interchanged, and the average of the two observations of the same star was free from this error.

Parts of the apparatus, including the circles, pivots and bearings, were sometimes enclosed in glass cases to protect them from dust. These cases had openings for access. The reading microscopes then extended into the glass cases, while their eyepiece ends and micrometers were protected from dust by removable silk covers.

Certain instrumental errors could be averaged out by reversing the telescope on its mounting. A carriage was provided, which ran on rails between the piers, and on which the axis, circles and telescope could be raised by a screw-jack, wheeled out from between the piers, turned 180°, wheeled back, and lowered again.

The observing building housing the meridian circle did not have a rotating dome, as is often seen at observatories. Since the telescope observed only in the meridian, a vertical slot in the north and south walls, and across the roof between these, was all that was necessary. The building was unheated and kept as much as possible at the temperature of the outside air, to avoid air currents which would disturb the telescopic view. The building also housed the clocks, recorders, and other equipment for making observations.

=== Operation ===
At the focal plane, the eye end of the telescope had a number of vertical and one or two horizontal wires (crosshairs). In observing stars, the telescope was first directed downward at a basin of mercury forming a perfectly horizontal mirror and reflecting an image of the crosshairs back up the telescope tube. The crosshairs were adjusted until coincident with their reflection, and the line of sight was then perfectly vertical; in this position the circles were read for the nadir point.

The telescope was next brought up to the approximate declination of the target star by watching the finder circle. The instrument was provided with a clamping apparatus, by which the observer, after having set the approximate declination, could clamp the axis so the telescope could not be moved in declination, except very slowly by a fine screw. By this slow motion, the telescope was adjusted until the star moved along the horizontal wire (or if there were two, in the middle between them), from the east side of the field of view to the west. Following this, the circles were read by the microscopes for a measurement of the apparent altitude of the star. The difference between this measurement and the nadir point was the nadir distance of the star. A movable horizontal wire or declination-micrometer was also used.

Another method of observing the apparent altitude of a star was to take half of the angular distance between the star observed directly and its reflection observed in a basin of mercury. The average of these two readings was the reading when the line of sight was horizontal, the horizontal point of the circle. The small difference in latitude between the telescope and the basin of mercury was accounted for.

The vertical wires were used for observing transits of stars, each wire furnishing a separate result. The time of transit over the middle wire was estimated, during subsequent analysis of the data, for each wire by adding or subtracting the known interval between the middle wire and the wire in question. These known intervals were predetermined by timing a star of known declination passing from one wire to the other, the pole star being best on account of its slow motion. \ Timings were originally made by an "eye and ear" method, estimating the interval between two beats of a clock. Later, timings were registered by pressing a key, the electrical signal making a mark on a strip recorder. Later still, the eye end of the telescope was usually fitted with an impersonal micrometer, a device which allowed matching a vertical crosshair's motion to the star's motion. Set precisely on the moving star, the crosshair would trigger the electrical timing of the meridian crossing, removing the observer's personal equation from the measurement.

The field of the wires could be illuminated; the lamps were placed at some distance from the piers in order not to heat the instrument, and the light passed through holes in the piers and through the hollow axis to the center, whence it was directed to the eye-end by a system of prisms.

To determine absolute declinations or polar distances, it was necessary to determine the observatory's colatitude, or distance of the celestial pole from the zenith, by observing the upper and lower culmination of a number of circumpolar stars. The difference between the circle reading after observing a star and the reading corresponding to the zenith was the zenith distance of the star, and this plus the colatitude was the north polar distance. To determine the zenith point of the circle, the telescope was directed vertically downwards at a basin of mercury, the surface of which formed an absolutely horizontal mirror. The observer saw the horizontal wire and its reflected image, and moving the telescope to make these coincide, its optical axis was made perpendicular to the plane of the horizon, and the circle reading was 180° + zenith point.

In observations of stars refraction was taken into account as well as the errors of graduation and flexure. If the bisection of the star on the horizontal wire was not made in the centre of the field, allowance was made for curvature, or the deviation of the star's path from a great circle, and for the inclination of the horizontal wire to the horizon. The amount of this inclination was found by taking repeated observations of the zenith distance of a star during the one transit, the pole star being the most suitable because of its slow motion.

Attempts were made to record the transits of a star photographically. A photographic plate was placed in the focus of a transit instrument and a number of short exposures made, their length and the time being registered automatically by a clock. The exposing shutter was a thin strip of steel, fixed to the armature of an electromagnet. The plate thus recorded a series of dots or short lines, and the vertical wires were photographed on the plate by throwing light through the objective lens for one or two seconds.

=== Adjustment ===
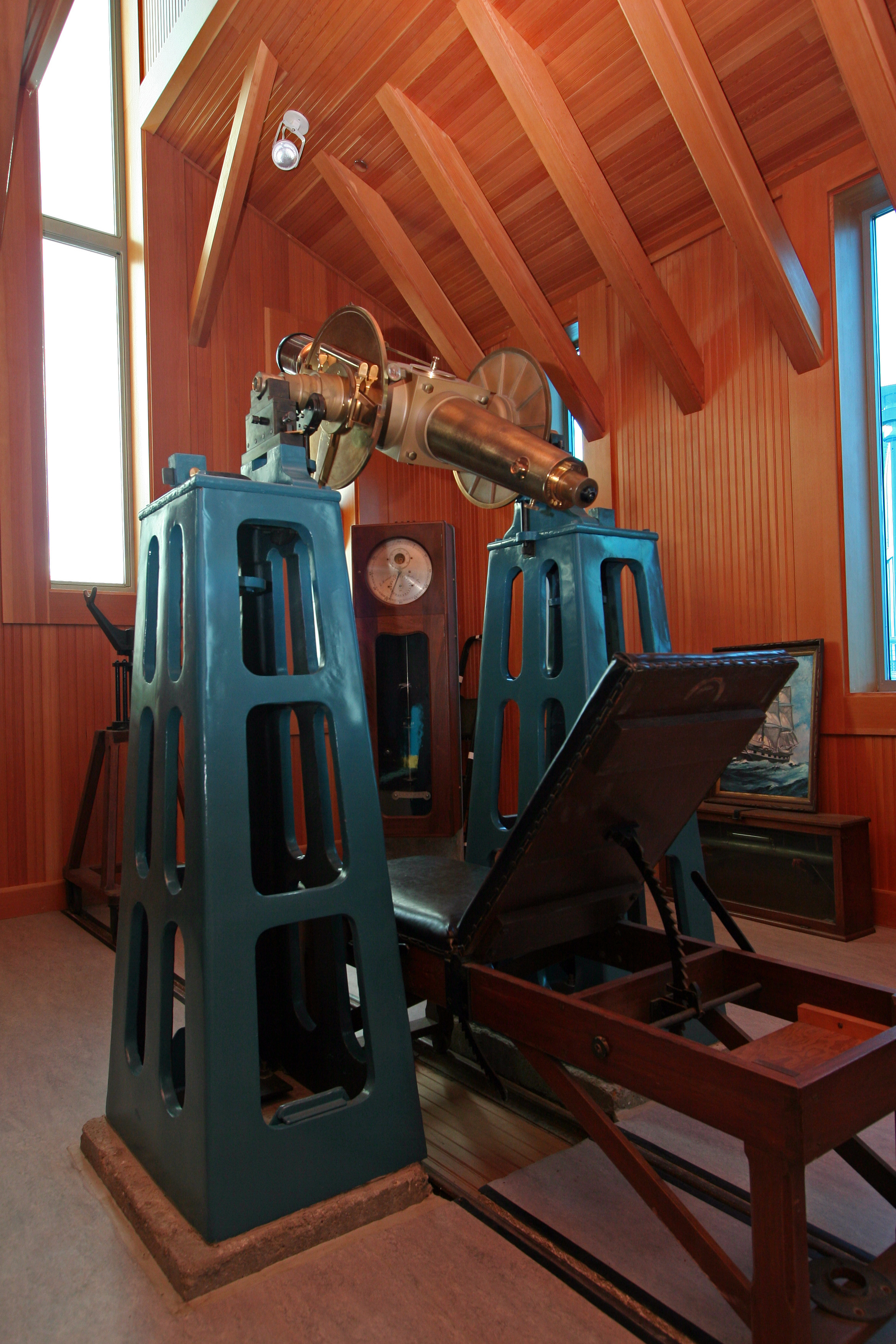
Chabot Space & Science Center's meridian transit telescope in Oakland, California, built by Fauth, 1885. Note the observer's chair between the piers, and the narrow opening in the wall and roof for access to the sky. Because the telescope observes only in the meridian, no rotating dome is necessary.

Meridian circles required precise adjustment to do accurate work.

The rotation axis of the main telescope needed to be exactly horizontal. A sensitive spirit level, designed to rest on the pivots of the axis, performed this function. By adjusting one of the V-shaped bearings, the bubble was centered.

The line of sight of the telescope needed to be exactly perpendicular to the axis of rotation. This could be done by sighting a distant, stationary object, lifting and reversing the telescope on its bearings, and again sighting the object. If the crosshairs did not intersect the object, the line of sight was halfway between the new position of the crosshairs and the distant object; the crosshairs were adjusted accordingly and the process repeated as necessary. Also, if the rotation axis was known to be perfectly horizontal, the telescope could be directed downward at a basin of mercury, and the crosshairs illuminated. The mercury acted as a perfectly horizontal mirror, reflecting an image of the crosshairs back up the telescope tube. The crosshairs could then be adjusted until coincident with their reflection, and the line of sight was then perpendicular to the axis.

The line of sight of the telescope needed to be exactly within the plane of the meridian. This was done approximately by building the piers and the bearings of the axis on an east–west line. The telescope was then brought into the meridian by repeatedly timing the (apparent, incorrect) upper and lower meridian transits of a circumpolar star and adjusting one of the bearings horizontally until the interval between the transits was equal. Another method used calculated meridian crossing times for particular stars as established by other observatories. This was an important adjustment, and much effort was spent in perfecting it.

In practice, none of these adjustments were perfect. The small errors introduced by the imperfections were mathematically corrected during the analysis of the data.

== Zenith telescopes ==
Some telescopes designed to measure star transits are zenith telescopes designed to point straight up at or near the zenith for extreme precision measurement of star positions. They use an altazimuth mount, instead of a meridian circle, fitted with leveling screws. Extremely sensitive levels are attached to the telescope mount to make angle measurements and the telescope has an eyepiece fitted with a micrometer.

== History ==
=== Overview ===
The idea of having an instrument (quadrant) fixed in the plane of the meridian occurred even to the ancient astronomers and is mentioned by Ptolemy, but it was not carried into practice until Tycho Brahe constructed a large meridian quadrant.

Meridian circles have been used since the 18th century to accurately measure positions of stars in order to catalog them. This is done by measuring the instant when the star passes through the local meridian. Its altitude above the horizon is noted as well. Knowing one's geographic latitude and longitude these measurements can be used to derive the star's right ascension and declination.

Once good star catalogs were available a transit telescope could be used anywhere in the world to accurately measure local longitude and time by observing local meridian transit times of catalogue stars. Prior to the invention of the atomic clock this was the most reliable source of accurate time.

=== Antiquity ===
In the Almagest, Ptolemy describes a meridian circle which consisted of a fixed graduated outer ring and a movable inner ring with tabs that used a shadow to set the Sun's position. It was mounted vertically and aligned with the meridian. The instrument was used to measure the altitude of the Sun at noon in order to determine the path of the ecliptic.

=== 17th century ===
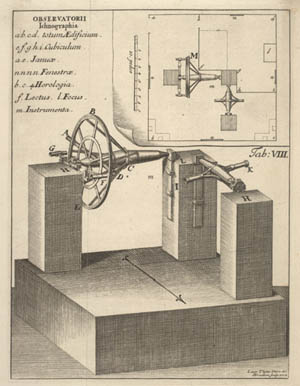
The world's first meridian circle from Ole Rømer's Observatorium Tusculanum in Denmark

A meridian circle enabled the observer to simultaneously determine right ascension and declination, but it does not appear to have been much used for right ascension during the 17th century, the method of equal altitudes by portable quadrants or measures of the angular distance between stars with an astronomical sextant being preferred. These methods were very inconvenient, and in 1690, Ole Rømer invented the transit instrument.

=== 18th century ===
The transit instrument consists of a horizontal axis in the direction east and west resting on firmly fixed supports, and having a telescope fixed at right angles to it, revolving freely in the plane of the meridian. At the same time Rømer invented the altitude and azimuth instrument for measuring vertical and horizontal angles, and in 1704, he combined a vertical circle with his transit instrument, so as to determine both co-ordinates at the same time.

This latter idea was, however, not adopted elsewhere, although the transit instrument soon came into universal use (the first one at Greenwich being mounted in 1721), and the mural quadrant continued until the end of the century to be employed for determining declinations. The advantages of using a whole circle, it being less liable to change its figure and not requiring reversal in order to observe stars north of the zenith, were then again recognized by Jesse Ramsden, who also improved the method of reading off angles by means of a micrometer microscope as described below.

=== 19th century ===
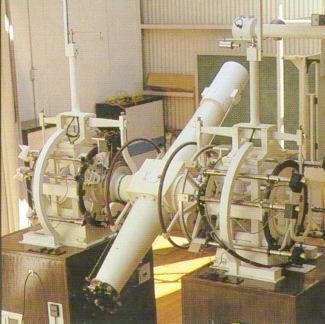
The 6-inch transit circle of the U.S. Naval Observatory, built by Warner and Swasey, 1898

The making of circles was shortly afterwards taken up by Edward Troughton, who constructed the first modern transit circle in 1806 for Groombridge's observatory at Blackheath, the Groombridge Transit Circle (a meridian transit circle). Troughton afterwards abandoned the idea and designed the mural circle to take the place of the mural quadrant.

In the United Kingdom, the transit instrument and mural circle continued until the middle of the 19th century to be the principal instrument in observatories, the first transit circle constructed there being that at Greenwich (mounted in 1850). However, on the continent, the transit circle superseded them from the years 1818–1819, when two circles by Johann Georg Repsold and Georg Friedrich von Reichenbach were mounted at Göttingen, and one by Reichenbach at Königsberg. The firm of Repsold and Sons was for a number of years eclipsed by that of Pistor and Martins in Berlin, who furnished various observatories with first-class instruments. Following the death of Martins, the Repsolds again took the lead and made many transit circles. The observatories of Harvard College, Cambridge University and Edinburgh University had large circles by Troughton and Simms.

The Airy Transit Circles at the Royal Greenwich Observatory (1851) and that at the Royal Observatory, Cape of Good Hope (1855) were made by Ransomes and May of Ipswich. The Greenwich instrument had optical and instrumental work by Troughton and Simms to the design of George Biddell Airy.

=== 20th century and beyond ===
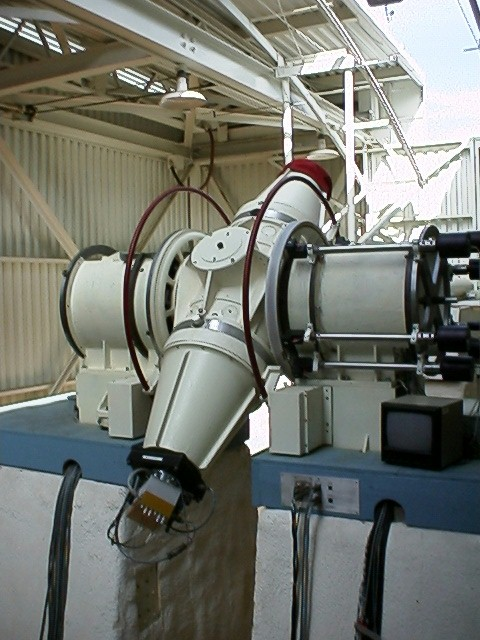
The Ron Stone/Flagstaff Astrometric Scanning Transit Telescope of the United States Naval Observatory Flagstaff Station, built by Farrand Optical Company, 1981

A modern-day example of this type of telescope is the 8 inch (~0.2m) Flagstaff Astrometric Scanning Transit Telescope (FASTT) at the USNO Flagstaff Station Observatory. Modern meridian circles are usually automated. The observer is replaced with a CCD camera. As the sky drifts across the field of view, the image built up in the CCD is clocked across (and out of) the chip at the same rate. This allows some improvements:

- The CCD can collect light for as long as the image is crossing it, allowing a dimmer limiting magnitude to be reached.
- The data can be collected for as long as the telescope is in operation – an entire night is possible, allowing a strip of sky many degrees in length to be scanned.
- Data can be compared directly to any reference object which happens to be within the scan – usually a bright extragalactic object, like a quasar, with an accurately-known position. This eliminates the need for some of the painstaking adjustment of the meridian instrument, although monitoring of declination, azimuth, and level is still performed with CCD scanners and laser interferometers.
- Atmospheric refraction can be accounted for automatically, by monitoring temperature, pressure, and dew point of the air electronically.
- Data can be stored and analyzed at will.

The first automated instrument was the Carlsberg Automatic Meridian Circle, which came online in 1984.

== Examples ==
- Groombridge Transit Circle (1806)
- Carlsberg Meridian Telescope (Carlsberg Automatic Meridian Circle) (1984)
- Tokyo Photoelectric Meridian Circle (1985)

== See also ==
- List of telescope types
