= Jeremy Chabriel =

French–Australian actor (born 2001)

- Born: 2 December 2001 (age 24); Toulouse, France
- Occupation: Actor
- Years active: 2015–present

Jeremy Chabriel (born 2 December 2001) is a French–Australian actor. He is best known for his role as Alexander in Ariel Kleiman's film Partisan, candidate at the 2015 Sundance Film Festival.

== Biography ==
Chabriel was born in Toulouse, France. He now lives in Kuala Lumpur, Malaysia.

From the age of two, Chabriel travelled with his parents and brother to various countries, experiencing different cultures.

He planned to take acting lessons when his family heard about the casting for Partisan, and was offered the chance to audition and play this role.

== Filmography ==
=== Film ===
| Year | Title | Role |
|---|---|---|
| 2015 | Partisan | Alexander |
