= James South =

British astronomer (1785–1867)

Sir James South FRS FRSE FRAS FLS LLD
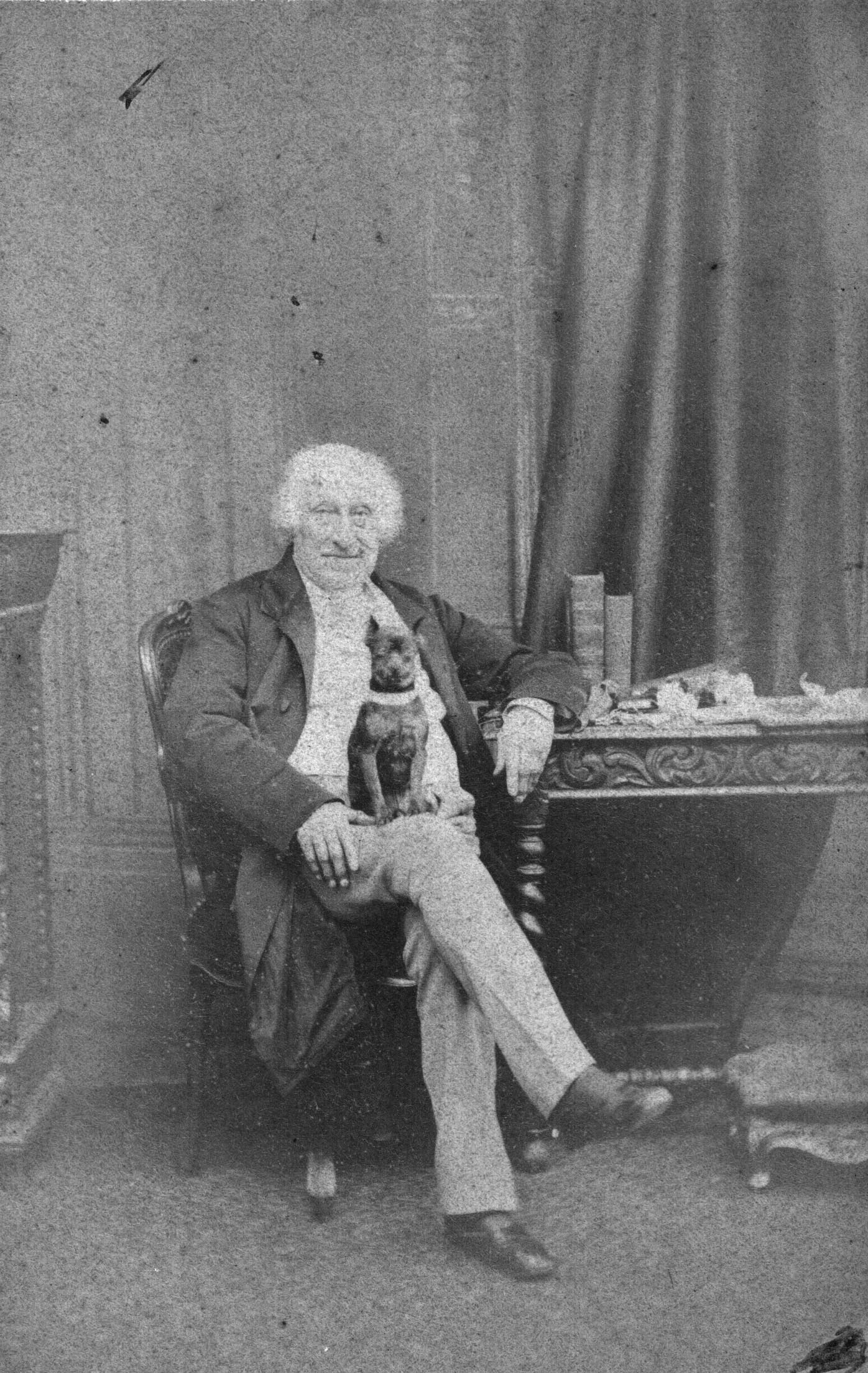
- South in 1855–1867
- Born: 15 October 1785; Southwark, England
- Died: 19 October 1867 (aged 82); Campden Hill, England
- Citizenship: British
- Known for: Astronomy
- Awards: Copley medal (1826); Gold Medal of the Royal Astronomical Society (1826)
- Scientific career
- Fields: Astronomy; chemistry; horology; surgery

Sir James South (October 1785 – 19 October 1867) was a British astronomer.

He was a joint founder of the Astronomical Society of London, and it was under his name, as President of the Society in 1831, that a petition was successfully submitted to obtain a Royal Charter, whereupon it became the Royal Astronomical Society.

== Life ==
He was born in Southwark in London in October 1785, the son of James South, a pharmaceutical chemist. John Flint South was his younger half-brother. He originally trained as a chemist, then as a surgeon, but his interests in astronomy overtook all things.

In 1821 he was elected a Fellow of the Royal Society of London and in 1822 a Fellow of the Royal Society of Edinburgh his proposer being Edward Troughton.

He won the Copley Medal in 1826 and the Gold Medal of the Royal Astronomical Society in that same year.

He was knighted by King William IV in 1831.

Starting around 1826, James South made plans for a new, larger telescope, an equatorially mounted achromatic refractor (a telescope with a lens) in a new observatory. He bought a 12-inch (actually about 11.8) aperture lens from Robert-Aglaé Cauchoix in Paris for about 1000 pounds, large enough to be the biggest achromatic object lens in the world at the time. The telescope for the lens was completed, but dismantled around 1838. The next largest refractor, was at the Markree Observatory, which successfully completed a 13.3-inch refractor (also a Cauchoix of Paris lens) in the 1830s on a Thomas Grubb mount. The problem for James South's telescope was the equatorial mount.

South was involved in a notorious lawsuit brought against him by the instrument maker Edward Troughton over this equatorial-mount telescope which the latter had constructed for him, and which South considered defective. Troughton sued him for payment and won. South promptly demolished the telescope mount; the 12-inch lens, which had been purchased separately, was preserved and presented to the (Dublin) Dunsink Observatory in 1862. The Observatory mounted it on a Grubb equatorial, where it survives to the present day. (See also Great refractors)

James was the second owner of the Groombridge Transit Circle of 1806 (after Stephen Groombridge).

He died at the observatory on Campden Hill in Kensington on 19 October 1867, and was buried on the west side of Highgate Cemetery.

== Family ==
In 1816 he married Charlotte Ellis (d.1851). She was an heiress and his new-found wealth enabled him to give up surgery and concentrate on astronomy.

== Works ==
South and John Herschel jointly produced a catalogue of 380 double stars in 1824, reobserving many of the double stars that had been discovered by William Herschel. South then continued and observed another 458 double stars over the following year.

== Recognition ==
Craters on Mars and the Moon are named in his honour.
