= William Groombridge =

William Groombridge may refer to:

- William Ironside Groombridge, secretary of English football club Gillingham/New Brompton
- William Groombridge (painter)

== See also ==
- Groombridge (disambiguation)
