= Gliese 15 Ac =

Subjovian planet orbiting Gliese 15 A

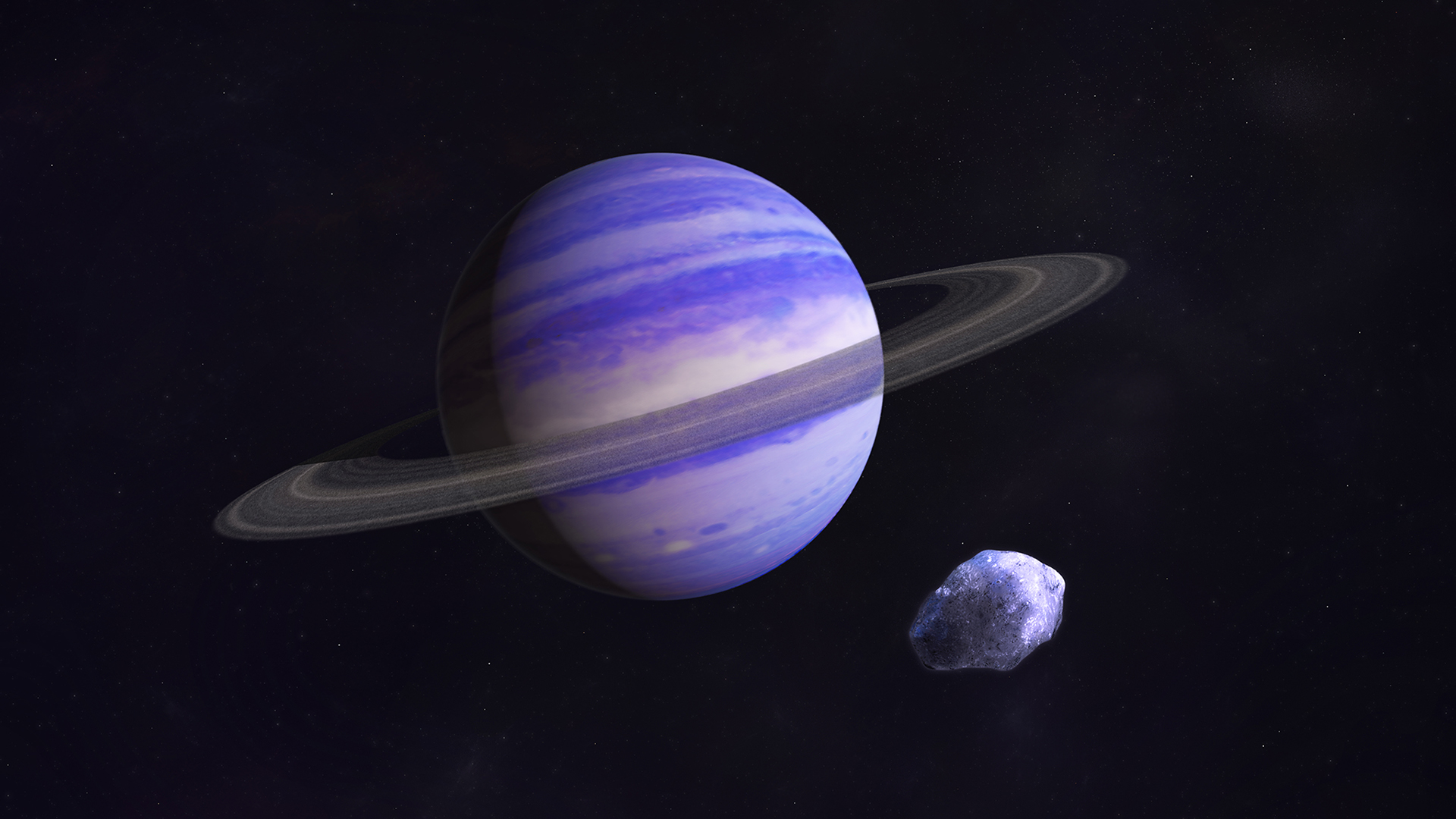
- Artist's impression of a Neptune-type exoplanet like Gliese 15 Ac.

Discovery
- Discovered by: Pinamonti et al.
- Discovery site: HARPS-N
- Discovery date: April 2018
- Detection method: Radial velocity

Designations
- Alternative names: Groombridge 34 Ac, GX Andromedae c

Orbital characteristics
- Semi-major axis: 5.4+1.0 −0.9 AU
- Eccentricity: 0.27+0.28 −0.19
- Orbital period (sidereal): 7600+2200 −1700 d
- Longitude of periastron: −58.40+100.80 −53.30
- Semi-amplitude: 2.5+1.3 −1.0
- Star: Groombridge 34 A

Physical characteristics
- Mass: ≥36+25 −18 M_{🜨}

Gliese 15 Ac (also known as Groombridge 34 Ac, GX Andromedae c) is an exoplanet orbiting the nearby red dwarf star Gliese 15 A (Groombridge 34 A, GX Andromedae), which is part of a binary star system located about 11.6 light-years from the Sun. The planet was first proposed in October 2017 using radial velocity data from the CARMENES spectrograph, combined with measurements from the HARPS and HIRES spectrographs, and its existence was confirmed in April 2018 using HARPS-N data. It has a minimum mass 36 times that of Earth and orbits at around 5.4 astronomical units with a period of 7,600 days (21 years), an orbit which may have been sculpted by interaction with the companion star, Gliese 15 B. As of 2020, Gliese 15 Ac is the longest-period sub-Jovian planet discovered by radial velocity.
