= Partisan (film) =

- Theatrical film poster
- Directed by: Ariel Kleiman
- Written by: Sarah Cyngler; Ariel Kleiman
- Produced by: Anna McLeish
- Starring: Vincent Cassel; Nigel Barber; Jeremy Chabriel; Florence Mezzara; Timothy Styles
- Cinematography: Germain McMicking
- Edited by: Jack Hutchings
- Music by: Daniel Lopatin
- Release date: January 25, 2015 (Sundance Film Festival)
- Running time: 98 minutes
- Country: Australia
- Language: English
- Box office: $91,430

Partisan is a 2015 Australian film directed by Ariel Kleiman. The film stars Vincent Cassel as Gregori, a cult leader. The feature marks Kleiman's directorial debut. Kleiman wrote the film with his girlfriend Sarah Cyngler. It premiered at the 2015 Sundance Film Festival.

== Plot ==
Gregori, who operates as the patriarch to a "family" of child assassins, adopts Alexander after seeing his mother, Susanna, without a partner at a hospital. Eleven years later, Alexander is an adept assassin running missions with other future child assassins adopted in the same manner. Gregori tells the children the world is full of terrible men which is why they must carry out their missions. Gregori teaches the children to put earplugs in during assassinations to protect their ears from the gunshot.

Leo, Alexander's friend, is critical of himself after a mock assassination. Gregori sends Alexander and a girl on a mission where he kills a mechanic. Alexander sees his mother crying due to pregnancy, after she drops a piece of meat. He goes out during a mission and buys new meat at a local grocery store. The owner treats him kindly and gives him chocolate. Leo begins to question Gregori's authority escalating to a confrontation after Leo witnesses a chicken being slaughtered. He compares the chicken to the Tyrannosaurus rex, fearing its extinction. Leo disappears from the compound afterwards. Alexander begins to question everything he was taught. Susanna gives birth to a baby brother named Tobias. On Alexander's third mission he shoots a man and watches him bleed out. On his way back he meets a boy who plays with his gun before returning it to him. Alexander takes Tobias after coming home. He is confronted by Gregori as the camera pans down Alexander is seen holding his gun pointed at Gregori with earplugs in Tobias' ears.

== Cast ==
- Vincent Cassel as Gregori
- Florence Mezzara as Susanna
- Alex Balaganskiy as Leo
- Jeremy Chabriel as Alexander
- Samuel Eydlish as Ruben
- Anastasia Prystay as Ariana
- Alexander Kuzmenko as Ellis
- Katalin Hegedus
- Rosa Voto as Leo's mother
- Frank Moylan
- Alexander Dahlberg as Nicholas
- Oscar Dahlberg as Oscar
- Wietse Cocu as Felix

== Production ==
While most of the interior scenes were filmed in Kleiman's home country of Australia, the exterior shooting of the film was shot in Georgia in 2013 for five weeks.

The film's score was composed by electronic musician Oneohtrix Point Never.

== Reception ==
=== Critical response ===
On Rotten Tomatoes the film has a rating of 59%, based on 41 reviews, with an average rating of 5.8/10. The site's critical consensus reads, "Well-acted and suitably chilling, Partisan is a dark drama whose confident craft may offer enough for some viewers to look past its flaws." On Metacritic, the film received a rating of 50 out of 100, based on 12 critics, indicating "mixed or average reviews".

=== Accolades ===
Award	Category	Subject	Result
AACTA Awards (5th)	Best Original Music Score	Daniel Lopatin	Nominated
AACTA Awards (5th)	Best Sound	Dane Cody	Nominated
AACTA Awards (5th)	Best Sound	Robert Mackenzie	Nominated
AACTA Awards (5th)	Best Production Design	Steven Jones-Evans	Nominated
AACTA Awards (5th)	Best Production Design	Sarah Cyngler	Nominated
AACTA Awards (5th)	Best Costume Design	Sarah Cyngler	Nominated
AACTA Awards (5th)	Best Costume Design	Maria Pattison	Nominated
AFCA Awards	Best Film	Anna McLeish	Nominated
AFCA Awards	Best Director	Ariel Kleiman	Nominated
AFCA Awards	Best Screenplay	Ariel Kleiman	Nominated
AFCA Awards	Best Screenplay	Sarah Cyngler	Nominated
AFCA Awards	Best Actor	Vincent Cassel	Nominated
AFCA Awards	Best Supporting Actor	Jeremy Chabriel	Nominated
AFCA Awards	Best Cinematography	Germain McMicking	Nominated
FCCA Awards	Best Performance by a Young Actor	Jeremy Chabriel	Nominated
FCCA Awards	Best Music	Daniel Lopatin	Nominated
BFI London Film Festival	Sutherland Award - First Feature Competition	Ariel Kleiman	Nominated
Sundance Film Festival	Grand Jury Prize - World Cinema - Dramatic	Ariel Kleiman	Nominated
Sundance Film Festival	Cinematography Award - World Cinema - Dramatic	Germain McMicking	Won
