= Groombridge 1830 =

Star in the constellation Ursa Major

- Groombridge 1830 (circled in red) in Ursa Major

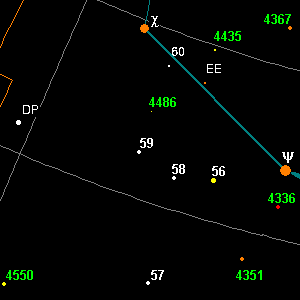
- Detailed position of HR 4550 ( = Groombridge 1830; bottom-left edge) related to χ UMa and ψ UMa

Observation data Epoch J2000 Equinox ICRS
- Constellation: Ursa Major
- Right ascension: 11^{h} 52^{m} 58.76734^{s}
- Declination: +37° 43′ 07.2541″
- Apparent magnitude (V): 6.44

Characteristics
- Evolutionary stage: main sequence
- Spectral type: K1V Fe−1.5
- U−B color index: +0.16
- B−V color index: +0.75
- Variable type: Suspected

Astrometry
Radial velocity (R_{v})	−98.05±0.12 km/s
Proper motion (μ)	RA: +4,002.7 mas/yr Dec.: −5,817.8 mas/yr
Parallax (π)	109.0296±0.0197 mas
Distance	29.914 ± 0.005 ly (9.172 ± 0.002 pc)
Absolute magnitude (M_{V})	6.64

Details
Mass	0.63±0.02 M_{☉}
Radius	0.586±0.004 R_{☉}
Luminosity	0.221±0.005 L_{☉}
Surface gravity (log g)	4.702±0.015 cgs
Temperature	5,174±32 K
Metallicity [Fe/H]	−1.26±0.07 dex
Rotation	32.2
Rotational velocity (v sin i)	0.5 km/s
Age	4.7–5.3 Gyr

Other designations
- Groombridge 1830, Argelander's Star, CF UMa, BD+38 2285, FK5 1307, GJ 451, HD 103095, HIP 57939, HR 4550, SAO 62738, LHS 44, LTT 13276, PLX 2745

Database references
SIMBAD	data

Groombridge 1830, also known as Argelander's Star, is a star 29.9 light-years away in the constellation Ursa Major. With an apparent magnitude of 6.4, it is near the limit of naked eye visibility under ideal conditions. It has a low metallicity and is thought to be a superflare star.

== Discovery and naming ==
The star was catalogued by British astronomer Stephen Groombridge with the Groombridge Transit Circle between 1806 and the 1830s and published posthumously in his star catalog, Catalogue of Circumpolar Stars (1838). The designation Groombridge 1830 comes from this catalog; in older sources it may be written as 1830 Groombridge. Its high proper motion was noted by Friedrich Wilhelm Argelander in 1842, and so it is sometimes called Argelander's Star, a name first used in an 1853 paper. Due to its high proper motion, it has also been called the Flying Star or Runaway Star (compare 61 Cygni and Barnard's Star).

Other designations for this star include HD 103095, HR 4550, and Gliese 451. It has the variable star designation CF Ursae Majoris, which originally referred to a supposed flaring companion star that is no longer believed to exist.

== Description ==
Groombridge 1830 has been variously classified as a K-type main-sequence star, a G-type main-sequence star, or a G-type subdwarf. The low metallicity of this star makes some of its spectral lines resemble those of a G-class star, and it has been given as a spectral standard for the class G7V.

It is 29.9 light-years (9.2 parsecs) from the Sun as measured by the Gaia spacecraft, which, as the distance is nearly 10 parsecs, means its absolute magnitude is almost equal to its apparent magnitude. It is a member of the galactic halo; such stars account for only 0.1 to 0.2 percent of the stars near the Sun. Like most halo stars, it has a low abundance of elements other than hydrogen and helium—what astronomers term a metal-poor star.

Once suspected to be a binary star with a red dwarf flare star companion, the current consensus is that it is single. Previous observations of stellar flares, suspected to be from a companion star, were probably "superflares" on the primary star—analogous to the Sun's solar flares, but hundreds to millions of times more energetic. It was one of the first nine identified superflare stars.

== Proper motion ==
When discovered, Groombridge 1830 had the highest known proper motion of any star, replacing 61 Cygni. Kapteyn's Star and Barnard's Star have since been identified as having even higher proper motions. It is considerably farther away than either of those stars, however, which means its transverse velocity is greater.

== See also ==
- List of star systems within 25–30 light-years
