= Troughton Rocks =

Rocks in Antarctica

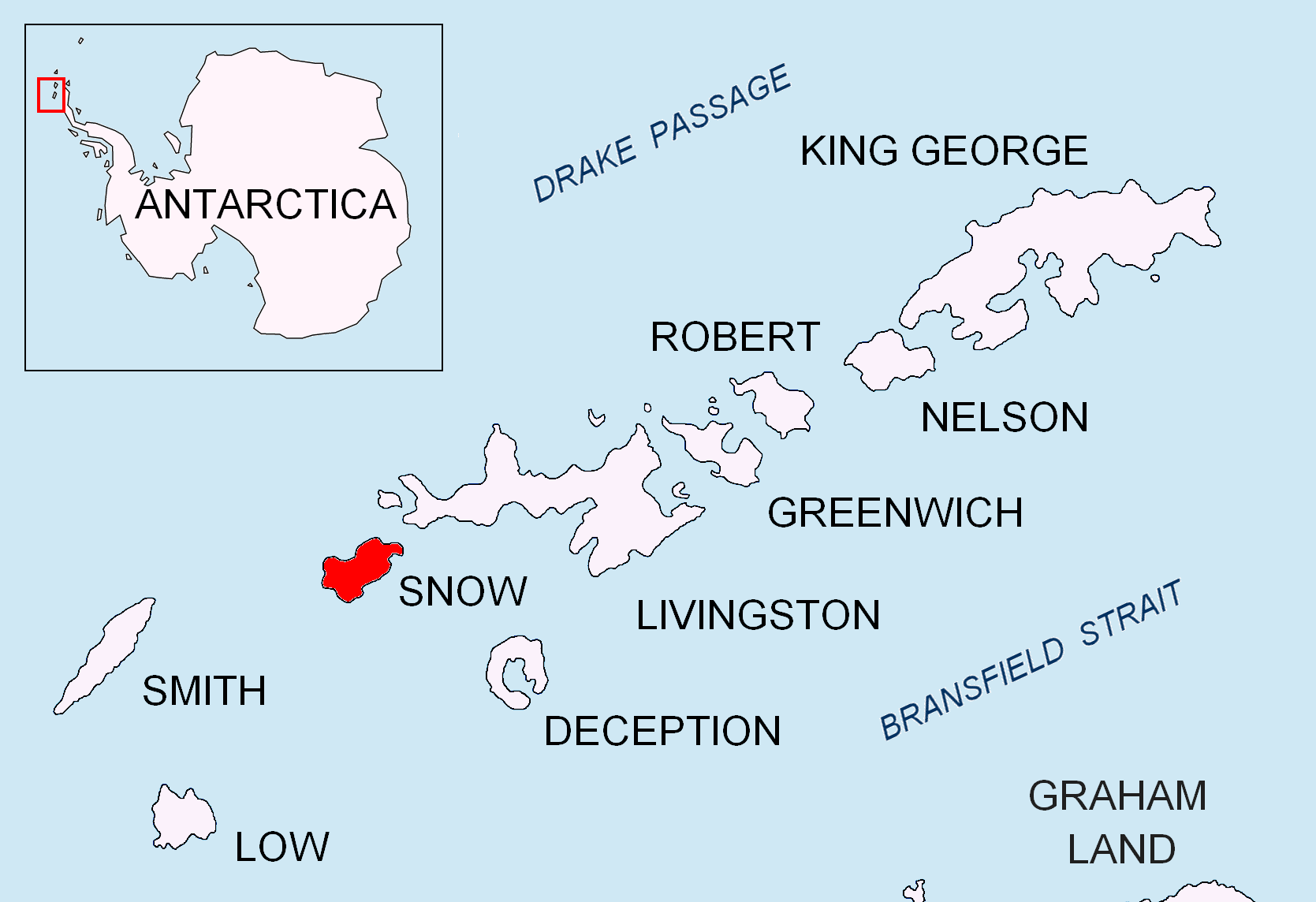
- Location of Snow Island in the South Shetland Islands

- Location within Antarctica Location within South Shetland Islands

Geography
- Location: Antarctica
- Coordinates: 62°44′42″S 61°33′23″W
- Archipelago: South Shetland Islands
- Area: 27 ha (67 acres)
- Length: 315 m (1033 ft)
- Width: 120 m (390 ft)

Administration
- Administered under the Antarctic Treaty

Demographics
- Population: uninhabited

Topographic map of Livingston, Greenwich, Robert, Snow and Smith Islands

Troughton Rocks (Bulgarian: скали Трутън, romanized: skali Troughton, IPA: [skɐˈli ˈtrutən]) are the group of rocks off the northwest extremity of Snow Island in the South Shetland Islands, Antarctica lying in an aquatory of 27 ha that is 315 m long in east-west direction and 120 m wide. The vicinity was visited by early 19th century sealers.

The feature is named after Edward Troughton (1753-1835), a British instrument maker who improved the theodolite design; in association with other names in the area deriving from the early development or use of geodetic instruments and methods.

== Location ==
Troughton Rocks are centred at 62°44′42″S 61°33′23″W, which is 2.7 km west-northwest of Byewater Point. British mapping in 1968.

== See also ==
- List of Antarctic and subantarctic islands

== Maps ==
- South Shetland Islands. Scale 1:200000 topographic map. DOS 610 Sheet W 62 60. Tolworth, UK, 1968
- L. Ivanov. Antarctica: Livingston Island and Greenwich, Robert, Snow and Smith Islands. Scale 1:120000 topographic map. Troyan: Manfred Wörner Foundation, 2010. ISBN 978-954-92032-9-5 (First edition 2009. ISBN 978-954-92032-6-4)
- Antarctic Digital Database (ADD). Scale 1:250000 topographic map of Antarctica. Scientific Committee on Antarctic Research (SCAR). Since 1993, regularly upgraded and updated
