= John Flint South =

British surgeon (1797–1882)

John Flint South (1797–1882) was an English surgeon.

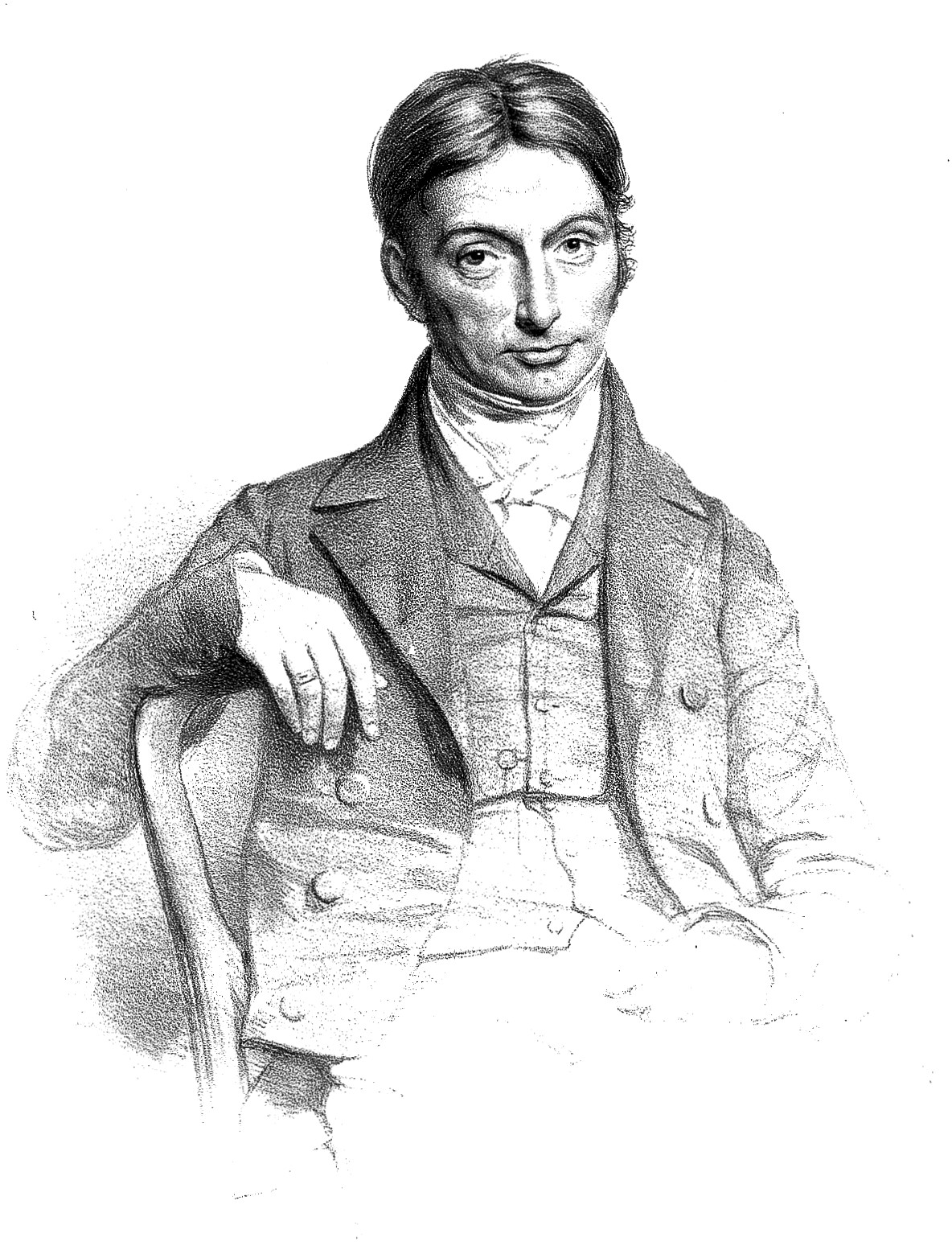
John Flint South, 1848 lithograph

== Life ==
The eldest son by his second wife of James South, a druggist in Southwark, he was born on 5 July 1797; Sir James South, the astronomer, was his half-brother. He was put to school in October 1805 with Samuel Hemming, D.D., at Hampton, Middlesex, where he remained until June 1813.

South began to attend the practice of St. Thomas's Hospital within a few weeks of leaving school, and on 18 February 1814 he was apprenticed to Henry Cline the younger, then a surgeon there. He attended Sir Astley Cooper's lectures on anatomy, and met in 1813 Joseph Henry Green, a fellow apprentice and lifelong friend.

South was admitted a member of the College of Surgeons of England on 6 Aug. 1819, six months before he had completed his indentures. He then acted for some months as prosector to the lecturers on anatomy at St. Thomas's Hospital, and on 14 December 1820 he was appointed conservator of the museum and assistant demonstrator of anatomy there for a term of three years. He was elected a joint demonstrator of anatomy with Bransby Cooper in February 1823, an election which gave rise to friction between Cooper and Green. He then was made lecturer on anatomy. Illness in 1841 led him to resign his lectureship, and he removed to Blackheath Park, where he lived for the remainder of his life.

South was elected a member of the council of the College of Surgeons on 3 March 1841, and on 28 July of the same year was appointed full surgeon to St. Thomas's Hospital, in place of Benjamin Travers; he resigned in April 1863. He was made surgeon to the Female Orphan Asylum in 1843, and on 27 September 1843 he was nominated one of the first fellows of the Royal College of Surgeons of England. He acted as professor of human anatomy and surgery in the college for 1845, and he was Hunterian orator in 1844. His oration made no mention of John Hunter; a history of medicine, it began early, and the time expired. He became a member of the court of examiners in 1849, president of the Royal College of Surgeons in 1851, and again in 1860. As a vice-president of the Royal College of Surgeons he was instrumental in getting the body of Hunter interred in Westminster Abbey on 28 March 1859. He resigned his official connection with the college in 1873.

In 1852 South went to Sweden, where he introduced the vegetable marrow. As a reward the Swedish Horticultural Society at Stockholm, at the instigation of his friend Retzius, awarded to its Linnæan medal of bronze. Recognised as a Latinist, he was selected to examine articled pupils in Latin before they were apprenticed to the Royal College of Surgeons of England.

South died at Blackheath Park on 8 January 1882, and was buried in Charlton cemetery. He was religious, and threw himself into church work, especially with Sunday schools. In 1831 he was a prime mover in establishing the Surrey Zoological and Botanical Society.

== Works ==
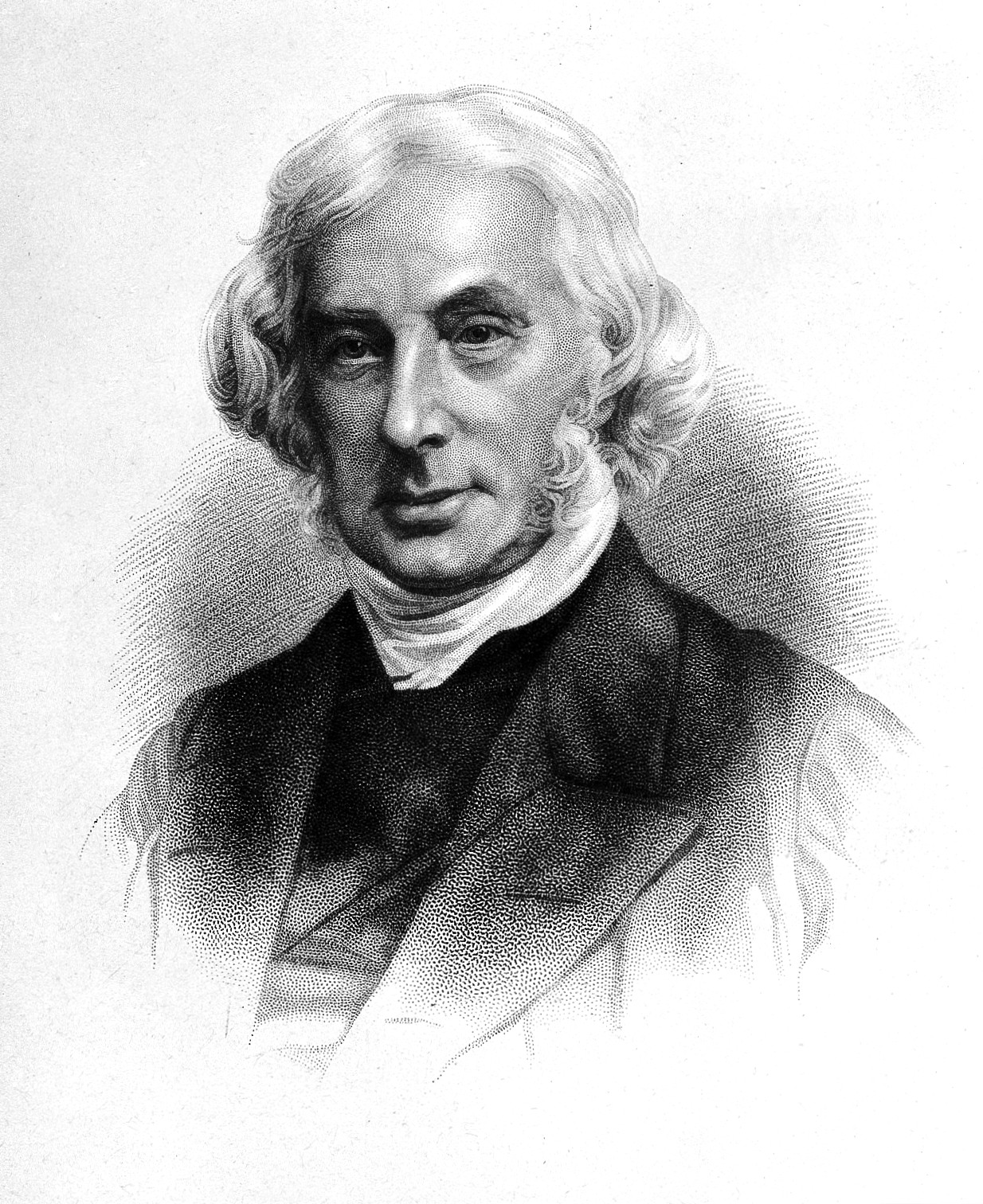
John Flint South engraving

Besides tracts on surgical and religious subjects and the articles on the "Zoology of the Invertebrata" in the Encyclopædia Metropolitana, South wrote:

- A Short Description of the Bones, 1825; 2nd edit. London, 1828; 3rd edit. 1837.
- Household Surgery, London, 1847; 2nd edit. 1850; 3rd edit. 1851; 4th edit. 1851; 5th edit. (called in error 4th edit.), 1880.
- Memorials of the Craft of Surgery, edited by D'Arcy Power, with an introduction by Sir James Paget, London, 1886.

He translated:

- Adolph Wilhelm Otto's Compendium of Human and Comparative Pathological Anatomy, London, 1831;
- Maximilian Joseph von Chelius's System of Surgery, 2 vols., London, 1847. He interwove with this work much of his own surgical experience.

The last twenty years of South's life were spent in gathering material for a history of English surgery; it was edited by D'Arcy Power in 1886 as Memorials of the Craft of Surgery. South also edited the St. Thomas's Hospital Reports for 1836, and assisted J. H. Green in preparing the second and third editions of The Dissector's Manual.

== Family ==
South was twice married; first, in 1832, to Mrs. John Wrench, the second daughter of Thomas Lett of Dulwich House. After her death, in 1864, he married, the following year, Emma, daughter of John Louis Lemmé of Antwerp and London, the niece of his friend J. H. Green. There were children of both marriages.

== Notes ==
Attribution

This article incorporates text from a publication now in the public domain: Lee, Sidney, ed. (1898). "South, John Flint". Dictionary of National Biography. Vol. 53. London: Smith, Elder & Co.
