= Virgin Territory =

2007 film by David Leland

- Theatrical release poster
- Directed by: David Leland
- Written by: David Leland
- Based on: Decameron by Giovanni Boccaccio
- Produced by: Tarak Ben Ammar; Roberto Cavalli; Dino De Laurentiis; Martha De Laurentiis
- Starring: Hayden Christensen; Mischa Barton; Tim Roth
- Narrated by: Craig Parkinson
- Cinematography: Ben Davis
- Music by: Ilan Eshkeri
- Production companies: Ingenious Film Partners; Dino De Laurentiis Company
- Distributed by: Eagle Pictures (Italy); Quinta Communications (France)
- Release dates: December 17, 2007 (Greece); July 23, 2008 (France); September 5, 2008 (Italy)
- Running time: 97 minutes
- Countries: Italy; United Kingdom; France; Luxembourg
- Language: English
- Box office: $5.4 million

Virgin Territory is a 2007 romantic comedy film directed by David Leland. It was the last film produced by Dino De Laurentiis. The film stars Hayden Christensen, Mischa Barton, Tim Roth, Rosalind Halstead and Kate Groombridge. It is based upon Giovanni Boccaccio's 14th-century tale The Decameron. The film was released in France on December 12, 2007.

== Plot ==
The film is set in Florence (Republic of Florence) during the Black Death. As in the Decameron, ten young Florentines take refuge from the plague. But instead of telling stories, they have lusty adventures, bawdy exchanges, romance and swordplay. There are randy nuns, Saracen pirates, and a sexy cow.

Pampinea is the daughter of a wealthy merchant who has died moments before the start of the movie. Lorenzo is a young man in town who is exceptionally good at gambling and is charmed by her beauty. Gerbino De Ratta is the head of the local thugs who robs anyone or steals anything that he sees stealable. Count Dzerzhinsky, from the city of Novgorod in Novgorod Republic (now in modern Russia), is Pampinea's fiancé who she has never met. Their fate intertwines after Pampinea's father died and Gerbino robs Pampinea of her fortune, saying her father was in debt. The only way for the merchant's daughter to save her life was to marry him, according to Gerbino himself.

Lorenzo was being chased by Gerbino after he bested him at a gambling table, then took refuge in a convent by posing as a "deaf and dumb" gardener. At this convent, he has sex with all of the horny nuns, but only until Pampinea's arrival. Pampinea—trying to escape from Gerbino's grasp—ran to the convent for shelter. There she witnesses Lorenzo, whom she'd long had feelings for, having sex with the nuns and get jealous. She blindfolds Lorenzo and kisses him passionately out of love. But then, out of jealousy, she informs the convent's abbess of his deception, that he is actually neither deaf nor dumb.

The Count arrives in Florence only to be ambushed by Gerbino's men. All of his companions are killed, but he survives. Receiving a message from Pampinea's servant, Count Dzerzhinsky rides to Pampinea's father's mansion for the wedding, for he has been promised her hand in marriage. On the way, the young Count meets a skinny dipping Elissa—Pampinea's best friend, who is on her way to attend the wedding—and the two subsequently fall in love. The Count is led to believe Elissa is Pampinea.

Chased out of the convent, Lorenzo follows Pampinea to her father's mansion. There he confesses to her that he's fallen in love with the nun who kissed him while blindfolded, the woman whose face he never got to see. Later, Gerbino and his men arrive at the mansion and imprison Lorenzo. Pampinea agrees to marry Gerbino right that day to save Lorenzo, and thus Lorenzo is banished to the woods. There he meets Dzerzhinsky who is on his way to the mansion to be married to 'Pampinea' (actually Elissa) and the two team up to take out Gerbino's men. Gerbino himself dies falling into a large deep well inside the mansion.

Pampinea, in love with Lorenzo, refuses to marry Count Dzerzhinsky, only to realise moments later that the Count himself is actually in love with Elissa who has been posing as her. She happily then runs after Lorenzo and kisses him. Lorenzo realises that she is in fact the nun he's in love with and they hold their wedding that very day, with all of their friends attending.

== Cast ==
- Hayden Christensen as Lorenzo de Lamberti
- Mischa Barton as Pampinea Anastargi
- Tim Roth as Gerbino Della Ratta
- Ryan Cartwright as Ghino
- Rosalind Halstead as Filomena
- Kate Groombridge as Elissa
- Christopher Egan as Dioneo
- Nigel Planer as Uncle Bruno
- Matthew Rhys as Count Dzerzhinsky
- Rupert Friend as Alessandro Felice
- Silvia Colloca as Sister Lisabetta
- Anna Galiena as The Abbess
- Elisabetta Canalis as Nun
- Craig Parkinson as Tindaro

== Production ==
The film was co-produced by Italian producer Dino De Laurentiis and his wife, along with Nigel Green's Entertainment Film Distributors and Tarak Ben Ammar's Paris-based La Quinta. It was written and directed by Brit David Leland. De Laurentiis returned to Italy to film it. The largely British cast includes Mischa Barton and Hayden Christensen, along with Tim Roth playing the villain, young actresses Kate Groombridge and Rosalind Halstead, and British comedian Nigel Planer in a cameo as a nitwit named Uncle Bruno. The film was reportedly budgeted at $38 million.

It was produced under the working titles The Decameron, The Decameron: Angels and Virgins, Chasing Temptation, and Guilty Pleasures, before being released under the title Virgin Territory.

== Release ==
The film was released in France on December 12, 2007, under the title Medieval Pie: Territoires Vierges. Rai Cinema acquired theatrical and television rights for Italy. It was released directly-to-DVD in the United States on August 26, 2008. The film's Italian title was Decameron Pie.

== Soundtrack ==
- Wolfman and the Side-Effects — "For Lovers" (featuring Pete Doherty)
- Martina Topley-Bird — "Bless You"
- Groove Armada — "But I Feel Good"
- The Kills — "No Wow (Telephone Radio Germany)"
- Basement Jaxx — "Lucky Star" (featuring Dizzee Rascal)
- Italian X-Rays — "Art of Joy"
- Micah P. Hinson — "Don't You Forget" (featuring The Gospel of Progress)
- Blur — "Tender"
- Martina Topley-Bird — "Da Da Da Da"
