= One Year Later (Andor) =

- Andor episode
- Orson Krennic (Ben Mendelsohn) presides over a secret meeting on the subject of what will eventually develop into the Ghorman Massacre, later depicted in "Who Are You?".
- Episode no.: Season 2 Episode 1
- Directed by: Ariel Kleiman
- Written by: Tony Gilroy
- Cinematography by: Christophe Nuyens
- Editing by: John Gilroy
- Original release date: April 22, 2025
- Running time: 51 minutes

Guest appearances
- Rachelle Diedricks as Niya; Muhannad Bhaier as Wilmon Paak; Dave Chapman (voice) as B2EMO; Joplin Sibtain as Brasso; Ben Mendelsohn as Orson Krennic; Joshua James as Dr. Gorst; Bronte Carmichael as Leida Mothma; Alastair Mackenzie as Perrin Fertha; Pierro Niel-Mee as Erskin Semaj; Ben Miles as Tay Kolma; Richard Dillane as Davo Sculdun; Sam Gilroy as Gerdis; Benjamin Norris as Bardi; Anton Lesser as Major Partagaz; Finley Glasgow as Stekan Sculdun; Rosalind Halstead as Runai Sculdun

Episode chronology
← Previous "Rix Road"	Next → "Sagrona Teema"

"One Year Later" is the first episode of the second season of the American science fiction political drama television series Andor. It is the thirteenth episode of the series overall; it was written by series creator Tony Gilroy and directed by Ariel Kleiman. Set in BBY 4, (Note: 4 years before the Battle of Yavin, i.e., the climax of Star Wars (1977)) a year after the season one finale, the episode marks the first appearance of Director Orson Krennic on Andor, portrayed by Ben Mendelsohn, who reprises the role from the film Rogue One.

"One Year Later" was released on Disney+ on April 22, 2025 as part of a three-episode block also including "Sagrona Teema" and "Harvest", and received positive reviews from critics.

== Plot ==
In BBY 4, one year after the uprising on Ferrix, (Note: As depicted in "Rix Road") Cassian Andor poses as an Imperial test pilot on the planet Sienar in order to steal a prototype of an experimental starfighter, the TIE Avenger. Struggling with the ship's unusual controls, he shoots his way out of the base. Cassian lands the Avenger on a jungle moon where he intends to hand the fighter to another pilot. He is surprised to discover his own ship in ruins and the other pilot missing. He is taken prisoner by members of a guerrilla cell, the Maya Pei Brigade, led by the squabbling Bardi and Gerdis. The rebels fight among themselves over the best course of action.

On the agrarian Outer Rim world of Mina-Rau, Ferrix survivors Wilmon Paak, Brasso, B2EMO and Bix Caleen work for a local farmer. Bix suffers from traumatic dreams of Dr. Gorst, the Imperial scientist who tortured her on Ferrix. They see an Imperial ship arrive, and worry about an Imperial inspection.

On Chandrila, the arranged wedding of Mon Mothma's daughter Leida to Davo Sculdun's son Stekan begins. Mon and Vel Sartha are surprised to see that Luthen Rael and Kleya Marki have been invited by Sculdun. Both refuse to explain their presence at the wedding. Tay Kolma approaches Mon to set a time to "catch up" on an unspecified subject. Luthen is anxious for updates on the progress of Cassian's mission. Kleya is confronted by Vel, and reveals that they have been contracted by Sculdun to provide a gift for the couple. Tay reveals to Mon that his business has gone sour, that his wife has left him, and that he wishes instead to discuss their funding of the Rebellion. Before he can continue, Mon is called away to console Leida, who is distraught over Stekan's unwillingness to hold her hand.

Orson Krennic holds a secret meeting with several Imperial officers, including Dedra Meero and Lio Partagaz, to plan an operation to gather the mineral kalkite from the planet Ghorman for the Emperor's "energy program". The planet is known for its "Ghorman twill", a kind of spider silk fabric used to make luxury garments prized by the galaxy's elites. The planned mining could put enough stress on Ghorman's core to collapse the planet. If no alternative to the required kalkite is found, the gathered officers must make plans to stifle resistance from the local Ghorman population in order to strip-mine the planet as needed. Partagaz and others are nervous that Ghorman is a well-known and politically powerful planet, not a frontier world where they could hide their actions. Several courses of action are suggested, such as faking a natural disaster to encourage the Ghormans to leave voluntarily, but Krennic's advisors have calculated that the risk is too great. Two officers lay out a plan for an anti-Ghorman propaganda campaign, which has already begun. When Dedra is approached by Krennic, she says propaganda will be insufficient and suggests they need a Ghorman resistance that the Empire can "depend on to do the wrong thing".

On the jungle moon, the conflict between the Maya Pei rebels develops into a shootout killing the only pilot other than Cassian, and Cassian is taken away as several rebels around him are killed.

== Production ==
=== Development ===
The episode was written by series creator Tony Gilroy, in his sixth writing credit for the show, and directed by Ariel Kleiman, who would go on to also direct the next five episodes of the series. The episodes of Andor's second season, like those of its first, are split up into blocks, or story arcs, of three episodes; however, unlike in season one, each arc begins with a time skip of one year from the previous episode. Gilroy decided to structure the season this way after concluding that the original five-season plan for the show was unfeasible, and needing some way to bridge the four years between season 1 and Rogue One (2016) in a single season. As proof of concept, he wrote the first and last episodes of each would-be arc, and eventually decided on this structure for the season.

=== Writing ===
The episode's title refers to the one-year time jump between the first season finale and this episode, and appears at the beginning of all three-episode blocks of the season, each time denoting a similar time jump of one year. "One Year Later" marks the beginning of the first three-episode block of the season, and was the last arc to be written. Gilroy finished the script for the third episode on a flight days before the start of the 2023 Writers Guild of America strike. The planet Mina-Rau was named after the daughter of Tom Bissell, another writer for the season, who penned episodes 10-12.

=== Casting ===
Diego Luna, Stellan Skarsgård, Genevieve O'Reilly, Adria Arjona, Denise Gough, Faye Marsay, Elizabeth Dulau, Anton Lesser, Joplin Sibtain, Muhannad Bhaier, Alastair Mackenzie and Richard Dillane all reprise their roles from the first season. In "One Year Later", marking his first appearance on Andor, Ben Mendelsohn reprises his role as Orson Krennic from previous Star Wars media, including Rogue One, in which he served as the main antagonist. The roles of Bardi and Gerdis are played by Benjamin Norris and Sam Gilroy, the son of series creator Tony Gilroy, respectively. The two were cast by Gilroy himself after he observed their rowdy behavior at a family gathering and thought they would serve as good fits for the roles of the squabbling Maya Pei rebels. Pierro Niel-Mee joins the series' ensemble as Erskin Semaj, a character originally seen in Star Wars Rebels (2014–2018) who serves as an aide to Mon.

=== Filming ===
"One Year Later" was filmed in the United Kingdom, similar to the majority of the series. The first block of the season was the last to be filmed, and faced some disruptions due to the 2023 Hollywood labor disputes, specifically in the Central England Midlands, where the crew had planted 80 hectares (200 acres) of rye for the scenes on Mina-Rau.

=== Music ===
The original score for "One Year Later", as with nine other episodes of the season's twelve, (Note: All episodes of season 2 but "Ever Been to Ghorman?" and "I Have Friends Everywhere" credit Roberts as the main composer) was composed by Brandon Roberts, replacing Nicholas Britell, the composer for the show's first season, due to scheduling conflicts. This was the first episode of the series to not feature a new opening title theme, instead reusing Britell's theme for "Kassa", the series premiere.

The soundtrack for the episode was released alongside that of the other two episodes in its block on April 25, 2025 via Walt Disney Records as part of the first of four volumes of the second season's original score.

Andor Season 2: Episode 1 (Original Soundtrack)
No.	Title	Length
1.	"Andor (Main Title Theme) – Episode 1 (Note: This track was composed by Nicholas Britell as the title theme for the series premiere "Kassa", and also appears as the title theme for the series finale "Jedha, Kyber, Erso")"	1:18
2.	"Sienar Avenger"	2:08
3.	"Canyon Run"	2:15
4.	"Remember Me?"	1:22
5.	"The Wedding Begins"	1:29
6.	"Mina-Rau"	2:01
7.	"Jungle Breakdown"	2:26
8.	"Ghorman!"	1:59
Total length:		14:58

== Release ==
"One Year Later" was released on Disney+ on April 22, 2025, as part of a three-episode block, alongside "Sagrona Teema" and "Harvest". The episode was also screened to select audiences at Star Wars Celebration Japan 2025, a few days ahead of the season premiere. The episode was expected to be released in August 2024, but it was delayed due to the 2023 Hollywood labor disputes.

== Reception ==
=== Critical response ===
The review aggregator website Rotten Tomatoes reports a 100% approval rating, based on 8 reviews.

William Hughes of The A.V. Club gave a positive review, writing "The party's kicking off, and the bolts are flying: I'm simply humming with excitement to see where Andor takes us next." Mike Redmond of Pajiba also gave a positive review, highlighting that "the cinematography on this show is still off the charts".

=== Accolades ===
Award	Year	Category	Recipient	Result	Ref.
Astra TV Awards	2025	Best Directing in a Drama Series	Ariel Kleiman	Nominated	
Astra TV Awards	2025	Best Writing in a Drama Series	Tony Gilroy	Nominated	
