= Gliese 15 Ab =

Planet orbiting Gliese 15 A

Discovery
- Discovered by: Andrew W. Howard
- Discovery site: Keck Observatory
- Discovery date: August, 2014
- Detection method: Radial velocity

Orbital characteristics
- Semi-major axis: 0.074±0.001 AU
- Eccentricity: 0.093+0.152 −0.010
- Orbital period (sidereal): 11.441+0.004 −0.002 d
- Star: Groombridge 34A

Physical characteristics
- Mass: > 3.03 M_{🜨}

Gliese 15 Ab (GJ 15 Ab), also called Groombridge 34 Ab, (Note: In the discovery paper, discoverers call this object "Gl 15 Ab", and never "Groombridge 34 Ab".) rarely called GX Andromedae b, is an extrasolar planet approximately 11,6 light-years away in the constellation of Andromeda. It is found in the night sky orbiting the star Gliese 15 A, which is at right ascension 00h 18m 22.89s and declination +44° 01′ 22.6″.

== Discovery ==
It was discovered in August 2014, deduced from analysis of the radial velocities of the parent star by the Eta-Earth Survey using HIRES at Keck Observatory. It has around 5.35 ± 0.75 Earth masses, and is thought to be a Super-Earth with a diameter greater than that of the Earth. However, researchers using the CARMENES spectrograph failed to detect the planet in 2017. The detection of planet was recovered in 2018, with revised minimum mass of 3.03 M_{🜨}.

== Orbit ==
Gliese 15 Ab has a close inner orbit around Gliese 15 A with a semi-major axis of only 0.0717 ± 0.0034 AU, making an orbital period that is just a little longer than 11.4 days, the orbit appears to be relatively circular, with an orbital eccentricity of about 0.12. It orbits too close to Gliese 15 A to be located in the habitable zone and is unlikely to harbour life.
