= Tokyo Photoelectric Meridian Circle =

Coordinates: 35.6750°N 139.5353°E

The Tokyo Photoelectric Meridian Circle (PMC) is a meridian circle that observes and records the positions of stars and planets, which are then reported in the PMC catalogs.

== Meridian circle ==
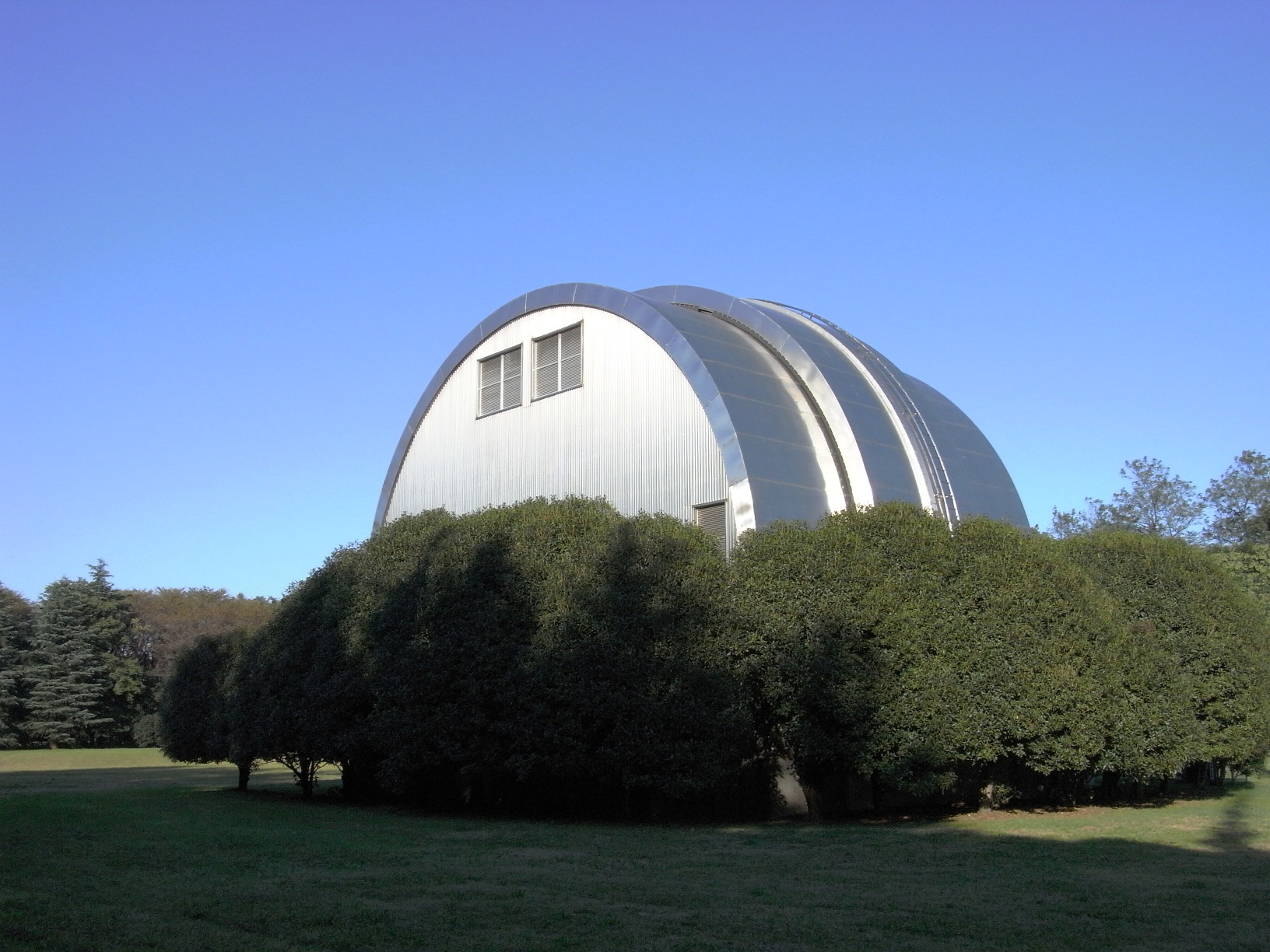
Dome of the Photoelectric Meridian Circle

The Tokyo Photoelectric Meridian Circle is a fully automated photoelectric meridian circle at the Mitaka campus of the National Astronomical Observatory of Japan (formerly of the Tokyo Astronomical Observatory) in Tokyo, Japan. It was manufactured by Carl Zeiss Oberkochen, Germany, and installed in Mitaka in 1982. The telescope is equipped with a double-slit photoelectric micrometer, a photomultiplier with a photon counting device, and a set of filters.

Systematic observations with the PMC began in December 1985 for about 33,000 stars selected from several source catalogs. The results of the observations were divided into sequential groups according to the observation years and reduced into a corresponding annual catalog. Each annual catalog contains the positions of several thousand stars. All of the annual catalogues published up to 1993 are available on request in machine-readable form, either directly from the National Astronomical Observatory of Japan or from the Centre de Données astronomiques de Strasbourg (CDS).

== List of catalogs ==
The PMC catalogues are astronomical catalogues which report the results of observations made with the Tokyo Photoelectric Meridian Circle.

- Tokyo PMC Catalog 85 (PMC85) (CDS ID: I/186)

Catalog of positions of 1007 stars observed in 1985

- Tokyo PMC Catalog 86 (PMC86) (CDS ID: I/167)

Catalog of positions of 3974 stars observed in 1986

- Tokyo PMC Catalog 87 (PMC87) (CDS ID: I/187)

Catalog of positions of 5748 stars observed in 1987

- Tokyo PMC Catalog 88 (PMC88) (CDS ID: I/188)

Catalog of positions of 3800 stars observed in 1988 and planetary positions observed in 1986 to 1988

- Tokyo PMC Catalog 89 (PMC89) (CDS ID: I/198)

Catalog of positions of 3866 stars observed in 1989

- Tokyo PMC Catalog 90-93 (PMC90-93) (CDS ID: I/248)

Catalog of positions of 6649 stars observed in 1990 through 1993

== See also ==
- Carlsberg Meridian Telescope (another 20th century electric meridian telescope)
