= Groombridge Transit Circle =

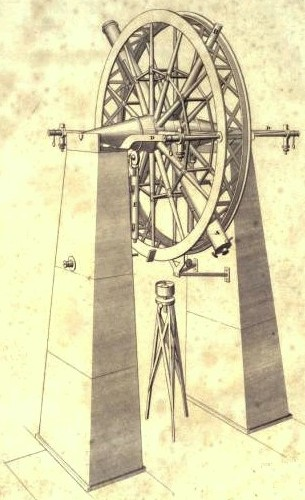
Groombridge transit circle

Groombridge Transit Circle was a meridian transit circle made by Edward Troughton for the English astronomer Stephen Groombridge in 1806, which Groombridge used to compile data for the star catalogue, Catalogue of Circumpolar Stars. The advantage of a transit circle over a mural circle (which can measure polar distances) is that it allows measuring right ascension and declination at the same time.

It had an aperture of 3.5 inches and a 5-foot focal length, mounted inside two 4 foot circles on stone piers. Groombridge used the instrument to determine the positions of over 4000 circumpolar stars.

It was eventually bought by James South, and it remained at his observatory at Kensington until 1870.

== See also ==
- Groombridge 1830
