= Groombridge 34 =

Binary star system in the constellation of Andromeda

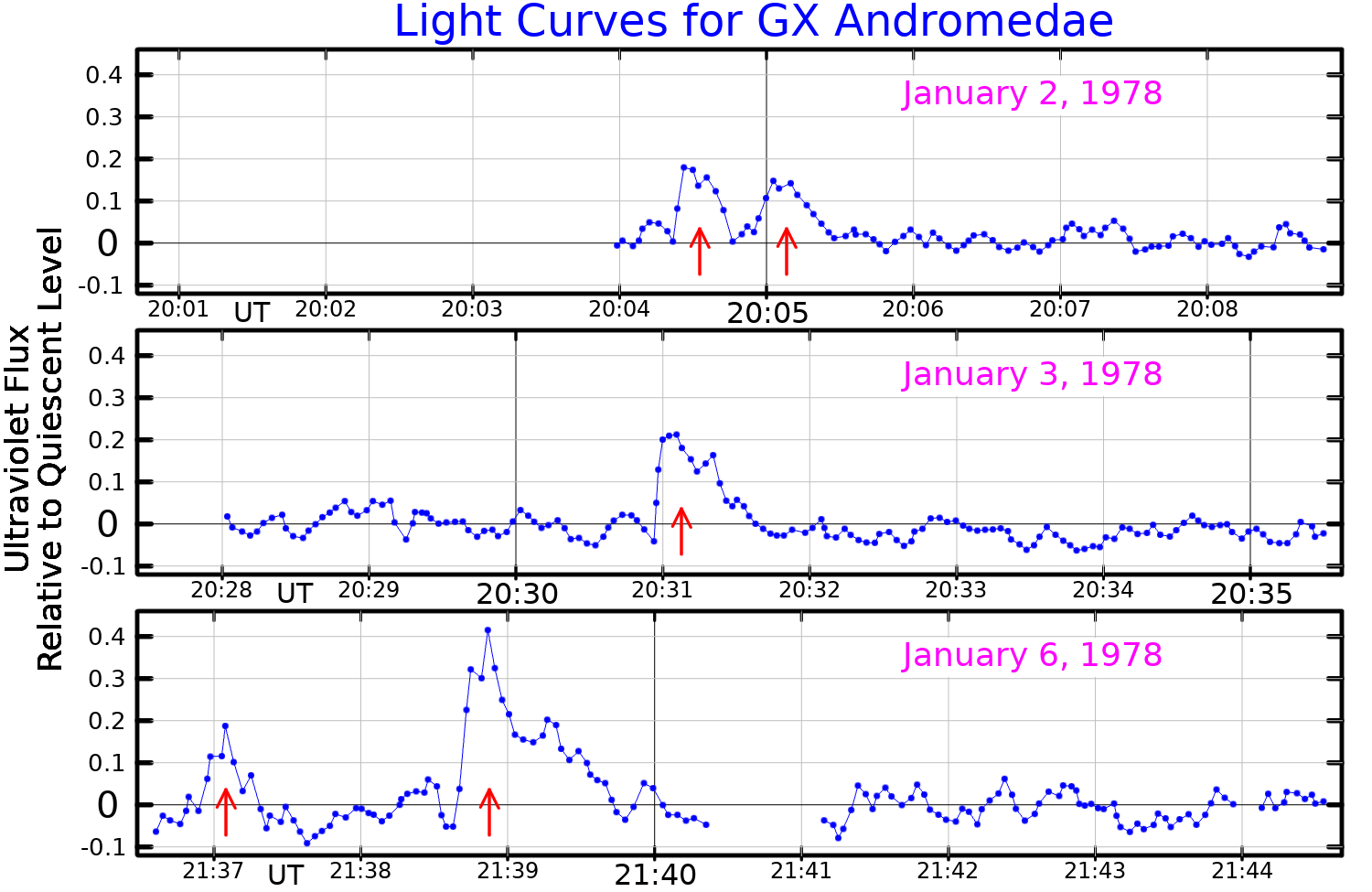
- Ultraviolet band light curves for GX Andromedae, with flares marked by red arrows. Adapted from Pettersen and Griffin (1980)

Observation data Epoch J2000 Equinox ICRS
- Constellation: Andromeda
- Groombridge 34 A
- Right ascension: 00^{h} 18^{m} 22.88498^{s}
- Declination: +44° 01′ 22.6380″
- Apparent magnitude (V): 8.119
- Groombridge 34 B
- Right ascension: 00^{h} 18^{m} 25.82514^{s}
- Declination: +44° 01′ 38.0924″
- Apparent magnitude (V): 11.007

Characteristics
- Spectral type: M1.4V + M4.1V
- U−B color index: +1.24/+1.40
- B−V color index: +1.56/+1.80
- Variable type: Flare stars

Astrometry

Groombridge 34 A
Radial velocity (R_{v})	+11.62±0.08 km/s
Proper motion (μ)	RA: 2,891.518 mas/yr Dec.: 411.832 mas/yr
Parallax (π)	280.7068±0.0203 mas
Distance	11.6191 ± 0.0008 ly (3.5624 ± 0.0003 pc)
Absolute magnitude (M_{V})	10.32

Groombridge 34 B
Radial velocity (R_{v})	10.60±0.15 km/s
Proper motion (μ)	RA: 2,862.796 mas/yr Dec.: 336.432 mas/yr
Parallax (π)	280.6947±0.0278 mas
Distance	11.620 ± 0.001 ly (3.5626 ± 0.0004 pc)
Absolute magnitude (M_{V})	13.3

Orbit
Period (P)	1,065±22 years
Semi-major axis (a)	93+42 −6 AU
Eccentricity (e)	0.73±0.01
Inclination (i)	36.7±0.7°
Longitude of the node (Ω)	254.77±1.07°
Periastron epoch (T)	2279±5
Argument of periastron (ω) (secondary)	324.7±1.6°

Details

Groombridge 34 A
Mass	0.393+0.009 −0.008 M_{☉}
Radius	0.385±0.002 R_{☉}
Luminosity	0.02249±0.00019 L_{☉}
Habitable zone inner limit	0.112 AU
Habitable zone outer limit	0.239 AU
Surface gravity (log g)	4.87±0.04 cgs
Temperature	3,601+12 −11 K
Metallicity [Fe/H]	−0.34±0.09 dex
Rotation	41.13±0.30 days
Rotational velocity (v sin i)	1.09±0.79 km/s
Age	~3.02 Gyr

Groombridge 34 B
Mass	0.15±0.02 M_{☉}
Radius	0.18±0.03 R_{☉}
Luminosity	~8.5×10^{−4} L_{☉}
Habitable zone inner limit	0.048 AU
Habitable zone outer limit	0.103 AU
Surface gravity (log g)	5.08±0.15 cgs
Temperature	3304±70 K
Metallicity [Fe/H]	−0.37±0.10 dex
Rotation	108.20±1.72 days
Age	~2.754 Gyr

Other designations
- GX/GQ Andromedae, BD+43° 44, GCTP 49, GJ 15 A/B, G 171-047/171-048, HD 1326, HIP 1475, LHS 3/4, LTT 10108/10109, SAO 36248, PPM 42798

Database references
SIMBAD	GJ 15 A
- GJ 15 Ab
- GJ 15 B
Exoplanet Archive	data
ARICNS	GJ 15 A
- GJ 15 B
- Location of Groombridge 34 in the constellation Andromeda

Groombridge 34 is a binary star system in the northern constellation of Andromeda. It was listed as entry number 34 in A Catalogue of Circumpolar Stars, published posthumously in 1838 by British astronomer Stephen Groombridge. Based upon parallax measurements taken by the Gaia spacecraft, the system is located about 11.6 light-years (3.6 parsecs) from the Sun. This positions the pair among the nearest stars to the Solar System.

Both components are small, dim red dwarf stars that are too faint to be seen with the naked eye. They orbit around their common barycenter in a fairly eccentric orbit with a separation of about 93 AU and a period of around 1,065 years. Both stars exhibit random variation in luminosity due to flares and they have been given variable star designations: the brighter member Groombridge 34 A is designated GX And, while the smaller component is designated GQ And.

The star system has a relatively high proper motion of 2.9 arc seconds per year, and is moving away from the Solar System at a velocity of 11.6 km/s. It achieved perihelion some 15,000 years ago when it came within 11 ly (3.5 pc) of the Sun.

== GX Andromedae ==
The more massive and luminous component of the pair has the variable star designation GX Andromedae. It is a main-sequence red dwarf star of spectral type M1.4 that varies its brightness due to stellar flares. Gaia observations suggest a rotation period of 44 days and a magnetic activity cycle of roughly 9 years.

== GQ Andromedae ==
The smaller companion bears the variable star name GQ Andromedae. It is a red dwarf main sequence star that undergoes flare events like the primary; it has a spectral type M4.1, so it also has a lower effective temperature.

== Planetary system ==
In August 2014, a planet orbiting around Groombridge 34 A was reported. The planet's existence was deduced from analysis of the radial velocities of the parent star by the Eta-Earth Survey using HIRES at Keck Observatory. At the time of its discovery, it was the sixth-nearest-known exoplanet.

Using the CARMENES spectrograph combined with the measurements of the HARPS and HIRES spectrographs, researchers failed to detect the purported Groombridge 34 Ab. However, they did propose that another planet (Groombridge 34 Ac, GJ 15 Ac) could be orbiting the parent star.

This discrepancy was later reconciled with new HIRES observations, covering a longer span of time, where both planets were recovered, constraining their minimum mass to 3.03 M_{🜨} for Groombridge 34 Ab and 36 M_{🜨} for Groombridge Ac. Their orbital periods are 11.4 and approximately 7,600 days, respectively. As of 2018, this system hosts the longest-period known Neptune-mass exoplanet.

The Groombridge 34 A planetary system
Companion (in order from star)	Mass	Semimajor axis (AU)	Orbital period (days)	Eccentricity	Inclination (°)	Radius
b	≥3.03+0.46 −0.44 M_{🜨}	0.072+0.003 −0.004	11.4407+0.0017 −0.0016	0.094+0.091 −0.065	—	—
c	≥36+25 −18 M_{🜨}	5.4+1.0 −0.9	7600+2200 −1700	0.27+0.28 −0.19	—	—

== See also ==
- List of nearest stars and brown dwarfs
