= Kate Groombridge =

English fashion model and actress

- Born: 8 July 1980 (age 46); Kent, England
- Occupations: Fashion model; actress
- Children: 2
- Modelling information
- Height: 5 ft 9 in (1.75 m)
- Hair colour: Light brown
- Eye colour: Hazel
- Agency: Premier Model Management

Kate Groombridge (born 8 July 1980) is an English fashion model and actress.

== Career ==
She has appeared as a cover girl in several magazines, including Esquire, Maxim and FHM, and she appeared in FHM's annual "100 sexiest women" poll.

Groombridge had a small part in the 2005 Steven Seagal film Submerged, and in September 2007 she had a larger role in the romantic comedy film Virgin Territory, playing the character Elissa. She has two further films in the can, Coffee Sex You and Shifty. Her professional agency was Premier Model Management in London
