= Edward Troughton =

Edward Troughton FRS FRSE
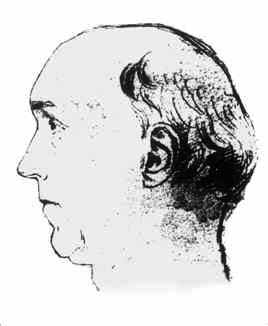
- Born: October 1753; Corney
- Died: 12 June 1835 (aged 81)
- Occupation: astronomical instrument maker
- Awards: Copley Medal

Edward Troughton (October 1753 – 12 June 1835) was a British instrument maker who was notable for making telescopes and other astronomical instruments.

== Life ==
Troughton was born at Corney, Cumberland, the youngest of six children to Francis Troughton, a husbandman on a farm, and his wife, Mary Stable. Originally raised to tend animals, Edward went to London in 1773. He then served an apprenticeship with his uncle, John Troughton (b.c.1716), alongside his elder brother, also John Troughton, and in 1779 he became his business partner. Troughton soon established himself as the top maker of navigational, surveying and astronomical instruments in Britain. They were based at 136 Fleet Street in central London. Their shop was called the "Sign of the Orrery".

In 1795 Troughton delivered what is now known as the Troughton equatorial telescope to the Armagh Observatory, a 2-inch aperture refractor telescope mounted equatorially, and its first major instrument since its founding in 1790. He created the Groombridge Transit Circle in 1806, which Stephen Groombridge used to compile his star catalogue. He did not merely build instruments, but designed and invented new ones.

Troughton was awarded the Copley Medal of the Royal Society in 1809. He was elected a Fellow of the Royal Society in March 1810, a member of the American Philosophical Society in 1817, and a Fellow of the Royal Society of Edinburgh in 1822.

In 1826, after John's death and in failing health himself, he took on William Simms as a partner, and the firm became known as Troughton & Simms.

Troughton was involved in a lawsuit against Sir James South, who was dissatisfied with the quality of an equatorial mounting that Troughton made for him. Troughton sued for payment, and with informal legal counsel provided by Richard Sheepshanks, he prevailed.

Troughton was colour blind.

He died in London on 12 June 1835 and was buried in Kensal Green Cemetery in south London. He was unmarried and had no children.

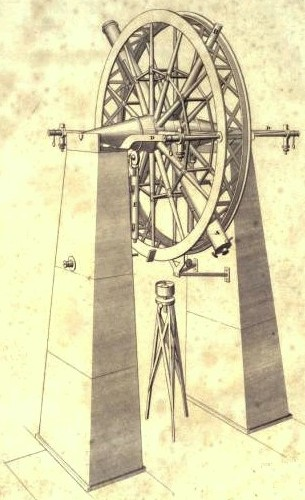
Groombridge transit circle

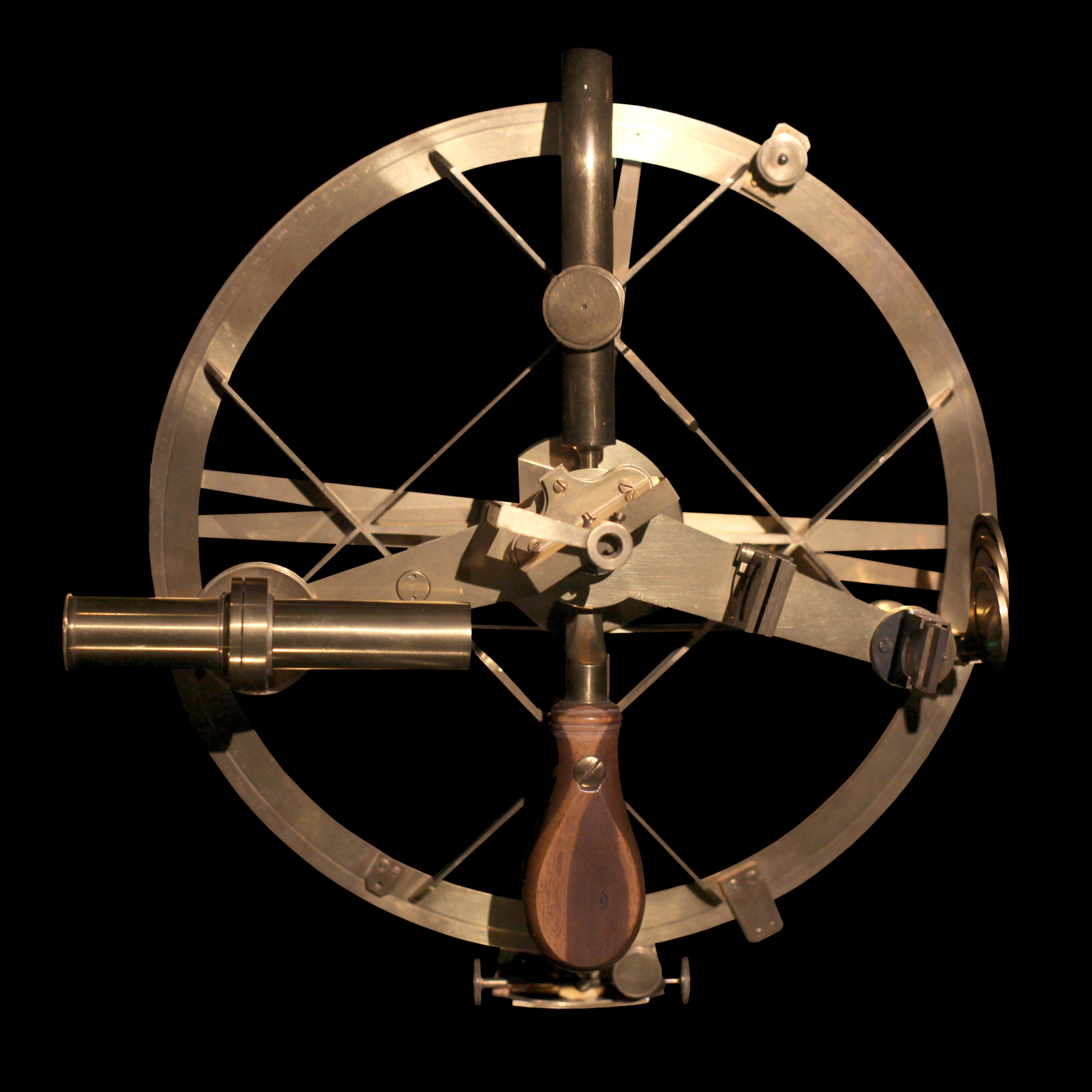
Mendoza repeating circle, made circa 1810 by Edward Troughton, London. On display at the Musée national de la Marine, Paris.

== Legacy ==
Troughton Rocks in Antarctica are named after Edward Troughton. Troughton Road near to the location of the Charlton Troughton & Simms Mathematical Instrument Works was also named after Edward Troughton.

== See also ==
- List of astronomical instrument makers
