= William Groombridge (painter) =

English painter

William Groombridge (1748–1811), was a British water-colour painter.

Groombridge first appears as an exhibitor of landscapes at the Royal Academy in 1770, and continued to exhibit up to 1790. His pictures were tinted drawings, and the smaller ones were neatly finished and well thought of. He was less successful in larger compositions. About 1780 he removed from London to Canterbury. He exhibited for the last time in 1790. He published a volume of Sonnets, London, 1789. He is included in the Biographical Dictionary of Living Authors, published in 1816.

Groombridge emigrate to the United States, coming to New York in 1793. In 1794, was among the founders of the Columbianum Art Academy that was established in Philadelphia. His wife, Catherine Groombridge, was also an artist.
