= Carlsberg Meridian Telescope =

Decommissioned telescope

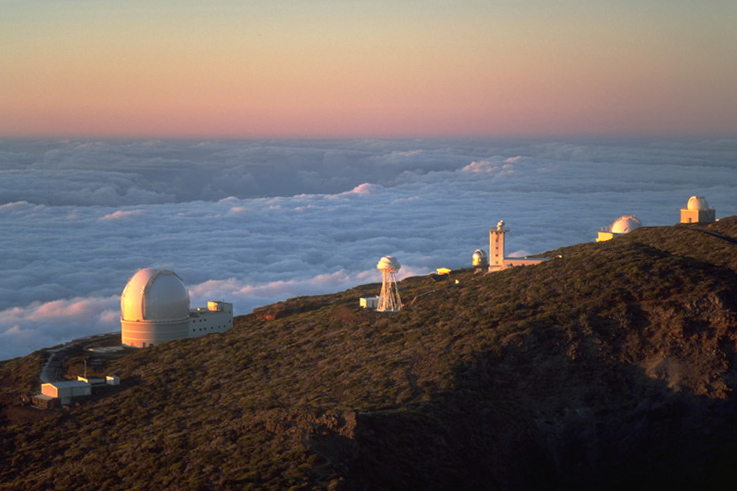
- Part of Roque de los Muchachos Observatory. The Carlsberg Meridian Telescope is housed in the low building on the bottom left.
- Location(s): Spain
- Coordinates: 28°45′36″N 17°52′57″W
- First light: May 1984
- Decommissioned: 1 September 2013
- Telescope style: refracting telescope
- Diameter: 17.8 cm (7.0 in)
- Focal length: 266 cm (8 ft 9 in)
- Website: www.ast.cam.ac.uk/ioa/research/cmt/
- Location within Canary Islands

The Carlsberg Meridian Telescope (formerly the Carlsberg Automatic Meridian Circle) is a decommissioned meridian circle telescope located at the Roque de los Muchachos Observatory in the Canary Islands. It was dedicated to high-precision optical astrometry and operated from May 1984 to September 2013.

The CMT's 20 years of photometric data was studied to understand atmosphere extinction. Up to 2003, 11 catalogs were published and it had been given various upgrades since its installation in 1984.

The telescope is owned by the Danish Copenhagen University Observatory and was jointly operated under an international agreement with the Institute of Astronomy, Cambridge and the Real Instituto y Observatorio de la Armada.

== See also ==
- Tokyo Photoelectric Meridian Circle (Another 20th century electronic meridian telescope)
