= Groombridge 1618 =

Star in the constellation Ursa Major

- Location of Groombridge 1618 in the constellation Ursa Major

Observation data Epoch J2000.0 Equinox ICRS
- Constellation: Ursa Major
- Right ascension: 10^{h} 11^{m} 22.13995^{s}
- Declination: +49° 27′ 15.2510″
- Apparent magnitude (V): +6.60

Characteristics
- Spectral type: K7.5 Ve
- U−B color index: +1.27
- B−V color index: +1.34
- Variable type: BY Dra, Flare star

Astrometry
Radial velocity (R_{v})	−26.48±0.12 km/s
Proper motion (μ)	RA: −1363.287±0.016 mas/yr Dec.: −505.770±0.020 mas/yr
Parallax (π)	205.3148±0.0224 mas
Distance	15.886 ± 0.002 ly (4.8706 ± 0.0005 pc)
Absolute magnitude (M_{V})	8.11

Details
Mass	0.670±0.033 M_{☉}
Radius	0.605±0.02 R_{☉}
Luminosity (bolometric)	0.15 L_{☉}
Habitable zone inner limit	0.398 (Note: $\scriptstyle S_{eff_{\ast}}= S_{eff_{\odot}} + aT_{\ast} + bT_{\ast}^2 + cT_{\ast}^3 + dT_{\ast}^4$ when used to calculate the stellar flux reaching the outer atmosphere of an Earth-like planet orbiting Groombridge 1618 at the Inner Habitable Zone edge - the Runaway Greenhouse limit gives a $\scriptstyle S_{eff_{\ast}}$ of 0.9397 or 93.97% the stellar flux reaching the top of Earth's atmosphere. By applying the previously calculated stellar flux and the known 15% luminosity of Groombridge 1618 into the equation, $\scriptstyle {d = {\left(\frac{{L_{\ast}}/{L_{\odot}}}{S_{eff_{\ast}}} \right)^{0.5} AU}}$, the distance of the Inner HZ - Runaway Greenhouse limit from Groombridge 1618 can be calculated as $\scriptstyle{0.4 AU}$.) au
Habitable zone outer limit	0.755 au
Surface gravity (log g)	4.51; 4.70 cgs
Temperature	3,970 K
Metallicity [Fe/H]	–0.03 dex
Rotational velocity (v sin i)	2.8 km/s
Age	6.6 Gyr

Other designations
- BD+50° 1725, GJ 380, HD 88230, HIP 49908, SAO 43223, LFT 696, IRAS 10082+4942

Database references
SIMBAD	data

Groombridge 1618 is a star in the northern constellation Ursa Major. With an apparent visual magnitude of +6.6, it lies at or below the threshold of stars visible to the naked eye for an average observer. It is relatively close to Earth, at 15.89 light-years (4.87 pc). This is a main sequence star of spectral type K7.5 Ve, having just 67% of the Sun's mass.

== Properties ==
This star was first identified as entry 1618 in the work A Catalog of Circumpolar Stars by Stephen Groombridge published posthumously in 1838. Its large proper motion across the sky suggested that it was relatively nearby and made it an early candidate for parallax measurements. In 1884 the parallax angle was measured as 0″.322 ± 0″.023, which is larger than the modern value of 0″.205.

Groombridge 1618 has a stellar classification of K8 V, which means it is a K-type main sequence star that is generating energy by fusing hydrogen at its core. It has 67% of the mass of the Sun, 61% of the Sun's radius, but radiates only 15% of the Sun's energy and only 4.6% of the Sun's energy in the visible light spectrum. The effective surface temperature of the star's photosphere is about 4,000 K, giving it an orange hue.

It is a BY Draconis variable with a surface magnetic field strength of 750 G. The chromosphere is relatively inactive and produces star spots comparable to Sun spots. However, like UV Ceti, it has been observed to undergo increases in luminosity as a flare star.

== Search for planets ==
A search for excess infrared emission from this star by the Infrared Space Observatory came up negative, implying that Groombridge 1618 does not possess a nearby debris disk (such as Vega does). However, observations using the Herschel Space Observatory showed a small excess suggesting a low-temperature debris disk. The data can be modeled by a ring of coarse, highly-reflective dust at a temperature below 22 K orbiting at least 51 AU from the host star. If this star does have a companion, astrometric measurements appear to place an upper bound of 3–12 times the mass of Jupiter on such a hypothetical object (for orbital periods in the range of 5–50 years).

Observations collated by Marcy & Benitz (1989), tend towards a single notable object with periodicity of 122 days as a planetary object with minimum mass 4 times that of Jupiter. This candidate planet was never confirmed and the signal the authors had found could have been due to intrinsic stellar activity. If confirmed, the planet would be within the star's habitable zone.

An examination of this system in 2010 using the MMT telescope fitted with adaptive optics failed to detect a planetary companion.

The habitable zone for this star, defined where liquid water could be present on an Earth-like planet, is at a radius of 0.26–0.56 AU, where 1 AU is the average distance from the Earth to the Sun.

The star is among five nearby K-type stars of a type in a 'sweet spot’ between Sun-analog stars and M stars for the likelihood of evolved life, per analysis of Giada Arney from NASA’s Goddard Space Flight Center.

== See also ==
- Stephen Groombridge
- List of nearest stars
- List of nearest K-type stars
