= Stephen Groombridge =

British merchant and astronomer

Stephen Groombridge FRS
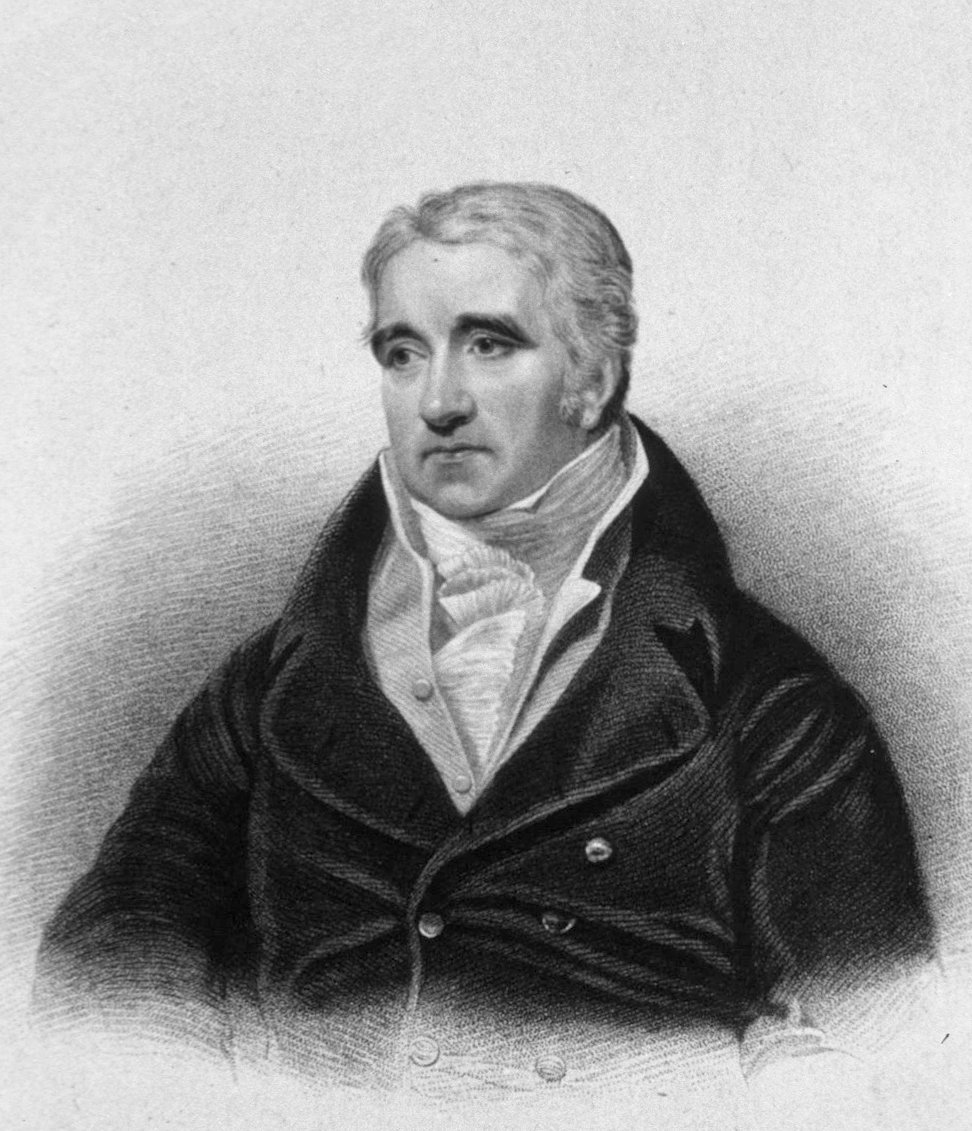
- Born: 7 January 1755; Goudhurst in Kent, England
- Died: 30 March 1832 (aged 77); Blackheath, London, England
- Occupations: merchant and astronomer
- Known for: compiling a star catalogue of stars down to eighth or ninth magnitude

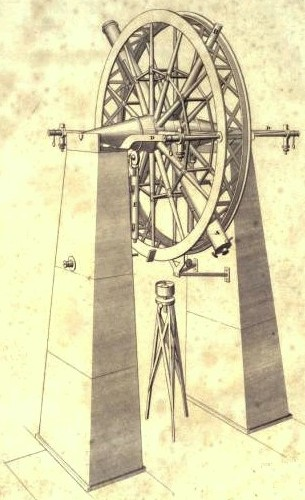
Transit circle of Stephen Groombridge

Stephen Groombridge FRS (7 January 1755 – 30 March 1832) was a British merchant and astronomer.

== Life ==
He was born at Goudhurst in Kent on 7 January 1755. He succeeded when about 21 to the business in West Smithfield of a linen draper named Greenland, to whom he had been apprenticed. Later, and until 1816, he was a successful West India merchant. He lived mainly at Goudhurst, where he built a small observatory; but moved to Blackheath in 1802.

In 1806, using a then new transit circle built by Edward Troughton, he began compiling a star catalogue of stars down to about eighth or ninth magnitude. He spent ten years making observations on the Groombridge Transit Circle and another ten years doing reductions of the data (correcting for refraction, instrument error and clock error). In 1827 he suffered a "severe attack of paralysis" from which he never fully recovered. Others continued the work, continuing with corrections for aberration and nutation among others.

Groombridge died in Blackheath. His Catalogue of Circumpolar Stars was published posthumously in 1838 with the help of fellow astronomer George Biddell Airy and others. An earlier edition had been published in 1833 but was found to contain errors and was withdrawn. In 1842, one of the stars in his catalogue, Groombridge 1830, was discovered by Friedrich Wilhelm Argelander to have a very high proper motion. For many decades its proper motion was the highest known; today it still occupies third place.

== Selected writings ==
- Groombridge, Stephen (1838). A Catalogue of Circumpolar Stars. London: John Murray.- edited by George Biddell Airy; has biographical information for Groombridge

== See also ==
- 5657 Groombridge, an asteroid named in his honour
- Groombridge 1618, a nearby star
- Groombridge 34, a double star. The 16th nearest star system
