= Ariel Kleiman =

Australian film director and screenwriter

Ariel Kleiman is an Australian director and filmmaker based in London. He is known for his first feature film, Partisan (2015) and the second season of the Star Wars television series Andor (2025).

== Early life and education ==
Ariel Kleiman was born to a Jewish family in Melbourne, Australia; his parents emigrated from Odesa, Ukraine, in the 1970s.

He graduated from the Victorian College of the Arts in 2010, where he studied film and television.

== Works ==
Kleiman's second-year film school film, Young Love, premiered at the Sundance Film Festival in 2010. That same year it was showcased in McSweeney's's DVD quarterly, Wholphin.

In May 2010 Kleiman's graduation film, Deeper Than Yesterday, premiered at Cannes Film Festival's, Semaine de la Critique. In 2011, he shot his first commercial, called "Marked for Life", for the Dutch charity SIRE.

In 2015, Kleiman released a full-length film, Partisan, a thriller about child assassins, which was meant to star American actor Oscar Isaac but instead starred French actor Vincent Cassel.

Kleiman also directed the eighth episode of the Showtime drama series Yellowjackets, titled "Flight of the Bumblebee". Cast member Melanie Lynskey said "Flight of the Bumblebee" was her favorite episode to film because Kleiman allowed the cast to "play around" and improvise several scenes.

In 2022, Kleiman was announced as a director for numerous episodes of the second season of the Star Wars television series Andor. (Note: Episodes one through six) This season was released in 2025.

== Awards and nominations ==
Young Love was awarded an Honorable Mention in Short Film Making at the 2010 Sundance Film Festival.

In May 2010 Deeper Than Yesterday was awarded the Kodak Discovery Award For Best Short Film at Cannes. It went on to win best film prizes at over 20 film festivals, from Leeds to Beijing, including 2011 Sundance Film Festival, where it won the Jury Prize in International Filmmaking.

Also in 2010, Kleiman won the SOYA Qantas Spirit of Youth award and Inside Film Rising Talent award.

In 2012 Kleiman's first feature film script won the Sundance Mahindra Global Filmmaking award and was selected for the Sundance Directors & Writers Labs. The film was expected to begin production in 2013.

== Personal life ==
As of 2011, Kleiman was living in London.
