= Rosalind Halstead =

English actress and model (born 1984)

- Born: 18 July 1984 (age 42); London, England
- Occupations: Actress; model

Rosalind Halstead (born 18 July 1984) is a British actress, model and former ballet dancer from London.

== Early life ==
Halstead was born in London. As a youth, she trained for five years at the Central School of Ballet, and danced at Sadler's Wells Theatre. Her performance career began at the North London Performing Arts Centre at the age of eight.

By the age of 13, Halstead was scouted by the Select Modelling Agency, and was a model for some years before becoming an actress.

== Career ==
She appeared in the 2005 film Mrs Henderson Presents. The same year Halstead was cast in David Leland's Virgin Territory (originally titled The Decameron) which was produced by Dino De Laurentis. In 2007 she appeared in the recurring role of Kelly Short on the British television series Nearly Famous.

In 2009, she appeared as Isabella in a televised adaptation of Wuthering Heights on ITV. In 2010, she appeared in the BBC comedy series How Not To Live Your Life playing a homeless woman who begins dating Don, the show's central character.

In 2014 Halstead joined the cast of the Syfy fantasy television series Dominion during its first season, playing the role of Sen. Becca Thorn.

== Filmography ==
=== Film ===
| Year | Title | Role | Notes |
|---|---|---|---|
| 2004 | Bridget Jones: The Edge of Reason | Receptionist | |
| 2005 | Mrs Henderson Presents | Frances | |
| 2007 | Elizabeth: The Golden Age | Second Court Lady | |
| 2007 | Virgin Territory | Filomena | |
| 2018 | DJ | Miranda | |

=== Television ===
| Year | Title | Role | Notes |
|---|---|---|---|
| 2003 | Sons & Lovers | Pretty Girl | Television film |
| 2005 | Love Soup | Rochelle Tandy | Episode: "The Reflecting Pool" |
| 2006 | Berry's Way | Jenny | Television film |
| 2007 | Nearly Famous | Kelly Short | Recurring role, 5 episodes |
| 2009 | Wuthering Heights | Isabella | Television miniseries |
| 2009 | The Day of the Triffids | Cordelia | Television miniseries |
| 2010 | How Not to Live Your Life | Susan | Episode: "Don Dates a Homeless" |
| 2011 | The Fades | Sarah | Episode: Unaired pilot |
| 2011 | Rage of the Yeti | Lynda | Television film (Syfy) |
| 2012 | Sherlock | Kate | Episode: "A Scandal in Belgravia" |
| 2013 | Endeavour | Estella Broom | Episode: "Rocket" |
| 2014 | Dominion | Senator Becca Thorn | Main role (season 1) |
| 2016 | Stan Lee's Lucky Man | Gina Pursey | Episode: "The Last Chance" |
| 2016 | Agatha Raisin | Cecilia | Episode: "The Vicious Vet" |
| 2018 | Strangers | Emma | Recurring role (season 2) |
| 2019 | Holby City | Bea Kaminsky | Recurring role, 5 episodes |
| 2019–2020 | The Trial of Christine Keeler | Bronwyn | Recurring role |
| 2022 | Shakespeare & Hathaway: Private Investigators | Ophelia Skylark | Episode: "Too Much of Water" |
| 2022, 2025 | Star Wars: Andor | Runai Sculdun | 6 episodes |
