= Mon Mothma =

Star Wars character

- Star Wars character
- Genevieve O'Reilly as Mon Mothma in Andor (2022)
- First appearance: Return of the Jedi; 1983
- Last appearance: "Jedha, Kyber, Erso"; Andor; 2025
- Created by: George Lucas; Lawrence Kasdan
- Portrayed by: Genevieve O'Reilly (Revenge of the Sith, Rogue One, Andor, and Ahsoka); Caroline Blakiston (Return of the Jedi)
- Voiced by: Kath Soucie (The Clone Wars); Genevieve O'Reilly (Rebels)

In-universe information
- Gender: Female
- Occupation: Senator from Chandrila; General and Commander-in-Chief of the Rebel Alliance; Chancellor of the New Republic
- Affiliation: Galactic Republic; Galactic Empire; Rebel Alliance; New Republic
- Spouse: Perrin Fertha
- Children: Leida Mothma (daughter) (Note: Mon's daughter's name is spelled "Lieda" in the Legends continuity.); Legends: Jobin Mothma (son)
- Relatives: Vel Sartha (cousin)
- Homeworld: Chandrila

Mon Mothma is a fictional character in the Star Wars universe, primarily portrayed by Genevieve O'Reilly. Introduced as the leader of the Rebel Alliance in Return of the Jedi (1983), in which she is played by Caroline Blakiston, Mon has become a prominent character in subsequent prequel media, including the film Rogue One (2016), the animated series The Clone Wars (2010) and Star Wars Rebels (2017–2018), and particularly the live-action television series Andor (2022–2025), where she plays a central role. The character also appeared in the 2023 live-action television series Ahsoka, again portrayed by O'Reilly, her first time playing the character in media chronologically set after Return of the Jedi.

== Character ==
=== Portrayals ===
One of only four female characters with dialogue in the original three Star Wars films, Mon Mothma was portrayed by Caroline Blakiston in Return of the Jedi (1983). In 1997, Blakiston said of the supporting role, "Certainly people are always very envious of me. When I join a new theater company, the other actors look down the program, see my Return of the Jedi credit and say, 'Oh, you were part of Star Wars.' I smile and say, 'Yes, but only for twenty-six and a half seconds.'"

Star Wars creator George Lucas cast Genevieve O'Reilly as Mon in the 2005 prequel film Revenge of the Sith, but most of her scenes were ultimately cut from the theatrical release of the film. In advance of the role, O'Reilly studied Blakiston's 1983 performance. She said, "I remember studying the scene, really trying to work on capturing her voice, her syntax, so that fans could see a connectedness between me playing her and Caroline playing her." O'Reilly reprised the role in the 2016 prequel film Rogue One, and voiced the character in five episodes of the animated series Star Wars Rebels – "Secret Cargo", "Zero Hour: Part 1", "In the Name of the Rebellion: Part 1", "The Occupation", and "Crawler Commandeers" – in 2017. She portrayed Mon again, this time as a lead character, in the live-action 2022 television series Andor. O'Reilly noted in 2022 that Blakiston's performance continually influences her own. She said, "I was always interested in her, and each time I go to play her, I go back to that scene. You can see when Caroline does that in that scene, for me, there was always a pain at the heart of it. You could see that she was carrying a pain, and I was really curious about what that was. What has happened in this woman's life? What has it cost to be her? What are the sacrifices that she has had to make along the way to be that leader of a rebellion?" In expanding the character for Andor, O'Reilly drew from various real-life female politicians, including Liz Cheney, Alexandria Ocasio-Cortez, Jacinda Ardern and Angela Merkel.

Kath Soucie voiced Mon Mothma in three episodes of the animated series The Clone Wars – "Senate Murders", "Heroes on Both Sides", and "Pursuit of Peace" – in 2010.

=== Description ===
Initially, Mon Mothma is the senator from the planet Chandrila during the last years before the fall of the Galactic Republic. A leader and outspoken voice of the Galactic Senate's Loyalist faction, she pushes back against the increasing overreach of Supreme Chancellor Palpatine's policies and the subtle subjugation of the galaxy's citizens. Finding herself fighting a losing battle, Mon ultimately leaves the Senate and founds the Rebel Alliance against Palpatine's rising Galactic Empire, ultimately uniting the emerging Rebel factions into a singular unit. Under her leadership as the Chancellor and Commander-in-Chief of the Rebel Alliance, the Rebels destroy both iterations of the Empire's planet-destroying weapon known as the Death Star, and eventually bring down the Empire itself. Mon subsequently serves as Chancellor of the New Republic, moving the seat of government from Coruscant to Chandrila. She later advocates that it be periodically rotated among different worlds. Mon's policies spark the rise of two opposing factions within the Senate: the Populists, who support the autonomy of individual planets and systems, and the Centrists, who believe a stronger central government is necessary. She later steps down as Chancellor due to illness.

Amy Ratcliffe of Nerdist News described the character as "continually a beacon of serenity. Calm and measured, Mon Mothma is a steady hand that the entire Rebel Alliance, and later the New Republic, can grasp for support. She has a hard edge to her; she has to, in order to carry the weight she does. But she only shows it when necessary." O'Reilly said that Mon is a "genuine humanitarian", has a "strong moral compass", and is a "critical thinker" and a "considered decision maker". O'Reilly added, "Early on when we met her, when she was much younger, we didn't really see her taking action. We see her listening a lot, we see her gathering a lot of information ... these were foundation moments for that character and it informed her behavior with the rebels group." Ratcliffe wrote that Mon's appearances prior to Star Wars Rebels have "painted a quiet portrait of the character. She's careful. She listens. She has strength, to be sure, but we don't see it outwardly illustrated like [we do in Rebels]". In that series, Mon realizes that she cannot effectively fight the Emperor from the Senate, and boldly calls him a "lying executioner" in public. The comic Star Wars #28 (October 2022), set after the events of The Empire Strikes Back (1980), shows Mon's unflinching reaction to the news that the Empire is building a second Death Star. Her confidence that the Rebels can destroy this one as they did the first makes Mon a character that Adrian Quidilla of Screen Rant called "the beacon of hope that guides the Rebel Alliance." O'Reilly said, "The iterations that we found her in, both in Rebels and in Rogue One, were similar: a leader of a rebellion with a tough decision. It requires a dignity and a strength, which is at the heart, I think, of Mon Mothma."

Andor creator Tony Gilroy noted that in previous appearances, Mon is "presented as very proper and sober and perfectly put together all the time". He called Mon "sort of a Nancy Pelosi character ... She's kind of trying to do good ... and she's losing". He noted, "She a powerful presence in the Senate but she's facing defeat after defeat after defeat as the Empire is taking over". O'Reilly said, "I think she has been a woman who really believes in diplomacy, really believes in the power of a democratic chamber, for everyone to have a voice. I believe, with the encroachment of Empire and Palpatine, she has believed that she could still effect change from within. That she could make a difference, that chambers of parliament, for want of a better word, can breed allies, and can create effective opposition, diplomatically. I think when we meet her in Andor, she's at the end of that line. O'Reilly explained, "She's been fighting this fight for a long time. And I feel like she's been getting nowhere ... It is a wall of power and oppression in front of her that she is tired of fighting." Zosha Millan of Polygon compared Mon to series hero Cassian Andor (Diego Luna) in that they are both fighting against the Empire to give regular people better lives, but in different ways. While he pushes back against any authority figure, she has been trying to effect change from within the very power structures he resists, with little success. O'Reilly explained, "Now she has to go outside structure. She has to risk, she has to enter a dangerous environment. And she really has to put her own beliefs on the line ... You see a woman put her life on the line in a very different way than Cassian is putting his life on the line."

In Andor, Mon's efforts to finance and build the Rebel Alliance are paramount, even at the expense of her family. After some resistance, she agrees to commence the Chandrilan courtship process between her daughter and the son of shady banker Davo Sculdun (Richard Dillane) in exchange for his assistance with her financial machinations. Mon also sets up her husband to take the fall should the Empire notice the discrepancies in her accounts.

== Appearances ==
=== Film ===
==== Return of the Jedi (1983) ====
Caroline Blakiston as Mon Mothma in Return of the Jedi (1983)

Mon Mothma is introduced in Return of the Jedi (1983) as the leader of the Rebel Alliance against the Empire, portrayed by Caroline Blakiston. As the Rebels prepare to assault the Empire's second Death Star, Mon notes that "many Bothans died" to bring information about the Death Star to the Rebel Alliance. In 2022, Genevieve O'Reilly said, "[Star Wars creator] George Lucas wrote this female leader back in the 1980s. That is to be respected and to be celebrated." She added, "I think that was as ambitious then—perhaps even more ambitious—than it is now."

==== Revenge of the Sith (2005) ====
A younger Mon is featured in scenes shot with O'Reilly for the 2005 prequel film Revenge of the Sith, but most were ultimately cut from the theatrical release of the film. Corey Larson of Screen Rant argued that this was done because "the movie's political aspects needed to be shaved down considerably in order to make the film more palatable in the theater." O'Reilly said:

George Lucas and Rick McCallum, who was the producer, they're such pros, they wrote to me and told me [the scenes had been cut], so I knew way before. And they were so beautiful about that and kind to me as a very young actor. And it made complete sense to me, because of course it was all about Darth Vader becoming Darth Vader. Cinema has to have a singular focus for it to drive, you know? Cinema doesn't have a lot of time to tell the story. So I respected their decision, and when I watched it, it made total sense.

In a deleted scene from the film, Mon secretly meets with senators Bail Organa of Alderaan (Jimmy Smits) and Padmé Amidala of Naboo (Natalie Portman) during the last days of the Galactic Republic. Mon explains, "We are not Separatists trying to leave the Republic. We are loyalists trying to preserve democracy in the Republic." The group discusses Palpatine's growing authoritarianism, and how to counter it, in what would be the seed of the rebellion against the Empire.

==== Rogue One (2016) ====
In Rogue One (2016), Mon Mothma (O'Reilly) and senator Bail Organa (Smits) are Rebel leaders who enlist Jyn Erso (Felicity Jones), a young renegade woman sent to a work camp for her crimes against the Empire, to help identify and extract her father, scientist Galen Erso (Mads Mikkelsen), from Imperial confinement. Mon intends Galen to testify before the Senate and confirm the existence of the Death Star. He is killed during the extraction, but Jyn joins the dangerous mission to acquire the plans to the Death Star from the Imperial archive on Scarif. The success of this mission leads directly to the events of the originating 1977 film, Star Wars.

=== Animated series ===
==== The Clone Wars (2010) ====
Kath Soucie voiced Mon Mothma in three 2010 episodes of the animated series The Clone Wars. In "Senate Murders", "Heroes on Both Sides" and "Pursuit of Peace", supporting character Mon is an ally of fellow senators Bail Organa (Phil LaMarr) and Padmé Amidala (Catherine Taber). She makes her opposition to the war with the Separatists "her defining campaign promise", and even attempts to reach out to the Separatist Senate in "Heroes on Both Sides."

==== Star Wars Rebels (2017) ====
O'Reilly voiced Mon Mothma in five 2017 episodes of the animated series Star Wars Rebels, set a couple of years before the events of Rogue One. She said, "I had finished filming Rogue One, and they rang and asked if I would I like to be involved in Rebels. I was thrilled. It was such an extraordinary thing to be a part of and to work with the team at Lucasfilm ... I would meet them via satellite link-up from wherever I was ... It was such a treat to step in at a different point in their storytelling." O'Reilly explained that Mon comes into the series in a "highly charged time" in which the "stakes are high for everybody", and noted that the character "really shows the traits of a true leader in very difficult, very heightened, dangerous times."

In "Secret Cargo", the crew of the Rebel ship Ghost finds themselves secretly transporting Mon Mothma, who is being hunted by the Empire after speaking out publicly against Palpatine. She resigns from the Senate, calling for those who oppose the Emperor to join her in opposition. Ships begin to appear over Dantooine as the Rebel Alliance is formed. Rebel fighter Ezra Bridger petitions Mon Mothma to send reinforcements to thwart Imperial Grand Admiral Thrawn's assault on the rebel base on Atollon in "Zero Hour: Part 1". Refusing, Mon points out that it is too soon for the Rebels to openly battle the Empire, and doing so would, as Thrawn surely intends, decimate their growing forces. In "In the Name of the Rebellion: Part 1", the Rebel Alliance receives valuable intel from extremist Saw Gerrera, but Mon makes it clear she does not condone Saw's unscrupulous methods. He later confronts Mon via hologram, accusing the Rebel Alliance of being too spineless to win against the Empire. Mon insists that Saw's tendency to target civilians, kill surrendering enemies and break every rule of engagement are things the Empire would do. In "The Occupation", Mon informs the Ghost crew that the Empire is testing a new kind of TIE Defender, and sends the team to Lothal for reconnaissance. In "Crawler Commandeers", Mon approves a plan for Hera Syndulla and her team to attack an Imperial TIE Defender factory on Lothal.

=== Live-action television ===
==== Andor (2022) ====
In 2022, O'Reilly reprised the role of Mon Mothma in the live-action television series Andor, set five years before the events of the 2016 film Rogue One. Andor is centered on smuggler and future rebel Cassian Andor (Diego Luna), and Mon Mothma first appears in the fourth episode, "Aldhani". Dalton Ross of Entertainment Weekly wrote of Mon's inclusion, "[We] are finally seeing this classic original trilogy character ... fleshed out beyond mere Rebellion briefings and interviews in Return of the Jedi and Rogue One. Larson called her appearance in Andor "by far—the most demanding role of the character seen yet", and noted that "almost none of what Mothma does in Andor is what it seems".

===== Development =====
O'Reilly said of Andor's portrayal of Mon, "We really get to develop her as a character, and we get to learn about her not just as a senator, but as a woman. [We learn] what her life is like, what she has to wrestle with, what are the dangers to her life, what it costs to be her." Gilroy said of the character, "She's always presented as very proper and sober and perfectly put together all the time in canon, and it just seemed like that was such a perfect opportunity to say, 'Well what's really going on behind here?' It was very exciting to take a sort of still portrait of someone and throw it away and build a real life behind it. She has a much, much, much more complicated life [than] anybody was ever aware." O'Reilly said it has been an "extraordinary gift" from Gilroy to be able to explore "not just the role of the senator or the leader, but the woman behind that—who she is, what that is, what she has to sacrifice, what she has to risk, what the cost is to her, what this rebellion is to her." She explained, "We meet a woman who looks different than we've seen her before, who feels different, who certainly dresses different. When she walks in, you can see the power that she wields. But within a couple of minutes ... it shifts dramatically to reveal a private face that we've not encountered before. You see that she's under threat. You see that she's in danger. You see that she's taking risks."

O'Reilly added, "We meet a woman steeped in empire, navigating a very male-dominated empire with a very powerful Emperor Palpatine at the top of it. We've seen her surrounded by people... maybe with different opinions, but like-minded rebels. We find her in Andor very alone, living in a world of orthodoxy and construct. We see a woman who has had to navigate her ideals and beliefs within systems of oppression." O'Reilly said that Gilroy wanted to explore the rules and constructs that Mon, who has been married and a senator since she was 16 years old, has had to navigate within during the intervening 14 years. She asked, "What is that cage?" O'Reilly explained that Andor presents Mon as a "deeply complicated woman" who "might make compromising choices that we haven't seen before." Being set five years before the events of Rogue One allows the series "to discover where this woman goes, and how she navigates the dangers and the risks that is her life, and how she ends up in a world where she introduces Cassian Andor to Jyn Erso." She warned that the second season would take Mon in a "devastating storyline".

In the series, Mon has an elevated wardrobe and hairstyle from previous appearances. O'Reilly said, "We wanted to meet her at a new stage, a stage we hadn't seen before. And so, you meet a very successful, political woman ... she is successful, she is sophisticated, she is a political mover, she is living within a world of high society. So, we wanted her look to reflect that. It's five years before she's in a bunker, you know?" She added, "What Tony [Gilroy] has done is write a character ... in a polar opposite moment of their life to Rogue One, so we have somewhere to go. So, why not meet her in an art gallery, in beautiful clothes, flown in on this extraordinary car and navigating this sophisticated, but deceptive, life?"

===== Storylines =====
In Andor, Mon is an embattled senator from Chandrila, fighting against the increased overreach of the Imperial regime. Watched closely by agents of the Imperial Security Bureau (ISB), she is secretly raising funds for the nascent Rebel Alliance. Andor also introduces Mon's disaffected husband Perrin Fertha (Alastair Mackenzie) and daughter Leida Mothma (Bronte Carmichael). Vel Sartha (Faye Marsay), an active member of the Rebel Alliance in the field, is revealed to be Mon's cousin in "Nobody's Listening!". Gilroy said, "Of all the people that walk through this show and face all kinds of decisions and problems and pressures and the hiding and chasing and betrayal—[Mon] has to stand out almost in the open for the whole show, in a really dangerous position. In many ways her story is the most tense story in the whole show, because she has to do everything in the open."

In "Aldhani", Senator Mon Mothma meets with antiques dealer Luthen Rael (Stellan Skarsgård) on Coruscant, ostensibly looking for a gift for her husband. Luthen, however, runs a network of rebels quietly fighting against the Empire, and Mon is funding his efforts. Restricted by Imperial policies and suspecting that she is being watched by the Imperial Security Bureau, Mon is having increased difficulty accessing and moving money, and they both face challenges in keeping their opposition to the Empire hidden. At home, Mon's husband Perrin has invited some of her opponents in the Senate to their dinner party. He does not share her sense of urgency regarding the Empire's rising power, and is dismissive of how seriously she takes it. O'Reilly said that the episode "exposes how much of Empire is also within the marriage, and how far she has to go to fight for what she really believes in. She has to lose a lot, because her husband is Empire. Perhaps her life is Empire. She has to escape it, right? Or she has to risk stuff. And she ends up in that rebel bunker." She noted that though Mon's passions are expressed in her encounter with Luthen, at home she must put on the armor of her political persona.

In "The Axe Forgets", Mon establishes a new charitable foundation while managing increasingly tense relations with her husband and daughter, who are annoyed by her devotion to her work. Mon's protests to the Senate about the Empire's treatment of the planet Ghorman fall on deaf ears in "The Eye". In "Announcement", Mon learns that Luthen was involved in the recent robbery of an Imperial base on Aldhani. Though fearful of the inevitable Imperial crackdown, she understands it is time to step up efforts against the Empire. Mon also reunites with banker Tay Kolma (Ben Miles), a childhood friend from Chandrila, and enlists him to help her funnel her family funds to the Rebellion without detection. In "Narkina 5", Mon attempts to collect votes to oppose new Imperial legislation, which Tay agrees is having a chilling effect. He warns Mon that the Empire's new banking laws are making it more difficult to move money surreptitiously. Mon's daughter Leida remarks how often Tay has been visiting. At a banquet, Mon explains to her guests that she and Perrin were married at 16, per Chandrilan custom, around the same time she became a senator.

Mon addresses the Senate to criticize the Empire's new directives in "Nobody's Listening!", but is met with opposition. She reunites with Vel, revealed as her cousin, and encourages her to keep a low profile while maintaining the facade of a rich and politically uninvolved young woman. Tay alerts Mon that one large transaction she has made may put her in jeopardy should the authorities examine her accounts. He suggests she cover the amount with a loan from shady Chandrilan banker Davo Sculdun (Richard Dillane), whom she calls a thug. Mon meets with Davo in "One Way Out", and he offers to help her facilitate her clandestine financial transactions. His price for the assistance is for Mon to arrange a meeting between her daughter and his son, an initial step towards marriage in Mon and Davo's Chandrilan culture. Horrified at the idea of a child betrothal for Leida, like Mon's own, Mon declines the offer. In "Daughter of Ferrix", Mon and Vel are uncomfortable with Leida's interest in Chandrilan courtship rituals. Mon laments to Vel the danger she is in concerning missing funds in her accounts. Mon admits she is considering a solution that would require her to use Leida as a bargaining chip. Mon's daughter Leida and Davo's son Stekan (Finley Glasgow) are formally introduced in "Rix Road". To create a cover story for the missing funds, Mon stages an argument in front of her driver Kloris (Lee Ross), who she knows is an ISB spy, suggesting that Perrin has gambled the money away. Kloris reports the conversation to ISB supervisor Blevin (Ben Bailey Smith).

In the first three-episode block of the second season beginning with "One Year Later" and ending with "Harvest", she is on Chandrila attending Leida's arranged marriage to Stekan. She is surprised to see Luthen and Kleya Marki at the wedding, both having been invited by Davo. Tay Kolma approaches Mon to set a time to "catch up" on an unspecified subject, later revealing that his business has gone sour, his wife left him, and that he wishes instead to discuss their funding of the Rebellion. Mon is suddenly called away to console Leida, who is distraught over Stekan's unwillingness to hold her hand. During "Sagrona Teema", Tay reveals to Mon that rebel activity has hurt his investments and that he feels "undervalued" and attempts to blackmail her with her involvement. She later brings up the possibility of his defection with Luthen, who suggests that they should gauge his price for keeping silent about the Rebellion. In "Harvest", on the day of Leida's wedding, Mon tells her of her own wedding day to her daughter and assures her that she does not need to go through with the marriage if she does not want to, but Leida rebuffs her and the wedding goes as planned. During the reception, Mon assures Tay that they will discuss his financial troubles the following week, but Luthen reasons that no price to pay for Tay's silence will ever be enough. He implies to a horrified Mon that Tay needs to be killed to avoid becoming a liability, later assigning Cinta Kaz (Varada Sethu) to pose as Tay's driver and assassinate him. Distressed at both having consented to Tay's death and her failure at being unable to talk Leida out of a loveless marriage, she numbs herself with alcohol and dances drunkenly with the other party guests.

In "Ever Been to Ghorman?", Mon continues campaigning to support the Ghor people against the Empire's smear campaign and attempts to gain the support of Ghorman senator Dasi Oran (Raphael Roger Levy). However, he is unwilling to provoke Emperor Palpatine's wrath by opposing him. In "What a Festive Evening", she attends Davo's investiture party that was first mentioned in the previous episode "I Have Friends Everywhere", where she has a heated debate with Orson Krennic (Ben Mendelsohn). In the following episode "Messenger", she and her aide Erskin Semaj (Pierro Niel-Mee) meet with senator Oran, who thanks Mon for her support but admits that Imperial presence is too strong and the situation too dangerous.

In "Welcome to the Rebellion", after the events of "Who Are You?" in which Ghorman protesters were slaughtered, she and Bail Organa (Benjamin Bratt) watch as Oran is arrested and the Ghorman Massacre framed as an insurrection. Recognizing that meaningful change from within the Empire is impossible, Bail and Mon converse while she insists that they publicly condemn these actions, but Bail chooses to stay on Coruscant to aid the Rebellion in secret and urges Mon to continue with her plans and relocate to Yavin 4 while he prepares an extraction team. Later, she prepares a speech condemning Palpatine while she and Erskin sweep her office for listening devices and she smashes one, putting the ISB on alert. Luthen intercepts Mon outside, revealing that Erskin has been his agent since the wedding. She refuses to trust him due to his constant secrets, despite his insistence that Bail's team is compromised by the ISB and that she should trust his agents instead. A distraught Mon later confronts Erskin about his activities and fires him. The following day, a worried Mon questions Bail about his team, who admits that he does not know them personally. The ISB mole in the team, Beska (Ana Ularu), is discovered by another member whom she kills.

In the Imperial senate, the senators frame the Ghorman Massacre as an unjustified attack by the Ghor by focusing on the deaths of Imperial soldiers and tourists from their worlds. In order to allow Mon to speak after being prevented from doing so as a dissident senator, Bail invokes a technicality in Senate procedure to yield his full time to Mon. In her speech, she condemns the treatment of the Ghor people and the false portrayal of events by other senators and denounces Palpatine as a 'monster' culpable for 'unprovoked genocide'. Imperials attempt to shut down the broadcast, but are hindered by Senate staff with rebel sympathies. After her speech ends and the broadcast is shut down, a manhunt for Mon ensues, while she is approached by Cassian who identifies himself as Luthen's agent. He wins her trust by describing his complicated relationship with Luthen and his history with Vel. The pair are swarmed by journalists and are approached by Bail's team, with Beska producing a blaster and attempting to arrest Mon. Erskin distracts Beska and allows Cassian to kill her with his own blaster, while he stays behind to prevent the journalists and the remaining member of Bail's team from following. After exiting the building, they are approached by Mon's driver and ISB spy Exmar Kloris (Lee Ross). Cassian pretends to have captured Mon before swiftly killing him, then uses Mon's limousine to escape. At the Axis network safehouse, Cassian, Mon, and Erskin reconvene, where the latter two reconcile. In the aftermath, she is arranged to be collected by Gold Squadron and transported above Dantooine where she is to make a speech uniting the scattered rebel factions into the Alliance to Restore the Republic.

Mon reappears in the series finale "Jedha, Kyber, Erso", taking place one year after the formal militarization of the Rebel Alliance and days before the Battle of Yavin. Following Luthen's death in "Make It Stop" and Cassian's unsanctioned rescue of Kleya in "Who Else Knows?" and continuing early into the series finale, she argues with Saw Gerrera (Forest Whitaker) over holoprojector regarding his attacks on kyber crystal shipments on Jedha. She tries to warn him that the Empire has dispatched a Star Destroyer, but Saw angrily rebuffs her and ends the transmission. Cassian is brought before Alliance High Command and he relays Luthen's information about the Death Star, but they dismiss it out of hand due to their strained relationship with him. Enraged, Cassian defends Luthen and accuses Alliance leadership of casually disregarding him and the sacrifices he made for the Rebellion, while also emphasizing that they would not be standing together if not for his efforts. Mon echoes his sentiments and vouches for Luthen as well. Bail confines Cassian for insubordination, but Mon grants him permission to visit Kleya in the infirmary. She later asks Vel to confirm Luthen's story with Cassian whom they later release on a mission to verify its existence from an informant at the Ring of Kafrene, leading directly into the events of Rogue One.

==== Ahsoka (2023) ====
O'Reilly appears as Mon, now the Chancellor of the New Republic, in the series Ahsoka. In "Part Three: Time to Fly", General Hera Syndulla (Mary Elizabeth Winstead) seeks New Republic resources from Mon and her team of high-ranking government officials, but Senator Hamato Xiono (Nelson Lee) is dubious of Hera's desire to pursue rumors of Grand Admiral Thrawn. In "Part Five: Shadow Warrior", Mon appears to Hera via hologram, warning Hera that her disobedience has prompted New Republic Oversight to demand her return to Coruscant to be questioned by them. In "Part Seven: Dreams and Madness", Mon reluctantly oversees the tribunal administering Hera's disciplinary hearing, and comes to believe that the threat of Thrawn's return is real.

=== Other media ===
==== Novels ====
Chuck Wendig's 2015 novel Aftermath establishes that after the events of Return of the Jedi, Mon quickly transitions the Rebel Alliance into the New Republic, forming the New Republic Senate and becoming the new government's first Chancellor. Hoping to prevent the New Republic from ever becoming corrupted into a fascist state, she scales down the centralized military in favor of local planetary forces. In the 2016 novel Star Wars: Bloodline, Mon has stepped down as Chancellor due to illness. But her attempt to prevent centralized overmilitarization from creating a new Empire by advocating a drastic reduction of the New Republic fleet has sparked the rise of two opposing factions in the Senate: the Populists, who support autonomy of individual planets and systems, and the Centrists, who believe a stronger central government is necessary. As member systems are allowed to build their own defense forces, some Centrist elements ultimately back the nascent First Order regime.

Mon also appears briefly in the novels Lost Stars (2015), The Princess and the Scoundrel (2022) and the Alphabet Squadron trilogy (2019–2021).

==== Comics ====
Mon appears in the 2015 comic series Shattered Empire, set immediately after the events of Return of the Jedi. In the comic Star Wars #28 (October 2022), set after the events of The Empire Strikes Back (1980), Mon is informed that the Empire is building a second Death Star. While others are shocked to silence, she expresses her confidence that after destroying the first one, they can do it again.

=== Star Wars Legends ===
Mon Mothma has a major role in Star Wars Legends media. Star Wars Legends refers to the alternate continuity of Star Wars ancillary works starting with the 1991 Timothy Zahn novel Heir to the Empire and ending when Lucasfilm rebranded the "Expanded Universe" continuity in 2014 to accommodate plans for film sequels, TV series and new fiction. In this continuity, New Republic Chief of State Mon Mothma is unable to demilitarize the government due to ongoing conflicts with Imperial warlords and other remnants of the Empire. In Heir to the Empire, she becomes the New Republic's Chief of State and works with characters including Princess Leia, Luke Skywalker, Han Solo and Admiral Ackbar to restore Coruscant as the democratic heart of the galaxy. Mon survives an assassination attempt in the Jedi Academy trilogy (1994), and prepares Leia to become her successor.

In the 1990s comic series Dark Empire, Mon also helps Luke form a New Jedi Order less involved with Republic politics than the original Jedi.

The 1993 West End Games Dark Empire Sourcebook for Star Wars: The Roleplaying Game notes that Mon and her family were forced to flee their homeworld when she was revealed to be part of the Rebel Alliance. Her son, Jobin, was a rebel soldier killed in the Battle of Hoth, and Mon's duties as a resistance leader impacted the time she could spend with her daughter, Lieda. Both The Essential Guide to Characters (1995) and The Complete Star Wars Encyclopedia (2008) mention that Lieda ultimately worked alongside Mon toward peace for the Republic.

==== Video games ====
Mon is featured in the 1995 first-person shooter video game Star Wars: Dark Forces. She appears in the 2008 action-adventure video game The Force Unleashed, and its novelization. In the story, Bail Organa meets with fellow senators Mon and Garm Bel Iblis on Corellia to formally organize a rebellion, only for the group to be arrested by Darth Vader.

== Merchandising ==
Hasbro has produced three Mon Mothma action figures: the Star Wars: The Power of the Force II Mon Mothma with Baton in 1998; the Star Wars: Revenge of the Sith Collection Mon Mothma in 2005; and an Andor-related figure, Star Wars: The Black Series Senator Mon Mothma, in 2023.

== Reception ==
Eric Diaz of Nerdist News called Mon Mothma "crucial to Star Wars". Adrian Quidilla of Screen Rant wrote that "Mon Mothma's ability to inspire and organize a galaxy-wide revolution makes her arguably the most significant Rebellion figure of them all, as the outcome of the Star Wars original trilogy couldn't have happened without her unflagging hope." Jeremy Smith of Slashfilm agreed that the character has been an integral figure in the Star Wars saga since her first film appearance", but noted that prior to Andor, Mon had been "completely underserved" in live-action media. Corey Larson of Screen Rant called O'Reilly's performance in Andor "revelatory", noting that "George Lucas clearly recognized how Mon Mothma had the potential to be a pivotal and popular figure in Star Wars lore and that O'Reilly was the perfect candidate for the job." Simon Cardy of IGN agreed that "O'Reilly is fantastic in her portrayal of a thoroughly empathetic character going up against an Empire [in Andor]". Blake Hawkins of Comic Book Resources called Mon a "badass" and "master manipulator" for the character's actions in the season one finale "Rix Road".

O'Reilly's portrayal of Mon Mothma has received a universally positive critical reception, and Blakiston's initial cameo role as the character has become an Internet meme.
