= K-2SO =

Character in the Star Wars universe

- Star Wars character
- K-2SO in Rogue One
- First appearance: Rogue One (2016)
- Last appearance: "Jedha, Kyber, Erso"; Andor (2025)
- Created by: John Knoll
- Portrayed by: Alan Tudyk
- Voiced by: Alan Tudyk

In-universe information
- Species: KX Droid Unit
- Gender: Masculine programming
- Occupation: Imperial security droid (formerly); Co-pilot of Cassian Andor
- Affiliation: Galactic Empire (formerly); Rebel Alliance
- Homeworld: Vulpter

K-2SO (also referred to as K2 or Kay-Tuesso) is a droid character in the Star Wars franchise, first appearing in the film Rogue One (2016), and reappearing in the second season of Andor (2025). He is a CGI character voiced and portrayed through motion capture by Alan Tudyk. K-2SO is a reprogrammed Imperial security droid and the co-pilot of Cassian Andor.

== Character ==
=== Development ===
K-2SO was part of the initial line-up of spies in John Knoll's pitch for Rogue One, as an Imperial protocol droid who previously tried to kill Andor. Designs for the character's look focused on giving him both a unique silhouette as well as keeping him in tune with the Imperial aesthetic from A New Hope. References of Imperial designs were used, and the character's chest plate draws on the armor of an AT-AT commander in The Empire Strikes Back. Unused designs by Ralph McQuarrie for droids and stormtrooper helmets would influence his eventual head shape. Originally designed as a "black protocol droid," further story development and drafts that "accentuated" his ties to the Empire turned K-2SO into an Imperial security droid. His laid back personality became a "visually amusing" contrast to his "towering, monolithic form." Director Gareth Edwards wanted K-2SO to be "appealing" despite his figure, and designs continued to reflect elements of his personality with his form; his stoop is one example, showing his "casual kind of personality."

=== Portrayal ===
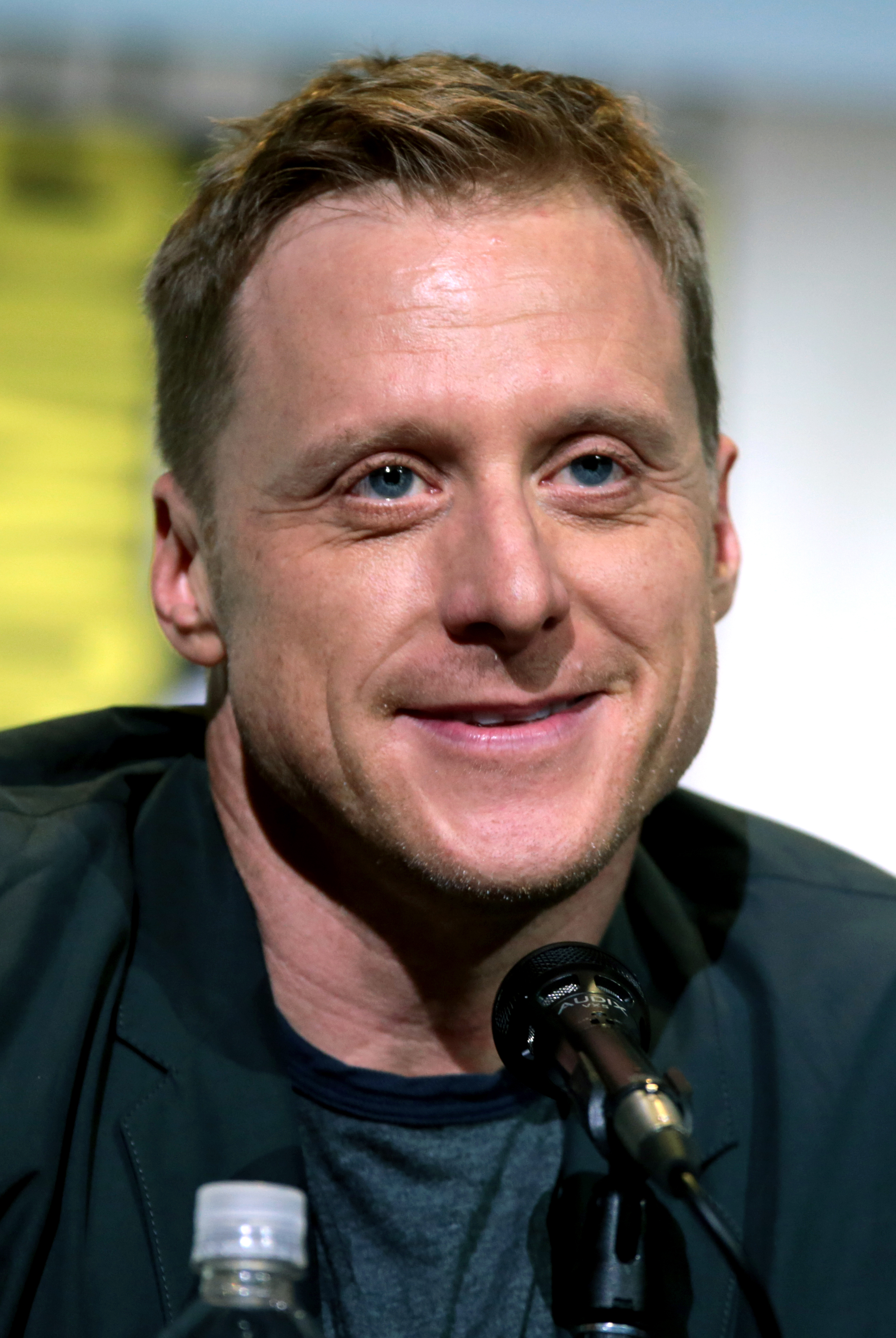
American actor Alan Tudyk portrays K-2SO.

K-2SO is voiced and portrayed via motion capture by Alan Tudyk. Tudyk initially turned down the role as he felt he would be busy with Con Man, a webseries he had crowdfunded. The droid's height meant Tudyk had to wear 13 in (33 cm) tall stilts to perform the character, which he had difficulty taking off and thus would take to the bathroom. Tudyk called the stiltwalking the most challenging part of playing the droid, finding further difficulty in walking over things like sand and running. K-2, when rendered, had a slightly hunched over look. So, in order to prevent his own slouch from being added to the character, Tudyk had to force himself to stand up straight. With K-2SO having an inanimate face, Tudyk tried to keep "emotion" in his body and his movement. The actor worked with a mask teacher, Orlando Pabotoy.

Tudyk auditioned with three different accents: an American accent, a mid-Atlantic accent, and an English accent. The English accent was chosen due to the character's Imperial roots, and as he was a droid Tudyk gave him a more formal "proper" accent. Tudyk improvised or altered many of K-2SO's lines. However, he was concerned about making the character an "outlier in his own movie", similar to Jar Jar Binks, hoping to keep K-2SO feeling like "part of the world".

Industrial Light & Magic used a modified Unreal Engine 4 in a scene to render the droid in real-time while filming. This was the first time they had been able to "work with CGI in the moment".

=== Description ===
K-2SO is a KX-series droid, originally created by the Empire, reprogrammed to serve the Rebel Alliance. He is co-pilot and "sidekick" to Andor, and lends comic relief to the film. Ann Hornaday of The Washington Post noted K-2SO's "angular, spidery limbed" appearance, calling him "snippily sarcastic". IGN's Eric Goldman described the droid as "C-3PO's dark, amped up counterpoint. Like Threepio, he has a knack for giving troubling statistics, but instead of speaking with a worried attitude, K-2SO ... has more of a resigned and often amusingly cruel and blunt approach." Similarly, Chris Nashawaty of Entertainment Weekly called the character "C3PO's more sarcastic, less fey cousin." Todd McCarthy described K-2SO as "a more useful, resourceful and sarcastic version of C-3PO" in The Hollywood Reporter. Peter Bradshaw of The Guardian compared the character to the titular robot from Ted Hughes' novel The Iron Man, writing:

K-2SO is hulking and dark, more like Ted Hughes's Iron Man in miniature, but with a droll way of objecting to orders; his style in backtalk involves a nicely timed deferred punchline. The arms are long, resulting in an almost knuckle-dragging, simian way of walking. In his taciturn way, K-2SO could almost be a quasi-Chewie presence.

== Appearances ==
=== Rogue One ===
K-2SO, portrayed by Tudyk, appears in Rogue One: A Star Wars Story, which was released in December 2016. In the film, he is the second-in-command of Cassian Andor and rescues Jyn Erso from an Imperial labor camp on Wobani. The three travel to Jedha to obtain a message from scientist Galen Erso, the father of Jyn. K-2SO is told to stay on the ship, but later helps the rebels fight off stormtroopers and make their escape from Jedha City as it is being destroyed by the Death Star. Later, he joins a group of Rebel volunteers to acquire the Death Star plans on Scarif. Accompanied by a disguised Cassian and Jyn, K-2SO infiltrates the planet's Imperial base and stays in the control room while Andor and Erso search for the schematics in the data vault. Though he manages to fend off some attacking stormtroopers, K-2SO succumbs to multiple shots, but not before destroying the control panel of the vault door, locking the closed door. His sacrifice prevents Jyn and Cassian from being killed by stormtroopers and allows them to successfully steal the plans.

According to Tudyk, K-2SO had a different death in the original ending of Rogue One. The character was to be shot and killed by Orson Krennic, the main villain of the film, but the writers thought that K-2SO deserved a more heroic demise, which they considered more suitable for him.

=== Andor ===
K-2SO makes his debut in the second season of Andor during the eighth episode, "Who Are You?", which was released in May 2025. He is originally a ruthless KX-unit droid that targets demonstrators on Ghorman during the Imperial massacre of the planet's citizens, killing numerous civilians until Samm, one of the Ghorman rebels, rams him with a vehicle, disabling him. Andor ultimately decides to take the KX-unit's parts with him when he leaves the planet. Soon after Bix Caleen's departure from Yavin, the rebel technicians, led by Fay Drolla (Tim Plester), have repaired and reprogrammed the droid to serve them.

K-2SO accompanies Andor and Melshi to Coruscant on their mission to extract Luthen Rael's ally Kleya Marki. Initially staying on the ship, he is called into action when he sees an Imperial shuttle, carrying a group of elite Imperial troopers, touch down. K2 makes short work of the Imperials. Later, after Rebel general Davits Draven is convinced that Luthen's intel is too great of a match to be a trap, K2 accompanies Andor to the Ring of Kafrene to meet with a Rebel informant.

=== Related works and merchandising ===
K-2SO appears in the novelization of Rogue One by Alexander Freed. Tudyk reprises the role in the short film "The Good Stuff!" during the first episode of Lego Star Wars: All Stars. A non-canon one-shot comic book, Star Wars: Rogue One – Cassian and K-2SO, was released in August 2017. Set some time before the events of Rogue One, it tells the story of how Cassian Andor and K-2SO first met. The events of the comic were retconned in Andor; series creator Tony Gilroy was aware of the comic's story, but was annoyed by it and decided to rewrite K-2SO's origin story. K-2SO also appeared in Star Wars: Secrets of the Empire, a virtual reality experience produced by ILMxLAB and The VOID for Disneyland Resort; Alan Tudyk reprised his role as K-2SO, who accompanies the player throughout the experience. He is also a major character in the junior novel The Mighty Chewbacca in the Forest of Fear!

== Reception ==
Tudyk has been widely praised in the role. Recounting fan reaction on Twitter, Megan McCluskey wrote for Time that "there seems to be one aspect of the standalone Star Wars story that the majority of viewers have agreed on: the excellence of K-2SO." Justin Chang of Los Angeles Times dubbed the character "the requisite scene stealer" of the film, and A. O. Scott of The New York Times praised "the dry, sarcastic tones of the indispensable Alan Tudyk." The Hollywood Reporter's Todd McCarthy called K-2SO the film's "most entertaining" character, complimenting his design and Tudyk's "droll wit and exquisite timing". IGN's Eric Goldman praised the cast of the film but noted, "it's Tudyk's K-2SO who's often the standout", adding that the actor's performance gives the character "a sympathetic 'soul' (if such a word is appropriate for a droid)". Goldman also wrote that "K-2SO looks so good, it's easy to forget he's a CGI character". The Washington Post's Michael Cavna praised K-2SO, calling him "a droid for social-media times ... freshly armed with comedic snark." Ann Hornaday, also of The Washington Post, wrote that the character "provides precious comic relief in a film that is otherwise grim and unsmiling". Richard Brody of The New Yorker described the droid as "the one character with any inner identity ... and the only performance with any flair at all". Peter Travers of Rolling Stone and IndieWire's David Ehrlich dubbed K-2SO the best of the film's new characters, with Travers calling the robot "hilarious" and Ehrlich describing him as "a droll bot with killer comic timing, he's as delightful and alive as any animated character you could find in a Disney film".

Tudyk was nominated for the Primetime Emmy Award for Outstanding Character Voice-Over Performance award for his performance as K-2SO in the Andor episode "Who Else Knows?" in 2025.

== Bibliography ==
- Kushins, Josh (2016). The Art of Rogue One: A Star Wars Story. New York: Abrams. ISBN 978-1-4197-2225-7.
