= Who Else Knows? =

- Andor episode
- Dedra Meero (Denise Gough) is interrogated by Orson Krennic (Ben Mendelsohn), who jabs the top of her head with his finger in a moment improvised by Mendelsohn.
- Episode no.: Season 2 Episode 11
- Directed by: Alonso Ruizpalacios
- Written by: Tom Bissell
- Cinematography by: Damián García
- Editing by: Matthew Cannings
- Original release date: May 13, 2025
- Running time: 42 minutes

Guest appearances
- Jacob James Beswick as Supervisor Heert; Muhannad Bhaier as Wilmon Paak; Ella Pellegrini as Dreena; Duncan Pow as Ruescott Melshi; Alistair Petrie as General Davits Draven; Caoilfhionn Dunne as Lepori; Ben Mendelsohn as Orson Krennic; Alan Tudyk as K-2SO; Tony Gilroy as Rebel Flight Controller (uncredited) (Note: Gilroy reprises this role from Rogue One, where his performance was also uncredited)

Episode chronology
← Previous "Make It Stop"	Next → "Jedha, Kyber, Erso"

"Who Else Knows?" is the eleventh and penultimate episode of the second season of the American science fiction political spy thriller drama television series Andor. It is the twenty-third episode of the series overall; it was written by Tom Bissell and directed by Alonso Ruizpalacios.

"Who Else Knows?" was released on Disney+ on May 13, 2025 as part of a three-episode block also including "Make It Stop" and "Jedha, Kyber, Erso", and received universal acclaim from critics and audiences alike.

== Plot ==
Dedra Meero is interrogated by Orson Krennic, who admonishes her for allowing the Death Star's existence to be leaked from her database and for confronting Luthen without sufficient backup. Krennic accuses Dedra of being a Rebel spy, but Dedra insists that files pertaining to the Death Star were forwarded to her by mistake, and that it was by searching them that she found evidence identifying Luthen as Axis. She insists that Kleya Marki must be found and (correctly) guesses that Jung must be the spy, but Krennic tells Dedra that the investigation will continue without her.

Heert, who has taken over the Axis assignment, identifies Kleya from security footage at the hospital and briefs Partagaz and Krennic about her role in the break-in. Krennic orders Heert to hunt her down, and Partagaz manufactures a cover story about Kleya carrying an infectious disease as pretext. After Heert leaves, Partagaz admonishes Krennic for not having the Death Star ready yet. Krennic departs for Scarif to oversee the Death Star's completion after obliquely warning Partagaz that Emperor Palpatine may have them both executed unless Kleya is captured before forwarding the information to the Rebellion.

Kleya, meanwhile, returns to the safe house and retrieves a radio hidden inside one of the walls. She sends a distress signal, which is picked up both by the damaged communications system in the antiques shop and by a receiver under Wilmon and Dreena's bunk on Yavin. Wilmon finds Cassian and Melshi playing cards with K-2SO and urges them to respond to the signal. Cassian, Melshi and K-2SO fly to Coruscant without authorization from Rebel leadership in search of Luthen; an exasperated General Draven has Wilmon confined to quarters.

Heert goes to an imprisoned Dedra for advice on tracking Kleya. Dedra suggests looking into old pulse codes similar to those used by the Rebels on Ferrix, but warns that he may be too late. Cassian's team arrives outside the safe house and activates their own radio, but Heert's technicians pick up the signal on the damaged terminal at the antiques shop. They trace the location of the safe house and Heert takes an armed team to raid it.

While K-2SO waits on the ship, Cassian and Melshi enter the apartment and find Kleya, who tells them Luthen is dead and passes on the information about the Empire's superweapon. Cassian urges her to flee with them to Yavin, but Kleya would rather stay behind, as the Yavin rebels distrust Luthen. Heert's team arrives shortly after Cassian's and enters the apartment building in search of the signal source. K-2SO notices their arrival and follows after them, killing the soldiers stationed outside. The armed team closes in on the safe house.

== Production ==
=== Writing ===
The episode was written by Tom Bissell, in his second writing credit for the show, and directed by Alonso Ruizpalacios, after directing the previous episode of the series. The episodes of Andor's second season, like those of its first, are split up into blocks, or story arcs, of three episodes; however, unlike in season one, each arc begins with a time skip of one year from the previous episode. Series showrunner Tony Gilroy decided to structure the season this way after concluding that the original five-season plan for the show was unfeasible, and needing some way to bridge the four years between season 1 and Rogue One (2016) in a single season. As proof of concept, he wrote the first and last episodes of each would-be arc, and eventually decided on this structure for the season. The final three episodes of the season cover the three days prior to the start of Rogue One, with Gilroy saying "it'll be, like, four or five days, and then we'll jump a year, and then there'll be another four or five days, and then we jump a year", with the final shot leading into Rogue One.

Bissell was "worried about" the scene in which Krennic interrogates Dedra because "It was long, it was shaggy, it was filled with tons of technical detail and disclosures about stuff that had happened off-screen that is really important." He and Gilroy perfected it together, and Bissell said, "Seeing the way people have responded to that scene has been one of the most gratifying things I've experienced. It is a riveting scene. And that all comes down to the performances and the way Alonso Ruizpalacios blocked it." Bissell also noted that the action of Krennic placing his finger on Dedra's head was unscripted: "When you have a long scene like that, it is paramount that you find the power exchanges and the turns, because they're not necessarily there on the page. And the way that they made that conversation feel so alive, and such a power struggle, that's just people reading what's on the page and making very smart choices about how to put it on its feet and, as [Gilroy] always says, 'make it real.'" Fantha Tracks called the scene "iconic", and Screen Rant explained, "Specifically seeing Orson Krennic jab a finger onto [Dedra's] head reinforced that she, like most Imperials, was just a cog in the machine."

=== Casting ===
In "Who Else Knows?", marking his third appearance on Andor, Ben Mendelsohn reprises his role as Orson Krennic from previous Star Wars media, including Rogue One, in which he served as the main antagonist.

=== Music ===
The original score for "Who Else Knows?", as with nine other episodes of the season's twelve, (Note: All episodes of season 2 but "Ever Been to Ghorman?" and "I Have Friends Everywhere" credit Roberts as the main composer) was composed by Brandon Roberts, replacing Nicholas Britell, the composer for the show's first season, due to scheduling conflicts.

The soundtrack for the episode was released alongside that of the other two episodes in its block on May 16, 2025 via Walt Disney Records as part of the last of four volumes of the second season's original score.

Andor Season 2: Episode 11 (Original Soundtrack)
No.	Title	Length
1.	"Andor (Main Title Theme) – Episode 11"	0:47
2.	"It's Only Her"	2:14
3.	"Safe House Fractal"	0:53
4.	"Mayday!"	1:47
5.	"Tactical Location"	3:51
6.	"I'm Not Leaving You Here"	4:12
Total length:		13:44

== Release ==
"Who Else Knows?" was released on Disney+ on May 13, 2025 as part of a three-episode block, alongside "Make It Stop" and "Jedha, Kyber, Erso".

== Reception ==
=== Critical response ===
The review aggregator website Rotten Tomatoes reports a 100% approval rating, based on 7 reviews.

William Hughes of The A.V. Club gave a positive review, writing "What follows is, on the whole, an episode of Andor built in Cassian Andor's own image: light on philosophical musings and heavy on thrills." Mike Redmond of Pajiba also gave a positive review, summarizing that "Have I mentioned Elizabeth Dulau rocks? Elizabeth Dulau rocks. If you leave with anything, make it that".

=== Accolades ===
For his performance as K-2SO in this episode, Alan Tudyk was nominated for Outstanding Character Voice-Over Performance at the 77th Primetime Creative Arts Emmy Awards.
