= Make It Stop (Andor) =

- Andor episode
- Luthen Rael (Stellan Skarsgård) makes his way down stairs in Coruscant after learning of the Death Star from informant Lonni Jung, whom he has just killed.
- Episode no.: Season 2 Episode 10
- Directed by: Alonso Ruizpalacios
- Written by: Tom Bissell
- Cinematography by: Damián García
- Editing by: Morten Højbjerg
- Original release date: May 13, 2025
- Running time: 48 minutes

Guest appearances
- Robert Emms as Lonni Jung; Jacob James Beswick as Supervisor Heert; Michael Jenn as Supervisor Lagret; Anton Lesser as Major Partagaz; Caoilfhionn Dunne as Lepori; April V Woods as Little Kleya

Episode chronology
← Previous "Welcome to the Rebellion"	Next → "Who Else Knows?"

"Make It Stop" is the tenth episode of the second season of the American science fiction political spy thriller drama television series Andor. It is the twenty-second episode of the series overall; it was written by Tom Bissell and directed by Alonso Ruizpalacios.

"Make It Stop" is set in BBY 1, (Note: The year of the Battle of Yavin, i.e., the climax of Star Wars (1977)) a year after the events of the previous episode. It is the first, and only, episode of the series not to feature Diego Luna as Cassian Andor, instead focusing on Luthen Rael (Stellan Skarsgård) and Kleya Marki (Elizabeth Dulau) and their backstory, culminating in Luthen's death at Kleya's hands. The episode thus marks Skarsgård's final appearance on the show, as well as the final appearance of Robert Emms' Lonni Jung, who is killed by Luthen early in the episode.

"Make It Stop" was released on Disney+ on May 13, 2025 as part of a three-episode block also including "Who Else Knows?" and "Jedha, Kyber, Erso". The episode received widespread critical acclaim for its writing, emotional weight, and the performances of Skarsgård and Dulau.

== Plot ==
One year after the events on Ghorman and Mon Mothma's subsequent speech, (Note: As depicted in "Welcome to the Rebellion") Luthen and Kleya Marki receive an emergency ping to the shop's radio from Lonni. Luthen meets him in public. Lonni reveals that he has had access to Dedra Meero's ISB credentials for a year, through which he has learned that the Emperor's energy program is a cover for a superweapon that Krennic has been building for over a decade. Lonni also mentions that he found references to Kyber crystal mining on Jedha, as well as an engineer named Galen Erso. (Note: As seen in Rogue One (2016).) Lonni also warns that Dedra has likely uncovered their identities and will come after him soon. He makes Luthen promise him and his family safe passage out of Coruscant, but Luthen kills him to ensure his silence.

Luthen meets with Kleya and hastily makes her memorize everything Lonni told him, then returns to the shop and destroys the radio by pouring a caustic liquid over it. He is interrupted when Dedra Meero arrives at the shop. Luthen maintains his friendly facade until Dedra shows him the stolen Imperial Starpath unit Cassian first tried selling to him, (Note: As depicted in "Reckoning".) confronting him as the mysterious "Axis" she has chased for years. Dedra says the building is surrounded, but Luthen tells her that she is too late and the Rebellion has already expanded throughout the galaxy. Dedra notices the burning radio system and holds Luthen at gunpoint, only to realize he has stabbed himself with an ancient knife while she was distracted. She frantically calls in reinforcements to inspect the shop and medical staff to take Luthen to hospital. Kleya watches with a crowd of onlookers as Luthen gets taken away in a medical transport.

Kleya goes to the safe house Luthen provided Cassian and Bix (Note: As depicted in "Ever Been to Ghorman?") and retrieves a lockpicking device. She then travels to the hospital where Luthen is being kept, which is under heavy Imperial watch. She dons stolen nurse attire and evades follows Imperial personnel to Luthen. Dedra, meanwhile, is arrested by the ISB for botching Luthen's capture, and her former assistant Heert, now an ISB supervisor, takes over her investigation. Imperial technicians at Luthen's shop unsuccessfully try to salvage data from the destroyed radio.

As Kleya makes her way through the hospital, she reflects on her past with Luthen. Flashbacks reveal that Luthen was an Imperial sergeant named Lear, whose unit massacred people in Kleya's hometown when she was a child. He found Kleya hiding in his ship and informally adopted her while defecting from the Empire. The two began selling antiques under new identities while waging resistance against the Empire, including the bombing of Imperial vehicles on the Emperor's home world of Naboo.

In the present, Kleya detonates bombs she has placed on Imperial ships parked outside the hospital, creating a distraction that she uses to break into Luthen's ward. She tearfully disconnects Luthen's life support system and watches him take his last breath, then flees as the guards return.

== Production ==
=== Writing ===
The episode was written by Tom Bissell, in his first writing credit for the show, and directed by Alonso Ruizpalacios, who would go on to also direct the last two episodes of the series. The final three episodes of the season cover the three days prior to the start of Rogue One (2016), with showrunner Tony Gilroy saying "it'll be, like, four or five days, and then we'll jump a year, and then there'll be another four or five days, and then we jump a year", with the final shot leading into Rogue One. Gilroy expressed that after gaining confidence in Elizabeth Dulau's acting abilities from director feedback during the production of the first season, he did not want to leave the relationship between Kleya and Luthen ambiguous or explained by other creators, leading to the creation of the flashback scenes in the episode, depicting their relationship, which was inspired by the road movie Paper Moon (1973). Kleya's infiltration into the hospital was originally going to be far more elaborate, which would have led to two more flashbacks, which consisted in Luther purchasing the Fondor with Kleya first exploring it and the two visiting the location that would become their shop for the first time with the real estate agent who would sell it to them with they choosing it for themselves to buy it. However, those scenes had to be dropped because there was no room left for them once those additional hospital scenes had to be dropped due to the specific location they were written to take place became unavailable. Subtle de-aging was employed on Stellan Skarsgård to play Luthen for those scenes, consisting on light with no make-up with Skarsgård making sure his eyes were visible during all of his shots.

=== Music ===
The original score for "Make It Stop", as with nine other episodes of the season's twelve, (Note: All episodes of season 2 but "Ever Been to Ghorman?" and "I Have Friends Everywhere" credit Roberts as the main composer) was composed by Brandon Roberts, replacing Nicholas Britell, the composer for the show's first season, due to scheduling conflicts.

The soundtrack for the episode was released alongside that of the other two episodes in its block on May 16, 2025, via Walt Disney Records as part of the last of four volumes of the second season's original score.

Andor Season 2: Episode 10 (Original Soundtrack)
No.	Title	Length
1.	"Andor (Main Title Theme) – Episode 10"	0:43
2.	"A Weapon"	2:50
3.	"What Have You Done?"	1:39
4.	"Nurse Kleya"	1:50
5.	"You're Finished"	1:36
6.	"We've Made Our Choice"	1:36
7.	"Luthen..."	2:23
Total length:		12:37

== Release ==
"Make It Stop" was released on Disney+ on May 13, 2025, as part of a three-episode block, alongside "Who Else Knows?" and "Jedha, Kyber, Erso".

== Reception ==
=== Critical response ===
The review aggregator website Rotten Tomatoes reports a 100% approval rating, based on 7 reviews.

William Hughes of The A.V. Club gave a positive review, writing "We embark fully into Andor's final stretch, with our hero nowhere to be seen, the Rebellion in uncertain waters, and the most important information in the universe kicking around in one lonely spy's hunted head." Mike Redmond of Pajiba also gave a positive review, summarizing that "Andor doesn't have to be praised for every little thing or fascism wins. It's just a TV show, folks. A very brilliant one, but let's bring it down a notch".
