= Jedha, Kyber, Erso =

- Andor episode
- Cassian Andor (Diego Luna) makes eye contact with the Yavin Force healer (Josie Walker) on his way to the Ring of Kafrene, directly leading to the events of Rogue One.
- Episode no.: Season 2 Episode 12
- Directed by: Alonso Ruizpalacios
- Written by: Tom Bissell
- Cinematography by: Damián García
- Editing by: Matthew Cannings
- Original release date: May 13, 2025
- Running time: 46 minutes

Guest appearances
- Ben Mendelsohn as Orson Krennic; Alan Tudyk as K-2SO; Forest Whitaker as Saw Gerrera; Duncan Pow as Ruescott Melshi; Jacob James Beswick as Supervisor Heert; Alistair Petrie as General Davits Draven; Muhannad Bhaier as Wilmon Paak; Sharon Duncan-Brewster as Senator Tynnra Pamlo; Jonathan Aris as Senator Nower Jebel; Stephen Stanton as Admiral Raddus (voice); Alex Lawther as Karis Nemik (voice); Michael Jenn as Supervisor Lagret; Ella Pellegrini as Dreena; Alastair Mackenzie as Perrin Fertha; Rosalind Halstead as Runai Sculdun; Josie Walker as Force healer; Dave Chapman as B2EMO (voice)

Episode chronology
| ← Previous "Who Else Knows?" | Next → "Rogue One" |

"Jedha, Kyber, Erso" is the series finale of the American science fiction political spy thriller drama television series Andor. It is the twelfth episode of the second season and the twenty-fourth episode of the series overall; it was written by Tom Bissell and directed by Alonso Ruizpalacios.

"Jedha, Kyber, Erso" was released on Disney+ on May 13, 2025 as part of a three-episode block also including "Make It Stop" and "Who Else Knows?". The episode received universal acclaim from critics and audiences alike for its performances, direction, cinematography and emotional weight.

== Plot ==
After locating the source of Kleya Marki's transmission, (Note: As depicted in "Who Else Knows?") Heert and his team approach the safehouse, where Cassian and Melshi have convinced Kleya to return with them to Yavin and convey Luthen's information about the Death Star. (Note: Luthen receives this information from Lonni Jung in "Make It Stop") They are pinned down in a shootout with the Imperials, and Kleya is concussed by a stun grenade. K-2SO comes to their rescue, making short work of Heert and his team. The four return to the U-wing and depart for Yavin.

On Yavin, Mon, Bail Organa, and Draven argue with Saw Gerrera by holoprojector about the latter's attacks on kyber shipments on Jedha. After Saw angrily ends their call, the group is informed that Cassian's U-wing has returned to the base. Bail is angry at Cassian's insubordination; Draven and Admiral Raddus arrange for a hostile interception of the returning ship, and Cassian is brought before the Alliance council to explain himself. He informs them of Luthen's death (Note: As depicted in "Make It Stop") and relays Kleya's information, but it is met with skepticism due to the councillors' strained relationship with Luthen Rael. Cassian defends Luthen, saying that the councillors have given "a fraction of his sacrifice" to the rebellion. Bail dismisses and confines Cassian, though Mon allows him to visit Kleya in the infirmary. Cassian tells Kleya that he is doing all he can to persuade the council.

Mon asks Vel Sartha to talk to Cassian and try to confirm his story. Vel visits Cassian in his quarters, where they toast their fallen comrades and victims of the Empire. Cassian relates his story to her, which she finds trustworthy. As Vel leaves, she suggests that Cassian reconnect with Bix Caleen. Encountering a distraught Kleya wandering outside in the rain, Vel brings her home and consoles her. They discuss Luthen, and Kleya laments her position as an outsider in Yavin. Vel responds by quoting the rebel code phrase "I have friends everywhere", telling Kleya that she is safe among friends.

On Coruscant, Partagaz listens to Nemik's manifesto, (Note: First heard in "Rix Road") noting with chagrin that it is being shared widely. Lagret informs him that he is expected to appear before his superiors and answer for his failure to contain the leaked Death Star information. Partagaz asks that Lagret allow him to "collect his thoughts"; when Lagret leaves the room, he kills himself.

Draven is informed that Tivik, (Note: Portrayed by Daniel Mays in Rogue One) Cassian's contact with Saw Gerrera, has sent several urgent messages from Kafrene, and is only willing to speak to Cassian. Draven and Mon decide to send Cassian to meet Tivik and demand that Bail hear them out. K-2SO wakes Cassian from a dream of his sister, and Bail authorises Cassian to proceed to Kafrene. When asked what changed his mind, Bail tells Cassian "if I die fighting the Empire, I want to go down swinging." Cassian suggests that Bail is more similar to Luthen than he would like to believe.

Cassian makes his way to his ship. Along the way, he passes the Force healer (Note: Last seen in "Messenger") and they share a somber look. Cassian and K-2SO depart for the Ring of Kafrene. (Note: This leads directly into the events of Rogue One)

In an epilogue montage, Dedra Meero is seen sobbing in a prison similar to the one Cassian experienced in Season 1. Kleya observes the day-to-day work on Yavin. Mon and Vel have breakfast with fellow rebels in the base, while Wilmon and Dreena eat together in their room. Perrin Fertha drinks in a limo with Davo Sculdun's wife Runai. Saw watches an Imperial Star Destroyer hover above Jedha City. Krennic looks out on the Death Star, which is in its final stages of construction. On Mina-Rau, B2EMO plays with another droid, while Bix cradles a baby, implied to be Cassian's child.

== Production ==
=== Writing ===
The episode was written by Tom Bissell, in his third writing credit for the show, and directed by Alonso Ruizpalacios, after directing the previous two episodes of the series. The episodes of Andor's second season, like those of its first, are split up into blocks, or story arcs, of three episodes; however, unlike in season one, each arc begins with a time skip of one year from the previous episode. Series showrunner Tony Gilroy decided to structure the season this way after concluding that the original five-season plan for the show was unfeasible, and needing some way to bridge the four years between season 1 and Rogue One (2016) in a single season. As proof of concept, he wrote the first and last episodes of each would-be arc, and eventually decided on this structure for the season. The final three episodes of the season cover the three days prior to the start of Rogue One, with Gilroy saying "it'll be, like, four or five days, and then we'll jump a year, and then there'll be another four or five days, and then we jump a year", with the final scene of Cassian heading to the Ring of Kafrene leading into Rogue One.

Of Cassian's dream of his sister right before being dispatched to meet Tivik, Bissell stated that it was not written in any script, instead being added in the edit by editor and executive producer John Gilroy and his team.

Due to the episode's final moments connecting with the beginning of Rogue One, Gilroy was asked several times if he would consider bringing back Felicity Jones as Jyn Erso, but the showrunner never considered the possibility as he tried to sketch some versions of what they would do to make the episode unique, ultimately opting to not have characters they really didn't need if they could use others such as Daniel Mays' informant Tivik, feeling that it would be lame and "really disrespectful" to bring Erso back for a cameo appearance and that he would rather "honor" the film by keeping it straight.

=== Casting ===
By March 2023, Benjamin Bratt had been cast for the episode in an undisclosed role, later revealed to be Bail Organa, replacing Jimmy Smits in the role. In "Jedha, Kyber, Erso", marking his last appearance on Andor, Ben Mendelsohn reprises his role as Orson Krennic from previous Star Wars media, including Rogue One, in which he served as the main antagonist.

=== Music ===
The original score for "Jedha, Kyber, Erso", as with nine other episodes of the season's twelve, (Note: All episodes of season 2 but "Ever Been to Ghorman?" and "I Have Friends Everywhere" credit Roberts as the main composer) was composed by Brandon Roberts, replacing Nicholas Britell, the composer for the show's first season, due to scheduling conflicts. Like the season premiere "One Year Later", this episode reuses the opening title theme for the series premiere "Kassa", composed by Britell. This episode also includes a new arrangement of an excerpt of "The Throne Room and End Title" from the soundtrack of the original Star Wars film. The new arrangement plays at the end of the episode's credits.

The soundtrack for the episode was released alongside that of the other two episodes in its block on May 16, 2025 via Walt Disney Records as part of the last of four volumes of the second season's original score.

Andor Season 2: Episode 12 (Original Soundtrack)
| No. | Title | Length |
|---|---|---|
| 1. | "Safe House Showdown" | 1:58 |
| 2. | "Hard Right Coming" | 0:49 |
| 3. | "Escort to Yavin" | 2:37 |
| 4. | "He Made It Worth It" | 0:55 |
| 5. | "Past/Present/Future" | 5:57 |
| 6. | "The Throne Room and End Title" | 1:42 |
| Total length: | | 13:58 |

== Release ==
"Jedha, Kyber, Erso" was released on Disney+ on May 13, 2025 as part of a three-episode block, alongside "Make It Stop" and "Who Else Knows?".

== Reception ==
=== Critical response ===
The review aggregator website Rotten Tomatoes reports a 100% approval rating, based on 9 reviews.

William Hughes of The A.V. Club gave a positive review, writing "It is, on the whole, a fine finale, a satisfying conclusion to the story that Tony Gilroy and his comrades have been telling with the second season of this show."
