= Grand Moff Tarkin =

Fictional character in the Star Wars universe

- Star Wars character
- Peter Cushing as Grand Moff Tarkin (Note: Star Wars (1977))
- First appearance: Star Wars: From the Adventures of Luke Skywalker (1976 novelization); Star Wars (1977 film)
- Created by: George Lucas
- Portrayed by: Peter Cushing (Note: Star Wars); Wayne Pygram (Note: Revenge of the Sith); Guy Henry (Note: Rogue One)
- Voiced by: Stephen Stanton (Note: The Clone Wars (series) Star Wars Rebels The Bad Batch); Keene Curtis (Note: Radio drama); Paul Darrow (Note: Star Wars: Empire at War); Trevor Devall (Note: Lego Star Wars: Terrifying Tales); Nick Jameson (Note: Star Wars: X-Wing)

In-universe information
- Full name: Wilhuff Tarkin
- Occupation: Governor of Eriadu; Station Commander
- Affiliation: Galactic Republic; Galactic Empire
- Spouses: Thalassa Tarkin (Legends)
- Children: Ellian Zahra (surrogate daughter); Garoche Tarkin (son, Legends)
- Relatives: Gideon Tarkin (brother, Legends)
- Homeworld: Eriadu

Grand Moff Tarkin is a fictional character in the Star Wars franchise. He was introduced in the original 1977 Star Wars film (Note: Later retitled Star Wars: Episode IV – A New Hope) as the commander of the Death Star, a gigantic space station built by the Galactic Empire, equipped with an immensely powerful superlaser capable of obliterating entire planets. Tarkin is portrayed by Peter Cushing in Star Wars. Tarkin also appears in the films Revenge of the Sith and Rogue One, and in the animated series The Clone Wars, Rebels, and The Bad Batch. He is featured in the 2014 novel Tarkin, which details his backstory and his rise to power within the Empire. In 2006, the entertainment website IGN called Tarkin "one of the most formidable villains" in Star Wars history.

== Creation and portrayal ==
Tarkin's character was originally conceived as a holy man from the planet Aquila, but was changed to an antagonist. As the Emperor would not appear until later in the original trilogy, Lucas used Tarkin's final version as the "main villain" of the first film, a personification of the Empire. According to a book created to help promote the original film to prospective theaters, he aspires to become the Emperor.

Cushing later joked that he did not know what a "Grand Moff" actually was, and that it sounded like "something which infests a clothes closet". He characterized Tarkin as a "deeply cross and unpleasant gentleman". (Note: In the Galactic Empire, a "Moff" is the governor of a Sector, or subdivision of the Empire; a "Grand Moff" is the governor of an Oversector, a grouping of several Sectors.)

In the 2005 prequel film Revenge of the Sith, Wayne Pygram was able to achieve the likeness of a young version of Tarkin through the use of prosthetic makeup. For his performance as Tarkin in the animated series The Clone Wars, the voice actor Stephen Stanton researched Cushing's performances and then tried to imitate what Cushing might have sounded like in his mid-thirties and soften his voice to portray a level of humanity.

In the 2016 film Rogue One, archival footage and a digital scan of Peter Cushing's life mask made for the 1984 film Top Secret! were used to create a 3D CGI mask which was augmented and mapped to actor Guy Henry's face. Henry had studied Cushing's mannerisms many years previously for the lead role in British TV show Young Sherlock, but insisted on a screen test as he was not comfortable that his vocal imitation was accurate, stating he sounded more "Peter O'Toole than Peter Cushing". The ILM team searched through hours of footage to find suitable material of Cushing to build from. The footage from A New Hope was lit very differently from the lighting used in Rogue One and had to be digitally changed. The more they manipulated the lighting to match the other actors in the scenes the less like Cushing the character model looked, which meant creating a balancing act between "a digital figure" and "one who looked precisely like Cushing". The owners of Cushing's estate were heavily involved with the creation and had input right down to small and subtle adjustments. The result, which has been called "one of the most complex and costly CGI re-creations ever", received a mixed response, with questions being raised about the morality of using a dead actor's likeness.

== Appearances ==
=== Film ===
==== Star Wars (1977) ====
Introduced in the first film in the original Star Wars trilogy, Governor Tarkin is a Grand Moff of the Galactic Empire and commander of the Death Star. After Emperor Palpatine dissolves the Imperial Senate, Tarkin and Darth Vader (portrayed by David Prowse, voiced by James Earl Jones) are charged with pursuing and destroying the Rebel Alliance. He threatens Princess Leia Organa (Carrie Fisher) with the destruction of her home planet, Alderaan, if Leia does not reveal the location of the Rebel main base of operations. When Leia names the planet Dantooine as the base's location, he destroys Alderaan regardless, hoping to make an example out of the planet's support of the Rebellion. Upon learning that Leia's coerced information was false, Tarkin orders Leia's execution.

He allows the Rebels to escape the Death Star with Leia after placing a tracking beacon on the Millennium Falcon in order to find the Rebel base. He orders the Death Star to destroy the Rebel base on Yavin 4. In the film's climax, Tarkin refuses to believe that the Death Star is in danger from the Rebel starfighter attack. As a result, he refuses to evacuate and is subsequently killed when Luke Skywalker (Mark Hamill) destroys the Death Star by firing torpedoes into the exhaust port. Tarkin is last seen deep in thought seconds before the Death Star explodes.

==== Revenge of the Sith (2005) ====
At the end of Star Wars: Episode III – Revenge of the Sith, the final film in the Star Wars prequel trilogy, a younger version of Tarkin, played by Wayne Pygram, makes a cameo appearance overseeing the original Death Star's construction, standing beside Darth Vader (Hayden Christensen) and Emperor Palpatine (Ian McDiarmid).

==== Rogue One (2016) ====
In the film Rogue One (which takes place immediately before the events in A New Hope), Orson Krennic (Ben Mendelsohn), Director of Advanced Weapons Research for the Imperial Military, meets with Tarkin, who expresses his skepticism about Krennic's management of the Death Star project. Tarkin oversees the Death Star's first attack on the Rebellion when it is used to destroy the Holy City of the planet Jedha. Impressed, he congratulates Krennic before announcing that he is going to take command of the Death Star from that point on, pointing out security breaches that had occurred under Krennic's command (much to Krennic's chagrin). Later in the film, Tarkin is informed of a Rebel attack on Scarif, the planet where the plans to the Death Star are kept. He orders the jump to hyperspace to the planet, where an ongoing battle between the Empire and the Rebel Alliance rages. Tarkin has the Death Star target and destroy the Scarif base, killing Krennic, Jyn Erso (Felicity Jones), Cassian Andor (Diego Luna), and any other survivor of the ground battle.

=== Television series ===
==== The Clone Wars (2010–2013) ====
In the animated television series Star Wars: The Clone Wars, set during the events of the prequel trilogy, a younger Tarkin (voiced by Stephen Stanton) is depicted as a captain and later an Admiral in the Galactic Republic Navy.

In the third season, Captain Tarkin and Jedi Master Even Piell (Blair Bess) are ambushed and attacked by Separatist forces. Prisoners to the Citadel, Tarkin and Piell are freed from captivity by a rescue team. Initially pessimistic about being in enemy territory, Tarkin puts himself at odds with Jedi Knight Anakin Skywalker (Matt Lanter), but their respective opinions of each other improve when each realizes that both know Supreme Chancellor Palpatine (Ian Abercrombie). During a skirmish, Tarkin fights and attempts to execute Citadel Warden Osi Sobeck (James Arnold Taylor), but fails when Sobeck swiftly retaliates and nearly kills him. However, Tarkin is rescued just in time by Anakin's Padawan Ahsoka Tano (Ashley Eckstein).

In the fifth season, Tarkin, now an admiral, suspects Ahsoka of masterminding a terrorist attack on the Jedi Temple, and attempts to have the Padawan arrested. After Ahsoka is recaptured, Tarkin requests that the Jedi Order expel her and turn her over to the Republic so she can receive more "impartial" judgement. The Jedi concede and Ahsoka is tried before a jury of senators, with Tarkin heading the prosecution while Padmé Amidala (Catherine Taber) heads the defense. Despite Padmé's impressive defense, Tarkin casts doubt by mentioning that Ahsoka had been seen with Dark Jedi Asajj Ventress (Nika Futterman). After Tarkin and Padmé's arguments conclude and the jury reaches a verdict that Palpatine is about to read, Anakin arrives with Barriss Offee (Meredith Salenger), the real mastermind of the attack.

==== Star Wars Rebels (2014–2018) ====
In the television series Star Wars Rebels, Tarkin (voiced once again by Stanton) starts off as Governor of the Outer Rim territories, including Lothal, but eventually receives his Grand Moff title. He visits the planet Lothal to deal with its growing Rebel activity, and reprimands Minister Maketh Tua (Kath Soucie), Agent Kallus (David Oyelowo), and the Inquisitor for their repeated failures to stop the planet's Rebel cell. Tarkin has the Inquisitor execute Commandant Aresko and Taskmaster Grint (both David Shaughnessy) for their inability to deal with the cell's leader, Jedi Knight Kanan Jarrus (Freddie Prinze Jr.). Later, Tarkin sets a trap for the Rebels and manages to capture Kanan during their mission to send a message through one of the planet's communication towers. The Rebels' message gets sent out, but Tarkin then orders the tower to be destroyed. Kanan is tortured by the Inquisitor and transported to the Mustafar system aboard Tarkin's Star Destroyer. During Kanan's rescue by Rebel forces, Tarkin's Star Destroyer is destroyed, and the Inquisitor is killed. On Lothal, Tarkin introduces Agent Kallus to Darth Vader (James Earl Jones).

Taking the loss of his Star Destroyer personally, Tarkin orders that Maketh Tua be brought before him for her failure to find the Lothal rebels. Knowing the true meaning behind the summoning after the deaths of Aresko and Grint, Tua attempts to defect to the rebellion, but she is killed by Vader and Kallus before she can leave Lothal. Tarkin later appears in the season three premiere where he meets with Governor Pryce (Mary Elizabeth Glynn) regarding the Lothal Rebels. He subsequently grants her request for use of the Seventh Fleet, commanded by Grand Admiral Thrawn (Lars Mikkelsen). Tarkin appears via hologram in the season three finale, being briefed on Thrawn's imminent attack on Atollon to stymie a coordinated Rebel attack on Lothal. Towards the end of season four, he warns Thrawn that he must prove the worth of his TIE Defender program, Thrawn's prototype design of a new Imperial Star Fighter, or it will be shut down in favor of diverting resources to Krennic's "Stardust project" - which would eventually become the Death Star.

==== Star Wars: The Bad Batch (2021–2024) ====
Tarkin (voiced again by Stanton) appears in the Disney+ series Star Wars: The Bad Batch, set between the events of The Clone Wars and Rebels. In the premiere episode, "Aftermath", Admiral Tarkin arrives on Kamino to discuss with Prime Minister Lama Su if the Empire should continue to produce clone troopers, noting that conscripted soldiers would be less expensive. He later evaluates Clone Force 99, a group of genetically enhanced clone troopers also known as the Bad Batch, through a battle simulation. While impressed by their extraordinary skills, he also notices disobedience in them. He then dispatches them to the planet of Onderon to eliminate a group of refugees led by Saw Gerrera, as a test of their loyalty. When the Bad Batch disobeys orders, Tarkin has them arrested, but separates Bad Batch member Crosshair from the others after noticing that he is more loyal to the Empire. Tarkin has Kaminoan scientist Nala Se intensify the programming of Crosshair's inhibitor chip, turning him against his teammates, who escape Kamino.

Tarkin is later promoted to Governor, and in the episode "Replacements", he puts Crosshair in charge of an "elite squad" of recruited soldiers, who are then sent to finish the mission the Bad Batch had abandoned. After the mission is successful, Tarkin sees potential for conscripts. In the episode "Return to Kamino", after most Imperial personnel are evacuated from Kamino, Tarkin orders Vice Admiral Rampart to destroy all settlements on the planet, wiping out most of the Kaminoan race.

In the series finale episode "The Cavalry Has Arrived", he went with Captain Bragg and the stormtroopers to find Dr. Royce Hemlock's base destroyed.

=== Novels ===
Tarkin appears in Catalyst: A Rogue One Novel, the prequel novel to Rogue One, where Tarkin forms a rivalry with Advanced Weapons Director Orson Krennic.

==== Tarkin (2014) ====
Star Wars: Tarkin explores the title character's origins, and chronicles how he meets and aligns himself with Emperor Palpatine and Darth Vader prior to the events of A New Hope. The novel was one of the first four canon novels to be released in 2014 and 2015. Tarkin's Star Destroyer, the Executrix, is introduced; it later appears in Rogue One. In the novel, he advocates for the Tarkin Doctrine, a military system based on "the threat of force, rather than force itself". His philosophy becomes central to Imperial policy and earns him the position as the first Grand Moff in the Empire.

==== From a Certain Point of View (2017) ====
In Glen Weldon's short story "Of MSE-6 and Men", featured in the anthology From a Certain Point of View, Tarkin is revealed to have been sleeping with the stormtrooper TK-421 during the events of A New Hope, after capturing Leia Organa, but before his armour was stolen by Luke Skywalker in order to rescue Organa.

=== Legends ===
With the 2012 acquisition of Lucasfilm by The Walt Disney Company, most of the licensed Star Wars Expanded Universe material produced since the originating 1977 film Star Wars was rebranded as Star Wars Legends and declared non-canon to the franchise in April 2014.

In Legends, Tarkin appears in several novels, including Death Star, Cloak of Deception, Rogue Planet and Dark Lord: The Rise of Darth Vader. The original Marvel Star Wars comic series features a powerful superweapon called "The Tarkin" after the late Grand Moff. His protegee and lover, Natasi Daala, is later featured as a frequent antagonist in novels set after his death.

West End Games' roleplaying material describes the "Tarkin Doctrine", which emphasizes ruling "through the fear of force, rather than force itself", and has been mentioned various other times in the Star Wars canon. He is also mentioned during the New Jedi Order novel series as having been present on Zonama Sekot with Anakin Skywalker. In the comics series Darth Vader and the Lost Command, Tarkin is seen telling Vader of a missing convoy of Imperial craft and adds that his own son was in command of the convoy and is also missing.
