= Catalyst: A Rogue One Novel =

Science fiction novel by James Luceno

- Author: James Luceno
- Language: English
- Series: Star Wars
- Genre: Science fiction
- Publisher: Del Rey Books
- Publication date: Hardcover & E-book: 15 November 2016
- Publication place: United States
- Pages: Hardcover: 352
- ISBN: 978-0-345-51149-2

Star Wars: Catalyst: A Rogue One Novel is a science-fiction novel written by James Luceno that was published on November 15, 2016. It is set in the Star Wars universe and takes place in the time period from the Clone Wars to a couple years after Revenge of the Sith, serving as a prelude to the 2016 film Rogue One: A Star Wars Story, alongside the 2017 novel Rebel Rising. It relates the story of the Galactic Republic's and later the Galactic Empire's project to develop its superweapon, the Death Star. The novel serves to create a backstory both to Rogue One and the original Star Wars (1977).

Catalyst was announced in July 2016 at the Star Wars Celebration Europe event in London during a Star Wars Publishing panel session.

== Plot ==
During the Clone Wars, the Galactic Republic begins work on a moon-sized battle station. Lieutenant Commander Orson Krennic seeks to recruit acclaimed scientist Galen Erso, Krennic's close friend who may discover the breakthrough in energy enhancement needed to complete the project. Meanwhile, Erso, a neutralist, is imprisoned on the planet Vallt while working as an energy researcher for Zerpen Industries, where the planetary government was overthrown in a Separatist-aligned coup. While in prison, his pregnant wife, Lyra, gives birth to their daughter, Jyn.

Krennic masquerades as a Zerpen representative and rescues Galen, Lyra, and Jyn. Off-planet, Krennic reveals that he is with the Republic, and a Republic battleship destroys the government complex of Vallt while the Ersos watch. On Coruscant, Krennic works to convince Galen to join the project, which is under construction near Geonosis. After a stint on the planet Lokori, the Ersos return to Coruscant after the Republic reorganized into an Empire at the end of the Clone Wars. There, Krennic has been working on Project Celestial Power, a covert research project to power the project using kyber crystals.

Under the pretext of suspected anarchist activity, the Empire hires the smuggler Obitt to help take over mining corporations on the planets Samovar and Wadi Raffa. Unknown to Galen, his former colleague Dagio Belcoze has been researching energy output on the planet Malpaz. The experiments fail, causing an explosion that kills thousands. Suspicious of Lyra's intentions and influence over Galen, Krennic arranges for her to lead a survey team of the planet Alpinn to search for kyberite and kyber crystals. Following the survey, Obitt shows Lyra the depleted remains of Samovar and Wadi Raffa.

Lyra returns to Coruscant to find Galen absorbed in his research, and the Celestial project now under tight security. Galen was developing serious suspicions about the use of his energy research, but chose not to discuss it with Lyra without stronger proof. Galen continued to make breakthroughs with a boulder-size kyber, learning how to use its properties to amplify energy beams. His work led to a breakthrough and Krennic arranged to have a Star Destroyer set up with a twin laser array, which was tested successfully in deep space.

Meanwhile, Krennic had set up another smuggling mission for Obitt to the Salient system. In secret, Obitt has arranged with Saw Gerrera to warn the Salient system of the Empire's intentions, letting them prepare for an Empire invasion. After the drop, Tarkin brings a Star Destroyer to demand access to Salient, as was done on Samovar and Wadi Raffa. This time, the system starts fighting with the Empire, and destroying any facilities that the Empire can use. Tarkin's forces are tied down in battle, and he suspects that Krennic has allowed Obitt to warn the Salient system, likely as an attempt to further his career over Tarkin's.

Krennic's research team, who are unaware of the true purpose of their energy research and questions Krennic, demands to be released from the program. Krennic promises them full releases from their contracts, but instead kills them all, destroying their facility on Hypori with turbolaser blasts from his Star Destroyer. He returns to Coruscant, where he finds more evidence of suspicious behaviour by Galen and Lyra. He threatens Lyra with prosecution, which only leads to Lyra forcing a talk with Galen in secret, where they both reveal their suspicions about the project.

Tarkin is finally successful in subjugating the Salient system and captures Obitt. Obitt was severely injured in the battle, but wakes up on Tarkin's Destroyer fully healed. Under interrogation by Tarkin, Obitt reveals all of his recent activity with the Ersos and Krennic. Tarkin decides to use Obitt to strike back at Krennic.

On Coruscant, Krennic is confronted by the Ersos. Krennic leaves them, worried about their intentions when he learns that Obitt's ship has been tracked coming to Coruscant. Krennic believes that Obitt may be helping the Ersos to escape and orders the project security to hold them, but it is too late. Krennic arrives at the spaceport to confront Obitt and prevent the Ersos escape. However, Obitt has arranged for Gerrera to arrive in another ship and the Ersos leave Coruscant.

Obitt continues to work for Tarkin, reporting on Krennic's activities, while also looking for the Ersos for Krennic. Tarkin is assigned to the bases of the battle station construction to supervise security, plotting to take control of the battle station project, while Krennic is demoted for losing Galen Erso. The Ersos, meanwhile have escaped with Gerrera to the planet Lah'mu.

== Characters ==
- Galen Erso – A scientist involved in energy crystal and energy enrichment research, and an old friend of Lt. Commander Krennic.
- Lyra Erso – The wife of Galen, and the mother of Jyn.
- Lieutenant Commander Orson Krennic – Commander in the Republic Corps of Engineers, Special Weapons Group.
- Commander Wilhuff Tarkin – Adjutant General for the Republic Navy.
- Captain Has Obitt – Dressellian smuggler
- Saw Gerrera – Smuggler and former soldier.
- Archduke Poggle the Lesser – Leader of the planet of Geonosis.
- Jyn Erso – The daughter of Galen and Lyra.
- Vice Chancellor Mas Amedda – Vizier to Emperor Palpatine and overseer of the battle station's construction

== Reception ==
Den of Geek's Megan Crouse gave Catalyst a 3.5 out of 5 rating. Nerdist's Amy Ratcliff described Catalyst as an exciting read but not without its flaws. Jim Lehane of the website Adventures In Poor Taste stated Catalyst was insightful but only half the story. Books-a-Million rated the novel 4.8 out of 5.

== Publication ==
Catalyst was released in hardback and electronic versions on November 15, 2016. A mass market edition was released on May 2, 2017, the same day Disney Lucasfilm Press released Star Wars: Rebel Rising, which follows the events of Catalyst.

== Sequels ==
The conclusion of Catalyst leads into the first events of the Rogue One: A Star Wars Story novel, released in December 2016. Jyn Erso's story during the period from the prologue of Rogue One to later events in that film and novel are told in the novel Star Wars: Rebel Rising, released in hardcover in 2017.
