= Rogue One: A Star Wars Story (novel) =

2016 novel by Alexander Freed

- Author: Alexander Freed
- Audio read by: Jonathan Davis
- Language: English
- Series: Star Wars
- Genre: Science fiction
- Publisher: Del Rey Books
- Publication date: Hardcover: December 23, 2016
- Publication place: United States
- Media type: Print (Hardcover & Paperback)
- Pages: Hardcover: 352
- ISBN: 978-1780894782

Rogue One: A Star Wars Story is a novelization by Alexander Freed of the 2016 film of the same name.

== Development ==
Freed had previously written for story lines for Star Wars: The Old Republic and the novel Battlefront: Twilight Company, often focusing on the stories of "ordinary" characters. He was given access to the film script, which he divided into chapters with distinct point-of-view characters rather than using an omniscient narrator. Freed also incorporated sections of "Supplemental Data" to add a "documentary feel" comparable to the camerawork of director Gareth Edwards.

== Differences from the film ==
- In the beginning, when Galen boards the shuttle with Director Krennic, he feels a sense of remorse for what he did.
- Jyn Erso's history is slightly expanded upon in the book.
- More background details are revealed on Jyn's cellmate during her time in imperial captivity.
- The book also expands on the rivalry between Orson Krennic and Grand Moff Tarkin.
- More of the Death Star attack on Jedha city is revealed, including Imperial casualties.
- More is written from the perspective of Admiral Raddus, including a brief history of his species.
- The finale also gives more from the perspectives of each main character. The finale also offers a slight difference from the film. Instead of a male rebel, a middle aged rebel woman with a burned face hands over the data of the Death Star to Captain Antilles, who in turn hands them over to Princess Leia, leading directly to the events of A New Hope.

== Publication history ==
As was the case with the previous novelization, to avoid spoilers the hardcover book was released after the film while the ebook was available on the day of the film's US release.

== See also ==
- Catalyst: A Rogue One Novel
