= Saw Gerrera =

Character in the Star Wars franchise

- Star Wars character
- Forest Whitaker as Saw Gerrera in Rogue One (left) and a younger Gerrera as he appears in The Clone Wars
- First appearance: "A War on Two Fronts"; The Clone Wars; 2012
- Last appearance: "Jedha, Kyber, Erso"; Andor; 2025
- Created by: George Lucas
- Portrayed by: Forest Whitaker (Rogue One, Andor)
- Voiced by: Andrew Kishino (The Clone Wars, The Bad Batch); Forest Whitaker (Rebels, Jedi: Fallen Order)

In-universe information
- Occupation: Royal soldier; Rebel; Partisan
- Affiliation: Onderon Rebels; Royal Onderon Militia; Rebel Alliance; Partisans
- Family: Steela Gerrera (sister)
- Children: Jyn Erso (surrogate daughter)
- Home: Onderon

Saw Gerrera is a fictional character in the Star Wars franchise. He was first introduced in a 2012 episode of the animated series The Clone Wars, in which he is voiced by Andrew Kishino. Hailing from the planet Onderon alongside his sister, Steela, they are introduced as Onderon loyalists working to free the planet from the rule of an illegitimate king backed by the Confederacy of Independent Systems, and are mentored in military combat by the Jedi and clone troopers. While they are able to free their planet, Saw's sister is tragically killed in action. An older version of the character appears in the live-action film Rogue One (2016), played by Forest Whitaker. He is depicted as a key Rebel leader who is expelled from the Rebel Alliance due to his extreme methods, but he remains instrumental in uncovering the Death Star's existence and inspiring his protege and foster daughter, Jyn Erso, to help the Alliance.

Saw's character makes recurring appearances throughout Star Wars media; Whitaker voices Saw in the animated series Star Wars Rebels, the video game Star Wars Jedi: Fallen Order, and appears in the live-action television series Andor. Saw also appears in The Bad Batch, with Kishino reprising his role. Many of his appearances depict him as an effective soldier whose methods become extreme. Other appearances explore Gerrera's battles against the Galactic Empire and the toll they take on him mentally, as well as his relationship with the Alliance and his work uncovering the Death Star.

The character has received positive reception from critics for representing the darker aspects of the Rebel Alliance, and Whitaker's performance in both Rogue One and Andor, with the latter earning him an Outstanding Guest Actor in a Drama Series nomination at the 77th Primetime Emmy Awards.

== Concept and creation ==
Though Saw appears as an animated character in The Clone Wars, that was not the original plan for him. On the Star Wars show, Pablo Hidalgo of Lucasfilm's Story Group revealed the character's origin: "He started off before that. George Lucas had him in mind for his live-action TV series that was in development, which ultimately never happened, but he found a place to put Saw into a story in Clone Wars."

Supervising director of The Clone Wars, Dave Filoni, stated: "We wanted a brother/sister duo on Onderon, and the character Saw was a character that George had already created, and he just wanted to involve and tell a little more about that character. So in the course of that we created Steela [to be Saw's sister], who would act as a natural foil to Ahsoka."

Andrew Kishino, who voices Saw in The Clone Wars, said that the character "Has even sort of, embodied in him, that feisty spirit of the Rebellion. The take-no-garbage kind of individual. He's stoic and strong and brash. He's 'that' guy, and it's that kind of strength tempered with Steela's calm, level-headed thinking, that is, to stand up to something that will ultimately become the Empire, absolutely critical and necessary.

Saw Gerrera's name is a "mnemonic riff" on the name of Argentine Marxist revolutionary Che Guevara.

Entertainment Weekly revealed the character's appearance in Rogue One on June 22, 2016. The film's director, Gareth Edwards, had wanted a character to showcase the more "militant" and "extreme" side of the rebellion. Co-producer Kiri Hart suggested using Gerrera, a pre-established character, in this role. Gerrera appears significantly older in Rogue One than he did in The Clone Wars, despite the two works taking place only roughly twenty years apart.

== Appearances ==
=== Films and television ===
==== Star Wars: The Clone Wars ====
Saw Gerrera (voiced by Andrew Kishino) first appeared in the fifth season of Star Wars: The Clone Wars, in the Onderon arc consisting of the episodes "A War on Two Fronts", "Front Runners", "The Soft War", and "Tipping Points". The character appears in all the episodes of the arc, along with his sister, Steela Gerrera, the leader of the Onderon rebels.

Jedi Master Obi-Wan Kenobi, Jedi Knight Anakin Skywalker, and his Padawan Ahsoka Tano, along with clone trooper Captain Rex, secretly train Saw and the other members of the resistance movement in military combat but refuse to get involved in the conflict, and leave Ahsoka to supervise the operation with instructions to not fight the battle for them. Saw attempts to rescue the deposed King Ramsis Dendup from execution, only to be captured and tortured. However, he plays a vital part in the Onderon rebellion by convincing Dendup and militia General Tandin that the rebels are fighting out of loyalty to their rightful sovereign. Eventually, Saw and Steela lead the Onderon resistance to victory over the Confederacy of Independent Systems, though not without paying a heavy price for it when Steela dies saving the king. Dave Filoni, along with the writers, decided for the arc to end with the death of Steela, because in his words, he wanted to depict that "there had to be a price paid for their freedom".

==== Star Wars Rebels ====
Saw is mentioned in the Star Wars Rebels second-season episode "The Honorable Ones", as being a factor in Agent Kallus's disdain for the rebellion's tactics against the Empire and part of the reason he participated in the genocide of the Lasat race, which Ghost crew member Garazeb "Zeb" Orrelios is a member of.

Saw makes an appearance in the third season, two-part episode "Ghosts of Geonosis", with Forest Whitaker reprising his role from Rogue One in a vocal capacity. Given the continuity error of Saw having a different eye colour in Rogue One from his appearance in The Clone Wars, a mixture of the two was used to imply Gerrera's eye colour to be changing with age. In the episode, the Rebellion loses contact with Saw and his squad investigating Geonosis and decides to send the Ghost crew to rescue him. Saw saves Jedi Knight Kanan Jarrus, his Padawan Ezra Bridger, and Captain Rex from a group of battle droids. He tells them of an operational shield generator that he found, leading him to deduce that a Geonosian is still alive. Saw convinces them that they need to find the Geonosian, as it could tell them why the Empire virtually exterminated its species. They discover the Geonosian, whom Ezra names "Klik-Klak". Saw aggressively interrogates Klik-Klak and forces him to lead them to the source of an energy reading, handcuffing him as well. They reach his home, which Gerrera ransacks, suspecting him to be hiding something. The Rebels learn that Klik-Klak has been protecting an egg of his race, and take him to the Ghost for questioning. Saw resorts to torturing him with electric shock and even threatening to destroy the egg. However, upon finding more evidence of the genocide of the Geonosians by the Empire, Saw has a change of heart and lets Klik-Klak back to his lair, giving him a chance to rebuild the Geonosian population.

Saw reappears in the fourth season's two-part episode "In the Name of the Rebellion", which is set shortly before the events of Rogue One. He gives information on a new Imperial relay station to the Rebel Alliance, and condemns their unwillingness to do whatever it takes to win, blaming it as the reason for their losses. He later rescues Ezra and Sabine Wren during their mission to assist him in learning about the Empire's super weapon, which he has been investigating since his mission to Geonosis. They board an Imperial freighter, where they find a giant Kyber Crystal that the Empire is shipping. Ezra and Sabine try to pull the ship out of hyperspace out of concern for the prisoners aboard, but Saw, desperate to find out about the Empire's plans, stuns them. Though learning the weapon is powered by Kyber Crystals, Saw reaches a dead end. To prevent the Empire from obtaining the crystal, he causes it to begin absorbing energy until it explodes. Before fleeing, Saw offers Ezra a chance to join him. Ezra chooses to stay with the Alliance.

==== Rogue One: A Star Wars Story ====
Saw makes his first live-action appearance in Rogue One: A Star Wars Story, portrayed by Forest Whitaker. Within the film, Gerrera leads the Partisans, an extremist rebel faction unaffiliated with the Rebel Alliance due to his violent tactics, on the planet Jedha. He plays on the frequent theme of duality between light and dark, a Rebel foil of Darth Vader whose body is mostly mechanized and who uses extreme methods in pursuit of his goals.

Saw is Jyn Erso's mentor, having rescued and adopted her as a child when her father Galen was abducted by Orson Krennic, the Imperial military director of weapons research. In the present, defecting Imperial pilot Bodhi Rook travels to Jedha to deliver a holographic message from Galen to Saw. Believing it to be a deception, Gerrera tortures him with Bor Gullet, a mind-reading, octopus-like creature, and holds Rook captive. Gerrera has a reunion with Jyn on Jedha, where it is revealed he abandoned her years earlier as it was dangerous for him to keep her around, though he later regrets it. He passes along Galen's message and watches it with Jyn, learning about a weakness in the Death Star. Meanwhile, the Death Star fires on Jedha City; while Jyn and her rebel companions escape, Gerrera chooses to stay and is killed when his hideout is annihilated in the wake of the blast. Krennic later boasts to Galen that Gerrera and his band of fanatics are dead.

==== Star Wars: The Bad Batch ====
Saw appears in The Clone Wars spin-off Star Wars: The Bad Batch's premiere episode, with Andrew Kishino returning to voice the character. He is shown leading a band of Onderon refugees from the Empire when the Bad Batch is dispatched to eliminate them as "insurgents" by Admiral Tarkin to test their loyalties. After realizing the truth behind the mission, the Bad Batch let Gerrera and his people leave peacefully. Saw reappears in the second-season episode "The Summit", with a plan to blow up the highly secure meeting place of Tarkin and his cronies. The plan goes awry and ultimately results in the death of Bad Batch member Tech.

==== Andor ====
Whitaker reprised his role as Saw Gerrera in the Rogue One spin-off prequel series Andor, which begins five years before the events of Rogue One.

In the episode "Narkina 5", Luthen Rael travels to meet with Saw at the Partisans' base on Segra Milo, and invites him to join a raid led by rebel leader Anto Kreegyr on an Imperial power station on the planet Spellhaus. Gerrera declines on the basis of Kreegyr being a former Separatist. In "One Way Out", Rael learns from his Imperial contact, Lonni Jung, that the Imperial Security Bureau (ISB) is aware of Kreegyr's plans. Acting on Jung's information would compromise Jung's identity, so Rael reluctantly decides to sacrifice all 30 of Kreegyr's men to keep Jung's activity secret. Later, in "Daughter of Ferrix", Gerrera agrees to join the raid on Spellhaus at the last minute. Rael informs him that the ISB is aware of the raid, and Gerrera chastises him for being willing to sacrifice Kreegyr, asking what would happen if it were he instead. Gerrera grows suspicious of Rael, wondering if one of the Partisans has been compromised, too. Eventually, Gerrera reluctantly agrees to keep Kreegyr in the dark. In the season finale "Rix Road", the ISB learns that the ambush was a success, and Kreegyr and all of his men have been killed.

Gerrera reappears in the second arc of the second season, in the episodes "Ever Been to Ghorman?" and "I Have Friends Everywhere." The young rebel Wilmon Paak has been sent by Luthen to Saw's Partisan base on D'Qar to show them how to use a machine to extract rhydonium fuel, which the Partisans plan to steal from the Empire. Wilmon planned to return to his friends, but Saw refuses to let him leave, requiring him to teach every variation of the extraction process (different at every Imperial station) to Pluti, one of his Partisans. Saw tells his comrades that he plans to kill Wilmon once he has taught Pluti the information, but Pluti asks Saw which station they plan to attack, saying he wants to focus on remembering that sequence. When Wilmon later determines that Pluti is ready, Saw holds Wilmon at gunpoint as he questions him, only to shoot Pluti instead, having deduced from his question that Pluti was an Imperial informant. Saw then reveals to his men that he gave Pluti the name of a different station to misdirect the Empire, leaving their actual target undefended. Due to Wilmon being the only one who knows the sequences, he is forced to accompany the Partisans on the mission.

At the Imperial station, Wilmon works on the extractor alone with Saw. Saw tells Wilmon a story of when he was a young man in an Imperial labor camp in the Onderon jungle, when they discovered a rhydonium leak, which is burning and corrosive, but he found it intriguing. When Wilmon finishes the sequence, releasing some rhydonium into the air, Saw sniffs some of it. Wilmon, wearing a gas mask, asks Saw how he can do that. Saw replies that he understands the rhydonium, calling it his sister and saying he knows the feeling of wanting to explode. He gives an impassioned speech to Wilmon, telling him the importance of being there in the fight and admitting that he is crazy, but that "Revolution is not for the sane." When Wilmon pulls his gas mask off, screaming at both the sensation of the gas and his anger at the Empire, Saw encourages him to "let it in, let it run wild."

Saw reappears in the series finale "Jedha, Kyber, Erso", where he is in a conference with Mon Mothma, Davits Draven, and Bail Organa, with Mothma objecting to the Partisans' hijacking of Imperial transports over Jedha, while Saw objects to the Rebel Alliance's interference. She counters that the Empire dispatched a Star Destroyer to Jedha, after which Saw angrily cuts the transmission. During the epilogue montage at the end of the episode, Saw is seen watching the Star Destroyer hovering over Jedha City from his base, leading directly into the events of Rogue One.

=== Novels ===
Saw appears in the novelization of Rogue One, written by Alexander Freed. He also appears alongside a seven-year-old Jyn Erso in the novelization of the film Solo: A Star Wars Story, in which his short appearance reveals that Enfys Nest was stealing the fuel for Saw. He is mentioned in the novel Star Wars: Bloodline, set six years before the events of Star Wars: The Force Awakens, where it is noted that his methods of combating the Empire are viewed as having been "extreme".

==== Catalyst: A Rogue One Novel ====
Gerrera appears in Catalyst: A Rogue One Novel, which details how he came to meet Galen, Lyra and Jyn Erso.

==== Rebel Rising ====
Gerrera appears in the novel Rebel Rising by Beth Revis. The book's events take place between Catalyst: A Rogue One Novel and the beginning of Rogue One. Within the novel, Gerrera raises Jyn Erso as his foster daughter, mentoring her in combat and insurgent tactics. Throughout the book, Gerrera and his Partisans navigate through their relations with the forming Rebel Alliance while Saw himself investigates the significance of kyber crystals, a mineral the Empire has worked to capture in recent years. He is also protective of Jyn's identity, suspecting the Partisans would use her as bait if they knew she was the daughter of an Imperial engineer. Tensions rise as members of the Partisans realize Jyn's connection, and Saw's fear comes into fruition when he is later betrayed by his other protégé, Reece Tallent. Gerrera is forced to abandon Jyn for her safety.

==== Reign of the Empire: The Mask of Fear ====
Saw appears as a main character in the first installment of the Reign of the Empire series, taking place in the first year of the Galactic Empire's reign. Adjacent to his portrayal in The Bad Batch, Saw is revealed to have garnered a reputation as a hero, but his acts of resistance have drawn the attention of the Empire.

Within the novel, Gerrera and his rebel band raid former Separatist holds and bases in search of weaponry and supplies, and encounter a former Separatist assassin, Soujen Vak-Nhalis, whose aid Saw manages to secure despite their differences. Gerrera meets Bail Organa during his efforts to exonerate the Jedi Order, enlisting Soujen and Saw's aid in return for Senatorial access, which leads to the bombing of Center One, a re-education center that the Empire disguises as a refueling station to frame Gerrera and his militia as Onderonian terrorists. Saw later meets with Organa and Mon Mothma, and they form an unofficial alliance despite their differences. However, to cover his connections to Gerrera, Organa feigns support for the Empire by advocating for Mothma's Imperial Rebirth Act, which would limit Palpatine's executive power as Emperor but also boost protections for worlds under Imperial occupation. Gerrera is used as a scapegoat by Organa to ensure the bill is passed, and as a result he becomes the Empire's most wanted fugitive.

=== Video games ===
==== Star Wars Jedi: Fallen Order ====
Gerrera appears in Star Wars Jedi: Fallen Order, again voiced by Forest Whitaker. Despite the game's events taking place only five years after The Clone Wars, Gerrera is visibly older, resembling his appearance in Star Wars Rebels and Rogue One. He is first seen on Kashyyyk alongside his Partisans attempting to liberate the Wookiees from Imperial occupation. During his quest to find the Wookiee chieftain Tarfful, Cal Kestis encounters Gerrera and his men, who ask for his help in freeing the Wookiees in exchange for tracking down Tarfful. Gerrera's men eventually find Tarfful, but are overwhelmed by Imperial forces and retreat. By the time Cal returns to Kashyyyk to meet with Tarfful, Gerrera has left the planet, though some of his Partisans stayed behind to continue assisting the Wookiees.
