= Cassian Andor =

Character in the Star Wars franchise

- Star Wars character
- Diego Luna as Cassian Andor in the 2016 film Rogue One
- First appearance: Rogue One (2016)
- Last appearance: "Jedha, Kyber, Erso"; Andor (2025)
- Created by: John Knoll
- Portrayed by: Diego Luna (Rogue One, Andor); Antonio Viña (young) (Andor)
- Voiced by: André Sogliuzzo (Lego Star Wars: All Stars)

In-universe information
- Full name: Cassian Jeron Andor; Kassa (birth name)
- Aliases: Clem; Keef Girgo; Varian Skye; Ronni Googe; Fulcrum
- Species: Human
- Gender: Male
- Affiliation: Axis network; Rebel Alliance
- Family: Kerri (sister); Clem Andor (adoptive father, deceased); Maarva Andor (adoptive mother, deceased); Unnamed child
- Significant other: Bix Caleen
- Homeworld: Kenari; Ferrix (adoptive)

Cassian Jeron Andor is a fictional character in the Star Wars franchise, primarily portrayed by Mexican actor Diego Luna. Introduced in the feature film Rogue One (2016) as a co-lead, he is the titular protagonist of the prequel television series Andor (2022–2025).

He begins his life as an orphan on the abandoned mining planet Kenari. After being adopted and taken from his home by scavengers, he grows up on the industrial planet Ferrix. As a young man, he smuggles stolen Imperial ship components before joining the Rebel Alliance. Rogue One depicts Andor as a pilot and intelligence officer for the Rebel Alliance who leads a rebel unit called Rogue One in stealing plans for the Death Star, setting the events of the original Star Wars film in motion.

The character has received a mixed response from critics, with praise for Luna's performance but some criticism for the quality of the narrative guiding the character. As the first Mexican lead actor and one of the first Latino leads in a Star Wars film, his introduction in Rogue One was considered to be a milestone for Latino representation.

== Character ==
=== Creation ===
Though not initially named Cassian Andor, a "Cassian Andor–type character" appeared in the original treatment of Rogue One written by John Knoll, chief creative officer at Industrial Light & Magic and in the first draft of the script written by Gary Whitta. The character was created as a member of Rogue One, then commanded by a Rebel Alliance sergeant version of Jyn Erso. The original intention was to kill all members of the Rogue One team, including Cassian. However, fearing that Disney would not allow the ending, Knoll and Whitta wrote that Cassian escapes Scarif with the Death Star plans alongside Jyn Erso and, though their ship is destroyed by Darth Vader after they transfer the plans to Princess Leia, they narrowly survive in an escape pod. Whitta stated that having to "jump through so many hoops" to ensure survival indicated that Cassian and Jyn should die on Scarif. Producer Kathleen Kennedy and Disney ultimately approved the ending in which the entire crew dies. The main purpose of this action was believed to be for the characters to be ultimately replaced after the film by the crew of the original trilogy.

Tony Gilroy stated that the inspiration for Cassian's role in funding the rebellion comes from the book Young Stalin by Simon Sebag Mantefiore.

=== Casting and portrayal ===
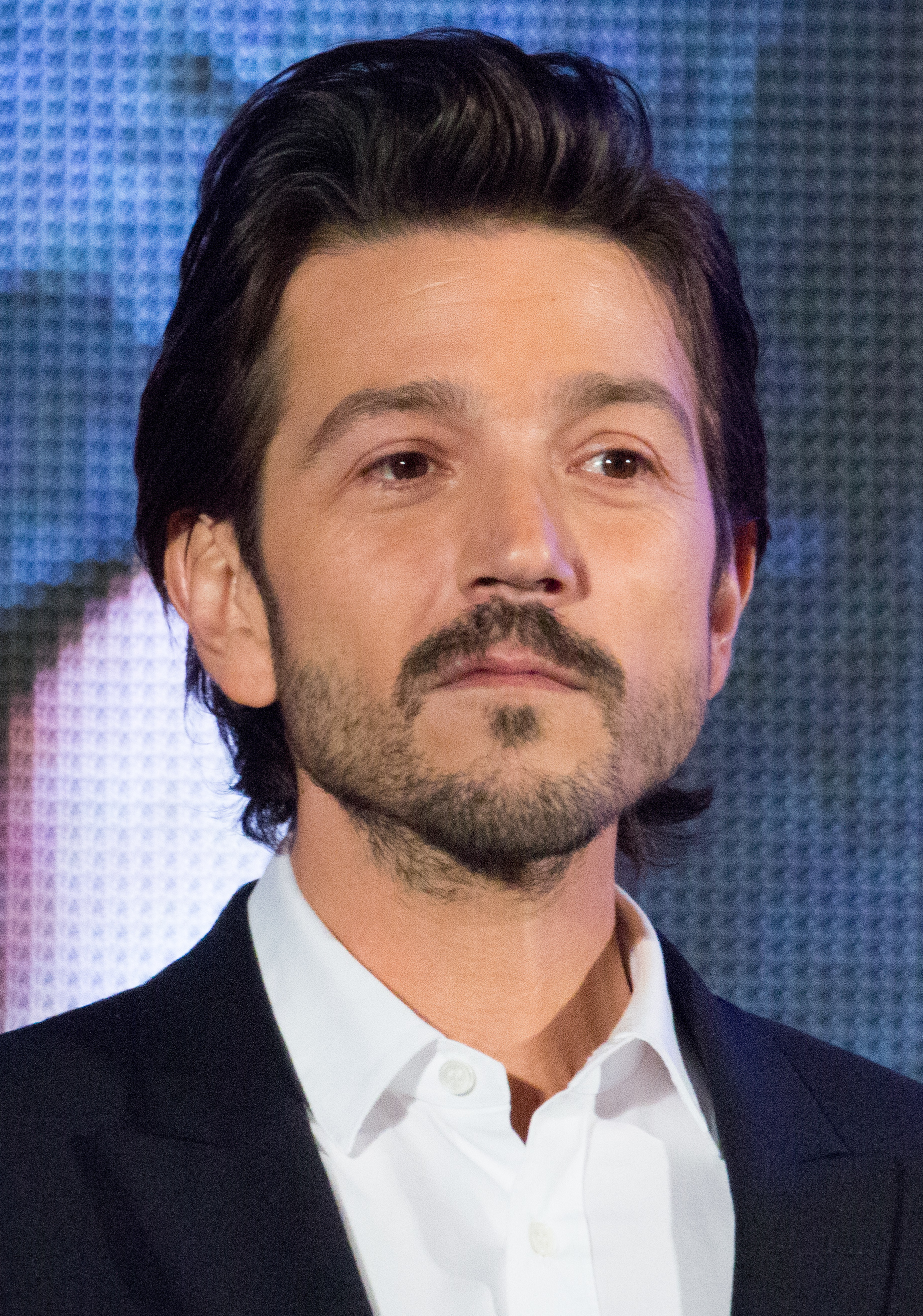
Diego Luna portrays the character of Cassian Andor in Rogue One and Andor.

In May 2015, it was announced that Diego Luna had been cast in a lead role in Rogue One. Director Gareth Edwards wanted Cassian to be warm and likeable rather than the typical stoic, brooding action hero, leading to Edwards' decision to cast Luna early on. He was impressed by Luna's background in small, character-driven productions, especially as he wanted the film to tell a more personal story than previous Star Wars installments. Luna felt that his casting—and the casting of other actors who may be non-white and/or whose mother tongue is a language other than English—in the films' leading roles reflected a "modern approach" and a world in which "racial and cultural diversity is in fact making us richer and more interesting."

In his portrayal of the character, Luna speaks with his own, natural Mexican accent—a rarity for a franchise which has mostly featured actors with American or British accents. Luna stated that his accent was not an issue with the film's producers, who were happy with it. Luna also dubbed Andor's dialogue for the Spanish-language version of the film; the dub was recorded in Mexico City months before the film's theatrical release.

While filming Rogue One, Luna developed a personal backstory for Cassian to help him get into character. In an interview with Entertainment Weekly, he stated that he incorporated Mexican cultural influences into the character's backstory. He imagined the character to come from a "marginalized" background as a way to explain his unique accent in the Star Wars universe. He stated this backstory resonated with Andor showrunner Tony Gilroy, who also wanted to explain the character's distinctive accent.

In November 2018, it was reported that Luna would reprise his role in the Disney+ series Andor, which was released in 2022. A young version of Cassian is portrayed by Antonio Viña in the show's first season. Luna once again dubbed the character for the Spanish-language version of Andor, which also features co-star Adria Arjona voicing her own character.

=== Backstory and development ===
He's a man forced to migrate and has to leave everything behind. And there's a hint of that in 'Rogue One.' No one has his accent. Clearly, he comes from somewhere no one else has come from ... we're talking about marginalized communities. We're talking about [what] oppression looks like. And obviously, there is a lot of parallels you can establish with the world [we] live in.

— Luna, in an interview quoted by The Washington Post.

For Andor, Luna and the writers of the series both sought to expand on Cassian's backstory and explore how he became the rebel leader portrayed in Rogue One. At the beginning of the series, Cassian is more childish and shortsighted than the character in Rogue One. At the beginning of his story, Gilroy imagined Cassian as being motivated by anger rather than ideology. According to Gilroy, the first season of Andor takes a "completely disillusioned and completely self-interested" character and follows his development into someone fully dedicated to the Rebellion's cause. Luna said that the series was ultimately about change and transformation.

In Andor, Cassian is established to be a refugee who was separated from his culture and community on the indigenous planet of Kenari by the Galactic Empire's oppressive regime. Unlike most humans in the Star Wars universe, the inhabitants of Kenari do not speak "Galactic Basic", the common language of the Galaxy, explaining Cassian's accent. The series retcons Cassian's prior backstory as established in Star Wars: Rogue One: The Ultimate Visual Guide, which claimed that he was born on Fest. In the series, he has falsified documents which claim Fest as his birthplace.

Luna and Gilroy saw this backstory as a way to establish Cassian's alienation and resentment for the Empire. Gilroy stated that the loss of his home explained Cassian's coldblooded commitment to the Rebellion, saying he wanted to "allow [Cassian] to do some very unpleasant things along the way and yet you still not reject him." Cassian's unjust incarceration and the execution of his adopted father contributes to his hatred of the Empire, and he dedicates himself to resisting the Empire after being imprisoned on Narkina-5. By the end of the first season, Cassian has gradually transformed into a committed rebel.

== Appearances ==
=== Rogue One ===
Rogue One: A Star Wars Story was released in December 2016, featuring Luna in the role of Cassian Andor, a man who had been fighting in the Rebellion since he was six years old. In the film, Cassian learns about the defection of Imperial pilot Bodhi Rook and the superweapon known as the Death Star from Rebel informant Tivik, whom he kills to avoid his capture since he is unable to escape due to an injured arm. Cassian is later secretly ordered to find and assassinate scientist Galen Erso, who was captured by Director Orson Krennic and forced to help build the Death Star.

Andor and his co-pilot, reprogrammed Imperial security droid K-2SO, lead a mission to spring Galen's daughter Jyn Erso from Imperial custody so that they can make contact with Saw Gerrera. Then Andor, K-2S0, and Jyn travel to Jedha to visit Saw and obtain a message from Galen which was carried by Rook. Later, the Rebels arrive on Eadu after learning that Galen is there; Cassian hesitantly chooses not to kill him. He ultimately leads a team with Jyn to steal the plans for the Death Star on Scarif, where he infiltrates its Imperial data center with Jyn and K-2SO. After K-2SO sacrifices himself, Jyn and Cassian obtain the schematics, but they are ambushed by Krennic, who shoots Cassian. However, Andor recovers and shoots and wounds Krennic before Jyn successfully transmits the plans to the Rebel forces in orbit. The Death Star then fires upon the planet, killing Cassian and Jyn as they embrace.

=== Andor ===
Luna reprises his role as Andor in Andor, a live-action spy thriller series for Disney+, which is set five years before Rogue One and which premiered September 21, 2022.

==== Season 1 ====
In the first season of Andor, it is revealed that Cassian was an orphan named Kassa from Kenari, a former mining planet abandoned by the Empire whose indigenous inhabitants lead a tribal lifestyle. He was adopted by scavengers Clem and Maarva and raised on Ferrix, a planet whose primary activity is heavy industry. At the age of 13, Cassian witnessed Clem being killed by Imperials. He attacked a group of stormtroopers in retaliation and was sent to an Imperial youth center for three years.

Cassian later began stealing ship components and other valuable technology from the Empire with his former lover Bix Caleen. These activities bring him to the attention of the rebel leader Luthen Rael. Cassian, who is wanted for the murder of two corporate security guards, agrees to join Luthen's operation. He is sent to the planet of Aldhani to help a group of rebels steal the Imperial payroll stored there. After the heist, he takes his payment and returns to Ferrix for Maarva and their droid B2EMO. She refuses to leave her home behind, revealing that she is a rebel and was inspired by reports of an attack on Aldhani. Cassian reluctantly leaves her behind and goes to the tropical planet Niamos.

Luthen decides to kill Cassian to keep his identity secret and sends Cassian's teammates from Aldhani to kill him. ISB supervisor Dedra Meero also searches for Cassian, who she believes is connected to a mysterious rebel leader codenamed Axis, who unbeknownst to her, is Luthen. Both the Empire and the Rebellion plant spies on Ferrix in an attempt to trap Cassian. While on Niamos, Cassian is harassed by a shoretrooper who falsely accuses him of vandalism. He is arrested and sentenced to six years on the prison planet Narkina 5. Conditions on Narkina 5 are brutal: Prisoners work 12-hour shifts building components for an unknown machine (later revealed to be joints for the Death Star's superlaser dish), and electric shocks delivered through the metal floor are used to discipline them. After learning that prisoners are not released at the end of their sentences, and that the prison electrocuted one hundred men, Cassian leads a successful prison uprising.

Returning to Niamos, Cassian attempts to call Ferrix and learns that Maarva died while he was in prison. Luthen learns of this and travels to Ferrix, believing Cassian will return for her funeral. Despite the risks, Cassian returns only to learn that Bix has been tortured and imprisoned by Imperial occupiers. He rescues her while the people of Ferrix stage a local rebellion. After ensuring that Bix, B2EMO and his friend Brasso can safely escape Ferrix, he goes to Luthen's ship and offers himself up. Rather than kill him, Luthen agrees to take him back into the Rebellion.

==== Season 2 ====
One year after the events of Season 1, Cassian is a spy working on behalf of Luthen. He participates in the theft of a TIE Avenger prototype from a test facility, but is shortly afterwards captured by a rebel group on Yavin IV who believe he is an Imperial pilot. As in-fighting breaks out between the disorganized rebels, Cassian escapes with the TIE returning to the planet Mina-Rau where Bix, B2EMO, Brasso and Wilmon resettled after leaving Ferrix. The Empire is conducting a census on Mina-Rau and violence breaks out when Bix kills an Imperial officer who attempts to rape her, and in the ensuing chaos Cassian saves Bix and Wilmon with the TIE Avenger; but not before Brasso is killed by stormtroopers.

The following year, Cassian and Bix are living together in a safe-house on Coruscant, where Bix is suffering PTSD from the torture she received from Dr. Gorst previously on Ferrix. Luthen sends Cassian to the planet Ghorman undercover as a fashion designer to investigate the Empire's growing interest in the planet. After contacting the local rebel front, Cassian advises Luthen against supporting the Ghorman rebels, noting he believes them to be too inexperienced. Luthen chastises Cassian for being shortsighted, believing the potential for violence in Ghorman could rally the rebel cause. Luthen provides Cassian and Bix with information on the location of Gorst, and Bix with Cassian's help kills Gorst and destroys his facility.

One year later, Cassian has joined the nascent Yavin rebel cell. Luthen clandestinely contacts Cassian asking for him to return to Ghorman. There on Ghorman, Cassian witnesses a massacre as the Empire under the direction of Dedra Meero executes a false flag operation against the native population. During the massacre, Cassian re-encounters Syril Karn, a former corporate guard who had been hunting for Cassian over the previous years; and in the process had become romantically involved with Dedra acting as a double agent spying on the Ghorman rebels on behalf of the Empire. After a heated fist-fight, Cassian acts incredulously towards Karn failing to recognize him; before Karn is gunned down during the massacre. KX droids are deployed by the Empire during the massacre and Cassian salvages a damaged K-2SO from the fight returning the droid to Yavin IV.

Cassian is contacted shortly afterwards by Luthen to rescue Mon Mothma from the Imperial Senate, following her giving a public speech condemning Emperor Palpatine. Cassian successfully extracts Mothma from the senate building, before transferring her to Gold Squadron who will escort her to Yavin IV. Returning to Yavin, Cassian expresses his desire to leave the rebellion behind. Bix, secretly pregnant with Cassian's child; chooses to leave Yavin IV in the night; leaving behind a video message stating her hope to reunite with Cassian after the end of the war and encouraging him to remain committed to the rebellion. Shortly after Bix's departure, rebel technicians repair and reactivate K-2SO who joins Cassian.

In the days leading up to the Battle of Yavin, Cassian receives a distress call from Luthen's secret communication network. Arriving in Coruscant with K-2SO and Ruescott Melshi, Cassian finds Luthen's assistant Kleya hidden in a safe house. Kleya relays that Luthen had discovered the Empire was developing a superweapon just before Meero closed on Luthen's operation; and that Luthen committed suicide with Kleya's assistance to protect his discovery. Cassian and Melshi escort Kleya to safety, with the aid of K-2SO neutralizing Imperial soldiers. Upon returning to Yavin IV, Cassian is confined to quarters by General Draven for his unauthorized rescue mission. The Rebel Alliance council doubts Cassian's report of an Imperial superweapon, with Mon Mothma advocating her trust in Cassian and in Luthen. Draven receives a message from Rebel informant Tivik, requesting Cassian meet him in person; corroborating Luthen's information on the Imperial weapon project. As Cassian leaves Yavin IV with K-2SO to rendezvous with Tivik, it is revealed to the audience that Bix has returned to Mina-Rau where she is living safely with B2EMO, holding her and Cassian's child in her arms.

=== Related works and merchandising ===
Cassian appears in a number of related works, some of which differ from the film and television canon. He appears in the film novelization of Rogue One by Alexander Freed. In the novel, he is established to have come from a family of Separatists who resisted the Galactic Republic during the Clone Wars. In the Ultimate Star Wars New Edition, he is described as having been "battle-hardened" by his Separatist action during the Clone Wars before being recruited into the Rebellion by General Davits Draven. Star Wars: Rogue One: The Ultimate Visual Guide describes his involvement with insurrectionary cells and anarchist movements in his youth. He also appears in Star Wars: Secrets of the Empire, a virtual reality experience produced by ILMxLAB and The VOID for the Disneyland Resort and Walt Disney World; Luna reprises his role as Cassian to provide mission briefings and deliver orders throughout the experience.

== Reception ==
Cassian's story is not a straightforward march to martyrdom; it's uneven, twisted by those more powerful than him. He's caught in a cycle of violence that yields more violence.

— Shirley Li, The Atlantic

=== Film and television ===
The character's appearances in Rogue One and Andor have received mixed reviews from critics, who were divided on the quality of his narrative. Luna's performance in Rogue One garnered a mixed reception, while his performance in Andor was more well received.

==== Rogue One ====
Justin Chang of the Los Angeles Times praised Luna's "flinty charisma" in Rogue One, and David Ehrlich of IndieWire wrote that the character was "a bit lost between archetypes, but he's charming enough." Ann Hornaday of The Washington Post wrote that "the fey, soft-spoken Luna is particularly ill-suited to play a rakish man of adventure". Praising Felicity Jones in the role of Jyn Erso, Chris Nashawaty wrote in Entertainment Weekly, "I wish Luna had a little more personality, a little more Han Solo swagger, to match her."

Many critics and authors commented on the character's ruthless and cynical personality, especially in comparison to other Star Wars protagonists. Cassian's murder of an informant at the beginning of Rogue One is often considered to be a defining moment for the character. Eric Goldman of IGN wrote that "Luna projects innate charisma mixed with ongoing unease, as we see [Cassian] participate in actions he's not always proud of in service of the greater good."

Luna, reflecting on the events of Rogue One, has stated that Cassian's willingness to kill is a symptom of living under oppression.

Terrance MacMullan in "Rebellions are Built on Hope", describes Cassian as a "complex" but ultimately good character, whose faith in his comrades is a core part of the film's philosophy. To MacMullan, Cassian's murder of the informant distinguishes Rogue One's more nuanced philosophy from the clear good against evil conflicts of the Original Trilogy. Macmullan commented that:

Having to witness the daring Cassian Andor murder a fellow Rebel in cold blood nearly inverts the famous line from the crawl of Revenge of The Sith: while the battles of the Clone Wars taught us that "there are heroes on both sides," Rogue One makes us wonder if "there are villains on both sides."

==== Andor ====
The character's portrayal in Andor received mixed reviews from critics, with some complimenting his character development over the first season, while others considered his narrative to be a weak point of the otherwise well received show. Sarah Odman, in a review for The Hollywood Reporter, praised Cassian's transformation "from a disenfranchised criminal to a man who looks more like the ruthless Rebel leader they remember."

Roxana Hadadi of Vulture and Joshua Rivera of Polygon both praised the character's expanded history and Luna's performance. Shirley Li, writing for The Atlantic, commented that the series "depicts how an ordinary, disillusioned character can undergo a political awakening in just a few short years."

Critic Alan Sepinwall of Rolling Stone described this arc as a "hero's journey" while opining that it was the least compelling part of Andor's first season. He wrote that the character is "never dramatized in a particularly interesting way beyond [Luna's] performance". Mike Hale, writing for The New York Times, made similar criticisms of the character, who he described as a thinly written "Humphrey Bogart-style cynical romantic". Ryan Britt, in a review for Den of Geek, wrote that the character had unclear motivations and a lack of agency in the first season that made its finale unsatisfying.

Some critics have considered the story arc in which Cassian is imprisoned on Narkina-5 to be a commentary on exploitation in the prison-industrial complex. Tracy Brown and Jamil Smith of the Los Angeles Times felt that the arc was a timely exploration of mass incarceration.

==== Latino representation ====
Cassian is the first Star Wars character portrayed by a Mexican actor and one of the first Latino lead characters in a Star Wars film. His appearances in Rogue One and Andor are considered milestones in the history of racial diversity and Latino representation in the Star Wars franchise. Yara Simón, in an article for Remezcla, described Cassian as "the Latino hero we deserve, and the Latino actor who has had the most prominent role in any of the eight Star Wars films released in the last 39 years."

After the release of the theatrical trailer for Rogue One, the film was praised for not masking Luna's Mexican accent. Caroline Framske of Vox wrote that "getting to see a Star Wars hero save the day with a distinctive Mexican accent is a huge deal — especially for audiences who rarely see themselves reflected onscreen in a role that isn't a tiny part or, worse, the butt of some joke."

Writing for Latino Rebels, Cristina Escobar wrote that "the question of whether Cassian is Latino is a thorny one." She observed that geopolitical categories like Latinx do not exist in the science fiction universe of Star Wars, and wrote that essentializing the Latino experience "reduce[d] [Latin people] to a set of traits we don't all share".

=== Books ===
In Why We Love Star Wars: The Great Moments That Built a Galaxy Far, Far Away, Ken Napzok described Cassian's characterization in Freed's Rogue One novelization as part of the more nuanced and realistic portrayal of the Rebellion in later Star Wars installments. In a review of the novel for New York Daily News, Sean Keane wrote that "Fans will be happy to see that [Cassian] carries the weight of his questionable actions throughout the story."
