= Luthen Rael =

Fictional character

- Star Wars character Andor character
- Stellan Skarsgård as Luthen Rael in the Andor episode "Aldhani"
- First appearance: "That Would Be Me"; (2022)
- Last appearance: "Make It Stop"; (2025)
- Created by: Tony Gilroy
- Portrayed by: Stellan Skarsgård

In-universe information
- Full name: Luthen Rael; Lear (birth name)
- Alias: Axis
- Species: Human
- Gender: Male
- Occupation: Antiques dealer Spymaster
- Affiliation: Axis network Rebel Alliance
- Homeworld: Fondor

Luthen Rael is a fictional character in the Star Wars franchise portrayed by Stellan Skarsgård in the Disney+ television series Andor. Introduced in the series' second episode, Luthen is a spymaster for the Axis Network, a clandestine faction that works to unite several conflicting factions into one rebel group in an attempt to restore the Galactic Republic and destroy the Galactic Empire. He recruits series protagonist Cassian Andor into the rebellion by including him on a team to rob an Imperial vault on Aldhani. He is also seen associating with Senator Mon Mothma, who secretly funds his operation, and extremist anti-Imperial partisan Saw Gerrera.

Publicly, Luthen poses as an antiques dealer on Coruscant with his partner and associate Kleya Marki. Throughout the show, he is known to the Empire as the mysterious Axis and is hunted down by ISB supervisor Dedra Meero. Later episodes reveal his past as an Imperial army trooper and his real name to be Lear, showing how he deserted the Empire and rescued Marki, a young war orphan, in the process.

Following his appearance in Andor, Luthen received critical acclaim by critics, with many often regarding him as one of the best characters in the series, with particular praise towards Skarsgård's performance, his character arc, and his moral complexity.

== Concept and creation ==
Andor creator Tony Gilroy found Luthen Rael's secret identity to be tricky and worried it would be too 'cheesy'. He viewed Luthen as a talent scout for the Rebellion and one of the original founders, finding it important to tell the story of uniting different rebel factions, and pronouncing Luthen as an "OG" of the rebellion.

Luthen's past as a sergeant in the Imperial army was determined very early on by Gilroy who didn't want a revenge story for Luthen, claiming "I see that in some of the other characters, and I think that's the one I don't want." A 'variety' of potential backstories that Gilroy had created were discussed with actor Stellan Skarsgård, with the two ultimately choosing to base Luthen's backstory around his relationship with Kleya Marki (portrayed by Elizabeth Dulau) after seeing the dynamic between Skarsgård and Dulau, and in an attempt to give Dulau, who they believed to be a talented actress, more screen time "to her and the character the opportunity to spread their wings." Dulau has compared Luthen and Kleya's relationship in the flashback sequences to the protagonists of the 1973 film Paper Moon, while also noticing a similarity between the two and Joel and Ellie from The Last of Us franchise.

Costume designer Michael Wilkinson designed both of Luthen's costumes, the outfit he wears as an antiques dealer and the one he wears as "Axis". The former includes a wig that Luthen wears when working in the antiques store or in other public places around Coruscant and Chandrilla. The wig, described by James Grebey, is a "demarcation between his public and private lives" as well as stating that "even when he's wearing the wig and playing the part, Luthen is still working towards rebellion. He is always listening for rumors, always looking out for possible threats. The wig is aesthetic." Artist Chester Carr and production designer Luke Hull would later create concept art based on Wilkinson's original designs, with Hull creating concept art of Luthen and Vel Sartha watching Cassian Andor leave his ship on Aldhani.

Writer on the show Beau Willimon pushed for Skarsgård to play the character, leading to Gilroy approaching the actor. Skarsgård was drawn to the character due to his morally ambiguous role, claiming:

People don't know if he's a good guy or a bad guy, which I really like, because none of us are really good guys or bad guys. He does really terrible things, but so does any general. He sacrifices people for a cause — and so does every military. But is it the right cause? You don't know. And often you don't know until much later if it was the right cause. So this ambiguity, the grey zones, I'm very interested in.

== Character biography ==
=== Early life ===
Lear was an Imperial swamp trooper from the planet Fondor who became a Sergeant. On a mission, Lear defects from the Empire and rescues a young girl from the battlefield who had stowed upon his ship. Lear renames himself and the girl "Luthen Rael" and "Kleya Marki" respectively. The two begin a rebellion against the Empire, beginning on Emperor Palpatine's home world of Naboo.

=== Andor ===
==== Season 1 ====
By 5 BBY, Luthen and Kleya run an antiques store on Coruscant and have begun an underground rebel network with the help of funding from senator Mon Mothma. Luthen receives a call from contact Bix Caleen on Ferrix, who informs him of an Imperial Starpath Unit up for sale. Luthen arrives on Ferrix and meets with the seller Cassian Andor in an abandoned factory. While Cassian wants to sell the starpath unit and leave Ferrix, due to Pre-Mor Security officers arriving on the planet to arrest Cassian for two murders, Luthen tries recruiting Cassian into his rebel network. As the officers close in on Cassian, he helps Luthen flee to his ship and joins him as they escape the planet and travel to Aldhani. Luthen drops Cassian off with a group of thieves, led by another one of his contacts Vel Sartha, with plans for Vel to lead a robbery mission on the planet.

Two days pass and Luthen hears that the robbery was a success, which leads to him quietly celebrating in the back of the antiques store. Just as he had planned, the Imperial Security Bureau (ISB) tightens their security and authority. ISB officer Dedra Meero begins looking into Luthen, who she has named "Axis". Luthen sends Kleya to instruct Vel and her partner Cinta Kaz to find Cassian and kill him as he knows Luthen's identity. The two travel to Ferrix where they find Dedra has taken it over. Meanwhile, Luthen uses his contact in the ISB, supervisor Lonni Jung, to gain information on ISB activities. When asked by Lonni what he sacrifices, Luthen confesses that he knows he will never live to see the fruition of his plans and is being driven by "an equation he wrote 15 years ago" to defeat the Empire using their own tools. He believes he has sacrificed everything.

Luthen also visits Saw Gerrera, where he attempts to hire Gerrera's rebel cell to act as air support for a raid on an Imperial power station at Spellhaus organized by Anto Kreegyr, but is turned away. Later when Gerrera changes his mind, Luthen advices him against it after learning from Lonni that the ISB is aware of the attack. While returning to Coruscant, Luthen escapes from an Imperial patrol, destroying several TIE fighters and a tractor beam. After Cassian's adoptive mother Maarva dies, a funeral is announced to be held on Ferrix. Luthen, Vel, Cinta, and Dedra all believe Cassian will attend and they seek to either capture or kill him. Luthen travels to Ferrix where the funeral is being held. The funeral turns into an uprising after Maarva's final recorded words are played, rallying the populace to fight the Empire. Moved by the rebellion on Ferrix, Luthen returns to his ship where Cassian is waiting. Knowing of Luthen's intentions in Ferrix, Cassian offers a choice: Luthen can either kill him or take him in, to which Luthen smiles.

==== Season 2 ====
In 4 BBY, Luthen has assembled a wide array of spies and pilots. Cassian is sent to an Imperial base on Sienar to steal a TIE Avenger and hand it over to another of Luthen's spies, Porko, on Yavin 4. Luthen and Kleya travel to Chandrilla for the wedding of Leida, Mon's daughter, and Stekan Sculdun. Luthen arrives with Davo, Stekan's father, and works with him to provide a unique Chandi Merle artifact for the new couple. During the wedding, Luthen grows anxious from the lack of communications from Cassian or Porko, and sends Kleya back to Coruscant. Mon also approaches him and reveals banker Tay Kolma, who has been helping Mon embezzle the funds needed to fund the Rebellion, is having doubts and is blackmailing her for a cut of the money. The next day, Luthen sends Cinta to pose as Tay's driver and kill him.

One year later, Luthen moves Cassian and Bix into a safehouse on Coruscant. He asks Cassian to travel to Ghorman, a planet undergoing intense Imperial subjugation, after learning from Lonni that Dedra is running a program there. He also visits Bix, who has turned to self-medication to avoid nightmares of her Imperial torturer Dr. Gorst, warning her that her path was a deadly one. Cassian returns from Ghorman with the conclusion that the rebels on Ghorman are too inexperienced and unprepared, but Luthen tells Cassian to stop thinking like a soldier but rather a leader. He later sends Vel and Cinta to help complete the heist, which is successful at the cost of the latter's life. Cassian confronts Luthen after learning about his talk with Bix, to which Luthen reveals he is disappointed with Cassian for being soft on Ghorman and being overprotective of Bix. The next day, Luthen is informed by Kleya that Davo is examining all of his antiques after one was deemed fake. Luthen and Kleya attend a party at Davo's house in order to extract a listening device they had planted on an antique they gave him. There, Luthen meets Director Orson Krennic, who has a heated debate with Mon while Kleya extracts the device with Lonni's help. On the same night, Luthen sends Cassian and Bix to take revenge on Gorst by blowing up his office while he is tied up inside it.

In 2 BBY, Luthen sends Cassian to assassinate Dedra on Ghorman. However Dedra, who has been planning this insurgency under Krennic's authority, orders the genocide of the Ghorman people. Cassian escapes the planet while Dedra remains alive. He returns to Coruscant where Luthen instructs him to get Mon out of the senate building after her speech in which she plans to powerfully condemn Palpatine and the Empire's manipulation of the truth in regards to what happened on Ghorman. That night, Luthen butts heads with Mothma over the depth of his subterfuge within the Rebellion and his choice to have Tay killed. Luthen warns Mon to not escape with Bail Organa's team, as Lonni has informed him they are compromised, and instead trust Cassian. The plan succeeds as Mon manages to escape to Dantooine and makes a formal speech announcing the Alliance to Restore the Republic.

In the days leading up to the Battle of Yavin, Luthen learns from Lonni that the Empire's energy program, as well as the Ghorman and Jedha projects, is a front for a planet-destroying superweapon. Luthen kills Lonni and tells Kleya about the information while he goes back to the antiques store to destroy evidence. However, Dedra shows up at the store and reveals she has learned that Luthen is "Axis". Luthen tells Dedra that the Rebellion has already fled and that there is "an entire galaxy out there waiting to disgust [her]." Luthen tries to commit suicide by stabbing himself with one of his antiques knives, but Dedra and the ISB keep him on life support. Kleya later breaks into the hospital and tearfully disconnects Luthen's life support system, killing him.

=== Aftermath ===
Luthen telling the information to Kleya leads to her sending a distress signal to Yavin 4. Cassian, Ruescott Melshi, and droid K-2SO travel to Coruscant and rescue Kleya from Imperial forces. Kleya tells Cassian the information, which involves that the superweapon is linked to an engineer called Galen Erso. This leads into the events of Rogue One where Cassian finds Galen's daughter, Jyn Erso, and the two, along with a team, discover and steal the plans for the Death Star. Cassian and Jyn die during the Battle of Scarif, and later the plans end up leading to Luke Skywalker destroying the battle station in Star Wars (Note: Later retitled Star Wars: Episode IV – A New Hope) due to a flaw Galen designed in the Death Star. In the end, Luthen's covert efforts lay the foundation for the Rebellion and for the destruction of the Death Star, making him a pivotal figure in the Star Wars franchise.

== Reception ==
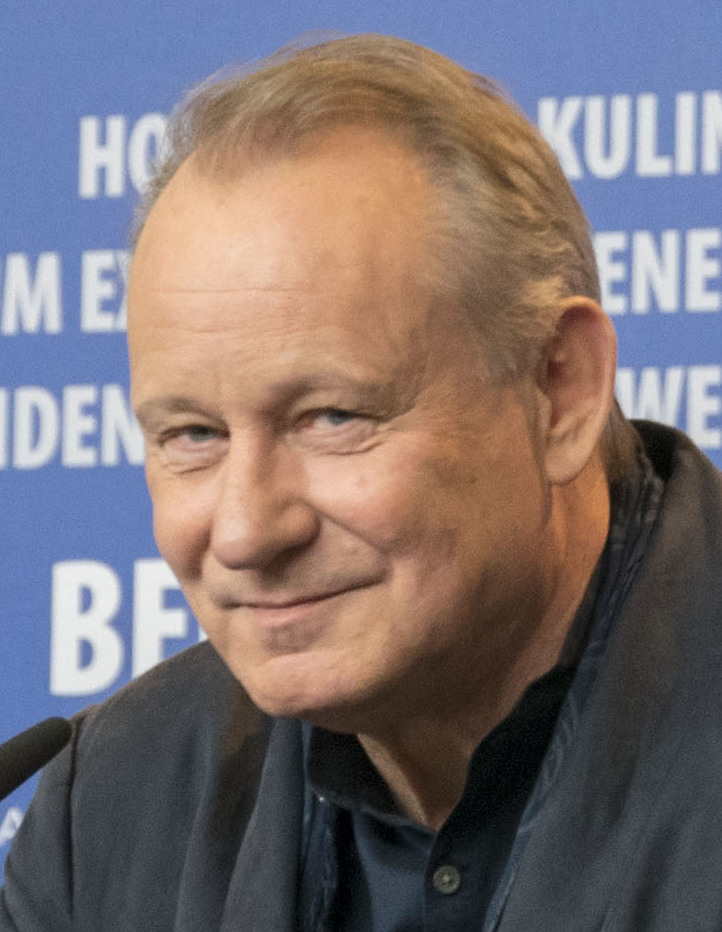
Stellan Skarsgård's portrayal of Luthen Rael has garnered critical acclaim.

Luthen Rael has been regarded as one of the best characters from the show. Lucas Kloberdanz-Dyck of Collider described him as "the underbelly of the Rebellion, the nasty side that they don't want people to see but is necessary for their success."

He has been praised for his complexity and nuance, with many praising actor Stellan Skarsgård for bringing gravitas to the role comparable to that of iconic franchise characters such as Luke Skywalker or Han Solo. Many claim Skarsgård as the best performance in the show, writing "[he encapsulates] everything Luthen represents and perfectly portraying subtle mannerisms." Luthen's monologue in the first-season episode "One Way Out" has been critically acclaimed, with Ben Lindberg of The Ringer cited Luthen's speech as "one of the most affecting sci-fi soliloquies since Rutger Hauer reminisced about tears in rain."
