= Orson Krennic =

Character in the Star Wars franchise

- Star Wars character
- Ben Mendelsohn as Orson Krennic in Rogue One (2016).
- First appearance: Catalyst (2016)
- Last appearance: "Jedha, Kyber, Erso"; Andor (2025)
- Created by: John Knoll
- Portrayed by: Ben Mendelsohn

In-universe information
- Full name: Orson Callan Krennic
- Gender: Male
- Titles: Lieutenant Commander, then Commander (formerly); Director
- Occupation: Republic Lieutenant Commander (later Commander); Imperial Director of Advanced Weapons Research
- Affiliation: Galactic Republic (formerly); Galactic Empire
- Home: Lexrul

Director Orson Callan Krennic is a fictional character in the Star Wars franchise, portrayed by Australian actor Ben Mendelsohn in the film Rogue One (2016) as the main antagonist, as well as in season 2 of the prequel series Andor (2025). Krennic is the Director of Advanced Weapons Research for the Galactic Empire.

== Character ==
=== Origins ===
Industrial Light & Magic chief creative officer John Knoll, credited for the story of the 2016 film Rogue One, told Vanity Fair in 2016 that he conceived the plot of the film while working as a visual effects supervisor on the 2005 film Star Wars: Episode III – Revenge of the Sith. Hearing about the development of a live-action Star Wars television series, he conceived a story, inspired by a plot point mentioned in the opening crawl of the original 1977 film Star Wars, which would eventually become Rogue One. In Knoll's original story draft of the film, Krennic was a double agent on Jyn Erso's team reporting to the Imperial Security Bureau. However, this was changed when Gary Whitta came aboard to write the script. Earlier planned endings for the film featured Krennic surviving the events on Scarif before being killed by Darth Vader for not preventing the Rebel Alliance's theft of the plans to the Death Star. The scene was cut as writers had trouble justifying how Krennic would have survived the explosion the Death Star caused.

=== Casting ===
In March 2015, it was announced that Ben Mendelsohn had been cast in a lead role in Rogue One. Mendelsohn said in an interview he learned about his casting while filming Bloodline, having dinner in a restaurant with director Gareth Edwards, "He [Edwards] told me about the story and he told me about the character and then he said, 'I want you to do it.'" Mendelsohn noted his response was immediate.

=== Description ===
The character of Orson Krennic is depicted as a power-hungry and ruthless Imperial weapons developer overseeing the construction of the Death Star, a space station with the capability to destroy an entire planet. Krennic has a rivalry with Grand Moff Tarkin, and seeks to win the favor of Emperor Palpatine.

James Luceno, author of the novel Catalyst: A Rogue One Novel which introduced Krennic, has said, "Orson Krennic prides himself in being able to get his way through manipulation and whatever devilish things he can come up with. He also has the ability to stay on his feet even when punches are being hurled at him. He can change strategies in the middle of things. This, combined with his innate volatility, makes him a very different kind of villain than we've seen".

In an interview with Collider, Mendelsohn spoke of his character, saying "He's an outsider, essentially. He's an outsider in so far as he's not a born officer class guy, he's a guy that worked his way up and regards a lot of the officer class as just not really worth their salt. And he is a guy that as it were has come up through stuff, so he has a great force of will, he also very much believes in the Empire's agenda, he's very onboard with it. He's risen his way up to become the head of military intelligence and operations and he's going to build this Death Star".

== Appearances ==
=== Catalyst ===
Krennic first appears in the 2016 prequel novel Catalyst: A Rogue One Novel by James Luceno. A Lieutenant Commander, later Commander, in the Galactic Republic Special Weapons group, he rescues his old friend Galen Erso, a scientist who has been kidnapped with his family by Separatist agents. Following the formation of the Empire, Krennic manipulates Galen to work on the Death Star project. The novel also explains how Krennic's interrogation of Poggle the Lesser, a character introduced in Attack of the Clones, kickstarted the Empire's Death Star Project.

=== Rogue One ===
Rogue One: A Star Wars Story was released in December 2016, featuring Ben Mendelsohn in the role of Orson Krennic. In the beginning of the film, he captures Galen Erso to force him to continue helping the Empire build the Death Star. Over a decade later, Krennic meets with Grand Moff Tarkin, who expresses skepticism about his management of the Death Star project. When the Death Star is completed, Krennic tests its superlaser on the capital city of Jedha upon Tarkin's request, killing Rebel extremist Saw Gerrera and his Partisans. Once Krennic has proven the station's power, the imperious Tarkin uses a recent security leak as a pretext to wrest control of the weapon away from him. A furious Krennic travels to Eadu to confront Galen and his team of engineers, whom he believes may be responsible for the leak. After Galen confesses, he is mortally wounded during a Rebel attack and Krennic flees. He later meets with Darth Vader on Mustafar, seeking an audience with Palpatine and to regain command of the Death Star, but is Force-choked and dismissed to ensure there are no further security breaches related to the Death Star project. Krennic goes to Scarif as the Rebels engage Imperial forces there, and sends his Death Trooper guards into battle while he attempts to stop the Rebels from stealing the Death Star plans hidden in the Scarif Imperial facility. Krennic shoots and wounds Cassian Andor, and later tries to kill Jyn Erso, but Andor recovers and shoots Krennic, incapacitating him. Krennic is subsequently killed by the superlaser of the Death Star when it fires on Scarif at Tarkin's order.

=== Star Wars: The Bad Batch ===
Mendelsohn reprises his role as Krennic in the Star Wars: The Bad Batch episode, "The Summit", set before the events of Rogue One, where he delivers a detail on the Death Star construction.

=== Andor ===
Mendelsohn reprises his role as Krennic in the second season of Andor (2025), taking place in the four years leading up to Rogue One. He recruits various Imperial officers to help with the mining of resources from the planet Ghorman for the Emperor's new energy program. The ISB officer Dedra Meero creates a plan to initiate a rebellion against the Empire on Ghorman, creating reason for Imperial subjugation. Secretly, the resources from Ghorman, along with kyber crystals from Jedha, were being used to power the Death Star. Meero is later revealed to be compromised as her knowledge is being leaked to rebellion leader Luthen Rael. Krennic orders a manhunt for Rael's assistant Kleya Marki, who escapes and shares information about the 'energy project' to the Rebellion.

=== Related works and merchandising ===
Krennic appears in the film novelization of Rogue One by Alexander Freed.

Krennic is a playable character in the 2015 action shooter video game Star Wars Battlefront, as part of the 2016 downloadable content (DLC) Rogue One: Scarif expansion pack. He also appears as a playable character in the mobile turn-based role-playing game Star Wars: Galaxy of Heroes, classified as an Empire support who inflicts various debuffs and works well with a Death Trooper. He is also a Dark Side squad leader in the 2017 MOBA Star Wars: Force Arena who provides a small energy boost and also possesses a rapid-fire attack ability.

Krennic is mentioned a few times in the final season of Star Wars Rebels, but did not appear in the series due to a creative decision by Dave Filoni. He was written into one of the earlier drafts of the episode "A Fool's Hope", but the scene was cut early on.

Star Wars: Darth Vader Annual #2 features an appearance by Krennic which depicts his first encounter with Vader and his feud with Tarkin.

Krennic appears in Timothy Zahn's 2019 novel Star Wars: Thrawn: Treason. Set against the backdrop of the last episodes of Star Wars Rebels, the novel includes an encounter between Krennic and Grand Admiral Thrawn.

== Reception ==
Krennic has generally been received positively by critics and fans. Gareth Edwards told USA Today that he liked how the character was "much more working-class" and rose to the ranks "through sheer force of personality and ideas". In Sight & Sound's otherwise critical review of the film, Tim Hayes wrote, "Apart from Ben Mendelsohn's weaselly Orson Krennic ... and perhaps Donnie Yen as a blind samurai ... the faces are unmemorable and the characters unexceptional". Meredith Woerner of Los Angeles Times called the white cape which Krennic wears the "standout piece" of the film, writing that it "unfolds a world of menace by simply gliding over a bloody beach or whipping through the rain without ever showing even the tiniest speck of dirt".

Conversely, Joshua Starnes wrote that Krennic's failures against the Rebels and pursuit of praise do not make him "a particularly sinister or effective villain", and the film "continually weakens him as a threatening presence".
