= That Would Be Me =

- Andor episode
- Episode no.: Season 1 Episode 2
- Directed by: Toby Haynes
- Written by: Tony Gilroy
- Cinematography by: Adriano Goldman
- Editing by: John Gilroy; Tim Porter
- Original release date: September 21, 2022
- Running time: 38 minutes

Cast
- Antonio Viña as Kassa; Neil Bell as Time Grappler; Abhin Galeya as Salman Paak; Muhannad Bhaier as Wilmon; Kieran O'Brien as Pegla; Joplin Sibtain as Brasso; Raymond Anum as Nurchi; James McArdle as Timm Karlo; Margaret Clunie as Hostess; Alex Ferns as Sergeant Linus Mosk; Zubin Varla as Xanwan; Ron Cook as Willi; Abraham Popoola as North-1

Episode chronology
← Previous "Kassa"	Next → "Reckoning"

"That Would Be Me" is the second episode of the first season of the American streaming television series Andor, based on Star Wars created by George Lucas. It was written by Tony Gilroy and directed by Toby Haynes.

The episode stars Diego Luna as Cassian Andor, who reprises his role from the Star Wars spinoff film, Rogue One (2016). Haynes was hired in September 2020 after a production delay due the COVID-19 pandemic, and Gilroy joined the series as showrunner in early 2019, replacing Stephen Schiff. Both executive produce alongside Luna and Kathleen Kennedy.

"That Would Be Me" was released on Disney+ on September 21, 2022, along with "Kassa" and "Reckoning", as a three-part series premiere.

== Plot ==
Timm Karlo, suspicious of Cassian Andor, reports him after seeing an alert for a Kenari male. Andor visits Maarva, where she has discovered that he was on Morlana One and is furious he has told people of his history on Kenari. He visits Bix Caleen to sell technology through her connections on the black market and she reveals the buyer is arriving the following day. The next morning, Andor informs B2EMO of his intentions to leave. He then attempts to buy his way off Ferrix, but needs the money from Bix's dealer.

That dealer, Luthen Rael, heads to Ferrix and observes the scrapyard through binoculars. He then discusses his life before the Empire with a passenger on a hoverbus. After investigating Timm's tip, Syril Karn partners with Sergeant Linus Mosk, an equally dutiful Pre-Mor officer, to arrest Andor. Karn and Mosk travel to Ferrix, where Mosk professionally debriefs their troops on the plan to ambush Andor, but Karn stumbles in his attempts to inspire them.

In a series of flashbacks, young Kassa and the Kenari tribe venture through the jungle to a crashed Republic mining ship. The leader, a teenaged girl, inspects the bodies of seemingly deceased crew members but is killed by one of them, who in turn is killed with poisoned darts by the tribe. The tribe take the leader's body back to camp, whilst Kassa stays behind to explore.

== Production ==
=== Development ===
Disney CEO Bob Iger announced in February 2018 that there were several Star Wars series in development, and that November one was revealed as a prequel to the film Rogue One (2016). The series was described as a spy thriller show focused on the character Cassian Andor, with Diego Luna reprising his role from the film. Jared Bush originally developed the series, writing a pilot script and series bible for the project. By the end of November, Stephen Schiff was serving as showrunner and executive producer of the series. Tony Gilroy, who was credited as a co-writer on Rogue One and oversaw extensive reshoots for the film, joined the series by early 2019 when he discussed the first story details with Luna. Gilroy's involvement was revealed that October, when he was set to write the first episode, direct multiple episodes, and work alongside Schiff; Gilroy had officially replaced Schiff as showrunner by April 2020. Six weeks of pre-production for the series had taken place in the United Kingdom by then, but this was halted and production on the series delayed due to the COVID-19 pandemic. Pre-production had begun again by September ahead of a planned filming start the next month. At that time, Gilroy, who is based in New York, chose not to travel to the UK for production on the series due to the pandemic, and was therefore unable to direct the series' first episode. Instead, the UK-based Toby Haynes, who was already "high on the list" of potential directors for the series, was hired to direct the first three episodes. Gilroy would remain executive producer and showrunner. In December 2020, Luna was revealed to be executive producing the series.

The second episode, titled "That Would Be Me", was written by Tony Gilroy.

=== Writing ===
The writing was structured so that a story arc is contained in every three episodes. For the first three episodes, Gilroy had wanted to address Andor's accent while also exploring his backstory further. He had originally created Andor's origin story while writing the series, and opted to include it earlier in the series to avoid having to "carry it through the whole show". Further describing it as a "contained piece", he had also commented "at some point, I [Gilroy] must have come up with the cutting pattern, and then the interesting thing became how to really tell the young Cassian story, how to stretch that out, and how to get the most out of it".

Flashbacks in the episode revealed that Andor's birth name is Kassa and one of the main reasons to include the flashbacks was to explain Andor's accent.

=== Casting ===
The episode stars Diego Luna as Cassian Andor, Kyle Soller as Syril Karn, Adria Arjona as Bix Caleen, Joplin Sibtain as Brasso, James McArdle as Timm Karlo, and Rupert Vansittart as Chief Hyne.

=== Filming ===
Filming began in London, England, at the end of November 2020, with the production based at Pinewood Studios. The series was filmed under the working title Pilgrim, and was the first live-action Star Wars series to not make use of the StageCraft digital background technology. Filming locations included Black Park in Buckinghamshire, England for the flashback scenes, as well as at Middle Peak Quarry in Derbyshire, England.

=== Music ===
Nicholas Britell composed the musical score for the episode. The episode's soundtrack was released in October 2022 as part of the first volume for the series. The volume also consisted of the soundtracks for episodes 3–4.

Andor: Episode 2 (Original Soundtrack)
No.	Title	Length
1.	"Andor (Main Title Theme) – Episode 2"	0:52
2.	"End of Day"	1:21
3.	"Who Else Knows?"	1:47
4.	"Luthen Rael"	1:25
5.	"The Kenari War Cry"	1:32
6.	"The Night Before"	1:58
7.	"Pilgrim"	1:29
Total length:		10:40

== Release ==
"That Would Be Me" was released on Disney+ on September 21, 2022. It was originally set to premiere on August 31. In November 2022, Disney announced that the first two episodes would air on ABC on November 23, on FX on November 24, and Freeform on November 25, and be available on Hulu from November 23 through December 7. A similar move was also replicated across various countries in Europe, including Portugal, Spain, Poland and the Netherlands, with the first two episodes airing on Fox, on November 24 or 25, depending on the country.

The episode, along with the rest of the first season of Andor was released on Ultra HD Blu-ray and Blu-ray by Walt Disney Studios Home Entertainment on April 30, 2024.

== Reception ==
=== Audience viewership ===
The first three episodes released at the same time and according to Nielsen Media Research who measure the number of minutes watched by United States audiences on television sets, Andor was the sixth-most watched original series across streaming services for the week of September 19–25, 2022, with 624 million minutes watched.

=== Critical response ===
The review aggregator website Rotten Tomatoes reports a 90% approval rating with an average rating of 7.70/10, based on 110 reviews. The site's critical consensus reads, "This installment suffers from being the middle chapter of a three-parter that needs to be watched concurrently to yield any payoff, but Andor's galactic scale and keen writing shine on."
