= Reckoning (Andor) =

- Andor episode
- Episode no.: Season 1 Episode 3
- Directed by: Toby Haynes
- Written by: Tony Gilroy
- Cinematography by: Adriano Goldman
- Editing by: John Gilroy; Tim Porter
- Original release date: September 21, 2022
- Running time: 38 minutes

Cast
- Antonio Viña as Kassa; Joplin Sibtain as Brasso; Victor Perez as Rashi; Ron Cook as Willi; Alex Ferns as Sergeant Linus Mosk; Gary Beadle as Clem Andor; James McArdle as Timm Karlo; Muhannad Bhaier as Wilmon; Abhin Galeya as Salman Paak; Zubin Varla as Xanwan; Abraham Popoola as North-1

Episode chronology
← Previous "That Would Be Me"	Next → "Aldhani"

"Reckoning" is the third episode of the first season of the American streaming television series Andor, based on Star Wars created by George Lucas. It was written by Tony Gilroy and directed by Toby Haynes.

The episode stars Diego Luna as Cassian Andor, who reprises his role from the Star Wars spinoff film, Rogue One (2016). Haynes was hired in September 2020 after a production delay due the COVID-19 pandemic, and Gilroy joined the series as showrunner in early 2019, replacing Stephen Schiff. Both executive produce alongside Luna and Kathleen Kennedy.

"Reckoning" was released on Disney+ on September 21, 2022, along with "Kassa" and "That Would Be Me", as a three-part series premiere.

== Plot ==
In a series of flashbacks, young Kassa climbs into the wrecked mining ship and explores its technology. Maarva and her husband Clem arrive to salvage the ship for parts, and encounter Kassa, who is destroying equipment inside the ship in anger. Maarva decides to knock him unconscious and take him with them to save him from incoming Republic ships.

In BBY 5, Luthen Rael meets with Bix Caleen on Ferrix and discusses Cassian Andor. Rael leaves to meet with Andor. Meanwhile, Pre-Mor officers Karn and Mosk arrive on Ferrix and restrain Maarva. They discover Andor's location through B2EMO and prepare to surround the warehouse. Rael and Andor bargain for Andor's Starpath unit, but Rael is more interested in Andor's skill as a spy and successful infiltrations of Empire bases.

Brasso and other Ferrix residents attempt to intimidate the Pre-Mor officers by banging on metal objects. However, the officers manage to apprehend Bix, killing Timm Karlo when he attempts to approach her. Rael convinces Andor to leave with him, and they eventually manage to escape on a speeder. While Kassa meets his adoptive parents in the cockpit in the past, Andor leaves with Rael on his starship in the present.

== Production ==
=== Development ===
Disney CEO Bob Iger announced in February 2018 that there were several Star Wars series in development, and that November one was revealed as a prequel to the film Rogue One (2016). The series was described as a spy thriller show focused on the character Cassian Andor, with Diego Luna reprising his role from the film. Jared Bush originally developed the series, writing a pilot script and series bible for the project. By the end of November, Stephen Schiff was serving as showrunner and executive producer of the series. Tony Gilroy, who was credited as a co-writer on Rogue One and oversaw extensive reshoots for the film, joined the series by early 2019 when he discussed the first story details with Luna. Gilroy's involvement was revealed that October, when he was set to write the first episode, direct multiple episodes, and work alongside Schiff; Gilroy had officially replaced Schiff as showrunner by April 2020. Six weeks of pre-production for the series had taken place in the United Kingdom by then, but this was halted and production on the series delayed due to the COVID-19 pandemic. Pre-production had begun again by September ahead of a planned filming start the next month. At that time, Gilroy, who is based in New York, chose not to travel to the UK for production on the series due to the pandemic, and was therefore unable to direct the series' first episode. Instead, the UK-based Toby Haynes, who was already "high on the list" of potential directors for the series, was hired to direct the first three episodes. Gilroy would remain executive producer and showrunner. In December 2020, Luna was revealed to be executive producing the series.

The third episode, titled "Reckoning", was written by Tony Gilroy.

=== Writing ===
The writing was structured so that a story arc is contained in every three episodes. For the first three episodes, Gilroy had wanted to address Andor's accent while also exploring his backstory further. He had originally created Andor's origin story while writing the series, and opted to include it earlier in the series to avoid having to "carry it through the whole show". Further describing it as a "contained piece", he had also commented "at some point, I [Gilroy] must have come up with the cutting pattern, and then the interesting thing became how to really tell the young Cassian story, how to stretch that out, and how to get the most out of it". The episode depicts Maarva and her husband, Clem, scavenging for parts of a crashed spaceship on Kenari, and later finding and subsequently adopting Andor. Actress Fiona Shaw had felt Maarva's situation was similar to Detroit in the 1970s, where "people were recycling bits of cars". Shaw felt that her adoption of Andor had "saved her", as it has given her somebody to love. When Maarva says "That's what a reckoning sounds like" in response to Imperial officials raiding her home to search for Andor, Shaw opined that Maarva had previously experienced oppression under the Empire's regime, saying "I enjoyed that because what was also written in it is this feeling that Maarva has been in these moments before, the same way somebody might remember the 1960s and when the revolution died".

=== Casting ===
The episode stars Diego Luna as Cassian Andor, Kyle Soller as Syril Karn, Adria Arjona as Bix Caleen, Joplin Sibtain as Brasso, James McArdle as Timm Karlo, and Rupert Vansittart as Chief Hyne.

=== Filming ===
Filming began in London, England, at the end of November 2020, with the production based at Pinewood Studios. The series was filmed under the working title Pilgrim, and was the first live-action Star Wars series to not make use of the StageCraft digital background technology. Filming locations included Black Park in Buckinghamshire, England for the flashback scenes, as well as at Middle Peak Quarry in Derbyshire, England.

=== Music ===
Nicholas Britell composed the musical score for the episode. The episode's soundtrack was released in October 2022 as part of the first volume for the series. The volume also consisted of the soundtrack for episode 4.

Andor: Episode 3 (Original Soundtrack)
No.	Title	Length
1.	"Andor (Main Title Theme) – Episode 3"	0:40
2.	"Mirror"	2:08
3.	"Corpos"	1:41
4.	"In Their House/Who Are You?"	2:07
5.	"The Reckoning"	0:56
6.	"Past/Present Suite"	3:44
Total length:		11:26

== Release ==
"Reckoning" was released on Disney+ on September 21, 2022.

The episode, along with the rest of the first season of Andor was released on Ultra HD Blu-ray and Blu-ray by Walt Disney Studios Home Entertainment on April 30, 2024.

== Reception ==
=== Audience viewership ===
The first three episodes released at the same time and according to Nielsen Media Research who measure the number of minutes watched by United States audiences on television sets, Andor was the sixth-most watched original series across streaming services for the week of September 19–25, 2022, with 624 million minutes watched.

=== Critical response ===
The review aggregator website Rotten Tomatoes reports a 93% approval rating with an average rating of 7.70/10, based on 108 reviews. The site's critical consensus reads, "Bringing its inciting arc to a satisfying close, Andor starts taking shape as Diego Luna's rebel without a cause discovers a grander purpose."

=== Accolades ===
At the Golden Reel Awards 2022, the episode was nominated for Outstanding Achievement in Sound Editing – Broadcast Long Form Effects and Foley. At the 21st Visual Effects Society Awards, the episode was nominated for Outstanding Created Environment in an Episode, Commercial, or Real-Time Project.
