= Andor =

2022–2025 Star Wars television series

- Also known as: Star Wars: Andor; Andor: A Star Wars Story
- Genre: Action-adventure; Drama; Dystopia; Political thriller; Spy thriller; Science fiction
- Created by: Tony Gilroy
- Based on: Star Wars by George Lucas
- Showrunner: Tony Gilroy
- Starring: Diego Luna; Kyle Soller; Adria Arjona; Stellan Skarsgård; Fiona Shaw; Genevieve O'Reilly; Denise Gough; Faye Marsay; Varada Sethu; Elizabeth Dulau; Ben Mendelsohn; Benjamin Bratt; Alan Tudyk
- Composers: Nicholas Britell; Brandon Roberts (season 2)
- Country of origin: United States
- Original language: English
- No. of seasons: 2
- No. of episodes: 24

Production
- Executive producers: Sanne Wohlenberg; Tony Gilroy; Kathleen Kennedy; Diego Luna; Toby Haynes; Michelle Rejwan; John Gilroy; Luke Hull
- Producers: Kate Hazell; David Meanti
- Production location: United Kingdom
- Cinematography: Adriano Goldman; Frank Lamm; Damián García; Christophe Nuyens; Mark Patten
- Editors: John Gilroy; Tim Porter; Hazel Baillie; Dan Roberts; Frances Parker; Matthew Cannings; Simon Smith; Yan Miles; Craig Ferreira; Morten Højbjerg
- Running time: 38–60 minutes
- Production company: Lucasfilm
- Budget: $650 million

Original release
- Network: Disney+
- Release: September 21, 2022 – May 13, 2025

Related
- Rogue One

Andor, also known as Star Wars: Andor or Andor: A Star Wars Story, is an American television series created by Tony Gilroy for the streaming service Disney+. It is part of the Star Wars franchise and a prequel to the anthology film Rogue One: A Star Wars Story (2016), itself a prequel to the original 1977 Star Wars film. The series follows an ensemble cast primarily centered upon thief-turned-rebel spy Cassian Andor during the five formative years leading up to the events of the two films, exploring Andor's radicalization against the Galactic Empire as well as the formation of the wider Rebel Alliance.

Diego Luna reprises his role as Cassian Andor from Rogue One and serves as an executive producer. The series also stars Kyle Soller, Adria Arjona, Stellan Skarsgård, Fiona Shaw, Genevieve O'Reilly, Denise Gough, Faye Marsay, Varada Sethu, Elizabeth Dulau, and Benjamin Bratt, with Ben Mendelsohn and Alan Tudyk reprising their roles from Rogue One. Lucasfilm announced the series in 2018, with Luna attached and Stephen Schiff as showrunner. Schiff was replaced by Rogue One co-writer Gilroy as creator and showrunner in April 2020. Filming took place at Pinewood Studios in London and on location around the UK, with Neal Scanlan returning from Rogue One to provide practical effects. The first season, covering the year of Andor's life during which he becomes a revolutionary, was filmed from November 2020 to September 2021 during the COVID-19 pandemic. The second season covers the next four years and ends where the events of Rogue One begin; it was filmed from November 2022 to February 2024, delayed due to the 2023 Hollywood labor disputes. Nicholas Britell composed the first season's soundtrack, with Brandon Roberts replacing Britell for the majority of the second season due to scheduling conflicts.

Andor premiered on September 21, 2022, with the first three episodes of the first season. Disney released the other nine episodes weekly through November 23. The second and final season premiered on April 22, 2025, with three episodes released per week through May 13. The series received widespread critical acclaim for its writing, performances, characterization, cinematography, production values, themes, and its darker, more mature, and grounded tone as compared to other Star Wars properties. Many publications have called it one of the best Star Wars productions of all time. Andor received twenty-two nominations for Primetime Emmy Awards and won five in 2025 for its second season, including Outstanding Writing for a Drama Series for the second season's ninth episode, and won the 2022 and 2025 Peabody Award for creating a world "that stresses the need for grassroots organizing lest a fascistic state wholly subsume any spark of rebellion."

== Premise ==
Andor explores the society of the authoritarian Galactic Empire, the workings of the Empire's government and bureaucracy, and the realities of life under an autocratic regime. The series begins five years before the events of Rogue One and A New Hope, employing an ensemble cast to demonstrate how a Rebel Alliance forms in opposition to the Empire. Central to the cast is the eponymous Cassian Andor, a thief who becomes a revolutionary and eventually joins the Rebellion.

== Cast and characters ==
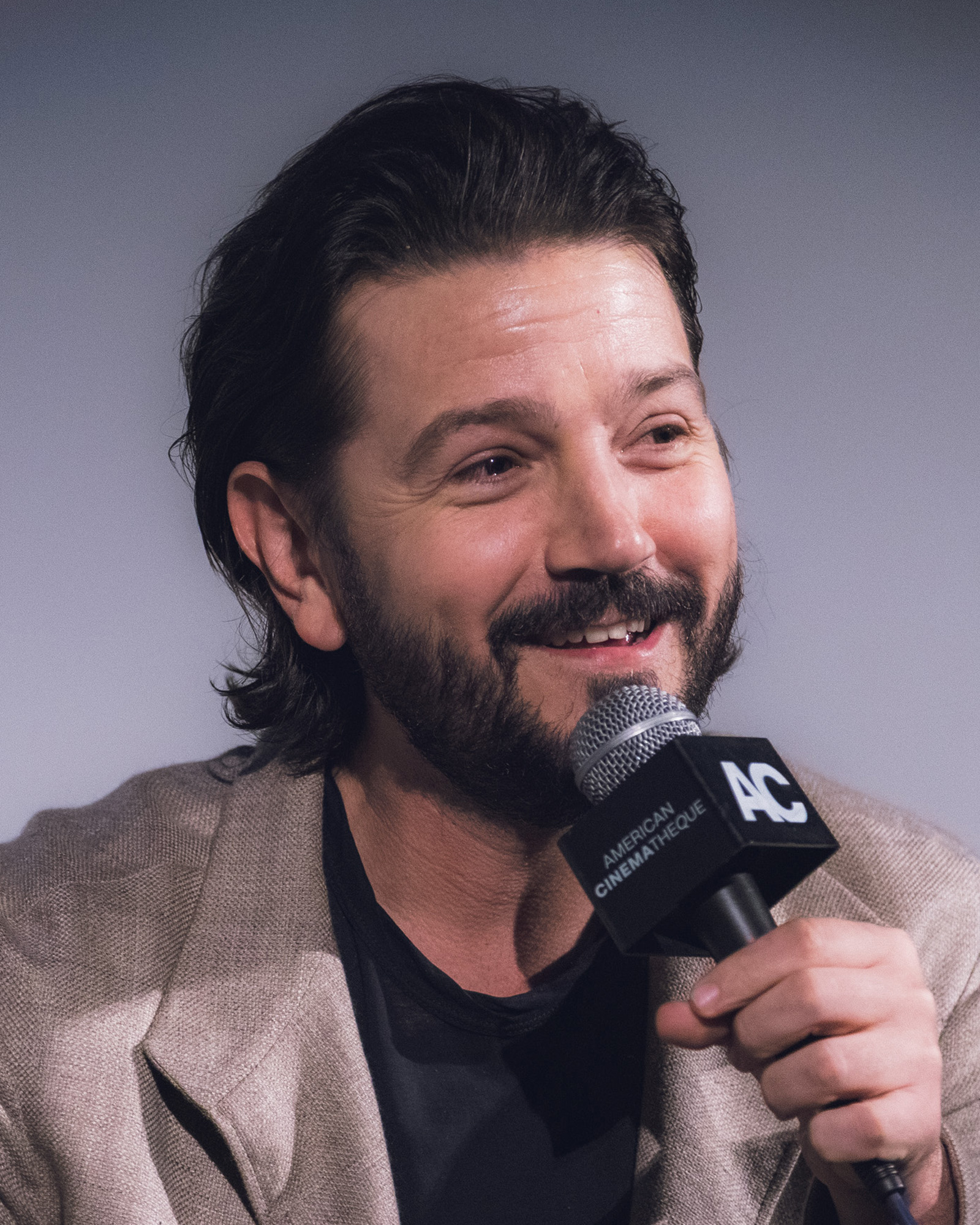
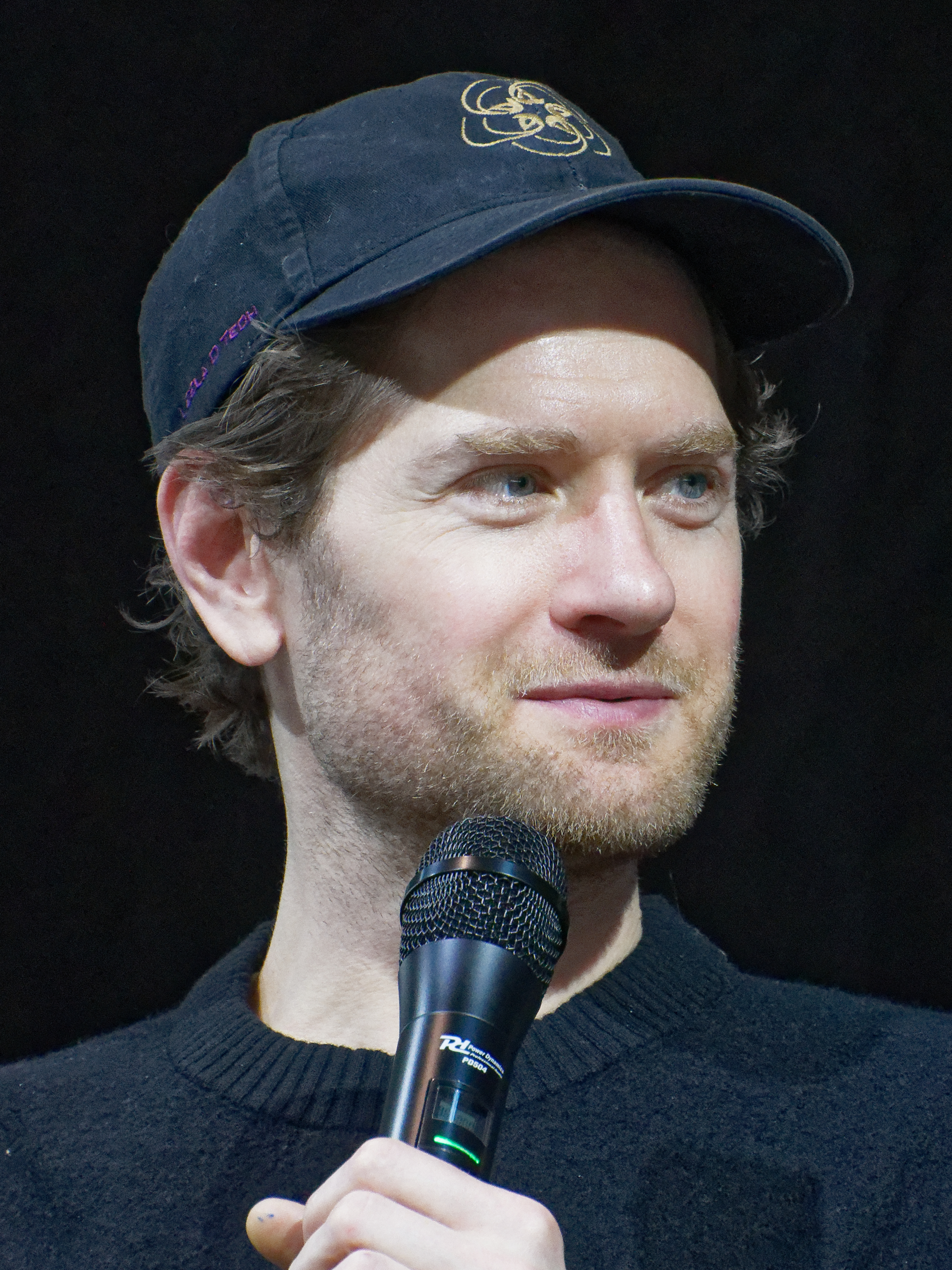
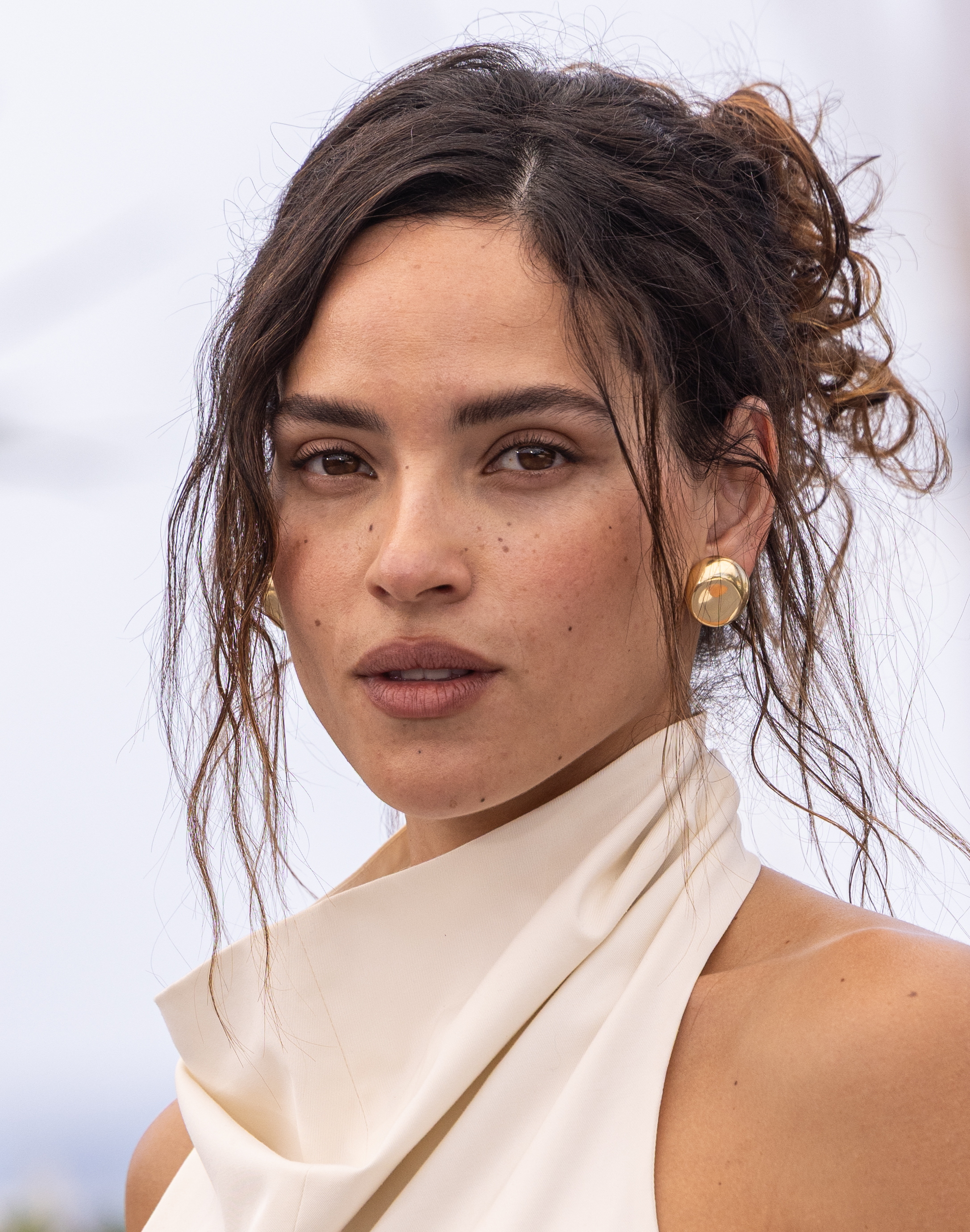
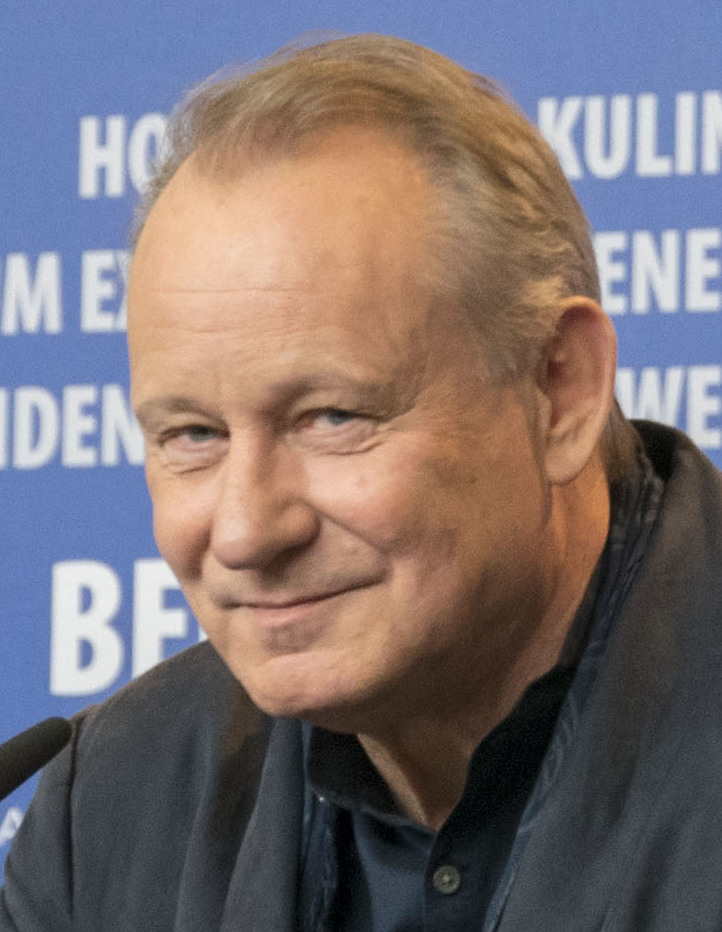
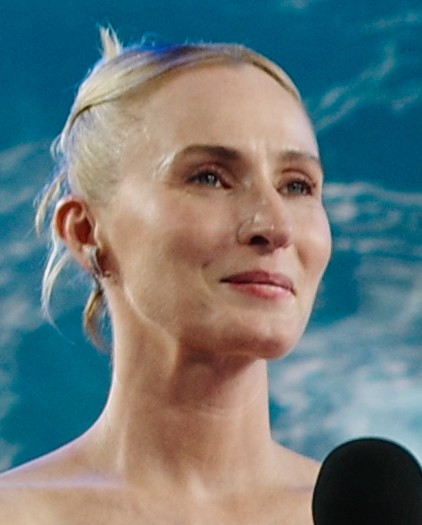
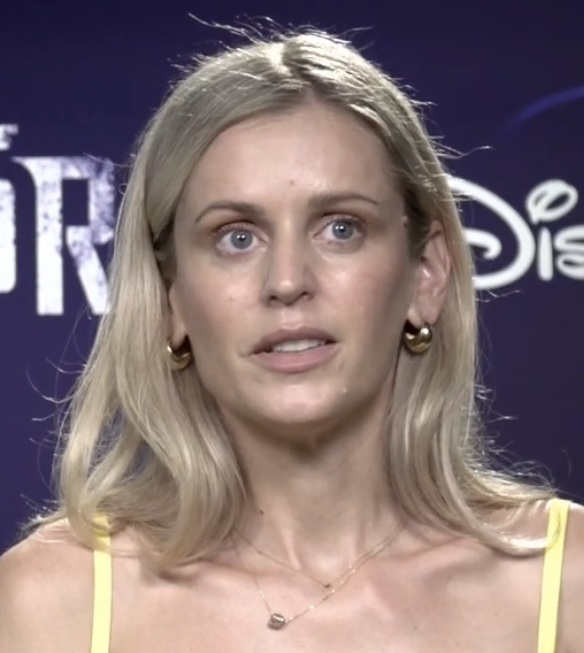
Diego Luna, Kyle Soller, Adria Arjona (top), Stellan Skarsgård, Genevieve O'Reilly, and Denise Gough (bottom) star in Andor.

=== Starring ===
- Diego Luna as Cassian Andor: A thief and scavenger whose home planet, Kenari, was rendered uninhabitable by the Galactic Empire. The series begins with Andor as a "revolution-averse" cynic and explores how he becomes "the most passionate person who's going to give themselves to save the galaxy" in Rogue One. Gilroy has described him as a natural leader who manipulates people, adding that he is "really a perfect kind of spy, warrior, killer." Antonio Viña portrays a young Cassian, when he was known as Kassa.
- Kyle Soller as Syril Karn: A Deputy Inspector for Preox-Morlana (Pre-Mor) Authority, a corporate conglomerate in charge of a trade sector. Syril works for Pre-Mor's security services and is determined to capture Cassian after learning he killed two Pre-Mor security employees.
- Adria Arjona as Bix Caleen: A mechanic and black market dealer who is Cassian's ally and close friend, and has been romantically involved with him on and off. She cares for Maarva in Cassian's absence.
- Stellan Skarsgård as Luthen Rael: A key player in the nascent rebellion, known only as "Axis" by Imperial agents. He is Bix's contact for selling stolen equipment, and hires Cassian on his first mission as a Rebel operative. Luthen poses publicly as an antiques dealer from Coruscant.
- Fiona Shaw as Maarva Andor (season 1): Cassian's adoptive mother who took him from Kenari with her husband, Clem.
- Genevieve O'Reilly as Mon Mothma: An Imperial senator representing the wealthy core world of Chandrila who tries to navigate the politics of the Empire while secretly using her family fortune to help fund the fledgling rebellion. O'Reilly reprises the role from prior Star Wars media, including Rogue One.
- Denise Gough as Dedra Meero: An ambitious and strategic supervisor for the Imperial Security Bureau (ISB) who is deeply absorbed with hunting and eliminating a rebel leader code-named "Axis". She is later seen in a relationship with Syril.
- Faye Marsay as Vel Sartha: A Rebel operative working for Luthen who leads the raiding mission on Aldhani, and Mothma's cousin. She is in a relationship with Cinta.
- Varada Sethu as Cinta Kaz: A Rebel on Aldhani who has lost her family to Imperial occupation. She is a medic and in a relationship with Vel.
- Elizabeth Dulau as Kleya Marki: Luthen's assistant at his antiques store, who plays a critical part in his Rebel circle as a covert communications officer.
- Ben Mendelsohn as Orson Krennic (season 2): The director of advanced weapons research for the Imperial military. Mendelsohn reprises his role from Rogue One.
- Benjamin Bratt as Bail Organa (season 2): An Imperial senator representing the world of Alderaan and adoptive father to Leia Organa. Bratt replaced Jimmy Smits (who portrayed the character in previous Star Wars media) due to scheduling conflicts.
- Alan Tudyk as the voice and motion-capture of K-2SO (season 2): A former Imperial enforcer droid who is reprogrammed to serve the Rebellion. Tudyk reprises his role from Rogue One.

=== Recurring ===
- Joplin Sibtain as Brasso: Cassian's co-worker and friend.
- James McArdle as Timm Karlo (season 1): Bix's co-worker and boyfriend.
- Rupert Vansittart as Chief Hyne (season 1): Syril's Pre-Mor superior.
- Alex Ferns as Sergeant Linus Mosk (season 1): A Pre-Mor officer.
- Gary Beadle as Clem Andor (season 1): Maarva's partner and Cassian's adoptive father. Cassian uses his name as an alias.
- Kathryn Hunter as Eedy Karn: Syril's mother.
- Alastair Mackenzie as Perrin Fertha: Mothma's husband, who is unaware of her anti-Imperial activities.
- Bronte Carmichael as Leida Mothma: Mothma's daughter.
- Anton Lesser as Major Lio Partagaz: Dedra's commanding officer in the Imperial Security Bureau.
- Alex Lawther as Karis Nemik: An idealistic Rebel on Aldhani who has written an anti-Empire manifesto.
- Sule Rimi as Lieutenant Gorn (season 1): An Imperial officer on Aldhani who is secretly one of Vel's Rebels.
- Ebon Moss-Bachrach as Arvel Skeen (season 1): A mysterious Rebel on Aldhani.
- Gershwyn Eustache Jnr as Taramyn Barcona (season 1): A Rebel on Aldhani who is a former Stormtrooper.
- Stanley Townsend as Commandant Jayhold Beehaz (season 1): Gorn's Imperial superior on Aldhani.
- Ben Miles as Tay Kolma: A banker and Mothma's childhood friend from whom she seeks help.
- Andy Serkis as Kino Loy (season 1): A prisoner and floor manager at the Imperial factory facility on the moon Narkina 5. Serkis previously portrayed Supreme Leader Snoke in the sequel trilogy.
- Duncan Pow as Ruescott Melshi: A labor worker and inmate at the Imperial factory facility on Narkina 5 who later joins the Rebel Alliance alongside Andor. Pow reprises his role from Rogue One.
- Forest Whitaker as Saw Gerrera: A veteran of the Clone Wars and the leader of a militant insurgent group, the Partisans. Whitaker reprises his role from previous Star Wars media, including Rogue One.
- Richard Dillane as Davo Sculdun: A shady businessman whom Mon Mothma enlists to unwittingly help her embezzle funds for the Rebellion, in exchange for a betrothal between his son Stekan and her daughter Leida.
- Muhannad Bhaier as Wilmon Paak (season 2; guest season 1): A young Ferrix resident, who worked alongside his father Salman at the Repaak Salyard and eventually joins the emerging rebellion following Salman's death at the hands of the Empire.
- Pierro Niel-Mee as Erskin Semaj (season 2): Mon Mothma's aide in the Galactic Senate and in her rebellious affairs. The character first appeared in the animated series Star Wars Rebels, voiced by Josh Brener.
- Sam Gilroy as Gerdis (season 2): A member of the Maya Pei Brigade, a rebel cell on Yavin IV.
- Benjamin Norris as Bardi (season 2): A member of the Maya Pei Brigade.
- Robert Emms as Lonni Jung (season 2; guest season 1): An ISB supervisor who is secretly a rebel informant who reports to Luthen.
- Jacob James Beswick as Avril Heert (season 2; guest season 1): An assistant to ISB Supervisor Dedra Meero. He is later promoted to ISB Supervisor himself and assigned by Major Partagaz to take over the investigation into "Axis".
- Richard Sammel as Carro Rylanz (season 2): A Ghorman elected official and leader of an emerging rebel group known as the Ghorman Front.
- Thierry Godard as Lezine (season 2): A male human and outspoken critic of the Galactic Empire's occupation of the planet Ghorman.
- Alistair Petrie as General Davits Draven (season 2): A rebel leader on Yavin IV. Petrie reprises his role from Rogue One.
- Jonjo O'Neill as Captain Kaido (season 2): An Imperial Army officer and crisis specialist, deployed to Ghorman to oversee the tactics of instigating rebel dissent to warrant an Imperial response.

Dave Chapman voices Maarva Andor's droid B2EMO. Chapman was assisted in B2EMO's performance by Matthew Denton and Lee Towersey. Aidan Cook reprises his Rogue One role as Two Tubes, a loyal soldier in Saw Gerrera's partisan fighters.

Ben Bailey Smith, Michael Jenn and Lucy Russell portray Imperial Security supervisors Blevin, Lagret and Grandi, respectively. Other Imperials include Lee Ross as Exmar Kloris, Mon Mothma's driver and a spy for ISB; Wilf Scolding as Vanis Tigo, captain of Imperial garrison on Ferrix; Nick Moss as Keysax, Tigo's lieutenant; Noof Ousellam as Corv, Imperial spy on Ferrix; Joshua James as Dr. Gorst, an ISB scientist who specializes in torture; and Kurt Egyiawan as Grymish, Dedra's attendant on Ghorman.

Other residents of Ferrix include Abhin Galeya as Salman Paak, Wilmon's father and a salvage shop owner who runs the Repaak Salyard; Kieran O'Brien as Pegla, a sentry for Zorby's Western Shiplot, the starship lot; Raymond Anum as Nurchi, a junk dealer; Victor Perez as Rashi, a grappler; Zubin Varla as Xanwan, the head of the transport business; Neil Bell as the "Time Grappler" who signals the time in the bell tower by banging his anvil; and Pamela Nomvete as Jezzi, a member of the Daughters of Ferrix.

Christopher Fairbank, Clemens Schick, Brian Bovell, Tom Reed, Josef Davies, Rasaq Kukoyi and Mensah Bediako appear as Ulaf, Ham, Jemboc, Taga, Xaul, Birnok and Zinska, respectively, all of whom are prison inmates on Narkina 5. Rosalind Halstead and Finley Glasgow appears as Davo Sculdun's wife Runai and son Stekan. Claire Brown and Laura Marcus appear as Mina-Rau residents Talia and Beela, respectively.

Alaïs Lawson appears as Enza Rylanz, a member of her father's rebel group known as the Ghorman Front. Théo Costa-Marini, Abraham Wapler, Ella Pellegrini, Caroline Vanier, Ewens Abid, Alex Skarbek and Stefan Crepon appear as Thela, Samm, Dreena, Leeza, Tazi, Capso and Thela, respectively, other rebels of Ghorman Front. Raphael Roger Levy appears as Dasi Oran, a senator that represented the planet Ghorman on the Imperial Senate.

Malcolm Sinclair appears as Colonel Wullf Yularen, a character from various Star Wars media, who was previously portrayed by Robert Clarke in A New Hope and voiced by Tom Kane in Star Wars: The Clone Wars and Star Wars Rebels. In the final episode, Jonathan Aris, Sharon Duncan-Brewster and Eric MacLennan reprise their Rogue One roles as Senator Nower Jebel, Senator Tynnra Pamlo, and Private Tenzigo Weems respectively. Stephen Stanton reprises his voice of Admiral Raddus from Rogue One, while performed by James Henri-Thomas where the character was previously performed by Paul Kasey in Rogue One.

Additional guest stars include Belle Swarc as Andor's sister Kerri; Lee Boardman and Stephen Wight as Kravas and Verlo, the Pre-Mor officers who are killed by Andor. David Hayman appears as the Chieftain of the Aldhani natives; and Nick Blood as Kimzi, a corporal in Aldhani. Adrian Rawlins appears as Rhasiv, a prison medic on Narkina 5. Alex Waldmann appears as Lieutenant Krole, a low-level Imperial officer carrying out crop audits on Mina-Rau. Marc Rissmann appears as Plutti, a member of Saw Gerrera's Partisans and Imperial spy. Josie Walker appears as a Force healer on Yavin IV. Dominic Weatherill appears as a Mudtrooper deployed on Ferrix.

Sam Witwer provides the uncredited voice of the shoretrooper who arrests Andor on Niamos. (Note: As depicted in "Announcement".) The Keredian brothers Dewi and Freedi Pamular are performed by Matt Lyons and Liam Cook, and voiced by Mike Quinn and Damian Farrell respectively. The narration for the "Welcome to Ghorman" video was provided by Wally Wingert. The alien Strang who attended Davo Sculdun's party is performed by Aidan Cook and voiced by Claire Roi Harvey. Senator Den Gane and Senator Nico are both performed by Caitlin Nicholas and voiced by Colin Purves.

== Episodes ==
Season	Episodes	Originally released	
Season	Episodes	First released	Last released
1	12	September 21, 2022	November 23, 2022
2	12	April 22, 2025	May 13, 2025

=== Season 1 (2022) ===
No. overall	No. in season	Title	Directed by	Written by	Original release date
1	1	"Kassa"	Toby Haynes	Tony Gilroy	September 21, 2022
Five years before the Battle of Yavin, Cassian Andor looks for his missing sister on the industrial planet of Morlana One. Cassian is antagonized in a brothel by two Pre-Mor Corporate Security officers, leading to an altercation where he kills one accidentally then murders the other. On his home planet of Ferrix, he attempts to hide his involvement by convincing his adoptive mother, Maarva, her droid, B2EMO, and his friend, Brasso, to cover for him. In possession of an N-S9 Starpath unit, a valuable piece of Imperial navigation technology, Cassian asks his friend Bix Caleen to connect him with a black-market buyer, which she reluctantly agrees to. Meanwhile, Bix's boyfriend, Timm, is suspicious of Cassian. To improve his rapport with Imperial authorities, Morlana One's chief inspector of security elects to cover up the two killings. However, his deputy, the dutiful Syril Karn, is determined to solve the case. He identifies Cassian's ship, traces it to Ferrix and learns that he is originally from the tribal planet Kenari. In a flashback, a younger Cassian, known as Kassa, joins a group on Kenari investigating a crashed ship. Kassa rebuffs his younger sister's efforts to join the search, leaving her behind in their encampment.
2	2	"That Would Be Me"	Toby Haynes	Tony Gilroy	September 21, 2022
Timm, still suspicious of Bix's relationship with Cassian, reports Cassian to Pre-Mor Security, which has issued a warrant for his arrest. Syril enlists Sergeant Linus Mosk, an equally zealous Pre-Mor officer, to help arrest Cassian. B2EMO informs Cassian and Maarva of the warrant, and Cassian prepares to flee the planet. Meanwhile, Luthen Rael, Bix's buyer, travels to Ferrix to obtain the Starpath unit. In a flashback, Kassa's group locate the crashed ship near a massive abandoned industrial strip-mining operation. When their leader is killed by a crew member of the downed ship, the tribe kills the attacker and flees from the crash site. Kassa stays behind to explore the ship.
3	3	"Reckoning"	Toby Haynes	Tony Gilroy	September 21, 2022
Luthen arrives on Ferrix and meets Cassian in an abandoned factory. Syril and Mosk also appear with a dozen security men and confront Maarva, who refuses to cooperate. Intercepting a transmission from Cassian to B2EMO, Syril pinpoints Cassian's position. Cassian intends to sell the Starpath unit and leave Ferrix, but Luthen tries to recruit him into his rebel network, citing Cassian's repeated success at stealing from and sabotaging Imperial ships. When Syril's security men raid the factory, Luthen's preparation and experience help the two men escape the factory, subduing Karn along the way. After learning of Timm's betrayal, Bix rushes to aid Cassian, only to be stopped by the "Corpos." Timm is killed when he attempts to intervene. One of the landing pods in which the security team arrived is sabotaged by Brasso and destroyed. Luthen and Cassian eventually escape the planet while Syril and Mosk radio a request for evacuation. In a flashback, Maarva and her husband, Clem, scavenge the crashed ship on Kenari and find Kassa. Maarva decides to take him with them, fearing for his life if he is discovered there by the Republic.
4	4	"Aldhani"	Susanna White	Dan Gilroy	September 28, 2022
Luthen takes Cassian to the planet Aldhani, posting him to a robbery mission there. Cassian is reluctant but eventually agrees to cooperate. Luthen asks him to use a pseudonym among the rebels, and Cassian chooses 'Clem'. Having promised Cassian 200,000 credits as payment, Luthen gives him a kyber crystal as a down payment, requesting its return upon completion of the job. Vel, the rebel group's leader, introduces Cassian to the rest of the team (Skeen, Taramyn, Nemik, and Cinta, as well as Imperial Lieutenant Gorn) but keeps Luthen's involvement a secret. They explain to Cassian that they plan on stealing the payroll of an Imperial sector from the Aldhani garrison in three days' time. They will be taking advantage of "The Eye," a rare natural phenomenon in Aldhani's sky, to make a timed escape, given the slow speed of their getaway vehicle. Meanwhile on Coruscant, Luthen, living a double life as an antiques dealer, meets with Senator Mon Mothma, and they discuss the challenges of keeping their opposition to the Empire hidden. Syril returns to live with his mother Eedy on Coruscant after being castigated and fired by Imperial supervisor Blevin, with the Morlana system being placed under Imperial authority. Imperial Security Bureau (ISB) Lieutenant Dedra Meero seeks access and authority over the Ferrix incident regarding the recovered Starpath unit, but is opposed by Blevin and their superior Major Partagaz.
5	5	"The Axe Forgets"	Susanna White	Dan Gilroy	October 5, 2022
On Aldhani, Cassian hides his past from the others and is met with distrust, particularly from Skeen. Nemik attempts to enlighten Cassian on his ideals of the rebellion, while Taramyn trains Cassian and the others for the heist. Lieutenant Gorn molds his men to fit his purposes of assisting the robbery, while growing more and more disgusted with the lack of respect shown towards the Dhanis. While traveling to the garrison, Cassian reveals that he is a mercenary after Skeen discovers the kyber crystal, and Vel struggles to maintain cohesion amidst the tension. On Coruscant, Syril tensely discusses new career prospects with Eedy. Mon Mothma establishes a new charitable foundation while managing increasingly bitter relationships with her husband Perrin and daughter Leida. Supervisor Blevin seizes a hotel as the new ISB headquarters on Ferrix. Meanwhile, his rival Dedra and her assistant Heert reach the conclusion that the rebels are conducting a series of coordinated heists on Imperial assets. Luthen anxiously awaits a transmission from Vel's group, with his assistant Kleya Marki preaching a calm head.
6	6	"The Eye"	Susanna White	Dan Gilroy	October 12, 2022
Aided by Gorn, the rebels infiltrate the garrison by posing as an escort squad for Gorn's superior, Commandant Jayhold Beehaz. As the Dhanis arrive and begin to celebrate The Eye, the group take Beehaz's family hostage, kill a colonel, and force Beehaz to give them access to the payroll vault. While loading the credits onto a freighter, the group are discovered by Imperial forces. Gorn and Taramyn are killed in the ensuing firefight and Cinta escapes on foot disguised as an officer, while Cassian, Nemik, Skeen, and Vel escape aboard the freighter. Nemik is crushed by an unsecured load of credits on takeoff, but is able to navigate Cassian through The Eye to safety. Landing on a remote planet to tend to Nemik's severe and ultimately fatal injuries, Skeen secretly proposes to Cassian that they betray Vel and split the payroll between themselves. Cassian kills Skeen, reports the conversation to Vel, and informs her of his intention to take the sum he was promised as payment, leaving her the rest, including Luthen's crystal. Vel gives Cassian Nemik's manifesto in accordance with his dying wish. Back on Coruscant, the ISB agents are gathered to formulate reprisals to the heist, while Luthen quietly celebrates.
7	7	"Announcement"	Benjamin Caron	Stephen Schiff	October 19, 2022
On Coruscant, Syril starts a new job at the Bureau of Standards. Colonel Wullf Yularen announces that the ISB has gained more surveillance and punitive authority, while Dedra is challenged by Blevin for breaking protocol by accessing Imperial data without authorization. She persuades their superiors of the value of her work and is granted oversight of Ferrix. Luthen's assistant Kleya instructs Vel to find and kill Cassian to protect Luthen's identity. Mon Mothma meets with Tay Kolma, an old friend and banker, and asks him to help her access family funds. Cassian returns to Ferrix to settle old debts and learns that people blame him for the Imperial security crackdown there. The presence of stormtroopers on Ferrix reminds him of the murder of his adoptive father, Clem, by Imperial clone troopers at a protest on Rix Road. Cassian tries to persuade Maarva to leave Ferrix with him, but she decides to stay and resist the increased Imperial presence. Cassian travels to the tourist paradise of Niamos, adopting the name "Keef Girgo". Some time later, as he walks along the beachfront to a store, he is unjustly arrested by a shoretrooper for supposedly fleeing the scene of rebel activities, and sentenced to six years of imprisonment.
8	8	"Narkina 5"	Toby Haynes	Beau Willimon	October 26, 2022
Cassian is brought to the Narkina 5 island prison, a hard labor camp with thousands of prisoners manufacturing Imperial machinery. His floor manager, Kino Loy, inducts him into the strict disciplinary regime. Vel and Cinta travel to Ferrix to search for Cassian. When Maarva falls ill, Bix attempts to contact Luthen about Cassian's whereabouts, but Luthen, heeding Kleya's counsel, does not answer. Luthen then leaves Coruscant to meet with Saw Gerrera. He attempts to hire Gerrera's rebel cell as air support for a raid on an Imperial power station at Spellhaus organized by Anto Kreegyr, but is turned down. Dedra questions Syril about his experiences on Ferrix, but declines his offer to help with her investigation. She leads a unit to Ferrix herself, where she apprehends Bix.
9	9	"Nobody's Listening!"	Toby Haynes	Beau Willimon	November 2, 2022
Dedra and Imperial scientist Dr. Gorst torture Bix for information and discover that Cassian may have been involved in the Aldhani heist. However, because of Bix's lack of knowledge, they fail to learn anything about Luthen, whom Dedra has dubbed "Axis", observing that much Rebel activity is centered around him. The ISB capture a Rebel pilot from Kreegyr's group, who reveals that a power station on Spellhaus is set to be raided. Mon Mothma reunites with Vel, revealed to be her cousin, and encourages her to keep a low profile, maintaining the facade of a rich and apolitical young woman. Mon Mothma and Tay Kolma continue working to covertly gather funds for rebel activities. Meanwhile, an elderly member of Cassian's prison work crew named Ulaf is euthanized by a prison medic when he suffers a massive stroke days from his release date. The medic confirms to Cassian and Kino a disturbing rumor: a prisoner being "released" at the end of his sentence was sent back around to work at the same prison and the guards killed all the prisoners on that level in a cover-up. As the two realize that they will never be released alive, Cassian convinces Kino to attempt a breakout.
10	10	"One Way Out"	Toby Haynes	Beau Willimon	November 9, 2022
After talking with Cassian, Kino convinces his shift to join and improve upon the escape plan. The next day, Cassian disables his unit's security system, allowing the prisoners to overpower the few guards and escape. Kino uses the prison's intercom system to incite rebellion throughout the rest of the prison, but reveals that he can't swim. Cassian swims with the other escapees and reaches land. Mon Mothma meets with Davo Sculdun, a shady businessman offering financial help for her projects, but declines after Sculdun requests that she arrange a meeting between her 13-year-old daughter Leida and his 14-year-old son Stekan, a step towards their Chandrilan tradition of arranged marriage. ISB supervisor Lonni Jung, secretly a rebel informant, meets with Luthen and updates him on ISB activities. The two men reflect on how they are both trapped in their roles.
11	11	"Daughter of Ferrix"	Benjamin Caron	Tony Gilroy	November 16, 2022
Maarva dies, prompting a large funeral gathering on Ferrix, which Dedra authorizes in the hopes that Andor will attend. Vel informs Kleya of Maarva's death and learns of Mon Mothma's reluctant plan to marry off Leida. Leida begins taking part in gatherings that promote Chandrilan traditions, much to the distress of Mon Mothma and Vel. Syril learns about the funeral from Linus Mosk. Saw Gerrera decides at the last moment to assist Kreegyr's attack on Spellhaus, but Luthen advises him against it, revealing that the plan has leaked to the ISB. To avoid attracting suspicion from the ISB, Saw agrees to let Kreegyr and his men be ambushed by imperial forces. Flying back to Coruscant, Luthen escapes from an Imperial patrol, destroying several TIE fighters and the tractor beam deployed by a Cantwell-Class Arrestor Cruiser. (Note: Named in honor of Colin Cantwell.) On Narkina 5, with help from Keredians Dewi and Freedi, Cassian and fellow prisoner Ruescott Melshi are able to escape the moon and recover Cassian's belongings from Niamos. They part ways after Cassian discovers that Maarva has died, intending to publicly expose the injustice in the Imperial prison system.
12	12	"Rix Road"	Benjamin Caron	Tony Gilroy	November 23, 2022
Cassian returns to Ferrix for Maarva's funeral and learns of Bix's imprisonment. Dedra and the local Imperial garrison prepare to capture Andor for questioning regarding "Axis". Using the Imperial ambush as cover, Luthen plans, with Vel and Cinta's assistance, to kill Cassian to protect Rebel secrets. The ISB succeed in stopping Kreegyr's attack but leave no prisoners, angering Dedra. Leida is introduced to Sculdun's son. At Maarva's funeral, B2EMO plays a recorded speech by Maarva that rallies the populace to fight the Empire, kindling a riot. During the confusion, Cassian rescues Bix, while Syril saves Dedra from an attack. Meeting with B2EMO, Brasso, and several others in a shipyard, Cassian convinces them to take Bix away from Ferrix to safety. Moved by the rebellion on Ferrix, Luthen returns to his ship where Cassian is waiting. Deducing Luthen's intentions, Cassian challenges Luthen to either kill him or take him in, to which Luthen smiles. In a post-credits scene, droids assemble the machinery produced by the Narkina 5 prisoners in the firing dish of the Death Star.

=== Season 2 (2025) ===
No. overall	No. in season	Title	Directed by	Written by	Original release date
13	1	"One Year Later"	Ariel Kleiman	Tony Gilroy	April 22, 2025
One year after the Ferrix uprising, Cassian impersonates an Imperial test pilot to steal a prototype of a new Imperial ship, the TIE Avenger. Delivering it to a jungle moon, he is ambushed by a rogue band of squabbling guerillas, the Maya Pei Brigade. On the agricultural planet Mina-Rau, Bix, Brasso, Wilmon, and B2EMO fear detection by the Empire while in the undocumented employ of a local farmer; Bix suffers from PTSD caused by Gorst's torture. On Chandrila, Mon Mothma prepares for her daughter Leida's arranged marriage, but is informed by Tay Kolma that his financial investments have turned sour, ironically due to rebel interference, and that he feels underappreciated for his help in resolving Mon's financial irregularities. Orson Krennic oversees a secret meeting of Imperial officers who plan to use force to obtain the rare mineral resources of the planet Ghorman, an initiative to which Dedra is reluctantly assigned. Dedra suggests that the mission's anti-Ghorman propaganda be accompanied by the provocation of a weak insurgency that the Empire can discredit. The tension among the Maya Pei insurgents reaches a boiling point, and they kill several of their own as Cassian is taken hostage.
14	2	"Sagrona Teema"	Ariel Kleiman	Tony Gilroy	April 22, 2025
On the jungle moon, Cassian is held prisoner while the Maya Pei Brigade splits into two territorial factions at a stalemate. On Mina-Rau, Imperial officers audit the workers' papers; Bix, Brasso, and Wilmon arrange to move to a different part of the planet to avoid discovery. On Coruscant, Dedra and Syril, now a couple living together, prepare for a social event they have been putting off. As the preparations for Leida's wedding conclude, Mothma discusses the possibility of Tay's defection with Luthen, who says they should attempt to ascertain Tay's price for keeping silent about the Rebellion. Cassian slips away from his captors as their conflict escalates and flees the moon (revealed to be Yavin IV) in the stolen TIE Avenger.
15	3	"Harvest"	Ariel Kleiman	Tony Gilroy	April 22, 2025
Cassian makes contact with Kleya and is able to ascertain the danger his friends are in on Mina-Rau. Dedra and Syril host Syril's mother Eedy for dinner, during which Eedy repeatedly belittles Syril, prompting Dedra to establish firm boundaries with her. On Chandrila, Leida's arranged marriage to Stekan Sculdun takes place, followed by a lavish reception. As the Ferrix fugitives prepare to leave Mina-Rau, Imperial officer Lieutenant Krole sexually assaults Bix, but she kills him in a violent struggle. In the ensuing skirmish, Brasso is killed by a stormtrooper. Cassian arrives in the TIE Avenger and dispatches the Imperial troops. Bix and Wilmon flee on the TIE Avenger with Cassian, all devastated by Brasso's death. Having been unable to come up with a price to ensure Tay's silence, Luthen informs Mothma that he has decided to have him killed. Mon, distressed, engulfs herself in drinking and dancing as Vel watches Tay get taken away by Cinta.
16	4	"Ever Been to Ghorman?"	Ariel Kleiman	Beau Willimon	April 29, 2025
One year after the incident on Mina-Rau, Cassian and Bix have become active operators for Luthen and hide out on Coruscant; Bix is still beset by nightmares. On Ghorman, the Empire begins to construct an armory. Syril, with Dedra and Partagaz's backing, takes up a position in Palmo, the Ghorman capital, and infiltrates the Ghorman Front, the local rebel group, by feigning sympathy to their cause. Upon learning from Jung that Dedra is secretly supervising the ISB's operations on the planet, Luthen sends Cassian to assess the rebels. Wilmon is tasked with teaching Saw Gerrera's lieutenant Pluti how to configure a machine that extracts rhydonium, a fuel source for the Empire's starships that they plan to steal. Mothma unsuccessfully attempts to rally support to kill the renewal of a bill giving broad powers to the ISB.
17	5	"I Have Friends Everywhere"	Ariel Kleiman	Beau Willimon	April 29, 2025
Kleya learns that Sculdun intends to audit his antiquity collection having discovered a forgery, thus threatening to expose a bug she has planted in his gallery and forcing her to extract it during his upcoming Investiture party. Cassian connects with the Ghorman rebels and learns that they plan to intercept a weapons shipment, but he judges them to be too inexperienced and shoots down the plan, much to their frustration. Syril reports back to Coruscant with news of this heist, with Partagaz and Dedra agreeing to allow it to pan out to stir up the rebels. Saw kills Pluti after learning that he is a traitor, and has Wilmon work the extractor on the heist in his place.
18	6	"What a Festive Evening"	Ariel Kleiman	Beau Willimon	April 29, 2025
Cassian insists to Luthen that Ghorman's rebels are unprepared, and is resentful that Luthen secretly made contact with Bix to persuade her to return to action. Luthen chastises him for his short-sighted vision and instead sends Vel and Cinta to help the rebels pull off the heist. Vel and Cinta fully reconcile and rekindle their romance. The heist is successful, but one of the fighters disobeys Vel's orders and brings a blaster, only to accidentally kill Cinta when a passerby interferes, devastating Vel. At Sculdun's Investiture party, Krennic and Mothma debate the ethics of war while Kleya manages to extract her bug using Jung as a distraction. Bix breaks into Gorst's new office and uses his own torture device on him before leaving with Cassian, who remotely blows up the facility.
19	7	"Messenger"	Janus Metz	Dan Gilroy	May 6, 2025
One year later, the Rebels have begun coordinating military operations on Yavin IV, where Cassian and Bix now live. Wilmon tells them that Dedra is on Ghorman—whose rebel activities have been portrayed by state-sponsored media as terrorism instigated by outside agitators—and encourages Cassian to help assassinate her. Despite his concerns over the mission being from Luthen, Cassian agrees and travels with Wilmon to Ghorman. Bix is told by a Force healer that Cassian will be vital to the Rebellion. On Ghorman, Dedra finds her position temporarily supplanted by Captain Kaido, sent by Partagaz to oversee the Imperial subjugation of the planet, while Syril begins to doubt Dedra's line on outside agitators, given his interactions with the rebels.
20	8	"Who Are You?"	Janus Metz	Dan Gilroy	May 6, 2025
Kaido instigates a protest in Palmo's central square while closing off the available exits, and intentionally deploys inexperienced riot police into the volatile crowd. Arriving in the square alongside the protestors, Syril realizes his role in enabling the Empire's manipulative actions and violently confronts Dedra in her office, beginning to strangle her, and forcing her to tell him the truth about the Empire's intentions on Ghorman before he storms out. Following a directive from Partagaz, Dedra reluctantly orders an Imperial sniper to open fire on a member of the riot police unit, triggering a shootout between the rebels and the Imperial forces. The protestors attempt to flee, but are massacred by Imperial blaster fire and KX security droids. Amidst the chaos, a dazed Syril wanders the square as Cassian seeks to assassinate Dedra through her office window. Syril spots Cassian and recognizes him, and proceeds to physically attack him. The two fight and Syril gains the upper hand, taking Cassian’s gun, but hesitates to shoot him; Syril is then shot dead by Carro Rylanz, the Ghorman rebel leader. The resistance manages to incapacitate a KX enforcer droid by ramming it with an armored vehicle. Cassian escapes Ghorman with the droid while Wilmon stays to aid his Ghorman girlfriend Dreena in broadcasting the news to the galaxy. In the aftermath, Dedra and Eedy separately confront their losses as Imperial news outlets place blame on outside agitators for the violence on Ghorman.
21	9	"Welcome to the Rebellion"	Janus Metz	Dan Gilroy	May 6, 2025
In the aftermath of the Ghorman massacre, the Empire frames the incident as an insurrection. Mothma writes a Senate speech denouncing Emperor Palpatine and prepares to flee to Yavin IV. Senator Bail Organa chooses to stay behind to aid the Rebellion in secret. Luthen learns from Jung that Bail's security team is compromised and assigns Cassian to extract Mothma from Coruscant. Meanwhile, Luthen clashes with Mothma over the depth of his subterfuge within the Rebellion and his choice to have Tay killed. With Organa's help, Mothma takes the floor of the Senate and powerfully condemns Emperor Palpatine and the genocidal Empire's manipulation of the truth. Cassian convinces Mothma to leave with him, killing the spy in Organa's rival security team and Mothma's ISB-planted driver Kloris; he brings Mothma to the safehouse on Coruscant where she publicly positions herself with the Rebellion. (Note: This leads directly into the events of the Star Wars Rebels episode "Secret Cargo".) Cassian accompanies the injured Wilmon back to Yavin IV. Disturbed by recent events, Cassian resolves to leave and begin a new life with Bix, but Bix departs during the night, leaving Cassian a message that implores him to stay and help the Rebellion and promises that she will find him again once it succeeds. Later, technicians reprogram K-2SO, the stolen KX droid, to serve the Rebellion.
22	10	"Make It Stop"	Alonso Ruizpalacios	Tom Bissell	May 13, 2025
One year after the events on Ghorman, Lonni reports to Luthen that the Empire's grand energy project is actually a weapon, and that Dedra has likely uncovered their identities. Though Luthen initially promises Lonni and his family safe passage from Coruscant, he kills him to ensure his silence. As Luthen destroys the communications system in his shop, Dedra confronts him with the stolen Starpath unit, deducing he is Axis. Luthen attempts suicide to avoid interrogation, but is taken alive to a hospital, while Kleya watches from afar. Flashbacks reveal that Luthen is a former Imperial sergeant, Lear, who defected after his unit massacred Kleya's hometown. Finding Kleya hiding on his ship, he informally adopts her and they begin selling antiques while waging resistance against the Empire. In the present, Dedra is arrested for her overreach, and Kleya infiltrates the hospital and disconnects Luthen's life support system.
23	11	"Who Else Knows?"	Alonso Ruizpalacios	Tom Bissell	May 13, 2025
Dedra is interrogated by Krennic, who admonishes her for allowing sensitive information about the secret Imperial weapons project to be leaked from her database, and for confronting Luthen without sufficient backup. The investigation into Dedra is assigned to her former assistant, Heert, who identifies Kleya from security footage. Partagaz declares Kleya a public health concern to expedite her arrest. In the Coruscant safehouse, Kleya sends Wilmon a distress signal, prompting him to send Cassian, Melshi, and K-2SO there to retrieve Luthen, alienating the group further from Yavin IV leadership. Dedra gives Heert insight into Luthen's communications technologies from her cell, enabling his team to track Kleya's signal to the safehouse, where they arrive close behind Cassian and Melshi. Kleya passes on Luthen's crucial intelligence, but asks to stay behind given the distrust of Luthen among the rebels on Yavin IV. As Heert's team closes in, K-2SO breaks into the building in pursuit.
24	12	"Jedha, Kyber, Erso"	Alonso Ruizpalacios	Tom Bissell	May 13, 2025
K-2SO kills Heert and his team, but Kleya is wounded. Cassian, Melshi, and K-2SO take her back to Yavin IV where they are grounded by Organa for their disobedience. Much of the Rebel leadership, including Organa, are scornful of Luthen and question the veracity of his new intelligence, but Mothma is willing to hear Kleya out. Vel speaks with Cassian, who convinces her of Luthen's integrity; the two toast their fallen comrades, while Kleya comes to terms with her new role on Yavin IV. Interrupted while listening to Nemik's rebel manifesto, Partagaz commits suicide just as he is about to be arrested. Dedra is imprisoned in a prison facility similar to Narkina 5 and breaks down crying. When a Rebel informant associated with Saw repeatedly contacts Yavin IV to talk with Cassian, Draven realizes that the evidence for the Imperial weapons project is too great to be a trap. After meeting with Draven and Mothma, Organa agrees to let Cassian and K-2SO fly to Kafrene to meet with the informant. (Note: This leads directly into the events of Rogue One.) On Mina-Rau, B2EMO plays with another droid, as Bix cradles a baby and looks wistfully toward the horizon.

== Production ==
=== Development ===
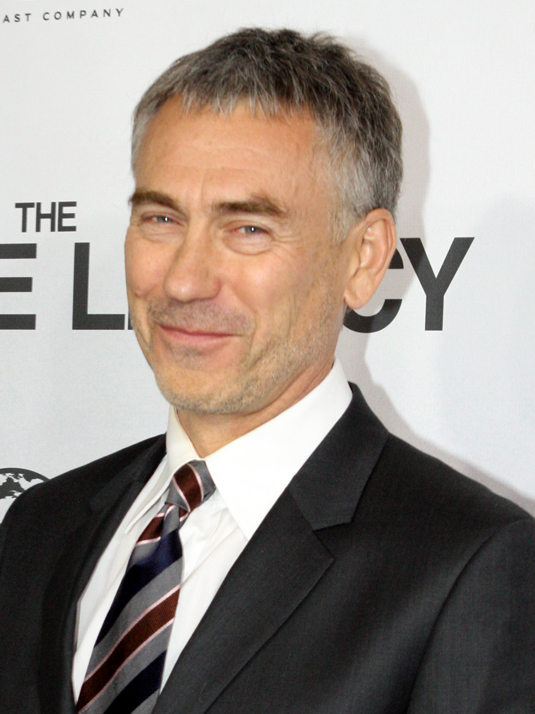
Tony Gilroy joined the series after working on the Star Wars film Rogue One, and took over development after sharing his vision with the studio.

Disney CEO Bob Iger announced in November 2017 that Disney and Lucasfilm were developing live-action Star Wars television series for the new streaming service Disney+. One of these series was revealed a year later to be a prequel to the film Rogue One (2016). The series was described as a spy thriller show focused on the character Cassian Andor, with Diego Luna reprising his role from the film. Production was expected to begin in 2019 after Luna completed filming the second season of Narcos: Mexico (2020). Jared Bush originally developed the series, writing a pilot script and series bible for the project.

By the end of November 2018, Stephen Schiff was serving as showrunner and executive producer of the series, whose working title was Pilgrim. Tony Gilroy, who was credited as a co-writer on Rogue One and oversaw extensive reshoots for the film, joined the series by early 2019 when he discussed the first story details with Luna. Gilroy, having received an earlier version of the script, compared Andor's relationship with K-2SO to that of Butch Cassidy and the Sundance Kid, and felt it was "totally limited and claustrophobic". As such, he had sent a letter to Lucasfilm president Kathleen Kennedy explaining his vision for the series. By the next year, Kennedy had contacted Gilroy to ask if he was interested in joining the series. In July 2019, Rick Famuyiwa was in early talks to direct several episodes after doing the same for The Mandalorian (2019–2023), the first live-action Star Wars series. Gilroy's involvement was revealed that October, when he was set to write the first episode, direct multiple episodes and work alongside Schiff; Gilroy had officially replaced Schiff as showrunner by April 2020. Six weeks of pre-production for the series had taken place in the United Kingdom by then, but this was halted and production on the series delayed due to the COVID-19 pandemic. Pre-production had begun again by September ahead of a planned filming start the next month. At that time, Gilroy, who is based in New York, chose not to travel to the UK for production on the series due to the pandemic, and was therefore unable to direct the series' first episode. Instead, the UK-based Toby Haynes, who was already "high on the list" of potential directors for the series, was hired to direct the first three episodes. Gilroy would remain executive producer and showrunner. Kennedy announced the series' title, Andor, in December 2020, along with its 2022 release date. Luna was revealed to be an executive producer on the series, which was set to consist of 12 episodes. In February 2021, Ben Caron and Susanna White were set as additional directors. Sanne Wohlenberg and Michelle Rejwan also executive produced.

In February 2022, star Stellan Skarsgård indicated that the series would have a second season, with filming for it beginning in late 2022. That April, cinematographer Adriano Goldman said there had originally been plans for the series to last five seasons, but he believed those had changed and that it was now expected to last three. At Star Wars Celebration a month later, Lucasfilm confirmed a 12-episode second season. Gilroy explained that the original five-season plan was deemed to be "physically impossible" due to the series' scale, and instead they realized that they could end the series with one more season that led directly into the events of Rogue One.

=== Writing ===
In addition to Gilroy and Schiff, writers for the series include Beau Willimon and Gilroy's brother Dan. Gilroy urged his writing team to put aside their personal reverence and nostalgia for Star Wars, fearing that such an attitude could change their behavior and work. Gilroy wanted the series to be accessible to all viewers, not just Star Wars fans, with the hope that those fans would be able to watch the series with their friends and family who may not be interested in the rest of the franchise. He had also wanted to ensure the series was grounded in reality, and had identified the main "navigational Star Wars piece of information" as being the calendar. During the first writers' room meeting, Gilroy had prepared a 100-page outline for the series, as he had already mapped out the structure. Willimon and Dan Gilroy were present, in addition to executive producer Sanne Wohlenberg and production designer, Luke Hull. They had discussed the story for five days. Luna expressed his excitement at being able to further explore the character he had originated in Rogue One.

Since Andor is a prequel to the film, Luna said it was, "nice to go into a story [of which] you already know the ending. Now you can [flesh out] the nuances and the layers. I think it's fun to do something that isn't just about getting to the end. It's about delaying that." Luna was able to suggest elements of the character's backstory that he had thought of during the filming of Rogue One, and was grateful that Gilroy made the character a refugee. He explained, "It's the journey of a migrant, which to me is everything I come from. That feeling of having to move is behind this story very profoundly." Luna felt that because of this, it was "difficult to find out where he comes from," and felt that Andor wanted to "find the opportunities, the freedom, the chances they don't find where they're born." He had also felt that Andor's character was important to members of the Hispanic and Latin American community, and wanted the "energy" of Mexico–United States relations to be represented in Andor's journey. Gilroy wanted to expand upon Andor's backstory, and had used dialogue said by him in Rogue One - "I've been in this fight since I was six years old!" - as a starting point. In the development process, Gilroy had labelled it, "The Education of Cassian Andor". From there, he had created the planet Kenari as his childhood home, where he had lived with other children, and no adult supervision. Gilroy had compared it to being a "Lord of the Flies (1954)-like tribe," with Andor's separation from the tribe also serving as an introduction to Maarva and Clem Andor, desiring to introduce the audience to the Ferrix culture early on as the writing team had spent time creating its social structure. Towards the beginning, he had described Maarva as loving Andor "as much as she could possibly love him," though in the beginning of the series, she had been disappointed by the direction of Andor's life. As the series had progressed, Gilroy wanted to develop the emotional connection between them.

The first season begins five years before Rogue One and tells one year of Andor's story when he first becomes a revolutionary. The next four years are then covered by the second season, which leads directly into the events of the film. Gilroy approached the two seasons as two-halves of a novel and described the show beginning as "a very simple, almost film noir situation for a thief [Andor]. A skeevy kind of guy gets in big trouble, tries to sell something he has to save his ass". Luna said the series was about the building of a revolution, and said it was important to explore "the revolutionary we can become to change things, to stop war, to make this world a livable place" which he felt was relevant to real-world issues. Gilroy stated, "This guy gave his life for the galaxy, right? I mean, he consciously, soberly, without vanity or recognition, sacrificed himself. Who does that?" He wanted to explore that idea in the first season, beginning with Andor "being really revolution-averse, and cynical, and lost, and kind of a mess". The season shows the destruction of Andor's homeworld when he was a boy and is then based on Andor's adopted planet, which becomes radicalized against the Empire.

Luna and Gilroy said the series was also about "how the disenfranchised can stand up to effect change". Gilroy had not intentionally written the show to create political commentary and rejected the notion of being influenced by contemporary events, but said that it had come "instinctively", as his primary priority was characterization and serving the story. The writing team had used history as a "catalog" for the story with Gilroy further explaining that people can interpret the characters however they wish, but the main intention was for the audience to connect to them. Co-star Fiona Shaw described Gilroy's political commentary in the scripts as a "great, scurrilous [take] on the Trumpian world", adding that "our world is exploding in different places right now, people's rights are disappearing, and Andor reflects that. [In the show] the Empire is taking over, and it feels like the same thing is happening in reality, too". Meanwhile, Gough has stated that her character arc in the series deals with gender politics, while Gilroy explained that "We have a very, very, very deep dive into the Imperial side of the story". Gilroy had written Gough's character, Meero, with the intention of making her relatable to the audience as she had been putting genuine effort into doing her job and "fighting her way up in a male environment". After starting with Andor's story in the first three episodes, the fourth begins to expand the scope of the series to include the rest of its large ensemble cast, such as Rebel leader Mon Mothma, whose path will cross with Andor's in the second season. Gilroy felt Star Wars fans would see Mothma in a new light after watching the series, and added that there were key characters and events in the series that would be different or "more interesting" than fans previously realized: "What you've been told, what's on Wookieepedia... is really all wrong".

Tony Gilroy, Dan Gilroy and Beau Willimon returned to write for the second season, and were joined by Tom Bissell. The final three episodes of the second season cover the three days prior to the start of Rogue One, with Gilroy saying "it'll be, like, four or five days, and then we'll jump a year, and then there'll be another four or five days, and then we jump a year", with the final shot leading into Rogue One. While developing the season, Gilroy briefly considered to include Palpatine, but ultimately felt he was "too heavy to lift" into the plot. Likewise, Gilroy never considered including Darth Vader in the story as he feels that writing the character is "really limiting". Another classic character considered to appear in the season early on was Princess Leia, with Gilroy having early conversations with Kennedy and Pablo Hidalgo about having her appear as a sixteen-year-old teenager during the Investiture Week at the Galactic Senate in "Welcome to the Rebellion" due to her occupation as a politician, figuring out a scene where Leia would meet Mothma in an attempt to make "the most" of the sequence with all the political parties involved, but the idea didn't meet traction due to becoming a "distraction" from the story and didn't progress beyond a concept. In regards to any Rogue One characters, Gilroy preferred to honor the film and keep it straight, opting to not bring Felicity Jones back as Jyn Erso for a "lame" cameo that would have felt "really disrespectful" if he could instead deal with Daniel Mays' informant Tivik for the last episode, though he did consider bringing back Riz Ahmed as Bodhi Rook before desisting because doing so would have involved "throwing all the timeline off and unpicking a lot of the plotting". For K-2SO's introduction in the season, Dan Gilroy originally wrote an entirely self-contained story for the season's ninth episode that played like a horror film, with K2 searching a huge freighter ship for rebels, but budget issues meant the show's crew couldn't afford its production and consolidated things instead, so they opted to move up Mon Mothma's Senate speech one episode, as it had been originally slated to occur in the tenth episode. In retrospective, Tony Gilroy was glad to scrap that episode, as the need to extend existing set usage to save money meant more screen time and effort was given to the eight and ninth episodes, namely to the Ghorman Massacre and Mon Mothma's escape from the Galactic Senate. Genevieve O'Reilly provided Tony Gilroy with input when writing Mothma's speech denouncing the Empire's role in the Ghorman Massacre in the ninth episode of the second season. While Gilroy had initially only written sections of the monologue which were to be spliced into a bigger montage, O'Reilly convinced him to write an entire speech. According to O'Reilly, filming for the scene occurred in May 2023. Gilroy expressed that after gaining confidence in Dulau's acting abilities from director feedback during the production of the first season, he did not want to leave the relationship between Kleya and Luthen ambiguous or explained by other creators, leading to the creation of the flashback scenes in "Make It Stop", depicting their relationship, which was inspired by the road movie Paper Moon (1973).

=== Design ===
Luke Hull served as production designer on the series, and described it as "very cinematic". Neal Scanlan provided the creature and droid effects after doing the same for all of Disney's Star Wars films, including Rogue One. He said his team was treating the series the same as they did the films, and due to Gilroy's involvement the series would fit within the same "pocket of [Star Wars] history" as Rogue One with a "slightly harder edge" than other Star Wars projects. Scanlan added that unused creatures developed for the films could be brought back for the series, alongside newly created creatures. An outdoor city set, which co-star Adria Arjona estimated to be three to five city blocks long, was built practically for the series.

=== Casting ===
Diego Luna was confirmed to be reprising his role as Cassian Andor from Rogue One with the series' announcement in November 2018. In April 2019, Alan Tudyk was announced as also reprising his Rogue One role of K-2SO. A year later, Stellan Skarsgård, Kyle Soller, Genevieve O'Reilly, and Denise Gough joined the cast. O'Reilly reprised her role of Mon Mothma from Rogue One and other Star Wars media. Adria Arjona joined the cast in August 2020, and Fiona Shaw was revealed to also be appearing in December, when Tudyk was not included in an official cast list. A month later, Tudyk confirmed that he would no longer be appearing in the first season due to Gilroy's story changes but he could appear in potential future seasons; he ultimately appeared in season 2. CCH Pounder was originally cast in Fiona Shaw's role Maarva Andor, but dropped out before filming. Robert Emms was cast in a supporting role in June 2021, when Skarsgård revealed that Forest Whitaker was reprising his role as Saw Gerrera from Rogue One. In February 2022, David Hayman confirmed that he had a role in the series after being spotted by fans during filming. Joplin Sibtain appears as Brasso, Cassian's co-worker and friend. The character was originally portrayed by Rory McCann, before he had to leave the production following a knee injury during filming. Since McCann had already shot some scenes, CGI was used to superimpose Sibtain's face on scenes already filmed. McCann was later cast to replace Ray Stevenson as Baylan Skoll in Star Wars: Ahsoka (2023–present). The first season has over 200 named cast members and over 6,000 extras.

Luna, Skarsgård, O'Reilly, Soller, Arjona, Gough, Marsay, Sethu, Elizabeth Dulau, Whitaker, Emms, Anton Lesser and Muhannad Bhaier reprise their roles in the second season, among others. In March 2023, set footage revealed that Benjamin Bratt had been cast for the second season in an undisclosed role, later revealed to be Bail Organa, replacing Jimmy Smits in the role. In June 2024, Ben Mendelsohn was revealed to be reprising his role as Orson Krennic from Rogue One in the second season. Tudyk appears in the second season.

=== Filming ===
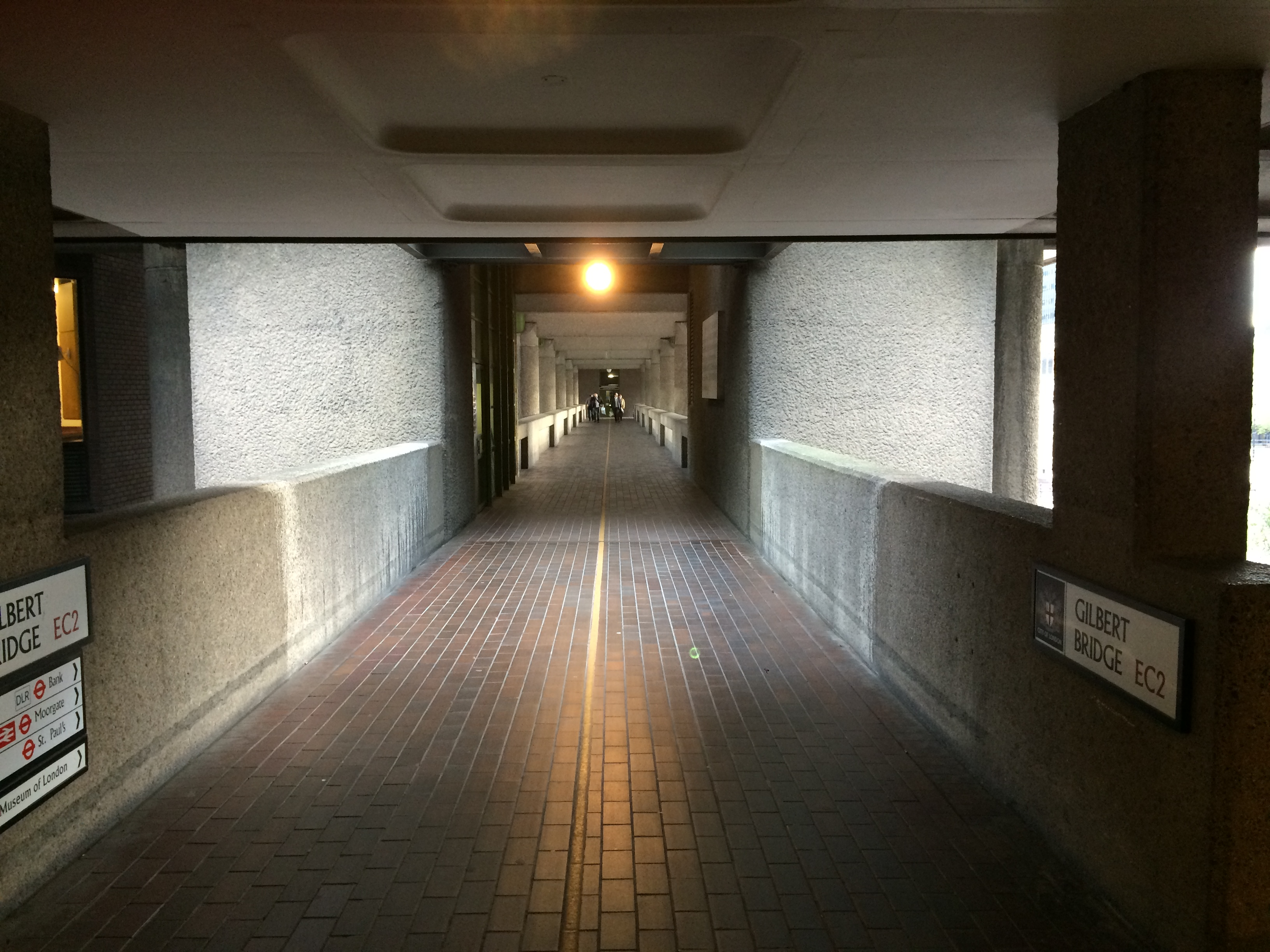
Barbican Arts Centre, used for Coruscant

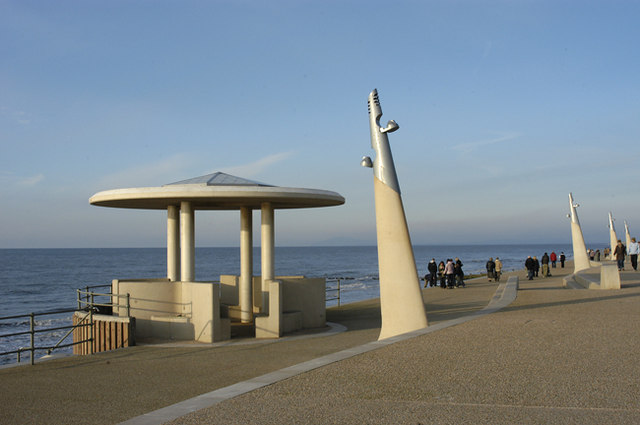
Cleveleys, used for the resort planet Niamos

Filming began in London, England, at the end of November 2020, with the production based at Pinewood Studios. The series was filmed under the working title Pilgrim, and was the first live-action Star Wars series to not make use of the StageCraft digital background technology. This was done because the scripts were more suited to being filmed on locations and large sets, and Luna noted that taking a different filming approach for the series made it similar to Rogue One, whose filming style was distinct from other Star Wars films. Toby Haynes directed the first three episodes, with Benjamin Caron, Susanna White, and Haynes each directing another "block" of three episodes. Jonathan Freeman and Adriano Goldman served as cinematographers. The series was previously reported to begin filming in 2019, and then June 2020, but was delayed multiple times due to the COVID-19 pandemic. Both UK and U.S. COVID-19 protocols were followed on set, including daily temperature checks and tests for COVID-19 three times a week. Filming at Pinewood Studios was expected to end in July 2021.

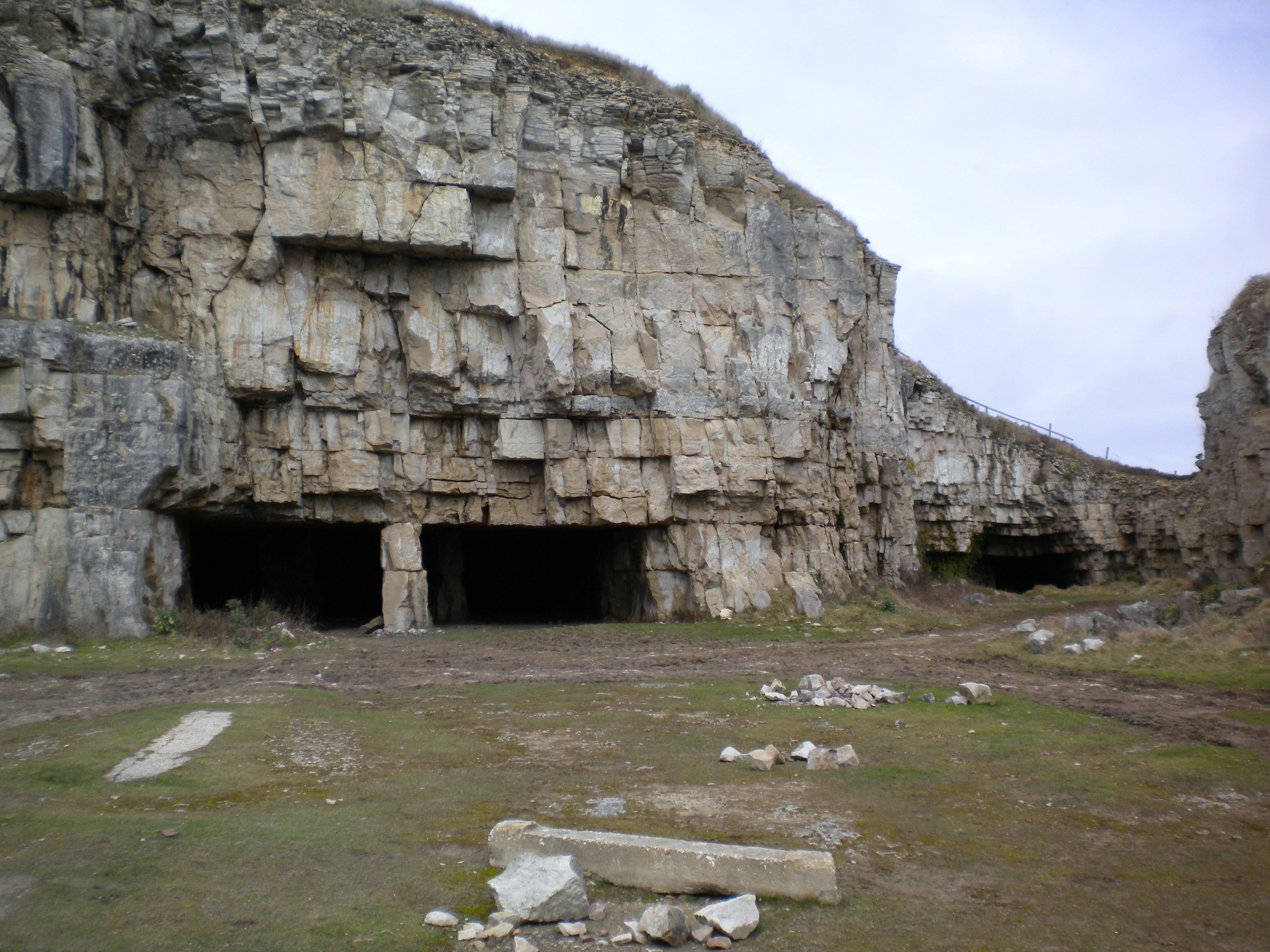
Winspit quarry, used for Saw Gerrera's base in the first season

By late January 2021, a large village set had been built on the grounds of a former quarry in Little Marlow, Buckinghamshire, not far from Pinewood Studios, with filming expected to last there until April. Filming in April also took place at the Coryton Refinery in Corringham, Essex, and in East London at Canary Wharf where the plaza under the bridge to the Elizabeth line station served as the entrance to the Imperial Security Bureau on Coruscant. Canary Wharf had also been a filming location for Rogue One. The concrete walkways of the Barbican Centre were used to represent buildings on Coruscant. Several days of filming occurred in Cleveleys on the Fylde Coast of Lancashire in early May, with the town's promenade and beach area dressed as an alien location, later revealed to be the resort planet of Niamos followed by another several days filming in the disused Winspit quarry in Dorset. Second unit and location filming began for at least a week at the end of May in Black Park, a country park in Buckinghamshire near Pinewood Studios which was also used for filming Disney's Star Wars films. By the end of May, main production on Pilgrim had moved to Glen Tilt in Perthshire, Scotland, and was expected to continue there until late June. Around 500 crewmembers traveled to Oban, Scotland, for filming at the nearby Cruachan Dam. This started by June 18, with sets built around the dam and filming also happening in its tunnels. From June 22 to 24, filming took place at Middle Peak Quarry near Wirksworth, Derbyshire. Production was expected to wrap in mid-2021, and Luna confirmed that it had finished by September 27.

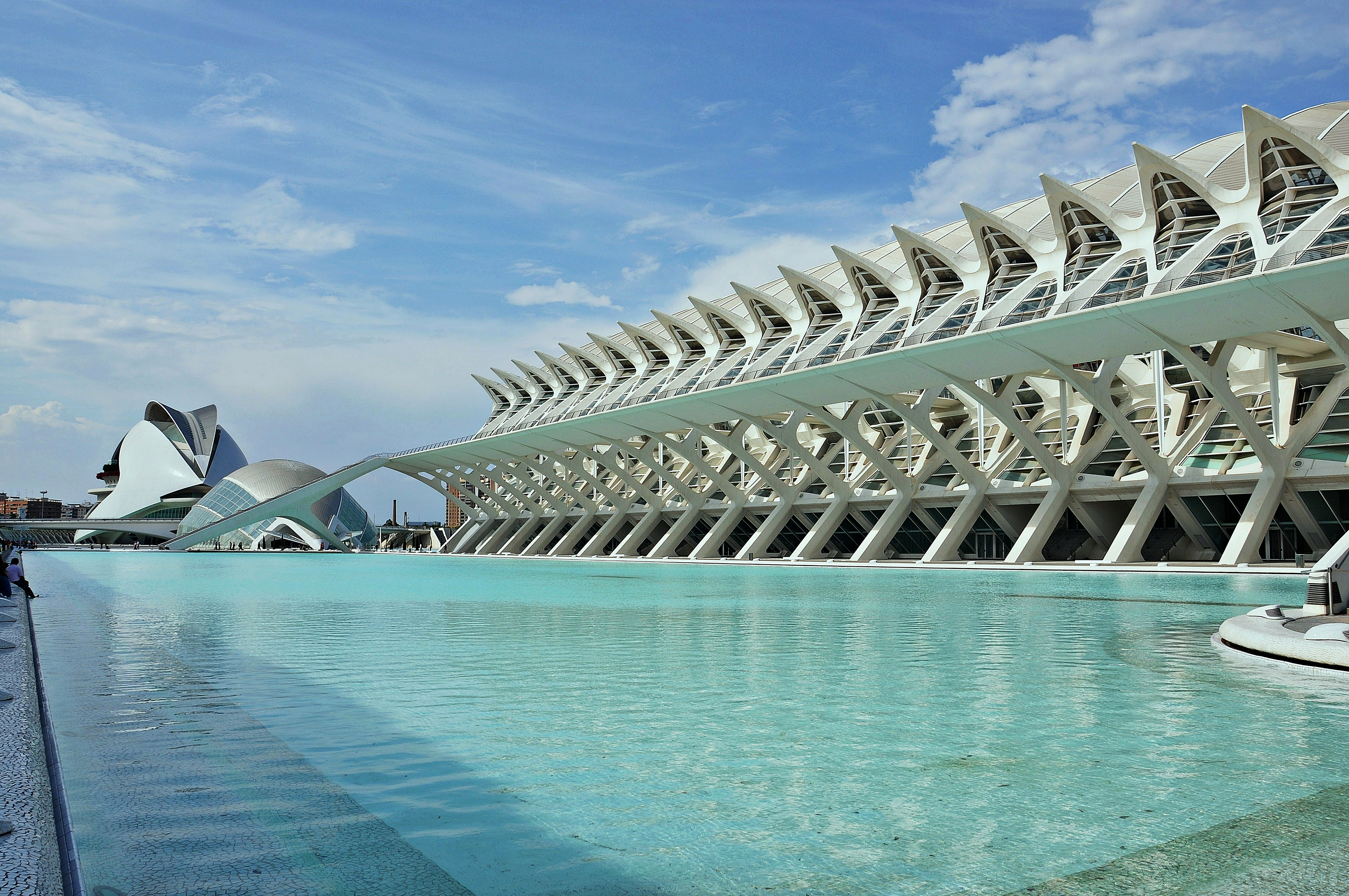
The City of Arts and Sciences in Valencia, used for the Senate exterior in the second season

The second season began filming on November 21, 2022, and was expected to last until August 2023, with Gilroy anticipating a year for post-production as with the first season. Episodes were once again filmed in "blocks" of three episodes at a time, with each block moving the story a year closer to the events of Rogue One. Gilroy stated he would not direct in the second season because of his commitments as showrunner. Ariel Kleiman, Janus Metz, and Alonso Ruizpalacios directed episodes of the second season, with Kleiman directing six episodes. In March 2023 Season 2 was revealed to be filming in Xàtiva and Valencia with director Metz among the cast and crew including actor Benjamin Bratt indicating he had joined the series. In April 2023, filming was suspended in Winspit Quarry, near Worth Matravers in Dorset due to landslip concerns. The next month filming was suspended again due to the 2023 Writers Guild of America strike. By that June, production had been approximately halfway completed. In June 2023, filming took place at Hever Castle in Kent. In July 2023, filming was cut short for the duration of the 2023 SAG-AFTRA strike, with plans to resume production after both strikes concluded. Filming resumed in early January 2024 and wrapped on February 9, 2024.

== Music ==
Gilroy contacted Nicholas Britell about composing for the series in 2020, before filming began so he could compose source music that would be played on set. Gilroy and Britell, who are neighbors in Manhattan, first met for the project in August 2020. Kennedy and Gilroy wanted the series to have a unique sound, and Britell said it would be "orchestral-plus" with a "wide range of sounds" including some that he had created. He added that the large scope of the series meant that "every episode has new demands, new music, and new ideas. It's important that as the story evolves, the music should evolve too." Britell was publicly revealed to be the series' composer in February 2022, and was still working on it that May when he said they had been "working nonstop for months, actually years, at this point". Recording was underway by then at AIR Lyndhurst studios in London, with a full orchestra. Britell was unable to travel to London due to the pandemic, but had a team in place there that also worked with him on other television series.

For season two, Britell did not return to score due to scheduling conflicts. He was replaced by Brandon Roberts. Britell did however write a limited amount of music for season two and is credited as the main composer of episodes four and five.

== Marketing ==
A sizzle reel featuring behind-the-scenes footage of pre-production and filming was released during Disney's Investors Day presentation in December 2020, when the series' title and cast were officially announced by Kennedy. Gilroy, Luna, and O'Reilly promoted the series at Star Wars Celebration in May 2022, where they revealed the first teaser trailer. The Hollywood Reporter's Aaron Couch said it showed the "gritty side" of the Star Wars universe. Daniel Chin of The Ringer felt the series had a unique identity in the Star Wars franchise, with a darker tone, and said the teaser "paints a picture of the formative years of the rebellion against the Empire". Ryan Scott from /Film felt the teaser gave the "most comprehensive view at the show up to this point". He said the series could explore the morality behind the Rebels, writing that while they are usually seen as heroes there is also "much gray area in there to be explored". Writing for CNET, Sean Keane felt the trailer did not give much away but gave an "intriguing taste of the show's espionage tone".

Luna promoted the series and debuted the official trailer on Good Morning America on August 1. Hattie Lindert from The A.V. Club highlighted the action scenes in the trailer, saying, "In addition to the epic scale and darker tone, the series also promises intense fight scenes created with limited green screen use" and also noted Gilroy's experience with action films due to his work on the Jason Bourne films. The Hollywood Reporter's James Hibberd enjoyed Andor's increased screen-time in the trailer compared to the teaser, and felt the series was a "welcome scenic change from the company's previous Star Wars shows". At CNN, Scottie Andrew felt it "reveals a bit more about Andor's evolution from common thief to galactic martyr". Luna and Kennedy promoted the series at the 2022 D23 Expo, with CNET's Keane writing, "The trailer paints a pretty grim setup for revolutionary fighter Cassian Andor and his pals, as fighting the Empire and row upon row of Stormtroopers looks like a one-way ticket to death". Meanwhile, Collider's Rachel Leishman felt the trailer "gives us a bit more of a look at where the rebellion is and who is fighting back against the Empire" and was excited about the portrayal of the Empire in the series, writing, "Seeing these little missions and the feelings that the rebels have towards the Empire feels so perfectly align with what we know about Cassian that this trailer really just has us excited for what is to come with the series".

Footage from the second season was shown at Star Wars Celebration London in April 2023. A trailer for the second season was shown at the 2024 D23 Expo. The official teaser trailer for the second season was released on February 24, 2025.

== Release ==
=== Streaming ===
Andor premiered on Disney+ on September 21, 2022, with the first three episodes being released. The rest of the 12-episode first season was released weekly, until November 23, 2022. The series previously was expected to debut in 2021, before production was delayed by the COVID-19 pandemic. It was originally set to premiere on August 31 with two episodes. In November 2022, Disney announced that the first two episodes of the first season would air on ABC on November 23, on FX on November 24, and Freeform on November 25, and be available on Hulu from November 23 through December 7. A similar move was to be also replicated across various countries in Europe, including Portugal, Spain, Poland and the Netherlands, with the first two episodes airing on Fox, on November 24 or 25, depending on the country.

The second season, also consisting of 12 episodes, was expected to be released in August 2024, but because of delays in production due to the 2023 Hollywood labor disputes, it premiered on April 22, 2025, with three episodes released weekly until May 13.

=== Home media ===
The first season of Andor was released on Ultra HD Blu-ray and Blu-ray by Walt Disney Studios Home Entertainment on April 30, 2024, with SteelBook packaging, concept art cards, and bonus features, including featurettes.

Andor: Season 1 had 59% of its sales come from the 4K Ultra HD Blu-ray version, which helped it secure the number one spot on the 4K chart. It also ranked third on the Blu-ray chart for the week ending May 4, 2024.

== Reception ==
=== Viewership ===
==== Season 1 ====
Whip Media's TV Time, which tracks viewership data for the more than 25 million worldwide users, reported that Andor was the second most-anticipated new television series for September 2022. It was the third most-streamed original series in the U.S. for the week of October 16. It subsequently became the top original series every week from October 23 though November 27. JustWatch, a guide to streaming content with access to data from more than 20 million users around the world, stated that Andor was the most-streamed series in the U.S. for the week of September 25. It remained in the top ten from November 7–20. The streaming aggregator Reelgood, which tracks real-time data from 5 million U.S. users for original and acquired content across SVOD and AVOD services, announced that Andor was the most-watched program for the week of September 28. It remained in the top ten from October 5 to November 11.

Nielsen Media Research, which records streaming viewership on certain U.S. television screens, estimated that the series was watched for 356 million minutes from October 3–9. It was subsequently watched for 418 million minutes from October 17–23, according to Nielsen. Streaming analytics firm FlixPatrol, which monitors daily updated VOD charts and streaming ratings across the globe, reported that Andor was the ninth most-streamed series on Disney+ in 2022. According to the file-sharing news website TorrentFreak, Andor was the tenth most-watched pirated television series of 2022. Andor generated over $300 million in global streaming subscriber revenue for Disney+ from its debut in September 2022 through the end of 2024. It surpassed the performance of other Star Wars live-action series like The Book of Boba Fett and Ahsoka.

Andor experienced lower viewership compared to other Star Wars series. Time attributed this to factors such as "franchise fatigue," insufficient fan service, competition from other fantasy and sci-fi shows, and the "lackluster Obi-Wan Kenobi" miniseries. MovieWeb noted that despite some initial reports suggesting lower demand, Andor still managed to perform well, with audience demand significantly higher than average streaming shows. Market research company Parrot Analytics, which looks at consumer engagement in consumer research, streaming, downloads, and on social media, reported that Andor's audience demand was 34.1 times higher than that of the average TV show, with The Mandalorian close behind at 34 times the average demand, from October 15–21, 2022. Parrot Analytics subsequently announced that it was the most in-demand United States breakout television series, referring to shows that have premiered in the past 100 days, from November 12–18, 2022. Andor had 37.7 times the average demand of all other series in the United States.

==== Season 2 ====
Parrot analytics revealed that Andor led Canadian demand among digital original series for the week of April 20–27, following the April 22 premiere of its second season on Disney+. The show achieved a demand average of 46.1 times the market average, placing it at No. 1 on the Top 10 Digital Originals chart in Canada. It also ranked No. 3 overall across all TV shows in the country (including linear, pay TV, SVOD, and AVOD), with a demand average of 46, behind The Last of Us and Saturday Night Live. Whip Media announced that Andor was the top streaming original series in the U.S. for the week ending April 27, as well as for the week ending May 18. Reelgood stated it was the second most-streamed series in the U.S. for the week ending April 30. JustWatch reported that Andor was among the five most-streamed shows in the U.S. from April 28 to May 4, before moving to the top three between May 5–11. The series reached first place during the week of May 12–18.

Analytics company Samba TV, which gathers viewership data from certain smart TVs and content providers, revealed that Andor attracted 1.2 million U.S. households who watched the first episode within the first six days. This figure matches the viewership for the premiere episode of Andor Season 1 over the same time span in September 2022. Nielsen Media Research estimated that the series was watched for 721 million minutes in the U.S. from April 21–27. Approximately 65% of Andor's viewing total during the measured period was attributed to the first three new episodes, suggesting that some viewers were also revisiting Season 1. The series was also the most male-skewing title of the week, with 67% of its audience identifying as male. During the week of April 28 to May 4, Andor recorded 821 million minutes of watch time, ranking as the sixth most-streamed program- The following week, from May 5–11, the series garnered 830 million minutes of watch time, becoming the fifth most-streamed program. From May 12–18, Andor accumulated 931 million minutes of watch time, making it the most-streamed program during that week. By the end of 2025, Nielsen estimated the show accumulated 7.4 billion minutes, the most of any live-action series on Disney+ that year. Additional, Nielsen claimed Andor was the most streamed Star Wars title across Millennials and Gen X (ages 30-61) in the first fiscal quarter of 2026.

Luminate, which measures streaming performance in the United States using viewership data, audience engagement metrics, and content reach across multiple platforms, stated that Andor Season 2 demonstrated strong viewership growth due to its unique release strategy—dropping three episodes per week over four weeks. This approach defied the typical audience drop-off seen in other Star Wars series such as Ahsoka and Skeleton Crew. While those series peaked in their second week, Andor built momentum steadily, culminating in its highest single-day viewership—171 million minutes—with the release of its final batch of episodes. Audience retention between episodes remained stable, with only a 20% drop from episode 3 to episode 4, compared to a 31% decline for Ahsoka. Season 1 had already shown long-term appeal, growing its total audience by 46% over a year, outperforming Ahsoka (20%) and The Mandalorian Season 3 (21%). Nielsen Media Research reported that from June 1, 2024, to May 31, 2025, Andor was streamed for a total of 88 million hours. Luminate subsequently announced that Andor was streamed for 918.1 million minutes during the first half of 2026.

=== Critical response ===
==== Season 1 ====
The review aggregator website Rotten Tomatoes reported an approval rating of 96% with an average rating of 8.45/10 based on 606 critic reviews. The website's critics consensus reads, "A gritty adventure told from the ground perspective of the Empire's reign, Andor is an exceptionally mature and political entry into the Star Wars mythos – and one of the best yet." Metacritic, which uses a weighted average, assigned a score of 74 out of 100 based on 31 critics, indicating "generally favorable reviews".

Andor was considered one of the best TV series of 2022, and was praised for its differences from other Star Wars shows. NPR's Mandalit del Barco summarized that Andor was "being hailed as the most complex, mature story in Star Wars lore". In a four star review, Jack Seale of The Guardian called Andor "the best Star Wars show since The Mandalorian". Caroline Framke of Variety was positive towards Andor's departure from other Star Wars projects with a "story of people who have nothing to do with Solos, Skywalkers or Palpatines, but whose lives matter nonetheless". Similarly, Nicholas Quah of the Vulture called the show "a breath of fresh air" and praised the "utter confidence of its storytelling", "richness of its political ideas", score, production design and dialogue.

Simon Cardy of IGN praised the characters and character development, calling it "one of the very best things ever to come out of the Star Wars universe" in a 9 out of 10 review. The characterizations were criticized by Mike Hale of The New York Times, who considered them thin and unfulfilling.

Critics noted that the season emphasized the benign evils of bureaucracy, with SlashFilm stating that "The mundane Imperial Bureaucracy in Andor is the most chilling Star Wars villain yet," and Collider noting that Emperor Palpatine is not the greatest threat, but instead it is "every middle management bureaucrat 'just following orders.'" Similarly, Salon noted that the show "pierces that fantasy by placing a tight focus on the familiar bureaucracy monotony and drudgery that eventually leads to the destruction of planets." Los Angeles Times critics tied the themes back to contemporary politics, stating that "modern authoritarian regimes have an elite cadre of college graduates and professionals doing all the real work of dictatorship behind the scenes. 'Andor' shows us the complicity machine propping up Palpatine, who never appears on camera, because he doesn’t need to."

==== Season 2 ====
Rotten Tomatoes reported an approval rating of 97% with an average rating of 8.9/10 based on 212 critic reviews. The website's critics consensus reads, "Investing startling conviction and gravity into the Star Wars sandbox, Andor's superb second season lights a fire of rebellion that heats up the screen." Metacritic assigned a score of 92 out of 100 based on 34 critics, indicating "universal acclaim".

Writing for Collider, Maggie Lovett wrote that "the only flaw in the entire series is the fact that it's over now. Luckily, it is an end worthy of one of the most impactful characters Star Wars has ever created, with this grand finale a triumph for both Gilroy and Luna." Writing for Vulture, Nicholas Quah wrote that "[Andor's] second season doesn't just cement the show's standing as the best Star Wars project ever made. Andor reorients that fantasy in the service of something greater than itself. Andor is a miracle, and we'd be so lucky if we see something like it ever again."

In a review for Empire, Sophie Butcher wrote the second season was "beautifully made, cleverly structured and genuinely moving," and "solidifies Tony Gilroy's spin-off as one of the greats. This is Star Wars — and small-screen storytelling in general — at its best." Writing for the World Socialist Web Site, Jane Wise praised the series for its portrayal of the "ravages of imperialist violence and encroachment." She also wrote that "the scenes and characters in Andor are not allegorical, they speak to contemporary conditions and processes."

It was named as the best show of 2025 by Empire, IGN, Screen Rant, The AV Club, The Ringer, Variety, Rogerebert.com and Vulture — and among the best shows by the AFI, Hollywood Reporter, Slate, and USA Today.

=== Accolades ===
Andor was critically acclaimed and consistently ranked first in the top ten on numerous publications' "Best of 2022" lists for television series, including those of IGN, Polygon, USA Today, Vulture, and Empire. Numerous publications also considered Andor the best Star Wars television show and one of the best Star Wars productions ever. The first season was nominated for three Primetime Emmy Awards, including Outstanding Drama Series. The second season was nominated for three Primetime Emmy Awards, including Outstanding Drama Series.

Accolades received by Andor
Award	Year	Category	Recipient(s)	Result	Ref.
American Cinema Editors Awards	2023	Best Edited Drama Series	Simon Smith (for "One Way Out")	Won	
American Cinema Editors Awards	2026	Best Edited Drama Series	Yan Miles (for "Who Are You?")	Nominated	
Art Directors Guild Awards	2023	Excellence in Production Design for a One-Hour Fantasy Single-Camera Series	Luke Hull (for "Rix Road")	Nominated	
Art Directors Guild Awards	2026	Excellence in Production Design for a One-Hour Fantasy Single-Camera Series	Luke Hull (for "Who Are You?")	Won	
Astra Creative Arts Awards	2025	Best Makeup	Andor	Nominated	
Astra Creative Arts Awards	2025	Best Visual Effects	Andor	Nominated	
Astra Creative Arts TV Awards	2024	Best Guest Actor in a Drama Series	Andy Serkis	Nominated	
Astra Creative Arts TV Awards	2024	Best Casting in a Drama Series	Andor	Nominated	
Astra Creative Arts TV Awards	2024	Best Fantasy or Science Fiction Costumes	Andor	Nominated	
Astra Creative Arts TV Awards	2024	Best Stunts	Andor	Nominated	
Astra TV Awards	2024	Best Streaming Series, Drama	Andor	Nominated	
Astra TV Awards	2024	Best Actor in a Streaming Series, Drama	Diego Luna	Nominated	
Astra TV Awards	2024	Best Supporting Actor in a Streaming Series, Drama	Stellan Skarsgård	Nominated	
Astra TV Awards	2024	Best Supporting Actress in a Streaming Series, Drama	Genevieve O'Reilly	Nominated	
Astra TV Awards	2024	Best Directing in a Streaming Series, Drama	Benjamin Caron (for "Rix Road")	Nominated	
Astra TV Awards	2024	Best Writing in a Streaming Series, Drama	Tony Gilroy (for "Rix Road")	Nominated	
Astra TV Awards	2025	Best Drama Series	Andor	Nominated	
Astra TV Awards	2025	Best Cast Ensemble in a Streaming Drama Series	Andor	Nominated	
Astra TV Awards	2025	Best Directing in a Drama Series	Ariel Kleiman (for "One Year Later")	Nominated	
Astra TV Awards	2025	Best Writing in a Drama Series	Tony Gilroy (for "One Year Later")	Nominated	
Black Reel Television Awards	2023	Outstanding Guest Performance, Drama Series	Forest Whitaker	Nominated	
British Academy Television Awards	2023	Best Supporting Actress	Fiona Shaw	Nominated	
British Academy Television Craft Awards	2023	Best Editing: Fiction	Frances Parker (for "Announcement")	Nominated	
British Academy Television Craft Awards	2023	Best Special, Visual Effects	Mohen Leo, TJ Falls, Richard Van Den Bergh, and Jean-Clément Soret	Nominated	
British Academy Television Craft Awards	2026	Best Costume Design	Michael Wilkinson (for "Harvest")	Nominated	
British Academy Television Craft Awards	2026	Best Director: Fiction	Janus Metz	Nominated	
British Academy Television Craft Awards	2026	Best Editing: Fiction	Yan Miles (for "Who Are You?")	Nominated	
British Academy Television Craft Awards	2026	Best Production Design	Luke Hull, Rebecca Alleway, Toby Britton	Nominated	
British Academy Television Craft Awards	2026	Best Sound: Fiction	Danny Hambrook, David Acord, Margit Pfeiffer, James Spencer, Josh Gold, John Finklea	Nominated	
British Academy Television Craft Awards	2026	Best Special, Visual Effects	Mohen Leo, TJ Falls, Luke Murphy, Neal Scanlan, Jean-Clément Soret	Won	
British Society of Cinematographers Awards	2022	Best Cinematography in a Television Drama	Adriano Goldman (for "One Way Out")	Nominated	
Critics' Choice Television Awards	2023	Best Drama Series	Andor	Nominated	
Critics' Choice Television Awards	2023	Best Actor in a Drama Series	Diego Luna	Nominated	
Critics' Choice Super Awards	2023	Best Science Fiction/Fantasy Series, Limited Series or Made-for-TV Movie	Andor	Won (Note: Shared with Stranger Things.)	
Critics' Choice Super Awards	2023	Best Actor in a Science Fiction/Fantasy Series, Limited Series or Made-for-TV Movie	Diego Luna	Nominated	
Critics' Choice Super Awards	2023	Best Actress in a Science Fiction/Fantasy Series, Limited Series or Made-for-TV Movie	Fiona Shaw	Nominated	
Critics' Choice Super Awards	2025	Best Science Fiction/Fantasy Series, Limited Series or Made-for-TV Movie	Andor	Won	
Critics' Choice Super Awards	2025	Best Actor in a Science Fiction/Fantasy Series, Limited Series or Made-for-TV Movie	Diego Luna	Won	
Critics' Choice Super Awards	2025	Best Actress in a Science Fiction/Fantasy Series, Limited Series or Made-for-TV Movie	Adria Arjona	Nominated	
Directors Guild of America Awards	2026	Outstanding Directorial Achievement in Dramatic Series	Janus Metz (for "Who Are You?")	Nominated	
Dorian TV Awards	2025	Best TV Drama	Andor	Nominated	
Dorian TV Awards	2025	Best Written TV Show	Andor	Nominated	
Dorian TV Awards	2025	Best TV Performance – Drama	Diego Luna	Nominated	
Dorian TV Awards	2025	Best Supporting TV Performance – Drama	Genevieve O'Reilly	Nominated	
Dorian TV Awards	2025	Best Genre TV Show	Andor	Won	
Dorian TV Awards	2025	Most Visually Striking TV Show	Andor	Nominated	
Golden Globe Awards	2023	Best Actor in a Television Series – Drama	Diego Luna	Nominated	
Golden Globe Awards	2026	Best Actor in a Television Series – Drama	Diego Luna	Nominated	
Golden Reel Awards	2023	Outstanding Achievement in Sound Editing – Broadcast Long Form Effects and Foley	David Acord, Margit Pfeiffer, J.R. Grubbs, Shaun Farley, John Roesch, and Shelley Roden (for "Reckoning")	Nominated	
Golden Trailer Awards	2023	Best Action for a TV/Streaming Series (Trailer/Teaser/TV Spot)	Andor	Won	
Hollywood Music in Media Awards	2025	Original Score – TV Show/Limited Series	Brandon Roberts and Nicholas Britell	Nominated	
Hugo Awards	2023	Best Dramatic Presentation (Long Form)	Andor (season 1)	Excluded (Note: Andor season 1 was excluded from the Hugo Award for Best Dramatic Presentation (Long Form) category under Rule 3.8.3 of the WSFS Constitution, which states that "if any series and a subset series thereof both receive sufficient nominations to appear on the final ballot, only the version which received more nominations shall appear". As "One Way Out" received more nominee votes in the Short Form category (262) than the 161 votes received by the season as a whole in the Long Form category, the series was excluded from the ballot. "Rix Road" received 191 nominee votes in the Short Form category.)	
Hugo Awards	2023	Best Dramatic Presentation (Short Form)	"One Way Out"	Nominated	
Hugo Awards	2023	Best Dramatic Presentation (Short Form)	"Rix Road"	Nominated	
Hugo Awards	2026	Best Dramatic Presentation (Long Form)	Andor (Season 2)	Nominated	
IGN Select Awards	2023	TV Series of the Year	Andor	Won	
MTV Movie & TV Awards	2023	Best Hero	Diego Luna	Nominated	
MTV Movie & TV Awards	2023	Best Fight	Escape from Narkina 5	Nominated	
Peabody Awards	2022	Entertainment	Andor	Won	
Peabody Awards	2025	Entertainment	Andor	Won	
Primetime Creative Arts Emmy Awards	2024	Outstanding Cinematography for a Series (One Hour)	Damián García (for "Rix Road")	Nominated	
Primetime Creative Arts Emmy Awards	2024	Outstanding Music Composition for a Series (Original Dramatic Score)	Nicholas Britell (for "Rix Road")	Nominated	
Primetime Creative Arts Emmy Awards	2024	Outstanding Original Main Title Theme Music	Nicholas Britell	Nominated	
Primetime Creative Arts Emmy Awards	2024	Outstanding Sound Editing for a Comedy or Drama Series (One-Hour)	David Acord, Margit Pfeiffer, Richard Quinn, Jonathan Greber, J.R. Grubbs, John Finklea, Shaun Farley, Shelley Roden, and John Roesch (for "The Eye")	Nominated	
Primetime Creative Arts Emmy Awards	2024	Outstanding Special Visual Effects in A Season or A Movie	Mohen Leo, TJ Falls, Richard Van Den Bergh, Neal Scanlan, Liyana Mansor, Scott Pritchard, Joseph Kasparian, Jelmer Boskma, and Jean-Clément Soret	Nominated	
Primetime Creative Arts Emmy Awards	2025	Outstanding Special Visual Effects in a Season or a Movie	Andor	Won	
Primetime Creative Arts Emmy Awards	2025	Outstanding Production Design for a Narrative Period or Fantasy Program (One Hour or More)	Luke Hull, Toby Britton, and Rebecca Alleway (for "Who Are You?")	Won	
Primetime Creative Arts Emmy Awards	2025	Outstanding Original Music and Lyrics	"We Are the Ghor (Planetary Anthem)" by Nicholas Britell and Tony Gilroy (for "Who Are You?")	Nominated	
Primetime Creative Arts Emmy Awards	2025	Outstanding Picture Editing for a Drama Series	Yan Miles (for "Who Are You?")	Won	
Primetime Creative Arts Emmy Awards	2025	Outstanding Music Composition for a Series (Original Dramatic Score)	Brandon Roberts (for "Who Are You?")	Nominated	
Primetime Creative Arts Emmy Awards	2025	Outstanding Sound Editing for a Comedy or Drama Series (One-Hour)	David Acord, Margit Pfeiffer, James Spencer, Josh Gold, Alyssa Nevarez, John Finklea, Ronni Brown, and Sean England (for "Who Are You?")	Nominated	
Primetime Creative Arts Emmy Awards	2025	Outstanding Sound Mixing for a Comedy or Drama Series (One-Hour)	David Acord, Danny Hambrook, Geoff Foster, and Richard Duarte (for "Who Are You?")	Nominated	
Primetime Creative Arts Emmy Awards	2025	Outstanding Guest Actor in a Drama Series	Forest Whitaker (for "I Have Friends Everywhere")	Nominated	
Primetime Creative Arts Emmy Awards	2025	Outstanding Cinematography for a Series (One Hour)	Christophe Nuyens (for "Harvest")	Nominated	
Primetime Creative Arts Emmy Awards	2025	Outstanding Fantasy/Sci-Fi Costumes	Michael Wilkinson, Kate O'Farrell, Richard Davies, and Paula Fajardo (for "Harvest")	Won	
Primetime Creative Arts Emmy Awards	2025	Outstanding Character Voice-Over Performance	Alan Tudyk as K-2SO (for "Who Else Knows?")	Nominated	
Primetime Emmy Awards	2024	Outstanding Drama Series	Sanne Wohlenberg, Tony Gilroy, Kathleen Kennedy, Diego Luna, Toby Haynes, Michelle Rejwan, Kate Hazell, and David Meanti	Nominated	
Primetime Emmy Awards	2024	Outstanding Directing for a Drama Series	Benjamin Caron (for "Rix Road")	Nominated	
Primetime Emmy Awards	2024	Outstanding Writing for a Drama Series	Beau Willimon (for "One Way Out")	Nominated	
Primetime Emmy Awards	2025	Outstanding Drama Series	Sanne Wohlenberg, Tony Gilroy, Kathleen Kennedy, Diego Luna, Luke Hull, John Gilroy, and David Meanti	Nominated	
Primetime Emmy Awards	2025	Outstanding Directing for a Drama Series	Janus Metz (for "Who Are You?")	Nominated	
Primetime Emmy Awards	2025	Outstanding Writing for a Drama Series	Dan Gilroy (for "Welcome to the Rebellion")	Won	
Producers Guild of America Awards	2023	Outstanding Producer of Episodic Television, Drama	Sanne Wohlenberg, Tony Gilroy, Kathleen Kennedy, Diego Luna, Toby Haynes, Michelle Rejwan, Kate Hazell, and David Meanti	Nominated	
Producers Guild of America Awards	2026	Outstanding Producer of Episodic Television, Drama	Andor	Nominated	
Satellite Awards	2026	Best Genre Series	Andor	Won	
Satellite Awards	2026	Best Actor in a Drama or Genre Series	Diego Luna	Won	
Satellite Awards	2026	Best Actress in a Drama or Genre Series	Genevieve O'Reilly	Nominated	
Saturn Awards	2023	Best Science Fiction Television Series	Andor	Nominated	
Saturn Awards	2023	Best New Genre Television Series	Andor	Won	
Saturn Awards	2023	Best Actor in a Television Series	Diego Luna	Nominated	
Saturn Awards	2023	Best Supporting Actress in a Television Series	Genevieve O'Reilly	Nominated	
Saturn Awards	2023	Best Guest Star in a Television Series	Andy Serkis	Nominated	
Saturn Awards	2025	Best Television Home Media Release	Season 1 – 4K Steelbook	Won	
Saturn Awards	2026	Best Science Fiction Television Series	Andor	Won	
Saturn Awards	2026	Best Actor in a Television Series	Diego Luna	Won	
Saturn Awards	2026	Best Supporting Actor in a Television Series	Stellan Skarsgård	Won	
Saturn Awards	2026	Best Supporting Actress in a Television Series	Denise Gough	Nominated	
Saturn Awards	2026	Best Supporting Actress in a Television Series	Genevieve O'Reilly	Nominated	
Screen Actors Guild Awards	2023	Outstanding Performance by a Stunt Ensemble in a Television Series	Andor	Nominated	
Set Decorators Society of America Awards	2024	Best Achievement in Décor/Design of a One Hour Fantasy or Science Fiction Series	Rebecca Alleway and Luke Hull	Nominated	
Society of Composers & Lyricists Awards	2023	Outstanding Score for Television	Nicholas Britell	Nominated	
Television Critics Association Awards	2023	Program of the Year	Andor	Nominated	
Television Critics Association Awards	2023	Outstanding New Program	Andor	Nominated	
Television Critics Association Awards	2023	Outstanding Achievement in Drama	Andor	Nominated	
Television Critics Association Awards	2025	Program of the Year	Andor	Nominated	
Television Critics Association Awards	2025	Outstanding Achievement in Drama	Andor	Nominated	
Television Critics Association Awards	2025	Individual Achievement in Drama	Diego Luna	Nominated	
Visual Effects Society Awards	2023	Outstanding Created Environment in an Episode, Commercial, or Real-Time Project	Pedro Santos, Chris Ford, Jeff Carson-Bartzis, and Alex Murtaza (for "Reckoning")	Nominated	
Visual Effects Society Awards	2026	Outstanding Special (Practical) Effects in a Photoreal Project	Luke Murphy, Dean Ford, Jody Eltham, Darrell Guyon (for "Who Are You")	Won	
Visual Effects Society Awards	2026	Outstanding Visual Effects in a Photoreal Episode	Mohen Leo, TJ Falls, Scott Pritchard, Olivier Beaulieu, Luke Murphy (for "Who Are You")	Nominated	
Visual Effects Society Awards	2026	Outstanding Environment in an Episodic, Commercial, Game Cinematic or Real-Time Project	John O'Connell, Falk Boje, Hasan Ilhan, Kevin George (for "Welcome to the Rebellion")	Won	
Writers Guild of America Awards	2023	Drama Series	Dan Gilroy, Tony Gilroy, Stephen Schiff, and Beau Willimon	Nominated	
Writers Guild of America Awards	2023	New Series	Dan Gilroy, Tony Gilroy, Stephen Schiff, and Beau Willimon	Nominated	
Writers Guild of America Awards	2026	Drama Series	Tom Bissell, Dan Gilroy, Tony Gilroy, Beau Willimon	Nominated	
