= Kassa (Andor) =

- Andor episode
- Episode no.: Season 1 Episode 1
- Directed by: Toby Haynes
- Written by: Tony Gilroy
- Cinematography by: Adriano Goldman
- Editing by: John Gilroy; Tim Porter
- Original release date: September 21, 2022
- Running time: 41 minutes

Cast
- Lee Boardman as Kravas; Stephen Wight as Verlo; Margaret Clunie as Hostess; Antonio Viña as Kassa; Victor Perez as Rashi; Joplin Sibtain as Brasso; Rupert Vansittart as Chief Hyne; James McArdle as Timm Karlo; Raymond Anum as Nurchi; Ian Whyte as Vetch; Muhannad Bhaier as Wilmon; Kieran O'Brien as Pegla

Episode chronology
← Previous —	Next → "That Would Be Me"

"Kassa" is the first episode and series premiere of the first season of the American streaming television series Andor, based on Star Wars created by George Lucas. It was written by Tony Gilroy and directed by Toby Haynes.

The episode stars Diego Luna as Cassian Andor, who reprises his role from the Star Wars spinoff film, Rogue One (2016). Haynes was hired in September 2020 after a production delay due the COVID-19 pandemic, and Gilroy joined the series as showrunner in early 2019, replacing Stephen Schiff. Both executive produce alongside Luna and Kathleen Kennedy.

"Kassa" was released on Disney+ on September 21, 2022, along with "That Would Be Me" and "Reckoning", as a three-part series premiere.

== Plot ==
Five years before the Battle of Yavin, Cassian Andor travels to the industrial planet of Morlana One on the trail of his missing sister. While searching for her in a brothel, Cassian is antagonized by two Pre-Mor Authority security officers. An altercation between the trio ensues outside the brothel, leading to Cassian accidentally killing one officer and executing the other.

Cassian flees to the planet Ferrix, where he attempts to hide his involvement by convincing B2EMO, the droid of his adoptive mother Maarva, and his friend Brasso to cover for him. Cassian also asks his friend Bix to connect him with a black market buyer, as Cassian has acquired a Starpath Unit, a valuable piece of Imperial navigation technology. Bix agrees and contacts the buyer, but her attempts to hide her connection with Cassian make her boyfriend, Timm, suspicious.

Back on Morlana One, the chief inspector of security elects to cover up the murders, to improve his report to the Imperial authorities, but his deputy, the ambitious Syril Karn, is determined to solve the case. Karn identifies Cassian's borrowed ship and traces it to Ferrix. In a flashback, a younger Cassian (Kassa) and his tribe on Kenari decide to investigate a crashed ship. He rebuffs his younger sister's efforts to join the search, however, leaving her behind in their tribal encampment.

== Production ==
=== Development ===
Disney CEO Bob Iger announced in February 2018 that there were several Star Wars series in development, and that November one was revealed as a prequel to the film Rogue One (2016). The series was described as a spy thriller show focused on the character Cassian Andor, with Diego Luna reprising his role from the film. Jared Bush originally developed the series, writing a pilot script and series bible for the project. By the end of November, Stephen Schiff was serving as showrunner and executive producer of the series. Tony Gilroy, who was credited as a co-writer on Rogue One and oversaw extensive reshoots for the film, joined the series by early 2019 when he discussed the first story details with Luna. Gilroy's involvement was revealed that October, when he was set to write the first episode, direct multiple episodes, and work alongside Schiff; Gilroy had officially replaced Schiff as showrunner by April 2020. Six weeks of pre-production for the series had taken place in the United Kingdom by then, but this was halted and production on the series delayed due to the COVID-19 pandemic. Pre-production had begun again by September ahead of a planned filming start the next month. At that time, Gilroy, who is based in New York, chose not to travel to the UK for production on the series due to the pandemic, and was therefore unable to direct the series' first episode. Instead, the UK-based Toby Haynes, who was already "high on the list" of potential directors for the series, was hired to direct the first three episodes. Gilroy would remain executive producer and showrunner. In December 2020, Luna was revealed to be executive producing the series.

The first episode, titled "Kassa", was written by Tony Gilroy.

=== Writing ===
The writing was structured so that a story arc is contained in every three episodes. For the first three episodes, Gilroy had wanted to address Andor's accent while also exploring his backstory further. He had originally created Andor's origin story while writing the series, and opted to include it earlier in the series to avoid having to "carry it through the whole show". Further describing it as a "contained piece", he had also commented "at some point, I [Gilroy] must have come up with the cutting pattern, and then the interesting thing became how to really tell the young Cassian story, how to stretch that out, and how to get the most out of it".

Gilroy had created the opening sequence, where Andor murders two Corporate Security officers, with the intention of ensuring he started with a "day where everything went completely wrong", with his intention to "start him [Andor] in as much trouble as I possibly could". It had also initiated the sequence of events in which Andor begins his journey, as Gilroy had cited "destiny" as being an element of his journey. Luna had also noted that Andor had to deliberately kill the other Corporate Security officer following his accidental murder of the first one as Andor had understood he would be arrested. He also opined that Andor made the decision as he was a "survivor, no matter what it takes" and cited the "absence of the institution that would provide justice" as being another reason such an event would take place. The encounter "casts a long shadow over the trajectory of [Andor's] future."

Adria Arjona also noted that Bix Caleen's relationship with Andor was ambiguous, saying that while they had a long friendship, it was not romantic, adding "trust has been built and then broken and then built back up and then broken again" while noting that Bix was a practical and loyal character intent on running her own business. She also felt that Bix had always "ends up picking him [Andor] over everything" and that his presence had always slightly disrupted her life. Arjona had personally interpreted that as a result, she had settled with Timm as he had also been a reliable partner with whom they can run the business together.

Flashbacks in the episode revealed that Andor's birth name is Kassa and one of the main reasons to include the flashbacks was to explain Andor's accent. The episode consisted of the first depiction of the BBY/ABY timescale (Before or After the Battle of Yavin) in any Star Wars series or film when it featured BBY 5 on the screen during the opening scene. Previously the scale was used in the expanded universe to create a timeline of the events of the franchise, with a zero point being the Battle of Yavin in A New Hope with the destruction of the first Death Star.

=== Casting ===
The episode stars Diego Luna as Cassian Andor, Kyle Soller as Syril Karn, Adria Arjona as Bix Caleen, Joplin Sibtain as Brasso, James McArdle as Timm Karlo, and Rupert Vansittart as Chief Hyne.

=== Filming ===
Filming began in London, England, at the end of November 2020, with the production based at Pinewood Studios. The series was filmed under the working title Pilgrim, and was the first live-action Star Wars series to not make use of the StageCraft digital background technology. Filming locations included Black Park in Buckinghamshire, England for the flashback scenes, as well as at Middle Peak Quarry in Derbyshire, England. For the action sequence towards the beginning of the episode, Gilroy had wanted to keep a closeup shot on Andor's face throughout his speech with the Corporate Security officers approaching him from behind.

=== Music ===
Nicholas Britell composed the musical score for the episode. The episode's soundtrack was released in October 2022 as part of the first volume for the series. The volume also consisted of the soundtracks for episodes 2-4.

Andor: Episode 1 (Original Soundtrack)
No.	Title	Length
1.	"Andor (Main Title Theme) – Episode 1"	1:18
2.	"WE BEGIN (Time Grappler)"	0:37
3.	"Niamos! (Morlana Club Mix)"	1:42
4.	"Morlana Drop"	1:45
5.	"Pre-Mor Shakedown"	0:57
6.	"B2"	1:17
7.	"Rix Road"	1:51
8.	"Bix Caleen"	0:50
9.	"Kenari Council"	1:48
10.	"Bix Has a Secret"	1:08
11.	"Kenari Male Wanted for Questioning"	0:59
12.	"The Cassian Way"	1:42
Total length:		15:54

== Release ==
"Kassa" was released on Disney+ on September 21, 2022. In November 2022, Disney announced that the first two episodes would air on ABC on November 23, on FX on November 24, and Freeform on November 25, and be available on Hulu from November 23 through December 7. A similar move was also replicated across various countries in Europe, including Portugal, Spain, Poland and the Netherlands, with the first two episodes airing on Fox, on November 24 or 25, depending on the country.

The episode, along with the rest of the first season of Andor was released on Ultra HD Blu-ray and Blu-ray by Walt Disney Studios Home Entertainment on April 30, 2024.

== Reception ==
=== Audience viewership ===
The first three episodes released at the same time and according to Nielsen Media Research who measure the number of minutes watched by United States audiences on television sets, Andor was the sixth-most watched original series across streaming services for the week of September 19–25, 2022, with 624 million minutes watched.

=== Critical response ===
The review aggregator website Rotten Tomatoes reports a 92% approval rating with an average rating of 7.70/10, based on 118 reviews. The site's critical consensus reads, "With a premiere drenched in the atmosphere and grit of film noir, Andor announces right out of the gate that is a bold departure from the attitude and style of previous Star Wars stories."

Writing for Collider, Maggie Lovitt gave the episode an "A+", calling it a "refreshing venture back to the early days of a rebellion" and comparing Andor's time on Morlana One as something out of Blade Runner. She highlights that the series wasted no time giving vital pieces of information about who the character is and what his story may look like after Rogue One and its tie-in novels and novelizations provided little about who Andor was other than him "being six years old when the Empire first impacted his life and a steadfast and morally dubious member of the rebellion". Vulture's Jesse Hassenger did not feel as positive about the episode, giving it 3 out of 5 stars.
