= Toby Haynes =

British television director (born 1977)

- Born: Toby Oliver Glyn Haynes; October 1977 (age 49)
- Occupation: Television director

Toby Oliver Glyn Haynes (born October 1977) is a British television director, notable for his work on Doctor Who (2010–11), Sherlock (2012), Black Mirror (2017–2025), and Andor (2022). He also directed the Channel 4/HBO television film Brexit: The Uncivil War.

He found interest in filmmaking after having watched Raiders Of The Lost Ark as a kid, naming it his favorite film.

He is a graduate of the National Film and Television School, and an alumnus of Falmouth University.

He won the Hugo Award for Best Dramatic Presentation (Short Form) for the Doctor Who episodes "The Pandorica Opens" and "The Big Bang" (2010).

== Filmography ==
Film

- Brexit: The Uncivil War (2019)

Television

Title	Episodes	Broadcaster
Coming Up	"The Baader Meinhoff Gang Show" (2004)	Channel 4
Hollyoaks	1 episode (2007)	Channel 4
M.I. High	"The Sinister Prime Minister" (2007); "Stars in Their Eyes" (2007); "The Big Freeze" (2007); "The Power Thief" (2007); "Nerd Alert" (2007); "It's a Kind of Magic" (2008); "You Can Call Me Al" (2008); "Evil by Design" (2008); "Fit Up" (2008); "Face Off" (2008)	CBBC
Holby Blue	Series 2, Episode 3 (2008); Series 2, Episode 4 (2008)	BBC One
Spooks: Code 9	"Deal" (2008); "National Catastrophe" (2008)	BBC Three
Being Human	Series 1, Episode 1 (2009); Series 1, Episode 2 (2009)	BBC Three
Five Days	"Day 1" (2010); "Day 2" (2010); "Day 8" (2010)	BBC One
Doctor Who	"The Pandorica Opens" / "The Big Bang" (2010); "A Christmas Carol" (2010); "The Impossible Astronaut" / "Day of the Moon" (2011)	BBC One
Sherlock	"The Reichenbach Fall" (2012)	BBC One
Wallander	"An Event in Autumn" (2012)	BBC One
The Musketeers	"Friends and Enemies" (2014); "Sleight of Hand" (2014)	BBC One
Jonathan Strange & Mr Norrell	"The Friends of English Magic" (2015); "How Is Lady Pole?" (2015); "The Education of a Magician" (2015); "All the Mirrors of the World" (2015); "Arabella" (2015); "The Black Tower" (2015); "Jonathan Strange & Mr Norrell" (2015)	BBC One
Black Mirror	"USS Callister" (2017); "Demon 79" (2023); "Bête Noire" (2025); "USS Callister: Into Infinity" (2025)	Netflix
Utopia	"Life Begins" (2020); "Just a Fanboy" (2020); "Tuesday's Child" (2020); "Stay Alive, Jessica Hyde" (2020)	Amazon Prime
Andor	"Kassa" (2022); "That Would Be Me" (2022); "Reckoning" (2022); "Narkina 5" (2022); "Nobody's Listening!" (2022); "One Way Out" (2022)	Disney+
