= Bix Caleen =

Fictional Star Wars character

- Star Wars character
- Adria Arjona as Bix Caleen
- First appearance: "Kassa"; Andor (2022)
- Last appearance: "Jedha, Kyber, Erso"; Andor (2025)
- Portrayed by: Adria Arjona

In-universe information
- Species: Human
- Gender: Female
- Significant other: Cassian Andor
- Homeworld: Ferrix

Bix Caleen is a fictional character in the Star Wars franchise portrayed by Adria Arjona. The character was first introduced as a supporting character in the television series Andor (2022-2025), the prequel to the feature film Rogue One (2016).

Working in salvage yard, Bix Caleen is a mechanic on the planet Ferrix. One day she is interrupted by her former lover, Cassian Andor, who asks for one of her contacts to sell an item.

The character received broadly positive reception from critics, with the attempted sexual assault of the character and her ending being controversial.

== Creation ==
Andor creator Tony Gilroy said about the attempted sexual assult scene that it was "organic and it felt right" due to powers in history committing rape. Adria Arjona stated about the scene "It’s not really important whether it was controversial or not,” she says. “If we’re showing all parts of history, then you’ve gotta show that part. Rape and abuse of power lives in our world and also lives in the galaxy far, far away. It’s sad, but it’s important". When acting in the scene Adria Arjona said it was "challenging because everyone involved in the creation of that scene felt the importance of what this scene meant" but also added that she "felt incredibly safe and cushioned in the process of doing it".

== Character ==
=== Andor ===
==== Season 1 ====
Bix is approached by her former lover Cassian Andor in her salvage yard. He wants to sell an Imperial Starpath unit to one of her contacts. Later that day, Bix contacts the buyer. Bix meets Andor once more at a bar. Andor reveals that he killed two Pre-Mor security officers. Timm Karlo, Bix's current lover, was watching them from a distance. He later contacts the Pre-Mor authorities about Andor. The day after, Bix meets her contact Luthen Rael. She informs him about Andor's situation before parting ways. After Bix returns to her salvage yard, she is informed that Andor's mother, Maarva Andor, had her house raided by the Pre-Mor. Knowing someone had betrayed Andor, she starts searching for him. In her search, she runs into a Pre-Mor team. She attempts to flee but fails and is handcuffed. Karlo soon arrives and questions what they had done to her. The Pre-Mor order him to stop moving. Karlo ignores the order and is shot in the chest, killing him. She is later rescued by the local Salman Paak and his son Wilmon Paak.

Bix meets Andor in her salvage yard once again. Bix tells him that he should not have returned. Andor asks what motivated Karlo to report him. Bix guesses he thought that she and Andor had gotten back together and felt jealous. Before leaving, Cassian leaves twelve thousand credits behind, which covered everything he owed to everyone on Ferrix.

After hearing banging from the streets, Bix goes out in the morning. Imperial Captain Vanis Tigo orders her to be arrested after spotting her in a crowd. She is taken to the hotel that had been converted into a garrison and is met by Imperial Security Bureau Supervisor Dedra Meero. Meero introduces Doctor Gorst, who tortures her to gain information about Andor and Rael. After resisting for some time, Bix eventually concedes and tells Meero all of the information she needs.

Exhausted and traumatised from the torture, Bix is imprisoned in the hotel. Due to the parade on Rix Road, not many troops are stationed at the hotel. This gives Andor a chance to rescue Bix. Andor and local Brasso help Bix get on a starship to get off Ferrix. Andor does not go with them on the ship, but Bix is sure he will find them.

==== Season 2 ====
Bix is now hiding with her friends on planet Mina-Rau while Andor is carrying out missions for Rael. They are not there legally, and get worried when an Imperial scan cruiser arrives to carry out a planetary audit. Bix is later approached by an Imperial Lieutenant named Krole. He begins to flirt with Bix. Bix tries to reject his advances by mentioning her lover, Cassian, whom she calls her husband. Krole is interrupted by Brasso.

The day after, the group plans to leave due to them being next on the Imperial audit schedule. While Bix and Brasso are packing up they notice that Paak has not returned. Brasso departs on a speeder to try to find Paak, which leaves Bix alone. Krole soon arrives to inspect them and enters their home. Krole confronts Bix and says that he knows she is illegal. Krole, alone with Bix, tries to sexually assault her. Bix fights back and is eventually able to hit Krole with a metal object which leads to his death. Outside the house, Corporal Pyke calls for backup as he sees Krole fall to the ground. Paak, now returning, distracts Pyke which gives Bix the chance to kill him. An Imperial TIE Avenger is shooting Imperial troops from above. Bix is sure that Andor is the pilot. They are able to meet up with Andor and escape the planet with Brasso not surviving.

Bix and Andor now live in an apartment on Coruscant. She struggles with nightmares inflicted by Doctor Gorst's torture. After Andor left for a mission on Ghorman, Bix uses a liquid sedative drug to cope with the traumatic torture. While Andor is still on his mission, Rael visits Bix. Bix is first concerned due to believing he has come to deliver the news of Andor's death, but Rael calms her. Rael notices that she's been taking the sedative drug and warns her of its long-term effects. Andor and Bix later carry out a mission to kill Gorst and destroy his technology. On this mission, Bix subjects Gorst to the same torture she endured. After exiting the building, they activate explosives they placed there.

Bix and Andor have now moved to Yavin 4. There they meet a force healer. The healer tells Bix, this is where Andor needs to be. After a night, Andor wakes up in his hut on Yavin 4 alone. He watches a video on a datapad Bix had recorded the day prior. She explains to him that it is best she leaves to not distract him from the rebellion and that they will reunite once more when the time comes.

In the last scene of the entire series, Bix is shown carrying her baby on Mina-Rau.

== Reception ==
Bix Caleen received broadly positive reception from critics with some controversial moments. Lucas Kloberdanz-Dyck of Collider said her resilance made her "one of the most beloved characters in Star Wars". Tasha Robinson of Polygon said she was "not a fan of that ending" and that "it plays into another huge cliché for female characters in media" while also praising the show for not "fridging" the character.

Youtuber Star Wars Theory made statements online about the attempted sexual assult scene in episode "Harvest", saying that "it has no place in Star Wars" and that Darth Vader would not tolerate it.
