= Messenger (Andor) =

- Andor episode
- The Ghorman Front debate on how to combat the Empire.
- Episode no.: Season 2 Episode 7
- Directed by: Janus Metz
- Written by: Dan Gilroy
- Cinematography by: Mark Patten
- Editing by: Yan Miles
- Original release date: May 6, 2025
- Running time: 44 minutes

Guest appearances
- Anton Lesser as Major Partagaz; Kurt Egyiawan as Attendant Grymish; Jonjo O'Neill as Captain Kaido; Thierry Godard as Lezine; Richard Sammel as Carro Rylanz; Pierro Niel-Mee as Erskin Semaj; Alistair Petrie as General Davits Draven

Episode chronology
| ← Previous "What a Festive Evening" | Next → "Who Are You?" |

"Messenger" is the seventh episode of the second season of the American science fiction political spy thriller drama television series Andor. It is the nineteenth episode of the series overall; it was written by Dan Gilroy and directed by Janus Metz.

The episode is set in BBY 2, (Note: 2 years before the Battle of Yavin, i.e., the climax of Stars Wars (1977)) a year after the events of the previous episode.

"Messenger" was released on Disney+ on May 6, 2025, as part of a three-episode block also including "Who Are You?" and "Welcome to the Rebellion", and received positive reviews from critics.

== Plot ==
In 2BBY, Wilmon Paak returns to the rebel base Yavin IV and greets Cassian Andor and Bix Caleen. He attempts to recruit Cassian on a rebel mission to assassinate Dedra Meero on Ghorman, where he was positioned by Luthen Rael. Cassian is reluctant due to Rael's involvement, having lost trust in him, despite Dedra's involvement in Ferrix's destruction and the death of Wilmon's father.

Later, Bix Caleen is intrigued by a supposed Force healer on the rebel base, despite Cassian's cynicism and disbelief in the Force's existence, she brings him to see the healer to treat a blaster wound on his shoulder which has not healed. The healer seems to sense Cassian and treats his wound, privately telling Bix that she feels a great burden on him, and that he will be a messenger. Cassian discovers his wound has improved, and though he is upset when Bix informs him of the healer's message, he is moved to join Wilmon. General Davits Draven warns Cassian about his unauthorized trips. Vel Sartha, prompted by Draven, visits Bix after Cassian has left. She confides in Bix about her dealings with grief and feeling of freedom without Rael, as well as emphasizing Cassian's importance to the rebellion.

Mon Mothma and her aide, Erskin Semaj, meet with Ghorman senator Oran, who thanks Mothma for her support of his planet, but confides that Imperial presence is too strong and the situation too dangerous. Dedra Meero discusses with Lio Partagaz the increased stability of the Ghorman Front, but he orders her to continue with the intended plan, as the Empire has decided to move forward with the extraction of Ghorman's resources in the following days. (Note: As discussed in "One Year Later".) Imperial Captain Kaido is stationed on Ghorman to implement the Imperial takeover of the planet. Syril Karn is prevented from meeting Meero, but later talks to her privately and denies the accusations of outside agitators, which she claims Kaido is there to investigate. He demands to know the truth, but she instead kisses him and leaves.

Ghorman Front leader Carro Rylanz wishes to continue the groups peaceful approach to resistance, whilst other members—led by his daughter Enza—wish to make a public stand. They are calmed by Lezine, who reminds them of their identity as the Ghor. Karn later approaches Enza at night and tells her Imperials believe outside agitators are involved. She slaps him for his betrayal of the rebellion and leaves. Cassian and Wilmon arrive on Ghorman where they split up for protection. Cassian checks into the same hotel as the previous year, where the porter, Thela, recognizes him but does not expose his deception. Wilmon returns to the Ghorman Front, with whom he has become insulated, and reunites with his girlfriend Dreena. Andor uses a scope mount to watch Meero in her office through his hotel window.

== Production ==
=== Writing ===
The episode was written by Dan Gilroy, in his fourth writing credit for the show, and directed by Janus Metz, prior to directing the following two episodes of the series. The episodes of Andor's second season, like those of its first, are split up into blocks, or story arcs, of three episodes; however, unlike in season one, each arc begins with a time skip of one year from the previous episode. Series showrunner Tony Gilroy decided to structure the season this way after concluding that the original five-season plan for the show was unfeasible, and needing some way to bridge the four years between season 1 and Rogue One (2016) in a single season. As proof of concept, he wrote the first and last episodes of each would-be arc, and eventually decided on this structure for the season.

=== Music ===
The original score for "Messenger", as with nine other episodes of the season's twelve, (Note: All episodes of season 2 but "Ever Been to Ghorman?" and "I Have Friends Everywhere" credit Roberts as the main composer) was composed by Brandon Roberts, replacing Nicholas Britell, the composer for the show's first season, due to scheduling conflicts.

The soundtrack for the episode was released alongside that of the other two episodes in its block on May 9, 2025, via Walt Disney Records as part of the third of four volumes of the second season's original score.

Andor Season 2: Episode 7 (Original Soundtrack)
| No. | Title | Length |
|---|---|---|
| 1. | "Andor (Main Title Theme) – Episode 7" | 0:41 |
| 2. | "Yavin" | 1:28 |
| 3. | "We Are the Ghor" | 1:04 |
| 4. | "The Force Healer" | 2:15 |
| 5. | "Messenger" | 1:50 |
| 6. | "He'll Be There When You Need Him" | 2:32 |
| 7. | "Sniper" | 2:33 |
| 8. | "I Knew – Ghorman Aria (Note: Performed by Ann de Renais; the track also plays in the background of Dedra's apartment in "Sagrona Teema")" | 2:11 |
| Total length: | | 14:34 |

== Release ==
"Messenger" was released on Disney+ on May 6, 2025, as part of a three-episode block, alongside "Who Are You?" and "Welcome to the Rebellion".

== Reception ==
=== Critical response ===
The review aggregator website Rotten Tomatoes reports an 88% approval rating, based on 8 reviews.

William Hughes of The A.V. Club gave a positive review, writing "Diego Luna doesn't get to have a ton of fun this episode, but Cassian clearly gets a kick out of screwing with Wilmon, big brother-style, when they leave for Ghorman." Mike Redmond of Pajiba gave a negative review, summarizing that "I'm going to put my cards on the table here: I am confounded by the creative choices made in this latest chapter, possibly even infuriated." Redmond's criticism stemmed from misinterpreting the episode's discussions as indicating Force sensitivity in the protagonist.
