= Welcome to the Rebellion =

- Andor episode
- Cassian Andor (Diego Luna) and Mon Mothma (Genevieve O'Reilly) escape the Senate together following Mon's anti-Imperial speech, in the first meeting between the two characters.
- Episode no.: Season 2 Episode 9
- Directed by: Janus Metz
- Written by: Dan Gilroy
- Cinematography by: Mark Patten
- Editing by: Yan Miles
- Original release date: May 6, 2025
- Running time: 58 minutes

Guest appearances
- Benjamin Bratt as Bail Organa; Michael Jenn as Supervisor Lagret; Akshay Khanna as Selko; Duncan Pow as Ruescott Melshi; Pierro Niel-Mee as Erskin Semaj; Ella Pellegrini as Dreena; Alistair Petrie as General Davits Draven; Alan Tudyk as K-2SO

Episode chronology
← Previous "Who Are You?"	Next → "Make It Stop"

"Welcome to the Rebellion" is the ninth episode of the second season of the American science fiction political spy thriller drama television series Andor. It is the twenty-first episode of the series overall, and was written by Dan Gilroy and directed by Janus Metz.

"Welcome to the Rebellion" was released on Disney+ on May 6, 2025 as part of a three-episode block also including "Messenger" and "Who Are You?", and received widespread critical acclaim for its writing, emotional weight, and the performance of Genevieve O'Reilly. Dan Gilroy won the Primetime Emmy Award for Outstanding Writing for a Drama Series for writing the episode.

== Plot ==
Senator Bail Organa sees Ghorman senator Dasi Oran arrested as the Empire frames the Ghorman Massacre (Note: As depicted in "Who Are You?") as an insurrection. He and Mon Mothma converse secretly, with the latter insisting they publicly condemn these actions. Organa chooses to stay behind to aid the Rebellion in secret, but urges Mothma to continue with her plans and relocate to Yavin IV. He prepares a team to safely extract her, while Kleya Marki and Luthen Rael call in Cassian Andor for the same purpose.

Mothma, with the help of her aide Erskin Semaj, destroys a listening device in her office. Rael intercepts Mothma outside, revealing Semaj to be his agent. Mothma refuses to trust Rael due to his constant secrets, despite his insistence that Organa's extraction team is compromised. A distraught Mothma confronts and fires Semaj. The following day, Andor, Rael, and Kleya meet to discuss the plan. Andor successfully infiltrates the Senate building under the alias 'Ronni Googe', a reporter. Semaj also enters, and the pair identify each other with a code phrase. A worried Mothma questions Organa about his extraction team, and he admits to not knowing them personally.

In the senate, the Senators continue to speak of the Ghorman Massacre as an unjustifiable attack by the Ghor, focusing on the deaths of Imperial soldiers and tourists from their worlds. Organa uses a technicality in Senate procedure to pass the floor to Mothma, allowing her to deliver a speech. Mothma condemns the treatment of the Ghorman people and the false portrayal of the massacre by other senators, describing it as 'unprovoked genocide' and naming Emperor Palpatine as culpable. Imperial officers attempt to shut down the broadcast, but are hindered by obstacles from Senate staff sympathetic to the rebellion. Organa's team prepares to extract Mothma, but Imperial mole Beska alerts her superiors and kills a member of the extraction team who discovers her.

Andor approaches Mothma, revealing himself as Rael's agent. He wins her trust by describing his own feelings about Rael, and his history with her cousin, Vel. The pair are swarmed by journalists and Organa's team reaches them, but Beska produces a blaster and attempts to arrest Mothma. Semaj distracts her, enabling Andor to kill her with his own concealed blaster. Andor escapes with Mothma while Semaj uses Beska's blaster to prevent the journalists and Bail's team from following. Andor and Mothma run through the senate avoiding the crowds, and they are approached by her driver and Imperial spy Kloris. Andor pretends to have captured Mothma before killing Kloris and escaping in Mothma's vehicle. Andor, Mothma, and Semaj reconvene in the Coruscant safe house, where the latter two reconcile. Andor reunites with Wilmon Paak and his Ghorman girlfriend Dreena, who have evacuated from Ghorman, although Wilmon is seriously wounded. Kleya greets them and prepares to have Mothma and Semaj be collected by Gold Squadron (Note: As depicted in the Star Wars Rebels episode "Secret Cargo" (2017)) whilst the other three head to Yavin.

On Yavin IV, Andor gives the rebels his stolen KX unit (Note: K-2SO, acquired in "Who Are You?") and reunites with Bix Caleen. Andor informs her of his intentions to leave the rebellion to live a proper life with her. Initially reluctant, she agrees. The next morning, Andor awakens to find her gone and a video message iterating her belief that the rebellion is too important for her to hold him back. A distraught Andor heads to where the reprogrammed KX unit is being rebooted and arms himself with a blaster with the other rebels. To his surprise, the unit awakens and politely greets the crowd.

== Production ==
=== Writing ===
The episode was written by Dan Gilroy, in his sixth writing credit for the show, and directed by Janus Metz, after directing the previous two episodes of the series. The episodes of Andor's second season, like those of its first, are split up into blocks, or story arcs, of three episodes; however, unlike in season one, each arc begins with a time skip of one year from the previous episode. Series showrunner Tony Gilroy decided to structure the season this way after concluding that the original five-season plan for the show was unfeasible, and needing some way to bridge the four years between the first season and Rogue One (2016) in a single season. As proof of concept, he wrote the first and last episodes of each would-be arc, and eventually decided on this structure for the season.

In May 2022, Gilroy said Cassian Andor would meet Rebel leader Mon Mothma in the second season after the pair had separate stories in the first. The two lead characters finally meet in "Welcome to the Rebellion", with Cassian convincing an endangered Mon that he is her best chance of escaping the Senate building. William Hughes of The A.V. Club noted, "Andor likes to play a very long game with keeping its main characters disconnected from each other, and ... there’s a base-level charge to seeing O’Reilly and Luna getting to share a scene together that elevates the entire sequence".

For K-2SO's introduction in the episode, Gilroy originally wrote an entirely self-contained story for the season's ninth episode that played like a horror film, with a KX unit hunting over a huge tanker ship on Yavin IV with K-2SO involved in the scenario, but budget issues meant the show's crew couldn't afford its production and consolidated things instead, so they opted to move up Mothma's Senate speech to "Welcome to the Rebellion", as it had been originally slated to occur in "Make It Stop". In retrospect, Gilroy was glad to scrap that story, as the need to extent existing set usage to save money meant more screen time and effort was given to the Mothma's escape from the Galactic Senate. Genevieve O'Reilly, who played Mothma, provided Gilroy with input when writing her speech denouncing the Galactic Empire's role in the Ghorman Massacre in "Welcome to the Rebellion". While Gilroy had initially only written sections of the monologue which were to be spliced into a bigger montage, O'Reilly convinced him to write an entire speech. Gilroy drew inspiration from historic speeches made by Abraham Lincoln, John F. Kennedy, Winston Churchill, Martin Luther King Jr. and Mahatma Gandhi. He subsequently compared the speech to "accusing Hitler of genocide in the Reichstag".

Mothma giving a speech denouncing the Ghorman Massacre was previously depicted in the Star Wars Rebels (2014-2018) episode "Secret Cargo". When writing the episode, Dan Gilroy expressed frustration with having to work with the canonicity of Rebels, remarking, "Do I have to stick to this fucking speech?" The events of Rebels were eventually referenced in the final product, with dialogue in the episode indicating that Mothma would be handed over to the Gold Squadron of the Rebel Alliance, as depicted in "Secret Cargo". In line with this, Mothma was originally going to go back with Andor to Chandrila to explain to Perrin and Leida why she was doing what she was doing and Andor would have handed her over to the Gold Squadron then and there. The writers contemplated having Mothma's last scene with Perrin reveal that Perrin had been interrogated by the ISB weekly behind his wife's back all those years yet he had kept his mouth shut, all to protect her behind her back, a discovery that would have shocked Mothma and left her heartbroken for her actions at Coruscant because she would have realized that her husband had really cared about her after all and that she could have had an ally in him all along.

=== Casting ===
By March 2023, Benjamin Bratt had been cast for the episode in an undisclosed role, later revealed to be Bail Organa, replacing Jimmy Smits in the role. Early in the season's development, Gilroy had some conversations with Kathleen Kennedy and Pablo Hidalgo about having Bail's adoptive daughter Princess Leia, one of the Star Wars original trilogy's main characters, make an appearance as a newly sworn senator during Investiture Week on Coruscant. Gilroy admits to trying to get "the most" out of the week of political networking and high society pageantry, considering a scene between Leia and Mothma, both sixteen and newly appointed senators, but the idea never gained traction and never even went to the casting stage, as it became a distraction from the story.

=== Filming ===
In March 2023, director Janus Metz filmed the episode in Xàtiva and Valencia. According to O'Reilly, filming also occurred in May 2023.

=== Music ===
The original score for "Welcome to the Rebellion", as with nine other episodes of the season's twelve, (Note: All episodes of season 2 but "Ever Been to Ghorman?" and "I Have Friends Everywhere" credit Roberts as the main composer) was composed by Brandon Roberts, replacing Nicholas Britell, the composer for the show's first season, due to scheduling conflicts.

The soundtrack for the episode was released alongside that of the other two episodes in its block on May 9, 2025 via Walt Disney Records as part of the third of four volumes of the second season's original score.

Andor Season 2: Episode 9 (Original Soundtrack)
No.	Title	Length
1.	"Andor (Main Title Theme) – Episode 9 (Note: Performed by Roberts and Britell, the track is an altered mix of the theme for "The Axe Forgets", with chanting of the Ghor planetary anthem played over it)"	0:43
2.	"Bug"	1:46
3.	"Next Year, in Yavin"	1:07
4.	"Article 17-252"	3:50
5.	"I Have Friends Everywhere"	2:06
6.	"Welcome to the Rebellion"	3:32
7.	"Bix's Message"	3:01
8.	"Senate Escape Suite"	3:25
Total length:		19:30

== Release ==
"Welcome to the Rebellion" was released on Disney+ on May 6, 2025 as part of a three-episode block, alongside "Who Are You?" and "Messenger".

== Reception ==
=== Critical response ===
The review aggregator website Rotten Tomatoes reports a 100% approval rating, based on 10 reviews.

William Hughes of The A.V. Club gave a positive review, writing "Andor reminds us how much fun it can have when it's locked into pure spy mode ... this is the stuff Andor most frequently excels at: moving parts and rising tension, moment-to-moment improvisations and whispered plans." Mike Redmond of Pajiba also gave a positive review, summarizing that "I know I was really hard on this arc, but to its credit, it was a breezy watch unlike last week. Episode 9 was particularly great, and I did not feel chained to my couch".

=== Mon Mothma's speech ===
Parallels have been drawn between the speech given by Mon Mothma and 2025 events, including the Gaza War and second presidency of Donald Trump, with particular emphasis on the speech's use of the word "genocide". The speech was characterized as an "anti-fascism speech" by TheWrap and /Film.

Roxana Hadadi in Variety wrote that "As in our world, Mon’s use of the term “genocide” draws outrage, but Andor has so often positioned the Chandrilan leader as the Rebellion’s most reasonable voice that we can accept what she says here as the truth." Walter Marsh in The Guardian wrote that "by calling a genocide a genocide, Andor just made its most political point yet", adding that "From its post-truth themes to the contentious debate over the definition of “genocide”, the speech’s parallels to current events – from Trump’s America to Gaza – have been noted by many viewers." On November 12, 2025 in a Harvard Political Review piece titled "Is Andor a Parable for Our Politics?", Aidan Zagel cited the speech's excerpt "the death of truth is the ultimate victory of evil. When truth leaves us, when we let it slip away, when it is ripped from our hands, we become vulnerable to the appetite of whatever monster screams the loudest," writing that "[Mon Mothma's] words cut to the heart of authoritarianism because authoritarianism sets in as a silent erosion of truth, justice, and free will."

Tony Gilroy, in response to a question if the speech were about current events, said "The really sorry truth about the about this question — and we get it a lot — is that peace and prosperity and calm are the rarities. Those are rarities throughout the last 6,000 years of recorded history. You could drop this show at any point in the last 6,000 years, and it would make sense to some people about what’s happening to them."

Quotes from the speech, including "The death of truth is the ultimate victory of evil", were featured on signs at No Kings protests in the United States in 2025.

=== Accolades ===
Award	Year	Category	Recipient(s)	Result	Ref.
FilmLight Colour Awards	2025	TV Series / Episodic	Jean-Clement Soret at Company 3	Nominated (Note: Shared with "Ever Been to Ghorman?" and "Jedha, Kyber, Erso")	
Primetime Emmy Awards	2025	Outstanding Writing for a Drama Series	Dan Gilroy	Won	
Visual Effects Society Awards	2026	Outstanding Environment in an Episodic, Commercial, Game Cinematic, or Real-Time Project	John O'Connell, Falk Boje, Hasan Ilhan, and Kevin George (for "The Senate District")	Won	
