= British Academy Television Craft Award for Best Director: Fiction =

Award for technical achievements in TV

British Academy Television Craft Award
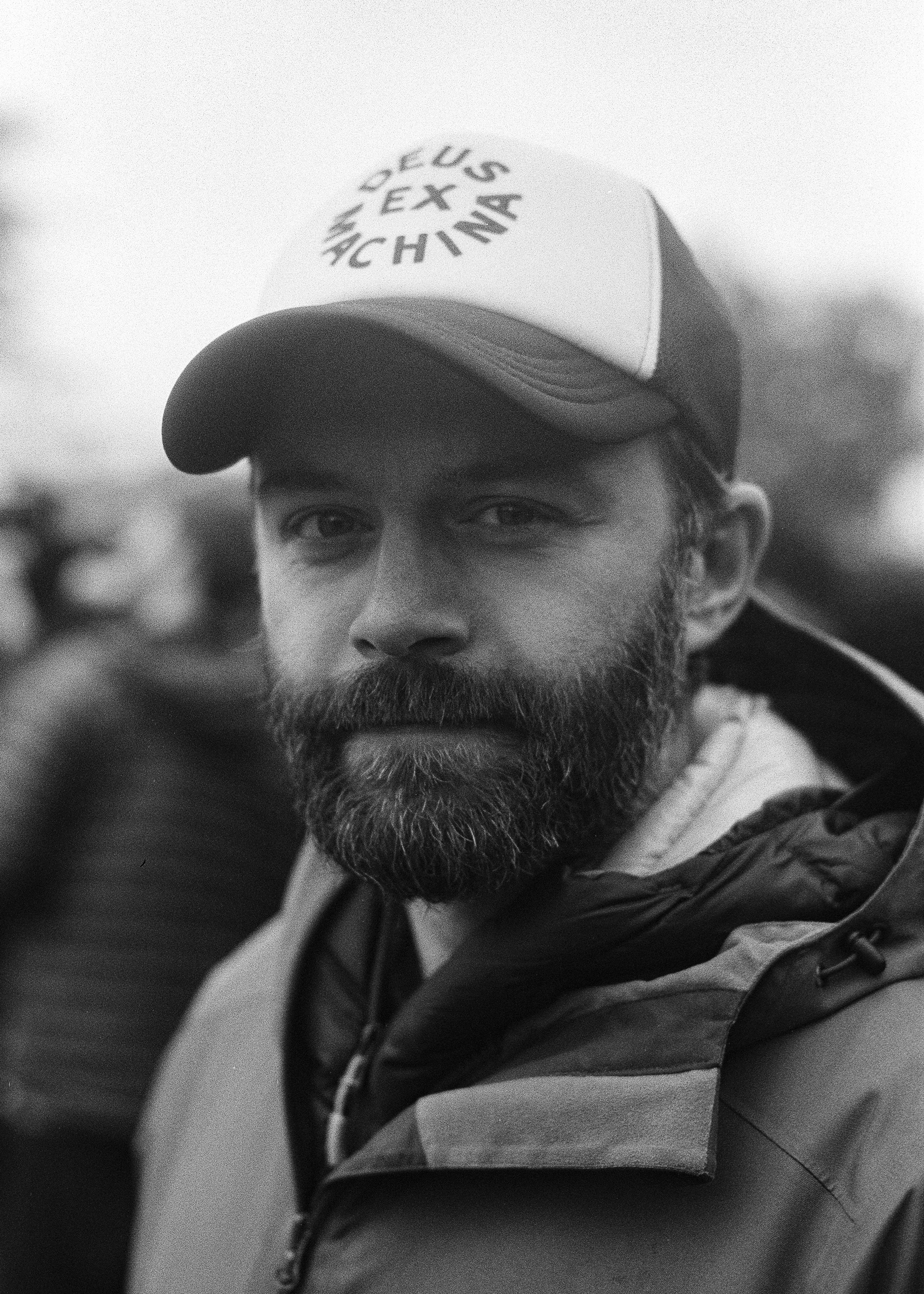
- 2026 Recipient: Philip Barantini
- Country: United Kingdom
- Presented by: British Academy of Film and Television Arts
- First award: 2008
- Currently held by: Philip Barantini for Adolescence (2026)
- Website: http://www.bafta.org/

The British Academy Television Craft Award for Best Director: Fiction is one of the categories presented by the British Academy of Film and Television Arts (BAFTA) within the British Academy Television Craft Awards, the craft awards were established in 2000 with their own, separate ceremony as a way to spotlight technical achievements, without being overshadowed by the main production categories.

In 2006 and 2007 there was only on category for directors but in 2008 the category was split in three separate categories to recognize directing for different programming, first creating Best Director: Factual and Best Director: Fiction and then in 2011 Best Director: Multi-Camera.

== Winners and nominees ==
=== 2000s ===
Best Director

Year	Recipient(s)	Title	Broadcaster
2006	Brian Percival	Much Ado About Nothing	BBC One
2006	Simon Cellan Jones	The Queen's Sister	Channel 4
2006	Joe Ahearne	Doctor Who	BBC One
2006	Justin Chadwick	Bleak House	BBC One
2007	Edmund Coulthard	Soundproof	BBC Two
2007	Tom Hooper	Longford	Channel 4
2007	Adrian Shergold	Low Winter Sun	Channel 4
2007	Bharat Nalluri	Life on Mars	BBC One

Best Director: Fiction

Year	Recipient(s)	Title	Broadcaster
2008	John Crowley	Boy A	Channel 4
2008	Otto Bathurst	Five Days	BBC One
2008	Marc Munden	The Mark of Cain	Channel 4
2008	Adrian Shergold	Persuasion	ITV
2009	Rowan Joffé	The Shooting of Thomas Hurndall	Channel 4
2009	Otto Bathurst	Criminal Justice	BBC One
2009	Alex Holmes	House of Saddam	BBC Two
2009	Niall MacCormick	Margaret Thatcher: The Long Walk to Finchley	BBC Four

=== 2010s ===
Year	Recipient(s)	Title	Episode	Broadcaster
2010	Philip Martin	Mo		Channel 4
2010	Yann Demange	Criminal Justice		BBC One
2010	Aisling Walsh	Wallander	"The Fifth Woman"	BBC One
2010	James Hawes	Enid		BBC Four
2011	Brian Percival	Downton Abbey		ITV1
2011	Paul McGuigan	Sherlock	"A Study in Pink"	BBC One
2011	Shane Meadows	This Is England '86		Channel 4
2011	Charles Sturridge	The Road to Coronation Street		BBC Four
2012	Hugo Blick	The Shadow Line		BBC Two
2012	Julian Jarrold	Appropriate Adult		ITV
2012	John Alexander	Exile		BBC One
2012	Yann Demange	Top Boy		Channel 4
2013	Philippa Lowthorpe	Call the Midwife		BBC One
2013	Julian Jarrold	The Girl		BBC Two
2013	Birger Larsen	Murder		BBC Two
2013	Hettie Macdonald	Hit & Miss		Sky Atlantic
2014	Otto Bathurst	Peaky Blinders		BBC One
2014	James Strong	Broadchurch	"Episode One"	ITV
2014	Jane Campion, Garth Davis	Top of the Lake		BBC Two
2014	Marc Munden	Utopia		Channel 4
2015	Julian Farino	Marvellous		BBC Two
2015	Euros Lyn	Happy Valley		BBC One
2015	Hugo Blick	The Honourable Woman		BBC Two
2015	Paul Andrew Williams	Murdered by My Boyfriend		BBC Three
2016	Shane Meadows	This Is England '90		Channel 4
2016	Aisling Walsh	An Inspector Calls		BBC One
2016	Ben Taylor	Catastrophe		Channel 4
2016	Jakob Verbruggen	London Spy		BBC Two
2017	Marc Munden	National Treasure		Channel 4
2017	Euros Lyn	Damilola, Our Loved Boy		BBC One
2017	Susanne Bier	The Night Manager		BBC One
2017	Stephen Daldry	The Crown		Netflix
2018	Philippa Lowthorpe	Three Girls		BBC One
2018	Jane Campion	Top of the Lake: China Girl		BBC Two
2018	Mackenzie Crook	Detectorists		BBC Four
2018	Paul Whittington	Little Boy Blue		ITV
2019	Stephen Frears	A Very English Scandal		BBC One
2019	Harry Bradbeer	Killing Eve	"Nice Face"	BBC One
2019	Mahalia Belo	The Long Song		BBC One
2019	Thomas Vincent	Bodyguard	"Episode 1"	BBC One

=== 2020s ===
Year	Recipient(s)	Title	Episode	Broadcaster
2020	Johan Renck	Chernobyl		Sky Atlantic
2020	Harry Bradbeer	Fleabag		BBC Three
2020	Toby Haynes	Brexit: The Uncivil War		Channel 4
2020	Shane Meadows	The Virtues		Channel 4
2021	Michaela Coel and Sam Miller	I May Destroy You		BBC One
2021	Lenny Abrahamson	Normal People		BBC Three
2021	Steve McQueen	Small Axe		BBC One
2021	Benjamin Caron	The Crown	"Fairytale"	Netflix
2022	Peter Hoar	It's a Sin		Channel 4
2022	Lewis Arnold	Time		BBC One
2022	Marc Munden	Help		Channel 4
2022	Will Sharpe	Landscapers		Sky Atlantic
2023	William Stefan Smith	Top Boy		Netflix
2023	Dearbhla Walsh	Bad Sisters		Apple TV+
2023	Hugo Blick	The English		BBC Two
2023	Lucy Forbes	This Is Going to Hurt		BBC One
2024	Peter Hoar	The Last of Us		HBO / Sky Atlantic
2024	Lewis Arnold	The Long Shadow	"Episode 6"	ITV
2024	William Stefan Smith	Top Boy	"If We Are Not Monsters"	Netflix
2024	Joseph Bullman	Partygate		Channel 4
2025	Weronika Tofilska	Baby Reindeer		Netflix
2025	Nida Manzoor	We Are Lady Parts		Channel 4
2025	Molly Manners	One Day		Netflix
2025	Peter Kosminsky	Wolf Hall: The Mirror and the Light		BBC One
2026	Philip Barantini	Adolescence		Netflix
2026	Janus Metz	Andor	"Messenger", "Who Are You?" & "Welcome to the Rebellion"	Disney+
2026	Sam Donovan	Severance	"Goodbye, Mrs. Selvig" & "Trojan's Horse"	Apple TV
2026	Dawn Shadforth	Trespasses		Channel 4

== See also ==
- Primetime Emmy Award for Outstanding Directing for a Comedy Series
- Primetime Emmy Award for Outstanding Directing for a Drama Series
- Primetime Emmy Award for Outstanding Directing for a Limited Series, Movie, or Dramatic Special
