= Who Are You? (Andor) =

- Andor episode
- Syril Karn (Kyle Soller) hesitates after Cassian Andor (Diego Luna) asks him who he is.
- Episode no.: Season 2 Episode 8
- Directed by: Janus Metz
- Written by: Dan Gilroy
- Cinematography by: Mark Patten
- Editing by: Yan Miles
- Original release date: May 6, 2025
- Running time: 44 minutes

Guest appearances
- Jonjo O'Neill as Captain Kaido; Kathryn Hunter as Eedy Karn; Richard Sammel as Carro Rylanz; Thierry Godard as Lezine; Kurt Egyiawan as Attendant Grymish; Alaïs Lawson as Enza Rylanz; Ella Pellegrini as Dreena; Ewens Abid as Tazi; Abraham Wapler as Samm; Caroline Vanier as Leeza; Théo Costa-Marini as Dilan; Alex Skarbek as Capso

Episode chronology
| ← Previous "Messenger" | Next → "Welcome to the Rebellion" |

"Who Are You?" is the eighth episode of the second season of the American science fiction political spy thriller drama television series Andor. It is the twentieth episode of the series overall, and was written by Dan Gilroy and directed by Janus Metz.

The episode centers on the Ghorman Massacre. It marks the final appearance of nearly every Ghorman character thus introduced, including Carro Rylanz (played by Richard Sammel) and Lezine (played by Thierry Godard), as well as the planet Ghorman itself. "Who Are You?" also depicts the death and final appearance of Syril Karn (Kyle Soller).

"Who Are You?" was released on Disney+ on May 6, 2025, as part of a three-episode block also including "Messenger" and "Welcome to the Rebellion", and received widespread acclaim from critics for its writing, emotional weight, musical score and performances, particularly those of Denise Gough, Diego Luna and Soller. The episode received seven nominations at the 77th Primetime Emmy Awards, including Outstanding Directing for a Drama Series for Metz, winning two.

== Plot ==
On Ghorman, Imperial troops begin assembling a blockade in Palmo Plaza in anticipation of an upcoming protest by Ghorman citizens. Dedra Meero asks Partagaz how they plan to spin reports of Imperial mining rigs landing on Ghorman, but Partagaz tells her to focus on furthering the Empire's narrative of stifling Ghorman aggression. As the Ghorman Front arm themselves for the protest, news reports begin to spread of a planned general strike on Ghorman in response to the firebombing of an Imperial naval terminal on the planet, which led to several Imperial casualties. Syril Karn and other Imperial officers are summoned to the office complex in Palmo.

As the city's population makes its way to Palmo Plaza for the protest, Carro notices the Empire's barricades and realizes they are setting a trap for the protestors; he tries talking Enza out of continuing the protest, but she refuses, arguing that the Ghormans have remained silent for too long. Carro unsuccessfully attempts to warn other civilians away from the protest. When he notices Syril in the crowd, he berates him for his deception, demanding to know why the Empire is sending mining equipment to the planet; Syril insists it is just a rumor. Cassian spots Dedra (Note: Who he was sent to Ghorman to assassinate in "Messenger".) on the balcony of the Imperial headquarters.

The Ghorman population assembles on Palmo Plaza chanting protests against the Empire; Lezine leads the crowd in singing the Ghorman national anthem, while the rebels pass various weapons to each other. Kaido has his men close the exits and orders Stormtroopers sent into the square, trapping the crowd, and sends in a detachment of inexperienced riot police to the front lines of the protest. Syril, meanwhile, forces his way into the Imperial headquarters and confronts Dedra about the Empire's true agenda on Ghorman, choking her until she admits that the Empire is planning to mine the planet's resources for their energy program. She promises Syril that the two of them will be welcomed back as heroes for their work, but a disillusioned Syril leaves.

Outside, the standoff between the protestors and riot police continues, and Dedra allows Kaido to proceed with his plan. Kaido gives the order for a sniper to shoot one of the Empire's own riot police, and a shootout ensues between the Ghormans and Imperial forces. Numerous civilians and Ghorman Front members die while Cassian and Wilmon join the fight. Cassian attempts to assassinate Dedra, but the chaos prevents him from getting a clear shot. Kaido orders KX security droids to be sent in to suppress the protest, one of which kills Enza.

Syril watches the chaos in horror, until he spots Cassian preparing to shoot Dedra. Syril attacks Cassian in a rage, and the two engage in a brutal hand-to-hand fight, culminating in Syril cornering Cassian with a blaster. Cassian asks who he is, causing Syril to hesitate before being shot dead by Carro. Cassian and Wilmon join the crowd of civilians fleeing from the plaza as the KX droids chase after them and kill numerous people. Cassian unsuccessfully shoots one of the droids as it advances upon him, but Samm rams the droid into a wall with a transport vehicle, disabling it.

Wilmon stays behind to find his girlfriend Dreena, a member of the Ghorman Front, and urges Cassian to spread word of the Empire's massacre of the civilians. Cassian arranges for the damaged KX droid to be brought back with him. Wilmon finds Dreena at the Ghorman Front's headquarters making an emergency broadcast, reporting that many Ghormans have been killed in the massacre. Dedra has a panic attack in her office. Imperial newscasts portray the massacre as a terrorist attack by outside agitators. A grief-stricken Eedy watches the news from Coruscant, knowing that Syril is dead.

== Production ==
=== Writing ===
The episode was written by Dan Gilroy, in his fifth writing credit for the show, and directed by Janus Metz, after directing the previous episode of the series. The episodes of Andor's second season, like those of its first, are split up into blocks, or story arcs, of three episodes; however, unlike in season one, each arc begins with a time skip of one year from the previous episode. Series showrunner Tony Gilroy decided to structure the season this way after concluding that the original five-season plan for the show was unfeasible, and needing some way to bridge the four years between season one and Rogue One (2016) in a single season. As proof of concept, he wrote the first and last episodes of each would-be arc, and eventually decided on this structure for the season. Looking back in regards to his original plans for introducing K-2SO into the show, Gilroy was glad to have scrapped his original plot for a horror film-esque episode starring him, as the need to extend set usage to save money meant more screen time and effort was given to the Ghorman Massacre.

=== Music ===
The original score for "Who Are You?", as with nine other episodes of the season's twelve, (Note: All episodes of season 2 but "Ever Been to Ghorman?" and "I Have Friends Everywhere" credit Roberts as the main composer) was composed by Brandon Roberts, replacing Nicholas Britell, the composer for the show's first season, due to scheduling conflicts.

The soundtrack for the episode was released alongside that of the other two episodes in its block on May 9, 2025, via Walt Disney Records as part of the third of four volumes of the second season's original score. Roberts' score for "Who Are You?" was nominated for Outstanding Music Composition for a Series (Original Dramatic Score) at the 77th Primetime Creative Arts Emmy Awards.

Andor Season 2: Episode 8 (Original Soundtrack)
| No. | Title | Length |
|---|---|---|
| 1. | "Andor (Main Title Theme) – Episode 8 (Note: Performed by Grace Davidson)" | 0:47 |
| 2. | "The Plaza Fills" | 4:04 |
| 3. | "The Galaxy Is Watching" | 3:32 |
| 4. | "Good Luck Dedra" | 1:22 |
| 5. | "Fire at Will" | 4:02 |
| 6. | "Put Them Out There" | 2:44 |
| 7. | "Who Are You?" | 1:02 |
| 8. | "Palmo One" | 4:46 |
| 9. | "We Are the Ghor (Planetary Anthem: Orchestral Version) (Note: Performed by Davidson with lyrics by Nicholas Britell and Tony Gilroy)" | 2:29 |
| 10. | "Elegy for Ghorman" | 3:36 |
| 11. | "We Are the Ghor (Planetary Anthem: Acapella Version) (Note: Performed by Davidson)" | 1:41 |
| Total length: | | 30:06 |

== Release ==
"Who Are You?" was released on Disney+ on May 6, 2025, as part of a three-episode block, alongside "Messenger" and "Welcome to the Rebellion".

== Reception ==
=== Critical response ===
The review aggregator website Rotten Tomatoes reports an 88% approval rating, based on 8 reviews.

William Hughes of The A.V. Club gave a positive review, writing, "One of the finest episodes this finest of Star Wars shows has ever offered up." Mike Redmond of Pajiba gave a negative review, summarizing that "the flight path was already wobbly because of the rushed release schedule, and yet, that can't be blamed for what happened in this latest arc. I can't believe we're doing this". Brynna Arens of Den of Geek also gave a positive review, writing that it "is truly one of the best episodes of TV [he's] ever seen and if it doesn't light some kind of emotional fire within you, I don't know what will." Esquire's Brady Langmann highly praised the Ghorman Massacre, writing, "It's incredible that series creator Tony Gilroy managed to stage a set piece this massive. There were times in the battle that genuinely rivaled anything Star Wars has shown us on the big screen this decade."

"Who Are You?" briefly attained the #8 spot among the top-ranked television episodes of all time on IMDb and began a streak of five consecutive episodes (Note: "Who Are You?" through "Jedha, Kyber, Erso"; this streak has since been broken as the rating for "Who Else Knows?" has dropped below 9.5) all rated 9.5 or above on that platform, becoming the first television series to do so.

=== Accolades ===
| Award | Year | Category | Recipient(s) | Result | Ref. |
|---|---|---|---|---|---|
| ACE Eddie Awards | 2026 | Best Edited Drama Series | Yan Miles | Nominated | |
| Art Directors Guild Awards | 2026 | One-Hour Fantasy Single-Camera Series | Luke Hull | Won | |
| Cinema Audio Society Awards | 2026 | Outstanding Achievement in Sound Mixing for a Television Series – One Hour | Danny Hambrook, David Acord, Geoff Foster, Nick Roberts, and Richard Duarte | Nominated | |
| Creative Arts Emmy Awards | 2025 | Outstanding Music Composition for a Series (Original Dramatic Score) | Brandon Roberts | Nominated | |
| Creative Arts Emmy Awards | 2025 | Outstanding Original Music and Lyrics | "We Are the Ghor (Planetary Anthem)" by Nicholas Britell and Tony Gilroy | Nominated | |
| Creative Arts Emmy Awards | 2025 | Outstanding Picture Editing for a Drama Series | Yan Miles | Won | |
| Creative Arts Emmy Awards | 2025 | Outstanding Production Design for a Narrative Period or Fantasy Program (One Hour or More) | Luke Hull, Toby Britton, and Rebecca Alleway | Won | |
| Creative Arts Emmy Awards | 2025 | Outstanding Sound Editing for a Comedy or Drama Series (One Hour) | David Acord, Margit Pfeiffer, James Spencer, Josh Gold, Alyssa Nevarez, John Finklea, Ronni Brown, and Sean England | Nominated | |
| Creative Arts Emmy Awards | 2025 | Outstanding Sound Mixing for a Comedy or Drama Series (One Hour) | David Acord, Danny Hambrook, Geoff Foster, and Richard Duarte | Nominated | |
| Directors Guild of America Awards | 2026 | Outstanding Directorial Achievement in Dramatic Series | Janus Metz | Nominated | |
| Golden Reel Awards | 2026 | Outstanding Achievement in Sound Editing – Broadcast Long Form Dialogue / ADR | David Acord, Margit Pfeiffer, Josh Gold, James Spencer, Alyssa Nevarez, Ronni Brown, and Sean England | Nominated | |
| Primetime Emmy Awards | 2025 | Outstanding Directing for a Drama Series | Janus Metz | Nominated | |
| Visual Effects Society | 2026 | Outstanding Special (Practical) Effects in a Photoreal Project | Luke Murphy, Dean Ford, Jody Eltham, and Darrell Guyon | Won | |
| Visual Effects Society | 2026 | Outstanding Visual Effects in a Photoreal Episode | Mohen Leo, TJ Falls, Scott Pritchard, Olivier Beaulieu, and Luke Murphy | Nominated | |
