= What a Festive Evening =

- Andor episode
- Vel Sartha (Faye Marsay) and Cinta Kaz (Varada Sethu) reunite on Ghorman before their final mission together.
- Episode no.: Season 2 Episode 6
- Directed by: Ariel Kleiman
- Written by: Beau Willimon
- Cinematography by: Christophe Nuyens
- Editing by: John Gilroy
- Original release date: April 29, 2025
- Running time: 55 minutes

Guest appearances
- Richard Sammel as Carro Rylanz; Pierro Niel-Mee as Erskin Semaj; Thierry Godard as Lezine; Robert Emms as Lonni Jung; Jacob James Beswick as Heert; Alaïs Lawson as Enza Rylanz; Ella Pellegrini as Dreena; Ewens Abid as Tazi; Abraham Wapler as Samm; Caroline Vanier as Leeza; Théo Costa-Marini as Dilan; Alex Skarbek as Capso; Joshua James as Dr. Gorst

Episode chronology
← Previous "I Have Friends Everywhere"	Next → "Messenger"

"What a Festive Evening" is the sixth episode of the second season of the American science fiction political spy thriller drama television series Andor. It is the eighteenth episode of the series overall. It was written by Beau Willimon and directed by Ariel Kleiman.

"What a Festive Evening" was released on Disney+ on April 29, 2025 as part of a three-episode block also including "Ever Been to Ghorman?" and "I Have Friends Everywhere", and received generally favorable reviews from critics.

== Plot ==
Cassian Andor meets with Luthen Rael, and tells him of his doubt in the competency of the inexperienced rebel group the Ghorman Front. Cassian advises Rael to not get involved, despite Rael's insistence in aiding a heist—not to succeed but to send a message. Rael criticizes Cassian, who consequently refuses to return to Ghorman.

Kleya Marki sends Vel Sartha to Ghorman in Andor's stead. There she reunites with her estranged girlfriend, Cinta Kaz. Cinta reveals she was involved in a severe accident which Rael kept hidden from Vel. They both reveal they refused to join the mission if the other was not present. The pair later meet with the Ghorman Front and state their plan to rob the imperial shipments, with Vel ordering that only she and Cinta are to have weapons. They note the frustration of heist members Dreena and Samm. The leader of the front, Carro Rylanz, agrees to the plan. Vel and Cinta later retreat to a room together where they affirm their love for one another and reconcile.

Meanwhile, Andor returns to his partner Bix Caleen on Coruscant, where he becomes further angered by Rael's interference in her recovery. He confronts Rael at his gallery, threatening their cover, to protest his and Bix's autonomy outside of their roles in the rebellion. Caleen continues to use drugs. She sees a message for a rebel mission, which she wants to be part of.

Kleya and Rael attend Davo Sculdun's investiture party to extract a listening bug that will soon be discovered. ISB rebel mole Lonni Jung attends with his co-workers and is recruited by Kleya to help her. Mon Mothma and Perrin Fertha also attend the party, where they encounter Orson Krennic, who Mothma verbally spars with. Lonni and Kleya successfully remove the listening bug from an ancient artefact without detection.

The Ghorman heist initially begins smoothly, with Cinta deactivating the convoys and the Front using tunnels to transport crates. Syril Karn monitors it from afar, reporting live to Dedra Meero and Lio Partagaz. Dreena is forced to leave the group to peacefully guide away a civilian, and Vel searches for her. Samm, having disobeyed orders, pulls a blaster on passer-by Lezine and accidentally fires it, killing Cinta. Lezine carries Cinta's body whilst a devastated Vel has to be helped to the getaway vehicle. There she angrily chastises a distraught Samm for his recklessness, stating he will carry her memory forever.

Doctor Gorst, who has been newly assigned to expand his torture program, checks into work and is confronted by Bix, who leaves him tied up and listening to the same sounds that he emotionally traumatized her with. Cassian joins her as she leaves the building and activates a bomb, killing Gorst and destroying his equipment.

== Production ==
=== Writing ===
The episode was written by Beau Willimon, in his sixth writing credit for the show, and directed by Ariel Kleiman, after directing the previous five episodes of the series. During an interview with TVLine, Andor showrunner Tony Gilroy said he treats the kiss between Vel and Cinta as "a regular thing" and described their relationship something which connects to bigger themes "about revolution and what it costs you to be involved in it, and the kind of courage it takes" and defended the death of Cinta, saying that if people don't die, "it would really be disingenuous", while adding that calling for Cinta to die was "tough decision to make, tough phone calls to make to the actors".

Varada Sethu, who plays Cinta, told Variety, in an interview, that she was glad to see that "people cared about Cinta in the way that I care about her", calling it heartwarming, and saying Cinta's death was "cleverly done and...truthful in how people experience death", while saying it is "shocking", she predicted that Cinta would "die in the rebellion", and adding that if Cinta and Vel had survived, they would dream of going "into hiding somewhere if they could" but would actually "end up staying in the rebellion". In an interview with Elle, Sethu said that the death of Cinta "made perfect sense" while tragic and clever, adding that she could "fangirl about this show forever" noted that the kiss scene between Vel and Cinta was "a bit...off-the-cuff" and called the relationship between Cinta and Vel as a real and flawed which is a "mirror into the world".

=== Casting ===
By March 2023, Benjamin Bratt had been cast for the episode in an undisclosed role, later revealed to be Bail Organa, replacing Jimmy Smits in the role. In "What a Festive Evening", marking his second appearance on Andor, Ben Mendelsohn reprises his role as Orson Krennic from previous Star Wars media, including Rogue One (2016), in which he served as the main antagonist.

=== Music ===
The original score for "What a Festive Evening", as with nine other episodes of the season's twelve, (Note: All episodes of season 2 but "Ever Been to Ghorman?" and "I Have Friends Everywhere" credit Roberts as the main composer) was composed by Brandon Roberts, replacing Nicholas Britell, the composer for the show's first season, due to scheduling conflicts.

The soundtrack for the episode was released alongside that of the other two episodes in its block on May 2, 2025 via Walt Disney Records as part of the second of four volumes of the second season's original score.

Andor Season 2: Episode 6 (Original Soundtrack)
No.	Title	Length
1.	"Andor (Main Title Theme) – Episode 6"	0:39
2.	"Kafhaus Reunion"	2:20
3.	"Oathkeeper"	1:04
4.	"Sculdun Tower"	1:43
5.	"Crates in Motion"	2:43
6.	"Doctor Heal Thyself"	2:22
7.	"The Bix Is Back (Note: Composed by Nicholas Britell)"	1:41
Total length:		13:32

== Release ==
"What a Festive Evening" was released on Disney+ on April 29, 2025 as part of a three-episode block, alongside "Ever Been to Ghorman?" and "I Have Friends Everywhere".

== Reception ==
=== Critical response ===
The review aggregator website Rotten Tomatoes reports a 100% approval rating, based on 8 reviews.

William Hughes of The A.V. Club gave a positive review, writing "This episode was tense, occasionally funny, well-acted, and with a couple of stand-out moments." Mike Redmond of Pajiba also gave a positive review, summarizing that "Instead, we're literally speed-running through this season because here's the very depressing reality: It's already halfway over".

The death of Cinta Kaz in the episode received mixed reactions from critics and fans. Some critics called her death a "misstep", a "slap in the face" which furthers the "emotional arc of her white counterpart", furthers "regressive tropes" like bury your gays, reinforced the franchise's bad track record for LGBTQ characters, and said that fans were "rightfully upset", while calling inclusion of Cinta Kaz and Vel Sartha a "step forward". PinkNews and Den of Geek reported that fans were "rightfully upset" with the death of Cinta, with a "mixture of heartbreak and rage", and asserting that the series was deploying negative tropes in the process. Other critics and commenters said that the death of Cinta was a "painful reminder of how rarely our stories are allowed to be fully told", and was heartbreaking, following a trend of how "queer relationships often get written in Hollywood".

Critics for Gizmodo, TheGamer, and Polygon gave a different view. They argued that the death of Cinta did not follow negative tropes, but that treating queer characters as full characters requires "sometimes...putting them at risk" and has queer characters being "treated the same as straight ones", with her death treated with weight rather than pure "shock value", with no character safe from death in the series. These critics acknowledged that the franchise has work to do when it comes to "introducing prominent LGBTQ characters", criticized the queer representation in Star Wars as "incredibly bleak", called her death "bitter", "retrograde", and praised Vel's speech to the one who killed Cinta.

=== Accolades ===
Award	Year	Category	Recipient	Result	Ref.
Golden Reel Awards	2026	Outstanding Achievement in Music Editing – Broadcast Long Form	Ian Broucek	Nominated	
