= Ever Been to Ghorman? =

- Andor episode
- Syril Karn (Kyle Soller), now in charge of the Bureau of Standards' field office in Ghorman, walks the streets of the capital city Palmo on his way to work.
- Episode no.: Season 2 Episode 4
- Directed by: Ariel Kleiman
- Written by: Beau Willimon
- Cinematography by: Christophe Nuyens
- Editing by: Matthew Cannings
- Original release date: April 29, 2025
- Running time: 54 minutes

Guest appearances
- Joshua James as Dr. Gorst; Kathryn Hunter as Eedy Karn; Richard Sammel as Carro Rylanz; Pierro Niel-Mee as Erskin Semaj; Thierry Godard as Lezine; Forest Whitaker as Saw Gerrera; Alaïs Lawson as Enza Rylanz; Ella Pellegrini as Dreena; Ewens Abid as Tazi; Abraham Wapler as Samm; Caroline Vanier as Leeza; Théo Costa-Marini as Dilan; Alex Skarbek as Capso

Episode chronology
← Previous "Harvest"	Next → "I Have Friends Everywhere"

"Ever Been to Ghorman?" is the fourth episode of the second season of the American science fiction political spy thriller drama television series Andor. It is the sixteenth episode of the series overall; it was written by Beau Willimon and directed by Ariel Kleiman.

Set in BBY 3, (Note: 3 years before the Battle of Yavin, i.e., the climax of Star Wars (1977)) a year after the previous episode, the episode marks the return of Forest Whitaker as anarchist rebel leader Saw Gerrera, who previously appeared in the season 1 episode "Daughter of Ferrix", and is one of two episodes (Note: "Ever Been to Ghorman?" and "I Have Friends Everywhere") in the season with original music composed by Nicholas Britell, who stepped away from Andor following its first season due to scheduling conflicts. "Ever Been to Ghorman?" also introduces the planet Ghorman, which was referred to many times since the first season of the series, but hitherto never seen. Ghorman goes onto serve a central role in subsequent episodes of the season.

The episode primarily features three storylines: Cassian and Bix's attempt to adjust to a Coruscant safehouse operated by Luthen; Syril's dealings with the local Ghorman rebellion as a spy for Dedra, and Wilmon's mission with Saw Gerrera's Partisans on behalf of Luthen. Other storylines include Mon Mothma's attempts to rally votes in order to kill the Public Order Resentencing Directive, (Note: Imperial legislation introduced in "Announcement" in response to the rebel attack on Aldhani carried out in "The Eye" that expanded prison sentences and inadvertently led to Cassian's imprisonment in season 1) and Lonni Jung gathering intelligence on the ISB's secret operations on Ghorman.

"Ever Been to Ghorman?" was released on Disney+ on April 29, 2025 as part of a three-episode block also including "I Have Friends Everywhere" and "What a Festive Evening", and received positive reviews from critics.

== Plot ==
In 3BBY, Syril Karn has been promoted to a job on Ghorman, where political unrest is growing. His mother Eedy disapproves of this move, but Syril expresses support towards the Ghorman people. His employee, Leeza, is secretly an informant for a rebel group called the Ghorman Front, and Syril's statements convince them he is a sympathizer. Syril is approached by rebel member Samm, who invites him to a town meeting. Syril secretly reports this development to Dedra Meero, thereby revealing he is a plant by the Empire to uncover the rebel network. At the meeting Syril witnesses the Ghormans' impassioned pleas and Samm introduces him to rebel members Enza Rylanz and her boyfriend Dilan. The Ghorman Front leader, Carro Rylanz, who is Enza's father, also speaks to Syril, and is fooled into believing he wants to help them.

Dedra continues to work at the ISB under Lio Partagaz, but to her frustration the newly promoted supervisor Heert is placed in charge of Axis in her stead. ISB rebel mole Lonni Jung continues to infiltrate the Empire by befriending Heert and helping Captain Legret. Jung later reports to Luthen, who is interested in the Empire's interest in Ghorman but angered by Jung's limited information.

Senator Mon Mothma continues her campaign to support the Ghormans against the Empire's smear campaign and attempts to gain the support of Ghorman senator Oran. However, Oran is reluctant to provoke the Emperor by opposing him.

Wilmon Paak is sent to D'Qar to aid Saw Gerrera and his partisans in working a machine containing fuel and rhydonium. The partisans are suspicious of Wilmon and tease him. Gerrera orders Wilmon teach his soldier Pluti how to work the machine, forcing Wilmon to stay on D'Qar longer than the original agreement.

Bix Caleen and Cassian Andor have relocated to Coruscant, where Bix has turned to drugs to escape her frequent nightmares of Doctor Gorst and the soldiers she and Cassian have killed on their missions. They try to live normal lives between rebel missions. Bix sees a signal for Cassian to go on a rebel mission, and he meets with Luthen Rael. Rael tasks Andor with assessing Carro Rylanz and the Ghormans' susceptibility toward joining the Rebellion. Cassian is reluctant to leave the troubled Bix, but bids her farewell. She takes drugs after he has left.

== Production ==
=== Writing ===
The episode was written by Beau Willimon, in his fourth writing credit for the show, and directed by Ariel Kleiman, after he directed the previous three episodes of the series. The episodes of Andor's second season, like those of its first, are split up into blocks, or story arcs, of three episodes; however, unlike in season one, each arc begins with a time skip of one year from the previous episode. Series showrunner Tony Gilroy decided to structure the season this way after concluding that the original five-season plan for the show was unfeasible, and needing some way to bridge the four years between season 1 and Rogue One (2016) in a single season. As proof of concept, he wrote the first and last episodes of each would-be arc, and eventually decided on this structure for the season.

=== Casting ===
In "Ever Been to Ghorman?", marking his first appearance on the second season of Andor, Forest Whitaker reprises his role as Saw Gerrera from previous Star Wars media, including Rogue One.

=== Music ===
The original score for "Ever Been to Ghorman?" was composed by Nicholas Britell, the composer for the show's first season. Replacement composer Brandon Roberts composed the episode's title theme.

The soundtrack for the episode was released alongside that of the other two episodes in its block on May 2, 2025 via Walt Disney Records as part of the second of four volumes of the second season's original score.

Andor Season 2: Episode 4 (Original Soundtrack)
No.	Title	Length
1.	"Andor (Main Title Theme) – Episode 4 (Note: Composed by Brandon Roberts)"	0:40
2.	"The Ghorman Waltz"	2:46
3.	"Our Man in Palmo"	1:28
4.	"Safe House Dinner"	2:03
5.	"Mon-Tage"	2:28
6.	"Palmo Town Hall"	3:18
7.	"Saw Gerrera"	3:59
Total length:		17:42

== Release ==
"Ever Been to Ghorman?" was released on Disney+ on April 29, 2025 as part of a three-episode block, alongside "I Have Friends Everywhere" and "What a Festive Evening".

== Reception ==
=== Critical response ===
The review aggregator website Rotten Tomatoes reports a 100% approval rating, based on 6 reviews.

William Hughes of The A.V. Club gave a positive review, writing "More than a necessary launching point for the next big action set piece, this is a lovely portrait of life in the Empire." Mike Redmond of Pajiba also gave a positive review, summarizing that "Don't get me wrong, it's brilliant. Each episode is the richly detailed experience that fans of Andor have come to expect, but that's the problem. This arc demands a weekly release schedule".
