= 24th Visual Effects Society Awards =

2026 visual effects awards ceremony for 2025 works

24th Visual Effects Society Awards

February 25, 2026

Outstanding Visual Effects in a Photoreal Feature:
Avatar: Fire and Ash

Outstanding Visual Effects in a Photoreal Episode:
Prehistoric Planet: Ice Age: "The Big Freeze"

The 24th Visual Effects Society Awards is an awards ceremony presented by the Visual Effects Society to recognize the best in visual effects in film, television and other media in 2025. Nominations were announced on January 13, 2026, and the ceremony took place on February 25, 2026, at the Beverly Hilton in Hollywood and was hosted by the Sklar Brothers.

== Winners and nominees ==
Winners will be listed first and in bold.

=== Honorary Awards ===
Lifetime Achievement Award:

- **Jerry Bruckheimer**

Visionary Award

- **Richard Taylor**

=== Film ===
Outstanding Visual Effects in a Photoreal Feature	Outstanding Supporting Visual Effects in a Photoreal Feature
**Avatar: Fire and Ash – Richard Baneham, Peter Litvack, Eric Saindon, Nicky Muir, Steve Ingram**; F1: The Movie – Ryan Tudhope, Nikeah Forde, Robert Harrington, Nicolas Chevallier, Keith Alfred Dawson; Jurassic World: Rebirth – David Vickery, Carlos Ciudad, Steve Aplin, Charmaine Chan, Neil Corbould; The Lost Bus – Charlie Noble, Gavin Round, David Zaretti, Russell Bowen, Brandon K. McLaughlin; How To Train Your Dragon – Christian Manz, Christopher Raimo, Glen McIntosh, Glenn Melenhorst, Terry Palmer	**Sinners – Michael Ralla, James Alexander, Nick Marshall, Espen Nordahl, Donnie Dean**; Dongji Rescue – Tim Crosbie, Celeste Chen, Christian Sjöstedt, Lea Benjovitz; A House of Dynamite – Chris Harvey, Dione Wood, Jon Mitchell, Matthew Lane; Warfare – Simon Stanley-Clamp, Kaley Edwards, Andrew Kinnear, Samir Ansari, Ryan Conder; After the Hunt – Fabio Cerrito, Virginia Cefaly, Marco Fiorani Parenzi, Maura Manfredi
Outstanding Animation in an Animated Feature	Outstanding Character in a Photoreal Feature
**KPop Demon Hunters – Joshua Beveridge, Jacky Priddle, Benjamin Hendricks, Clara Chan**; The Bad Guys 2 – Pierre Perifel, Damon Ross, Matt Baer, Benjamin Willis; Zootopia 2 – Gregory Smith, Laurie Au, Marlon West, Shweta Viswanathan; In Your Dreams – Sacha Kapijimpangan Carey Smith, Nicola Lavender, Steve Pilcher; Elio – Claudia Chung Sanii, Mary Alice Drumm, Harley Jessup, Dave Quirus	**Avatar: Fire and Ash: "Varang: Leader of the Ash Clan" – Stephen Clee, Stuart Adcock, Keven Norris, Joseph Kim**; A Minecraft Movie: "Queen Malgosha" – Kevin Estey, Fabio Leporelli, Matteo Stirati, Nick Grace; Lilo & Stitch: "Stitch" – Matthew Shumway, Claus Pedersen, Xiying Zhai, Enrique Mateo-Sagasta; Superman: "Krypto the Superdog" – Loic Mireault, Martine Chartrand, Marianne Morency, Matthias Schoenegger
Outstanding Character in an Animated Feature	Outstanding Environment in a Photoreal Feature
**KPop Demon Hunters: "Rumi" – Sophia (Seung Hee) Lee, Andrea Centeno, Marc Souliere, Joshua Beveridge**; Elio: "Ooooo the Liquid Supercomputer" – Catherine Luo, Anna-Christine Lykkegaard, Ferdi Scheepers, Julian Teo; Elio: "Glordon" – Marco Burbano, Edgar Rodriguez, Ben Rush, Patrick Yu Wang; Zootopia 2: "Gary De'Snake" – Adam Green, Jennifer Stratton, Christoffer Pedersen, Jesse Erickson	**Avatar: Fire and Ash: "Bridgehead Industrial City" – Gianluca Pizzaia, Steve Bevins, Dziga Kaiser, Zsolt Máté**; Tron: Ares: "Dillinger's Grid City" – Jared Michael, Noor Valibhoy, Cody Gramstad, Stefan Litterini; The Lost Bus: "The Wildfires of Roe Road" – Jamie Haydock, Francesco Ferraresi, Sergei Konorev, Frederick Vallee; The Lost Bus: "Feather River Canyon by the Pulga Bridge" – David Schulz, Mareike Loges, Björn Markgraf, Philipp Hafellner; The Gorge: "The Bodyweb" – Daniel James Cox, Yosuke Inomata, Clint Rea, Gabriel Pires
Outstanding Environment in an Animated Feature	Outstanding Effects Simulations in a Photoreal Feature
**Zootopia 2: "Marsh Market" – Limei Z. Hshieh, Alexander Nicholas Whang, Joshua Fry, Ryan DeYoung**; Elio: "The Communiverse" – Steve Arguello, Christopher M. Burrows, Andy Lin, Laura Murphy; KPop Demon Hunters: "Seoul" – Rafael Lescano, Gunsik Kim, Tyquane Wright, Hee-Chel Nam; The Bad Guys 2: "Cairo City" – John J. Lee, Greg Hettinger, Mikael Genachte-Le Bail, Mayumi Shimokawa	**Avatar: Fire and Ash: "Simulating Pandora" – Nicholas Illingworth, Sarah C. Farmer, James Robinson, Ryan Bowden**; Superman: "Metropolis City Destruction" – Rick Hankins, Marcel Kern, Eric Hollands, Masoud Aziminajjar; The Lost Bus: "Escape from Hell" – Billy Copley, Mathieu Chardonnet, Chetan Patkar, David Schott; Together – Darcy George, Andrew Dunkerley, Ray Leung, Steve Oakley
Outstanding Effects Simulations in an Animated Feature	Outstanding Compositing & Lighting in a Feature
**KPop Demon Hunters – Filippo Maccari, Nikolaos Finizio, Daniel La Chapelle, Srdjan Milosevic**; In Your Dreams – Stephanie McNair, Dmitiry Kolesnik, Stephen Paschke, David Sellares; The Bad Guys 2 – Michael Losure, Landon Gray, Zachary Glynn, Steve Avoujageli; Zootopia 2 – Sujil Sukumaran, Stuart Griese, Zoran Stojanoski, Paul Carman	**F1: The Movie: "Modern Race and POV Footage" – Hugo Gauvreau, Chris Davies, Raushan Raj, Amaury Rospars**; Avatar: Fire and Ash: "Bridgehead Industrial City" – Ziad Shureih, Stefano Oggeri, Jaume Creus Costabella, Hugo Debat-Burkarth; Superman: "Fights and Metropolis City Destruction" – Can Chang, Nicolas Caillier, Bryan Smeall, Elona Musha; Avatar: Fire and Ash: "The Wind Traders, Bridgehead, Rivers and Ocean" – Alex Klaricich, Gianfranco Sgura, Brad Floyd, Ari Ross
Outstanding CG Cinematography	Outstanding Model in a Photoreal or Animated Project
**Avatar: Fire and Ash – Steve Deane, AJ Briones, Zachary Brake, Andrew Moffett**; Zootopia 2 – Tyler Kupferer, Daniel Rice, Griselda Sastrawinata-Lemay; Tron: Ares – Jhon Alvarado, Michael Beaulieu, Jayden Beveridge, Hayley Kim; KPop Demon Hunters – Benjamin Hendricks, Gary H. Lee, Randolph Lizarda, Linh Mai Nguyen Chan	**Avatar: Fire and Ash: "The Windtraders' Gondola" – Michael Smale, Sam Sharplin, Joe W. Churchill, Jacqi Dillon**; Mickey 17: "The Nifleheim Spaceship" – Bikas Panigrahi, Nikolai Razuev, Ajinkya Nitin Phokmare, Manoj Vijay Kamble; Wicked: For Good: "Bison" – Marco Chau, Giorgio Pennisi, Sowmya Ramakumar, Balazs Meszaros; Superman: "The Fortress of Solitude" – Crystal Bretz, Martin Pelissier, Klaudio Ladavac, Conner Wessinger
Outstanding Special (Practical) Effects in a Photoreal Project	Emerging Technology Award
**Andor: "Who Are You?" – Luke Murphy, Dean Ford, Jody Eltham, Darrell Guyon (Disney+)**; Gen V: "Bags" – Hudson Kenny, Curtis Carlson, John Koyama, Bruno Larizza (Prime Video)	**Avatar: Fire and Ash: "Kora Fire Toolset" – Alexey Dmitrievich Stomakhin, John Edholm, Murali Ramachari, Aleksandr Isakov**; Win or Lose: "Detached Facial Features" – David Munier, Ana Gabriela Lacaze, Jonathan Page, Anna-Christine Lykkegaard; Mickey 17: "REVIZE" – John Bastian, Ben Ward, Thomas Rowntree, Robert Beveridge; Avatar: Fire and Ash: "BodyOpt" – Christoph Sprenger, Tobias Mack, Florian Fernandez, Niall Ryan; Elio: "Real-Time High Fidelity Animation System Using Signed Distance Functions" – Andrew Butts, Trent Crow, Anna-Christine Lykkegaard, Catherine Luo

=== Television ===
Outstanding Visual Effects in a Photoreal Episode	Outstanding Supporting Visual Effects in a Photoreal Episode
**Prehistoric Planet: Ice Age: "The Big Freeze" – Russell Dodgson, Tracey Gibbons, Francois Dumoulin, Gavin McKenzie (Apple TV+)**; Andor: "Who Are You?" – Mohen Leo, TJ Falls, Scott Pritchard, Olivier Beaulieu, Luke Murphy (Disney+); It: Welcome to Derry: "Winter Fire" – Daryl Sawchuk, Steve Dellerson, Pier Lefebvre, Steven Tether, Darcy Callaghan (HBO); The Last of Us: "Through the Valley" – Alex Wang, Fiona Campbell Westgate, Nick Epstein, Philip Engström, Joel Whist (HBO); Stranger Things: "Chapter Eight: The Rightside Up" – Betsy Paterson, Tessa Roehl, Michael Maher Jr., Martin Hill (Netflix)	**The Residence: "The Fall of the House of Usher" – Seth Hill, Tesa Kubicek, John Nelson, Gabriel Vargas (Netflix)**; Man vs. Baby: "Chapter One" – Rob Duncan, Ashlee Turner, Jean-Nicolas Costa, Adrian Eugene Daniel Williams (Netflix); The Walking Dead: Daryl Dixon: "Costa da Morte" – Jao M’Changama, Justine Paynat-Sautivet, Sébastien Voisin, Xavier Allard, Pau Costa Moeller (AMC); Severance: "Hello, Ms. Cobel" – Eric Leven, Sean Findley, Brian Holligan, Radost Ridlen (Apple TV+); Death by Lightning: "The Man from Ohio" – Rainer Gombos, Steve Kullback, Marko Ljubez, David Ramos (Netflix)
Outstanding Visual Effects in a Commercial	Outstanding Character in an Episodic, Commercial, Game Cinematic, or Real-Time Project
**BMW: "Heart of Joy | Meet Okto the Octopus" – Tom Raynor, Helen Tang, Jack Harris, Alex Kulikov**; Coors Light: "Slow Monday" – Bruno Fukumothi, Ella Glazer, David Fleet, Martino Madeddu; Virgin Media: "Trunk Trucker" – Sebastian Caldwell, Larisa Covaciu, Ben Cronin, Alex Grey; Columbia Sportswear: "Engineered for Whatever" – Kamen Markov, Alexia Paterson, David Lochhead, Henrique Campanha; Battlefield 6: "It's Good to Be Back" – Michael Ralla, James Alexander, Brian Creasey, Luca Pelegatta	**It: Welcome to Derry: "The Thing in the Dark"; "The Pickle Monster" – Philip Harris-Genois, Pierric Danjou, Chloe Ostiguy, Jonathan Bourdua (HBO)**; It: Welcome to Derry: "Winter Fire"; "Pennywise" – Théo Perronard, Yan Morin-Dubuisson, Yan Detang, Jonathan Fleming-Bock (HBO); Stranger Things: "Chapter Eight: The Rightside Up"; "Mindflayer" – James Moore, Layne Howe, Shawn Warawa, Yoshihiro Harimoto (Netflix); Prehistoric Planet: Ice Age: "Female Smilodon" – Alvise Avati, Marc-André Coulombe, Youen Leclerc, Andrea De Martis (Apple TV+)
Outstanding Environment in an Episodic, Commercial, Game Cinematic or Real-Time Project	Outstanding Effects Simulations in an Episode, Commercial, Game Cinematic or Real-Time Project
**Andor: "Welcome to the Rebellion" – John O’Connell, Falk Boje, Hasan Ilhan, Kevin George (Disney+)**; Foundation: "A Song for the End of Everything"; "Clarion Station" – Sylvain Lesaint, Ilyes Boutemeur, Blake Dewoody, Benjamin Rojek (Apple TV+); The Last of Us: "Post-Apocalyptic Seattle" – Romain Simonnet, Abraham Ibanez, David Desplat, Minguk Lee (HBO); The Residence: "Dial M for Murder"; "The White House Exterior" – Gabriel Vargas, Eric Schoellnast, Andrew Wilkins, Omer Gurkan (Netflix)	**Prehistoric Planet: Ice Age: "The Big Freeze" – Edward Ferrysienanda, Kevin Christensen, Guy Schuleman, Kevin Tarpinian (Apple TV+)**; Battlefield 6 – Björn Åkerstedt, Anders Egleus, Kasra Kalami, Craig Moroney; The Last of Us: "Through the Valley"; "The Infected Horde" – Duarte Victorino, Claudio Gonzalez, Andre Castelao, Igor Bondar (HBO); Stranger Things: "Chapter Eight: The Rightside Up"; "Assault on the Mindflayer" – Michael Chrobak, Brandon James Fleet, Yasunobu Arahori, Hoi Ying Fung (Netflix)
Outstanding Compositing and Lighting in an Episode	Outstanding Compositing and Lighting in a Commercial
**The Last of Us: "Through the Valley"; "A Storm of Ice, Fire and Flesh" – Tobias Wiesner, Mark Julien, Owen Longstaff, Brendan Naylor (HBO)**; The Residence: "Pilot" – Spencer Hecox, Gunnar Heiss, Alexander Greenberg, Eric Schoellnast (Netflix); Stranger Things: "Chapter Eight: The Rightside Up"; "The Abyss and Vecna's Face" – Ben Roberts, Rachel E. Herbert, Don Bradford, Ken Lam (Netflix); Prehistoric Planet: Ice Age – Puff Pisanwalerd, Jean-Baptiste Noyau, Marion Nove-Josserand, Sue Nelson (Apple TV+)	**BMW: "Heart of Joy | Meet Okto the Octopus" – Alex Kulikov, Jack Harris, Adam Chabane, Nicola Borsari**; Disney: "Best Christmas Ever" – Hudson Martins, Luke Warpus, Jinhui Wang, Alex Miller; Virgin Media: "Trunk Trucker" – Alex Grey, Sebastian Caldwell, Nicola Borsari, Giacomo Cavaletti; Genesis: "No Old Ideas" – Greg McKneally, Christian Block, Alberto Pizzocchero, Alessandro Granella

=== Other categories ===
Outstanding Visual Arts in a Real-Time Project	Outstanding Visual Effects in a Special Venue Project
**Ghost of Yōtei – Jason Connell, Matt Vainio, Joanna Wang, Jasmin Patry**; Death Stranding 2: On the Beach – Hideo Kojima, Yoji Shinkawa, Shota Hirasawa; Doom: The Dark Ages – Todd Boyce, Andrew Willis, Ian Malerich, Derek Best; South of Midnight – Ian Mac Gregor, Yasmeen Leclerc, Petro Kosariekov, Connor Bugni; Battlefield 6 – Chris Bayol, Sean Tomek, Skye White, Jacob Bergman	**The Wizard of Oz at Sphere – Ben Grossmann, Tamara Watts Kent, Dr. Irfan Essa, Matt Dougan, Glenn Derry**; Zootopia: Better Zoogether! – Rich Enders, Kirk Bodyfelt, Darin Hollings, Darren Simpson; Monsters Unchained: The Frankenstein Experiment – Alan Woods, Maximilian McNair MacEwan, Jason Fox, Iris Chailloux; Disney Tales of Magic – Tim Lutkin, Patrick Aigouy, Adrien Mourey, Lydia Caplan; Stranger Things: Escape the Dark – Julien Héry, Antoine Sitruk, Simon Lecavalier, Martin Hesselink
Outstanding Visual Effects in a Student Project
**Azimuth – Thomas Teisseire, Cassandre Cinier, Martin Bluy, Mathis Giraudeau**; Au Delà des Mots – Antoine Barbannaud, Leandro Leijnen, Timothé Vergught, Mathis De Sauvecanne; Flying From War – Ciara Borgards; Two Kings – Eliot Hervier Blondel, Mathieu Keraudran, Adrian Delmotte, Jonas Lopez Del Castillo; A Sparrow's Song – Tobias Eckerlin, Vincent Maurer, Elias Weber, Lilli-Luisa Heckmann
