= Golden Reel Awards 2025 =

Sound editing awards

73rd Golden Reel Awards
- Date: March 8, 2026
- Location: Wilshire Ebell Theatre; Los Angeles, California, U.S.
- Presented by: Motion Picture Sound Editors
- Hosted by: Patton Oswalt
- Most wins: Death Stranding 2: On the Beach; Sinners (2)
- Most nominations: One Battle After Another; Sinners; Stranger Things; Ghost of Yōtei (3)

The 73rd Golden Reel Awards, presented by the Motion Picture Sound Editors (MPSE), honored the best in sound editing for film, television, video games, and student film in 2025. The ceremony was held on March 8, 2026, at the Wilshire Ebell Theatre in Los Angeles.

The nominations were announced on January 12, 2026. The action thriller film One Battle After Another, the period supernatural horror film Sinners, the television series Stranger Things, and the video game Ghost of Yōtei all led the nominations with three each.

American supervising sound editor Mark Mangini received the Career Achievement Award, while American film producer Kathleen Kennedy was honored with the Filmmaker Award.

Actor and comedian Patton Oswalt hosted the ceremony for the fourth consecutive year.

== Winners and nominees ==
The winners are listed first and in bold.

=== Film ===
Outstanding Achievement in Sound Editing – Feature Dialogue / ADR	Outstanding Achievement in Sound Editing – Feature Effects / Foley
**Sinners – Benjamin A. Burtt (supervising sound editor); David V. Butler (supervising dialogue editor); Jason W. Freeman (dialogue editor); David V. Butler (ADR editor)**; Bugonia – Johnnie Burn (supervising sound editor); Neil Leachman (dialogue editor); F1 – Al Nelson, Gwendolyn Yates Whittle (supervising sound editors); Chris Gridley (supervising dialogue editor); Ryan Cota (dialogue editor); Frankenstein – Nelson Ferreira (supervising sound editor); Stephen Barden, Dustin Harris, Danielle McBride, Jill Purdy (dialogue editors); One Battle After Another – Christopher Scarabosio (supervising sound editor); Richard Quinn (dialogue editor)	**Frankenstein – Nathan Robitaille (supervising sound editor and sound designer); Paul Germann, Scott Hitchon, Craig MacLellan, Dashen Naidoo (sound effects editors); Chelsea Body (foley editor); Goro Koyama, Sandra Fox (foley artists)**; Anemone – Steve Fanagan (supervising sound editor); Steve Fanagan (sound designer); James Tebbitt (foley editor); Caoimhe Doyle (foley artist); F1 – Al Nelson, Gwendolyn Yates Whittle (supervising sound editors); Thom Brennan (foley supervisor); Benjamin A. Burtt, Kim B. Christensen, Luke Dunn Gielmuda, Scott Guitteau (sound effects editors); Sean England, Heikki Kossi, Shelley Roden (foley artists); One Battle After Another – Christopher Scarabosio (supervising sound editor and sound designer); Justin Doyle, Jeremy Molod (sound effects editors); Steve Hammond, Goro Koyama (foley artists); Sinners – Benjamin A. Burtt (supervising sound editor); Willard Overstreet (supervising foley editor); Steve Boeddeker (sound designer); David Hughes (sound effects editor); Alyson Dee Moore, Katie Rose (foley artists)
Outstanding Achievement in Music Editing – Feature Motion Picture	Outstanding Achievement in Music Editing – Documentary
**Sinners – Felipe Pacheco (music editor)**; KPop Demon Hunters – Oren Yaacoby (music editor); Mission: Impossible – The Final Reckoning – Cécile Tournesac (supervising music editor); Timeri Duplat (music editor); One Battle After Another – Graeme Stewart (music editor); Wicked: For Good – Catherine Wilson, Jack Dolman (supervising music editors); Robin Baynton (supervising vocal editor)	**Billy Joel: And So It Goes: "Part 1" – Shari Johanson (supervising music editor); Debora Lilavois (music editor)**; The Beatles Anthology: "Episode 9" – Tim Chaproniere, Emile de la Rey, Alexis Feodoroff (supervising music editors); Tyrone Frost, Claudia Holmstead-Morris, Hunter Jackson (music editors); Becoming Led Zeppelin – Nick Bergh, Dan Gitlin, Bernard MacMahon (music editors); It's Never Over, Jeff Buckley – Michael Brake (music editor); Stans – Julie Glaze Houlihan (music editor)
Outstanding Achievement in Sound Editing – Feature Documentary	Outstanding Achievement in Sound Editing – Feature Animation
**Deaf President Now! – Eilam Hoffman, Nina Hartstone, Jacob Bloomfield-Misrach (supervising sound editors); Adam Méndez (foley supervisor); Samir Foco, Eilam Hoffman, Nina Hartstone, Michael Harte, Tom Sayers (sound designers); Adam Armitage (sound editor); Greg Francis (dialogue editor); Rob Davidson (foley editor); Oli Ferris (foley artist)**; Becoming Led Zeppelin – Nick Bergh (supervising sound editor); Bernard MacMahon, Dan Gitlin (sound designers); Nick Bergh, Dan Gitlin (sound effects editors); Dan Gitlin, Nick Bergh (dialogue editors); I Was Born This Way – Leslie Gaston-Bird (supervising sound editor); Lauren Cooper, Lora Cornes (sound editors); It's Never Over, Jeff Buckley – Lewis Goldstein (supervising sound editor); Alexis Soto (sound effects editor); Viktor – Peter Albrechtsen (supervising sound editor); Heikki Kossi, Peter Albrechtsen, Nicolas Becker (sound designers); Mikkel Nielsen (sound effects editor); Kristoffer Salting (dialogue editor)	**Zootopia 2 – Jeremy Bowker (supervising sound editor); Brad Semenoff (supervising dialogue editor); Stephen M. Davis, Earl Ghaffari (supervising music editors); Jeremy Bowker (sound designer); Luke Dunn Gielmuda, Joel Raabe, Kimberly Patrick, Cameron Barker (sound effects editors); Jacob Riehle, Angela Ang (dialogue editors); Kendall Demarest (senior music editor); Jordan Myers (foley editor); Ronni Brown, Sean England (foley artists)**; The Bad Guys 2 – Ken McGill, Julian Slater (supervising sound editors); Paul Pirola (supervising foley editor); Cathryn Wang (sound effects editor); Elio – Jeremy Bowker (supervising sound editor); Cheryl Nardi (supervising dialogue editor); Jordan Myers (supervising foley editor); Jeremy Bowker (sound designer); Steve Bissinger, Jessey Drake, Richard Gould, Joel Raabe (sound effects editors); Ronni Brown, Jana Vance (foley artists); KPop Demon Hunters – Michael Babcock (supervising sound editor); Branden Spencer (supervising dialogue editor); Michael Babcock, Chris Diebold, Jeff Sawyer, Trevor Gates, Katie Halliday (sound designers); Goeun Lee Everett, Russell Topal (sound effects editors); Ian Herzon, Beso Kacharava (foley editors)
Outstanding Achievement in Sound Editing – Feature International
**Sirāt – Laia Casanovas (supervising sound editor); Oriol Donat i Martos, Claudi Dosta Ivanow (sound effects editors); Irene Rausell (dialogue editor); Miguel Barbosa (foley artist)**; Belén – Leandro de Loredo (supervising sound editor); Tomás Ramos (sound effects editor); Lucía Biscayart (dialogue editor); Gabriel Santamaria, Florencia Velardita (foley artists); Dongji Rescue – Kang Fu (supervising sound editor); Steve Miller (sound effects editor); Fei Yu (music editor); Tie Zheng Wang (foley editor); Sound of Falling – Billie Mind (supervising sound editor); Jürgen Scholz, Billie Mind (sound designers); Sebastian Heyser (dialogue editor); Thomas Köhler (foley editor); Maximiliane Pongratz (foley artist)

=== Broadcast media ===
Outstanding Achievement in Sound Editing – Broadcast Long Form Dialogue and ADR	Outstanding Achievement in Sound Editing – Broadcast Long Form Effects and Foley
**Adolescence: "Episode 2" – James Drake (supervising sound editor); Emma Butt (ADR editor); Michele Woods (dialogue editor) (Netflix)**; The Pitt: "7:00 P.M." – Bryan Parker (supervising sound editor); Kristen Hirlinger (dialogue editor); Vince Tennant (ADR editor) (HBO Max); Severance: "Cold Harbor" – Jacob Ribicoff (supervising sound editor); Gregg Swiatlowski (supervising dialogue/ADR editor) (Apple TV+); Stranger Things: "Chapter Four: Sorcerer" – Craig Henighan, Will Files (supervising sound editors); Ryan Cole (dialogue/ADR supervisor); Polly McKinnon, Korey Pereira, Graham Terry, Emma Present (dialogue editors) (Netflix); Task: "Vagrants" – Lidia Tamplenizza (supervising sound editor); Michael McMenomy (dialogue editor); Mar Heredia (ADR editor) (HBO Max)	**Alien: Earth: "Neverland" – Lee Gilmore, Brad North (supervising sound editors); Beso Kacharava (supervising foley editor); Nolan McNaughton, Justin Davey, Chris Terhune, Craig Henighan (sound designers); Tim Walston, Matt "Smokey" Cloud, Albert Romero (sound effects editors); Alexander Sanikidze, Rati Chkhetiani, Levan Tserediani (foley editors) (FX on Hulu)**; Andor: "Who Are You?" – David Acord, Margit Pfeiffer (supervising sound editors); Margit Pfeiffer (supervising ADR editor); David Acord (sound designer); Josh Gold (sound effects editor); James Spencer (dialogue editor); Alyssa Nevarez (foley editor); Ronni Brown, Sean England (foley artists) (Disney+); The Last of Us: "Through the Valley" – Michael J. Benavente (supervising sound editor); Randy Wilson (supervising foley editor); Christopher Battaglia, Chris Terhune (sound designers); Mitchell Lestner, Jacob Flack, Odin Benitez (sound effects editors); Joe Schiff (dialogue editor); Justin Helle, Ron Mellegers (foley editors); Stefan Fraticelli, Brandon Bak, Jason Charbonneau, Biko Gogaladze (foley artists) (HBO Max); Pluribus: "Pirate Lady" – Nick Forshager (supervising sound editor); Todd Toon (sound designer); Jeff Cranford (foley editor); Jason Charbonnaeu, Stefan Fraticelli (foley artists) (Apple TV+); Stranger Things: "Chapter Four: Sorcerer" – Will Files, Craig Henighan (supervising sound editors); Angelo Palazzo, David Grimaldi, Katie Halliday, Nolan McNaughton, Christopher Bonis, Nicholas Interlandi, Steve Neal, Matt "Smokey" Cloud (sound effects editors); Gina Wark, Peter Persaud (foley editors); Steve Baine (foley artist) (Netflix)
Outstanding Achievement in Sound Editing – Non-Theatrical Feature	Outstanding Achievement in Sound Editing – Non-Theatrical Animation
**The Gorge – Ethan Van der Ryn, Erik Aadahl, Paul Hackner (supervising sound editors); Stephanie Brown, David V. Butler (dialogue/ADR supervisors); Jonathan Klein, Roni Pillischer (supervising foley editors); David Farmer, Dane A. Davis, Bill R. Dean, Frederic Dubois, Darren Maynard (sound designers); Christopher Battaglia, Javier Bennassar, Goeun Lee Everett, Jon Greasley, Jason W. Jennings, Nolan McNaughton (sound effects editors); James Morioka, Kira Roessler (dialogue editors); Sally Boldt (music editor); Chris White (foley editor); Leslie Bloome, Shaun Brennan, Curtis Henderson (foley artists)**; Beast of War – Sam Gain-Emery (supervising sound editor); Hayden Riley (supervising dialogue editor); Steve Burgess (supervising foley editor); Lachlan Harris (sound designer); Jennifer Leonforte, Kiah Roache-Turner (sound effects editors); Tom Herdman (dialogue editor); Dylan Burgess (foley artist) (Bronte Pictures); The Hand That Rocks the Cradle – Lee Gilmore (supervising sound editor); Polly McKinnon (supervising dialogue editor); Beso Kacharava (supervising foley editor); Justin Davey (sound designer); Nolan McNaughton, Matt "Smokey" Cloud (sound effects editors); Ryan Cole (dialogue editor); Dachi Abesalashvili, Alexander Sanikidze (foley editors); Tornike Dzidzikashvili, Biko Gogaladze (foley artists) (Hulu); Star Trek: Section 31 – Matthew E. Taylor (supervising sound editor); Michael Schapiro (sound designer); Alex Pugh, Kip Smedley, Andrew Twite (sound effects editors); Austin Olivia Kendrick (dialogue editor); Sebastian Sheehan Visconti (ADR editor); Darrin Mann, Clay Weber (foley editors); Alyson Dee Moore, Katie Rose (foley artists) (Paramount+)	**Predator: Killer of Killers – Chris Terhune, Will Files (supervising sound editors); Jessie Anne Spence (supervising dialogue editor); Justin Davey, Lee Gilmore, James Miller (sound designers); Matt "Smokey" Cloud, Luis Galdames, Nolan McNaughton, Steve Neal, Matt Yocum (sound editors); Julie Diaz, Ailene Roberts (dialogue editors); Kailyn Jenkins, Jacob McNaughton, Samuel Munoz, Nick Neutra (foley editors); Noel Vought, Adam Decoster (foley artists) (Hulu)**; Diary of a Wimpy Kid: The Last Straw – Tess Fournier (supervising sound editor); Katie Jackson, Tim Vindigni, Vivian Williams (sound effects editors); Logan Romjue (dialogue editor); Nathan Yamaguchi (foley editor) (Disney+); Invincible: "I Thought You'd Never Shut Up" – Brad Meyer (supervising sound editor); Natalia Saavedra Brychcy, Katie Jackson, Noah Kowalski, Jayson Niner, Mia Perfetti (sound effects editors); Logan Romjue (dialogue editor); Carol Ma (foley artist) (Prime Video); Transformers: EarthSpark: "Legacy of Hope" – Brad Meyer (supervising sound editor); Natalia Saavedra Brychcy, Jacob Cook, Brad Meyer, Kyle Stockbridge, Vivian Williams (sound effects editors); Christine Gamache, Michael Wessner (dialogue editors); Tim Vindigni, Nathan Yamaguchi (foley editors) (Paramount+)
Outstanding Achievement in Sound Editing – Broadcast Short Form	Outstanding Achievement in Sound Editing – Broadcast Animation
**Murderbot: "All Systems Red" – Tyler Whitham (supervising sound editor); Danielle McBride (supervising ADR editor); Craig MacLellan (sound effects editor); Ève Corrêa-Guedes (dialogue editor); John Elliot (foley artist) (Apple TV+)**; The Bear: "Scallop" – Steve "Major" Giammaria (supervising sound editor); Jonathan Fuhrer, Matt Snedecor (sound effects editors); John Bowen (ADR editor); Leslie Bloome, Shaun Brennan (foley artists) (FX on Hulu); Only Murders in the Building: "LESTR" – Danika Wikke, Mathew Waters (supervising sound editors); Brad Katona (sound effects editor); Brian Dunlop (dialogue editor); Sanaa Kelley (foley editor); Iris Dutour, Sanaa Kelley (foley artists) (Hulu); Side Quest: "Fugue" – Matthew E. Taylor (supervising sound editor); Pete Nicholas, Charlie Campagna (sound effects editors); Sean Hessinger (dialogue editor); John Sanacore, Nathan Nadell (foley editors); Rick Owens (foley artist) (Apple TV+); The Studio: "The Golden Globes" – George Haddad (supervising sound editor); Randy Wilson (foley supervisor); Lloyd Stuart Martin (sound effects editor); Borja Sau (dialogue editor); Justin Helle (foley editor) (Apple TV+)	**Love, Death & Robots: "400 Boys" – Brad North (supervising sound editor); Craig Henighan, Matt "Smokey" Cloud (sound effects editors); Matt Manselle, Lyndsey Schenk (foley editors); Brian Straub (foley artist) (Netflix)**; Blood of Zeus: "A Breath Before Dying" – Rob McIntyre (supervising sound editor); Evan Dockter, Cat Gensler, Lawrence Reyes (sound designers) (Netflix); Marvel Zombies: "Episode 1" – Jonathan Greber (supervising sound editor); Jeremy Molod (supervising foley editor); Krysten Mate (sound designer); Jonathon Stevens, Jamey Scott (sound effects editors) (Disney+); Rick and Morty: "Summer of All Fears" – Hunter Curra (supervising sound editor); Corbin Bumeter (sound effects editor); James A. Moore, Ricardo Watson, Lee Harting (dialogue editors) (Cartoon Network); Star Wars: Tales of the Underworld: "Friends" – David W. Collins, Matthew Wood (supervising sound editors); Matthew Wood (supervising ADR editor); Frank Rinella (supervising foley editors); David W. Collins, Michael Brinkman, Bill Rudolph (sound designers); Kevin Bolen, Michael Brinkman, Bill Rudolph (sound effects editors); Angela Ang, Chris Cirino, Bobby Garza, Kevin Hart, Carlos Sotolongo (dialogue editors) (Disney+)
Outstanding Achievement in Music Editing – Broadcast Long Form	Outstanding Achievement in Music Editing – Broadcast Short Form
**Étoile: "The Hiccup" – John Finklea (music editor) (Prime Video)**; Andor: "What a Festive Evening" – Ian Broucek (music editor) (Disney+); The Last of Us: "Through the Valley" – Maarten Hofmeijer (lead music editor) (HBO Max); Severance: "Cold Harbor" – Lena Glikson, Scott Hanau (music editors) (Apple TV+); Stranger Things: "Chapter Four: Sorcerer" – Evyen Klean, David Klotz (music editors) (Netflix)	**Wolf King: "The Rise of the Wolf" – Thomas Haines (lead music editor); Steve Bond (music editor) (Netflix)**; The Bear: "Soubise" – Jeff Lingle, Jason Lingle (music editors) (FX on Hulu); Love, Death & Robots: "400 Boys" – Jeff Charbonneau (music editor) (Netflix); Only Murders in the Building: "The House Always..." – Micha Liberman (music editor) (Hulu); The Studio: "The War" – Lorena Perez Batista (music editor) (Apple TV+)
Outstanding Achievement in Sound Editing – Non-Theatrical Documentary
**Love+War – Deborah Wallach (supervising sound editor); Nick Caramela (sound effects editor); Matt Rigby (dialogue editor); Chris White (foley editor); Leslie Bloome, Shaun Brennan (foley artists) (National Geographic)**; 100 Foot Wave – Keith Hodne (supervising sound editor); Kevin Senzaki, Eric Di Stefano (sound designers); Eli Akselrod, Mika Anami (sound effects editors); Max Holland (dialogue editor) (HBO Max); The Beatles Anthology: "Episode 9" – Alexis Feodoroff, Emile de la Rey, Tim Chaproniere (supervising sound editors); Al Sirkett (sound designer) (Disney+); Billy Joel: And So It Goes: "Part One" – Gregg Swiatlowski (supervising sound editor); Tim Obzud (sound effects editor) (HBO Max); John Candy: I Like Me – Jonathan Greber (supervising sound editor); Christopher Lafaye (sound effects editor) (Prime Video)

=== Video games ===
Outstanding Achievement in Sound Editing – Game Dialogue / ADR	Outstanding Achievement in Music Editing – Game Music
**Death Stranding 2: On the Beach – Justin Scott Wilson (supervising dialogue editor); Masashi Takada, Briana Villarreal (dialogue designers); Dominic Roocroft (dialogue editor)**; Battlefield 6 – Mari Saastamoinen Minto, Jeff Wilson (senior audio directors); Rob Gardner (audio director – voice); Glen Gathard (sound supervisor); Eric Marks (dialogue editorial supervisor); Paul Fonarev (supervising dialogue editor); Sean Wilson, Clément Visseq, Olle Persson, Adam Philp, Axel Szelag, Gavin Rouse, Ryan Salt (audio programmers); Patrick Biason, Nick Friedemann (lead voice designers); Chong Aik Ming, Oscar Myrland (senior voice designers); Jim Shacklock (senior voice over designer); Priscilla Achampong, Chris Chan, Jeff Quinn, Alvaro Vela (voice designers); Ernesto Cantillo, Aryo Nazaradeh (technical voice designers); Feri Gutierrez, Kimmy Bohlin Keelyn, Daniel Khim, Matt Klimek (dialogue editors); Ghost of Yōtei – Brad Meyer (audio director); Jareth Turner, Duncan Gillies (supervising dialogue editors); Dale Curtis, Benjamin Gendron-Smith, Rory Given, Robert Kubicki, Kevin McClelland, David Pierre, Heather Plunkard, Dedrick Sarzaba, Ryan Schaad, HuiYun Tay (dialogue designers); Brianna Wing, Jeric Chapman (audio QAs); Mafia: The Old Country – Andrej Smoljan (audio lead); Matt Bauer (audio director); Erik Schmall (supervising dialogue editor); Brian Ploof (technical sound designer); Josh Holloway, Petr Klimunda, Pavel Smely (senior audio artist)	**Ghost of Yōtei – Andrew Buresh, Sonia Coronado, Ted Kocher, Scott Shoemaker (supervising music editors); Peter Scaturro, Keith Leary (music directors); Andrew Karboski, Yuen Man Chung Kelvin, Monty Mudd, Udit Srivathsan (music editors)**; Borderlands 4 – Jesse Lemons (lead technical sound designer); Bob Dudasik (lead audio programmer); Mark Petty (managing director of audio); Julian Peterson (associate director of music); Christian Pacaud (expert music designer); Joshua Michael Carro (music designer); Casey Di Iorio (music editor); Call of Duty: Black Ops 7 – Jeremiah Sypult, Brian Tuey (audio directors); Collin Ayers, Andy Bayless, Darren Blondin, Shaun Chen, Scott Eckert, Jacob Harley, Alex Hemlock, Jim Lordeman, James McCawley, Louie Schultz, Kevin Sherwood (music editors); Death Stranding 2: On the Beach – Kotaro Mori (lead sound programmer); Monty Mudd (lead music designer); Andrew Buresh (supervising music designer); Tao-Ping Chen, Sonia Coronado, Kye Cree-Voce, Robert Goodson, Bradley Gurwin, Collin Lewis, Nick Mastroianni, Seira Ishimura McCarthy, Laryssa Okada, Jin Qin, Kelvin Yuen (music designers); Yuji Yamagishi (music implementor)
Outstanding Achievement in Sound Editing – Game Effects / Foley
**Death Stranding 2: On the Beach – Hiroyuki Nakayama (lead technical sound designer); Kotaro Mori (lead sound programmer); Derrick Espino, Noburo Masuda, Alex Previty, Andres Herrera (sound design leads); Glen Gathard, Emile Mika, Stephen Schappler, Erick Ocampo (sound design supervisors); Maria Rascon, Ash Read, Pete Reed, Aaron Sanchez, Satsuki Sato, Robert Castro, Danny Hey, Juuso Tolonen, Nick Tomassetti, Lorenzo Valsassina, TJ Schauer, Tsubasa Ito, Chris Kokkinos (senior sound designers); Emiliyan Arnaudov, Danny Barboza, Edward Durcan, Goeun Lee Everett, David Goll, Rebecca Heathcote, Jason W. Jennings MPSE, Kei Matsuo, Federico Modanese, Chris Norrish, Daniel Ramos, Brad Reese, Charlie Ritter MPSE, Taiga Teshima, Minoru Tsuchihashi, Tim Walston, Yuji Yamagishi (sound designers); Nat Allam, Florian Titus Ardelean, Jamey Scott, Tom Holmes (sound editors); Joanna Fang, Blake Collins (senior foley artists); Austin Creek, Nick Seaman (foley editors)**; Battlefield 6 – Mari Saastamoinen Minto (senior audio director); Tom Hite, Nate Iske, David Jegutidse (audio directors); Jean Xu, Danijel Djuric, Mikael Grolander, Rasmus Thorup, Warren Post (lead sound designers); Oskar Eriksson, Gaëtan Lourmiere, Braeger Moore, Olivier Paschal, Goncalo Lopes Tavares (lead technical sound designers); Jeff Ballard, Adam Philp, Gavin Rouse, Ryan Salt, Sean Wilson, Clément Visseq, Axel Szelag (audio programmers); Nikola Lukić, Max McCoy (senior technical sound designers); Chris Burt, Drew Elder, Jack Sandall, Tom Wright, Alexis Marzin (senior sound designers); Tomas Bancroft, Briana Billups, Yanni Caldas, Mike Clarke, Will Dunn, Arvid Lundin, Rodrigo Ruiz Morales, Adam Viger, Dave Vitas, Bryan O. Watkins, Frédérik White, Heedo Woo, Felix Norton-Barsalou (sound designers); Albin Jansson, Aryo Nazaradeh, Thomas Parrish (technical sound designers); Dispatch – Diego Hodge (technical sound designer); Ranger Norton, Paul Ruskay (sound designers); Lazar Levine, Nick Mastroianni, Greg Sabitz (sound editors); Khayyam Mirza (audio artist); Zack Winlaw, Zack Alves (editors); Ghost of Yōtei – Brad Meyer (audio director); Byron Bullock, Adam Lidbetter (supervising sound editors); Apoorva Bansal, Krish Ragaratnam (audio programmers); Safar Bake, Jack Bell, Erik Buensuceso, Sam Day, Bob Kellough, Josh Lord, Mattwo Lupieri, David Philipp, Lorenzo Piani, Pete Reed, Flávia Taconi, Chris Walasek (sound designers); Grey Davenport (technical sound designer); Pete Hanson (sound effects editor); Chris Bolte, Jessie Chang, Jasper Corcoran (sound implementers); Blake Collins, Joanna Fang (senior foley editors); Jeric Chapman, Brianna Wing (audio QAs)

=== Student film ===
Outstanding Achievement in Sound Editing – Student Film (Verna Fields Award)
- **Oneiros (National Film and Television School) – Jingman Anita Xu (supervising sound editor)**
  - Carb Pot (Beijing Film Academy) – Chang Xuying, Ling Mei (supervising sound editors)
  - Damned (Savannah College of Art and Design) – James Michael Slukhinsky (supervising sound editor)
  - Dancing Spiders Play Jazz in Nooks (University of Michigan) – Renata Schmult (supervising sound editor)
  - A Darker Place: Cases from the DCA (Chapman University) – Evan Nowack (supervising sound editor)
  - El Corazón (National Film and Television School) – Will Henley (supervising sound editor)
  - Moksha (Netherlands Film Academy) – Faas Brester, Jan Verburg (supervising sound editors)
  - They Made You Into a Weapon and Told You to Find Peace (National Film and Television School) – Levi Giger (supervising sound editor)
