= I Have Friends Everywhere =

- Andor episode
- Cassian Andor (Diego Luna), in disguise as a fashion designer, discusses the Tarkin Massacre with hotel bellhop Thela (Stefan Crepon).
- Episode no.: Season 2 Episode 5
- Directed by: Ariel Kleiman
- Written by: Beau Willimon
- Cinematography by: Christophe Nuyens
- Editing by: John Gilroy
- Original release date: April 29, 2025
- Running time: 54 minutes

Guest appearances
- Anton Lesser as Major Partagaz; Kurt Egyiawan as Attendant Grymish; Richard Sammel as Carro Rylanz; Kathryn Hunter as Eedy Karn; Forest Whitaker as Saw Gerrera; Alaïs Lawson as Enza Rylanz; Ella Pellegrini as Dreena; Ewens Abid as Tazi; Abraham Wapler as Samm; Caroline Vanier as Leeza; Théo Costa-Marini as Dilan; Alex Skarbek as Capso

Episode chronology
← Previous "Ever Been to Ghorman?"	Next → "What a Festive Evening"

"I Have Friends Everywhere" is the fifth episode of the second season of the American science fiction political spy thriller drama television series Andor. It is the seventeenth episode of the series overall. It was written by Beau Willimon and directed by Ariel Kleiman.

The episode has four main storylines: Kleya's discovery that a bug of hers planted in Davo Sculdun's office may be found; Cassian's departure from Coruscant and contact with the Ghorman Front on Luthen's behalf; Syril's departure from Ghorman and contact with the ISB and his mother on Coruscant; and Wilmon's mission with Saw Gerrera's Partisans for Luthen. Other storylines include Bix grappling with her drug use in the safehouse after Cassian's departure, and the Ghorman Front's discovery of Syril's past on Morlana One. (Note: As depicted in the early episodes of season 1)

"I Have Friends Everywhere" was released on Disney+ on April 29, 2025 as part of a three-episode block including "Ever Been to Ghorman?" and "What a Festive Evening". It received positive reviews from critics. Forest Whitaker's performance as Saw in the episode was especially praised, and earned him an Outstanding Guest Actor in a Drama Series nomination at the 77th Primetime Creative Arts Emmy Awards.

== Plot ==
Cassian Andor visits a travel agency to acquire a disguise for his imminent trip to Ghorman. To alert the agency's proprietor to his affiliation with Luthen Rael, he tells her the Rebel code phrase "I have friends everywhere". He disguises himself as a fashion designer named Varian Skye and makes his way to Ghorman.

At the Bureau of Standards in Palmo, Syril Karn is startled by an ISB team invading his office in search of a listening device. He resists their entry, but is taken away to be interrogated. He later returns to the office and informs his subordinates that a listening device was found in his office. (Note: Planted by the Ghorman Front, first seen in "Ever Been to Ghorman?") Though he has been aware of the device, he pretends to be angry with the Imperials to avoid suspicion from the Ghorman Front.

Davo Sculdun learns that a piece in his collection of antiquities was forged and orders that every piece in the collection be inspected for reappraisal after the imminent Senate Investiture party. Unknown to him, Kleya Marki has been listening to the conversation through a microphone planted in another piece, which she fears will soon be discovered. She informs Luthen, and they plan to remove the bug at the party.

The Ghorman Front learns of Syril's past on Morlana One, with his dishonourable discharge adding to his credibility. Rylanz and Enza meet him in the street and ask that he provide details on the transports carrying weapons for the Imperial armory in the city.

Luthen visits Bix Caleen in the safehouse. They discuss Bix's difficulty adapting to life on Coruscant, as well as her drug use, which Luthen discourages.

Syril provides the Ghorman Front with data about the transports and departs to Coruscant for an ISB briefing. Meanwhile, Cassian arrives on Ghorman fully disguised, and checks into a hotel. He is brought to his room by a bellhop named Thela, with whom he discusses Grand Moff Tarkin's massacre of Ghorman citizens.

On Coruscant, Syril meets Dedra Meero in her apartment, before the two head to the ISB building to brief Partagaz on their recent developments. Partagaz praises Syril's work, much to his delight.

Cassian dines in a cafe in Palmo, where he is found by Enza. He criticizes her, and the Front, for being impatient and reckless. The next day, he visits the House of Rylanz to meet with Rylanz. He is informed of the plan to hijack the Imperial transports to prove the Empire has been building an armory, and determines it to be beyond the Front's capabilities.

On D'Qar, Wilmon continues to attempt teaching Saw's lieutenant Pluti how to work his rhydonium extraction device. Eventually, Pluti tells Saw he is ready, but needs to know the exact station the Partisans intend to target. Saw names a station, and tells Pluti that they plan to kill Wilmon soon. Wilmon and Pluti prepare to present the device to Saw, who pulls a gun on Wilmon. However, he uses the gun to shoot Pluti, who he has determined to be an Imperial spy. The Partisans leave D'Qar for good, and Wilmon is made to extract the rhydonium alone. Once he succeeds, Saw begins inhaling the gas to Wilmon's surprise. He tells Wilmon of his past and his motivations to rebel, convincing Wilmon to remove his mask and breathe the fumes in as well.

== Production ==
=== Writing ===
The episode was written by Beau Willimon, in his fifth writing credit for the show, and directed by Ariel Kleiman, after he directed the previous four episodes of the series. The episodes of Andor's second season, like those of its first, are split up into blocks, or story arcs, of three episodes. Unlike in season one, each arc begins one year after the previous episode. Series showrunner Tony Gilroy structured the season this way after concluding that the original five-season plan for the show was unfeasible, and needing some way to bridge the four years between season 1 and Rogue One (2016) in a single season. As proof of concept, he wrote the first and last episodes of each arc, and eventually decided on this structure for the season.

=== Casting ===
In "I Have Friends Everywhere", marking his second appearance on the second season of Andor, Forest Whitaker reprises his role as Saw Gerrera from previous Star Wars media, including Rogue One.

=== Music ===
The original score for "I Have Friends Everywhere" was composed by Nicholas Britell, the composer for the show's first season, with additional music by replacement composer Brandon Roberts.

The soundtrack for the episode was released alongside that of the other two episodes in its block on May 2, 2025 via Walt Disney Records as part of the second of four volumes of the second season's original score.

Andor Season 2: Episode 5 (Original Soundtrack)
No.	Title	Length
1.	"Andor (Main Title Theme) – Episode 5 (Note: Composed by Brandon Roberts; the track itself is an altered mix of the title theme for "The Eye")"	0:37
2.	"Ghorman Intel (Note: Composed by Roberts)"	1:06
3.	"Spider for Mom"	1:02
4.	"I Was There"	1:53
5.	"Varian Skye"	1:33
6.	"Turn Out the Lights"	0:41
7.	"Kafhaus Number 1"	2:54
8.	"House of Rylanz"	1:59
9.	"Palmo Recon"	1:11
10.	"Let It Run Wild"	2:03
Total length:		14:59

== Release ==
"I Have Friends Everywhere" was released on Disney+ on April 29, 2025 as part of a three-episode block, alongside "Ever Been to Ghorman?" and "What a Festive Evening".

== Reception ==
=== Critical response ===
The review aggregator website Rotten Tomatoes reports a 100% approval rating, based on 5 reviews.

William Hughes of The A.V. Club gave a positive review, writing "the fifth episode of Andor's second season spends the majority of its runtime in the sci-fi version of a highly reserved spy thriller, but it gives Saw the final word." Mike Redmond of Pajiba also gave a positive review, summarizing that "We should have had an entire glorious week of Saw Gerrara discourse based on Episode 5 alone!"

=== Accolades ===
Whitaker's performance in the episode was widely praised, especially for his speech to Wilmon in the final scene, and earned him an Outstanding Guest Actor in a Drama Series nomination at the 77th Primetime Creative Arts Emmy Awards.

Award	Year	Category	Recipient	Result	Ref.
American Society of Cinematographers	2026	Episode of a One-Hour Regular Series	Christophe Nuyens	Won (Note: Tied with Alex Disenhof for Task (Episode: "Crossings"))	
Creative Arts Emmy Awards	2025	Outstanding Guest Actor in a Drama Series	Forest Whitaker	Nominated	
