= Yan Miles =

American television and film editor

- Born: Shaftesbury, Dorset
- Occupation(s): Television and film editor
- Years active: 1999–present

Yan Miles, ACE, is an English television and film editor. He is best known for his work on the Netflix series The Crown and BBC Television series Sherlock.

Miles worked on five episodes of the Andor TV series, being rewarded by an Emmy Award for Outstanding Picture Editing for a Drama Series in 2025.

== Career ==
Yan began his career working for Stanley Long. Yan won his first Emmy award for the Nick Hurran directed Sherlock: His Last Vow in 2014. He is a member of the American Cinema Editors (ACE) and the British Film Editors (BFE). His latest project, the Netflix film Night Always Comes.

== Filmography ==
Year	Title	Contribution	Note
2025	Night Always Comes	Editor	Feature film
2022–2025	Andor	Editor	5 episodes
2024	William Tell	Editor	Feature film
2023	The Turkish Detective	Editor	2 episodes
2023	Sharper	Editor	Feature film
2020	Professor Longhair, Rugged & Funky	Editor and producer	Documentary
2020	White Lines	Editor	2 episodes
2016–2020	The Crown	Editor	6 episodes
2018	Press	Editor	3 episodes
2017	Oasis	Editor	Feature film
2014–2017	Sherlock	Editor	3 episodes
2016	Game of Thrones	Editor	1 episode
2016	Beowulf: Return to the Shieldlands	Editor	1 episode
2015	Childhood's End	Editor	3 episodes
2015	Fortitude	Editor	2 episodes
2011–2015	Strike Back	Editor	8 episodes
2013–2014	Endeavour	Editor	6 episodes
2013	Rock and Roll Fuck'n'Lovely	Editor and producer	Feature film
2012	The Missing	Editor	2 episodes
2011	Primeval	Editor	6 episodes
2009	The Prisoner	Editor	5 episodes
2005	Rome	Editor	1 episode
2002	Function at the Junction	Editor	Short film
2000	It's a Goat's Life	Editor	Short film
1999	Half-Life: Uplink	Editor	Short film

== Awards and nominations ==
Year	Result	Award	Category	Work	Ref.
2025	Won	Primetime Emmy Awards	Outstanding Picture Editing for a Drama Series	Andor (for "Who Are You?")	
2022	Won	Peabody Awards	Entertainment	Andor	
2021	Won	Primetime Emmy Awards	Outstanding Single-Camera Picture Editing for a Drama Series	The Crown	
2017	Nominated	American Cinema Editors	Best Edited One-Hour Series for Non-Commercial Television	The Crown	
2015	Won	American Cinema Editors	Best Edited One-Hour Series for Commercial Television	Sherlock	
2015	Won	British Academy Television Craft Awards	Best Editing: Fiction	Sherlock	
2014	Won	Primetime Emmy Awards	Outstanding Single-Camera Picture Editing for a Miniseries or a Movie	Sherlock (for "His Last Vow")	
