= Janus Metz Pedersen =

Danish film and television director (born 1974)

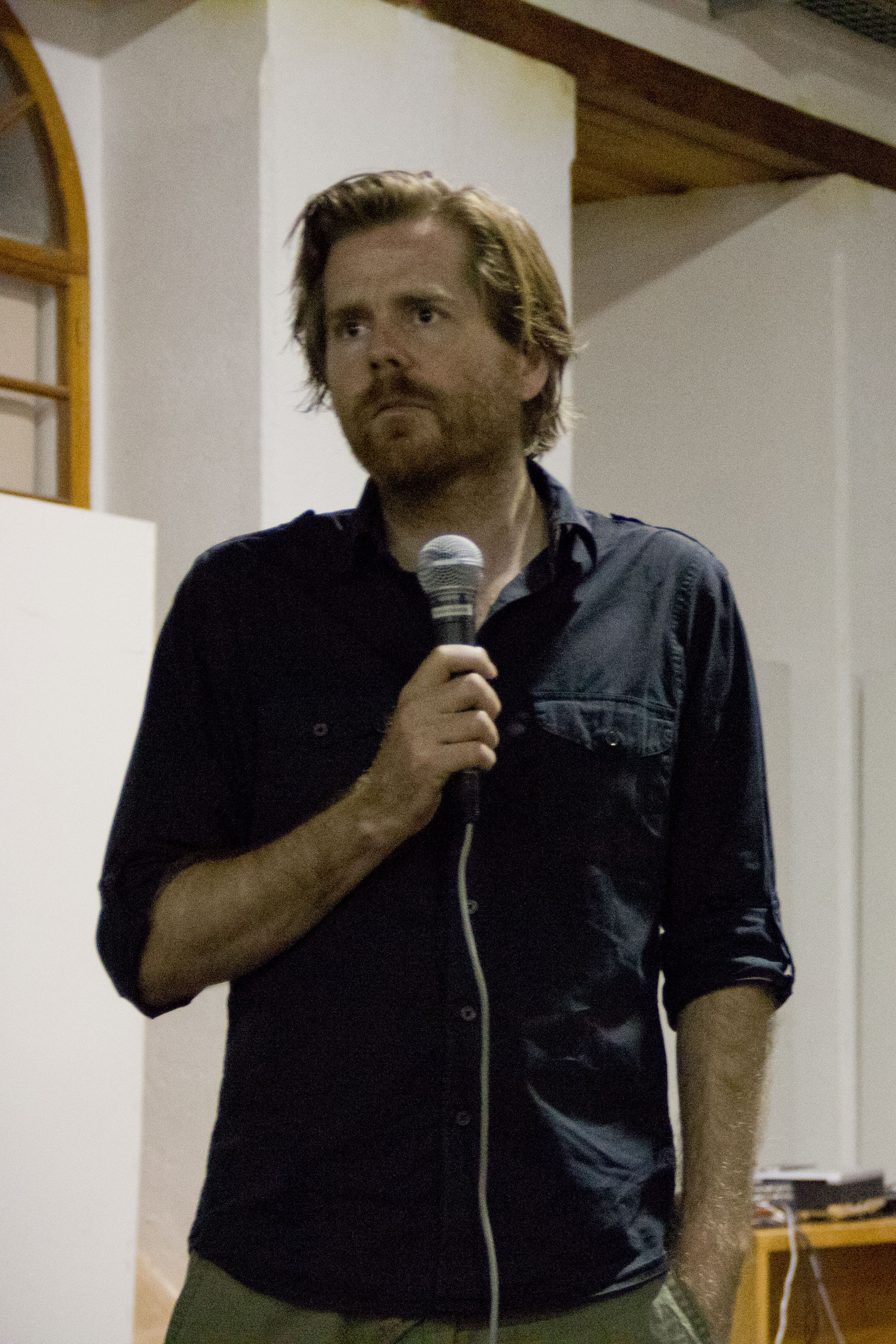
- Janus Metz in 2011.
- Born: 27 September 1974 (age 52)
- Occupations: Film and television director

Janus Metz Pedersen (born 27 September 1974) is a Danish film and television director. He is known for directing the films Armadillo (2010), Borg vs McEnroe (2017), and All the Old Knives (2022), as well as episodes of the miniseries ZeroZeroZero (2020) and the series Andor (2025), for which he was nominated for the Primetime Emmy Award for Outstanding Directing for a Drama Series.

== Work ==
Metz worked as a documentary researcher and moved to South Africa. There he worked on the television drama Soul City before making his debut documentary short Township Boys in 2006. His feature documentaries include Love on Delivery and Ticket to Paradise. These two films are a two-part series depicting women in a situation of mail-ordered brides from Vietnam and Thailand to Denmark.

In 2010, Pedersen directed Armadillo.

In 2015, Pedersen directed the third episode, "Maybe Tomorrow", of the second season of True Detective, starring Colin Farrell, Rachel McAdams, and Vince Vaughn.

Metz directed the 2017 film Borg vs McEnroe.

After this Metz returned to the documentaries by making Heartbound: A Different Kind of Love Story (2018) about more than 900 Thai women married to men in a small region of Denmark.

He directed three episodes of ZeroZeroZero, which premiered on Sky Atlantic, Italy, in February 2020.

He was the director of the Amazon production All the Old Knives, released in 2022, an American spy thriller film written by Olen Steinhauer.

In 2025, he directed three critically acclaimed episodes of the second season of Andor.

Metz is the director of the 2026 crime drama film Unabomber, based on the life of domestic terrorist Ted Kaczynski, starring Russell Crowe, Jacob Tremblay, Shailene Woodley, and Annabelle Wallis.

== Awards ==
- Winner at BFI London Film Festival, Cannes Film Festival, Critics' Choice Movie Award and Shaken's Stars.
- Official selection of Brisbane International Film Festival, Cleveland International Film Festival and Toronto International Film Festival.

== Works cited ==
- Lars Skree
- Armadillo (2010)
