= Syril Karn =

- Star Wars character
- Kyle Soller as Syril Karn
- First appearance: "Kassa"; Andor (2022)
- Last appearance: "Who Are You?"; Andor (2025)
- Portrayed by: Kyle Soller

In-universe information
- Species: Human
- Gender: Male
- Affiliation: Preox-Morlana; Galactic Empire; Imperial Bureau of Standards; Ghorman Front (spy)
- Family: Eedy Karn (mother); Unnamed father
- Significant other: Dedra Meero
- Homeworld: Coruscant

Syril Karn is a fictional character in the Star Wars franchise portrayed by Kyle Soller. The character was first introduced as a supporting antagonist in the television series Andor (2022-2025), the prequel to the feature film Rogue One (2016).

Syril Karn is a Preox-Morlana (Pre-Mor) security officer on Morlana One, starts investigating a murder of his two colleagues. After a tip from Ferrix, Syril starts hunting Cassian Andor.

Syril Karn received broadly positive reception from critics, with his character arc often being described as tragic.

== Creation ==
Syril actor Kyle Soller has expressed that through Syril, the character shows the banality of evil. That anyone who feels like an outsider and wants to be loved could be Syril. Syril is described by both Andor creator Tony Gilroy and Kyle Soller as a romantic fantasist, with Gilroy saying, "I think he could have just as equally gone in many different directions if he'd been shown any place that there was some love or some light."

== Character ==
=== Early life ===
Syril Karn was born on Coruscant to his mother Eedy Karn. His father abandoned the family.

=== Andor ===
==== Season 1 ====
Syril begins investigating a murder of two Pre-Mor security officers that took place on Morlana One. A tip from Timm Karlo names the suspect Cassian Jeron Andor on Ferrix. Syril and his team try to ambush Cassian and his associate Luthen Rael on Ferrix, which ends in failure. Instead, Andor and Rael are able to sneak up on Syril. Rael urges Andor to kill Syril, but Andor spares him. Andor and Rael manage to escape on a speeder while deploying a decoy with explosives. The explosives injure and kill multiple officers, which leaves Syril stunned. After failing his mission, Syril is summoned to a meeting with Supervisor Blevin, who oversees the Morlana sector. Blevin reprimands the Pre-Mor officers and states that all corporate security in the sector is to be dissolved. Syril, now fired, returns to his mother Eedy on Coruscant.

Due to a connection with an influential figure, Harlo, Syril is able to secure a job at the Imperial Bureau of Standards. Syril submits six false reports about Cassian Andor which catch the attention of Imperial Security Bureau (ISB) Supervisor Dedra Meero. Meero interrogates Syril, during which he reveals the name of Cassian Andor and informs her that he didn't read the report Blevin forced him to sign. Meero gives him the report so he can correct it. Syril helps Meero by giving more details regarding the incident. Following this, Meero informs the Imperial Bureau of Standards that Syril is of service to the Empire. Soon after, Syril receives a promotion. Syril goes outside the ISB headquarters to thank Meero, believing she is the reason for his promotion. Meero replies, stating she isn't responsible for it. Meero starts to believe Syril is stalking her and warns him not to pursue this any further.

A previous colleague at the Pre-Mor Enforcement named Linus Mosk calls Syril and informs him that Andor's mother, Maarva Carassi Andor, has died. They conclude that Andor is likely to return for his mother's funeral. Syril leaves for Ferrix and meets up with Mosk. The tension between the people of Ferrix and the Empire is high. This leads to a riot during the funeral. Meero, who is on the planet, is dragged across the ground by rioters without any security able to help. Syril grabs Dedra and takes her to an abandoned warehouse. Meero says that she should thank him. Syril responds that she doesn't need to.

==== Season 2 ====
Syril is stationed on Ghorman in a Bureau of Standards field office. He has been planted there by his partner Meero to infiltrate the Ghorman Front, an anti-Imperial rebel group. Soon enough, Syril is contacted by the Ghorman Front and he successfully deceives them into believing he is a rebel sympathiser. Syril intentionally leaks military transport schedules to the Ghorman Front so they can perform a heist. This is part of the ISB's plan to justify a stronger Imperial presence on the planet.

Syril heads to Palmo Plaza where a large Ghor crowd is beginning to form. Syril begins to grow suspicious of what their true reason for being on Ghorman is. He confronts Meero, asking what the true purpose of them being here is. Meero tries to shut him down but Syril grabs her by the throat and demands to know the truth. Meero admits they are here for a mineral on the planet. Syril decides to leave and enter the Ghor crowd. Eventually the Imperial troops start to open fire on the crowd. Amidst the chaos, Syril spots Andor who is trying to assassinate Meero. Syril charges forward at Andor and starts a fistfight. Syril is able to take Andor's blaster and points it at him. Andor asks who he is. Syril hesitates slightly before being shot by Carro Rylanz, leader of the Ghorman Front.

== Reception ==
Syril Karn received broadly positive reception from critics, though to a lesser extent than other characters. The character's death is regarded as one of the highlights of his character arc. Lucas Kloberdanz-Dyck of Collider described the character as "might not be every fan's favorite character, but he is still incredibly interesting, well-written, and vital to the story".

Kelcie Mattson of Collider described the character as a "divisive figure", "somewhere between compelling and annoying". Jeremy Mathai of /film described the character as having "one of the most fascinating arcs throughout the entire story". Evan Romano of Men's Health said the character was a "horrifying example of someone who could've been normal, but got sucked into believing in something and never found his way out.".
