= Dedra Meero =

Fictional character from Andor

- Star Wars character
- Denise Gough as Dedra Meero
- First appearance: "Aldhani"; Andor (2022)
- Last appearance: "Jedha, Kyber, Erso"; Andor (2025)
- Portrayed by: Denise Gough

In-universe information
- Species: Human
- Gender: Female
- Occupation: ISB Supervisor
- Affiliation: Galactic Empire; Imperial Security Bureau
- Significant other: Syril Karn
- Homeworld: Coruscant

Dedra Meero is a fictional character in the Star Wars franchise portrayed by Denise Gough. The character was first introduced as the main antagonist in the television series Andor (2022-2025), the prequel to the feature film Rogue One (2016).

Raised in an Imperial kinderblock, Dedra Meero grows up to become an Imperial Security Bureau (ISB) Supervisor. After a series of incidents, she suspects that a rebel network is forming and begins hunting an individual code-named Axis and his associate, Cassian Andor. Dedra is assigned to the Ghorman project unwillingly by Orson Krennic. Dedra is successful on the Ghorman project, which results in the death of her partner, Syril Karn. Dedra identifies Axis as Luthen Rael and confronts him. Dedra is later arrested for possessing classified files relating to the Death Star. At the end of the series, she is shown in a prison.

The character received broad praise from critics, with her ending being highlighted as a fitting fate for her character.

== Creation ==
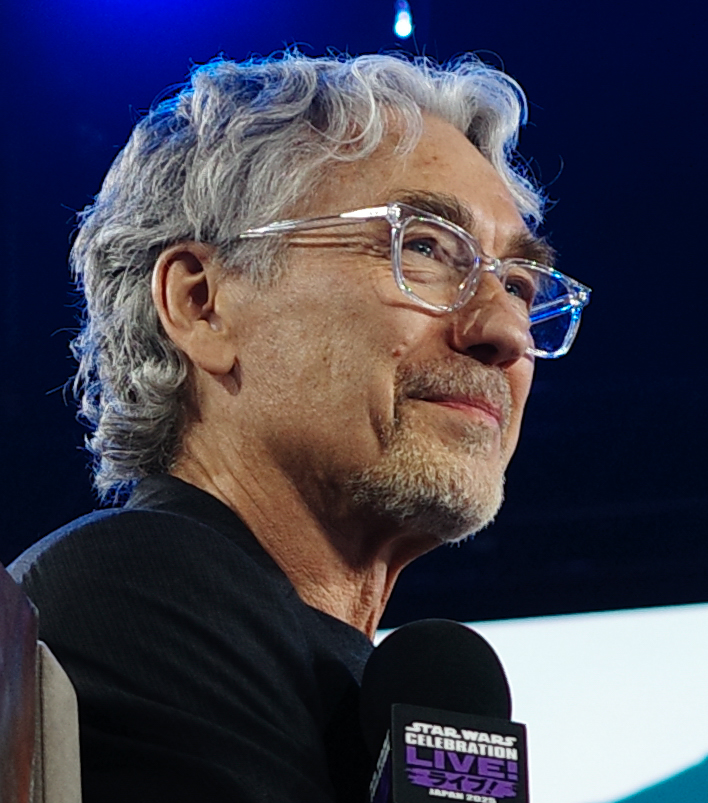
Andor creator Tony Gilroy in 2025

Andor creator Tony Gilroy stated that he intentionally made it easy to root for Dedra. He wanted the audience to emphasise with Dedra due to her working her way up through a male-dominated environment.

The writers of the show were "cheering" for Dedra until writing the Ferrix scenes. Gilroy said that "You’re writing her and rooting for her and then you get to Ferrix, and you go, “Oh.”".

In the early development of Andor, there was a planned episode focusing on young Dedra and how she grew up in the Imperial-Kinder-block, with Gilroy calling the upbringing "twisted". Gough said they were able to capture her "twisted" upbringing in one line in the episode "Harvest", the line being, "I grew up in an Imperial-Kinder-block." Gough said about the line, "There you go. Now you understand everything. She grew up with no touch, no love, no care, nothing. She grew up in a regime." Gough explained that there would have been a lot of abuse in Kinder-block. She says that Dedra had a "life of love being withheld" and that the closest thing to love Dedra experiences is being in control.

Gilroy revealed that once they had created Narkina 5 for the first Season, Gilroy knew that was the fate Dedra would get. Gough says "It's important that a character like her has consequences", and added "You want to play sides of her that elicit empathy from the audience, but not to the point where you completely forgive." Gough called Dedra's ending "gratifying".

=== Casting and portrayal ===
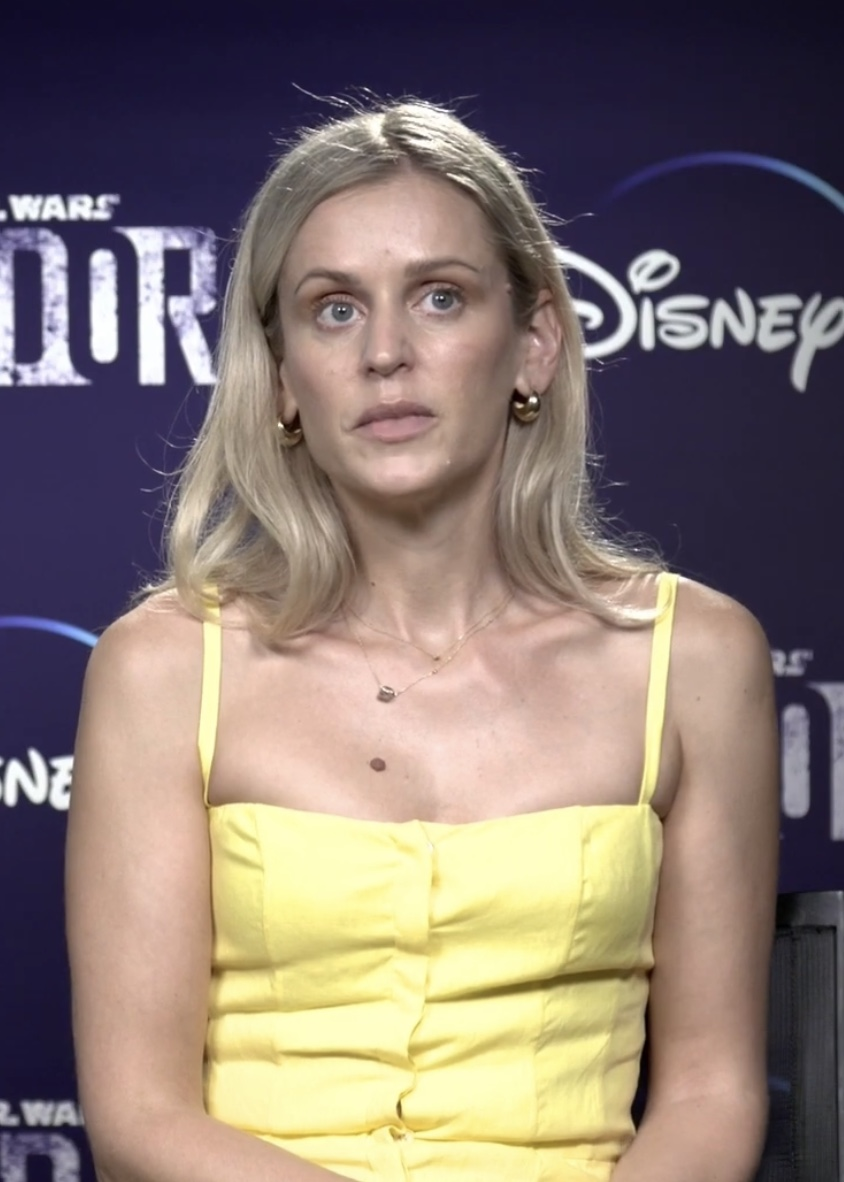
Gough in 2022

Gilroy had seen Gough in theater. He thought Gough would be perfect for the role of Dedra. Gough was concerned about not knowing much about Star Wars, but Gilroy didn't think that would be an issue. After reading the scripts for the first three episodes, Gough said she thought the scripts were "Magic" and wanted to know more. After a debrief with Gilroy, Gough confirmed she wanted the role.

Gough familiarised herself with Gilroy's work, but did not watch all of Star Wars, saying that she only watched Rogue One. Gough said, "I don’t want to have too much information", and that, "I just want to play this woman, and then see what happens." She did not "want to be doing a version of something".

Gough describes Dedra as the antithesis of Luthen Rael. Gough explains that "She’s sacrificed everything. She doesn’t have friends. She doesn’t have a life. She’s prepared to be despised." and adding "Everything is iced out. Everything. Luthen burns it – there’s an energy to that. But Dedra’s is just as painful. She’s frozen everything."

Gough revealed that she was inspired by Giancarlo Esposito's Breaking Bad character, Gustavo Fring, when playing Dedra, and added that she "stole" the "steely elegance" from Jennifer Connelly's character, Melanie Cavill, in Snowpiercer.

== Character ==
=== Early life ===
Dedra is born to criminal parents on the planet Coruscant. She was later placed in a facility that would become an Imperial-Kinder-block at the age of three after her parents were arrested.

=== Andor ===
==== Season 1 ====
Dedra first appears in the fourth episode "Aldhani". She tries to gain authority over a Ferrix incident involving a Starpath unit because it was stolen from her sector. Her colleague, Supervisor Blevin, who oversees the Morlana sector, denies her authority over the incident. She suspects a rebel network is forming, but her colleagues and superiors doubt her claim due to the lack of evidence. Following the Aldhani heist, Dedra uses the Imperial Emergency Act to collect data from sectors outside her jurisdiction without official sanction. Major Lio Partagaz, leader of the ISB Board, reassigns the Morlana sector to Dedra after determining it has become a distraction for Blevin. Dedra interrogates Syril Karn after he submits six reports on Cassian Andor. Later, Dedra requests additional resources to hunt down Cassian Andor along with an individual code-named "Axis" whose real identity is Luthen Rael.

Dedra goes to Ferrix to a former hotel that has been converted into a garrison. There she interrogates Bix Caleen with the help of Doctor Gorst to identify Rael, whom Caleen is an acquaintance of. On her way to work the next day, Dedra is stopped by Karn. He thanks her, believing she is the reason he received a promotion. Dedra believes he is stalking her and threatens to have him imprisoned if he pursues it any further.

During a recorded speech by Maarva Andor for her funeral, Vanis Tigo, an Imperial captain, knocks down the droid B2EMO, which is broadcasting the speech. This angers the crowd and eventually causes a riot. Dedra is unprepared while trying to locate Andor. Dedra is attacked and thrown to the ground. While trying to retrieve her blaster, she is lifted up and taken into a warehouse by Karn. Dedra is stunned and tells Karn that she should thank him. Karn responds by saying there is no need to.

==== Season 2 ====
At the start of the first episode of the second season, "One Year Later", Dedra attends a secret Imperial meeting at the Maltheen Divide. During the meeting, Director Orson Callan Krennic presents an Imperial plan to take over Ghorman to acquire kalkite. The mining process could render the planet unstable. The plan includes a propaganda campaign to damage Ghorman's reputation to avoid galactic sympathy and to justify military crackdowns. Dedra is unsatisfied with the plan and tells Krennic that they need to cause an insurgency.

Dedra plants her now partner, Syril Karn, to be put in charge of the Imperial Bureau of Standards Field office on Ghorman. Karn is contacted by the Ghorman Front, an anti-Imperial rebel group. Dedra uses Karn to give information about classified military shipments with the intention of giving the Ghorman Front access to more weapons to justify a stronger Imperial presence. Dedra goes to Ghorman herself to oversee the final stages of her operation. The Ghorman Front has now organised a crowd in Palmo Plaza. Imperial forces start to surround the Plaza. Karn, realising what is about to happen, confronts Dedra. Karn is frustrated with Dedra for not telling him the true reason for his placement at Ghorman. Dedra argues this would happen with or without them and that they will return home as heroes. Karn leaves and goes into the crowd in the Plaza. After an order from Dedra, an Imperial sniper shoots one of the control officers, killing the officer. This causes Imperial forces to open fire on the Ghor crowd. Dedra, unaware that Cassian Andor is trying to assassinate her, unsuccessfully tries to locate Karn. Following the massacre, Dedra has a breakdown, knowing Karn is likely dead.

Dedra now returns to her search for Axis and is able to locate him because of classified files that were accidentally given to her office. From these files, Dedra is able to deduce that Axis is Luthen Rael. Dedra confronts him alone while having a team surrounding his gallery. Due to this mistake, Rael has time to attempt suicide. Rael is taken to hospital and later killed by his assistant Kleya Marki to prevent the Empire from gaining any further information. At the hospital, Dedra is arrested by her previous assistant, Avril Heert, who is now himself a Supervisor. The files Dedra had received contains not only a description of Rael, but also highly classified information relating to the Death Star. Dedra is confronted by Krennic in an ISB interrogation room. He reveals to Dedra that her colleague, Supervisor Lonni Jung, had logged into her files the day before and likely leaked them to the rebels. Dedra tries to defend herself by stating that she only acquired these files to find Axis. Krennic criticises Dedra for confronting Rael on her own, and states that if she is not a rebel spy, she missed her calling. Dedra, now in a cell, is approached by Supervisor Heert for advice on locating Marki. Dedra advises that they track her location through the use of fractal radio.

In one of the last scenes of the series finale "Jedha, Kyber, Erso", it is revealed that Dedra has been placed in a prison similar to the one Cassian Andor experienced in Season 1.

== Other appearances ==
Dedra appears in an Andor DLC for Lego Star Wars: The Skywalker Saga. Dedra appears in Star Wars: Galaxy of Heroes after a 2026 update. Dedra appears in Monopoly: Star Wars Heroes vs. Villains on the Villain side.

== Reception ==
Dedra Meero received broad praise from critics. Lucas Kloberdanz-Dyck of Collider described Dedra as "perhaps the most interesting character in the series, breaking the typical Empire stereotypes by showing initiative, drive, awareness, and humility." Chris Tilly of Dexerto had a similar view, calling her "one of the most fascinating new figures" in the Star Wars franchise.

Jenna Wrenn of Comicbook.com described Dedra as one of the "profoundly tragic and complex villains" in Star Wars, noting the character's fate as "the epitome of poetic justice". Rachel Leishman of The Mary Sue described the character's "rise and fall" as "fascinating and surprising", while calling her ending "satisfying". Tom Chapman of Den of Geek wrote that Dedra's imprisonment is "ironic" due to her presumably contributing to building the Death Star, while also describing her arc as "tragic". Andres Alvarez of Cinelinx wrote that the character was a "perfect example" of White Feminism.
