= Brandon Roberts (composer) =

American composer (born 1976)

- Roberts in 2026
- Born: 1976 (age 49–50); Carmel-by-the-Sea, California, U.S.
- Education: University of Southern California
- Occupation: Composer
- Style: Film score
- Website: brandonrobertsmusic.com

Brandon Roberts (born 1976) is an American composer for film and television. He, along with Marco Beltrami, won the Creative Arts Emmy Award for Outstanding Music Composition for a Documentary Series or Special (Original Score) for Free Solo (2018). He also collaborated with Beltrami on the CBS All Access series The Twilight Zone (2019–2020). He also composed the score for the 2018 film Unbroken: Path to Redemption. In 2025, he composed the original score for the second season of Andor, taking over scoring duties from fellow composer Nicholas Britell; Roberts was nominated for the 2025 Primetime Emmy Award for Outstanding Music Composition for a Series (Original Dramatic Score).

He is from Carmel-by-the-Sea, California and attended the University of Southern California.

== Select discography ==
- Sea of Fear (2006)
- The Thing (2011) – additional music
- The Wolverine (2013) – additional music
- The Woman in Black: Angel of Death (2014)
- The Axe Murders of Villisca (2016)
- Logan (2017) – additional music
- Little Evil (2017)
- Unbroken: Path to Redemption (2018)
- Free Solo (2018) – additional music
- Underwater (2020)
- The Way I See It (2020)
- Black Box (2020)
- Chaos Walking (2021)
- Fear Street Part Two: 1978 (2021)
- On a Wing and a Prayer (2023)
- Pet Sematary: Bloodlines (2023)
- Thanksgiving (2023)
- Land of Bad (2024)
- Clown in a Cornfield (2025)
- Andor (2025, season 2)
- Forgive Us All (2025)
- Ice Cream Man (2026)
- Behemoth! (2026)
