= Clark's Place =

- The Americans episode
- Episode no.: Season 4 Episode 5
- Directed by: Noah Emmerich
- Written by: Peter Ackerman
- Cinematography by: Alex Nepomniaschy
- Editing by: Amanda Pollack
- Production code: BDU405
- Original air date: April 13, 2016
- Running time: 49 minutes

Guest appearances
- Kelly AuCoin as Pastor Tim; Daniel Flaherty as Matthew Beeman; Peter Mark Kendall as Hans; Ruthie Ann Miles as Young Hee Seong; David Anzuelo as Father Rivas; Suzy Jane Hunt as Alice; Boris Krutonog as Igor Burov; Polly Lee as Joan; Frank Langella as Gabriel

Episode chronology
← Previous "Chloramphenicol"	Next → "The Rat"
- The Americans season 4

"Clark's Place" is the fifth episode of the fourth season of the American period spy drama television series The Americans. It is the 44th overall episode of the series and was written by co-producer Peter Ackerman, and directed by main cast member Noah Emmerich. It was released on FX on April 13, 2016.

The series is set during the Cold War and follows Elizabeth and Philip Jennings, two Soviet KGB intelligence officers posing as an American married couple living in Falls Church, a Virginia suburb of Washington, D.C., with their American-born children Paige and Henry. It also explores the conflict between Washington's FBI office and the KGB Rezidentura there, from the perspectives of agents on both sides, including the Jennings' neighbor Stan Beeman, an FBI agent working in counterintelligence. In the episode, Philip tries to help Martha with her problem, while Oleg is informed of Nina's death.

According to Nielsen Media Research, the episode was seen by an estimated 0.89 million household viewers and gained a 0.3 ratings share among adults aged 18–49. The episode received critical acclaim, with critics praising the episode's tension, writing and performances.

== Plot ==
Philip (Matthew Rhys) meets with Martha (Alison Wright) at Clark's place, explaining he had an emergency and couldn't reach her. Martha tells him that the FBI is closing in on her, having noted that William's surveillance record was copied. To help her, he gives her a new number to call him, which he will definitely check.

In Russia, Oleg (Costa Ronin) is informed of Nina's death by Igor (Boris Krutonog), devastating him. When Oleg blames his father for not even helping her or his brother, Igor suggests he could go back to America. They later attend Yevgeny's funeral, but Igor is forced to fire his gun in the air when he is not given a military funeral. Afterwards, he returns to the Rezidentura, where he reports Nina's death to Arkady (Lev Gorn). However, Arkady is not sympathetic, deeming that it was Nina's fault. He later informs Stan (Noah Emmerich), who shares his feeling of devastation.

Philip and Elizabeth (Keri Russell) meet with Pastor Tim (Kelly AuCoin) and Alice (Suzy Jane Hunt). They bring a Salvadoran priest, Father Rivas (David Anzuelos), who relates that Philip and Elizabeth helped him during the Salvadoran Civil War. This makes Tim change his perception of the Jennings, unaware that the priest is actually lying. Meanwhile, Elizabeth continues spending time with Young Hee (Ruthie Ann Miles), getting more involved in her personal life.

Philip shares his concerns with Gabriel (Frank Langella), fearing that Martha's cover will be blown. Gabriel tells him to continue the operation, claiming he has everything under control. Philip then calls Martha through the new phone line, promising to meet her soon. Finding that Henry (Keidrich Sellati) is spending more time with Stan, Philip decides to visit him and reconcile. Stan is not happy with Philip hanging out with Sandra, but eventually accepts his apology as he considers him "a good guy." Stan then leaves to surveil Martha with Aderholt (Brandon J. Dirden), with Philip meeting Aderholt in the process. Philip recognizes him as the person who took Martha to dine, while Elizabeth also recognizes him from a previous encounter. They proceed to have sex, while Stan and Aderholt stand outside Martha's apartment.

== Production ==
=== Development ===
In March 2016, FX confirmed that the fifth episode of the season would be titled "Clark's Place", and that it would be written by co-producer Peter Ackerman, and directed by main cast member Noah Emmerich. This was Ackerman's fourth writing credit, and Emmerich's second directing credit.

=== Filming ===
Filming for the episode started on December 4, 2015 and wrapped by December 9, 2015.

== Reception ==
=== Viewers ===
In its original American broadcast, "Clark's Place" was seen by an estimated 0.89 million household viewers with a 0.3 in the 18-49 demographics. This means that 0.3 percent of all households with televisions watched the episode. This was a 15% decrease in viewership from the previous episode, which was watched by 1.04 million household viewers with a 0.3 in the 18-49 demographics.

=== Critical reviews ===
"Clark's Place" received critical acclaim. The review aggregator website Rotten Tomatoes reported an 100% approval rating for the episode, based on 15 reviews. The site's consensus states: "'Clark's Place' heightens the tension of this season's arc with the first fallout from a shocking death - further underscoring the reality that no character is safe."

Eric Goldman of IGN gave the episode a "great" 8.8 out of 10 and wrote in his verdict, "The final montage sequence of this episode was pretty unsubtle with its song choice, and I have to say 'Under Pressure,' awesome though it may be, is also a pretty overplayed song at this point, used in many other films and series. But on the other hand, subtle or no, that song is certainly true to what's happening here, as all these characters are barely hanging on by a thread. Nina's death only underlines the stakes at play here, and just how tenuous everyone's position is on The Americans and how it can all be taken away very quickly."

Erik Adams of The A.V. Club gave the episode a "B+" grade and wrote, "'Clark's Place' isn't The Americans recoiling from the attack. It's the preparation for the pounce, the show's muscles tensing in preparation for action. What is it that Gabriel says? 'It's excruciating not to make a move when things are uncertain. We are people of action.' 'Clark's Place' draws suspense from that sense, but left me feeling a little like Philip in the parking garage: Desiring action when the situation calls for pause."

Alan Sepinwall of HitFix wrote, "Really, anything can happen with anyone at this point, and very little of it good. (Even Stan is more or less ruined whenever it comes out that his neighbor and best friend was a KGB illegal.) I can't predict the future on this show, but Nina's death has once again reminded us of the stakes of it all." Anthony Breznican of Entertainment Weekly wrote, "“Clark” owes Martha an apology. 'Where have you been for the last two days?' she asks. He can't tell her he was holed up in his handler's apartment with his wife undergoing antibiotic treatment to stave off a potential bio-weapons infection. So he gives her the typical, vague 'something came up' excuse."

Mike Hale of The New York Times wrote, "What's a good guy to do when the innocent woman he pretends to love puts him in danger? We'll find out soon." Genevieve Koski of Vulture gave the episode a 4 star rating out of 5 and wrote, "Given that we're only a week out from the series' most shocking death, it seems imprudent to return once more to speculating about Poor Martha's fate. But 'Clark's Place' puts none too fine a point on the imminence of Martha's doom unless circumstances change drastically for her, and quickly."

Ben Travers of IndieWire gave the episode an "A–" grade and wrote, "Be it the moral struggles of Paige or Martha, uncertainty and urgency aren't created by holding anything back, but by putting it all out there in the moment." Matt Brennan of Slant Magazine wrote, "'Clark's Place,' directed by Noah Emmerich, establishes the rifts in the show's key relationships through a series of skillful compositions, highlighting the spaces in between the characters at every turn."

Alec Bojalad of Den of Geek gave the episode a 3.5 star rating out of 5 and wrote, "After 'Clark's Place,' it's clear that in the writer's room of The Americans, there was a cassette tape with a white label marked 'Under Pressure,' sitting behind glass with a small hammer dangling from a string next to it and the text 'Break Glass In Case of Slow Episode.'" Amy Amatangelo of Paste gave the episode a 9.6 out of 10 and wrote, "The series has always had impossibly high stakes. But this season has a sense of impending doom that feels unprecedented. There is nowhere for the Jennings to turn as the walls are closing in. Now that the show has killed off Nina, we are reminded of the fact that any character can die at any time. My clearly false sense of security that perhaps fan favorite characters were safe has been obliterated. Queen's often overused song "Under Pressure", which closed out the episode, has never seemed so fitting."
