= Experimental Prototype City of Tomorrow =

- The Americans episode
- Episode no.: Season 4 Episode 3
- Directed by: Kevin Dowling
- Written by: Stephen Schiff
- Cinematography by: Alex Nepomniaschy
- Editing by: Sheri Bylander
- Production code: BDU403
- Original air date: March 30, 2016
- Running time: 44 minutes

Guest appearances
- Michael Aronov as Anton Baklanov; Kelly AuCoin as Pastor Tim; Brandon J. Dirden as Agent Dennis Aderholt; Ruthie Ann Miles as Young Hee Seong; Susan Misner as Sandra Beeman; Anthony Arkin as Stavos; Rob Yang as Don Seong; Margo Martindale as Claudia; Frank Langella as Gabriel

Episode chronology
← Previous "Pastor Tim"	Next → "Chloramphenicol"
- The Americans season 4

"Experimental Prototype City of Tomorrow" is the third episode of the fourth season of the American period spy drama television series The Americans. It is the 42nd overall episode of the series and was written by co-executive producer Stephen Schiff, and directed by Kevin Dowling. It was released on FX on March 30, 2016.

The series is set during the Cold War and follows Elizabeth and Philip Jennings, two Soviet KGB intelligence officers posing as an American married couple living in Falls Church, a Virginia suburb of Washington, D.C., with their American-born children Paige and Henry. It also explores the conflict between Washington's FBI office and the KGB Rezidentura there, from the perspectives of agents on both sides, including the Jennings' neighbor Stan Beeman, an FBI agent working in counterintelligence. In the episode, Philip and Elizabeth meet with Pastor Tim, while Gabriel settles on a plan to get rid of their problem.

According to Nielsen Media Research, the episode was seen by an estimated 0.82 million household viewers and gained a 0.2 ratings share among adults aged 18–49. The episode received critical acclaim, with critics praising the performances, writing, and ending.

== Plot ==
Philip (Matthew Rhys) and Elizabeth (Keri Russell) meet with Pastor Tim (Kelly AuCoin) at his office, explaining that they "fight for justice." They warn him not to tell anyone for the sake of their family, although they make him confess that he told his wife about it.

Philip and Elizabeth visit Gabriel (Frank Langella) to give him the vial. They report their meeting, debating over fleeing the country, because they cannot kill Tim as it will damage their relationship with Paige (Holly Taylor). Philip tells Paige about Tim revealing their secret, which disappoints Paige as she felt she could trust him. He advises her in maintaining a good relationship with Tim. After talking with Claudia (Margo Martindale), Gabriel informs them of the new plan: the Jennings will go to a vacation trip in Epcot, while Tim and his wife will be killed by KGB agents and make it appear like an accident. Philip is conflicted, but Elizabeth supports the decision. To make it appear more natural, they leave a pamphlet in the kitchen, which is found by Henry (Keidrich Sellati), who suggests the trip.

In prison, Nina (Annet Mahendru) is informed that she was found guilty of her charges, despite the lack of a trial, and she is facing a possible execution. While sleeping, she dreams of reuniting with Stan (Noah Emmerich) at their safe house. Back in America, Elizabeth goes undercover at a Mary Kay party, where she befriends a woman, Young Hee Seong (Ruthie Ann Miles), a sales representative. She goes selling door-to-door with Young Hee, and then attends a dinner at her house, where she meets her husband, Don Seong (Rob Yang).

Sandra (Susan Misner) visits Philip at his house, during which Philip seizes the moment to mention that he confessed to Elizabeth about attending EST sessions and that Stan fought with him, hoping to fix his relationship. Stan, meanwhile, suspects Martha (Alison Wright) is hiding something, and asks Agent Aderholt (Brandon J. Dirden) to help him by distracting her while he searches her apartment. Unaware to them, their encounter is overheard due to the bug planted in the Mail Robot.

During their next meeting with Gabriel, Philip and Elizabeth find him on the floor, severely coughing. Realizing he may have contracted glanders, they hurriedly meet with William (Dylan Baker). Realizing they contracted it, William flees, only to be caught by Philip, who spits on him to get infected. William is forced to take them to his apartment, where he provides antibiotics for them and Gabriel. William states that they must quarantine themselves in Gabriel's apartment for 36 hours, as well as taking doses every 6 hours. This forces the Jennings to cancel their Epcot trip.

== Production ==
=== Development ===
In February 2016, FX confirmed that the third episode of the season would be titled "Experimental Prototype City of Tomorrow", and that it would be written by co-executive producer Stephen Schiff, and directed by Kevin Dowling. This was Schiff's fifth writing credit, and Dowling's fourth directing credit.

=== Filming ===
Filming for the episode wrapped by November 16, 2015.

== Reception ==
=== Viewers ===
In its original American broadcast, "Experimental Prototype City of Tomorrow" was seen by an estimated 0.82 million household viewers with a 0.2 in the 18-49 demographics. This means that 0.2 percent of all households with televisions watched the episode. This was a 12% decrease in viewership from the previous episode, which was watched by 0.93 million household viewers with a 0.3 in the 18-49 demographics.

=== Critical reviews ===
"Experimental Prototype City of Tomorrow" received critical acclaim. The review aggregator website Rotten Tomatoes reported an 100% approval rating for the episode, based on 16 reviews. The site's consensus states: "Welcome comic relief, plot developments leaving the central characters' future further in doubt, and an appearance by Margo Martindale make 'Experimental Prototype City of Tomorrow' an integral transitional episode."

Erik Adams of The A.V. Club gave the episode a "B+" grade and wrote, "'Experimental Prototype City Of Tomorrow' is more than its last eight minutes. It's also The Americans episode that gives the most serious consideration to extracting the Jennings from Falls Church."

Alan Sepinwall of HitFix wrote, "When the fourth season premiered, the Glanders vial in the tobacco tin sure seemed like an apt metaphor for all that was happening in Philip and Elizabeth's life. In 'Experimental Prototype City of Tomorrow,' the sample appears to break open, at least enough to infect Gabriel, while at the same time it feels like the plague of their secret is finally getting ready to open up and destroy everything around them." Anthony Breznican of Entertainment Weekly wrote, "This episode is all about the way we project a future for ourselves, existing in possibilities, imagining destinations, and then slamming face-first into the inescapable present."

Mike Hale of The New York Times wrote, "Has there ever been a television character as hard to kill off as Pastor Tim of The Americans? On Wednesday night, for the second week in a row, his ticket was ready to be punched. But once again he was saved at the last minute — saved by, of all things, the glanders virus, which appears to have escaped its bottle, infected Gabriel and forced Elizabeth and Philip into an informal quarantine." Genevieve Koski of Vulture gave the episode a perfect 5 star rating out of 5 and wrote, "As with the Jennings, Nina is facing down a terrifying unknown. But unlike them, she doesn't seem to have any plan to escape that terrifying unknown. Even a bad plan is better than no plan at all, right?"

Ben Travers of IndieWire gave the episode a "B+" grade and wrote, "If Paige sought solace from Pastor Tim, it's certainly plausible to imagine Henry sharing his concerns with Stan. So, one way or another, Mama and Papa Jennings need to get home soon." Matt Brennan of Slant Magazine wrote, "With 'Experimental Prototype City of Tomorrow,' The Americans examines the transformation of such high ideals into imperfect realities."

Alec Bojalad of Den of Geek gave the episode a 4 star rating out of 5 and wrote, "The Americans is one of those aforementioned superior pieces of art and in 'Experimental Prototype City of Tomorrow' it commits some alchemy of its own. As if The Americans needed another literary device to prove its excellence, the show takes four tickets to Disney World and turns them into a death sentence for two innocent people." Amy Amatangelo of Paste gave the episode a 9.6 out of 10 and wrote, "EPCOT stands for Experimental Prototype Community of Tomorrow, a slight variation of the episode title. As Philip and Elizabeth contemplate visiting the community of tomorrow, everyone's future is bleak."
