= Chloramphenicol (The Americans) =

- The Americans episode
- Episode no.: Season 4 Episode 4
- Directed by: Stefan Schwartz
- Written by: Tracey Scott Wilson
- Cinematography by: Alex Nepomniaschy
- Editing by: Daniel Valverde
- Production code: BDU404
- Original air date: April 6, 2016
- Running time: 43 minutes

Guest appearances
- Michael Aronov as Anton Baklanov; Brandon J. Dirden as Agent Dennis Aderholt; Boris Krutonog as Igor Burov; Polly Lee as Joan; Frank Langella as Gabriel

Episode chronology
← Previous "Experimental Prototype City of Tomorrow"	Next → "Clark's Place"
- The Americans season 4

"Chloramphenicol" is the fourth episode of the fourth season of the American period spy drama television series The Americans. It is the 43rd overall episode of the series and was written by Tracey Scott Wilson, and directed by Stefan Schwartz. It was released on FX on April 6, 2016.

The series is set during the Cold War and follows Elizabeth and Philip Jennings, two Soviet KGB intelligence officers posing as an American married couple living in Falls Church, a Virginia suburb of Washington, D.C., with their American-born children Paige and Henry. It also explores the conflict between Washington's FBI office and the KGB Rezidentura there, from the perspectives of agents on both sides, including the Jennings' neighbor Stan Beeman, an FBI agent working in counterintelligence.

In the episode, Philip and Elizabeth are forced to quarantine with Gabriel and William, while Nina awaits her sentence. Meanwhile, Martha is targeted by Stan and Aderholt.

According to Nielsen Media Research, the episode was seen by an estimated 1.04 million household viewers and gained a 0.3 ratings share among adults aged 18–49. The episode received universal acclaim, with critics praising Annet Mahendru's performance and the end to Nina's arc.

== Plot ==
Philip (Matthew Rhys), Elizabeth (Keri Russell) and William (Dylan Baker) are forced to quarantine with Gabriel (Frank Langella) at his apartment after their exposure to glanders. Elizabeth calls the Centre to drop the hit on Pastor Tim, and also calls Paige (Holly Taylor) to tell her they'll be out of the house for a few days. Elizabeth begins to develop symptoms, such as vomiting, as well as falling into delirium, while Gabriel is unable to stand up.

Agent Aderholt (Brandon J. Dirden) invites Martha (Alison Wright) to dinner, which she accepts. She calls Philip, panicked that they may be onto her, but Philip is unable to answer due to the quarantine. At their dinner, Martha lies, as originally instructed by Philip, about her relationship status, claiming she is seeing a married man. During their dinner, Stan (Noah Emmerich) sneaks into Martha's apartment to find anything incriminating, but ends up finding nothing.

By the next day, Gabriel and Elizabeth recover from their condition, and William allows Philip and Elizabeth to leave. Their state prompted Elizabeth to agree with Philip's insistence about not killing Pastor Tim, as it will affect their life with Paige, instead settling in trying to convince Tim and Alice in cooperating. They return home, deciding to take Paige and Henry (Keidrich Sellati) to a bowling alley.

In Russia, Oleg (Costa Ronin) visits his father Igor (Boris Krutonog) for his brother's funeral. Igor informs him that the situation with Nina (Annet Mahendru) is worsening, and it is proving to be difficult in finding a way to save her. Nevertheless, Igor intends to try, only asking him to stay for the sake of his mother.

Nina is moved to her former prison, awaiting her sentence. After dreaming of leaving Russia with Anton Baklanov (Michael Aronov), she is taken by the guards to an office to set up a transference. The officer informs her that her appeal was denied and her death sentence will be carried out shortly. As she panics, she is shot in the back of the head, dying immediately. After checking her, the guards wrap up her body and carry her out of the office.

== Production ==
=== Development ===
In March 2016, FX confirmed that the fourth episode of the season would be titled "Chloramphenicol", and that it would be written by Tracey Scott Wilson, and directed by Stefan Schwartz. This was Wilson's fourth writing credit, and Schwartz's second directing credit.

=== Writing ===
Nina's execution was based on an entry in the book Farewell by author Sergei Kostin, one of the series' consultants. The book detailed how Soviets would execute traitors, and Joe Weisberg said that Nina's execution was "lifted, literally beat by beat, out of that book."

=== Filming ===
Filming for the episode started on November 19, 2015 and wrapped by November 24, 2015.

== Reception ==
=== Viewers ===
In its original American broadcast, "Chloramphenicol" was seen by an estimated 1.04 million household viewers with a 0.3 in the 18-49 demographics. This means that 0.3 percent of all households with televisions watched the episode. This was a 26% increase in viewership from the previous episode, which was watched by 0.82 million household viewers with a 0.2 in the 18-49 demographics.

=== Critical reviews ===
"Chloramphenicol" received universal acclaim. The review aggregator website Rotten Tomatoes reported an 100% approval rating for the episode, based on 20 reviews. The site's consensus states: "'Chloramphenicol' delivers a shocker of an ending that turns The Americans on its head in a dynamic, pivotal episode."

Erik Adams of The A.V. Club gave the episode an "A" grade and wrote, "Here's how good 'Chloramphenicol' is: In an episode that kills off a major character and traps the protagonists in a pressure-cooker quarantine, there's still room for an expertly stitched together montage that marries a genre-hopping pop standard, a break-in, and a stunningly honest Martha monologue."

Alan Sepinwall of HitFix wrote, "even if Nina's death had been held for a different episode, and 'Chloramphenicol' had ended with Jennings family bowling night, it still would have been one of the series' best episodes. That's how powerful everything is for the show stateside right now – how perpetually on the verge of death, discovery, or both Elizabeth and Philip seem to be – and how strong the execution continues to be in terms of acting, writing, and directing." Anthony Breznican of Entertainment Weekly wrote, "RIP, Nina Sergeevna Krilova. And congratulations to actress Annet Mahendru for bringing her to life so well that we mourn her death so deeply."

Mike Hale of The New York Times wrote, "The Americans has the body count you’d expect from a show about Cold War espionage, but it had avoided killing off central characters. The F.B.I. agent Chris, the K.G.B. agent Gregory, the handler Kate and the informant Annelise were important but peripheral. The sudden death of Nina Sergeevna Krilova in Wednesday night’s episode, 'Chloramphenicol,' was the first involving one of the show's main cast." Genevieve Koski of Vulture gave the episode a perfect 5 star rating out of 5 and wrote, "'Chloramphenicol' makes the inevitable feel legitimately shocking, and that's almost entirely attributable to the way its final sequence is staged. A sharp contrast exists between the prelude to Nina's sentence and its aftermath, underlining the stark brutality of her death."

Ben Travers of IndieWire gave the episode an "A" grade and wrote, "Will their choice to let Pastor Tim and his wife live be their own undoing? We'll find out in the coming weeks, but — for as saddened as we are to see the great talents of Annet Mahendru leave the series — Season 4 just got a whole heckuva lot more virulent (which, we really didn't think was possible)." Matt Brennan of Slant Magazine wrote, "Though The Americans has rarely gone in for the chronological leaps familiar from Mad Men, Masters of Sex, and Halt and Catch Fire, this noticeable compression of events would seem to mark a new stage in the show's evolution."

Alec Bojalad of Den of Geek gave the episode a 4.5 star rating out of 5 and wrote, "Aside from Oleg and Stan's periodic concerns, the tragedy of Nina was just all about the tragedy of Nina while other characters tragedies were more universal. And now, here in 'Chloramphenicol' the tragedy of Nina comes to an appropriately tragic conclusion." Amy Amatangelo of Paste gave the episode a 9.8 out of 10 and wrote, "By the end of the episode, the Jennings family is bowling. A typical American family activity. Except that nothing about the Jennings is typical, and their happiness is guaranteed to be fleeting."
