= A Roy Rogers in Franconia =

- The Americans episode
- Episode no.: Season 4 Episode 12
- Directed by: Chris Long
- Written by: Joel Fields; Joe Weisberg
- Cinematography by: Alex Nepomniaschy
- Editing by: Sheri Bylander
- Production code: BDU412
- Original air date: June 1, 2016
- Running time: 43 minutes

Guest appearances
- Vera Cherny as Tatiana Evgenyevna Vyazemtseva; Daniel Flaherty as Matthew Beeman; Peter Jacobson as Agent Wolfe; Snezhana Chernova as Yelena Burova; Mark Lotito as Andy; Frank Langella as Gabriel

Episode chronology
← Previous "Dinner for Seven"	Next → "Persona Non Grata"
- The Americans season 4

"A Roy Rogers in Franconia" is the twelfth episode of the fourth season of the American period spy drama television series The Americans. It is the 51st overall episode of the series and was written by executive producer Joel Fields and series creator Joe Weisberg, and directed by executive producer Chris Long. It was released on FX on June 1, 2016.

The series is set during the Cold War and follows Elizabeth and Philip Jennings, two Soviet KGB intelligence officers posing as an American married couple living in Falls Church, a Virginia suburb of Washington, D.C., with their American-born children Paige and Henry. It also explores the conflict between Washington's FBI office and the KGB Rezidentura there, from the perspectives of agents on both sides, including the Jennings' neighbor Stan Beeman, an FBI agent working in counterintelligence. In the episode, William starts having second thoughts about his mission, while the FBI finds a bug inside the Mail Robot.

According to Nielsen Media Research, the episode was seen by an estimated 0.93 million household viewers and gained a 0.3 ratings share among adults aged 18–49. The episode received critical acclaim, with critics praising the tension, performances, writing and set-up for the season finale.

== Plot ==
Elizabeth (Keri Russell) and Paige (Holly Taylor) return home after the mugger incident, hiding this from Henry (Keidrich Sellati). Philip (Matthew Rhys) comforts them, although Paige is shaken over whether Elizabeth previously did something like this before.

Philip meets with William (Dylan Baker) to provide him the access code, but William says he will no longer steal bioweapons as he fears their repercussions. Later, he and Gabriel (Frank Langella) use a pay phone to contact Martha's parents, telling them she is fine and she loves them. They later talk with William, convincing him that his duties as KGB agent will be over if he delivers the Lassa virus. During this, Paige spends time with Matthew (Daniel Flaherty), and they kiss. She returns home, where her parents make it clear that they disapprove.

Aderholt (Brandon J. Dirden) starts investigating the Mail Robot, after finding a report that an old woman, Betty, died on the night it was repaired. He and other agents open the Mail Robot, discovering the bug. He informs Stan (Noah Emmerich) and Wolfe (Peter Jacobson), they decide to not disclose it as it would cost their jobs, but they decide to watch whoever changes the bug. A janitor is detained, claiming she worked for a mobster who tried to find out about a gambling operation.

At the Rezidentura, Tatiana (Vera Cherny) tells Oleg (Costa Ronin) that she is getting transferred to the embassy in Nairobi. She offers him the position of her deputy, which he decides to decline. Oleg calls his mother, who is still questioning when he will return to Russia. He later meets with Stan, expressing disdain for the bioweapons missions due to their high risk and the fact that Russian labs won't be able to handle them. He then reveals that the KGB has an inside man at an American lab, but is unable to identify him. After checking a list of possible names, the FBI identifies William as the inside man and sets out to catch him. Philip leaves to meet with William, and when Paige demands to know where he is going, Elizabeth reveals that he is picking up a weapon intended to defend Russia from any attack.

== Production ==
=== Development ===
In May 2016, FX confirmed that the twelfth episode of the season would be titled "A Roy Rogers in Franconia", and that it would be written by executive producer Joel Fields and series creator Joe Weisberg, and directed by executive producer Chris Long. This was Fields' 15th writing credit, Weisberg's 16th writing credit, and Long's second directing credit.

== Reception ==
=== Viewers ===
In its original American broadcast, "A Roy Rogers in Franconia" was seen by an estimated 0.93 million household viewers with a 0.3 in the 18-49 demographics. This means that 0.3 percent of all households with televisions watched the episode. This was a 14% increase in viewership from the previous episode, which was watched by 0.81 million household viewers with a 0.2 in the 18-49 demographics.

=== Critical reviews ===
"A Roy Rogers in Franconia" received critical acclaim. The review aggregator website Rotten Tomatoes reported an 100% approval rating for the episode, based on 14 reviews. The site's consensus states: "Long-played intrigues come to a head in 'A Roy Rogers Franconia' as The Americans sets the stage for what promises to be a harrowing season finale."

Erik Adams of The A.V. Club gave the episode an "A" grade and wrote, "In all sincerity, it is great. 'A Roy Rogers In Franconia' is another breathless chapter in what's proven to be the best season of the best show on TV. No other ongoing series can match The Americans for its balance of long-term and short-term storytelling. Tonight's episode achieves that all-important Peak TV goal — payoff — while also functioning as a compelling piece of standalone entertainment. It's a sterling example of The Americans seeing the forest and the trees, wondering through its characters if working toward a greater good is worth all the personal sacrifices it requires."

Alan Sepinwall of HitFix wrote, "This job is too much, whether you're a hardened operative like William or a kid like Paige. Everyone hits a breaking point. But it looks like a lot of characters are hitting their breaking point at the same time, which should lead to a nerve-wracking finale. Not fun, but riveting as hell." Anthony Breznican of Entertainment Weekly wrote, "So begins the penultimate episode of season 4 of The Americans, which is building toward... we don't really know. The infiltration of the bio-weapons lab?"

Mike Hale of The New York Times wrote, "'A Roy Rogers in Franconia' forced a reconsideration. Not a total one — we still miss the exiled Martha desperately. But Mr. Weisberg and Mr. Fields, through sheer persistence and a radical but deftly handled twist at the end of last week's episode, have managed to make Paige's between-two-worlds predicament interesting." Genevieve Koski of Vulture gave the episode a 4 star rating out of 5 and wrote, "That skeptical aspect of Paige's personality has been clear for some time now. Even her attraction to religion was born out of a search for meaning and a desire to make change happen. But in recent episodes, The Americans has more explicitly implied that this very same instinct could end up drawing Paige into her parents' world. Paige and Elizabeth are linked by their passion, by their desire to make the world better, and that connection may ultimately supersede whatever ideological nuances separate them."

Ben Travers of IndieWire gave the episode an "A–" grade and wrote, "It all set the stage for next week's sure-to-be-wild season finale, but 'A Roy Rodgers in Franconia' certainly can stand by itself as a thrilling episode of television." Matt Brennan of Slant Magazine wrote, "In tonight's episode of The Americans, 'A Roy Rogers in Franconia,' the sources of fear are specific and conditional, ranging from an immediate threat (an attempted mugging) to a speculative one (a Lhasa outbreak on the Eastern seaboard), but fear itself is the common thread, the experience each character shares."

Alec Bojalad of Den of Geek gave the episode a 4 star rating out of 5 and wrote, "One of the many things that The Americans does better than any show on television is to create a sense of fatigue: both for its audience and its characters. I suspect that's one of the reasons it hasn't caught pop culture's rabid attention like other shows have." Amy Amatangelo of Paste gave the episode a 9.6 out of 10 and wrote, "What I continue to find fascinating about The Americans is that I can simultaneously root for both Stan and Elizabeth and Philip. I want them both to succeed, which I know is not possible. The show has put Stan, a good FBI agent, in this position of being close to finding out the truth many times. Since the show recently announced it will conclude at the end of the sixth season, the fourth season finale seems like the perfect time for Stan to start to figure out the Jennings’ true identity."
