= Travel Agents (The Americans) =

- The Americans episode
- Episode no.: Season 4 Episode 7
- Directed by: Dan Attias
- Written by: Tanya Barfield
- Cinematography by: Joseph Bradley Smith
- Editing by: Daniel Valverde; Katie Ennis
- Production code: BDU407
- Original air date: April 27, 2016
- Running time: 42 minutes

Guest appearances
- Vera Cherny as Tatiana Evgenyevna Vyazemtseva; Daniel Flaherty as Matthew Beeman; Cotter Smith as Deputy Attorney General; Polly Lee as Joan; Aaron Roman Weiner as Agent Brooks; Frank Langella as Gabriel

Episode chronology
← Previous "The Rat"	Next → "The Magic of David Copperfield V: The Statue of Liberty Disappears"
- The Americans season 4

"Travel Agents" is the seventh episode of the fourth season of the American period spy drama television series The Americans. It is the 46th overall episode of the series and was written by Tanya Barfield, and directed by Dan Attias. It was released on FX on April 27, 2016.

The series is set during the Cold War and follows Elizabeth and Philip Jennings, two Soviet KGB intelligence officers posing as an American married couple living in Falls Church, a Virginia suburb of Washington, D.C., with their American-born children Paige and Henry. It also explores the conflict between Washington's FBI office and the KGB Rezidentura there, from the perspectives of agents on both sides, including the Jennings' neighbor Stan Beeman, an FBI agent working in counterintelligence. In the episode, Philip and Elizabeth try to find Martha, while Stan and the FBI search for her.

According to Nielsen Media Research, the episode was seen by an estimated 0.90 million household viewers and gained a 0.2 ratings share among adults aged 18–49. The episode received critical acclaim, with critics praising the closure to Martha's marriage to Philip.

== Plot ==
Philip (Matthew Rhys) and Elizabeth (Keri Russell) arrive at the safe house, only to be told by Gabriel (Frank Langella) that Martha (Alison Wright) left and threatened him. Stan (Noah Emmerich) and Aderholt (Brandon J. Dirden) inform Gaad (Richard Thomas) that Clark's death certificate is from 30 years ago, making him eventually deem Martha as a traitor.

Philip awaits in a call center with Joan (Polly Lee) in case Martha calls, while Elizabeth constantly checks many of the spots that Martha liked to visit. The FBI trace a phone call from Martha in Woodley Park, in which she calls her parents to tell them to not believe the incoming reports. While Stan and the agents check the area, Martha moves to Rock Creek Park to call Philip, crying that he never should have left her alone with Gabriel. When she says her location, he agrees to meet her immediately. Joan informs Elizabeth about her location, and she also leaves to meet Martha.

At Rock Creek Park, Elizabeth finds Martha. However, Martha is uncooperative with Elizabeth, forcing the latter to punch her in the stomach. Elizabeth tells her that the FBI is going after her and Clark, and both could face going to prison if they are arrested. She then takes Martha back to the safe house, before Philip reaches the park with no trace of Martha. During this, Oleg (Costa Ronin) and Tatiana (Vera Cherny) work on the papers needed to exfiltrate Martha out of the country, later telling Arkady (Lev Gorn) that they found a pilot. Gaad also shows Stan that Martha recently married Clark, a KGB agent, and slowly realizes his career at the FBI is over.

At the safe house, Philip reunites with Martha, finally revealing his real name. When Elizabeth questions him if he wants to leave his life in America to live in Russia with Martha, Philip dismisses the idea. Even though she tells him to lie to Martha, Philip tells Martha that she is leaving for Russia and they won't see each other ever again. This devastates Martha, as she will be alone and sees herself struggling to fit in. The episode ends with Philip and Martha in bed, unable to sleep.

== Production ==
=== Development ===
In March 2016, FX confirmed that the seventh episode of the season would be titled "Travel Agents", and that it would be written by Tanya Barfield, and directed by Dan Attias. This was Barfield's first writing credit, and Attias's third directing credit.

=== Filming ===
Filming for the episode started on January 5, 2016 and wrapped by January 8, 2016.

== Reception ==
=== Viewers ===
In its original American broadcast, "Travel Agents" was seen by an estimated 0.90 million household viewers with a 0.2 in the 18-49 demographics. This means that 0.2 percent of all households with televisions watched the episode. This was even in viewership from the previous episode, which was watched by 0.90 million household viewers with a 0.2 in the 18-49 demographics.

=== Critical reviews ===
The review aggregator website Rotten Tomatoes reported an 100% approval rating for the episode, based on 16 reviews. The site's consensus states: "'Travel Agents' continues The Americans' inexorable, tension-filled creep toward one character's seemingly inevitable exit while further deepening the show's long emotional arcs."

Eric Goldman of IGN gave the episode an "amazing" 9.3 out of 10, writing "It's interesting that The Americans still has no set/announced ending, with at least one more season planned and possibly two. Because with Nina's death and now Martha losing everything, it's really felt like the year where the huge consequences of this life are coming forward for everyone, as we see these tragic outcomes come to fruition. The show is not giving anyone an easy way out – there's no Deus ex machine to be found here – which is both awful for characters we care about and commendable dramatically."

Erik Adams of The A.V. Club gave the episode an "A" grade and wrote, "'Travel Agents' is the first Americans script by playwright Tanya Barfield, and the intimacy of its second half evinces a writer with a theatrical background. It's a stunning translation of the show's two faces, with the spy stuff lighting off fireworks in the opening acts, their brilliant flashes then illuminating the quieter scenes that follow. But first there's that punch, which is so unexpected and visceral that it actually made me gasp in unison with Martha."

Alan Sepinwall of HitFix wrote, "No matter what's coming next, Martha doesn't seem long for the show, unless the plan is for her to move into Nina's old room at the stealth bomber factory and pal around with Vasily and Baklanov. And if she's going, she's going out with a hell of a run of episodes." Anthony Breznican of Entertainment Weekly wrote, "At the safe house, Martha and Clark are lying beside each other, unmoving but wide awake. Waiting for the next thing. The last thing."

Mike Hale of The New York Times wrote, "Wednesday's episode, 'Travel Agents,' was a splendid demonstration of the show's ability — more rare than you'd think in the peak-TV era — to do more than one thing well. It was a great cat-and-mouse suspense story from start to finish, as both the Soviet and American sides ran around Washington playing a game of Where's Martha?" Genevieve Koski of Vulture gave the episode a 4 star rating out of 5 and wrote, "'Travel Agents' quietly ends on the precipice of major changes. Although some specifics have been filled in regarding next steps, this episode mostly postpones the inevitable. In that postponement, though, The Americans lets its characters achieve some emotional clarity. And in true Americans fashion, it's devastating."

Ben Travers of IndieWire gave the episode an "A–" and wrote, "This week we won't predict what’s coming in Episode 8. As illustrated in this passionate hour of television, the love we have for these characters is too strong to hope against hope for happiness." Matt Brennan of Slant Magazine wrote, "In the show's arc this season, 'Travel Agents' performs much the same function: A sharp exhalation, a moment of release, paves the way for a more restrained, if no less formidable, reckoning. One half of the episode is made up of searches, stakeouts, and wiretaps; the other, of questions, confessions, and tangled sympathies. It is, in short, a cleverly constructed hybrid, resolving the tension of the previous three episodes only to unleash a torrent of emotion."

Alec Bojalad of Den of Geek scored the episode four out of five and wrote, "'Travel Agents' is two worthwhile episodes of The Americans indelicately smushed into one. The first is an exciting KGB vs. FBI pursuit of everyone's favorite unwitting secretary turned mole Martha. The second is essentially a marriage drama in which Clark is forced to finally 'break up' with Martha." Amy Amatangelo of Paste gave the episode a 9.1 out of 10 and wrote, "This may be the saddest episode The Americans has ever done. Poor Martha is leaving her parents and her 'husband' behind, to start a life in Russia. What kind of life will that be? I'm still holding out hope that somehow she doesn't get on that plane."
