= The Americans season 4 =

The Americans
- Season 4
- DVD cover
- No. of episodes: 13

Release
- Original network: FX
- Original release: March 16 – June 8, 2016

Season chronology
- ← Previous; Season 3 Next → Season 5

The fourth season of the American television drama series The Americans, consisting of 13 episodes, premiered on FX on March 16, 2016, and concluded on June 8, 2016.

The events of the fourth season begin immediately after the events of the last episode of the third season in March 1983 and end on the night of Super Bowl XVIII, January 22, 1984, which Paige and Matthew are watching at Stan's house in the finale.

== Cast ==
=== Main ===
- Keri Russell as Elizabeth Jennings (Nadezhda), a KGB officer
- Matthew Rhys as Philip Jennings (Mischa), a KGB officer
- Dylan Baker as William Crandall, a KGB officer biochemical warfare scientist posing as an American
- Brandon J. Dirden as FBI agent Dennis Aderholt
- Lev Gorn as Arkady Ivanovich Zotov, the KGB's Resident
- Annet Mahendru as Nina Sergeevna Krilova, a prisoner in the Soviet Union
- Costa Ronin as Oleg Igorevich Burov, a KGB officer
- Keidrich Sellati as Henry Jennings, Elizabeth and Philip's son
- Holly Taylor as Paige Jennings, Elizabeth and Philip's daughter
- Richard Thomas as Agent Frank Gaad, Special Agent In Charge of the FBI Counterintelligence Division
- Alison Wright as Martha Hanson, Agent Gaad's secretary and Philip's informant
- Noah Emmerich as FBI agent Stan Beeman

=== Recurring ===
- Michael Aronov as Anton Baklanov, a scientist involved in stealth technology who has been recaptured by the Soviets after defecting
- Kelly AuCoin as Pastor Tim, the head of a church Paige Jennings attends
- Daniel Flaherty as Matthew Beeman, Stan's son
- Vera Cherny as Tatiana Evgenyevna Vyazemtseva, a KGB officer working at the Rezidentura
- Julia Garner as Kimmy Breland, the daughter of the head of the CIA's Afghan group
- Peter Jacobson as Agent Wolfe, Gaad's replacement at the FBI
- Peter Mark Kendall as Hans, a graduate student and KGB informant being trained by Elizabeth
- Boris Krutonog as Igor Burov, Oleg's father.
- Frank Langella as Gabriel, the Jennings' KGB handler
- Margo Martindale as Claudia, the Jennings' KGB supervisor
- Ruthie Ann Miles as Young Hee Seong, a Korean immigrant and Mary Kay consultant whom Elizabeth befriends to gain access to Young Hee's husband
- Susan Misner as Sandra Beeman, Stan's estranged wife
- Karen Pittman as Lisa, a Northrop employee from whom Elizabeth is gleaning information
- Callie Thorne as Tori, Stan's girlfriend
- Peter Von Berg as Vasili Nikolaevich, a former KGB Resident
- Rob Yang as Don Seong, Young Hee's husband, who is of special interest to the KGB

== Production ==
The series was renewed for a 13-episode fourth season on March 31, 2015. In April 2015, FX announced Frank Langella would continue his recurring role on the series. The season began principal photography on October 13, 2015. Broadway veteran Ruthie Ann Miles was cast as a new acquaintance of one of Elizabeth's guises. Writing for the season had been completed by January 28, 2016; and the final day of filming was March 9, 2016.

== Episodes ==
No. overall	No. in season	Title	Directed by	Written by	Original release date	Prod. code	US viewers (millions)
40	1	"Glanders"	Thomas Schlamme	Joel Fields & Joe Weisberg	March 16, 2016	BDU401	1.11
Philip confesses to Martha that he killed Gene to protect her, much to her horror. Paige talks with Pastor Tim about finding out that her parents are spies. Gabriel gives Elizabeth and Philip a mission to meet with William Crandall, a deep-cover KGB agent who has access to U.S. biological weapons research. Philip has been attending the same EST meeting as Stan's estranged wife Sandra. In one meeting, Philip recounts brutally beating a bully when he was young, omitting the fact that he killed him. After the meeting Stan's girlfriend Tori sees them together at a restaurant. In Russia, Nina continues working with Anton Baklanov and later makes a request to her handler, Vasili Nikolaevich, to see her husband. Arkady, suspicious of what Tatiana is working on, learns that it involves chemical and biological weapons. Martha gets the FBI's schedule for Crandall's surveillance, enabling the Jenningses to meet him unobserved. Crandall gives them a vial containing a strain of bacteria that causes glanders, a deadly and contagious disease. When they arrive home Stan angrily confronts Philip about meeting with Sandra. Philip denies that they are having an affair, but Stan does not believe him and slams him against a wall. After Stan leaves, Philip inspects the unbroken vial in his jacket pocket.
41	2	"Pastor Tim"	Chris Long	Joel Fields & Joe Weisberg	March 23, 2016	BDU402	0.93
Philip tells Elizabeth that he has been attending EST meetings and explains why Stan was angry. They take the vial to Gabriel, who insists they make the exchange and continue working with William Crandall. Elizabeth listens to tapes and discovers Paige has told Pastor Tim about their true work. She and Philip debate about how to control the situation, and Paige later confesses to Elizabeth. Philip meets with an airline pilot for the vial exchange, but the pilot is extremely nervous and draws the attention of a security guard. Philip kills the guard, the pilot leaves the vial behind, and Philip takes it. Nina asks her husband to deliver a note to Anton's son but the plan fails. She confesses to Vasili and resigns herself to spending her life in prison. Gabriel tells Elizabeth that her mother has died. She tells Philip about Paige's confession and her mother's death, and he agrees that they are in trouble.
42	3	"Experimental Prototype City of Tomorrow"	Kevin Dowling	Stephen Schiff	March 30, 2016	BDU403	0.82
Philip and Elizabeth meet with Pastor Tim and learn that he told his wife about Paige's confession. They reveal this to Paige, who feels betrayed by Pastor Tim. Philip asks Paige to maintain a relationship in order to keep the secret of their identities contained but Paige is reluctant. Gabriel and Claudia debate the options of either killing Tim and his wife or extracting the agents; Philip and Elizabeth have the same conversation. The Center's solution is to have the Jennings family go on vacation to the Epcot amusement park, during which time other KGB operatives will kill Tim and his wife, although Philip believes Paige will suspect the truth. The Jenningses discover Gabriel in his apartment apparently infected with glanders from the vial and realize that they are likely infected also. They retrieve William, infecting him as well, and he provides antibiotics, requiring them all to remain quarantined in Gabriel's apartment for the next 36 hours. The Jenningses' vacation is cancelled.
43	4	"Chloramphenicol"	Stefan Schwartz	Tracey Scott Wilson	April 6, 2016	BDU404	1.04
With glanders lingering, Philip, Elizabeth and William quarantine in Gabriel's apartment for several days, worrying Paige. Elizabeth calls off the execution of Pastor Tim and Alice and begins to develop symptoms. Martha goes out to dinner with Agent Aderholt; to explain her movements after work she tells him that she is dating a married man. Agent Beeman searches her apartment during her absence but finds nothing incriminating. By the morning both Gabriel and Elizabeth have improved and William pronounces them out of danger. Elizabeth finds that she now agrees with Philip that they cannot kill Pastor Tim and Alice without alienating Paige. The Jenningses propose that they instead "work" the couple to ensure their secrecy. Oleg returns home to Russia and asks his influential father to assist Nina. His father agrees on the condition that, if he succeeds, Oleg will remain in Russia. In prison, Nina has another dream of being set free. A trio of guards wake her and lead her down a hallway, where she is informed that her appeal has been denied and that her death sentence will be carried out shortly. She begins to break down but is executed on the spot.
44	5	"Clark's Place"	Noah Emmerich	Peter Ackerman	April 13, 2016	BDU405	0.89
Hans reports his belief that Martha is being tailed, causing unease throughout the KGB. Philip is unnerved at the news and the possible consequences. After learning of Nina's demise, Oleg returns to the Rezidentura, where he is met with little sympathy from Arkady. Oleg meets with Stan and informs him of Nina's death. Elizabeth continues to develop her cover as a Mary Kay salesperson. Philip makes peace with Stan following their falling out. The Jenningses meet with Pastor Tim and his wife, Alice, to convince them that they are all working for peace and justice.
45	6	"The Rat"	Kari Skogland	Joshua Brand	April 20, 2016	BDU406	0.90
Philip extracts Martha from the field. They stay with Gabriel in a safe house while arrangements can be made to get her out of the country. Martha panics and leaves the house despite Gabriel's efforts to make her stay. Stan and Aderholt further unravel the truth about Martha and Clark, and present the discovery to Gaad. Elizabeth learns of the trust that Philip has placed in Martha.
46	7	"Travel Agents"	Dan Attias	Tanya Barfield	April 27, 2016	BDU407	0.90
Martha is wandering the streets in confusion and fear after leaving the safe house. Philip and Elizabeth bring the sample to the safe house; Gabriel tells them that Martha has left, and they try to find her. Gaad is worried about the repercussions from the discovery that his secretary was secretly married to a KGB officer. Stan is ordered to contact Oleg to inquire about Martha but he refuses. Martha calls her parents from a pay phone; the FBI hears the conversation and tries to find her, having located the phone booth. She calls Philip and he convinces her to stay put while he comes to her. Elizabeth reaches her first and forcefully abducts her back to the safe house. Elizabeth is resentful of the emotional connection Philip has forged with Martha. She tests him by suggesting he could return to Russia along with Martha. She suggests he should lie to Martha and say that he will be with her in Russia. He tells Martha the truth – that they will probably never see each other again - and she is deeply disturbed and grieved. Oleg and Tatiana find a pilot to take Martha to Cuba as the first step of extracting her to Moscow.
47	8	"The Magic of David Copperfield V: The Statue of Liberty Disappears"	Matthew Rhys	Stephen Schiff	May 4, 2016	BDU408	1.02
Elizabeth attends a EST seminar. She accuses Philip of being taken in, but in the process reveals her jealousy over the bond Philip had formed with Martha. Martha arrives safely in Cuba along with the rat containing the tularemia sample. With Martha gone, Philip spends more time at home. Gaad is fired. Elizabeth goes to the movies with Young-hee and later gets called for a surprise meeting with Lisa, who has relapsed into drinking after Maurice left her and took all their money. Elizabeth is forced to kill Lisa when Lisa becomes intent on reporting "Jack" to the police. Gabriel meets with the Jenningses, realizes they are under too much strain, and tells them they will not be given new operations. Philip and Elizabeth finally take Paige and Henry to Epcot. Seven months later, Paige comes home from mini golf with Pastor Tim and a pregnant Alice, reluctantly reporting on their activities to her parents. Before Gaad leaves on a trip to Asia, he is visited by Stan; Gaad warns him not to lose sight of who he is investigating.
48	9	"The Day After"	Daniel Sackheim	Tracey Scott Wilson	May 11, 2016	BDU409	0.90
Philip teaches Paige how to drive. She asks that the family attend a party for Pastor Tim before he goes to Ethiopia, to make him feel that they are "normal". William contacts Philip without telling Gabriel, in order to share his ethical concerns about obtaining ever more deadly biological weapons. Elizabeth drugs Young-hee's husband Don and makes him think that they slept together. She begins to have misgivings about doing such damage to Young-hee's life. Pastor Tim talks to Philip about Paige's mental well-being. The 1983 TV film The Day After airs and makes many of the characters uneasy about nuclear weapons.
49	10	"Munchkins"	Steph Green	Peter Ackerman	May 18, 2016	BDU410	0.82
The Jenningses are shocked to learn that Pastor Tim is missing in Ethiopia. Alice is suspicious and threatens them, saying she has given a tape to her lawyer with instructions for it to be sent to the FBI if Tim dies or anything happens to her. Paige is confounded by the situation but is able to soothe a distressed Alice. As "Patty's" mission with Young-hee continues, Elizabeth finds herself even more conflicted about the damage it may cause to Young-hee's family. Philip checks in on Kimmy, who has discovered that her father works for the CIA. Pastor Tim is found safe in Ethiopia and Alice apologizes to Paige for her reaction. Paige passes the news on to her parents but does not ask Alice for the lawyer's tape to be returned. Although Elizabeth and Philip believe the tape was not actually sent, Elizabeth tells her that it was a smart decision. Paige spends time with Stan's son Matthew. Three KGB agents enter Gaad's hotel room in Thailand and Gaad is accidentally killed as he tries to escape them.
50	11	"Dinner for Seven"	Nicole Kassell	Joshua Brand	May 25, 2016	BDU411	0.81
Pastor Tim expresses remorse for his wife's actions and sympathizes with the Jenningses' predicament. Elizabeth invites them for a family dinner but Stan unexpectedly joins them. "Patty's" operation is completed with a story of her suicide; KGB agents copy Don's computer information to search for the clearance code. Stan ends his connection with Oleg. Elizabeth picks up Paige from the food pantry and they are confronted by two muggers. Elizabeth gives them her wallet, but one of them menaces Paige. Elizabeth knocks him down with a quick strike and fatally stabs the other. Paige is shocked but they leave safely.
51	12	"A Roy Rogers in Franconia"	Chris Long	Joel Fields & Joe Weisberg	June 1, 2016	BDU412	0.93
Paige is still shaken from seeing her mother kill the mugger. She asks Elizabeth about the killing she has done and whether she felt any fear. William tells Philip he will no longer steal bioweapons as he feels that it is immoral. Tatiana informs Oleg she is moving to Nairobi and offers him a post as her deputy. After some time Oleg refuses her offer. Aderholt finds the bug in the mail robot. Oleg talks to his mother in Russia. He informs Stan about the KGB bioweapons mission because he fears Russian labs are not equipped to handle such dangerous pathogens, based on his experience. Gabriel tries to convince William to remain loyal to his country and not give in to his emotions. Paige kisses Matthew and her parents disapprove. Annoyed, she tries to find out more about their secret mission. Stan and the FBI have identified William and are ready to catch him.
52	13	"Persona Non Grata"	Chris Long	Joel Fields & Joe Weisberg	June 8, 2016	BDU413	0.77
William is cornered by the FBI before he can hand off the virus to Philip. He breaks the vial and infects himself. In Russia, Philip's son Mikhail Semenov is released from a mental institution. Oleg informs Arkady about leaving for Russia to be with his family. In an EST meeting, Philip confesses his disenchantment with his job. Mikhail visits his grandfather and receives a package left by his mother with passports and currencies. He is determined to find his father in America as instructed by his mother. Arkady is confronted by the FBI and accused of being responsible for Gaad's murder and William's theft of pathogens. He is ordered to leave the U.S. within 48 hours. Gabriel suggests Philip and Elizabeth return to Russia. Tatiana informs Oleg that she has been temporarily assigned Arkady's job. Oleg tells her he is returning to Russia. William's condition worsens and he begins to cough up blood. While delirious William says he wished he had settled down and had a couple of children "like them". Stan tells Philip he saw Matthew and Paige kissing. Philip tells Paige not to see Matthew again, believing she is in over her head.

== Reception ==
=== Critical response ===
The fourth season received widespread acclaim from critics. On Rotten Tomatoes, it received a 99 percent approval rating with an average score of 9.2 out of 10 based on 45 reviews, with a critics consensus of: "With its fourth season, The Americans continues to deliver top-tier spy drama while sending its characters in directions that threaten to destroy their freedoms – and their lives." On Metacritic, the season has a score of 95 out of 100 based on 28 reviews, indicating "universal acclaim".

Vikram Murthi of The A.V. Club gave it a perfect "A" grade and wrote, "If the fourth season reminds viewers of anything, it's that The Americans has a masterful control of tone, doling out horror and slow-burn dread like very few of its contemporaries." Ben Travers of Indiewire also gave it an "A" grade and wrote that the season "is on the equally stellar level of its predecessors". Brian Tallerico of RogerEbert.com praised the series and wrote, "It is that depth of character and nuance in the writing that elevates The Americans, along with its willingness to offer stunning narrative developments. [...] I'm now convinced that when we close the final chapter of this televised novel we may finally appreciate one of the best shows we've ever seen."

Maureen Ryan of Variety reviewed the show, praising it for its refusal to go in "cartoonish or preposterous directions" and thereby avoiding becoming one of a "cacophony of shows doing superficially outrageous things for attention". Ryan wrote that it "grows louder by the day" and pointed out that Elizabeth and Philip are now "even more untenable, and the show has never been one to drag out developments past their potency".

Rob Sheffield of Rolling Stone said that "the acting is impeccable" and that it "keeps getting more intense as it goes along, hitting harder than any drama on television right now".

=== Accolades ===
For the 32nd TCA Awards, The Americans won for Outstanding Achievement in Drama, was nominated for Program of the Year and Keri Russell was nominated for Individual Achievement in Drama. For the 68th Primetime Emmy Awards, the series received five nominations, for Outstanding Drama Series, Matthew Rhys for Outstanding Lead Actor in a Drama Series, Keri Russell for Outstanding Lead Actress in a Drama Series, and Joel Fields and Joe Weisberg for Outstanding Writing for a Drama Series for the season finale "Persona Non Grata", while Margo Martindale won for Outstanding Guest Actress in a Drama Series. The prior omissions that the show has received at the Emmys was considered to be snubbed by the Emmys in the drama and acting categories by critics.

For both the 7th Critics' Choice Television Awards and 74th Golden Globe Awards, Matthew Rhys and Keri Russell were nominated for Best Actor and Best Actress in a Drama Series, respectively. For the 69th Writers Guild of America Awards, the series won the award for Best Drama Series.
