= The Rat (The Americans) =

- The Americans episode
- Episode no.: Season 4 Episode 6
- Directed by: Kari Skogland
- Written by: Joshua Brand
- Cinematography by: Alex Nepomniaschy
- Editing by: Sheri Bylander
- Production code: BDU406
- Original air date: April 20, 2016
- Running time: 45 minutes

Guest appearances
- Vera Cherny as Tatiana Evgenyevna Vyazemtseva; Peter Mark Kendall as Hans; Aaron Roman Weiner as Agent Brooks; Frank Langella as Gabriel

Episode chronology
← Previous "Clark's Place"	Next → "Travel Agents"
- The Americans season 4

"The Rat" is the sixth episode of the fourth season of the American period spy drama television series The Americans. It is the 45th overall episode of the series and was written by consulting producer Joshua Brand, and directed by Kari Skogland. It was released on FX on April 20, 2016.

The series is set during the Cold War and follows Elizabeth and Philip Jennings, two Soviet KGB intelligence officers posing as an American married couple living in Falls Church, a Virginia suburb of Washington, D.C., with their American-born children Paige and Henry. It also explores the conflict between Washington's FBI office and the KGB Rezidentura there, from the perspectives of agents on both sides, including the Jennings' neighbor Stan Beeman, an FBI agent working in counterintelligence. In the episode, Philip takes Martha to a safe house, while Stan and Aderholt research her past.

According to Nielsen Media Research, the episode was seen by an estimated 0.90 million household viewers and gained a 0.2 ratings share among adults aged 18–49. The episode received critical acclaim, with critics praising Martha's storyline, tension, performances and ending.

== Plot ==
Stan (Noah Emmerich) and Aderholt (Brandon J. Dirden) continue investigating Martha (Alison Wright), checking her history background. Her life involves an abortion in 1964, as well as being romantically involved with Chris Amador prior to his death.

Philip (Matthew Rhys) desperately tries to save Martha, asking William (Dylan Baker) to get help from the Centre, but William states it is unlikely. He then picks up Martha and takes her to a safe house, saying that the FBI may know about her. Gabriel (Frank Langella) arrives shortly, per Philip's request. Gabriel is not delighted over Martha's stay, but Philip refuses to let her return to work, threatening that he revealed his cover to her. Gabriel and Elizabeth (Keri Russell) continue attending Martha's safe house to provide her with supplies.

Alone with her, Philip finally confesses to Martha that he is a KGB agent. While shocked, she still wants to stay with him and they proceed to have sex. Stan and Aderholt check Martha's apartment, but don't find anything incriminating. However, the FBI has managed to find a connection to a man named Clark Westerfeld, and is working in finding more information. During this, Arkady (Lev Gorn) informs Oleg (Costa Ronin) that he needs to get in charge of Martha getting exfiltrated to Russia.

Stan and Aderholt disclose their discoveries to Gaad (Richard Thomas), surprising him over Martha's actions. Philip meets with William, who shares his story of how the female agent who was "his wife" was returned to Russia, something that he laments. Martha finds Philip gone and only Gabriel waiting for her at the safe house, and decides to leave. Gabriel tries to convince her to return, but is forced to let her go when she threatens to loudly yell that he works for the KGB.

== Production ==
=== Development ===
In March 2016, FX confirmed that the sixth episode of the season would be titled "The Rat", and that it would be written by consulting producer Joshua Brand, and directed by Kari Skogland. This was Brand's ninth writing credit, and Skogland's first directing credit.

=== Filming ===
Filming for the episode started on December 14, 2015 and wrapped by December 18, 2015.

== Reception ==
=== Viewers ===
In its original American broadcast, "The Rat" was seen by an estimated 0.90 million household viewers with a 0.2 in the 18-49 demographics. This means that 0.2 percent of all households with televisions watched the episode. This was a slight increase in viewership from the previous episode, which was watched by 0.89 million household viewers with a 0.3 in the 18-49 demographics.

=== Critical reviews ===
"The Rat" received critical acclaim. The review aggregator website Rotten Tomatoes reported an 100% approval rating for the episode, based on 14 reviews. The site's consensus states: "An intense and satisfying episode, 'The Rat' underscores the creators' penchant for uncomfortable, slow-burning, compelling storytelling as the seeds are sown for a key character's demise."

Joshua Alston of The A.V. Club gave the episode an "A–" grade and wrote, "'The Rat' is the latest demonstration of Joe Weisberg and Joel Fields' commitment to never getting too comfortable in their storytelling. The discovery of Martha's betrayal and Philip's decision to bring her in means an altered status quo and a new normal for nearly every character in the show. This is the perfect moment for such a leap, considering that season four is the first time when it seems like The Americans might not be willing or able to deliver on all its promises. The season three cliffhanger, Paige's confession to Pastor Tim, seemed like a knot too difficult to untie, but six episodes into season four, Pastor Tim hasn't been nearly the problem he initially appeared to be."

Alan Sepinwall of HitFix wrote, "We'll just have to see if she ends up flying to Russia with a suitcase, or zipped inside of one. Hoping for the former as her best outcome at the moment, dreading the thought of the latter. And yet as bad as I feel for her, good on Stan for finally figuring out just how bad Martha had become." Anthony Breznican of Entertainment Weekly wrote, "Applause for actress Alison Wright. I think all fans of The Americans are amazed Martha has survived this long, but now she is truly teetering on the edge. If looks could kill, the one Gabriel gives her as she walks away would end poor Martha for good."

Mike Hale of The New York Times wrote, "The Americans gave us what we wanted on Wednesday night — well, what a lot of us wanted, I suspect. The episode, 'The Rat,' was the apotheosis of Martha Hanson. (Until next week, anyway.)" Genevieve Koski of Vulture gave the episode a 4 star rating out of 5 and wrote, "On some level, Philip means those promises to Martha. He desperately wants everything to be okay, for Martha to survive and not go to prison for colluding with him. His guilt over the position he’s brought Martha to is tremendous. But there's something deeper motivating Philip's behavior: He's protective of Martha, and defiant toward Gabriel and Elizabeth when they question his decision to 'bring her in.' It's enough to suggest that a stronger emotional connection exists — and nobody is willing to admit it."

Ben Travers of IndieWire gave the episode an "A" grade and wrote, "The ball has started rolling, and there's no stopping it now. The rest of Season 4 is going to be one helluva ride." Matt Brennan of Slant Magazine wrote, "In 'The Rat,' seeing is indeed believing, and removing the veil lays bare the risk that inheres in the concept of trust."

Alec Bojalad of Den of Geek gave the episode a 4.5 star rating out of 5 and wrote, "And so Martha is out on her own and the only rat that Philip and Elizabeth are left with is the actual one infected with a mysterious virus that William has brought them." Amy Amatangelo of Paste gave the episode a 9.8 out of 10 and wrote, "Martha's death has seemed inevitable since the day we met her. But the show continues to surprise me. This was an amazing episode of television."
