= Glanders (The Americans) =

- The Americans episode
- Episode no.: Season 4 Episode 1
- Directed by: Thomas Schlamme
- Written by: Joel Fields; Joe Weisberg
- Cinematography by: Alex Nepomniaschy
- Editing by: Daniel Valverde
- Production code: BDU401
- Original air date: March 16, 2016
- Running time: 50 minutes

Guest appearances
- Michael Aronov as Anton Baklanov; Kelly AuCoin as Pastor Tim; Vera Cherny as Tatiana Evgenyevna Vyazemtseva; Susan Misner as Sandra Beeman; Callie Thorne as Tori; Peter Von Berg as Vasili Nikolaevich; Peter Mark Kendall as Hans; Aaron Roman Weiner as Agent Brooks; Frank Langella as Gabriel

Episode chronology
← Previous "March 8, 1983"	Next → "Pastor Tim"
- The Americans season 4

"Glanders" is the first episode of the fourth season of the American period spy drama television series The Americans. It is the 40th overall episode of the series and was written by executive producer Joel Fields and series creator Joe Weisberg, and directed by Thomas Schlamme. It was released on FX on March 16, 2016.

The series is set during the Cold War and follows Elizabeth and Philip Jennings, two Soviet KGB intelligence officers posing as an American married couple living in Falls Church, a Virginia suburb of Washington, D.C., with their American-born children Paige and Henry. It also explores the conflict between Washington's FBI office and the KGB Rezidentura there, from the perspectives of agents on both sides, including the Jennings' neighbor Stan Beeman, an FBI agent working in counterintelligence. In the episode, Philip and Elizabeth must meet with an undercover KGB agent, while Paige meets with Pastor Tim to discuss her parents' real identities.

According to Nielsen Media Research, the episode was seen by an estimated 1.11 million household viewers and gained a 0.3 ratings share among adults aged 18–49. The episode received critical acclaim, with critics praising the performances, storylines and atmosphere.

== Plot ==
Philip (Matthew Rhys) is unable to sleep, haunted by the memory of him killing a boy when he was younger. He visits Martha (Alison Wright) at her house, telling her he killed Gene to protect her. Martha is horrified, as she did not want Gene dead. While Philip says he cannot visit her more often as Stan (Noah Emmerich) will suspect, he claims it does not change anything between them.

Gabriel (Frank Langella) is angry with Philip and Elizabeth (Keri Russell) for violating his instructions in not going to Germany. Nevertheless, he assigns them to meet William Crandall (Dylan Baker), another deep-cover KGB agent who has access to U.S. research into deadly chemical and biological weapons. However, Philip pulls out from the meeting, citing a bad feeling. He later attends an EST meeting, where he opens up about his childhood, revealing that the boy he punched was a bully, but omits mentioning that he killed him. He then goes with Sandra (Susan Misner) to a bar to talk about the confession, unaware that they are seen by Tori (Callie Thorne), Stan's girlfriend. Paige (Holly Taylor) meets with Pastor Tim (Kelly AuCoin), asking for his help with her parents' situation. He proposes a meeting, promising he won't tell anyone else about their secret.

At the Soviet research facility, Anton Baklanov (Michael Aronov) confides in Nina (Annet Mahendru) that he fears repercussions if his planned stealth airplane wings fail. When Vasili Nikolaevich (Peter Von Berg) informs her that the design was successful, she asks to see her husband. At the Rezidentura, Arkady (Lev Gorn), suspicious of what Tatiana (Vera Cherny) is working on, asks Oleg (Costa Ronin) to watch over her. Using his contacts, he learns it has to do with chemical and biological weapons, warning her not to get them involved.

After the FBI discover Gene's corpse, Martha tells Philip that she appreciates that he informed her first. Seeing that he is haunted by his childhood memory, she gives William's file. Seeing that William is not under surveillance, they decide to meet him at a park. William reveals that he was working with the Department of Defense on a lab focusing on bioweapons. He provides them with a vial of Burkholderia mallei, which causes glanders, a highly contagious disease, telling them to give it to Gabriel. However, Philip is confronted by Stan as he arrives home, believing he has an affair with Sandra. As Philip denies the accusation, Stan pushes him to a wall. After Stan leaves, Philip hurriedly pulls the vial out of his pocket; it is still intact.

== Production ==
=== Development ===
In February 2016, FX confirmed that the first episode of the season would be titled "Glanders", and that it would be written by executive producer Joel Fields and series creator Joe Weisberg, and directed by Thomas Schlamme. This was Fields' 13th writing credit, Weisberg's 14th writing credit, and Schlamme's fifth directing credit.

=== Filming ===
Filming for the episode started on October 13, 2015 and wrapped by October 26, 2015.

== Reception ==
=== Viewers ===
In its original American broadcast, "Glanders" was seen by an estimated 1.11 million household viewers with a 0.3 in the 18-49 demographics. This means that 0.3 percent of all households with televisions watched the episode. This was a 10% decrease in viewership from the previous episode, which was watched by 1.22 million household viewers with a 0.3 in the 18-49 demographics.

=== Critical reviews ===
"Glanders" received critical acclaim. The review aggregator website Rotten Tomatoes reported an 100% approval rating for the episode, based on 10 reviews. The site's consensus states: "Picking up the action immediately after the previous season's finale, 'Glanders' uses the fallout from critical storylines to establish urgent momentum while furthering the main characters' journey - and further unraveling their façade."

Eric Goldman of IGN gave the episode a "great" 8.8 out of 10 and wrote in his verdict, "The Americans returned as excellent as ever. Nothing is easy for the Jennings and it's always impressive how this show manages to juggle so many elements that could so easily turn to melodrama in the wrong hands, and make them into exciting, involving and compelling drama. The way the spy world and the family world are overlapping is more profound than ever, as Paige's knowledge of their secret could blow up in their face... if they don't all die from bringing home a bio-weapon."

Erik Adams of The A.V. Club gave the episode a "B" grade and wrote, "There's no rush to resolve last season's big cliffhanger. 'Glanders' is more interested in the reverberations than the detonation, allowing the confusion and frustration to rattle around in Paige's head while Arkady stokes suspicions about Tatiana and Martha gets the news of Gene's death."

Alan Sepinwall of HitFix wrote, "Frankly, it's amazing that we've reached this point in the story with the two of them alive and free, given everything they've done and said over the years. And 'Glanders' drives this point home in both the present, where Paige's confession to Pastor Tim hangs over everything Philip and Elizabeth are doing, and in the past, where we get flashbacks to the very first time Philip murdered an innocent." Anthony Breznican of Entertainment Weekly wrote, "we see Philip head to his other home, his other bed, that of Martha, the well-meaning but somewhat gullible secretary who thought he was her husband 'Clark.' And he is. Sort of. At the very least, it becomes clear in this season premiere that he cares about her as more than just a KGB source."

Mike Hale of The New York Times wrote, "The season premiere of The Americans on Wednesday night began in darkness, literal and metaphoric. Philip lay in bed dreaming of a horrific incident from his childhood when he lost control (or did he?) and beat to death another boy who had been bullying him. The show doesn't waste time — guilt, terror and a spray of blood before the opening credits even rolled." Genevieve Koski of Vulture gave the episode a 4 star rating out of 5 and wrote, "It's safe to assume The Americans will tease out these ideas of uncertainty and disconnection even further, particularly as they apply to Philip, Paige, and the Jenningses' bioweapons mission. But 'Glanders' also introduces a host of other questions we can hope to have answered this season."

Ben Travers of IndieWire gave the episode an "A–" grade and wrote, "In case, you were hoping things somehow got easier for dear ol' Philip over the break, 'Glanders' was here to overwhelm our family patriarch even more." Matt Brennan of Slant Magazine wrote, "'Glanders' highlights Paige's profound isolation with two crafty compositions — even further evidence, if any were needed, that The Americans is as full of formal coups as any of its more flashy brethren."

Alec Bojalad of Den of Geek wrote, "Regardless, everything else on The Americans just absolutely kills. It remains a truly fantastic, thought-provoking and at times discomfiting experience." Amy Amatangelo of Paste gave the episode a 9.1 out of 10 and wrote, "what's great about this series is that it continues to zig when audiences expect it to zag. We've been waiting for a showdown between Philip and Stan. But who would have thought it would come because Stan suspected Philip of having an affair with his ex-wife?"
