= Munchkins (The Americans) =

- The Americans episode
- Episode no.: Season 4 Episode 10
- Directed by: Steph Green
- Written by: Peter Ackerman
- Cinematography by: Alex Nepomniaschy
- Editing by: Daniel Valverde
- Production code: BDU410
- Original air date: May 18, 2016
- Running time: 48 minutes

Guest appearances
- Vera Cherny as Tatiana Evgenyevna Vyazemtseva; Daniel Flaherty as Matthew Beeman; Julia Garner as Kimmy Breland; Suzy Jane Hunt as Alice; Peter Jacobson as Agent Wolfe; Ruthie Ann Miles as Young Hee Seong; Richard Kline as Bill Hanson; Rob Yang as Don Seong; Frank Langella as Gabriel

Episode chronology
← Previous "The Day After"	Next → "Dinner for Seven"
- The Americans season 4

"Munchkins" is the tenth episode of the fourth season of the American period spy drama television series The Americans. It is the 49th overall episode of the series and was written by co-producer Peter Ackerman, and directed by Steph Green. It was released on FX on May 18, 2016.

The series is set during the Cold War and follows Elizabeth and Philip Jennings, two Soviet KGB intelligence officers posing as an American married couple living in Falls Church, a Virginia suburb of Washington, D.C., with their American-born children Paige and Henry. It also explores the conflict between Washington's FBI office and the KGB Rezidentura there, from the perspectives of agents on both sides, including the Jennings' neighbor Stan Beeman, an FBI agent working in counterintelligence. In the episode, Pastor Tim goes missing in Ethiopia, and Alice suspects the Jennings were involved. Meanwhile, a KGB operation goes awry.

According to Nielsen Media Research, the episode was seen by an estimated 0.82 million household viewers and gained a 0.3 ratings share among adults aged 18–49. The episode received critical acclaim, with critics praising the writing, performances, tension and the episode's surprising death.

== Plot ==
Elizabeth (Keri Russell) dines with Young Hee (Ruthie Ann Miles) at her house, although Young Hee notes how distant Don (Rob Yang) has become. She and Philip (Matthew Rhys) later meet with Gabriel (Frank Langella), who informs them they will receive a new recruit.

The Jennings are visited by Alice (Suzy Jane Hunt), who states that Pastor Tim went missing in Ethiopia after deviating from his route. She accuses them of getting involved in his disappearance, as Ethiopia is part of the Soviet empire. She then states that she sent a tape to her lawyer, in which she disclosed the Jennings' real identity, which will be delivered to the Department of Justice if Tim is not found or if anything happens to Alice. Paige (Holly Taylor) believes her parents are involved, even when they claim otherwise. She gets angry when her parents state they would have to leave for Russia if the tape is delivered.

Stan (Noah Emmerich) and Aderholt (Brandon J. Dirden) meet their new boss, Agent Wolfe (Peter Jacobson), immediately taking a dislike to his methods. They later meet with Bill Hanson (Richard Kline), Martha's father, at a bar. Bill refuses to believe his daughter would be a KGB agent, while Aderholt notes she could've hidden her nature. In Thailand, Gaad (Richard Thomas) stays in his hotel room while his wife, Linh (Christine Toy Johnson), goes shopping. The room is invaded by three KGB agents, who want to make a deal with him. Gaad tries to escape, but he accidentally stabs himself with a window's shard of glass. When he dies, the agents are forced to leave. Arkady (Lev Gorn) is informed of this, and he expresses disdain.

During a mission to change tapes, Philip hangs out with Kimmy (Julia Garner), who confesses that her father works at the Central Intelligence Agency. Philip admonishes her for telling him a big secret like that, telling her that she should earn her father's trust. At the church, Alice informs Paige that Tim was found, safe and well. She apologizes for her reaction, asking Paige to tell her parents. Paige discloses it to Philip and Elizabeth, although she didn't ask Alice for the tape. Stan and Aderholt are dismayed upon discovering that Gaad was killed. Elizabeth meets with Gabriel, feeling conflicted over the required mission to get the access code to the lab, as it will ruin Young Hee's family.

== Production ==
=== Development ===
In April 2016, FX confirmed that the tenth episode of the season would be titled "Munchkins", and that it would be written by co-producer Peter Ackerman, and directed by Steph Green. This was Ackerman's fifth writing credit, and Green's first directing credit.

=== Filming ===
Filming for the episode wrapped by February 8, 2016.

== Reception ==
=== Viewers ===
In its original American broadcast, "Munchkins" was seen by an estimated 0.82 million household viewers with a 0.3 in the 18-49 demographics. This means that 0.3 percent of all households with televisions watched the episode. This was a 9% decrease in viewership from the previous episode, which was watched by 0.90 million household viewers with a 0.2 in the 18-49 demographics.

=== Critical reviews ===
"Munchkins" received critical acclaim. The review aggregator website Rotten Tomatoes reported an 100% approval rating for the episode, based on 15 reviews. The site's consensus states: "With 'Munchkins,' The Americans plays on overarching themes of trust and consequences with shocking twists, bleak humor, and a sudden, poignant farewell."

Erik Adams of The A.V. Club gave the episode a "B" grade and wrote, "It's a powerful, contemplative performance from Keri Russell, and the implications of her decision weigh on the closing frames of 'Munchkins.' And this question weighs on The Americans as it heads into next week's episode: Can Elizabeth trust Gabriel to honor her request?"

Alan Sepinwall of HitFix wrote, "If she's broken, and Philip's not entirely put back together, and Paige is suddenly the loudest voice in the room, well... that would be different. And fascinating. But based on what we see throughout 'Munchkins', there's not a whole lot of wiggle room in this life. Like the saying goes, in America, you choose your job; in Soviet Union, your job chooses you. Forever, if it wants." Anthony Breznican of Entertainment Weekly wrote, "Whatever they have planned for Young Hee and Don must be unspeakable."

Mike Hale of The New York Times wrote, "From the writers' perspective, perhaps the plan was simply to give Stan Beeman one more thing to be angry about." Genevieve Koski of Vulture gave the episode a perfect 5 star rating out of 5 and wrote, "When he first turns up in 'Munchkins,' it's a pleasant surprise, an unexpected denouement to a character whose arc had supposedly wrapped. When a group of heavily accented goons show up in Gaad's hotel room with a 'proposal,' it seems like The Americans may have found a way to prolong his story through the end of the season. And then it all goes out the window — literally."

Ben Travers of IndieWire gave the episode an "A–" grade and wrote, "The episode certainly didn't take it lightly but it still didn't have the same impact as Nina's death or Martha's departure. Not that it should, considering Gaad's smaller overall role, but that scene sure came by surprise. Moreover, it solidified Season 4 as one for goodbyes. Three main characters have all left, two dead and one unlikely to be seen again. With both Elizabeth and Philip mentioning their own desire to flee, we're fascinated to see where they end up at year's end." Matt Brennan of Slant Magazine wrote, "With tonight’s episode, 'Munchkins,' The Americans reopens the argument, and it appears that Paige's sense of trust has been shaken loose by the knowledge of her parents' double lives: In accepting the new 'normal' of secrets and lies, the daughter of deep-cover agents has become as suspicious as they are, and Pastor Tim's disappearance in Ethiopia forces her to examine her grim intuition once more."

Alec Bojalad of Den of Geek gave the episode a 4.5 star rating out of 5 and wrote, "There's one thing I've kept to myself as I've watched what is rightfully being regarded as The Americans' best season: I've privately worried that Philip is becoming a stronger character than Elizabeth." Amy Amatangelo of Paste gave the episode a 9.2 out of 10 and wrote, "Dear lord, this show is cruel. Vicious, cruel and excellent."
