= Dinner for Seven =

- The Americans episode
- Episode no.: Season 4 Episode 11
- Directed by: Nicole Kassell
- Written by: Joshua Brand
- Cinematography by: Alex Nepomniaschy
- Editing by: Amanda Pollack
- Production code: BDU411
- Original air date: May 25, 2016
- Running time: 43 minutes

Guest appearances
- Kelly AuCoin as Pastor Tim; Marceline Hugot as Theresa Rawlings; Suzy Jane Hunt as Alice; Ruthie Ann Miles as Young Hee Seong; Rob Yang as Don Seong; Frank Langella as Gabriel

Episode chronology
← Previous "Munchkins"	Next → "A Roy Rogers in Franconia"
- The Americans season 4

"Dinner for Seven" is the eleventh episode of the fourth season of the American period spy drama television series The Americans. It is the 50th overall episode of the series and was written by Joshua Brand, and directed by Nicole Kassell. It was released on FX on May 25, 2016.

The series is set during the Cold War and follows Elizabeth and Philip Jennings, two Soviet KGB intelligence officers posing as an American married couple living in Falls Church, a Virginia suburb of Washington, D.C., with their American-born children Paige and Henry. It also explores the conflict between Washington's FBI office and the KGB Rezidentura there, from the perspectives of agents on both sides, including the Jennings' neighbor Stan Beeman, an FBI agent working in counterintelligence. In the episode, Elizabeth's operation with Young Hee comes to an end, while the Jennings host dinner with Pastor Tim and Alice.

According to Nielsen Media Research, the episode was seen by an estimated 0.81 million household viewers and gained a 0.2 ratings share among adults aged 18–49. The episode received critical acclaim, with critics praising the episode's writing, performances, dinner scene and ending.

== Plot ==
Pastor Tim (Kelly AuCoin) visits the Jennings, apologizing for Alice's threat. He mentions how the feeling of isolation made him understand their predicament, as he feared never seeing his child. Elizabeth (Keri Russell) decides to invite Tim and Alice to dine with them later that week, which he accepts.

Gabriel (Frank Langella) informs Elizabeth that she must continue her operation with Young Hee (Ruthie Ann Miles) and Don (Rob Yang). She visits Don at his house, lying to him by claiming she is pregnant with his child. Don wants her to have an abortion, "upsetting" her.

A grieving Stan (Noah Emmerich) visits Philip (Matthew Rhys), telling him that Frank Gaad was killed by KGB agents. Later, Philip tells Elizabeth that he reported Gaad's Thailand trip to the Centre, making them question their role in his death. Stan also visits Oleg (Costa Ronin), informing him that the FBI will try to turn him and that he will stop seeing him, as he remains affected from Amador's and Gaad's deaths. That night, the Jennings dine with Pastor Tim and Alice (Suzy Jane Hunt), when Stan shows up. Henry (Keidrich Sellati) decides to invite him over. As they dine, Tim and Alice both express discomfort with Stan's job at the FBI, not revealing the Jennings' true nature.

The following day, Philip and Gabriel arrive at Don's office accompanied by an agent (Marceline Hugot), pretending to be Patty's family. They claim that Patty killed herself and Philip demands that he pay for her funeral. While Philip and Don leave for the bank, Gabriel and the agent retrieve the access code to the lab. While the operation is a success, Elizabeth is devastated as she lost her friendship with Young Hee. That night, she and Paige walk in the street when they are approached by two muggers. The muggers try to rob them and take an interest in Paige, prompting Elizabeth to knock one unconscious and kill the other with his knife. Elizabeth then leaves with a shocked Paige.

== Production ==
=== Development ===
In April 2016, FX confirmed that the eleventh episode of the season would be titled "Dinner for Seven", and that it would be written by Joshua Brand, and directed by Nicole Kassell. This was Brand's tenth writing credit, and Kassell's second directing credit.

=== Filming ===
Filming for the episode wrapped by February 22, 2016.

== Reception ==
=== Viewers ===
In its original American broadcast, "Dinner for Seven" was seen by an estimated 0.81 million household viewers with a 0.2 in the 18-49 demographics. This means that 0.2 percent of all households with televisions watched the episode. This was a slight decrease in viewership from the previous episode, which was watched by 0.82 million household viewers with a 0.3 in the 18-49 demographics.

=== Critical reviews ===
"Dinner for Seven" received critical acclaim. The review aggregator website Rotten Tomatoes reported an 94% approval rating for the episode, based on 17 reviews. The site's consensus states: "It may not be this season's most thrilling hour of The Americans, but 'Dinner for Seven' sets the table for an explosive finale."

Erik Adams of The A.V. Club gave the episode an "A" grade and wrote, "The Americans isn't the type of show to telegraph huge, tide-changing moments, but the titular scene of 'Dinner For Seven' is an exception."

Alan Sepinwall of HitFix wrote, "Including the rest of this season, we've got 25 episodes to go. I expect to feel very queasy for most of them. And I can't wait. Is that wrong?" Anthony Breznican of Entertainment Weekly wrote, "This is a bad situation. All it takes is for Pastor Tim to catch wind that Stan's with the FBI and his moral ambiguity is going to flare up again."

Mike Hale of The New York Times wrote, "Before the shock ending, it had been another in a recent series of quiet, wintry episodes. Nicole Kassell directing her second episode of the series, spent a lot of time on knowing glances and pensive looks." Genevieve Koski of Vulture gave the episode a 4 star rating out of 5 and wrote, "Elizabeth gets a firsthand lesson in this conundrum during the closing moments of 'Dinner for Seven.' In a heart-stopping sequence, Paige witnesses the full extent of her mother's, ahem, 'peacekeeping' abilities. What initially seems like a vindicating, triumphant moment curdles into something horrible and dread-soaked with the flick of a pocketknife."

Ben Travers of IndieWire gave the episode an "A" grade and wrote, "Elizabeth is in a delicate place — even if her last scene showcased her strength." Matt Brennan of Slant Magazine wrote, "A feat of meticulous craftsmanship, a subtle bait and switch, 'Dinner at Seven' frames its constituent parts as opposing forces, but in the end each element contributes to a coherent, if half-hidden, whole."

Alec Bojalad of Den of Geek gave the episode a 4.5 star rating out of 5 and wrote, "The Soviet Union, not quite knowing what skills they'd need during a lifetime undercover assignment as Americans just taught them every skill in the book: stealth, seduction, championship-level boning, all forms of combat and superior grilled-cheese sandwich making. That's why what happens at the end of 'Dinner for Seven' represents a perversion of the superhero genre as well as a very important character moment for young Paige Jennings." Amy Amatangelo of Paste gave the episode a 9.3 out of 10 and wrote, "We are all going to need therapy when this season of The Americans wraps up. Seriously. The show has gone from the nail-biting tension of the first half of the season, to the utter despair and sadness that is permeating the back-half of this season."
