= Pastor Tim =

- The Americans episode
- Episode no.: Season 4 Episode 2
- Directed by: Chris Long
- Written by: Joel Fields; Joe Weisberg
- Cinematography by: Alex Nepomniaschy
- Editing by: Amanda Pollack
- Production code: BDU402
- Original air date: March 23, 2016
- Running time: 48 minutes

Guest appearances
- Michael Aronov as Anton Baklanov; Kelly AuCoin as Pastor Tim; Gene Ravvin as Boris; David Vadim as Nikolai Timoshev; Peter Von Berg as Vasili Nikolaevich; Frank Langella as Gabriel

Episode chronology
← Previous "Glanders"	Next → "Experimental Prototype City of Tomorrow"
- The Americans season 4

"Pastor Tim" is the second episode of the fourth season of the American period spy drama television series The Americans. It is the 41st overall episode of the series and was written by executive producer Joel Fields and series creator Joe Weisberg, and directed by Chris Long. It was released on FX on March 23, 2016.

The series is set during the Cold War and follows Elizabeth and Philip Jennings, two Soviet KGB intelligence officers posing as an American married couple living in Falls Church, a Virginia suburb of Washington, D.C., with their American-born children Paige and Henry. It also explores the conflict between Washington's FBI office and the KGB Rezidentura there, from the perspectives of agents on both sides, including the Jennings' neighbor Stan Beeman, an FBI agent working in counterintelligence. In the episode, Philip meets with an airline pilot to get the vial of glanders out of the country, while Elizabeth discovers Paige told Pastor Tim about them.

According to Nielsen Media Research, the episode was seen by an estimated 0.93 million household viewers and gained a 0.3 ratings share among adults aged 18–49. The episode received critical acclaim, with critics praising the performances, character development, pacing and intrigue.

== Plot ==
After his fight with Stan (Noah Emmerich), Philip (Matthew Rhys) tells Elizabeth (Keri Russell) that he attended EST sessions with Sandra.

Philip and Elizabeth take the vial to Gabriel (Frank Langella). Surprisingly, Gabriel gives it back to them, stating that they will need more samples and that they need to continue meeting with William (Dylan Baker) as he will provide them access to the lab. However, Elizabeth discovers that Paige (Holly Taylor) told Pastor Tim (Kelly AuCoin) about their real identities, as she planted a bug in his office. Elizabeth wants to kill him, but Philip refuses, as Paige may run away. Nevertheless, Elizabeth surveils a cabin that Tim often frequents to write his sermons.

At the Soviet research facility, Nina (Annet Mahendru) reunites with her husband, Boris (Gene Ravvin). Before he leaves, she gives him a letter from Anton (Michael Aronov), asking him to deliver it to his son. However, Vasili (Peter Von Berg) informs her that the note was retrieved. He is surprised she'd risk her life for someone else, with Nina noting she changed. At the Rezidentura, Oleg (Costa Ronin) is informed by Arkady (Lev Gorn) that his brother died in the Soviet–Afghan War. Oleg later meets with Stan, who informs him there won't be a person to trade for Nina, devastating him.

Philip meets with an airline pilot, intending to give him the vial and take it out of the country. However, the mission is jeopardized when a security guard sits next to them and notes the pilot's behavior. When no one is watching, Philip strangles the guard to death. The pilot leaves, and Philip realizes that he left the vial behind. He meets with William the next day, who tells him to keep in the meantime. Elizabeth informs Paige that her mother has just died, wanting to let them know she loved them. Paige then confesses that she told Pastor Tim about their identities, angering Elizabeth. When Philip returns, Elizabeth tells him that Paige confessed. They both agree that they are in trouble.

== Production ==
=== Development ===
In February 2016, FX confirmed that the second episode of the season would be titled "Pastor Tim", and that it would be written by executive producer Joel Fields and series creator Joe Weisberg, and directed by Chris Long. This was Fields' 14th writing credit, Weisberg's 15th writing credit, and Long's first directing credit.

=== Filming ===
Filming for the episode started on October 28, 2015, and wrapped by November 6, 2015.

== Reception ==
=== Viewers ===
In its original American broadcast, "Pastor Tim" was seen by an estimated 0.93 million household viewers with a 0.3 in the 18-49 demographics. This means that 0.3 percent of all households with televisions watched the episode. This was a 17% decrease in viewership from the previous episode, which was watched by 1.11 million household viewers with a 0.3 in the 18-49 demographics.

=== Critical reviews ===
"Pastor Tim" received critical acclaim. The review aggregator website Rotten Tomatoes reported an 100% approval rating for the episode, based on 11 reviews. The site's consensus states: "'Pastor Tim' turns up the tension for the Jennings family, and for the show's viewers as well."

Eric Goldman of IGN gave the episode an "amazing" 9 out of 10 and wrote in his verdict, "An excellent episode of The Americans found the Jennings trying and failing to deal with two huge issues – the bioweapon in their house and Pastor Tim knowing the truth about them. Meanwhile, whether it be Oleg finding out his brother died or Nina trying to do a good thing that only got her in bigger trouble, there wasn't a lot of happiness for anyone. But man was it captivating to behold."

Erik Adams of The A.V. Club gave the episode a "B+" grade and wrote, "Philip Jennings took his first life when he was 10 years old. He didn't mean to: It was a retaliation against the bully who figuratively swiped food from his family's table. Twice in two episodes of The Americans' fourth season, he's confessed to the crime. Only once, in 'Pastor Tim,' has he told the version that ends with a dead body."

Alan Sepinwall of HitFix wrote, "They've all grown and changed emotionally, often for the better, but there's precious little they can do about the violent and precarious circumstances in which they live every day. Philip may eventually be able to get past the memory of the murder he committed when he was just 10, but I doubt est is going to be of much use every time Paige or Henry has control of the car radio and 'Tainted Love' comes on." Anthony Breznican of Entertainment Weekly wrote, "We don't know yet what's in store for old Pastor Tim. Maybe he'll be delivered unto his maker soon."

Mike Hale of The New York Times wrote, "The noose keeps drawing tighter around the little Jennings family — an ideologically straying husband, a willful teenager acting out, bioweapons in the garage." Genevieve Koski of Vulture gave the episode a 4 star rating out of 5 and wrote, "If Paige and unsuspecting Pastor Tim led to this much upheaval, imagine what Henry and Stan could be capable of. Better hope Henry never tears his eyes off that computer and actually notices what’s going on around him."

Ben Travers of IndieWire gave the episode an "A–" grade and wrote, "Picking up immediately after the tussle between Philip and Stan which ended last week's episode, 'Pastor Tim' was an episode bookended by revelations — specifically secrets being shared with Elizabeth." Matt Brennan of Slant Magazine wrote, "It was here, in the very first episode of The Americans, that the sight of her reflection sent her tumbling through the terror of being raped more than 20 years earlier. No trauma can remain buried, not permanently."

Alec Bojalad of Den of Geek gave the episode a 4.5 star rating out of 5 and wrote, "The Americans is able to effortlessly plunge into these emotional depths because its taken for granted that its two main characters are forever a team in every possible way. Good thing for Philip and Elizabeth too as Team Jennings has a lot to deal with in 'Pastor Tim.'" Amy Amatangelo of Paste gave the episode a 9.5 out of 10 and wrote, "The back-to-back nature of the storytelling continues to give the show such a sense of urgency—so much so that I begin the hour already stressed out. Seriously, is The Americans going to pay for my new anti-wrinkle cream? Because I am pretty sure I watched the entire episode with a furrowed brow."
