= The Day After (The Americans) =

- The Americans episode
- Episode no.: Season 4 Episode 9
- Directed by: Daniel Sackheim
- Written by: Tracey Scott Wilson
- Cinematography by: Alex Nepomniaschy
- Editing by: Sheri Bylander
- Production code: BDU409
- Original air date: May 11, 2016
- Running time: 46 minutes

Guest appearances
- Kelly AuCoin as Pastor Tim; Vera Cherny as Tatiana Evgenyevna Vyazemtseva; Daniel Flaherty as Matthew Beeman; Ruthie Ann Miles as Young Hee Seong; Rob Yang as Don Seong; Suzy Jane Hunt as Alice; Peter Mark Kendall as Hans

Episode chronology
| ← Previous "The Magic of David Copperfield V: The Statue of Liberty Disappears" | Next → "Munchkins" |
- The Americans season 4

"The Day After" is the ninth episode of the fourth season of the American period spy drama television series The Americans. It is the 48th overall episode of the series and was written by co-producer Tracey Scott Wilson, and directed by Daniel Sackheim. It was released on FX on May 11, 2016.

The series is set during the Cold War and follows Elizabeth and Philip Jennings, two Soviet KGB intelligence officers posing as an American married couple living in Falls Church, a Virginia suburb of Washington, D.C., with their American-born children Paige and Henry. It also explores the conflict between Washington's FBI office and the KGB Rezidentura there, from the perspectives of agents on both sides, including the Jennings' neighbor Stan Beeman, an FBI agent working in counterintelligence. In the episode, Elizabeth sees her friendship with Young Hee threatened with her new assignment. Everyone watches The Day After, which explores the effects of a nuclear warfare.

According to Nielsen Media Research, the episode was seen by an estimated 0.90 million household viewers and gained a 0.2 ratings share among adults aged 18–49. The episode received critical acclaim, with critics praising Keri Russell's performance and the series' exploration of The Day After.

== Plot ==
Philip (Matthew Rhys) takes Paige (Holly Taylor) to an empty parking lot to give her driving lessons. Afterwards, she says that the church is having their last meeting before a mission to Ethiopia and that Pastor Tim (Kelly AuCoin) would like to see the Jennings attend. Philip later meets with William (Dylan Baker), who reports that his lab is working on a modified version of the Lassa virus. William is disturbed by the discovery and is doubting over reporting this to the Centre.

That night, everyone watches the television film, The Day After, which explores the conflict of a nuclear exchange. Oleg (Costa Ronin) watches it with Tatiana (Vera Cherny), and recounts how a nuclear false alarm incident almost led to similar events. Philip starts to believe in William's concern, but Elizabeth (Keri Russell) says the virus will be used against them. Elizabeth continues seeing Young Hee (Ruthie Ann Miles), babysitting her children in order to find anything incriminating in their house.

Realizing she will need to seduce Don (Rob Yang) in order to find more, Elizabeth decides to move forward, even knowing that this could ruin her friendship with Young Hee. She invites him to her apartment, where she kisses him and drugs his drink to lose consciousness. When he wakes up, he finds himself in bed with a naked Elizabeth, making him believe they had sex. Horrified, he leaves. Philip accompanies Paige to the church meeting, where Pastor Tim suggests they could talk in detail after he returns from missionary work in Ethiopia. Seeing that she has felt saddened, he takes her on another driving lesson, this time on his Camaro Z-28. When Elizabeth returns, Philip comforts her, as Elizabeth feels her friendship with Young Hee is over.

== Production ==
=== Development ===
In April 2016, FX confirmed that the ninth episode of the season would be titled "The Day After", and that it would be written by co-producer Tracey Scott Wilson, and directed by Daniel Sackheim. This was Wilson's fifth writing credit, and Sackheim's seventh directing credit.

=== Filming ===
Filming for the episode wrapped by January 29, 2016.

== Reception ==
=== Viewers ===
In its original American broadcast, "The Day After" was seen by an estimated 0.90 million household viewers with a 0.2 in the 18-49 demographics. This means that 0.2 percent of all households with televisions watched the episode. This was a 12% decrease in viewership from the previous episode, which was watched by 1.02 million household viewers with a 0.3 in the 18-49 demographics.

=== Critical reviews ===
"The Day After" received critical acclaim. The review aggregator website Rotten Tomatoes reported an 100% approval rating for the episode, based on 12 reviews. The site's consensus states: "'The Day After' uses the titular 1983 TV movie as the backdrop for a reflective episode that finds The Americans catching its breath before charging headlong into the end of the season."

Erik Adams of The A.V. Club gave the episode a "B+" grade and wrote, "The morality of The Americans is rarely black-and-white, but the specter of mutually assured destruction has a way of rendering complicated issues into absolutes. After tasting freedom for more than half a year, The Day After brings the psychological toll of the Jennings' work crashing down on Elizabeth. That, and the creeping suspicion that the Young-hee operation is approaching its own point of no return."

Alan Sepinwall of HitFix wrote, "In that context, you can understand, if in no way condone or forgive, where Elizabeth was coming from when she made the stomach-churning choice she did. Damn, this show is tough. And great." Anthony Breznican of Entertainment Weekly wrote, "A big chunk of this episode is dedicated to highlights from the 1983 ABC telemovie The Day After, which explores the aftermath of a nuclear war between the United States and the Soviet Union. It was disturbing in its day – probably still is. And all the characters in The Americans tune in to watch."

Mike Hale of The New York Times wrote, "The best scene in Wednesday night's episode of The Americans on FX was a moving evocation of late-stage Cold War insecurity, as both Americans and Soviets soberly contemplated the reality of an all-out nuclear exchange. But even more powerful was its depiction of the real golden age of television — when more than 100 million people would sit down at the same time on a Sunday night to watch a really scary and depressing TV movie." Genevieve Koski of Vulture gave the episode a perfect 5 star rating out of 5 and wrote, "Philip and Paige aren't the only Jenningses feeling the effects of The Day After. Elizabeth is visibly moved by the TV movie, though it's a little tougher to parse the nuances of her reaction."

Ben Travers of IndieWire gave the episode a "B+" grade and wrote, "In addition to giving a frightening glimpse of the realities of Cold War America via the TV movie The Day After, 'The Day After' shifted emotional focus from Philip to Elizabeth, as she faced the harsh reality of her chosen profession." Matt Brennan of Slant Magazine wrote, "For a series in which the 'evil empire,' the Strategic Defense Initiative, The Today Show, and David Copperfield come to the characters via vacuum tubes and radio waves, 'The Day After' is also, fittingly enough, a tribute to the power of television: the foremost medium through which we enjoy, or endure, the experience of being alone together."

Alec Bojalad of Den of Geek gave the episode a 4 star rating out of 5 and wrote, "Season four of The Americans feels as close to a final season of a TV show that isn't actually a final season as I can remember and 'The Day After' fits in this paradigm perfectly." Amy Amatangelo of Paste gave the episode an 8.2 out of 10 and wrote, "'I'm going to miss her,' Elizabeth tells Philip mournfully about Young Hee. With only four episodes left this season, I'm already missing the show."
