= Rockaway (2017 film) =

- Directed by: John J. Budion
- Written by: John J. Budion
- Starring: Keidrich Sellati; Maxwell Apple; James DiGiacomo
- Cinematography: Matthew Santo
- Edited by: Denis Henry Hennelly
- Music by: Aaron Gilhuis
- Release date: August 2017 (Rhode Island International Film Festival)
- Running time: 83 minutes
- Country: United States
- Language: English

Rockaway is an American 2017 drama directed and written by John J. Budion.

== Plot ==
Anthony and John are two brothers who are abused by their father. John, the younger brother, suffers from seeing his mother beaten by his father.

They befriend Sal, Billy, Dom and Brian at a basketball court and spend time playing baseball together. John is noticed for his obsession with New York Knicks star John Starks. They form a close bond.

Anthony and John's mother decides to move away while the two conceive a plan of revenge against their father by slingshotting a light bulb and pushing the boiler towards him. One night, Anthony, John, and their friends watch a Knicks game; their father becomes angry after finding out his refrigerator is empty. Their friends side with the two brothers.

As the story develops, the gang keeps mentioning the movie Stand By Me. They also mention that John is just like Gordie, the kid who was a talented writer, since John is good at drawing. If Gordie had shot Ace to death, he would never have become a successful writer.

Anthony and Billy have a confrontation because Billy thinks that Anthony is no different from his father. The night before moving, the boys spend time together at Sal's house watching a Knicks game, without knowing their house is on fire. Anthony and John return to find that their mother has fainted, but Anthony saves her and later decides to save his father from the basement. However, he fails and is trapped with no way out, resulting in his and his father's deaths.

The boys grieve over Anthony's death. John leaves without telling anyone where he is going.

Twenty years later, an adult John returns to East Rockaway by train, rents a bicycle, and cycles the places where he used to stroll with the gang. He meets Dom, who now teaches in high school. He finds out that Brian, Billy and Sal, are fathers.

== Cast ==
- Keidrich Sellati as young Anthony
- Maxwell Apple as young John
- James DiGiacomo as young Dom
- Tanner Flood as young Brian
- Colin Critchley as young Sal
- Harrison Wittmeyer as young Billy
- Nolan Lyons as Bradley
- Sophia Rose as Gina
- Wass Stevens as Dad
- Marjan Neshat as Mom

== Production ==
Rockaway is the first feature film of director John Budion, who previously worked as a visual effects artist and director for television commercials. Filming took place in July 2016, with most of the shooting taking place in East Rockaway, New York.

== Release ==
Rockaway debuted at the Rhode Island International Film Festival in August 2017. After showing at festivals in 2017 and 2018, winning 9 awards including several Best Feature Film awards, the film landed a distribution deal with Gravitas Ventures and officially released worldwide in 2019. The film also attained a theatrical distributor and release with Paladin, opening at the Village East Cinema in New York City on January 11, 2019.
