= Curtis Lyons =

Curtis or Curt Lyons may refer to:

- Curtis Lyons, character in The Lyons
- Curtis Lyons (actor), as Curtis in Only You (The Americans)
- Curt Lyons, baseball player
