= Keidrich Sellati =

American actor (born 2001/02)

- Born: 2001 or 2002 (age 24–25); Colorado, U.S.
- Occupation: Actor
- Years active: 2013–present

Keidrich Sellati (born 2001 or 2002) is an American actor. He played the role of Henry Jennings in the FX television series The Americans (2013–2018) for its entire run.

== Life and career ==
Sellati has been described as having Korean, Irish, Italian, and English ancestry.

In 2013, Sellati joined the cast of the 1980s period drama The Americans as Henry Jennings, the son of two Soviet spies. He continued in the role until its final season in 2018. Referring to himself and co-star Holly Taylor, Sellati said "we were adorable, but in an ugly way". Sellati was part of The Americans ensemble that was nominated for Outstanding Performance by an Ensemble in a Drama Series at the 25th Screen Actors Guild Awards in 2019.

In 2017, Sellati portrayed Anthony in the film Rockaway. The film was about a brother plotting revenge against his abusive father and spending time in East Rockaway, New York. According to director John J. Budion, Sellati was similar to his real-life brother, and he praised the actor for conveying Anthony's feelings during the auditions. Sellati was named Best Actor at the 2018 Sunscreen Film Festival.

Sellati attended public school in New York City, graduating from high school in 2020. He has interest in cybersecurity as a career.

In 2020, Sellati played a role in Keke Palmer's "Dreamcatcher" music video.

== Filmography ==
=== Film ===
Year	Title	Role	Notes
2017	Rockaway	Young Anthony	
2022	There Are No Saints	Julio Niente	

=== Television ===
Year	Title	Role	Notes
2013–2018	The Americans	Henry Jennings	Main role
2014	Law & Order: Special Victims Unit	Daniel Summers-Maddox	1 episode
2019	The Enemy Within	Andrew Gordon	1 episode

=== Music videos ===
Year	Artist	Title
2020	Keke Palmer	"Dreamcatcher"
