= Brandon J. Dirden =

American actor

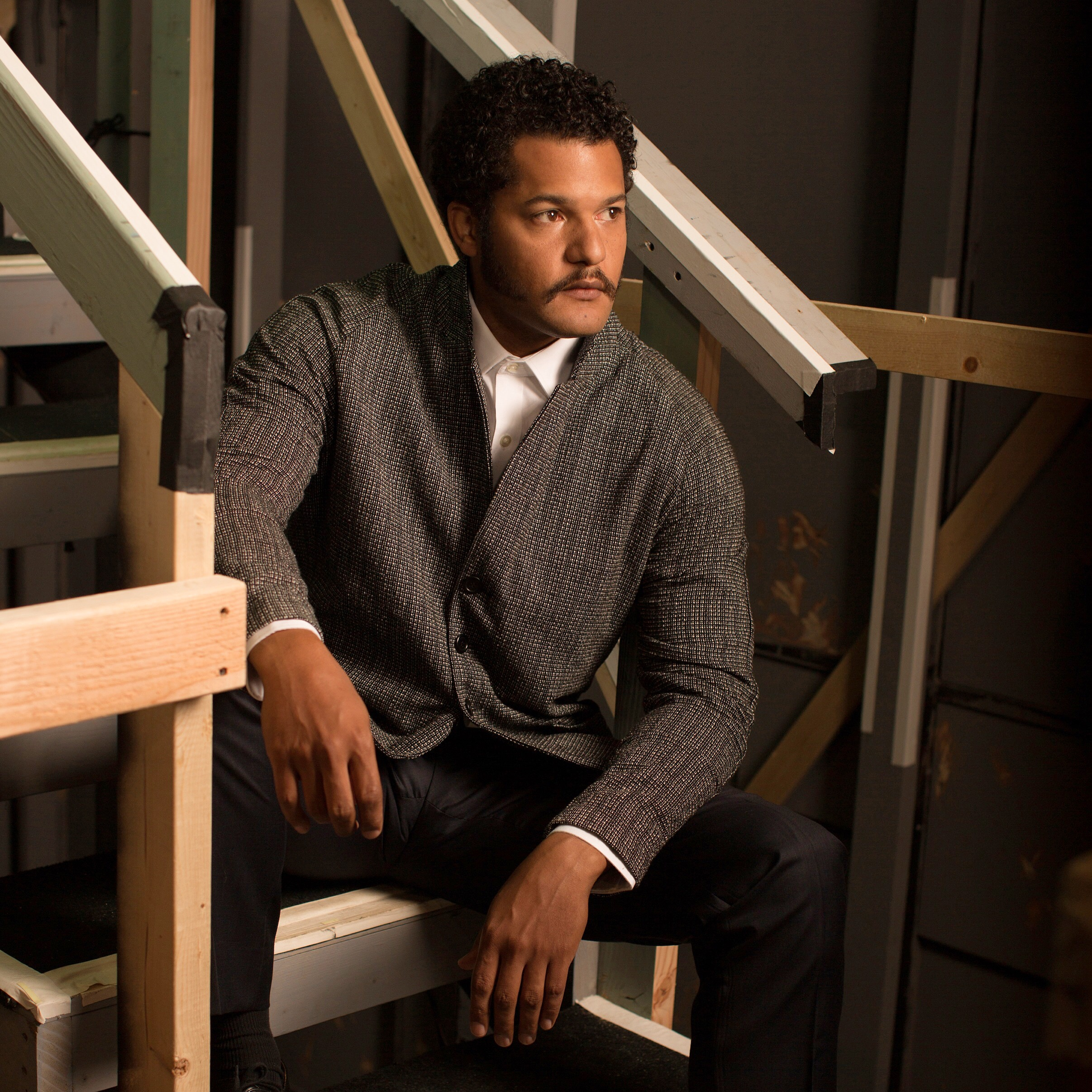
- Born: 1978 or 1979 (age 47–48)
- Education: Morehouse College (BA); University of Illinois, Urbana-Champaign (MFA)
- Occupation: Actor
- Years active: 1997–present
- Spouse: Crystal Anne Dickinson (m. 2006)
- Children: 1

Brandon J. Dirden (born 1978 or 1979) is an American actor, best known for portraying Martin Luther King Jr. in the Broadway production of Robert Schenkkan's All the Way.

== Career ==
Dirden received his bachelor's in math and drama from Morehouse College and his Master of Fine Arts in acting from the University of Illinois, Urbana-Champaign. He made his Broadway debut in Prelude to a Kiss. He has since appeared regularly both on and off Broadway in plays such as Clybourne Park, The First Breeze of Summer and Detroit 67.

In 2012, he received an OBIE Award, AUDELCO VIV Award and a Theater World Award and was nominated for The Drama League and Lucille Lortel awards for his portrayal of Boy Willie in the Signature Theatre's revival of August Wilson's The Piano Lesson. In 2017 he appeared in August Wilson's Jitney at Manhattan Theatre Club, and in 2022, appeared on Broadway in both Dominique Morisseau's Skeleton Crew and the revival of Richard Greenberg's Take Me Out. Dirden was nominated for a Drama Desk Award as Outstanding Actor in a Play for his role as Reggie in Skeleton Crew.

Dirden made his directorial debut in September 2015 directing August Wilson's Seven Guitars at Two River Theater in Red Bank, New Jersey. In 2024, he starred in August Wilson's Gem of the Ocean, also at the Two River Theater.

He played Dennis Aderholt in The Americans. Dirden has guest-starred in TV series such as The Big C, The Good Wife, and Ed Burns' Public Morals.

== Personal life ==
Dirden is married to actress Crystal A. Dickinson, whom he met while in graduate school at The University of Illinois. They have one son, Chase Ari Dirden. His brother is Jason Dirden, also an actor. They frequently appear in plays together.

== Stage credits ==
Year	Title	Role	Venue	Ref.
2007	Prelude to a Kiss	Ensemble	Broadway, American Airlines Theatre	
2010	Enron	Security Guard, Trader	Broadway, Broadhurst Theatre	
2012	Clybourne Park	Albert, Kevin (u/s)	Broadway, Walter Kerr Theatre	
2012	The Piano Lesson	Boy Willie	Off-Broadway, Signature Theatre Company	
2014	All the Way	Rev. Martin Luther King Jr.	Broadway, Neil Simon Theatre	
2017	Jitney	Booster	Broadway, Samuel J. Friedman Theatre	
2022	Skeleton Crew	Reggie	Broadway, Samuel J. Friedman Theatre	
2022	Take Me Out	Davey Battle	Broadway, Hayes Theatre	
2022	Take Me Out	Davey Battle	Broadway, Gerald Schoenfeld Theatre	
2025	Waiting for Godot	Pozzo	Broadway, Hudson Theatre	

== Awards and nominations ==
Year	Award	Category	Work	Result	Ref.
2013	Theatre World Award		The Piano Lesson	Won	
2013	Lucille Lortel Award	Lead Actor in a Play	The Piano Lesson	Nominated	
2013	Drama League Award	Distinguished Performance	The Piano Lesson	Nominated	
2013	Obie Award	Distinguished Performance	The Piano Lesson	Won	
2022	Drama Desk Award	Outstanding Actor in a Play	Skeleton Crew	Nominated	
2022	Outer Critics Circle Award	Outstanding Featured Actor in a Play	Skeleton Crew	Nominated	
2026	Tony Award	Best Featured Actor in a Play	Waiting for Godot	Nominated	
