= Alison Wright =

British actress (born 1976)

- Born: 12 July 1976 (age 50); Sunderland, Tyne and Wear, England
- Education: Lee Strasberg Theatre and Film Institute
- Occupation: Actress
- Years active: 2007–present

Alison Wright (born 12 July 1976) is an English actress. She is best known for her starring role as Martha Hanson on the FX period spy drama series The Americans (2013–2017), for which she received critical acclaim and a Primetime Emmy Award nomination in 2017. She has also acted in the Ryan Murphy limited series Feud: Bette and Joan (2017) and Hollywood (2020).

Wright's other notable roles were as Marjorie in the Amazon Prime Video crime drama series Sneaky Pete (2015–2019) and as Ruth Wardell in the TNT dystopian thriller series Snowpiercer (2020–2024). She has also appeared in various films, including The Nanny Diaries (2007), The Accountant (2016), Ask for Jane (2018), and Predator: Badlands (2025), voicing MU / TH / UR, the A.I. leader of the Weyland-Yutani Corporation.

== Early life ==
Wright was born on 12 July 1976, in Sunderland, Tyne and Wear, England, where she was raised by her adoptive parents. She began dancing and acting at a young age. She studied at the prestigious Lee Strasberg Theatre and Film Institute and The Barrow Group in New York City. She worked as a waitress while auditioning for roles.

== Career ==
Wright made her acting debut in the comedy-drama film The Nanny Diaries, released in 2007. This was followed by appearances in various short films. She made her stage debut as Molly Bhatt in the comedy play Rafta, Rafta... (2008), followed by a role in the play Marie and Bruce (2011), both at the Acorn Theatre.

In 2013, Wright made her television debut in the FX period spy drama series The Americans. Her performance as Martha Hanson, a lonely FBI secretary who is manipulated into spying for the Russians, earned high critical praise. She was promoted to a series regular for the second season, which premiered in January 2014. In 2017, she received a Primetime Emmy Award nomination for Outstanding Guest Actress in a Drama Series for her guest appearance in The Americans fifth season. The series ended after six seasons in 2018.

From 2015 to 2019, Wright starred as Marjorie in the Amazon Prime Video crime drama series Sneaky Pete, receiving positive reviews.

In 2016, she starred as Justine in the action thriller film The Accountant and as Virginia Thomas in the HBO political thriller film Confirmation.

In 2017, she starred as Pauline Jameson, the assistant to Robert Aldrich, in the FX docudrama series Feud: Bette and Joan, which chronicles the rivalry between Hollywood actresses Bette Davis and Joan Crawford during and after the production of the 1962 film What Ever Happened to Baby Jane?. She also made her Broadway debut as Jessie in the play Sweat at Studio 54.

In 2018, she had a starring role as Ada in the historical drama film Ask for Jane and as Emilia in a stage production of the Shakespearean tragedy play Othello at Delacorte Theater. In 2019, she had a recurring role in the second season of psychological horror anthology series Castle Rock. She starred as Valerie, a "kind-hearted local who explores the town’s evil history".

In 2020, Wright began a starring role in the TNT post-apocalyptic dystopian thriller series Snowpiercer (2020–2022), based on the 2013 film of the same name by Bong Joon-ho. She played Ruth Wardell, a hospitality worker aboard the train who helps look after First Class passengers. Also that year, she made a guest appearance as Ms. Roswell, the gatekeeper to Ace Studios, in the Netflix period drama miniseries Hollywood.

== Acting credits ==
=== Film ===
Year	Title	Role	Notes
2007	The Nanny Diaries	Bridget	
2009	Nights	Bartender	Short film
2011	Braaains!	Monique Gold	Short film
2015	Good Ol' Boy	Mrs. Reynolds	
2016	The Accountant	Justine	
2017	Active Adults	Therapist	
2018	Ask for Jane	Ada	
2019	Georgica	Sophie	Short film
2021	Biscuit	—N/a	Short film; post-production
2025	The Accountant 2	Justine	
2025	Predator: Badlands	MU/TH/UR	Voice-only

=== Television ===
Year	Title	Role	Notes
2013–2017	The Americans	Martha Hanson	37 episodes
2013	Blue Bloods	Brijita Holden	Episode: "Lost and Found"
2015–2019	Sneaky Pete	Marjorie	14 episodes
2016	Confirmation	Virginia Thomas	Television film
2017	Feud: Bette and Joan	Pauline Jameson	7 episodes
2019	Castle Rock	Valerie	6 episodes
2020–2024	Snowpiercer	Ruth Wardell	40 episodes
2020	Hollywood	Ms. Roswell	Episode: "Hooray for Hollywood"
2022	Physical	Luanne	Episode: "Don't You Want to Get Better"
2024	Feud: Capote vs. The Swans	Pamela Harriman	Episode: "Masquerade 1966"
2024	The Madness	Julia Jayne	4 episodes

=== Theater ===
Year	Title	Role	Venue	Ref.
2008	Rafta, Rafta...	Molly Bhatt	Acorn Theatre	
2011	Marie and Bruce	Performer	Acorn Theatre	
2017	Sweat	Jessie	Studio 54	
2018	Othello	Emilia	Delacorte Theater	

== Awards and nominations ==
Year	Award	Category	Work	Result	Ref.
2016	OFTA Television Awards	Best Supporting Actress in a Drama Series	The Americans	Nominated	
2017	Satellite Awards	Best Supporting Actress in a Series, Miniseries, or Television Film	The Americans	Nominated	
2017	Primetime Emmy Awards	Outstanding Guest Actress in a Drama Series	The Americans	Nominated	
2017	OFTA Television Awards	Best Guest Actress in a Drama Series	The Americans	Nominated	
2019	Drama Desk Awards	Outstanding Featured Actress in a Play	Othello	Nominated	
2021	Critics' Choice Super Awards	Best Actress in an Action Series	Snowpiercer	Nominated	
2022	Critics' Choice Super Awards	Best Actress in a Science Fiction/Fantasy Series	Snowpiercer	Nominated	
