= Stan Beeman =

- The Americans character
- First appearance: "Pilot"
- Last appearance: "START"
- Created by: Joe Weisberg
- Portrayed by: Noah Emmerich

In-universe information
- Occupation: FBI agent
- Spouses: Sandra Beeman (divorced); Renee
- Children: Matthew Beeman

Stanley Beeman is a fictional character in the American television drama series The Americans on FX. He was created by series creator Joe Weisberg and is portrayed by Noah Emmerich. Stan is an FBI agent and a neighbor of the lead characters, Elizabeth (Keri Russell) and Philip Jennings (Matthew Rhys), who are undercover Soviet spies.

== Character history ==
=== Season one ===
Stan is an FBI counter-intelligence agent and moves to Northern Virginia with his wife, Sandra (Susan Misner) and his son, Matthew (Daniel Flaherty) across the street from Elizabeth (Keri Russell) and Philip Jennings (Matthew Rhys). Stan is unaware of the fact that Philip and Elizabeth are undercover KGB agents but becomes suspicious when he learns that a car similar to Philip's is seen near the site of a Soviet defector's abduction; he covertly inspects Philip's trunk but finds nothing.

In the second episode, Stan blackmails Nina Sergeevna Krilova (Annet Mahendru), a Soviet embassy clerk, to spy for the FBI. Nina feeds Stan information about a Soviet agent who was killed the night Timochev went missing. As Stan gets to know Nina, he subsequently grows further apart from Sandra due to how much he works and is not able to spend time with his family. After Stan misses a family dinner due to work, a co-worker takes him to a bar and tells him to pick out a woman to have casual sex with. Stan instead calls Nina and they sleep together, but the way Nina conducts herself leads him to believe that she is using Stan and may be a double agent. She is tasked to try and turn Stan but starts to fall in love with him instead. Agent Frank Gaad (Richard Thomas), Stan's FBI supervisor, gives him the keys to a safe house and tells him to take Nina there, which then becomes their "love nest".

Stan's partner Chris Amador (Maximiliano Hernández) is abducted and killed by Philip and Elizabeth. On Stan's unauthorized initiative, the FBI retaliate by seizing Arkady's young assistant Vlad Kosygin (intending to apprehend Arkady himself). After Amador turns up dead, Stan murders Vlad as revenge. The FBI find evidence linking Amador's death to drug dealer Gregory Thomas (a KGB agent and Elizabeth's former lover); the KGB frame Gregory to cut their losses, and he subsequently commits suicide by cop. When Nina asks about Vlad's death, Stan lies and promises her he will find out who killed him. When he gets home, Sandra asks him to quit the FBI and move. When he says no, she leaves him. He goes to Nina and attempts to end their affair, but ends up losing his resolve and sleeps with her instead. Nina does not trust what Stan is telling her about Vlad's death and after she gets promoted, she is given access to the material obtained by the Weinberger bug. She keeps the information from Stan in order to further investigate Vlad's death. Stan and Gaad continue to look for a thirty-something married couple and produce a sketch of them while Nina is sworn into Directorate S and, after a conversation with Stan, confesses her spying to Arkady and offers to become a re-doubled agent. Stan tells both Sandra and Nina that his mission will soon be over but Sandra rebuffs his attempt at reconciliation and Nina tells Arkady, who has accepted her offer in spite of Moscow's skepticism.

=== Season two ===
Nina informs Stan of a new arrival at the Rezidentura, Oleg Burov (Costa Ronin). Stan follows Oleg one night, only to have Oleg lead him to a port where he tells Stan that he is the only one who knows about Nina and threatens to expose her. Stan asks Nina to take a polygraph test if she wants to get exfiltrated. Arkady forces Stan's hand to steal the "Echo" program in exchange for Nina's safety. When Oleg pressures Stan more, Stan gives a surveillance log to Oleg and later promises to protect Nina. He drops a package at the agreed location, but it turns out to be only a note that says "Tell Nina I'm sorry". A heartbroken Nina leaves the Rezidentura to return to Moscow to stand trial for treason while Stan sadly watches her leave from a parked car.

=== Season three ===
Gaad informs Stan that Nina has been charged with espionage and treason. Stan tries again to reconcile with Sandra, trying to understand the EST she has been going to. He attends a session and asks Philip to go as well. Stan finds the training ridiculous and useless, much to Sandra's annoyance. Stan later goes back to an EST meeting, only to voice his opinion of it. Instead of being met with hostility, he gets applauded. Afterwards, he is asked out on a date by a woman named Tori (Callie Thorne), also from the meeting. They have dinner at the Jennings house and, despite admitting that he still considers Sandra his wife, he and Tori have sex. He eventually accepts that his marriage to Sandra is ending, and they agree to divorce.

Stan is tasked with ensuring the safety of Zinaida Preobrazhenskaya (Svetlana Efremova), a defector from the Soviet Institute for US and Canadian Studies. Zinaida behaves cheerful and appreciative of American culture while accompanied by Stan, though he suspects she may be an undercover spy for the Russians. Stan is later confronted by Oleg, who blames him for Nina's arrest and upcoming execution; Stan relays to Oleg his suspicions about Zinaida and enlists his help in proving it, hoping to initiate a prisoner exchange for Nina. Despite initial doubts, Oleg confirms Stan's suspicions and Zinaida is arrested, but is instead exchanged for a different CIA asset that the United States deemed more valuable than Nina. Stan is nearly fired from the FBI after he admits his dealings with Oleg to Gaad, presenting a tape he recorded of Oleg admitting Zinaida's allegiance to the USSR. However, the Deputy Attorney General instead commends Stan for turning Oleg into a potential asset and has him continue the relationship.

During this time, Stan forms a friendship with Dennis Aderholt, a new member of the FBI's counterintelligence division. Aderholt uncovers a bug inside Gaad's office that, unbeknownst to them, was planted by Gaad's secretary Martha Hanson (Alison Wright) under instructions from an undercover Philip. Stan begins to suspect Martha, but the case is seemingly closed after Philip murders Gene Craft, the FBI's IT specialist, and plants evidence in his home framing him as the mole.

=== Season four ===
Tori tells Stan she saw Philip and Sandra on a date following an EST meeting. Stan, believing that Philip is sleeping with Sandra, angrily rebukes him despite Philip's pleas of innocence. Stan is later informed by Oleg that Nina has been executed in Russia. Stan is stunned and devastated, despite knowing that he is to expect the loss of an asset. Philip soon reconciles with Stan, who forgives him.

Stan and Aderholt continue to investigate Martha, who concocts a story to Aderholt about being in a relationship with a married man (to explain away her suspicious behavior). Stan and Aderholt attempt to track down Martha's lover and obtain the name and police sketch of "Clark Westerfeld" (who, unbeknownst to them, is the identity Philip has been using to get close to Martha). They soon discover that "Clark Westerfeld" is a fake identity and relay their findings to a stunned Gaad, who orders a manhunt for Martha. However, the KGB manage to exfiltrate Martha to the Soviet Union before the FBI can apprehend her. The discovery that his secretary married a KGB officer forces Gaad to resign from the FBI in disgrace.

Seven months pass, with Stan maintaining his friendship with the Jennings (which includes a close, fatherly bond with their son Henry). One night, Stan unexpectedly joins the Jennings for dinner with Pastor Tim, the head of Paige's church (and who is aware of the Jennings' true identities). Stan additionally learns that Gaad has died while living in retirement in Thailand, and begins to suspect he was murdered by the KGB.

With the FBI attempting to pressure Stan into leveraging his relationship with Oleg for information, Stan ends his correspondence with Oleg, citing potential guilt over the loss of another source. However, Oleg later meets with Stan to disclose the KGB's attempts to develop biological weapons, fearing that the Soviet Union is not equipped to handle such dangerous pathogens. Oleg's tip enables Stan and the FBI to identify William Crandall (Dylan Baker) as a KGB illegal operating out of a government research institute in Washington. However, William infects himself with a sample of the Lassa virus and is placed in a biocontainment treatment center. As he dies, William reminisces to Stan and Aderholt about the crushing loneliness of his job as a KGB illegal; he indirectly discusses the Jennings, saying: "couple kids, American dream. You'd never suspect them. She's pretty... he's lucky."

=== Season five ===
Stan meets a woman named Renee at the gym and begins dating her, though Philip privately suspects she may be a KGB agent. Renee later moves in with him. Additionally, Stan is supportive of his son Matthew's relationship with Paige Jennings, though the two soon break up.

With Oleg back in Russia, Stan and Aderholt struggle to find new sources from the Soviet Union. They eventually meet a TASS employee named Sofia Kovalenko, who agrees to inform for them in exchange for money as well as a guarantee for her family's safety. Sofia soon becomes engaged to Gennadi Bystrov, a former Soviet hockey star who now carries confidential diplomatic packages to the U.S. Stan and Aderholt initially worry that Sofia's cover has been blown, but Gennadi meets with Stan and assures him he can be trusted to help the FBI.

The FBI continues pressuring Stan to blackmail Oleg using the tape he made a year prior. Stan, unwilling to betray Oleg, meets with the Deputy Attorney General and threatens to publicly admit to killing Vlad Kosygin unless the FBI and CIA stop targeting Oleg.

=== Season six ===
Three years after the events of season five, Stan has married Renee and has moved out of the counterintelligence division spare for his and Aderholt's ongoing handling of Sofia and Gennadi. Stan learns from Aderholt – now the chief of counterintelligence – that Oleg is in D.C., ostensibly to take a class on urban transport planning. Stan meets Oleg in his hotel and warns him that he is not under diplomatic protection should he be arrested for whatever he is really doing in the States.

Stan and Aderholt become wary of Sofia's trustworthiness after learning that she discussed her dealings with the FBI with a man she met at work. Worried that their sources have been compromised, Stan and Aderholt pick up Gennadi, Sofia and her young son Ilya to grant them political asylum elsewhere in the U.S. The KGB learn about the FBI's new Russian source and begin tailing Stan to locate Gennadi. Elizabeth later breaks into Gennadi's home, but is forced to kill him and Sofia after being discovered, though she leaves Ilya alive. A devastated Stan tells Philip about discovering the double-murder and orphaned child.

Aderholt tells Stan that one of Gennadi's diplomatic packages contained a radiation sensor chip from a company in Chicago, which leads them to a KGB illegal codenamed "Harvest" (who is currently under FBI surveillance). Aderholt convinces Stan to lead a counterintelligence effort to track down leads in D.C. based on "Harvest's" tradecraft. While away in Chicago on a mission to extract "Harvest", Elizabeth misses Thanksgiving dinner at Stan's house, which he finds odd; Philip tells him the travel agency business is failing, and has Stan look after Henry while he leaves town to assist Elizabeth. Henry tells Stan he never met either parent's extended family, though Paige has. Stan ponders why the Jennings are so frequently away at late hours and breaks into their house while they are away, recalling William's description of a spy couple with two children. However, he finds nothing apart from numerous discarded cigarettes in their backyard.

Stan presents a photo of Elizabeth to one of Gregory's former associates, who does not recognize her from the photo, but does recall Gregory's lover as a beautiful woman who smoked incessantly. Stan then calls Pastor Tim in Buenos Aires, who does not disclose his knowledge of the Jennings' identities. Stan relays his suspicions to Aderholt, who is initially incredulous. The FBI arrest Oleg for espionage after they catch him picking up a dead drop left by Philip; Oleg tells Stan that he was trying to thwart the KGB's planned coup against President Gorbachev, and urges him to relay the dead drop message to the USSR.

The FBI learn that Father Andrei, a minister at the Russian Orthodox Church, is a KGB affiliate, and begin tailing him, with Philip narrowly evading capture. The FBI begin staking out garages across Washington to entrap the illegals. Stan calls Philip both at home and work, but is unable to reach him. He leaves an FBI stakeout to watch Paige's apartment, and sees Philip and Elizabeth (who are preparing to flee to the Soviet Union) arrive to pick her up. He confronts them in the parking garage, where Philip finally admits their status as Russian agents to a heartbroken Stan. He tells Stan they were working to protect Gorbachev from a coup and asks that he allow them to send their information back to the Soviet Union, which Stan realizes is linked to what Oleg told him. Paige and Philip ask Stan to look after Henry, whom they must abandon. Stan ultimately permits the Jennings to leave; before departing, Philip tells him he suspects that Renee may be a spy. A crushed Stan returns to work, where Aderholt presents drawings (based on information from Father Andrei) confirming that the illegals are Philip and Elizabeth. Stan later visits Henry at school and tells him the truth about his parents, and decides to stay with Renee despite Philip's suspicions.

== Casting ==
Emmerich was initially hesitant about taking a role in the series. He explained: "The truth is, from the very beginning, I thought, "I don't want to do a TV show where I carry a gun or a badge. I'm done with guns and badges. I just don't want to do that anymore." When I first read it I thought, "Yeah, it's really interesting and really good, but I don't want to be an FBI guy." His friend, Gavin O'Connor, who directed the pilot episode, convinced him to take a closer look at the role. Emmerich stated that "within 20 minutes of talking to Joe, it became abundantly clear that his interests were not procedural".

== Reception ==
The character of Stan Beeman and Noah Emmerich's performance have received critical acclaim. Slate called Stan "the show's most heartbreaking character," with being a victim of his own work ethic, losing a partner, losing his marriage, becoming estranged from his son, and falling in love with a double agent. Emmerich said of Beeman, "He's pretty much losing everything in his life. His extracurricular life is in a Russian prison, his wife is leaving him, his son won't talk to him. What more can go wrong? It's tough. But hopefully it's the nadir of Stan's troubles. He's about to bounce back strong and hard—that's my hope for Stan."

For his role as Stan, Emmerich was nominated at the 2013 Critics' Choice Television Awards for Best Supporting Actor in a Drama Series but lost out to Michael Cudlitz.
