= Philip Jennings (The Americans) =

- The Americans character
- First appearance: "Pilot"
- Last appearance: "START"
- Created by: Joe Weisberg
- Portrayed by: Matthew Rhys

In-universe information
- Occupation: KGB agent
- Spouses: Elizabeth Jennings; Martha Hanson (not legally married)
- Children: Paige Jennings; Henry Jennings; Mischa Semenov

Philip Jennings (real name Mikhail (called Mischa); Russian: Михаил/Миша) is a fictional character in the American television drama series The Americans on FX, and the male lead. He was created by series creator Joe Weisberg and is portrayed by Welsh actor Matthew Rhys. Philip is a highly trained agent from the KGB's Illegals Programme and, along with Elizabeth (Keri Russell), poses as an American citizen, working as a travel agent in Washington, D.C.

== Character history ==
=== Early history ===
Philip was born as Mikhail in Tobolsk. His father was a guard at a local prison camp, who died when Philip was six years old; his mother's history is unknown. In the first episode of season 4, Philip describes being attacked by gangs at a young age while collecting milk across the city. One day he fought back, and stoned one of the bullies to death. As a teenager, Philip dated a young Russian woman named Irina, who shared his dream of joining the KGB. When Philip is accepted into the Illegals Program (where KGB agents live permanently undercover in the US, posing as American citizens), Irina breaks up with him and tells him that she's met someone else. Later, Irina also joins the KGB as an undercover agent in Europe. Philip trains for several years before meeting "Elizabeth Jennings", another member of the Illegals Program, who is assigned to be his wife in America. They move to Virginia in 1965 and have their first child, Paige, in 1967.

=== Season one ===
In 1981, Philip Jennings lives with his wife, Elizabeth, outside of Washington, D.C., with whom he owns and operates a travel agency ("Dupont Circle Travel"). They are revealed to be a pair of sleeper agents working for the KGB. They have two children, Paige and Henry.

Philip, Elizabeth and a third KGB operative kidnap a defected KGB agent, Nikolai Timoshev, who is revealed to have raped Elizabeth years ago when she was in training. At the time of Timoshev's kidnapping, FBI counter-intelligence agent Stan Beeman moves in next door, causing Philip to suggest defecting themselves, but Elizabeth refuses. Philip murders Timoshev when he finds out he raped her. Elizabeth and Philip try to become a real married couple, but after finding out Elizabeth had an ongoing affair with Gregory Thomas (Derek Luke), a former Black activist whom she recruited for the KGB, he is hurt. Elizabeth tells Philip that she is beginning to feel love for him for the first time in their 16-year relationship.

Philip has become genuine friends with Stan, who he initially befriended because he was a counter-intelligence agent. He begins a relationship with Martha Hanson, an FBI secretary, who knows him under the name Clark Westerfeld. He uses his relationship with her to keep tabs on what the FBI is working on. Philip and Elizabeth plant a bug in Secretary of Defense Caspar Weinberger's office, and begin listening for vital intelligence. After a mole in the KGB is realized, Elizabeth and Philip are kidnapped and tortured by KGB operatives posing as FBI agents. Philip realises that because Elizabeth's torturing stops and wasn't as physical as his, it was she who told the KGB that he considered defecting. Philip is upset that Elizabeth trusts the KGB more than she trusts him.

Philip rekindles his youth romance with Irina during an assignment in New York. She tells him that she gave birth to his son shortly after he joined the Illegals Program, and that she hid this from him so that he would be free to follow his dream. She suggests they leave the KGB and run away together. Philip declines, not believing he fathered a child with her. He returns to Elizabeth, who tells him she would like them to work on their relationship, to which Philip agrees, but decides not to tell Elizabeth about Irina. SHE soon finds out, however, and she and Philip temporarily separate, with Philip moving into a motel.

After leaving Martha's apartment one morning, FBI agent Chris Amador (Stan's partner and Martha's ex-boyfriend), attacks Philip and is himself stabbed in the process. Despite Philip and Elizabeth's best attempts to keep him alive, he dies in his sleep. Gregory is soon fingered to the FBI. He commits suicide by cop. Later, Philip helps Elizabeth kidnap a CIA officer who had ordered the murder of a Soviet general, but after she does not go through with killing him, they let him go, and the CIA officer is able to identify them as a white couple.

Philip quickly marries Martha in an attempt to get her to bug her boss's office after Elizabeth finds out that a United States Air Force colonel has information on the SDI missile defense project. Despite not hearing anything about a setup with the bug, Philip does not believe its authenticity and takes the meeting with the Colonel, where he tells Philip the schematics are 50 years away from being possible. Elizabeth goes to collect the Weinberger tape, with the FBI ready to arrest whoever shows up for it. Philip realizes this and collects Elizabeth in time, but she is shot when the FBI open fire on them. After Elizabeth's surgery, she tells Philip in Russian to "come home".

=== Season two ===
Elizabeth recovers at a remote safe-house and returns to the Jennings house. She resumes work with Philip, as they are assigned to join the Connors, another spy couple, on a mission. When they find the Connors murdered, Elizabeth and Philip become paranoid. She locks down the house and suggests he tries to glean information from Martha, his FBI informant. Philip goes to kidnap a Refusenik scientist living in the Washington area, and the Israelis save the scientist only to have the Mossad protect him. However he and Elizabeth kidnap the Mossad agent and trade him for the scientist as well as the Soviet Union letting 1500 Jews go to Israel.

=== Season six ===
At the beginning of the final season (set in 1987, about three years after the preceding season), Philip is shown as having retired from his KGB work (except for maintaining his relationship with Kimmy, the daughter of a CIA official, in order to keep a surveillance bug on him running). He continues to live undercover with Elizabeth, who remains an active KGB agent. Philip is focusing on the travel agency, which he has enlarged recently, but which develops financial difficulties, jeopardizing the tuition payments for Henry's final year at his elite boarding school and forcing Philip to fire some long-time employees.

== Personality ==
Philip has expressed doubts about "the cause" throughout the series, in contrast to Elizabeth. Nevertheless, he remains committed to it and is one of the KGB's most expert field agents. Like Elizabeth, he is seen ruthlessly killing many times, but, unlike her, he develops ethical concerns about it.

Philip is depicted as a very attentive father, and it means a lot to him to make sure his children are happy and taken care of.

Philip becomes very angry with Paige when she becomes very religious, partly due to the fact that she becomes disrespectful when her parents do not approve. He is shown to be usually very rational and level-headed, but is prone to infrequent emotional outbursts.

Philip loves playing hockey with Henry, and playing racquetball with his friend Stan Beeman. Even though Stan has played racquetball much longer than Philip, Philip picks up on the game quickly and starts beating Stan with ease.

In season 3, he starts attending EST (Erhard Seminars Training) meetings for reasons initially unknown to him, but later feels more in touch with his emotions. However, when season 3 comes to a close, Philip realizes the negativity of his emotions and thoughts, and feels he cannot work for the KGB anymore when he is forced to kill a man to protect Martha's cover. He is interrupted when Elizabeth focuses on Ronald Reagan's Evil Empire speech instead of him.

In season 4, Philip has depression. He realizes he is not as important as he thought he was in the KGB, and he struggles with Paige when she becomes aware of their activities. He disapproves of her relationship with Stan's son Matthew Beeman.

== Casting ==
Rhys spoke about what attracted him to the role of Philip: "He's a sort of gift of a part in that he's very sort of layered and multi-faceted. And when you meet him, he's at this great turning point in his life where everything's changing for him. You just get to do everything. You get to do the kung fu, and you get to do the emotional scenes, you get to do the disguises. It's the full package for an actor. It's a dream."

== Reception ==
For his portrayal, Rhys has been nominated for the Primetime Emmy Award for Outstanding Lead Actor in a Drama Series, winning once, and for three Critics' Choice Television Awards for Best Actor in a Drama Series and three TCA Awards for Individual Achievement in Drama. He is referenced in season 4 episode 16 of Supergirl.
