= Elizabeth Jennings (The Americans) =

- The Americans character
- First appearance: "Pilot"
- Last appearance: "START"
- Created by: Joe Weisberg
- Portrayed by: Keri Russell

In-universe information
- Aliases: Elizabeth Jennings; Jennifer Westerfeld; Jackie Mackelhan; Frances Raysens; Patty Rawlings; Ann Chadwick; Kelly Mainstill; Laura Gering; Dee Eckert; Stephanie; Ms. Lefler; Michelle; Wendy
- Occupation: KGB agent
- Spouse: Philip Jennings
- Children: Paige Jennings; Henry Jennings

Elizabeth Jennings (real name Nadezhda; Russian: Надежда) is a fictional character in the American television drama series The Americans on FX, as the female lead. Her character was conceived by showrunner Joe Weisberg and is portrayed by Keri Russell.

Elizabeth is a KGB agent who, with her husband Philip (Matthew Rhys), is a member of the KGB's Illegals Program, posing as a travel agent in Washington, D.C.

== Character history ==
=== Background ===
Elizabeth was born Nadezhda in Smolensk in 1942/43, the daughter of a coal miner and a bookkeeper for the local Communist Party committee. She was named after the wife of Vladimir Lenin. Her family suffered great privation both during and after the Great Patriotic War, in which her father was killed during fighting in Stalingrad. Elizabeth grew up believing her father to be one of the honored war dead, until her mother revealed that he had actually been shot as a deserter. When she was 14 her mother was bedridden with diphtheria, forcing Elizabeth to nurse her while still attending school.

As a teenager, the KGB approached Elizabeth as a candidate for the Illegals Program. Although prohibited from telling anyone, Elizabeth surreptitiously managed to consult with her mother about her decision, who unhesitatingly told her that she must do her duty for her motherland. She trained to become an undercover agent until the age of 22, and was assigned the identity of "Elizabeth Korman". During this time, she was raped by one of her captains in the KGB, Timoshev. In 1962, Elizabeth and fellow KGB agent "Philip Jennings" (Mischa) were assigned to each other to pose as husband and wife in America. In 1965, they moved to America under their false identities as Mr. and Mrs. Jennings and take up work in a travel agency. Elizabeth meets and recruits civil rights activist Gregory to the KGB and has an ongoing affair with him. She gives birth to her and Philip's first child, Paige, in 1967, and their second child, Henry, in 1970.

=== Season one ===
In 1981, Elizabeth Jennings lives with her husband Philip in suburban Falls Church, Virginia. They are revealed to be a pair of sleeper agents working for the KGB. They have two U.S.-born children, Paige and Henry, both of whom are completely unaware of their parents' true identities. The Jenningses run a small travel agency in Dupont Circle as a cover for their illegal activities.

After a failed forced exfiltration, Elizabeth and Philip kidnap Timoshev, a defected KGB agent, who raped Elizabeth when she was in training. At the time of Timoshev's kidnapping, counter-intelligence FBI agent Stan Beeman moves next door, causing Philip to suggest defecting themselves. Elizabeth declines and Philip murders Timoshev when he finds out he raped her. Despite a marriage arranged by the KGB, Elizabeth tells Philip that she is beginning to feel love for him for the first time in their 16-year relationship and they try to become a real married couple. However, Philip is hurt upon discovering Elizabeth had an ongoing affair with Gregory Thomas (Derek Luke), a Black militant.

After planting a bug in Caspar Weinberger's study, the Jenningses listen for vital intelligence. When the KGB begin to suspect a mole in their midst, they send operatives posing as FBI agents to kidnap and torture Elizabeth and Philip in order to test their loyalty. Elizabeth is hurt and angry that the people to whom she has devoted her life could treat her with such distrust, while Philip accuses Elizabeth of incurring the KGB's suspicions by reporting to them he had considered defecting. She denies this, admitting only that she had told their handlers that he liked living in the U.S. more than he should. Elizabeth and Philip later reconcile, but subsequently separate when Elizabeth discovers Philip had an affair with his former girlfriend, Irina. Philip moves out and into a motel.

Philip accidentally murders Stan's partner, Agent Chris Amador, during a botched operation, which causes Gregory to fall under the suspicion of the FBI regarding his involvement in the killing. Unwilling to go along with the KGB's plan to send him out of the country, Gregory spends a final night with Elizabeth and then commits suicide by cop to deflect attention from her. Later, Elizabeth's mentor, General Victor Zhukov, is assassinated under orders from a CIA officer, whom Elizabeth and Philip track down. Elizabeth brings the CIA officer into a bathroom for sex, and she and Philip kidnap him and bring him to a warehouse in order to kill him, but Elizabeth, still upset about Zhukov's death, decides to let him go, whereupon the CIA officer gives the FBI a vague description of her and Philip.

Elizabeth learns from her informant, Sanford Prince, that he has secured a meeting with a United States Air Force colonel who has information on the SDI project. The FBI learn of the bug in Weinberger's study and provide the KGB with disinformation through it. Philip is unsure of the meeting with the Colonel and attends in her place (against her wishes), while Elizabeth goes to pick up the Weinberger tape. Philip finds out Elizabeth's mission is compromised and picks her up just as the FBI are closing in on her, but she is shot by Stan when the FBI begin firing on them. After Elizabeth's surgery, she tells Philip in Russian to "come home".

=== Season two ===
Elizabeth recovers at a remote safe-house and returns home in time for Henry's 11th birthday. However, the celebration is cut short, as she and Philip must go meet the Connors, another spy couple, but promise a "birthday weekend" at an amusement park. The Connors surprise Philip by involving him (and, unwittingly, Henry) in a supposedly safe mission during their visit, handing him a key to their hotel room to rendezvous when the operation is complete. When Elizabeth and Philip find all but one of the Connors family shot to death in their room, they become paranoid. Elizabeth locks down the house and suggests Philip tries to glean information from Martha, his FBI informant.

Meanwhile, Elizabeth learns that her daughter, Paige, has become deeply involved in a church that is active in liberal political causes. Elizabeth's reactions are mixed; on the one hand, she is pleased with Paige's growing awareness, but remains uncomfortable with its religious overtones. Upon discovering that her daughter has given all her savings to the church, Elizabeth punishes her by waking her up at 2 AM on a school night and forcing her to clean the house.

In the season finale, Elizabeth is shocked to learn of the Center's plans to create a second generation of illegals composed of the U.S.-born children of KGB operatives indoctrinated and trained to infiltrate the American security agencies. The Connors' son, Jared, was the first to be contacted, with disastrous results—when his parents strenuously objected to his involvement in their espionage work, he killed them and his sister to protect his mission. Despite this tragedy, the Center tells the Jennings that it intends to continue with the program and that it expects them to begin grooming Paige. Both of the Jennings are horrified at first, but Elizabeth begins to warm to the idea, reasoning that Paige needs a cause to devote her life to and that she should know her parents' true identities and, by extension, her own.

== Personality ==
Elizabeth grew up in poverty, and she developed a hard and icy exterior like her mother. The first 15 years of her marriage with Philip were relatively loveless. Elizabeth finally opens up to him after he kills her rapist. Initially, her newfound love for Philip is a conflict of interest to her because she has trouble constructively expressing and making sense of her own emotions. When Philip feels betrayed by her, they become dishonest with one another and briefly separate. It is only when Elizabeth is shot that she realizes how important Philip is in her life, and she realizes she can trust him with everything. She is intelligent, physically fit, attractive, and willing to use these qualities to manipulate people into giving her the information she needs. She is not hesitant to kill and does so often. She puts the Soviet Union and her mission before all other considerations, including her family.

Even though Elizabeth struggles to find a balance between making decisions with her newfound emotion versus the logic that has gotten her so far in her career, Philip is able to help her reach a collaborative decision; as they have become close friends and confidants as the show has progressed. Paige's adolescence is challenging for Elizabeth, particularly due to Paige becoming curious about her parents' activities. Elizabeth is a protective mother, and is around for her kids when they need her most despite being absent from the house most of the day working for the KGB. Elizabeth does not seem to have many hobbies, but she does enjoy bowling.

== Casting ==
Former Felicity star Russell spoke about the decision to work on another television series: "I thought the pilot script was just so interesting. It was so far from a procedural. And [originally,] I didn't know that I wanted to do it. I always say no to everything. I never want to do anything. [Laughs.] But I just couldn't stop thinking about it. I read it...and I kept trying to figure it out, because it's so not clear. It's still not clear to me. But there's so many different levels to it."

== Reception ==
For her portrayal, Russell has been nominated for the Golden Globe Award for Best Actress – Television Series Drama twice, three Primetime Emmy Award for Outstanding Lead Actress in a Drama Series, three Critics' Choice Television Awards for Best Actress in a Drama Series, one Satellite Award for Best Actress in a Television Series – Drama, one Saturn Award for Best Actress on Television, and the Television Critics Association Award for Individual Achievement in Drama.
