= The World Council of Churches (The Americans) =

- The Americans episode
- Episode no.: Season 5 Episode 12
- Directed by: Nicole Kassell
- Written by: Joel Fields; Joe Weisberg
- Cinematography by: Daniel Stoloff
- Editing by: Sheri Bylander
- Production code: BDU512
- Original air date: May 23, 2017
- Running time: 51 minutes

Guest appearances
- Kelly AuCoin as Pastor Tim; Peter Jacobson as Agent Wolfe; Snezhana Chernova as Yelena Burova; Irina Dvorovenko as Evgheniya Morozova; Darya Ekamasova as Sofia Kovalenko; Zack Gafin as Pasha Morozov; Ravil Isyanov as Ruslan; Yuri Kolokolnikov as Gennadi Bystrov; Boris Krutonog as Igor Burov; Ivan Mok as Tuan Eckert; Alex Ozerov as Mischa Semenov; Sacha Slobodyanik as Major Kuznetsov; Aleksey Solodov as Captain Staponov; Oleg Stefan as Anatoly Viktorovich; Margo Martindale as Claudia

Episode chronology
← Previous "Dyatkovo"	Next → "The Soviet Division"
- The Americans season 5

"The World Council of Churches" is the twelfth episode of the fifth season of the American period spy drama television series The Americans. It is the 64th overall episode of the series and was written by executive producer Joel Fields and series creator Joe Weisberg, and directed by Nicole Kassell. It was released on FX on May 23, 2017.

The series is set during the Cold War and follows Elizabeth and Philip Jennings, two Soviet KGB intelligence officers posing as an American married couple living in Falls Church, a Virginia suburb of Washington, D.C., with their American-born children Paige and Henry. It also explores the conflict between Washington's FBI office and the KGB Rezidentura there, from the perspectives of agents on both sides, including the Jennings' neighbor Stan Beeman, an FBI agent working in counterintelligence. In the episode, Philip and Elizabeth decide to move back to Moscow, while Oleg realizes Ekaterina has been arrested.

According to Nielsen Media Research, the episode was seen by an estimated 0.66 million household viewers and gained a 0.2 ratings share among adults aged 18–49. The episode received extremely positive reviews from critics, praising the performances, writing and tension.

== Plot ==
At his church, Pastor Tim (Kelly AuCoin) tells Paige (Holly Taylor) that he will be leaving for Buenos Aires in two months as he has accepted an offer from the World Council of Churches, unaware that Paige asked her parents to ask the KGB to find a way to move Pastor Tim. She reports this to her parents, relieved that her life is now less stressful.

Stan (Noah Emmerich) and Aderholt (Brandon J. Dirden) meet with Sofia (Darya Ekamasova), who has brought her new boyfriend Gennadi (Yuri Kolokolnikov) with her. They are shocked when Gennadi reveals that Sofia has told him everything, but that he still wants to help them. While they believe the mission is in jeopardy, their boss Wolfe (Peter Jacobson) instructs them to continue.

Philip (Matthew Rhys) and Elizabeth (Keri Russell) find that Alexei is unwilling to return home to the USSR, despite Pasha being bullied. They also visit Pastor Tim, revealing that they plan to move back to Moscow but are unsure if Paige and Henry (Keidrich Sellati) will respond positively. Tim explains that it is important that Henry be known about their real identity, but that they will need to evaluate if that is what their children want.

In Moscow, Oleg (Costa Ronin) is questioned over his relationship with Tatiana, and also discovers about William Crandall's death. He later finds that Ekaterina has been arrested and asks Anatoly (Oleg Stefan) in preventing that. Anatoly accepts his terms, and Ekaterina is released. Oleg later has a talk with his father Igor (Boris Krutonog), expressing his disdain for how the ringleaders won't face repercussions for their actions. Somewhere, Mischa (Alex Ozerov) is revealed to be working in a power plant, where he is visited by Philip's brother, Pyotr. Pyotr takes Mischa to meet and dine with his wife and son.

Philip and Elizabeth visit Tuan (Ivan Mok), who states that he has convinced Pasha to try a suicide attempt to finally convince Alexei to leave the country. This is met with horror from Philip and Elizabeth, as they fear Pasha could actually kill himself. Tuan is forced to call Pasha, but no one answers. They are forced to go to Pasha's house, even when there is a surveillance officer outside watching over the house.

== Production ==
=== Development ===
In April 2017, FX confirmed that the twelfth episode of the season would be titled "The World Council of Churches", and that it would be written by executive producer Joel Fields and series creator Joe Weisberg, and directed by Nicole Kassell. This was Fields' 19th writing credit, Weisberg's 20th writing credit, and Kassell's third directing credit.

=== Filming ===
Filming for the episode wrapped by March 6, 2017.

== Reception ==
=== Viewers ===
In its original American broadcast, "The World Council of Churches" was seen by an estimated 0.66 million household viewers with a 0.2 in the 18-49 demographics. This means that 0.2 percent of all households with televisions watched the episode. This was a 6% increase in viewership from the previous episode, which was watched by 0.62 million household viewers with a 0.1 in the 18-49 demographics.

=== Critical reviews ===
"The World Council of Churches" received extremely positive reviews from critics. The review aggregator website Rotten Tomatoes reported a 100% approval rating for the episode, based on 12 reviews. The site's consensus states: "Familial responsibility takes focus in 'The World Council of Churches,' reinforcing The Americans' ability to make its smaller-scale drama just as exciting and impactful as the action."

Erik Adams of The A.V. Club gave the episode a "B+" grade and wrote, "It'll be interesting to look back at season five in the context of The Americans as a whole; in the short run, episodes like 'The World Council Of Churches' are the greatest test of the notion that the family material matters just as much as the spy material."

Alan Sepinwall of Uproxx wrote, "They explain most of the story, but not the crucial detail that would surely make Paige uncomfortable: The real Philip and Elizabeth would have died as babies, to prevent there being a long paper trail attached to that name and Social Security number." Anthony Breznican of Entertainment Weekly wrote, "They got to Pastor Tim. They tempted him into biting the apple, and he didn't even know it."

Mike Hale of The New York Times wrote, "So much of the season has taken place in Moscow, and it seems a fair bet that that trend will continue and grow in the final season, with this week's events promising a larger role for Mischa. I have mixed feelings about that, but if it means more Gabriel and Martha, bring it on." Scott Tobias of Vulture gave the episode a perfect 5 star rating out of 5 and wrote, "in the lead-up to next week's season finale, 'The World Council of Churches' slows down the action a little and considers the limits of what parents can do for their children."

Emily St. James of Vox wrote, "After so many years living in the US, can Philip and Elizabeth simply stop being the titular Americans? Can they really expect to reintegrate into their old lives smoothly? As with all things on this show, I'm guessing it's a bit more complicated than they'd like it to be." Ed Gonzalez of Slant Magazine wrote, "The Americans is the rolling stone that gathers no moss. It's put so many cards on the table throughout its fifth season, many with no clear relationship to one another, that to predict where any of the characters will end up is a fool's errand."

Alec Bojalad of Den of Geek gave the episode a 4.5 star rating out of 5 and wrote, "It's not just the urgent ending that makes 'The World Council of Churches' an ideal second-to-last episode though. Everything else about it is on brand. And for this season of The Americans, that brand means 'The Beginning of the End.'" Matt Brennan of Paste gave the episode an 8.6 out of 10 and wrote, "As The Americans nears the end of its most ambitious arc, a painstaking, jet-black portrait of the families we make and break over the course of life's long passage, 'The World Council of Churches' considers the relationship between what we call ourselves and who we are: What, after all, is in a name?"
