= Darkroom (The Americans) =

- The Americans episode
- Episode no.: Season 5 Episode 10
- Directed by: Sylvain White
- Written by: Stephen Schiff
- Cinematography by: Daniel Stoloff
- Editing by: Daniel Valverde
- Production code: BDU510
- Original air date: May 9, 2017
- Running time: 47 minutes

Guest appearances
- Kelly AuCoin as Pastor Tim; Vera Cherny as Tatiana Evgenyevna Vyazemtseva; Laurie Holden as Renee; Peter Jacobson as Agent Wolfe; Olek Krupa as General Vijktor Zhukov; Snezhana Chernova as Yelena Burova; Irina Dvorovenko as Evgheniya Morozova; Darya Ekamasova as Sofia Kovalenko; Ravil Isyanov as Ruslan; Boris Krutonog as Igor Burov; Konstantin Lavysh as Father Andrei; Ivan Mok as Tuan Eckert; Alexander Sokovikov as Alexei Morozov; Margo Martindale as Claudia

Episode chronology
← Previous "IHOP"	Next → "Dyatkovo"
- The Americans season 5

"Darkroom" is the tenth episode of the fifth season of the American period spy drama television series The Americans. It is the 62nd overall episode of the series and was written by executive producer Stephen Schiff, and directed by Sylvain White. It was released on FX on May 9, 2017.

The series is set during the Cold War and follows Elizabeth and Philip Jennings, two Soviet KGB intelligence officers posing as an American married couple living in Falls Church, a Virginia suburb of Washington, D.C., with their American-born children Paige and Henry. It also explores the conflict between Washington's FBI office and the KGB Rezidentura there, from the perspectives of agents on both sides, including the Jennings' neighbor Stan Beeman, an FBI agent working in counterintelligence. In the episode, Paige finds more information from Tim's diary, while Philip decides to take a new step with Elizabeth.

According to Nielsen Media Research, the episode was seen by an estimated 0.61 million household viewers and gained a 0.2 ratings share among adults aged 18–49. The episode received critical acclaim, with most praising the wedding sequence of Philip and Elizabeth.

== Plot ==
Philip (Matthew Rhys) hangs out with Alexei (Alexander Sokovikov), who laments that Pasha has been bullied in school. He admits that the events made him reconsider his place in the country. Tuan (Ivan Mok) informs Elizabeth (Keri Russell) about his plan to bully Pasha, and she in turn states that she won't report his actions.

Paige (Holly Taylor) tells her parents that she continued seeing Pastor Tim (Kelly AuCoin) and that she kept reading his diary, finding that he made some comments about her that hurt her. Philip and Elizabeth believe this could be used as an advantage and tell Paige that they interfered with preventing starvation in the USSR. They also give Isaac's tape to Claudia (Margo Martindale), who claims she is not aware of the death of the Mujahideen and refuses to believe the Soviets were involved in using the virus.

Stan (Noah Emmerich) and Aderholt (Brandon J. Dirden) visit Sofia (Darya Ekamasova), who tells them about Gennadi, a former Soviet hockey star who carries confidential diplomatic packets to the country. Stan and Aderholt disclose this to Wolfe (Peter Jacobson), and they start working on how to acquire a packet. In Moscow, Oleg (Costa Ronin) and Ruslan (Ravil Isyanov) begin following Lydia, although Oleg feels that his relationship with his parents is dwindling after their previous encounter.

Philip makes a dead drop note for Tatiana (Vera Cherny), who decodes the message. She later approaches Evgheniya (Irina Dvorovenko), telling her she can return to the USSR without worrying about anything. Philip remembers a meeting with General Zhukov (Olek Krupa), who provided him and Elizabeth with a fake marriage licence. Philip takes Elizabeth to their hideout, where Father Andrei (Konstantin Lavysh) is ready to officially pronounce them couple. Father Andrei performs a Russian Orthodox ceremony, with Philip and Elizabeth finally married under their names, Mischa and Nadezhda. Later, Philip, Elizabeth and Paige go to a darkroom to develop photos that Paige took out of Tim's diary. They are surprised upon reading that Tim expressed concern for Paige, feeling that her parents have damaged her and that she is not aware of her suffering.

== Production ==
=== Development ===
In April 2017, FX confirmed that the tenth episode of the season would be titled "Darkroom", and that it would be written by executive producer Stephen Schiff, and directed by Sylvain White. This was Schiff's eighth writing credit, and White's first directing credit.

=== Filming ===
Filming for the episode wrapped by February 10, 2017.

== Reception ==
=== Viewers ===
In its original American broadcast, "Darkroom" was seen by an estimated 0.61 million household viewers with a 0.2 in the 18-49 demographics. This means that 0.2 percent of all households with televisions watched the episode. This was a 11% decrease in viewership from the previous episode, which was watched by 0.68 million household viewers with a 0.2 in the 18-49 demographics.

=== Critical reviews ===
"Darkroom" received critical acclaim. The review aggregator website Rotten Tomatoes reported a 100% approval rating for the episode, based on 12 reviews. The site's consensus states: "'Blackout' ratchets up the tension with a surprising emotional turn that lays the groundwork for the final episodes of The Americans' fifth season."

Erik Adams of The A.V. Club gave the episode an "A" grade and wrote, "'Darkroom' is an emotionally honest episode that's packed with interpersonal and internal dishonesty. You can't write a spy story without characters lying to one another, but on The Americans, the way they lie and what they lie about matters. This week, it all comes back to who these characters are, who they think they are, who other people think they are. There's a lot of conflict to be wrung from the differences between those perceptions."

Alan Sepinwall of Uproxx wrote, "The season as a whole continues to be a slow burn, even by Americans standards, but in moments like that one — and, for that matter, in the contrast between the emotional high of the wedding ceremony and the uncomfortable low of the development process and what it reveals — the show can still hit with devastating force." Anthony Breznican of Entertainment Weekly wrote, "Poor Pastor Tim. He's the one who doesn't know what's coming."

Mike Hale of The New York Times wrote, "It continued to be the Season of Paige this week on The Americans, and with just three episodes left in the season, it really is getting harder to see how any of the adult story lines are going to tie together or be resolved in a satisfactory way." Scott Tobias of Vulture gave the episode a perfect 5 star rating out of 5 and wrote, "Consider the last two scenes before the opening credits of 'Darkroom,' the best and most consequential episode of The Americans since 'Lotus 1-2-3.'"

Emily St. James of Vox wrote, "'Darkroom' is another episode of the show turning up the burners underneath its simmering pot of water and letting us wonder if the damn thing is going to boil already. But as with most of the recent episodes that have done this, I liked it quite a bit." Ed Gonzalez of Slant Magazine wrote, "Last week I bemoaned the absence of Paige from 'IHOP.' But in tonight's episode of The Americans, 'Darkroom,' what happened during that absence is purposefully charted as a governing principle."

Alec Bojalad of Den of Geek gave the episode a 4.5 star rating out of 5 and wrote, "'Darkroom' is a superb episode of television. It's subtle, atmospheric and equally parts tragic and funny. Pasha and his poor shit-stained locker is a good indicator or what the show can do when it's firing on all cylinders. Seriously." Matt Brennan of Paste gave the episode a 9.5 out of 10 and wrote, "'Darkroom' pieces together otherwise disparate fragments through its elaboration of a single theme, though I must admit I was wrong, in my review of 'IHOP,' to predict its form as 'fission.' No, in the exchange of rings as in that blood-red light, or in the match cut of Philip's face as he hears he's a pre-programmed machine, The Americans achieves a far more powerful force: fusion."
