= Dyatkovo (The Americans) =

- The Americans episode
- Episode no.: Season 5 Episode 11
- Directed by: Steph Green
- Written by: Joshua Brand
- Cinematography by: Joseph Bradley Smith
- Editing by: Amanda Pollack
- Production code: BDU511
- Original air date: May 16, 2017
- Running time: 44 minutes

Guest appearances
- Peter Jacobson as Agent Wolfe; Irina Dvorovenko as Evgheniya Morozova; Darya Ekamasova as Sofia Kovalenko; Julia Emelin as Lydia Formina; Ravil Isyanov as Ruslan; Ivan Mok as Tuan Eckert; John Procaccino as John Granholm; Margo Martindale as Claudia

Episode chronology
← Previous "Darkroom"	Next → "The World Council of Churches"
- The Americans season 5

"Dyatkovo" is the eleventh episode of the fifth season of the American period spy drama television series The Americans. It is the 63rd overall episode of the series and was written by consulting producer Joshua Brand, and directed by Steph Green. It was released on FX on May 16, 2017.

The series is set during the Cold War and follows Elizabeth and Philip Jennings, two Soviet KGB intelligence officers posing as an American married couple living in Falls Church, a Virginia suburb of Washington, D.C., with their American-born children Paige and Henry. It also explores the conflict between Washington's FBI office and the KGB Rezidentura there, from the perspectives of agents on both sides, including the Jennings' neighbor Stan Beeman, an FBI agent working in counterintelligence. In the episode, Philip and Elizabeth are assigned in tracking a former Nazi collaborator, while Henry visits Stan's office.

According to Nielsen Media Research, the episode was seen by an estimated 0.62 million household viewers and gained a 0.1 ratings share among adults aged 18–49. The episode received critical acclaim, with Keri Russell receiving praise for her performance. For the episode, Keri Russell received a nomination for Outstanding Lead Actress in a Drama Series at the 69th Primetime Emmy Awards.

== Plot ==
As Philip (Matthew Rhys) prepares to meet with Tuan (Ivan Mok), he tells Henry (Keidrich Sellati) that he will be allowed to go to St. Edward's Academy in New Hampshire if he is accepted.

Philip and Elizabeth (Keri Russell) are assigned by Claudia (Margo Martindale) to go to Newton, Massachusetts. They must investigate Natalie Granholm, a woman suspected of being Anna Prokopchuk, a Nazi collaborator who was involved in mass executions at Dyatkovo during World War II.

When they tell her that Paige (Holly Taylor) wants a new offer for Pastor Tim, Claudia reveals that the Soviets used the Lassa virus in Afghanistan. While they take photographs of Natalie, Philip and Elizabeth are not convinced that she might be Anna.

Henry visits the FBI offices for a school assignment, with Stan (Noah Emmerich) introducing him to Aderholt (Brandon J. Dirden) and Wolfe (Peter Jacobson). While Philip and Elizabeth are worried about Henry's interest in the FBI, Stan tells Henry that his job is quite boring and that it involves keeping so many secrets. Stan later meets with Sofia (Darya Ekamasova), advising her in keeping contact with Gennadi.

In Moscow, Oleg (Costa Ronin) and Ruslan (Ravil Isyanov) follow Lydia (Julia Emelin), and they are surprised upon finding that she is only supplying normal food. They break into her office, discovering a ledger with all the bribes she took from her clients. They later confront her, but she is not scared about the evidence and possible prison time. She claims that she is in a powerful position due to the people's reliance on the system, something that the country will never change.

Despite not having enough evidence, the KGB orders Philip and Elizabeth to kill Natalie. They break into her house and hold her at gunpoint. Natalie claims she is not Anna, prompting Elizabeth to slap her. When Natalie's husband, John (John Procaccino), arrives, they keep him at gunpoint as well. A shaken Natalie finally reveals that she is, in fact, Anna. She explains that she was forced to become an executioner when the Nazis killed her entire family and threatened to also kill her if she refused. John is surprised to learn this, but says he still loves her and believes she is a good person. Philip is moved by the story and cannot bring himself to kill them. Elizabeth notices Philip's hesitation before killing John and Anna. They leave in the car, where Elizabeth says "I want to get out of here. We should just go. I mean it. Let's go home."

Elizabeth's final remark is notable given her longstanding commitment to the Soviet cause. Throughout the series, she is generally portrayed as more ideologically committed than Philip and as more willing to continue their long-term deployment as illegal operatives. The statement has been interpreted as reflecting the couple's breaking point following Philip's deterioration and the strain of their extended deployment as illegal operatives.

== Production ==
=== Development ===
In April 2017, FX confirmed that the eleventh episode of the season would be titled "Dyatkovo", and that it would be written by consulting producer Joshua Brand, and directed by Steph Green. This was Brand' twelfth writing credit, and Green's second directing credit.

=== Filming ===
Filming for the episode wrapped by February 22, 2017.

== Reception ==
=== Viewers ===
In its original American broadcast, "Dyatkovo" was seen by an estimated 0.62 million household viewers with a 0.1 in the 18-49 demographics. This means that 0.1 percent of all households with televisions watched the episode. This was a slight increase in viewership from the previous episode, which was watched by 0.61 million household viewers with a 0.2 in the 18-49 demographics.

=== Critical reviews ===
"Dyatkovo" received critical acclaim. The review aggregator website Rotten Tomatoes reported a 100% approval rating for the episode, based on 12 reviews. The site's consensus states: "'Dyatkovo' puts its protagonists to the test with a grueling final act that poses high-stakes questions for The Americans' series endgame."

Erik Adams of The A.V. Club gave the episode an "A" grade and wrote, "When I watched 'IHOP' and 'Darkroom,' I really, truly believed that they were The Americans at its best. But I was wrong. 'Dyatkovo' is The Americans at its best. This is an episode that applies the slow burn to some of the show's most potent themes — family, trust, the shittiness of being a spy — themes that are underlined in the performance and direction of 'Dyatkovo.'"

Alan Sepinwall of Uproxx wrote, "The show has done some muted finales in the past, and had license to do so because the seasons leading up to them were filled with so much physical and emotional violence. This season's been so understated, though, that if the final two episodes are along the same lines, it will feel like we've spent an entire year on set-up. And, as I've said, I still have absolute faith in Fields and Weisberg to bring this story home in suitably devastating fashion; it's just a shame things had to drag along for a bit to get there." Anthony Breznican of Entertainment Weekly wrote, "The punishment doesn't always fit the crime. Sometimes it merely worsens the crime. This is as close to a stand-alone episode as we're likely to get this season, with Philip and Elizabeth dispatched to investigate whether a late-middle-aged woman from Boston is actually a Nazi collaborator hiding under a new identity."

Mike Hale of The New York Times wrote, "The continuing disillusionment of Philip has been the season's primary arc, but the toll on Elizabeth has been greater, really, and for one episode the show let her waver. With another season to go, the Jenningses aren't headed back to Moscow anytime soon, of course. And the Dyatkovo story, with a couple of expendable characters introduced just for the episode, was a disappointingly convenient, if wrenching, way to move the story toward a point of crisis." Scott Tobias of Vulture gave the episode a perfect 5 star rating out of 5 and wrote, "Two episodes left, and only one season after that. If Elizabeth is serious about going back home, it won't be easy for the Jennings to uproot themselves. And that's assuming the offer is still on the table."

Caroline Framke of Vox wrote, "I'm still frustrated at how slow and seemingly scattered The Americans' plot developments have been lately, a fact I think was exacerbated by the fact that seasons three and four were full of such propulsive energy. But season five has come into much clearer focus with 'Dyatkovo,' a much tauter hour. The episode doesn't exactly reveal why Elizabeth and Philip have been pulled in so many directions of late, but I understood the decision much more by its awful end." Ed Gonzalez of Slant Magazine wrote, "Maybe the show's ultimate project is to recognize its characters' collective disillusionment as that which will bring the Cold War to its dissolution. Is all this worth it? That's a question that runs silently beneath the surface of almost every scene in 'Dyatkovo.'"

Alec Bojalad of Den of Geek gave the episode a 4.5 star rating out of 5 and wrote, "The promise of Elizabeth's pleas at the end of 'Dyatkovo' is that this very well could be the last time they ever do so." Matt Brennan of Paste gave the episode an 8.8 out of 10 and wrote, "The final minutes of 'Dyatkovo' thus condense this season's attention to the past's long reach into one of The Americans' most searing interludes, an examination of the problem of evil that slices into the series' marrow."

=== Accolades ===
At the 69th Primetime Emmy Awards, Keri Russell submitted the episode to support her nomination for Outstanding Lead Actress in a Drama Series. She would lose to Elisabeth Moss for The Handmaid's Tale.
