= Crossbreed (The Americans) =

- The Americans episode
- Episode no.: Season 5 Episode 6
- Directed by: Roxann Dawson
- Written by: Stephen Schiff
- Cinematography by: Daniel Stoloff
- Editing by: Sheri Bylander
- Production code: BDU506
- Original air date: April 11, 2017
- Running time: 44 minutes

Guest appearances
- Darya Ekamasova as Sofia Kovalenko; Snezhana Chernova as Yelena Burova; Irina Dvorovenko as Evgheniya Morozova; Ravil Isyanov as Ruslan; Boris Krutonog as Igor Burov; Leonid A. Mandel as Dmitri Sharonov; Alex Ozerov as Mischa Semenov; John Hans Tester as Dr. Robert Semel; Brett Tucker as Benjamin Stobert; Margo Martindale as Claudia; Frank Langella as Gabriel

Episode chronology
| ← Previous "Lotus 1-2-3" | Next → "The Committee on Human Rights" |
- The Americans season 5

"Crossbreed" is the sixth episode of the fifth season of the American period spy drama television series The Americans. It is the 58th overall episode of the series and was written by executive producer Stephen Schiff, and directed by Roxann Dawson. It was released on FX on April 11, 2017.

The series is set during the Cold War and follows Elizabeth and Philip Jennings, two Soviet KGB intelligence officers posing as an American married couple living in Falls Church, a Virginia suburb of Washington, D.C., with their American-born children Paige and Henry. It also explores the conflict between Washington's FBI office and the KGB Rezidentura there, from the perspectives of agents on both sides, including the Jennings' neighbor Stan Beeman, an FBI agent working in counterintelligence. In the episode, Gabriel announces his retirement, surprising Philip and Elizabeth.

According to Nielsen Media Research, the episode was seen by an estimated 0.71 million household viewers and gained a 0.2 ratings share among adults aged 18–49. The episode received extremely positive reviews from critics, praising the performances and character development. For the episode, Matthew Rhys received a nomination for Outstanding Lead Actor in a Drama Series at the 69th Primetime Emmy Awards.

== Plot ==
Elizabeth (Keri Russell) tells Gabriel (Frank Langella) about her discovery on the pest-resistant strain of wheat. He assigns her to get a sample of the wheat, while Elizabeth claims that Philip (Matthew Rhys) is committed to the mission.

Gabriel tells Claudia (Margo Martindale) that Mischa (Alex Ozerov) has returned to the USSR, although he still feels conflicted on his actions. After visiting the Lincoln Memorial, Gabriel informs Philip and Elizabeth that he is officially retiring and will return to the USSR, as he feels tired. He also warns Philip that Centre may believe he is not suitable for their operations. Elizabeth is visited by a Mary Kay salesman, making her remember about Young Hee. She later visits a psychiatrist in charge of the samples, in order to get access to files.

In Moscow, Oleg (Costa Ronin) and Ruslan (Ravil Isyanov) continue interrogating Dmitri (Leonid A. Mandel). While Dmitri feels guilt over his actions, he still refuses to name his contacts, forcing them to arrest him. Later, when the CIA agents fail to show up, Oleg decides to burn the incriminating tape with his confession.

Before Gabriel leaves, Philip asks him about his father, as he is recently haunted by flashbacks to his childhood. Gabriel reveals that Philip's perception of his father as a logger is actually untrue; his father was a guard at a Siberian lumber/labor camp and he is not sure how he behaved during his job. Philip expresses his concerns with Elizabeth, as he failed to see the real nature of his father. They decide that they need Paige (Holly Taylor) to meet Gabriel before he leaves. They take her to his apartment, where they exchange looks for the first time.

== Production ==
=== Development ===
In March 2017, FX confirmed that the sixth episode of the season would be titled "Crossbreed", and that it would be written by executive producer Stephen Schiff, and directed by Roxann Dawson. This was Schiff's seventh writing credit, and Dawson's first directing credit.

=== Filming ===
Filming for the episode wrapped by January 4, 2017.

== Reception ==
=== Viewers ===
In its original American broadcast, "Crossbreed" was seen by an estimated 0.71 million household viewers with a 0.2 in the 18-49 demographics. This means that 0.2 percent of all households with televisions watched the episode. This was a slight increase in viewership from the previous episode, which was watched by 0.70 million household viewers with a 0.2 in the 18-49 demographics.

=== Critical reviews ===
"Crossbreed" received extremely positive reviews. The review aggregator website Rotten Tomatoes reported an 100% approval rating, based on 13 reviews. The site's consensus states: "'Crossbreed' quietly heightens the stakes in The Americans' fifth season while opening the door to a beloved character's departure - and an unexpected meeting."

Erik Adams of The A.V. Club gave the episode an "A–" grade and wrote, "The quiet, confident work that Frank Langella has done on The Americans could go unnoticed. Consistency often is. But there’s nothing like the line 'I'm just tired. And old,' to make you realize you've been taking the Tony winner for granted. Without ever raising his voice above that reassuring purr, Langella stirs so many feelings in 'Crossbreed.' There's heartbreak at his reluctance to leave Elizabeth and Philip."

Alan Sepinwall of Uproxx wrote, "A very heavy episode overall, but several dryly amusing moments, from Philip assuming all psychiatrists ask about dreams to the look on Elizabeth's face when she realizes Paige is making the same argument Philip has about how long it’s been since they saw what the Soviet Union was like in person." Anthony Breznican of Entertainment Weekly wrote, "As the show ends, Paige reaches out and shakes the hand of a kindly old man. Just as Gabriel is ready to say goodbye, he gets one last hello."

Mike Hale of The New York Times wrote, "'Crossbreed' extended the season's atypically peaceful vibe — tension, without real danger. But the emotional stakes were high. Written by Stephen Schiff and directed by Roxann Dawson, the episode was ambitious, weaving religion, psychoanalysis, Marxism and martial arts into a late-20th-century thematic tapestry. And it played nimble, complex variations on the idea of fathers and sons (and daughters) and the secrets they keep." Scott Tobias of Vulture scored the episode four out of five and wrote, "'Crossbreed' gives Gabriel — and Langella's performance — some long overdue acknowledgement. As Gabriel abruptly announces his retirement, it's a clarifying moment for his character and for Langella's value to the show."

Caroline Framke of Vox wrote, "It's a pretty sedate hour, all things considered, but it's intimate and revealing in a way I've been waiting for all season. From Elizabeth trying to find Young Hee to Gabriel telling Philip the truth about his father, everyone's attempts to reconcile with their past failed big time." Ed Gonzalez of Slant Magazine wrote, "The Americans isn't a very political series, or rather, it isn't an explicitly political one. Certainly, 'Crossbreed' feels the closest that the series has come to offering up a commentary on the fundamental idea of communism, and yet, given the rather pointed reference that Paige makes to her communion in the process of telling her mother that she's getting something valuable out of the Marx that she's reading, it's also more accurate to say that the series is generally about people’s struggle to abide by the tenets of any belief system that's been essentially forced on them."

Alec Bojalad of Den of Geek gave the episode three and a half out of five, writing that it was the "worst of the season so far", but adding "this remains an excellent episode of TV and and[sic] episode show. Each passing episode of season 5 feels like it's building to something radical and special. It's widening gyre time and no amount of psychiatrist side quests or Mischa setbacks can distract from this moral center and its inability to hold." Matt Brennan of Paste gave the episode a 7.6 out of 10 and wrote, "For all its flaws, 'Crossbreed' depicts characters on the precipice of change they can neither predict nor prevent, and in this context, Gabriel's reflection gathers to it the power of a premonition."

=== Accolades ===
At the 69th Primetime Emmy Awards, Matthew Rhys submitted the episode to support his nomination for Outstanding Lead Actor in a Drama Series. He would lose to Sterling K. Brown for This Is Us.
