= Amber Waves (The Americans) =

- The Americans episode
- Episode no.: Season 5 Episode 1
- Directed by: Chris Long
- Written by: Joel Fields; Joe Weisberg
- Cinematography by: Daniel Stoloff
- Editing by: Daniel Valverde
- Production code: BDU501
- Original air date: March 7, 2017
- Running time: 48 minutes

Guest appearances
- Daniel Flaherty as Matthew Beeman; Peter Jacobson as Agent Wolfe; Peter Mark Kendall as Hans; Snezhana Chernova as Yelena Burova; Irina Dvorovenko as Evgheniya Morozova; Zack Gafin as Pasha Morozov; Boris Krutonog as Igor Burov; Ivan Mok as Tuan Eckert; Alex Ozerov as Mischa Semenov; Alexander Sokovikov as Alexei Morozov; Oleg Stefan as Anatoly Viktorovich; Margo Martindale as Claudia; Frank Langella as Gabriel

Episode chronology
← Previous "Persona Non Grata"	Next → "Pests"
- The Americans season 5

"Amber Waves" is the first episode of the fifth season of the American period spy drama television series The Americans. It is the 53rd overall episode of the series and was written by executive producer Joel Fields and series creator Joe Weisberg, and directed by executive producer Chris Long. It was released on FX on March 7, 2017.

The series is set during the Cold War and follows Elizabeth and Philip Jennings, two Soviet KGB intelligence officers posing as an American married couple living in Falls Church, a Virginia suburb of Washington, D.C., with their American-born children Paige and Henry. It also explores the conflict between Washington's FBI office and the KGB Rezidentura there, from the perspectives of agents on both sides, including the Jennings' neighbor Stan Beeman, an FBI agent working in counterintelligence. In the episode, Philip and Elizabeth are assigned a new target, while Oleg settles into his new life in Moscow.

According to Nielsen Media Research, the episode was seen by an estimated 0.93 million household viewers and gained a 0.2 ratings share among adults aged 18–49. The episode received critical acclaim, with critics praising the performances, writing and ending.

== Plot ==
At a high school in Maryland, a boy named Tuan (Ivan Mok) befriends a classmate, Pasha (Zack Gafin), a Russian-born student who struggles in making friends. Tuan takes Pasha to his house, introducing him to his parents, Dee and Brad Eckert. The Eckerts are revealed to be Elizabeth (Keri Russell) and Philip (Matthew Rhys), disguised as part of a new assignment.

In Moscow, Oleg (Costa Ronin) has moved in with his parents, with Yelena (Snezhana Chernova) still grieving her loss. He then meets with Colonel Anatoly Viktorovich (Oleg Stefan), tasking him with investigating corruption in many food chains. Some of the people are involved are related to Igor (Boris Krutonog), so Oleg is warned to follow instructions and not let his father influence his decisions. Meanwhile, Mischa (Alex Ozerov) leaves the USSR, arriving at Yugoslavia. Claudia (Margo Martindale) and Gabriel (Frank Langella) are informed of Misha's plans to arrive in the United States, and they fear that he might try to find Philip.

Philip, Elizabeth and Tuan dine with Pasha and his parents, Alexei (Alexander Sokovikov) and Evgheniya Morozova (Irina Dvorovenko). Tuan is revealed to be a Vietnamese agent cooperating with Philip and Elizabeth in investigating Alexei, a defected Soviet agriculture expert who now works at the United States Department of Agriculture to disclose his knowledge. At home, Philip and Elizabeth still disapprove of Paige (Holly Taylor) dating Matthew (Daniel Flaherty), as they feel it could impact their identities. Seeing that Paige is still paranoid over the mugger incident, Elizabeth decides to train her in self-defense.

Gabriel informs Philip and Elizabeth of William's death, and tasks them to retrieve a sample of weaponized Lassa virus from William's infected body, which is buried in Fort Detrick. Philip and Elizabeth are accompanied by Hans (Peter Mark Kendall) and three other KGB operatives. They exhume William's body from a metal casket and remove a piece of flesh from his body. However, Hans accidentally falls into the hole and slices his hand open, exposing him to the virus. As Elizabeth comforts Hans, she kills him with a gunshot. They bury Hans in the metal casket with William's body.

== Production ==
=== Development ===
In February 2017, FX confirmed that the first episode of the season would be titled "Amber Waves", and that it would be written by executive producer Joel Fields and series creator Joe Weisberg, and directed by executive producer Chris Long. This was Fields' 17th writing credit, Weisberg's 18th writing credit, and Long's fourth directing credit.

=== Filming ===
Filming for the episode started on October 11, 2016.

== Reception ==
=== Viewers ===
In its original American broadcast, "Amber Waves" was seen by an estimated 0.93 million household viewers with a 0.2 in the 18-49 demographics. This means that 0.2 percent of all households with televisions watched the episode. This was a 20% increase in viewership from the previous episode, which was watched by 0.77 million household viewers with a 0.2 in the 18-49 demographics.

=== Critical reviews ===
"Amber Waves" received critical acclaim. The review aggregator website Rotten Tomatoes reported an 100% approval rating for the episode, based on 17 reviews. The site's consensus states: "'Amber Waves' kicks off a new season of The Americans with compelling questions of loyalty, impressive contrasts of character, and a sense of desperation building to a dangerous boil."

Eric Goldman of IGN gave the episode a "great" 8.5 out of 10 and wrote in his verdict, "A busy Americans season premiere quickly reminded viewers how engaging this series is, with the Jennings now living a second suburban life, (fake) kid included, and having to do some incredibly ghastly things in the name of their country. The time jump made things exciting to be sure, though it did skip over some moments it would have been nice to have seen play out. Still, with the knowledge that this season and next are telling the end of the story, the stage is set for even more exciting and emotional twists and turns."

Erik Adams of The A.V. Club gave the episode an "A" grade and wrote, "'Amber Waves' is a promising start to The Americans' penultimate season, and I'm not just saying that because the very first soundtrack cue of season five is Devo's 'fascist clown' anthem "That's Good." After four years of slow-burning suspense, the show still knows how to pull a fascinating fast one on us — even using some of those slow-burn techniques to accomplish it."

Alan Sepinwall of Uproxx wrote, "In time, of course, we'll see that this is just another temporary cover, and that they're still mainly living in the house in Falls Church with Paige and a now power forward-sized Henry. But opening the season like this is a clever way for Fields and Weisberg to deke to the left of that blatantly fake cliffhanger they set up last year." Anthony Breznican of Entertainment Weekly wrote, "This FX series has always been a heavy one, but now it's carrying an extra burden: the ongoing revelations about how Russian operatives may have compromised a U.S. candidate for president. But we're skipping ahead to maybe season 35 of The Americans."

Mike Hale of The New York Times wrote, "The stars were mostly supporting players for a week. The groundwork was laid for the Morozov mission, but virtually nothing was revealed about its details." Scott Tobias of Vulture gave the episode a 4 star rating out of 5 and wrote, "No other show cares so little about hand-holding new viewers until they've caught up — or even about long-time viewers who may have forgotten a few details in the interim between seasons. That's by no means a criticism, but even as The Americans has finally gotten the Emmys attention it was long denied, it hasn't altered its trajectory a hair."

Ben Travers of IndieWire gave the episode an "A" grade and wrote, "the Season 5 premiere of The Americans delivered everything we've come to love about the show: smart surprises, honest conversation, and quite a few lingering questions." Ed Gonzalez of Slant Magazine wrote, "Most shows' season-premiere episodes are flagrant acts of inelegant bookkeeping — a means of, say, tying up the previous season's loose ends and introducing new characters and plotlines. But The Americans isn't like most shows, unafraid of throwing wrenches in seemingly well-laid plans and, here, folding the theme of food into the narrative in peculiar, ruminative ways — which is to say, without making it sound like a talking point."

Alec Bojalad of Den of Geek gave the episode a 4 star rating out of 5 and wrote, "If 'Amber Waves' has a flaw its that a bold beginning and superb ending detract from the plot moving that comes in-between. Still, its continued dedication to characterd and the introduction of a perfect season-long theme suggests that we're in for another great season of The Americans. Ho-hum. Planets turn. Dogs bark. The sky is blue. Russians steal elections. The Americans churns out good TV." Matt Brennan of Paste gave the episode an 8.5 out of 10 and wrote, "Consider whether the recitation of patriotic propaganda is merely a cover for a country's crimes. And then ask yourself, as The Americans asks: Is this what I want to be fighting for?"
