= The Americans season 5 =

The Americans
- Season 5
- DVD cover
- No. of episodes: 13

Release
- Original network: FX
- Original release: March 7 – May 30, 2017

Season chronology
- ← Previous; Season 4 Next → Season 6

The fifth season of the American television drama series The Americans, comprising 13 episodes, aired on FX from March 7 to May 30, 2017. The show moved to Tuesdays, having aired on Wednesdays for its first four seasons.

The events of the fifth season take place between February 1984 and August 1984, shown by the reference to the TV broadcasts of the 1984 Winter Olympics in episode 1 and the coverage of Ronald Reagan's "We begin bombing in five minutes" joke in episode 13.

== Cast ==
=== Main ===
- Keri Russell as Elizabeth Jennings (Nadezhda), a KGB officer
- Matthew Rhys as Philip Jennings (Mischa), a KGB officer
- Brandon J. Dirden as FBI agent Dennis Aderholt
- Costa Ronin as Oleg Igorevich Burov, a KGB officer
- Keidrich Sellati as Henry Jennings, Elizabeth and Philip's son
- Holly Taylor as Paige Jennings, Elizabeth and Philip's daughter
- Noah Emmerich as FBI agent Stan Beeman

=== Special guests ===
- Alison Wright as Martha Hanson

=== Recurring ===
- Frank Langella as Gabriel, the Jennings' KGB handler
- Margo Martindale as Claudia, the Jennings' replacement KGB handler
- Laurie Holden as Renee
- Danny Flaherty as Matthew Beeman, Stan's son
- Kelly AuCoin as Pastor Tim, the minister at Paige's church
- Peter Jacobson as Agent Wolfe, new head of FBI counterintelligence
- Ivan Mok as Tuan Eckert, a Vietnamese agent acting as the adopted son of the Jennings' newest cover identities
- Alex Ozerov as Mischa Semenov, Philip and Irina's son
- Alexander Sokovikov as Alexei Morozov, a scientist and Soviet defector
- Irina Dvorovenko as Evgheniya Morozova, Alexei's wife
- Brett Tucker as Benjamin Stobert, an employee of Agri-Corp, Elizabeth's mark in Topeka
- Clea Lewis as Deirdre Kemp, vice-president of production and distribution at Agri-Corp, Philip's mark in Topeka
- Zack Gafin as Pasha Morozov, Alexei and Evgheniya's son
- Darya Ekamasova as Sofia Kovalenko, a TASS employee
- Julia Garner as Kimberly "Kimmy" Breland, daughter of the head of the CIA's Afghan desk
- Boris Krutonog as Igor Burov, Oleg's father, head of the Soviet Ministry of Railways
- Snezhana Chernova as Yelena Burova, Oleg's mother
- Ravil Isyanov as Ruslan, an OBKhSS investigator
- Konstantin Lavysh as Father Andrei, a Russian Orthodox priest

== Production ==
In May 2016, FX renewed the series for a 13-episode fifth season to air in 2017; and a sixth and final 10-episode season to air in 2018. The season began principal photography on October 11, 2016; filming was completed on March 13, 2017.

== Episodes ==
| No. overall | No. in season | Title | Directed by | Written by | Original release date | Prod. code | US viewers (millions) |
|---|---|---|---|---|---|---|---|
| 53 | 1 | "Amber Waves" | Chris Long | Joel Fields & Joe Weisberg | March 7, 2017 | BDU501 | 0.93 |
Philip and Elizabeth have a new assignment investigating a Soviet defector, an agricultural expert named Morozov, and his family. They have false identities as an airline pilot and a flight attendant and work with a young agent posing as their adopted son Tuan. They continue to disapprove of Paige's growing relationship with Matthew. Paige is still fearful and Elizabeth teaches her more self-defense. Oleg has returned to Moscow and works investigating food chain corruption, a job which may be dangerous for him and his family. Mischa leaves the USSR without permission, alarming Claudia and Gabriel, who think he might be headed to Philip. The KGB dispatches a six-person team, including the Jenningses and Hans, to retrieve a sample of weaponized Lassa fever from William's infected body, which is buried in Fort Detrick. The group cuts through a fence at the fort and dig up William's body. Hans stumbles in the grave and cuts his hand. Knowing that he is infected, Elizabeth kills him.
| 54 | 2 | "Pests" | Chris Long | Joel Fields & Joe Weisberg | March 14, 2017 | BDU502 | 0.94 |
Gabriel sends Elizabeth to Illinois to follow Morozov and discover whether he is working on a biological weapon to be used in wheat crops being traded to the USSR. In a research greenhouse, she discovers wheat-eating midges. Elizabeth is tired of treating Paige like a child and teaches her a calming technique that she and Philip use. Stan starts dating Renee, a woman he met at the gym, and hears worrisome details about the CIA's plans to blackmail Oleg. He tries to prevent this but is told that the plan will move forward. Philip wonders whether they should kill Morozov, but Elizabeth says that they need him.
| 55 | 3 | "The Midges" | Stefan Schwartz | Tracey Scott Wilson | March 21, 2017 | BDU503 | 0.80 |
Paige uses her newly learned calming technique when Matthew presses her about her emotional state. Dennis and Stan approach two potential sources with no immediate results. Mischa's trip takes an unexpected turn in Ljubljana when his intended contact is not available. Oleg enforces anti-corruption rules in a Soviet supermarket where Martha is seen shopping. After Oleg refuses to meet with a contact who claims to be sent by Stan, he is given a recording that would incriminate him. Philip and Elizabeth decide to divulge bits of information concerning the agriculture mission to Paige, hoping that she will become more sympathetic to their work. The Jenningses go to Oklahoma City, where the midges are being bred and studied. They are forced to murder an unwitting biologist after having extracted key intelligence from him.
| 56 | 4 | "What's the Matter with Kansas?" | Gwyneth Horder-Payton | Peter Ackerman | March 28, 2017 | BDU504 | 0.89 |
As a consequence of the Oklahoma City information, Philip and Elizabeth receive new "honey trapping" assignments in Topeka, Kansas, which they grudgingly undertake. Over drinks, Morozov opens up to Philip about the problems with Soviet agriculture. Oleg shares his threatening circumstances with his mother, who tells him that she spent five years in an internment camp. Stan promises to publicly implicate himself in Vlad's killing if the CIA goes after Oleg. After surreptitiously crossing the Yugoslav border into Austria, Mischa arrives at John F. Kennedy Airport. Paige finds Pastor Tim's diary while babysitting at his house. Elizabeth tells her that it was brave but dangerous and later suggests to Philip that the diary might be useful.
| 57 | 5 | "Lotus 1-2-3" | Noah Emmerich | Joshua Brand | April 4, 2017 | BDU505 | 0.70 |
Philip and Elizabeth advance their honey trap missions with Deirdre and Ben in Topeka. In Russia, Oleg continues to investigate food supply chain corruption. The CIA drops its pursuit of Oleg. Evgheniya informs Elizabeth that she has interviewed to become a Russian language instructor inside the US government. After Gabriel and Claudia discuss the risks of a meeting between Mischa and Philip, Gabriel informs Mischa that the reunion with his father will have to wait. Stan enjoys Renee's company, while Philip suspects that she may be a KGB agent. The Jenningses are happily surprised to learn that Henry is excelling in math at school, but Henry resents their amazement. Paige tells Philip that she has doubts about her relationship with Matthew, and wonders if she will ever have a relationship. Elizabeth learns that the Center has made a crucial error when Ben explains that the US government's program is trying to develop a pest-resistant strain of wheat. When she tells Philip, he is overwhelmed with guilt over having needlessly killed the lab employee, and vows to never let it happen again.
| 58 | 6 | "Crossbreed" | Roxann Dawson | Stephen Schiff | April 11, 2017 | BDU506 | 0.71 |
Elizabeth's assignment changes to getting a sample of pest-resistant wheat. Gabriel discusses Mischa's return to the Soviet Union with Claudia. he informs the Jenningses that he is returning to Russia and explains that the Center will always question Philip's loyalties. Dmitri, Oleg's target in the food chain investigation, confesses his own guilt but refuses to name his contacts despite being imprisoned. At a park, Dennis and Stan approach a Soviet woman, Sofia, who may be willing to become a source for the FBI. A random visit from a Mary Kay saleswoman triggers memories of Young Hee for Elizabeth. Oleg burns the recording of himself with Stan that the CIA gave him. As Philip's flashbacks to his youth continue, he learns from Gabriel that his father was a guard at a Siberian lumber/labor camp. Philip and Elizabeth bring Paige to meet Gabriel before he retires.
| 59 | 7 | "The Committee on Human Rights" | Matthew Rhys | Hilary Bettis | April 18, 2017 | BDU507 | 0.79 |
Paige meets Gabriel and learns that he has been a hidden member of the Jennings family throughout her lifetime. She tells Pastor Tim that she has found a purpose and decides to end her relationship with Matthew. Philip and Elizabeth follow Ben to Mississippi and obtain a sample of the pest-resistant wheat, which they give to Gabriel to take to the USSR. They also see Ben meeting with another girlfriend. Elizabeth steals a file containing the names and addresses of Soviet dissidents from a psychiatrist. Dennis and Stan meet with Sofia, who works for TASS, again. Agent Wolfe tells Stan about the CIA's decision on Oleg and Stan tells a highly edited version of the story to Renee. Oleg views the KGB files of his mother's captivity at a labor camp. During their goodbyes, Philip asks Gabriel if Renee is an agent ("one of us"), but Gabriel scoffs at the idea. Gabriel tells Philip that he was right to want to keep Paige out of spying.
| 60 | 8 | "Immersion" | Kevin Bray | Tracey Scott Wilson | April 25, 2017 | BDU508 | 0.76 |
Oleg's bedroom is unexpectedly searched by the PGU. Evgheniya tells Elizabeth of an upcoming student "immersion" event, but when the Jenningses follow her they find that she is having an extramarital affair. Elizabeth decides not to make a scheduled visit to Kansas. Philip calls Deirdre to also cancel but she breaks up with him. Stan and Dennis meet with Sofia and go over details and terms of a possible arrangement. Claudia fills in for Gabriel and Elizabeth makes an effort to get along with her. Elizabeth divulges to Paige that she was raped. Henry has friends over to the house, including Chris, a girl he is romantically interested in, while Elizabeth and Philip converse with Stan. The Jenningses and Tuan decide on a cruel course of action concerning Pasha at school to encourage Evgheniya's return to Moscow. Having talked with Elizabeth, Philip regains Deirdre's interest by telling her he is married.
| 61 | 9 | "IHOP" | Dan Attias | Peter Ackerman | May 2, 2017 | BDU509 | 0.68 |
Henry informs his parents he wants to attend a prestigious New England boarding school in the fall. Philip checks in on Kimmy and retrieves a recording from her father's office indicating that the Soviet government may be using Lassa fever in Afghanistan against US-backed insurgents. Philip meets with one of Gabriel's other agents, a Russian priest named Father Andrei. In Moscow, Gabriel pays a visit to an unwelcoming Martha. Agent Wolfe relays to Stan conclusive evidence that the KGB was behind Gaad's murder and opines that the US should blackmail Oleg. Stan meets with Gaad's widow, who thinks that Gaad would want revenge. Oleg is questioned about his relationship with Stan and Nina by the PGU. When he returns home, he and his father discuss his mother's days in a labor camp. Oleg pressures prisoner Dimitri into revealing one of his suppliers. Elizabeth decides she should spend the evening with Tuan, but he never comes home. Elizabeth, Philip, and a team of other agents tail Tuan and track his movements to Harrisburg, Pennsylvania, where he ducks into an IHOP. Questioned at gunpoint, Tuan explains he was checking on a sick foster brother begging the Jenningses not to report the incident.
| 62 | 10 | "Darkroom" | Sylvain White | Stephen Schiff | May 9, 2017 | BDU510 | 0.61 |
After Tuan's plan to make Pasha miserable at school takes effect, Morozov discusses his homesickness with Philip, and Evgheniya discusses her unhappiness with Elizabeth. After receiving a coded note from Philip, Tatiana approaches Evgheniya and tells her that there will be no repercussions against her family if they return to the USSR. Paige reads Pastor Tim's diary again and finds upsetting comments about her. Claudia tells the Jenningses that she is unaware of any Soviet use of lassa fever and that their honey-trap missions in Topeka will have to continue while Soviet scientists work on the hybrid wheat. The Jenningses ask the Center about arranging a job offer for Pastor Tim that would relocate him. Sofia tells Stan and Dennis that she has a relationship with Gennadi, a former Soviet hockey star who carries confidential diplomatic packets to the US. Philip and Elizabeth get married in a Russian Orthodox ceremony secretly performed by Father Andrei, using their Russian names Mischa and Nadezhda. Paige photographs Pastor Tim's diary and Philip and Elizabeth are shocked to read his characterization of their actions as "monstrous" and permanently damaging to Paige.
| 63 | 11 | "Dyatkovo" | Steph Green | Joshua Brand | May 16, 2017 | BDU511 | 0.62 |
Philip tells Henry that if he is admitted to the boarding school he can go. Claudia gives the Jenningses a new assignment to target a woman in suburban Boston who might be Anna, a Nazi collaborator in Dyatkovo during WWII. They tell her that Paige can accept the possibility of luring Pastor Tim away. Claudia confirms that the Soviets weaponized William's lassa fever. Henry tours FBI counterintelligence with Stan for a school assignment. Oleg and his partner investigate Lydia and find a ledger detailing her activities but she is not intimidated by them despite the threat of imprisonment. At gunpoint, Anna admits her WWII activities to the Jenningses and her American husband, although she describes the duress she was under at age 16 after the Nazis killed her parents. Philip hesitates but Elizabeth kills Anna and her husband. In their car, Elizabeth says to Philip, "Let's go home."
| 64 | 12 | "The World Council of Churches" | Nicole Kassell | Joel Fields & Joe Weisberg | May 23, 2017 | BDU512 | 0.66 |
Pastor Tim tells Paige he has accepted a position in Buenos Aires. Oleg is questioned by the PGU about his relationship with Stan and Tatiana, and William's capture by the FBI. In the food investigation Oleg requests that no action be taken by the KGB against his informants, but learns that no action will be taken against the ringleaders. The Jenningses tell Claudia they are thinking of returning to the Soviet Union with their children. Evgheniya tells Elizabeth that her husband will not return to Moscow despite Pasha's troubles. Elizabeth tells Tuan that they need a new approach. Sofia springs her boyfriend Gennadi on Stan and Dennis. They fear Sofia's cover has been blown. The Jenningses ask Pastor Tim whether he thinks Paige and Henry could live in the USSR. Henry and Chris prepare dinner for his family as thanks for letting him go to boarding school, but Paige senses that something is wrong. Tuan tells the Jenningses that he has persuaded Pasha to slit his wrists to get his parents to move. When the Morozovs' phone is unanswered, Philip leads Elizabeth and Tuan to the Morozov house, despite the presence of a surveillance car.
| 65 | 13 | "The Soviet Division" | Chris Long | Joel Fields & Joe Weisberg | May 30, 2017 | BDU513 | 0.77 |
The Jenningses and Tuan discover Pasha wounded but alive. As a result, Evgheniya agrees to take him back to Moscow without her husband. Tuan criticizes the Jenningses for their "petty bourgeois" concerns, and Elizabeth tells Tuan that he will fail without a partner. Gennadi passes an FBI polygraph test. Renee moves in with Stan because of flooding in her apartment and talks him out of leaving counterintelligence. In Moscow, Martha's language instructor, after consulting with Gabriel, tells her that she will be allowed to adopt a young orphan named Olya. Philip and Elizabeth make their final decision to return home to the USSR with their children, who have not been told. Henry and Chris are admitted to the boarding school, but Philip tells Henry, without explanation, that he cannot go. Paige continues training with Elizabeth. Philip tells Kimmy that he may take a job overseas but he later learns that Kimmy's father Isaac is being promoted to head of the CIA's Soviet division. Philip and Elizabeth agree that they will have to stay in the US to continue the Kimmy operation and Elizabeth volunteers to handle new assignments by herself.

== Reception ==
=== Critical response ===
The fifth season has received widespread critical acclaim. On Rotten Tomatoes, it received a 95% approval rating with an average score of 9.09 out of 10 based on 37 reviews, with a critics consensus of: "In its penultimate season, The Americans brings long-simmering storylines to a boil while heightening the spy-thriller stakes and deepening the domestic drama—all brought vividly to life by superb performances from its veteran cast." On Metacritic, the season has a score of 94 out of 100 based on 19 reviews, indicating "universal acclaim". Matthew Gilbert of The Boston Globe gave it a highly positive review and wrote, "The drama remains as tense as ever, with strong, careful writing and an abundance of fine performances". Tim Goodman of The Hollywood Reporter also lauded the series, "It's extremely well-constructed, with slow-burning storylines that are paying off in superb dramatic depth" and praised its "top-tier acting" and "artfully crafted visuals".

In regards to the premiere, some criticisms came from Emily VanDerWerff of Vox who noted that the symbolism of "spending a long time digging a hole so deep that you probably can't escape it—while knowing you'll lose friends along the way—is a little on-the-nose", while Mike Hale of The New York Times was not very excited with the first episode's "grainy montage set to martial music that began with images of collectivist agricultural might before segueing to blighted fields and long lines outside stores." Libby Nelson of Vox thought that "the agriculture plot was the weakest link" in the second episode.

The fifth season was criticized for becoming too slow, turning the show from "slow burn" into just "warm embers". According to Fields and Weisberg, they wanted the fifth season "to feel different as it unspooled", harvesting the story pieces created in the fourth season. The fifth season was not meant as a set-up for the sixth season. With pacing of the fifth season slowed down intentionally, Weisberg and Fields admitted that they did not expect "this much of a backlash" for "hitting the brakes too hard". They were upset by criticism, but suggested waiting until the series is over, hoping for the response to become more muted in context of the sixth and final season.

=== Accolades ===
For the 33rd TCA Awards, The Americans received a nomination for Outstanding Achievement in Drama. For the 69th Primetime Emmy Awards, the series received four nominations–Matthew Rhys for Outstanding Lead Actor in a Drama Series, Keri Russell for Outstanding Lead Actress in a Drama Series, Alison Wright for Outstanding Guest Actress in a Drama Series, and Joel Fields and Joe Weisberg for Outstanding Writing for a Drama Series for "The Soviet Division".
