= Pests (The Americans) =

- The Americans episode
- Episode no.: Season 5 Episode 2
- Directed by: Chris Long
- Written by: Joel Fields; Joe Weisberg
- Cinematography by: Daniel Stoloff
- Editing by: Amanda Pollack
- Production code: BDU502
- Original air date: March 14, 2017
- Running time: 46 minutes

Guest appearances
- Daniel Flaherty as Matthew Beeman; Laurie Holden as Renee; Peter Jacobson as Agent Wolfe; Cotter Smith as Deputy Attorney General; Snezhana Chernova as Yelena Burova; Irina Dvorovenko as Evgheniya Morozova; Zack Gafin as Pasha Morozov; Ivan Mok as Tuan Eckert; Alexander Sokovikov as Alexei Morozov; Oleg Stefan as Anatoly Viktorovich; Frank Langella as Gabriel

Episode chronology
← Previous "Amber Waves"	Next → "The Midges"
- The Americans season 5

"Pests" is the second episode of the fifth season of the American period spy drama television series The Americans. It is the 54th overall episode of the series and was written by executive producer Joel Fields and series creator Joe Weisberg, and directed by executive producer Chris Long. It was released on FX on March 14, 2017.

The series is set during the Cold War and follows Elizabeth and Philip Jennings, two Soviet KGB intelligence officers posing as an American married couple living in Falls Church, a Virginia suburb of Washington, D.C., with their American-born children Paige and Henry. It also explores the conflict between Washington's FBI office and the KGB Rezidentura there, from the perspectives of agents on both sides, including the Jennings' neighbor Stan Beeman, an FBI agent working in counterintelligence. In the episode, Elizabeth investigates a farm where Alexei works, while Stan finds that the FBI plans a new strategy with Oleg.

According to Nielsen Media Research, the episode was seen by an estimated 0.94 million household viewers and gained a 0.2 ratings share among adults aged 18–49. The episode received extremely positive reviews from critics, praising the performances and character development.

== Plot ==
Philip (Matthew Rhys) and Elizabeth (Keri Russell) deliver William's sample to Gabriel (Frank Langella). Gabriel assigns them to follow Alexei (Alexander Sokovikov) to Illinois, stating that there is the suspicion that the United States is affecting the food supply in Russia.

In Moscow, Oleg (Costa Ronin) starts investigating many food chains. Agent Wolfe (Peter Jacobson) informs Stan (Noah Emmerich) that the FBI plans to blackmail Oleg into defection, using Stan's recorded conversation when Oleg gave away William's plan. Scared of the repercussions, Stan meets with the Deputy Attorney General (Cotter Smith) to prevent the plan from going forward, but he is told that he is unable to do anything about it. Oleg is approached by a CIA agent stationed in Moscow.

Elizabeth watches Alexei entering a farm with some of his associates. After they leave, she enters a greenhouse, discovering plants in a decaying state. She then discovers that the farm houses midges that eat wheat, contaminating it and reducing its value. Philip considers killing Alexei to prevent the starvation crisis, but Elizabeth convinces him in waiting. Philip also meets Stan's girlfriend, Renee (Laurie Holden), although he is taken aback when Stan claims she reminded him of Philip. After dining with Alexei and his family, Philip and Elizabeth decide to teach Paige (Holly Taylor) a new technique in order to hide her fears and paranoia.

== Production ==
=== Development ===
In February 2017, FX confirmed that the second episode of the season would be titled "Pests", and that it would be written by executive producer Joel Fields and series creator Joe Weisberg, and directed by executive producer Chris Long. This was Fields' 18th writing credit, Weisberg's 19th writing credit, and Long's fifth directing credit.

=== Filming ===
Filming for the episode started on October 24, 2016, and wrapped by November 4, 2016.

== Reception ==
=== Viewers ===
In its original American broadcast, "Pests" was seen by an estimated 0.94 million household viewers with a 0.2 in the 18-49 demographics. This means that 0.2 percent of all households with televisions watched the episode. This was a slight increase in viewership from the previous episode, which was watched by 0.93 million household viewers with a 0.2 in the 18-49 demographics.

=== Critical reviews ===
"Pests" received extremely positive reviews from critics. The review aggregator website Rotten Tomatoes reported an 100% approval rating for the episode, based on 14 reviews. The site's consensus states: "'Pests' heightens the tension of this season's arc while advancing relationships and inching viewers closer to some inevitable key reveals - and retaining the show's dark sense of humor."

Eric Goldman of IGN gave the episode a "great" 8.7 out of 10 and wrote in his verdict, "The situation with the Jennings and the Beemans has been a powder keg since The Americans began, but it's never been more dangerous (and thus exciting) than it is now – even while the two families are closer than ever. Meanwhile, we're learning how Oleg's story is in fact tied back to Stan (and why it's worth still following Oleg's story), as much as Stan wishes it weren't."

Erik Adams of The A.V. Club gave the episode a "B" grade and wrote, "Delicate forms of faith and trust are being undermined in the aptly named 'Pests.' It's an hour that’s heavy on negotiation and light on the espionage whizzbang, and for those reasons drags in certain spots. But it still pulls out a set-piece or two, like Elizabeth's infiltration of the greenhouse and the latest exercises in Paige's training regimen. Or that Eckert-Morozov family dinner at Bennigan's, a garish display of American prosperity that even manages to pierce Tuan’s defenses."

Alan Sepinwall of Uproxx wrote, "The Americans is a show about marriage and parenthood, but because Philip and Elizabeth are deep cover Soviet spies, all the familiar family conflicts become much bigger than if they were really the all-American travel agents they claim to be. Rarely, though, has that magnification been more apparent — or unsettling — than what goes on between Paige and her parents throughout the events of 'Pests.'" Anthony Breznican of Entertainment Weekly wrote, "'It's just a little thing, but if you practice it, it will always be there for you,' Philip says. Just a little thing. Insignificant. But this episode shows that those are sometimes the things that matter most."

Mike Hale of The New York Times wrote, "Tuesday's episode of The Americans was quiet, dark and ominous. It was transitional — no one died, no big secrets were revealed, but uneasiness reigned." Scott Tobias of Vulture gave the episode a 4 star rating out of 5 and wrote, "Whenever The Americans reaches the crucial moment in which Stan finds out the truth about the Jennings, that same feeling of betrayal, humiliation, and powerlessness will grip him again, and whatever idealistic motives he once had about joining the intelligence community will be rendered a distant memory. What 'Pests' emphasizes in that driveway exchange and throughout the rest of the episode is that Stan and Philip are in the same boat, even though only Philip knows it right now."

Ben Travers of IndieWire gave the episode an "A–" grade and wrote, "Knowing what they've gone through before, how exposed they are presently, and with Paige serving as the wild card that could be played at any moment, 'Pests' continued to amp up the tension while allowing much-needed comedic relief." Ed Gonzalez of Slant Magazine wrote, "Certainly, this series has yet to run out of ways to show how the political informs the personal, and at its finest, 'Pests' thrillingly plants the seeds of a whirlwind of emotional reckonings."

Alec Bojalad of Den of Geek gave the episode a 4 star rating out of 5 and wrote, "'Pests' is another stellar entry in the show's catalogue. Since the last 15 minutes or so of last week's premiere functioned more as an epilogue for season 4 than a real beginning for season 5, this episode shoulders a heavier burden than most second episodes. 'Pests' has to get the story really started, show us where we are and where we going. Thankfully, it's up to the task." Matt Brennan of Paste gave the episode an 8 out of 10 and wrote, "It might appear as though The Americans can fit into the space between your thumb and your forefinger, but 'Pests,' like 'Amber Waves,' is a reminder of the power to be found in the small and the 'slow.'"
