= Immersion (The Americans) =

- The Americans episode
- Episode no.: Season 5 Episode 8
- Directed by: Kevin Bray
- Written by: Tracey Scott Wilson
- Cinematography by: Daniel Stoloff
- Editing by: Amanda Pollack
- Production code: BDU508
- Original air date: April 25, 2017
- Running time: 47 minutes

Guest appearances
- Snezhana Chernova as Yelena Burova; Irina Dvorovenko as Evgheniya Morozova; Darya Ekamasova as Sofia Kovalenko; Boris Krutonog as Igor Burov; Clea Lewis as Deirdre Kemp; Ivan Mok as Tuan Eckert; Sacha Slobodyanik as Major Kuznetsov; Oleg Stefan as Anatoly Viktorovich; Brett Tucker as Benjamin Stobert; Margo Martindale as Claudia

Episode chronology
| ← Previous "The Committee on Human Rights" | Next → "IHOP" |
- The Americans season 5

"Immersion" is the eighth episode of the fifth season of the American period spy drama television series The Americans. It is the 60th overall episode of the series and was written by supervising producer Tracey Scott Wilson, and directed by Kevin Bray. It was released on FX on April 25, 2017.

The series is set during the Cold War and follows Elizabeth and Philip Jennings, two Soviet KGB intelligence officers posing as an American married couple living in Falls Church, a Virginia suburb of Washington, D.C., with their American-born children Paige and Henry. It also explores the conflict between Washington's FBI office and the KGB Rezidentura there, from the perspectives of agents on both sides, including the Jennings' neighbor Stan Beeman, an FBI agent working in counterintelligence. In the episode, Philip and Elizabeth reunite with Claudia as their handler, while Oleg is investigated in Moscow.

According to Nielsen Media Research, the episode was seen by an estimated 0.76 million household viewers and gained a 0.2 ratings share among adults aged 18–49. The episode received generally positive reviews from critics, although there was criticism towards the pacing and lack of progress.

== Plot ==
After bidding farewell to Gabriel, Philip (Matthew Rhys) returns home, telling Elizabeth (Keri Russell) that Gabriel felt recruiting Paige (Holly Taylor) was a mistake. Claudia (Margo Martindale) is re-assigned as their handler, and they warn her about trying to manipulate them again.

Elizabeth continues meeting with Evgheniya (Irina Dvorovenko), who tells her that she is hosting an "immersion" event where everyone will have to speak in Russian. Elizabeth decides to postpone meeting with Ben (Brett Tucker), wanting to focus on the meeting and finding any possible moles within KGB. Knowing she is hurt over Ben's affair, Philip also calls Deidre (Clea Lewis) to cancel their meeting. To his surprise, she decides to end their relationship. Philip and Elizabeth follow Evgheniya to the event, only to discover that the event was a ruse and that she is involved in an extramarital affair. Claudia informs them that the man is a candidate for Deputy Chief of the CIA's Moscow station, intending to have Evgheniya back in Moscow. To motivate her, Elizabeth and Philip agree with Tuan (Ivan Mok) in having kids bully Pasha at school.

In Moscow, Oleg (Costa Ronin) is visited by Major Kuznetsov (Sacha Slobodyanik), who has PGU officers inspect his bedroom. He reluctantly allows them, but the officers do not find anything. Oleg then asks Anatoly (Oleg Stefan) about it, but the latter claims he was not involved and that Oleg's visit to the archives wouldn't prompt PGU to suspect him.

At a museum, Stan (Noah Emmerich) and Aderholt (Brandon J. Dirden) meet with Sofia (Darya Ekamasova), finally getting her to reveal some information by paying her. While training with Paige, Elizabeth opens up about Nikolai Timoshev, revealing that he raped her. She explains how she had to picture Nikolai every time she fought, surprising Paige. Elizabeth also motivates Philip in trying to reconnect with Deidre for their mission. She picks up the phone while he is leaving a message admitting he is married. Later, Elizabeth and Paige take a walk in order to talk about their experiences.

== Production ==
=== Development ===
In March 2017, FX confirmed that the eighth episode of the season would be titled "Immersion", and that it would be written by supervising producer Tracey Scott Wilson, and directed by Kevin Bray. This was Wilson's seventh writing credit, and Bray's first directing credit.

=== Filming ===
Filming for the episode wrapped by January 24, 2017.

== Reception ==
=== Viewers ===
In its original American broadcast, "Immersion" was seen by an estimated 0.76 million household viewers with a 0.2 in the 18-49 demographics. This means that 0.2 percent of all households with televisions watched the episode. This was a slight decrease in viewership from the previous episode, which was watched by 0.79 million household viewers with a 0.2 in the 18-49 demographics.

=== Critical reviews ===
"Immersion" received generally positive reviews from critics. The review aggregator website Rotten Tomatoes reported a 92% approval rating for the episode, based on 12 reviews. The site's consensus states: "'Immersion' establishes subtle parallels through multiple narrative strands, patiently setting the stage for the inexorable eruption of long-simmering conflicts."

Dennis Perkins of The A.V. Club gave the episode an "A–" grade and wrote, "'Immersion' reveals how the show's taut web of relationships doesn't need flashy action to thrum with tension. Hardly anything of note happens here, and it's riveting nonetheless, every conversation vibrating with things known and things unspoken."

Alan Sepinwall of Uproxx wrote, "I trust that Fields and Weisberg have a great plan for that final year, and I suspect there will be some moments over this season's last five episodes that will punch me hard in the stomach the way The Americans likes to do. But something's been lacking for a lot of this year, and 'Immersion' helped me recognize it." Anthony Breznican of Entertainment Weekly wrote, "Last week's episode of The Americans is tough to top. It was the best of the season, and led to a new theory about how Oleg Burov may fit into the overall Elizabeth/Philip puzzle. This one has more tension than some previous episodes, but it returns to place-setting for action that may take place in the final episodes of the season."

Mike Hale of The New York Times wrote, "The episode, titled 'Immersion,' added one more week to the fire for those of you complaining about a lack of action this season. And with the season roughly 60 percent over, I can't blame you. But I'm not minding the contemplative slow build when it's done as well as this. And the gradually growing closeness between Elizabeth and Paige, which took center stage this episode, has been a nice development." Scott Tobias of Vulture gave the episode a 4 star rating out of 5 and wrote, "It seems likely her life's work is not motivated wholly by ideology, but a need to gain back the power and control that she lost when she was a teenager. When Paige steps in to comfort her, she pushes her away, unwilling even now to allow herself to be wholly vulnerable."

Emily St. James of Vox wrote, "Structurally, the season has so many balls in the air that if this were any other series, I would be sort of nervous about some of them being dropped. But The Americans has never really had the chance to try this kind of 'everything’s up in the air' story, because it's never had the benefit of knowing another season is coming." Ed Gonzalez of Slant Magazine wrote, "Another week, another episode of The Americans that's notable for its pervasive lack of hurry."

Alec Bojalad of Den of Geek gave the episode a 4.5 star rating out of 5 and wrote, "'Immersion' is another excellent episode of The Americans (most are) because it gives us the tiniest peak at all the various burdens and unspoken transformative experiences these characters carry around. Elizabeth's burden might just be the largest... and that's why she appears the strongest." Matt Brennan of Paste gave the episode a 7.8 out of 10 and wrote, "At a glance, 'Immersion' seems as soft as a whisper, but as with much of The Americans' fifth season, its echo carries far."
