= Lotus 1-2-3 (The Americans) =

- The Americans episode
- Episode no.: Season 5 Episode 5
- Directed by: Noah Emmerich
- Written by: Joshua Brand
- Cinematography by: Joseph Bradley Smith
- Editing by: Amanda Pollack
- Production code: BDU505
- Original air date: April 4, 2017
- Running time: 46 minutes

Guest appearances
- Daniel Flaherty as Matthew Beeman; Laurie Holden as Renee; Peter Jacobson as Agent Wolfe; Anthony Arkin as Stavos; Snezhana Chernova as Yelena Burova; Irina Dvorovenko as Evgheniya Morozova; Zack Gafin as Pasha Morozov; Ravil Isyanov as Ruslan; Boris Krutonog as Igor Burov; Polly Lee as Joan; Clea Lewis as Deirdre Kemp; Leonid A. Mandel as Dmitri Sharonov; Ivan Mok as Tuan Eckert; Alex Ozerov as Mischa Semenov; Brett Tucker as Benjamin Stobert; Margo Martindale as Claudia; Frank Langella as Gabriel

Episode chronology
← Previous "What's the Matter with Kansas?"	Next → "Crossbreed"
- The Americans season 5

"Lotus 1-2-3" is the fifth episode of the fifth season of the American period spy drama television series The Americans. It is the 57th overall episode of the series and was written by consulting producer Joshua Brand, and directed by main cast member Noah Emmerich. It was released on FX on April 4, 2017.

The series is set during the Cold War and follows Elizabeth and Philip Jennings, two Soviet KGB intelligence officers posing as an American married couple living in Falls Church, a Virginia suburb of Washington, D.C., with their American-born children Paige and Henry. It also explores the conflict between Washington's FBI office and the KGB Rezidentura there, from the perspectives of agents on both sides, including the Jennings' neighbor Stan Beeman, an FBI agent working in counterintelligence. In the episode, Philip and Elizabeth continue spending time with Deidre and Ben, while Mischa arrives in Washington, D.C.

According to Nielsen Media Research, the episode was seen by an estimated 0.70 million household viewers and gained a 0.2 ratings share among adults aged 18–49. The episode received critical acclaim, praising the writing, directing, performances, themes and plot progression.

== Plot ==
Philip (Matthew Rhys) and Elizabeth (Keri Russell) continue their respective missions, both with Alexei and Topeka, Kansas. They also meet with a teacher to discuss Henry (Keidrich Sellati), discovering that he is excelling in his grades and the teacher suggests moving him to a more advanced math class. They are overjoyed at the news, although Henry is not delighted.

Seeing that Stan (Noah Emmerich) is now allowing Renee (Laurie Holden) to stay at his house, Philip starts to wonder Renee's real identity. As part of their mission, Philip and Elizabeth have sex with Deirdre (Clea Lewis) and Ben (Brett Tucker) respectively, but both experience uneasiness with their actions. Arriving in Washington, D.C., Mischa (Alex Ozerov) contacts the Centre, per Irina's instructions. Gabriel (Frank Langella) considers informing Philip about Mischa's arrival, but Claudia (Margo Martindale) states Philip will lose faith in the KGB if he finds that Mischa was in a mental institution.

In Moscow, Oleg (Costa Ronin) and Ruslan (Ravil Isyanov) visit Dmitri Sharonov (Leonid A. Mandel), who refuses to cooperate. He is forced to comply when Ruslan threatens his son's life, as he is serving in the Soviet–Afghan War. Oleg returns home, and rejects his parents' attempt in setting him up with some women. He decides to finally accept the CIA's offer, but he is unable to find the agents following him.

Philip follows Renee to her apartment, but finds nothing incriminatory. At a park, Mischa is approached by Gabriel, who tells him he cannot meet Philip right now as it could blow his cover. He then offers in taking him back to the USSR, saying he will meet Philip eventually. While visiting Ben, Elizabeth finds that his job involves developing a pest-resistant strain of wheat, realizing that the United States are not involved in the starvation crisis in the USSR. When she reveals this to Philip, he is devastated upon learning that he killed an innocent, Randy, during the mission. Philip expresses his displeasure for his job, and both promise to not allow this to happen again.

== Production ==
=== Development ===
In March 2017, FX confirmed that the fifth episode of the season would be titled "Lotus 1-2-3", and that it would be written by consulting producer Joshua Brand, and directed by main cast member Noah Emmerich. This was Brand's eleventh writing credit, and Emmerich's third directing credit.

=== Filming ===
Filming for the episode started on December 1, 2016.

== Reception ==
=== Viewers ===
In its original American broadcast, "Lotus 1-2-3" was seen by an estimated 0.70 million household viewers with a 0.2 in the 18-49 demographics. This means that 0.2 percent of all households with televisions watched the episode. This was a 22% decrease in viewership from the previous episode, which was watched by 0.89 million household viewers with a 0.3 in the 18-49 demographics.

=== Critical reviews ===
"Lotus 1-2-3" received critical acclaim. The review aggregator website Rotten Tomatoes reported an 100% approval rating for the episode, based on 14 reviews. The site's consensus states: "Deftly weaving disparate narrative strands, building to a gut-wrenching revelation, and finally closing on a quietly poignant note, 'Lotus 1-2-3' adds another pitch-perfect entry to The Americans' riveting saga."

Erik Adams of The A.V. Club gave the episode an "A" grade and wrote, "'Lotus 1-2-3' is the third episode of The Americans directed by Noah Emmerich, and the producers just keep on handing him bombshells. This week's episode doesn't contain anything as earth-shattering as the 'Walter Taffet' abduction or the wig reveal in 'Clark's Place', but it is a tense affair. It's also a unique blend of tones for the series."

Alan Sepinwall of Uproxx wrote, "What an extraordinary episode, and particularly in those closing minutes. The Americans tends to be at its best when Philip's emotional state is at its worst, and boy howdy is he not in a good place right now." Anthony Breznican of Entertainment Weekly wrote, "The pace picks up a little bit in this episode as we finally come to understand the nature of the agriculture program Philip and Elizabeth are investigating and suspicions about Stan’s new girlfriend are vocalized by our antiheroes."

Mike Hale of The New York Times wrote, "One thing seems sure: Whatever happens over the final season and a half, Philip and Elizabeth won’t turn on each other. It will be united-family heroics (possibly with the exception of Henry) at the end. As Philip said when Elizabeth volunteered to do all the killing from now on: 'No. It's us.'" Scott Tobias of Vulture scored the episode a perfect five out of five and wrote, "There are so many beautiful scenes in 'Lotus 1-2-3,' as emotionally devastating an episode as The Americans has ever produced, that it can be easy to overlook the one that accounts for all the others."

Emily St. James of Vox wrote, "'Lotus' is otherwise an excellent entry in a season that continues to keep lots and lots of plates spinning without sending them hurtling into each other." Ed Gonzalez of Slant Magazine wrote, "There's a messiness to this episode's narrative shards that are intriguingly united by the sense that every character on the show is at some kind of impasse. At times, though, 'Lotus 1-2-3' is too self-conscious by half to tell us as much."

Alec Bojalad of Den of Geek gave the episode a perfect five out of five, and wrote, "Hey, this is a good show. Obviously that is a thought I've encountered quite a few times in the five seasons I've watched The Americans. But for some reason it rattled around my brain in giant, glowing neon letters throughout almost the entirety of 'Lotus 1-2-3'." Matt Brennan of Paste gave the episode an 8.7 out of 10 and wrote, "Despite its moments of levity, then 'Lotus 1-2-3' underscores the profound loneliness that accrues to those for whom an inconsequential conversation is also an intricate disguise; it bristles with strange codes and strained silences, against which its moments of communion appear fragile, imperfect, small."
