= The Committee on Human Rights =

- The Americans episode
- Episode no.: Season 5 Episode 7
- Directed by: Matthew Rhys
- Written by: Hilary Bettis
- Cinematography by: Joseph Bradley Smith
- Editing by: Daniel Valverde
- Production code: BDU507
- Original air date: April 18, 2017
- Running time: 46 minutes

Guest appearances
- Kelly AuCoin as Pastor Tim; Daniel Flaherty as Matthew Beeman; Laurie Holden as Renee; Peter Jacobson as Agent Wolfe; Snezhana Chernova as Yelena Burova; Darya Ekamasova as Sofia Kovalenko; Clea Lewis as Deirdre Kemp; Brett Tucker as Benjamin Stobert; Frank Langella as Gabriel

Episode chronology
← Previous "Crossbreed"	Next → "Immersion"
- The Americans season 5

"The Committee on Human Rights" is the seventh episode of the fifth season of the American period spy drama television series The Americans. It is the 59th overall episode of the series and was written by Hilary Bettis, and directed by main cast member Matthew Rhys. It was released on FX on April 18, 2017.

The series is set during the Cold War and follows Elizabeth and Philip Jennings, two Soviet KGB intelligence officers posing as an American married couple living in Falls Church, a Virginia suburb of Washington, D.C., with their American-born children Paige and Henry. It also explores the conflict between Washington's FBI office and the KGB Rezidentura there, from the perspectives of agents on both sides, including the Jennings' neighbor Stan Beeman, an FBI agent working in counterintelligence. In the episode, Paige meets Gabriel, while Stan receives bad news at the FBI.

According to Nielsen Media Research, the episode was seen by an estimated 0.79 million household viewers and gained a 0.2 ratings share among adults aged 18–49. The episode received positive reviews from critics, praising the performances and writing, although some criticized the pacing.

== Plot ==
Paige (Holly Taylor) talks to Gabriel (Frank Langella), learning how he has helped Philip (Matthew Rhys) and Elizabeth (Keri Russell) for many years. The encounter seems to impact Paige, as she finally realizes that Gabriel was always part of her family. Philip and Elizabeth decide not to tell her about their discovery at the greenhouse, leaving Paige believing the lie that the US plans to destroy Soviet grain crops.

Elizabeth steals a file from a psychiatrist containing the names and addresses of Soviet dissidents, named "Committee on Human Rights." With this, they drive to Bolivar County, Mississippi in order to follow Ben (Brett Tucker) at a field where he watches over the wheat. They also follow him to Memphis, discovering that Ben is seeing another woman. Paige confides in Pastor Tim (Kelly AuCoin) that the encounter with Gabriel made her reconsider some aspects in her life. Later, she decides to break up with Matthew (Daniel Flaherty).

Stan (Noah Emmerich) and Aderholt (Brandon J. Dirden) meet with Sofia (Darya Ekamasova), a Soviet woman who works at TASS. Sofia is scared about her son's safety, and Stan's attitude does not convince her in becoming an informant. Later, Stan is informed by Wolfe (Peter Jacobson) that he will be transferred out of his field when the operation with Sofia ends. This impacts Stan's date with Renee (Laurie Holden), so he opens up more about his work. In Moscow, Oleg (Costa Ronin) tells Yelena (Snezhana Chernova) about having lost contact with the CIA agents. He later finds Yelena's captivity record in a labor camp.

Elizabeth delivers a sample of the pest-resistant wheat to Gabriel before he leaves. As she stays with Paige to console her break-up, Philip visits Gabriel at his apartment. Gabriel opens up about his past in USSR, admitting that he did horrible things because he was scared of any repercussions. Philip then asks if Renee is a KGB agent, but Gabriel is unsure. As Gabriel exits the apartment, he admits that having Paige recruited was a mistake.

== Production ==
=== Development ===
In March 2017, FX confirmed that the seventh episode of the season would be titled "The Committee on Human Rights", and that it would be written by Hilary Bettis, and directed by main cast member Matthew Rhys. This was Bettis's first writing credit, and Rhys's second directing credit.

=== Filming ===
Filming for the episode wrapped by January 12, 2017.

== Reception ==
=== Viewers ===
In its original American broadcast, "The Committee on Human Rights" was seen by an estimated 0.79 million household viewers with a 0.2 in the 18-49 demographics. This means that 0.2 percent of all households with televisions watched the episode. This was a 11% increase in viewership from the previous episode, which was watched by 0.71 million household viewers with a 0.2 in the 18-49 demographics.

=== Critical reviews ===
"The Committee on Human Rights" received positive reviews. The review aggregator website Rotten Tomatoes reported an 100% approval rating, based on 13 reviews. The site's consensus states: "'The Committee on Human Rights' kicks at the underpinnings of its central characters' convictions just as they're forced to say goodbye to an important ally."

Dennis Perkins of The A.V. Club gave the episode an "A–" grade and wrote, "Everyone involved in the various types of espionage on The Americans makes sacrifices most of us would find abhorrent or simply unthinkable. And everyone attempts to make peace with the lives they are able to fashion from the pieces left to them. The lure and enduring power of the series is in watching people make impossible choices between the greater good as they understand it and the need to simply be a person."

Alan Sepinwall of Uproxx wrote, "'The Committee On Human Rights' is an alternately frustrating and fascinating episode ...though many of the frustrating parts feel intentional". Anthony Breznican of Entertainment Weekly wrote, "The problem with finally opening up and being honest is discovering all the past betrayals of someone you trusted. This episode of The Americans has apparently sent KGB handler Gabriel on his way, but his final line to Philip is simultaneously a refreshing moment of candor and a knife in the heart. Now he tells him?"

Mike Hale of The New York Times wrote, "There wasn't a lot of happiness to go around in The Americans this week. And that was despite seeing Elizabeth and Philip score what may be the greatest triumph of their careers: stealing a stalk of super wheat from a Mississippi field and delivering it to Gabriel, who planned to take it with him back to Moscow where it could help feed the hungry Soviet masses." Scott Tobias of Vulture gave the episode four out of five and wrote, "Gabriel's retirement either betrays a lack of faith or portends developments that he can't contain. Either way, Project Paige is headed for the rocks."

Caroline Framke of Vox wrote, "Getting renewed for two seasons at once might have made The Americans feel like it could afford to take its sweet time, even this deep into the season. And there were plenty of moments where 'The Committee on Human Rights' seemed especially slow." Ed Gonzalez of Slant Magazine wrote, "The sincerity with which one arrives at self-truths is a thematic thread that's run throughout this season of The Americans and is very much front and center in 'The Committee on Human Rights.'"

Alec Bojalad of Den of Geek scored the episode four out of five, and wrote, "If there ever were an episode of The Americans to get pedantic over the little details over, it's 'The Committee on Human Rights.' 'The Committee on Human Rights' is probably the kind of Americans episode that most non-Americans converts assume every episode to be. It's anticlimactic and a touch humorless. It seems kind of like an end to an unofficial trilogy that began two weeks ago with the 'Lotus 1-2-3' reveal that the Americans weren't destroying crops and even then there is little resolution in this arbitrary trilogy." Matt Brennan of Paste gave the episode eight out of ten and wrote, "This is the shadow the series casts on its characters, the oblique angle at which their secrets intersect with the wider world, to the point that the neighbor's new girlfriend, the long day at work, even the notions of 'courage' and 'sacrifice' appear as if through a glass, darkly."
