= What's the Matter with Kansas? (The Americans) =

- The Americans episode
- Episode no.: Season 5 Episode 4
- Directed by: Gwyneth Horder-Payton
- Written by: Peter Ackerman
- Cinematography by: Daniel Stoloff
- Editing by: Daniel Valverde
- Production code: BDU504
- Original air date: March 28, 2017
- Running time: 46 minutes

Guest appearances
- Kelly AuCoin as Pastor Tim; Laurie Holden as Renee; Cotter Smith as Deputy Attorney General; Snezhana Chernova as Yelena Burova; Suzy Jane Hunt as Alice; Ravil Isyanov as Ruslan; Alla Kliouka as Ekaterina Rykova; Clea Lewis as Deirdre Kemp; Alex Ozerov as Mischa Semenov; Zoran Radanovich as Vaso; Alexander Sokovikov as Alexei Morozov; Oleg Stefan as Anatoly Viktorovich; Brett Tucker as Benjamin Stobert; Frank Langella as Gabriel

Episode chronology
← Previous "The Midges"	Next → "Lotus 1-2-3"
- The Americans season 5

"What's the Matter with Kansas?" is the fourth episode of the fifth season of the American period spy drama television series The Americans. It is the 56th overall episode of the series and was written by supervising producer Peter Ackerman, and directed by Gwyneth Horder-Payton. It was released on FX on March 28, 2017.

The series is set during the Cold War and follows Elizabeth and Philip Jennings, two Soviet KGB intelligence officers posing as an American married couple living in Falls Church, a Virginia suburb of Washington, D.C., with their American-born children Paige and Henry. It also explores the conflict between Washington's FBI office and the KGB Rezidentura there, from the perspectives of agents on both sides, including the Jennings' neighbor Stan Beeman, an FBI agent working in counterintelligence. In the episode, Philip and Elizabeth follow two employees in Kansas, while Stan puts his career in risk in order to protect Oleg.

According to Nielsen Media Research, the episode was seen by an estimated 0.89 million household viewers and gained a 0.3 ratings share among adults aged 18–49. The episode received extremely positive reviews from critics, praising the performances, tension and character development.

== Plot ==
Philip (Matthew Rhys) and Elizabeth (Keri Russell) inform Gabriel (Frank Langella) about the facility in Topeka, Kansas where the eggs are sent. Gabriel then assigns them in following two employees, Deirdre Kemp and Benjamin Stobert. They reluctantly accept the "honey trapping" operation, even as it will make their lives more difficult due to constant travel.

In Topeka, Philip struggles in connecting with Deirdre at a gym, while Elizabeth gets along with Benjamin. They also dine with Stan (Noah Emmerich) and Renee (Laurie Holden), avoiding talking so much of their past when Renee claims to have a relative in Philip's supposed birthplace. Paige (Holly Taylor) helps Pastor Tim (Kelly AuCoin) and Alice (Suzy Jane Hunt) by babysitting Claire Louise. After they leave, she decides to read Tim's diary to find anything suspicious. She reports this to Elizabeth, who tells her to not do it again.

In Moscow, Oleg (Costa Ronin) is assigned a new OBKhSS partner, Ruslan (Ravil Isyanov). They once again visit Ekaterina (Alla Kliouka), with Ruslan's intimidating tactics making her give out the name of her contact. They give the name of the contact, Dmitri Sharanov, to Anatoly (Oleg Stefan), although Oleg does not hide his disdain for Ruslan's tactics. Oleg later visits Yelena (Snezhana Chernova), confiding that his life is now in danger after an incriminating cassette appeared. She states that she had to survive five years on a prison camp and that he needs to do whatever it takes to survive. In Ljubljana, Vaso (Zoran Radanovich) hides Mischa (Alex Ozerov) in a box in his car's trunk and sneaks him into Austria with the help of a friend who provokes the border patrol while Vaso's car is being inspected.

Unwilling to let the CIA blackmail Oleg, Stan confesses to the Deputy Attorney General (Cotter Smith) that he killed Vlad and threatens to publicly disclose it unless they stop their plan. Mischa is seen arriving at the John F. Kennedy International Airport. That night, Elizabeth tells Philip about Paige's actions. While outraged, she wonders if they can use the diary to their advantage.

== Production ==
=== Development ===
In February 2017, FX confirmed that the fourth episode of the season would be titled "What's the Matter with Kansas?", and that it would be written by supervising producer Peter Ackerman, and directed by Gwyneth Horder-Payton. This was Ackerman's sixth writing credit, and Horder-Payton's first directing credit.

=== Filming ===
Filming for the episode started on November 22, 2016, and wrapped by November 28, 2016.

== Reception ==
=== Viewers ===
In its original American broadcast, "What's the Matter with Kansas?" was seen by an estimated 0.89 million household viewers with a 0.3 in the 18-49 demographics. This means that 0.3 percent of all households with televisions watched the episode. This was a 11% increase in viewership from the previous episode, which was watched by 0.80 million household viewers with a 0.2 in the 18-49 demographics.

=== Critical reviews ===
"What's the Matter with Kansas?" received extremely positive reviews from critics. The review aggregator website Rotten Tomatoes reported a 92% approval rating for the episode, based on 13 reviews. The site's consensus states: "The stirring, deceptively simple 'What's the Matter with Kansas?' probes the deepening layers of entanglements weighing on Philip, Elizabeth and Stan."

Erik Adams of The A.V. Club gave the episode an "A–" grade and wrote, "'What's The Matter With Kansas?' is a movingly and plainly stated hour of The Americans. The motivations are bigger than any individual, but they're smaller than geopolitical powers. It's about the families: The one Philip and Elizabeth have; the one Stan could have."

Alan Sepinwall of Uproxx wrote, "At the start of the episode, both are assigned to begin new sexual conquests for the sake of the job, and neither of them wants to do it. But their reasons are a lot more complicated than they seem at first." Anthony Breznican of Entertainment Weekly wrote, "In this installment of The Americans, Philip struggles with how to engage an especially dull target. That's sort of how I felt about this whole episode. After three stellar opening shows, the fourth one of this season just feels like it's running in place."

Mike Hale of The New York Times wrote, "There was no action in this week’s episode of The Americans. I mean that literally: In a week with no murders or chases, the most active scene consisted of Paige's walking around Pastor Tim's house. And I mean it more figuratively: In a week when the focus was on sex, no one was getting any." Scott Tobias of Vulture gave the episode a 4 star rating out of 5 and wrote, "Frank's book is not a period reference, and the show's ideological battleground doesn't include cultural wedge issues like abortion and gay rights. Broadly speaking, however, What's the Matter With Kansas? shares with The Americans the possibility of shifting political allegiances, and ideologies that perhaps aren't as rigid as they appear to be."

Emily St. James of Vox wrote, "'What's the Matter with Kansas?' is a deceptively simple episode that reveals layers of complexity in its last act. There's little of the "WE'RE NEARING THE END!" table setting that defined the season's first couple of hours, nor a set piece as memorable as the visit to the lab in 'The Midges.' But there was that lovely and lonely little scene at the end, Philip and Elizabeth in bed, with her reasserting her deep love for him by pointing out that she believes her new mark is trying actively to destroy the Soviet Union, and Philip by implication is not." Ed Gonzalez of Slant Magazine wrote, "Funny isn't something that The Americans often does, and 'What's the Matter with Kansas?' is unique in the canon of the series for the sterling self-reflexivity of its sense of humor."

Alec Bojalad of Den of Geek gave the episode a 4.5 star rating out of 5 and wrote, "Paige's interest in spying reflects her parents' values. There's nothing the matter with Kansas or America or Paige. Everything is fine. But the mere knowledge that she might one day connect with the 'real' version of herself. The version that knows she is Russian like her parents drives her like nothing else." Matt Brennan of Paste gave the episode an 8.4 out of 10 and wrote, "Though it might seem a soft landing after the dramatic heights of 'The Midges,' 'What's the Matter with Kansas?' treats this topic with the series' usual rigor, its methodical arrangement of images and ideas building, in the course of an hour, to an artful, emotionally resonant whole."
