= IHOP (The Americans) =

- The Americans episode
- Episode no.: Season 5 Episode 9
- Directed by: Dan Attias
- Written by: Peter Ackerman
- Cinematography by: Joseph Bradley Smith
- Editing by: Sheri Bylander; Katie Ennis
- Production code: BDU509
- Original air date: May 2, 2017
- Running time: 48 minutes

Guest appearances
- Julia Garner as Kimberly "Kimmy" Breland; Peter Jacobson as Agent Wolfe; Anthony Arkin as Stavos; Snezhana Chernova as Yelena Burova; Frank Deal as Isaac Breland; Irina Dvorovenko as Evgheniya Morozova; Christine Toy Johnson as Linh Gaad; Boris Krutonog as Igor Burov; Konstantin Lavysh as Father Andrei; Polly Lee as Joan; Leonid A. Mandel as Dmitri Sharonov; Ivan Mok as Tuan Eckert; Sacha Slobodyanik as Major Kuznetsov; Aleksey Solodov as Captain Staponov; Frank Langella as Gabriel; Alison Wright as Martha Hanson (special guest star)

Episode chronology
| ← Previous "Immersion" | Next → "Darkroom" |
- The Americans season 5

"IHOP" is the ninth episode of the fifth season of the American period spy drama television series The Americans. It is the 61st overall episode of the series and was written by supervising producer Peter Ackerman, and directed by Dan Attias. It was released on FX on May 2, 2017.

The series is set during the Cold War and follows Elizabeth and Philip Jennings, two Soviet KGB intelligence officers posing as an American married couple living in Falls Church, a Virginia suburb of Washington, D.C., with their American-born children Paige and Henry. It also explores the conflict between Washington's FBI office and the KGB Rezidentura there, from the perspectives of agents on both sides, including the Jennings' neighbor Stan Beeman, an FBI agent working in counterintelligence. In the episode, Philip and Elizabeth suspect Tuan is hiding something, while Stan gets involved again in Gaad's murder.

According to Nielsen Media Research, the episode was seen by an estimated 0.68 million household viewers and gained a 0.2 ratings share among adults aged 18–49. The episode received extremely positive reviews from critics, praising the performances, themes and the meeting between Gabriel and Martha.

== Plot ==
While visiting Kimmy (Julia Garner) for her birthday, Philip (Matthew Rhys) changes a tape inside her father's briefcase. He retrieves the previous tape, which recorded Isaac (Frank Deal) stating that Mujahideen were killed with a Lassa virus. Later, he discusses with Elizabeth (Keri Russell) over Tuan (Ivan Mok), as they feel he is quite reserved in his life.

Tuan does not show up for an appointed meeting, worrying Philip and Elizabeth. Philip meets with one of Gabriel's other agents, a Russian priest named Father Andrei (Konstantin Lavysh). Later, Henry (Keidrich Sellati) tells his parents that he wants to leave for a boarding school in New Hampshire to be close to his love interest. They are divided over the idea, especially as Henry already applied for the school. Elizabeth supports his decision, while Philip believes Henry is not ready for something like that. Meanwhile, Wolfe (Peter Jacobson) informs Stan (Noah Emmerich) that the KGB was involved in Gaad's murder, surprising him. Stan visits Gaad's widow, Linh (Christine Toy Johnson), who suspects that Gaad was murdered as he wanted revenge on the Soviets.

In Moscow, Martha (Alison Wright) is visited by Gabriel (Frank Langella) at her apartment. She relates how difficult it is to live in the country, forcing her to learn Russian. Still mad over his involvement in leaving her American life, Martha kicks him out of the apartment. Oleg (Costa Ronin) is questioned by Major Kuznetsov (Sacha Slobodyanik) over his connections in America. He confides in some of the operations, although he distorts some truth in his relationships with Stan and Nina. He later confronts his father Igor (Boris Krutonog) over her mother's imprisonment in a labor camp, and he claims he still loved her even if the events affected her life. Later, Oleg visits Dmitri (Leonid A. Mandel) in prison, convincing him to name his supplier, Lydia Formina.

Philip and Elizabeth track Tuan to Harrisburg, Pennsylvania, seeing him enter an IHOP. When he finally returns to the house, he is confronted by Philip and Elizabeth over his constant absences. He states that his brother from his foster family was diagnosed with leukemia and he was checking out on him by trying to evade surveillance. He asks them not to report the incident, as he would be sent back to Vietnam. As they drive back home, Philip and Elizabeth question Tuan's feelings and whether he actually wants to get involved in their operations.

== Production ==
=== Development ===
In April 2017, FX confirmed that the ninth episode of the season would be titled "IHOP", and that it would be written by supervising producer Peter Ackerman, and directed by Dan Attias. This was Ackerman's seventh writing credit, and Attias' fourth directing credit.

=== Filming ===
Filming for the episode wrapped by February 1, 2017.

== Reception ==
=== Viewers ===
In its original American broadcast, "IHOP" was seen by an estimated 0.68 million household viewers with a 0.2 in the 18-49 demographics. This means that 0.2 percent of all households with televisions watched the episode. This was a 11% decrease in viewership from the previous episode, which was watched by 0.76 million household viewers with a 0.2 in the 18-49 demographics.

=== Critical reviews ===
"IHOP" received extremely positive reviews from critics. The review aggregator website Rotten Tomatoes reported a 92% approval rating for the episode, based on 12 reviews.

Erik Adams of The A.V. Club gave the episode an "A" grade and wrote, "Surely, this is the last time we'll see this person, whose only mistake was getting tangled up in Soviet intelligence operations in the United States. Their departure will leave a that-character-sized hole in The Americans, one that some other supporting players could attempt to fill, but will never do so completely. It's a loss that's deeply felt, because The Americans pays attention to its characters, and you've always feared the worst for them."

Alan Sepinwall of Uproxx wrote, "It's a narrative problem for the series at the moment — so much is going on that none of the stories have room to develop into something as interesting as they could be — but it's also what the overall story is about: the Centre is asking much too much of Philip and Elizabeth, and things are starting to slip as a result." Anthony Breznican of Entertainment Weekly wrote, "In one episode, the Jenningses are set to lose both their sons."

Mike Hale of The New York Times wrote, "A lot of agita, but still not a lot of action this week on The Americans. A series of minor bombshells, building to — an explosion? Four episodes left." Scott Tobias of Vulture gave the episode a 4 star rating out of 5 and wrote, "Martha's reappearance aside, 'IHOP' is an episode about parents, children, and the consequential mistakes that can break them apart or foment pockets of resentment between them."

Emily St. James of Vox wrote, "'IHOP' probably isn't going to quiet this season's skeptics, but I thought it was the strongest episode of The Americans in a while, maybe of the whole season. That buzzy, dread-filled vibe the past few episodes built up threatens to explode throughout the hour but always calms down again at the last moment." Ed Gonzalez of Slant Magazine wrote, "Diehard fans of The Americans, particularly those who've learned to stop worrying about this fifth season's increasingly unclear endgame and love its tapestry of emotion-rich character moments, may have cried 'Uncle!' not even halfway through 'IHOP.' The episode feels less like a continuation of this season's efforts up to this point than a tangent — a revisiting of loose ends from past seasons."

Alec Bojalad of Den of Geek gave the episode a 3 star rating out of 5 and wrote, "'IHOP' undoubtedly wants us to draw some connections among all the children in the Jennings' life from Tuan to Kimmy all the way down to boring ol' Henry. It's just not clear what kind of connection or statement that it's trying to make." Matt Brennan of Paste gave the episode an 8.5 out of 10 and wrote, "If the five-episode arc that follows 'The Midges' boils The Americans down to its fundamental elements, its atomic weight, 'IHOP' sets in motion a process of fission that promises fireworks to come: It is as wide-ranging an episode as the series has ever delivered, reeling in the long ago and far away until the lines begin to seem like a net."
