= The Midges =

- The Americans episode
- Episode no.: Season 5 Episode 3
- Directed by: Stefan Schwartz
- Written by: Tracey Scott Wilson
- Cinematography by: Joseph Bradley Smith
- Editing by: Sheri Bylander
- Production code: BDU503
- Original air date: March 21, 2017
- Running time: 45 minutes

Guest appearances
- Daniel Flaherty as Matthew Beeman; Irina Dvorovenko as Evgheniya Morozova; Zack Gafin as Pasha Morozov; Alla Kliouka as Ekaterina Rykova; Brian McCarthy as Randy Chilton; Ivan Mok as Tuan Eckert; Alex Ozerov as Mischa Semenov; Zoran Radanovich as Vaso; Alexander Sokovikov as Alexei Morozov; Frank Langella as Gabriel; Alison Wright as Martha Hanson (special appearance)

Episode chronology
| ← Previous "Pests" | Next → "What's the Matter with Kansas?" |
- The Americans season 5

"The Midges" is the third episode of the fifth season of the American period spy drama television series The Americans. It is the 55th overall episode of the series and was written by supervising producer Tracey Scott Wilson, and directed by Stefan Schwartz. It was released on FX on March 21, 2017.

The series is set during the Cold War and follows Elizabeth and Philip Jennings, two Soviet KGB intelligence officers posing as an American married couple living in Falls Church, a Virginia suburb of Washington, D.C., with their American-born children Paige and Henry. It also explores the conflict between Washington's FBI office and the KGB Rezidentura there, from the perspectives of agents on both sides, including the Jennings' neighbor Stan Beeman, an FBI agent working in counterintelligence. In the episode, Philip and Elizabeth investigate more about the midges, while Oleg continues his assignment in Moscow.

According to Nielsen Media Research, the episode was seen by an estimated 0.80 million household viewers and gained a 0.2 ratings share among adults aged 18–49. The episode received extremely positive reviews from critics, praising the performances, tension and pacing.

== Plot ==
Philip (Matthew Rhys), Elizabeth (Keri Russell) and Tuan (Ivan Mok) meet with Alexei (Alexander Sokovikov), Evgheniya (Irina Dvorovenko) and Pasha (Zack Gafin) at a bowling alley. During this, Alexei gets into an argument with Evgheniya over his disdain for Russia, making Philip, Elizabeth and Tuan realize that he got his family to leave the country without informing them of his defection. On the drive home, they express their disdain for Alexei's treason.

Philip and Elizabeth decide to tell Paige (Holly Taylor) about the details of their mission. They also state that Alexei's actions are causing starvation in Russia, alarming Paige. During a date with Matthew (Daniel Flaherty), Paige employs her parents' technique in lying. While Elizabeth is impressed, Paige feels repulsed by having to live with lies. Gabriel (Frank Langella) informs Philip and Elizabeth that the midges are bred and studied at a lab in Oklahoma City and assigns them to investigate.

In Moscow, Oleg (Costa Ronin) visits a supermarket and questions the manager, Ekaterina (Alla Kliouka), over suspicion of bribery. She denies the claims, although Oleg is not convinced. As he walks through the supermarket, one of the clients is revealed to be Martha (Alison Wright). Oleg is confronted by the CIA agent, who gives him a cassette for missing their meeting. It contains Oleg's confession that Zinaida was a spy, making him realize that he could face repercussions if it gets leaked. In Ljubljana, Yugoslavia, Mischa (Alex Ozerov) arrives at a house in order to get help in getting into Austria. However, the handler has been arrested. Nevertheless, the handler's friend offers in helping him after getting most of Mischa's money.

In Oklahoma City, Philip and Elizabeth sneak into the lab to check the midges. However, they are interrupted when a biologist, Randy (Brian McCarthy), checks on the lab. Scared, Randy gives away vital information on the midges and another installation where the eggs are sent. Afterwards, Philip kills Randy by snapping his neck. They take the body to the car, where Philip asks Elizabeth if they should mention the events to Paige.

== Production ==
=== Development ===
In February 2017, FX confirmed that the third episode of the season would be titled "The Midges", and that it would be written by supervising producer Tracey Scott Wilson, and directed by Stefan Schwartz. This was Wilson's sixth writing credit, and Schwartz's third directing credit.

=== Filming ===
Filming for the episode started on November 7, 2016 and wrapped by November 14, 2016.

== Reception ==
=== Viewers ===
In its original American broadcast, "The Midges" was seen by an estimated 0.80 million household viewers with a 0.2 in the 18-49 demographics. This means that 0.2 percent of all households with televisions watched the episode. This was a 15% decrease in viewership from the previous episode, which was watched by 0.94 million household viewers with a 0.2 in the 18-49 demographics.

=== Critical reviews ===
"The Midges" received extremely positive reviews from critics. The review aggregator website Rotten Tomatoes reported an 100% approval rating for the episode, based on 13 reviews. The site's consensus states: "'The Midges' further complicates things for the Jennings on the domestic front, advances the season's espionage stakes, and sneaks in a beloved character's return - all before concluding in a messy burst of violence."

Eric Goldman of IGN gave the episode a "great" 8.2 out of 10 and wrote in his verdict, "It was all about the grain – and those damn midges - this week on The Americans, as we learned more about the US plot to ruin Russian food and Philip and Elizabeth had to kill another (mostly) innocent guy in the wrong place at the wrong time. Meanwhile, Paige's spy skills continue to grow – but she continues to also find them repulsive, which is a fascinating contradiction to explore. Plus, Martha! Now will she and Oleg have a chat?"

Erik Adams of The A.V. Club gave the episode a "B+" grade and wrote, "'The Midges' is a bit of a slippery episode. It's a great collection of scenes — 'great' in terms of quality and number — but it's hard to pin down the connective tissue between them. I guess it's a certain sense of dread hanging over the proceedings, whether it's Oleg listening to the incriminating cassette tape or Mischa standing by helpless as he's shaken down by a stranger who doesn't seem eager to help get him out of Yugoslavia."

Alan Sepinwall of Uproxx wrote, "This wheat story is a surprising turn of events for the series. Until now, we've been watching, and sympathizing with, characters who are on the wrong side of history, obliviously defending the interests of a government that lies to and subjugates its people. And the show works because Philip and Elizabeth are so well portrayed by the writers and actors that we can feel bad about their personal struggles even as we’re watching them do horrible things in support of the Kremlin." Anthony Breznican of Entertainment Weekly wrote, "We know this face. It is Martha, Philip's 'wife,' former secretary for the FBI counter-espionage chief. She has been relocated to Russia to save her life. But what kind of life is this? Perhaps we'll be seeing more of her again."

Mike Hale of The New York Times wrote, "As a love song, it seemed to resonate with an ever closer bond between Elizabeth and Philip, as they confront the challenge of Paige and their increasingly problematic feelings about their jobs. But taken literally, the refrain — 'more than this, there is nothing' — has an opposite meaning: What if all the killings and deceptions, and the dislocation of their lives, end up being for nothing?" Scott Tobias of Vulture gave the episode a perfect 5 star rating out of 5 and wrote, "The beauty of this discussion — and of 'The Midges,' the best episode of the season so far — is that it reinforces the series as a higher-stakes version of parenthood. All children lie and are punished for it from an early age. Sometimes they figure out how to lie and not get caught later, as they inch toward adolescence and beyond. But there always comes a time when they will learn that lying — or simply not disclosing everything, even to those closest to them — is an essential mechanism for making their way in the world."

Emily St. James of Vox wrote, "Most of the rest of these first three episodes of season five have felt like business as usual, not like the series is on the verge of closing up shop forever (which, again, it will do next year). But the appearance of Martha feels like a nod to the thought that, yes, all of those balls the series has thrown in the air over the years are going to matter, in one way or another, and there is some sort of plan for an ending. (Not that I would expect anything less.)" Ed Gonzalez of Slant Magazine wrote, "The attention to behavioral detail that goes into any given episode of The Americans is unlike that of any other series on television. All this series has to do for it to thrum with impossible tension is to linger on an exchange wherein someone might say something that in most contexts is impossibly mundane but can set them up for disaster in the presence of, say, Russian spies."

Alec Bojalad of Den of Geek gave the episode a 4.5 star rating out of 5 and wrote, "While episodes one and two of season 5 were delightful in their own expository way, 'The Midges' announces that we are right in the thick of things now." Matt Brennan of Paste gave the episode a 9.2 out of 10 and wrote, "It might be fan service — if 'The Midges' has a flaw, almost imperceptible, it's the faint sense that Martha's presence, like Philip's emphatic last line, has been shoehorned into subtler proceedings — but even if Wright's 'special appearance by' credit suggests a one-off, at least for now, the patience with which The Americans approaches even its mightiest revelations pays off in spades."
