= Oleg Stefan =

Ukrainian-born American actor

- Born: Oleg Stepanovich Shtefanko; September 7, 1959 (age 67); Chistyakovo, Ukrainian SSR, Soviet Union
- Citizenship: Soviet Union →: United States; Russia
- Occupation: Actor
- Years active: 1977–present
- Awards: Merited Artist of the Russian Federation (2020)

Oleg Stefan né Oleg Stepanovich Shtefanko (Russian: Оле́г Степа́нович Штефанко́; born September 7, 1959) is a Soviet and Russian actor who gained popularity in Russia after moving there to study acting. He later established himself as an American film actor following his emigration to the United States.

== Biography ==
Oleg Stefan was born in Chistyakovo, Donetsk Oblast, Ukrainian SSR to a Slovak father and Russian mother from Lipetsk Oblast.

He studied acting in Moscow and graduated in 1980, subsequently becoming a member of the Moscow Maly Theater. He starred in several Soviet films until the Soviet Union's collapse in 1991.

In 1992, Oleg Stefan emigrated to the United States. Since then, he has appeared in several popular television series, including Frasier and JAG. He also had a role in Robert De Niro's The Good Shepherd opposite Matt Damon.

After 2003, Oleg Stefan returned to the Russian entertainment industry, taking on leading and supporting roles in several Moscow-produced films.

In 2005, he received a nomination for the Gold Nymph Award as Best Actor at the 45th International Festival of Television Films in Monte Carlo.

== Filmography ==
Year	Title	Role	Notes
1980	Control Strip	Rudzik	
1981	Poor Masha	Kostya	
1981	Youth	Semyon Kruglov	Episode "Visit"
1981	Through the Gobi and Khingan	Vanya Sokolov	
1981	Village Story	Yevgeny	
1983	Red Bells II	Officer	
1983	Immortality Exam	Cadet	
1983	Rupture	Vikentiev	
1984	Scarecrow	episode	
1985	In Search for Captain Grant	Capt. John Mangles	TV film
1985	The Rivals	Sergei Drozdov	
1986	Believe in Love	Volodya	
1987	Aboriginal	Oleg	
1989	It	Dmitry Prokofiev	
1991	Last Bunker	Kalinichenko	
1991	Nude in a Hat	Zuyev, a journalist	
1991	Death Bay	Yura Medunov	
1992	Master of the East	Andrei	
1993	Hostages of the Devil	Sergey Ivanovich	
1996	Pacific Blue	Zigmond	TV Series
2001	Heartbreakers	Kremlin Band Leader	
2001	Megiddo: The Omega Code 2	Russian President Kachitsky	
2003	Frasier	Vladimir	TV Series
2003	According to Jim	Sasha	TV Series
2005	Space Race	Alexei Leonov	TV Series
2005	Silent Partner	The Client	
2006	Break-through	Col. Gen. Selivanov	
2006	Ultimate Force	Pyotr	Episode "Changing of the Guard"
2006	Film Festival, or Port Eisenstein	Actor Blok	
2006	Family Name	Vozdvizhensky	
2006	Moscow Mission	Martin	
2006	The Good Shepherd	Ulysses / Stas Siyanko	
2007	The Apocalypse Code	Mike Hutchins	
2009	Duplicity	Boris Fetyov	
2011-2018	Forester	Leonid Matveevich Zubov	TV Series
2016	The Americans	Anatoly Viktorovich	TV Series
2017	Chervoniy	Voron	
2019	The Bus Number 13	Janitor	
2023	Tetris	Nikolai Belikov	
