= Darya Ekamasova =

Russian actress (born 1984)

- Дарья Екамасова
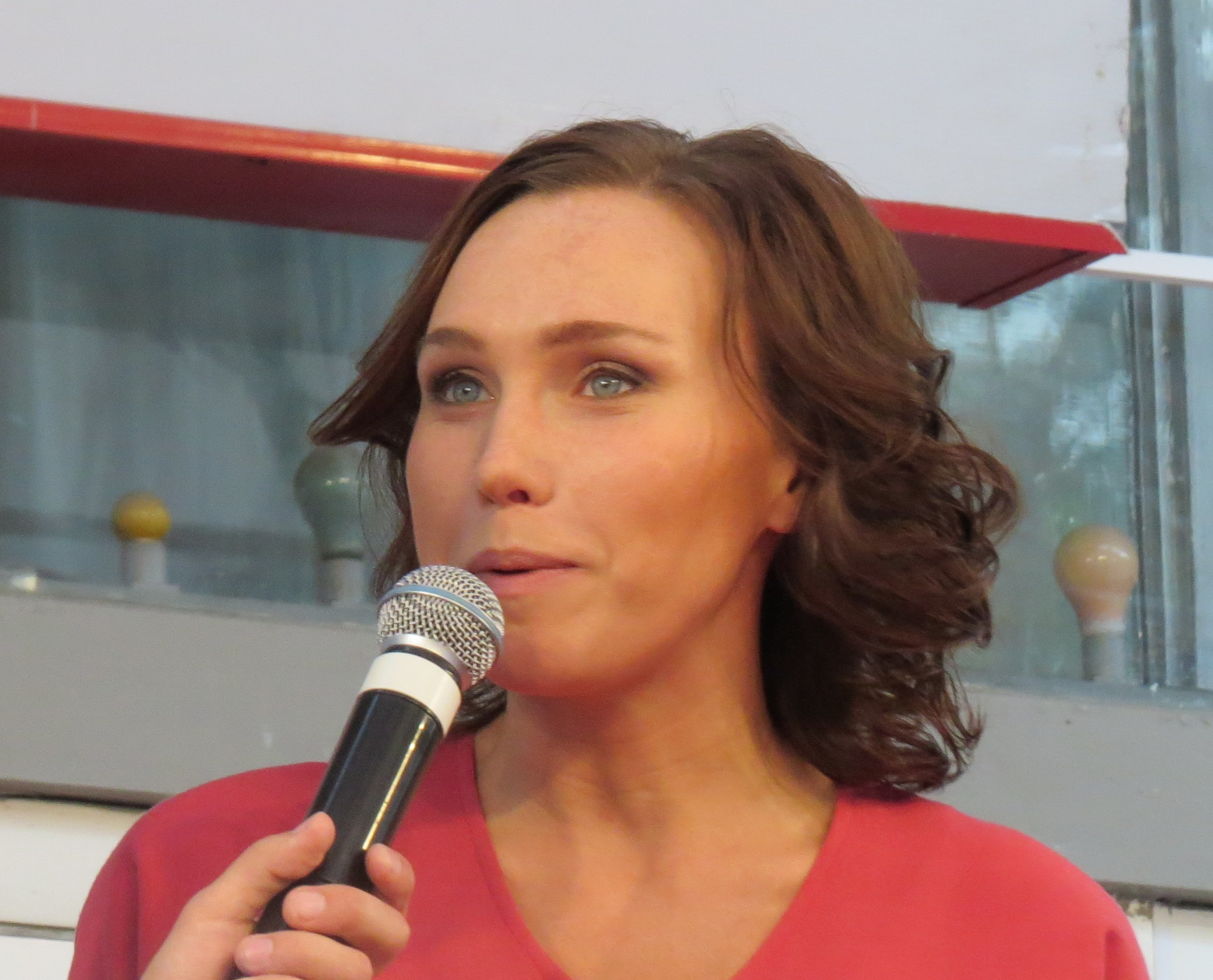
- Ekamasova in 2015
- Born: Darya Nikolaevna Ekamasova; 20 May 1984 (age 42); Moscow, RSFSR, USSR
- Occupation: Actress
- Years active: 2002—present
- Awards: Nika Award (2011)

Darya Nikolaevna Ekamasova (Russian: Дарья Николаевна Екамасова; born 20 May 1984) is a Russian theatre and film actress. Her film credits include Once Upon a Time There Lived a Simple Woman (2011), Free Floating (2006) and Celestial Wives of the Meadow Mari (2012). She was also featured in the television mini-series Kuprin. Yama (2014). In the fifth and sixth seasons of The Americans (2017-2018), she plays the role of Sofia Kovalenko. She had a supporting performance in the American film Anora (2024), directed by Sean Baker which won the Academy Award for Best Picture.

== Early life ==
Ekamasova was born in Moscow, Russian SFSR, Soviet Union. After music school she attended the Russian University of Theatre Arts (Workshop Aleksandr Porokhovshchikov).

== Theatre ==
Ekamasova made her debut in Vladimir Ageev's play "Captive Spirits" as Lyubochka Mendeleeva (Playwright and Director Center n/p A. Kazantsev and M. Roshchin). She also appeared in the plays "Life is Good", which received the Special Jury Prize Dramatic Theatre National Theatre Award "Golden Mask" in 2010; and "18th Hour".

== Filmography ==
=== Film ===
| Year | Title | Role | Ref. |
|---|---|---|---|
| 2006 | Free Floating | Piggy | |
| 2011 | Once Upon a Time There Lived a Simple Woman | Varvara | |
| 2012 | The Fourth Dimension | Valya | |
| 2012 | Celestial Wives of the Meadow Mari | Onya | |
| 2013 | Legend № 17 | Tatyana Kharlamova | |
| 2015 | The Land of Oz | Maiden | |
| 2019 | Give Me Liberty | Sasha | |
| 2020 | White Snow | Irina Makarova | |
| 2024 | Anora | Galina Zakharova | |
| 2026 | Sanding Dreams | Mother | |

=== Television ===
| Year | Title | Role | Notes | Ref. |
|---|---|---|---|---|
| 2014 | Kuprin. Yama | Nyura | Mini-Series | |
| 2017-2018 | The Americans | Sofia Kovalenko | | |
| 2017 | Demon of the Revolution | Nadezhda Krupskaya | | |
| 2021 | Survivors | Dina | | |
| 2022 | To the Lake | Lakka | | |
