= Ravil Isyanov =

Russian actor (1962–2021)

- Равиль Исьянов
- Born: Ravil Akhmedullovich Isyanov; 20 August 1962; Voskresensk, Russian SFSR, Soviet Union (now Voskresensk, Moscow Oblast, Russia)
- Died: 29 September 2021 (aged 59); Los Angeles, California, U.S.
- Education: Moscow Art SchoolMHAT (1990)
- Occupation: Actor
- Years active: 1992–2021
- Spouse: Erika Isyanov
- Military career
- Allegiance: Soviet Union
- Branch: Soviet Air Force

Ravil Isyanov (Russian: Равиль Ахмедуллович Исьянов; 20 August 1962 – 29 September 2021) was a Russian actor who appeared in over 70 films and television roles, primarily in the United States. He was best known for his role as Anatoli Kirkin on NCIS.

== Biography ==
Isyanov was born in Voskresensk on 20 August 1962, and served in the Soviet Air Force for two years. He worked for two seasons at a regional theatre in Khabarovsk, before enrolling in the MKhAT Studio-School in Moscow, under Alexander Kalyagin, graduating in 1990. He also studied three summers overseas at the British American Drama Academy's "Midsummer at Oxford" program in England. He began his professional career as an ensemble member of the Theatr Clwyd in Wales.

After the collapse of the Soviet Union, he decided to stay in Britain on his work visa, and continued working there. He made notable film appearances in the Nicolas Roeg-directed Two Deaths and the James Bond film GoldenEye, both in 1995. He had a supporting role as Cornelius in Kenneth Branagh's epic adaptation of Hamlet, released the following year.

In 1998, Isyanov moved to Los Angeles, where he lived and worked until his death. Isyanov died on 29 September 2021, at the age of 59, following a 17-month battle with cancer.

== Filmography ==
=== Film ===
Year	Title	Role	Notes
1992	Back in the USSR	Georgi	
1995	Two Deaths	Lieutenant	
1995	Hackers	Russian Hacker	
1995	GoldenEye	MiG Pilot	
1996	Hamlet	Cornelius	
1997	The Saint	Tretiak Guard	
1997	The Jackal	Ghazzi Murad	
1999	The Omega Code	Rykoff	
2000	Octopus	Casper	
2000	Doomsdayer	Viktor Dorestoy	Uncredited
2001	The Shrink Is In	Dino	
2001	Along Came a Spider	FSB Agent Lermontov	
2001	Arachnid	Henry Capri	
2002	K-19: The Widowmaker	Igor Suslov	
2003	Holes	Morris Menke	
2005	Mr. & Mrs. Smith	Curtis	
2006	The Good German	General Sikorsky	
2008	Defiance	Viktor Panchenko	
2011	Transformers: Dark of the Moon	Alexi Voskhod	
2016	Sniper: Ghost Shooter	Andrei Mashkov	
2020	No Escape	The Waiter	
2022	25 Cents Per Minute	Peter	Posthumous release
2022	Blonde	Billy Wilder	Posthumous release

=== Television ===
Year	Title	Role	Notes
1992	Stalin	Yakov Dzhugashvili	Television film
1994	EastEnders	Marku	2 episodes
1997	The Man Who Made Husbands Jealous	Boris Levitsky	
1998-1999	Seven Days	Dr. Josef Vukovitch / Political Officer Anton Kuriyov	
2000	Buffy the Vampire Slayer	Monk	Episode: "No Place Like Home"
2001	JAG	Capt. Leopold Karnik	Episode "Iron Coffin"
2001-2003	Alias	Luri Karpachev	
2005	Space Race	Valentin Glushko	
2006	24	Bierko's Technician	season 5
2006	NCIS	Robert John Stevens / Nikolai Puchenko	Season 4, Episode 4
2007	Prison Break	Wyatt	season 3
2009	Fringe season 2	Tomas	Episode "Earthling"
2009-2011	The Mentalist	Ulis Oratni / Charlie Chaplin	
2010	Bones	Dimitri Vladov	
2013	Touch	Landlord	
2013	NCIS: Los Angeles	Anatoli Kirkin	Recurring Role (2013–2021)
2013	Burn Notice	Vladimir Duboff	
2014	The Last Ship	Admiral Konstantin Nikolayevich Ruskov	
2016	Agents of S.H.I.E.L.D.	Anton Petrov	Season 3, 2 Episodes
2017	The Americans	Ruslan	
2017	Glow	Gregory, manager of the Dusty Spur motel	
