= Peter Jacobson =

American actor (born 1965)

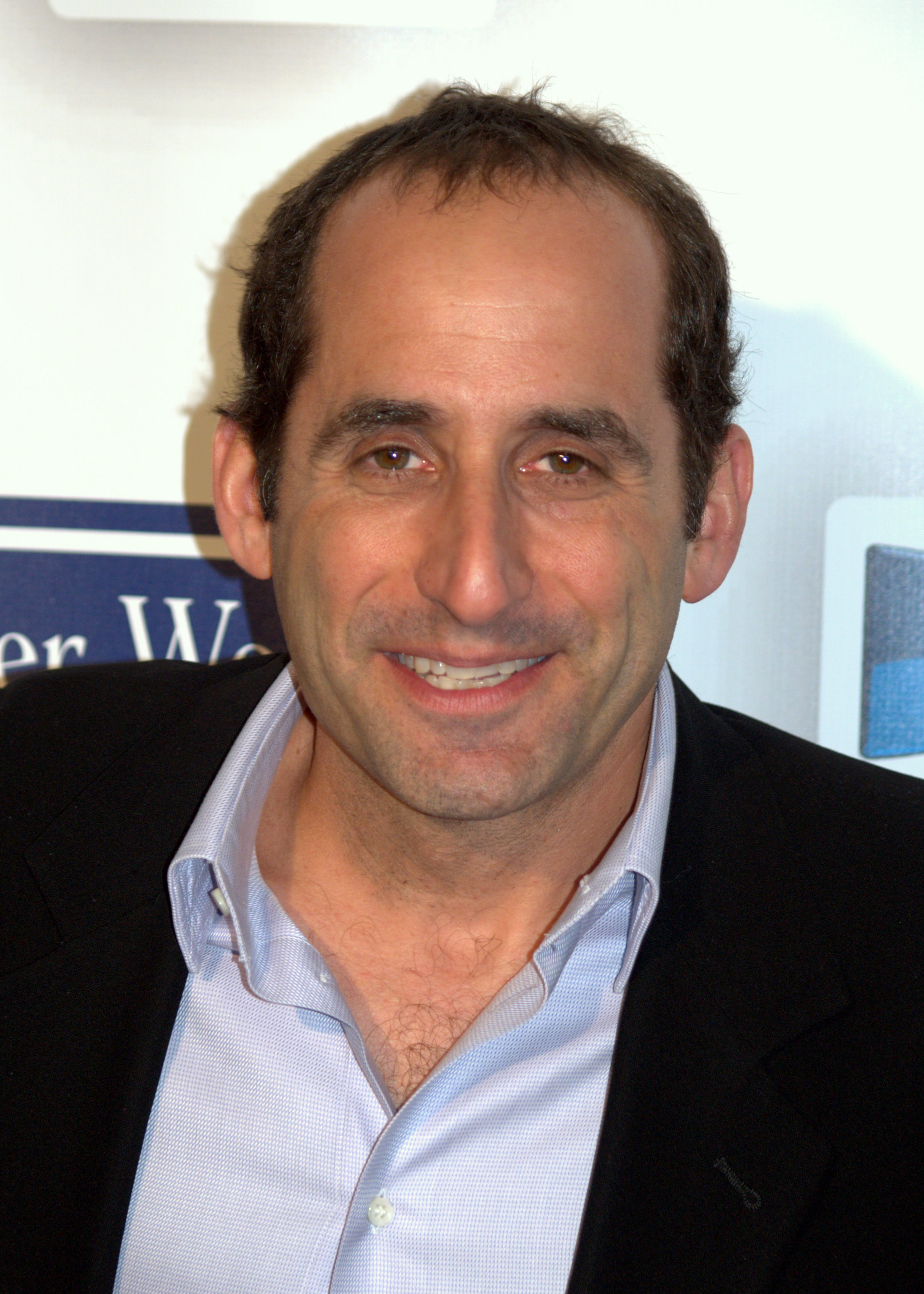
- Jacobson at the 2009 premiere of Whatever Works
- Born: March 24, 1965 (age 61); Chicago, Illinois, U.S.
- Education: Brown University (BA); Juilliard School (GrDip)
- Occupation: Actor
- Years active: 1993–present
- Known for: Chris Taub from House
- Father: Walter Jacobson

Peter Jacobson (born March 24, 1965) is an American actor. He is best known for his portrayal of Dr. Chris Taub on the Fox medical drama series House. He also starred on the USA Network science fiction drama Colony as former Proxy Snyder.

== Early life ==
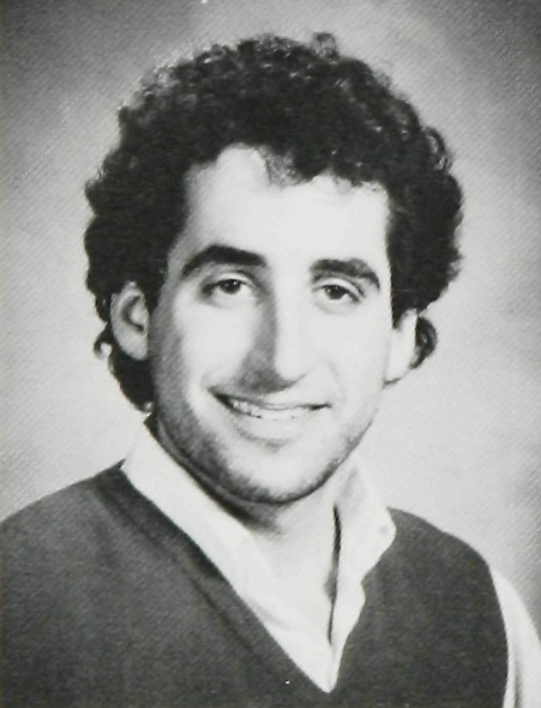
Jacobson in the Brown University yearbook, 1987

Jacobson was born in Chicago, Illinois, the son of Lynn Straus and news anchor Walter Jacobson. His family is Jewish, coming from Russia, Ukraine, and, possibly, Lithuania. He is a 1987 graduate of Brown University. Jacobson also graduated from the Juilliard School, where he was a member of the drama division's Group 20 (1987–1991).

== Career ==
Jacobson and Lisa Edelstein, his future co-star on House, appeared as a couple eating at a restaurant in the 1997 film As Good as It Gets. He appeared twice on Law & Order as Randy Dworkin, a jovial crusading defense attorney. In 2005, he played Jimmy in the Academy Award-nominated film Good Night, and Good Luck. He has appeared in Scrubs, CSI: Miami, The Lost Room, The Starter Wife, Transformers, Colony, and The Midnight Meat Train.

Jacobson joined the cast of House as Dr. Chris Taub, a plastic surgeon hoping to secure a place on Dr. Gregory House's diagnostics team. In October 2007, he was confirmed as a regular on the show. He made a guest appearance as Alan on an episode of the USA Network's Royal Pains.

== Filmography ==
=== Film ===
Year	Title	Role	Notes
1994	It Could Happen to You	Television Reporter	
1995	Jeffrey	Man #1	
1996	Ed's Next Move	Yalta Coffee Shop Owner	
1997	Private Parts	Lawyer	
1997	Commandments	Banker	
1997	Conspiracy Theory	Surveillance Operator	
1997	Deconstructing Harry	Goldberg / Harry's Character	
1997	As Good as It Gets	Man at Table	
1998	A Price Above Rubies	Schmuel	
1998	Great Expectations	Man on Phone	
1998	Mixing Nia		
1998	A Civil Action	Neil Jacobs	
1999	Hit and Runway	Elliot Springer	
1999	Cradle Will Rock	Silvano	
2000	Looking for an Echo	Marty Pearlstein	
2001	Life with David J	Michael	
2001	Roomates	Eric	
2001	61*	Artie Green	
2001	Get Well Soon	Nathan	
2002	Pipe Dream	Arnie Hufflitz	
2002	Showtime	Brad Slocum	
2002	Path to War	Adam Yarmolinsky	
2004	Strip Search	John Scanlon	
2005	Good Night, and Good Luck	Jimmy	
2005	Domino	Burke Beckett	
2006	Failure to Launch	Boatyard Man	
2006	The Passage	Jacob Schultz	
2007	The Memory Thief	Mr. Freeman	
2007	Live Free or Die Hard	Maggie Q's Partner	Uncredited
2007	Purple Violets	Monroe	Uncredited
2007	Transformers	Mr. Hosney	Cameo
2008	What Just Happened	Cal	
2008	Midnight Meat Train	Otto	
2011	Cars 2	Acer (voice)	
2013	White House Down	Wallace	
2013	Brightest Star	Dr. Lambert	
2014	Better Living Through Chemistry	Dr. Roth	
2016	Catfight	Carl	
2019	The Goldfinch	Mr. Silver	
2021	Violet	Roger Vale	
2023	Dark Highway	The Clown	
2024	Fly Me to the Moon	Chuck Meadows	
2024	Smile 2	Morris	

=== Television ===
Year	Title	Role	Notes
1993	NYPD Blue	Reporter #1	Episode: "4B or Not 4B"
1994	Law & Order	Dr. Karl Styne	Episode: "Doubles"
1997	Oz	Carlton Auerback	Episode: "Capital P"
1997	Spin City	Greg Mullins	Episode: "Porn in the U.S.A."
2000	Talk to Me	Sandy	3 episodes
2000–2001	Bull	Josh Kaplan	5 episodes
2001	Will & Grace	Paul Budnik	Episode: "Mad Dogs and Average Men"
2001	Gideon's Crossing	Josh Steinman	Episode: "The Way"
2001	Third Watch	Detective Hall	Episode: "Childhood Memories"
2003	A.U.S.A.	Geoffrey Laurence	8 episodes
2003	Ed	Jeff Foster	Episode: "Goodbye Stuckeyville"
2003–2006	Law & Order	Randolph J. "Randy" Dworkin, Esq.	3 episodes
2004	ER	Susan's molester	Episode: "The Student"
2004	Method & Red	Bill Blaford	5 episodes
2005	Hope & Faith	Aaron Melville	2 episodes
2005	CSI: Miami	George Hammett	Episode: "Payback"
2006	Love Monkey	Wapow! Guy	Episode: "Confidence"
2006	Scrubs	Mr. Foster	Episode: "My Big Bird"
2006	Criminal Minds	Michael Ryer	Episode: "Somebody's Watching"
2006	In Justice	Yarmulke Jake	5 episodes
2006	The Lost Room	Wally Jabrowski	3 episodes
2006	Entourage	Studio Head	Episode: "The Release"
2007	Boston Legal	D.A. Randy Golden	Episode: "Guantanamo by the Bay"
2007	The Starter Wife	Kenny Kagan	6 episodes
2007–2012	House	Dr. Chris Taub	96 episodes
2009–2010	Royal Pains	Alan Righter	2 episodes
2011	The Good Wife	Michael Kahane	Episode: "A New Day"
2012	Iron Chef America	Himself	Guest judge Episode: "Simon vs. Yagihashi"
2012	Law & Order: Special Victims Unit	Bart Ganzel	3 episodes
2013	It's Always Sunny in Philadelphia	Michael Rotenberg	Episode: "The Gang Broke Dee"
2013	Perception	Dr. Poole	Episode: "Asylum"
2013–2015	Ray Donovan	Lee Drexler	10 episodes
2014	Rake	Max Fawcett	Episode: "50 Shades of Gay"
2015	Chicago P.D.	Mr. Friedman	Episode: "What Puts You on That Ledge"
2015	Battle Creek	Darrel	Episode: "Cereal Killers"
2016	Madam Secretary	Ted	Episode: "The Middle Way"
2016–2017	The Americans	Agent Wolfe	Recurring role; 11 episodes
2016–2018	Colony	Proxy Alan Snyder	25 episodes
2017	Адаптация (The Adaptation)	C.I.A. Colonel Doyle Brunson	Regular
2017	Bull	Garrett Tildan	Episode: "Dirty Little Secrets"
2017	Genius	Chaim Weizmann	Episode: "Chapter Eight"
2017–2018	Law & Order: Special Victims Unit	Randy Dworkin	2 episodes
2018	Billions	Shelby Vivian	Episode: “Infinite Game”
2018–2019	NCIS: Los Angeles	John Rogers	Season 10 - Series Regular
2019–2022	Fear the Walking Dead	Rabbi Jacob Kessner	Recurring role (season 5–7, 11 episodes)
2022	WeCrashed	Bob Paltrow	2 episodes
2022	New Amsterdam	Bob Levin	Episode: "The Empty Spaces"
2022	Haul out the Holly	Albert	Hallmark Channel
2023	Haul out the Holly: Lit Up	Albert	Hallmark Channel
2023	Ahsoka	Myn Weaver	Episode: "Part Two: Toil and Trouble"
2024	The Good Doctor	Sal Zacharia	Episode: "Skin in the Game"
2024	The Girls on the Bus	Benji Newman	4 episodes
2025	FBI	Jeff Mills	Episode: "Lineage"
2025	Homestead: The Series	Father Frank Bertram	Episode: "No Straight Path"
2026	High Potential	Wayne Vincent	Episode: "Under the Rug"

=== Video games ===
Year	Title	Role	Notes
2011	Cars 2: The Video Game	Acer	
