= Irina Dvorovenko =

Ukrainian-American retired ballet dancer and actress

- Ірина Дворовенко
- Born: 28 August 1973 (age 53); Kiev, Ukrainian SSR, Soviet Union (now Kyiv, Ukraine)
- Citizenship: American
- Occupations: Ballet dancer; Actress
- Years active: 1990–2013 (dancer); 2013–present (actress)
- Spouse: Maxim Beloserkovsky
- Dancing career
- Former groups: National Opera and Ballet Theatre of Kyiv; American Ballet Theatre
- Website: IrinaMaxBallet.com

Irina Vladimirovna Dvorovenko (Note: Ukrainian: Ірина Володимирівна Дворовенко, romanized: Iryna Volodymyrivna Dvorovenko) (born August 28, 1973) is a retired ballet dancer and actress. She was a principal dancer with the American Ballet Theatre.

== Early life ==
Dvorovenko was born in Kiev, Ukrainian SSR, Soviet Union (now Kyiv, Ukraine) and is Ukrainian-American. Her parents are dancers. She started with gymnastics before entering the Kyiv Ballet School at the age of ten.

== Career ==
=== Ballet ===
In 1990, Dvorovenko joined the National Opera and Ballet Theatre of Kyiv as a soloist, and was promoted to principal dancer in 1992. When she was touring with the company, she and her colleagues decided to bring as much food back home as possible.

In 1996, Dvorovenko joined the American Ballet Theatre, and was promoted to soloist the following year. She became a principal dancer in 2000. She had danced many lead roles at the company, including Odette/Odile in Swan Lake, Aurora in The Sleeping Beauty and Kitri in Don Quixote.

In May 2013, Dvorovenko retired from ABT following a performance as Tatiana in Onegin, with Cory Stearns as the title role. She planned to perform as a guest artist.

Dvorovenko now coaches younger dancers at ABT along with her husband, Maxim Beloserkovsky. Dancers they coached include Skylar Brandt, for her debut as the title role in Giselle. She also runs a ballet intensive with Beloserkovsky.

=== Acting ===
In May 2013, she made her acting debut as Vera Baronova in the Encores! production of On Your Toes at New York City Center. Her performance received positive reviews.

In 2015, Dvorovenko starred in Starz TV series Flesh and Bone, as Kiira, an aging prima ballerina. The show was choreographed by Dvorovenko's former ABT colleague Ethan Stiefel.

In 2017, Dvorovenko appeared as a recurring character in the fifth season of The Americans. She played a Soviet émigré, Evgheniya Morozova.

In March 2018 Dvorovenko returned to Encores! as Elizaveta Grushinskaya in Grand Hotel.

She has also appeared in the television series Forever, The Blacklist and Power.

She starred in the 2026 romance thriller film Verity.

== Personal life ==
Dvorovenko is married to Maxim Beloserkovsky, a fellow ABT principal dancer. They have a daughter, Emma Galina, born in 2005. Dvorovenko is a naturalised American citizen.

== Selected repertoire ==
- Terpsichore and Polyhymnia in Apollo
- Mathilda Kchessinska and the Tsarina in Anastasia
- Nikiya and Gamzatti in La Bayadère
- The title role in Cinderella
- Swanilda in Coppélia
- Medora in Le Corsaire
- Kitri and Mercedes in Don Quixote
- Giselle, Myrtha and the peasant pas de deux in Giselle
- Hanna Glawari and Valencienne in The Merry Widow
- The Sugar Plum Fairy in The Nutcracker
- Tatiana in Onegin
- The Paquita pas de deux
- The title role in Raymonda
- Juliet in Romeo and Juliet
- The Lilac Fairy and Princess Florine in The Sleeping Beauty
- Odette-Odile in Swan Lake
- The first and second movements in Symphony in C
- The Sylvia Pas de Deux
- Tchaikovsky Pas de Deux
- Leading roles in Études
- Petite Mort
- Les Sylphides

=== Created roles ===
- The Brahms/Haydn Variations

== Awards ==
- Diploma and the Grand Prix in the Junior Division of the Ukraine Ballet Competition, 1987
- Diploma in the Junior Division of the Moscow Ballet Competition, 1988
- Silver Medal at the Jackson International Ballet Competition, 1990
- Bronze Medal at the International Ballet Competition in Osaka, Japan, 1991
- Gold Medal and the "Anna Pavlova" Prize at the International Ballet Competition in Moscow, 1992
- The Grand Prix at the International Ballet Competition Serge Lifar in the Ukraine, 1994
