= Holly Taylor =

Canadian and American actress and dancer

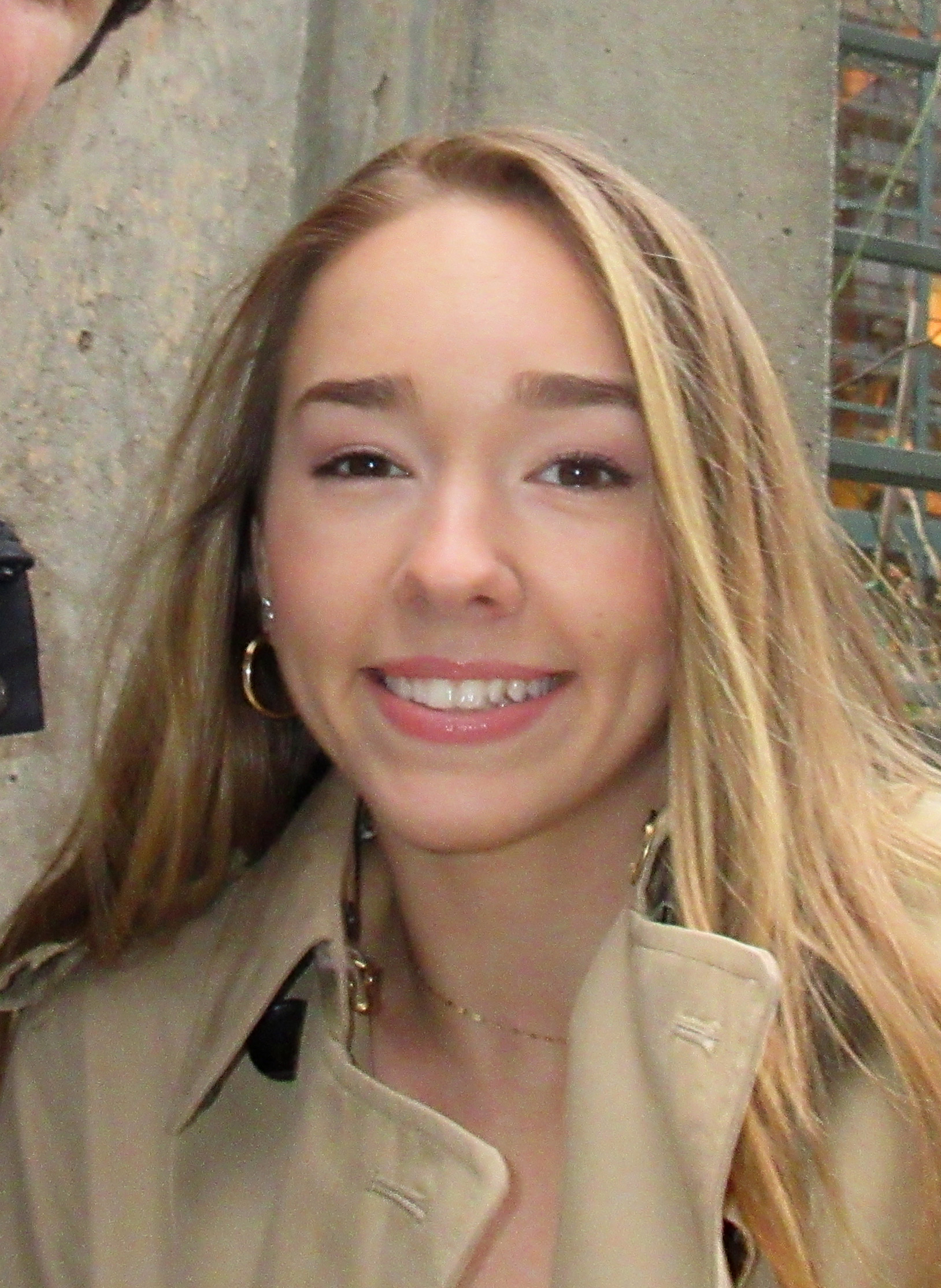
- Taylor in 2019
- Born: October 31, 1997 (age 28); Middleton, Nova Scotia, Canada
- Occupations: Actress; dancer
- Years active: 2008–present

Holly Taylor (born October 31, 1997) is a Canadian and American actress and dancer. She began her career in the Broadway production of Billy Elliot at the age of eleven as Sharon Percy (Ballet Girl) and continued in the role for almost two years. She played the role of Paige Jennings in the FX television series The Americans for its entire run, for which she received a nomination for the Critics' Choice Television Award for Best Supporting Actress in a Drama Series in 2019. In addition, she portrayed Angelina Meyer, a maniacal false prophet in the NBC/Netflix science fiction series Manifest.

== Early life and education ==
Born in Middleton, Nova Scotia, Taylor has lived in Wayne, New Jersey, since she was two years old. She graduated from Wayne Hills High School in 2016.

She studied graphic design at Kean University in Union, New Jersey and graduated in spring 2021 with Bachelor of Fine Arts.

== Career ==
By the time she was eleven years old, Taylor was dancing eight shows a week as a member of the cast of Billy Elliot at the Imperial Theatre in New York City.

Taylor attended middle school in her hometown in New Jersey as much as the Billy Elliot schedule would allow and kept up her academics. She was invited to attend the Johns Hopkins program for Gifted and Talented Children, and the following year was invited to the International Student Exchange program for Gifted Children.

Billy Elliot lasted 22 months. After that, she started looking into acting more, although she was so shy it was difficult at first. "But then, the more I started to do it, the more I came out of my shell and the more I enjoyed it", she said.

She did an audition tape for the spy thriller television series The Americans in Los Angeles and booked the show after having a chance to meet the producers in New York.

In 2021, Taylor joined the third season of Manifest as Angelina Meyer.

== Filmography ==
Film roles
Year	Title	Role	Notes
2013	Ashley	Young Ashley	
2014	Worst Friends	Little Girl	
2016	The Otherworld	Dannan	
2018	The Witch Files	Claire	
2020	We Still Say Grace	Maggie	
2021	Rogue Hostage	Mikki	

Television roles
Year	Title	Role	Notes
2010	Celebrity Nightmares Decoded	Daughter	unknown episode
2013–2018	The Americans	Paige Jennings	Main role
2018	The Good Doctor	Maddie Glassman	2 episodes
2018	Bull	Chloe Newhouse	Episode: "A Higher Law"
2019	Heartstrings	Delilah Covern	Episode: "Down from Dover"
2019	The Unsettling	Becca	Main role
2021–2023	Manifest	Angelina Meyer	Main role (seasons 3–4)

== Awards and nominations ==
Year	Association	Category	Nominated work	Result
2015	Saturn Awards	Best Performance by a Younger Actor in a Television Series	The Americans	Nominated
2015	Young Artist Awards	Best Supporting Younger Actress in a Television Series	The Americans	Won
2019	Critics' Choice Television Awards	Best Supporting Actress in a Drama Series	The Americans	Nominated
2019	Screen Actors Guild Award	Outstanding Performance by an Ensemble in a Drama Series	The Americans	Nominated
