= List of The Americans episodes =

The Americans is an American television drama series created by Joe Weisberg, which premiered on January 30, 2013, on the cable network FX. Set during the Cold War period in the 1980s, The Americans is the story of Elizabeth (Keri Russell) and Philip Jennings (Matthew Rhys), two Soviet KGB officers posing as U.S. citizens and a married couple.

The series's sixth and final season, consisting of 10 episodes, premiered on March 28, 2018. During the course of the series, 75 episodes of The Americans aired over six seasons, between January 30, 2013, and May 30, 2018.

== Series overview ==
Season	Episodes	Originally released	
Season	Episodes	First released	Last released
1	13	January 30, 2013	May 1, 2013
2	13	February 26, 2014	May 21, 2014
3	13	January 28, 2015	April 22, 2015
4	13	March 16, 2016	June 8, 2016
5	13	March 7, 2017	May 30, 2017
6	10	March 28, 2018	May 30, 2018

== Episodes ==
=== Season 1 (2013) ===
No. overall	No. in season	Title	Directed by	Written by	Original release date	Prod. code	US viewers (millions)
1	1	"Pilot"	Gavin O'Connor	Joe Weisberg	January 30, 2013	BDU179	3.22
2	2	"The Clock"	Adam Arkin	Joe Weisberg	February 6, 2013	BDU101	1.97
3	3	"Gregory"	Thomas Schlamme	Joel Fields	February 13, 2013	BDU102	1.65
4	4	"In Control"	Jean de Segonzac	Joel Fields & Joe Weisberg	February 20, 2013	BDU103	1.91
5	5	"COMINT"	Holly Dale	Melissa James Gibson	February 27, 2013	BDU104	1.44
6	6	"Trust Me"	Daniel Sackheim	Sneha Koorse	March 6, 2013	BDU105	1.88
7	7	"Duty and Honor"	Alex Chapple	Joshua Brand	March 13, 2013	BDU106	1.70
8	8	"Mutually Assured Destruction"	Bill Johnson	Joel Fields & Joe Weisberg	March 20, 2013	BDU107	1.65
9	9	"Safe House"	Jim McKay	Joshua Brand	April 3, 2013	BDU108	1.38
10	10	"Only You"	Adam Arkin	Bradford Winters	April 10, 2013	BDU109	1.50
11	11	"Covert War"	Nicole Kassell	Joshua Brand & Melissa James Gibson	April 17, 2013	BDU110	1.81
12	12	"The Oath"	John Dahl	Joshua Brand & Melissa James Gibson	April 24, 2013	BDU111	1.49
13	13	"The Colonel"	Adam Arkin	Joel Fields & Joe Weisberg	May 1, 2013	BDU112	1.74

=== Season 2 (2014) ===
No. overall	No. in season	Title	Directed by	Written by	Original release date	Prod. code	US viewers (millions)
14	1	"Comrades"	Thomas Schlamme	Joel Fields & Joe Weisberg	February 26, 2014	BDU201	1.90
15	2	"Cardinal"	Daniel Sackheim	Joel Fields & Joe Weisberg	March 5, 2014	BDU202	1.46
16	3	"The Walk In"	Constantine Makris	Stuart Zicherman	March 12, 2014	BDU203	1.27
17	4	"A Little Night Music"	Lodge Kerrigan	Stephen Schiff	March 19, 2014	BDU204	1.39
18	5	"The Deal"	Dan Attias	Angelina Burnett	March 26, 2014	BDU205	1.36
19	6	"Behind the Red Door"	Charlotte Sieling	Melissa James Gibson	April 2, 2014	BDU206	1.21
20	7	"Arpanet"	Kevin Dowling	Joshua Brand	April 9, 2014	BDU207	1.18
21	8	"New Car"	John Dahl	Peter Ackerman	April 16, 2014	BDU208	1.39
22	9	"Martial Eagle"	Alik Sakharov	Story by : Oliver North & Tracey Scott Wilson; Teleplay by : Tracey Scott Wilson	April 23, 2014	BDU209	1.37
23	10	"Yousaf"	Stefan Schwartz	Stephen Schiff & Stuart Zicherman	April 30, 2014	BDU210	1.27
24	11	"Stealth"	Gregory Hoblit	Joshua Brand	May 7, 2014	BDU211	1.12
25	12	"Operation Chronicle"	Andrew Bernstein	Joel Fields & Joe Weisberg	May 14, 2014	BDU212	1.27
26	13	"Echo"	Daniel Sackheim	Joel Fields & Joe Weisberg	May 21, 2014	BDU213	1.29

=== Season 3 (2015) ===
No. overall	No. in season	Title	Directed by	Written by	Original release date	Prod. code	US viewers (millions)
27	1	"EST Men"	Daniel Sackheim	Joel Fields & Joe Weisberg	January 28, 2015	BDU301	1.90
28	2	"Baggage"	Daniel Sackheim	Joel Fields & Joe Weisberg	February 4, 2015	BDU302	0.92
29	3	"Open House"	Thomas Schlamme	Stuart Zicherman	February 11, 2015	BDU303	1.02
30	4	"Dimebag"	Thomas Schlamme	Peter Ackerman	February 18, 2015	BDU304	0.97
31	5	"Salang Pass"	Kevin Dowling	Stephen Schiff	February 25, 2015	BDU305	0.81
32	6	"Born Again"	Kevin Dowling	Tracey Scott Wilson	March 4, 2015	BDU306	0.93
33	7	"Walter Taffet"	Noah Emmerich	Lara Shapiro	March 11, 2015	BDU307	1.22
34	8	"Divestment"	Dan Attias	Joshua Brand	March 18, 2015	BDU308	1.13
35	9	"Do Mail Robots Dream of Electric Sheep?"	Stephen Williams	Joshua Brand	March 25, 2015	BDU309	0.99
36	10	"Stingers"	Larysa Kondracki	Joel Fields & Joe Weisberg	April 1, 2015	BDU310	0.90
37	11	"One Day in the Life of Anton Baklanov"	Andrew Bernstein	Stephen Schiff & Tracey Scott Wilson	April 8, 2015	BDU311	1.04
38	12	"I Am Abassin Zadran"	Christopher Misiano	Peter Ackerman & Stuart Zicherman	April 15, 2015	BDU312	0.98
39	13	"March 8, 1983"	Daniel Sackheim	Joel Fields & Joe Weisberg	April 22, 2015	BDU313	1.22

=== Season 4 (2016) ===
No. overall	No. in season	Title	Directed by	Written by	Original release date	Prod. code	US viewers (millions)
40	1	"Glanders"	Thomas Schlamme	Joel Fields & Joe Weisberg	March 16, 2016	BDU401	1.11
41	2	"Pastor Tim"	Chris Long	Joel Fields & Joe Weisberg	March 23, 2016	BDU402	0.93
42	3	"Experimental Prototype City of Tomorrow"	Kevin Dowling	Stephen Schiff	March 30, 2016	BDU403	0.82
43	4	"Chloramphenicol"	Stefan Schwartz	Tracey Scott Wilson	April 6, 2016	BDU404	1.04
44	5	"Clark's Place"	Noah Emmerich	Peter Ackerman	April 13, 2016	BDU405	0.89
45	6	"The Rat"	Kari Skogland	Joshua Brand	April 20, 2016	BDU406	0.90
46	7	"Travel Agents"	Dan Attias	Tanya Barfield	April 27, 2016	BDU407	0.90
47	8	"The Magic of David Copperfield V: The Statue of Liberty Disappears"	Matthew Rhys	Stephen Schiff	May 4, 2016	BDU408	1.02
48	9	"The Day After"	Daniel Sackheim	Tracey Scott Wilson	May 11, 2016	BDU409	0.90
49	10	"Munchkins"	Steph Green	Peter Ackerman	May 18, 2016	BDU410	0.82
50	11	"Dinner for Seven"	Nicole Kassell	Joshua Brand	May 25, 2016	BDU411	0.81
51	12	"A Roy Rogers in Franconia"	Chris Long	Joel Fields & Joe Weisberg	June 1, 2016	BDU412	0.93
52	13	"Persona Non Grata"	Chris Long	Joel Fields & Joe Weisberg	June 8, 2016	BDU413	0.77

=== Season 5 (2017) ===
No. overall	No. in season	Title	Directed by	Written by	Original release date	Prod. code	US viewers (millions)
53	1	"Amber Waves"	Chris Long	Joel Fields & Joe Weisberg	March 7, 2017	BDU501	0.93
54	2	"Pests"	Chris Long	Joel Fields & Joe Weisberg	March 14, 2017	BDU502	0.94
55	3	"The Midges"	Stefan Schwartz	Tracey Scott Wilson	March 21, 2017	BDU503	0.80
56	4	"What's the Matter with Kansas?"	Gwyneth Horder-Payton	Peter Ackerman	March 28, 2017	BDU504	0.89
57	5	"Lotus 1-2-3"	Noah Emmerich	Joshua Brand	April 4, 2017	BDU505	0.70
58	6	"Crossbreed"	Roxann Dawson	Stephen Schiff	April 11, 2017	BDU506	0.71
59	7	"The Committee on Human Rights"	Matthew Rhys	Hilary Bettis	April 18, 2017	BDU507	0.79
60	8	"Immersion"	Kevin Bray	Tracey Scott Wilson	April 25, 2017	BDU508	0.76
61	9	"IHOP"	Dan Attias	Peter Ackerman	May 2, 2017	BDU509	0.68
62	10	"Darkroom"	Sylvain White	Stephen Schiff	May 9, 2017	BDU510	0.61
63	11	"Dyatkovo"	Steph Green	Joshua Brand	May 16, 2017	BDU511	0.62
64	12	"The World Council of Churches"	Nicole Kassell	Joel Fields & Joe Weisberg	May 23, 2017	BDU512	0.66
65	13	"The Soviet Division"	Chris Long	Joel Fields & Joe Weisberg	May 30, 2017	BDU513	0.77

=== Season 6 (2018) ===
No. overall	No. in season	Title	Directed by	Written by	Original release date	Prod. code	US viewers (millions)
66	1	"Dead Hand"	Chris Long	Joel Fields & Joe Weisberg	March 28, 2018	BDU601	0.64
67	2	"Tchaikovsky"	Matthew Rhys	Joel Fields & Joe Weisberg	April 4, 2018	BDU602	0.62
68	3	"Urban Transport Planning"	Dan Attias	Tracey Scott Wilson	April 11, 2018	BDU603	0.71
69	4	"Mr. and Mrs. Teacup"	Roxann Dawson	Peter Ackerman	April 18, 2018	BDU604	0.57
70	5	"The Great Patriotic War"	Thomas Schlamme	Hilary Bettis	April 25, 2018	BDU605	0.54
71	6	"Rififi"	Kevin Bray	Stephen Schiff & Justin Weinberger	May 2, 2018	BDU606	0.61
72	7	"Harvest"	Stefan Schwartz	Sarah Nolen	May 9, 2018	BDU607	0.67
73	8	"The Summit"	Sylvain White	Joshua Brand	May 16, 2018	BDU608	0.62
74	9	"Jennings, Elizabeth"	Chris Long	Joel Fields & Joe Weisberg	May 23, 2018	BDU609	0.73
75	10	"START"	Chris Long	Joel Fields & Joe Weisberg	May 30, 2018	BDU610	0.92

== Ratings ==
The Americans : U.S. viewers per episode (millions)

Season	Episode number													Average
Season	1	2	3	4	5	6	7	8	9	10	11	12	13	Average
1	3.22	1.97	1.65	1.91	1.44	1.88	1.70	1.65	1.38	1.50	1.81	1.49	1.74	1.80
2	1.90	1.46	1.27	1.39	1.36	1.21	1.18	1.39	1.37	1.27	1.12	1.27	1.29	1.34
3	1.90	0.92	1.02	0.97	0.81	0.93	1.22	1.13	0.99	0.90	1.04	0.98	1.22	1.08
4	1.11	0.93	0.82	1.04	0.89	0.90	0.90	1.02	0.90	0.82	0.81	0.93	0.77	0.91
5	0.93	0.94	0.80	0.89	0.70	0.71	0.79	0.76	0.68	0.61	0.62	0.66	0.77	0.76
6	0.64	0.62	0.71	0.57	0.54	0.61	0.67	0.62	0.73	0.92	–			0.66

Audience measurement performed by Nielsen Media Research
