= List of awards and nominations received by The Americans =

List of awards and nominations for The Americans
Awards and nominations
Award	Wins	Nominations
ACE Eddie Awards	0	1
AFI Awards	5	5
Artios Awards	0	4
Critics' Choice Awards	4	19
Directors Guild of America Awards	0	1
Dorian Awards	0	1
Golden Globe Awards	1	4
Golden Reel Awards	1	2
Gracie Awards	1	1
HPA Awards	0	1
Peabody Awards	2	2
People's Choice Awards	0	1
Primetime Emmy Awards	4	18
Producers Guild of America Awards	1	1
Satellite Awards	1	9
Saturn Awards	0	3
Screen Actors Guild Awards	0	1
TCA Awards	6	17
TV Guide Awards	0	1
Women's Image Awards	0	2
Writers Guild of America Awards	2	6
Young Artist Awards	1	2

Totals (Note: Certain award groups do not simply award one winner. They acknowledge several different recipients, have runners-up, and have third place. Since this is a specific recognition and is different from losing an award, runner-up mentions are considered wins in this award tally. For simplification and to avoid errors, each award in this list has been presumed to have had a prior nomination.)
- Wins: 29
- Nominations: 102

This is a list of awards and nominations for The Americans, an American period spy drama television series that debuted on FX on January 30, 2013. The series stars Keri Russell, Matthew Rhys and Noah Emmerich.

The series has been nominated for a total of 102 awards, having won 29 of those nominations.

== Awards and nominations ==
Awards and nominations received by The Americans
Award	Year (Note: The listed year refers to the date of the ceremony, not necessarily the year in which the corresponding season or episode aired)	Category	Nominee(s)	Result	Ref.
ACE Eddie Awards	2019	Best Edited Drama Series for Commercial Television	Daniel A. Valverde (for "START")	Nominated	
AFI Awards	2013	Program of the Year	The Americans	Won	
AFI Awards	2014	Program of the Year	The Americans	Won	
AFI Awards	2015	Program of the Year	The Americans	Won	
AFI Awards	2016	Program of the Year	The Americans	Won	
AFI Awards	2018	Program of the Year	The Americans	Won	
Artios Awards	2013	Outstanding Achievement in Casting – Television Pilot – Drama	Cami Patton, Christal Karge, Julie Tucker, Ross Meyerson	Nominated	
Artios Awards	2017	Outstanding Achievement in Casting – Television Series – Drama	Rori Bergman	Nominated	
Artios Awards	2018	Outstanding Achievement in Casting – Television Series – Drama	Rori Bergman	Nominated	
Artios Awards	2019	Outstanding Achievement in Casting – Television Series – Drama	Rori Bergman, Dayna Katz	Nominated	
Critics' Choice Awards	2013	Best Drama Series	The Americans	Nominated	
Critics' Choice Awards	2013	Best Actress in a Drama Series	Keri Russell	Nominated	
Critics' Choice Awards	2013	Best Actor in a Drama Series	Matthew Rhys	Nominated	
Critics' Choice Awards	2013	Best Supporting Actor in a Drama Series	Noah Emmerich	Nominated	
Critics' Choice Awards	2014	Best Drama Series	The Americans	Nominated	
Critics' Choice Awards	2014	Best Actress in a Drama Series	Keri Russell	Nominated	
Critics' Choice Awards	2014	Best Actor in a Drama Series	Matthew Rhys	Nominated	
Critics' Choice Awards	2014	Best Supporting Actress in a Drama Series	Annet Mahendru	Nominated	
Critics' Choice Awards	2015	Best Drama Series	The Americans	Won	
Critics' Choice Awards	2015	Best Actress in a Drama Series	Keri Russell	Nominated	
Critics' Choice Awards	2015	Best Actor in a Drama Series	Matthew Rhys	Nominated	
Critics' Choice Awards	2015	Best Guest Performer in a Drama Series	Lois Smith	Nominated	
Critics' Choice Awards	2016	Best Actress in a Drama Series	Keri Russell	Nominated	
Critics' Choice Awards	2016	Best Actor in a Drama Series	Matthew Rhys	Nominated	
Critics' Choice Awards	2019	Best Drama Series	The Americans	Won	
Critics' Choice Awards	2019	Best Actress in a Drama Series	Keri Russell	Nominated	
Critics' Choice Awards	2019	Best Actor in a Drama Series	Matthew Rhys	Won	
Critics' Choice Awards	2019	Best Supporting Actor in a Drama Series	Noah Emmerich	Won	
Critics' Choice Awards	2019	Best Supporting Actress in a Drama Series	Holly Taylor	Nominated	
Directors Guild of America Awards	2019	Outstanding Directorial Achievement in Dramatic Series	Chris Long (Note: Additional nominees: Tyson Bidner (unit production manager); Michelle Regina Iacobelli (first assistant director); Dave Fischer (second assistant director); Jakub Porembski (second second assistant director); Charlie Foster (assistant unit production manager); Michael Fucci (location manager)) (for "START")	Nominated	
Dorian Awards	2019	TV Performance of the Year – Actor	Matthew Rhys	Nominated	
Golden Globe Awards	2017	Best Performance by an Actress in a Television Series – Drama	Keri Russell	Nominated	
Golden Globe Awards	2017	Best Performance by an Actor in a Television Series – Drama	Matthew Rhys	Nominated	
Golden Globe Awards	2019	Best Television Series – Drama	The Americans	Won	
Golden Globe Awards	2019	Best Performance by an Actress in a Television Series – Drama	Keri Russell	Nominated	
Golden Globe Awards	2019	Best Performance by an Actor in a Television Series – Drama	Matthew Rhys	Nominated	
Golden Reel Awards	2019	Outstanding Achievement in Sound Editing – Dialogue and ADR for Episodic Short Form Broadcast Media	Ken Hahn, Neil Cedar, Gerald Donlan, John Bowen (for "Harvest")	Won	
Golden Reel Awards	2019	Outstanding Achievement in Sound Editing – Music Score and Musical for Episodic Short Form Broadcast Media	Tass Filipos (for "Harvest")	Nominated	
Gracie Awards	2015	Outstanding Female Actor in a Featured or Guest Role	Margo Martindale	Won	
HPA Awards	2013	Outstanding Sound – Television	Ken Hahn, Neil Cedar, James David Redding III (for "Mutually Assured Destruction")	Nominated	
Peabody Awards	2014	Entertainment	Fox Television Studios and FX Productions	Honored	
Peabody Awards	2018	Entertainment	Fox Television Studios and FX Productions	Honored	
People's Choice Awards	2017	Favorite Cable TV Drama	The Americans	Nominated	
Primetime Emmy Awards	2015	Outstanding Writing for a Drama Series	Joshua Brand (for "Do Mail Robots Dream of Electric Sheep?")	Nominated	
Primetime Emmy Awards	2016	Outstanding Drama Series	The Americans (Note: Nominees: Joe Weisberg, Joel Fields, Graham Yost, Darryl Frank, Justin Falvey, Chris Long, Stephen Schiff, Mary Rae Thewlis, Joshua Brand)	Nominated	
Primetime Emmy Awards	2016	Outstanding Lead Actress in a Drama Series	Keri Russell (for "The Magic of David Copperfield V: The Statue of Liberty Disappears")	Nominated	
Primetime Emmy Awards	2016	Outstanding Lead Actor in a Drama Series	Matthew Rhys (for "The Magic of David Copperfield V: The Statue of Liberty Disappears")	Nominated	
Primetime Emmy Awards	2016	Outstanding Writing for a Drama Series	Joel Fields, Joe Weisberg (for "Persona Non Grata")	Nominated	
Primetime Emmy Awards	2017	Outstanding Lead Actress in a Drama Series	Keri Russell (for "Dyatkovo")	Nominated	
Primetime Emmy Awards	2017	Outstanding Lead Actor in a Drama Series	Matthew Rhys (for "Crossbreed")	Nominated	
Primetime Emmy Awards	2017	Outstanding Writing for a Drama Series	Joel Fields, Joe Weisberg (for "The Soviet Division")	Nominated	
Primetime Emmy Awards	2018	Outstanding Drama Series	The Americans (Note: Nominees: Joe Weisberg, Joel Fields, Chris Long, Graham Yost, Justin Falvey, Darryl Frank, Stephen Schiff, Mary Rae Thewlis, Tracey Scott Wilson, Peter Ackerman, Joshua Brand)	Nominated	
Primetime Emmy Awards	2018	Outstanding Lead Actress in a Drama Series	Keri Russell (for "The Summit")	Nominated	
Primetime Emmy Awards	2018	Outstanding Lead Actor in a Drama Series	Matthew Rhys (for "START")	Won	
Primetime Emmy Awards	2018	Outstanding Writing for a Drama Series	Joel Fields, Joe Weisberg (for "START")	Won	
Primetime Creative Arts Emmy Awards	2013	Outstanding Guest Actress in a Drama Series	Margo Martindale (for "The Colonel")	Nominated	
Primetime Creative Arts Emmy Awards	2013	Outstanding Original Main Title Theme Music	Nathan Barr	Nominated	
Primetime Creative Arts Emmy Awards	2014	Outstanding Guest Actress in a Drama Series	Margo Martindale (for "Behind the Red Door")	Nominated	
Primetime Creative Arts Emmy Awards	2015	Outstanding Guest Actress in a Drama Series	Margo Martindale (for "I Am Abassin Zadran")	Won	
Primetime Creative Arts Emmy Awards	2016	Outstanding Guest Actress in a Drama Series	Margo Martindale (for "The Magic of David Copperfield V: The Statue of Liberty Disappears")	Won	
Primetime Creative Arts Emmy Awards	2017	Outstanding Guest Actress in a Drama Series	Alison Wright (for "The Soviet Division")	Nominated	
Producers Guild of America Awards	2018	Outstanding Producer of Episodic Television, Drama	Joe Weisberg, Joel Fields, Chris Long, Graham Yost, Justin Falvey, Darryl Frank, Stephen Schiff, Mary Rae Thewlis, Tracey Scott Wilson, Peter Ackerman, Joshua Brand	Won	
Satellite Awards	2014	Best Television Series, Drama	The Americans	Nominated	
Satellite Awards	2014	Best Actress in a Series, Drama	Keri Russell	Nominated	
Satellite Awards	2014	Best Actress in a Supporting Role in a Series, Miniseries or Motion Picture Made for Television	Margo Martindale	Nominated	
Satellite Awards	2015	Best Actress in a Series, Drama	Keri Russell	Won	
Satellite Awards	2017	Best Television Series, Drama	The Americans	Nominated	
Satellite Awards	2017	Best Actor in a Series, Drama	Matthew Rhys	Nominated	
Satellite Awards	2017	Best Actress in a Supporting Role in a Series, Miniseries or Motion Picture Made for Television	Alison Wright	Nominated	
Satellite Awards	2018	Best Actress in a Series, Drama	Keri Russell	Nominated	
Satellite Awards	2018	Best Actor in a Series, Drama	Matthew Rhys	Nominated	
Saturn Awards	2014	Best Syndicated/Cable Television Series	The Americans	Nominated	
Saturn Awards	2014	Best Actress in a Television Series	Keri Russell	Nominated	
Saturn Awards	2015	Best Performance by a Younger Actor in a Television Series	Holly Taylor	Nominated	
Screen Actors Guild Awards	2019	Outstanding Performance by an Ensemble in a Drama Series	Anthony Arkin, Scott Cohen, Brandon J. Dirden, Noah Emmerich, Laurie Holden, Margo Martindale, Matthew Rhys, Costa Ronin, Keri Russell, Keidrich Sellati, Miriam Shor, Holly Taylor	Nominated	
TCA Awards	2013	Program of the Year	The Americans	Nominated	
TCA Awards	2013	Outstanding New Program	The Americans	Won	
TCA Awards	2013	Outstanding Achievement in Drama	The Americans	Nominated	
TCA Awards	2013	Individual Achievement in Drama	Matthew Rhys	Nominated	
TCA Awards	2014	Outstanding Achievement in Drama	The Americans	Nominated	
TCA Awards	2014	Individual Achievement in Drama	Matthew Rhys	Nominated	
TCA Awards	2015	Program of the Year	The Americans	Nominated	
TCA Awards	2015	Outstanding Achievement in Drama	The Americans	Won	
TCA Awards	2015	Individual Achievement in Drama	Matthew Rhys	Nominated	
TCA Awards	2016	Program of the Year	The Americans	Nominated	
TCA Awards	2016	Outstanding Achievement in Drama	The Americans	Won	
TCA Awards	2016	Individual Achievement in Drama	Keri Russell	Nominated	
TCA Awards	2017	Outstanding Achievement in Drama	The Americans	Nominated	
TCA Awards	2018	Program of the Year	The Americans	Won	
TCA Awards	2018	Outstanding Achievement in Drama	The Americans	Won	
TCA Awards	2018	Individual Achievement in Drama	Keri Russell	Won	
TCA Awards	2018	Individual Achievement in Drama	Matthew Rhys	Nominated	
TV Guide Awards	2013	Favorite New Series	The Americans	Nominated	
Women's Image Awards	2013	Actress Drama Series	Keri Russell	Nominated	
Women's Image Awards	2016	Drama Series	The Americans (Note: The Americans was nominated for the episode "Persona Non Grata")	Nominated	
Writers Guild of America Awards	2014	Television: New Series	Michael Batistick, Joshua Brand, Joel Fields, Melissa James Gibson, Sneha Koorse, Joe Weisberg, Bradford Winters	Nominated	
Writers Guild of America Awards	2016	Television: Dramatic Series	Peter Ackerman, Joshua Brand, Joel Fields, Stephen Schiff, Lara Shapiro, Joe Weisberg, Tracey Scott Wilson, Stuart Zicherman	Nominated	
Writers Guild of America Awards	2017	Television: Dramatic Series	Peter Ackerman, Tanya Barfield, Joshua Brand, Joel Fields, Stephen Schiff, Joe Weisberg, Tracey Scott Wilson	Won	
Writers Guild of America Awards	2018	Television: Dramatic Series	Peter Ackerman, Hilary Bettis, Joshua Brand, Joel Fields, Stephen Schiff, Joe Weisberg, Tracey Scott Wilson	Nominated	
Writers Guild of America Awards	2018	Television: Episodic Drama	Joel Fields, Joe Weisberg (for "The Soviet Division")	Nominated	
Writers Guild of America Awards	2019	Television: Dramatic Series	Peter Ackerman, Hilary Bettis, Joshua Brand, Joel Fields, Sarah Nolen, Stephen Schiff, Justin Weinberger, Joe Weisberg, Tracey Scott Wilson	Won	
Young Artist Awards	2015	Best Performance in a TV Series – Supporting Young Actor	Keidrich Sellati	Nominated	
Young Artist Awards	2015	Best Performance in a TV Series – Supporting Young Actress	Holly Taylor	Won	
