= The Americans season 6 =

Season of television series

The Americans
- Season 6
- Promotional poster
- No. of episodes: 10

Release
- Original network: FX
- Original release: March 28 – May 30, 2018

Season chronology
- ← Previous; Season 5

The sixth and final season of the American television drama series The Americans, comprising 10 episodes, premiered on FX on March 28, 2018, The final season was announced in May 2016, when the series received a two-season renewal to conclude the series. The series moved back to its original time slot, Wednesdays at 10:00 pm, after airing on Tuesdays the previous season.

The events of the sixth season begin in late September 1987, three years after the conclusion of season five. The work of American artist Alyssa Monks was used as the artwork of Miriam Shor's character Erica Haskard, including a small number of pieces created just for the series.

The final season received critical acclaim and it was named one of the best television series of 2018 by several publications. It won several awards, including the Golden Globe Award for Best Television Series – Drama, the Critics' Choice Television Award for Best Drama Series, the TCA Award for Outstanding Achievement in Drama, and the Writers Guild of America Award for Television: Dramatic Series.

== Cast ==
=== Main ===
- Keri Russell as Elizabeth Jennings, a KGB officer
- Matthew Rhys as Philip Jennings, a retired KGB officer
- Brandon J. Dirden as FBI agent Dennis Aderholt
- Costa Ronin as Oleg Igorevich Burov, a former KGB officer, now at the Soviet transport ministry
- Keidrich Sellati as Henry Jennings, Elizabeth and Philip's son
- Holly Taylor as Paige Jennings, Elizabeth and Philip's daughter
- Margo Martindale as Claudia, Elizabeth's KGB handler
- Noah Emmerich as FBI agent Stan Beeman

=== Recurring ===
- Lev Gorn as Arkady Ivanovich Zotov, Directorate S deputy chief
- Laurie Holden as Renee, Stan's wife
- Scott Cohen as Glenn Haskard, a member of a State Department negotiating team
- Miriam Shor as Erica Haskard, an artist and Glenn's bedridden and dying wife
- Alex Feldman as Fyodor Nesterenko, a member of a Soviet negotiating team
- Julia Garner as Kimberly "Kimmy" Breland, daughter of the head of the CIA's Soviet desk
- Amy Tribbey as Marilyn, a KGB agent who works with Elizabeth
- Darya Ekamasova as Sofia Kovalenko Bystrova, a TASS employee
- Yuri Kolokolnikov as Gennadi Bystrov, a Soviet courier and Sofia's husband
- Vera Cherny as Tatiana Evgenyevna Vyazemtseva, a KGB officer working at the Rezidentura
- Kelly AuCoin as Pastor Tim, Paige's former minister, now with the World Council of Churches
- Peter Jacobson as Agent Wolfe, former head of FBI counterintelligence
- Konstantin Lavysh as Father Andrei, a Russian Orthodox priest

=== Special appearance by ===
- Derek Luke as Gregory Thomas, an American militant and Elizabeth's ex-lover, who appears in a dream Elizabeth has in the series finale.

== Episodes ==
No. overall	No. in season	Title	Directed by	Written by	Original release date	Prod. code	US viewers (millions)
66	1	"Dead Hand"	Chris Long	Joel Fields & Joe Weisberg	March 28, 2018	BDU601	0.64
In 1987, Philip has become a full-time travel agent, Henry has become a promising hockey player at boarding school, and Paige is now in college and is a Soviet agent-in-training. Stan has married Renee and has moved out of counterintelligence except for Sofia and Gennadi, whom he still handles with Dennis. Elizabeth is exhausted and resentful from her KGB case load nine weeks before the Reagan–Gorbachev summit. On orders from Claudia, Elizabeth meets with a Soviet general in Mexico who tells her about "Dead Hand" (a doomsday device) and the Soviet military's plan to overthrow Gorbachev if he or his representative Nesterenko renounces it. He gives her a cyanide pill to take if captured. Arkady, now deputy chief of Directorate S and a Gorbachev supporter, recruits Oleg, now married and out of the KGB, to travel to the US and ask Philip to uncover (and possibly stop) Elizabeth's unapproved new mission. While Paige is on a surveillance detail, a young US security officer tries to coerce her for a date by taking her (fake) ID. Elizabeth kills him to recover the ID. When Philip tries to tell Elizabeth about Oleg's visit, she rudely dismisses him.
67	2	"Tchaikovsky"	Matthew Rhys	Joel Fields & Joe Weisberg	April 4, 2018	BDU602	0.62
Stan gets a message that Gennadi wants to meet with him; he learns that Sofia has kicked Gennadi out, but Gennadi still makes a Soviet courier run with an FBI team covertly X-raying his diplomatic pouch. Dennis also tells Stan that Oleg Burov is in D.C., registered for a class on urban transport planning. Elizabeth meets with CIA contact Patrick McCleesh to gather information before the summit and has to sneak into the State Department (where she claimed to be employed) to have lunch with him. He discloses Ronald Reagan's onset of Alzheimer's. For Dead Hand, Elizabeth pressures General (formerly Colonel) Rennhull to hand over a lithium-based radiation sensor made by Altheon by threatening to expose his prior contact with the Soviets. After a Soviet lesson on Tchaikovsky from Claudia, Paige asks Elizabeth if the Soviets ever use sex to get information, which Elizabeth at first denies outright but then hedges. When Elizabeth meets Rennhull to get the sensor, he instead pulls a gun on her. When she jumps him, he fatally shoots himself through the jaw, splattering blood and brains over her face just as Paige breaks lookout cover and runs to her mother's aid.
68	3	"Urban Transport Planning"	Dan Attias	Tracey Scott Wilson	April 11, 2018	BDU603	0.71
Elizabeth berates Paige for leaving her position during the Rennhull fiasco. After Paige leaves, Elizabeth tells Philip some of the details of her mission. Sofia tells Stan that she discussed meeting with the FBI with a friend at TASS, and Stan discusses the danger with Dennis. Philip negotiates an extension on Henry's tuition payment and exhorts the travel agency to sell more. Elizabeth tells Paige that she is not afraid to die for her job. Stan awkwardly meets with Oleg, who brings up Nina. Claudia, Elizabeth, and Paige cook zharkoye, a Russian stew, and Claudia gives Elizabeth a new target for acquiring the Altheon sensor. After Elizabeth brings a sample of the zharkoye home, she and Philip discuss their very different views of the changes in Russia and her hatred of America. Stan and the FBI pick up Gennadi, Sofia, and her son Ilya to give them political asylum. Elizabeth meets with a warehousing supervisor at the Altheon plant to find weaknesses in security and then kills him when she realizes her cover will be exposed by his girlfriend. Philip meets Oleg again.
69	4	"Mr. and Mrs. Teacup"	Roxann Dawson	Peter Ackerman	April 18, 2018	BDU604	0.57
Oleg tells Philip about the split over Gorbachev within the Center. Elizabeth tries to steal a radiation sensor from the Altheon warehouse, but has to shoot three security guards just to escape without it. Philip tries to bring up Rennhull with Paige, but Elizabeth cuts him off. Paige suggests sleeping with a Congressional intern named Brian to get information. While picking up a tape of Kimmy's father, Philip learns that she is going to Greece for Thanksgiving and will not be home again before the summit. On the tape, the Americans mention a source inside the Soviets. Claudia tells Elizabeth about Gennadi's defection; Elizabeth assigns Marilyn to tail Stan and locate Gennadi. Philip tells a deflated Henry that they might not be able to afford his tuition next year and tells Elizabeth about the travel agency's financial problems. He also discusses with Stan (at a bar) why Americans always want more. Dennis tells Stan that both Gennadi and Sofia have asked to meet with him. Elizabeth convinces Erica to go to a World Series viewing party with Glenn because Nesterenko will be there, but Erica becomes ill shortly after arriving, and Elizabeth picks up no information. Paige sleeps with Brian.
70	5	"The Great Patriotic War"	Thomas Schlamme	Hilary Bettis	April 25, 2018	BDU605	0.54
Marilyn and Norm locate both Gennadi and Sofia by following Stan. Using Elizabeth's team's pictures, Claudia identifies a CIA officer meeting with Nesterenko. Elizabeth asks Philip to go to Greece with Kimmy and take her to Bulgaria, where she will be kidnapped to blackmail her father. Paige beats up two college boys who grab her. Philip visits Kimmy and sleeps with her to ensure she invites him to Greece. Tatiana locates Oleg at class and blames him for William's capture in 1984, which stalled her career. She then notifies the Center that Oleg is not loyal. Elizabeth admits to Philip that Paige may not be cut out for spying. Philip visits Paige's apartment to discuss the bar fight; when Paige tells him that she likes spying, he challenges her to spar and gets her in a chokehold she cannot break. Elizabeth breaks into Gennadi's and kills him and Sofia, leaving 7-year-old Ilya alive. A crushed Stan tells Philip about the double murder and the orphaned child. After he leaves, Philip calls Kimmy to cancel his trip and break up with her, and then tells her not to visit a communist country while in Europe.
71	6	"Rififi"	Kevin Bray	Stephen Schiff & Justin Weinberger	May 2, 2018	BDU606	0.61
Philip tells Elizabeth that he sabotaged the Kimmy kidnapping. Dennis tells Stan that one of Gennadi's pouches contained a chip from Altheon in Chicago, which (because of the D.C. killings related to Altheon) led the FBI to a Russian illegal code-named "Harvest", whom the FBI currently have under surveillance. Dennis convinces Stan to lead an effort to run down leads in D.C. based on the tradecraft learned from the surveillance of "Harvest". Henry comes home for Thanksgiving and sees the distance between his parents. Following Paige's idea, Elizabeth meets a congressional intern. Philip lays off three of his travel agents. Claudia sends Elizabeth and Marilyn to Chicago to extricate "Harvest", who was also working on Dead Hand, causing Elizabeth to miss Thanksgiving dinner at Stan's. Philip reviews Elizabeth's secret records and dead drops a coded message to Oleg, which Oleg retrieves. Elizabeth and Marilyn agree that their chances of success are poor. Elizabeth calls Henry, which Philip interprets as a possible "last call". Philip calls Elizabeth and asks her to abort the mission; when she refuses, he tells her he is coming to Chicago.
72	7	"Harvest"	Stefan Schwartz	Sarah Nolen	May 9, 2018	BDU607	0.67
Philip asks Stan to look after Henry while he is out of town. Stan questions his state of mind and Philip tells Stan that the travel agency is failing. Henry tells Stan he has never met any member of either parent's family, although Paige has. Phillip and Elizabeth manage to separate the Russian deep-cover agent codenamed "Harvest" from FBI surveillance. However, the FBI quickly picks them up again. While fleeing Marilyn and two FBI agents are killed and Harvest is grievously wounded. Harvest gives Philip messages for his parents, tells Philip that the Altheon sensor schematic is in France, and then swallows his cyanide capsule. Philip uses an axe to remove Marilyn's head and hands, and Elizabeth disposes of them. Dennis is crushed by the death of the two agents. Wondering about Philip and Elizabeth's absence during Thanksgiving weekend, Stan searches the Jennings' house but finds nothing. A photo triggers Stan to recall William's description of a spy couple with two children. Erica continues to tutor Elizabeth in drawing. Elizabeth tells Paige about Marilyn's death. Elizabeth tells Paige that if she is ready to commit to spying then it is time to apply for an internship with the State Department.
73	8	"The Summit"	Sylvain White	Joshua Brand	May 16, 2018	BDU608	0.62
Philip tells a furious Elizabeth that she has been working for a cabal trying to overthrow Gorbachev and that he has been spying on her. Gorbachev arrives in the US. After Glenn's attempt to kill Erica by overdose failed, Elizabeth kills her by suffocation. To tape Nesterenko's solo meeting with American negotiators, Elizabeth seduces the congressional intern and has him unwittingly plant a bug inside a box of documents. Renee gets a job interview at the FBI. Stan takes a picture of Elizabeth to one of Gregory's people, who does not recognize her but remembers that the woman smoked constantly. When Elizabeth has the intern bring her the box, he challenges her story and reveals the bug, but Elizabeth allows him to leave. On the tape, Elizabeth hears Nesterenko discuss Gorbachev's vision of a nuclear-free world. Claudia orders Elizabeth to kill Nesterenko, but she does not and demands an explanation. Claudia admits to being part of a Center plot to overthrow Gorbachev. Returning home, Elizabeth tells Philip to contact Oleg to confirm the overthrow plot and also asks Philip meet Father Andrei tomorrow.
74	9	"Jennings, Elizabeth"	Chris Long	Joel Fields & Joe Weisberg	May 23, 2018	BDU609	0.73
Philip leaves a dead drop for Oleg with Elizabeth's message. Stan continues to investigate the Jennings, including calling Pastor Tim in Buenos Aires and telling Dennis about his suspicions. Father Victor tells the FBI that he believes Father Andrei is affiliated with the KGB. After Oleg picks up the dead drop, the FBI arrests him for spying. Elizabeth kills Tatiana, who was sent as her replacement to assassinate Nesterenko. In FBI custody, Oleg tells Stan that he was in the US to protect Gorbachev and that Stan needs to send the encoded dead drop message to the USSR. Philip barely evades capture by two FBI agents tailing Father Andrei. Elizabeth notifies Claudia that she foiled the murder; Claudia expresses her indignation. Paige confronts Elizabeth about Brian's story of a Sam Nunn intern having been seduced by an older woman for information. Despite Elizabeth's denials, Paige disgustedly calls Elizabeth a whore and leaves. Philip calls Elizabeth with an escape signal. Elizabeth cleans out the hidden basement compartments and flees.
75	10	"START"	Chris Long	Joel Fields & Joe Weisberg	May 30, 2018	BDU610	0.92
Philip and Elizabeth agree to take Paige to the USSR but leave Henry at boarding school. Stan attempts to locate Philip, eventually staking out Paige's apartment. Father Andrei breaks down under questioning. When Philip and Elizabeth pick up Paige, Stan confronts them at gunpoint in the parking garage. After initial denials, Philip admits they are Soviet agents. Paige says her parents revealed this to her when she was 16 but never to Henry. Philip tells Stan that they are working to protect Gorbachev from a coup and that message has to get back to benefit both countries. Paige and Philip ask Stan to look after Henry. Philip tells Stan his suspicions about Renee. Stan lets them leave. Dennis shows Stan drawings that confirm the illegals are Philip and Elizabeth. The Jennings adopt their travel disguises and board a train to Montreal. Paige unexpectedly disembarks and stays behind at the US border. Stan drives to St. Edwards to tell Henry. Philip and Elizabeth make their way to the USSR. They are greeted by Arkady who brings them to Moscow. While overlooking Moscow Philip and Elizabeth reflect upon events and their life choices.

== Reception ==
=== Critical response ===
The sixth season has received widespread acclaim from critics. On Rotten Tomatoes, it received a 99% approval rating with an average score of 9.17/10 based on 30 reviews, with a critics consensus of: "The Americans' powerful final season pumps up the volume on an already intense show, concluding the complex series arc with epic familial conflict... and a high body count." On Metacritic, the season has a score of 92 out of 100 based on 18 reviews, indicating "universal acclaim".

Daniel D'Addario of Time wrote of the season: "Happily, the show has evolved in how it deals with its central concerns. [...] Even at its less-well-loved moments, The Americans is still better than practically anything else around." Tim Goodman for The Hollywood Reporter shared similar praise, writing of the final episodes: "They were, all three [episodes] of them, exceptional—clear examples of one of television's greatest dramas still very much on top of its game."

=== Accolades ===
At the 70th Primetime Emmy Awards, it won two awards and was nominated for another two. Matthew Rhys won for Outstanding Lead Actor in a Drama Series and Joel Fields and Joe Weisberg won for Outstanding Writing for a Drama Series for the episode "START". It received a nomination for Outstanding Drama Series and Keri Russell was nominated for Outstanding Lead Actress in a Drama Series.

For the 34th TCA Awards, The Americans won for Program of the Year and Outstanding Achievement in Drama, with Russell winning for Individual Achievement in Drama, and Rhys receiving a nomination in that same category. The Americans was named one of the top 10 television programs of the year by the American Film Institute. For the 76th Golden Globe Awards, The Americans won for Best Television Series – Drama, and Rhys and Russell received nominations for Best Actor and Best Actress in a television series drama, respectively.

For the 9th Critics' Choice Television Awards, The Americans won for Best Drama Series, Rhys won for Best Actor in a Drama Series and Noah Emmerich won for Best Supporting Actor in a Drama Series; Russell was nominated for Best Actress in a Drama Series and Holly Taylor was nominated for Best Supporting Actress in a Drama Series. The Americans is nominated for Best Drama Series for the 71st Writers Guild of America Awards.

The series won the Writers Guild of America Award for Television: Dramatic Series at the 71st Writers Guild of America Awards.
