= Elizabeth Jennings =

Elizabeth Jennings may refer:

- Elizabeth Jennings (poet) (1926–2001), English poet
- Elizabeth Jennings Graham (1827–1901), African-American teacher
- Jean Bartik (1924–2011), American ENIAC computer programmer who may also be known as Elizabeth Jean Jennings
- Elizabeth Jennings (The Americans), fictional character from the TV show The Americans
- "Jennings, Elizabeth", an episode of The Americans
