= The Patient =

2022 American psychological thriller limited series

- Genre: Drama; Psychological thriller
- Created by: Joel Fields & Joe Weisberg
- Showrunners: Joel Fields & Joe Weisberg
- Written by: Joel Fields & Joe Weisberg
- Starring: Steve Carell; Domhnall Gleeson; Linda Emond
- Composers: Nathan Barr; Justin Burnett
- Country of origin: United States
- Original language: English
- No. of episodes: 10

Production
- Executive producers: Joel Fields; Joe Weisberg; Chris Long; Caroline Moore; Victor Hsu; Steve Carell
- Producer: Michael Maccarone
- Cinematography: Dan Stoloff; Moira Del Pilar Morel
- Editors: Amanda Pollack; Daniel Valverde; Kate Sanford
- Running time: 21–46 minutes
- Production companies: The JS; Scallie Filmworks, Inc; FXP

Original release
- Network: FX on Hulu
- Release: August 30 – October 25, 2022

The Patient is an American psychological thriller limited series created and written by Joel Fields and Joe Weisberg, who also serve as showrunners and are executive producers along with Chris Long, Caroline Moore, Victor Hsu, and Steve Carell. The series stars Carell alongside Domhnall Gleeson and Linda Emond in lead roles. It premiered on August 30, 2022, on FX on Hulu and concluded on October 25, 2022, after a ten-episode run.

The series follows a therapist (Carell) who is held captive by a patient (Gleeson), seeking unconventional therapy for his homicidal urges.

The Patient received positive reviews from television critics. Carell's performance earned him a nomination for the Screen Actors Guild Award for Outstanding Performance by a Male Actor in a Miniseries or Television Movie, while Gleeson received nominations for the Golden Globe Award for Best Supporting Actor – Series, Miniseries or Television Film and the Critics' Choice Television Award for Best Supporting Actor in a Movie/Miniseries.

== Synopsis ==
A therapist is held captive by a serial killer who seeks help to curb his homicidal urges.

== Cast and characters ==
=== Main ===
- Steve Carell as Dr. Alan Strauss, a therapist mourning the recent death of his wife
  - Jackson Dollinger as young Alan Strauss
- Domhnall Gleeson as Sam Fortner, a serial killer, new patient of Alan's, and fan of Kenny Chesney. He also works as a restaurant inspector.
- Linda Emond as Candace Fortner, Sam's mother, who is aware of the situation

=== Recurring ===
- Andrew Leeds as Ezra Strauss, the son of Alan and Beth, estranged after he became an Orthodox Jew
- Laura Niemi as Beth Strauss, the recently deceased wife of Alan who died of cancer and was a beloved cantor at her community's Reform synagogue
- Alan Blumenfeld as Chaim Benjamin
- Alex Rich as Elias, a man held captive by Sam and the trigger for why Sam sought out Dr. Strauss
- David Alan Grier as Charlie Addison, Alan's former therapist

== Episodes ==
No.	Title	Directed by	Written by	Original release date
1	"Intake"	Chris Long	Joel Fields & Joe Weisberg	August 30, 2022
2	"Alan Learns to Meditate"	Chris Long	Joel Fields & Joe Weisberg	August 30, 2022
3	"Issues"	Kevin Bray	Joel Fields & Joe Weisberg	September 6, 2022
4	"Company"	Kevin Bray	Joel Fields & Joe Weisberg	September 13, 2022
5	"Pastitsio"	Kevin Bray	Joel Fields & Joe Weisberg	September 20, 2022
6	"Charlie"	Gwyneth Horder-Payton	Joel Fields & Joe Weisberg	September 27, 2022
In the aftermath of Elias' death, Alan finds ways to cope. As Sam digs Elias' grave, Alan imagines himself in a session with his former therapist, Charlie, who advises Alan to address with Sam how his mother was partially responsible for the abuse he suffered as a child. Alan convinces Sam not to bury Elias' body, but to leave it somewhere it will be found, as that is the nicer thing to do for Elias' relatives. As Sam gets ready to take the body, Alan writes Sam's name on a piece of paper and stuffs it into Elias' mouth for the police to find.
7	"Kaddish"	Gwyneth Horder-Payton	Joel Fields & Joe Weisberg	October 4, 2022
Alan continues to disassociate, experiencing visions of a concentration camp and a series of flashbacks to events in his own life. Sam returns to find Alan attempting to recite the Kaddish for his wife but struggling to remember the words. Later, Sam tracks down his elementary school's therapist, Mr. Buchella, and asks if he will be his therapist. Mr. Buchella tells Sam he will consider it, but needs a few days to do so.
8	"Ezra"	Chris Long	Joel Fields & Joe Weisberg	October 11, 2022
Alan imagines having dialogue with his therapist Charlie. He goes through his various family problems that stem from his son being an orthodox Jew with imaginary Charlie. His son Ezra actively looks for him and is worried, he even changes his rigidity about following Jewish prescriptive traditions in small measures. Sam gets agitated after confronting his boss at work, and later that evening stalks and murders his boss in a back alley. Sam informs Alan that he is changing his therapist.
9	"Auschwitz"	Chris Long	Joel Fields & Joe Weisberg	October 18, 2022
Alan continues to hallucinate having meaningful talks with Charlie while sharpening an ointment tube to a blade. In a session, he says to Sam that he has to find meaning to his life and has to build relationships, and as a first step he has to rebuild his relationship with Mary, his ex-wife. When Sam complains that it doesn't work, Alan confronts him by saying that the real object of killing is not his victims or their actions but his father. Sam takes the message wrongly and decides to kill his father.
10	"The Cantor's Husband"	Chris Long	Joel Fields & Joe Weisberg	October 25, 2022
Sam confronts his father about his childhood abuse, and almost kills him before stopping himself and leaving. Alan says it was because Sam doesn't want to become like his father and because Sam is changing as a person who can tolerate other people's shortcomings. He further says it's time to let him go. Sam doesn't feel like honoring his agreement with Alan and prepares for making Alan stay there longer and hints it would be years. Alan isn't ready for it. In the next day's session, he says to Sam that the only proper option for Sam is now institutionalization and that he has to turn in himself. Sam doesn't agree. Alan tries to hurt Sam's mother but ends up being killed by Sam. Alan's family receives a letter written by him from Sam. Sam decides to lock up himself where Alan was locked in and gives the key to his mother.

== Production ==
=== Development ===
In October 2021, The Patient was officially announced and given a ten-episode order by FX on Hulu. Steve Carell was confirmed as the lead star, playing a therapist held captive by a serial killer, and also served as one of the series' executive producers. The series was created by Joel Fields and Joe Weisberg, who are also credited as showrunners and co-writers for each episode. Other executive producers include Caroline Moore, Victor Hsu and Chris Long, with Long also taking on directing duties for several episodes.

=== Casting ===
Alongside the announcement of The Patient in October 2021, Steve Carell was confirmed to star in and executive produce the series. In January 2022, Domhnall Gleeson, Linda Emond, Laura Niemi, and Andrew Leeds were added to the cast. The following month, Alex Rich and David Alan Grier joined the series in recurring roles.

=== Filming ===
Filming for The Patient began in mid-January 2022 in Los Angeles.

== Release ==
The Patient premiered on August 30, 2022, on FX on Hulu. Internationally, the limited series became available on Disney+ in select regions. Later, it aired on FX on April 27, 2023.

== Reception ==
=== Critical response ===
On the review aggregator Rotten Tomatoes, The Patient holds an 89% approval rating based on 63 critic reviews. The website's critics consensus reads, "While The Patient might test viewers' patience by overextending its killer conceit, the arguably career-best work by Carell and Domhnall Gleeson make this therapy session worth eavesdropping on." On Metacritic, which assigns a weighted average score, the series has a rating of 74 out of 100 based on 30 critic reviews, indicating "generally favorable reviews".

For RogerEbert.com, Nick Allen gave it a rating of 2 out of 4 stars, and praised Carell for his "contemplative performance" but criticized Gleeson as too "monotone". Allen also critiqued the show's pacing, stating that it "is a long journey to create empathy in the darkest of minds, but overall it makes for an overlong, dull mind game." For The Guardian, Lucy Mangan graded it 3 out of 5 stars and commended Carell for his "absolutely faultless" performance, but criticized it for being "a bit too slow and repetitive".

=== Accolades ===
Year	Award	Category	Nominee	Result	Ref.
2022	Peabody Award	Entertainment	The Patient	Nominated	
2023	28th Critics' Choice Awards	Best Supporting Actor in a Limited Series or Movie Made for Television	Domhnall Gleeson	Nominated	
2023	80th Golden Globe Awards	Best Supporting Actor – Television Limited Series/Motion Picture	Domhnall Gleeson	Nominated	
2023	29th Screen Actors Guild Awards	Outstanding Performance by a Male Actor in a Television Movie or Limited Series	Steve Carell	Nominated	
2023	39th TCA Awards	Outstanding Achievement in Movies, Miniseries and Specials	The Patient	Nominated	

=== Audience viewership ===
The Patient performed strongly in streaming rankings. According to Whip Media, which tracks viewership data from over 21 million global users via its TV Time app, the series debuted as the ninth most-streamed original in the U.S. during the week of September 4, 2022. It later rose to sixth place by the week of October 9 and climbed to fifth place the week of October 23. By the week of October 30, it reached third place.

Reelgood, which tracks real-time streaming data from 5 million U.S. users, reported The Patient as the eighth most-watched show by August 31, 2022. By September 9, it had moved up to fourth place. Additionally, JustWatch, which collects data from over 20 million users globally, ranked the series as the third most-streamed in the U.S. between September 5–12.
