= Tchaikovsky (The Americans) =

- The Americans episode
- Episode no.: Season 6 Episode 2
- Directed by: Matthew Rhys
- Written by: Joel Fields; Joe Weisberg
- Production code: BDU602
- Original air date: April 4, 2018
- Running time: 45 minutes

Guest appearances
- Reed Birney as Patrick McCleesh; Scott Cohen as Glenn Haskard; Miriam Shor as Erica Haskard; Victor Slezak as General Rennhull; Anthony Arkin as Stavos; Darya Ekamasova as Sofia Bystrova; Yuri Kolokolnikov as Gennadi Bystrov; Don Stephenson as Jeremy Branch

Episode chronology
← Previous "Dead Hand"	Next → "Urban Transport Planning"
- The Americans season 6

"Tchaikovsky" is the second episode of the sixth season of the period drama television series The Americans, and the 67th overall episode of the series. It originally aired on FX in the United States on April 4, 2018. The episode is set during early October 1987; a baseball game heard on the radio during this episode took place on October 4, 1987.

== Plot ==
Stan gets a message that "Teacup" (Gennadi's cover name) wants to meet with him; he learns that Sofia (who has married Gennadi during the past three years) has kicked him out, but Gennadi still makes a Soviet courier run with an FBI team covertly X-raying his diplomatic pouch. Stan and Dennis worry that Sofia's chattiness with her new friend Bogdan at TASS will compromise Gennadi's work with the FBI. Dennis also tells Stan that Oleg Burov is in D.C., registered for a class on urban transport planning (consistent with his current work in the Soviet Ministry of Transport).

Elizabeth meets with her CIA contact Patrick McCleesh to gather information before the summit and has to sneak into the State Department (where she claimed to be employed) to have lunch with him. He discloses Ronald Reagan's onset of Alzheimer's. For Dead Hand, Elizabeth pressures General (formerly Colonel) Rennhull to hand over a lithium-based radiation sensor by threatening to expose his contact with the Soviets six years earlier (regarding the US Strategic Defense Initiative, in the episode "The Colonel").

Philip discovers that Dupont Circle Travel has lost Jeremy, an important client of 15 years, to a budget travel agency. In the aftermath, both Stavros, the responsible employee (in person), and Henry (by phone) note that Philip should have retained the client himself instead of handing him off to an employee.

After a Soviet lesson on Tchaikovsky from Claudia, Paige asks Elizabeth if the Soviets ever use sex to get information, which she read about in a book that she purchased. Elizabeth at first denies it outright, claiming that this is merely Western propaganda, but then hedges, saying that it may happen in rare cases.

As "Stephanie", a private nurse for terminally-ill artist Erica Haskard (the wife of US weapons negotiator Glenn Haskard), Elizabeth hears the Haskards discuss her potential assisted suicide. "Stephanie" discourages Glenn Haskard from proceeding, and Claudia later reminds Elizabeth that she needs to keep Erica alive until after the summit. During a subsequent shift, Erica asks "Stephanie" to draw a picture of a mug on a bedside table, but just the dark parts.

Later, when Elizabeth meets Rennhull to get the radiation sensor, he refuses to cooperate, and she again threatens to reveal his prior contact and sets up a fallback exchange date. At this fallback date, he instead pulls a gun on her. When she jumps him, he fatally shoots himself through the jaw, splattering blood and brains over her face just as Paige breaks lookout cover and runs to her mother's aid.

== Production ==
The episode was written by series creators Joel Fields and Joe Weisberg and directed by Matthew Rhys.

== Reception ==
In its original American broadcast, "Tchaikovsky" was seen by an estimated 616,000 household viewers and gained a 0.15 ratings share among adults aged 18–49, according to Nielsen Media Research.

The episode received positive reviews. Review aggregator website Rotten Tomatoes gave it 91% "Fresh" ratings and average rating of 7.87 out of 10, based on 11 reviews, with consensus reading "Tchaikovsky slows the momentum of its predecessor while threatening to push the conflict between family, career, and personal conviction to a breaking point in the lives of The Americans' core characters.". The A.V. Club gave the episode a 'B' grade.
