= Harvest (The Americans) =

- The Americans episode
- Episode no.: Season 6 Episode 7
- Directed by: Stefan Schwartz
- Written by: Sarah Nolen
- Production code: BDU607
- Original air date: May 9, 2018
- Running time: 50 minutes

Guest appearances
- Miriam Shor as Erica Haskard; Russell G. Jones as Norm; Jonathan Kells Phillips as "Harvest"; Amy Tribbey as Marilyn; Aaron Roman Weiner as Agent Brooks

Episode chronology
← Previous "Rififi"	Next → "The Summit"
- The Americans season 6

"Harvest" is the seventh episode of the sixth season of the period drama television series The Americans. It originally aired on FX in the United States on May 9, 2018.

== Plot ==
Philip tells Stan that he has to go to Houston to help Elizabeth with a client and asks Stan to look after Henry and to take Henry to meet his ride back to school. Before Philip leaves, Stan notes Philip and Elizabeth's stress and the odd hours they keep as travel agents. Philip tells Stan that the travel agency is failing.

Philip arrives in Chicago, where Elizabeth is surprised but happy to see him. While Stan drives Henry to meet his ride to school, Henry says that he has never met any member of either parent's family, not even Elizabeth's "Aunt Helen", although Paige has. Philip and Elizabeth walk through the plan to extricate "Harvest" from CIA surveillance, which has a window for success that may be as little as 30 seconds. Philip and Norm hire five day laborers. In a precise operation, Philip drives a shuttle bus while a second truck blocks the FBI's view of "Harvest". One of the day laborers replaces "Harvest" as driver of his car, while "Harvest" boards the shuttle with Philip and Elizabeth. They then turn and transfer from the bus to an escape van driven by Marilyn. However, before they fully leave the area, the FBI discovers the switch, and two FBI agents block the road. When Marilyn tries to drive through, they fire and fatally wound Marilyn, but both are killed by return fire from a seriously wounded "Harvest", who escapes with Philip and Elizabeth. "Harvest" tells Philip that the Altheon sensor schematic is in France, then he swallows his cyanide capsule. While switching cars again, Philip uses an axe to remove Marilyn's head and hands to prevent her identification, and Elizabeth puts them in a bag and throws it into a nearby river. On the plane back to DC, Elizabeth draws sketches for homework assigned by Erica.

At the FBI, Dennis is crushed by the two agents' deaths in Chicago and the loss of "Harvest", while Stan asks about sketches of others from this escape. Remembering William's description of a spy couple with two kids, Stan breaks into the Jennings' house and thoroughly searches the house, basement, and garage during their absence but finds nothing. He later reviews the files from a prior case with a similar escape and the sketches from another similar escape. Elizabeth reminds Philip that the summit starts in a week. Erica continues working with "Stephanie" on how to create art. After "Stephanie's" shift, Elizabeth visits Philip at the travel agency and learns about the layoffs there. Elizabeth then visits Paige at school and tells Paige about Marilyn's death. Paige says that she does not have any friends and wants to continue as a Soviet agent; Elizabeth then says that it is now time for Paige to apply for an internship with the State Department. At home, Philip remembers his wedding to Elizabeth three years previously.

== Production ==
The episode was written by Sarah Nolen, and directed by Stefan Schwartz.

== Reception ==
In its original American broadcast, "Harvest" was seen by an estimated 671,000 household viewers and gained a 0.17 ratings share among adults aged 18–49, according to Nielsen Media Research, improvement of 0.02 over the previous episode.

The episode received critical acclaim. Review aggregator website Rotten Tomatoes gave the episode 100% "Fresh" ratings and average rating of 8.86 out of 10, based on 12 reviews, with consensus reading, "A tense professional reunion further sets the stage for The Americans' endgame in 'Harvest' as tensions mount, long-buried secrets threaten to surface, and a fateful decision demands to be made." The A.V. Club gave the episode an 'A−' grade.
