= Rififi (The Americans) =

- The Americans episode
- Episode no.: Season 6 Episode 6
- Directed by: Kevin Bray
- Written by: Stephen Schiff; Justin Weinberger
- Production code: BDU606
- Original air date: May 2, 2018
- Running time: 45 minutes

Guest appearances
- Austin Abrams as Jackson Barber; Laurie Holden as Renee; Anthony Arkin as Stavos; Todd Faulkner as Agent Loeb; Amy Tribbey as Marilyn; Aaron Roman Weiner as Agent Brooks

Episode chronology
← Previous "The Great Patriotic War"	Next → "Harvest"
- The Americans season 6

"Rififi" is the sixth episode of the sixth season of the period drama television series The Americans. It originally aired on FX in the United States on May 2, 2018.

== Plot ==
When Elizabeth (Keri Russell) returns home from drinking with Claudia and Paige, Philip (Matthew Rhys) tells her about Stan's visit and that Philip sabotaged the Kimmy kidnapping as a result. Dennis tells Stan (Noah Emmerich) that the X-rays of one of Gennadi's diplomatic pouches showed that the pouch contained a sensor chip from Altheon in Chicago, which (because of the D.C. killings related to Altheon) led the FBI to a vulnerable Altheon engineer in Chicago. In turn, he identified a Russian illegal code-named "Harvest", whom the FBI currently have under surveillance. Dennis and Stan also note the upcoming summit and Oleg's return, which they do not believe are coincidental. Dennis convinces Stan to temporarily return to counterintelligence and lead an effort to run down leads in D.C. based on the tradecraft used by "Harvest", such as small business fronts, cars bought from free paper ads for cash, advance payment of utilities at safe houses, and contact with Russian Orthodox priests.

Henry comes home for Thanksgiving and sees the distance between his parents. Following Paige's idea, Elizabeth pretends to be a D.C. consultant and makes contact with Jackson, a congressional intern from Sam Nunn's office. Philip lays off three of his travel agents, beginning with Stavos.

Claudia notifies Elizabeth and Marilyn to go to Chicago to extricate "Harvest", who was also working on Dead Hand, and reminds Elizabeth that neither she nor "Harvest" can be captured. When "Harvest" realizes that he's being followed, Elizabeth has to leave on Thanksgiving, causing her to miss the Jennings' Thanksgiving dinner at Stan's with Renee and Dennis's family. Renee thanks Dennis for advancing her application to the FBI. After dinner, Philip reviews Elizabeth's hidden records, including her drawings from Emily's lessons, and "dead drops" a coded message to Oleg, which Oleg retrieves and decodes in his hotel room. Elizabeth and Marilyn agree that their chances of success with "Harvest" are poor. Elizabeth calls Henry, which Philip interprets as a possible "last call" before her death. Philip calls Elizabeth and asks her to abort the mission; when she refuses, he offers to go to Chicago to help.

== Production ==
The episode was written by Stephen Schiff and Justin Weinberger, and directed by Kevin Bray. The title of the episode is based on the 1955 French film, Rififi, which is the movie that Elizabeth and Jackson (the intern) see when she makes first contact.

== Reception ==
In its original American broadcast, "Rififi" was seen by an estimated 611,000 household viewers and gained a 0.15 ratings share among adults aged 18–49, according to Nielsen Media Research.

The episode received positive reviews. Review aggregator website Rotten Tomatoes gave the episode 100% "Fresh" ratings and average rating of 8.8 out of 10, based on 11 reviews, with consensus reading, "The fan is finally getting hit in Rifiki,(sic) where hostility and lack of trust feed the peaking series arc as the fates of these damaged characters begin to manifest." The A.V. Club gave the episode an 'A−' grade. Alan Sepinwall from Uproxx praised the episode, but complained about uneven pacing of the episode and season in general.
