= Laura Niemi =

American actress

- Born: Los Angeles, California, U.S.
- Education: Beverly Hills High School
- Occupations: Actress; producer; theatre director
- Years active: 2002–present
- Known for: This Is Us
- Spouse: Adam Gascoine (m. 2006)

Laura Niemi (/ˈniːmi/ NEE-mee) is an American actress, producer, and theatre director. She is best known for portraying Marilyn Pearson in the NBC drama series This Is Us (2017–2022). She has also appeared in the television series The Patient, Grey's Anatomy, Stranger Things, Quantum Leap, 9-1-1: Lone Star, The Sex Lives of College Girls, Firefly, and Days of Our Lives. Her film credits include Lake Alice (2017), The Last Thing He Wanted (2020), and Those Who Wish Me Dead (2021).

== Early life and education ==
Niemi was born in Los Angeles, California, to film producer Vicki Niemi. She was raised in Santa Monica and the San Fernando Valley and attended Beverly Hills High School.

During childhood, Niemi studied acting at the Academy of Performing Arts in Los Angeles. After relocating with her family to the East Coast, she studied piano at the Eastman School of Music in Rochester, New York. She later returned to California, where she performed as a bass guitarist in Los Angeles-based bands before pursuing a career in acting.

== Career ==
Niemi made her screen acting debut with a guest appearance in the television series Firefly in 2002. She subsequently appeared in guest and recurring roles in the television series Bones, Criminal Minds, Smith, Private Practice, The Mentalist, NCIS: Los Angeles, Justified, Rizzoli & Isles, Castle, Grey's Anatomy, 9-1-1: Lone Star, Stranger Things, Quantum Leap, The Sex Lives of College Girls, and Days of Our Lives.

In addition to television, Niemi has appeared in the films The Pink Ladies (2003), Chastity Bites (2013), Jobs (2013), Lake Alice (2017), Hometown Hero (2017), The Divorce (2019), The Last Thing He Wanted (2020), and Those Who Wish Me Dead (2021). She also appeared in the television films Annie Claus Is Coming to Town (2011) and 911 Nightmare (2015).

From 2017 to 2022, Niemi portrayed Marilyn Pearson, the mother of Jack Pearson, in the NBC drama series This Is Us. The recurring character appeared primarily in flashback sequences depicting Jack Pearson's childhood and family history. During the series' final season, Niemi reprised the role in episodes depicting Marilyn Pearson's death.

In 2022, Niemi portrayed Beth Strauss in the FX psychological drama miniseries The Patient, starring Steve Carell and Domhnall Gleeson. Her character, the deceased wife of therapist Alan Strauss, appeared throughout the series in flashback sequences. As the character is depicted as a cantor, Niemi performed the traditional Jewish songs Not by Might, Not by Power, Ma Yafeh Hayom, and Dodi Li, which were featured in the series. Her performance was listed among the performers eligible for consideration in the Outstanding Supporting Actress in a Limited or Anthology Series or TV Movie category for the 75th Primetime Emmy Awards.

That same year, she portrayed Mrs. Gracey, Eleven's teacher, in the fourth-season premiere of the Netflix science fiction series Stranger Things. She also appeared in episodes of Grey's Anatomy and 9-1-1: Lone Star.

Alongside her screen work, Niemi has appeared in stage productions at the Geffen Playhouse, South Coast Repertory, and the Mark Taper Forum. In 2005, she portrayed R.C. in the Lost Angels Theatre Company's production of Tracy Letts' Bug, directed by Scott Cummins.

In 2023, Niemi appeared in the world premiere of Greg Burdick's Accommodation at the Odyssey Theatre in Los Angeles.

Niemi founded the Lost Angels Theatre Company and serves as its artistic director. In 2016, she co-founded the comedy group ShowFriends, which later entered into a production agreement with Funny or Die to produce comedy shorts. She also served as a producer on the series.

== Awards and honors ==
In 2005, Niemi received two Los Angeles Ovation Awards for the Lost Angels Theatre Company's production of Killer Joe, as a member of the ensemble cast and a producer.

In 2018, she received an Honorable Mention for Best Actress at the Los Angeles Film Awards for her performance in the short film The Divorce.

== Filmography ==
=== Film ===
| Year | Title | Role | Notes |
|---|---|---|---|
| 2003 | The Pink Ladies | Summer | |
| 2011 | Annie Claus Is Coming to Town | Leanne | Television film |
| 2013 | Chastity Bites | Jillian | |
| 2013 | Jobs | Supporting role | |
| 2015 | 911 Nightmare | Janet | Television film |
| 2017 | Lake Alice | Natalie Thomas | |
| 2017 | Hometown Hero | Gloria | |
| 2019 | The Divorce | Sally | Short film |
| 2020 | The Last Thing He Wanted | Olivia | |
| 2021 | Those Who Wish Me Dead | Maggie | |
| TBA | Out of the Blue | Sharon | Short film; post-production |
| TBA | Sloth Man | Bespectacled Casting Director | Short film; post-production |
| TBA | Survival of the Fittest | — | Short film; pre-production |

=== Television ===
| Year | Title | Role | Notes |
|---|---|---|---|
| 2002 | Firefly | Woman | Episode: "The Train Job" |
| 2005 | Bones | Melissa Howes | Episode |
| 2005 | Criminal Minds | Guest role | Episode |
| 2006 | Smith | Guest role | Episode |
| 2007 | Private Practice | Betty Crawford | Episode |
| 2007–2026 | Days of Our Lives | Evelyn Quarry / Dr. Phoebe Singer | 4 episodes |
| 2008 | The Mentalist | Mandy Schultz | Episode |
| 2009 | NCIS: Los Angeles | Guest role | Episode |
| 2010 | Justified | Guest role | Episode |
| 2013 | Rizzoli & Isles | Dr. Carla Dalton | Episode: "Cold as Ice" |
| 2013 | Castle | Guest role | Episode |
| 2016–2017 | ShowFriends | Network Executive / Principal / HR Person | 8 episodes |
| 2017–2022 | This Is Us | Marilyn Pearson | Recurring role (6 episodes) |
| 2018 | Liza on Demand | Amanda | Episode |
| 2019 | TMI Hollywood | Various / Host / Herself | 3 episodes |
| 2022 | Grey's Anatomy | Cynthia | Episode |
| 2022 | 9-1-1: Lone Star | Mary-Lynne | Episode |
| 2022 | Stranger Things | Mrs. Gracey | Episode: "Chapter One: The Hellfire Club" |
| 2022 | The Patient | Beth Strauss | Miniseries; 9 episodes |
| 2023 | Quantum Leap | Kathy Tanner | Episode |
| 2025 | The Sex Lives of College Girls | Amy | Episode |

=== As producer ===
| Year | Title | Credit | Notes |
|---|---|---|---|
| 2016–2017 | ShowFriends | Producer | 8 episodes |

=== Soundtrack ===
| Year | Title | Credit | Notes |
|---|---|---|---|
| 2022 | The Patient | Performer | "Not by Might, Not by Power", "Ma Yafeh Hayom", and "Dodi Li" (3 episodes) |

=== Podcasts ===
| Year | Podcast | Role | Notes |
|---|---|---|---|
| 2026 | Where Working Actors Talk | Guest | 1 episode |
