= START (The Americans) =

- The Americans episode
- Episode no.: Season 6 Episode 10
- Directed by: Chris Long
- Written by: Joel Fields; Joe Weisberg
- Production code: BDU610
- Original air date: May 30, 2018
- Running time: 70 minutes

Guest appearances
- Lev Gorn as Arkady; Laurie Holden as Renee; Boris Krutonog as Igor Burov; Konstantin Lavysh as Father Andrei; Joe Lanza as Rick; Joseph Melendez as Agent Ganzel; Derek Luke as Gregory Thomas

Episode chronology
← Previous "Jennings, Elizabeth"	Next → —
- The Americans season 6

"START" is the tenth episode of the sixth season and the series finale of the period drama television series The Americans. It originally aired on FX in the United States on May 30, 2018.

== Plot ==
After meeting at an abandoned garage in D.C., Philip and Elizabeth agree to take Paige to the USSR but leave Henry at boarding school. Elizabeth is heartbroken but agrees with Philip. FBI agents are ordered to stake out the suspect garages; en route, Stan calls Philip at work and at home, but he is not there. Stan leaves his assigned stakeout and goes to watch Paige's apartment, without telling his partner. Dennis presses Father Andrei for information about the illegals; Andrei finally admits having seen them once without disguises.

Arkady tells Igor that Oleg has been arrested by the FBI and charged with espionage, and since he was in America on a student visa, he will not be eligible for a prisoner exchange. Igor says he will go directly to Gorbachev, but Arkady warns him that Gorbachev is at risk and everyone supporting him may be in danger. Grief-stricken, Igor tells his daughter-in-law, who is in tears while trying to calm her and Oleg's baby.

Philip and Elizabeth pick up Paige, who doesn't want to leave Henry alone. They are watched covertly by Stan, who confronts them in a parking garage. After questioning, Stan draws his pistol to arrest them. Philip finally admits their work as Soviet agents, saying "We had a job to do". Stan then questions whether Paige dating Matthew was part of their plot. Interrupting Elizabeth's denial, Paige admits she learned of this at age 16, but only dated Matthew because she liked him. She also says that Henry still doesn't know what her parents do. Stan mentions the murders, including of Gennadi and Sofia; Philip and Elizabeth deny being involved, saying that killing isn't what they do. Stan angrily calls Philip a liar and says that Philip was his best friend and that Philip has made his life a joke. Philip counters that Stan was the only friend he ever had and confesses the sad duality of his life and that he retired to become a "shitty failing travel agent".

They tell Stan about the KGB plan to alter Elizabeth's reports to justify a coup against Gorbachev. Stan asks if Philip knows Oleg, adding that the FBI had intercepted the dead drop. Philip and Elizabeth plead with Stan to have this information sent to the USSR. Philip acknowledges that Stan has no reason to trust him, but says that they are getting in their car and leaving. Paige, and then Philip, ask Stan to look after Henry and tell him the truth about his family, and Philip tells Stan of his suspicions about Renee. Stan allows them to leave. The Jennings family get out their disguises and Canadian passports. They stop to bury the evidence of their American lives, including the false passport that Henry will never use. They call Henry at school; Paige is too emotional to speak with him.

The FBI agents are recalled. Dennis shows Stan the sketches based on Andrei's descriptions, which confirm that the illegals are Philip and Elizabeth. Stan pretends to be surprised and vows to Dennis that he will kill Philip. Dennis apologizes for doubting Stan's earlier suspicions. As the FBI searches the Jennings' home, Renee comforts Stan, and he thereafter leaves for New Hampshire to tell Henry about his parents; upon his departure, she gives an enigmatic glance towards the house. Philip, Elizabeth, and Paige get a final American meal from McDonald's. They then sit separately on a train to Montreal, and get through the border security at Rouses Point, New York. However, Philip and Elizabeth are shocked as the train leaves the US when they see Paige standing on the platform alone. Paige returns to Claudia's abandoned safehouse and pours herself a vodka. Elizabeth dreams about her children and of Gregory while on the plane to Europe. Philip and Elizabeth enter the USSR by car and meet Arkady to drive to Moscow, then reminisce about their life choices.

== Production ==
The episode was written by Joel Fields and Joe Weisberg, and directed by Chris Long. The episode title refers to the Strategic Arms Reduction Treaty between the US and the USSR, for which negotiations began in earnest following the Washington Summit. Also, Elizabeth's vision of her life had she remained in the USSR in the final scene followed the plot of Moscow Does Not Believe in Tears, which she had watched with Paige and Claudia in the episode "Dead Hand".

== Reception ==
In its original American broadcast, "START" was seen by an estimated 922,000 household viewers and gained a 0.22 ratings share among adults aged 18–49, the highest for the season.

"START" was critically acclaimed as one of the best finales of all time. Review aggregator website Rotten Tomatoes gave the episode a 100% rating and average rating of 9.8 out of 10, based on 27 reviews, with consensus reading, "The Americans' series finale offers viewers closure and uncertainty with an outcome that's as devastating as it is full of potential." Alan Sepinwall from Uproxx called it a heartbreaking and unexpected finale and said, "It's not what I expected, or maybe even wanted, but it also felt right, and the slow and painful deployment of each new development left me riveted." Erik Adams from The A.V. Club rated the episode 'A' and said, "The Americans ends as it lived: Tense, affecting, and one of the greats." Mike Hale from The New York Times summarized his positive review as, "For me, it was fitting, and the finale was tremendously satisfying, if not perfect in its details."

For his performance in this episode, Matthew Rhys won the Primetime Emmy Award for Outstanding Lead Actor in a Drama Series. Joel Fields and Joe Weisberg also won the Emmy for Outstanding Writing for a Drama Series for their work on this episode.
