= Dead Hand (The Americans) =

- The Americans episode
- Episode no.: Season 6 Episode 1
- Directed by: Chris Long
- Written by: Joel Fields; Joe Weisberg
- Production code: BDU601
- Original air date: March 28, 2018
- Running time: 53 minutes

Guest appearances
- Reed Birney as Patrick McCleesh; Scott Cohen as Glenn Haskard; Lev Gorn as Arkady Ivanovich Zotov; Laurie Holden as Renee; Miriam Shor as Erica Haskard; Anthony Arkin as Stavos; Michael Khmurov as General Kovtun

Episode chronology
← Previous "The Soviet Division"	Next → "Tchaikovsky"
- The Americans season 6

"Dead Hand" is the sixth season premiere of the American television drama series The Americans, and the 66th overall episode of the series. It originally aired on March 28, 2018 in the United States on FX.

== Plot ==
In the three years between 1984 and 1987, Philip has become a full-time travel agent running an expanded Dupont Circle Travel, Henry attends boarding school and plays hockey, and Paige attends George Washington University in D.C. and is a Soviet agent in training (and also is learning about Russia by watching Soviet movies with Elizabeth and Claudia). Stan has married Renee and has moved out of FBI counterintelligence except for the now-married Sofia and Gennadi (whom he still handles with his ex-partner Dennis Aderholt, the new head of counterintelligence), while Elizabeth is exhausted and resentful from handling a full KGB case load alone nine weeks before the Reagan-Gorbachev summit in D.C. (December 8–10, 1987), with most of her work focused on the summit.

Claudia informs Elizabeth that she has been ordered by certain unknown parties in the Center to travel to Mexico City and meet with General Kovtun of the Soviet Strategic Rocket Forces, who tells her about "Dead Hand" (a doomsday device) and the Soviet military's plan to overthrow Gorbachev if he renounces it. Kovtun asks Elizabeth to spy on a Soviet negotiator, Fyodor Nesterenko, who is meeting with American negotiator Glenn Haskard (whom Elizabeth is monitoring as "Stephanie", a home health care aide for his wife Erica, a terminally ill artist). Kovtun also gives Elizabeth a cyanide pill to take if captured.

Meanwhile in the USSR, Arkady, now deputy chief of Directorate S and a Gorbachev supporter, recruits Oleg, now married (out of which has a son) and out of the KGB (but also a Gorbachev supporter), to travel to the US and ask Philip to uncover and if possible, stop Elizabeth's unapproved new mission. Due to internal Soviet opposition to Gorbachev within the Center, Arkady cannot trust his own officers with this task. After arriving in D.C., Oleg signals Philip and then meets with him, telling Philip that he will stay in D.C. (without official cover) to await Philip's answer.

While Paige is on a surveillance detail, a young US security officer tries to coerce her for a date by taking her fake college ID. Elizabeth praises her for keeping her cover, but she realises it is too risky for that officer to keep Paige's fake ID. Elizabeth tracks him down, stabs him and recovers the ID.

That night, when Philip tries to tell Elizabeth about Oleg's visit and points out the emotional toll of her job, she rudely dismisses him.

== Production ==
The episode was written by Joel Fields and series creator Joe Weisberg and directed by Chris Long. The Soviet movie watched by Paige, Elizabeth, and Claudia in the episode was the 1980 Academy Award winner for Best Foreign Language Film, Moscow Does Not Believe in Tears.

The episode "Dead Hand" is dedicated to the memory of Ning Li, who worked in the Series Camera and Electrical Department as Digital Media Manager from 2014-2016. Ning Li died 1 November 2017, in Brooklyn New York. He was 43.

== Reception ==
In its original American broadcast, "Dead Hand" was seen by an estimated 642,000 household viewers and gained a 0.14 ratings share among adults aged 18–49, according to Nielsen Media Research.

"Dead Hand" received critical acclaim. On Rotten Tomatoes, the episode has a 100% approval rating with an average score of 9.8 out of 10 based on 14 reviews, with the consensus stating: "Tensions mount in 'Dead Hand,' an unusually fast-paced installment that barrels toward the show's seemingly inevitable endgame." The A.V. Club gave the episode a perfect A grade. Alan Sepinwall from Uproxx reviewed it positively saying, "'Dead Hand' wastes little time in establishing just how bad the conclusion could be for all involved."
