= The Great Patriotic War (The Americans) =

- The Americans episode
- Episode no.: Season 6 Episode 5
- Directed by: Thomas Schlamme
- Written by: Hilary Bettis
- Production code: BDU605
- Original air date: April 25, 2018
- Running time: 58 minutes

Guest appearances
- Scott Cohen as Glenn Haskard; Julia Garner as Kimberly Breland; Laurie Holden as Renee; Miriam Shor as Erica Haskard; Eugene Alper as KGB Rezident; Vera Cherny as Tatiana Vyazemtseva; Darya Ekamasova as Sofia Bystrova; Keenan Jolliff as Tony; Yuri Kolokolnikov as Gennadi Bystrov; Colton Ryan as Vince

Episode chronology
← Previous "Mr. and Mrs. Teacup"	Next → "Rififi"
- The Americans season 6

"The Great Patriotic War" is the fifth episode of the sixth season of the period drama television series The Americans. It originally aired on FX in the United States on April 25, 2018.

== Plot ==
Marilyn and Norm locate both Gennadi and Sofia, who are living separately, by following Stan. Sofia tells Stan that she and her son Ilya want to be reunited with Gennadi. Claudia and Elizabeth tell Paige about World War II from a Russian perspective. Using a surveillance picture taken by Paige, Claudia identifies a CIA officer from the Soviet Division meeting with Nesterenko, along with a high level staffer from senator Sam Nunn's office.

Elizabeth sleeps with Philip and, in the morning, asks him to go to Greece with Kimmy and take her to Bulgaria, where she will be arrested with (planted) drugs (in more of a kidnapping) to blackmail her father about Nesterenko. Elizabeth approaches Gennadi on his way back to his safe house, but just as she reaches him, his bodyguard shows up, and she walks away. Stan suggests to Renee that she could work in the FBI personnel office. At a campus bar, Paige meets a boy who tries to pick her up, until his rude friend starts insulting her. When she starts to leave, the rude friend grabs her, and she beats him up, then punches the first boy in the nose when he follows her. "Jim" (Philip) meets Kimmy in Ann Arbor, but she is not enthusiastic about meeting him in Greece. To change her opinion, "Jim" and Kimmy make love. "Stephanie" gets another art lesson from Erica. Tatiana locates Oleg at class and blames him for William's capture in 1984, which cost her a promotion and stalled her career. She then has the new KGB rezident notify the Center that Oleg is in the U.S. and is not loyal.

Paige comes over to her parents' house for a sparring session and tells them both about the bar fight and Brian. Elizabeth tells Philip that Paige may not be cut out for spying; Philip states that she can do it but should not. Philip visits Paige's apartment to discuss the bar fight. Paige states that she is not like Philip, that she believes in the cause. He challenges her to spar and gets her in a chokehold she cannot break, releasing her just before suffocation. Elizabeth climbs the fire escape to break into Gennadi's and unexpectedly finds Sofia there visiting; she kills both Gennadi and Sofia, leaving 7-year-old Ilya alive. Claudia and Elizabeth teach Paige to drink olive oil first to be able to consume more alcohol, and then they all test their drinking capacity by getting drunk on vodka. Over a beer, a crushed Stan tells Philip about the murdered couple and their orphaned son, who found his parents covered in blood. After Stan leaves, Philip calls Kimmy to cancel "Jim's" trip to Greece and to break up with her, and then tells her not to visit any communist country while in Europe.

== Production ==
The episode was written by Hilary Bettis and directed by Thomas Schlamme.

== Reception ==
In its original American broadcast, "The Great Patriotic War" was seen by an estimated 538,000 household viewers and gained a 0.14 ratings share among adults aged 18–49, according to Nielsen Media Research. It has the lowest viewership of any episode in the series.

"The Great Patriotic War" received critical acclaim, with many reviewers calling it one of the best episodes of the series. Review aggregator website Rotten Tomatoes gave the episode 100% "Fresh" ratings and average rating of 9.42 out of 10, based on 10 reviews, with consensus reading, "'The Great Patriotic War' is taut and purposefully paced with glimmers of humor, heart, and heightened stakes for a good majority of The Americans' cast of characters." The A.V. Club gave the episode an 'A' grade. Alan Sepinwall from Uproxx praised the episode as well, saying, "The final season to this point had been slow-playing the plot to a degree, but with 'The Great Patriot[ic] War'—the rare super-sized drama episode that earns every extra minute, and never feels padded or self-indulgent, thanks to a marvelous and weighty script by Hilary Bettis and the usual precise direction from the great Tommy Schlamme—it's clear the endgame is now in full swing, and things can only get uglier from here."
