= The Soviet Division =

- The Americans episode
- Episode no.: Season 5 Episode 13
- Directed by: Chris Long
- Written by: Joel Fields; Joe Weisberg
- Cinematography by: Joseph Bradley Smith
- Editing by: Daniel Valverde; Katie Ennis
- Production code: BDU513
- Original air date: May 30, 2017
- Running time: 54 minutes

Guest appearances
- Kelly AuCoin as Pastor Tim; Julia Garner as Kimberly "Kimmy" Breland; Laurie Holden as Renee; Irina Dvorovenko as Evgheniya Morozova; Zack Gafin as Pasha Morozov; Suzy Jane Hunt as Alice; Yuri Kolokolnikov as Gennadi Bystrov; Ivan Mok as Tuan Eckert; Alexander Rapoport as Volodya; Alexander Sokovikov as Alexei Morozov; Paul Urcioli as Polygraph Administrator; Margo Martindale as Claudia; Alison Wright as Martha Hanson (special guest star)

Episode chronology
← Previous "The World Council of Churches"	Next → "Dead Hand"
- The Americans season 5

"The Soviet Division" is the thirteenth episode and season finale of the fifth season of the American period spy drama television series The Americans. It is the 65th overall episode of the series and was written by executive producer Joel Fields and series creator Joe Weisberg, and directed by Chris Long. It was released on FX on May 30, 2017.

The series is set during the Cold War and follows Elizabeth and Philip Jennings, two Soviet KGB intelligence officers posing as an American married couple living in Falls Church, a Virginia suburb of Washington, D.C., with their American-born children Paige and Henry. It also explores the conflict between Washington's FBI office and the KGB Rezidentura there, from the perspectives of agents on both sides, including the Jennings' neighbor Stan Beeman, an FBI agent working in counterintelligence. In the episode, Philip and Elizabeth continue in trying to get the Morozov family in leaving the country.

According to Nielsen Media Research, the episode was seen by an estimated 0.77 million household viewers and gained a 0.2 ratings share among adults aged 18–49. The episode received extremely positive reviews from critics, although some were divided over the nature of the episode and the season as a whole. For the episode, Joel Fields and Joe Weisberg were nominated for Outstanding Writing for a Drama Series at the 69th Primetime Emmy Awards.

== Plot ==
Philip (Matthew Rhys), Elizabeth (Keri Russell) and Tuan (Ivan Mok) visit Pasha's house to check on him after Tuan admits he told Pasha to fake a suicide attempt. They are interrupted by the arrival of Alexei (Alexander Sokovikov) and Evgheniya Mozorov (Irina Dvorovenko) arrive, who allow them inside. They discover Pasha (Zack Gafin) bleeding in his bedroom and assist Alexei and Evgheniya until an ambulance arrives.

Renee (Laurie Holden) has moved in with Stan (Noah Emmerich), which raises Philip's suspicions. Philip and Elizabeth report the events to Claudia (Margo Martindale), with Philip expressing guilt over having destroyed the Mozorov family. Claudia tell them that Evgheniya wants to take Pasha back to the USSR, although Alexei is reluctant to return because he defected to the United States. Philip and Elizabeth visit the couple again, but Philip fails to persuade Alexei to leave the country with his family

They privately inform Tuan that they will recommend that the Centre assign him to a new field. Furious, Tuan reveals that he has written a report accusing them of being irresponsible in their duties. Elizabeth takes Tuan aside and tells him that the report will not harm her or Philip, and that he will fail if he continues to work alone.

In Moscow, Martha (Alison Wright) meets with her language instructor, Volodya (Alexander Rapoport) at a park. Volodya says that he spoke with Gabriel, who wanted to reconcile with Martha over what had happened between them. Martha is also informed that she will be allowed to adopt a young girl named Olya.

Stan considers leaving the FBI, but Renee convinces him to stay. Henry (Keidrich Sellati) is accepted into St. Edward's Academy in New Hampshire, although Philip later tells him that he will not be attending. Unbeknownst to Henry, Philip and Elizabeth are planning to move the family back to the USSR.

Philip also informs Kimmy (Julia Garner) that he is leaving, falsely claiming he is going to Japan. As he retrieves the final tape from her father Isaac's suitcase, Philip discovers that Isaac has been promoted to head of the CIA's Soviet division. Although Philip initially hesitates to pass on the information, he suggests to Elizabeth that they could hand this assignment to someone else. Elizabeth opposes the idea, believing that obtaining intelligence from someone of Isaac's stature was a critical mission objective.

They subsequently decide against moving, although Elizabeth says that she will handle missions alone from then on, recognising that Philip has become emotionally exhausted and is no longer effective in field operations.

== Production ==
=== Development ===
In May 2017, FX confirmed that the thirteenth and final episode of the season would be titled "The Soviet Division", and that it would be written by executive producer Joel Fields and series creator Joe Weisberg, and directed by Chris Long. This was Fields' 20th writing credit, Weisberg's 21st writing credit, and Long's sixth directing credit.

=== Filming ===
Filming for the episode wrapped on March 13, 2017.

== Reception ==
=== Viewers ===
In its original American broadcast, "The Soviet Division" was seen by an estimated 0.77 million household viewers with a 0.2 in the 18-49 demographics. This means that 0.2 percent of all households with televisions watched the episode. This was a 16% increase in viewership from the previous episode, which was watched by 0.66 million household viewers with a 0.2 in the 18-49 demographics.

=== Critical reviews ===
"The Soviet Division" received mostly positive reviews from critics. The review aggregator website Rotten Tomatoes reported a 93% approval rating for the episode, based on 15 reviews. The site's consensus states: "'The Soviet Division' concludes season 5 with a quietly powerful look at its core characters' internal struggles while laying crucial groundwork for The Americans's final arc."

Eric Goldman of IGN gave the episode a "great" 8.5 out of 10 and wrote in his verdict, "The Americans season finale found Elizabeth and Philip finalizing their plans to finally return to Russia... only to find that their duty to their country would stop them from doing so after all. Season 5 felt a bit stretched out, in anticipation of the final season next year, but the finale still delivered some big, emotional moments, as we saw the panic to save Pasha, and actually got some potential happiness for Martha. Now let's see if anyone else can find happiness in the final season, as difficult as that is to imagine right now."

Erik Adams of The A.V. Club gave the episode an "A" grade and wrote, "And so it's once more unto the breach for the Jennings, who can't turn down the intelligence that's turned up in the lining of Isaac Breeland's briefcase. The best family drama on TV can't deny its original reasons for being here: Philip and Elizabeth were spies first, then spouses. This new turn will test what's built up over the course of season five, commitments to kin and country reinforced between the beats of the Cold War."

Alan Sepinwall of Uproxx wrote, "Narratively, it was a season of anti-climaxes and 'To Be Continued's, which can work for some series, but seems an odd fit for a show that's traditionally been so straightforward with its storytelling. Plot and character arcs continue from season to season, but Fields and Weisberg have generally seeded each season with a handful of missions and arcs that could be paid off within that year, and that could create a sense of tension and forward momentum on a show where the primary character arc is such a slow burn. And we never really got that this year." Anthony Breznican of Entertainment Weekly wrote, "Elizabeth has an admission. 'I can't. I just can't.' Can't let go of her life as a spy — or can't let go of her life as an American?"

Mike Hale of The New York Times wrote, "The Season 5 finale of The Americans this week kept it low-key. There was some excitement early on involving Pasha's semi-faked suicide attempt, but the primary drama was more prosaic: the rise and fall of Elizabeth and Philip's plan to take themselves and their children back to the Soviet Union. First they were going and then, very abruptly, they weren't." Scott Tobias of Vulture gave the episode a perfect 5 star rating out of 5 and wrote, "The Americans leaves season five with that possibility hanging in the air, though even if Philip and their bosses accept it, it seems unlikely that he'll take a passive role in the final season. But it shows that she's looking out for his needs, allowing him to give up his active partnership in exchange for accepting her need to follow through on the mission. That's compromise. That's marriage."

Emily St. James of Vox wrote, "'The Soviet Division' balances, surprisingly nimbly, season five wrap-up with a handful of setup moments for season six, perhaps none more ominous than Renée suggesting that maybe Stan should just stick around at the FBI after all." Ed Gonzalez of Slant Magazine wrote, "For the better part of its running time, this episode is content to pick up the baton from 'The World Council of Churches,' having us waver alongside the Jenningses about where they're going to end up. Scene after scene transpires as a discussion about togetherness — as eternal ideal and currency."

Alec Bojalad of Den of Geek gave the episode a perfect 5 star rating out of 5 and wrote, "Maybe the 'real' finale will be wildly momentous and conclusive. Still, I can easily imagine a world in which many years from now my lasting memory of the entire series is the oppressive tragicness of 'The Soviet Division.'" Matt Brennan of Paste gave the episode an 8.7 out of 10 and wrote, "'The Soviet Division,' then, is the culmination of the series' defining ambition: It renders explicit the double entendre of The Americans, in which the title's playful allusion to Philip and Elizabeth's false identities has since come closer in affect to Theodore Dreiser than to John Le Carré."

=== Accolades ===
For the episode, Joel Fields and Joe Weisberg were nominated for Outstanding Writing for a Drama Series at the 68th Primetime Emmy Awards. They would lose to The Handmaid's Tale for the episode "Offred".
