= Urban Transport Planning =

- The Americans episode
- Episode no.: Season 6 Episode 3
- Directed by: Dan Attias
- Written by: Tracey Scott Wilson
- Production code: BDU603
- Original air date: April 11, 2018
- Running time: 48 minutes

Guest appearances
- Scott Cohen as Glenn Haskard; Laurie Holden as Renee; Anthony Arkin as Stavos; Darya Ekamasova as Sofia Bystrova; Yuri Kolokolnikov as Gennadi Bystrov; Alex Feldman as Fyodor Nesterenko; Greg Hildreth as Evan Urqhardt

Episode chronology
← Previous "Tchaikovsky"	Next → "Mr. and Mrs. Teacup"
- The Americans season 6

"Urban Transport Planning" is the third episode of the sixth season of the period drama television series The Americans. It originally aired on FX in the United States on April 11, 2018.

== Plot ==
Upon returning home, Elizabeth berates Paige for leaving her position during the Rennhull fiasco and notes that anyone else who had done that would be fired. After Paige leaves, Elizabeth tells Philip some of the details of her mission, including her effort to get a radiation sensor from their old contact Rennhull, but stops before telling him about Dead Hand.

Sofia tells Stan that she's discussed meeting with the FBI with her friend Bogdan at TASS, and Stan discusses the danger to both Gennadi and Sofia with Dennis. Dennis notes Rennhull's death and asks Stan if he's met with Oleg yet. Philip negotiates an extension on Henry's tuition payment and exhorts the travel agency to sell more. During a routine meeting, Elizabeth discusses her personal issues with Father Andrei, who asks her to bring Philip next time. Elizabeth then tells Paige that she is not afraid to die for her job, because she believes in what she's doing.

Stan awkwardly and apologetically meets with Oleg, who brings up both the threats made to him by the CIA after his return to the USSR and memories of Nina. Stan is nevertheless skeptical of Oleg's story about attending the transport seminar and asks Oleg not to do whatever he's there to do. Elizabeth's surveillance team (including Paige) trails Glenn Haskard and Fyodor Nesterenko to lunch, although they only discuss baseball.

Claudia, Elizabeth, and Paige cook zharkoye, a Russian stew, and (after sending Paige to get sour cream) Claudia gives Elizabeth a new target for acquiring the sensor, a warehousing/quality control supervisor at Altheon, the sensor plant, named Evan. After Elizabeth brings a sample of the zharkoye home to Philip, she and Philip discuss their very different views of the changes in Russia, such as the opening of a Moscow Pizza Hut, and Elizabeth's hatred of America and Americans. Elizabeth claims that ordinary Russians don't want to be like Americans. When Philip says that Elizabeth has not been home in 20 years and so has no idea what ordinary Russians want, she says that he has not either. Renee tells Stan that she would like to work at the FBI, but Stan tells her she is now too old to be hired as an agent.

Upon Gennadi's return to the US, Stan and three FBI teams simultaneously pick up Gennadi, Sofia, and her son Ilya to give them political asylum. Posing as a security consultant hired by Altheon, Elizabeth meets with Evan to find weaknesses in plant security procedures and then kills him when she learns Evan's girlfriend actually does work in security and would expose her cover. Philip meets Oleg in a park.

== Production ==
The episode was written by Tracey Scott Wilson and directed by Dan Attias. The episode was originally titled "The General".

== Music ==
The episode features "Dance Me to the End of Love" by Leonard Cohen.

== Reception ==
In its original American broadcast, "Urban Transport Planning" was seen by an estimated 705,000 household viewers and gained a 0.18 ratings share among adults aged 18–49, according to Nielsen Media Research.

The episode received critical acclaim. Review aggregator website Rotten Tomatoes gave it 100% "Fresh" ratings and average rating of 8.87 out of 10, based on 10 reviews, with consensus reading "Urban Transport Planning is a fine-tuned, character-driven episode that showcases a dramatic mini-reunion with heartbreaking nuance.". The A.V. Club gave the episode a 'B+' grade. Alan Sepinwall from Uproxx reviewed the episode positively as well, highlighting growing tension in the relationship of Elizabeth and Philip. Various critics at Vox reviewed the episode positively, particularly for Keri Russell's performance.
