= Jennings, Elizabeth =

- The Americans episode
- Episode no.: Season 6 Episode 9
- Directed by: Chris Long
- Written by: Joel Fields; Joe Weisberg
- Production code: BDU609
- Original air date: May 23, 2018
- Running time: 52 minutes

Guest appearances
- Kelly AuCoin as Pastor Tim; Vera Cherny as Tatiana; Peter Jacobson as Agent Wolfe; Konstantin Lavysh as Father Andrei; Alex Kuznetsov as Father Victor; Aaron Roman Weiner as Agent Brooks

Episode chronology
| ← Previous "The Summit" | Next → "START" |
- The Americans season 6

"Jennings, Elizabeth" is the ninth episode of the sixth season of the period drama television series The Americans. It originally aired on FX in the United States on May 23, 2018.

== Plot ==
While Elizabeth continues to watch over Nesterenko to stop another attempt on his life, Philip leaves a dead drop for Oleg with Elizabeth's message about the anti-Gorbachev coup plans. Stan continues to investigate the Jenningses, searching their names and Dupont Circle Travel on an FBI database (with no matches for Elizabeth and an obvious false positive for Philip), dropping in on Philip at work (and noting Elizabeth's absence), calling Pastor Tim in Buenos Aires (who does not reveal the Jennings' secret despite the aggressive nature of his questioning), and telling a skeptical Dennis about his suspicions, including William Crandall's dying comments describing the Jennings family and how Gregory Thomas had a girlfriend with beautiful hair who smoked heavily. Dennis incredulously asks Stan if he really thinks Elizabeth was Gregory Thomas's girlfriend. When Stan doesn't back down, Dennis flatly tells Stan that Philip and Elizabeth are not Soviet spies.

During his FBI interview, Father Victor states that he believes Father Andrei is associated with the KGB. Oleg picks up the dead drop, which requires him to lose his FBI tail. However, upon being notified, Dennis orders an immediate Terry stop. The FBI finds the dead drop and arrests Oleg for spying. Elizabeth remembers being instructed as a trainee not to leave a comrade to die in the streets of Moscow, despite her mission. While following Nesterenko, Elizabeth notices a suspicious woman approaching him and kills her with a silenced gunshot to the back at point-blank range; the woman turns out to be a disguised Tatiana, armed with the same type of cyanide gun, who was sent as the substitute assassin. Elizabeth escapes into the crowd.

In an FBI interview room, Oleg refuses to respond when Stan accuses him of being part of a wave of Soviet spying related to the summit. Later, in a holding cell, Oleg tells Stan that he was in the US to preserve the summit by protecting Gorbachev from a KGB coup and that Stan needs to send the encoded dead drop message to the USSR. When Stan balks, Oleg says, "You think it doesn’t matter who our leader is? This is why I’m here." After Stan says that Oleg is facing serious prison time, Oleg says he would gladly stay incarcerated if it meant a better life for his family back in Russia. Elizabeth notifies Claudia that she foiled the murder, and also informed Nesterenko's people of the assassination plot, thus foiling any future attempts on his life; Claudia expresses her indignation and sadness at Elizabeth's final betrayal. Claudia taunts her by saying that all Elizabeth has left now is Philip and their American children.

After meeting Father Andrei at a park and talking about his home life, Philip asks why Father Andrei signaled and learns that Father Victor talked to the FBI. Alarmed, Philip tersely tells Father Andrei to flee America as soon as possible, and immediately walks out of the park at normal speed, then begins running, closely followed by two FBI agents. Through a rapid change of clothes and removal of his disguise props, Philip barely avoids capture and escapes in a taxicab.

Paige confronts Elizabeth about her friend Brian's story of an intern (clearly Jackson) having been seduced by an older woman for information, which Elizabeth unconvincingly denies doing. Paige disgustedly calls Elizabeth a whore and adds that Philip can't stand to be in the same room with her. Elizabeth then erupts over the differences between Paige's privileged American life and the Jennings' impoverished Soviet ones, and Paige wordlessly leaves. Philip calls home to say that things are "topsy-turvy at the office," and Elizabeth promptly cleans out the hidden basement compartments into a "go bag" and flees the house.

== Production ==
=== Development ===
In April 2018, FX confirmed that the ninth episode of the season would be titled "Jennings, Elizabeth", and that it would be written by executive producer Joel Fields and series creator Joe Weisberg, and directed by Chris Long. This was Fields' 23rd writing credit, Weisberg's 24th writing credit, and Long's eighth directing credit.

== Reception ==
=== Viewers ===
In its original American broadcast, "Jennings, Elizabeth" was seen by an estimated 0.73 million household viewers with a 0.2 in the 18-49 demographics. This means that 0.2 percent of all households with televisions watched the episode. This was an increase in viewership from the previous episode, which was watched by 0.62 million household viewers with a 0.1 in the 18-49 demographics.

=== Critical reviews ===
"Jennings, Elizabeth" received mostly positive reviews from critics. The review aggregator website Rotten Tomatoes reported an 100% approval rating for the episode, based on 15 reviews.

Alex McLevy of The A.V. Club gave the episode an "A" grade and wrote, "It's hard to wrap my head around the fact there's only one episode left. Even with the closing cliffhanger of Elizabeth readying their escape materials following Philip's coded phone call home, even with what may well have been Claudia's final appearance, quietly eating her meal in the face of all her life's work in tatters, even with Elizabeth burning her entire network to do the right thing, it doesn't feel like we're at the end of the story. And that's the magic of this absorbing drama: Regardless of all the spywork and espionage and murder and derring-do, these are just people living out their everyday lives. If you're drawing breath, your story isn't over."

Alan Sepinwall of Uproxx wrote, "So much of 'Jennings, Elizabeth' is so thrilling that it's easy to overlook some of the more frustrating aspects of the episode, and by extension, this final season." Anthony Breznican of Entertainment Weekly wrote, "With only one more episode left in the series, there are bound to be consequences now that bring a sense of finality to a show that is bound to finally expose the Jennings family for who they really are. But what's surprising is how this episode allowed some of the major figures — especially Elizabeth — to fundamentally change who they are."
