= Persona Non Grata (The Americans) =

- The Americans episode
- Episode no.: Season 4 Episode 13
- Directed by: Chris Long
- Written by: Joel Fields; Joe Weisberg
- Cinematography by: Alex Nepomniaschy
- Editing by: Daniel Valverde
- Production code: BDU413
- Original air date: June 8, 2016
- Running time: 53 minutes

Guest appearances
- Kelly AuCoin as Pastor Tim; Vera Cherny as Tatiana Evgenyevna Vyazemtseva; Daniel Flaherty as Matthew Beeman; Peter Jacobson as Agent Wolfe; Alex Ozerov as Mischa Semenov; Cotter Smith as Deputy Attorney General; Suzy Jane Hunt as Alice; Peter Mark Kendall as Hans; Dimiter D. Marinov as Fyodor Semenov; John Schiappa as EST Leader; Frank Langella as Gabriel

Episode chronology
← Previous "A Roy Rogers in Franconia"	Next → "Amber Waves"
- The Americans season 4

"Persona Non Grata" is the thirteenth episode and season finale of the fourth season of the American period spy drama television series The Americans. It is the 52nd overall episode of the series and was written by executive producer Joel Fields and series creator Joe Weisberg, and directed by executive producer Chris Long. It was released on FX on June 8, 2016.

The series is set during the Cold War and follows Elizabeth and Philip Jennings, two Soviet KGB intelligence officers posing as an American married couple living in Falls Church, a Virginia suburb of Washington, D.C., with their American-born children Paige and Henry. It also explores the conflict between Washington's FBI office and the KGB Rezidentura there, from the perspectives of agents on both sides, including the Jennings' neighbor Stan Beeman, an FBI agent working in counterintelligence. In the episode, William faces consequences for his actions, while Gabriel worries that he might confess.

According to Nielsen Media Research, the episode was seen by an estimated 0.77 million household viewers and gained a 0.2 ratings share among adults aged 18–49. The episode received critical acclaim, with critics praising the performances, writing, and closure to the Lassa virus storyline. For the episode, Joel Fields and Joe Weisberg were nominated for Outstanding Writing for a Drama Series at the 68th Primetime Emmy Awards.

== Plot ==
William (Dylan Baker) leaves his apartment to meet with Philip (Matthew Rhys) at a park to deliver him the Lassa virus. Unbeknownst to him, Stan (Noah Emmerich) and the FBI are following him. Realizing he is being followed, William breaks the vial on his palm and infects himself as authorities approach him. Philip decides to leave the park, unaware of William's actions.

In Russia, Philip's son Mischa Semenov (Alex Ozerov) is held at a mental institution due to his anti-war statements. He is brought before an officer, who says Mischa's "powerful friends" want to help him by getting him released. He visits his grandfather, Fyodor (Dimiter D. Marinov), who gives him a package from his mother, Irina, with different passports and currencies. With this, Mischa plans to find Philip. At the Rezidentura, Oleg (Costa Ronin) tells Arkady (Lev Gorn) that while he declined Tatiana's offer, he will go back to Russia with his mother. Arkady is then summoned by Wolfe (Peter Jacobson), who accuses him of being involved in the theft of the bioweapons and Gaad's death. He declares him persona non grata for his recent actions and orders him to leave the United States within 48 hours, with Tatiana (Vera Cherny) taking over his position.

At an EST meeting, Philip opens up about his profession. Without revealing he is KGB, he expresses disdain for his job and wishes he could simply quit. William is placed on the United States Army Medical Research Institute of Infectious Diseases for treatment, and he refuses to disclose information to Stan and Aderholt (Brandon J. Dirden), as he will die in a few days. As his condition worsens, he relates how he felt privileged by his mission, but eventually became disillusioned. Gabriel (Frank Langella) worries that William could speak with the FBI, and tells Philip and Elizabeth (Keri Russell) that they should consider leaving the country.

In his deathbed, William starts coughing blood. He relates how his partner who was pretending to be his wife eventually abandoned him, something he deeply regrets. He also claims that he wanted kids "like them", not disclosing to whom he is referring. At the Beeman house, Paige (Holly Taylor) and Matthew (Daniel Flaherty) watch Super Bowl XVIII before kissing. As Philip and Elizabeth return home, Stan tells Philip that he saw Paige and Matthew kissing. An irate Philip picks up Paige, telling her not to see Matthew again, saying "You have no idea. No idea."

== Production ==
=== Development ===
In May 2016, FX confirmed that the thirteenth and final episode of the season would be titled "Persona Non Grata", and that it would be written by executive producer Joel Fields and series creator Joe Weisberg, and directed by executive producer Chris Long. This was Fields' 16th writing credit, Weisberg's 17th writing credit, and Long's third directing credit.

=== Writing ===
On bringing Mischa back to the series, executive producer Joel Fields explained, "The Mischa thing was a somewhat late-breaking and organically breaking story. When that first relationship was introduced in season 1, she brought up the idea of the son, and that blossomed through the development of that script. And then there was this question of whether he was real or not. I think how he was going to be used came into focus that season, really."

=== Filming ===
Filming for the episode and the season wrapped on March 9, 2016.

For the final scene, director Chris Long reportedly said, "I have an idea for our final image, which is to hang on the house and have it start to look like it's haunted."

== Reception ==
=== Viewers ===
In its original American broadcast, "Persona Non Grata" was seen by an estimated 0.77 million household viewers with a 0.2 in the 18-49 demographics. This means that 0.2 percent of all households with televisions watched the episode. This was a 18% decrease in viewership from the previous episode, which was watched by 0.93 million household viewers with a 0.3 in the 18-49 demographics.

=== Critical reviews ===
"Persona Non Grata" received critical acclaim. The review aggregator website Rotten Tomatoes reported an 100% approval rating for the episode, based on 22 reviews. The site's consensus states: "'Persona Non Grata' serves up new developments, additional tragedies, and unsettling reveals in a shocking season finale of The Americans."

Eric Goldman of IGN gave the episode a "great" 8.8 out of 10 and wrote in his verdict, "The Americans season finale was a very busy episode, so much so that – without as much time to breathe – it wasn't quite as impactful as the very best episodes this season. Still, from William's emotional (and wrenching) final days to the Jennings being given a big out they might not want to take, to Philip's long lost son coming back into play, there was a lot of great material here and a ton of big set-up for Season 5."

Erik Adams of The A.V. Club gave the episode an "A–" grade and wrote, "Taking place during one of the Cold War's hottest years, season four brings The Americans to a boiling point. Yet it does so without leaning too heavily on its '83 touchstones. Certain landmark events affect the characters' day-to-day, but so do David Copperfield specials, crummy computer games, and the death of someone thousands of miles away. The Americans always does good work with the stuff that appears microscopic on the historical scale, but massive on the personal level."

Alan Sepinwall of HitFix wrote, "This was a hard season, a heavy one, and easily The Americans' best so far. And when your default position is as one of the very best shows on television, that's very impressive, indeed." Anthony Breznican of Entertainment Weekly wrote, "And that's where things end — dangling off a cliff."

Mike Hale of The New York Times wrote, "The final scene captured the grim paradox of William's description: the Jenningses dream home looming over Philip and Paige in the dark, a repository of secrets, lies and deadly peril." Genevieve Koski of Vulture gave the episode a 4 star rating out of 5 and wrote, "Family can be a great source of comfort, but it can also be a huge liability. [...] Though this point has been implicit from the start of the series, 'Persona Non Grata' drives it home, in characteristically tense fashion, as it closes an excellent, particularly domestic season of The Americans."

Ben Travers of IndieWire gave the episode an "A–" grade and wrote, "The biggest tease of the final hour, though, was left unfulfilled. Gabriel told his agents they should return to Russia, effectively ending their mission, their lives and, possibly, the show. Considering the recent renewal for Seasons 5 & 6, that seems unlikely to happen, but why and how they decide what to do next remains unknown. The slow burn continues, and it will be an agonizing nine months until we find out the full weight of Philip's frustrations." Matt Brennan of Slant Magazine wrote, "'We're all Americans now,' Young Hee declared in 'Experimental Prototype City of Tomorrow,' and 'Persona Non Grata' returns to this notion by transforming it into the ultimate dilemma, built into the composition of a single, telling image."

Alec Bojalad of Den of Geek gave the episode a 4 star rating out of 5 and wrote, "The lack of resolution should be frustrating and it should be the mark of a bad finale. But it's not. 'Persona Non Grata' is a fantastic, near-perfect finale. Partly because of the sheer emotional devastation it's capable of wreaking and partly because of that lack of resolution." Amy Amatangelo of Paste gave the episode a 9.3 out of 10 and wrote, "We have no idea what the final two seasons will hold. But The Americans continues to be one of the best television series in recent history."

=== Accolades ===
For the episode, Joel Fields and Joe Weisberg were nominated for Outstanding Writing for a Drama Series at the 68th Primetime Emmy Awards. They would lose to Game of Thrones for the episode "Battle of the Bastards".
