= Comrades (The Americans) =

- The Americans episode
- Episode no.: Season 2 Episode 1
- Directed by: Thomas Schlamme
- Written by: Joel Fields; Joe Weisberg
- Production code: BDU201
- Original air date: February 26, 2014
- Running time: 45 minutes

Guest appearances
- Richard Thomas as Frank Gaad; Lev Gorn as Arkady Ivanovich; Jeremy Davidson as Emmett Connors; Natalie Gold as Leanne Connors; Tim Hopper as Sanford Prince; John Carroll Lynch as Fred; Victor Slezak as Colonel Renhull; Costa Ronin as Oleg Igorevich; Daniel London as Roy Oatway; Luke Robertson as Records Clerk; Anthony Arkin as Stavos

Episode chronology
← Previous "The Colonel"	Next → "Cardinal"
- The Americans season 2

Comrades is the second season premiere of the American television drama series The Americans, and the 14th overall episode of the series. It originally aired on February 26, 2014 in the United States on FX.

== Plot ==
KGB agent Elizabeth Jennings (Keri Russell) leaves a remote safe house to return home after recovering from her gunshot wound. As she drives down a forested road, she almost hits a doe and two fawns with her car. Meanwhile, her husband Philip Jennings (Matthew Rhys), posing as an American agent, is arranging a weapons deal with two Afghans (an elder and a young interpreter) in a Middle Eastern restaurant. The interpreter presents Philip with a knife, which he claims was used to kill his first Soviet soldier. Philip accepts the knife and then shoots both Afghans, killing the elder and wounding the interpreter. He leaves the wounded interpreter a message: no one, not even Allah, can protect them as the KGB are everywhere. As Philip attempts to leave, the interpreter attacks him. Philip kills the interpreter and then a bystanding busboy before escaping from the restaurant.

The next morning, the Jennings throw a birthday party for their son Henry (Keidrich Sellati). During the party, Philip gives his neighbor, FBI agent Stan Beeman, a refund for the trip he had arranged as a reconciliation attempt with his wife. Stan remarks that it is good to see that Philip and Elizabeth are now back together; Philip advises Stan to give his own marital relationship time. Philip and Elizabeth prepare to leave on a date, which disappoints Henry as it's his birthday. He relents when his sister Paige (Holly Taylor) expresses acceptance of their parents' need for some time alone together.

The date, however, is a cover for a mission assisting another Soviet spy couple, Emmett and Leanne Connors. Posing as Air Force security, Philip and Emmett burst into a hotel room where Elizabeth and Leanne are having sex with Roy, a Lockheed employee who is involved in a Skunk Works project. Philip and Emmett confront Roy with the suspicious circumstances of his current sexual encounter. They then offer to "protect" Roy provided he reveal his security protocols in life and at Lockheed, report future phone logs and contacts, and use the various codes they provide for his office work. Later at a construction site, Elizabeth and Leanne discuss their current lives. They are joined by Philip and Emmett, who reveal the date-mission to be a success. The two couples reminisce about their children's youth and how quickly they grow up. They decide to go to the amusement park the next day to see each other and their kids.

Paige grows increasingly suspicious of her parents' activities. Later that night, she opens their bedroom door, only to find them having mutual oral sex. After an awkward breakfast the next morning, Philip wonders if it is the first time Paige has ever checked on the couple.

At the FBI counterintelligence office, Agent Frank Gaad (Richard Thomas) orders Stan to stop being so fixated on the Illegals couple that escaped. Gaad asks Stan to trust his source, Nina (Annet Mahendru), who had claimed that the woman had died of her injuries and the man had been exfiltrated. Sanford storms into headquarters to demand his $500,000. Stan tells him he will not get his money because none of his information could be verified. Colonel Rennhull has been cleared, but Stan remains suspicious.

With the help of another FBI agent, Stan takes a bootlegged copy of The French Lieutenant's Woman for a date night with Nina. Nina is displeased with the film. She tells him of a new arrival at the Rezidentura, Oleg Igorevich Burov, who is responsible for spying on science and technology. The next day, Sanford goes to Colonel Rennhull's house and is supposedly killed by the Colonel in self-defense. At the crime scene, Stan observes the two bullet holes in Sanford's head and remarks to Gaad, "You'd think one in the head would have been enough."

At the amusement park, Emmett covertly contacts Philip and asks him to do a brush pass with an unnamed agent (John Carroll Lynch), explaining that he cannot do it himself because he might be recognized by the surveillance team following the man. He instructs Philip to use Henry as a prop that will be recognized by the agent, and will avoid alerting the surveillance team. Leanne and their children will then block for Philip. Philip is initially reluctant to involve their own children, but relents due to time pressure and carries out the task successfully.

Philip and Elizabeth go to Emmett and Leanne's hotel room to drop off the package. They are shocked to find the couple and their 15-year-old daughter, Amelia, shot dead. Philip tells Elizabeth to get their own kids, and retrieves a notebook with codes from Emmett's luggage. He walks out of the hotel room and passes by Emmett's teenage son, Jared. Philip leaves, Jared walks into the room and screams in horror.

Elizabeth and Philip frantically retrieve their kids from the park and go home. That night, Philip decodes Emmett's information and Elizabeth is extremely paranoid. Philip regrets using Henry as a prop and putting him in danger, but Elizabeth forgives him. She tells him he has to spend the night as planned with Martha, the FBI employee whom he married under another identity.

Stan comes home early from work. His wife Sandra warms up to him and asks him to go to the movies with her. Coincidentally, the film is The French Lieutenant's Woman.

The episode ends with Philip, disguised as FBI counterintelligence agent Clark, lying with Martha and talking about his job, stating that "it gets to you in ways you didn't think it would". Meanwhile, Elizabeth watches out the window anxiously.

== Production ==
The episode was written by Joel Fields and series creator Joe Weisberg and directed by Thomas Schlamme.

== Reception ==
Comrades received critical acclaim. The A.V. Club gave the episode a perfect A grade. Also, Eric Goldman of IGN rated the episode 8.5/10 stating; 'The Americans returned with a strong premiere that quickly raised the stakes.' Writing in The Atlantic, Spencer Kornhaber observed that the episode "raises the FX series' stakes by making its secret agents face a universal fear", namely about the safety of their own children.
