= Mr. and Mrs. Teacup =

- The Americans episode
- Episode no.: Season 6 Episode 4
- Directed by: Roxann Dawson
- Written by: Peter Ackerman
- Production code: BDU604
- Original air date: April 18, 2018
- Running time: 48 minutes

Guest appearances
- Scott Cohen as Glenn Haskard; Julia Garner as Kimberly Breland; Lev Gorn as Arkady Ivanovich; Boris Krutonog as Igor Burov; Miriam Shor as Erica Haskard; Anthony Arkin as Stavos; Alex Feldman as Fyodor Nesterenko

Episode chronology
← Previous "Urban Transport Planning"	Next → "The Great Patriotic War"
- The Americans season 6

"Mr. and Mrs. Teacup" is the fourth episode of the sixth season of the period drama television series The Americans. It originally aired on FX in the United States on April 18, 2018.

== Plot ==
Oleg tells Philip about the split over Gorbachev within the KGB's leadership. When Philip insists that Elizabeth would never act to hurt the USSR, Oleg explains that trait is what would make her useful to the anti-Gorbachev faction. Elizabeth tries to steal the radiation sensor from the Altheon shipping warehouse, but does not get it and has to shoot three security guards to escape. When Elizabeth and Paige return home to debrief, Philip tries to tell Paige what actually happened in the Rennhull fiasco, but Elizabeth cuts him off. After Philip leaves, Paige suggests sleeping with a young Congressional intern named Brian to get information, but Elizabeth says that the Soviets intend for Paige to work in the State Department or similar federal agency, not do that kind of work.

While picking up a recording of Kimmy's father (head of the CIA's Soviet group), "Jim" (Philip) learns that Kimmy (now a junior at the University of Michigan) is going to Greece for Thanksgiving and won't be home again before the summit. When Philip gives the tape to Elizabeth, the Jennings discuss their agreement about Paige and Henry. On the tape, Elizabeth hears the Americans mention a source inside the Soviets. Claudia tells Elizabeth about Gennadi and Sofia's defection and says that he needs to be dealt with before the USA can use Gennadi (an ex-Soviet hockey star) for publicity. Later, Elizabeth assigns Marilyn (without using "Julie" [Paige]) to tail Stan to locate Gennadi and Sofia.

Philip tells a deflated Henry that they might not be able to afford his private-school tuition for the next year because business at the travel agency had not increased as expected. Later, Philip tells Elizabeth about the travel agency's financial problems; she suggests that he terminate some of his staff. He also discusses with Stan (at a bar) why Americans want more instead of being content; Stan replies with his father's quote, "The more you want, the more you get." Dennis tells Stan that both Gennadi and Sofia (now codenamed as "Mr. and Mrs. Teacup" since their defection) have asked to meet with him and that their relocation agents will let him do so. Oleg calls his father to send a coded message to Arkady; when he receives the message, Arkady tells Igor that Oleg agreed to this mission (despite its danger) because he wanted to make a difference. Paige sleeps with Brian and eyes his security pass afterward.

Erica tells "Stephanie" (Elizabeth) that she intended to be remembered through her art but now wishes she had spent more time with Glenn. "Stephanie" convinces Erica to go to a World Series viewing party with Glenn because Nesterenko will be there, and Elizabeth secretly has a "bug" planted in Glenn's jacket. However, Erica becomes nauseated shortly after arriving, and the bug picks up no information before they leave. While going over the travel agency finances, Philip stares at a sandwich and remembers starving in the USSR as a boy, scraping a meal at the back of a diner from food stuck to pans.

== Production ==
The episode was written by Peter Ackerman and directed by Roxann Dawson.

== Reception ==
In its original American broadcast, "Mr. and Mrs. Teacup" was seen by an estimated 569,000 household viewers and gained a 0.13 ratings share among adults aged 18–49, according to Nielsen Media Research.

Review aggregator website Rotten Tomatoes gave it 100% "Fresh" ratings and average rating of 9.08 out of 10, based on 11 reviews, with consensus reading "Mr. and Mrs. Teacup shakes up allegiances between friends, enemies, and even family members as a spy vs. spy conflict begins to solidify at the center of an already outrageous arc.". The A.V. Club gave the episode a 'B+' grade.
