= The Summit (The Americans) =

- The Americans episode
- Episode no.: Season 6 Episode 8
- Directed by: Sylvain White
- Written by: Joshua Brand
- Production code: BDU608
- Original air date: May 16, 2018
- Running time: 56 minutes

Guest appearances
- Austin Abrams as Jackson Barber; Scott Cohen as Glenn Haskard; Laurie Holden as Renee; Miriam Shor as Erica Haskard; Anthony Arkin as Stavos; Aaron Roman Weiner as Agent Brooks

Episode chronology
← Previous "Harvest"	Next → "Jennings, Elizabeth"
- The Americans season 6

"The Summit" is the eighth episode of the sixth season of the period drama television series The Americans. It originally aired on FX in the United States on May 16, 2018.

== Plot ==
When Elizabeth arrives home from visiting Paige, Philip tells a furious Elizabeth that he has been reporting on her activities as requested by someone from "back home" (Oleg), who claimed that she has been working for a cabal that is trying to overthrow Gorbachev and the Soviet government. Elizabeth becomes especially angry when Philip tells her that she needs to think about what she is doing. The FBI believes that the Russian Orthodox priest Father Victor may be a spy and calls him in for a meeting. However, the witnesses' descriptions of the Chicago illegals do not match the drawings that the FBI has from its previous illegals incidents. Gorbachev arrives in the USA. Elizabeth tells Claudia that Nesterenko has a solo meeting set up with the US negotiators.

After Glenn's attempt to kill a suffering Erica by overdose failed, "Stephanie" kills her by making her choke on her own vomit. Glenn tells "Stephanie" that he left the negotiating team over Erica's illness and offers her one of Erica's pictures, which she takes and burns. Renee gets a job interview at the FBI; Stan says they would want to know if she is a loyal American and can keep secrets. To tape Nesterenko's meeting without Glenn there, Elizabeth (as "Wendy") seduces Jackson, the congressional intern, and has him unwittingly plant a box of documents containing a recording device in the room. Stan takes a picture of Elizabeth to Curtis, one of Gregory's people, who doesn't recognize her but remembers that the woman smoked constantly.

When "Wendy" has Jackson bring her the planted box, he challenges her story and reveals that he found the planted recording device. Elizabeth allows him to leave her car without harm, even though he claims not to understand her instructions. On the tape, Elizabeth hears Nesterenko discuss Gorbachev's vision of a nuclear-free world, without saying anything against the interests of the USSR. Philip goes to Stavos's apartment to apologize; Stavos says that he always suspected something irregular was going on with the travel agency, even though he never called the police.

Claudia orders Elizabeth to kill Nesterenko immediately with a cyanide gun, but she does not, although she has a chance. Instead, Elizabeth returns and demands an explanation from Claudia, who admits to being part of a Center plot to overthrow Gorbachev, which would then be advanced by falsifying Elizabeth's reports on Nesterenko. Elizabeth refuses to continue as a part of it. Philip rents and watches a Russian movie. Returning home, Elizabeth tells Philip to contact Oleg to confirm the anti-Gorbachev plot and also asks Philip to take a meeting with Father Andrei tomorrow while she watches over Nesterenko.

== Production ==
The episode was written by Joshua Brand, and directed by Sylvain White. The movie that Philip rents and watches is the 1980 Soviet/Russian comedy The Garage.

== Reception ==
In its original American broadcast, "The Summit" was seen by an estimated 620,000 household viewers and gained a 0.13 ratings share among adults aged 18–49, according to Nielsen Media Research.

The episode received positive reviews. Review aggregator website Rotten Tomatoes gave the episode 100% "Fresh" ratings and average rating of 8.76 out of 10, based on 12 reviews, with consensus reading, "The Americans takes a gripping path in the typically well-acted The Summit as tensions mount, loyalties are further tested, and a central relationship reaches a breaking point – as well as a potential turning point." Alan Sepinwall from Uproxx praised the episode, highlighting Elizabeth's transformation saying, "It’s a remarkable transformation, and an example of the series’ patient-bordering-on-excruciating pacing paying off in spades." The A.V. Club rated the episode 'A−'.
