= Joe Weisberg =

American television writer (born 1960s)

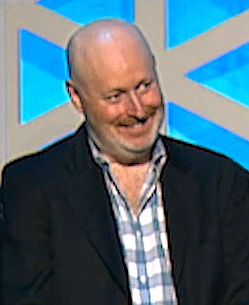
- Weisberg at the Peabody Awards 2019
- Born: Joseph Weisberg; 1965 or 1966 (age 60–61)
- Education: Yale University
- Occupations: Writer; producer; educator; CIA officer
- Television: The Americans
- Relatives: Lois Weisberg (mother); Jacob Weisberg (brother)
- Awards: Primetime Emmy Award for Outstanding Writing for a Drama Series

Joseph Weisberg (born 1965/1966) is an American television writer, producer, novelist, and school teacher. Weisberg is best known as the creator and showrunner of the FX TV series The Americans and The Patient (co-created with Joel Fields).

== Career ==
A 1987 graduate of Yale University, Weisberg became a CIA officer three years after graduation, and after a short career with the Agency, Weisberg taught at The Summit School, a private special education high school in Jamaica Estates, Queens, New York City, until 2010 when he went on to pursue a career in television. One of his final projects at Summit School was helping students found the school newspaper, The Summit Sun.

Weisberg wrote episodes for the TNT alien invasion series Falling Skies and the DirecTV legal drama Damages. He then created The Americans, an FX series centering on two KGB sleeper agents, who pose as American citizens in Washington, D.C. during the 1980s. The Americans was executive-produced by Weisberg and Justified creator Graham Yost. In 2022, Weisberg co-created and showran the limited FX series The Patient.

Weisberg authored two novels: 10th Grade and An Ordinary Spy. An Ordinary Spy was nominated for the Believer Book Award.

Weisberg is also the author of the non-fiction book Russia Upside Down: An Exit Strategy for the Second Cold War, which was published in 2021.

== Personal life ==
Weisberg grew up in a Jewish family in Chicago, the son of civil rights attorney Bernard Weisberg and former Commissioner of Cultural Affairs Lois Weisberg. He is the younger brother of Slate Group editor-in-chief Jacob Weisberg.

In 2024, Weisberg and The Americans co-showrunner Joel Fields signed an open letter by more than 1,000 Jewish creatives and professionals denouncing Jonathan Glazer's acceptance speech for The Zone of Interest at the 96th Academy Awards, in which Glazer had criticized Israel's actions during the Gaza war, as well as the Israeli occupation of Palestinian Territories.

== Filmography ==
=== Falling Skies ===
- "Silent Kill" (1.05)
- "Mutiny" (1.09)
- "Love and Other Acts of Courage" (2.05)

=== Damages ===
- "Next One's on Me, Blondie" (4.04)

=== The Americans ===
- "Pilot" (1.01)
- "The Clock" (1.02)
- "In Control" (co-written with Joel Fields) (1.04)
- "Mutually Assured Destruction" (co-written with Joel Fields) (1.08)
- "The Colonel" (co-written with Joel Fields) (1.13)
- "Comrades" (co-written with Joel Fields) (2.01)
- "Cardinal" (co-written with Joel Fields) (2.02)
- "Operation Chronicle" (co-written with Joel Fields) (2.12)
- "Echo" (co-written with Joel Fields) (2.13)
- "EST Men" (co-written with Joel Fields) (3.01)
- "Baggage" (co-written with Joel Fields) (3.02)
- "Stingers" (co-written with Joel Fields) (3.10)
- "March 8, 1983" (co-written with Joel Fields) (3.13)
- "Glanders" (co-written with Joel Fields) (4.01)
- "Pastor Tim" (co-written with Joel Fields) (4.02)
- "Roy Rogers in Franconia" (co-written with Joel Fields) (4.12)
- "Persona Non Grata" (co-written with Joel Fields) (4.13)
- "Amber Waves" (co-written with Joel Fields) (5.01)
- "Pests" (co-written with Joel Fields) (5.02)
- "The World Council of Churches" (co-written with Joel Fields) (5.12)
- "The Soviet Division" (co-written with Joel Fields) (5.13)
- "Dead Hand" (co-written with Joel Fields) (6.01)
- "Tchaikovsky" (co-written with Joel Fields) (6.02)
- "Jennings, Elizabeth" (co-written with Joel Fields) (6.09)
- "START" (co-written with Joel Fields) (6.10)

=== The Patient ===
- All 10 episodes (co-written with Joel Fields)

== Bibliography ==
- 10th Grade. Random House. 2002. ISBN 978-0375505843.
- An Ordinary Spy. Bloomsbury USA. 2008. ISBN 978-1596913769.
- Russia Upside Down: An Exit Strategy for the Second Cold War. PublicAffairs. 2021. ISBN 978-1541768628.

=== Accolades ===
Year	Award	Category	Nominee(s)	Result	Ref.
2022	Peabody Awards	Entertainment	The Patient	Nominated	
