= The Colonel (The Americans) =

- The Americans episode
- Episode no.: Season 1 Episode 13
- Directed by: Adam Arkin
- Written by: Joel Fields; Joe Weisberg
- Production code: BDU112
- Original air date: May 1, 2013
- Running time: 47 minutes

Guest appearances
- Richard Thomas as Frank Gaad; Annet Mahendru as Nina; Alison Wright as Martha Hanson; Susan Misner as Sandra Beeman; Lev Gorn as Arkady Ivanovich; Tim Hopper as Sanford Prince; Paul Fitzgerald as Richard Patterson; Margo Martindale as Claudia; Daniel Flaherty as Matthew Beeman; Victor Slezak as Colonel Rennhull; Anthony Arkin as Stavos; Aaron Roman Weiner; Jakob Von Eichel as Vadim

Episode chronology
← Previous "The Oath"	Next → "Comrades"
- The Americans season 1

"The Colonel" is the thirteenth episode and the season finale of the first season of the period drama television series The Americans. It originally aired on FX in the United States on May 1, 2013.

== Plot ==
After being arrested for not paying his child support, Sanford Prince (Tim Hopper) is in FBI custody. Stan Beeman (Noah Emmerich) tells his boss, Agent Frank Gaad (Richard Thomas), that they should keep Prince in custody until he talks.

Elizabeth (Keri Russell) meets Claudia (Margo Martindale) where she reaffirms her suspicions about the upcoming meeting with an informant, Colonel Lyle Rennhull, especially now that Prince, who had arranged the connection, has been moved to federal custody. She also tells Claudia about a meeting between Caspar Weinberger and James Baker—information she learned from the bug planted in Weinberger's study (which the FBI are now aware of). Claudia tells her she will not be their handler for very long after Elizabeth and Philip (Matthew Rhys) requested for her to be transferred.

Elizabeth meets Philip at their office, where she continues to question the authenticity of the Colonel. She tells Philip that if the meeting is a set-up, he needs to leave with their children for Canada, knowing that she will be identified by Stan immediately. Philip volunteers to take the mission with the Colonel, but Elizabeth declines and tells him he instead needs to go and collect the tape that recorded Weinberger's meeting with Baker. Meanwhile, Arkady (Lev Gorn) tells Nina (Annet Mahendru) that Moscow has decided to let her live, despite reservations. Gaad plans to arrest the KGB agent who arrives to collect the Weinberger tape.

Stan tries to reconcile with his wife Sandra (Susan Misner) by offering a vacation to Jamaica, but she has not forgiven him. Down in the basement, Elizabeth listens to an old tape of her mother speaking fondly about pictures she had seen of her grandchildren Paige (Holly Taylor) and Henry (Keidrich Sellati).

A disguised Claudia persuades Richard Patterson (Paul Fitzgerald), the CIA official responsible for the killing of General Zhukov, to let her use his phone. She tasers him, injects him with paralyzing agent, and cuts his jugular. She tells the dying Patterson about her friendship with Zhukov. Paige, awakened by a nightmare, catches Elizabeth coming out of their laundry room. Elizabeth claims she was folding clothes, but Paige is suspicious.

Claudia tries to convince Arkady to call off the meeting with the Colonel, but he declines, saying that it's a risk worth taking. Stan reassures Nina that her exfiltration will be approved by the end of the day. Elizabeth gets a note from Philip, telling her that he is taking the meeting with the Colonel. Nina tells Arkady that the FBI are planning something and he assumes the meeting with the Colonel is a trap. To alert the agents, Arkady dispatches cars with an "abort" signal spray-painted on the side.

Philip meets Colonel Rennhull, with Claudia watching. Rennhull provides him with schematics that he says are 50 years away from being possible. Claudia spots a car with the abort signal and interrupts Philip's meeting with Rennhull. When no FBI agents intervene, they realize it is Elizabeth's mission that is compromised. Elizabeth makes her way towards a car to collect the tape of the recording from the bug, but Philip arrives and collects her. Stan recognizes them as the couple that kidnapped Patterson and FBI agents intervene, shooting at Philip and Elizabeth. Phiilip loses the pursuers, but Elizabeth has been shot. Stan returns to Nina, where he tells her that his mission failed and she cannot be exfiltrated yet. Later, while Elizabeth is getting surgery for her gunshot wound, Philip asks Stan to take care of the children, telling him that Elizabeth has to take care of a great-aunt, and that Philip is obliged to go with her.

In a montage played to Peter Gabriel's "Games Without Frontiers", Martha (Alison Wright) happily puts on her wedding ring after coming home; Sanford is now talking to Gaad about Rennhull; Nina hands Arkady a file on Stan; Paige and Henry are at the Beemans' while their parents are gone.

Elizabeth wakes up and tells Philip to come home in Russian. Back home, curious about her mother's behavior, Paige looks around the laundry room, but sees nothing out of the ordinary.

== Production ==
=== Development ===
In April 2013, FX confirmed that the thirteenth episode of the series would be titled "The Colonel", and that it would be written by executive producer Joel Fields and series creator Joe Weisberg, and directed by Adam Arkin. This was Fields' fourth writing credit, Weisberg's fifth writing credit, and Arkin's third directing credit.

== Reception ==
=== Viewers ===
In its original American broadcast, "The Colonel" was seen by an estimated 1.74 million household viewers with a 0.6 in the 18–49 demographics. This means that 0.6 percent of all households with televisions watched the episode. This was a 16% increase in viewership from the previous episode, which was watched by 1.49 million household viewers with a 0.5 in the 18–49 demographics.

=== Critical reviews ===
"The Colonel" received critical acclaim. Eric Goldman of IGN gave the episode an "amazing" 9.5 out of 10 and wrote, "The Americans ended its first season with a terrifically exciting episode, putting Philip and Elizabeth in greater danger than ever and setting up plenty to deal with in Season 2."

Emily St. James of The A.V. Club gave the episode an "A" grade and wrote, "It's a beautiful setup for season two, but I'd also argue it's a perfect ending to season one, which was, at its heart, a season about two people finding a way to express the inexpressible, to realize how deeply they needed each other. And in three words, the show found a way to do just that."

Alan Sepinwall of HitFix wrote, "Not a bad way to go into the hiatus, by any means, but the show set a very high bar over the last three months, and ideally the finale goes well above that." Matt Zoller Seitz of Vulture gave the episode a 4 star rating out of 5 and wrote, "'The Colonel' rings down the curtain on a strong first season of The Americans, maybe the best freshman outing I've seen since season one of Homeland."

James Donaghy of The Guardian wrote, "It was intensely emotional at times and there were dicey moments but despite everyone's best efforts none of the major players died in this breathless finale. That was something of a surprise but it leaves us with a strong line-up for when it returns next year." Carla Day of TV Fanatic gave the episode a 4.8 star rating out of 5 and wrote, "The Americans season 1 played like a well-paced 13-episode film. It had everything you want in an outstanding drama: tension, thrills, emotion, love, trust, betrayal, action, and more. It will be a long wait for next season."
