= Chris Long (director) =

English television director & producer

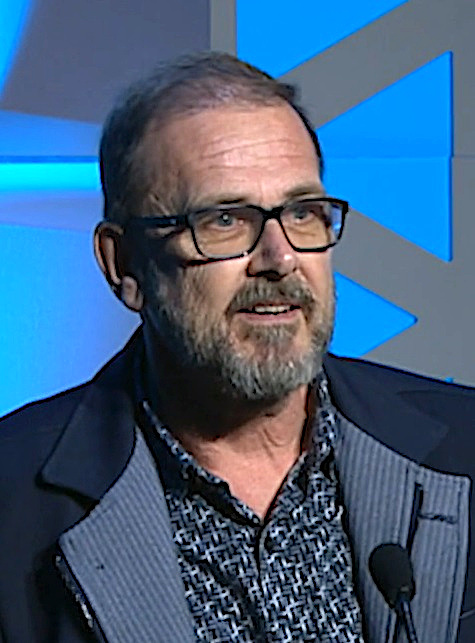
Chris Long at the Peabody Awards 2019

Chris Long is an English television producer and director.

He was lead director and executive producer on The Americans. He was the director and executive producer on Suspicion. This was his second series for Apple, having directed and executive produced the first episode of Amazing Stories. In 2019 he also directed the pilot episode of The Right Stuff.

== Filmography ==
=== As a director ===
- Lois & Clark: The New Adventures of Superman (1996)
- Gilmore Girls (2001)
- Smallville (2001)
- Weeds (2006)
- Supernatural (2006)
- The Mentalist (2008)
- Jonas (2009)
- Charmed (2001–2003)
- A Tale of Two Thieves (2014)
- The Americans (2016–2018)
- The Man in the High Castle (2016)
- Amazing Stories (2020)
- The Right Stuff (2020)
- Suspicion (2022)
- The Patient (2022)

=== As a producer ===
- Timecop (1997)
- Gilmore Girls (2003–2004)
- Dirt (2007–2008)
- The Mentalist (2008–2015)
- A Tale of Two Thieves (2014)
- The Americans (2016–2018)
- Suspicion (2022)
- The Patient (2022)

=== Accolades ===
Year	Award	Category	Nominee(s)	Result	Ref.
2022	Peabody Awards	Entertainment	The Patient	Nominated	
