= The Americans season 3 =

The Americans
- Season 3
- DVD cover
- No. of episodes: 13

Release
- Original network: FX
- Original release: January 28 – April 22, 2015

Season chronology
- ← Previous; Season 2 Next → Season 4

The third season of the American television drama series The Americans, consisting of 13 episodes, premiered on FX on January 28, 2015, and concluded on April 22, 2015. The series was renewed for the third season on April 16, 2014.

The events of the third season begin in late 1982 and end on March 8, 1983, the night of Ronald Reagan's Evil Empire speech.

== Cast ==
=== Main ===
- Keri Russell as Elizabeth Jennings (Nadezhda), a KGB officer
- Matthew Rhys as Philip Jennings (Mischa), a KGB officer
- Lev Gorn as Arkady Ivanovich Zotov, the KGB's Resident
- Annet Mahendru as Nina Sergeevna Krilova, Beeman's Soviet mole
- Susan Misner as Sandra Beeman, Stan's wife
- Costa Ronin as Oleg Igorevich Burov, a KGB officer and head of technology at the Washington Rezidentura
- Keidrich Sellati as Henry Jennings, Elizabeth and Philip's son
- Holly Taylor as Paige Jennings, Elizabeth and Philip's daughter
- Richard Thomas as Frank Gaad, special agent in charge of the FBI Counterintelligence Division
- Alison Wright as Martha Hanson, Gaad's secretary and Philip's informant
- Noah Emmerich as Stan Beeman, an FBI agent, and the Jennings' neighbor

=== Recurring ===
- Frank Langella as Gabriel, one of Philip and Elizabeth's KGB handlers
- Brandon J. Dirden as Dennis Aderholt, an FBI agent
- Vera Cherny as Tatiana Evgenyevna Vyazemtseva, a KGB officer working at the Rezidentura
- Peter Mark Kendall as Hans, a South African graduate student and KGB informant being trained by Elizabeth
- Svetlana Efremova as Zinaida Preobrazhenskaya, a defector from the Institute for US and Canadian Studies
- Karen Pittman as Lisa, a Northrop employee from whom Elizabeth is gleaning information
- Kelly AuCoin as Pastor Tim, the head of a church Paige Jennings attends
- Julia Garner as Kimberly Breland, the daughter of the head of the CIA's Afghan group
- Rahul Khanna as Yousaf Rana, an officer in the Pakistani ISI Covert Action Division
- Michael Aronov as Anton Baklanov, a scientist involved in stealth technology
- Jefferson Mays as Walter Taffet, an officer for the Office of Professional Responsibility
- Gillian Alexy as Annelise, an informant of Philip's
- Daniel Flaherty as Matthew Beeman, Stan's son
- Callie Thorne as Tori, a woman Stan meets at EST
- Margo Martindale as Claudia, one of Philip and Elizabeth's KGB handlers
- Reg Rogers as Charles Duluth, a journalist and KGB source
- Peter Von Berg as Vasili Nikolaevich, a former KGB Resident
- Katja Herbers as Evi Sneijder, Nina's cellmate

== Production ==
Lev Gorn, who portrays Arkady Ivanovich, was promoted to series regular for the third season, after having a recurring role throughout the first two seasons. Additionally, Costa Ronin and Richard Thomas were promoted from recurring status to series regulars. In October 2014, Frank Langella was cast in a recurring role. Filming for the season began in October 2014. Co-star Noah Emmerich directed the seventh episode of the season, marking his directorial debut.

== Episodes ==
No. overall	No. in season	Title	Directed by	Written by	Original release date	Prod. code	US viewers (millions)
27	1	"EST Men"	Daniel Sackheim	Joel Fields & Joe Weisberg	January 28, 2015	BDU301	1.90
Elizabeth meets with an ex-CIA agent, who gives her a list of operatives, but regrets her actions a few minutes later. The former agent tries to keep Elizabeth at the restaurant but Elizabeth senses something is wrong and departs just as cars race to the restaurant. Agents start searching and Elizabeth is approached by Gaad and another agent. There is a fight in which they are all injured and she loses the list. She and Philip meet with their mentor Gabriel, who is in favor of recruiting Paige. Philip is opposed to the idea and argues with Elizabeth. Annelise tells Philip that she is in love with Yousaf; Philip asks her to still get information from him. While having sex with Yousaf, she confesses her motives for being with him, and he strangles her to death. Philip arrives and offers to help Yousaf by disposing of Annelise's body. Stan attends an EST meeting, but decides that the program is stupid.
28	2	"Baggage"	Daniel Sackheim	Joel Fields & Joe Weisberg	February 4, 2015	BDU302	0.92
Philip and Elizabeth dispose of Annelise's body. Her death deeply affects Philip as they consider recruiting Paige. Nina has been arrested for treason and is in a Moscow prison cell, which she shares with a Belgian woman who claims to be innocent. Oleg is furious with Stan for Nina's arrest and confronts him in alley with a gun, but lets him walk away. Stan contacts Sandra, hoping to visit his son. Gaad puts Stan in charge of Zinaida, a defector from the Institute for US and Canadian Studies.
29	3	"Open House"	Thomas Schlamme	Stuart Zicherman	February 11, 2015	BDU303	1.02
In disguise, Philip and Elizabeth are able to put a listening device in a CIA agent's mobile phone, hoping to figure out how to get the list of operatives. They are in danger of being spotted by the FBI and CIA, since they must follow the signal in their car. Elizabeth is followed and is nearly caught, but the KGB stages an automobile accident with one of the CIA's tailing cars and she escapes. At home, the pain from the previous attack becomes unbearable for her, and Philip extracts some of her broken teeth. At the rezidentura, Oleg struggles with remaining in America or returning to Russia but decides to stay.
30	4	"Dimebag"	Thomas Schlamme	Peter Ackerman	February 18, 2015	BDU304	0.97
Kimmy, the teenage daughter of the head of the CIA's Afghan group, is employed as a babysitter by the agent whose phone was bugged by Philip. Philip is tasked with working her for information and access. Nina is pressured to get a confession from her cellmate, Evi. Stan publicly voices his opinion at an EST meeting and is asked out on a date by a woman named Tori. Paige asks her family to invite Pastor Tim and his wife to dinner for her birthday. During the meal Paige reveals that she wants to be baptized, and the visitors support her. Philip and Elizabeth realize Paige ambushed them with the request and invited her guests for support.
31	5	"Salang Pass"	Kevin Dowling	Stephen Schiff	February 25, 2015	BDU305	0.81
Kimmy invites Philip to her house on a night that her parents will be away. Gabriel supplies him with Afghani marijuana and gives him advice about gleaning information from her, and about recruiting Paige. Philip finds an attaché case belonging to Kimmy's father and inspects it so he can plant a listening device later. Paige wants a new baptismal dress and Philip offers to take her shopping. Elizabeth causes the death of a Northrop employee, which leads to a better company job for Lisa as his replacement. Stan asks Oleg's help to find out if Zinaida is a Russian spy posing as a defector. If she is, Stan plans to use her as a bargaining chip to obtain Nina's release.
32	6	"Born Again"	Kevin Dowling	Tracey Scott Wilson	March 4, 2015	BDU306	0.93
Paige gets baptized by Pastor Tim, with Philip and Elizabeth in attendance. Tori and Stan have dinner at the Jennings house. Stan admits that he still considers Sandra his wife, but has sex with Tori. Gabriel informs Philip that Philip's son from a previous relationship is now a soldier in Afghanistan. Philip increases his visits with Kimmy to check the phone taps. Kimmy tries to seduce Philip. Nina acts vulnerable to get Evi to confess about her boyfriend's treason. Evi gets taken away and Nina gets rewarded with a meal.
33	7	"Walter Taffet"	Noah Emmerich	Lara Shapiro	March 11, 2015	BDU307	1.22
Philip confronts Elizabeth about her conversation with Paige about their earlier activism in the civil rights movement. Gaad discovers the microtransmitter planted by Martha and the bureau starts hunting for a mole. Martha's distress worries Philip. Stan shares a bonding story with his son. Paige begins to explore the history of racial discrimination. Philip tells Elizabeth about his secret son Mischa.
34	8	"Divestment"	Dan Attias	Joshua Brand	March 18, 2015	BDU308	1.13
Philip, Elizabeth, and Reuben abduct two men who were planning to stage attacks and blame them on the anti-Apartheid movement. One is Todd, an undergraduate feigning interest in the anti-apartheid movement, and the other is Eugene Venter, a South African intelligence officer. Reuben violently executes Venter, but Todd is spared when he gives them the location of a bomb he was unable to detonate. OPR Investigator Walter Taffet begins questioning Gaad's staff, including Martha, who realizes that "Clark" (Philip) does not work for the OPR as he claimed. Elizabeth asks Gabriel's help in getting Philip's son off the front lines in Afghanistan. Nina is given a reduced sentence, with the possibility of a full pardon if she can get Russian physicist Anton Baklonov to increase his productivity. She also meets Vasil, the former Rezident, who has yet to forgive her.
35	9	"Do Mail Robots Dream of Electric Sheep?"	Stephen Williams	Joshua Brand	March 25, 2015	BDU309	0.99
Elizabeth tells Hans that Todd saw him at the site where Venter was killed. Fearful of being excluded from further operations, Hans finds Todd and kills him. Martha, who seems determined to act as if nothing has happened, informs Philip that the FBI's Mail Robot has been sent for repairs after a tense Agent Gaad kicked and broke it. Philip and Elizabeth go to the repair facility to install a recording device inside the Mail Robot and are discovered there by Betty, who had come in to work on the business's books in the middle of the night. The repair facility was started by her late husband and is run by her son. Betty tells Elizabeth about her life and family; moved by Betty's openness, Elizabeth reveals that she is a Russian spy and allows Betty, who now knows she will be killed, to overdose on her heart medication. Stan and Oleg reach a tentative agreement to use Zinaida's possible status as a Soviet mole to secure Nina's freedom.
36	10	"Stingers"	Larysa Kondracki	Joel Fields & Joe Weisberg	April 1, 2015	BDU310	0.90
In a movie theater's bathroom, Zinaida is shown leaving a message, confirming that she is a spy. In the Russian factory, Anton tells Nina that he needs photographs to aid his work. After retrieving a tape from Kimmy's father, Philip and Elizabeth learn that Pakistan's ISI Agency is sending someone to the U.S. to discuss U.S. involvement in Afghanistan. Elizabeth checks into the hotel where the meeting is planned. Henry and Stan bond over films and games, as Paige, at Pastor Tim's urging, confronts her parents about their secrecy. They confess to being Russian spies but caution her about telling anyone. During his interview with Agent Taffet Stan develops a suspicion about Martha but keeps it to himself.
37	11	"One Day in the Life of Anton Baklanov"	Andrew Bernstein	Stephen Schiff & Tracey Scott Wilson	April 8, 2015	BDU311	1.04
As pressure mounts, Martha expresses worry over her interview with agent Taffet. Paige struggles to adjust to her new knowledge about Philip and Elizabeth's real identities. Gabriel informs Elizabeth that her mother is close to death. Philip demands Gabriel arrange for Elizabeth to visit her mother. Elizabeth seduces the hotel manager to gain his confidence. Lisa's husband begins to interfere in the operation to get photographs from inside Northrop. Anton Baklanov begins to become emotionally attached to Nina. Elizabeth flirts with the hotel manager in his office and gathers intel on the Afghanis. Aroused, she returns to Philip having declined the hotel manager.
38	12	"I Am Abassin Zadran"	Christopher Misiano	Peter Ackerman & Stuart Zicherman	April 15, 2015	BDU312	0.98
Paige leaves a note saying that she will be staying overnight at Pastor Tim's house, but Philip and Elizabeth confront her and bring her home. Agent Aderholt confronts Stan about Nina. Elizabeth oversees a mission with Lisa to get photographs from inside Northrop. Paige expresses more frustration and her parents decide that she should travel with Elizabeth to see Elizabeth's dying mother in Russia. Philip and Elizabeth pose as CIA agents to manipulate Abassin Zadran, an Afghanistan mujahideen commander, who murders his colleagues, sabotaging the meeting with American intelligence. A suspicious Stan visits Martha at home. He leaves learning nothing but Martha becomes frantic and Philip removes his disguise to reveal his true appearance.
39	13	"March 8, 1983"	Daniel Sackheim	Joel Fields & Joe Weisberg	April 22, 2015	BDU313	1.22
Against Gabriel's wishes, Elizabeth and Paige travel to Germany to visit Elizabeth's mother. Elizabeth believes the trip helped Paige understand, but Paige becomes more fearful. Philip kills the FBI's computer expert, Gene, and stages the death to look like suicide, hoping this will bring an end to the search for a mole. Stan tells Gaad about his plan to get Nina released by trading information that Zinaida is a spy. The plan fails and Gaad recommends that Stan be fired, but the FBI wants Stan to continue working with Russian agents. Philip welcomes his wife and daughter home. He discusses his disillusionment arising from Gene’s killing with Elizabeth, who gets distracted by Ronald Reagan's televised "Evil Empire speech". Meanwhile, a distraught Paige calls Pastor Tim to tell him that her parents are Russian spies.

== Reception ==
=== Critical response ===
The third season received widespread critical acclaim. On Rotten Tomatoes, it received a 100% approval rating, with an average score of 9/10 based on 53 reviews. The critical consensus reads: "Family-driven drama and psychological themes propel The Americans' tautly drawn tension, dispensing thrills of a different ilk this season." On Metacritic, it scored 92 out of 100 based on 23 reviews.

=== Accolades ===
The series was given a 2014 Peabody Award, with the organization stating, "In this ingenious, addictive cliffhanger, Reagan-era Soviet spies—married with children and a seemingly endless supply of wigs—operate out of a lovely 3BR home in a suburb of Washington, D.C. Between their nail-biter missions (and sometimes in the midst of them), the series contemplates duty, honor, parental responsibility, fidelity, both nationalistic and marital, and what it means to be an American."

For the 5th Critics' Choice Television Awards, it won for Best Drama Series and received three acting nominations—Keri Russell for Best Actress in a Drama Series, Matthew Rhys for Best Actor in a Drama Series, and Lois Smith for Best Guest Performer in a Drama Series. For the 31st TCA Awards, the series was nominated for Program of the Year, Rhys was nominated for Individual Achievement in Drama, and it won for Outstanding Achievement in Drama.

For the 67th Primetime Emmy Awards, Margo Martindale won for Outstanding Guest Actress in a Drama series after her third consecutive nomination, and Joshua Brand was nominated for Outstanding Writing for a Drama Series for "Do Mail Robots Dream of Electric Sheep?".

For the 68th Writers Guild of America Awards, the series was nominated for Best Drama Series.

== Home media releases ==
The third season was released on DVD in region 1 on March 1, 2016. Special features include deleted scenes and a featurette titled "The Cold War for Paige".
