= March 8, 1983 =

- The Americans episode
- Episode no.: Season 3 Episode 13
- Directed by: Daniel Sackheim
- Written by: Joel Fields; Joe Weisberg
- Cinematography by: Richard Rutkowski
- Editing by: Daniel Valverde
- Production code: BDU313
- Original air date: April 22, 2015
- Running time: 50 minutes

Guest appearances
- Michael Aronov as Anton Baklanov; Brandon J. Dirden as Dennis Aderholt; Rahul Khanna as Yousaf Rana; Vera Cherny as Tatiana Evgenyevna Vyazemtseva; Svetlana Efremova as Zinaida Preobrazhenskaya; Luke Robertson as Gene; Cotter Smith as Deputy Attorney General; Frank Langella as Gabriel

Episode chronology
← Previous "I Am Abassin Zadran"	Next → "Glanders"
- The Americans season 3

"March 8, 1983" is the thirteenth episode and season finale of the third season of the American period spy drama television series The Americans. It is the 39th overall episode of the series and was written by executive producer Joel Fields and series creator Joe Weisberg, and directed by executive producer Daniel Sackheim. It was released on FX on April 22, 2015.

The series is set during the Cold War and follows Elizabeth and Philip Jennings, two Soviet KGB intelligence officers posing as an American married couple living in Falls Church, a Virginia suburb of Washington, D.C., with their American-born children Paige and Henry. It also explores the conflict between Washington's FBI office and the KGB Rezidentura there, from the perspectives of agents on both sides, including the Jennings' neighbor Stan Beeman, an FBI agent working in counterintelligence. In the episode, Elizabeth and Paige travel to West Germany to meet Elizabeth's mother, while Philip seeks to solve Martha's problem.

According to Nielsen Media Research, the episode was seen by an estimated 1.22 million household viewers and gained a 0.3 ratings share among adults aged 18–49. The episode received extremely positive reviews from critics, who praised the performances and final scene, although some felt that the episode did not feel like a season finale.

== Plot ==
At an airport, Philip (Matthew Rhys) and Henry (Keidrich Sellati) bid farewell to Elizabeth (Keri Russell) and Paige (Holly Taylor) as both are heading for West Germany. Afterwards, Philip meets with Yousaf (Rahul Khanna), who confirms that his actions motivated the CIA to pull out of their deal with the Mujahideen.

In Kreuzberg, West Berlin, Paige is taken aback when Elizabeth employs techniques when she suspects they are being followed. They are hoping to get into East Germany, but are actually surprised when Elizabeth's mother (Aleksandra Myrna) appears at their hotel room. The three women embrace, with Paige finally meeting her grandmother. Later, Elizabeth confides in Paige about how her mother allowed her to leave her country with no prospect of a possible return.

Oleg (Costa Ronin) informs Stan (Noah Emmerich) that Arkady (Lev Gorn) has ordered them not to get involved in any assassination attempt unless the Center approves it. This conversation is taped by Stan, who delivers it to Gaad (Richard Thomas). Gaad is furious over Stan teaming up with Oleg without his authorization and once again suspects him of planting the bug in his office. Zinaida is arrested, but Gaad informs Stan that they will trade Zinaida for another CIA agent arrested in Russia, instead of Nina (Annet Mahendru), and that the Deputy Attorney General will decide his fate for his actions.

Philip attends an EST seminar on sex life, where he runs into Sandra (Susan Misner). They promise not to tell Elizabeth and Stan about the other's presence, while also scheduling to meet again. Later, Philip sneaks into the room of Gene (Luke Robertson), where he kills him and makes it appear like a suicide. He then plants evidence where he paints him as the person who planted the bug in Gaad's office, diverting suspicion from Martha, as well as allowing Stan to keep his job.

Elizabeth and Paige return to America, but Paige is reluctant to live a life built on lies. Philip tells Elizabeth about Gene's death, and is told that he should inform Martha about it before it is revealed at her office. Philip confides in her that, as Gene had toys in his apartment, it reminded him of Henry, which made the killing so difficult. Their conversation is interrupted when they watch a broadcast of Ronald Reagan delivering a speech in which he refers to the Soviet Union as an "Evil Empire", surprising Elizabeth. In her bedroom, a distraught Paige calls Pastor Tim, lamenting the lies that her parents told her and wanting her to keep lying to Henry. She then states that her parents are Russians.

== Production ==
=== Development ===
In March 2015, FX confirmed that the thirteenth episode of the season would be titled "March 8, 1983", and that it would be written by executive producer Joel Fields and series creator Joe Weisberg, and directed by executive producer Daniel Sackheim. This was Fields' 12th writing credit, Weisberg's 13th writing credit, and Sackheim's sixth directing credit.

=== Writing ===
Joe Weisberg said that despite the previous episode's cliffhanger, they chose to focus on other aspects for the season finale. He compared it to Philip and Elizabeth revealing their identities on the tenth episode instead of the season finale, explaining that "moving things around from their expected places just feels better to us. Things start to feel more real when they're not falling into the expected dramatic slot."

== Reception ==
=== Viewers ===
In its original American broadcast, "March 8, 1983" was seen by an estimated 1.22 million household viewers with a 0.3 in the 18-49 demographics. This means that 0.3 percent of all households with televisions watched the episode. This was a 24% increase in viewership from the previous episode, which was watched by 0.98 million household viewers with a 0.3 in the 18-49 demographics.

=== Critical reviews ===
"March 8, 1983" received extremely positive reviews from critics. Eric Goldman of IGN gave the episode a "great" 8.5 out of 10 and wrote in his verdict, "That final sequence was really well done, intercutting between Paige calling Tim and Philip's speech to Elizabeth about how he needs to approach killing people interrupted by Reagan's famous 'Evil Empire' speech – a galvanizing moment that suddenly ups the stakes for the Jennings, as they see the leader of the United States describing their people in the worst possible way. Even as the Jennings have struggled with the very dark aspects of their life, it seems as though this could once more motivate them to work harder for their cause... if they're not caught thanks to Paige's fateful phone call. Bring on Season 4!"

Erik Adams of The A.V. Club gave the episode an "A–" grade and wrote, "In a reflection of its characters and themes, “March 8, 1983” is confident, if not a little bit reckless. But that’s not to suggest that the series has any maturing to do. In a season shaped by parent-child relationships, in a finale defined by the words “Grow up,” The Americans demonstrated that it’s already come of age. And that makes one more reason to commit the date March 8, 1983 to memory."

Alan Sepinwall of HitFix wrote, "That the show can be as great as it is in spite of that speaks to what an extraordinary job Fields, Weisberg and everyone else have done with the family and spy stories this year. The remarkable thing, though, is that there are still areas where The Americans can improve after all this time, and think about what a meat grinder that version of the show would be." Anthony Breznican of Entertainment Weekly wrote, "I have to admit, this episode frustrated me as a season finale. It felt more like an incredibly good penultimate episode, and ending on such a stark cliffhanger with many other plot threads dangling, feels like a mistake. The creators of The Americans have manufactured some savage tension, but that will only dissipate as we await season 4, rather than leaving us with a completed story line, as they did last year."

Laura Hudson of Vulture gave the episode a 3 star rating out of 5 and wrote, "The two lives of Mr. and Mrs. Jennings have always moved at different speeds: While their KGB missions have pinballed wildly between sex, murder, and international intrigue from one week to the next, the story of their family life has always been in slow motion — at least until now. The tension with Paige had been building for a season, but now that the Berlin Wall between their work and their family has finally fallen, things are changing, and fast." Alec Bojalad of Den of Geek gave the episode a 4.5 star rating out of 5 and wrote, "The Americans season three has been a terrific television-watching experience. It's also been a meditation on the folly of expecting people to behave in predictable ways in an unpredictable time. March 8, 1983 may be a convenient date to mark the beginning of the Cold War in earnest, but the true Cold War, us trying to make sense of the senseless, never really begins or ends."

Ben Travers of IndieWire gave the episode a "B+" grade and wrote, "Past finales for The Americans addressed the issues presented in the season, but the lack of closure in 'March 8, 1983' indicates an ongoing problem for the Jennings." Matt Brennan of Slant Magazine wrote, "In 'March 8, 1983,' 48 minutes that come as near to perfection as television can, it turns out that the phenomenology of evil and the doctrine of sin are inadequate hermeneutics for the dark night of the soul."
