= Do Mail Robots Dream of Electric Sheep? =

- The Americans episode
- Episode no.: Season 3 Episode 9
- Directed by: Stephen Williams
- Written by: Joshua Brand
- Cinematography by: Richard Rutkowski
- Editing by: Amanda Pollack
- Production code: BDU309
- Original air date: March 25, 2015
- Running time: 47 minutes

Guest appearances
- Brandon J. Dirden as Dennis Aderholt; Peter Mark Kendall as Hans; Lois Smith as Betty Turner; Svetlana Efremova as Zinaida Preobrazhenskaya; Will Pullen as Todd; Frank Langella as Gabriel

Episode chronology
← Previous "Divestment"	Next → "Stingers"
- The Americans season 3

"Do Mail Robots Dream of Electric Sheep?" is the ninth episode of the third season of the American period spy drama television series The Americans. It is the 35th overall episode of the series and was written by consulting producer Joshua Brand, and directed by Stephen Williams. It was released on FX on March 25, 2015.

The series is set during the Cold War and follows Elizabeth and Philip Jennings, two Soviet KGB intelligence officers posing as an American married couple living in Falls Church, a Virginia suburb of Washington, D.C., with their American-born children Paige and Henry. It also explores the conflict between Washington's FBI office and the KGB Rezidentura there, from the perspectives of agents on both sides, including the Jennings' neighbor Stan Beeman, an FBI agent working in counterintelligence. In the episode, Philip and Elizabeth are assigned to plant a bug in the FBI's damaged Mail Robot, but face problems when an old woman appears. Meanwhile, Stan and Oleg decide to use Zinaida for their purposes.

According to Nielsen Media Research, the episode was seen by an estimated 0.99 million household viewers and gained a 0.3 ratings share among adults aged 18–49. The episode received critical acclaim, with critics praising the scenes between Elizabeth and Betty. For the episode, Joshua Brand received a nomination for Outstanding Writing for a Drama Series at the 67th Primetime Emmy Awards.

== Plot ==
Elizabeth (Keri Russell) meets with Hans (Peter Mark Kendall). She states that their collaboration is over because Todd (Will Pullen) may have seen Hans when they left the warehouse. Elizabeth is not willing to take a risk despite Hans's desire to serve. Philip (Matthew Rhys) tells her that the bug in Gaad's office was found and that Martha (Alison Wright) knows that he does not work at OPR. He still plans on spending the day at Martha's, even though Elizabeth is worried that she may have told authorities.

Philip visits Martha, who acts like nothing happened and they resume their normal life. Martha tells him that Gaad damaged the FBI's Mail Robot, which is being sent to be repaired. Gabriel (Frank Langella) instructs Philip and Elizabeth to plant a bug in the Mail Robot, even if the situation may be a set-up. At a warehouse, Hans shoots Todd but is forced to kill him with his hands when the gun gets jammed. He meets with Elizabeth to inform her of the event. She is shocked but decides to continue working with him.

That night, Philip and Elizabeth sneak into the repair facility where the Mail Robot is being kept. Hearing noise, Elizabeth investigates and finds an old woman, Betty Turner (Lois Smith). Elizabeth tells Betty that she was sent to repair the robot, and allows Betty to work on the company's books, as Betty originally planned. While working, Betty talks about her life, which seems to move Elizabeth. When she talks to Philip, he seems indifferent, telling her that she chose the wrong time to go back to the office. When Betty asks about Elizabeth's past, Elizabeth reveals her identity. Realizing she will die, Betty swallows all of her heart medication pills. Before dying she tells Elizabeth that her actions are evil and that she is not making the world a better place. A devastated Elizabeth leaves the office, Philip finishes installing the bug and refuses to talk about her death.

Stan (Noah Emmerich) and Oleg (Costa Ronin) decide to investigate Zinaida (Svetlana Efremova) to determine her true allegiance. Stan leaves Zinaida at a hotel room while he leaves to get food. Zinaida is confronted by Oleg, hiding in the shadows. Oleg says that if she does not recant her statement about the Soviets' involvement in the Soviet–Afghan War and return to the USSR she will be dead within two weeks. As Stan arrives, Oleg hits him in the head and escapes. The next day, Stan meets with Oleg, who reports Zinaida's indifference to the threat. Philip and Gabriel play Scrabble as Gabriel talks about the concept of love. Philip shares his frustration that Gabriel failed to look out for him, and that Philip now must look out for his family himself.

== Production ==
=== Development ===
In February 2015, FX confirmed that the ninth episode of the season would be titled "Do Mail Robots Dream of Electric Sheep?", and that it would be written by consulting producer Joshua Brand, and directed by Stephen Williams. This was Brand's eighth writing credit, and Williams' first directing credit.

== Reception ==
=== Viewers ===
In its original American broadcast, "Do Mail Robots Dream of Electric Sheep?" was seen by an estimated 0.99 million household viewers with a 0.3 in the 18–49 demographics. This means that 0.3 percent of all households with televisions watched the episode. This was a 13% decrease in viewership from the previous episode, which was watched by 1.13 million household viewers with a 0.3 in the 18–49 demographics.

=== Critical reviews ===
"Do Mail Robots Dream of Electric Sheep?" received critical acclaim. Eric Goldman of IGN gave the episode an "amazing" 9.5 out of 10 and wrote in his verdict, "No, I'm not ignoring that final scene, as Philip let Gabriel know he was fully aware of his attempted manipulations. And I'm curious to see where that goes, but in the context of this episode, it was a bit overwhelmed by everything else going on with Martha, Stan and Oleg and that absolutely riveting situation with Elizabeth encountering Betty. The Americans has been on the top of its game this season and this episode was a particularly impactful example of how great this show is."

Erik Adams of The A.V. Club gave the episode an "A−" grade and wrote, "A patiently and proficiently nerve-wracking episode, 'Do Mail Robots Dream Of Electric Sheep?' calls out for a pint of Frusen Glädjé, but part of its power is in the way it withholds the sweet stuff. Then again, there is that eponymous machine."

Alan Sepinwall of HitFix wrote, "I love how the episode, written by Joshua Brand and directed by Stephen Williams, lets the two women serve and volley for a very long time before Elizabeth comes right out and says she has to die, and then keeps the conversation going even after that." Joshua Rivera of Entertainment Weekly wrote, "Lois Smith will have only one appearance on The Americans, obviously, but it leaves behind tremendous aftermath. This performance needs to be considered for an Emmy in the guest actress category."

Laura Hudson of Vulture gave the episode a 3 star rating out of 5 and wrote, "Despite a brutal murder and an assault, this was nonetheless one of the quieter episodes of this show. A lot of it was spent talking to a woman we'll probably never see again, a woman who has to die because of a robot. And most of the action happens under the surface, as things start to shift: Martha finally gets with the program, in her own way, while in his own way, Philip starts to get out of it." Alec Bojalad of Den of Geek gave the episode a perfect 5 star rating out of 5 and wrote, "This is sad, brutal stuff. And it's also wonderful, near-perfect television. It's not just wonderful because it's bleak and subsequently the buzzword for disposable modern TV: gritty. It's wonderful because it's human. It knows what makes humans both powerful and vulnerable and is able to articulate that superbly. Strange as it may sound, the episode that so callously murders an old woman is an episode all about love... and also just how shitty it makes us."

Casey Cipriani of IndieWire gave the episode an "A" grade and wrote, "The presence or absence of parental figures weighed heavily on this week's episode of The Americans, and it was almost as if the position everyone thought they were in—when it came to how they relate to their own mothers, fathers or children—had been suddenly switched." Matt Brennan of Slant Magazine wrote, "Indeed, the issue of means and ends, of the role patriotism plays in convincing the otherwise moral person to commit despicable crimes, is the thread tying the episode's disparate subplots together. 'Do Mail Robots Dream of Electric Sheep?' continues this season's use of violence to indicate the disconnect between actions and abstract ideals; from the shatter of bones in 'Baggage' to last week's gory immolation in 'Divestment,' the series has returned again and again to the dirty brutality of the Cold War campaign to depict the high dudgeon on both sides as morally dishonest."

=== Accolades ===
For the episode, Joshua Brand was nominated for Outstanding Writing for a Drama Series at the 67th Primetime Emmy Awards. He would lose to Game of Thrones for the episode "Mother's Mercy".

Lois Smith was nominated for a Critics' Choice Television Award for best guest performer in a drama series for her role in the episode.
