= Dimebag (The Americans) =

- The Americans episode
- Episode no.: Season 3 Episode 4
- Directed by: Thomas Schlamme
- Written by: Peter Ackerman
- Production code: BDU304
- Original air date: February 18, 2015
- Running time: 45 minutes

Guest appearances
- Julia Garner as Kimberly Breland; Brandon J. Dirden as Agent Aderholt; Svetlana Efremova as Zinaida Preobrazhenskaya; Katja Herbers as Evi Sneijder; Kelly AuCoin as Pastor Tim; Frank Langella as Gabriel

Episode chronology
← Previous "Open House"	Next → "Salang Pass"
- The Americans season 3

"Dimebag" is the fourth episode of third season of the American television drama series The Americans, and the 30th overall episode of the series. It originally aired on February 18, 2015, in the United States on FX.

== Plot ==
After learning their telephone target has employed Kimberly "Kimmy" Breland, daughter of the head of the CIA's Afghan group, as a babysitter, Philip is tasked with recruiting Kimmy, who is nearly the same age as Paige. He provides fake IDs for Kimmy and her friends, and later she asks to see him alone. They smoke pot and listen to her favorite album together. Nina is pressured to get a confession from her cellmate, Evi Sneijder, and slowly starts to open up to her. Stan publicly voices his opinion at an EST meeting and is asked out on a date afterward by a woman named Tori; he turns her down flat in spite of Philip's reminder that "you are single now". Later, Stan confesses his affair to his wife, Sandra, who is upset by his confession. Paige's birthday is approaching and she requests to invite Pastor Tim and his wife to dinner. During the meal, Paige says that she wants to be baptized, and the visitors support her decision. Later, Philip and Elizabeth think Paige ambushed them with the request and invited her guests for support.

== Production ==
The episode was written by Peter Ackerman and directed by Thomas Schlamme.

== Reception ==
The episode was watched by 972,000 viewers and scored 0.24 ratings in 18–49 demographics, as per Nielsen ratings. It received positive reviews. Erik Adams of The A.V. Club gave the episode a B+ grade. Alan Sepinwall called the episode "great".
