= Divestment (The Americans) =

- The Americans episode
- Episode no.: Season 3 Episode 8
- Directed by: Dan Attias
- Written by: Joshua Brand
- Cinematography by: Richard Rutkowski
- Editing by: Marnee Meyer
- Production code: BDU308
- Original air date: March 18, 2015
- Running time: 46 minutes

Guest appearances
- Michael Aronov as Anton Baklanov; Brandon J. Dirden as Dennis Aderholt; Jefferson Mays as Walter Taffet; Neil Sandilands as Eugene Venter; Dwayne Alistair Thomas as Reuben Ncgobo; Peter Mark Kendall as Hans; Boris Krutonog as Igor Burov; Misha Kuznetsov as KGB Man; Will Pullen as Todd; Luke Robertson as Gene; Peter Von Berg as Vasili Nikolaevich; Frank Langella as Gabriel

Episode chronology
| ← Previous "Walter Taffet" | Next → "Do Mail Robots Dream of Electric Sheep?" |
- The Americans season 3

"Divestment" is the eighth episode of the third season of the American period spy drama television series The Americans. It is the 34th overall episode of the series and was written by consulting producer Joshua Brand, and directed by Dan Attias. It was released on FX on March 18, 2015.

The series is set during the Cold War, the show follows Elizabeth and Philip Jennings, two Soviet KGB intelligence officers posing as an American married couple living in Falls Church, a Virginia suburb of Washington, D.C., with their American-born children Paige and Henry. It also explores the conflict between Washington's FBI office and the KGB Rezidentura there, from the perspectives of agents on both sides, including the Jennings' neighbor Stan Beeman, an FBI agent working in counterintelligence. In the episode, Elizabeth and Philip interrogate two men that may be involved in an attack, while Martha is interrogated by Taffet.

According to Nielsen Media Research, the episode was seen by an estimated 1.13 million household viewers and gained a 0.3 ratings share among adults aged 18–49. The episode received extremely positive reviews from critics, who praised the performances, character development and atmosphere.

== Plot ==
Elizabeth (Keri Russell), Philip (Matthew Rhys) and Reuben (Dwayne A. Thomas) interrogate Todd (Will Pullen) and Venter (Neil Sandilands) at an abandoned warehouse. The men refuse to disclose any information even under the promise of new identities, prompting them to torture them. In prison, Nina (Annet Mahendru) is informed that her cooperation in proving Sneijder's guilt reduced her sentence to ten years. She is then offered a pardon, if she can get Russian physicist Anton Baklonov to increase his productivity.

Taffet (Jefferson Mays) questions Gaad's staff, including Martha (Alison Wright), about the bug found at his office. At his office, Arkady (Lev Gorn) is called by Igor Burov (Boris Krutonog), the Minister of Railways. Igor wants Oleg back in the Soviet Union and tells Arkady to make him reconsider his intent in staying. Arkady talks with Oleg over his father's desires, but tells him he will convince him in allowing him to stay.

Back at the warehouse, Todd states that he only helped Venter in watching over people involved in the anti-apartheid movement. When Venter refuses to cooperate, Reuben sets him on fire to kill him. This prompts Todd to confess that he was supposed to set a bomb on a campus, but eventually decided against it. After he leads them to the bomb in his apartment, Reuben suggests killing Todd, but Philip and Elizabeth decide to release him for his cooperation, deeming him as a non-threat.

Paige (Holly Taylor) finds a photograph of Gregory in the library in microfiche records, which reveals that he was a drug dealer. When she asks Elizabeth about it, she explains that Gregory went through a difficult phase and did what he could to go forward with his life. Nina is transferred to a facility run by Vasili (Peter Von Berg). He states that he will work with her, even if he cannot forgive her for her betrayal. She then meets with Anton (Michael Aronov), who ignores her as she is not a scientist.

Elizabeth visits Gabriel (Frank Langella), asking for his help in getting Philip's son, Mischa, out of his position during the Soviet–Afghan War. Philip, as Clark, visits Martha at their house. She reveals her meeting with Taffet and questions his real identity. He reiterates he loves her and that she must trust him, consoling her as she sobs. The episode ends with Philip and Martha in the bed, unable to sleep.

== Production ==
=== Development ===
In February 2015, FX confirmed that the eighth episode of the season would be titled "Divestment", and that it would be written by consulting producer Joshua Brand, and directed by Dan Attias. This was Brand's seventh writing credit, and Attias' first directing credit.

== Reception ==
=== Viewers ===
In its original American broadcast, "Divestment" was seen by an estimated 1.13 million household viewers with a 0.3 in the 18–49 demographics. This means that 0.3 percent of all households with televisions watched the episode. This was a 8% decrease in viewership from the previous episode, which was watched by 1.22 million household viewers with a 0.4 in the 18–49 demographics.

=== Critical reviews ===
"Divestment" received extremely positive reviews from critics. Erik Adams of The A.V. Club gave the episode an "A−" grade and wrote, "To me, 'Divestment' is all about that 'di'—as in the Greek root for 'two.' Every crucial moment of this episode, every potentially explosive exchange, occurs between two characters. It's hard to pick up on at first, but 'Divestment' is one of the most cleverly structured episodes of The Americans' third season."

Alan Sepinwall of HitFix wrote, "Another great episode that managed to keep the tension and ugliness high even as the two teenage girls who've been at the center of so much of this season's drama were shunted off to the side for a week." Laura Hudson of Vulture gave the episode a 3 star rating out of 5 and wrote, "This week, many of our favorite spies, kids, and administrative assistants struggle with some tough questions: Who are the good guys and who are the bad guys? Whom do we protect, and whom do we sacrifice? When do you give someone a second chance, and when do you burn them?"

Joshua Rivera of Entertainment Weekly wrote, "It feels strange to call an episode where so many things happen 'slow,' especially on a show like The Americans, where slow is very much the point. But that's how 'Divestment' feels, mostly because it spends its time moving a number of this season's plots forward just the slightest bit, without much in the way of that fraught tension the show is known for. Nonetheless, the moves made tonight are important ones—all things to add to the powder keg at the end of a very long fuse." Alec Bojalad of Den of Geek gave the episode a 3.5 star rating out of 5 and wrote, "That's the beauty of The Americans. It really is a carefully-paced slow emotional drama but then out of nowhere a diplomat's folded up body is being shoved into a suitcase or a South African terrorist is screaming as flames engulf him."

Ben Travers of IndieWire gave the episode an "A" grade and wrote, "'Divestment' featured more confrontation than perhaps any television episode before it, and it certainly left us the most uncertain of where those discussions will lead." Matt Brennan of Slant Magazine wrote, "Revelation by revelation, The Americans continues to strip each character of what they think they know, until all that's left is bone."
