= Open House (The Americans) =

- The Americans episode
- Episode no.: Season 3 Episode 3
- Directed by: Thomas Schlamme
- Written by: Stuart Zicherman
- Production code: BDU303
- Original air date: February 11, 2015
- Running time: 43 minutes

Guest appearances
- Brandon J. Dirden as Agent Aderholt; Reg Rogers as Charles Duluth; Vera Cherny as Tatiana; Svetlana Efremova as Zinaida Preobrazhenskaya; David Furr as Ted Paaswell; Peter Mark Kendall as Hans; Frank Langella as Gabriel; Julia Garner as Kimberly Breland

Episode chronology
← Previous "Baggage"	Next → "Dimebag"
- The Americans season 3

"Open House" is the third episode of third season of the American television drama series The Americans, and the 29th overall episode of the series. It originally aired on February 11, 2015 in the United States on FX.

== Plot ==
Gabriel (Frank Langella) debriefs Philip (Matthew Rhys) on the members of the CIA's Afghan group, telling him their best asset is Ted Paaswell (David Furr), who is selling his house and has lowered the price twice in the month. Philip and Elizabeth (Keri Russell) go to Ted Paaswell's open house posing as interested buyers. Philip excuses himself from the tour and bugs Paaswell's radio. Paaswell enters the room and takes the radio with him and Philip and Elizabeth follow him in their car.

At the Rezidentura, Arkady Ivanovich (Lev Gorn) tells Oleg (Costa Ronin) that his father has put him up for transfer back to Moscow. He tells Oleg that the decision is his if he wishes to transfer or to disobey his father's orders. Elizabeth notices a car tailing them as they tail Paaswell. Philip gets out of the car and alerts the Centre. He returns home to Paige (Holly Taylor), where he apologizes to her for the pressure his and Elizabeth's continuing absence puts on her.

The FBI discuss the pursuit; Agent Aderholt (Brandon J. Dirden) convinces Agent Gaad (Richard Thomas) that they should put up a roadblock and grab Elizabeth. The KGB intercept the officers with a radio jammer, disrupting their communication with each other. The officer behind Elizabeth is crashed into and Elizabeth ditches her car. She returns home to Philip and they embrace; however, Elizabeth's tooth (previously injured by Gaad) has become too infected and must be extracted. Philip and Elizabeth go to the laundry room and Philip takes a pair of pliers and extracts the infected tooth from Elizabeth.

Agent Aderholt discusses Stan's undercover time with the white supremacists. He asks what it took to fool them and Stan replies "Tell them what they wanna hear." Martha (Alison Wright) discusses with Philip (as Clark) them adopting a foster child. Gabriel advises Philip to stay away from Paaswell after what happened. Philip believes they can observe Paaswell. He confronts Gabriel about his and Elizabeth's intention to inform Paige, arguing that he and Elizabeth had a choice when they were recruited. Oleg tells Arkady Ivanovich that he has decided to stay. Stan watches Zinaida Preobrazhenskaya (Svetlana Efremova) denounce the Soviet–Afghan War on television and he begins to be suspicious about her intentions.

Philip and Elizabeth listen to a conversation Paaswell is having with his babysitter. They decide to pass them by in their car, but overhear Paaswell rebuffing the babysitter's advances. As they pass the babysitter's house, Philip notices her father's license plate and realizes her father is Isaac Breland, the head of the CIA Afghan group.

== Production ==
The episode was written by Stuart Zicherman and directed by Thomas Schlamme.

== Reception ==
The episode was watched by 1.02 million viewers and scored 0.3 ratings in 18–49 demographics, as per Nielsen ratings.

"Open House" received critical acclaim. Matthew Rhys and Keri Russell were praised for the tooth extraction scene. Erik Adams of The A.V. Club gave the episode an A grade. He said "There's no mistaking Matthew Rhys' determined countenance or the tears in Keri Russell's eyes—this is a moment when trust is put to the ultimate test, and 'Open House' conveys that trust from either side of the pliers." Alan Sepinwall called the episode "terrific", praising Russell and Rhys.
