= I Am Abassin Zadran =

- The Americans episode
- Episode no.: Season 3 Episode 12
- Directed by: Christopher Misiano
- Written by: Peter Ackerman; Stuart Zicherman
- Cinematography by: Richard Rutkowski
- Editing by: Amanda Pollack
- Production code: BDU312
- Original air date: April 15, 2015
- Running time: 45 minutes

Guest appearances
- Brandon J. Dirden as Dennis Aderholt; George Georgiou as Abassin Zadran; Karen Pittman as Lisa; Kelly AuCoin as Pastor Tim; Vera Cherny as Tatiana Evgenyevna Vyazemtseva; Thaddeus Daniels as Maurice; Peter Mark Kendall as Hans; Margo Martindale as Claudia; Frank Langella as Gabriel

Episode chronology
← Previous "One Day in the Life of Anton Baklanov"	Next → "March 8, 1983"
- The Americans season 3

"I Am Abassin Zadran" is the twelfth episode of the third season of the American period spy drama television series The Americans. It is the 38th overall episode of the series and was written by story editor Peter Ackerman and co-executive producer Stuart Zicherman, and directed by Christopher Misiano. It was released on FX on April 15, 2015.

The series is set during the Cold War and follows Elizabeth and Philip Jennings, two Soviet KGB intelligence officers posing as an American married couple living in Falls Church, a Virginia suburb of Washington, D.C., with their American-born children Paige and Henry. It also explores the conflict between Washington's FBI office and the KGB Rezidentura there, from the perspectives of agents on both sides, including the Jennings' neighbor Stan Beeman, an FBI agent working in counterintelligence. In the episode, Philip tries to help Martha during her crisis, while Paige acts hastily towards her parents.

According to Nielsen Media Research, the episode was seen by an estimated 0.98 million household viewers and gained a 0.3 ratings share among adults aged 18–49. The episode received extremely positive reviews from critics, who praised the final scene. For the episode, Margo Martindale won Outstanding Guest Actress in a Drama Series at the 67th Primetime Creative Arts Emmy Awards.

== Plot ==
Philip (Matthew Rhys) and Elizabeth (Keri Russell) surveil the hotel where the CIA is meeting with the Mujahideen, eventually discovering the phone line connected to the CIA room. They return home, discovering Henry (Keidrich Sellati) alone, and a note from Paige (Holly Taylor) stating that she is staying the night with Pastor Tim (Kelly AuCoin) following a church lecture. They corner Pastor Tim at home, and take Paige back home.

That night, Philip goes to meet Martha (Alison Wright) at her apartment. However, he is warned by Hans (Peter Mark Kendall) to go back, as a government agent is visiting her. The agent turns out to be Stan (Noah Emmerich), who wanted to talk with her about her behavior & wellbeing. The following day, Philip has Hans pick up Martha to meet him at a safe spot. Finding that Stan was the visitor, Philip says he will take care of it, suggesting they could move away. At the FBI office, Stan is questioned by Dennis Aderholt (Brandon J. Dirden) over planting the bug on Gaad's office, upsetting him.

At the hotel, Philip and Elizabeth pose as CIA agents to meet with the Mujahideen. Using the phone lines to gain access, they leave with the commander, Abassin Zadran (George Georgiou). They convince him that the other Mujahideen commanders accompanying him are planning to sell the Stinger missiles to the Soviets. The following day, Abassin meets with the two other commanders and murders them, for which he is arrested by CIA agents. At a diner, Gabriel (Frank Langella) shares his concerns to Claudia (Margo Martindale) about Paige's role in her parents' plans, but Claudia tells him to follow the orders.

Paige continues questioning her life, especially when she discovers that many of her "family members" are not really her family. Deciding that she needs to find her real family, Philip convinces Elizabeth in letting Paige accompany her in visiting her mother in the Soviet Union.

Philip visits Martha, who is planning to leave for a while to meet with her parents, as she becomes more paranoid and cannot trust him. This prompts Philip to remove his wig and reveal his true appearance, shocking her.

== Production ==
=== Development ===
In March 2015, FX confirmed that the twelfth episode of the season would be titled "I Am Abassin Zadran", and that it would be written by story editor Peter Ackerman and co-executive producer Stuart Zicherman, and directed by Christopher Misiano. This was Ackerman's second writing credit, Zicherman's third writing credit, and Misiano's first directing credit.

== Reception ==
=== Viewers ===
In its original American broadcast, "I Am Abassin Zadran" was seen by an estimated 0.98 million household viewers with a 0.3 in the 18-49 demographics. This means that 0.3 percent of all households with televisions watched the episode. This was a slight decrease in viewership from the previous episode, which was watched by 1.04 million household viewers with a 0.3 in the 18-49 demographics.

=== Critical reviews ===
"I Am Abassin Zadran" received extremely positive reviews from critics. Eric Goldman of IGN gave the episode a "great" 8.5 out of 10 and wrote in his verdict, "With the Season 3 finale next week, this week's Americans once more showed just how unstable and precarious things re with Paige and Martha, now that both of them are in the know - even if it's not quite at the same level."

Erik Adams of The A.V. Club gave the episode an "A–" grade and wrote, "Withholding information is crucial to the characters of The Americans, but the show itself doesn't have to play so safe. Gabriel and Claudia's greasy-spoon rendezvous pushes season three toward its climax with a strategic confession, one previously unknown to the troops on the ground as well as those watching at home. By letting its secrets out, The Americans continues to top itself."

Alan Sepinwall of HitFix wrote, "It may just be that Fields and Weisberg plan to carry a lot of the current arcs into next season. But even so, I don't feel the sense of narrative momentum that I did at comparable points in the previous two seasons. I expect the emotions of the finale to be as fraught as they've been all year, and that's ultimately what matters most. But I'd like to see a bit more balance between plot and character going forward, if that's possible." Anthony Breznican of Entertainment Weekly wrote, "Good Lord, what a terrifying reveal! After several expository installments, this penultimate episode of season 3 of The Americans was a live-wire of action as some of the slow-build machinations of The Center came to fruition and a few loose-cannon actions threatened to upend everything."

Laura Hudson of Vulture gave the episode a 3 star rating out of 5 and wrote, "Spying is largely a profession about knowledge — stealing it, knowing it, and sometimes transforming it into lies. Not everyone does very positive things with the knowledge they've been given this week, and sometimes it's downright terrifying." Alec Bojalad of Den of Geek gave the episode a 4 star rating out of 5 and wrote, "Like Abassin Zadran, himself, 'I Am Abassin Zadran' ruthlessly accomplishes its goal: setting up next week's finale. Maybe someone will make it out of a hotel room unscathed."

Ben Travers of IndieWire gave the episode an "A–" grade and wrote, "Exactly one year later, oh how the tables have turned. Philip revealing his true self to Martha after she threatened to leave him shows just how attached he's become to his second wife. Sure, he could still kill her and eliminate the problem, but the revelation seems like a whole lot of trouble for him to take it all back next week." Matt Brennan of Slant Magazine wrote, "'I Am Abassin Zadran' in fact hinges on several internecine struggles, within families as well as within intelligence services, a paranoiac hour in which skepticism of one's erstwhile allies places renewed strain on all concerned."

=== Accolades ===
For the episode, Margo Martindale was nominated for Outstanding Guest Actress in a Drama Series at the 67th Primetime Creative Arts Emmy Awards. She would win the award, becoming the first actress of the series to win an Emmy.
