= One Day in the Life of Anton Baklanov =

- The Americans episode
- Episode no.: Season 3 Episode 11
- Directed by: Andrew Bernstein
- Written by: Stephen Schiff; Tracey Scott Wilson
- Cinematography by: Richard Rutkowski
- Editing by: Marnee Meyer
- Production code: BDU311
- Original air date: April 8, 2015
- Running time: 45 minutes

Guest appearances
- Michael Aronov as Anton Baklanov; Rahul Khanna as Yousaf Rana; Jefferson Mays as Walter Taffet; Vera Cherny as Tatiana Evgenyevna Vyazemtseva; Thaddeus Daniels as Maurice; Bill Heck as Neil; Peter Mark Kendall as Hans; Karen Pittman as Lisa; Luke Robertson as Gene; Frank Langella as Gabriel

Episode chronology
| ← Previous "Stingers" | Next → "I Am Abassin Zadran" |
- The Americans season 3

"One Day in the Life of Anton Baklanov" is the eleventh episode of the third season of the American period spy drama television series The Americans. It is the 37th overall episode of the series and was written by co-executive producer Stephen Schiff and story editor Tracey Scott Wilson, and directed by Andrew Bernstein. It was released on FX on April 8, 2015.

The series is set during the Cold War and follows Elizabeth and Philip Jennings, two Soviet KGB intelligence officers posing as an American married couple living in Falls Church, a Virginia suburb of Washington, D.C., with their American-born children Paige and Henry. It also explores the conflict between Washington's FBI office and the KGB Rezidentura there, from the perspectives of agents on both sides, including the Jennings' neighbor Stan Beeman, an FBI agent working in counterintelligence. In the episode, Elizabeth receives bad news about her mother's health, while Philip helps Martha during an incoming interview with Taffet.

According to Nielsen Media Research, the episode was seen by an estimated 1.04 million household viewers and gained a 0.3 ratings share among adults aged 18–49. The episode received extremely positive reviews from critics, who praised the performances, pacing and themes.

== Plot ==
Paige (Holly Taylor) starts to question many events in her life. She also asks Philip (Matthew Rhys) and Elizabeth (Keri Russell) their real names, also discovering that many family trips were part of operations for them.

Philip and Elizabeth inform Gabriel (Frank Langella) about Paige's knowledge, which he deems as a good thing. Gabriel also informs Elizabeth that her mother's health is deteriorating. Despite this, Elizabeth visits Lisa (Karen Pittman), wanting to reveal more information about Northrop. Philip, meanwhile, meets with Yousaf (Rahul Khanna), who tells him that the meeting between the CIA and the Mujahideen is for the United States to sell Stinger missiles. He also asks Gabriel to get Elizabeth to visit her mother. When he declines, Philip gets annoyed that the Center cannot help them when they need them.

At the Soviet facility, Nina (Annet Mahendru) spends more time with Anton Baklanov (Michael Aronov), now mostly talking in English, raising his interest. Anton eventually opens up about his family, revealing that he misses his son, who is not aware of his current status. Nina finds letters that Anton wrote for his son; she reveals reading them, but promises not to say anything.

As Taffet (Jefferson Mays) wants to talk with her again, Martha (Alison Wright) breaks down during Philip's visit. Philip then teaches her methods in how to lie convincingly. During the interview, Taffet is convinced by her statement. At the hotel, Elizabeth seduces Neil (Bill Heck), the owner, and has sex with him so he can show her his office. While Hans (Peter Mark Kendall) distracts Neil, Elizabeth uses the computer to find the meeting room and get a key. She returns home, where she has sex with Philip. The following morning, as Philip explains that he will make sure to get Elizabeth to visit her mother, they are interrupted by Paige. They reveal their conversation. When Paige asks Elizabeth if she will visit her mother, Elizabeth replies, "No, I can't." This prompts Paige to leave the bedroom.

== Production ==
=== Development ===
In March 2015, FX confirmed that the eleventh episode of the season would be titled "One Day in the Life of Anton Baklanov", and that it would be written by co-executive producer Stephen Schiff and story editor Tracey Scott Wilson, and directed by Andrew Bernstein. This was Schiff's fourth writing credit, Wilson's third writing credit, and Bernstein's second directing credit.

== Reception ==
=== Viewers ===
In its original American broadcast, "One Day in the Life of Anton Baklanov" was seen by an estimated 1.04 million household viewers with a 0.3 in the 18-49 demographics. This means that 0.3 percent of all households with televisions watched the episode. This was a 15% increase in viewership from the previous episode, which was watched by 0.90 million household viewers with a 0.3 in the 18-49 demographics.

=== Critical reviews ===
"One Day in the Life of Anton Baklanov" received extremely positive reviews from critics. Eric Goldman of IGN gave the episode an "amazing" 9 out of 10 and wrote in his verdict, "The Americans is ultimately the story about the very, very messy family dynamic the Jennings have established – and right now, things seem more difficult than ever. There was something so sad about that sex scene between Elizabeth and Philip, who truly love each other, but are both in such damaged, fragile places right now – and obviously, we knew she was in a very upset state of mind, having been tuned into “the honey trap” once again for their job. It's easier than ever to imagine them just taking Paige and Henry and running off somewhere... so now I'm more curious than ever what will keep them tied into this world that asks so much of them."

Erik Adams of The A.V. Club gave the episode a "B" grade and wrote, "Hot on the heels of the series' most explosive revelation, 'One Day In The Life' doesn't hit the gas, accelerating wildly toward the conclusion of season three’s major arcs. Instead, in true Americans fashion, the episode steps back to contemplate a) what it means to trust, b) how control can be taken and given freely, and c) how the show's characters use trust and control in order to manipulate others — and manipulate their own perception. Slotting 'One Day In The Life Of Anton Baklanov' along with the rest of season three, Stephen Schiff and Tracey Scott Wilson's script filters all of this through the experiences of being someone's caretaker and being taken care of."

Alan Sepinwall of HitFix wrote, "With only two episodes to go in the season, I'm expecting some major ugliness. But I could also stand for a little more tidiness by this time next year." Anthony Breznican of Entertainment Weekly wrote, "This week's episode of The Americans is a relatively mellow affair, but this scene between a mother and daughter sitting in a parked car in their garage is one of the more gutting exchanges on the series this season."

Laura Hudson of Vulture gave the episode a 4 star rating out of 5 and wrote, "Last night's episode involved a lot of tense interrogation, and for once, Walter Taffet isn't the one asking the toughest questions: It's Paige." Alec Bojalad of Den of Geek gave the episode a 3.5 star rating out of 5 and wrote, "'One Day in the Life of Anton Baklanov' deals with the fallout of 'Stingers' in which Paige finally learns the truth about her parents."

Ben Travers of IndieWire gave the episode a "B" grade and wrote, "'One Day in the Life of Anton Baklanov' served as a reactionary episode more than a progressive one — which we should’ve guessed given the title favoring a Russian scientist we barely know." Matt Brennan of Slant Magazine wrote, "As the season enters the home stretch, 'One Day in the Life' prepares the characters to reel in the big fish they've been tracking lately, yet never quite assuages the niggling feeling that these efforts will become a tangled mess."
