= A. F. S. Talyarkhan =

Indian cricket commentator

Ardeshir Furdorji Sohrabji Talyarkhan
- Born: 1897
- Died: 13 July 1990 (aged 92–93)
- Occupations: Cricket Commentator, Columnist
- Children: Geetanjali Talyarkhan
- Relatives: Vinod Khanna (son-in-law)

Ardeshir Furdorji Sohrabji "Bobby" Talyarkhan (1897–13 July 1990) was an Indian cricket commentator.

Talyarkhan was Indian cricket's first radio commentator. His radio commentaries played an important role in spreading of the game and making the name of the players throughout the country. Bombay Pentangular owed some of its popularity to his voice. He first commentated on a match between Parsees and Muslims played at the Bombay Gymkhana in November 1934.

Talyarkhan had "a fine command of English, a polished public speaking style and an ability to create dramatic interest in the game". He disliked sharing the microphone and did the commentaries all alone throughout the day. Ramachandra Guha felt that he "brought to cricket broadcasting a rich, fruity voice and a fund of anecdotes. He was ambitious and opinionated, with a voice that was 'beer-soaked, cigarette-stained'. His self control was superhuman, for he would speak without interruptions, except for lunch and tea."

His career with the All India Radio ended with the series against West Indies in 1948–49. AIR insisted on having a team of three commentators, with which Talyarkhan disagreed. The only time he shared the mike was when India made its first tour of Pakistan in 1954–55. He made a brief reappearance in 1972-73 when he presented the close of play summaries.

Ardeshir was born to Furdonji / Furdorji Sorabji Talyarkhan and Meherbanu (née Murzban). He was the eldest in 5 siblings. Ardeshir's daughter Geetanjali Talyarkhan married actor Vinod Khanna, and he was the maternal grandfather of actors Rahul Khanna and Akshaye Khanna. Talyarkhan continued writing his daily columns till his death on 13 July 1990.
