= Salang Pass (The Americans) =

- The Americans episode
- Episode no.: Season 3 Episode 5
- Directed by: Kevin Dowling
- Written by: Stephen Schiff
- Production code: BDU305
- Original air date: February 25, 2015
- Running time: 41 minutes

Episode chronology
← Previous "Dimebag"	Next → "Born Again"
- The Americans season 3

"Salang Pass" is the fifth episode of third season of the American television drama series The Americans, and the 31st overall episode of the series. It originally aired on February 25, 2015, in the United States on FX. The title references the Salang Pass, located in Afghanistan.

== Plot ==
The episode opens with Philip (disguised as Clark) and Martha looking into fostering a child. Philip continues to bond with Paige, causing tension between him and Elizabeth, while at the same time working a new contact, Kimmy, the daughter of a CIA officer in the Afghanistan group who is about Paige's age. Meanwhile, Elizabeth, disguised as a recovering alcoholic, continues her friendship with Lisa as Lisa applies for a transfer to the nearby Northrop plant. Stan continues to negotiate with Oleg in an attempt to trade a suspected Soviet spy for Nina, while beginning to give up on his attempts to get back together with his wife, Sandra. Yousaf, Philip's Inter-Services Intelligence contact in the Pakistani diplomatic mission, returns to Pakistan as the fundamentalists begin to take control. Philip and Elizabeth experience tension in their marriage as Philip struggles to manage several complicated sexual relationships, including his marriage with Martha and his liaison with Kimmy.

== Production ==
The episode was written by Stephen Schiff and directed by Kevin Dowling.

== Reception ==
The episode was watched by 811,000 viewers and scored 0.19 ratings in 18–49 demographics, as per Nielsen ratings.

"Salang Pass" received positive reviews. Erik Adams of The A.V. Club gave the episode a A grade. Alan Sepinwall said "Salang Pass" became even stranger, and more powerful, and more uniquely "Americans", than almost anything the show has done before.
