= Raqeeb =

2007 film directed by Anurag Singh

Raqeeb: Rivals in Love
- Directed by: Anurag Singh
- Produced by: Raj Kanwar
- Starring: Sharman Joshi; Tanushree Dutta; Jimmy Shergill; Rahul Khanna
- Cinematography: Fuwad Khan
- Edited by: Kuldeep Mehan
- Music by: Pritam
- Production company: Filmcity
- Distributed by: Inderjit Films Combine
- Release date: 18 May 2007
- Running time: 124 minutes
- Country: India
- Language: Hindi

Raqeeb (lit. 'Enemy') is a 2007 Indian romantic thriller film directed by Anurag Singh and produced by Raj Kanwar. The film stars Sharman Joshi, Jimmy Shergill, Rahul Khanna, and Tanushree Dutta. It was released on 18 May 2007. It is an unofficial remake of 1979 American television film Murder by Natural Causes.

== Plot ==
Remo (Rahul Khanna) is a multi-millionaire simpleton. Thanks to his mischievous half-brother Siddarth (Sharman Joshi), who meets Sophie (Tanushree Dutta), he falls in love with her and marries her. Trouble starts when Sunny (Jimmy Sheirgill), Sophie's ex-boyfriend, enters the picture. Sunny and Sophie hatch a diabolical plan to kill Remo by natural means - threatening fake bullets, so that he dies in an asthmatic attack, and no suspicion is raised. Sunny fires his gun, and Remo gets killed as the bullets are real. Siddharth has set this up. It is revealed that Siddharth and Sophie are indeed in a relationship and working together by killing Remo to take revenge against his half-brother and his father. His father had an extramarital affair with another woman, causing Siddharth's mother to have a mental breakdown, sending her to a mental asylum, and now taking over his ownership money and framing Sunny for the murder. However, all the money from Remo's bank account is removed, and it is revealed that Remo is indeed alive, and all he had to do was fake his death to catch him. He, Sunny, SMS and CBI Officer Pradhan were all working together to catch him red-handed. In the climax, Siddharth and Sophie meet Remo, and officer Pradhan comes to arrest them. A fight starts between the men, fatally injuring Siddharth, while Sophie runs away and falls into an open grave. Remo looks at her and feels sorry for loving the wrong person. An enraged Siddharth comes from behind to stab Remo, but Remo dodges the attack and accidentally stabs Sophie and himself, falling into the grave, thus ending both of their lives. In the end, Remo meets his stepmother in the mental asylum, claiming he doesn't know her. When he gets into his car, he meets Sunny and thanks him for saving him from getting framed for murder. Both men shake hands.

== Cast ==
- Rahul Khanna as Remo Matthews
- Jimmy Sheirgill as Sunny Anil Khanna
- Sharman Joshi as Siddharth Verma
- Tanushree Dutta as Sophie Matthews
- Vishwajeet Pradhan as CBI Officer Pradhan
- Vivek Shauq as Shri Mismatch Sharma (SMS)
- Sherlyn Chopra in a special appearance in an item number

== Soundtrack ==
Raqeeb

Soundtrack album by Pritam
- Released: 9 April 2007
- Recorded: 15 March 2007
- Genres: Feature Film soundtrack, Rock
- Label: T-Series
- Producer: Pritam

Pritam chronology
Awarapan (2007)	Raqeeb (2007)	Bhram (2007)

Raqeeb had 8 songs composed by Pritam and written by Sameer. The album received a poor review from Glamsham.

No.	Title	Singer(s)	Length
1.	"Jaane Kaise"	K.K.	06:14
2.	"Channa Ve Channa"	Gayatri Ganjawala	04:34
3.	"Dushmana" (Female)	Sunidhi Chauhan	04:18
4.	"Tum Ho"	Tulsi Kumar, Zubeen Garg	05:37
5.	"Qatil"	Alisha Chinai	04:24
6.	"Dushmana" (Male)	Kunal Ganjawala	04:23
7.	"Channa Ve Channa" (Remix (Remixed by DJ G, Earl, Edgard G))	Gayatri Ganjawala	04:27
8.	"Jaane Kaise" (Remix (Remixed by DJ G, Earl, Edgard G))	K.K.	04:28
