= George Pendle =

British author and journalist (born 1976)

- Born: 1976 (age 49–50)
- Education: St Peter's College, Oxford
- Occupations: Author and journalist

George Pendle (born 1976) is a British author and journalist.

He was educated at Stowe School and St Peter's College, Oxford.

After working at The Times as a writer and commissioning editor from 1997 to 2001, Pendle wrote his first book, published in 2005, Strange Angel: The Otherworldly Life of Rocket Scientist John Whiteside Parsons, which became the basis for the historical drama television series Strange Angel that ran from 2018 through 2019 on CBS All Access.

Pendle's second book – The Remarkable Millard Fillmore: The Unbelievable Life of a Forgotten President (2007) is a faux-biography of the unlucky thirteenth President of the United States of America, Millard Fillmore.

His third book, Death: A Life (2008), is a comedic autobiography of the personification of Death and how he deals with his purpose, life, and love.

A collection of his non-fiction writing was released under the title Happy Failure in 2014.

From 2001 forward, Pendle has written articles for the Financial Times, the Los Angeles Times, Frieze, Cabinet Magazine, History Today, Bidoun, The Economist, Esquire, Slate, and The Guardian, among others. He is also Editor At Large for Air Mail and lives in New York City, where he has written signs for the New York City Department of Parks and Recreation.

== Bibliography ==
- Strange Angel: The Otherworldly Life of Rocket Scientist John Whiteside Parsons (2005) ISBN 0-297-84853-4
- The Remarkable Millard Fillmore: The Unbelievable Life of a Forgotten President (2007) ISBN 0-307-33962-9
- Death: A Life (2008) ISBN 978-0-307-39560-3
- Happy Failure (2014) ISBN 1-938-56016-7
- The Book of Stamps, introduction by George Pendle (New York: Cabinet Books, 2008). ISBN 9781932698398, 1932698396
