= Prisoners (Gotham) =

- Gotham episode
- Episode no.: Season 2 Episode 16
- Directed by: Scott White
- Written by: Danny Cannon
- Production code: 4X6216
- Original air date: March 28, 2016
- Running time: 44 minutes

Guest appearances
- John Doman as Carmine Falcone; Paul Reubens as Elijah Van Dahl; Melinda Clarke as Grace Van Dahl; Kaley Ronayne a Sasha Van Dahl; Justin Mark as Charles Van Dahl; Ned Bellamy as Warden Carlson Grey; Peter Mark Kendall as Peter "Puck" Davies; Marc Damon Johnson as Wilson Bishop; Christian Frazier as Henry Weaver

Episode chronology
← Previous "Mad Grey Dawn"	Next → "Into the Woods"
- Gotham season 2

"Prisoners" is the sixteenth episode of the second season, and 38th episode overall from the Fox series Gotham. The episode was written by executive producer Danny Cannon and directed by Scott White. It was first broadcast on March 28, 2016. In the episode, Gordon is sent to prison after being framed by Nygma into the murder of Theo Galavan and Carl Pinkney. Meanwhile, Cobblepot continues to bond with his father while his stepmother and step-siblings plan to kill him. This episode also has the fewest cast members as only Ben McKenzie, Donal Logue, Robin Lord Taylor and Cory Michael Smith appear.

The episode received positive reviews with critics praising Reubens' chemistry with Taylor and the episode's comparison to The Shawshank Redemption.

== Plot ==
Weeks after the previous episode, Gordon (Ben McKenzie) is adjusting to life in Blackgate Penitentiary after being framed by Nygma (Cory Michael Smith), following the same routine every day. Warden Carlson Grey (Ned Bellamy) announces to Gordon that he will be transferred to a new section, dubbed "the World's End", by the prison population, without protective custody, and with many of the criminals Gordon arrested sent there; all part of a plan by Warden Grey, a friend of former Commissioner Loeb, to kill Gordon. Gordon is constantly aided by guard Wilson Bishop (Marc Damon Johnson).

During a visit from Bullock (Donal Logue), Gordon is told that Lee (Morena Baccarin) has lost their baby and laid low. Gordon is further attacked by inmates led by Henry Weaver (Christian Frazier) while defended by convict Peter "Puck" Davies (Peter Mark Kendall). Weaver then has his henchmen beat Puck and send him to the infirmary. Puck later reveals that Gordon saved his younger sister in "Selina Kyle," and that Puck himself was arrested for stealing a car to meet his girlfriend. In a desperate attempt to save Gordon, Bullock meets with Carmine Falcone (John Doman). During a movie showing in the penitentiary, Weaver sits behind Gordon and readies a knife to stab him, but a different inmate intervenes and seemingly stabs Gordon multiple times instead. Soon after the attack, Gordon is pronounced dead. Gordon's corpse is wheeled outside Blackgate, where his death is revealed as a ruse by Bishop and Bullock. He returns to retrieve Puck, when he's confronted by Grey who is knocked unconscious by Bishop.

Meanwhile, Cobblepot (Robin Lord Taylor) continues adapting to his new lifestyle with his father (Paul Reubens). During a night, Cobblepot reveals to Dahl about his criminal activities but Dahl seems understanding and explains he forgives him. It's revealed that Grace (Melinda Clarke) has been avoiding giving Dahl his heart defect drugs. The next day, Grace tells Dahl about Cobblepot being a super villain called "the Penguin", but he doesn't change his mind about Oswald. Sasha (Kaley Ronayne) then tries to seduce Cobblepot, but he rejects her advances.

Dahl collapses in his house and is told by the doctor that his heart defect is infected and given little time to live. Upset that Cobblepot may receive what they perceive to be "their" inheritance, Grace, Sasha and Charles (Justin Mark) poison a drink for Cobblepot to ingest. Later, after Dahl states his intention to change his will in Cobblepot's favor, he drinks from the bottle and dies in Cobblepot's arms, reminiscent of his mother's death. Grace is shocked when she discovers Dahl accidentally drank from the bottle.

Bullock, Gordon and Puck reunite with Falcone on a bridge outside Gotham. Gordon is given a safe house in Gotham so he can clear his name and find Lee. However, Puck succumbs to his earlier injuries, much to Gordon's shock.

== Production ==
=== Development ===
In March 2016, it was announced that the sixteenth episode of the season would be titled "Prisoners", and was to be written by Danny Cannon, with Scott White directing.

=== Casting ===
David Mazouz, Morena Baccarin, Sean Pertwee, Erin Richards, Camren Bicondova, James Frain, Jessica Lucas, Chris Chalk, Drew Powell, Nicholas D'Agosto, and Michael Chiklis don't appear in the episode as their respective characters. This makes it the episode with the fewer cast members as only four main characters appear in the episode. In March 2016, it was announced that the guest cast for the episode would include John Doman as Carmine Falcone, Paul Reubens as Elijah Van Dahl, Melinda Clarke as Grace Van Dahl, Kaley Ronayne as Sasha Van Dahl, Justin Mark as Charles Van Dahl, Ned Bellamy as Warden Carlson Grey, Peter Mark Kendall as Peter "Puck" Davies, Marc Damon Johnson as Wilson Bishop and Christian Frazier as Henry Weaver.

== Reception ==
=== Viewers ===
The episode was watched by 3.82 million viewers with a 1.3/5 share among adults aged 18 to 49. This was a 2% decrease in viewership from the previous episode, which was watched by 3.89 million viewers. With this ratings, Gotham ranked first for FOX, beating Lucifer, fourth on its timeslot and sixth for the night on the 18-49 demographics, behind Blindspot, Scorpion, Supergirl, Dancing with the Stars, and The Voice. It was also the 24th most watched of the week in the 18-49 demographics and the 54th most watched overall in the week.

With Live+7 DVR viewing factored in, the episode had an overall rating of 5.72 million viewers, and a 2.1 in the 18–49 demographic.

=== Critical reviews ===
Professional ratings
Review scores
Source	Rating
Rotten Tomatoes (Tomatometer)	91%
Rotten Tomatoes (Average Score)	7.3
IGN	6.8
The A.V. Club	B−
TV Fanatic	4.0/5.0 stars
TV Overmind	4/5 stars

"Wrath of the Villains: Prisoners" received positive reviews from critics. The episode received a rating of 91% with an average score of 7.3 out of 10 on the review aggregator Rotten Tomatoes.

Matt Fowler of IGN gave the episode an "okay" 6.8 out of 10 and wrote in his verdict, "'Prisoners' primarily focused on Gordon and Penguin's separate stories, heaping on an impressive amount of misery while also giving us a languid episode full of predictable beats."

The A.V. Club's Kyle Fowle gave the episode a "B−" grade and wrote, "Relatively speaking, 'Wrath Of The Villains: Prisoners' is one of the more memorable — Note: memorable ≠ good — episodes of Gotham in recent memory because it isn't bogged down by all that canon superhero stuff. I've mentioned before that the show is usually too overstuffed with characters, most of whom don't even have a meaningful or engaging arc going on, to really focus in on a single story and make it have an impact. Dramatic stakes get lost in the continuous shuffle of villains and crooked cops, and the ever-shifting morality of Jim Gordon. Without those dramatic stakes Gotham ends up feeling like a parade of villains with no staying power, meaning that there's no tension to the season-long narrative, meaning that there's hardly a reason to tune in every week."

Andy Behbakht of TV Overmind gave the series a star rating of 4 out of 5, writing "Overall, despite my issue with how fast they ended the Cobblepot reunion, 'Prisoners' was a solid episode. It gave both Oswald and Gordon a lot of screentime as they have sort of taken a backseat since Hugo Strange and Mr. Freeze's introductions in the past few weeks." Robert Yaniz, Jr., writing for ScreenRant also praised the episode: "The 'Wrath of the Villains' storyline continues to unfold on Gotham, but unlike the game-changing events that took place last week, the new episode is more concerned with developing those established storylines – rather than introducing yet another future member of Batman's rogues gallery. In many ways, this one feels like a return to the season 1 dual focus on the contrasting journeys of both Gordon (Ben McKenzie) and Penguin (Robin Lord Taylor). With Gordon and Penguin as the sole focal points this week, there wasn't room for a whole lot else. The show's other major figurehead, David Mazouz's young Bruce Wayne, was nowhere to be found, as was recurring baddie Hugo Strange (B.D. Wong). However, this episode almost undoubtedly will be followed by a string of episodes that see the former continuing his criminal education and the latter kicking off his reanimation project with help from Mr. Freeze. That being said, one of the most interesting aspects of recent episodes has been the shift in Nygma (Cory Michael Smith) into full-on Riddler mode. It's an evolution that will likely be largely completed by season's end – and one that longtime fans of Gotham likely can't wait to finally see come to fruition."

Keertana Sastry of EW stated: "Monday night's episode of Gotham may have been titled 'Prisoners,' but really it should be called 'Jim Gordon and the Terrible, Horrible, No Good, Very Bad Day.' Because not only did Gordon have to tolerate several weeks at Blackgate, but he also encountered a corrupt warden, all kinds of violence, and bad news after bad news about his loved ones and friends."

Karmen Fox from The Baltimore Sun wrote positively about the episode, stating: "Was the doomed sidekick/heroic sacrifice trope necessary to help lift the guilt-ridden Jim's spirits so he could escape prison? Sure. Could the prison escape have been less over the top, without Jim running back into the infirmary to rescue Puck? Yes. Yes, please. In spite of all the schmaltziness, the episode wraps up nicely with the sun rising over Gotham's skyline. It echoed Elijah's optimistic advice to Penguin: 'The sun will come up tomorrow'. With a new day breaking, will Jim find Leigh? How will he prove his innocence? We're not sure, but at least he's not in the World’s End." Lisa Babick from TV Fanatic, gave a 4.0 star rating out of 5, stating: "Really, Gotham? How long are you going to add drama to the drama of Jim's tortured soul? There are no redeeming qualities to Jim Gordon. Forget about him saving Gotham City. He'll be lucky if he can save himself. Yes, I get the whole point of Jim's overblown drama this hour, but it still doesn't make it any less infuriating. So, Puck had to die and Lee's baby had to die just so the story could move forward, and Jim could have some new anger with which to wrap his pathetic life around? Whatever."
