= Baggage (The Americans) =

- The Americans episode
- Episode no.: Season 3 Episode 2
- Directed by: Daniel Sackheim
- Written by: Joel Fields; Joe Weisberg
- Production code: BDU302
- Original air date: February 4, 2015
- Running time: 46 minutes

Guest appearances
- Svetlana Efremova as Zinaida Preobrazhenskaya; Katja Herbers as Evi Sneijder; Rahul Khanna as Yousaf Rana; Remy Auberjonois as Arthur; Vera Cherny as Tatiana; Boris Krutonog as Igor Burov; Cotter Smith as Deputy Attorney General; Frank Langella as Gabriel

Episode chronology
← Previous "EST Men"	Next → "Open House"
- The Americans season 3

"Baggage" is the second episode of the third season of the American television drama series The Americans, and the 28th overall episode of the series. It originally aired on February 4, 2015 in the United States on FX.

== Plot ==
Elizabeth Jennings (Keri Russell) arrives at the hotel where Annelise (Gillian Alexy) was murdered by Yousaf. She and Philip (Matthew Rhys) dispose of her body by breaking her limbs and stuffing her into a suitcase. Arriving in a crate to the FBI, Zinaida Preobrazhenskaya (Svetlana Efremova), a defector from the Institute for US and Canadian Studies, is greeted by Stan Beeman (Noah Emmerich). Nina Sergeevna (Annet Mahendru), who is incarcerated at the Lefortovo Prison for treason, gets a frightened Belgian cell mate, Evi Sneijder (Katja Herbers), but Nina refuses to speak with her.

Zinaida Preobrazhenskaya discusses with Stan the Institute in Moscow she worked for, where their duties were to report on Soviet leadership on all aspects of geopolitical significance regarding the U.S. and Canada. She confides in Stan that she is glad that it is over, but he assures her that it is not. In a flashback to her childhood, Elizabeth remembers her mother telling her that her father was a deserter who was shot and killed. Philip meets Yousaf (Rahul Khanna) and they briefly discuss Annelise. Philip tells Yousaf that he needs the names of members working in the CIA Afghanistan group, when Philip suggests he arrange a meeting with them.

Stan is held at gunpoint by Oleg Igorevich Burov (Costa Ronin), who blames him for Nina's arrest and upcoming execution. Stan tells him that he loved Nina and, if Oleg wants to shoot him, he can shoot him in the back and Stan walks away. Philip confronts Elizabeth about her plan to induct Paige (Holly Taylor) into the KGB and talks about Annelise's death, saying it could happen to Paige. A distraught Stan visits with Sandra (Susan Misner) to discuss being held up. She comforts him, but tells him she is not coming back to him.

Philip and Elizabeth make arrangements for Yousaf's meeting, in which Philip will identify the members of the Afghan group and their license plates. At a motel, in separate rooms, Philip and Elizabeth monitor the meeting; but, when Yousaf and an unidentified man get into a car, Elizabeth tails them, against Philip's wishes. They meet up and Elizabeth tells Philip that they need to go to the bar themselves where the meeting takes place, where Philip takes photographs of the meeting.

Nina has a meeting with Oleg's father, who tells her that Oleg has asked for his help in saving her. She asks him to deliver a message that she was not pretending when they were together. At their office, Philip and Elizabeth discuss what they will do about Paige. Elizabeth tells him of the day she broke the rules and told her mother she was headhunted by the KGB; her mother did not blink and told her to serve her country.

== Production ==
The episode was written by Joel Fields and series creator Joe Weisberg and directed by Daniel Sackheim.

== Reception ==
The episode was watched by 918,000 viewers and scored 0.3 ratings in 18–49 demographics, as per Nielsen ratings. "Baggage" received positive reviews. Erik Adams of The A.V. Club gave the episode a B+ grade. Alan Sepinwall reviewed the episode positively and praised Noah Emmerich's performance.
