= Born Again (The Americans) =

- The Americans episode
- Episode no.: Season 3 Episode 6
- Directed by: Kevin Dowling
- Written by: Tracey Scott Wilson
- Production code: BDU306
- Original air date: March 4, 2015
- Running time: 41 minutes

Episode chronology
← Previous "Salang Pass"	Next → "Walter Taffet"
- The Americans season 3

"Born Again" is the sixth episode of third season of the American television drama series The Americans, and the 32nd overall episode of the series. It originally aired on March 4, 2015 in the United States on FX.

== Plot ==
Paige gets baptized by Pastor Tim, with Philip and Elizabeth in attendance. Later, Tori and Stan have dinner at the Jennings house, and despite his admitting that he still considers Sandra his wife, he and Tori have sex. Stan later invites his estranged wife to the memorial service of one of his colleagues who they were friends with.

Philip distracts Kimmy while visiting so an associate can bug her father's work bag. Kimmy tries to seduce Philip, but Philip stops the attempt, citing his return to church. Gabriel informs Philip that because of the deteriorating situation in the Soviet–Afghan War, he is being ordered to increase his visits to Kimmy to check the taps from monthly to weekly. Philip is initially hesitant because of Kimmy's age, but agrees when Gabriel tells him that his other son is now a soldier in Afghanistan. Philip returns to Kimmy and reconciles, citing unease with having fathered a kid young and they pray together for his son.

Meanwhile, Nina portrays herself as vulnerable to get Evi to confess about her boyfriend's treason. Nina gets rewarded with a meal and Evi gets taken away.

Elizabeth takes Paige to Kenilworth and says that she and Philip had worked with Gregory Thomas in the civil rights movement before she was born and that they were more similar to her than she realizes.

== Production ==
The episode was written by Tracey Scott Wilson and directed by Kevin Dowling.

== Reception ==
The episode was watched by 930,000 viewers and scored 0.24 ratings in 18–49 demographics, as per Nielsen ratings.

"Born Again" received positive reviews. Erik Adams of The A.V. Club gave the episode a B+ grade. Alan Sepinwall also reviewed it positively.
