= Stingers (The Americans) =

- The Americans episode
- Episode no.: Season 3 Episode 10
- Directed by: Larysa Kondracki
- Written by: Joel Fields; Joe Weisberg
- Cinematography by: Richard Rutkowski
- Editing by: Daniel Valverde
- Production code: BDU310
- Original air date: April 1, 2015
- Running time: 47 minutes

Guest appearances
- Michael Aronov as Anton Baklanov; Svetlana Efremova as Zinaida Preobrazhenskaya; Julia Garner as Kimberly Breland; Jefferson Mays as Walter Taffet; Kelly AuCoin as Pastor Tim; Vera Cherny as Tatiana Evgenyevna Vyazemtseva; Brandon J. Dirden as Dennis Aderholt; Bill Heck as Neil; Frank Langella as Gabriel

Episode chronology
← Previous "Do Mail Robots Dream of Electric Sheep?"	Next → "One Day in the Life of Anton Baklanov"
- The Americans season 3

"Stingers" is the tenth episode of the third season of the American period spy drama television series The Americans. It is the 36th overall episode of the series and was written by executive producer Joel Fields and series creator Joe Weisberg, and directed by Larysa Kondracki. It was released on FX on April 1, 2015.

The series is set during the Cold War and follows Elizabeth and Philip Jennings, two Soviet KGB intelligence officers posing as an American married couple living in Falls Church, a Virginia suburb of Washington, D.C., with their American-born children Paige and Henry. It also explores the conflict between Washington's FBI office and the KGB Rezidentura there, from the perspectives of agents on both sides, including the Jennings' neighbor Stan Beeman, an FBI agent working in counterintelligence. In the episode, Philip and Elizabeth investigate an incoming arrival to the United States, while Paige decides to question her parents' real life.

According to Nielsen Media Research, the episode was seen by an estimated 0.90 million household viewers and gained a 0.3 ratings share among adults aged 18–49. The episode received critical acclaim, with critics praising the confession scene, with many feeling that it will change the course of the series.

== Plot ==
Pastor Tim (Kelly AuCoin) visits Philip (Matthew Rhys) at the travel agency to schedule a church trip to Kenya for missionary work. He invites Philip to join them, but he declines.

While accompanying Stan (Noah Emmerich) to watch Tootsie, Zinaida (Svetlana Efremova) leaves for the bathroom. There, she leaves a message under the sink, revealing her status as double agent. The message is for Arkady (Lev Gorn), claiming that a KGB agent is pressuring her in recanting her own statement. Philip is called to retrieve Kimmy (Julia Garner) from a party after she drinks too much alcohol. He takes her home, where she claims that he is her only trustworthy friend. While she is in the bathroom, Philip retrieves a tape from Kimmy's father and leaves. He shows the tape to Elizabeth (Keri Russell), which reveals that Pakistan is sending an ISI representative to investigate United States' role in the Soviet–Afghan War.

At the Soviet facility, Nina (Annet Mahendru) continues working for Anton Baklanov (Michael Aronov). She finally gets him to trust her by explaining his concerns; he needs photographs to aid his work. Stan starts spending more time with Henry, giving him a bootleg VHS of Tron and introducing him to a football board game in his house. As part of the operation, Philip and Elizabeth watch over a hotel where CIA officers are meeting with the Mujahideen, locating the room where the meeting is set to take place.

After being convinced by Pastor Tim in speaking up, Paige (Holly Taylor) asks her parents about their life, feeling it is not normal. They then reveal their identities as Soviet spies, shocking her. As she leaves, Philip tells her that she cannot tell anyone, not even Henry, as they could be sent to prison for treason. Per her request, they decide to let her have some time alone while they go to work at the travel agency. That night, Stan joins the Jennings for dinner. He notes Paige's behavior, with Philip referring to her baptism as a cause for her change of behavior.

== Production ==
=== Development ===
In March 2015, FX confirmed that the tenth episode of the season would be titled "Stingers", and that it would be written by executive producer Joel Fields and series creator Joe Weisberg, and directed by Larysa Kondracki. This was Fields' eleventh writing credit, Weisberg's twelfth writing credit, and Kondracki's first directing credit.

== Reception ==
=== Viewers ===
In its original American broadcast, "Stingers" was seen by an estimated 0.90 million household viewers with a 0.3 in the 18-49 demographics. This means that 0.3 percent of all households with televisions watched the episode. This was a 10% decrease in viewership from the previous episode, which was watched by 0.99 million household viewers with a 0.3 in the 18-49 demographics.

=== Critical reviews ===
"Stingers" received critical acclaim. Eric Goldman of IGN gave the episode an "amazing" 9.5 out of 10 and wrote in his verdict, "A can't-miss episode of The Americans finally had Paige learn the truth. Now of course we anxiously await what the fallout is and what Paige does with this information. This season continues to be stellar TV and it was great news to hear The Americans was renewed for Season 4 this week."

Libby Hill of The A.V. Club gave the episode an "A–" grade and wrote, "It's important to choose family in the big moments, but 'Stinger' was also about all the ways that choosing your family matters in the small moments as well."

Alan Sepinwall of HitFix wrote, "There's a whole lot of business to be dealt with in the season's remaining three chapters, but with this week's renewal, we know there will be a lot more told of this strange new family dynamic. I can't wait." Joshua Rivera of Entertainment Weekly wrote, "And just like that, one of the biggest pressure valves on The Americans bursts open."

Laura Hudson of Vulture gave the episode a 4 star rating out of 5 and wrote, "The most dramatic changes in life don't always happen in the form of a car crash, a gunshot, or an explosion. Sometimes it's just a phone call, or a knock on the door, or an email that pops up in your inbox. Last night on The Americans, the biggest seismic change in the season — hell, maybe in the entire series — happened because a teenage girl asked a question, and her parents sat down and quietly told her the truth." Alec Bojalad of Den of Geek gave the episode a 4.5 star rating out of 5 and wrote, "Certain episodes throughout a season will be great but the 'big' stuff will always be saved for a season finale cliffhanger. And some expected events are so big you don't even expect them until even a season or two later. 'Stingers' features one of those 'everything changes' events... with three full episodes in the third season to go."

Ben Travers of IndieWire gave the episode an "A" grade and wrote, "'Stingers' will always be remembered as the episode where Philip and Elizabeth finally told Paige the truth about their family. The significance was incredibly clear in every aspect of the scene, from Paige's defiant and direct confrontation, to her parents' rationalized, well-meaning response, to the setting of the perfectly-domestic kitchen table, to the tense framing of the direction. It was an all-in-all perfect scene, and one that will change the course of the series forever." Matt Brennan of Slant Magazine wrote, "Rather ingeniously, then, 'Stingers' deploys the recent distractions of mail robots and anti-apartheid agitators to surprise the viewer as surely as Paige surprises her parents: When the truth comes out, it does so without warning, a reminder of the consequences the characters face when they let their attention drift."
