= Killer by Nature =

- Film poster
- Directed by: Douglas S. Younglove
- Written by: Douglas S. Younglove
- Produced by: Valerie McCaffrey; Rebekah Sindoris; Douglas S. Younglove
- Starring: Ron Perlman; Armand Assante
- Cinematography: Ben Kufrin
- Edited by: Andy Horvitch
- Music by: Veigar Margeirsson
- Production company: Daydreamin' Pictures
- Distributed by: Bleiberg Entertainment
- Release date: February 14, 2012
- Running time: 94 minutes
- Country: United States
- Language: English

Killer by Nature is a 2012 American thriller film starring Ron Perlman and Armand Assante.

== Plot ==
Horrific murders which once lived only in a young man's nightmares suddenly begin occurring in chilling reality in his hometown.

== Cast ==
- Zachary Ray Sherman as Owen
- Ron Perlman as Dr. Julian
- Armand Assante as Eugene Branch
- Lin Shaye as Leona
- Haley Hudson as Maggie
- Richard Riehle as Warden Upton
- Richard Portnow as Walter
- Svetlana Efremova as Dr. Ramos
- Jason Hildebrandt as Detective Marc Houlihan
- Ron McCoy as Harvey
- Lee de Broux as Medical Examiner
- Michael A. Hamilton as Mystery Boy
- Joe Taylor as Medical Examiner
