= Walter Taffet =

- The Americans episode
- Episode no.: Season 3 Episode 7
- Directed by: Noah Emmerich
- Written by: Lara Shapiro
- Production code: BDU307
- Original air date: March 11, 2015
- Running time: 45 minutes

Episode chronology
← Previous "Born Again"	Next → "Divestment"
- The Americans season 3

"Walter Taffet" is the seventh episode of third season of the American television drama series The Americans, and the 33rd overall episode of the series. It originally aired on March 11, 2015, in the United States on FX.

== Plot ==
At the FBI, Agent Aderholt discovers that Gaad’s pen has been bugged. Martha, who planted the device under the pretext of a classified audit of the bureau for her husband Clark (Philip Jennings in disguise), overhears this and panics, destroying the transmitter concealed in her purse, escaping a bug sweep of the offices.

Philip pretends to be Elizabeth's new love interest to Northrop employee Liza on a date. Philip then leaves to meet Martha as her husband Clark, but she hesitates to tell him about the incident. Sensing that something is amiss, she asks to see his apartment, which she had not previously visited.

Hans discovers that a fellow South African student, Todd, is planning an attack on Georgetown campus to frame student anti-apartheid activists in conjunction with Eugene Venter, a South African intelligence officer, with the intention of blaming it on student anti-apartheid protesters. Philip spies on Todd at a diner, where he is waiting for Venter. Philip and Elizabeth abduct Venter outside the diner.

== Production ==
=== Development ===
In February 2015, FX confirmed that the seventh episode of the season would be titled "Walter Taffet", and that it would be written by Lara Shapiro, and directed by Noah Emmerich. This was Shapiro's first writing credit, and Emmerich's first directing credit.

Emmerich was interested in directing since the first season. On the advice of the crew, he spent the second half of the first season and the entire second season to prepare. For this, he shadowed the actors and watched the process of the production, for which he was granted the opportunity to direct for the third season. He explained, "I guess the most overwhelming takeaway is how many moving parts and how much work it is to get them all aligned and working together and how much work it is."

== Reception ==
=== Viewers ===
In its original American broadcast, "Walter Taffet" was seen by an estimated 1.22 million household viewers with a 0.4 in the 18–49 demographics. This means that 0.4 percent of all households with televisions watched the episode. This was a 31% increase in viewership from the previous episode, which was watched by 0.93 million household viewers with a 0.2 in the 18–49 demographics.

=== Critical reviews ===
"Walter Taffet" received extremely positive reviews from critics. Alan Sepinwall of HitFix wrote, "As a rookie Americans director, Emmerich acquitted himself well throughout the hour, but particularly in the sequence where Martha realizes that Aderholt, Gaad and Stan have discovered the bug she planted in Gaad's office on behalf of Clark."

Erik Adams of The A.V. Club gave the episode an "A" grade and praised Emmerich's directing, "He acquits himself marvelously, probably because he's working off such a strong template. It also helps that Emmerich was handed season three's second firecracker of an episode." Laura Hudson of Vulture wrote, "This season of The Americans has often felt ominously smooth, as though its characters were in the midst of a slow-motion fishtail toward some unknown catastrophe. I suspect that later, when we look back, this will be the episode where things really start to turn."
