= EST Men =

- The Americans episode
- Episode no.: Season 3 Episode 1
- Directed by: Daniel Sackheim
- Written by: Joel Fields; Joe Weisberg
- Production code: BDU301
- Original air date: January 28, 2015
- Running time: 46 minutes

Guest appearances
- Gillian Alexy as Annelise; Brandon J. Dirden as Agent Dennis Aderholt; Rahul Khanna as Yousaf; Kelly AuCoin as Pastor Tim; Jordan Baker as Charlotte; Cotter Smith as Deputy Attorney General; Frank Langella as Gabriel

Episode chronology
← Previous "Echo"	Next → "Baggage"
- The Americans season 3

"EST Men" is the third season premiere of the American television drama series The Americans, and the 27th overall episode of the series. It originally aired on January 28, 2015 in the United States on FX.

== Plot ==
Elizabeth Jennings meets an ex-CIA analyst, who is willing to share a list of CIA operatives in Afghanistan, but after feeling guilty, confesses her indiscretion via telephone and tries to waylay Elizabeth until the authorities arrive. Elizabeth is chased by Frank Gaad and his associate. After fighting with them, she manages to escape with minor injuries, but loses the operatives list in the process. Gaad also informs Stan that Nina has been charged with espionage and treason.

Philip and Elizabeth meet Gabriel (Frank Langella), their mentor and original contact with The Centre, who tries to persuade them to recruit Paige. Elizabeth describes how she and Paige are attending Paige's church together and that they have grown closer. She says Paige is open to new ideas and ideologies, and that she and Philip are slowly laying the groundwork for telling Paige their true identities. Later, Philip and Elizabeth argue over whether Paige should be recruited and whether or not Elizabeth is assessing her abilities for The Centre. Gabriel also gives Elizabeth a cassette tape with a recording made by her mother, in which her mother says she is dying.

Stan Beeman attends EST along with Philip, but is annoyed with it and finds it stupid. He tries to give Sandra the impression he is open to EST, but when Sandra tells him to tell the truth, he confesses that he did not like it. Arkady Ivanovich and Oleg Igorevich discuss if they can help Nina; Oleg has begged his well-connected father to intervene to no avail. Oleg is later shown tailing Stan.

Philip continues to persuade Annelise to extract information from Yousaf, and she agrees, but expresses doubts and tells Philip she is in love with Yousaf. Later, while she and Yousaf are having sex, she confesses that she has a secret but swears she is on Yousaf's side. Overcome with rage, Yousaf strangles her. Philip, listening in the next room, catches him in the act but is unable to save Annelise. Outraged at first, he controls himself and promises Yousaf that he can make the problem go away.

== Production ==
The episode was written by Joel Fields and series creator Joe Weisberg and directed by Daniel Sackheim. The episode marks the first appearance of Frank Langella as Gabriel, mentor of Elizabeth and Philip. Beginning with this episode, Lev Gorn, Costa Ronin, and Richard Thomas are credited as series regulars.

== Reception ==
The episode was watched by 1.895 million viewers and scored 0.6 ratings in 18–49 demographics, as per Nielsen ratings. The critics reviewed the episode positively. The A.V. Club gave the episode an A−. Alan Sepinwall from Hitfix reviewed the episode positively. TV.com wrote that "EST Men was mainly a set-up/catch-up hour, but it unfolded in the taut fashion The Americans has come to perfect, and that's kind of all it needed to do."
