= Into the Woods (Gotham) =

- Gotham episode
- Episode no.: Season 2 Episode 17
- Directed by: Oz Scott
- Written by: Rebecca Perry Cutter
- Production code: 4X6217
- Original air date: April 11, 2016
- Running time: 44 minutes

Guest appearances
- B. D. Wong as Dr. Hugo Strange; Tonya Pinkins as Ethel Peabody; Melinda Clarke as Grace Van Dahl; Kaley Ronayne as Sasha Van Dahl; Justin Mark as Charles Van Dahl

Episode chronology
← Previous "Prisoners"	Next → "Pinewood"
- Gotham season 2

"Into the Woods" is the seventeenth episode of the second season, and 39th episode overall from the Fox series Gotham. The episode was written by producer Rebecca Perry Cutter and directed by Oz Scott. It was first broadcast on April 11, 2016. In the episode, Jim Gordon tries to clear his name after having escaping from Blackgate Penitentiary with help from Edward Nygma, not knowing Nygma is the one who set him up.

The episode received series low ratings and received mixed-to-positive reviews, with critics praising Gordon and Nygma's confrontation.

== Plot ==
Bruce (David Mazouz) and Selina (Camren Bicondova) steal money from a thief. While fleeing on rooftops, Bruce purposefully spills out most of the money to the street below. He justifies this to Selina, saying he is mainly doing research on Gotham crime, which angers her. Hearing news about Gordon's escape, Barnes (Michael Chiklis) confronts Harvey Bullock (Donal Logue) about sheltering Gordon, but he denies any involvement. At Arkham Asylum, Professor Hugo Strange (B. D. Wong) decides to release Barbara Kean (Erin Richards) after she shows no signs of mental illness, feeling it is best to observe her new behavior rather than experimenting on her.

Bullock reveals that IA secretly records all anonymous tips and uses his connection with a woman at IA so Gordon can retrieve the tape. The voice on the tape is distorted so he goes to Edward Nygma (Cory Michael Smith) for help, but Edward says he finds no evidence on the tape. Gordon initially deduces the culprit may be former Commissioner Loeb's corrupt cops, whom he calls "psycho", which draws ire from Nygma. After finally listening to the tape, Gordon realizes Nygma is the real culprit and holds him at gunpoint. However, Nygma previously developed a device that he placed under Gordon's seat, which he subsequently uses to shock and knock him out.

Gordon wakes up and successfully escapes from Nygma. Shaking off Nygma's pursuit, Gordon reaches Bruce and Selina's hideout and collapses. The two take Gordon to Wayne Manor to be tended by Alfred (Sean Pertwee) and Bruce. Thinking of a way to lure out Nygma, Gordon sends Selina to the GCPD to put out false reports about him visiting Oswald Cobblepot (Robin Lord Taylor). This panics Nygma, which makes him go to the woods and dig up Kristen Kringle's corpse where Gordon confronts him. Nygma retrieves his gun and confesses to the murders before they're surrounded by the GCPD including Barnes and Bullock. Nygma is arrested and taken to Arkham Asylum.

Meanwhile, Cobblepot and the Dahl family attend his father Elijah's funeral. Not wanting to be left on the streets, Cobblepot works as a housekeeper at the mansion for the Dahls. They treat him poorly over a few days, until he discovers the poison they used to kill his father. While serving dinner to Grace (Melinda Clarke), Cobblepot reveals he discovered the bottle. To Grace's horror, Cobblepot reveals that her dinner is the remains of her children. He kills Grace shortly after.

At the GCPD, Barnes apologizes to Gordon and gives him Lee's (Morena Baccarin) number, who's working for a medical examiner in the South. Gordon then decides to continue investigating the Waynes' murder to find out who contracted Matches Malone to do it. Bruce discovers his father's computer was fixed and decides to stay, causing Selina to leave angrily. Bruce and Alfred examine the computer, while Gordon calls Lee but decides not to speak. Someone knocks at his door and Gordon opens it, to reveal Barbara.

== Production ==
=== Development ===
In March 2016, it was announced that the seventeenth episode of the season would be titled "Into the Woods", and was to be written by Rebecca Perry Cutter, with Oz Scott directing.

=== Casting ===
James Frain, Jessica Lucas, Chris Chalk, Drew Powell, and Nicholas D'Agosto don't appear in the episode as their respective characters. In March 2016, it was announced that the guest cast for the episode would include B. D. Wong as Professor Hugo Strange, Tonya Pinkins as Ethel Peabody, Melinda Clarke as Grace Van Dahl, Kaley Ronayne as Sasha Van Dahl and Justin Mark as Charles Van Dahl.

== Reception ==
=== Viewers ===
The episode was watched by 3.71 million viewers with a 1.3/5 share among adults aged 18 to 49, marking a third consecutive series low. This was a 3% decrease in viewership from the previous episode, which was watched by 3.82 million viewers. With this ratings, Gotham ranked first for FOX, beating Lucifer, fourth on its timeslot and seventh for the night on the 18-49 demographics, behind Supergirl, NCIS: Los Angeles, Blindspot, Scorpion, Dancing with the Stars, and The Voice.

It was also the 28th most watched of the week in the 18-49 demographics and the 57th most watched overall in the week. With Live+7 DVR viewing factored in, the episode had an overall rating of 5.78 million viewers, and a 2.1 in the 18–49 demographic.

=== Critical reviews ===
Professional ratings
Review scores
Source	Rating
Rotten Tomatoes (Tomatometer)	78%
Rotten Tomatoes (Average Score)	7.6
IGN	7.8
The A.V. Club	C+
TV Fanatic	3.8/5 stars
TV Overmind	3.5/5.0 stars

"Wrath of the Villains: Into the Woods" received positive reviews from critics. The episode received a rating of 78% with an average score of 7.6 out of 10 on the review aggregator Rotten Tomatoes.

Matt Fowler of IGN gave the episode a "good" 7.8 out of 10 and wrote in his verdict, "'Into the Woods' was one of Gotham's biggest payoff episodes to date. Whether you're a fan of Gordon or not, Nygma's spiral here, and eventual arrest, felt meaningful given how much time we've invested in Ed since the start of the show."

The A.V. Club's Kyle Fowle gave the episode a "C+" grade and wrote, "Despite all the side plots and divergences and the over-abundance of villains, the second season of Gotham has been preoccupied with a single theme: is Jim Gordon any better than the people he's putting behind bars? It's a familiar trope in a variety of mediums, and for good reason. There's something compelling about considering how good and evil is a sliding scale, how all actions can fall in a morally grey area. For the most part, Gotham has failed to meaningfully engage with the very theme it seems so preoccupied with, too often giving Gordon a pass within the narrative. Sure, Gordon went to prison, but the stakes weren't all that high. The show mostly glossed over the death of Galavan, meaning that Gordon's murderous moment has never really been reckoned with. In fact, the show has gone out of its way to construct a frame job that merely distracts from the fact that Gordon actually killed someone in cold blood, and 'Wrath Of The Villains: Into The Woods' continues Gotham's recent streak of failing to really deal with Gordon's shoddy morality while indulging in seemingly meaningless and plodding subplots."

Andy Behbakht of TV Overmind gave the series a star rating of 3.5 out of 5, writing "Overall, while I got issues with the pacing of some great storylines that would have kept me focused for several weeks, 'Into the Woods' was a solid episode that will hopefully lead into some even more powerful stories in these remaining episodes. Also, have I mentioned how deliciously evil Hugo Strange is? Because he totally is." Robert Yaniz, Jr., writing for ScreenRant also praised the episode: "Gotham feels like it’s back on track this week, following Gordon's (Ben McKenzie) prison escape in the previous episode. A number of ongoing storylines — including one huge development — leapt forward, and the pieces feel as if they're falling into place for the final stretch of episodes that will wrap up season 2. Needless to say, it was a red-letter week for Gotham fans, especially those hoping to see much, much more of Edward Nygma (Cory Michael Smith)."

Keertana Sastry of EW stated: "Let's just cut to the chase. There's one very big moral to Monday night's episode of Gotham: A leopard can't change its spots. And boy was this adage on display in a big, big way. Oswald Cobblepot learned the truth behind his beloved father's demise and reverted to his Penguin-ish ways; after being released from Arkham, Barbara Kean immediately visited an old psychotic break-inducing friend; and Ed went full Riddler despite having the upper hand against Gordon during his hunt for the man who framed him."

Vinnie Mancuso from New York Observer wrote positively about the episode, stating: "What a weird fuc*ing Gotham, huh? 'Into the Woods' – you may recognize the Sondheim musical, or the film version where Johnny Depp wandered onto set in a werewolf costume he happened to be wearing that day – was one of those episodes where some truly sloppy material was elevated by the cast's willingness to take their balls and bring them to the walls. So in lieu of my normally rigid and formal recapping style that in no way is built on a foundation of Batman penis jokes, allow me simply to A) Point out why a plot point from 'Into the Woods' was either dumb or pointless and B) Why it brought me unmitigated joy regardless." Lisa Babick from TV Fanatic, gave a 3.8 star rating out of 5, stating: "What a cuckoo kind of hour. I'm sort of disappointed that Nygma was such an easy catch. You'd think after a nearly two year slow-burn kind of villain-y buildup, that it would take more than a light bulb going off above Jim's head to take the guy down."
