= Strange Angel =

American historical drama streaming television series

- Genre: Historical period drama
- Created by: Mark Heyman
- Based on: Strange Angel: The Otherworldly Life of Rocket Scientist; John Whiteside Parsons by George Pendle
- Starring: Jack Reynor; Bella Heathcote; Peter Mark Kendall; Rade Šerbedžija; Greg Wise; Rupert Friend
- Composer: Daniel Hart
- Country of origin: United States
- Original language: English
- No. of seasons: 2
- No. of episodes: 17

Production
- Executive producers: David Lowery; David W. Zucker; Ridley Scott; David DiGilio; Mark Heyman
- Producers: David A. Rosemont; Allison Miller
- Cinematography: Andrew Droz Palermo; Polly Morgan; David Klein
- Editors: Sue Blainey; Jennifer Barbot; Christopher S. Capp
- Camera setup: Single-camera
- Running time: 46–54 minutes
- Production companies: Scott Free Productions; Sailor Bear; DiGilio Films; Pantalone Films; CBS Television Studios

Original release
- Network: CBS All Access
- Release: June 14, 2018 – July 25, 2019

Strange Angel is an American historical drama television series that premiered on June 14, 2018, on CBS All Access. The series is based on the biography of Thelemic magician and scientist Jack Parsons (Strange Angel: The Otherworldly Life of Rocket Scientist John Whiteside Parsons by George Pendle), and was created by Mark Heyman, who also executive produces and writes for the show. On October 29, 2018, it was announced that CBS All Access had renewed the series for a second season that premiered on June 13, 2019. In November 2019, the series was canceled after two seasons.

== Premise ==
Strange Angel follows Jack Parsons, a brilliant and ambitious blue-collar worker of 1930s Los Angeles who started as a janitor at a chemical factory but had fantastical dreams that led him to birth the unknown discipline of American rocketry. Along the way, he fell into a mysterious world that included sex magic rituals at night, and he became a disciple of occultist Aleister Crowley. Parsons used Crowley's teachings of self-actualization to support his unimaginable and unprecedented endeavor to the stars.

== Cast and characters ==
=== Main ===
- Jack Reynor as Jack Parsons
- Bella Heathcote as Susan Parsons
- Peter Mark Kendall as Richard Onsted
- Greg Wise as Alfred Miller, the magus
- Rupert Friend as Ernest Donovan
- Rade Šerbedžija as Prof. Filip Mešulam
- Zack Pearlman as Samson Hunt
- Keye Chen as Gui Chiang
- Laine Neil as Patty Byrne (season 2; recurring season 1), Susan's younger half-sister.

=== Recurring ===
- Michael Gaston as Virgil Byrne, Susan's step-father.
- Dan Donohue as Professor John Tillman
- Karl Makinen as General Braxton
- Amara Zaragoza as Joan
- Rob Zabrecky as The Minder
- Louis Mustillo as Humphrey
- Randy Oglesby as Father Shelby
- Veronica Osorio as Marisol
- Elena Satine as Maggie Donovan
- Phil Abrams as Professor Gilford Crompton
- David Wells as Professor George Cleveland
- Kerry O'Malley as Mrs. Byrne, Susan's mother.
- Travina Springer as Alice
- Hope Davis as Ruth Parsons, Jack's mother.
- Colleen Foy as Cassandra
- Lyliana Wray as Young Susan
- Stewart Skelton as Provost
- Todd Stashwick as Marvel Parsons, Jack's father.
- Josh Zuckerman as Marvin Nickels

=== Guest ===
- Eugene Cordero as Pueblo Powder Company Employee ("Augurs of Spring")
- Texas Battle as Murphy ("Ritual of the Rival Tribes")
- Michael Spellman as Earl Kynett ("The Sage")
- Michael Balin as Aleister Crowley ("The Sacrificial Dance")
- Angus Macfadyen as Aleister Crowley ("The Magus")
- Daniel Abeles as L. Ron Hubbard ("Aeon")

== Episodes ==
Season	Episodes	Originally released	
Season	Episodes	First released	Last released
1	10	June 14, 2018	August 16, 2018
2	7	June 13, 2019	July 25, 2019

=== Season 1 (2018) ===
No. overall	No. in season	Title	Directed by	Written by	Original release date
1	1	"Augurs of Spring"	David Lowery	Mark Heyman	June 14, 2018
2	2	"Ritual of Abduction"	David Lowery	Mark Heyman	June 21, 2018
3	3	"Ritual of the Rival Tribes"	Tucker Gates	Allison Miller	June 28, 2018
4	4	"The Sage"	Nelson McCormick	David DiGilio	July 5, 2018
5	5	"Dance of the Earth"	Matt Shakman	Dana Adam Shapiro	July 12, 2018
6	6	"The Mystic Circle of Young Girls"	Ben Wheatley	Silka Luisa	July 19, 2018
7	7	"Glorification of the Chosen One"	Meera Menon	John Lopez	July 26, 2018
8	8	"Evocation of the Elders"	Steph Green	David Wiener	August 2, 2018
9	9	"Sacrament of the Ancestors"	Ernest R. Dickerson	Mark Heyman	August 9, 2018
10	10	"The Sacrificial Dance"	Kate Dennis	Mark Heyman	August 16, 2018

=== Season 2 (2019) ===
No. overall	No. in season	Title	Directed by	Written by	Original release date
11	1	"The Fool"	Ben Wheatley	Mark Heyman	June 13, 2019
12	2	"The Magus"	Ben Wheatley	Teleplay by : Sarah Byrd & Mark Heyman; Story by : Sarah Byrd	June 20, 2019
13	3	"The Lovers"	Mark Heyman	David DiGilio	June 27, 2019
14	4	"The Wheel of Fortune"	Sarah Boyd	John Lopez	July 4, 2019
15	5	"The Hanged Man"	Christina Choe	Teleplay by : Dana Adam Shapiro; Story by : Dana Adam Shapiro & Sarah Byrd	July 11, 2019
16	6	"The Tower"	Sylvain White	Dagny Atencio Looper	July 18, 2019
17	7	"Aeon"	Brooke Kennedy	Mark Heyman	July 25, 2019

== Production ==
Promotional poster featuring Jack Reynor as Jack Parsons.

=== Development ===
On October 15, 2014, it was reported that Mark Heyman was writing a television series adaptation of Strange Angel: The Otherworldly Life of Rocket Scientist John Whiteside Parsons by George Pendle for AMC. The series was set to be produced by Ridley Scott and his Scott Free Productions through their first-look deal at the network. By 2016, the series had advanced as far as setting up a writers room and producing multiple scripts for series consideration. AMC ultimately did not proceed with the production.

On August 1, 2017, the project was ordered to series by CBS All Access. The scripts completed for the series while under development at AMC were expected to be utilized after a deal was struck between CBS and AMC. On December 11, 2017, it was reported that the production had been selected to receive California tax credits with the series' credit being around $7.846 million.

On April 19, 2018, it was announced that the series was set to premiere on June 14, 2018. The first season, consisting of ten episodes, was expected to see each episode released weekly on Thursdays. On October 29, 2018, it was announced that CBS All Access had renewed the series for a second season. On December 10, 2018, it was reported that the second season would receive $10.6 million in tax credits from the state of California.

On April 18, 2019, it was announced that the second season would premiere on June 13, 2019. On November 26, 2019, CBS All Access canceled the series after two seasons.

=== Casting ===
On January 5, 2018, it was announced that Jack Reynor had been cast in the series lead role of Jack Parsons. On January 17, 2018, it was announced that Rupert Friend had joined the main cast in the role of Ernest Donovan. On February 13, 2018, it was announced that Bella Heathcote had been cast in the series' lead female role of Susan Parsons. On February 16, 2018, it was reported that six actors had been added to the series' cast including Peter Mark Kendall, Michael Gaston, Greg Wise, Rade Šerbedžija, Zack Pearlman, and Keye Chen. In March 2018, it was announced that Laine Neil and Elena Satine had joined the series in recurring roles. On April 4, 2018, it was reported that Karl Makinen was joining the series a recurring capacity. On April 23, 2019, Laine Neil was promoted to series regular for season 2.

== Release ==
=== Marketing ===
The first trailer for the series was released alongside a promotional poster on May 1, 2018. On May 23, 2018, a second trailer was released.

=== Premiere ===
On June 4, 2018, the series held its official premiere at the Avalon Hollywood in Los Angeles, California. The event was attended by cast members, including Jack Reynor, Bella Heathcote, Zack Pearlman, Elena Satine, Keye Chen, Greg Wise, and Rupert Friend.

== Reception ==
On the review aggregation website Rotten Tomatoes, the first season holds a 71% approval rating with an average rating of 6.59 out of 10 based on 17 reviews. The website's critical consensus reads, "A beautiful slow burn, Strange Angel shoots for the stars, but gets a little lost in its own orbit." Metacritic, which uses a weighted average, assigned the season a score of 58 out of 100 based on 9 critics, indicating "mixed or average reviews".
