= Elaan (2005 film) =

2005 Indian film by Vikram Bhatt

- Theatrical release poster
- Directed by: Vikram Bhatt
- Written by: Robin Bhatt; Vikram Bhatt; Girish Dhamjia
- Produced by: Ganesh Jain; Ratan Jain
- Starring: Mithun Chakraborty; Rahul Khanna; Arjun Rampal; Ameesha Patel; John Abraham; Lara Dutta
- Cinematography: Pravin Bhatt
- Edited by: Kuldeep Mehan
- Music by: Anu Malik
- Distributed by: Venus Records & Tapes
- Release date: 14 January 2005
- Running time: 159 minutes
- Country: India
- Language: Hindi

Elaan (Hindi pronunciation: [ʔeːlaːn]; transl. Declaration or Announcement) is a 2005 Indian Hindi-language action thriller film written and directed by Vikram Bhatt and produced by Ganesh and Ratan Jain. It is based on five people and their plan against one man. The film stars Mithun Chakraborty, Rahul Khanna, Arjun Rampal, Ameesha Patel, John Abraham, and Lara Dutta.

== Plot ==
Baba Sikander is a notorious criminal originally from India but now hiding in an unknown foreign country. Along with his brothers Aftab and Salim, he remotely runs a huge crime network in India. Baba Sikander's gang contacts rich businessman Kantilal Shah and tries extort a huge amount of ransom from him, threatening to kill him if he refuses. Kantilal's daughter Anjali suggests that he pay the ransom to save his life, while his stepson Karan insists that he should not give in. Kantilal adopts Karan's suggestion and rejects Baba Sikander. A few days later, Sikander's gang kills Kantilal. Devastated Anjali blames her father's death on Karan and disowns him. Karan then decides to avenge his stepfather's death by returning Baba Sikander to India, something that even the authorities could not achieve.

Karan approaches suspended police officer Arjun Srivastav, who had similar experience, for help. Arjun was a brave police officer. One day his pregnant wife was attacked by criminals and later died in hospital after giving birth to a daughter. Arjun retaliated by killing the gangsters, leading to his suspension. He now lives with his daughter and avoids conflict to not jeopardise her. Arjun agrees to help Karan after initially refusing. Arjun also suggests to involve Abhimanyu Singh in the operation. Abhimanyu was Baba Sikander's henchman and was later betrayed by the latter, effecting his imprisonment. Arjun believes Abhimanyu would be helpful as he has information about Baba Sikander and hates him. Arjun and Karan rescue Abhimanyu from jail and include him in the team.

Abhimanyu reveals that Baba Sikander is hiding in Venice, so the team heads there. Karan's plan and operation have been secretly observed by journalist Priya Desai, who is trying to write a good article about Kantilal's death. Priya follows them to Venice. In Venice, Abhimanyu suggests using Baba Sikander's girlfriend Sonia Singh to encounter him, and he requests money for this operation, which Karan provides. Priya then arrives and reveals that even though she just wanted to document it, she now feels she should join the operation, and according to her own investigation, Sonia is not Baba Sikander's girlfriend, but Abhimanyu's. Abhimanyu is trying to escape with Sonia and the money.

As Priya said, Abhimanyu tries to escape with Sonia, but they are soon caught by Baba Sikander's men. When they are about to kill Abhimanyu and Sonia, Karan's team saves them. After Karan saved his life, Abhimanyu regrets his earlier attempt to betray him and now genuinely offers assistance, which Karan accepts. Priya falls in love with Karan.

The team kills Salim, enraging Baba Sikander. They later ambush Baba Sikander's guesthouse, where he is supposed to be having a meeting with his business partners. But it is a trap. A gunfight ensues with Karan's team trapped in the house. Arjun sacrifices his life to allow the others to escape. After Arjun's death, Karan tries to disown the rest of the team and continue the quest alone to avoid endangering them, but they all insist on avenging Arjun's death.

They discover Baba Sikander's location - a German town near the French border. Based on their previous knowledge of Sikander's network, they assume he will go to a nearby hotel for a meeting. As Germany has no extradition treaty with India, but France does, they plan to divert Sikander's car, to make him drive through French territory, where Interpol would await him. But Sikander realises the plan and does not enter France. Karan's team then ambushes Sikander's convoy, killing his bodyguards. They drag him across the French border and Interpol arrests him.

Baba Sikander is later extradited to India. Karan is hailed as a national hero. Anjali reconciles with him. He marries Priya and they adopt Arjun's daughter.

== Cast ==
- Mithun Chakraborty as Baba Sikander
- Rahul Khanna as Karan Singh
- John Abraham as Abhimanyu Singh
- Arjun Rampal as Arjun Srivastav
- Ameesha Patel as Priya Desai
- Lara Dutta as Sonia Singh
- Milind Gunaji as Aftab
- Chunky Pandey as Sadela Salim
- Asrani as Kishorilal
- Avtar Gill as Farid Chacha
- Prithvi Zutshi as Kantilal Shah's employee
- Ritu Shivpuri as Anjali Shah
- Madan Joshi as Kantilal Shah
- Swini Khara as Ayesha Srivastav: Arjun's daughter

== Soundtrack ==
Elaan

Soundtrack album by Anu Malik
- Released: 11 December 2004
- Genre: Feature film soundtrack
- Label: Venus Records & Tapes

All lyrics are written by Sameer; all music is composed by Anu Malik.

Songs
No.	Title	Playback	Length
1.	"Anderlu Menderlu"	Anu Malik, Sonu Nigam, Sunidhi Chauhan, Shreya Ghoshal
2.	"Anderlu Manderlu" (Remix)	Anu Malik, Sonu Nigam, Sunidhi Chauhan, Shreya Ghoshal
3.	"Bechain Mera Dil"	Alka Yagnik, Udit Narayan
4.	"Dil Mein Hulchul"	Sunidhi Chauhan, K.K., Kunal Ganjawala
5.	"Dua Karna"	Sunidhi Chauhan
6.	"Meri Zindagi Mein"	Gayatri Ganjawala

== Critical response ==
Namrata Joshi of Outlook India gave the film 1 out of 5 stars, writing: "So terribly infantile and hackneyed that it seems to have been deliberately manufactured for a kindergarten audience." Jaspreet Pandohar of BBC.com gave the film 2 out of 5 stars, writing: "Sadly, the ending is as obvious as the love story sub-plots, and you never really fear the wrath of Sikander, played by 80s Bollywood disco king Chakraborty (India's answer to John Travolta post his Saturday Night Fever heyday). Even Bhatt's execution of Matrix-style action scenes and overuse of hapless goons is predictable. What could have been a stylish vendetta flick turns out to be 'time pass' - Indian slang for average." Merril Diniz of Rediff.com wrote: "If you're a die-hard John Abraham fan, then go ahead and watch the film because he looks like a million bucks and delivers a good performance. But there's not much else to hold your interest for three whole hours."
