= Rahul Khanna =

Indian actor

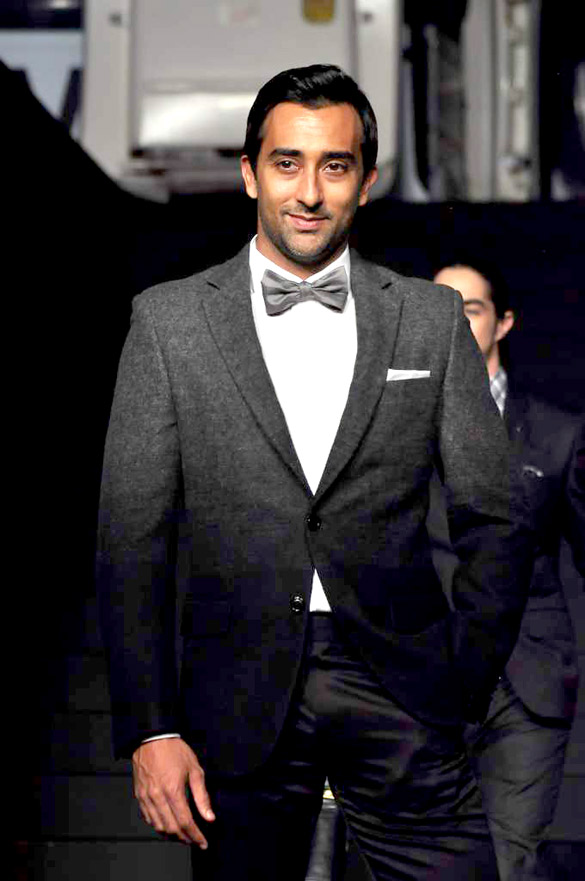
- Khanna at the launch event of Van Heusen
- Born: 20 June 1972 (age 54); Mumbai, Maharashtra, India
- Education: Lee Strasberg Theatre and Film Institute; School of Visual Arts
- Occupations: Actor; VJ; writer
- Years active: 1994–2023
- Father: Vinod Khanna
- Relatives: Akshaye Khanna (brother); A. F. S. Talyarkhan (maternal grandfather)

Rahul Khanna (born 20 June 1972) is an Indian actor, VJ, model and writer who works in Bollywood. He is the eldest son of actor Vinod Khanna and the elder brother of Akshaye Khanna.

== Early life and background ==
Khanna was born and raised in Mumbai. His father was a Bollywood star & a politician, Vinod Khanna, his mother was ex-model Gitanjali Taleyar Khanna. Bobby A. F. S. Talyarkhan was his maternal grandfather's cousin, and his younger brother is Bollywood actor, Akshaye Khanna.

Khanna studied at the Lee Strasberg Theatre Institute and the School of Visual Arts in New York City.

== Career ==
=== Film ===
He made his feature film debut in Deepa Mehta's 1947 Earth (1999), alongside Aamir Khan. His performance earned him several awards including the Filmfare Best Male Debut Award. He has since appeared in Mehta's Bollywood/Hollywood (2003) and Wake up Sid starring Ranbir Kapoor and Konkana Sen Sharma. He also appeared in Love Aaj Kal.

Khanna's other mainstream Bollywood films include Elaan and Raqeeb and his international credits include The Emperor's Club with Kevin Kline.

=== Television ===
MTV Asia, VJ, 1994–1998

Asian Variety Show, Host, AVS TV Network, North America, 1999–2001

Discovery Week, Host, Discovery Channel, 2006

Khanna has also hosted numerous events like the IIFA Awards, the Miss India pageant, the Screen Awards, the Stardust (magazine) Awards, the Miss India Worldwide pageant, Naomi Campbell's Fashion for Relief show at Mumbai Fashion Week, the GQ (India) Men of the Year Awards 2009 & 2010, Teacher's Achievement Awards 2008 & 2010, The International Film Festival of India 2011, The Hello (magazine) Hall of Fame Awards 2011 and The Ernst & Young Entrepreneur of the Year Awards 2012.

=== Commercials and endorsements ===
Khanna has been associated with several brands including Toyota, Lay's Chips, Pepsi, DTC (Diamond Trading Company/ De Beers group), Trent (Westside), Tommy Hilfiger, Jaypee Group's Jaypee Greens, Johnnie Walker Blue Label, Kiehl's, Maggi and Audi.

Khanna has appeared in a PETA India campaign to protect elephants and birds.

=== Writing ===
Khanna has a signature humorous writing style. Apart from his own blog, his pieces and essays have been published in several leading newspapers, magazines and websites including Harper's Bazaar India, Vogue India, Cosmopolitan (magazine) India, Elle (India), GQ India, Marie Claire India, The Times of India, Deccan Herald and The Huffington Post India.

== Filmography ==
=== Film ===
Year	Title	Role	Notes
1999	Earth	Hassan	Filmfare Award for Best Male Debut
2001	3 AM	Morris	
2002	Bollywood/Hollywood	Rahul Seth	
2002	The Emperor's Club	Deepak Mehta	
2005	Elaan	Karan Shah	
2007	Raqeeb	Remo Matthews	
2008	Tahaan	Kuka Saheb	
2008	Dil Kabaddi	Rajveer Singh	
2009	Love Aaj Kal	Vikram Joshi	
2009	Wake Up Sid	Kabir Chaudhary	Chief Editor of Mumbai Beats' Magazine
2014	Fireflies	Shiv	
2023	Lost	Ranjan Verma	

=== Television ===
Year	Title	Role	Director	Notes
2013	24	Tarun Khosla	Abhinay Deo	Season 01 Episode 10 & 11
2014	The Americans	Yousaf Rana	Stefan Schwartz	Episode: "Yousaf"
2015	The Americans	Yousaf Rana	Daniel Sackheim	Episode: "EST Men"
2015	The Americans	Yousaf Rana	Daniel Sackheim	Episode: "Baggage (The Americans)"
2015	The Americans	Yousaf Rana	Kevin Dowling	Episode: "Salang Pass"
2015	The Americans	Yousaf Rana	Andrew Bernstein (director)	Episode: "One Day in the Life of Anton Baklanov"
2015	The Americans	Yousaf Rana	Daniel Sackheim	Episode: "March 8, 1983"
2019	Leila		Deepa Mehta	
