= Peter Mark Kendall =

American actor (born 1986)

- Born: May 11, 1986 (age 40); Baltimore, Maryland, U.S.
- Occupation: Actor
- Years active: 2008–present
- Spouse: Helen Cespedes (m. 2016)

Peter Mark Kendall (born May 11, 1986) is an American actor and musician with a career in stage, film, and television. He is known for playing the role of Hans in FX's The Americans and Richard Onsted in the CBS series Strange Angel.

== Early life ==
Kendall was born in Baltimore, Maryland to a family that emigrated from South Africa.

He received a BA in theatre from McDaniel College, where he also studied jazz guitar. He completed his MFA in Acting from Brown University in 2013.

== Career ==
Kendall's acting career began after he obtained a role in the television series The Leftovers, and he played the role of Tom Henney. Thereafter, he played roles in Chicago Med, The Americans, and Girls.

He made his first appearance in film playing Connor in Time Out of Mind. Kendall starred on Broadway in Six Degrees of Separation, The Harvest, Blue Ridge, Mercury Fur, and The Rose Tattoo. He has also composed music for film, podcasts, and ads with Hickory Collective.

He is married to actress Helen Cespedes.

== Filmography ==
=== Film ===
Year	Title	Role	Notes
2014	Time Out of Mind	Connor	
2014	Seven Lovers	Ian	
2015	Louder Than Bombs	Student (College Party)	
2016	The Ticket	Arnold Dixon	
2019	The Rest of Us	Chris	
2019	Entangled	Mark	
2020	Boys on Film 20: Heaven Can Wait		
2020	The Scottish Play	Adam	
2022	Top Gun: Maverick	Meek Engineer	

=== Television ===
Year	Title	Role	Notes
2014	The Leftovers	Tom Henney	Episode: "B.J. and the A.C."
2015	Girls	Jeffrey	3 episodes (season 4)
2015–2017	The Americans	Hans	Recurring role (seasons 3–5)
2015	Law & Order: SVU	Steven Kaplan	Episode: "Intimidation Game"
2015	Eye Candy	Bubonic / Charlie	2 episodes
2015	Public Morals	Fester	Episode: "A Fine Line"
2016–2018	Chicago Med	Joey Thomas	Recurring role (seasons 1–2), Guest (seasons 3–4)
2016	Gotham	Puck Davies	Episode: "Wrath of the Villains: Prisoners"
2016	Untitled CW/CBS Mars Project	Mason Rose	Unsold pilot
2017	The Good Fight	Ted Acker-Byrne	Episode: "Henceforth Known as Property"
2017	Blue Bloods	Kyle Wentworth	Episode: "Pick Your Poison"
2018–2019	Strange Angel	Richard Onsted	Main cast
2020	Awkwafina Is Nora From Queens	Rat Lung	Episode: "Vagarina"
2023	Kaleidoscope	Stan Loomis	Main cast
2025–2026	Watson	Dr. Stephens Croft/Dr. Adam Croft	Main cast

Key
†	Denotes TV productions that have not yet been released

== Theatre ==
Year	Title	Role	Venue	Notes
2008	The Matchmaker	August	Center Stage	
2009	'Tis Pity She's a Whore	Poggio	Center Stage	
2015	Mercury Fur	Party Guest	The New Group	Off-Broadway
2016	The Harvest	Josh	Lincoln Center Theater	World premiere; Off-Broadway
2017	Six Degrees of Separation	Rick	Ethel Barrymore Theatre	Broadway
2018-2019	Blue Ridge	Cole	Atlantic Theater Company	World premiere; Off-Broadway
2022	Dodi & Diana	Jason	HERE Arts Center	World premiere
2023	A Bright New Boise	Will	Signature Theatre Company	Off-Broadway
2024	The Lonely Few	Adam	MCC Theater	Off-Broadway
