= Svetlana Efremova =

Soviet-born American actress (born 1970)

- Светлана Анатольевна Ефремова
- Born: Svetlana Anatolyevna Efremova; 1970 (age 55–56); Novosibirsk, Russian Soviet Federative Socialist Republic, Soviet Union
- Other name: Svetlana Efremova-Reed
- Education: Russian State Institute of Performing Arts (BFA), Yale University (MFA)
- Occupations: film and stage actress, educator
- Spouse: Patrick Reed

Svetlana Efremova (born 1970; also known as Svetlana Efremova–Reed) is a Soviet Union-born American stage, film, and television actress as well as an educator. She starred in the American film White Oleander (2002). Efremova teaches acting at California State University, Fullerton (CSUF), where she serves as the head of acting program.

== Biography ==
Efremova was born in 1970, in Novosibirsk, Russia, Soviet Union. She graduated from Russian State Institute of Performing Arts (former name Saint Petersburg Theatre Arts Academy). She was a member of the St. Petersburg State Theatre for eleven years. Efremova moved to the United States for school, and received a master’s degree in 1997 in acting from the David Geffen School of Drama at Yale University.

She appeared on Broadway in a touring production of Uncle Vanya, as Helena; and the touring production of Vanya and Sonia and Masha and Spike, as Cassandra. Efremova has appeared in television series in the genres of drama, crime, and detective. Her film acting career took off in 2002, when she starred in the film, White Oleander directed by Peter Kosminsky. She portrayed Boris Yeltsin's daughter Tatyana Dyachenko who managed American political consultants in the American film Spinning Boris (2003).

Efremova is married to Patrick Reed, and has children.

== Filmography ==
=== Film ===
Year	Title	Role	Notes
1988	Fontan	Masha	
2000	Prince of Central Park	Sophia's Mom	
2001	Spiral	Clara	Short film
2002	White Oleander	Rena Gruschenka	
2002	Phone Booth	Erica	
2003	Hotel Lobby	Diana	
2003	Spinning Boris	Tatyana Dyachenko	
2004	Vremya zhatvy	Pevitsa	
2005	The Island	Midwife	
2006	A Cigar at the Beach	Woman in White	Short film
2006	Stick It	Dorrie	
2006	The Elder Son	Vera	
2009	Figa.ro	Terroristka	
2012	Killer by Nature	Dr. Ramos	
2020	Brighton Beach	Vera	
2022	Model		

=== Television ===
Year	Title	Role	Notes
1997; 2003	The Practice	Rena / Mrs. Vjorka	2 episodes
2001	Gideon's Crossing	Sheila the Temp	Episode: "The Others"
2002	The Guardian	Maria Braczyk	Episode: "Solidarity"
2002	The West Wing	Ludmila Koss, Novaya Gazeta	Episode: "Enemies Foreign and Domestic"
2002	Thieves	Svetlana	Episode: "The Green and the Black"
2003	Strong Medicine	Corrina	3 episodes
2003	Without a Trace	Yelena Tzetcovich	Episode: "Prodigy"
2003	Cold Case	Landlord	Episode: "Fly Away"
2004	Curb Your Enthusiasm	Nina	Episode: "The Weatherman"
2004	Joan of Arcadia	Joan's Doctor	Episode: "Silence"
2004	ER	Impatient Woman	Episode: "Time of Death"
2004–2005	Judging Amy	Nadia Patzaikin	2 episodes
2007	The Young and the Restless	Tour Guide	1 episode
2006–2007	Monk	Nurse Ullman	2 episodes
2008	Dirt	Anna Karpova	Episode: "Ties That (Don't) Bind"
2010	The Closer	Floria Stenzel	Episode: "Old Money"
2011	The Whole Truth	Ramsted's Girlfriend	Episode: "The State Calls Kathryn Peale"
2011; 2013	Body of Proof	Mrs. Svetlova / Husky Accented Voice	2 episodes
2013	Motive	Dr. Monika Harper	Episode: "Out of the Past"
2013	Work It	Psychic	Episode: "Immaculate Deception"
2014	Shameless	Sasha	Episode: "Strangers On a Train"
2015	The Americans	Zinaida Preobrazhenskaya	Recurring role (season 3); 6 episodes
2016	Rizzoli & Isles	Katrin Ulmanis	Episode: "East Meets West"
2016	The OA	Zoya	Episode: "New Colossus"
2017–2018	NCIS: Los Angeles	Vladlena Sokolov	2 episodes
2017	MacGyver	Olivia Prior	Episode: "Ruler"
2017	The Blacklist: Redemption	Grushenka	Episode: "Independence, U.S.A."
2017	House of Cards	Nadia Surkova	Episode: "Chapter 61"
2017	The Brave	Bathhouse Employee	Episode: "Moscow Rules"
2017	SEAL Team	Katya	Episode: "Rolling Dark"
2020	Spinning Out	Dasha Fedorova	Main role; 10 episodes
2021	Station 19	Lenya Hughes	2 episodes
2023–present	For All Mankind	Irina Morozova	Main role (season 4); recurring role (season 5); 13 episodes
