= Mary K. Trigg =

Mary K. Trigg (born 1955) is an American educator, author, and academic. She serves as an associate professor in the department of women's and gender studies at Rutgers University.

== Biography ==
Trained in women’s history and American studies, her scholarship focuses on the history of feminism in the United States; motherhood studies and women, work, and family; and women’s/feminist leadership. Trigg is also Director of Leadership Programs and Research at the Institute for Women's Leadership, and the founding director of the Leadership Scholars Certificate Program which she has led since 1998. In her time at Rutgers she has also served as associate director of the Center for Women and Work.

Trigg’s current book project, Of Mothers and Time: Maternalism, Temporality, and Representations of Mothers in the United States, 1920-1960, investigates the experiences and representations of rural mothers, immigrant mothers, and African-American mothers in the U.S. In this book Trigg turns to visual and material culture (photographs, novels, popular literature) to examine motherhood in relation to varying practices concerning keeping, marking, transcending, and memorializing time.

=== Research ===
Trigg's research interests include family and work, the history of American feminism, women's education and leadership development, and women's community organizations.

=== Writing ===
Trigg is the author of Feminism as Life’s Work: Four Modern American Women through Two World Wars (Rutgers University Press, 2014), Leading the Way: Young Women’s Activism for Social Change (Rutgers University Press, 2010, edited anthology), and the forthcoming Junctures in Women's Leadership: Social Movements (Rutgers University Press, edited with Alison R. Bernstein).

Trigg has published articles in Journal of Women's History, Liberal Education, Initiatives, Transformations, American National Biography, and Community, Work & Family, amongst others.

== Awards ==
- IRW Fellowship, Definitions of Community, Rutgers University, 2007–2008
- Nominee, Outstanding Woman Educator, Rutgers Women on the Rise, 2007
- NHPRC Fellow in Historical Documentary Editing, 1995–1996
- The Alfred P. Sloan Foundation, for “Re-imagining Work and Community: Perspectives from Professional Women in Dual-Earner Families.”
- Woodrow Wilson Dissertation Grant in Women's Studies, 1984
- Brown University Fellowship, 1981–1985
- Carnegie Corporation Grant, Carnegie-Mellon University, 1979–1980
- Woodrow Wilson Women’s Studies Dissertation Fellowship, 1983–1984

== Education ==
- Ph.D. American Civilization, Brown University

- M.A. American Civilization, Brown University

- M.A.English, Carnegie-Mellon University

- B.S., cum laude University of Michigan, Natural Resources
