= Center for Women's Global Leadership =

Organization for women's rights

The Center for Women's Global Leadership, based at Rutgers University, was founded in 1989 by Charlotte Bunch, the former executive director and an internationally renowned activist for women's human rights. Executive Director Krishanti Dharmaraj is also the founder of the Dignity Index and co-founder of WILD for Human Rights and the Sri Lanka Children's Fund. The former executive director, Radhika Balakrishnan, is now the faculty director, and a professor in the Department of Women's and Gender Studies at Rutgers, chair of the Board of the US Human Rights Network, and a board member of the Center for Constitutional Rights. Located on Douglass Residential College (formerly Douglass College) at Rutgers University, CWGL is a unit of International Programs within the School of Arts and Sciences and is a member of the Institute for Women's Leadership, a consortium of women's programs at Rutgers.

== About the center ==
The CWGL is both an academic center at a major public research university as well as a non-governmental organization with ECOSOC Special Consultative Status at the United Nations working on policy and advocacy. CWGL works to develop and facilitate women's leadership worldwide not only for women's human rights, but also for international social justice.

- Violence against women
- Sexual and reproductive health
- Socio-economic well-being

Integrating gender and women's human rights into the work of local, national, regional and international institutions, CWGL's programs inform and mobilize advocates for women's human rights around specific events and build linkages among them to enhance their capacity to influence policy making. Much of the center's programmatic work stems from footholds made at the 1993 Vienna World Conference on Human Rights and the 1995 Beijing Fourth World Conference on Women.

Working in collaboration with women leaders and NGOs around the world—whether at UN meetings such as the Commission on the Status of Women, international mobilization campaigns, such as the 16 Days of Activism against Gender-based Violence, or through global education endeavors—CWGL has helped secure international policy commitments that clearly state "women's rights are human rights".

With these policy benchmarks in place, the center has turned its energy toward implementation of this concept and holding policy making bodies accountable to their promises to the world's women. Core activities in this program area include UN Monitoring and Advocacy and the coordination of international mobilization campaigns.

With its new executive director in place, the center is continuing with programmatic work on ending violence against women, protecting women human rights defenders, and encouraging UN reform with a new body to monitor the realization of women's human rights. Moreover, the center is expanding into considerations of the application of macroeconomic policies and the relationship between women and development within a human rights framework.

== At Rutgers University ==
In addition to bridging the worlds of academia and activism, CWGL spans two different areas of academia at Rutgers University, and the center is a unit of International Programs within the School of Arts and Sciences. The CWGL has a special position within this department because the other programs of the Office of International Programs are either focused on the United Nations or broken up into regional studies with regional scopes. Thus, the CWGL plays a unique role by fostering women's leadership globally and having an international scope. The CWGL is also a member of the Institute for Women's Leadership (IWL), a consortium of eight women's programs at Rutgers University created to study and promote how and why women lead, and to develop programs that prepare women of all ages to lead effectively.

=== Poster collection ===
The Margery Somers Foster Center, Rutgers University Libraries, in collaboration with the Department of Women's and Gender Studies and the Center for Women's Global Leadership (CWGL), both of the School of Arts and Sciences, have developed the Poster Collection portal, which provides digitized access to approximately 300 posters published by women's rights organizations worldwide and housed at CWGL. The posters chronicle 20 years of transnational women's activism and advocacy, while documenting evolving issues of the global women's movement. The digital repository is housed in RUcore, the Rutgers Community Institutional Repository, an online archive, where they are accessible to all. The American Library Association recognized the CWGL poster collection in 2012, and were awarded the 2012 Association of college and Research Libraries (ACRL) Women and Gender Studies Section (WGSS) Award for Significant Achievement in Woman's Studies Librarianship. The collection is also featured on Discovering American Women's History Online.

== At the United Nations ==
At the United Nations, CWGL plays a major role at various meetings addressing the implementation of commitments from world conferences including the Vienna Conference (1993), Cairo Hearing on Reproductive Health and Human Rights, Copenhagen Hearing on Economic Justice and Women's Human Rights, and the Beijing Conference, particularly at the UN Commission on the Status of Women, the UN Human Rights Council, and at the reviews of these UN World Conferences.

There are several critical meetings at the United Nations that serve as important opportunities for women's human rights advocates to assess successes and failures in implementing commitments to women. As an ECOSOC accredited NGO, the CWGL participates directly in roundtables organized by the NGO Committee on the Status of Women in preparation for each session of the Commission on the Status of Women. In this capacity, the CWGL plays a multifaceted role by:

- Facilitating planning sessions in which women's human rights defenders and advocates can both monitor and contribute to meetings effectively
- Convening a women's human rights caucus and other gatherings
- Organizing monitoring and other advocacy training
- Sending out alerts and reports both before and after such meetings

In March 2007, the Women's Environment & Development Organization (WEDO), together with the Center for Women's Global Leadership, convened a meeting of 50 women activists from around the world to develop a comprehensive and multi-faceted strategy for global, regional and national action to gain the UN General Assembly's approval of a stronger, single, fully resourced women's entity at the UN. As a result of that meeting and the continued need for women's collaborative advocacy on this issue, WEDO and the CWGL, along with hundreds of activists spanning all regions, launched the Gender Equality Architecture Reform (GEAR) campaign in February 2008, to mobilize women's groups and allies to push for the adoption of the new UN entity for gender equality and women's empowerment. On June 30, 2010, the United Nations General Assembly resolution was agreed to and subsequently formally adopted by the General Assembly on Friday, July 2, to establish "UN Women", the new gender equality entity at the UN.

== International mobilization campaigns ==
=== 16 Days of Activism Against Gender Violence ===
The 16 Days of Activism against Gender Violence Campaign was launched by CWGL in 1991 as an annual campaign that demands the elimination of all forms of violence against women. This rallying cry erupts annually between November 25 and December 10, and more than 3,700 organizations participate in the event from approximately 164 countries.

The dates of the campaign align with significant dates, including:

- November 25 – International Day for the Elimination of Violence against Women
- November 29 – International Women Human Rights Defenders Day
- December 1 – World AIDS Day
- December 5 – International Volunteer Day for Economic and Social Development
- December 6–Marks the anniversary of the Montreal Massacre, observed in Canada as the National Day of Remembrance and Action on Violence Against Women
- December 10 – International Human Rights Day and the anniversary of the Universal Declaration of Human Rights

=== Global Campaigns for Women's Human Rights ===
The Center for Women's Global Leadership interacts with a community of women's human rights defenders in order to place pressure on local, national, and international decision-making bodies. Global campaigns usually emphasize that "women's rights are human rights", and are supported by thousands of individuals and organizations from around the world. These constituencies rally to take action to protect individual rights defenders and advocates in countries from Serbia to Iran.

Activities include a series of Global Tribunals, petitions, and "Take Action" kits. Additionally, the center also holds public forums to conduct assessments of the women's human rights movement. One such event was the "International Strategic Directions Consultation" that took place in November 2003 as part of the Vienna + 10 Updates.

==== Women Human Rights Defenders International Coalition ====
The Women Human Rights Defenders International Coalition is a resource and advocacy network for the protection and support of women human rights defenders worldwide. When their gender or the nature of their work has made them the subject of attacks, gender-sensitive mechanisms are required for their protection and support. The Coalition involves women activists as well as men who defend women's rights and lesbian, gay, bi-sexual, and transgender (LGBT) defenders and groups committed to the advancement of women's human rights and sexual rights.

The Coalition is currently composed of 28 members: Amnesty International (AI); Asia Pacific Forum on Women, Law and Development (APWLD); Asian Forum for Human Rights and Development (Forum Asia); Association for Progressive Communications Women's Networking Support Programme; Association for Women's Rights in Development (AWID); Baobab for Women's Human Rights; The Center for Reproductive Rights (CRR); Center for Women's Global Leadership (CWGL); Coalition of African Lesbians (CAL); Front Line International Foundation for the Protection of Human Rights Defenders (Front Line); Human Rights First; Information Monitor (Inform); International Federation for Human Rights (FIDH); International Service for Human Rights (ISHR); International Women's Rights Action Watch Asia Pacific (IWRAW-AP); Isis International; ISIS-Women's International Cross-Cultural Exchange (ISIS-WICCE); Just Associate (JASS); The Latin American and Caribbean Committee for the Defense of Women's Rights (CLADEM); MADRE; Nazra for Feminist Studies; Peace Brigades International; Rainbow Rights Project (R-Rights); Urgent Action Fund for Women's Human Rights (UAF); Women's Global Network for Reproductive Rights; Women's Initiatives for Gender Justice (WIGJ); Women's Rehabilitation Centre; Women Living Under Muslim Laws (WLUML); World Organisation Against Torture (OMCT).
