= 16 Days of Activism against Gender-based Violence =

Annual campaign

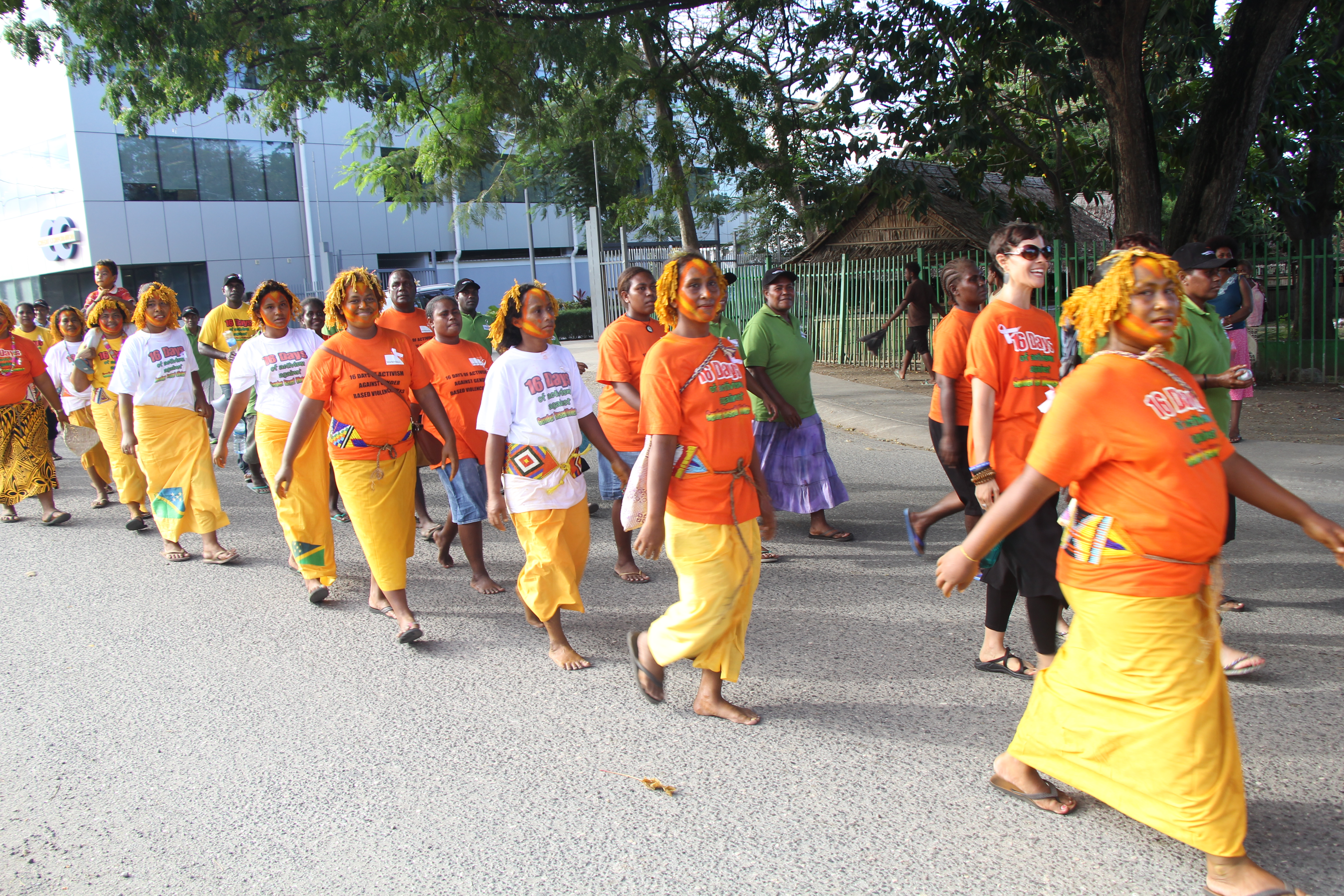
Women from Lord House Settlement community March in the opening parade for 16 Days of Activism Against Gender Based Violence. Photo: UN Women/Marni Gilbert

16 Days of Activism Against Gender-Based Violence (abbreviated 16D) is an international campaign that seeks to spread awareness about the global humanitarian crisis of violence against women and girls (VAWG). The campaign runs every year from 25 November, the International Day for the Elimination of Violence against Women, to 10 December, Human Rights Day.

The campaign was formally established in 1991 by activists attending the first Women's Global Leadership Institute (WGLI), held by the Center for Women's Global Leadership (CWGL), at Rutgers University in New Jersey. Since its inception in 1991, more than 6,000 organizations from nearly 190 countries have directly contributed to the 16D cause.

== Origins of the movement ==
=== Historical context ===
The 1993 Declaration on the Elimination of Violence against Women adopted by the United Nations (UN) General Assembly defines violence against women (VAW) as "any act of gender-based violence (GBV) that results in, or is likely to result in, physical, sexual or psychological harm or suffering to women." GBV in this case being "any harmful act that is based on socially ascribed (gender) differences between males and females." A significant example of this is femicide, which the European Institute for Gender Equality broadly defines as "the killing of a woman or girl solely because of her gender."

GBV and femicide are global humanitarian crises that need to be addressed from an international lens. According to a report by the UN Office on Drugs and Crime, femicide is "the most brutal and extreme manifestation of a continuum of violence against women and girls that involves intentional killing with a gender-related motivation." In Latin America, GBV has "come to be described as a 'pandemic' with between a quarter and a half of women suffer[ing] from domestic violence." Globally, VAW in their own homes is "the leading cause of injuries suffered between the ages of fifteen and forty-four" and "at least 45,000 women were murdered by their intimate partners or family members worldwide in 2021."

Many organizations across the globe recognize VAW as "an impediment to women's social and economic development." Pairing this fact with the World Health Organization's finding that nearly one third of women globally will experience GBV, it can be seen that VAWG is a major public health and human rights issue.

==== The Mirabal Sisters and Global Martyrdom ====
No country has been spared by the humanitarian crisis of VAWG. The UN Global Database on VAW "estimates that nearly 840 million women – almost 1 in 3 – have been subjected to physical and/or sexual intimate partner violence, non-partner sexual violence or both at least once in their lifetime," and this is exacerbated in countries "classified as lowest-income, conflict-affected and climate-vulnerable settings."

In 1930, Rafael Trujillo "assumed near-absolute control" of the Dominican Republic (DR) "through intimidation" and "a rigged presidential election," effectively "ushering in the 'Era of Trujillo'" – a 30-year long, deadly dictatorship. Besides being a cruel leader, Trujillo was also a "sexual deviant with his own unit of beauty scouts" that would travel around the DR in search of "young attractive girls" that he would kidnap and subsequently rape.

Patria, Minerva and Maria Teresa Mirabal were three sisters living in the DR during Trujillo's regime, and upon learning of the sisters Trujillo quickly became enamoured with Minerva. It was believed that Trujillo made a sexual advance that Minerva outspokenly shot down, and this rejection would result in a vicious campaign against the Mirabal family that lasted years. From imprisoning Minerva's father to blacklisting the family from business opportunities and placing both her and her mother on house arrest, Trujillo attempted multiple times to coerce Minerva into entering a sexual relationship with him to which she repeatedly refused.

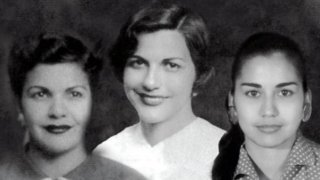
The Mirabal Sisters from left, Patria, Minerva and Maria Teresa.

Following the failed attempt to overthrow Trujillo in 1959 by exiled Cuban revolutionaries combined with the stress of being under their leaders' vengeful eye, the Mirabal sisters quickly became incentivized to join the resistance against Trujillo. Established the following year in 1960, their revolutionary movement would become known as "The 14 June Movement." From handing out pamphlets containing the names of Trujillo's murdered victims to obtaining materials for artillery-making, the sisters came to be known as Las Mariposas (the butterflies), and while they were individually affected by Trujillo, their "main reason for opposing him was a unified desire for the DR to become a peaceful democracy."

The sisters' movement came to its end following the failure of a planned assassination. A day before the assassination was planned to take place, the revolutionaries were exposed and imprisoned; although international pressure eventually forced Trujillo to release the prisoners. Following their release, Trujillo's economic prosperity significantly declined, and despite the lack of proof, the dictator blamed the Mirabal sisters for his failures and declared a kill order on the women.

On 25 November 1960 while returning from visiting their husbands in prison, the sisters' car was stopped by Trujillo's henchmen. After first killing the driver, the men proceeded to kidnap the three sisters at gunpoint before strangling and beating them to death with clubs. In an attempt to make their deaths appear an accident, the henchmen placed the sisters' bodies back in their car and pushed it off a nearby cliff.

After their deaths, the Mirabal sisters captured the hearts of advocates worldwide. Instantly, the women "became martyrs to the revolutionary cause, helping solidify resistance to Trujillo both at home and abroad." Despite some who claimed the Mirabal sisters' status as middle-class deemed them unfit for the "stereotypical image of revolutionaries," the women left a legacy that "lauded them as 'Martyrs of the Dominican Resistance,' 'world symbols for women's struggles,' and 'global symbols of feminist resistance.'"

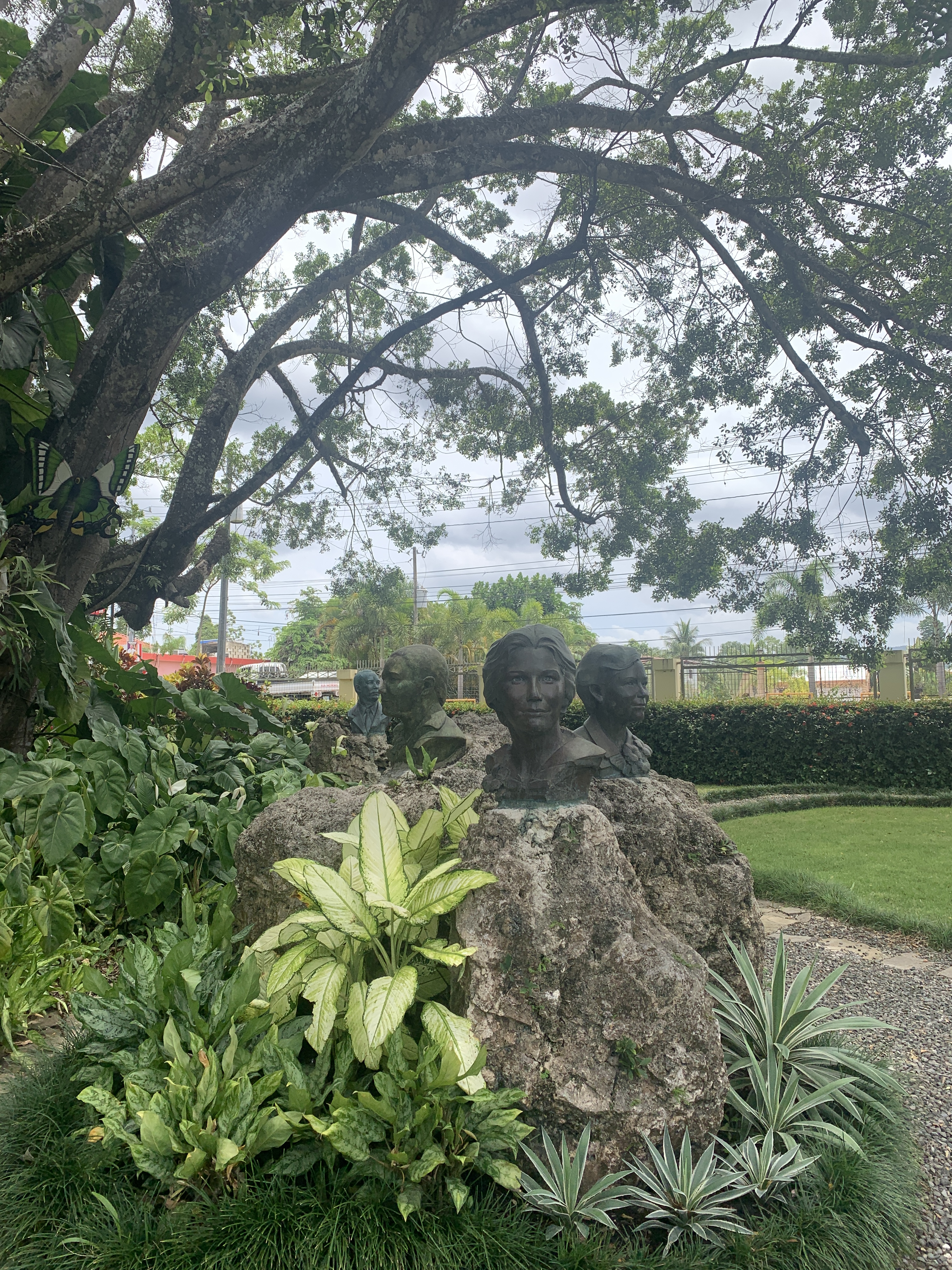
Statue busts of Mirabal sisters from left, Maria Teresa, Minerva and Patria in the garden of The Mirabal Sister's House Museum

==== Institutional recognition of "International Day for the Elimination of Violence Against Women" ====
Following the murders, grassroots organizations across the globe took it upon themselves to remember the contributions of the Mirabal sisters, and In 1981, the first Feminist Encuentro for Latin America and the Caribbean established 25 November, the day of the sisters' murders, as "the Day for Non-Violence Against Women," and later in 1993, the UN General Assembly adopted "Resolution 48/104 for the Elimination of Violence Against Women" which defines this violence as "any act of gender-based violence that results in, or is likely to result in, physical, sexual, or psychological harm or suffering to women." in 1999 the General Assembly cemented this decision by establishing 25 November as the "'International Day for the Elimination of Violence Against Women' in honor of the Mirabal Sisters."

== Campaign conceptions ==
In 1989, feminist activist Charlotte Bunch established the CWGL at Rutgers, The State University of New Jersey in affiliation with the School of Arts & Sciences, as well as a part of the Office of International Programs. Additionally, the center is also a member of the Institute for Women's Leadership (IWL), "a consortium of seven women's programs at Rutgers University created to study and promote how and why women lead, and to develop programs that prepare women of all ages to lead effectively."

In 1991, two years after its inception, the CWGL hosted its first Women's Global Leadership Institute (WGLI). This was a conference that welcomed 23 women from various countries across the globe to discuss "different aspects of GBV and human rights, learning from one another's experiences and consequently developing strategies to increase international awareness of the systemic nature of VAW and to expose this violence as a violation of women's human rights." These women were "local civil society leaders" who were "interested in building the global women's human rights movement."

It was at this first WGLI conference, following the international outrage over Trujillo's murder of the Mirabal sisters, that the 16D Campaign was established. This international human rights campaign is a "dedicated effort to raise awareness, call for change and mobilize action" by "call[ing] upon individuals and organizations around the world to develop strategies for the prevention and elimination of VAWG." With a specific focus on grassroots organization, the 16D Campaign "provid[es] an international platform for advocacy and campaigning."

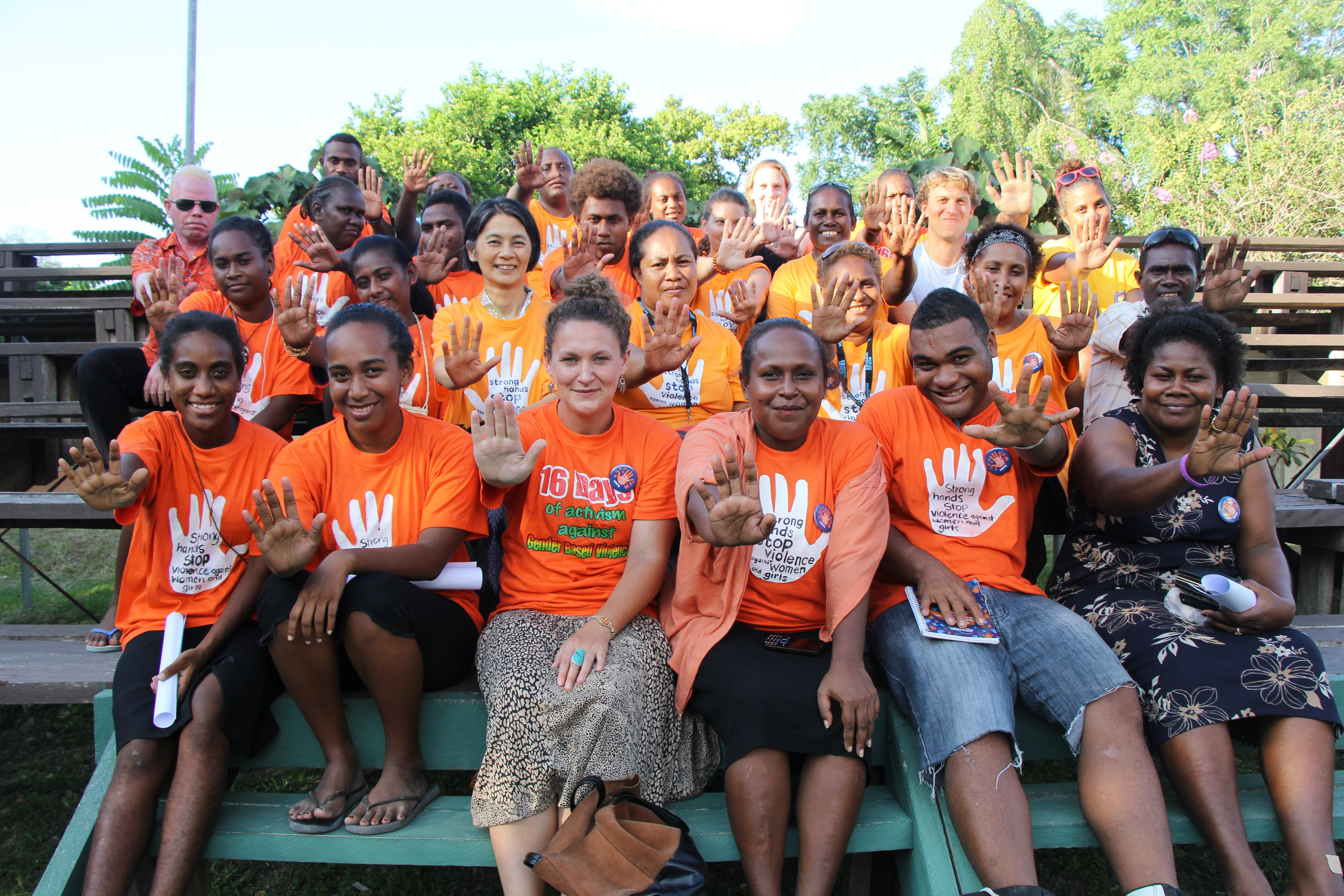
"UN Women Staff Gaylyn Puairana and Elsie Wickham speaking to members of the public in Honiara about gender based violence and the UNiTE campaign."

Beginning on 25 November (International Day Against Violence Against Women) and ending on 10 December (International Human Rights Day), a critical element during the campaign's infancy was "the launch of a worldwide petition drive aimed at the United Nations World Conference on Human Rights which was held in Vienna in 1993." This conference "strength[ened] human rights work around the world," and "took new steps to promote and protect the rights of women, children and indigenous peoples."

== Institutional support ==
=== Global participation ===
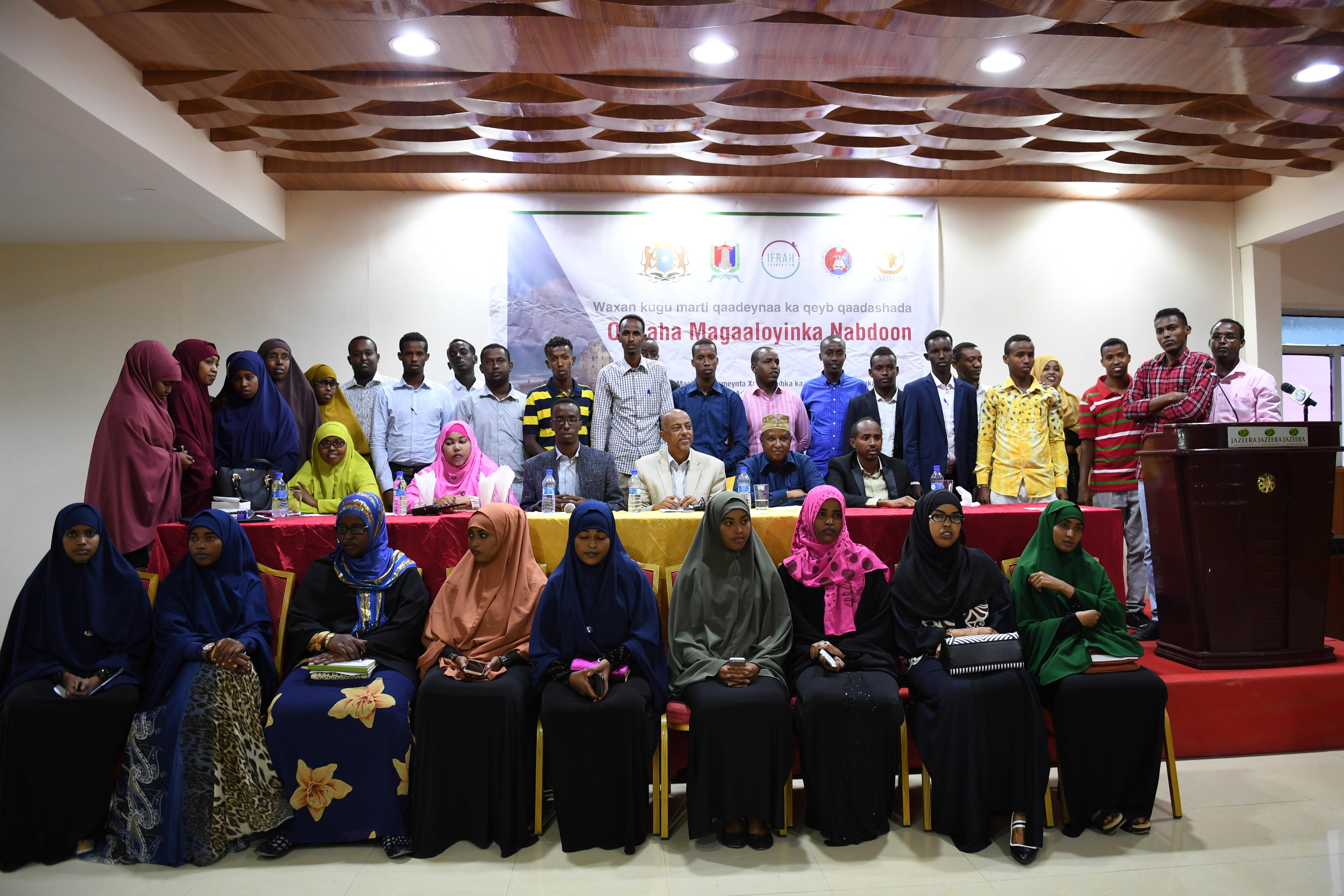
"Officials from Banadir Regional Administration pose a group of a photograph with participants during a workshop on 16 days of Activism Against Gender-Based Violence in Mogadishu, Somalia on 11 December 2016. AMISOM Photo / Ilyas Ahmed."

The CWGL's global petition urged the committee of the conference to "comprehensively address women's human rights at every level of its proceedings and to recognize GBV as a human rights issue." This petition and the intention behind it sent a message to the world that encouraged continued involvement in UN conferences, "especially the Fourth World Conference on Women in Beijing in 1995." GBV is a global human rights crisis, and the 16D campaign "push[es] the conversation beyond awareness to accountability, prevention and meaningful transformation." At its core, the campaign hopes to spark international conversation among systems in power in countries across the globe, but it also encourages grassroots and local collaboration surrounding VAWG.

In coordinating the 16D campaign, the CWGL "has been instrumental in fostering women's leadership in the area of human rights." By prioritizing "international mobilization campaigns, strategic planning activities" and "UN monitoring and advocacy," the CWGL "has been a central player in the transformative endeavor of demanding respect for the rights of all women."

=== United Nations involvement ===
Following the UN Human Rights Conference in Vienna in 1991, the UN General Assembly established the Office of the High Commissioner for Human Rights (OHCHR) in 1993 to "promote and protect all human rights... help empower people... assist governments" and "inject a human rights perspective into all UN programmes."

To solidify the intention behind the international conversations surrounding GBV and VAW, in 1999 the UN General Assembly established 25 November as the "International Day for the Elimination of Violence Against Women."

In 2006, the UN Secretary General "consulted with civil society representatives to help develop an in-depth study on VAW," and in 2008 with support from and management from UN Women, launched the "UNiTE by 2030 to End Violence Against Women," a "multi-year effort" campaign, "aimed at raising public awareness and increasing political will and resources for preventing and ending VAWG in all parts of the world." Established to support the 16D campaign, the organization "calls on governments, civil society, women's organizations, young people, the private sector, media and the UN system to join forces to address the global pandemic of VAWG." UNiTE's vision can only truly be accomplished through international collaboration between foreign governments, and this is done through highlighting and publicizing the campaign's goals each year.

Similarly, OHCHR is a critical agent in ensuring the success of the 16D campaign and annually works in tandem with "the media to promote the 16D and UNiTE campaigns," which over the nearly 40 years the campaign has been running has "made the case for sustained funding and support for women peacebuilders... as an essential prerequisite for addressing and eliminating gender-based violence."

=== Campaign identity and strategies ===
The 16D campaign has a strong mission identity, and has gained a significantly large presence online over the last decade, with recent years' topics focusing on digital violence – helping ensure that the discourse surrounding GBV continues to adapt alongside humanity, not in an attempt to catch up with it. The campaign uses orange as its primary branding color to "symbolize a brighter future" that is "free from violence." Participants of the 16D campaign across the globe can be seen in orange t-shirts, armbands and more during events and collaboration throughout the course of the 16 days.

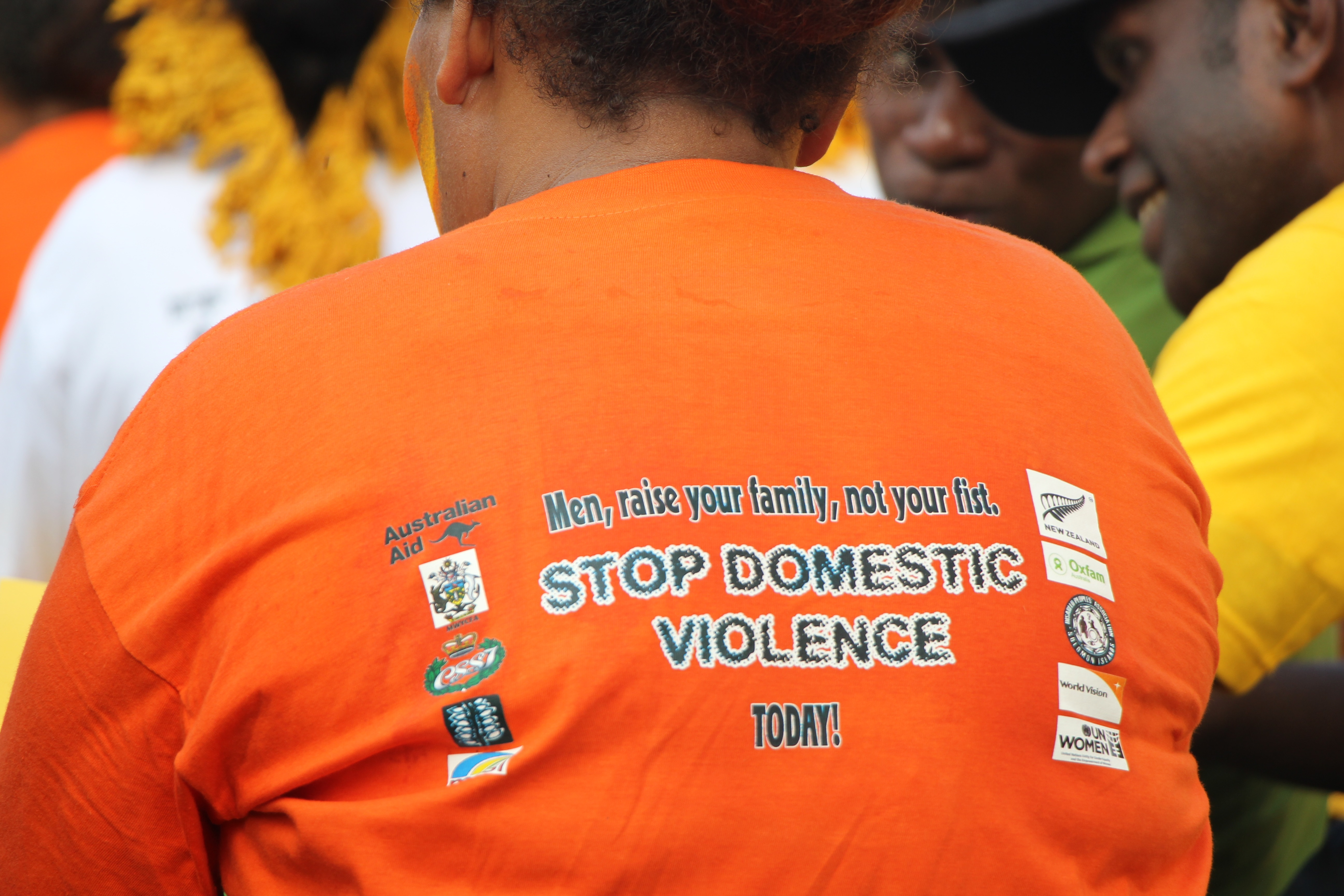
16 Days of Activism to raise awareness of the various forms of violence against women

The key strategies that the campaign prioritizes are "awareness, advocacy, prevention, survivor-centered services and an intersectional lens." By framing GBV and VAW as global human rights issues, these strategies are critical for ensuring change that will benefit all women. Organizations such as OHCHR and UNiTE are the marketing and communication powerhouses that amplify the 16D campaign message across the world, enlightening and encouraging local grassroots organizations to host their own events and raise their own awareness in their respective communities.

== Significant dates ==
The dates recognized during the course of the 16D campaign were explicitly chosen to connect conversations surrounding VAW and human rights together.

- 25 November – International Day for the Elimination of Violence Against Women
- 29 November – International Women Human Rights Defenders Day
- 1 December – World AIDS Day
- 3 December – International Day of Persons with Disabilities
- 5 December – Volunteer Day for Economic and Social Development
- 6 December – Anniversary of the Montreal Massacre, which is observed as the National Day of Remembrance and Action on Violence Against Women in Canada
- 10 December – International Human Rights Day and the anniversary of the Universal Declaration of Human Rights

== Themes over time ==
Every year, the 16D campaign either introduces a new theme, or continues an old theme. The theme focuses on one particular area of gender inequality and works to bring attention to these issues and make changes that will have an impact.

=== Early themes (1991–2000) ===
- 1991-1992: "Violence Against Women Violates Human Rights"
- 1993: "Democracy in the Family, Democracy of Families, Democracy for Every Body"
- 1994: "Awareness, Accountability, Action: Violence Against Women Violates Human Rights"
- 1995: "Vienna, Cairo, Copenhagen and Beijing: Bringing Women's Human Rights Home"
  - This campaign focused on four major conferences, including the Fourth World Conference on Women in Beijing (September 1995), which was "the third major UN conference since the World Conference on Human Rights in Vienna (1993)," and "...follows the International Conference on Population and Development (Cairo, 1994), and the World Summit on Social Development (Copenhagen, 1995)."
- 1996: "Bringing Women's Human Rights Home: Realizing Our Visions"
- 1997: "Demand Human Rights in the Home and the World"
- 1998: "Building a Culture of Respect for Human Rights"
- 1999: "Fulfilling the Promise of Freedom from Violence"
- 2000: "Celebrating the 10th Anniversary of the Campaign"
  - Participants reviewed the accomplishments of the last 10 years of the campaign.

=== Mid-development themes (2001–2016) ===
- 2001: "Racism and Sexism: No More Violence"
- 2002: "Creating a Culture that Says No to Violence Against Women"
- 2003: "Violence Against Women Violates Human Rights: Maintaining the Momentum Ten Years After Vienna"
  - Focused on reviewing changes that had occurred in the 10 years since the Vienna Declaration that was a result of the World Conference on Human Rights in Vienna (1993) and the UN General Assembly's adoption of the Declaration on the Elimination of Violence Against Women (2003).
- 2004-2005: "For the Health of Women, for the Health of the World: No More Violence"
  - Focused on the "intersection of violence against women and the HIV/AIDs pandemic."
- 2006: "Celebrate 16 Years of 16 Days: Advance Human Rights ←> End Violence Against Women"
  - Celebrated not only those who had contributed to the campaign, but those who had given their lives or suffered violence during their fight against gender inequality.
- 2007: "Demanding Implementation, Challenging Obstacles: End Violence Against Women"
- 2008: "Human Rights for Women ←> Human Rights for All: UDHR60"
  - Celebrated the 60th anniversary of the Universal Declaration of Human Rights.
- 2009: "Commit, Act, Demand: We CAN End Violence Against Women!"
- 2010: "Structures of Violence: Defining the Intersection of Militarism and Violence Against Women"
  - Celebrated the 20th anniversary of the campaign
- 2011-2014: "From Peace in the Home to Peace in the World: Let's Challenge Militarism and End Violence Against Women!"
- 2015-2016: "From Peace in the Home to Peace in the World: Make Education Safe for All!"

=== Recent themes (2019–2023) ===
- 2019: "Ending Gender-Based Violence in the World of Work"
- 2020: "Ending Gender-Based Violence in the World of Work with a focus on informal women workers affected by the Covid-19 pandemic"
  - Continued the multi-year theme of Ending GBV in the World of Work with a special focus on informal women workers who were most affected by the COVID-19 pandemic.
- 2021: "Domestic Violence and the World of Work"
  - Celebrated the 30th anniversary of the campaign
- 2022: "Ending Femicide"
  - Contained a special focus on groups of women who are more vulnerable to femicide.^{[4]}
- 2023: "Invest to Prevent Violence Against Women and Girls"

=== Current themes (2024–present) ===
- 2024: "Femi(ni)cide in Focus"
- 2025: "Gender Apartheid"
- 2026: "#NoExcuse for Online Abuse"

== How to get involved ==
Every individual can benefit from participating in the 16D campaign and its goal to eliminate VAWG and its "long-term health, social and economic consequences." The World Health Organization describes four different ways that one can contribute to the cause:

- Allyship: this looks like "challeng[ing] unequal gender norms, sexist behaviors and comments in your homes, communities, workplaces and with your friends, relatives and colleagues."
- Support: this means prioritizing empathy and supporting "without judgement, to access services and help."
- Advocacy: this is working with "governments and donors to finance and invest in evidence-based prevention and response."
- Intention: this looks like "integrat[ing] response and prevention services in development and humanitarian contexts."

By having conversations, interacting with organizations and campaigns online, urging government collaboration and continuing to foster support worldwide to fight against GBV and contribute to elimination of VAWG and its repercussions.
