= News Literacy Project =

American nonprofit combating misinformation

- Abbreviation: NLP
- Formation: 2008; 18 years ago
- Founder: Alan C. Miller
- Founded at: Washington, D.C., United States
- Type: Nonprofit
- Legal status: Active
- Purpose: To provide resources for educators, students, and the general public to help them learn to identify credible information, recognize misinformation and disinformation, and determine what they can trust, share, and act on.
- Products: Checkology virtual classroom, NewsLitCamp, Informable mobile app, The Sift, Get Smart About News, RumorGuard, Misinformation Dashboard: Election 2024, Is That a Fact? podcast
- Services: News literacy education, resources, and training.
- Fields: Education, media literacy, information literacy
- Official language: English
- CEO: Charles Salter
- Board Chair: Karen Wickre
- Vice Chair: Walt Mossberg
- Board of directors: Karen Wickre (Chair), Walt Mossberg (Vice Chair), Tucker Eskew, Eva Haller, Abby Phillip, Liz Ramos
- Key people: Alan C. Miller (Founder)
- Awards: David M. Rubenstein Prize (2023), Webby People's Voice Award (2024), HundrED Spotlight on Digital Wellbeing award (2019)
- Website: newslit.org

The News Literacy Project (NLP) is an American nonpartisan national education nonprofit, based in Washington, D.C., that provides resources for educators, students, and the general public to help them learn to identify credible information, recognize misinformation and disinformation, and determine what they can trust, share, and act on. It was founded in 2008 by Alan C. Miller, a Pulitzer Prize-winning investigative reporter at the Los Angeles Times Washington bureau.

As an academic discipline, news literacy is widely considered a subset of media literacy and information literacy. The American Society of News Editors' Youth Journalism Initiative defines news literacy as "the acquisition of 21st-century, critical-thinking skills for analyzing and judging the reliability of news and information, differentiating among facts, opinions and assertions in the media we consume, create and distribute. It can be taught most effectively in cross-curricular, inquiry-based formats at all grade levels. It is a necessary component for literacy in contemporary society.”

== History ==
In 2006, Miller was invited to tell 175 sixth-grade students at his daughter's middle school in Bethesda, Maryland, what he did as a journalist and why it was important. When the students responded with 175 handwritten thank-you notes, he began to think about the impact that many journalists could have if they shared their expertise and experience in classrooms across the country.

The idea seemed particularly meaningful as more and more Americans, young and old, were turning to social media as a news source, and as it was becoming increasingly challenging to distinguish fact-based news from spin, misinformation and raw information. Two years later, Miller left the Times and founded NLP.

Its lessons and materials, initially aimed at educators and students in middle school and high school, "are apolitical, created with input from real journalists," Mark Sullivan and Tim Bajarin of Fast Company wrote in 2018. "It teaches students how to recognize the earmarks of quality journalism and credible information, and how to know if articles are accurate and appropriately sourced. It teaches kids to categorize information, make and critique news judgments, detect and dissect viral rumors, interpret and apply the First Amendment, and recognize confirmation bias."

In September 2020, NLP announced that it was making its programs for schools available at no charge and was expanding its work to include resources for the general public. Three years later, NLP returned to its roots to concentrate on K-12 education programming; in August 2024, the organization made a "strategic pivot" that "tightens our focus on bringing systemic change to public education at a national scale" — including support for legislation in all 50 states that would require news literacy classes in schools.

Miller retired as CEO on June 30, 2022. He was succeeded by Charles Salter, NLP's president and chief operating officer.

== NLP board ==
Members of NLP's board of directors have backgrounds in journalism, communications, education, technology, and philanthropy. The board chair is Karen Wickre, a former communications executive at Google and Twitter; Walt Mossberg, former technology columnist at The Wall Street Journal and co-founder of the tech website Recode, is vice chair. Among the current board members are Tucker Eskew, a political and communications strategist who was deputy assistant to the President for media affairs and global communications under President George W. Bush; philanthropist Eva Haller; Abby Phillip, the anchor of CNN's NewsNight with Abby Phillip; and Liz Ramos, a U.S. history and government teacher at Alta Loma High School in Rancho Cucamonga, California.

Past board members include Donald A. Baer, a former senior advisor to President Bill Clinton and former worldwide chair and CEO of Burson-Marsteller; Alison Bernstein, a director of the Institute for Women's Leadership at Rutgers University and a former program officer at the Ford Foundation; John Carroll, former editor of the Los Angeles Times, the Baltimore Sun, and the Lexington Herald-Leader; Michael Gerson, a Washington Post opinion columnist and former chief speechwriter for President George W. Bush; Gwen Ifill, moderator of PBS's Washington Week and co-anchor of the PBS NewsHour; Greg McCaffery, the former chairman, CEO, and president of Bloomberg Industry Group; and Vivian Schiller, former president and CEO of NPR.

== Resources and programs ==
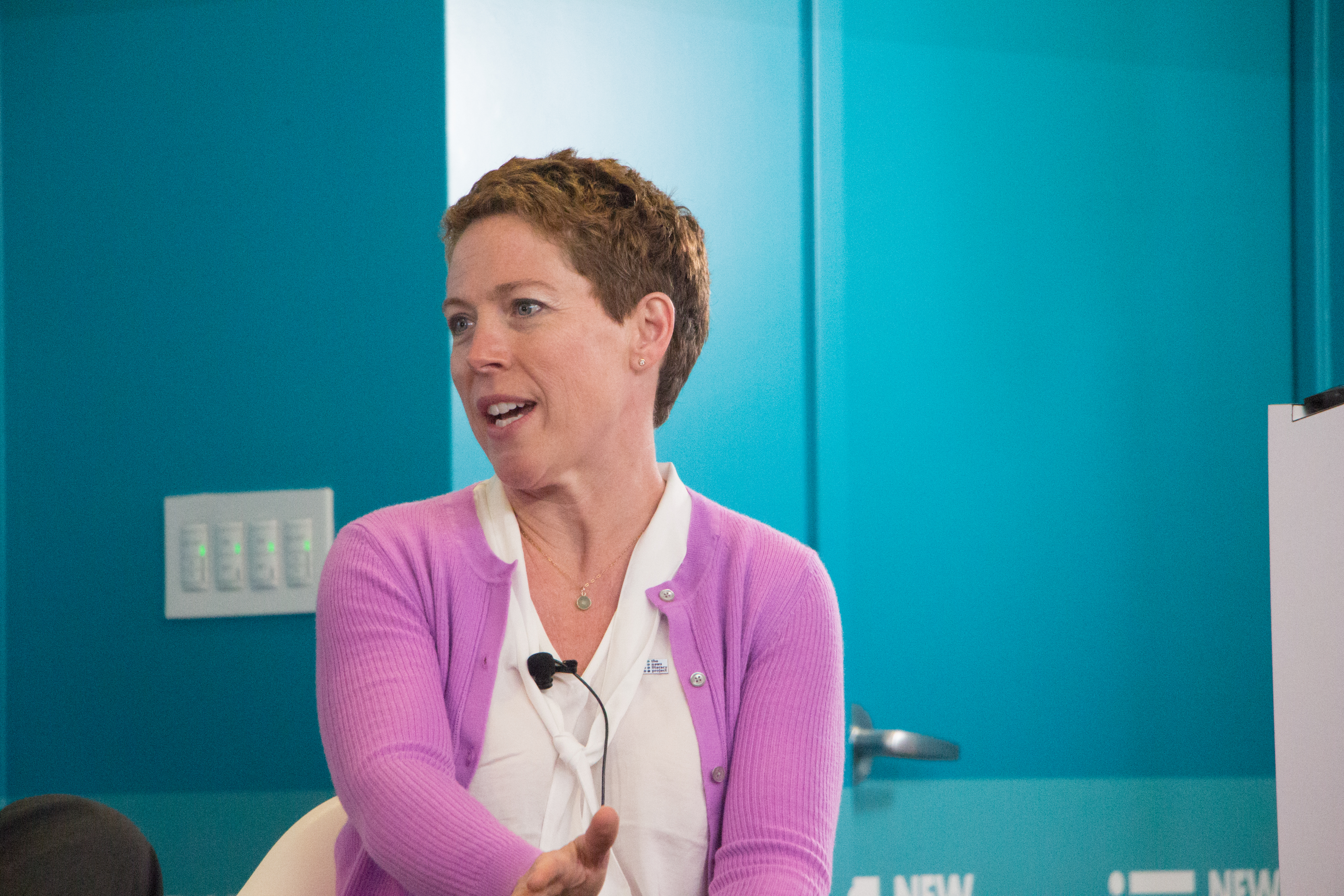
Patricia Hunt, a teacher in Arlington Public Schools, speaks on behalf of the News Literacy Project at a 2018 New America event.

Introduced in 2016, the Checkology virtual classroom is a browser-based platform with interactive lessons, hosted by journalists and subject matter experts, that examine topics such as "Introduction to Algorithms," "Misinformation," "Conspiratorial Thinking," "Understanding Bias," and "The First Amendment." The international education nonprofit HundrED, which identifies "inspiring innovations" in K-12 education, named the platform as a winner of its 2019 Spotlight on Digital Wellbeing award. In April 2024, Checkology received a Webby People's Voice Award in the category of Websites and Mobile Sites: Responsible Information, which "recognizes products, platforms, software and other technologies working to combat disinformation, misinformation and false or misleading information online."

In addition to its student-centered programming, NLP has held webinars in conjunction with AARP's Older Adults Technology Services to help older people learn to identify inaccurate information online and provide them with the tools and knowledge needed to verify factual information.

Two weekly newsletters — The Sift (for educators) and Get Smart About News (for the general public) — discuss news literacy topics, including viral rumors and journalism ethics. NLP's RumorGuard website identifies and debunks examples of viral misinformation; in 2023 the American Association of School Librarians included the platform in its list of "best digital tools for teaching and learning." In August 2024 NLP launched Misinformation Dashboard: Election 2024 to counter rampant misinformation and disinformation related to the presidential election.

NewsLitCamp is a day-long professional development program for educators, held in conjunction with one or more news outlets.

NLP also operates a three-year District Fellowship program that includes a $30,000 grant to help participating school districts develop and implement news-literacy instruction.

The Informable mobile app helps users practice distinct types of news literacy skills in a game-like format. When Informable was released in December 2019, Apple's App Store included it in its "Apps We Love Right Now" list.

In September 2020, NLP developed a podcast, Is That a Fact?, where journalists, educators, and experts on misinformation and disinformation discuss news literacy topics with NLP staff. Guests have included Maria Ressa, chief executive officer of the digital news site Rappler and winner of the Nobel Peace Prize; tech journalist Kara Swisher, a co-founder of Recode and a former contributor to The New York Times' Opinion section; Dr. Vivek Murthy, the U.S. surgeon general; Michael Luo, the editor of The New Yorker's website; and Joan Donovan, research director at Harvard University's Shorenstein Center on Media, Politics and Public Policy.

=== National News Literacy Week ===
NLP and The E.W. Scripps Co. sponsor National News Literacy Week, an annual public awareness campaign "to promote news literacy as a fundamental life skill and to provide the public with the tools needed to be an informed and empowered populace." The first National News Literacy Week was held Jan. 27–31, 2020.

== Honors and awards ==
NLP was the 2023 winner of the David M. Rubenstein Prize, the highest honor of the Library of Congress's Literacy Awards Program. The $150,000 prize is presented annually on International Literacy Day (September 8) to an organization that "has demonstrated exceptional and sustained depth in its commitment to the advancement of literacy" and meets "the highest standards of excellence in its operations and services."

== See also ==
- Media Literacy Now

== External resources ==
- Official website
