= Anita Miller (urbanist) =

American urban renewal pioneer

Anita Miller (born April 20, 1931) is an American urbanist working in the field of urban revitalization and policy areas such as reverse mortgages, tenant management, anti-redlining initiatives and comprehensive community development. She is the first woman to have served as a senior program officer at the Ford Foundation and as a board member of a federal financial regulatory agency (the Federal Home Loan Bank Board).

== Early life ==
She was born in Brooklyn, New York, and grew up in Mount Vernon, New York. She attended Wheaton College (1948-49) and the University of Michigan (1949-51). She married Martin Miller in 1952; they raised their three children — Alan Miller, Tracy Miller and Cheryl Houser — primarily in Ridgewood, New Jersey.

== Career ==
A longtime member of the American Civil Liberties Union, Miller began working on housing issues as a volunteer in 1956 while living in Providence, Rhode Island. She played a leadership role in the state's struggle for fair housing legislation, served on the city's Minority Group Housing Problems committee and founded the Rhode Island Conference on Intergroup Relations. She received the National Conference of Christians and Jews' National Brotherhood Award in 1964 for her work in Providence.

In 1964, after the family moved to New York City, she became a staff consultant in urban affairs at the Union of American Hebrew Congregations (UAHC) in New York City, where she "stimulated and staffed" the organization's co-sponsorship of a large-scale community development project in East Harlem. She also headed the city's Workable Housing Program Committee, establishing a program to relocate tenants living in areas slated for redevelopment.

== Ford Foundation ==
She joined the Ford Foundation in 1972 as a consultant, winning promotions to program officer and senior program officer in the Department of Urban and Metropolitan Development. She assumed direct responsibility for a new area of interest — housing and neighborhood conservation — working with about 50 housing programs nationwide and about $15 million in grant funds. In 1976 she joined the board of the Federal Savings and Loan Advisory Council.

On April 7, 1978, President Jimmy Carter nominated Miller as a member of the Federal Home Loan Bank Board, the regulatory agency for the savings and loan industry. She was confirmed later that month and was sworn in on May 4, 1978. She served as acting chairman of the board from July 7, 1979, to September 7, 1979.

She resigned from the board in November 1979, returning to the Ford Foundation to focus on revitalization projects in the South Bronx — an area of burned-out buildings and empty lots that Carter had visited in 1977. "At that time, the general feeling was that the problem was so large that, without concerted government effort, no one could do anything. Carter's visit helped change that whole environment," she told Jill Jonnes, the author of the 2002 book South Bronx Rising: The rise, fall and resurrection of an American city. "When I came back from Washington, D.C., Frank Thomas, the new president at Ford, said, 'Let's take another look.'"

In 1981 she was recruited by Mitchell Sviridoff, the former head of domestic programs at the Ford Foundation, to join the Local Initiatives Support Corporation (LISC), a nonprofit community development financial institution that the foundation had created two years previously. Her most prominent role in urban revitalization was the transformation of Charlotte Street, the rubble-strewn lot in the South Bronx that both Carter and Ronald Reagan (as a presidential candidate) had visited to highlight urban blight.

Working with Edward J. Logue, the head of the South Bronx Development Corporation, and LISC, Miller was instrumental in the effort in 1983 to bring in 89 single-family, suburban-style homes — complete with white picket fences — as an alternative to high-rise public housing. As recounted by Alexander von Hoffman in his book House by House, Block by Block: The Rebirth of America's Urban Neighborhoods, one of Logue's and Miller's early conversations over lunch went like this: "'Anita,' he said, 'I can see the white picket fences right now.' 'You're crazy,' she replied. 'How much money do you need?'"

Charlotte Gardens received considerable attention and became a national model for stimulating the rejuvenation and economic integration of urban areas. In 1997, President Bill Clinton visited the site as a symbol of urban rebirth; 12 years later, CNN Money called it "one of the greatest real estate turnarounds ever."

Miller further refined and expanded this approach, working with the Surdna Foundation to create the Comprehensive Community Revitalization Program (CCRP) in 1992. "If there was one person in New York who was able to recognize the paradox of a miraculous physical renaissance occurring in the midst of woefully inadequate human supports, it was Anita Miller," wrote Marvin Miller in his book The Builders. "Well connected to everyone who mattered in both the public and private sectors, Anita Miller not only recognized the paradox but was bursting to do something about it."

== South Bronx ==
Centered in the South Bronx, CCRP was the first urban renewal program to go beyond a focus on housing alone, bringing together local government, financial institutions and community development groups to integrate job creation and training, public safety, health services, recreation, open spaces and child care with affordable housing to rebuild distressed neighborhoods from the ground up. Genevieve "Jenny" Brooks of the Mid-Bronx Desperadoes, one of the community development corporations (CDCs) that Miller funded, was instrumental in both Charlotte Gardens and this later effort.

Miller "was the A-quality management that the initial funders banked on even before the CCRP strategy was fully developed," Sviridoff told Martin Mayer. "In the pioneer days [of urban revitalization] there was no more adventurous philanthropist than Anita Miller," von Hoffman wrote.

She subsequently worked closely with Andy Mooney, the leader of LISC's high-profile Chicago office, to replicate that approach. She detailed the CCRP model in Going Comprehensive: Anatomy of an Initiative that Worked, a 2006 book written with Tom Burns of the OMG Center for Collaborative Development.

She also played a central role in the genesis of three major policy initiatives:

- At the Ford Foundation, she worked with Richard Baron of McCormick Baron Salazar and the United States Department of Housing and Urban Development to develop a national demonstration project in St. Louis, Missouri, to showcase the first tenant management of public housing.
- Working with a Ford Foundation grantee, she developed the reverse mortgage, which enables homeowners to borrow against the equity in their homes. She provided the funding for a demonstration project in San Francisco, California.
- At the Federal Home Loan Bank Board, she led the fight among regulators to carry out the congressional mandate to end redlining, the lending practices that discriminated against individuals and communities.
