= Mabel Smith Douglass =

Mabel Smith Douglass (February 11, 1874 – September 21, 1933) was the first dean, in 1918, of the New Jersey College for Women in New Brunswick, New Jersey. In 1955, the college was renamed Douglass College in her honor. Douglass College is now part of Rutgers University and the library is named for Mabel Smith Douglass. The library "has a primary collection focus on women’s, gender, and sexuality studies. It is also home to the Performing Arts Library and the New Brunswick Libraries media collection."

== Life ==
Douglass was appointed the first dean of the New Jersey College for Women when it opened in 1918 with 54 students and some 16 faculty members. With her commitment to providing women a four-year college education and outstanding leadership, Douglass spent the next 14 years shaping the college and was instrumental in helping students rise to success.

Douglass attended public school in Jersey City. In 1899 she graduated from Barnard College in New York City. In 1903, she married William Shipman Douglass, owner of a shipping business. They had two children: a son, William Shipman Douglass Jr. and daughter, Edith Douglass. Following the death of her husband, Mabel Smith Douglass managed the family business, W. S. Douglass & Co., a butter, egg, and cheese business.

== Death ==
In September 1932 Douglass retired due to ill health. On September 21, 1933, she went rowing on Lake Placid and never returned. She was last seen rowing alone across the lake by servants at a camp she owned. Her boat was found capsized near the shore of the deepest part of the lake, three miles opposite her starting point. Police dredged the lake and searched the surrounding mountain trails, to no avail. Thirty years later, her remarkably preserved remains were found by scuba divers on a shelf about 95 feet below the water's surface.
