= Joint Center for Housing Studies =

Research center at Harvard University

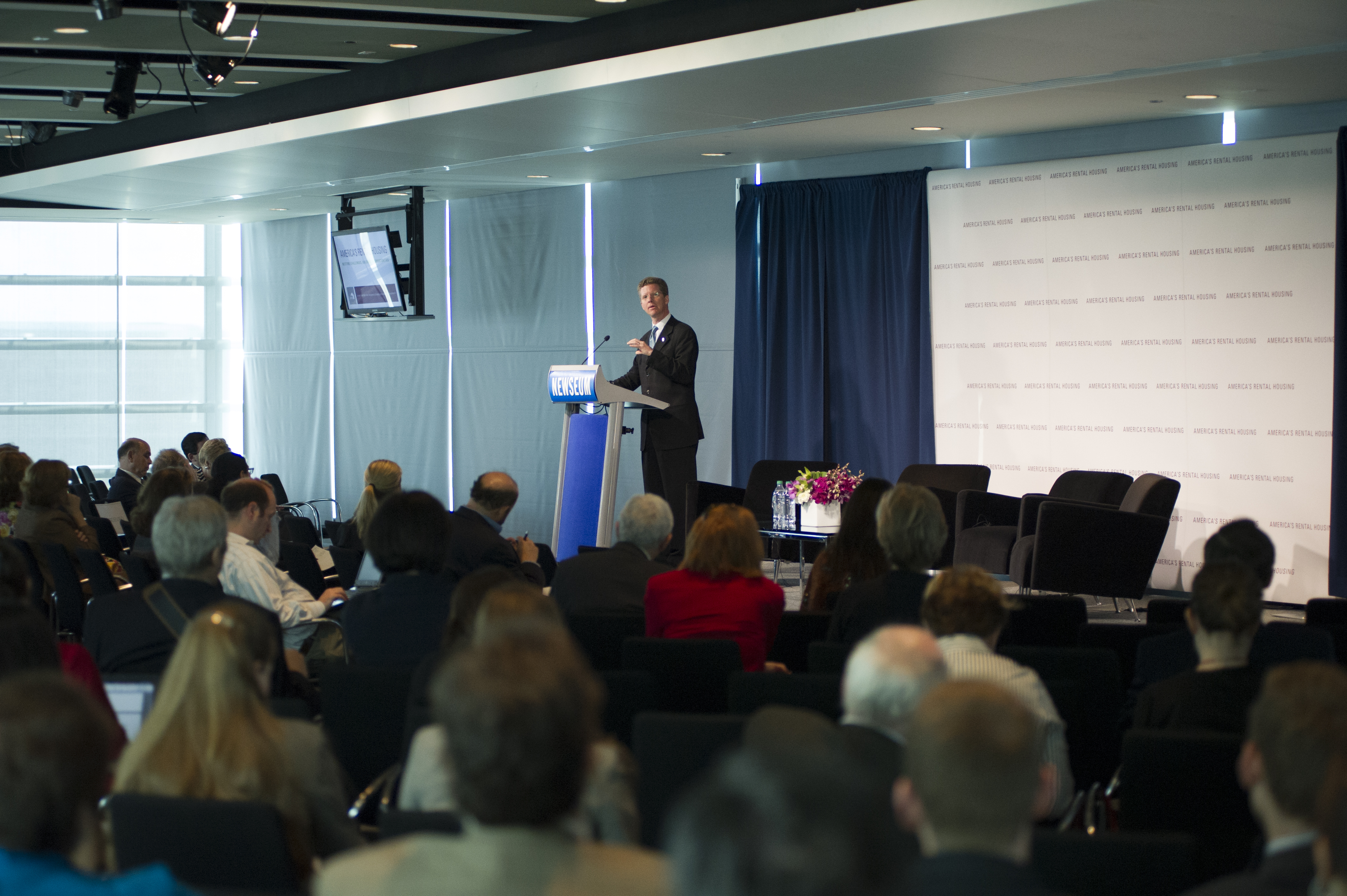
- Shaun Donovan delivering a keynote at the Joint Center for Housing Studies in 2011.
- Former names: Harvard–MIT Joint Center for Urban Studies
- Type: Research center
- Established: 1959
- Founders: Harvard University; Massachusetts Institute of Technology
- Parent institution: Harvard University
- Affiliations: Graduate School of Design; Harvard Kennedy School
- Director: Christopher Herbert
- Location: 1 Bow Street, Suite 400, Cambridge, Massachusetts, 02138, United States; 42.37°N 71.12°W
- Language: English
- Website: jchs.harvard.edu

The Joint Center for Housing Studies is a research center on housing-related issues at Harvard Kennedy School at Harvard University in Cambridge, Massachusetts. Through its research, education, and public outreach programs, the center helps leaders in government, business, and the civic sectors make decisions that effectively address the needs of cities and communities.

== History ==
The center was formed in 1959 under the leadership of Martin Meyerson, its founding director, as the Harvard–MIT Joint Center for Urban Studies, to address intellectual and policy issues confronting a nation experiencing widespread demographic, economic and social change. Its research was based on the premise that the resolution of these issues called for imaginative interdisciplinary approaches to the study of urban problems and issues, and required cooperation among universities, government and industry.

In 1989, a split was made from the Massachusetts Institute of Technology, and became affiliated solely with Harvard's Graduate School of Design and Harvard Kennedy School. The center consolidated the focus on housing that had emerged during the 1970s, and changed the ending of its name from Urban Studies to Housing Studies.

An annual lecture in honor of John Thomas Dunlop is administered by the Joint Center for Housing Studies. Notable keynotes include: Herbert Kohler Jr. (2001); Angelo Mozilo (2002); Henry Cisneros (2003); Kim B. Clark (2004); Jack Kemp (2005); Lewis Ranieri (2008); Shaun Donovan (2009); Marc Morial (2010); Jonathan Reckford (2011); Mel Martínez (2012); Ron Terwilliger (2013); Jonathan F. P. Rose (2014); Marty Walsh (2017); Raphael Bostic (2018); Kim Dowdell (2019); and Michael Maltzan (2020).

== Directors ==
- Martin Meyerson (1959-1963)
- James Q. Wilson (1963-1966)
- Daniel Patrick Moynihan (1966-1969)
- Robert Coldwell Wood (1969-1970)
- Walter Rosenblith (1970-1971)
- Bernard Frieden (1971-1975)
- Arthur Solomon (1975-1980)
- David Kresge (1980-1982)
- H. James Brown (1982-1996)
- John R. Meyer and Gerald McCue (1996-1998)
- Nicolas Retsinas (1998-2010)
- Eric Belsky (2010-2014)
- Christopher Herbert (2014-present)

== Notable affiliates ==
- Rahul Mehrotra, architect and urban designer
- Toshiko Mori, architect
- Alexander von Hoffman, urban planner and historian
