= Gender Equality Architecture Reform =

Campaign

Gender Equality Architecture Reform Campaign
- Formation: February 2008
- Type: INGO
- Purpose: Promote women's development
- Website: www.gearcampaign.org/index.php

The Gender Equality Architecture Reform (GEAR) campaign was a network of over 300 women's, human rights and social justice groups around the world. The GEAR campaign urged UN Member States and the UN Secretariat to move swiftly forward to create a new UN gender equality entity. GEAR also urges the UN to set up a transparent process now for recruiting the best qualified Under Secretary-General to head this agency. The United Nations must move without further delay to implement changes that it has repeatedly recognized as critical to fulfilling its mandate of working for gender equality as a crucial component of development, human rights, peace, and security.

== Background ==
In 2006, former Secretary-General of the United Nations Kofi Annan convened a High-Level Panel to explore how the UN system could be strengthened in terms of coherence and coordination in the areas of development, humanitarian affairs and the environment. After women from around the world pressured the UN to better address gender equality in the reform process, Kofi Annan asked the Panel to include gender equality as its mandate. The Panel's report included recommendations on strengthening the gender equality architecture (GEA), and was endorsed by the current Secretary-General of the United Nations Ban Ki-moon in March 2007.

== Campaign ==
In March 2007, the Women's Environment & Development Organization (WEDO), together with the Center for Women's Global Leadership (CWGL) convened a meeting of 50 women activists from around the world, to develop a comprehensive and multi-faceted strategy for global, regional and national action to gain the UN General Assembly's approval of a stronger and single, fully resourced women's entity at the UN. As a result of that meeting and the continued need for women's collaborative advocacy on this issue, WEDO and the CWGL, along with hundreds of activists spanning all regions, launched the Gender Equality Architecture Reform (GEAR) Campaign in February 2008, to mobilize women's groups and allies to push for the adoption of the new UN entity for gender equality and women's empowerment. Regional groups such as the African Women's Development and Communication Network were mobilized to support the campaign.

On June 14, 2010, Charlotte Bunch, on behalf of the GEAR Campaign, spoke at the UN Millennium Development Goals Informal Interactive Hearings. The audience at these hearings included the UN General Assembly, civil society organizations and the private sector. Bunch spoke about the urgency in establishing the new gender entity and articulated the linkages between gender equality, human rights and the MDGs in an effort to address the gaps on the ground in implementing promises that have been made by governments and the UN. The meeting was convened in order to provide input to the preparatory process for the "MDG summit" (High-level Plenary Meeting) on September 20–22, 2010.

== Results ==
On June 30, 2010, the United Nations General Assembly resolution was agreed to and subsequently formally adopted by the General Assembly on Friday, 2 July, to establish "UN Women", the new gender equality entity at the UN. This new gender entity already has an operational website.

== See also ==
- Special Measures for Gender Equality in the United Nations (UN)
