= Labor feminism =

Branch of feminism

Labor feminism was a women's movement in the United States that emerged in the 1920s, focused on gaining rights in the workplace and unions. Labor feminists advocated for protectionist legislation and special benefits for women, a variant of social feminism. They helped pass state laws regulating working conditions for women, expanded women's participation in unions, and organized to oppose the Equal Rights Amendment.

The term was coined by historian Dorothy Sue Cobble in her book, The Other Women’s Movement (2005).

== 1920s to 1970s ==
After gaining the right to vote, the National Woman's Party proposed the Equal Rights Amendment (ERA). The ERA was bitterly opposed by the social feminists who saw it as undermining many of the gains they had made in the treatment of women workers. The charge was led by labor feminists, who were the successors to Progressive Era social feminists. Labor feminists did not want to end all distinctions based on sex, only those that hurt women. For example, they felt that state laws that put in place wage floors and hour ceilings benefited women. Thus, they continued to advocate for protectionist legislation and special benefits for women. In addition to state wage laws, they sought to expand maternity leave, health coverage during childbirth, and disability and unemployment coverage for mothers. Their view was that women had different needs than men and should not be penalized for performing the function of motherhood. The conflict between social feminists and equal rights feminists was exacerbated by their different identities. Social feminists tended to be working-class women of various races whereas equal rights feminists were upper middle-class white women for the most part. Their different experiences impacted the way they believed legislation should work.

By the 1940s, labor feminists began to broaden their advocacy efforts at the national level. Led by prominent labor figures such as Esther Peterson, an AFL–CIO lobbyist, and Myra Wolfgang, a trade union leader, labor feminists came together at the Women's Bureau at the U.S. Department of Labor to advance their social reform agenda. This included equal pay for comparable work, shorter workdays for women and men, and social welfare support for childbearing and childrearing. In 1945, they introduced the Equal Pay Act in Congress, which sought to abolish wage disparity based on sex. Their version of the bill, which was different than what passed in 1963, advocated for equal pay for comparable work in addition to same work because employers often undervalued the contributions of women in roles that women tended to occupy. Labor feminists re-introduced the bill every year until 1963 when the Equal Pay Act was passed.

During this time, labor feminists also expanded women's participation in unions. They viewed union organization as an effective way to pressure employers to close the gender wage gap. In 1947, they helped orchestrate the largest walkout of women in U.S. history when 230,000 telephone operators nationwide went on strike against AT&T, cutting off telephone service at the White House. The merger of the AFL and CIO in 1955 created a unified labor movement with greater political and economic power. The AFL–CIO adopted the CIO position on equal pay, and by the late 1950s, federal equal pay legislation became a priority of the merged organization.

Women's Status Bill (1946), established as a way to meet the threat of the ERA, aimed to investigate the status of women and the discrimination they faced. Specifically, the bill proposed the establishment of a nine-member commission appointed by the President. This commission would conduct a thorough investigation into the economic, civil, social, and political status of women across the United States, its territories, and possessions.

In 1960, President Kennedy appointed Peterson the Director of the Women's Bureau, and she became the highest-ranking woman in President Kennedy's administration. In her new position, Peterson helped draft a report for the Presidential Commission on the Status of Women (PCSW). The PCSW had been established by President Kennedy in 1961 to examine the gains of women and role of government in addressing the changing needs of women and their families. Their report American Women published in 1963 expressed a desire for the elimination of gender difference, but not where it would remove protections for working-class women. It was a far-reaching document that offered many comprehensive recommendations focused on not only working women, but minority women as well. It recommended income guarantees for pregnant and unemployed women, childcare services, better tax policies, and changes to the Social Security system. However, American Women was not free of critics and many had contrary opinions on how they viewed the document. Early critics believed it encouraged women to move away from their home responsibilities, but later critics believed that the document focused too much on mothers and not enough on working-class women.

== Legal debate over the ERA ==
Labor feminists supported the Hayden Rider to the ERA, which said that the ERA could not impair any existing benefits conferred to women. Many labor feminists, including Peterson, believed that legislation could promote equality and special benefits for women and did not see these as incompatible. These feminists located women's rights within a framework of women's service as workers and homemakers, rather than the framework of liberal individualism used by equal rights feminists. Legal scholars challenged the idea of a legally viable model of promoting equal rights that did not erode those protections already in place for women. First, they argued that this would be problematic from an application standpoint. Legislation that afforded privileges to women that were not available to men would be valid, but disabilities imposed on women because of their sex would be invalidated. Deciding when a statute conferred a benefit rather than a disability would be difficult. Second, they argued it was problematic from a sociological standpoint. Legal constructions of difference reinforced cultural stereotypes and limited the definition of the role of women. While there were valid biological differences between men and women, it was thought that these definitions invoked generalities and ignored the capabilities of the individual.

== Decline in labor feminism ==
The labor movement remained a powerful presence throughout the 1950s and early 1960s. The passage of the Equal Pay Act in 1963 without the desired comparable pay language represented a significant defeat for labor feminists and shifted the terms of the debate with equal rights feminists. ERA supporters had opposed the language out of a desire for true equality. Labor feminists remained united in their opposition that the ERA would erase protectionist legislation, but split in their approach as it became apparent that they would not be able to achieve expansions of equality without sacrificing some protections. The passage of Title VII in 1963 further undermined their position. Protectionist legislation violated Title VII's prohibitions against discrimination based on sex.

The rapidly changing economic and cultural landscape of the 1960s contributed to the successes of equal rights feminists over labor feminists. One of the biggest opponents of comparable pay language had been American businesses. In the aftermath of World War II, American businesses flourished, and the power of the American business lobby grew. US business leaders opposed government support for people not in the labor force and government intervention in the labor force. As the federal government retreated from the private sector, it left the task of caring for workers to employers. In the backdrop of the Cold War, American politicians and the public interpreted this economic success as validation of American ideals of individualism and free enterprise, which provided further justification for the emerging corporate welfare state and opposition toward socialist measures.

By the 1970s, there was a decline in labor feminism. Some labor feminists hoped that the movement could regroup around an agenda of equal rights and equal opportunity. A group of labor women helped secure support for the ERA from the United Auto Workers, the American Federation of Teachers, the Newspaper Guild, and the International Brotherhood of Teamsters. The Women's Bureau switched its position on the ERA in 1970. In 1971, Peterson also changed her mind, reasoning that history was moving in this direction. However, some labor feminists, including Wolfgang, remained staunchly opposed and testified against the ERA in Congress. The passage of the ERA in 1972 enabled equal rights feminism to solidify its place as the dominant women's movement in the US.

== See also ==
- Protective laws

== Sources ==
- Cavanagh, Barbara K. (1970–1971). "A Little Dearer than his Horse: Legal Stereotypes and the Feminine Personality". Harvard Civil Rights-Civil Liberties Law Review. 6.
- Cobble, Dorothy Sue (August 2005). "The Forgotten American Feminists". Bulletin of the Society for the Study of Working Women. 48.
- Cobble, Dorothy Sue (2004). The Other Women's Movement: Workplace Justice and Social Rights in Modern America. Princeton University Press. ISBN 9780691123684.
- Kessler-Harris, Alice (2001). In Pursuit of Equity. Oxford University Press. ISBN 0195158024.
- Klein, Jennifer (2003). For All These Rights. Business, Labor, and the Shaping of America's Public-Private Welfare State. Princeton: Princeton University Press. ISBN 9780691126050.
- Kurland, Phillip B. (1970–1971). "The Equal Rights Amendment: Some Problems of Construction". Harvard Civil Rights-Civil Liberties Law Review. 6.
- Mead, Margaret; Kaplan, Frances B. (1965). American Women: The US President's Commission on the Status of Women.
- Bonnie G. Smith, ed. (2008). "Social Feminism". Oxford Encyclopedia of Women in World History. Oxford University Press. ISBN 9780195148909.
