= Mary S. Hartman =

- Born: 1941 (age 84–85)
- Occupation: Director of the Women's Studies Institute of the Douglass History Department

Mary S. Hartman (born 1941) joined the Douglass History Department in 1968 and served as director of the Women’s Studies Institute from 1975 to 1977.

She was named acting dean in 1981, and named dean in 1982. As dean, she instituted a number of nationally acclaimed programs for women, including the Douglass Project for Rutgers Women in Math, Science, and Engineering; the Center for Women's Global Leadership; the Laurie New Jersey Chair in Women's Studies; and the Institute for Women's Leadership. Further, she gathered the first organization of Faculty Fellows committed to the Douglass College mission within the context of the reorganized University. She resigned 1995 in order to become director of the Institute for Women's Leadership at Rutgers University.

== Books ==
Mary S. Hartman is the author of several books including Household and the Making of History: A Subversive View of the Western Past, (Cambridge University Press, 2004); her first book, Victorian Murderesses: A True History of Thirteen Respectable French and English Women Accused of Unspeakable Crimes (Schocken, 1977) was a selection of the Literary Guild book club.

== Education ==
- B.A., Swarthmore College, 1963;
- M.A., 1964, Columbia University and
- Ph.D., 1969, Columbia University.
