= Women's Environment and Development Organization =

The Women's Environment & Development Organization (WEDO) is an international non-governmental organization based in New York City, U.S. that advocates women's equality in global policy. Its early successes included achieving gender equality in the final documents of Agenda 21 and the Rio Declaration. In 2006, the organization was named as an international Champion of the Earth by the United Nations Environment Programme.

WEDO was founded in 1990 by two former United States Congresswoman Bella Abzug and Mim Kelber, who was a feminist activist. Several pioneers have also contributed to the development of this organization such as Thais Corral, Jocelyn Dow, Wangari Maathai, Brownie Ledbetter, Chief Bisi Ogunleye, and Vandana Shiva. The organization fights for women's rights on an international level through a series of worldwide conferences and actions.

WEDO plays an important role in promoting justice by strengthening global and local advocacy systems. The organization includes a Technical Advisor, an Advocate, Facilitator and Convener, Trainer, Organizer, and Knowledge Creator. All these roles help in advocating for women's human rights by advising, analyzing, and leading a set of several actions to let government and United Nations agencies understand the importance of the implementation of development policies for women across the world.

The organization focuses on six key areas; Climate Policy, Sustainable Cities & Transport, Disaster Risk Reduction, Biodiversity, Peace, Conflict, & Natural Resources, and International Finance & Trade.

The organization has also developed the Gender Climate Tracker App. The app allows users to access any information, policies, and laws governments from around the world have established on climate change. The app was created following the Paris Climate Agreement in collaboration with the governments of Finland and Switzerland, as well as Global Gender and Climate Alliance (GGCA). The organization hopes that users will take advantage of the app by using it to keep governments and officials accountable for following through on any commitments made.

WEDO also started the “Feminist Agenda for a Green New Deal” with 13 other partners. The coalition analyzes how feminist principles on intersectional gender inequality cross-cut with climate change in order to try to establish a healthier planet in the future. The website states that a Green New Deal must be guided by principles of justice and accountability, as well as listing principles for action.

WEDO and the Center for Women's Global Leadership launched the Gender Equality Architecture Reform (GEAR) Campaign in February 2008 to mobilize women's groups and allies to push for the adoption of the new UN entity for gender equality and women's empowerment.

Priority projects include MisFortune500.org, climate change advocacy, and UN Reform.

== See also ==
- Wangari Maathai
- Vandana Shiva
