= Alexander von Hoffman =

American urban planner and historian (born 1951)

- Born: Alexander Carl von Hoffman; July 11, 1951 (age 75); United States
- Occupations: Urban planner Historian
- Spouse: Glenna Lang
- Children: Esmé von Hoffman
- Parent(s): Nicholas von Hoffman (father); Anne Cremin Byrne (mother)

Academic background
- Education: Harvard University
- Thesis: The Making of the Modern City: The Development of Jamaica Plain, Massachusetts, 1632-1920 (1986)

Alexander Carl von Hoffman (born July 11, 1951, in United States) is an American urban planner and historian. He is currently Lecturer in Urban Planning and Design at the Harvard University Graduate School of Design and Senior Research Fellow at Harvard's Joint Center for Housing Studies. He is a specialist on the history and policy of housing, particularly of low-income housing policy in the United States.

== Career ==
Von Hoffman was born to Ann Cremin Byrne, daughter of the architect Barry Byrne who apprenticed with Frank Lloyd Wright, and Nicholas von Hoffman, a descendant of Carl von Hoffman and Melchior Hoffman. Von Hoffman received a Bachelor of Arts in English (1977), where he was honored as summa cum laude, and a Master of Arts in History (1979) from the University of Massachusetts, Boston. He then received a Master of Arts (1980) and a doctorate (1986) in History from Harvard University. His dissertation focused on the development of Jamaica Plain. Upon graduating, he was named assistant professor of urban planning at Harvard's Graduate School of Design. In 1990, von Hoffman was promoted to the level of associate professor, a post which he held until 1995.

In 1998, von Hoffman joined Harvard's Joint Center for Housing Studies as senior fellow. From that point until present, he has also been a lecturer in urban planning and design at the Graduate School of Design.

From 1995 to 2002, von Hoffman served on the board of directors of The Bostonian Society, and since 2004, he has served on the board of directors of the Journal of Urban History.

== Selected works ==
- Local Attachments: The Making of an American Urban Neighborhood, 1850 to 1920, Johns Hopkins University Press, 1994
- House by House, Block by Block: The Rebirth of America's Urban Neighborhoods, Oxford University Press, 2003
