= Sue Schurman =

American scholar

- Occupation: Scholar

Academic background
- Education: University of Michigan (PhD)

Sue Schurman is an American scholar, currently distinguished professor at Rutgers School of Management and Labor Relations and dean from 2011 to 2015.

== Education ==
Schurman earned her PhD from University of Michigan.

== Career ==
In 1997, Schurman became the founding president of National Labor College. In 2011, Schurman became the dean of Rutgers School of Management and Labor Relations.
