= Alan Miller (journalist) =

American journalist

Alan C. Miller
- Born: March 5, 1954 (age 72)
- Education: Wesleyan University, University of Hawaii at Manoa
- Employer: News Literacy Project
- Title: Founder (retired as CEO in 2022)
- Awards: 2003 Pulitzer Prize for National Reporting
- Website: newslit.org

Alan C. Miller (born March 5, 1954) is a Pulitzer Prize-winning American journalist and the founder of the News Literacy Project, a national education nonprofit that works with educators and journalists to offer resources and tools that help middle school and high school students learn to separate fact from fiction. In 2020, NLP expanded its audience to include people of all ages.

== Early life ==
Born in New York City to Martin and Anita Miller, Miller was raised in Ridgewood, New Jersey. In 1976, he received a bachelor's degree in English from Wesleyan University, where he was a member of Phi Beta Kappa. Wesleyan considers him one of its "notable alumni." He received a master's degree in political science in 1978 from the University of Hawaii and was a student participant at the East-West Center's Communication Institute. During his post-graduate studies he was an intern in the Tokyo bureau of The Washington Post.

== Career ==
Miller was a reporter for The Times Union in Albany, New York, and The Record in Hackensack, New Jersey, before joining the Los Angeles Times in 1987. Seven years later he became a member of the Times' investigative team in Washington. During his career, he received more than a dozen national journalism awards, including for reports on illegal foreign contributions to Democratic candidates (the 1996 George Polk Award, the 1997 National Headliner Award for Investigative Reporting and the 1997 Goldsmith Prize for Investigative Reporting) and for "The Vertical Vision," a series, written with Kevin Sack, about the dangers of the Marine Corps' McDonnell Douglas AV-8B Harrier II jet (the 2002 Investigative Reporters and Editors Medal, the 2003 Pulitzer Prize for National Reporting and the 2003 Associated Press Managing Editors Association Public Service Award).

In 2006, he was invited to tell the sixth-grade classes at his daughter's school in Bethesda, Maryland, about his work as a journalist. The 175 thank-you notes he received led him to consider the impact that journalists could have in the classroom. Two years later he left the Times and founded the News Literacy Project.

Miller has served on the advisory board of Stony Brook University's Center for News Literacy and the board of the American Society of News Editors. He was a fellow at the Japan Society in 1998 and the Peter Jennings Project at the National Constitution Center in 2008. He has spoken at a number of colleges and universities and has appeared on panels sponsored by Columbia Journalism School, the Knight Commission on the Information Needs of Communities in a Democracy, Investigative Reporters and Editors, the International Center for Journalists, the National Endowment for Democracy, and Harvard University's Shorenstein Center on the Press, Politics and Public Policy. In October 2024, as part of the Public Affairs Lecture Series at Fairleigh Dickinson University, he delivered a speech on “The Search for Truth in an Era of False News.”

Washingtonian magazine named him a Washingtonian of the Year in December 2020. In October 2021 he was named one of five recipients of the 2022 AARP Purpose Prize, awarded to people age 50 and older "who use their knowledge and life experience to solve challenging social problems." The East-West Center presented him with its Distinguished Alumni Award in June 2022; in June 2024, during the center's International Media Conference, he received its award for Journalists of Courage and Impact, which "recognizes the contributions of exceptional journalists from across the Asia-Pacific region." The global cross-sector collaboration platform Ideagen named him a 2023 Power Innovator, and he was interviewed by George Sifakis, Ideagen's founder and CEO, as part of the organization's 2023 Global Innovation Summit, an online event that began streaming in March 2023. In September 2024 he and three other graduates of Ridgewood (N.J.) High School were named Distinguished Alumni by the RHS Alumni Association; the honor "recognize[s] the achievements of alumni who have made significant contributions to society through their personal lives, individual passions, talents, professional accomplishments, and/or community service." In May 2026, at a ceremony during Miller's 50th college reunion, the Wesleyan University Alumni Association presented him with the James R. McConaughy Jr. Memorial Award, which "recognizes a member of the Wesleyan family ... whose writing or other creative achievement conveys unusual insight and understanding of current and past events."

Miller retired as CEO of the News Literacy Project on June 30, 2022.

== Journalism awards ==
- 1981 New York State Publishers State Government Coverage Award of Excellence
- 1996 George Polk Award for Political Reporting, Los Angeles Times, "Money From Asia"
- 1997 National Headliner Award for Investigative Reporting, Los Angeles Times, "Money From Asia"
- 1997 Goldsmith Prize for Investigative Reporting, Los Angeles Times, "Illegal Democratic Campaign Contributions"
- 2002 Investigative Reporters and Editors Medal, "The Vertical Vision"
- 2003 Pulitzer Prize for National Reporting, "The Vertical Vision"
- 2003 Associated Press Managing Editors Association Public Service Award
- 2005 (second place) John B. Oakes Award for Distinguished Environmental Journalism, "Environmental Politics"
- 2008 National Press Club Consumer Journalism Award, "Danger in Tow"
- 2008 National Headliner Award for Investigative Reporting (third place), "Danger in Tow"
