= Media Literacy Now =

Nonprofit organization in the US

Media Literacy Now (MLN) is a nonprofit company that "teaches students to apply critical thinking to media messages, and to use media to create their own messages." They advocate for this through "public awareness campaigns, policymaker education, coalition-building, and influencing regulations and legislation." MLN was founded in 2013 by Erin McNeill, a journalist based in Massachusetts.

As of 2021, MLN had 13 chapters in the U.S. and successfully advocated for 15 pieces of passed legislation in eight states. The legislation was focused on setting up school programs for media literacy. The states that passed the legislation include Connecticut, Illinois, Rhode Island, and Washington.

States with an active local chapters include New Jersey, and Rhode Island.

== See also ==
- News Literacy Project
