= Institute for Women's Leadership at Rutgers University =

- Formation: 1991
- Founder: Mary S. Hartman
- Location: 162 Ryders Lane New Brunswick, NJ 08901
- Leader: Meghan Rehbein, Director
- Website: iwl.rutgers.edu

The Institute for Women's Leadership (IWL) at Rutgers University is a consortium based at the Rutgers-New Brunswick campus. This structure is exemplary in its ability to work collaboratively and enable units to speak and act collectively. The consortium values feminist perspectives, evidence based-research, intersectional analysis, inclusion and community. The programs, research, and the collective work of the IWL consortium position Rutgers University-New Brunswick as a premier site for deepening research and expanding opportunities to develop women’s leadership for social change.

The Institute for Women's Leadership was established in 1991 by Mary S. Hartman, former Dean of Douglass Residential College. Alison R. Bernstein was appointed director in July, 2011 and served and served a five year term until her death on June 30, 2016. Lisa Hetfield, longtime associate director and director of development) served as interim director beginning in July, 2016 and remained in that role until Rebecca Mark was appointed director in January, 2020. Meghan Rehbeinbegan her tenure a s director in July 2025. Rehbein brings significant expertise in strategic planning and organizational development to this role, which she is undertaking while continuing to serve as the eleventh Dean of Douglass, a position she has held since July 2022.

IWL leads activities in three broad areas: Model leadership programs for women in the public and private sectors, interdisciplinary research on women's leadership, and collaborative programs that utilize the experience of unit members for the benefit of the consortium.

== Research and publications ==
The Institute for Women's Leadership conducts research on women's leadership and lives. The IWL disseminates its findings through books, reports, transcripts, and documentaries about women leaders, as well as fact sheets and data on the status of women in New Jersey, the United States, and the world. The goal is to encourage the interdisciplinary examination of leadership in the different contexts of science, technology, politics and public policy, the arts, business, law, the humanities, higher education, and the global arena, while considering perspectives of gender, race, ethnicity, and age in exercising leadership.

Notable publications include:

- Junctures in Women's Leadership: Media and Journalism edited by Linda Steiner (New Brunswick, NJ: Rutgers University Press, 2025).
- Junctures in Women's Leadership: Health Care and Public Health edited by Mary E. O'Dowd and Ruth Charbonneau (New Brunswick, NJ: Rutgers University Press, 2021).
- Junctures in Women's Leadership: Higher Education edited by Carmen Twillie Ambar, Carol T. Christ, and Michele Ozumba (New Brunswick, NJ: Rutgers University Press, 2020).
- Junctures in Women’s Leadership: The Arts written by Judith K. Brodsky and Ferris Olin (New Brunswick, NJ: Rutgers University Press, 2018).
- Junctures in Women's Leadership: Social Movements edited by Mary K. Trigg and Alison R. Bernstein (New Brunswick, NJ: Rutgers University Press, 2016).
- Junctures in Women's Leadership: Business edited by Lisa Hetfield and Dana Britton (New Brunswick, NJ: Rutgers University Press, 2016)
- Leading the Way: Young Women's Activism for Social Change edited by Mary K. Trigg, with a preface by Mary Hartman (New Brunswick, NJ: Rutgers University Press, 2010).
- Doing Diversity in Higher Education: Faculty Leaders Share Challenges and Strategies edited by Winnifred R. Brown-Galude (New Brunswick, NJ: Rutgers University Press, 2008).
- Talking Leadership: Conversations with Powerful Women edited by Mary Hartman (New Brunswick, NJ: Rutgers University Press, 1999).
- National Dialogue on Educating Women Leaders

== History ==
Launching the Institute for Women's Leadership Consortium in the late 1980s, Mary S. Hartman, then Dean of Douglass College, began to meet informally with the directors of the women's programs and centers located on the Douglass campus. These gatherings became a forum for working collaboratively to develop and strengthen women's education at Rutgers, as well as to consider the critical underrepresentation of women in leadership in all arenas at the local, national, and international levels. Under Mary Hartman's leadership in 1991, the directors formed a consortium to address this underrepresentation. Declaring the mission of the Institute as “dedicated to examining issues of leadership and advancing women’s leadership in education, research, politics, the workplace, and the world,” the founding directors established the Institute as a collaborative enterprise, the nation's first consortium dedicated to women's lives and leadership.

The founding directors of the new Institute for Women's Leadership were:

- Mary S. Hartman, Dean of Douglass College
- Alice Kessler-Harris, Director, Women's Studies Program
- Charlotte Bunch, Director, Center for Women's Global Leadership
- Carol Smith, Director, Institute for Research on Women
- Ruth B. Mandel, Director until 2019, Center for American Women and Politics, Eagleton Institute of Politics.

Shortly after its founding, the Institute added the new Center for Women and Work, directed by Dorothy Sue Cobble at the Rutgers School of Management and Labor Relations (1993). In 2007, under Judith Brodsky and Ferris Olin’s leadership, the Institute for Women and Art (now the Center for Women in the Arts at Douglass) joined the consortium. The Office for the Promotion of Women in Science, Engineering and Mathematics (2008-2019), under the direction of Vice President Joan Bennett, became the next member unit. In 2011, the Center on Violence Against Women and Children (now Center for Research on Ending Violence, School of Social Work) founded by Judy Postmus, joined the consortium. In October 2020, the consortium welcomed the Center for Women in Business, Rutgers Business School, directed by Lisa Kaplowitz. The Women's Health Institute, Robert Wood Johnson Medical School, led by co-directors Gloria A. Bachmann, MD, MMS, and Juana Hutchinson-Colas, MD, MBA, joined in 2025.
