= Nicholas von Hoffman =

American journalist (1929–2018)

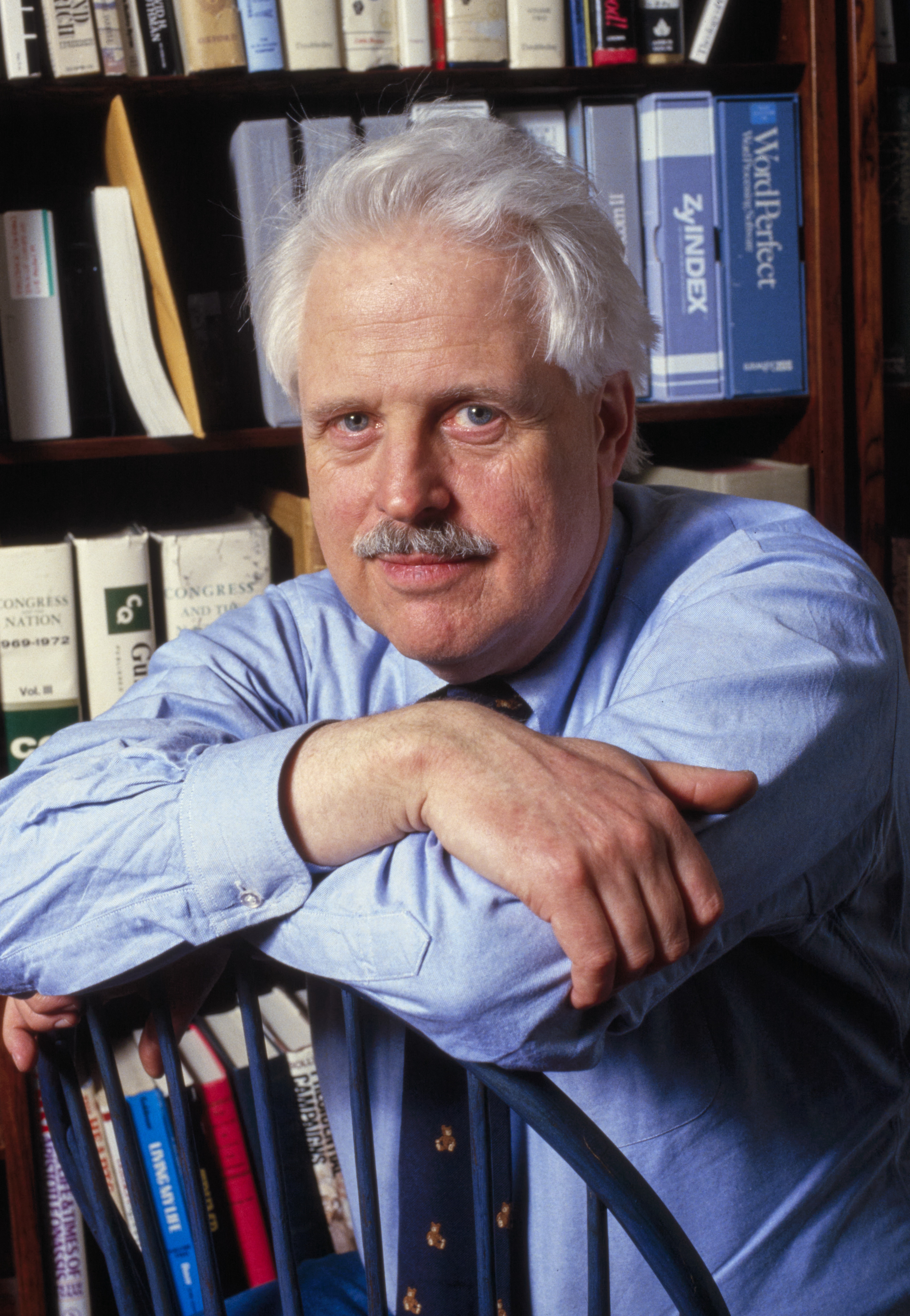
- von Hoffman in c. 1987–1988
- Born: Nicholas von Hoffman; October 16, 1929; New York City, U.S.
- Died: February 1, 2018 (aged 88); Rockport, Maine, U.S.
- Occupation: Journalist
- Known for: 60 Minutes Point/Counterpoint
- Children: 3, including Alexander

Nicholas von Hoffman (October 16, 1929 – February 1, 2018) was an American journalist and author. He first worked as a community organizer for Saul Alinsky in Chicago for ten years from 1953 to 1963. Later, Von Hoffman wrote for The Washington Post, and most notably, was a commentator on the CBS Point-Counterpoint segment for 60 Minutes, from which Don Hewitt fired him in 1974. von Hoffman was also a columnist for The Huffington Post.

== Life and career ==
A native New Yorker of German and Russian descent, von Hoffman was born to Anna L. Bruenn, a dentist, and Carl von Hoffman, an explorer and adventurer. Von Hoffman never attended college. In the 1950s, he worked on the research staff of the Industrial Relations Center of the University of Chicago, and then for Saul Alinsky as a field representative of the Industrial Areas Foundation in Chicago, where his best known role was as lead organizer for The Woodlawn Organization.

Ben Bradlee, former editor of The Washington Post, hired von Hoffman from the Chicago Daily News. While at the Post, he wrote a column for the paper's Style section. In her memoirs, Katharine Graham, then the newspaper's publisher, wrote of him: "My life would have been a lot simpler had Nicholas von Hoffman not appeared in the paper." She added that "I firmly believed that he belonged at the Post".

Beginning in 1979 and continuing through the 1980s, von Hoffman recorded over two-hundred radio commentaries, audio op-eds in the sardonic style he used on 60 Minutes. These commentaries were broadcast on the nationally syndicated daily radio program, Byline, which was sponsored by the Cato Institute. Subjects of von Hoffman's audio op-eds included the 1984 Democratic primary candidates, the Reagan administration's foreign policy in Central America and the Middle East, and the cynical, self-serving misuse of language by politicians.

Von Hoffman wrote more than a dozen books, notably: Capitalist Fools: Tales of American Business, from Carnegie to Forbes to the Milken Gang (1992), Citizen Cohn (1988), a biography of Roy Cohn, which was made into an HBO movie, and Hoax: Why Americans Are Suckered by White House Lies (2004). Von Hoffman also wrote a libretto for Deborah Drattell's Nicholas and Alexandra for the Los Angeles Opera which was performed in the 2003–2004 season under the direction of Plácido Domingo. Between April 2007 and February 2008, starting with an article about soaking the rich to pay for George W. Bush's Iraq War, he was a columnist for the New York Observer.

Von Hoffman was fired by Don Hewitt for referring to President Richard Nixon, at the height of the Watergate scandal, as "the dead mouse on the kitchen floor of America, and the only question now is who's going to pick him up by his tail and throw him in the garbage." His collaborations, both literary and otherwise, with Doonesbury cartoonist Garry Trudeau are worth noting, in particular the 1976 book Tales From the Margaret Mead Taproom. In this book, he recounted his adventures in American Samoa with Trudeau and actress Elizabeth Ashley, as they and several others experienced life in the American territory, which Trudeau had lampooned in a series of Doonesbury strips involving Uncle Duke's adventures as the territory's appointed governor. He also wrote for the Architectural Digest.

Von Hoffman died on February 1, 2018, and was survived by three sons: Alexander von Hoffman, a noted historian; Aristodemos, who works in intelligence; and Constantine, also a journalist.

== Works ==
(partial list)

- Mississippi Notebook. 1964.
- The Multiversity: A Personal Report on What Happens to Today's Students at American Universities. 1966.
- We Are the People Our Parents Warned Us Against. 1969.
- Two, Three, Many More: A Novel. 1969.
- Left at the Post. 1970.
- Trout Fishing in the Reflecting Pool Or the Fireside Watergate. 1973. With Garry Trudeau.
- Make-Believe Presidents: Illusions of Power from McKinley to Carter. 1978.
- Organized Crimes: A Novel. 1984.
- Citizen Cohn (Doubleday, 1988)
- Capitalist Fools: Tales of American Business, from Carnegie to Forbes to the Milken Gang. 1992.
- Hoax: Why Americans Are Suckered by White House Lies. 2004.
- Geneva (play)
- A Devil's Dictionary of Business. 2005.
- Radical: A Portrait of Saul Alinsky (Nation Books, 2010)

== In popular culture ==
In 1988, fictional presidential candidate Jack Tanner named von Hoffman as his pick for Chairman of the Federal Reserve Board in Robert Altman's HBO series Tanner '88.
