= Dorothy Sue Cobble =

American historian

- Born: 1949 (age 76–77); Atlanta, Georgia
- Occupation: Professor

Academic background
- Education: University of California, Berkeley (B.A.); Stanford University(M.A., Ph.D.)

Academic work
- Discipline: History, Labor Studies
- Notable works: The Other Women’s Movement (2005)

Dorothy Sue Cobble (June 28, 1949) is an American historian, and a specialist in the historical study of work, social movements, and feminism in the United States and worldwide. She is a Distinguished Professor Emerita at Rutgers University, and has held dual appointments in the Departments of Labor Studies and History since 1986.

Her book The Other Women’s Movement (2005) coined the term labor feminism.

== Early life and education ==
Cobble was born in Atlanta, Georgia in 1949, into a working class family. She attended Smith College before receiving her B.A. from the University of California, Berkeley in 1972.

She worked as a trade union stevedore in the mid-1970s before earning her Ph.D. in history from Stanford University in 1986. At Stanford, she studied under American historian and Pulitzer Prize-winning author Carl Degler.

== Career ==
During the 1970s and 1980s, Cobble became a leading historian of women's labor movements. She was the first woman to run the Labor Studies program at City College of San Francisco, and after receiving her PhD, joined the faculty of Rutgers University, where she initially led education for women trade unionists in New Jersey and created the Center for Women and Work.

She has held joint posts in the Departments of Labor Studies and History since 1986 and was named a Distinguished Professor in 2009.

Cobble's first book Dishing It Out: Waitresses and Their Unions in the Twentieth Century (1991) was among the earliest studies of unionism and the service sector.

Her second book, The Other Women's Movement: Workplace Justice and Social Rights in America (2005) is a political and intellectual history of women’s contributions to reforming the workplace. The book coined the term labor feminism to describe a women's movement in the United States that emerged in the 1920s and focused on gaining rights in the workplace and unions. It received the 2005 Philip Taft Book Prize from Cornell University for the best book in American labor history.

She edited several books on women and work, including Women and Unions: Forging a Partnership in 1993 and The Sex of Class: Women Transforming American Labor in 2007.

Cobble's subsequent books focused the transnational feminist movement. She coauthored Feminism Unfinished: A Short, Surprising History of American Women’s Movements with Linda Gordon and Astrid Henry, which detailed a century of feminist activism across lines of class and race. In 2021, she published For the Many: American Feminists and the Global Fight for Democratic Equality, a history of the twentieth-century feminists who fought for the rights of women and workers internationally.

Cobble retired in 2021 as a Distinguished Professor Emerita in Labor Studies and Employment Relations.

=== Books ===
- Dishing It Out: Waitresses and Their Unions in the Twentieth Century (1991)
- Women and Unions: Forging a Partnership (editor) (1993)
- The Other Women's Movement: Workplace Justice and Social Rights in America (2005)
- The Sex of Class: Women Transforming American Labor (editor) (2007)
- Feminism Unfinished: A Short, Surprising History of American Women’s Movements with Linda Gordon and Astrid Henry (2014)
- For the Many: American Feminists and the Global Fight for Democratic Equality (2021)
