= Carl von Hoffman =

Baltic-German soldier and adventurer

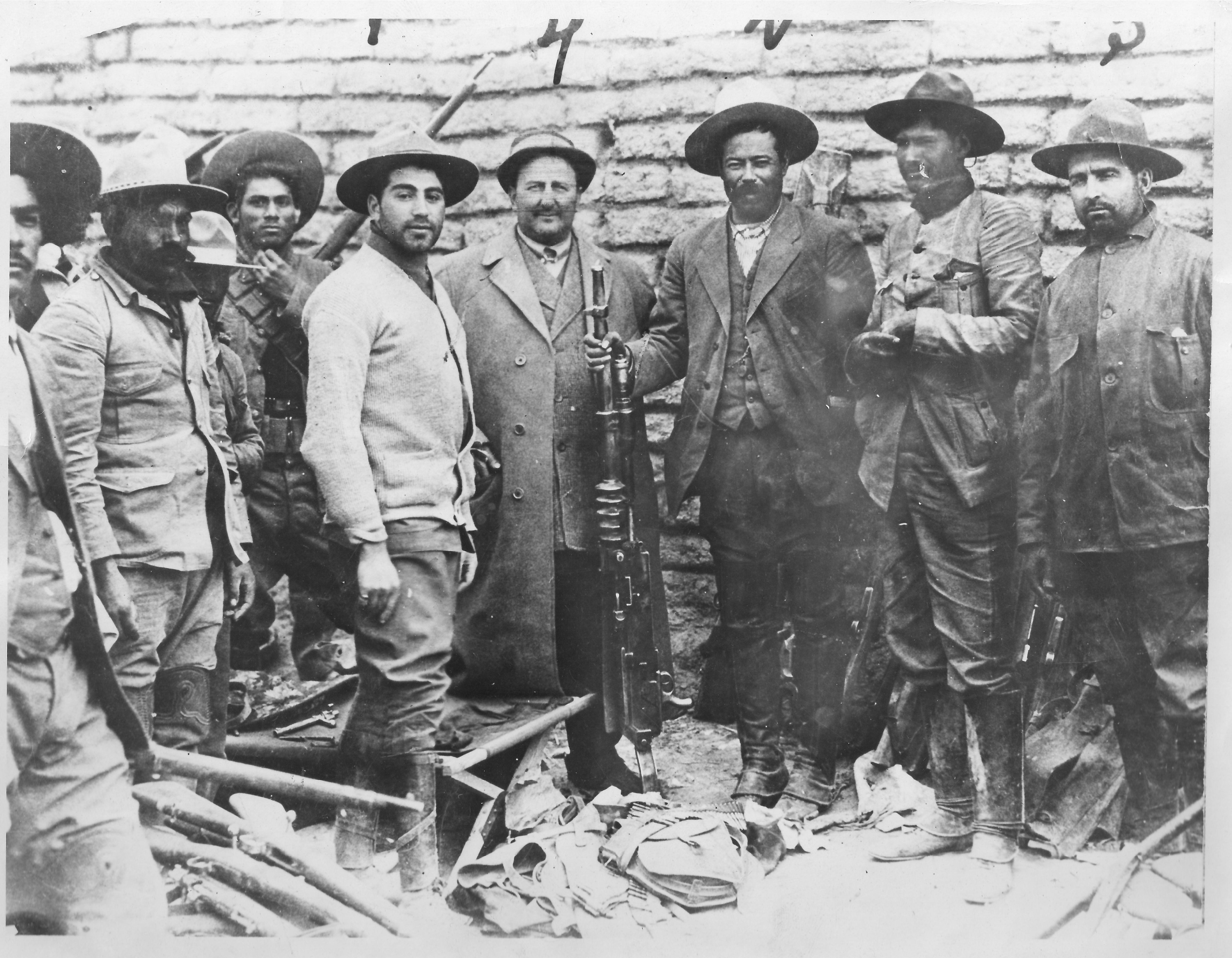
- Carl von Hoffman (Center) and Pancho Villa. Von Hoffman was on assignment from D. W. Griffith to gather films of Pancho Villa. For this, Villa was to be paid $25,000.
- Born: 1899; St. Petersburg, Russia
- Died: July 8, 1982 (aged 82–83); New York City, U.S.
- Occupations: Explorer; soldier
- Children: Nicholas von Hoffman

Carl von Hoffman (c. 1889 – 8 July 1982) was a soldier, adventurer, author, and photographer of German ancestry. He was possibly a descendant of Melchior Hoffman; journalist Nicholas von Hoffman is his son.

In 1905 or 1906, von Hoffman—then a military cadet—disobeyed his mother's wishes and joined the Russian army during the Russo-Japanese War. For actions during the war he was awarded the Order of St. Anna. He participated in World War I, serving in the Russian army, and then under Admiral Kolchak on the White Russian side in the Russian Civil War. Von Hoffman claimed to have been on the Roosevelt-Rondon Scientific Expedition in 1913.

Von Hoffman was an explorer who once led a safari from Cape Town, South Africa, to Cairo—a walk that took him three years and was the basis of his two books, Jungle Gods (New York, H. Holt and Company [c1929]) and Jerry on Safari: A 7,000 Mile Journey from Cairo to the Cape (Philadelphia: J. B. Lippincott Company, 1936). Von Hoffman's photographs of the Mexican Revolution and of Theodore Roosevelt were celebrated; his photographs of Roosevelt and Pancho Villa were exhibited in 2002 at the Martin & Osa Johnson Safari Museum. He was the cinematographer for films including The Life of General Villa, (1914,), featuring Pancho Villa himself. The movie was produced by D. W. Griffith. Von Hoffman often said his knowledge of the use of machine guns was one of the things Griffiths offered Villa to gain his participation in the movie. (In 2003, the filming of the documentary about Villa was turned into a TV movie, And Starring Pancho Villa as Himself, directed by Bruce Beresford and written by Larry Gelbart with the minor role of von Hoffman played by Julian Sedgwick.) Von Hoffman was also cinematographer of The Marriage Bond (1916) directed by Lawrence Marston. He was a member of the Explorers Club. He was also an Honorary Life Member and past president (1962) of the Adventurers' Club of New York.

== Early life ==
Von Hoffman was born in the Baltic port city of Riga on February 13, 1890, where his father was engaged as a botanist and forester of the then vast timber holdings of the Czar. Family position enabled young Carl to enter the Third Military Academy in St. Petersburg. It was also this family position and acquaintance with many of the ship's captains plying between this port and England with their cargoes of lumber that secured for Carl an invitation to sail to England which he eagerly accepted after securing leave from the academy and having reached the age of 17.

While aboard ship in Liverpool, he developed an interest and engaged in conversations about the great ships berthed nearby that were to sail to the United States. The captain offered to arrange a free passage to New York and this opportunity was also accepted by the adventurous Carl. Having no money, he was able to borrow $300 from the captain and set sail at once for America.

== Arrival in New York ==
Upon arrival in New York, he briefly explored the city and shortly decided not to return but to remain in the United States. It was fortunate that a German family who had once lived on their property and had immigrated earlier were now in New York, and there he stayed. All of this activity was not easily cast aside by his family who attempted to exert pressure on him to return by way of the then American Ambassador known to the family. Having no knowledge of the English language, he secured a correspondence course in an attempt to learn and which, though difficult, began his mastery of the language.

Being low in funds, he accepted work in what could now be referred to as a sweatshop where men's shirts were manufactured, and almost all of the workers spoke Russian. The work was to unroll material on near block-long benches and prepare it for the cutters. During all of this time, his family continued efforts to secure his return by contact with the Russian Ambassador—all to no avail. His decision had been made.

== Photography apprenticeship ==
As the result of his amateur knowledge and interest in photography, he was fortunate to be able to secure an apprenticeship with Brown Brothers, a photographic company. At this time in our history, it was common for newspapers to give photo assignments to an independent company to complete for them. After serving an apprenticeship with Brown Brothers, he learned that the New York Globe wanted to have their own staff photographer. As the Globe was aware of some of the outstanding work he had done with Brown Brothers, he was offered the job. The year was 1910. The job, press photographer. One of his early tasks while with The Globe, was to establish a darkroom, as the photographers of that era had to do all of their own lab work. He continued to secure outstanding news photographs but was still handicapped by the language barrier, as it was also required at that time that the photographer provide captions for their work, Fortunately a noted cartoonist named Walter Davenport became friendly with the young photographer and assisted him developing the titles.

This same employer, the Globe, late in 1910, provided additional opportunity for adventure when the editor advised him he was to be assigned overseas to cover a story in the then virtually unheard of city of Timbuktu. Carl, not being sure if this was a practical joke or not, went at once to his cartoonist friend Davenport and told him the good news. It was then he learned that Timbuktu was in the grips of the bubonic plague and no one else would accept the assignment. He set sail with a group of Catholic missionaries assigned to provide medical aid. The group sailed first to England and then to Africa's west coast. The final leg of the trip overland was completed by camel caravan.

The assignment was to record on film the work of the missionaries and the burning of the huts and possessions of those who had fallen victim to the plague. They attempted to minimize the possibility of becoming victims themselves by staying out of the huts and observing the best sanitary methods they could muster, there being no protection known at the time except the torch.

Upon his return to The Globe from the Timbuktu assignment, the paper moved to new quarters and Carl made contact with a company that was to provide him with the opportunity to learn the art of moviemaking. This opportunity provided the basics to launch him on a decades-long career as a pioneer in the art of making documentary films.

== Mutual Film Company ==
While employed by Mutual Film, Carl was chosen to accompany the Teddy Roosevelt ill-fated expedition on the River of Doubt in the Brazilian jungle. Upon arrival at the last deep forest jumping-off spot, it was learned that inadequate provision had been made to transport anyone but Colonel Roosevelt, Kermit Roosevelt, and an army general, along with their personal photographer, leaving Carl to return to the main base with the film taken up to that point. Later it was learned that as the expedition was returning down river, an overburdened canoe swamped and all the film taken was lost. The only photo record of the expedition was safely in Carl's camera.

From this activity, Carl received an assignment from D. W. Griffith to gather factual films of Pancho Villa for use in a film. For this, Poncho Villa was to be paid $25,000. This would permit Carl to travel with him to various camps and film their activity. The plans were for a one-year project, but this was cut short after about nine months when Carl became privy to the information that the go-between had pocketed $10,000 and misinformed Poncho as to the amount paid. It was learned that there was a plan afoot to have a rifleman stationed on a hillside shoot Carl while he was operating his camera, thereby eliminating the threat of his revealing this information to Poncho with whom Carl had developed a friendship and closeness. At this point in history, there were a number of persons who had the technical and mechanical knowledge of the equipment, but they were not photographers. The artistic approach was missing, such as the use of close-ups and varied camera angles. Having learned the basics, Carl applied to an independent firm for a job as a cameraman and after testing his work was given the assignment to cover the Wilson inauguration though he was still on the staff of The Globe. It was during this assignment, through friends in Washington, that he was able to photograph Mr. Taft on his last visit to church as the president was removing his hat. This had never been photographed before, as Taft expressly forbade such photos. The coverage of the inaugural parade was viewed at the ground level where he could photograph the crowd reactions, children on the curb, and vendors selling their wares, as well as the procession. This gave a human, artistic touch not heretofore found in news films---the first human interest introduced to these films.

== Assignments in the East ==
On the basis of the exceptional quality and technique displayed, he was given a full-time staff position by Universal. The first assignment from this company was to take the first motion pictures of the United States fleet on maneuvers.

A number of years later, while on a lecture tour of Japan, von Hoffman came upon the idea of visiting Taiwan, which was then called Formosa and under Japanese control, and had wild areas not heretofore explored or photographed. Entry was not encouraged by the government, and in fact no foreigners were permitted. This made it all the more appealing to him, and by trickery he secured a ticket for passage on a government boat, with professors en route there to service the small educational system the Japanese maintained on the island. His exploration of this region permitted him to record on film some of the rites of the tribes of headhunters still living in the remote mountain areas. This seven-month effort produced a remarkable film shown at the Explorers Club. The visit also permitted him to secure a collection of treasured artifacts relating to the lives of these people and produced a lecture series on the subject.

Earlier, with his technique improving, Carl decided to make an independent film which was an anthropological and ethnological documentary on Morocco entitled "Land of the Moors" which was later featured at the Strand Theater in New York. This effort was the beginning of his deep involvement as a pioneer of documentary and educational films of primitive people, their land, and customs. These films were produced by the Urban Institute, which Carl joined, headed by Sir Charles Urban, and it was this company that expanded the use of documentary films and later its own motion picture color process.

This visit produced a number of interesting encounters, among them being the guest of the Pasha for a dinner consisting of endless courses eaten with fingers instead of utensils. It. was after such a dinner, when the many wives of the host were gathered, that the Pasha revealed that one of the guests was originally from Russia and had a Georgian mother. This was, of course, particularly interesting to the gathering, as it was common at that time for them to buy their wives in Georgia and transport them home for the wedding ceremony on the backs of small desert donkeys, a long trip by any standard.

Shortly after this encounter, a small messenger delivered a note to Carl on the back of some wrapping paper. He was requested, in Russian, to follow the young boy, who would call for him the next morning, and subsequently meet the mystery author of the note. The following day, he did as asked, and was taken to a small hut in the village where he was instructed to remove his western-style clothing in exchange for a flowing caftan, veil, and special sandals. The footwear was of special significance to Carl as each pair bore the family identification in Arabic and he had no idea just which family name he bore. Having donned the perfect disguise, and being assured in sign language that his effects would be safe, the boy beckoned him to follow. They followed a circuitous route, finally arriving at one of the entrances to the home of the Pasha. The boy had access to the area and they walked past Arabs sitting along the passageways who did not give them a second glance. They shortly arrived at the servants' entrance, passed through, and entered the main building complex. The area had many smaller buildings and areas which were occupied by the many wives, each having her own apartment and servants. The servants were devoted to the wife they served and conspiracies against husbands were carried out with their assistance. Finally, after being settled in one of these apartments by the servants, the lady of the house appeared and addressed him in Russian. She went on to explain that her husband, the host of the previous evening's dinner, had told her about Carl and his Russian background and the fact that his mother was a Georgian from a prominent family which she recognized. It was upon hearing this that she decided she must see him and began the plot to smuggle him into the harem area. The family where the costume change occurred were the parents of one of her house servants and also loyal. Carl had managed to conceal a camera within his flowing robes and was able to take one photo of the three women sitting in the apartment while visiting. He was then told the story of the Georgian wife being sold to her husband and her donkey caravan trip to her current home in the harem. At a later date, he made a second visit, though to be exposed would have meant beheading. The film, when completed, was not only one of the prominent achievements in the making of documentary films, but provided the subject matter for a series of lectures within the United States and Europe.

A little known fact was that a considerable amount of footage was taken with cameraman Von Hoffman looking toward the' rear of the camera. By religious custom, the Moroccans frowned upon reproducing their image on film, and would hide. To overcome this, Carl devised a mirror on the camera to enable him to look backwards, quieting any suspicions the populace had that they were being photographed. Furthermore, it caused many to follow his backward gaze, thereby looking directly into the camera, producing some outstanding footage.

== Trek in Africa ==
During 1924, Carl was approached by a group of four businessmen from Detroit and invited to participate in an African trek from Cairo to Cape Town completely on foot, a distance of slightly over 7,000 miles, ultimately taking 11 months to complete. This was the longest trek in the history of exploration. The group, which consisted of a doctor, realtor, lawyer, and the inventor of the Packard 12-cylinder automobile, felt the need of a professional explorer, hence Carl's participation. The purpose of the trip was the sheer accomplishment of the act for all except Carl who wanted the films that such a trip could generate.

The group sailed from New York to England shortly before Christmas in 1924. Upon arrival in England, they separated with three of the group going to Paris. Carl and the doctor remained behind to secure medical information relative to protection from tropical diseases. They experienced much difficulty in reaching the doctor having the needed information, and had abandoned hope of making contact, when a last-minute call before leaving for the airport found him in his office. A forgotten Christmas gift had caused the doctor to return to his Office at the moment of their last telephone attempt. This contact caused them to cancel their air passage. The flight they cancelled caught fire in air and crashed en route with the loss of all aboard. This minor change in plans was unknown to the remainder of the group in Paris, who believing them lost, were cancelling plans to complete the expedition. Their arrival was quite a shock to the others the next morning.

The trek followed a relatively direct course with large numbers of porters engaged to move the supplies south. The porters carried only to their territorial borders. Fortunately, contacts with Colonial commissioners gave them the opportunity to have the needed manpower available at each border. Porters carried 50 pounds each on their heads and were paid in salt and calico cloth. As supplies diminished, less porters were required. While traveling in the areas having a heavy infestation of malaria, they traveled at night, as the mosquitoes and tsetse flies were not as active during this period. The only problem with this hiking technique was that while the insects slept, the leopard and lion became active.

It was not uncommon for a tribal commissioner to travel part of the distance with the safari as a show of good will. This gesture and lack of vigilance caused one commissioner to be badly mauled by a lion that pulled him from his horse and dragged him into the bush. His head was held so tightly to the animal's body he could hear the lion's heart beat. The man's great strength enabled him to plunge a knife into the lion and kill it before being eaten. At that time, this was the only recorded case of man's survival in hand-to-hand combat with a lion.

A return visit to what was then Rhodesia provided the research data for Carl's book Jungle Gods, which was printed in several languages. The book follows the religious rites and customs of a single African tribe for a full year. It was during this period that Carl was able to spend much time with the native population and study in depth their way of life and rituals, probably never before witnessed by a white man. He is also author of Jerry on Safari, a book for young people.

== Australian Outback ==
Carl later visited the Australian Outback in an attempt to photograph the life of the Aborigines. While this produced much footage recorded for the first time, it proved extremely difficult, since the Aborigine was nomadic and with no village life at that time, only scattered glimpses were possible.

Prior to his leaving for Australia, the Bronx Zoo commissioned him to bring back a group of animals and snakes sought for display. Due to the care and planning Carl brought to the venture, none of the animals were lost on the journey home, much to the amazement of zoo officials.

The return voyage took the ship past Pitcairn Island and the captain received a telegram from the island that the people would like to see the kangaroos. As these animals were kept on deck, the ship slowed when it reached the island, and the residents paddled out in canoes to go aboard to see the kangaroos and other animals stored topside. For this gesture, Carl was presented a handsome urn carved of mahogany by the islanders.

Carl was also responsible for developing many photographic techniques and equipment. Among these was his participation in the development of the early phases of the synchro flash, which undoubtedly opened many new avenues to the photographer.

== Personal life ==
Carl often recalls the many colorful and prominent early Explorers Club members with whom he had a close relationship, such as Martin Johnson, Peter Freuchen, Lowell Thomas, Bernt Balchen, and others. As a friend of Martin Johnson, he attempted to prevail upon him to remain in New York for the Annual Dinner on the eve of Johnson's fateful flight. Unable to stay the extra day, he left and was aboard the flight that resulted in his death. Martin Johnson died in the crash of a Western Air Express Boeing 247 commercial flight near Newhall, California in 1937.

In addition to work in the fields of ethnology, anthropology and cinematology, that has seen him carry the Explorers Club flag into far-flung places and visits to primitive people, he was the founder of the club's Safari Dinners. These dinners were a popular feature of the lecture series for a long time. Some of the specialties at these dinners might be such items as: giant salmon (from Alaska); a variety of big game (provided by friends); cases of beer (from a Scandinavian source); and last, but not least, Carl's famous cream cheese and peanut butter spread dip. He also initiated many of the early annual dinners held at the Plaza, which were a great success.

His devotion to the Explorers Club as committee chairman and board member is publicly known. Over the years, his efforts and presence at Club functions and work projects have contributed much to the club and its members.

His friendship with Albert Einstein and the brother of the Dali (sic) Lama brought them to the Explorers Club to attend lectures, which events have been remembered by those members of long standing.

An in-depth conversation with Carl has been taped over a period of months. These tapes cover most of his activities, including a stint while still a cadet in the Russo-Japanese War in 1904, winning the medal of St. George for getting a vital message through the lines, and later his experience in the revolution and his miraculous recovery from typhus fever in the last days of the Russian revolution in Siberia. Carl had served as a lieutenant in the U. S. Signal Corp during World War I and after the Armistice had joined an American unit to fight in the White Army with Admiral Kolchak. These tapes are in greater detail than this account and will be made part of the Explorers Club Archives.

== Bibliography ==
- Davis, Richard Harding; et al. (1905). The Russo-Japanese war; a photographic and descriptive review of the great conflict in the Far East, gathered from the reports, records, cable despatches, photographs, etc., etc., of Collier's war correspondents. New York: P. F. Collier & Son. OCLC 21581015.
- George E. Duck, published in the Explorers Journal, Official Quarterly of the Explorers Club, Volume 60, No. 2, June 1982
