= Charlotte Bunch =

American author and activist (born 1944)

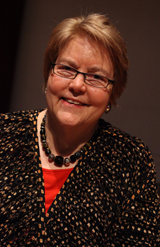
- Bunch in 2010
- Born: October 13, 1944 (age 81); North Carolina, U.S.
- Education: Duke University
- Occupation: Author
- Known for: Founding the Center for Women's Global Leadership
- Notable work: Passionate Politics: Feminist Theory in Action, Class and Feminism, Gender Violence: A Development and Human Rights Issue, Demanding Accountability: The Global Campaign and Vienna Tribunal for Women's Human Rights

Charlotte Anne Bunch (born October 13, 1944) is an American feminist author and organizer in women's rights and human rights movements. Bunch is currently the founding director and senior scholar at the Center for Women's Global Leadership at Rutgers University in New Brunswick, New Jersey. She is also a distinguished professor in the Department of Women's and Gender Studies at Rutgers.

== Biography ==
Bunch, one of four children to Charles Pardue Bunch and Marjorie Adelaide (King) Bunch, was born in West Jefferson, North Carolina, on October 13, 1944. That same year, her family moved to Artesia, New Mexico. She attended public schools in Artesia, before enrolling at Duke University in 1962.

She was a history major at Duke and graduated magna cum laude in 1966, and was involved with many groups, such as the Young Women's Christian Association and the Methodist Student Movement. Bunch has said that she participated in "pray-ins" organized by the Methodist Student Movement at Duke University, but later took a "break" from Christianity because of the homophobia within the religion.

She has been extremely active in political movements for decades and is openly lesbian. She found inspiration for being a women's and human rights activist through her family's dedication to "activism as good works."

== Career ==
Shortly after graduating from Duke University, Bunch became a youth delegate to the World Council of Churches Conference on Church and Society in Geneva, Switzerland. That same year she became president of the University Christian Movement in Washington D.C. for one year.

Following this position, Bunch became a fellow at the Institute for Policy Studies in Washington D.C., and founded Quest: A Feminist Quarterly. Bunch was a leader in the women in print movement, an effort by second-wave feminists to create alternative, autonomous communication networks created by and for women. In addition to founding Quest, Bunch helped to organize the first Women in Print Conference in 1976.

Through inspiration from Black Nationalism, Bunch took part in founding The Furies Collective, a group that published its first newspaper, The Furies, in January 1972. The goal was to give a voice to lesbian separatism. While the collective only survived for about one year, the home of the Furies Collective later was named the first lesbian-related historic landmark in Washington D.C., and became the first lesbian site on the National Register of Historic Places.

In 1977, Bunch became an associate of the Women's Institute for Freedom of the Press (WIFP). WIFP is an American nonprofit publishing organization. The organization works to increase communication between women and connect the public with forms of women-based media. She participated in or facilitated numerous international workshops and conferences, and from 1979 to 1980 she was a consultant to the secretariat for the World Conference for the United Nations Decade on Women which was hosted by WIFP.

In 1989, she founded the Center for Women's Global Leadership at Douglass College, Rutgers University, of which she remains the founding director and senior scholar. She was succeeded as executive director by Radhika Balakrishnan in September 2009.

The Center for Women's Global Leadership (CWGL) lobbied the United Nations and the international community to view women's rights as a human rights issue. CWGL is a component of the Gender Equality Architecture Reform (GEAR) Campaign, working towards the establishment of a new United Nations Gender Entity that works for equality for all of the world's women. Bunch has been a major voice for this campaign. The gender entity was finally created after four years of advocacy on July 2, 2010, and deemed UN Women.

At its 20th-anniversary symposium on March 6, 2010, following panel discussions on body, economy, and movement, CWGL organized a tribute to its founder, Charlotte Bunch, who transitioned on September 1, 2009, from her role as executive director to working with CWGL in her new capacity as founding director and senior scholar. Attendees watched a short preview of the then-upcoming documentary film Passionate Politics: The Life & Work of Charlotte Bunch (2011), directed by Tami Gold, which chronicles Bunch's lifelong personal and political commitment to women's human rights.

The Center for Women's Global Leadership launched the Charlotte Bunch Women's Human Rights Strategic Opportunities Fund in recognition of her contributions to the global women's human rights movement.

She has served on the boards of numerous organizations and is currently a member of the Advisory Committee for the Human Rights Watch Women's Rights Division, and on the boards of the Global Fund for Women and the International Council on Human Rights Policy. She has been a consultant to many United Nations bodies and recently served on the Advisory Committee for the Secretary General's 2006 Report to the General Assembly on Violence against Women. She has also voiced her support for the Campaign for the Establishment of a United Nations Parliamentary Assembly, an organisation which campaigns for democratic reform in the United Nations.

== Awards and recognition ==
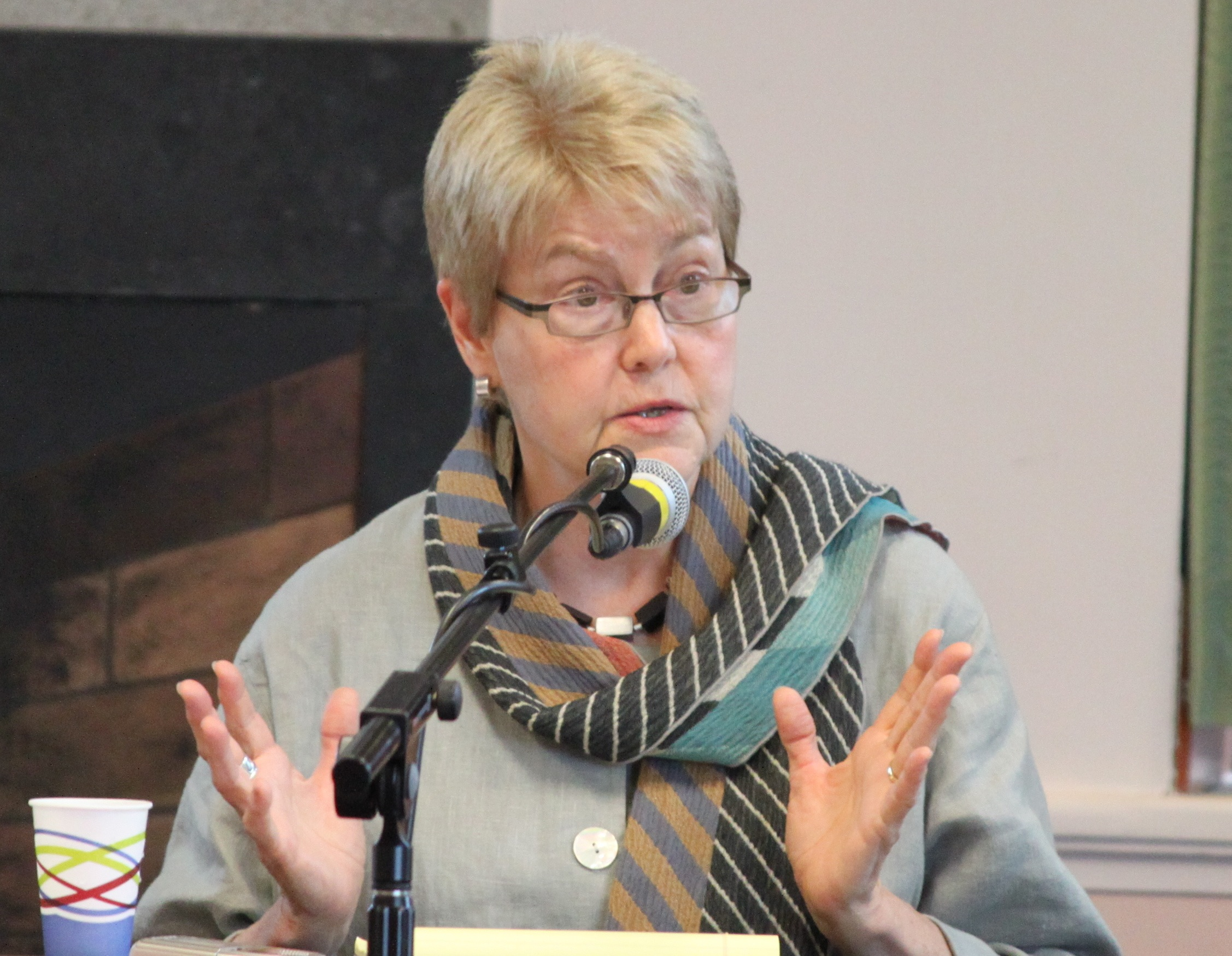
Bunch in 2011

In October 1996, Bunch was inducted into the National Women's Hall of Fame. In December 1999 she was selected by United States President Bill Clinton as a recipient of the Eleanor Roosevelt Award for Human Rights. She received the "Women Who Make a Difference Award" from the National Council for Research on Women in 2000, and was honored as one of the "21 Leaders for the 21st Century" by Women's eNews in 2002, and also received the "Board of Trustees Awards for Excellence in Research" in 2006 at Rutgers University.

- 1987: The Jessie Bernard Wise Woman Award, Center for Women Policy Studies
- 1992: Resourceful Women Award
- 1993: Feminist of the Year to the Center for Women's Global Leadership by the Feminist Majority Foundation
- 1996: Induction into the National Women's Hall of Fame
- 1997: award in recognition of its "international educational and organizing work fighting violence against women" to the Center for Women's Global Leadership by the Center for Anti-Violence Education
- 1998: The Hubert H. Humphrey Fellowship Program Recognition Award to the Center for Women's Global Leadership by the Department of Urban Planning and Policy Development, Rutgers University, The State University of New Jersey
- 1999: Church Women United Human Rights Award, Church Women United
- 1999: Eleanor Roosevelt Award for Human Rights, President William Jefferson Clinton
- 2000: Women Who Make a Difference Award, National Council for Research on Women
- 2001: Spirit of American Women Award, Girls Incorporated of Central New York
- 2002: 21 Leaders for the 21st Century, Women's Enews
- 2002: Board of Governors Distinguished Service Professor Recipient, Rutgers, The State University of New Jersey
- 2002: Women Who Make a Difference Award, International Women's Forum
- 2004: New Jersey Honorary United Nations Day Chair, appointed by the Governor of New Jersey
- 2006: Board of Trustees Award for Excellence in Research, Rutgers, The State University of New Jersey
- 2007: Honorary degree of Doctor of Laws, University of Connecticut
- 2008: Joyce Warshow Lifetime Achievement Award, SAGE (Services and Advocacy for LGBT Elders)
- 2008: Rutgers College Class of 1962 Presidential Public Service Award, Rutgers, The State University of New Jersey

== Selected works ==
Bunch has written and edited many pieces of work, which focus on women's rights and human rights. The papers of Charlotte Bunch can be found at the Arthur and Elizabeth Schlesinger Library on the History of Women in America, Radcliffe Institute.

=== Books ===
Partial list of published titles:

- A Broom of One's Own. Washington: Washington Women's Liberation. 1970. OCLC 2292078.
- Lesbianism and the Women's Movement. Baltimore, Md.: Diana Press. 1975. ISBN 978-0-884-47006-9. OCLC 1365238.
- Building Feminist Theory: Essays from QUEST, a Feminist Quarterly. New York, N.Y.: Longman. 1981. ISBN 978-0-582-28210-0. OCLC 256686819.
- Feminism in the 80's: Facing Down the Right. Denver, Colo.: Inkling Press. 1981. OCLC 9868505.
- Passionate Politics: Essays, 1968–1986: Feminist Theory in Action. New York: St. Martin's Press. 1987. ISBN 978-0-312-00667-9. OCLC 15196697.
- Transforming the Faiths of our Fathers: Women who Changed American Religion. New York: Palgrave Macmillan. 2004. ISBN 978-1403964601.
- International Feminism: Networking Against Female Sexual Slavery. Report on Global Feminist Workshop Against Traffic in Women, edited with Barry and Castley. NY: International Women's Tribune Centre, 1984. (Also published in French by Nouvelles Questions Feministes, Paris, 1985; and in Spanish by CIPAF, Santo Domingo, 1985.)

=== Articles ===
Select list of more than 250 published articles:

- "Feminism, Peace, Human Rights, and Human Security", Canadian Women's Studies/Les Cahiers de la Femme, York University, Canada, special issue on "Women and Peace-Building", Vol, 22, No. 2, 2003.
- "Women's Human Rights and Security in the Age of Terror", in Betsy Reed (ed.), Nothing Sacred: Women Respond to Religious Fundamentalism and Terror, New York: Nation Books, 2002. (Shorter version published as "Whose Security", The Nation, Vol. 275, Number 9, September 23, 2002.)
- "Human Rights at the Intersection of Race and Gender", in Rita Raj with Charlotte Bunch and elmira Nazombe (eds.), Women at the Intersection: Indivisible Rights, Identities, and Oppressions, NJ: Center for Women's Global Leadership, 2002.
- "Women's Leadership: Why Should You Care?" Power for What: National Dialogue on Educating Women for Leadership, NJ: Institute for Women's Leadership, No. 2, May, 2002.
- "Human Rights as the Foundation for a Compassionate Society", in Mahnaz Afkhami (ed.), Toward a Compassionate Society, Washington, DC: Women's Learning Partnership, 2002.
- "International Networking for Women's Human Rights", Global Citizen Action, Michael Edwards and John Gaventa (eds.), CO: Westview, 2001.
- "Women's Rights are Human Rights Post 9/11", English/ Spanish in Lola Press: International Feminist Magazine, No. 16 November 2001; (Also published in German in Leben Heist Frei Sein Dokumentation Internationaler Kongress, Berlin: Terre Des Femmes and Friedrich Ebert Stiftung, October, 2001).
