= Rutgers School of Management and Labor Relations =

Coordinates: 40.52535°N 74.43821°W

Rutgers' School of Management and Labor Relations
- Type: Public
- Established: 1947 (as the Institute of Management and Labor Relations); 1984 (as the School of Management and Labor Relations)
- Dean: Adrienne Eaton
- Academic staff: 50
- Students: 1,597
- Location: New Brunswick, New Jersey, US
- Affiliations: Rutgers, The State University of New Jersey
- Website: www.smlr.rutgers.edu

The School of Management and Labor Relations (SMLR) is an industrial relations and professional school of Rutgers University. On June 19, 1947, New Jersey Governor Alfred Driscoll signed into law legislation which formally established the Institute for Management and Labor Relations (IMLR). In 1994 the Rutgers University Board of Governors approved a resolution that restructured IMLR as the School of Management and Labor Relations (SMLR). SMLR is housed at two locations on the Cook and Livingston campuses of Rutgers–New Brunswick.

== Programs ==
Rutgers' SMLR is the major source of knowledge on the fields of work, building effective and sustainable organizations, and employment relationship. The school is divided into two departments — the Human Resource Management and the Labor Studies & Employment Relations.

== Centers and research ==
Some of the ways in which SMLR applies its expertise to help the employers and workforce of New Jersey are:

- Center for Women and Work – research and programs that promote gender equity, and a high skill economy.
- Center for Human Resource Strategy - created to advance the field of Human Resource Management by forging partnerships between HR faculty researchers and senior HR executives.
- Bio-1 – SMLR played a lead role in securing a $5.1 million grant for Central New Jersey to bring bioscience educators and industry together to build a bioscience cluster
- Rutgers Labor Management Partnership - SMLR's goal is to bring together creative minds in the New Jersey labor-management community to share ideas.
- Occupational Training and Education Consortium – houses a group of grant-funded health, safety, environmental and workforce development projects.

== Notable faculty ==
- Sue Schurman, Professor II (Labor Studies and Employment Relations) and Dean of University College Community at Rutgers, is President of the International Federation of Workers' Education Associations.
- Dorothy Sue Cobble received two awards in 2010: a fellowship from the Russell Sage Foundation, and winner of the Sol Stetin Award for Labor History.
