= Alison Bernstein =

American historian (1947–2016)

Alison Ricky Bernstein (June 8, 1947, Brooklyn – June 30, 2016) was an American historian, and program officer with the Ford Foundation. She was an expert on Native Americans, as well as an advocate for social justice, improvement of higher education and women's studies.

== Early life and education ==
Alison Bernstein was born on June 8, 1947, in Brooklyn and grew up in Roslyn Heights, New York. She was born as an only child into a Russian-Jewish family.

She graduated with a bachelor's degree in history from Vassar College in 1969. During her undergraduate studies, she was active in campus politics. Bernstein served as the president of her freshman class, and she was a member of Vassar Debate Club, the Student Judicial Committee, and the Young Democrats. After graduation, at the age of 22, she became the youngest person named to Vassar's board of trustees.

She pursued master's degree studies in history at Columbia University on a Danforth Scholarship, which is awarded to students "with passion for helping others". Bernstein graduated from her master's degree with the thesis American Indian and the New Deal in 1970. She also obtained a PhD in history from Columbia University in 1985, writing her dissertation on the impact of World War II on Native Americans, which later developed into her book American Indians and World War II: Toward a New Era in Indian Affairs.

== Career ==
After obtaining her master's degree in 1970, Bernstein started teaching at Staten Island Community College, and in 1974 got a job at the federal Fund for the Improvement of Postsecondary Education in Washington, D.C. In 1980, she left the fund to serve for two years as a dean at Sangamon State University, which was later acquired by the University of Illinois at Springfield. In 1982, she started her career in the Ford Foundation, where she was overseeing other grantmakers for the foundation's Education, Creativity and Free Expression Program. Bernstein worked at the Ford Foundation until 2010, with the exception of two years from 1990 to 1992, when she took a short leave in order to become an Associate Dean at Princeton. She finished her career as a Director of the Institute for Women's Leadership at Rutgers University, where she served from 2011 until her death in 2016.

== Importance ==
Alison Bernstein is a highly regarded scholar in the fields of humanities and women's studies.

At the Ford Foundation, she started a large number of initiatives that benefited historically underrepresented groups. Bernstein maintained program fellowships for minorities, and helped to create the International Fellowship Program with the largest Ford grant in history, which was $300 million for proven community leaders from marginalized communities around the world. In addition, she started The Native Arts and Cultures Fund, which makes grants available for Native artists and cultural leaders. She also supported the Women's Research and Resource Center at Spelman College, which was the first women's research center at a historically Black college.

She sponsored research that informed policy and practice in sexuality such as reproductive health, youth development, and LGBT concerns, which were controversial at that time, as well as pioneering work on the social role of religion in US society. Also, Bernstein showed support for community colleges and K-12 education reforms.

== Publications ==
=== Books ===
- American Indians and World War II: Towards a New Era in Indian Affairs. 1991

=== Scientific work ===
- From Dogmas to Dilemmas. 2002
- Gender Differences: Struggles Around Needs and Rights in South Africa. 2001
- Book Review: Crazy for Democracy: Women in Grassroots Movements Temma Kaplan; Gender in Third World Politics Georgina Waylen. 1999
- Diversity and disadvantage: Feminist perspectives from the USA and South Africa. 1998
- Of Riots and Rainbows: South Africa, the US, and the Pitfalls
