= Douglass Residential College =

Residential college at Rutgers University-New Brunswick

Coordinates: 40.484°N 74.435°W

- Former names: New Jersey College for Women; Douglass College
- Type: 1918-2007 women's college; 2007-present "residential college"
- Established: 1918
- Parent institution: Rutgers University-New Brunswick
- Affiliations: Institute for Women's Leadership
- Students: 2,500
- Location: New Brunswick, New Jersey, United States
- Website: douglass.rutgers.edu

Douglass Residential College is a non-degree-granting program established in 2007 and open to Rutgers undergraduates at any of the degree-granting schools of Rutgers University-New Brunswick. It replaced the liberal arts degree-granting Douglass College which had been opened in 1918. Douglass, originally named New Jersey College for Women, was renamed in 1955 after its founder and first dean, Mabel Smith Douglass.

The degree-granting liberal arts Douglass College closed after it was merged with the other undergraduate colleges at Rutgers-New Brunswick in 2007. The non-degree-granting, optional, supplementary program called "Douglass Residential College" that replaced it is open to students at any of the degree-granting schools of Rutgers-New Brunswick.

== Deans ==
- Mabel Smith Douglass (1918–1932): A graduate of Barnard College, Mabel Smith Douglass was a leader of the New Jersey State Federation of Women's Clubs.
- Margaret Trumbull Corwin (1934–1955): A graduate of Bryn Mawr with a master's degree from Yale. It was during Dean Corwin’s tenure that the New Jersey College for Women became Douglass College.
- Mary Bunting (1955–1960): A graduate of Vassar with advanced degrees in microbiology from the University of Wisconsin. She resigned to become president of Radcliffe.
- Ruth Marie Adams (1960–1966): An Adelphi graduate with a doctorate in English from Radcliffe. She resigned to become president of Wellesley.
- Margery Somers Foster (1967–1975): A graduate of Wellesley with a doctorate in economics from Radcliffe.
- Jewel Plummer Cobb (1976–1981): A graduate of Talladega College in Alabama with advanced degrees in cell biology from New York University. She resigned to become president of California State University at Fullerton.
- Mary S. Hartman (1982–1994): A graduate of Swarthmore with an M.A. and Ph.D. from Columbia University in history, Mary S. Hartman became a member of the Douglass History Department in 1968 (Institute for Women’s Leadership, 2004, p. 1). She served as director of the Women’s Studies Institute from 1975 to 1977, was named acting dean in 1981, and dean in 1982. She resigned to become director of the Institute for Women’s Leadership at Rutgers University.
- Barbara A. Shailor (1996–2001): A graduate of Wilson College with a master's degree and doctorate in classics from the University of Cincinnati. She resigned to become Director of the Beinecke Rare Book and Manuscript Library at Yale University. She was appointed the Deputy Provost for the Arts at Yale University in 2003.
- Carmen Twillie Ambar (2002–2008): A graduate of the Edmund A. Walsh School of Foreign Service at Georgetown University, Carmen Twillie Ambar earned a law degree from Columbia School of Law and a master’s in public affairs from the Woodrow Wilson School of Public and International Affairs at Princeton University. In 2008, Ambar resigned to become president of Cedar Crest College in Allentown, PA, and in 2017 she became President of Oberlin College..
- Jacquelyn S. Litt (2010–2022): A graduate of William Smith College with an M.A. and Ph.D. in sociology from University of Pennsylvania. Litt, who established unique programs at Douglass Residential College, will continue working at Rutgers as professor of sociology and women's studies in the Rutgers School of Arts and Sciences in New Brunswick.
- Meghan Rehbein (2023-present): A graduate of Hampshire College with a degree in anthropology, with an M.A. in religious studies from Sacred Heart University and an Ed.D in organizational leadership from Stockton College.

== Notable alumnae and year of graduation ==
- Alice Aycock DC'68: Sculptor
- Catherine H. Bailey NJC '42: plant geneticist
- Cheri Beasley DC'88: Chief Justice, North Carolina Supreme Court
- Leonie Brinkema DC'65: Judge, U.S. District Court, E.D. Va.
- Elise M. Boulding NJCW'40: Peace activist, sociologist
- Elizabeth Cavanna Harrison NJCW'29: (known as Betty Cavanna and also used names Elizabeth Headley and Betsy Allen) children's book author
- Carol T. Christ DC'66: former President, Smith College, current Chancellor of University of California, Berkeley
- Janet Evanovich DC'65: author
- Jeanne Fox DC'74: Former president, New Jersey Board of Public Utilities
- Jaynee LaVecchia DC'76: New Jersey Supreme Court Justice
- Susan Martin DC'68: retired Georgetown University professor, expert on international migrations
- Annette Meyers, 1955, mystery novelist
- Imbolo Mbue DC'02: novelist
- Janet L. Norwood DC'45: economist, US Commissioner of Labor Statistics (1979–1991)
- Judith Shatin DC'71: composer
- Kathleen C. Taylor, DC'64, award-winning chemist and automotive engineer
- Freda L. Wolfson DC'76: Judge, U.S. District Court, D. N.J.
