= Military attachés and observers in the Russo-Japanese War =

Foreign officers and journalists who witnessed the Russo-Japanese War

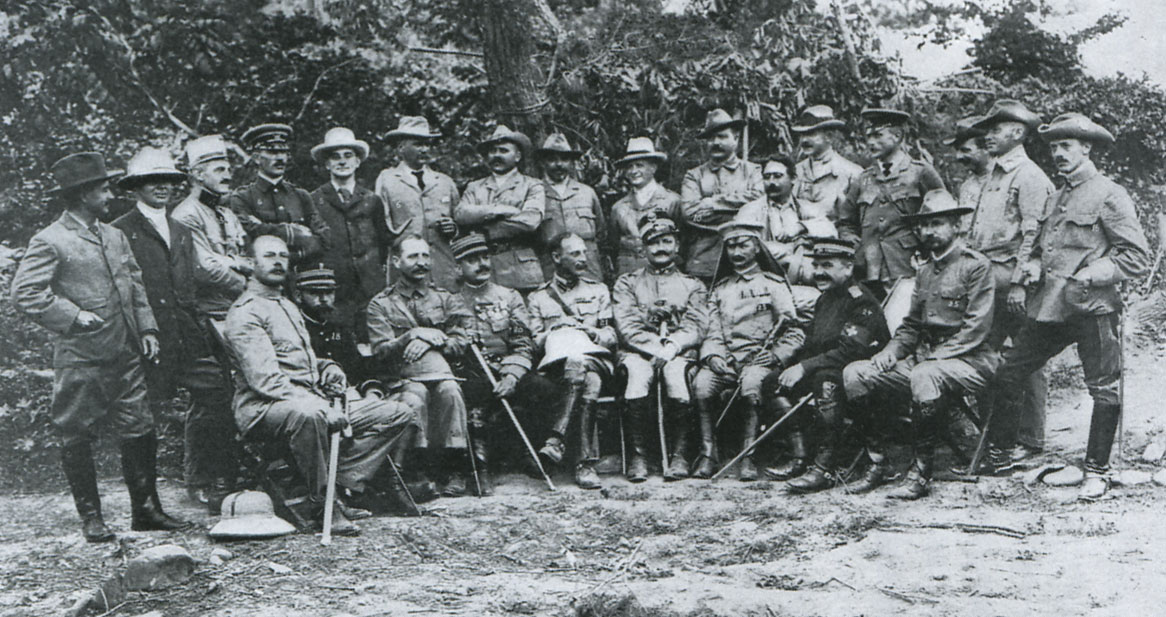
Western military attachés and war correspondents with the Japanese forces after the Battle of Shaho (1904): 1. Robert Collins; 2. David Fraser; 3. Capt. Adalbert Dani von Gyarmata und Magyar-Cséke; 4. Capt. James Jardine; 5. Frederick McKenzie; 6. Edward Knight; 7. Charles Victor-Thomas; 8. Oscar Davis; 9. William Maxwell; 10. Robert MacHugh; 11. William Dinwiddie; 12. Frederick Palmer; 13. Capt. Berkeley Vincent; 14. John Bass; 15. Martin Donohoe; 16. Capt. ____; 17. Capt. Max Hoffmann; 18. ____; 19. __Fritz Gertsch__; 20. ____; 21. Gen. Sir Ian Hamilton; 22. ____; 23. Gunther von Etzel; 24. ____; 25. ____.

Military attachés and observers in the Russo-Japanese War were foreign observers who oversaw the 1904–1905 Russo-Japanese War. Observers from several nations took part, and their reports influenced subsequent military strategy in future conflict, including World War I.

== Overview ==
The multi-national military attachés and observers who took part in the Russo-Japanese War were expressly engaged in collecting data and analyzing the interplay between tactics, strategy, and technical advances in weapons and machines of modern warfare. For example, reports evaluating the stationary battle at Port Arthur and the maneuver battle at Mukden demonstrated the lethality of modern warfare and foreshadow the combined effects of hand grenades, mortars, machine guns, and field artillery in World War I.

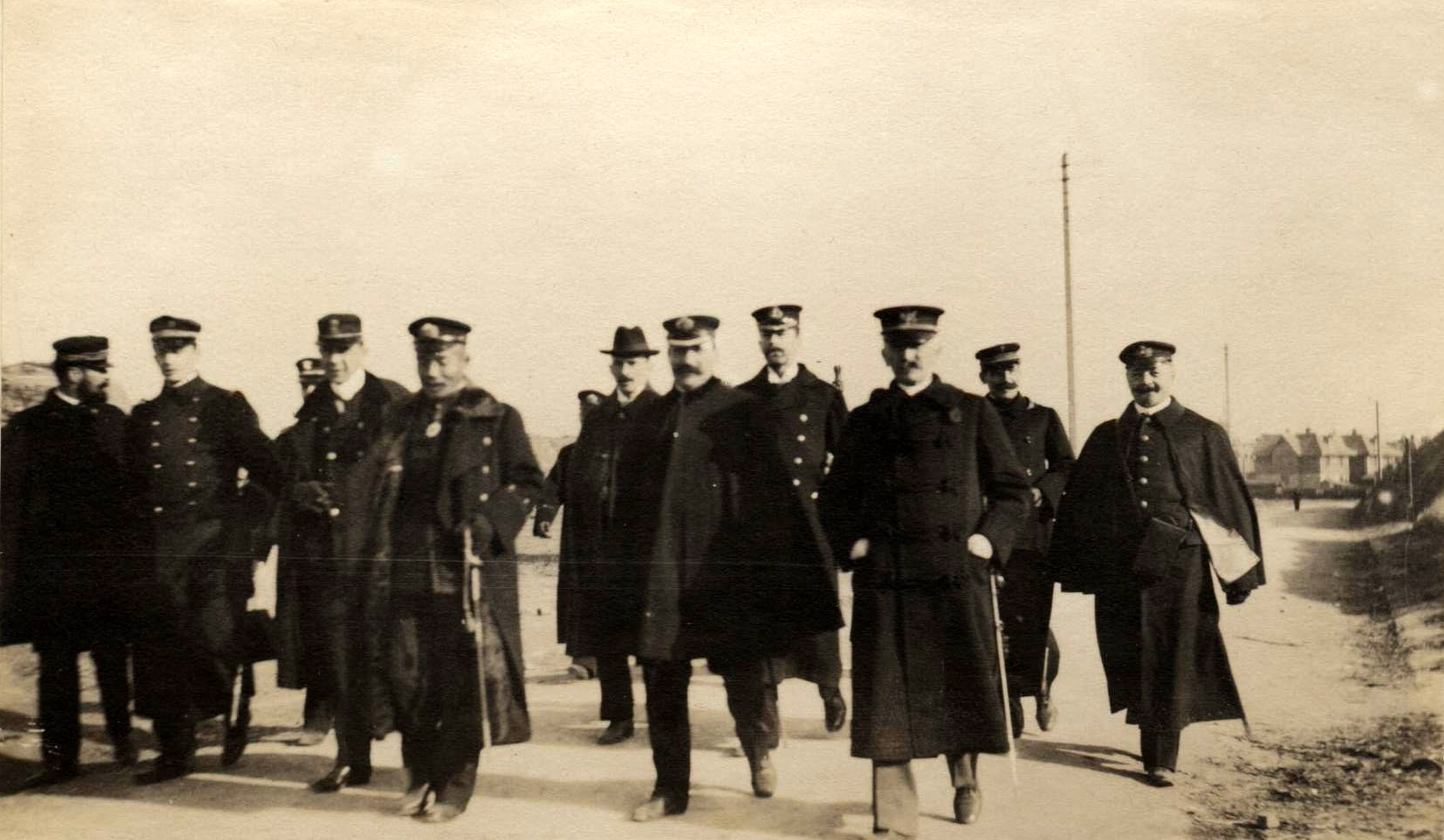
Japanese Minister of the Navy Admiral Yamamoto visiting the captured city of Dalny, just north of Port Arthur, in December 1904. Accompanying the Minister were several Western observers, including Italian naval attaché Ernesto Burzagli, who photographed the inspection tour.

Military and civilian observers from every major power closely followed the course of the war. Most were able to report on events from a perspective somewhat like what is now termed "embedded" positions within the land and naval forces of both Russia and Japan. These military attachés, naval attachés and other observers prepared voluminous first-hand accounts of the war and analytical papers. In-depth observer narratives of the war and more narrowly focused professional journal articles were written soon after the war; and these post-war reports conclusively illustrated the battlefield destructiveness of this conflict. This was the first time the tactics of entrenched positions for infantry defended with machine guns and artillery became vitally important, and both were factors which came to dominate in World War I.

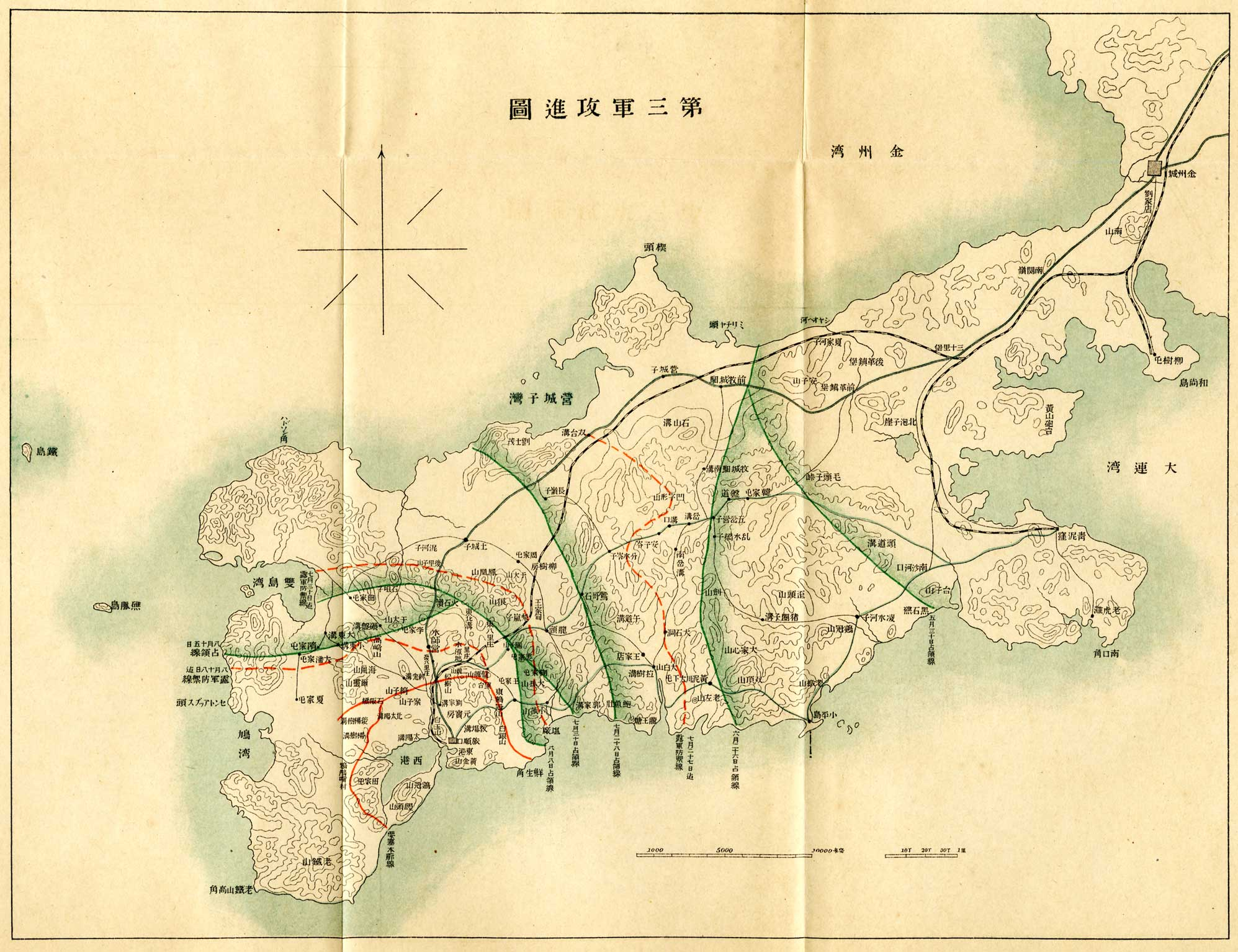
Map showing movement of the Japanese 3rd Army.

In 1904-1905, Sir Ian Hamilton was the military attaché of the Indian Army serving with the Japanese army in Manchuria. As the attaché to arrive earliest in Japan, he was recognized as the dean of the group. Also amongst the Western attachés observing the conflict were the future Lord Nicholson, Chief of the Imperial General Staff; John J. Pershing, later General of the Armies and head of the American Expeditionary Force in the First World War; Douglas MacArthur, later a United States General of the Army; and Enrico Caviglia, later Marshal of Italy.

Press coverage of the war was affected by restrictions on the movement of reporters and strict censorship. In all military conflicts which followed this 1904-1905 war, close attention to more managed reporting was considered essential by the Japanese. These concerns were considered inessential by the Russian command. The Russian press frequently revealed information deemed crucial by the opposing commanders; and the Japanese profited from the lack of military censorship on the Russian side. Information gathered from Russian newspapers was telegraphed by the Japanese military attaché in the Japanese embassy in Berlin; and it was received by the Japanese armies in Manchuria within six days.

The Russian war artist Vasili Vereshchagin was invited by Admiral Stepan Makarov to observe the war aboard Makarov's flagship Petropavlovsk. On April 13, 1904, the warship hit mines near Port Arthur; and nearly all aboard were killed. Vereshchagin's last work was recovered. The salvaged canvas depicted a council of war presided over by Admiral Makarov.

== Selected military attachés serving with Russian forces ==
=== Russian Imperial Army ===
American observers

- Capt. Sydney Cloman, U.S.
- Capt. William Voorhees Judson, U.S. Judson arrived in St. Petersburg in early 1904. He was eventually attached to the Russian Army in Manchuria and was captured by the Japanese at the Battle of Mukden on March 10, 1905. He was returned to the United States by the Japanese.

Judson's initial prediction about the Russians’ chances was positive. In a letter to the U.S. Ambassador dated July 26, 1904, he explained that the Russians were doing better than expected and believed within a few weeks they would have no reason to fear the Japanese any longer. He did cite that the war was not popular among Russian troops, but he felt their attitudes would change when the army went on the offensive. Upon moving to Manchuria, Judson's opinion of the situation began to change. In a letter to the U.S. ambassador dated October 25, 1904, he described the tactical situation as a stalemate and was not certain as to which side would be victorious.

Judson was shocked at the carnage produced by modern warfare. He said in his official report, “I saw one battle in which the Russian slain outnumbered the Union dead on twelve of the greatest battlefields of the Civil War.” Judson believed future wars would prove so costly that even victors would not be able to justify waging them. He viewed the Russo-Japanese War as conflict without a clear winner. According to Judson, both combatants were anxious to seek peace and had little to show for their efforts. He concluded that in order for the U.S. to promote peace, it must exercise diligence in preparing for war and be prepared for an international call for disarmament.

- Col. Valery Havard U.S. - Colonel Valery Havard, an Assistant Surgeon General in the United States Army, arrived in St. Petersburg as a military attaché on December 7, 1904. He arrived at the front in Manchuria on February 8, 1905. After being embedded with Russian forces just over a month, Havard was captured by Japanese forces at the Battle of Mukden. Upon reaching Tokyo he was sent back to the United States.

The purpose of Colonel Havard's observations was to ascertain important information about the changing battlefield and how to apply it to the Army Medical Corps. In his official report, Havard compiled a list of lessons learned from the Russo-Japanese experience. He noted the lack of frontal assaults that were the result of improved weaponry, particularly the machine gun. Flanking movements became more necessary to avoid the machine gun, which necessitated increased frequency and distance of forced marches. In previous wars, soldiers were able to rest at night and armies saw little action during winter months. Attacks were often ordered at night and the waging of war never ceased, even in sub-zero temperatures. According to Havard, the result of these trends was soldiers experiencing an increased amount of battle fatigue, as well as resurgence in the usefulness of the bayonet in night assaults. The Japanese claimed seven percent of their casualties resulted from bayonet wounds.

According to Havard, casualty trends were changing with the employment of modern weaponry. Hard-jacketed rifle bullets were deadly at greater ranges. Despite this fact, the number of soldiers killed in action by the rifle diminished due to the increased effectiveness of artillery. The advancements in field artillery technology made it necessary for battle lines to be farther apart, resulting in rifles being outside of their effective ranges. The increased accuracy of modern artillery pieces led to increased ratios of artillery casualties. In some battles during the war, fifty percent of casualties were the result of artillery fire. Havard claimed that during Russo- Japanese War, both belligerents experienced higher levels of casualties than had been noted in earlier wars, with a great ratio of killed to wounded. According to Havard, one out of every four soldiers wounded during the conflict died from their wounds.

Because of his observations in Manchuria, Havard recommended changes to the U.S. Army's Medical Corps. He suggested the war department devise a plan to train and mobilize large numbers of medical personnel for war and to promote the development of civilian organizations like the Red Cross. Because of the increased number of casualties resulting from modern weaponry, Havard stressed the significance of training enlisted soldiers in assisting medical officers in field hospitals. He also spoke to the importance of devising an adequate evacuation system from the battlefield to military hospitals. He explained that railroads were of important in this process. Havard also advocated the implementation of telephone technology in order for hospital staff to have quick access to information from the battle.

British observers

- Gen. Montagu Gerard, Indian Army
- Maj. J. M. Horne, UK.
- Col. W. H. W. Waters, Indian Army

Other observers

- Capt. Nils Edlund, Sweden
- Capt. Carl von Hoffman, Germany.
- Capt. Oskar Nyqvist, Norway

=== Russian Imperial Navy ===
- Somerset Arthur Gough-Calthorpe, UK (1904–1905).
- Lieutenant Dimitur Dobrev, Bulgaria, present at Tsushima

== Selected military attachés serving with Japanese forces ==
=== Japanese Imperial Army ===
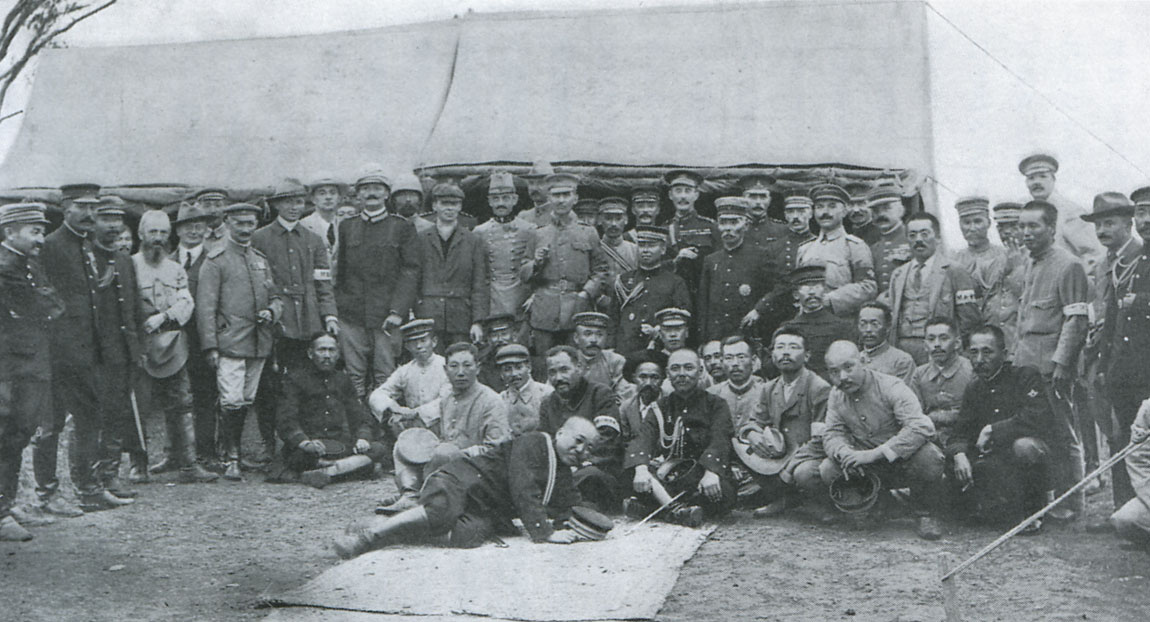
Japanese General Kuroki Tamemoto and his staff were photographed with Western military attachés and war correspondent observers after the Battle of Shaho (1904). The most senior of the military attachés, Gen. Sir Ian Hamilton, center, stands with left hand in a coat pocket and a stick tucked under his right arm.

United States of America observers

- 1Lt. Granville Roland Fortescue, USA
- Maj. Joseph Kuhn, USA
- MG Arthur MacArthur Jr., USA Chafing at the bit at his Fort Mason, San Francisco headquarters, MacArthur requested that he also be assigned as a military observer upon hearing of the outbreak of war between Russia and Japan in 1904. He finally secured the appointment, but arrived in Manchuria in mid-March, 1905, just after the major fighting had ended with the Japanese triumph at the Battle of Mukden. When the Portsmouth Peace Conference was convened in August, MacArthur was sent to Tokyo as military attaché to the American legation.
- Capt. Peyton C. March, USA
- Dr. Anita Newcomb McGee
- Capt. John J. Pershing, USA Captain John Pershing arrived in Tokyo as an attaché to the Japanese Army on March 5, 1905. At that time he claimed the outcome of the war was uncertain, as both sides were bogged down after months of indecisive fighting. During his first days in the country, the Japanese achieved a pivotal victory at the Battle of Mukden. According to his memoirs, the way the Japanese celebrated led him to believe they had actually expected defeat at the hands of the Russians. Pershing's observations as an attaché were significant because they provided a first-hand account from the perspective of a company grade officer who had previously seen combat during the Indian Wars and the Spanish–American War.

According to Captain Pershing, the military attachés assigned to the Japanese were treated like royalty when possible. When not in the field, servants were provided and they were given the best provisions available. When they were embedded with the army, the Japanese exercised due diligence in ensuring their safety from battlefield dangers. Eventually Pershing complained of the overprotective measures employed by his hosts. When he attempted to write to his Army superiors about his dissatisfaction, the Japanese intercepted his correspondence and responded by allowing him more freedom to move about with Japanese troops. On occasion Pershing was present with Japanese cavalry reconnaissance patrols during minor skirmishes with Russian forces.

In his memoirs, Pershing noted that most American observers were surprised at the tactical success experienced by the Japanese during the war. He explained that the world military minds held the Russian Army in high regard ever since its defeat of Napoleon's Grande Army almost a century earlier. Though he praised the Japanese for their achievements, he felt they were not as significant as future history books might claim. In his estimation, the Japanese had defeated one of the poorest armies in Europe. The Russians lacked the proper equipment and organization to achieve victory against a modern power. He believed these shortfalls were compounded by the lack of motivation in the Russian ranks, caused by internal domestic strife. The war ended with both the Japanese and the Russians eager to seek peace. Pershing felt that if the war had continued, the Russians may have gained an upper hand as resupply of Japanese troops in Manchuria had become more difficult at the end of hostilities.

- Louis Seaman wrote a book entitled The Real Triumph of Japan describing the Imperial Japanese Army Medical Department's success in preventing infectious diseases, especially in relation to casualties sustained. Seaman later wrote, "The supreme test of an army's medical organization comes, of course, in time of battle. The severer the clash of arms, the greater is the strain made upon the medical organization. In no great battle in history has the medical organization proven adequate to the demands made upon it; but the best record ever made in that direction, embodying as it did an approach to perfection, was that of the Japanese in the war with Russia." Seaman's praise, intended to push reforms of the U.S. Army Medical Department, overlooked the reasons for the apparent success by the Japanese Medical Department. Seaman noted that although wartime soldiers throughout the nineteenth century were generally more likely to die from disease rather than from combat trauma, eight percent of the Japanese army died from enemy fire while less than two percent died from disease. However, he attributed the success to Japanese efficiency and did not consider other factors that may have affected the statistics.

British observers

- Richard Bannatine-Allason, UK.
- Capt. Alexander Bannerman, UK
- Maj. Aylmer Haldane, UK
- LTG. Ian Standish Monteith Hamilton, Indian Army.
- Capt. Arthur Henry Seton Hart-Synnot, UK
- Col. John Hoad, Australia. See also, Australian Military Attaché
- Col. C. V. Hume, UK
- Capt. James Bruce Jardine, UK
- LTG. William Nicholson, 1st Baron Nicholson, UK
- Capt. Herbert Cyril Thacker, Canada.
- Col. John Walter Graham Tulloch, Indian Army.
- Capt. Berkeley Vincent, UK
- Capt. John Leader, UK

French observers

- Charles Pierre René Victoire Corvisart, France.
- François de Négrier, France.
- Charles-Émile Bertin, France.

German observers

- Gunther von Etzel, Germany.
- Max Hoffmann, Germany.

Austro-Hungarian observers

- Adalbert Dani von Gyarmata und Magyar-Cséke
- Erwin Franz

Italian observers

- Enrico Caviglia, Italy.

Ottoman observers

- Colonel Pertev Bey, Ottoman Empire

Swedish observers

- Peter Hegardt, Sweden
- Josef Hammar, Sweden

Swiss observers

- Fritz Gertsch
- Richard Vogel

=== Japanese Imperial Navy ===
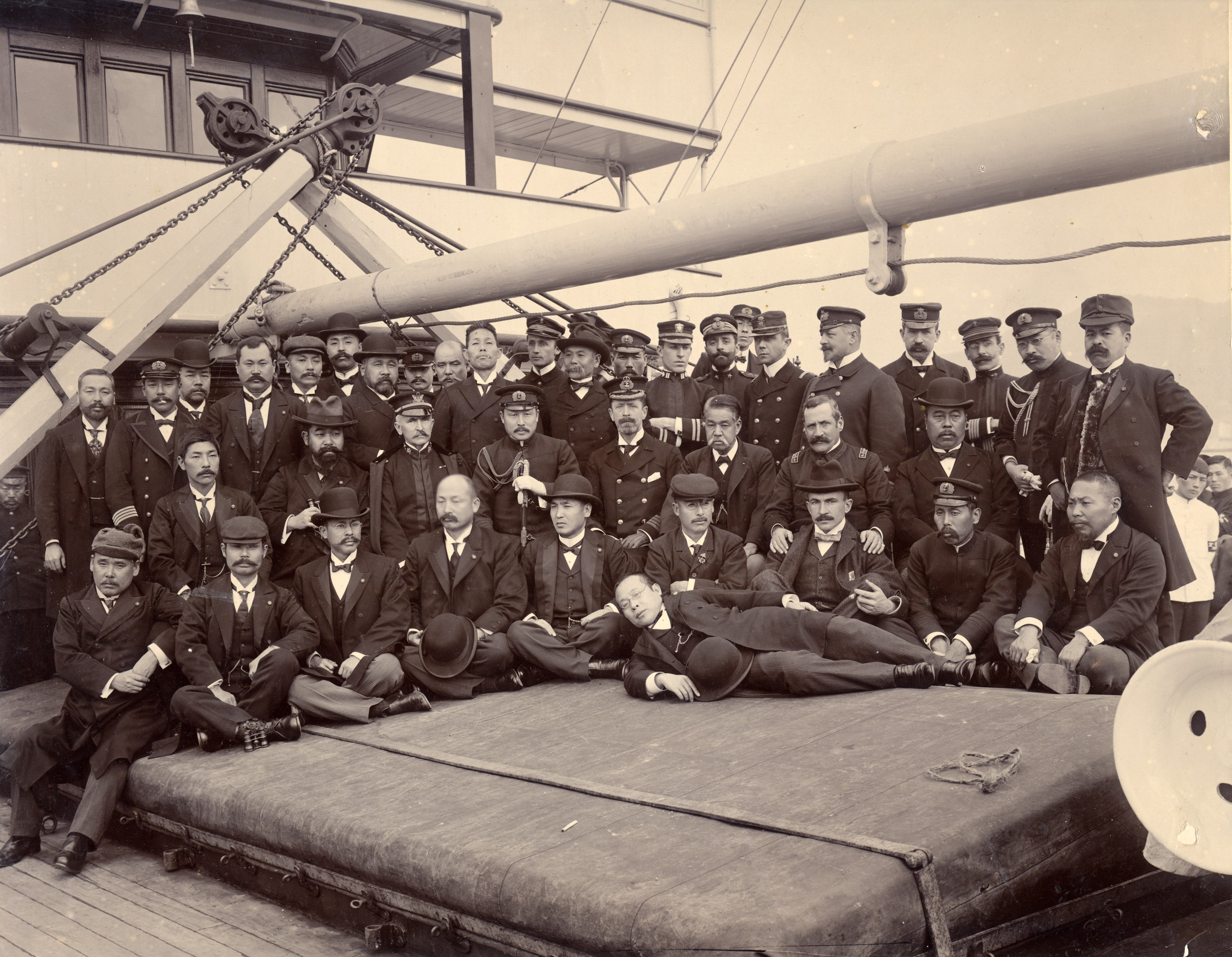
Italian naval attaché Ernesto Burzagli aboard a Japanese naval vessel at Yokohama en route to Port Arthur during the Russo-Japanese War (1904).

Unlike their Army counterparts who could be kept at a safe distance to frontline activities as guests, a military attaché to the Navy had to be on board a ship in wartime and in battles to be an observer. At the beginning of Russo-Japanese War, the Imperial Russian Navy held a far superior position in total warship tonnage and the total number of large naval guns to the Imperial Japanese Navy, so the assignment meant risking their lives for all the navy officers appointed. Captain Pakenham got drenched in blood when a Russian shell hit battleship Asahi taking several Japanese lives, and the gunnery officer Manuel García took over command of a turret when cruiser Nisshin's gunnery officer was likewise killed, both during the Battle of Tsushima.

All the following naval attachés to the Imperial Japanese Navy rose at least to the rank of Admiral in later years:

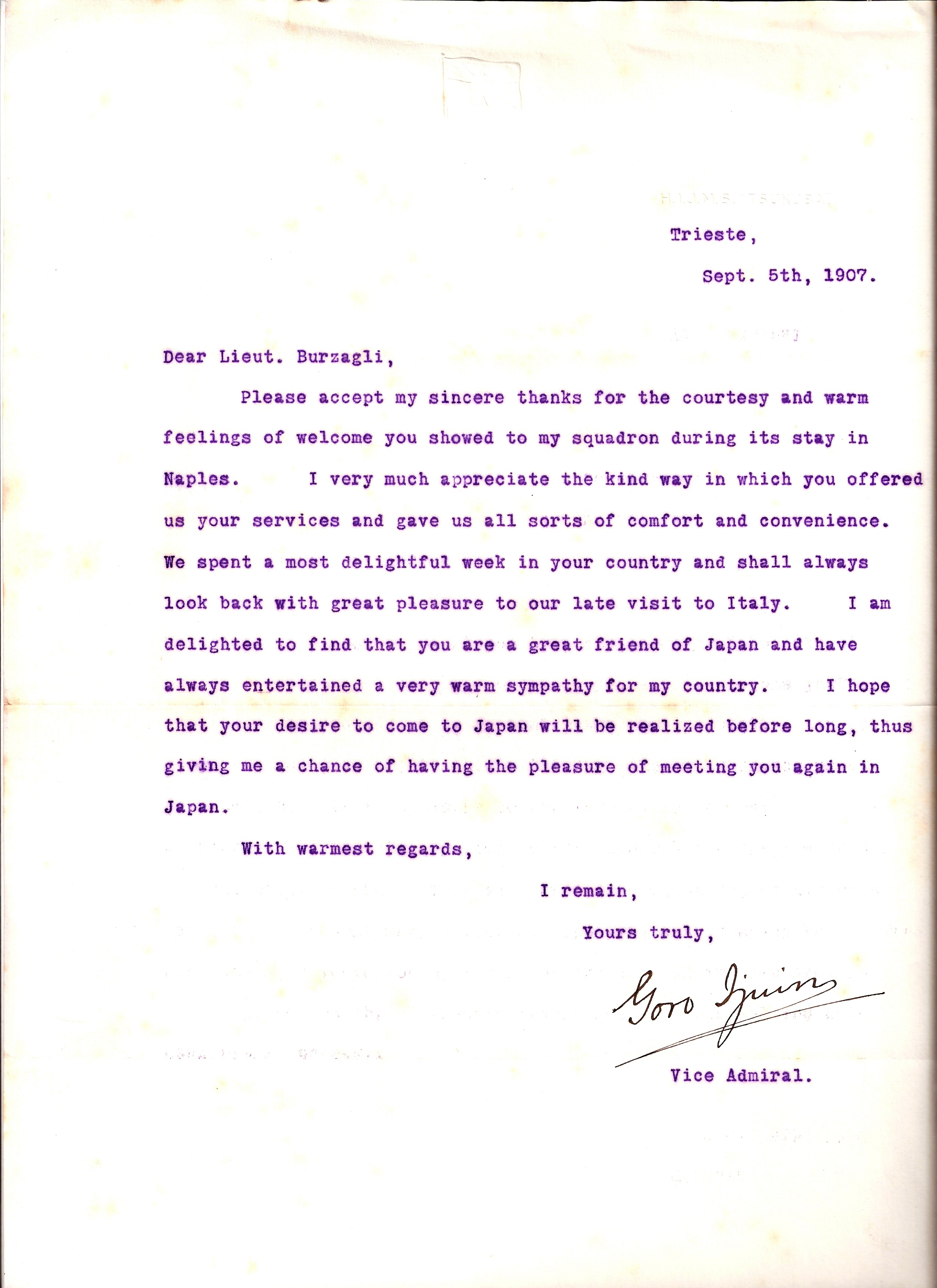
Letter from Vice admiral Ijuin Gorō to Italian Royal Navy Lieutenant Ernesto Burzagli thanking him for courtesies extended to the Imperial Japanese Navy Second Fleet which visited Italy in 1907.

- Ernesto Burzagli, Italy. Burzagli later became Admiral, Chief of Staff (Commander in Chief) of Regia Marina (Royal Italian Navy), and then Senator of Italy.
- Captain William Pakenham. British Royal Navy. He later became an Admiral, Fourth Sea Lord of the Admiralty, Commander-in-Chief of North America and West Indies.
- Captain Ernest Troubridge. Royal Navy. Troubridge later became Private Secretary to the First Lord of the Admiralty, and Chief of the War Staff.
- Captain John Hutchison. Royal Navy. Present at the Battle of the Yellow Sea in the cruiser Asama. He later became naval aide-de-camp to King George V in 1911.
- Captain Thomas Jackson. Royal Navy. Present at the Battle of Tsushima in the cruiser Azuma.
- Manuel Domecq García (es), Argentina Captain Domecq García was the head of Argentine commission sent to Genoa, Italy in 1903 to oversee the construction of armoured cruisers Bernardino Rivadavia, which was sold to Japan on 30 December 1903 and became IJN Kasuga on 1 January 1904, and Mariano Moreno (likewise became IJN Nisshin). After formally transferring the two ships to the Japanese receiving commission (and the Royal Navy crew with some Italian stokers), he moved to Paris. He obtained a formal appointment by the Argentine Navy as the naval attaché to the Imperial Japanese Navy in April, returned his family to Buenos Aires, and arrived in Yokohama on 20 May 1905 via London, New York, Washington D.C., San Francisco and Honolulu, a week before the battle of Tsushima. Being stationed in the IJN cruiser Nisshin, he experienced one of the largest maritime battles in history as an observer. He returned to Argentina two years later. García submitted "Russo-Japanese War, Records by a Military Attaché" in 5 volumes, about 1400 pages, to the Argentine Navy, which is in the collection of Maritime Museum Ing. Cerviño National Nautical School in Buenos Aires. He became Admiral and Commander in Chief of the Argentine Navy, and later, Minister of Navy (Ministro de Marina) of the country.

== War correspondents ==
- Ellis Ashmead-Bartlett, The Times (London), Daily Telegraph.
- Maurice Baring, The Morning Post (London).
- Richard Barry, Eastern Illustrated War News.
- Luigi Barzini, Sr., Corriere della Sera (Milan).
- John Poster Bass, Chicago Daily News.
- Stephen Bonsal, New York Herald.
- Eugen Binder-Kriegelstein, Berliner Lokal-Anzeiger (Berlin Local Advertiser).
- W. H. Brill, Associated Press and Reuter's Telegraph Agency.
- Ernest Brindle, Daily Mail (London).
- Francis Brinkley, The Times.
- Bennet Burleigh, Daily Telegraph (London).
- Robert Moore Collins, Reuters.
- Franklin Clarkin, New York Post.
- J. M. Cockran, Leslie's Weekly.
- Oscar King Davis, New York Herald.
- Richard Harding Davis, Collier's.
- Georges de la Salle, Agence Havas (Paris).
- George Denny, Associated Press (New York).
- William Dinwiddie, New York Herald.
- William Henry Donald, New York Herald.
- Martin Henry Donohoe, Daily Chronicle (London).
- James H. Dunn, New York Globe.
- Edwin Emerson.
- Lewis Etzel, Daily Telegraph (London).
- John Fox, Jr., Scribner's Magazine.
- David Stewart Fraser, The Times.
- _____ Froissart.
- Lord Brooke, Reuters (London).
- _____ Hamilton, Manchester Guardian.
- Charles E. Hands, Daily Mail.
- J. H. Hare, Colliers Weekly
- Lionel James, The Times.; reported from aboard the SS Haimun
- _____Jensen, Berlingske Tidende (Copenhagen).
- Franz von Jessen.
- George Kennan, The Outlook.
- Edward Frederick Knight, Morning Post.
- Kanau Konishi, Asahi Shimbun (Tokyo)(ja). Later elected to House of Representatives 1912-1932, 1936-1937.
- Wilmott Harsant Lewis, a/k/a William Lewis (war correspondent), New York Herald.
- Richard H. Little, Chicago Daily News.
- Jack London, Collier's, New York Herald, Harper's Magazine, San Francisco Examiner, Hearst Press, New York Journal.
- Robert Joseph MacHugh, Daily Telegraph.
- William Maxwell, The Standard (London).
- Frederick McCormick, Associated Press.
- John T. McCucheon, Chicago Tribune.
- Francis McCullagh, New York Herald; Manchester Guardian.
- Frederick Arthur McKenzie, Daily Mail.
- Henry Middleton, Associated Press.
- Thomas Franklin Fairfax Millard, New York Herald.
- W. G. Morgan, New York Tribune.
- Ludovic Naudeau, Le Journal (Paris).
- _____ Ota, Jiji Shimpo (Tokyo).
- Frederick Palmer, New York Globe.
- Percival Philips, Daily Express (London).
- Herbert G. Ponting, Harper's Weekly.
- Melton Prior, Illustrated London News.
- Charles à Court Repington, The Times.
- James Ricalton, Travel Magazine.
- _____ Roucouli, Le Temps (Paris).
- _____ Saito, Nippon Shimbun.
- G. H. Scull, Commercial Advertiser.
- Richmond Smith, Associated Press.
- Willard Straight, Reuters.
- Charles Victor-Thomas, Le Gaulois (Paris), Le Temps.
- Frederic Villiers, Illustrated London News; The Graphic (London).
- Grant Wallace, San Francisco Bulletin.
- Stanley Washburn, Chicago Daily News.

== See also ==
- Military attachés and war correspondents in the First World War
- United Nations Military Observer
