= Kuroki Tamemoto =

Japanese general (1844–1923)

Count Kuroki Tamemoto GCMG
- 黒木 為楨
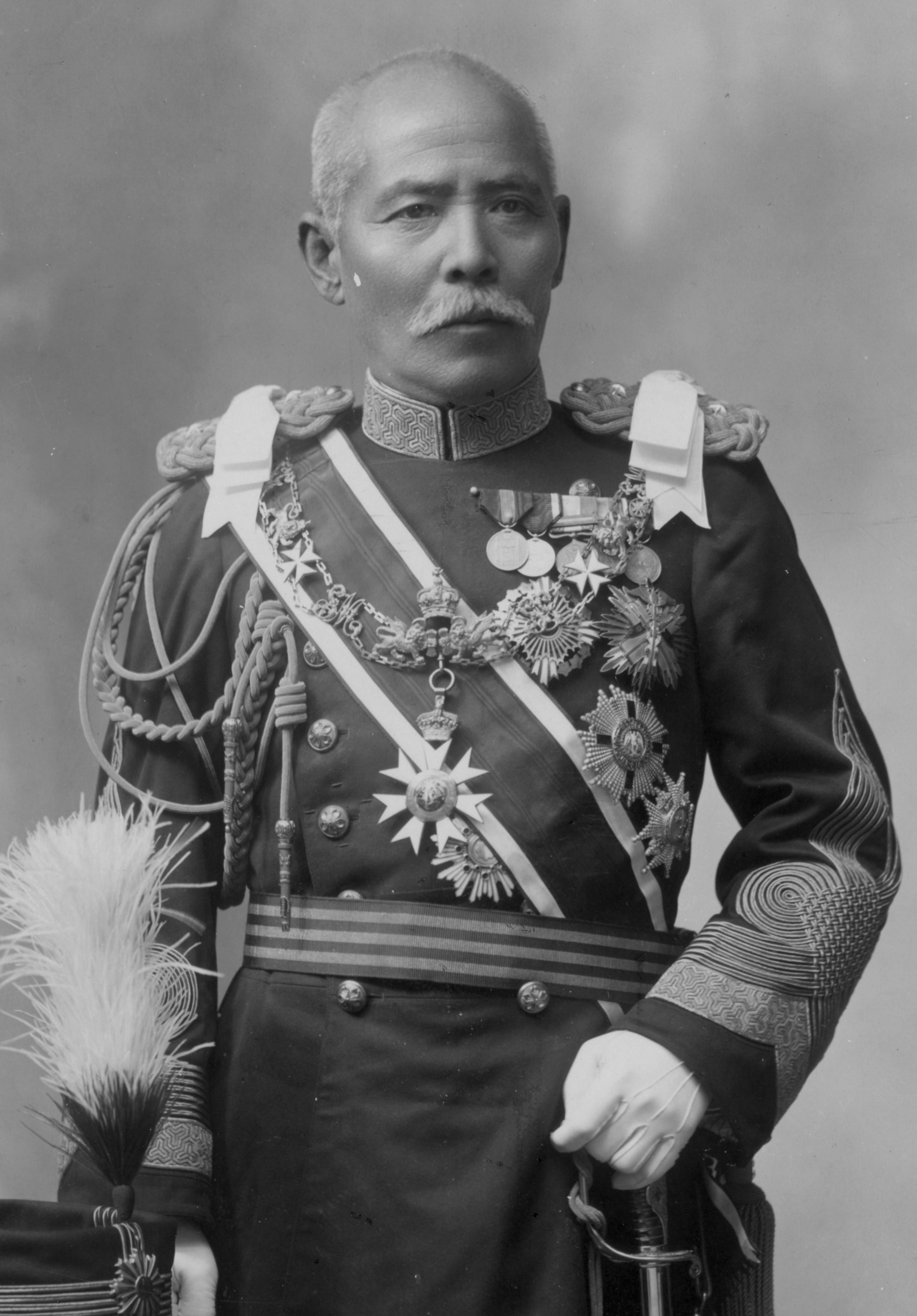
- Born: 3 May 1844; Kagoshima, Satsuma, Japan
- Died: 3 February 1923 (aged 78); Tokyo, Japan
- Military career
- Allegiance: Empire of Japan
- Branch: Imperial Japanese Army
- Service years: 1864–1869; 1871–1909
- Rank: General
- Commands: IJA 6th Division; IJA 1st Army
- Conflicts: Boshin War; First Sino-Japanese War; Russo-Japanese War

Count Kuroki Tamemoto GCMG (黒木 為楨; 3 May 1844 – 3 February 1923) was a Japanese general in the Imperial Japanese Army. He was the head of the Japanese First Army during the Russo-Japanese War; and his forces enjoyed a series of successes during the Manchurian fighting at the Battle of Yalu River, the Battle of Liaoyang, the Battle of Shaho and the Battle of Mukden.

== Early life ==
Born as the son of a samurai in the Satsuma domain in southern Kyūshū in what is now Kagoshima Prefecture, Kuroki fought for the Shimazu clan against the Tokugawa shogunate forces in the Boshin War of the Meiji Restoration. He led a platoon of infantry of the 1st Battalion at the Battle of Toba–Fushimi and later at the Battle of Utsunomiya Castle and was appointed a lieutenant in February 1869.

== Imperial Japanese Army ==
In July 1871, Kuroki was commissioned a captain in the 1st Battalion, now part of the newly established Imperial Japanese Army. Advancements followed in rapid succession. He was appointed to the 1st Grenadier Battalion in August 1872 and promoted to major. In February 1875, aged only 31, he was appointed commander of the 12th Hiroshima Infantry Regiment and promoted to lieutenant-colonel.

During the Satsuma Rebellion of 1877, Kuroki commanded a regiment against his own clan. He was promoted to colonel in November 1878 and appointed commander of the 2nd Grenadiers. He was promoted to major-general in May 1885 and to lieutenant-general in November 1893. He commanded the IJA 6th Division in the First Sino-Japanese War (1894-1895), during which time he took part in the Battle of Weihaiwei.

== Russo-Japanese War ==
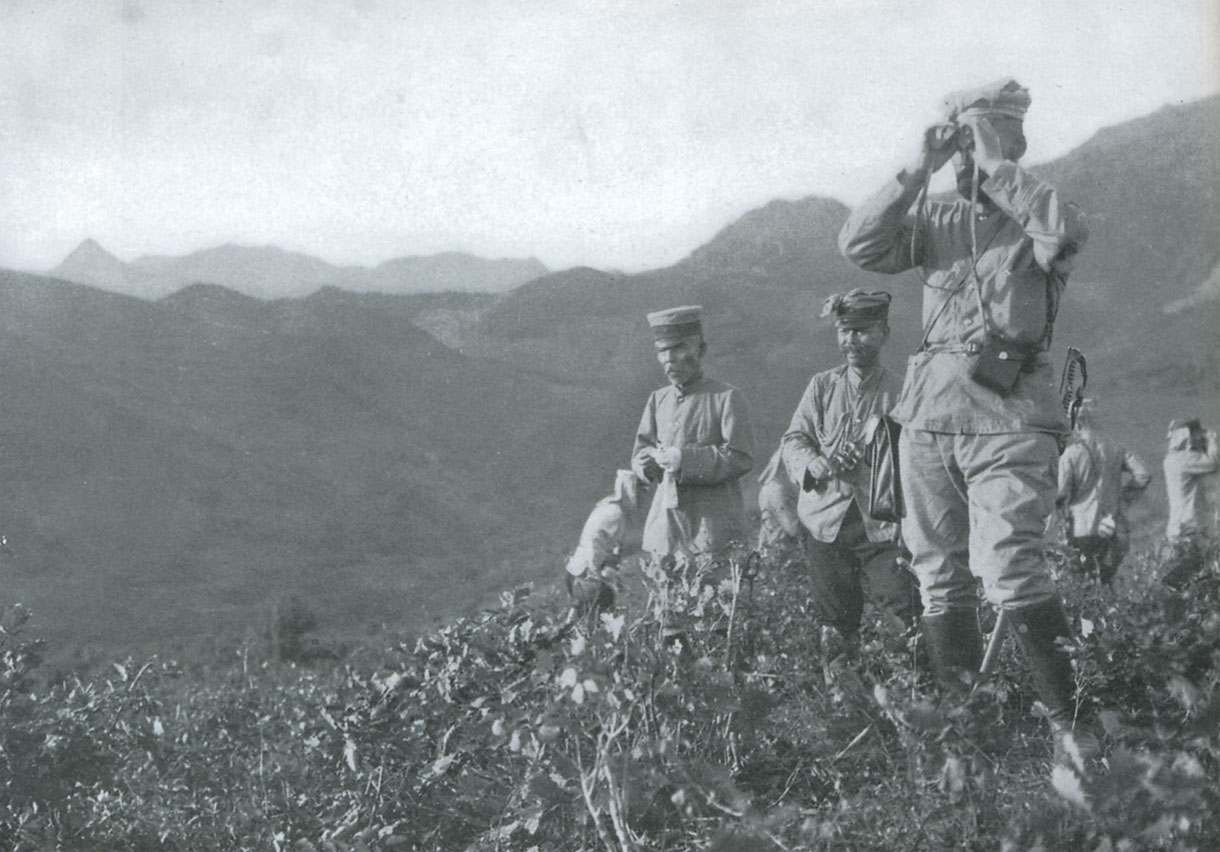
Kuroki and Chief of Staff Fujii Shigeta

Promoted to the rank of general in November 1903, Kuroki was appointed commander of the Japanese First Army upon the outbreak of the Russo-Japanese War the following year. After landing his forces at Chemulpo near Seoul in mid-February, Kuroki advanced north routing a smaller Russian force at the Battle of the Yalu River on 30 April-1 May 1904. Commanding the Japanese left flank at the Battle of Liaoyang, he repulsed a disorganized Russian attack from 25 August-3 September.

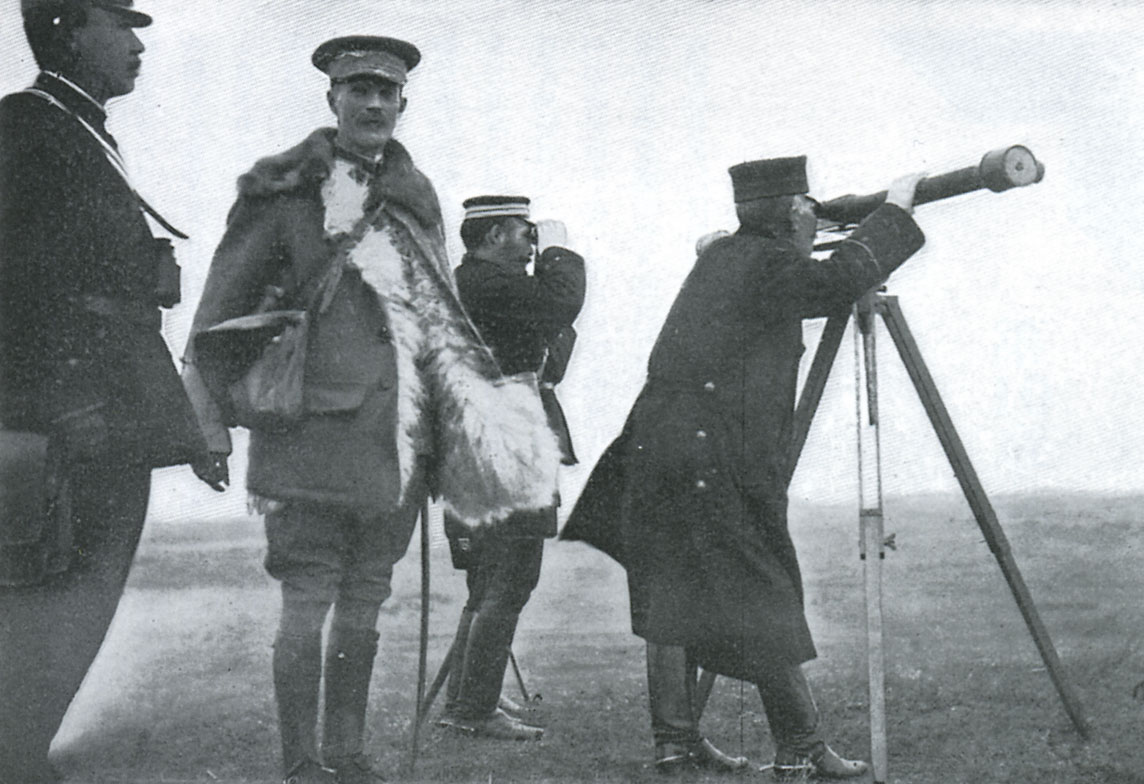
Sir Ian Hamilton (facing front) with Kuroki after the Japanese victory in the Battle of Shaho (1904).

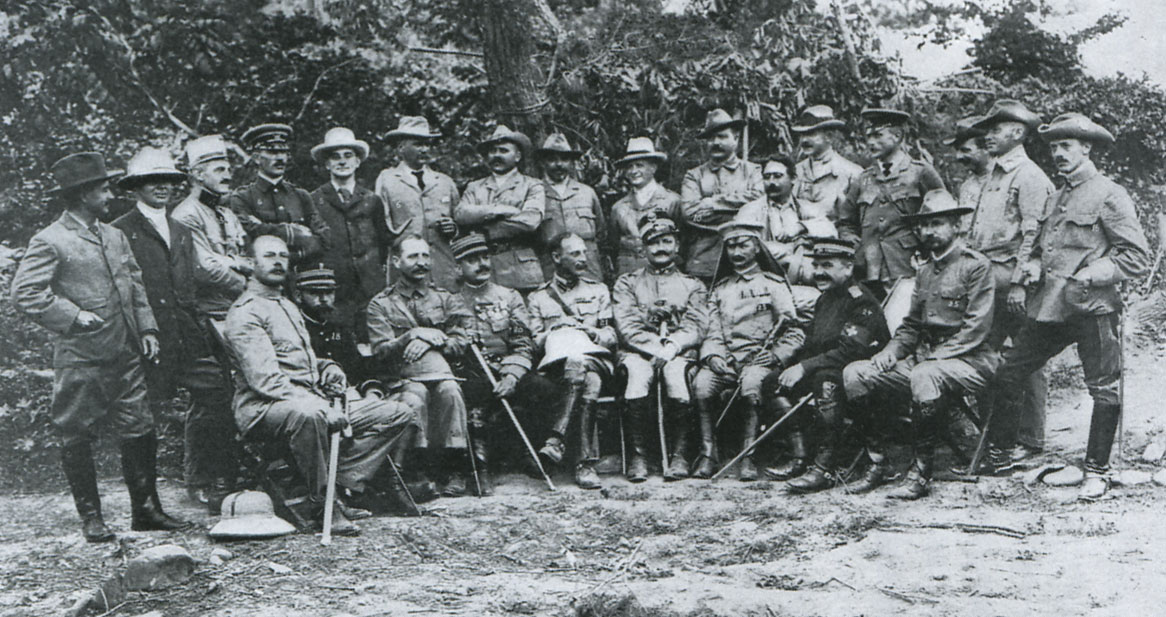
Western military attachés and war correspondents with the Japanese forces after the Battle of Shaho: 1. Robert Collins; 2. David Fraser; 3. Capt. Francois Dhani; 4. Capt. James Jardine; 5. Frederick McKenzie; 6. Edward Knight; 7. Charles Victor-Thomas; 8. Oscar Davis; 9. William Maxwell; 10. Robert MacHugh; 11. William Dinwiddie; 12. Frederick Palmer; 13. Capt. Berkeley Vincent; 14. John Bass; 15. Martin Donohoe; 16. Capt. ____; 17. Capt. Carl von Hoffman; 18. ____; 19. ____; 20. ____; 21. Gen. Sir Ian Hamilton; 22. ____; 23. ____; 24. ____; 25. ____.

During the Battle of Shaho, Kuroki's forces again successfully defended against the Russian offensive under General Aleksei Nikolaevich Kuropatkin from 5 October-17 October and later commanded the Japanese right flank at the Battle of Mukden from 21 February-10 March 1905.

During the war, Kuroki was obliged to devote attention to a large coterie of Western observers. Press coverage of the war was affected by restrictions on the movement of reporters and strict censorship. In all military conflicts which followed, close attention to more managed reporting was considered essential.

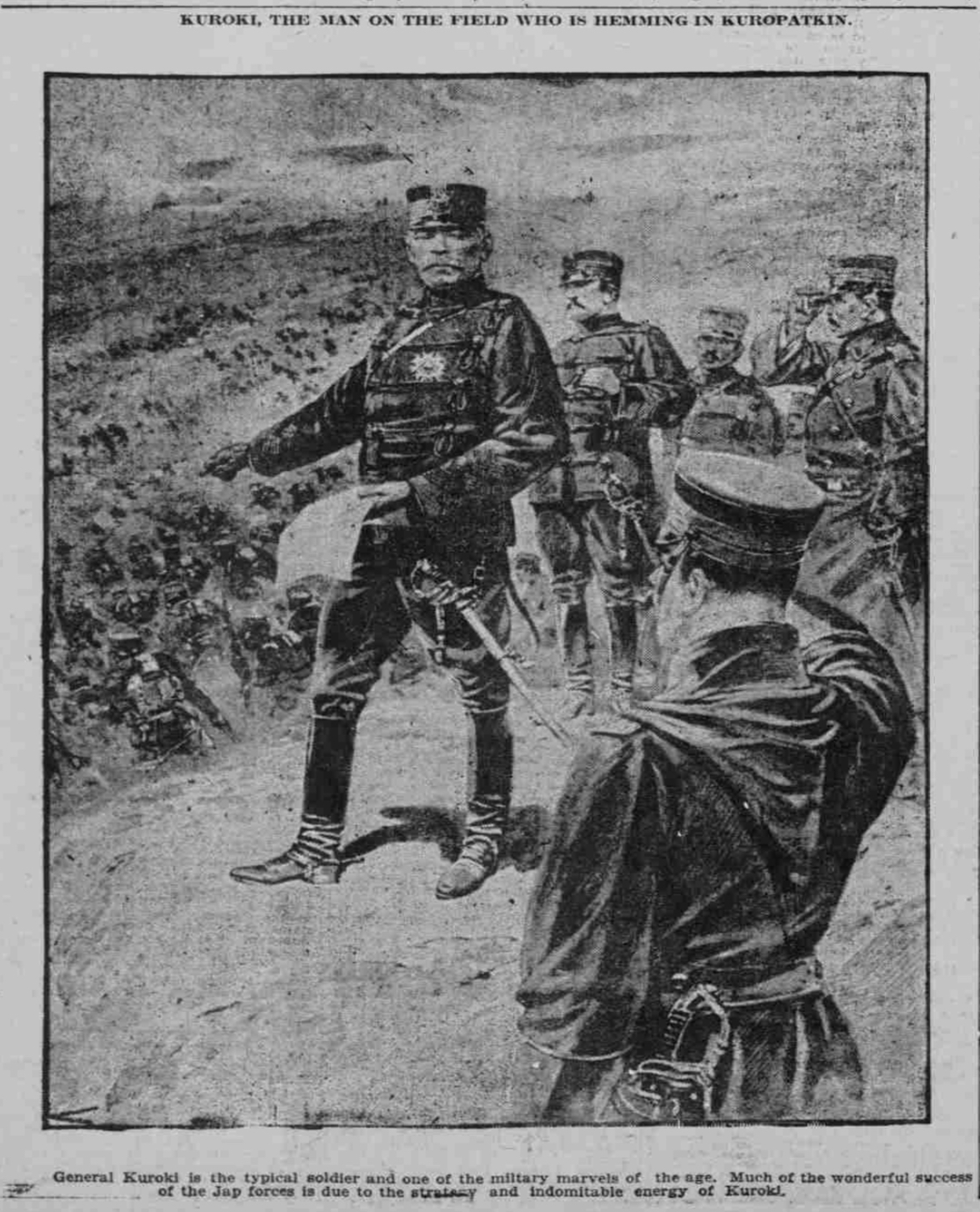
Kuroki on the battlefield in the Russo-Japanese War

The military attaché of the British Indian Army to the Japanese First Army, General Sir Ian Hamilton, would directly apply lessons learned in Kuroki's retinue. In the 1915 Gallipoli Campaign he appointed Captain William Maxwell, a British journalist who had reported on the Russo-Japanese War for the London Daily Mail to be Chief Field Censor. These experiences also provided a model that the U.S. military attaché, Captain John J. Pershing would adopt a decade later in Europe when he persuaded American journalist Frederick Palmer to take on the task of press accreditation for the American Expeditionary Force in France in World War I. Palmer, like Pershing, had experienced the Russo-Japanese War through the restrictions Kuroki had imposed.

== Later years ==
Despite his success and previous military record, Kuroki was one of two senior field commanders denied promotion to Field Marshal, thought to be largely because of his Satsuma origins at a time when the government was dominated by Chōshū rivals, although this may have been due to the internal politics within the Japanese Imperial Army of the time.

Retiring from military service in 1909, he received the title of danshaku (baron) and later hakushaku (count) under the kazoku peerage system. From 1917 onwards he served as a Lord Keeper of the Privy Seal of Japan (内大臣, Naidaijin) until his death from pneumonia in 1923.

== Honours ==
- Grand Cordon of the Order of the Rising Sun (30 May 1905)
- Hon. Knight Grand Cross of the Order of St. Michael and St. George (GCMG) (20 February 1906)
- Baron (1 April 1906)
- Order of the Golden Kite, 1st Class (1 April 1906)
- Grand Cordon of the Order of the Rising Sun with Paulownia Flowers (1 April 1906)
- Commander Grand Cross of the Order of the Sword (1906)
- Order of the Plum Blossom (28 December 1906)
- Count (1909)

Two towns in North America were named in his honor: Kuroki, Saskatchewan and Kuroki, North Dakota.
