= William Dinwiddie =

American journalist and photographer

William Dinwiddie (August 23, 1867 – June 17, 1934) was an American journalist, war photographer, writer and colonial administrator in the Philippines. He was born in Charlottesville, Virginia.

== Early life ==
Dinwiddie took some courses at Columbia University (1881–1883); and then he worked as a customs inspector in Corpus Christi, Texas (1883–1886). He worked for the Bureau of American Ethnology (1886–1895); and then he decided to change careers, becoming a foreign correspondent and photographer.

== War correspondent ==
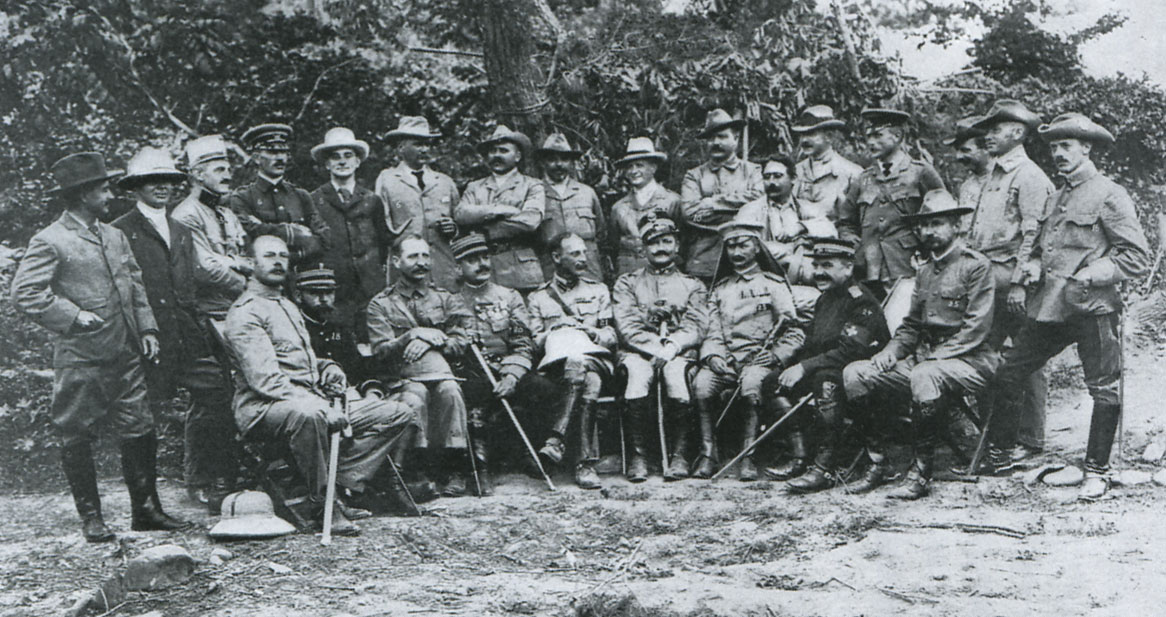
Western military attachés and war correspondents with the Japanese forces after the Battle of Shaho (1904): 1. Robert Collins; 2. David Fraser; 3. Capt. Francois Dhani; 4. Capt. James Jardine; 5. Frederick McKenzie; 6. Edward Knight; 7. Charles Victor-Thomas; 8. Oscar Davis; 9. William Maxwell; 10. Robert MacHugh; 11. William Dinwiddie; 12. Frederick Palmer; 13. Capt. Berkeley Vincent; 14. John Bass; 15. Martin Donohoe; 16. Capt. ____; 17. Capt. Carl von Hoffman; 18. ____; 19. ____; 20. ____; 21. Gen. Sir Ian Hamilton; 22. ____; 23. ____; 24. ____; 25. ____.

Dinwiddie was a journalist and a war photographer for Harper's Weekly during the Spanish–American War, assigned to report and photograph the American campaigns in Cuba and Puerto Rico.

He was a war correspondent for the New York Herald during the Russo-Japanese War (1904–1905).

== Personal life ==
William Dinwiddie was twice married. In 1891 he married Mary E Towers, daughter of Chatham Moore Towers and Sallie Lewis Nuckolls. They were the parents of two children: Dorothy and Redfield Towers Dinwiddie. In 1901 he married Caroline Miller Brooke, daughter of William S Brooke and Mary Shoemaker Hallowell.

== Selected works ==
- War Sketches in Truth
- Our New Possessions
- The War in the Philippines
- The War in South Africa
- Puerto Rico: Its Conditions & Possibilities
