= William Maxwell (journalist) =

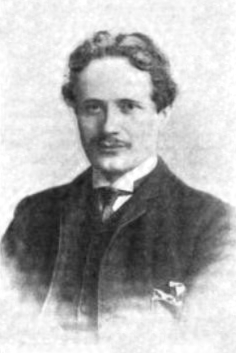
- In The Sketch, 12 February 1902
- Born: 1860; Workington, England
- Died: 23 December 1928 (aged 67–68); Wraysbury, England
- Occupations: Journalist, soldier, writer, civil servant
- Spouse: Clara Hardy (m. 1886)

Sir William Maxwell KBE (1860 – 23 December 1928) was a British journalist, soldier, writer and civil servant.

== Early life ==
Maxwell was born in 1860 (Note: The 1861 Census on 7 April 1861 lists him as four months old, his birth was registered in Cockermouth in the fourth quarter of 1860) in Workington, Cumberland of Irish-born parents William and Mary Maxwell. His father was an insurance agent. Maxwell was described in 1881 as a "Reporter on Newspaper".

He married Clara Hardy, daughter of Adam Hall Hardy, of Buttershaw, Bradford, on 15 June 1886, at St Pauls Church, Buttershaw.

== War correspondent ==
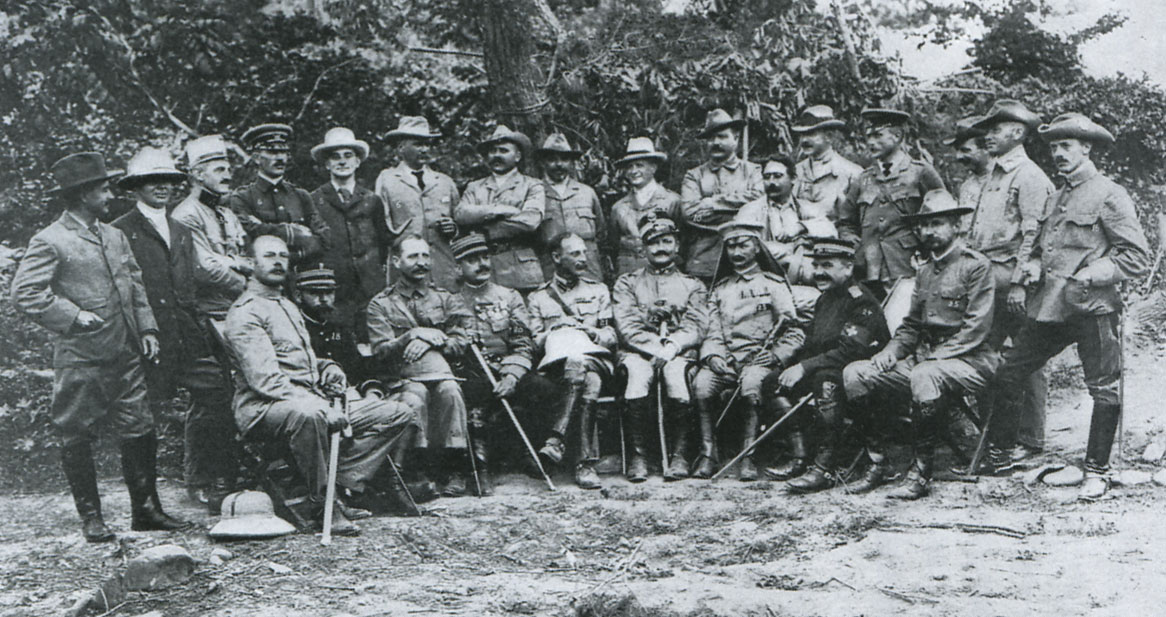
Western military attachés and war correspondents with the Japanese forces after the Battle of Shaho (1904): 1. Robert Collins; 2. David Fraser; 3. Capt. Francois Dhani; 4. Capt. James Jardine; 5. Frederick McKenzie; 6. Edward Knight; 7. Charles Victor-Thomas; 8. Oscar Davis; 9. William Maxwell; 10. Robert MacHugh; 11. William Dinwiddie; 12. Frederick Palmer; 13. Capt. Berkeley Vincent; 14. John Bass; 15. Martin Donohoe; 16. Capt. ____; 17. Capt. Carl von Hoffman; 18. ____; 19. ____; 20. ____; 21. Gen. Sir Ian Hamilton; 22. ____; 23. ____; 24. ____; 25. ____.

Maxwell was a war correspondent for the London Standard, covering the Anglo-Egyptian victory at Battle of Omdurman (1898).

He forwarded reports to London from South Africa throughout the Second Boer War (1899–1902). He survived enteric fever and reported the Siege of Ladysmith. He followed Lord Roberts' campaign from the capture of Bloemfontein through battles at Lydenberg and the Komatipoort.

In 1905, he resigned from the Standard, becoming a foreign correspondent for the London Daily Mail during the Russo-Japanese War (1904–1905).

Prior to the outbreak of the Great War in Europe, he covered the Balkan War (1912).

During the First World War, he reported the First Battle of the Marne (September 1914) for the London Daily Telegraph. Shortly afterwards, he enlisted with the rank of captain and assignment to the general staff.

== Military Censor ==
As the Chief Field Censor on the staff of General Sir Ian Hamilton in the Gallipoli campaign (April–December 1915), Captain Maxwell played a central and crucial role in the unsuccessful attempt to mitigate reports about events unfolding in the Dardanelles and on the Turkish coast in 1915.

Press correspondents at Gallipoli were required to submit all their writing to Captain William Maxwell, whose approval was necessary under regulations drawn up by and enforced by the British Army. Although many later questioned the level of censorship at Gallipoli, most accepted the censorship as an essential element of wartime reporting. Gallipoli's geographic isolation made Maxwell's task was made easier by the isolation of the area that he oversaw. The Gallipoli campaign was fought on the edge of a virtually uninhabited mountain range. The only way to cable messages from Gallipoli was through the official channels.

== Later life ==
After the war Maxwell became a section chief in the Secret Service. He died at "Longfield" his home in Wraysbury on 23 December 1928.

== Selected works ==
- 1902 — With the "Ophir" Round the Empire: An Account of the Tour of the Prince and Princess of Wales, London: Cassell & Co.
- 1906 — From Yalu to Port Arthur, London: Hutchinson & Co. OCLC 2010584
- 1921 — What's Wrong with Your Work?, New York: Trade Press Feature Service, Inc.

== Honours and awards ==
- 1906 — Order of the Rising Sun, Japan.
- 1919 – Knight Commander of the Order of the British Empire
