= John Walter Graham Tulloch =

British soldier and diplomat

Major-General John Tulloch CB
- Born: John Walter Graham Tulloch; 2 November 1861; Sandgate, Kent
- Died: 9 May 1934 (aged 72); Ashtead, Surrey
- Relatives: Surgeon-General John Tulloch MD (father); Colonel Charles John Dennys (brother-in-law)
- Military career
- Allegiance: United Kingdom
- Branch: British Indian Army
- Service years: 1880–1912
- Rank: Major-General
- Commands: Indian Army
- Awards: Companion of the Order of the Bath

Major-General John Walter Graham Tulloch CB (2 November 1861 – 9 May 1934), was a highly-decorated British Army officer, who served with the Indian Army and as a military attaché.

General Tulloch distinguished himself on active service during many campaigns throughout East Africa, Persia, Afghanistan, India and the Far East in the late 19th century.

== Career ==
Of Scottish descent, he was the eldest son of Surgeon-General John Tulloch MD (1830–1906) by his wife Lucy née Cosserat (died 1912). His eldest sister Lucy (who died 1947) married Bengal Staff Corps officer, Colonel Charles John Dennys (1852–1928).

Tulloch was commissioned on 11 August 1880 and entered into the Indian Army on 11 October 1882; he had risen to the rank of major in 1900. In 1901, Colonel Tulloch led a force of Indian troops, Australian marines, and the Imperial Japanese Army at Kaoli-yung in China. In 1905, he was a military attaché posted to the British legation in Tokyo. During this period, he was joined by other officers from other parts of the British Empire, including then-Captains Alexander Bannerman, Berkeley Vincent, Arthur Hart-Synnot. and Herbert Cyril Thacker.

Tulloch was an observer with Japanese forces during the Russo-Japanese War; and his reports were forwarded to London. On 18 October 1907, Tulloch was promoted to the rank of brigadier-general. On 1 May 1908 he was promoted to major-general before retiring on the 1 April 1912.

== Honours ==
- : Officer, Order of the Brilliant Star of Zanzibar, 1896
- : Commander, Order of the Rising Sun, 1904
- : Companion of the Order of the Bath, 1906.

== See also ==
- Military attachés and observers in the Russo-Japanese War
