= Adalbert Dani von Gyarmata und Magyar-Cséke =

Adalbert Dani von Gyarmata
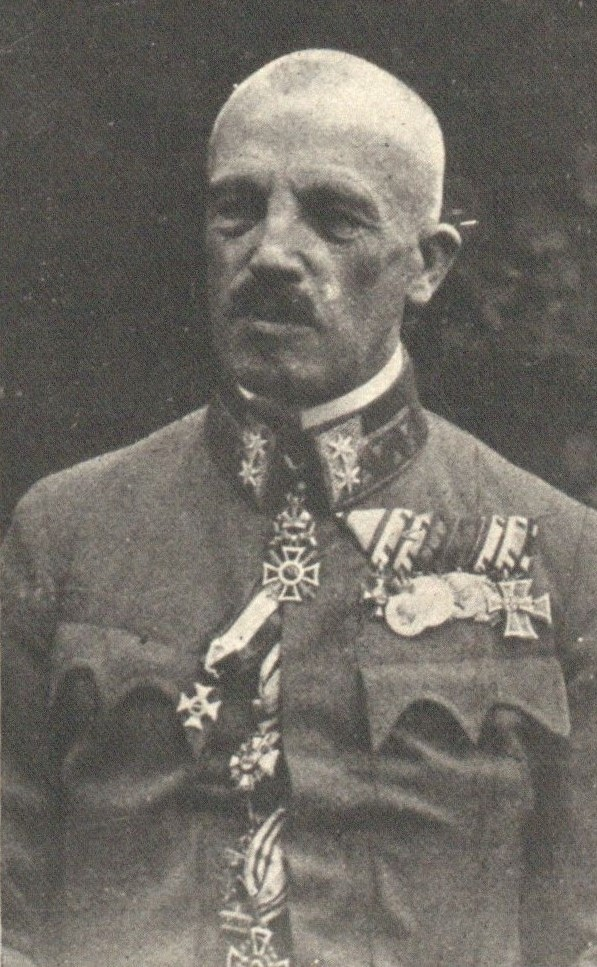
- Adalbert Dani von Gyarmata (May 1918)
- Born: Adalbert Dani von Gyarmata und Magyar-Cséke; May 26, 1868; Pest, Austria-Hungary
- Died: March 21, 1921 (aged 52)
- Other name: Dáni Béla
- Military career
- Allegiance: Austria-Hungary
- Branch: Austro-Hungarian Army
- Service years: 1889–1919
- Rank: Feldmarschall-Leutnant (Lieutenant field marshal) (Note: He was appointed to the rank of Feldmarschall-Leutnant in the reserve of the Royal Hungarian Army, after having held the rank of Generalmajor by the time he retired from Austro-Hungarian service.)
- Conflicts: World War I

Adalbert Dani von Gyarmata und Magyar-Cséke (also sometimes spelled Magyarcseke in Hungarian: Dáni Béla; 21 May 1868 – 14 March 1921) was an officer of the Austro-Hungarian Army who served in World War I, holding a number of senior positions, including chief of staff of VI Corps, Army Group Tersztyanszky, and the 3rd Army. Before the conflict began, he had worked in Russia, China, and Japan as a military attaché, becoming an observer during the Russo-Japanese War. It was during that time that von Gyarmata became acquainted with John Pershing, who went on to command the American Expeditionary Force in Europe during the war.

== Biography ==
Born in Pest in 1868, he was from the Kingdom of Hungary, then a constituent state of the Dual Monarchy. His father had been a judge in a Hungarian royal high court. Adalbert Dani von Gyarmata attended several military schools before being commissioned as an officer of the Austro-Hungarian Army in 1889. He went to Russia to study the Russian language from 1899 until 1900. Afterwards, he served on the 27th Infantry Division command staff as an intelligence officer, also being fluent in German, French, Italian, and English. In February 1904 he was appointed as Austria-Hungary's military attaché in Tokyo. During the Russo-Japanese War of 1904–1905, von Gyarmata traveled with the Imperial Japanese Army as one of the foreign military observers that were present. Among the others was then-Captain John Pershing, future general and commander of American forces in Europe. At some point during the war, Pershing became acquainted with the Austro-Hungarian officer—who was also a captain at the time—and called him "Bela de Dani." After the war, von Gyarmata became the military attaché of Austria-Hungary in the Qing dynasty. He went on to command the 65th Infantry Regiment (1910–12) and when World War I broke out in August 1914, von Gyarmata was a colonel and chief of staff of the IV Corps.

From July 1914 until March 1915, von Gyarmata continued to serve as the IV Corps chief of staff, which was initially deployed to the Balkan theater before being sent to the Eastern Front. From March until September, he served back on the Serbian front as the chief of staff of Army Group Tersztyanszky. In September 1915, von Gyarmata briefly served as the chief of staff of the reconstituted 3rd Army. He became a major general on 3 December 1916 after serving on the Italian Front in command of a mountain brigade. When Austria-Hungary collapsed in 1918, von Gyarmata had been serving as a section chief at the War Ministry in Vienna and briefly commanded the 40th Hungarian Infantry Division. By the time he entered retirement in January 1919, von Gyarmata was a major general and later received the rank of lieutenant field marshal of the reserve in the Royal Hungarian Army.

He died in April 1920.

== Sources ==
=== Literature ===
- Pershing, John J.; Greenwood, John T. (2013). My Life before the World War, 1860–1917: A Memoir. University Press of Kentucky. ISBN 978-0813141978.

Military offices
| Preceded by Position established | Chief of Staff, IV Corps; 1914—1915 | Succeeded by Heinrich von Salis-Samaden |
| Preceded by Position established | Chief of Staff, Army Group Tersztyanszky; 1915 | Succeeded by Position abolished |
| Preceded by Adolf von Boog | Chief of Staff, 3rd Army; 1915 | Succeeded by Theodor Konopicky |
