= Eugen Binder von Krieglstein =

- Born: Styria, Austria-Hungary; July 6, 1873
- Died: September 17, 1914 (aged 41); Sieniawa in Galicia
- Occupations: war correspondent, writer
- Years active: 1897–1914

Eugen Binder von Krieglstein (July 6, 1873 – September 17, 1914) was a journalist, war correspondent and travel writer from the Austro-Hungarian Empire. He sometimes used the pen names of Eugen Krieglstein or Eugen Binder-Krieglstein. In addition to his journalistic work, he also gave lectures about his war experiences illustrated with photographs which we took at the various locations. Von Krieglstein also published numerous travel narratives, and works of fiction, including collections of short-stories and novels.

== Biography ==
Von Krieglstein was born at Castle St. Georgen an der Stiefing in Styria, Austria-Hungary to a family of minor nobility. He attended school in Graz, and graduated from the Infantry Cadet School in Liebenau. After serving for two years in a Rifle Battalion based at the Transylvanian city of Hermann, he was discharged from the Army in 1896 for reasons which are unknown.

From 1897 to 1914, von Krieglstein served as a war correspondent, covering total of 17 battles, revolutions and or expeditions. In 1897 he reported for a Vienna newspaper on the Greco-Turkish War (1897) in Crete. His advocacy for the Turkish led to his arrest by Greek forces, but he was soon released after diplomatic mediation. He then went to work briefly for the press office of the Foreign Ministry of the Ottoman Empire in Constantinople. In 1897/98 he covered the activities of the Venezuelan revolutionary (and future president) Cipriano Castro and the Spanish–American War in 1898. He subsequently covered the Boxer Rebellion in China (1901–1902), after which he published a book: The Battles of the German Expeditionary Force in China (1902). During the Russo-Japanese War of 1904–1905, he was embedded within the Imperial Japanese Army, but was captured by the Russians. At this time, he was a reporter for the Berliner Lokal-Anzeiger (Berlin Local Advertiser).

He remained in Manchuria after the war to cover the Russian Revolution of 1905. However, in 1911/12 he was in Tripoli, Libya to cover the Italo-Turkish War and in 1913/14 was in Mexico City to cover the Mexican Revolution.

At the outbreak of World War I, he returned to Austria and volunteered for service in the army. He was killed in combat in September 1914 in Sieniawa in Galicia where his dragoon regiment was stationed.

== See also ==
- Military attachés and observers in the Russo-Japanese War
