= Adolf von Boog =

- Born: Adolf von Boog; 27 April 1866; Belluno, Kingdom of Italy
- Died: 15 February 1929 (aged 62); Vienna, First Austrian Republic
- Military career
- Allegiance: Austria-Hungary; 1886–1918; German-Austria; 1918–1919
- Branch: Austro-Hungarian Army
- Service years: 1886–1919
- Rank: Feldmarschall-Leutnant (Lieutenant field marshal)
- Commands: 93rd Infantry Division; 25th Infantry Division; 4th Infantry Division; Austrian People's Defense
- Conflicts: World War I: Eastern Front; Italian Front

Adolf von Boog (27 April 1866, Belluno — 15 February 1929, Vienna) was an Austro-Hungarian Army officer who served in World War I, holding senior positions in the General Staff and commanding field units, and later was briefly the commander-in-chief of the Volkswehr ("People's Defense") of the new postwar rump state of Austria.

== Biography ==
Adolf von Boog was born in the city of Belluno in 1866, formerly a possession of the Austrian Empire before it became part of the unified Kingdom of Italy. He spoke fluent German and Italian, along with some Bohemian, Hungarian, and Bosnian. Boog was commissioned as a lieutenant in a heavy artillery battery of the Austro-Hungarian Army in 1886. In 1892, Boog was appointed to the General Staff, where he remained until 1900. He then served in the 31st Infantry Regiment to 1901 before becoming part of the General Staff again, then serving in the 88th Infantry Regiment from 1907 to 1909. Boog became the chief of staff of XV Corps in 1910. In the period from then until 1911, he commanded an infantry regiment before returning to a senior staff position and then going to the War Ministry.

By the time World War I broke out in August 1914, Adolf von Boog was a colonel in command of the 8th Infantry Brigade. He served on the Eastern Front until being appointed as the chief of staff of 3rd Army in September 1914, a post he held until May 1915. Boog then commanded the 93rd Infantry Division on the Italian Front before returning to the east to lead the 25th Infantry Division in September. He would command that unit until May 1918, at which point he briefly served as the commander of the 4th Infantry Division towards the end of the war.

On 7 November 1918, Lieutenant field marshal Adolf von Boog was named supreme commander of the Austrian Volkswehr (People's Defense), the military of the Austrian state after the collapse of the Dual Monarchy. He retired from that position in 1919 and died in Vienna on 15 February 1929.

== Sources ==
=== Books ===
- Dixon, Joe (1985). Defeat and Disarmament: Allied Diplomacy and the Politics of Military Affairs in Austria, 1918-22. University of Delaware Press. ISBN 978-0874132212.

Military offices
Preceded by Position created	Commander, 8th Infantry Brigade; 1914	Succeeded by August Meitzl von Stende
Preceded by Rudolf Pfeffer	Chief of Staff, 3rd Army; 1914—1915	Succeeded by Adalbert Dani von Gyarmata
Preceded by Position created	Commander, 93rd Infantry Division; 1915	Succeeded by Position abolished
Preceded by Josef Poleschensky von Marienbrand	Commander, 25th Infantry Division; 1915–1918	Succeeded by Emanuel Werz von Ostenkampf
Preceded by Rudolf Pfeffer	Commander, 4th Infantry Division; 1918	Succeeded by Karl Haas
Preceded by Hermann Kövess von Kövessháza (Austro-Hungarian Army)	Supreme Commander, Volkswehr; 1918–1919	Succeeded by Rudolf Vidossich (from 1922)
