= The Cruise of the Alerte =

1891 travel narrative by Edward Frederick Knight

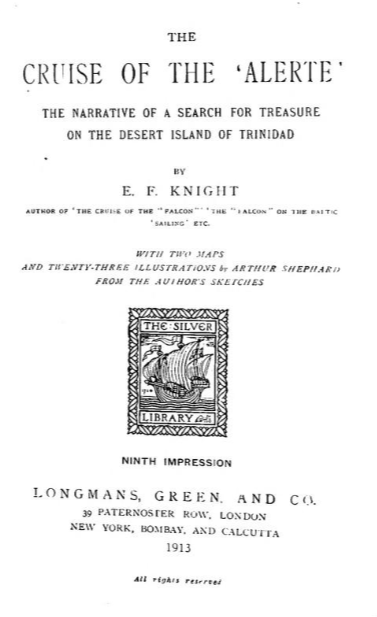
- Title page for The Cruise of the Alerte: The Narrative of a Search for Treasure on the Desert Island of Trinidad (1913)
- Author: Edward Frederick Knight
- Genre: Travel
- Publication date: 1890

The Cruise of the Alerte: The Narrative of a Search for Treasure on the Desert Island of Trinidad (1890) is a travel narrative by Edward Frederick Knight. In 1889, Knight sailed to Trindade in a 64-foot yawl named the Alerte.

At the time, it was the only detailed written account of the island.

Arthur Ransome used the descriptions from Knight's book as a basis for the geographical features of Crab Island in his book Peter Duck, except that he set the island further north in the Caribbean Sea.
