= Where Three Empires Meet =

1893 book by Edward Frederick Knight

Where Three Empires Meet: A Narrative of Recent Travel in Kashmir, Western Tibet, Gilgit, and the Adjoining Countries
- Editor: J.C. Allen
- Author: Edward Frederick Knight
- Language: English
- Subject: Travel literature
- Genre: Nonfiction
- Published: 1893 (1st Edition)
- Publisher: Longmans, Green & Co., London
- Media type: Hardcover
- Pages: 528

Where Three Empires Meet: A Narrative of Recent Travel in Kashmir, Western Tibet, Gilgit, and the Adjoining Countries is a travel memoir written by Edward Frederick Knight, a British Raj military officer.

== Background ==
In 1890, Knight made trips to Kashmir and the Himalayas to gather research for his book, Where Three Empires Meet. He started his journey in Ladakh and continued to Gilgit. He made it to Gilgit in time to join the fight in 1891 when the British forces led by Colonel Algernon Durand began a military campaign against the smaller states of Hunza and Nagar. He also served as a correspondent for The Times during this time. In addition, he was temporarily appointed as an officer-in-charge of some native troops.

A scanned copy of the book is available in Wikimedia Commons and the rare books section of the Government of India's Indian Culture portal.

== Gallery ==
Few illustrations from the book
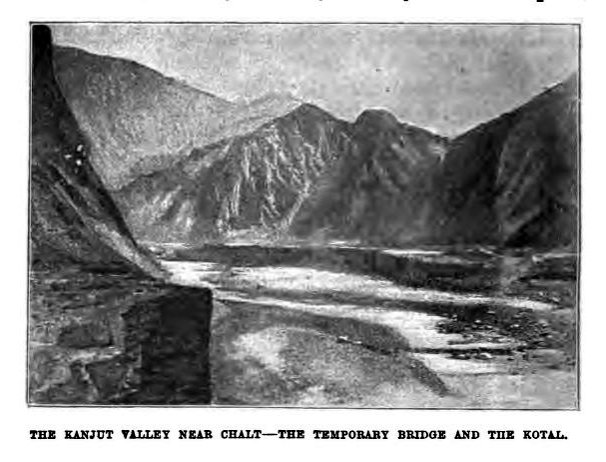
A view of the Kanjut / Hunza river as illustrated in E.F. Knight's "Where Three Empires Meet," published in 1905, 2nd Edition.

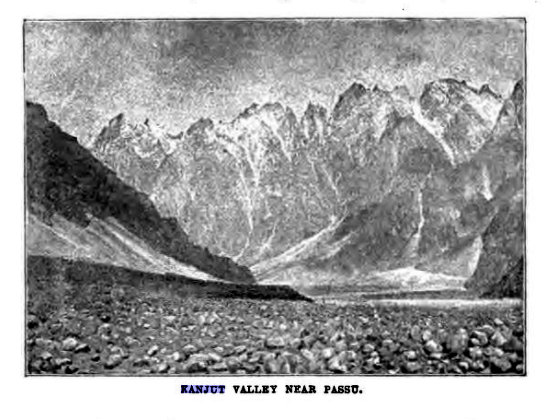
An illustration of the Kanjut valley in E.F. Knight's "Where Three Empires Meet," published in 1905, 2nd Edition.

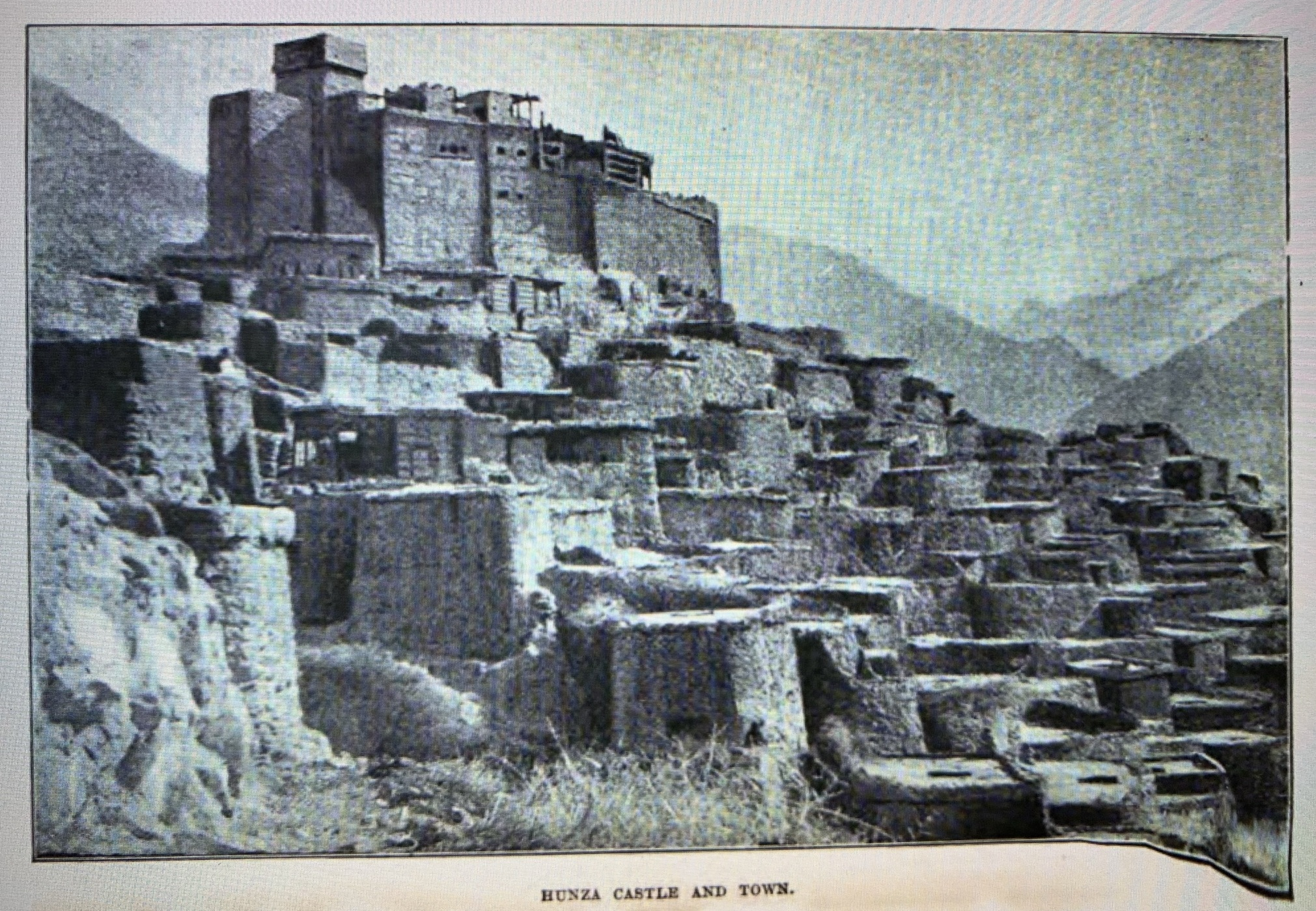
A view of Baltit Fort in Hunza valley, as published in "Where Three Empires Meet" by E.F. Knight in 1905, 2nd Edition.
