= Louis Livingston Seaman =

American surgeon

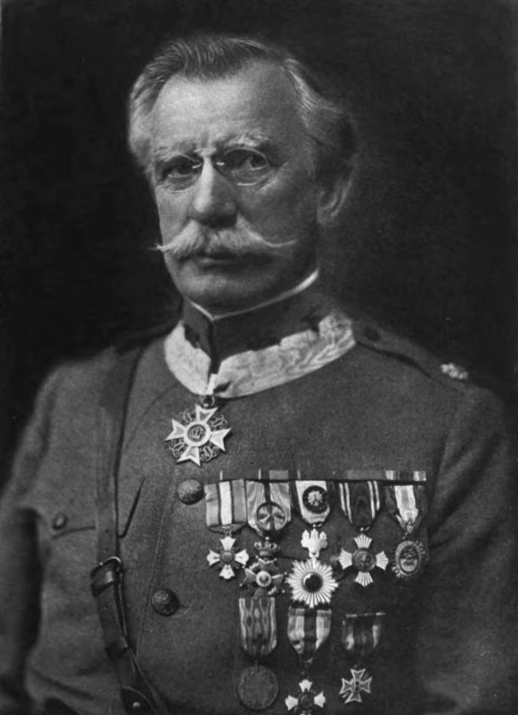
- Born: October 17, 1851; Newburgh, New York
- Died: January 31, 1932 (aged 80); Bronxville, New York
- Education: Cornell University; Jefferson Medical College
- Occupation: Surgeon

Signature
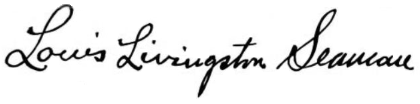

Louis Livingston Seaman, FRGS (October 17, 1851 – January 31, 1932) was an American surgeon who served in the United States Army, and a writer of many works. He was born in Newburgh, New York.

== Biography ==
After earning an undergraduate degree from Cornell University in 1872, he graduated from Jefferson Medical College of Philadelphia, Pennsylvania in 1876 and from University Medical College, New York City in 1877. He became connected with several hospitals in New York City. Seaman made a tour around the world in 1886.

During the Spanish–American War, he served as surgeon of the First Regiment, United States Volunteer Engineers, in time attaining the rank of major. He was among the military attachés and observers in the Russo-Japanese War in Manchuria. Seaman also personally met Li Hongzhang and Zhang Zuolin.

At the outset of World War I in 1914 he offered his services to the Belgian army and reported as a Red Cross surgeon.

He died at Lawrence Hospital in Bronxville, New York on January 31, 1932.

== Works ==
His writings include:

- Rules for the Government of the School for Nurses at Charity Hospital, Blackwell's Island (1881)
- The Social Waste of a Great City: A Paper Read Before the American Association for the Advancement of Science at Its Annual Meeting in Buffalo, August 20, 1886 (1886)
- The U.S. army ration and its adaptability for use in tropical climates: a paper read before the New York Academy of Medicine at its stated meeting, February 2, 1899 (1899)
- Observations in China and the Tropics on the Army Ration and the ... (1901)
- Native Troops for Our Colonial Possessions (1901)
- Why the Army Canteen Should be Restored (1903)
- Shall disease triumph in our army? (1904)
- Shall Disease Triumph in Our Army?: Extracts from a Volume Entitled, "From Tokio Through Manchuria with the Japanese" [and from "The Real Triumph of Japan"]. (1904)
- Daniel Claus' narrative of his relations with Sir William Johnson and experiences in the Lake George fight: Lake George Celebration Executive Committee report. Native troops in our colonial possessions (1904)
- Observations on the Medical Features of the Russo-Japanese War: Address of Maj. Louis L. Seaman Before the International Congress of Military Surgeons, October 12, 1904 (1904)
- From Tokio through Manchuria with the Japanese (1905)
- From Tokio Through Manchuria with the Japanese, by Louis Livingston Seaman,... (1905)
- From Tokio through Manchuria with the Japanese (1905)
- Observations in the Russo-Japanese War (1905)
- A Portable Ration for Soldiers in Battle and on the March (1906)
- The Real Triumph of Japan (the Conquest of the Silent Foe), by Louis Livingston Seaman,... (1906)
- The real triumph of Japan: the conquest of the silent foe (1908)
- Some of the Triumphs of Scientific Medicine in Peace and War in ... (1908)
- The Tse-Tse Fly and Sleeping Sickness (1908)
- The sleeping sickness (1910)
- Should the Panama Canal be Fortified? (1911)
- Fair Play for the Republic of China: Speech Delivered Under the Auspices of the Committee on National Affairs of the Republican Club of the City of New York, 1912 (1912)
- Alcohol a Menace to the Soldier: And the Privilege of the Post ... (1912)
- The Restoration of the Army Canteen: A Moral and Sanitary Necessity (1912)
- The aftermath of the Balkan war (1913)
- The Holier Than Thou Policy of the President: Presented at the Session of the Academy of Political and Social Science, Philadelphia 1916 (1916)
- Report of Dr. Louis Livingston Seaman, President of the British War Relief Association ... to the Members of the British War Relief Association on His Return from His Second Visit to the War Zone, October 23d, 1916 (1916)
- Report to the Members of The British War Relief Association, Inc., on His Return from His Second Visit to the War Zone, October 23, 1916 (1916)
- Report... to the Members of the British War Relief Association, on ... (1916)
- Report ... to the Members of the British War Relief Association: On His Return from His Second Visit to the War Zone October 23, 1916 (1916)
- Address on Germany's Deportation of the Innocent People of Belgium and Northern France: By Major Louis Livingston Seaman, U.S.V. and Resolutions Unanimously Adopted by the Congregation of the Church of St. John the Evangilist [sic] Protestant Episcopal. Rev. John A. Wade, Rector, Sunday, December 10, 1916 (1916)
- Report to the British War Relief Association, Inc: On His Return from His Second Visit to the War Zone October 23, 1916 (1916)
- The Crucifixion of Belgium: An Address on Germanys' Deportation of the Innocent People of Belgium and Northern France at the Church of St. John the Evangelist, Protestant Episcopal (1917)
- Lincoln on Preparedness: An Address by Major Louis Livingston Seaman at the Celebration of Lincoln's Birthday and the Twentieth Anniversary of the Lincoln Memorial University, February 12, 1917, Cumberland Gap, Tennessee (1917)
- Dr. Seaman on Preparedness: Speech of Hon. Frederick C. Hicks, of Long Island, in the House of Representatives, Friday, March 2, 1917 (1917)
- The Prevention of Disease in the War: More Power for the Medical Department of the Army (1918)
- The Owendyer Bills for Increased Rank of Medical Officers (1918)
- Shall the treaty of peace be one of justice or one of infamy? (1919)
- Shall the Treaty of Peace be One of Justice Or of Infamy?. (1919)
- The Hope of the Philippines (191?)
- The Prevention of Disease in the War. More Power for the Medical Departement of the Army.... (19??)
- From Tokyo Through Manchuria with the Japanese (1950)
