= Lieutenant field marshal =

Historic European military rank

Lieutenant field marshal, also frequently historically field marshal lieutenant (German: Feldmarschall-Leutnant, formerly Feldmarschallleutnant, historically also Feldmarschall-Lieutenant and, in official Imperial and Royal Austrian army documents from 1867 always Feldmarschalleutnant, abbreviated FML), was a senior army rank in certain European armies of the 17th to 20th centuries. It emerged as the rank of field marshal (German: Feldmarschall) came to be used for the highest army commander in the 17th century (having originally been the equivalent of a cavalry colonel). In German-speaking countries the commander-in-chief usually appointed an "under marshal" (Untermarschall) or "lieutenant field marshal" to support and represent the field marshal. Amongst his functions as the personal deputy to the field marshal, were the supervision of supply depots and routes, and inspection of the guards.

== Austria ==
Lieutenant field marshal Feldmarschall-Leutnant
- Gorget patch
- Country: Austria-Hungary
- Service branch: Austro-Hungarian Army
- Rank group: General officer
- Rank: Two-star
- Formation: 17th century
- Abolished: 1938
- Next higher rank: General der Waffengattung
- Next lower rank: Generalmajor
- Equivalent ranks: Vizeadmiral

It was introduced to the Army of the Austrian Empire in the period 1804 to 1866, and the Austro-Hungarian Army from 1867 to 1918, where it was the second highest general rank after the various generals of the branch – the general of infantry, cavalry and artillery – until the introduction of the rank of colonel general in 1915. On the re-introduction of the rank of field marshal, it fell back to third place in terms of seniority.

Prince Montecuccoli, a field marshal himself in the Habsburg army of the mid 17th century gives the order of precedence in the Imperial Army as follows:

- Feldhauptmann (commander-in-chief)
- General-Lieutenant or Feldhauptmann Lieutenant (lieutenant general)
- Feldmarschall (field marshal)
- General der Kavallerie and General der Artillerie (general of cavalry and general of artillery)
- Felmarschall-Lieutenant (field marshal lieutenant)
- General-Feldwachtmeister (major general)

In 1789, for example, the Emperor conferred the rank of "Lieutenant Field Marshal on the Major Generals Count de Harrach, Baron d'Alvinzi, Prince Christian de Waldeck, Baron de Levenehr and Baron de Wallisch..."

Subsequently, the order of precedence of general ranks in the Austro-Hungarian Army was as follows:

- Feldmarschall - Tárbornagy (field marshal)
- Generaloberst - Vezérezredes, introduced in 1915 (colonel general)
- General der Infanterie - Gyalogsági Tábornok, General der Kavallerie - Lovassági Tábornok and Feldzeugmeister - Táborszernagy (general of infantry, general of cavalry and general of artillery)
- Feldmarschall-Leutnant - Altábornagy (field marshal lieutenant)
- Generalmajor - Vezérőrnagy (major general)

At that time, a field marshal lieutenant of the k.u.k. Army was equivalent to the Generalleutnant (lieutenant general) of the Prussian Army (today comparable to an OF7, major general or two-star rank). The normal assignment of a lieutenant field marshal was command of a division-sized formation. He was addressed by the honorific title of "excellency".

In Austria the rank continued to be used after 1918 by the commander-in-chief (FML Adolf von Boog) of the so-called Volkswehr (People's Defence) until 1919. However, the Bundesheer of the First Republic adopted the designation, structure and sequence of the German ranks in 1920. In 1933, following national tradition, Austrian ranks, insignia and uniforms were reintroduced, including lieutenant field marshal. These ranks remained in use until the Anschluss in 1938.

== Denmark ==
The rank of Lieutenant field marshal (Danish: Feltmarskal Lieutenant) was codified on 25 May 1671, by King Christian V, with the publication of the Danish order of precedence. Here the rank of Lieutenant field marshal was placed above the rank of general, and below the position of Quartermaster general (Danish: General Feldt-Tøymester).

== Hungary ==
Lieutenant field marshal Altábornagy
- Country: Hungary
- Rank group: General officer
- Rank: Lieutenant general
- NATO rank code: OF-8
- Next higher rank: Colonel general
- Next lower rank: Major general

During the time of the Austro-Hungarian Army, the rank of Lieutenant field marshal was called Altábornagy (in Hungarian). The rank is still used by the Hungarian Defence Forces.

== See also ==
- List of lieutenant field marshals of the Holy Roman Empire
- Ranks in the Austro-Hungarian Navy
- Rank insignias of the Austro-Hungarian armed forces

== Literature ==
- danmarkshistorien.dk (17 May 2017). "Rangforordningen, 25. maj 1671" (in Danish). danmarkshistorien.dk. Archived from the original on 20 October 2020.
- Georg von Alten: Handbuch für Heer und Flotte. Vol. III, Berlin, 1911
- Constantin von Wurzbach: Biographisches Lexikon des Kaiserthums Österreich, 60 vols., Vienna, 1856–1891
- Allgemeine Deutsche Biographie, 56 vols., Munich-Leipzig, 1875–1912
- Österreichisches Biographisches Lexikon 1815-1950, hitherto 12 volumes, Vienna,1957 ff.
- Neue Österreichische Biographie (ab Band 10: Grosse Österreicher), hitherto 21 volumes, Vienna, 1935–1982
- Felix Czeike: Historisches Lexikon Wien, 5 vols., Vienna, 1992–1997
- Antonio Schmidt-Brentano: Kaiserliche und k.k. Generale 1618-1815, Austrian State Archives
- Antonio Schmidt-Brentano: Die k.k. bzw. k.u.k. Generalität 1816-1918, Austrian State Archives
- Adjustierungsvorschrift für die k.u.k. gemeinsame Armee, die k.k. Landwehr, die k.u. Landwehr, die verbundenen Einrichtungen und das Corps der Militär-Beamten. complete works Vienna/Bozen, 1912
