= James Bruce Jardine =

British Army officer and diplomat (1870–1955)

Brigadier-General James Bruce Jardine CMG DSO DL
- Born: 1870; Edinburgh, Scotland
- Died: 17 March 1955 (aged 84–85) Chesterknowes, Scotland
- Allegiance: United Kingdom
- Branch: 5th Lancers
- Service years: 1890–1919
- Rank: Brigadier-General
- Awards: CMG, DSO
- Other work: Deputy Lieutenant of Roxburghshire

Brigadier-General James Bruce Jardine CMG DSO DL (1870 – 17 March 1955) was a British Army officer and diplomat.

== Family life ==
James Bruce Jardine was born in Edinburgh in 1870, and named after the explorer James Bruce who was a maternal ancestor. Jardine was educated at Charterhouse School and the Royal Military College, Sandhurst. In December 1908, he married Agnes Sara Hargreaves Brown, the daughter of Sir Alexander Brown, 1st Baronet.

== Military career ==
Jardine was commissioned into the 1st King's Dragoon Guards in March 1890 before transferring to the 5th Royal Irish Lancers.

He saw active service in the Second Boer War, including the Siege of Ladysmith and the Gun Hill sortie on the night of 7/8 December 1899. As Lieutenant Jardine, he was awarded the Distinguished Service Order (DSO) on 29 November 1900, for his actions in South Africa.

Jardine was subsequently promoted to captain and, in January 1904, he was one of a group of British military officers recently posted as military attachés to the British legation in Tokyo. His colleagues included Captain Alexander Bannerman, Captain Berkeley Vincent, and Captain Arthur Hart-Synnot. They had been sent to study the Japanese language but, on 2 January, Jardine stated: "After all, we have come out for this war only". He and his superiors had anticipated the onset of the Russo-Japanese War.

When the First World War began, Jardine held the rank of Major. He commanded the 97th Brigade of the 32nd Division during the Battle of the Somme in 1916.

In later life, Jardine was named deputy lieutenant (DL) of Roxburghshire, and from 1952 an ensign in the Royal Company of Archers.

== Honours and awards ==
- CMG : Companion of the Order of St Michael and St George (1917).
- DSO : Companion of the Distinguished Service Order (29 November 1900), for services during the Second Boer War in South Africa.
- Japanese Order of the Sacred Treasure (1905).

== See also ==
- Military attachés and observers in the Russo-Japanese War
