= Arthur Henry Seton Hart-Synnot =

British Army general (1870–1942)

Brigadier-General Arthur Henry Seton Hart-Synnot CMG DSO* FRGS
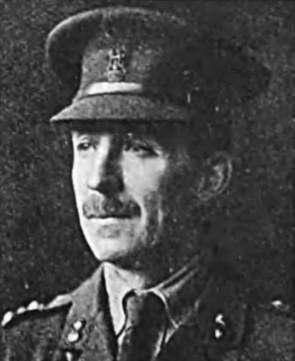
- Born: 19 July 1870; Ballymoyer House, Whitecross, County Armagh, Ireland
- Died: 1942 (aged 72)
- Military career
- Allegiance: United Kingdom
- Branch: British Army
- Service years: 1889–1920
- Rank: Brigadier-General
- Unit: East Surrey Regiment
- Conflicts: Second Boer War; World War I
- Awards: Companion of the Order of St Michael and St George (CMG); Companion of the Distinguished Service Order and Bar (DSO & Bar); Order of the Sacred Treasure, 4th Class; Knight of the Legion of Honour; French Cross of War (1914-1918)

Brigadier-General Arthur Henry Seton Hart-Synnot, CMG, DSO*, FRGS (1870–1942) was a British Army general who saw service in the South African War; then in Japan, Hong Kong, Burma, and India; and finally in France in the First World War.

== Early life ==
Born at Ballymoyer House between Whitecross and Newtownhamilton in County Armagh, Hart-Synnot was from a family with a history of military service. His father was Major General Arthur FitzRoy Hart-Synnot and his uncle, Sir Reginald Hart, was awarded the Victoria Cross in Afghanistan. He was educated at Clifton College, King William's College, Isle of Man and the Royal Military College at Sandhurst. He took the added surname of Hart-Synnot (in lieu of Hart) in 1902.

== Military career ==
After passing out from the Royal Military College, Hart-Synnot (then Hart) was commissioned into the East Surrey Regiment as a second lieutenant on 8 October 1890. He was promoted to lieutenant on 7 June 1892, and served with the Chitral Relief Force under Sir Robert Low in 1895 in command of the Maxim gun detachment of the 1st Battalion, East Surrey Regiment, (medal with clasp). Two years later, he served in the Tirah campaign on the North West Frontier of India under Sir William Lockhart in 1897 as Orderly Officer to the Brigadier General commanding the 1st Brigade Tirah Expeditionary Force. He relinquished the appointment of adjutant on 1 January 1898. Promotion to captain followed on 21 June 1899. He attended the Staff College, Camberley, from 1898 to 1899, earning his psc.

Hart served in the Second Boer War from late 1899, first in command of the Northern Company of Mounted Infantry, being present during all the operations about Naawpoort and Colesberg with French's Cavalry Division (for which he was mentioned in despatches). He commanded the company in the relief of Kimberley (15 February 1900) and in the advance on Bloemfontein, including the battle of Paardeberg during which he was wounded, the engagements at Driefontein, Poplar Grove, and Klip Drift, and in the subsequent occupation of Bloemfontein and operations east of that city about Thabanchu. In summer 1900 he served with Hamilton's Force in command of the Northern Company of Mounted Infantry and afterwards as Staff Officer of Legge's Corps of Mounted Infantry during the advance to Pretoria and the following capture of Johannesburg and Pretoria. He took part in the Battle of Diamond Hill (June 1900), and as staff officer of Mounted Infantry in the march to Betlehem and Vredefort, following which he served as brigade major of the Irish brigade with Lord Kitchener's column in pursuit of Boer general Christiaan de Wet.

Following the end of the war in June 1902, Hart returned to the United Kingdom on the SS Soudan, arriving at Southampton in early September. His career then took the staff path, when he was seconded as an Aide-de-Camp to his uncle from December 1902 until November 1903.

In 1904 he was posted to Japan, and between 1907 and 1911 served in Hong Kong. He was promoted major on 17 March 1909. After a tour in Burma with his regiment (1911–13), he was appointed general staff officer grade 2 (GSO2) at GHQ India on 27 October 1913, where he remained until October 1916, when he returned to Britain.

The Great War was now convulsing Europe, and Hart-Synnot was deployed to France on New Year's Day 1917. Previously brevetted to lieutenant-colonel, he was promoted to lieutenant-colonel on 17 January 1917. He again served as a GSO2 with the 17th and 40th Divisions. He became a temporary Brigadier-General when he was appointed to command 6th Infantry Brigade on 28 April 1918, where he was severely wounded, losing both legs. In the 1918 King's Birthday Honours he was awarded a Bar to his DSO. The following year, he was appointed a Companion of the Order of St. Michael and St. George (CMG) in a special addition to the 1919 Birthday Honours. He was also made a Chevalier of the Légion d'Honneur, and awarded the French Croix de Guerre. He was placed on the half-pay list and retired as an honorary brigadier-general in 1920 as a result of these wounds.

== Personal life ==
While a military observer in Japan during the Russo-Japanese War, Hart-Synnot began an extended love affair with a Japanese woman, Suzuki Masa (1878–1965), by whom he had two sons, Suzuki Kiyoshi (1906–1945) and Suzuki Hideo (1911–1915). In the 1980s, approximately 800 letters were discovered in Japan, addressed to Suzuki Masa from Hart-Synnot. This correspondence was the subject of a 2006 biography, Falling Blossom by Peter Pagnamenta and Momoko Williams published by Century.

In 1919, Hart-Synnot married a nurse, Violet Drower (1886–1969), whom he met while convalescing from his wounds. The couple had no children.

== See also ==
- Military attachés and observers in the Russo-Japanese War
