= Charles Victor-Thomas =

French military officer, journalist, and author

Charles Victor-Thomas (1871–1908) was a French military officer, a journalist and an author, known for his writing as a war correspondent during the Russo-Japanese War.

In 1904, Captain Victor-Thomas was permitted to Join General Kuroki's Japanese First Army. His own military background in the French army informed his perspective and his writing. He was a reporter for Le Gaulois and Le Temps, both of which were published in Paris.

== Selected works ==
Victor-Thomas's published writings encompass 3 works in 4 publications in 1 language and 16 library holdings.

- 1905 — Trois mois avec Kuroki. Notes d'un correspondant de guerre français attaché à la lre armée japonaise. Paris: A. Challamel. OCLC 077102298
- 1902 — Amériques & Américains. Paris: A. Challamel. OCLC 003105987

== See also ==
- Military attachés and observers in the Russo-Japanese War
