= Frederick Palmer (journalist) =

American novelist and journalist

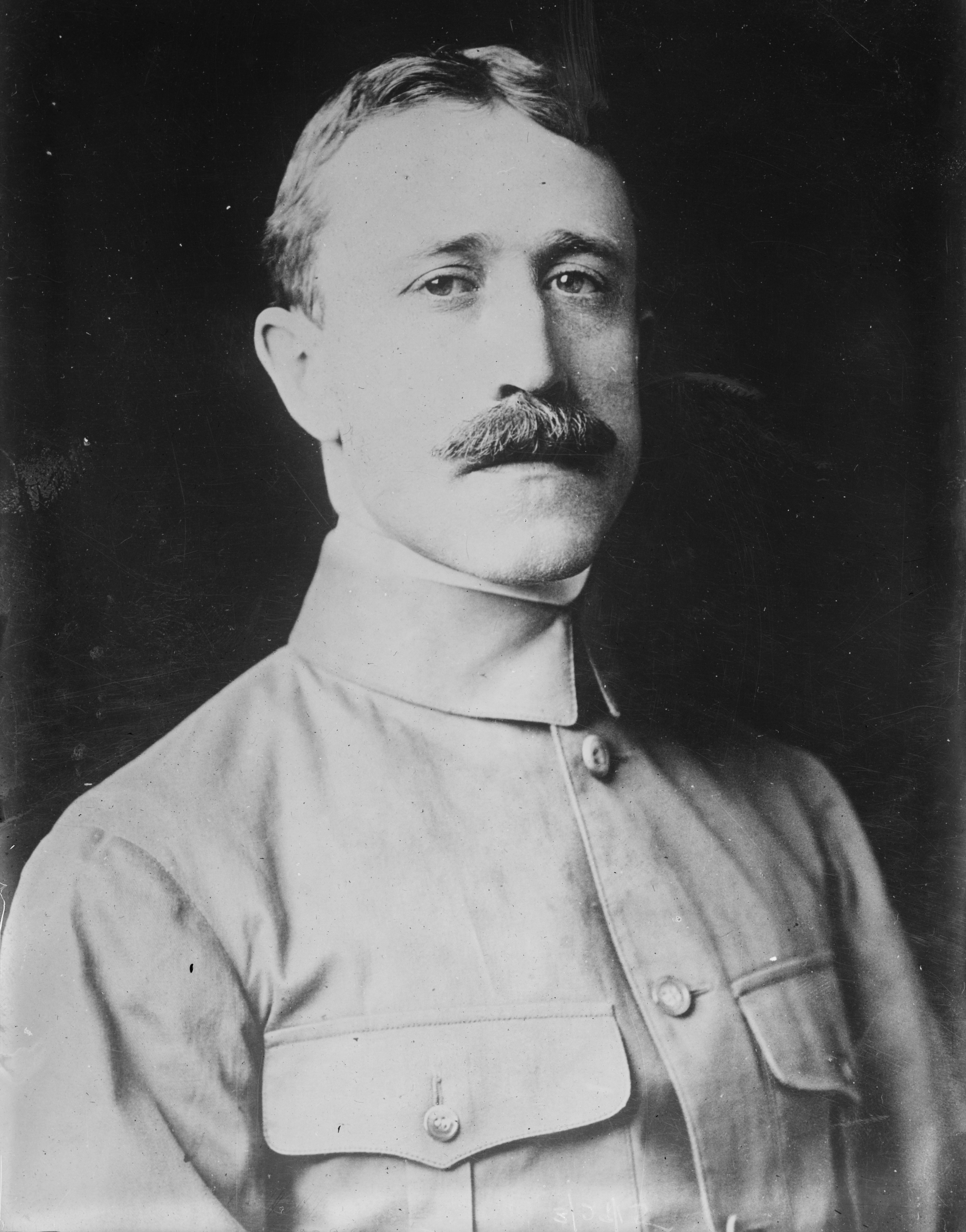
Palmer, c. 1913

Frederick Palmer (January 29, 1873 – September 2, 1958) was an American journalist and writer.

== Biography ==
Born in Pleasantville, Pennsylvania, Palmer attended Allegheny College in Meadville, Pennsylvania. He was the son of Amos F. Palmer; in February 1896, he married Elsie M. Wither.

The New York Press hired Palmer in 1895 as its London correspondent; and this opportunity evolved into a long career.

=== War correspondent ===
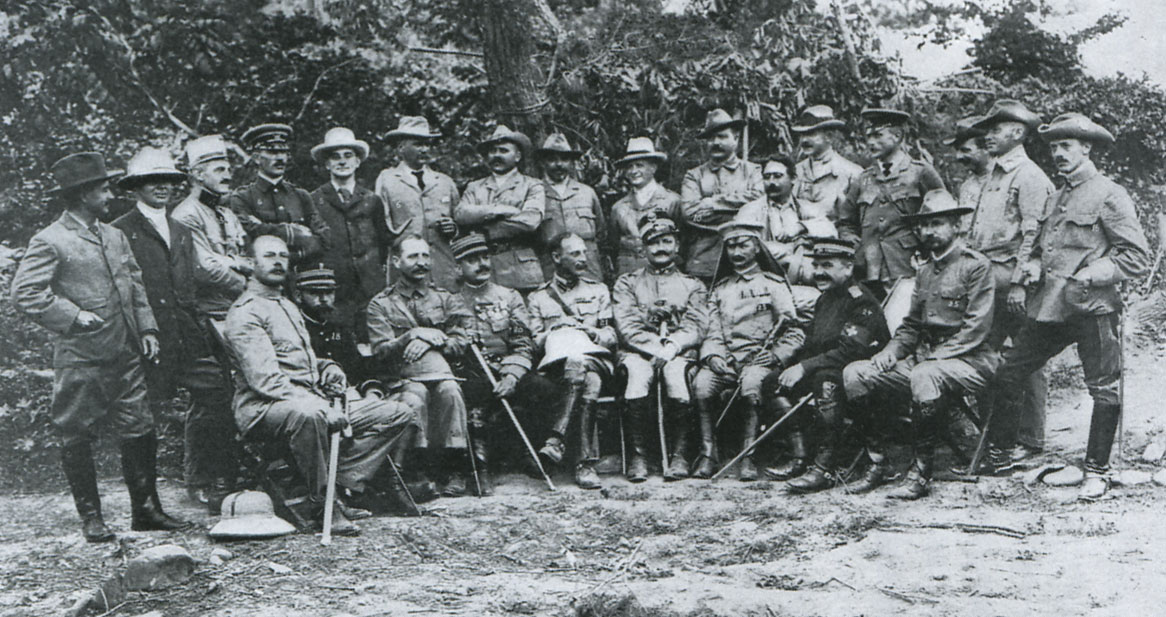
Palmer (back row, fourth from left) with Western military attachés and war correspondents after the Battle of Shaho (1904)

Palmer's 50 years as a war correspondent began when he was sent to cover the Greco-Turkish War of 1897 for the New York World and for Collier's magazine. He then covered the gold rush in northwestern Canada. The Philippine–American War (1899–1902) provided an opportunity for him to cross the Pacific bound for Manila.

In 1900, Palmer went to China to cover the Boxer Rebellion (1900); and then he was sent to cover the Boer War (1899–1902) in South Africa. Then the prospect of military conflict in Manchuria brought him back to China to cover the Russo-Japanese War (1904–1905) for the New York Globe.

The New York Times sent Palmer to cover the Balkan War in 1912.

In 1914, Palmer was arrested in Mexico City while covering the Tampico Affair (1914) and the United States occupation of Veracruz for Everybody's Magazine.

=== World Wars ===
General John Pershing persuaded him to take on the task of press accreditation for the American Expeditionary Force (AEF). In this period, he was accorded the rank of Colonel. Palmer subsequently became the first war correspondent to win the U.S. Army's Distinguished Service Medal.

Between World War I and World War II, Palmer wrote thirty-one books, including Our Greatest Battle, based on his World War I experiences. In his books, he provided an analysis of the future impact of weapons and strategies he had seen, and soon after the end of World War I predicted that a second world war was on the horizon. He was awarded an honorary doctorate from Princeton University in 1935.

Palmer also wrote for the North American Newspaper Alliance in World War II, submitting from London and then Paris at least through April 1945.

== Select works ==
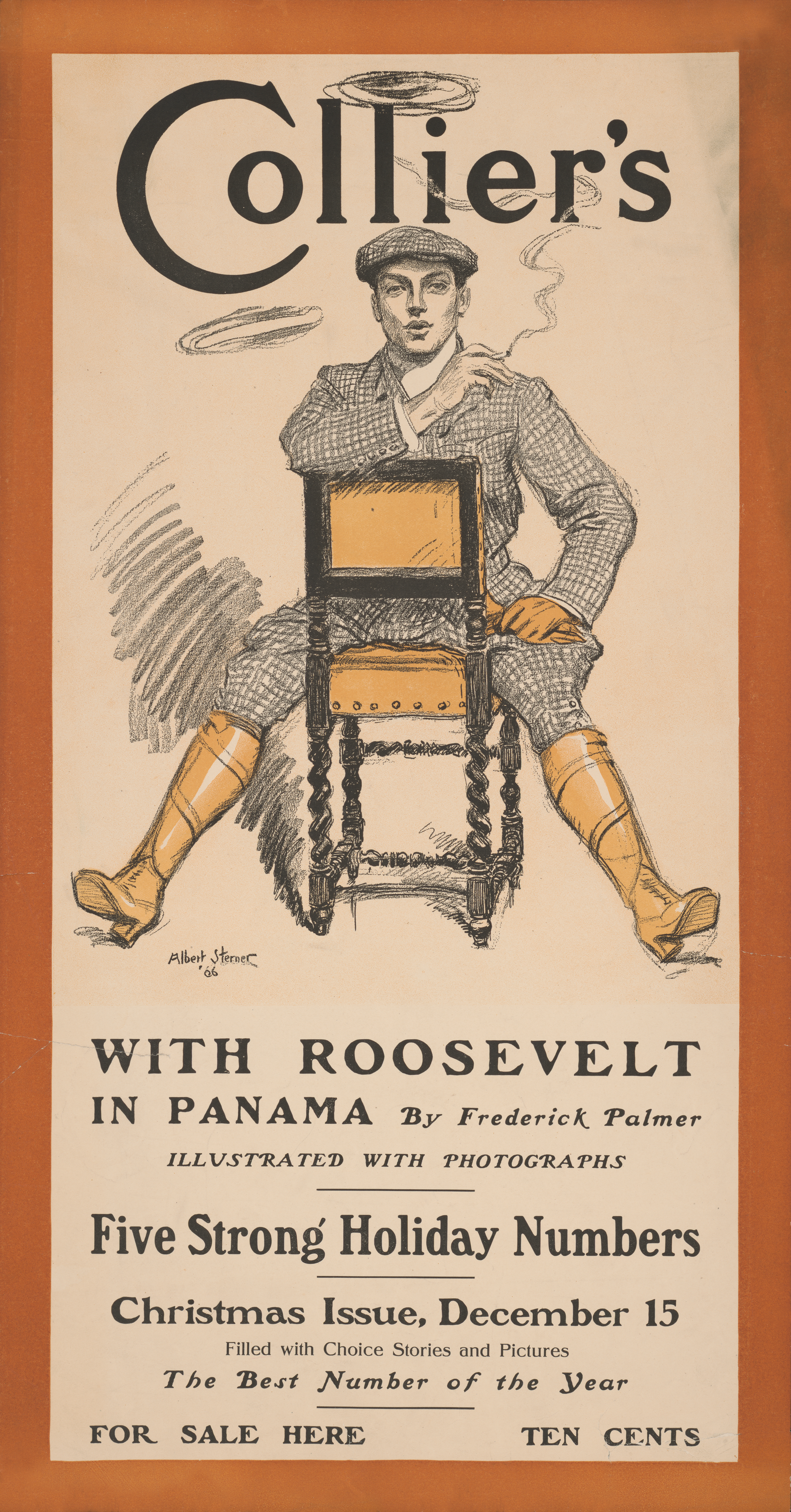
Collier's poster featuring Palmer's series of articles on Panama (1906)

- 1897: Going to War in Greece
- 1899: In the Klondyke
- 1901: The Ways of the Service
- 1904: With Kuroki in Manchuria
- 1906: Lucy of the Stars, novel.
- 1910: The Big Fellow, novel
- 1910: Danbury Rodd: Aviator, novel
- 1910: The Vagabond, novel
- 1912: Over the Pass, Western novel
- 1914: The Last Shot, novel about a fictional major European war from the point of view of a small set of soldiers and civilians, written before the start of World War I
- 1916: My Year of the War, Palmer's account of his experiences as a journalist, starting the day World War I was declared
- 1917: My Second Year of the War, Palmer's account of his second year as a World War I war correspondent
- 1919: Our Greatest Battle, about the Meuse-Argonne
- 1921: The Folly of Nations, tracing the causes of wars in general
- 1933: With My Own Eyes, autobiography
- 1934: Bliss, Peacemaker; the Life and Letters of General Tasker Howard Bliss, the only biography of the first American 'soldier-statesman" of the 20th century
