= Frederick Arthur MacKenzie =

Canadian journalist (1869–1931)

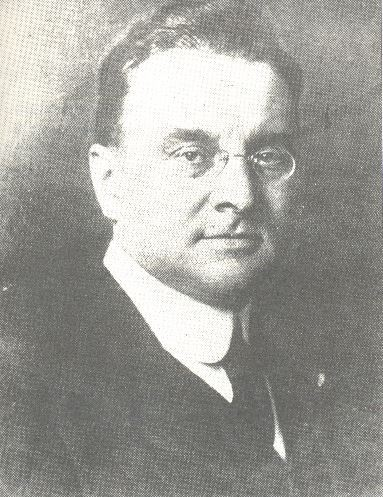
- Born: 1869; Quebec, Dominion of Canada
- Died: 1931 (aged 61–62)
- Occupation: Journalist

External image
- MacKenzie in October, 1904

Frederick Arthur MacKenzie (1869–1931) (Note: His surname was often spelled 'McKenzie') was a Canadian journalist that covered several geopolitical developments in East Asia in the early 20th century. He was one of the few Western journalists to cover the Russo-Japanese War from the Japanese side and the Korean resistance against Japan during the Japanese occupation of Korea.

He briefly contributed to the Pall Mall Gazette, and then for several years he worked with the Daily Mail as a travelling correspondent in East Asia. His last book was on religious persecution in Soviet Russia.

In 2014, he was posthumously awarded the Order of Merit for National Foundation by the Korean Government.

== Early life ==
MacKenzie was born in Quebec in 1869, and described himself as "Scots-Canadian", although he would later tell locals abroad that he was English for convenience's sake.

== Career ==
=== Russo-Japanese War ===
As a war correspondent for the Daily Mail, Frederick A. MacKenzie registered the Russo-Japanese War. During these years, he travelled to Korea and Manchuria with American writers Jack London and Robert L. Dunn. They were the only Western journalists witnessing the early stages of the conflict on the side of the Japanese army.

MacKenzie exalted the Japanese soldiers that fought in the war. He praised their education and observed the soft treatment given to captured Russian officers. He also remarked about the ability of Japanese soldiers to stand prolonged exertion.

=== Covering Korean resistance ===
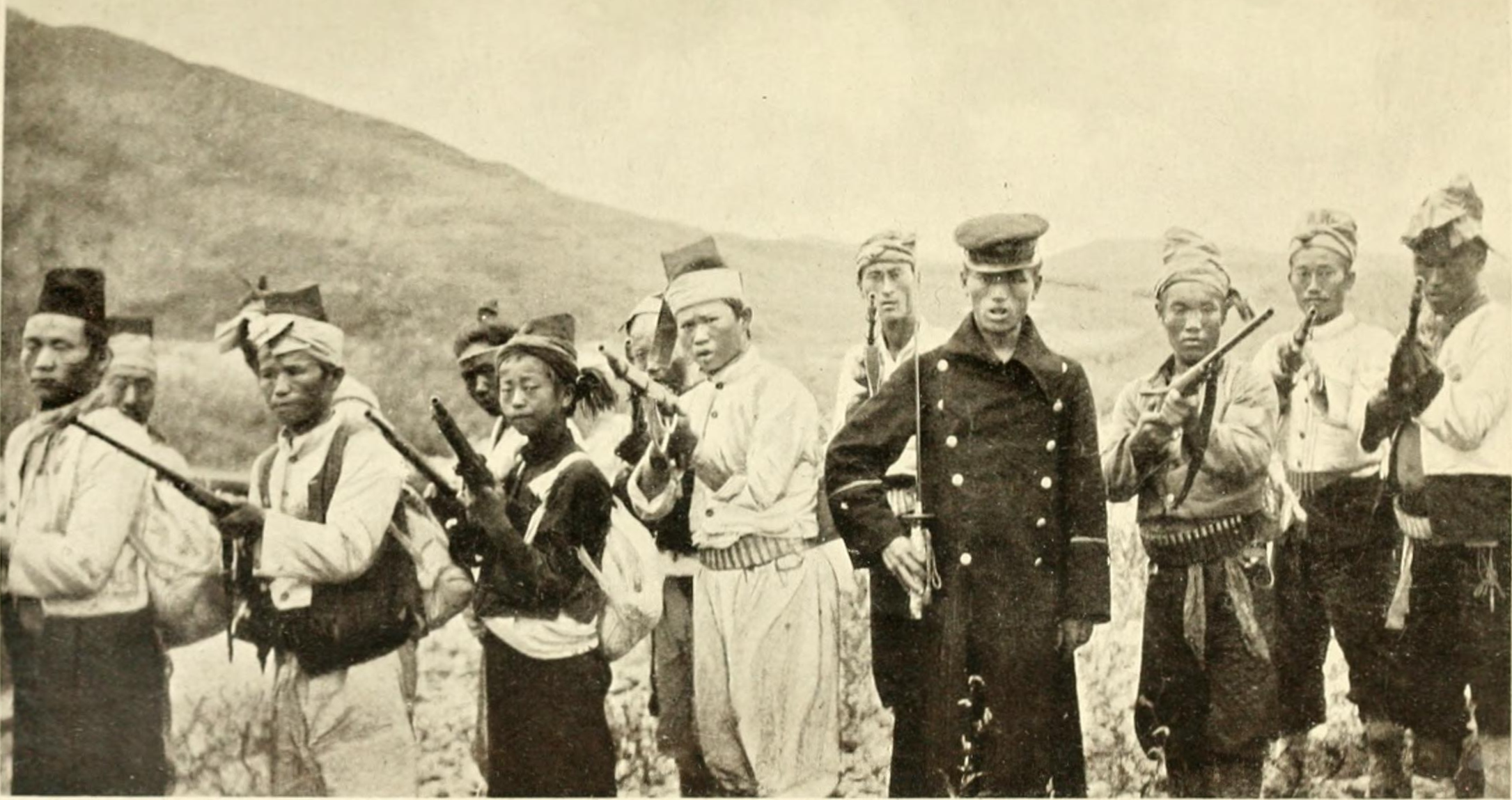
Korean Rebels of the Righteous Army. Photo taken by F. A. MacKenzie.

MacKenzie returned to England after the Russo-Japanese War, but he visited Korea again to cover the Japanese intervention in the peninsula. He stayed in the Korean Empire for almost two years, from the summer of 1906 to the end of 1907. During that time, he wrote about King Sunjong's coronation ceremony in July 1907, the righteous armies, and British journalist Ernest Thomas Bethell's deportation.

Frederick MacKenzie eyewitnessed the abuse of Japanese forces on his way to Icheon, despite Japan's attempts to obstruct the work of foreign journalists. He went to Chungju, Chungcheongbuk-do Province, where he met the righteous army soldiers in person.

MacKenzie took the only remaining photos of the righteous armies of Korea. He described their integrants as an example of what patriotism was, with "sparkling eyes and smiles".

In 1908, MacKenzie published The Tragedy of Korea, a book that accounts for the events that led to the destruction of the Korean Empire and the posterior Japanese rule on Korea.

In 1919, MacKenzie wrote another book about Korea's resistance against the Japanese rule: Korea's Fight For Freedom. In the book, he accounted for the spirit of independence of the Koreans in the March 1st Movement. In their writings, MacKenzie described with details the torture methods of Japanese, and he emphasized that the March 1st Movement was "a demonstration, not a riot", but Japanese police responded using their swords freely.

In 2014, the Korean Government awarded MacKenzie posthumously with the grade of Order of Independence, Order of Merit for National Foundation.

=== Religious persecution in Russia ===
In 1930, MacKenzie published a book about religious persecution during the Bolshevism in Russia. In the preface of the book, he pointed out that the book was "a record, a protest, and an appeal".

The book is mainly based on the personal experiences of the author, who was in the Soviet State from 1921 until 1924. After that, he was established in Stockholm and he visited frequently Finland, Estonia, and Latvia, trying to keep in touch with the Russian situation.

As the Daily Mail took a strong position against Bolshevism in Russia, MacKenzie preferred not to be a correspondent of them for that research. Instead, he contacted Edward Price Bell of the Chicago Daily News, and Lord Beaverbrook and R. D. Blurnfeld of the Daily Express. This partnership allows him to visit Moscow for the winter, and he stayed there for many years.

== Criticism ==
After writing Tragedy of Korea, critics alleged MacKenzie was exaggerated and accused him of being "anti-Japanese". He responded by writing:

No man has written more appreciatively of certain phases of Japanese character and accomplishments than myself. My personal relations with the Japanese, more especially with the Japanese Army, left me with no sense of personal grievance but with many pleasant and cordial memories.

== Selected works ==
- Sober by Act of Parliament, 1894
- Paul Kruger: His Life Story, 1899, about Paul Kruger
- "The Worst Street in London", Daily Mail, 16 July 1901
- American Invaders, 1902
- From Tokyo to Tiflis: Uncensored Letters from the War, Hurst and Blackett, 1905
- The Unveiled East, Hutchinson & Co., London, 1907
- The Tragedy of Korea, 1908
- The Colonial Policy of Japan in Korea, 1906
- The Peace Conference - The Claim of the Korean People and National Petition, April 1919
- Korea's Fight For Freedom, 1920
- Pussyfoot Johnson: Crusader, Reformer, a Man Among Men, 1920 (about William E. Johnson)
- The Mystery of the Daily Mail. London: Associated Newspapers. 1921. LCCN 22-18469; OCLC 270061 (all editions).
1. Via Internet Archive (University of Toronto Library).
2. Via Google Books (Michigan).
- Russia Before Dawn. 1923.
1. Via Google Books (Cal Berkeley).
- The Russian Crucifixion: The Full Story of the Persecution of Religion Under Bolshevism. London: Jarrolds Publishers. March 1, 1930.
1. Via Internet Archive.
