= Berkeley Vincent =

British Army general (1871–1963)

Brigadier-General Sir Berkeley Vincent KBE CB CMG
- Portrait by Walter Stoneman, 1924
- Born: 4 December 1871
- Died: 29 January 1963 (aged 91)
- Military career
- Allegiance: United Kingdom
- Branch: British Army
- Service years: 1891–1924
- Rank: Brigadier-General
- Unit: Royal Artillery
- Commands: 35th Infantry Brigade
- Conflicts: Second Boer War; World War I
- Awards: Knight Commander of the Order of the British Empire; Companion of the Order of the Bath; Companion of the Order of St. Michael and St. George

Brigadier-General Sir Berkeley Vincent, KBE, CB, CMG (4 December 1871 – 29 January 1963) was a British Army officer and sportsman.

== Military career ==
Educated at Wellington College and the Royal Military Academy, Woolwich, Vincent was commissioned into the Royal Artillery as a second lieutenant on 24 July 1891. He was promoted to lieutenant on 24 July 1894 and to captain on 13 February 1900. He served with the China Expeditionary Force in late 1900 and then in the Second Boer War in South Africa.

Following the end of the war, Vincent left Point Natal for India on the SS Ionian in October 1902 with other officers and men of the J Battery Royal Horse Artillery, and after arrival in Bombay, was stationed in Meerut, Bengal Presidency. In 1903, Vincent was sent to Tokyo to learn Japanese: he served as British military attaché with the Japanese Army during the Russo-Japanese War and, from 1 March 1904, was attached to the 2nd Division of the First Japanese Army in Manchuria.

Vincent was a protégé of Ian Hamilton, also an observer in the Russo-Japanese War, and who Vincent had served as an assistant military secretary in October 1905. Vincent attended the Staff College, Camberley. The then commandant of the college, Henry Wilson, was sceptical of Berkeley's claims that Japanese morale had enabled their infantry to overcome Russian defensive firepower. He was promoted to major in the 6th (Inniskilling) Dragoons in 1908.

In January 1910 he was appointed as a professor at the Staff College. In 1911, when Vincent learned that he was to leave his job, and was shown General Haig's critical report on him, he availed himself of his right to Appeal to the King, under Section 42 of the Army Act, claiming unfair dismissal.

He served in World War I, initially as a general staff officer with the Indian Corps. In April 1915 he was promoted to temporary lieutenant colonel and was appointed as general staff officer, grade 1, essentially chief of staff, of the 37th Division, a Kitchener's Army formation. Appointed a Companion of the Order of St Michael and St George in 1916, he took part in the Battle of the Somme and the Battle of Ancre. Promoted in January 1917 to brevet lieutenant colonel, and soon after to temporary brigadier general, he succeeded Arthur Solly-Flood as commander of the 12th (Eastern) Division's 35th Infantry Brigade. He took part in the Battle of Arras in April, when he was buried alive, and the subsequent retreat, when he was gassed. He also took part in the attack on the Hindenburg Line. He was promoted on 3 June 1918 to brevet colonel.

After the war, he became commanding officer of the 6th (Inniskilling) Dragoons. He went on to be commander of the British Forces in Iraq in 1922 and retired from the army in 1924.

== Honours ==
- Companion of the Order of St. Michael and St. George (CMG), 1916.
- Companion of the Order of the Bath (CB), 1919.
- Knight Commander of the Order of the British Empire (KBE), 1924 Birthday Honours.

Coat of arms of Berkeley Vincent
Notes Confirmed 23 November 1928 by Sir Nevile Rodwell Wilkinson, Ulster King of Arms. Crest On a wreath of the colours out of a ducal coronet Or a griffin's head Gules charged with a billet of the first. Escutcheon Azure three cinquefoils Argent within a bordure Or. Motto Vincenti Dabitur

== See also ==
- Military attachés and observers in the Russo-Japanese War

== Sources ==
- Burke, John and Bernard Burke. (1914). Burke's genealogical and heraldic history of peerage, baronetage and knightage. London: Burke's Peerage Ltd. OCLC 2790692
- Debrett, John, Charles Kidd, David Williamson. (1990). Debrett's Peerage and Baronetage. New York: Macmillan. ISBN 978-0-333-38847-1
- Jeffery, Keith (2006). Field Marshal Sir Henry Wilson: A Political Soldier. Oxford University Press. ISBN 978-0-19-820358-2.
- Davies, Frank (1997). Bloody Red Tabs: General Officer Casualties of the Great War 1914–1918. London: Pen & Sword Books. ISBN 978-0-85052-463-5.
