= Julie Johnson =

Julie Johnson may refer to:

- Julie Johnson (film), a 2001 independent American drama film
- Julie Johnson (actress), country singer and actress
- Julie Johnson (politician), American politician from Texas
- Julie Johnson (author) (born 1991), American writer
- Julie A. Johnson, American clinical pharmacist

== See also ==
- Julie Howard, married name Johnson, former Canadian swimmer
- Julie Johnston (disambiguation)
- Julia Johnson, singer-songwriter
