= Melissa Fitzgerald =

American actress, activist (born 1965 or 1966)

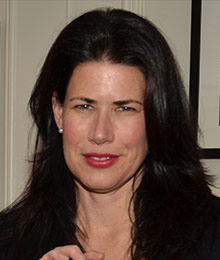
- Fitzgerald in 2013
- Born: 1965 or 1966 (age 59–60)
- Education: University of Pennsylvania
- Occupations: Actress, nonprofit administrator
- Spouse: Noah Emmerich (m. 1998)

Melissa Fitzgerald (born 1965 or 1966) is an American actress and the senior director of the nonprofit organization Justice For Vets. She played Carol Fitzpatrick on The West Wing.

== Early life and education ==
Fitzgerald grew up in the Chestnut Hill area of Philadelphia. Her father is Pennsylvania judge James Fitzgerald; her mother, Carol, is involved in politics and volunteer work in Philadelphia.

Fitzgerald graduated from Springside School in Philadelphia, Pennsylvania, in 1983, and earned a B.A. in drama and literature from the University of Pennsylvania in 1987. Fitzgerald studied acting at The Neighborhood Playhouse School of the Theatre in New York City.

== Career ==
In 1995, Fitzgerald founded Voices in Harmony, a non-profit community theater in Los Angeles. From 1999 to 2006, she played Carol Fitzpatrick, assistant to press secretary C.J. Cregg, on The West Wing.

On January 19, 2007, Nicholas Kristof of The New York Times announced that Fitzgerald had won a writing contest he had sponsored on Darfur.

On May 17, 2008, Fitzgerald received the Chestnut Hill College Medal, and she was the commencement speaker.

In November 2013, Fitzgerald joined Justice For Vets as its director of strategic engagement. The organization advocates for veterans treatment courts.

In August 2024, Fitzgerald and Mary McCormack published "What's Next", a behind the scenes look into the creation and legacy of The West Wing

== Personal life ==
Fitzgerald married actor Noah Emmerich in November 1998.

== Filmography ==
=== Movies ===
- Love & Sex
- Frequency
- Monument Ave.
- The Truman Show
- Boxing Helena
- The Date

=== Television ===
- The West Wing
- Grey's Anatomy
