= Machita incident =

World War II-era civil resistance incident in Arizona

Machita Incident
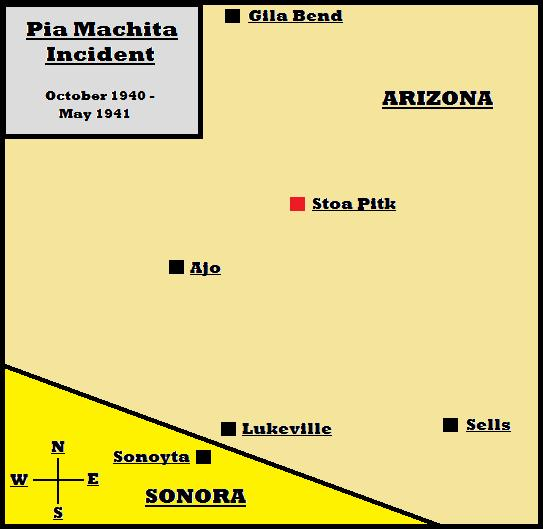
- Date: October 16, 1940 – May 21, 1941
- Location: Pima County, Arizona, United States

The Machita incident refers to events in southern Arizona between October 1940 and May 1941 related to the resistance by traditional O'odham chief and medicine man Pia Machita (O'odham: Pi ’Am Maccuḍḍam) to the United States draft of Native American men in the World War II era. Because the government feared his influence among Native American peoples, tribal and federal forces attempted to arrest Machita in October for this resistance.

In the ensuing physical altercation, his people managed to free him, and he and about 25 followers fled into the desert. They evaded capture until May 17, 1941, when they were found at their village. Machita and two followers were originally sentenced to 18 months in a federal prison, but their sentences were reduced by the intervention of tribal chairman Peter Blaine. A late 20th-century historian described this as the "most dramatic of Indian resistance" efforts to the United States during the World War II-era, with another commentator saying that the story of Pia Machita "needs to be told, considered, and even celebrated."

== Background ==
Pia Machita (O'odham: Pi ’Am Maccuḍḍam, meaning He Has no Metate), was born around 1860 and was eighty to eighty-four years old when the trouble began. Known as a chief and medicine man of the Tohono O'odham tribe, he lived with his small band of about thirty people in the northwestern area of the Hickiwan District, at an isolated village called Stoa Pitk. The O'odham people were divided among those who followed more traditional ways, such as Machita and his band, and other bands that accepted more assimilation. According to tribal chairman at the time, Peter Blaine, many of the isolated villages in this district had not seen white men since the 1930s.

Machita identified as a Mexican citizen. He said that he did not recognize the Gadsden Purchase of 1853, by which the United States took "control" of O'odham land. He considered the US an enemy and recognized neither the authority of the federal government's Indian Bureau nor of the O'odham central tribal government established under it.

The Tohono O'odham tribe of southern Arizona was one of the last to begin assimilation. In the 1930s, some members had conducted non-violent resistance to the Bureau of Indian Affairs construction of water wells on the Papago Reservation, and were concerned about the loss of communal land. Traditional leaders such as Machita feared that using the wells would make their people dependent on them for water; they preferred their communal methods of collecting and storing rain and spring water. In a 1934 meeting to discuss the Indian Reorganization Act with T.B. Hall, the superintendent of the Sells Indian agency, Machita said that "his people owed allegiance to Mexico." After the interview, Machita stopped cooperating with the Indian Bureau regarding land conservation, inoculation of cattle, and taking of the 1940 census.

After the Selective Training and Service Act was passed in 1940, agents of the BIA worked to draft Native American men into the armed forces. Machita resisted the draft and encouraged young men in his band to refuse to register. According to author Brad Melton, the majority of Machita's band were illiterate and therefore ineligible for the draft, but Machita was not aware of this in his resistance.

By 1942, however, nearly 99 percent of eligible Native American men from the numerous tribes in Arizona had registered for the draft. The men also enlisted in the military services at a high rate.

== Incident ==
On October 13, 1940, Indian agents arrived at Stoa Pitk to register eligible men of the village for the draft, but the O'odham refused to comply. After a few days, the tribal chief of police and a force of United States Marshals under the command of Ben McKinney raided Stoa Pitk to arrest Machita. The raid began at 2:00 AM on October 16, 1940. Entering with guns drawn and tear gas grenades at the ready, the law enforcement force captured Machita without a shot fired. While they withdrew, the O'odham villagers confronted the raiders and released of their chief. They severely beat one of the marshals in the process. After the scuffle, the police retreated to Tucson, and Machita fled into the desert with 25 followers.

The Bureau of Indian Affairs (BIA) tried to move quickly to suppress the "draft rebels," because they feared that the resistance to the draft would spread to other reservations. For the next seven months, Machita evaded both the police and the military. Machita and his band could have easily crossed the border into Sonora, Mexico, but accounts suggest that they remained within Arizona.

O'odham oral tradition says that US Army aircraft bombed their villages. Documentation has shown that the "bombs" were sacks of flour dropped to mark the villages for ground searches, as they blended in with the surrounding desert. Machita and his band were finally apprehended without incident at Stoa Pitk on May 21, 1941. Machita and two followers were sentenced to serve eighteen months at the Terminal Island Federal Prison in California. Tribal chairman Peter Blaine persuaded the judge in the case to set a lesser sentence.

== Legacy ==
A 1941 newspaper editorial opined:

For goodness knows how many years Pia Machita has exercised undisputed authority over his little group of villagers. To those who have sought to bring him into what we call civilization he has declared, "this is my land, these are my people; the white man leave me alone, I leave the white man alone." And so Pia Machita's life tells a little story of civilization. The weak must give way to the strong, must submit to superior force. In this year 1941, when with one breath we express horror at the use of race, we give approval to the use of force against a man who has had part of his lands taken away from him by force, who now has his own liberty taken away by force.

Late 20th century historians have approached the context of these incidents from a different point of view, assessing how the O'odham viewed their long and difficult history with European invaders and colonizers. They have placed Pia Machita among those who asserted the sovereignty of this indigenous people. For instance, Alison Bernstein described this as the "most dramatic of Indian resistance" efforts to United States policies during the World War II-era.

== See also ==
- Native Americans and World War II
