= Julie Johnston (disambiguation) =

Julie Johnston (married name Ertz) is an American association football player.

Julie Johnston may also refer to:

- Julie Johnston (writer), winner of Governor General's Award for English-language children's literature
- Julie Johnston (Bad Girls), a character in Bad Girls

== See also ==
- Julie Johnson (disambiguation)
