= Windtalkers =

2002 American war film by John Woo

- Theatrical release poster
- Directed by: John Woo
- Written by: Joe Batteer; John Rice
- Produced by: Terence Chang; Tracie Graham-Rice; Alison Rosenzweig; John Woo
- Starring: Nicolas Cage; Adam Beach; Peter Stormare; Noah Emmerich; Mark Ruffalo; Brian van Holt; Roger Willie; Frances O'Connor; Christian Slater
- Cinematography: Jeffrey L. Kimball
- Edited by: Jeff Gullo; Steven Kemper; Tom Rolf
- Music by: James Horner
- Production companies: Metro-Goldwyn-Mayer; Lion Rock Productions
- Distributed by: MGM Distribution Co. (North America); 20th Century Fox (International)
- Release date: June 14, 2002
- Running time: 134 minutes 153 minutes (director's cut)
- Country: United States
- Language: English
- Budget: $115 million
- Box office: $76.7 million

Windtalkers is a 2002 American war film directed and co-produced by John Woo, starring Nicolas Cage and Adam Beach, with Peter Stormare, Noah Emmerich, Mark Ruffalo, and Christian Slater in supporting roles. It is based on the real story of code talkers from the Navajo nation during World War II.

The film was theatrically released in the United States by MGM Distribution Co. on June 14, 2002, receiving mixed-to-negative reviews from critics and grossing just $76.7 million worldwide against a production budget of $115 million, making it a box-office bomb.

== Plot ==
During World War II, US Marine Corporal Joe Enders returns to active duty after surviving the Solomon Islands campaign in which his entire squad was killed. Enders and Sergeant Pete "Ox" Henderson are assigned to protect two Navajo code talkers in a joint assault signal company (JASCO). Private Ben Yahzee and Private Charlie Whitehorse, childhood friends from the Navajo tribe, are trained to transmit coded artillery fire control orders. Enders and Henderson are instructed to kill the code talkers if capture is imminent so codes do not fall into enemy hands, an assignment the Marines resent. The Navajos also endure racial harassment by some of the white Marines such as Private Chick.

During the invasion of Saipan, the Marines come under friendly fire from U.S. artillery after the beachhead is secured. Yahzee's radio is destroyed and he disguises himself as a Japanese soldier with Enders posing as his prisoner. Yahzee commandeers an enemy radio and redirects artillery fire onto the Japanese position. That night, the Marines bivouac in a village. Yahzee reports to the command post to translate a code, and Enders becomes increasingly conflicted about his orders to kill Yahzee if necessary. His request for reassignment is denied. The next morning, Henderson is killed in a Japanese ambush, and Enders is forced to kill Whitehorse when he is captured. Yahzee discovers Whitehorse's body and confronts Enders at gunpoint but can't bring himself to pull the trigger. Enders explains he hated killing Whitehorse and that their mission was to protect the code above all else.

The Marines return to action on Mount Tapochau. Enders, Yahzee, Chick, and Corporal Pappas take cover on a ridge, and observe Japanese artillery fire on a Marine convoy below. Yahzee charges at the Japanese, who shoot him and Enders. Fearing capture and torture by the Japanese, Yahzee pleads for Enders to kill him. Enders carries him to safety instead. Navy planes bomb the Japanese positions, and Enders is mortally wounded after Yahzee is safe.

After his repatriation, Yahzee travels with his family to Point Mesa in Monument Valley, Arizona and pay respects to their elders in an elaborate Navajo ritual.

== Cast ==
- Nicolas Cage as Sergeant Joe Enders
- Adam Beach as Private Ben Yahzee
- Peter Stormare as Gunnery Sergeant Richard Hjelmsted, Platoon Sergeant
- Noah Emmerich as Private First Class Charles "Chick" Clusters, a BAR gunner
- Mark Ruffalo as Corporal Milo Pappas, a rifleman
- Christian Slater as Sergeant Peter "Ox" Henderson
- Roger Willie as Private Charlie Whitehorse
- Brian Van Holt as Private Andrew Harrigan, the flamethrower man
- Martin Henderson as Private Thomas Nellie, a rifleman
- Frances O'Connor as Pharmacist's Mate 2nd Class Rita Swelton
- Scott Atkinson as Camp Tarawa Staff Sergeant
- Jason Isaacs as Major Mellitz

== Production ==
In November 1998, it was announced United Artists would develop Windtalkers as a directorial vehicle for John Woo. Scenes were cut from the film based on their inaccuracies, including anachronistic profanity. Other scenes depicted war crimes committed by the Marines were removed, such as the collection of gold teeth from dead Japanese soldiers, and a scene in which the character Enders kills a prisoner with a flamethrower, with Marine corps advisor Lieutenant Colonel Morgan reasoning that it would out of character for an intelligent sergeant to kill a knowledgeable asset. Despite this, the film depicts the Marines being ordered to kill the code talkers to prevent their capture, although there is no evidence stating this was practiced.

The opening scene was originally storyboarded to take place in Tarawa, but it was never shot. The romantic relationship between Enders and Swelton was shortened for the film, with studio interference resulting in the addition of a scene at the code talker's training school, and the insertion of an anachronistic 50 star American flag at the end of the film. The technical and historical consultants emphasized adherence to a historically accurate depiction, with armourer Rock Galotti removing all lugs from M1 carbines, and Japanese advisor Dan King focused on ensuring Japanese insignia on tanks remained accurate. Roger Willie also served as an advisor to Woo regarding the Navajo ritual depicted in the film. Costume supervisor Nick Scarano had 1300 Marine and 1000 Japanese uniforms manufactured from special fabrics using historically researched material, blending camouflage and green fatigues as well as giving the costumes a worn look to represent the mismatched combination of soldiers later in the war.

Filming locations on Hawaii included Kualoa Ranch, the location where Lost and Jurassic Park were shot. To portray the Marines in the film the producers recruited extras that were volunteers from Schofield Barracks Army Base, Hickam Air Force Base, Pearl Harbor Naval Station, and Kaneohe Marine Corps Air Station. Some of the actual Marines from 4th Force Recon Company were used in the film portraying their actual job. As many as 700 extras were present on set at once, hired locally. Hawaii's large Japanese population provided a large number of extras to play soldiers in the Imperial Japanese army. The core cast and 62 extras went through a week of boot camp training. A significant amount of the filming also took place in Los Angeles, with the move to California increasing the budget and resulting in the rebuilding of the native village set, with five villages being built in total. The Battle of Saipan sequence required demanding Steadicam work.

Some violence was trimmed in order to avoid an NC-17 rating. This violence trim was restored for the Director's cut released on DVD running 153 minutes.

Windtalkers was the first film released by Metro-Goldwyn-Mayer to theaters after the merger of Hewlett-Packard and Compaq occurred on May 3, 2002; the film's release date was moved from November 9, 2001, to June 14, 2002, due to the September 11 attacks.

For the F6F Hellcat fighters that appear in the beach-landing scenes on Saipan, the producers used computer-generated versions.

== Reception ==
=== Box office ===
$41 million at the US box-office and a total of $77.6 million worldwide, against a production budget of $115 million.

=== Critical response ===
On the review aggregator website Rotten Tomatoes, 33% of 161 critics' reviews are positive. The website's consensus reads: "The action sequences are expertly staged. Windtalkers, however, sinks under too many clichés and only superficially touches upon the story of the code talkers." Metacritic, which uses a weighted average, assigned the film a score of 51 out of 100, based on 35 critics, indicating "mixed or average" reviews. Audiences surveyed by CinemaScore gave the film a grade B+ on scale of A to F.

Roger Ebert of the Chicago Sun-Times gave the film 2 out of 4 stars, remarking that "the filmmakers have buried it beneath battlefield cliches, while centering the story on a white character played by Nicolas Cage". Robert Koehler of Variety called it "A powerful premise turned into a stubbornly flat, derivative war movie."

The film was criticized for featuring the Navajo characters only in supporting roles; they were not the primary focus of the film. The film was ranked number four on Careeraftermilitary.com's "10 Most Inaccurate Military Movies Ever Made" which also included The Patriot, The Hurt Locker, U-571, The Green Berets, Pearl Harbor, Battle of the Bulge, Red Tails, Enemy at the Gates and Flyboys on its list of falsified war movie productions.

About the response, John Woo said: "The main themes of Windtalkers are friendship and understanding. Unfortunately, the studio wanted a John Wayne movie, just a typical American hero film with explosions every few minutes. I had to make them understand that this wasn't a story about heroes. It's a story about a man and his own demons, trying to redeem himself from war. I made the movie that way, but some people in the studio didn't appreciate it and, in the end, I guess neither did the audience." In 2023, Woo said: “There were not many people who really understood that movie or liked it. It was not good timing. The movie had to be released in 2001. Then 9/11 happened, so they had to push it. They were so afraid audiences wouldn’t want to watch a war movie at that time. I had a conflict with the writers. I said, “My kind of movie is usually about friendship, respect, and honor.” But the writers didn't feel good about that. They said, “The enemy is the enemy. The enemy has to be destroyed.” I tried to make it a human story. The audience didn't expect a movie about friendship. But I'm still proud of that movie.“

=== Accolades ===
Year	Award	Recipients	Category	Result
2003	Harry Award		Appreciation of History	Nominated
2003	World Stunt Awards	Brett A. Jones	Best Fire Stunt	Won
2003	World Stunt Awards	Al Goto & David Wald	Best Fire Stunt	Nominated
2003	World Stunt Awards	Spencer Sano	Best High Work	Nominated

== See also ==
- Code talker
- List of box office bombs
- Native Americans and World War II
