= Toby Emmerich =

American film producer

- Born: February 8, 1963 (age 63); New York City, New York, U.S.
- Education: B.A. Wesleyan University
- Occupation: Film producer
- Parent: André Emmerich (father)
- Relatives: Noah Emmerich (brother)

Toby Emmerich (born February 8, 1963), is an American producer, film executive, and screenwriter. He formerly served as the chairman of the Warner Bros. Pictures Group.

== Early life and education ==
Emmerich was born to Constance (née Marantz) and André Emmerich (1924–2007), a Frankfurt-born gallery owner and art dealer. His parents lived in New York City at the time of his birth. He is Jewish. He is the brother of Noah Emmerich, an actor, and Adam Emmerich, a mergers and acquisitions lawyer at the firm of Wachtell, Lipton, Rosen & Katz in New York. He attended The Calhoun School in New York City and then graduated from Wesleyan University.

== Career ==
Emmerich was a music executive at Atlantic Records before joining New Line Cinema, where he was an executive music producer of films including Menace II Society (1993) and Above The Rim (1994). He wrote the screenplay to the film Frequency (2000). He later became a producer or executive producer of over 50 films. He also wrote the screenplay for The Last Mimzy (2007).

After serving as president of production at New Line Cinema, Emmerich became president and chief operating officer of New Line on March 18, 2008. In 2017, he became President and Chief Content Officer of the Warner Bros. Pictures Group, and later in 2018 its chairman. As chairman, he "has oversight of the Studio’s global theatrical production, marketing and distribution operations and also oversees the marketing and distribution activities of Warner Bros. Home Entertainment". In October 2019, he extended his contract as chairman of Warner Bros. Pictures Group and elevated top lieutenant Carolyn Blackwood to the newly created position of chief operating officer.

On June 1, 2022, Emmerich announced his resignation from his position with Warner Bros, with Michael De Luca and Pamela Abdy set to replace him after their contracts with Amazon-owned Metro-Goldwyn-Mayer expire. Emmerich remained at his post for a "transitional period" before starting his own production company, signing a five-year funding and distribution deal with Warner Bros. De Luca and Abdy took over in July 2022.

== Filmography ==
Executive producer

- Rush Hour 2 (2001)
- All About the Benjamins (2002)
- Blade II (2002)
- Austin Powers in Goldmember (2002
- Friday After Next (2002)
- Final Destination 2 (2003)
- Willard (2003)
- The Real Cancun (2003)
- Dumb and Dumberer: When Harry Met Lloyd (2003)
- How to Deal (2003)
- Secondhand Lions (2003)
- Elf (2003)
- The Butterfly Effect (2004)
- Highwaymen (2004)
- Laws of Attraction (2004)
- The Notebook (2004)
- Cellular (2004)
- Raise Your Voice (2004)
- After the Sunset (2004)
- Blade: Trinity (2004)
- Son of the Mask (2005)
- King's Ransom (2005)
- Monster-in-Law (2005)
- Wedding Crashers (2005)
- The Man (2005)
- A History of Violence (2005)
- Domino (2005)
- Just Friends (2005)
- The New World (2006)
- Final Destination 3 (2006)
- Take the Lead (2006)
- Hoot (2006)
- Grilled (2006)
- Snakes on a Plane (2006)
- How to Eat Fried Worms (2006)
- The Texas Chainsaw Massacre: The Beginning (2006)
- Little Children (2006)
- Tenacious D in the Pick of Destiny (2006)
- The Nativity Story (2006)
- Code Name: The Cleaner (2007)
- The Number 23 (2007)
- Full of It (2007)
- Fracture (2007)
- Hairspray (2007)
- Rush Hour 3 (2007)
- Shoot 'Em Up (2007)
- Mr. Woodcock (2007)
- Rendition (2007)
- Martian Child (2007)
- The Golden Compass (2007)
- Be Kind Rewind (2008)
- Semi-Pro (2008)
- Harold & Kumar Escape from Guantanamo Bay (2008)
- Sex and the City (2008)
- Journey to the Center of the Earth (2008)
- Appaloosa (2008)
- Pride and Glory (2008)
- Four Christmases (2008)
- Inkheart (2008)
- He's Just Not That Into You (2009)
- 17 Again (2009)
- Ghosts of Girlfriends Past (2009)
- My Sister's Keeper (2009)
- Dear John (2010)
- Valentine's Day (2010)
- Sex and the City 2 (2010)
- Hall Pass (2011)
- Horrible Bosses (2011)
- New Year's Eve (2011)
- Rock of Ages (2012)
- The Hobbit: An Unexpected Journey (2012)
- Jack the Giant Slayer (2013)
- The Incredible Burt Wonderstone (2013)
- We're the Millers (2013)
- The Hobbit: The Desolation of Smaug (2013)
- Tammy (2014)
- Horrible Bosses 2 (2014)
- The Hobbit: The Battle of the Five Armies (2014)
- San Andreas (2015)
- Vacation (2015)
- Keanu (2016)
- The Conjuring 2 (2016)
- Central Intelligence (2016)
- Collateral Beauty (2016)
- Fist Fight (2017)
- Going in Style (2017)
- The House (2017)
- It (2017)
- The Disaster Artist (2017)
- Game Night (2018)
- Rampage (2018)
- Life of the Party (2018)
- The Many Saints of Newark (2021)
- Elvis (2022)
- Black Adam (2022)
- The Flash (2023)
- Barbie (2023)
- The Lord of the Rings: The War of the Rohirrim (2024)

Producer

- Frequency (2000)
- Final Destination Bloodlines (2025)
- Mortal Kombat II (2026)
- I Play Rocky (2026)

Writer

- Frequency (2000)
- The Last Mimzy (2007)

Executive in charge of music

- Above the Rim (1994) (New Line)
- The Endless Summer II (1994)
- Seven (1995)
- Delta of Venus (1995)
- Now and Then (1995)
- Bed of Roses (1996)
- Pie in the Sky (1996)
- Mother Night (1996)
- Last Man Standing (1996)
- The Long Kiss Goodnight (1996)
- In Love and War (1994)
- Dangerous Ground (1997)
- Love Jones (1997)
- B*A*P*S (1997)
- Austin Powers: International Man of Mystery (1997)
- Julian Po (1997)
- Boogie Nights (1997)
- The Wedding Singer (1998
- Dark City (1998)
- Mr. Nice Guy (1998)
- Lost in Space (1998)
- Overnight Delivery (1998)
- Woo (1998)
- Austin Powers: The Spy Who Shagged Me (1999)
- Magnolia (1999)
- Boiler Room (2000)
- The Cell (2000)
- 15 Minutes (2001)

Other credits

Year	Title	Notes
1994	8 Seconds	Music supervisor
1994	Even Cowgirls Get the Blues	Executive music producer
1994	Dumb and Dumber	Music executive
1995	The Viking Sagas	Music executive: New Line
2013	Snitch	Production executive
