= Mary Boies =

American businesswoman

Mary McInnis Boies
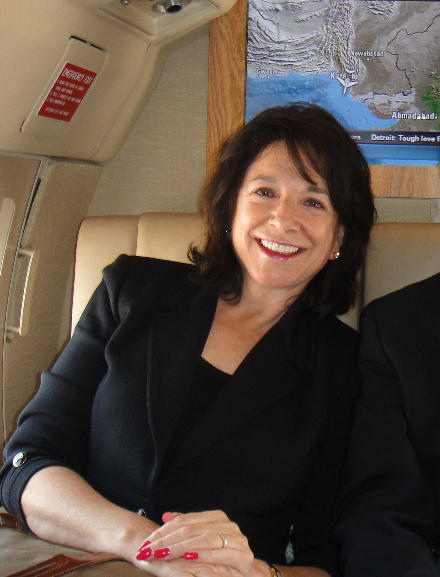
- Born: Mary McInnis; June 30, 1950 (age 76); Newton, New Jersey, U.S.
- Other name: Mary McInnis Schuman
- Education: University of Washington (BA 1972, JD 1975)
- Spouse: David Boies
- Children: 2
- Relatives: Noah Emmerich (son-in-law)

Mary McInnis Boies (born Mary McInnis, formerly Schuman; born June 30, 1950) is an American attorney working as counsel to Boies Schiller Flexner LLP, where she specializes in antitrust and corporate commercial litigation. Boies was a founding partner of the American law firm Boies & McInnis LLP. The law firm, established in 1988, specialized in antitrust and corporate commercial litigation.

== Early life and education ==
Boies was born Mary McInnis in Newton, New Jersey, the daughter of Sara Louise 'Sally' (née Bollinger) and Norman Kenneth McInnis Jr. She earned a Bachelor of Arts degree in history and English from the University of Washington and a Juris Doctor from the University of Washington School of Law.

== Career ==
Boies began her legal career in 1975 when she won the annual fellowship to the staff of the United States Senate Committee on Commerce, Science, and Transportation. She worked on the early hearings relating to airline passenger and cargo deregulation. In 1977, she transferred to the White House Office and served as assistant director of the domestic policy staff with a portfolio of economic deregulation relating to the airline, trucking, and rail industries. During her tenure, the Airline Deregulation Act was enacted.

In 1979, she became general counsel to the Civil Aeronautics Board. She oversaw a staff of 50 lawyers who managed the deregulation process leading to the final transfer of regulatory authority to the Departments of Justice (antitrust) State (international) and Transportation (certain consumer protection and other functions) under the Airline Deregulation Act of 1978.

Upon Ronald Reagan’s inauguration as president in January 1981, she relocated to New York and worked at CBS, first in their law department and thereafter as vice president for corporate information. She departed CBS upon the birth of her second child in 1985 and opened a private law practice in New York that became Boies & McInnis LLP. She has been involved in securities, antitrust and general litigation involving airlines, computer companies, pharmaceutical manufacturers, and insurance companies. In 2012, as she reached retirement age, she wound up her law practice and joined Boies Schiller Flexner LLP as Counsel.

Boies served two terms as a member of the board of directors of the Council on Foreign Relations 2010–2020 and chaired its Committee on Nominations and Governance. She continues as a life member of the Council on Foreign Relations. She serves on the board of directors of the Stimson Center. She served on the board of the MIT Center for International Studies and the Executive Committee and the Dean's Council of the Harvard Kennedy School.

She has served as a member of the board of directors of Paramount Global before its transaction with Skydance and of MBNA before its merger with Bank of America. She was a member of the board of visitors that oversees the Air University at Maxwell Air Force Base. The Air University includes the advanced air and space studies, the Air Force Research Institute, the Air War College, the National Security Space Institute, and the Air Force Institute of Technology. She served a term on the committee established by President Dwight D. Eisenhower to conduct nonpartisan peer reviews of federal judicial nominees including to the Supreme Court of the United States. She serves on the board of advisors of the International Rescue Committee. She previously served on the board of the International Center for Journalists (ICFJ). She is a board member of Business Executives for National Security, a nonpartisan nonprofit that connects best practices in the private sector to our national security agencies. She is on the International Advisory Board of the Central European and Eurasian La w Institutes (CEELI), a Prague-based nonprofit that works with judges at all levels to promote judicial independence, strengthen judicial integrity and improve professional competencies. She is a member of the advisory council of the Smithsonian American Women's History Museum.

She founded and later sold MaryBoies Software Inc., a publisher of children's educational software titles including Top of the Key and Slam Dunk Typing. Her titles were among PC Data’s Top 10 titles and Newsweek’s Top Picks. Titles were translated and distributed into Spanish, Italian, French, Korean, Japanese, and Chinese markets.

== Personal life ==
She has been married to David Boies for 39 years. They have two grown children Mary Regency Boies and Alexander Boies, and three grandchildren. Her daughter Mary is married to Noah Emmerich.

She has competed and finished New York City Triathlons since 2012 (with a personal best of Second in her age and gender category in 2020) as well as triathlons in Napa County, Key West, and Long Island, New York. New York City Olympic Triathlon Results: 2012 (age 62), 2013 (age 63), 2014 (age 64), 2015 (age 65), 2016 (age 66), 2017 (age 67), 2018 (age 68), 2019 (event cancelled), and 2020 (age 70).

== Philanthropy ==
Mary and David Boies sponsor Boies Fellows at the Harvard Kennedy School each year. The Mary and David Boies Fellowship provide assistance to students from Afghanistan, Iraq, Israel, Palestine, and the former Soviet Union countries in Central Asia. They endowed a "Maurice Greenberg Chair" at the Yale Law School. They have also endowed professorships at the University of Pennsylvania, Tulane, Columbia University, NYU Law School, and the University of Redlands. They donated $5 million to Northern Westchester Hospital, in Mount Kisco, New York. As part of an ongoing capital campaign, the Boies' money was used to build the hospital's new emergency room. There is a "Mary and David Boies Reading Room" at the Villa Grebovka, headquarters of the Central European and Eurasian Law Institute in Prague, Czech Republic. There is a Mary and David Boies Chair in U.S. Foreign Policy at the Council on Foreign Relations, currently occupied by Gideon Rose. Its inaugural holder was Philip Gordon. For many years the Boies gave an annual picnic at their home for the incoming Teach for America corps for New York City (300–500 people).
