= Pride and Glory (film) =

- Theatrical release poster
- Directed by: Gavin O'Connor
- Screenplay by: Gavin O'Connor; Joe Carnahan
- Story by: Gavin O'Connor; Greg O'Connor; Robert Hopes
- Produced by: Greg O'Connor
- Starring: Edward Norton; Colin Farrell; Jon Voight; Noah Emmerich; Jennifer Ehle
- Cinematography: Declan Quinn
- Edited by: Lisa Zeno Churgin; John Gilroy
- Music by: Mark Isham
- Production companies: New Line Cinema; Solaris Entertainment; O'Connor Brothers; Avery Pix
- Distributed by: Warner Bros. Pictures
- Release date: October 24, 2008
- Running time: 130 minutes
- Countries: United States; Germany
- Language: English
- Budget: $30 million
- Box office: $31.1 million

Pride and Glory is a 2008 crime drama film directed by Gavin O'Connor, and starring Edward Norton, Colin Farrell, Jon Voight and Noah Emmerich. The film tells the story of a NYPD detective (Norton) who uncovers a police corruption scandal that implicates his brother-in-law (Farrell), threatening to unravel their tightly bound family of law enforcement officers.

Pride and Glory was released in the United States on October 24, 2008, by Warner Bros. Pictures. It received mixed reviews from critics and grossed $43.4 million worldwide against a production budget of $30 million.

== Plot ==
Assistant Chief Francis Tierney Sr. heads a multi-generational NYPD family: his son Francis "Franny" Jr. is Deputy Inspector and commanding officer of the 31st Precinct, where son-in-law Sergeant Jimmy Egan is a patrol officer, while son Ray is a detective who transferred to the Missing Persons Squad after being shot during an arrest two years earlier.

As Jimmy leads the NYPD to victory in city-league football, Franny is notified that four of his officers have been killed at the Washington Heights apartment of drug dealer Angel Tezo. Francis Sr. coaxes Ray into joining the task force investigating the killings, and Ray discovers Tezo's cellphone at the crime scene, where a young eyewitness saw a wounded Tezo hijack a cab. Unbeknownst to Ray, Jimmy and fellow officers Kenny Dugan, Reuben "Sandy" Santiago, and Eddie Carbone find the cab, abandoned by Tezo after shooting the driver. They and the four dead officers are part of a corrupt Special Narcotics Enforcement Unit in Franny's precinct, involved in Tezo's dealings. Under Jimmy's direction, they burn the cab and the driver's body, determined to find Tezo.

Ray tries to reconnect with Tasha, his soon-to-be-ex-wife, while Carbone shakes down a bodega owner for Tezo's whereabouts, beating and robbing the man at gunpoint. Laying low, Tezo shoots a doctor who stitches him up, then later kills his own men and flees when the police track him down. Tezo's girlfriend reveals to Ray that Tezo was tipped off about the Washington Heights raid by an officer named Sandy. Learning this, Franny confronts Santiago, who admits that Jimmy sent his officers to kill Tezo and steal his money in an arrangement with another dealer, Eladio Casado; Santiago warned Tezo due to their childhood friendship, unaware he would ambush the four officers. Franny relieves Santiago of duty but does not inform his superiors, fearful of losing his command.

Casado confronts Jimmy at his home, leading Jimmy and Dugan to interrogate Tezo's lieutenant, Coco; beating Coco, his wife, and threatening their baby with a hot iron, Jimmy is told where Tezo is hiding. Ray discovers the same from an informant, and arrives to find Jimmy torturing Tezo to death. He tries to intervene, but Jimmy uses Ray's gun to kill Tezo, offering the narrative that Ray acted heroically. Ray informs Franny, who remains unwilling to implicate his officers. Overcome with guilt, Santiago tells reporter Carlos Bragon about the corruption within the 31st Precinct before committing suicide in Bragon's car. Bragon warns Ray that he is publishing a story using Santiago's information. Jimmy defends his actions to Franny and offers a cut of the money, but he refuses.

Interviewed by Internal Affairs, Ray simply states that he was not the shooter, while Jimmy lies that Ray killed Tezo in cold blood. Francis Sr. is furious with his son for jeopardizing the department, but Ray reveals that he did enough lying for his father regarding the shooting two years earlier, when officers threw a suspect off a building. Francis Sr. begs Ray to lie to protect their family, but Franny arrives, now prepared to risk his career to bring Jimmy down.

Carbone brings Dugan to the bodega to beat and rob the owner, who shoots Carbone; in a panic, Dugan takes the owner hostage as an angry crowd gathers outside, agitated by Coco. Franny talks Dugan down, while Ray confronts Jimmy alone at a nearby bar and arrests him after a brutal fistfight. In the street, surrounded by Coco and the crowd, a handcuffed Jimmy offers himself to be beaten to death, and a helpless Ray staggers back to Franny. Days later, the three Tierney men arrive at the New York County Courthouse to testify.

== Cast ==
- Colin Farrell as Sergeant Jimmy Egan, Megan's husband
- Edward Norton as Detective Ray Tierney, Francis Sr. and Maureen's son
- Jon Voight as Assistant Chief Francis Tierney Sr.
- Noah Emmerich as Deputy Inspector Francis "Fran" Tierney Jr., Francis Sr. and Maureen's son
- Jennifer Ehle as Abby Tierney, Francis Jr.’s wife
- John Ortiz as Officer Reuben "Sandy" Santiago
- Shea Whigham as Officer Kenny Dugan
- Frank Grillo as Officer Eddie Carbone
- Lake Bell as Megan Egan (née Tierney), Jimmy's wife and Francis Sr. and Maureen's daughter
- Rick Gonzalez as Eladio Casado
- Wayne Duvall as Bill Avery
- Carmen Ejogo as Tasha Tierney, Ray's wife
- Ramón Rodriguez as Angel Tezo
- Manny Pérez as "Coco" Dominguez
- Leslie Denniston as Maureen Tierney, Francis Sr.'s wife
- Hannah Riggins as Caitlin Tierney, Francis Jr. and Abby's daughter
- Carmen LoPorto as Francis Tierney III, Francis Jr. and Abby's son
- Lucy Grace Ellis as Bailey Tierney, Francis Jr. and Abby's daughter
- Ryan Simpkins as Shannon Egan, Jimmy and Megan's daughter
- Ty Simpkins as Matthew Egan, Jimmy and Megan's son
- Maximiliano Hernández as Carlos Bragon

== Production ==
Gavin O'Connor and his twin brother Greg began writing the film with New York City police officer Robert A. Hopes in 1999, after the completion of Tumbleweeds. The brothers, whose father was a police officer, were given "rare" access to the police department and its officers. Gavin O'Connor described their intent: "My father was a New York City detective, and I grew up in that world. It's a birthday bash of honest cops, which was everything my father was about. Though it is fictional, it is an homage to my father." They also hoped to create a film which evoked those of the 1970s, using corruption in the police force as a metaphor for wider institutional corruption. The script was optioned in June 2000 by Fine Line Features, a subdivision of New Line Cinema, and Joe Carnahan was hired to rewrite the script. Production on the film was expected to begin later in 2000, with Gavin O'Connor directing and Greg O'Connor producing.

In 2001, the project was subject to a turnaround deal, which saw the rights ceded to Intermedia. Production was expected to start in February 2002 in New York City, and Mark Wahlberg and Hugh Jackman were in talks to star. The film's development was subject to further delays until 2005. Carnahan cited the September 11, 2001 attacks as the primary reason for the delay: "There was a moment after 9/11, where the notion of doing what might be deemed an anti-cop film, particularly an attack of the NYPD, would be grounds for hanging."

In September 2005, the rights were once more with New Line Cinema. Production president Toby Emmerich (brother of actor Noah, who had previously starred in O'Connor's Tumbleweeds and Miracle) had been a fan of the script for several years, and the studio entered negotiations with Norton, Farrell and Noah Emmerich to star. Production was set to begin in New York City in January 2006, though principal photography did not begin until the following month. Nick Nolte was on set at the start of filming to play Francis Tierney Sr., but after a chronic knee injury flared up, he was unable to perform and was replaced by Voight. Nolte later revealed in his memoir that he quit the film because he couldn't stand Norton's “cocky” attitude.

Cinematographer Declan Quinn said that the biggest challenge was "[trying] to find a fresh way to do a police drama where it feels real and not like something we've seen a hundred times before."

== Release ==
Pride and Glory was originally scheduled for release on March 14, 2008, and trailers for the film appeared, with showings of No Country for Old Men, Atonement, and American Gangster. In January 2008, New Line Cinema announced that it was pushing back the release until 2009, citing both Norton and Farrell's 2008 releases of The Incredible Hulk, and In Bruges respectively. The studio had not commented further on the delay, which angered O'Connor. He blamed internal New Line Cinema politics for the delay, specifically chairman Bob Shaye, saying: "I don't think [Shaye] believes in it, and he's decided he'll only release [sure bet] films. He never had the decency to call me." O'Connor had said he would withhold delivery of his next script for New Line, Warrior, until he discovered the film's fate, and also looked at the possibility of taking the film to another studio. In February 2008, O'Connor held a screening at the headquarters of talent agency CAA, in order to publicize that the film may need a new distributor. By August 2008, Warner Bros. Pictures was still open to finding a new distributor for the film but ultimately, they decided to still release the film with the studio moving up the film from a planned 2009 release to an October 24, 2008 release.

O'Connor said of the situation: "We've delivered something special and unique, a film that's not for everybody but has something to say. We're all heartbroken." Norton blamed a wider industry "paralysis" for the problems, rather than New Line Cinema: "We're a victim of the moment, and I just hope they will either find a way to give the film its due or graciously let us do it with someone else." Farrell said he believed in the film and called the situation "bizarre".

Pride and Glory premiered at the 2008 Toronto International Film Festival on September 9, 2008, followed by its U.S. premiere at the 2008 Chicago International Film Festival on September 22. The film was later released theatrically in the United States on October 24, 2008.

== Reception ==
=== Critical reception ===
On the review aggregator website Rotten Tomatoes, Pride and Glory holds an approval rating of 35% based on 140 reviews, with an average rating of 5.1/10. The site's critical consensus reads: "Formulaic in its plotting and clichéd in its dialogue, Pride and Glory does little to distinguish itself from other police procedurals." On Metacritic, the film has a weighted average score of 45 out of 100, based on 29 critics, indicating "mixed or average reviews." Audiences polled by CinemaScore gave the film an average grade of "B−" on an A+ to F scale.

Peter Bradshaw of The Guardian called Pride and Glory “a tough, sinewy, street-smart drama,” praising its gritty realism and strong performances, while acknowledging that its plot followed familiar beats. James Berardinelli of ReelViews highlighted the committed performances of Edward Norton and Colin Farrell, but noted that the film “relies too heavily on genre conventions to feel fresh.” Common Sense Media described it as “a dark, violent tale of family and betrayal,” recommending it strictly for mature audiences due to its intense content.

Roger Ebert of the Chicago Sun-Times gave the film two stars out of four, calling it “the kind of film where you feel like you know the words and ought to be singing along,” criticizing its overuse of procedural clichés, though he did acknowledge certain powerful moments. Peter Travers of Rolling Stone was more dismissive, referring to it as “an overcooked stew of macho posturing,” while CinemaBlend concluded that despite solid acting, the film lacked the narrative urgency to stand out in a crowded genre.

=== Box office ===
In North America, Pride and Glory opened at #5 with $6,262,396 behind High School Musical 3: Senior Year, Saw V, Max Payne, and Beverly Hills Chihuahua, respectively, from 2,585 theaters with a $2,423 average. As of January 28, 2009, the film has grossed $43,440,721 worldwide.

=== Controversy ===
Pride and Glory received criticism for its depiction of Dominican Americans, with accusations of racist stereotyping. In a strongly worded editorial for Latino Review, writer El Mayimbe, a Dominican-American critic, said that if O'Connor had been at the same screening, "they would have to carry him out of there in a gurney... If I ever run into Gavin or his brother Greg, I will be sure to personally give them ethnic sensitivity classes the likes never given before."

Mayimbe condemned the film as “a modern-day minstrel show,” citing its portrayal of Dominicans as incoherent, buffoonish criminals and drug addicts. He noted that every Dominican character was either slapped, punched, or otherwise dehumanized on screen, with no redeeming representation to counterbalance the depiction. The article highlighted lines from the film that referred to Dominicans as "sewer rats" and implied they spoke a "monkey language," calling the portrayal “appalling,” “disgusting,” and “outright despicable.”

Additional criticism came from IGN, which acknowledged the film's gritty realism but noted its use of tired ethnic stereotypes, and from CHUD.com, which questioned the film's lack of nuance in portraying its characters from marginalized communities.

== Soundtrack ==
The film's original score was composed by Mark Isham.

Track listing

No.	Title	Composer	Length
1.	"Burning Car"	Mark Isham	4:25
2.	"Hospital"	Mark Isham	1:06
3.	"Escape"	Mark Isham	1:44
4.	"Fran and Abby"	Mark Isham	1:45
5.	"Family"	Mark Isham	1:14
6.	"Funeral"	Mark Isham	2:22
7.	"Santiago"	Mark Isham	4:04
8.	"Execution"	Mark Isham	6:09
9.	"Abby"	Mark Isham	1:05
10.	"Protest"	Mark Isham	2:25
11.	"Suicide"	Mark Isham	2:34
12.	"Jimmy Rats"	Mark Isham	4:22
13.	"Confession"	Mark Isham	3:10
14.	"Fran"	Mark Isham	1:42
15.	"Riot"	Mark Isham	6:00
16.	"El Train / Waterline"	Mark Isham	8:46
Total length:			52:53
