= Native Americans and World War II =

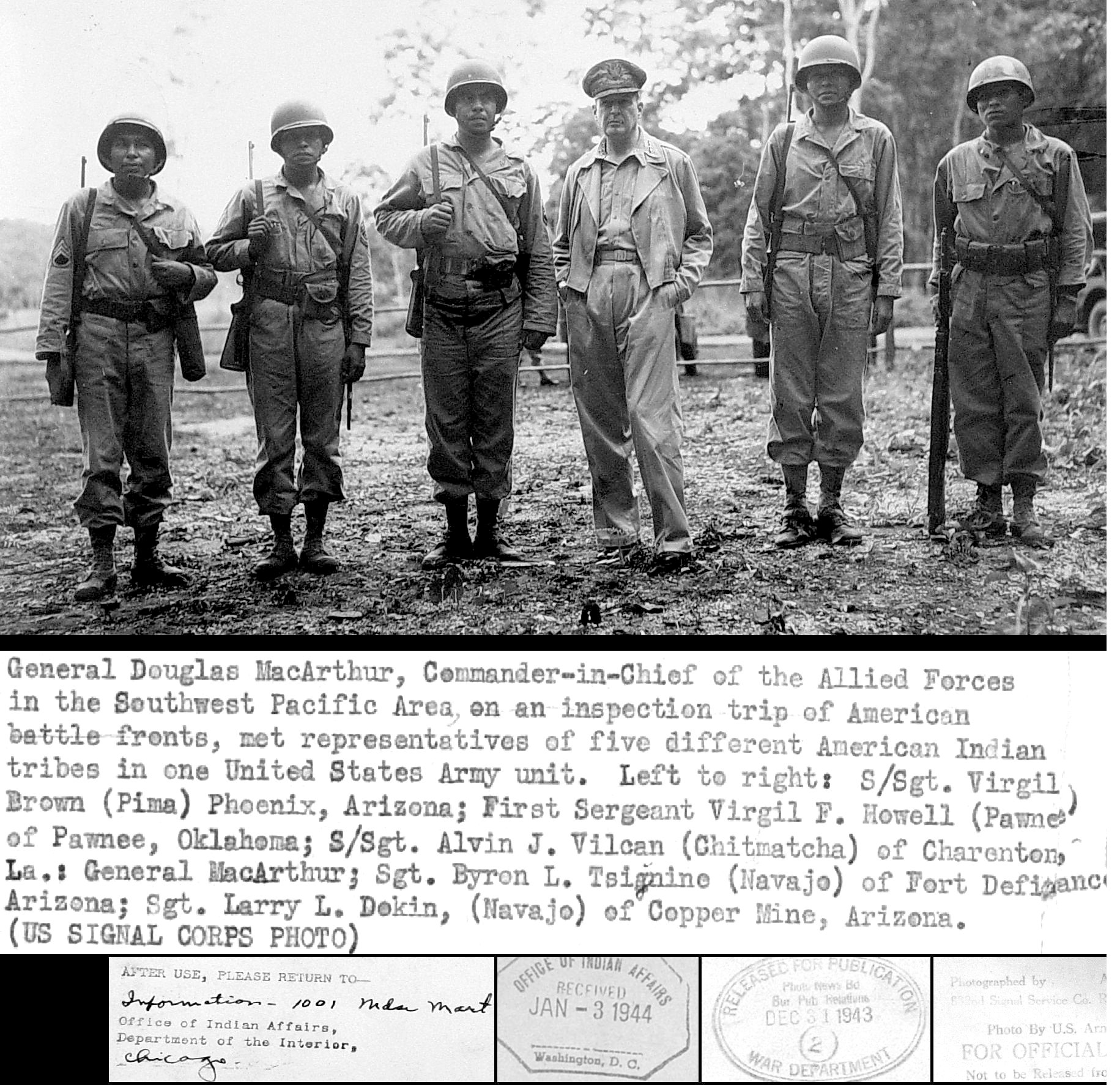
General Douglas MacArthur meeting Navajo, O'odham, Pawnee and other native troops on 31 December 1943.

Native Americans and World War II refers to the contributions of Native Americans to the United States military and home front from 1939 to 1945. Scholars estimate that approximately 44,000 Native American men and women enlisted in the military during World War II. According to the Navy Department publication, Indians in the War, in 1945 Native Americans were serving in all branches of the military. There were 21,767 in the Army, 1,910 in the Navy, 723 in the Marines, 121 in the Coast Guard. In addition Native American women also served in both the Women's Army Corps (WAC) and Women Accepted for Volunteer Emergency Service (WAVES). These figures included over one-third of all able-bodied Native American men aged 18 to 50, and even included as high as seventy percent of the population of some tribes. The first Native American to be killed in WWII was Henry E. Nolatubby, a Chickasaw from Oklahoma. He was part of the Marine Detachment serving on the USS Arizona and went down with the ship during the Japanese attack on Pearl Harbor on December 7, 1941. Unlike African Americans or Asian Americans, Native Americans did not serve in segregated units, and served alongside white Americans.

Alison R. Bernstein argues that World War II presented the first large-scale exodus of Native Americans from reservations since the reservation system began and that it presented an opportunity for many Native Americans to leave reservations and enter the "white world." For many soldiers, World War II represented the first interracial contact for natives living on relatively isolated reservations.

== Prewar ==
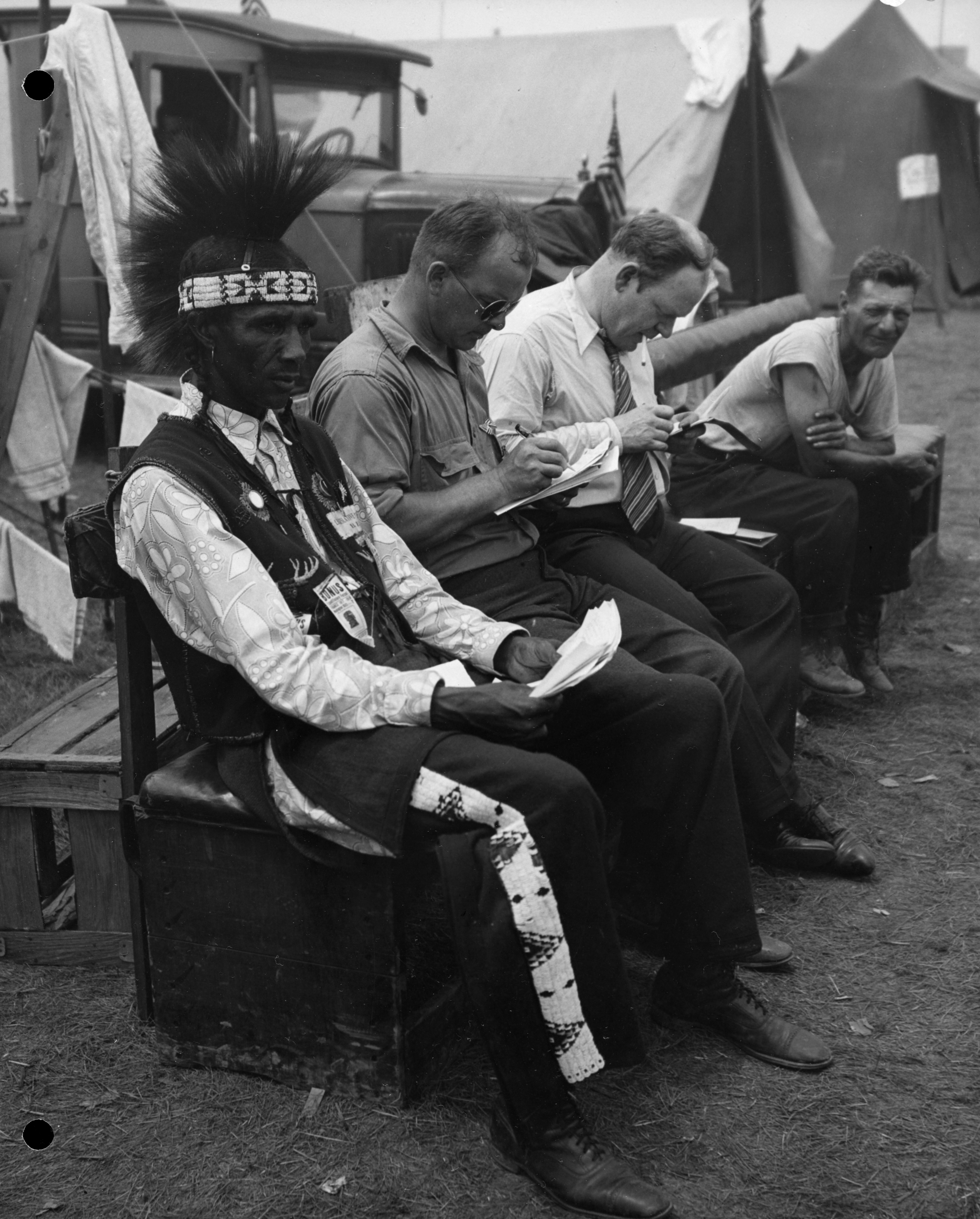
A Native American veteran at the Bonus Army camp in Washington, D.C. c. July 1932

Although Native Americans were not drafted for World War I because they were not yet considered citizens of the United States, approximately 10,000 Native American men volunteered for duty.

According to Bernstein, life on reservations was difficult for Native Americans prior to the war due to low levels of development and lack of economic opportunities. In 1939, the median income for Native American males living on reservations was $500, compared to the national average for males of $2,300. Nearly one quarter of Native Americans had no formal education, and even for high school graduates, few forms of conventional employment existed on reservations. In the absence of conventional employment, those Native Americans who stayed on the reservations generally worked the land and farmed.

Native American men were included along with whites in the World War II draft. Initial reactions by Native Americans to the draft were mixed. While some were eager to join the military, others resisted. Bernstein argues that their still-questionable status as citizens of the United States at the outbreak of the Second World War made many Native Americans question volunteering for military service since "the Federal government had the power to force Indians to serve in the military but did not have the power to compel Mississippi to grant Indians the vote." Although some resisted the draft, many others who were not drafted still volunteered for the war.

== Native home front ==
Well known American actor and humorist Will Rogers, a citizen of the Cherokee Nation of Oklahoma, stated, "The United States never broke a treaty with a foreign government and never kept one with the Indians." President Roosevelt was in need of more troops hence turning to the Native Americans for their services on the side of Axis Powers. Nearly, 2,500 Navajo constructed the Fort Wingate Ordinance Depot in New Mexico and Pueblo Indians built the Naval Supply Depot in Utah. Furthermore, women played a vital role by taking over traditional men duties on the reservations by manning the lookout stations, then becoming mechanics, lumberjacks, farms, and delivery personnel keeping society afloat as the war began. Native lands provided war essential materials such as oil, gas, lead, zinc, copper, vanadium, asbestos, gypsum, and goal. Even Navajo helium in New Mexico was used during the Manhattan Project to make the atomic bomb.

== Native service ==
Against a background of the popular Hollywood image of the Native American warrior spirit in American popular culture, Native American men were generally regarded highly by their fellow soldiers, and their role appealed to the public. They first saw action in the Pacific Theater along with the rest of the US Army and Navy. The first known Native American casualty of war was a young Oklahoma man who died during the Japanese attack on Pearl Harbor.

Over the course of the war, Native American men fought across the world on all fronts, and were involved in many of the most critical battles involving American troops, including Iwo Jima—the site of Ira Hayes' triumphant moment in the famous photograph of Raising the Flag on Iwo Jima with five of his fellow Marines—the invasion of Normandy, the liberation of the Philippines, the Battle of the Bulge, the liberation of Paris, and the liberation of Belgium. Native Americans were also among the first Americans to enter Germany and played a role in the liberation of Berlin. Casualty reports showed Native Americans fighting as far away as Australia, North Africa, and Bataan. Native American soldiers were sometimes mistaken by white American soldiers for Japanese soldiers and taken prisoner or fired upon.

One of the most significant benefits that Native American men and women obtained from the war effort were the honors they received for serving including pow wows arranged prior to their deployment or upon their return. Another benefit were the new skills that could be gained that might lead to better jobs. Due to both the waning sense of isolation on reservations brought on by the war and the influx of money, Native Americans began to have access to consumer goods and services. The average Native American income increased to $2,500 by 1944, two-and-a-half times greater than in 1940. However, the average salary of a Native American was still only a quarter of the average salary of a white American.

More than 30 Native Americans were awarded the Distinguished Flying Cross, the third-highest aviation honor. Not counting the Purple Heart, more than 200 military awards were awarded to Native Americans. The most decorated Native American in the history of the United States Army is Pascal Poolaw, who, after World War II, went on the serve in the Korean War and the Vietnam War, earning a Distinguished Service Cross, four Silver Stars, five Bronze Stars, and three Purple Hearts. Although many Native Americans received recognition for their military service in terms of awards, these awards were later used during the termination period by the Bureau of Indian Affairs as proof that Native Americans were eager to assimilate into American culture.

== Navajo code talkers project ==
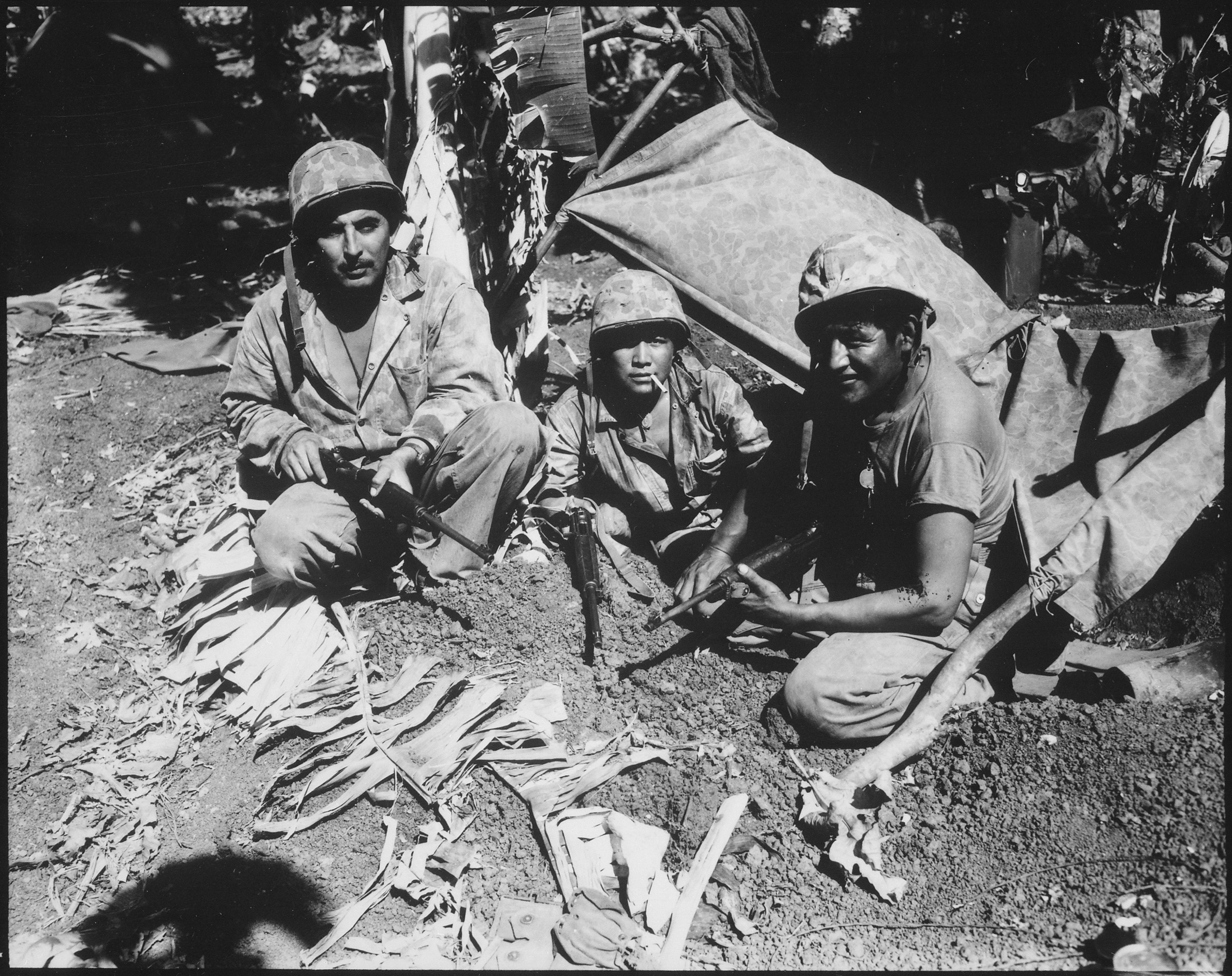
Navajo code talkers during the Battle of Saipan in 1944.

In February 1942, a civilian named Philip Johnston came up with the idea of using the Navajo language as military code. Johnston, a missionaries' son, grew up on a reservation and understood the complexity of the Navajo language. By September 1942, the American government had recruited several hundred Native Americans who spoke both Navajo and English to translate English words into the Navajo language to foil enemy understanding. Often working behind enemy lines, the code talkers were commended for their bravery and gained respect from fellow soldiers. At its declassification in 1968, the code that these Navajo developed was the only oral military code that was not broken by an enemy.

The code itself was composed of carefully selected Navajo words that used poetic circumlocution so that even a Navajo-speaker would not be able to understand the communications without training. For example, there were no words in Navajo for military machines, weapons, or foreign countries, so these words were substituted with words that did exist in the Navajo language. For example, Britain was spoken as "between waters" (toh-ta), a dive bomber was a "chicken hawk" (gini), a grenade was a "potato" (ni-ma-si) and Germany was "iron hat" (besh-be-cha-he).

In 2001, 28 Navajo Code Talkers were awarded Congressional Gold Medals, mostly posthumously. The group has also been commemorated in various media, including books, films, notably Windtalkers (2002) starring Nicolas Cage, Battle Cry starring Van Heflin, even a Navajo Code Talker GI Joe action figure.

== Postwar ==
The war's aftermath, says Alison Bernstein, marked a "new era in Indian affairs" and turned "American Indians" into "Indian Americans."

Upon returning to the US after the war, some Native American servicemen and women suffered from post-traumatic stress disorder and unemployment. Native Americans unfortunately were barred for serving their country even so simply as drinking alcohol due to older federal statues. Following the war, many Native Americans found themselves living in cities, rather than on reservations. In 1940, only five percent of Native Americans lived in cities, but by 1950, the number had ballooned to nearly 20 percent. Once Natives migrated into the cities they proved themselves by adjusting into white America and some did leave traditional cultures but did not dismiss their heritage. Additionally, they constructed a new Pan-Indian identity to cope with the differences that were perceived between themselves and white Americans.

White Americans believed after World War II it was a turning point for Natives in order to integrate them into American society. Although there were positives and negatives with one allowing for standard living, health care, education and job opportunities. On the other hand, felt less of tribal influence and threat of forfeiting the security of the reservation.

== Gallery ==
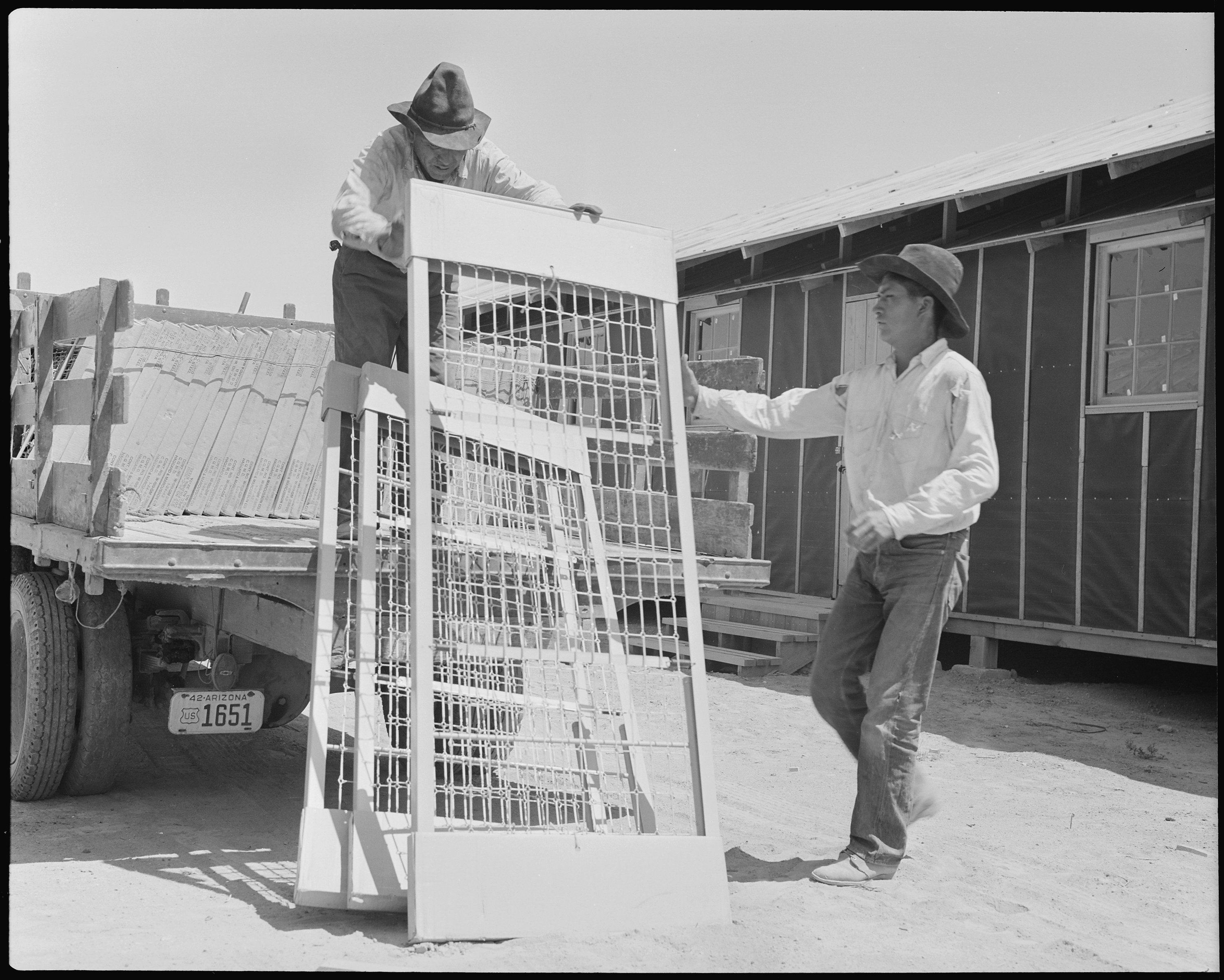
Apaches assisting in the unloading of beds for Japanese internees at the Poston War Relocation Center on April 29, 1942.

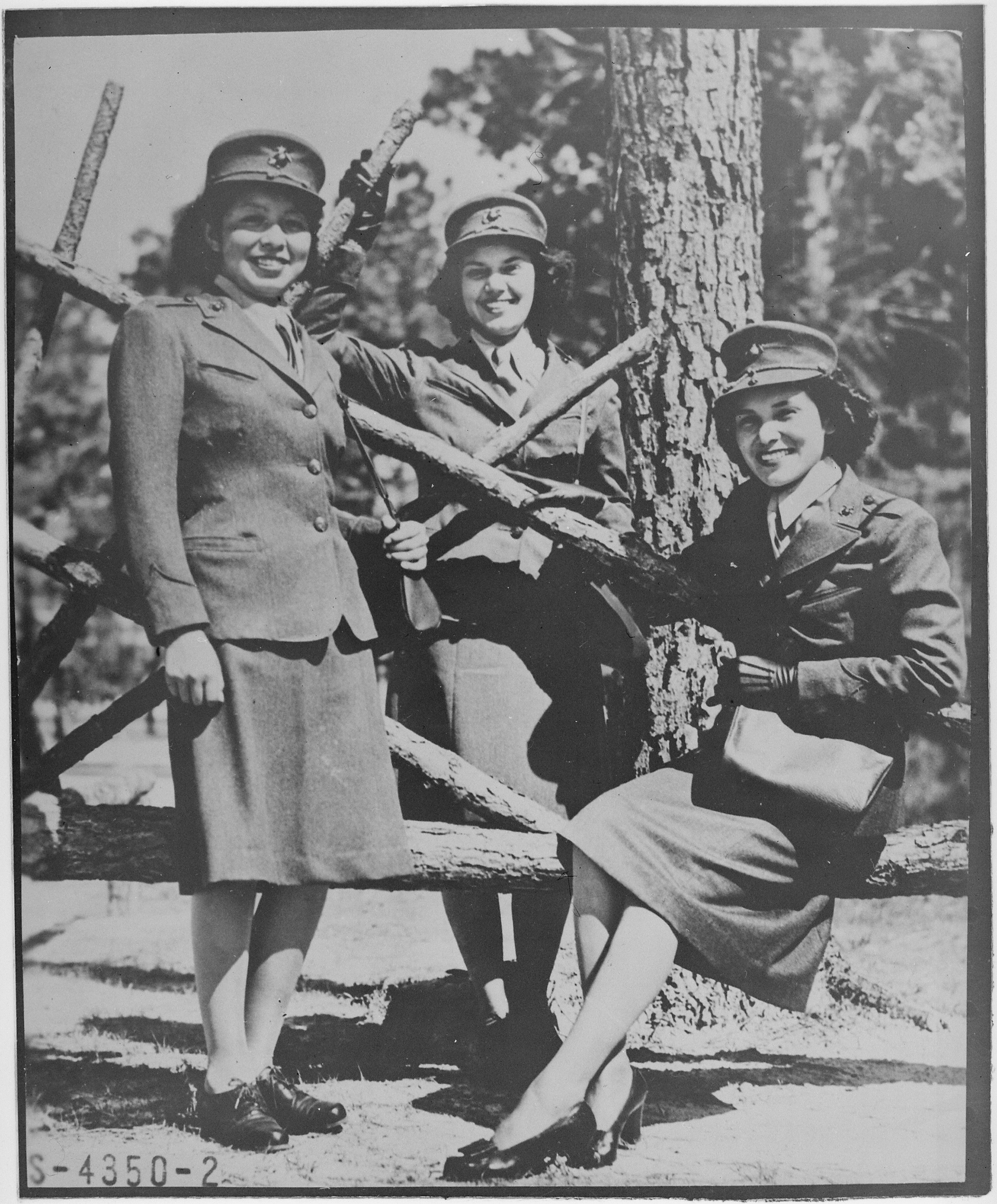
Native American women as Marine Corps Reservists at Camp Lejeune in 1943. The women here represent the Blackfeet, the Potawatomi, and the Ojibwe.

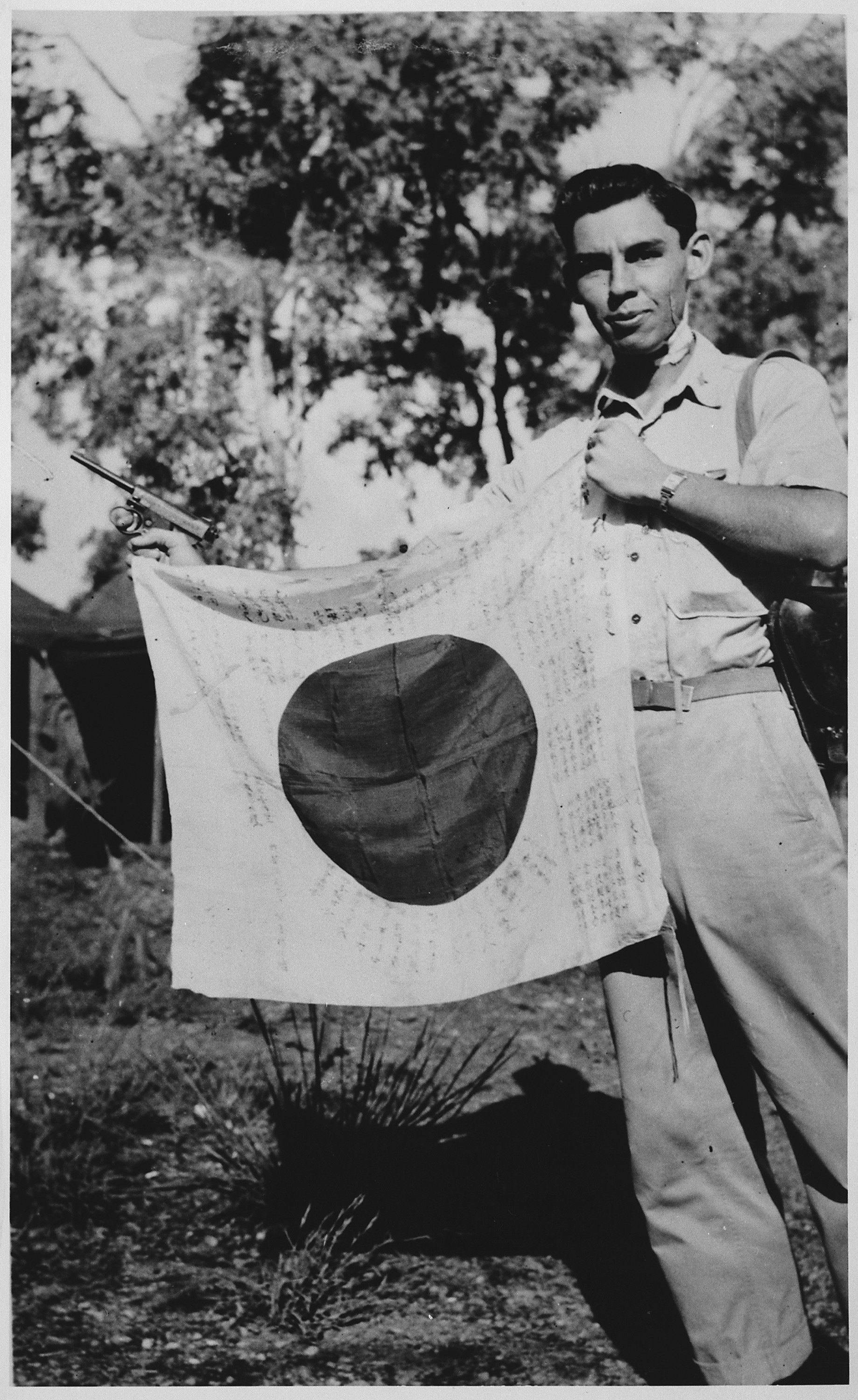
Lieutenant Woody J. Cochran, a Cherokee Indian and bomber pilot, holding up a captured Japanese flag and Nambu pistol during the New Guinea campaign on April 1, 1943.

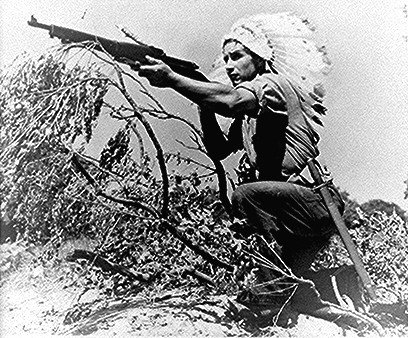
Dan Waupoose, a Menominee chief, training at Algiers, Louisiana, on August 24, 1943.

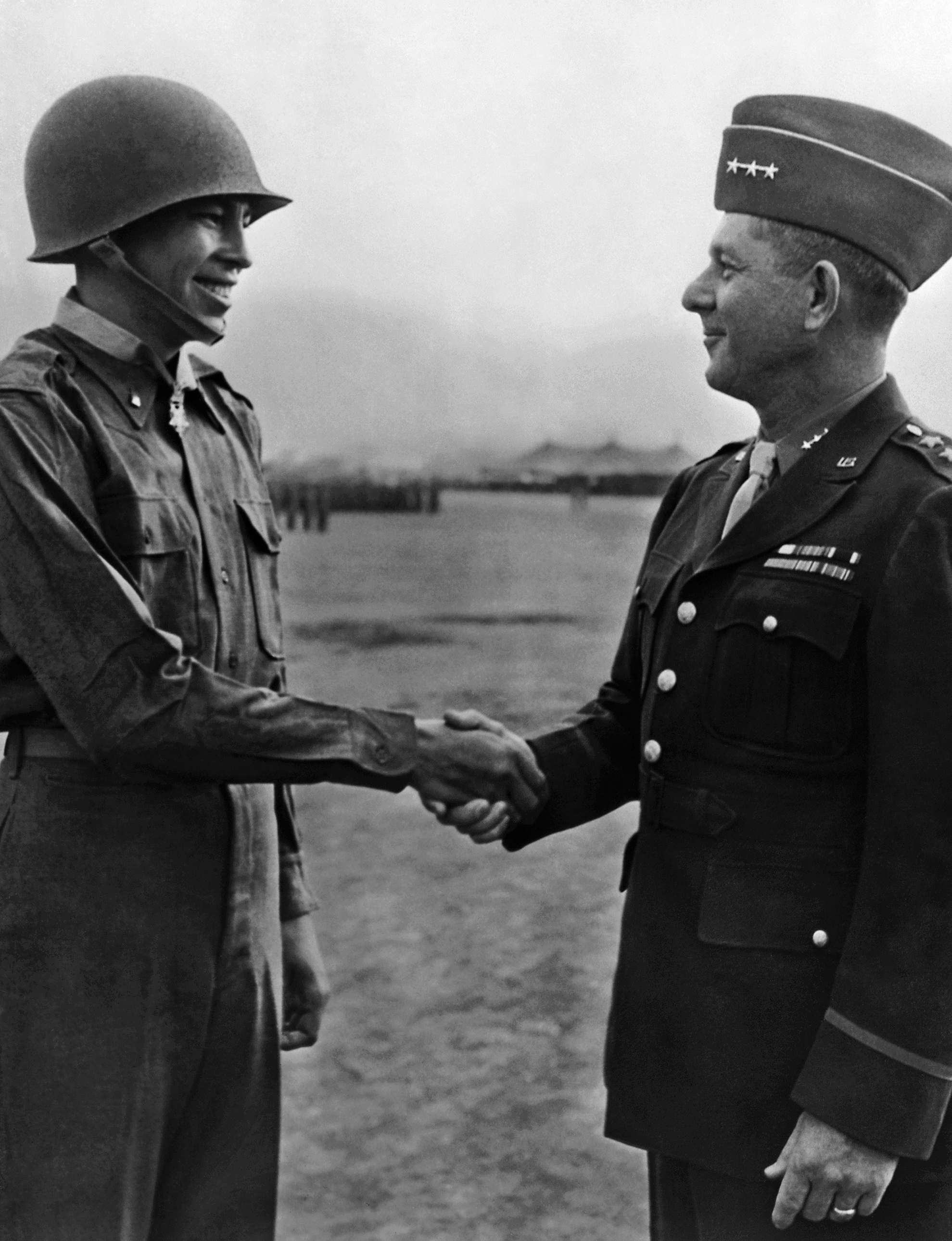
Lieutenant Ernest Childers, a Muscogee, being congratulated by General Jacob L. Devers shortly after receiving the Medal of Honor in 1944.

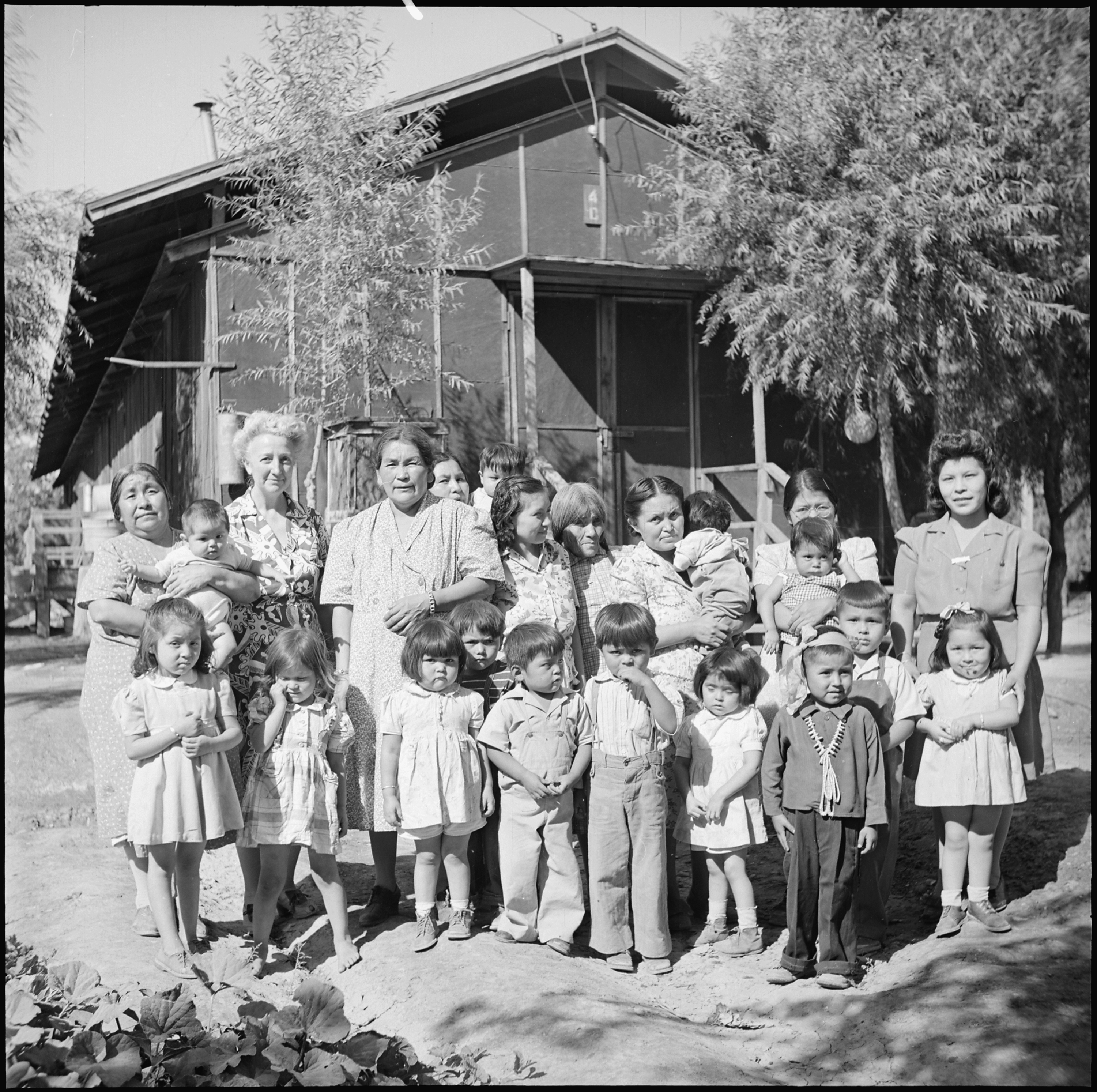
Hopi Indians at the Poston Center in September 1945, after it was turned over to the Colorado River Indian Reservation.

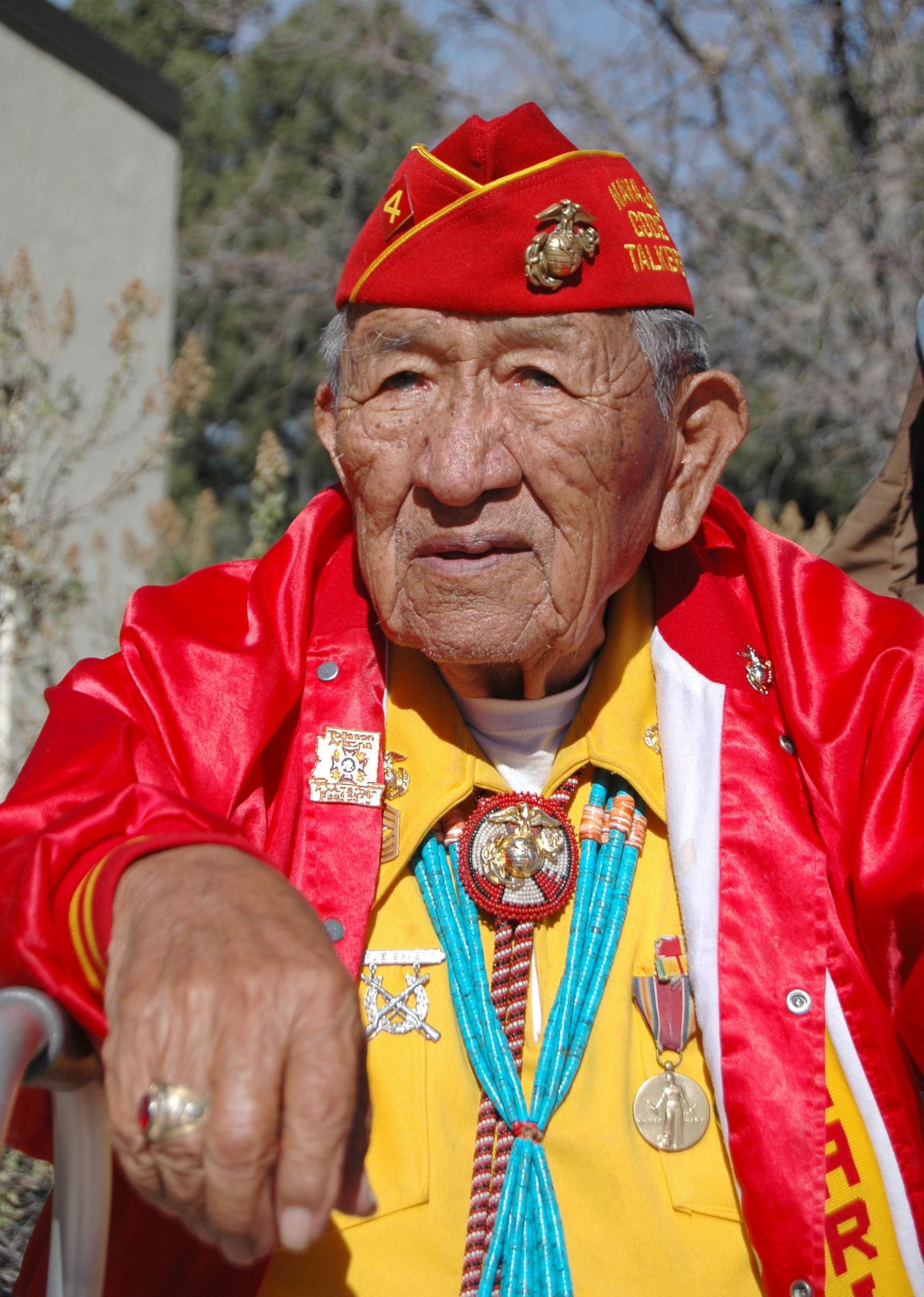
Dan Akee, a code talker from the Navajo Nation.

Percentage of Native American and Alaskan Native World War II veterans as of the 2010 US Census

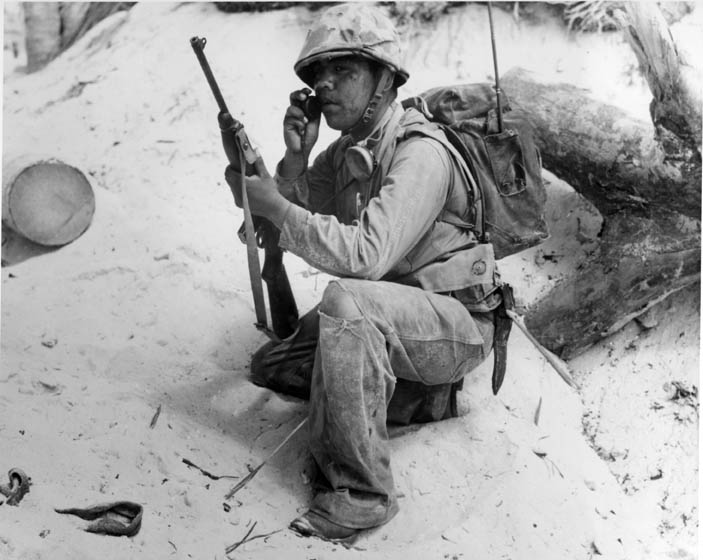
A Navajo Code Talker relays a message on a field radio. The code talkers served in the South Pacific during World War II and were kept a secret until 1968 when the Navajo code was finally declassified.

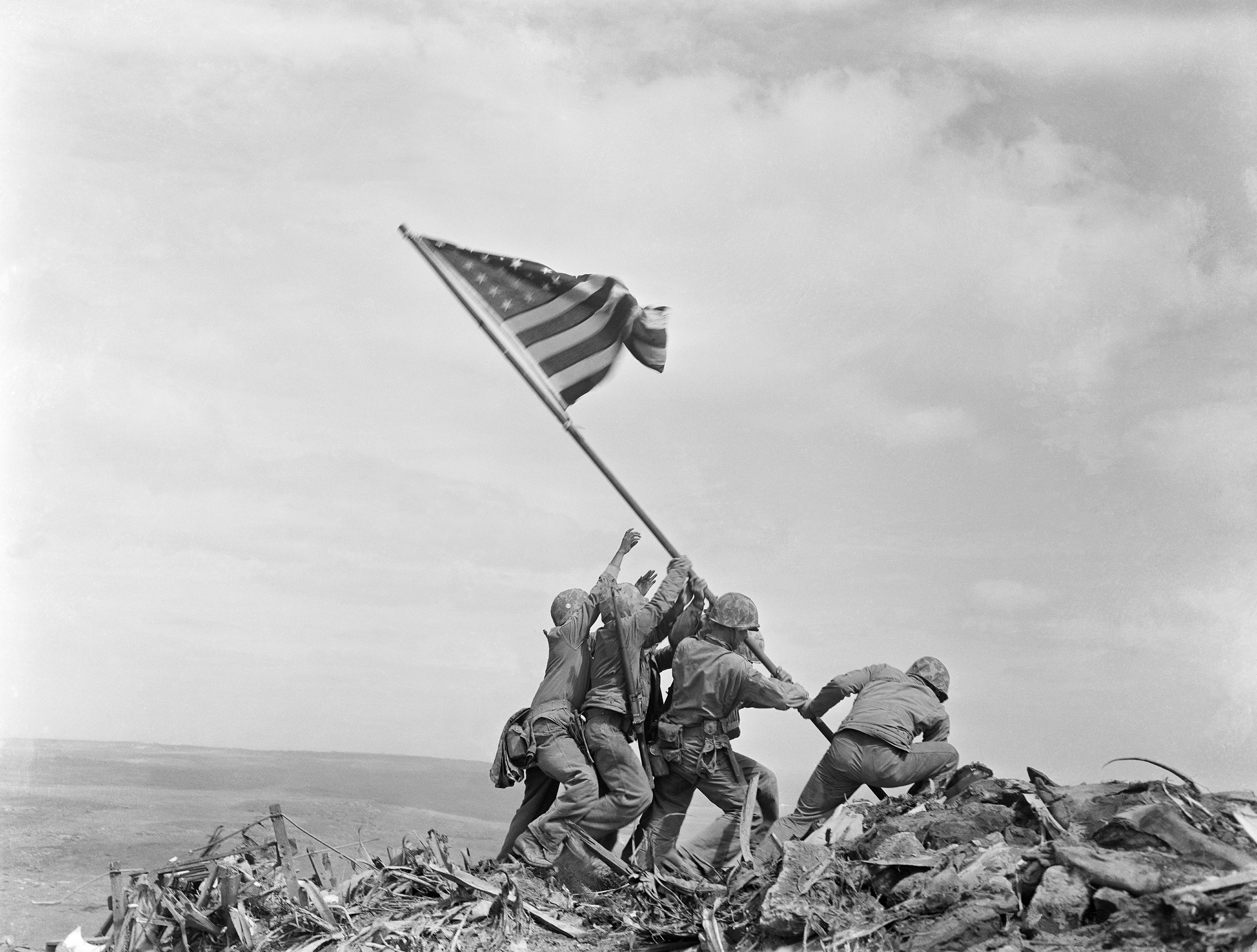
Private First Class Ira Hayes as one of the flag raisers on Mt. Suribachi.

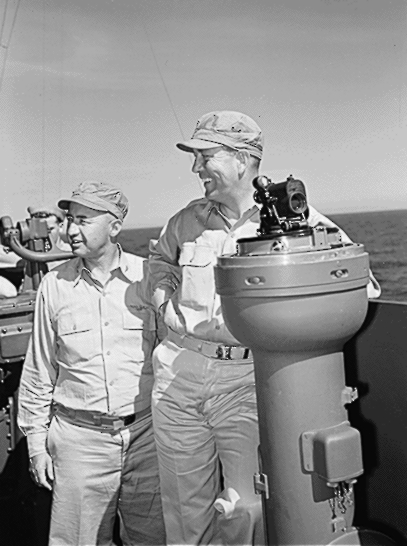
Admiral Radford with Captain Joseph "Jocko" Clark (left side) (Cherokee) on the USS Yorktown in 1943

== See also ==
- Apache Scouts - A division of the United States Army Indian Scouts
- Arizona during World War II
- Alaska Territorial Guard - A military reserve force known as the Eskimo Scouts
- Charles Norman Shay - A Penobscot Maine tribal elder who served in World War II both as a master sergeant and a certified medical technician
- Machita incident - A high-profile instance of resistance to the draft among Indians in southern Arizona
- Windtalkers - A film depicting Navajo code talkers during the war
- Native Americans in the American Civil War
- Code talker
- Joseph Medicine Crow - was a World War II veteran, serving as a scout in the 103rd Infantry Division of the U.S. Army. He received the Bronze Star Medal and the Légion d'honneur for his service during World War II. He was the last war chief of the Crow Tribe and the last Plains Indian war chief.
