= David Boies =

American lawyer (born 1941)

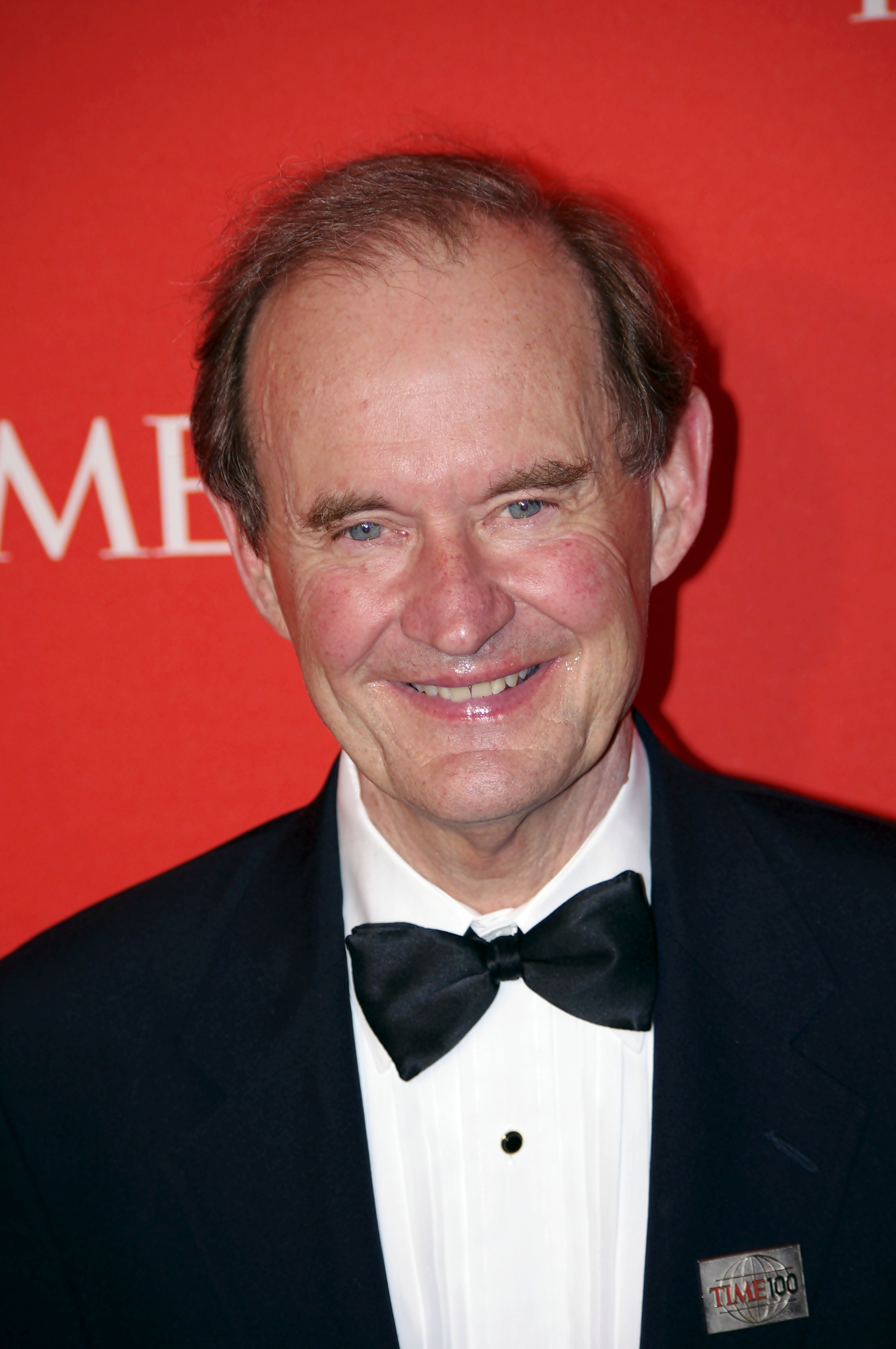
- Boies in 2011
- Born: March 11, 1941 (age 85); Sycamore, Illinois, U.S.
- Education: University of Redlands (attended); Northwestern University (BS); Yale University (JD); New York University (LLM)
- Political party: Democratic
- Spouses: Caryl Maniscalco; Mary Schuman

David Boies (/bɔɪz/ BOYZ; born March 11, 1941) is an American lawyer who is the chairman of the law firm Boies Schiller Flexner LLP. He became known for leading the U.S. federal government's successful prosecution of Microsoft in United States v. Microsoft Corp., his unsuccessful representation of Democratic presidential candidate Al Gore in Bush v. Gore, and for successful representation of the plaintiff in Hollingsworth v. Perry, which invalidated California Proposition 8 banning same-sex marriage. Boies has also represented various clients in U.S. lawsuits, including Theranos; tobacco companies; Harvey Weinstein; and Jeffrey Epstein's victims, including Virginia Roberts Giuffre.

== Early life and education ==
Boies was born in Sycamore, Illinois, to two teachers, and raised in a rural, farming community. He has four siblings. His first job was when he was 10 years old—a paper route with 120 customers. Boies has dyslexia and he did not learn to read until the third grade. Canadian journalist Malcolm Gladwell has described the unique processes of reading and learning Boies experienced due to his dyslexia. Boies' mother, for instance, would read stories to him when he was a child, and Boies would memorize them because he could not follow the words on the page.

In 1954, the family moved to California. Boies graduated from Fullerton Union High School in Fullerton, California. Boies attended the University of Redlands, in Redlands, California, from 1960 to 1962, received a B.S. degree from Northwestern University in 1964, a J.D. degree magna cum laude from Yale Law School in 1966, and an LL.M. degree from New York University School of Law 1967; he was also awarded an honorary LL.D. from the University of Redlands in 2000. He is on the board of trustees of the National Constitution Center in Philadelphia, which is a museum dedicated to the U.S. Constitution.

== Professional history ==
=== Law firm ===
Boies began his career at Cravath, Swaine & Moore, joining the firm after graduation from law school in 1966 and becoming a partner in 1973. He left Cravath in 1997 after a major client objected to his representation of the New York Yankees despite the firm having determined there was no conflict of interest. Boies departed the firm within 48 hours of being informed of the client's objection and went on to establish his own firm with his friend Jonathan Schiller, now known as Boies, Schiller & Flexner LLP. It is currently rated 23rd in "overall prestige" and 15th among New York law firms by Vault.com, a website on legal career information.

=== Notable cases ===
==== 1980s-2000 ====
From 1984 to 1985, Boies defended CBS in the libel suit Westmoreland v. CBS, but after dragging on for two years, the case was dropped. Following the 2000 U.S. presidential election, he represented Vice President Al Gore in Bush v. Gore. In Jay Roach's Recount, which focuses on the case, Boies is played by Ed Begley Jr. In his 2001 book, prosecutor and author Vincent Bugliosi criticized Boies' abilities as a trial lawyer, arguing that Boies "wasn't forceful or eloquent at all in making his points" in Bush v. Gore. "[A]lthough he seemed to have a very good grasp of the facts, he seemed completely incapable of drawing powerful, irresistible inferences from those facts that painted his opposition into a corner".

In 2000, Boies lost the first important file-sharing case which ultimately put Napster into bankruptcy.

==== 2001-2010 ====
In 2001 Boies represented the Justice Department in the United States v. Microsoft Corp. case. Boies won a victory at trial, and the verdict was upheld on appeal. The appellate court overturned the relief ordered (breakup of the company) back to the trial court for further proceedings. Thereafter, the George W. Bush administration settled the case. Bill Gates said Boies was "out to destroy Microsoft". In 2001, the Washington Monthly called Boies "a brilliant trial lawyer", "a latter-day Clarence Darrow", and "a mad genius" for his work on the Microsoft case. In 2006, Boies, Schiller & Flexner LLP negotiated a major settlement with The American International Group on behalf of its client, C. V. Starr, a firm controlled by Maurice R. Greenberg, the former chairman and chief executive of A.I.G.

In 2008 Boies negotiated on behalf of American Express two of the highest civil antitrust settlements ever for an individual company: $2.25 billion from Visa, and $1.8 billion from MasterCard.

In 2009, following the California Supreme Court ruling on Strauss v. Horton, Boies joined former Solicitor General Theodore Olson, the opposing attorney in Bush v. Gore, in the lawsuit Perry v. Brown seeking to overturn the state of California's Proposition 8 ban on same-sex marriage. In August 2010, the District Court judge ruled in their clients' favor, finding Proposition 8 to be unconstitutional. On June 26, 2013, the Supreme Court of the United States ruled that the proponents of Proposition 8 did not have standing to challenge the ruling, allowing the District Court judgment to stand. Same-sex marriages resumed in California on June 28, 2013. Also in 2009, the Golden Gate Yacht Club retained Boies for their ongoing dispute with Société Nautique de Genève regarding the 33rd America's Cup.

In March 2010, Boies joined the team of attorneys representing Jamie McCourt in her divorce from Los Angeles Dodgers owner Frank McCourt.

==== 2010s ====
In 2011 Boies represented filmmaker Michael Moore regarding a Treasury Department investigation into Moore's trip to Cuba while filming for Sicko. Boies, Schiller & Flexner LLP assisted the government in obtaining a $155 million settlement from Medco Health Solutions related to a qui tam complaint which alleged that Medco helped some pharmaceutical companies make more money by driving prescriptions to them; along with making the payment Medco also signed a corporate integrity agreement. Boies was part of the legal team representing the National Football League in their antitrust litigation, Brady v. NFL. Boies represented the National Basketball Players Association during the 2011 NBA lockout. He joined sides with Jeffrey Kessler, who opposed Boies as a representative for the players in the 2011 NFL lockout. Boies was the lead counsel for Oracle Corporation in its lawsuit against Google on the use of Java programming language technology in the Android operating system. The case decided that Google did not infringe on Oracle's patents.

In 2014, on behalf of Mr. Greenberg, Boies brought a claim that the government's $85 billion bailout of AIG had been unfair to the company's owners. Boies charged Greenberg more than $50 million in legal fees. Although the court accepted some of Boies's arguments, the court refused to award the plaintiffs a single dollar. On appeal, the United States Court of Appeals for the Federal Circuit rejected all of Boies's claims and threw out the trial court's decision.

In 2011, Boies began working as legal representation for the now defunct blood testing company, Theranos. Prior to joining their board, he worked for founder Elizabeth Holmes and her company as special adviser and attended all of the company's board meetings. In February 2016, Boies agreed to both sit on the board of directors and act as the attorney for the troubled Silicon Valley startup. The controversial dual role was deemed difficult as he would have to represent both the company (as lawyer) and investors (as a director). In the 2022 Hulu miniseries The Dropout, Boies was portrayed by Kurtwood Smith. In 2012, Boies represented three tobacco companies, Philip Morris USA Inc., R.J. Reynolds Tobacco Co. and Liggett Group LLC, in their appeal of a $2.5 million Tampa jury verdict in the death of smoker Charlotte Douglas. Later in 2012 Boies defended Gary Jackson, former president of Academi (previously known as BlackWater), in a federal prosecution which alleged he and his co-defendants illegally hid firearm purchases from the Bureau of Alcohol, Tobacco, Firearms and Explosives.

In 2015, Boies represented Bob Weinstein and Harvey Weinstein in renegotiating the Weinsteins' employment contract. According to The Wall Street Journal, Boies negotiated Harvey Weinstein's contract without informing Weinstein Co. directors that he had an investment in the company's movies. In 2017, Boies agreed to join the legal team for Lawrence Lessig's legal fight against winner-take-all Electoral College vote allocations in the states. Dallas Cowboys owner Jerry Jones hired Boies in 2017 to advise on Jones's legal strategy against NFL commissioner Roger Goodell and the NFL compensation committee in the wake of the suspension of the running back Ezekiel Elliott. Since 2019, Boies has represented several of Jeffrey Epstein's victims including Virginia Roberts Giuffre.

==== 2020s ====
In 2025, he was hired by Rumble to represent the company in its antitrust suit against Google.

In 2026, he supported the second Donald Trump administration's conduct of the 2026 Iran War.

== Criticism ==
=== Involvement in defense of Harvey Weinstein ===
In 1998, Boies helped Weinstein fend off journalist Ken Auletta's inquiry into Weinstein's alleged rape of Rowena Chiu at the Venice Film Festival. Rose McGowan claimed that Jennifer Siebel Newsom attempted to arrange a deal between her and Boies in an attempt to make her stay quiet about her allegations against Harvey Weinstein whom Boies was representing at the time. In 2017, Boies' firm reportedly directed the Israeli private intelligence company Black Cube to spy on alleged victims of Harvey Weinstein's sexual abuse and on reporters who were investigating Weinstein's actions. Over the course of a year, Weinstein had Black Cube and other agencies "target", or collect information on, dozens of individuals, and compile psychological profiles that sometimes focused on their personal or sexual histories. "Boies personally signed the contract directing Black Cube to attempt to uncover information that would stop the publication of a Times story about Weinstein's abuses, while his firm was also representing the Times, including in a libel case."

Months after Cyrus Vance Jr. dropped an investigation into a sexual assault allegation against Weinstein, he received a $10,000 donation from Boies who was representing Weinstein at the time. Andrew Cuomo opened an investigation into Vance's handling of the Weinstein probe. However, after receiving a $25,000 campaign donation from Boies' firm, Cuomo ended the investigation. Boies' firm was representing The New York Times at the same time. A few days after The New Yorker broke the story "Harvey Weinstein's Army of Spies", The New York Times announced it had "terminated its relationship" with Boies' firm. According to its contract with Weinstein, Black Cube's assignment had been to kill the paper's negative reporting on Weinstein. Boies' involvement in defending Weinstein received criticism from several magazines and newspapers, such as New York, The Atlantic, The New York Times, and Bloomberg Businessweek. In 2021, several attorneys resigned from Boies Schiller Flexner, citing Boies' defence of Weinstein as one of the reasons, along with accusations of nepotism within the firm.

=== Involvement with Theranos ===
Boies served as a lawyer for blood-testing company Theranos. His dual role as attorney and board member of the defunct company is recounted in the book Bad Blood: Secrets and Lies in a Silicon Valley Startup by then-The Wall Street Journal investigative reporter John Carreyrou. Boies, along with lawyers Heather King and Michael Brille, and his firm are described as protecting the startup using surveillance of witnesses and journalists, weaponized use of non-disclosure agreements and affidavits, intimidation tactics, and other heavy-handed practices. Boies Schiller Flexner LLP is portrayed by Carreyrou as acting as an extension of Theranos, including the use of the law firm's New York offices for hosting promotional meetings such as a faked blood test administered to Fortune writer Roger Parloff.

Boies also served on the Theranos board of directors, raising concerns about conflicts of interest. He agreed to be paid for his firm's work in Theranos stock, which he expected to increase significantly in value. Boies' participation in and support for Theranos directly contributed to the misleading treatment of Walgreen patients, potentially resulting, cited within the report on Theranos by the federal agency CMS (Centers for Medicare & Medicaid Services), in "serious injury or harm, or death". Boies eventually left the Theranos board of directors, after the U.S. federal government had initiated multiple investigations into the firm.

== Personal life ==
His first marriage, to Caryl Louise Maniscalco (née Elwell) ended in divorce. They had two children together, Caryl Louise Boies and David Boies III.

He is married to Mary Boies; they have two grown children, Mary Regency Boies and Alexander Boies, and three grandchildren. Through his daughter Mary, he is the father-in-law of Noah Emmerich.

Boies owns a home in Westchester County, New York, Hawk and Horse Vineyards in Northern California, an oceangoing yacht, and a large wine collection. Boies is dyslexic and is frequently described as having a photographic memory which allows him to recite exact text, page numbers, and legal exhibits. Colleagues attribute part of his courtroom success in part to this ability.

== Philanthropy ==
- Professorial chairs:
  - Daryl Levinson is the "David Boies Professor of Law" at New York University School of Law.
  - $1.5 million to the Tulane University Law School to establish the "David Boies Distinguished Chair in Law". Two of Boies' children earned their law degrees at Tulane.
  - A "David Boies Professor" was established at the University of Pennsylvania and is currently held by professor of history Kathleen M. Brown. The professorship is named after Boies' father, a high school teacher of government and economics.
  - A "David Boies Chair" at the Yale Law School was formerly held by Professor Robert Post before he became dean of the law school.
  - David and Mary Boies endowed a chair in government at the University of Redlands, the college that David Boies attended. Arthur Svenson currently holds this chair.
  - Mary and David Boies also endowed a "Maurice Greenberg Chair" at the Yale Law School.
- David Boies and his wife, Mary, donated $5 million to Northern Westchester Hospital, in Mount Kisco, New York. Part of an ongoing capital campaign, the Boieses' money was used to build the hospital's new emergency room.

David and Mary Boies also fund the "Mary and David Boies Fellowships" for foreign students at the Harvard Kennedy School. The Boieses give an annual picnic at their home for the incoming Teach for America corps for New York City (300–500 people). They support the Central European and Eurasian Law Institute (CEELI), a Prague-based institute that trains judges from newly democratized countries in Eastern Europe and the Middle East. There is a "Mary and David Boies Reading Room" at the CEELI Institute in Prague.

== Awards and honors ==
- Time magazine named Boies "Lawyer of the Year" in 2000.
- Boies received the Golden Plate Award of the American Academy of Achievement in 2014.
