= Noah Emmerich =

American actor (born 1965)

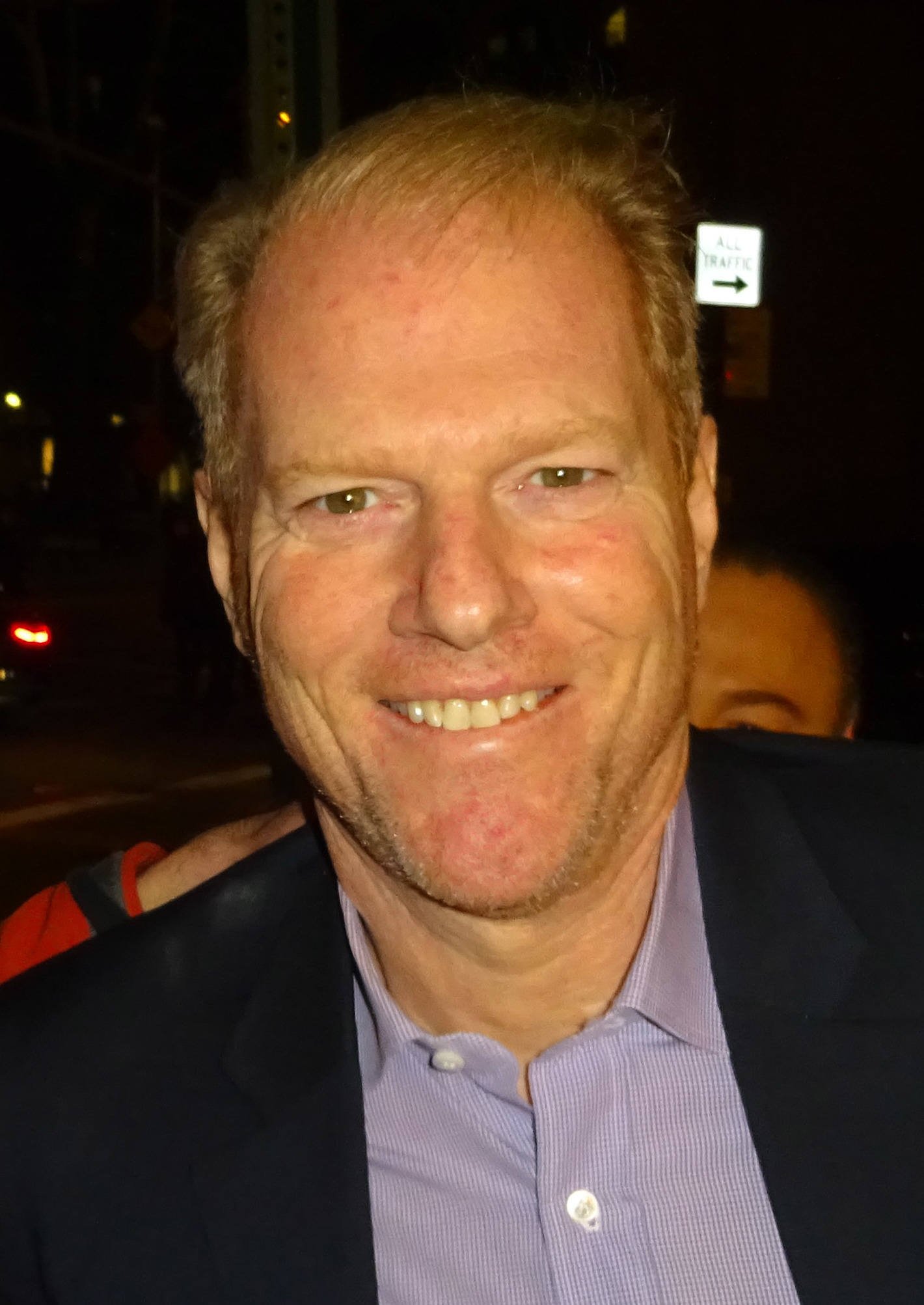
- Emmerich in 2016
- Born: Noah Nicholas Emmerich; February 27, 1965 (age 61); New York City, U.S.
- Education: Yale University
- Occupation: Actor
- Years active: 1993–present
- Spouses: Melissa Fitzgerald (m. 1998; div. 2003) Mary Regency Boies (m. 2014)

Noah Nicholas Emmerich (born February 27, 1965) is an American actor. He is best known for his roles in films such as Beautiful Girls (1996), The Truman Show (1998), Frequency (2000), Miracle (2004), Little Children (2006), and Super 8 (2011). From 2013 to 2018 he starred as FBI agent Stan Beeman on the FX series The Americans, for which he won the Critics' Choice Television Award for Best Supporting Actor in a Drama Series in 2019.

== Early life ==
Emmerich was born in New York City, the youngest of three boys. His mother, Constance, is a concert pianist; his father, André Emmerich (1924–2007), was a gallery owner and art dealer. Born in Frankfurt, Germany, André emigrated from Nazi Germany with his family, first to Amsterdam, Netherlands, then to New York in 1940. His aunt was a classmate of Anne Frank. Emmerich's family is Jewish, from Germany and France on his father's side and Hungary and Romania on his mother's. He has two older brothers: Toby Emmerich, former chairman of Warner Bros. Pictures Group from 2018 to 2022; and Adam Emmerich, a partner at Wachtell, Lipton, Rosen & Katz and co-chair of its corporate department.

Emmerich attended the Dalton School and learned to play the trumpet as a youth. He privately studied the Meisner technique of acting under Ron Stetston, an actor/director who is currently a senior member of the acting staff at the Neighborhood Playhouse in New York City. Emmerich graduated from Yale University in 1987 having received a bachelor's degree in history. He sang in the "Yale Spizzwinks(?)", an a cappella singing group which also included actor Joshua Malina.

== Career ==
=== Film ===
Emmerich had his first starring role in the film Beautiful Girls, which earned him positive reviews from audiences and critics. He had supporting roles in such movies as The Truman Show, Life and Frequency.

In the 2000s, Emmerich began starring in more dramatic films, such as Julie Johnson, Beyond Borders, Little Children, Pride and Glory. He played the main antagonist, Colonel Nelec, in J. J. Abrams's film Super 8, which earned positive reviews from critics and was a box office success. He played assistant coach Craig Patrick in the 2004 film Miracle. In 2016, Emmerich portrayed Bill Hammond in the Western Jane Got a Gun.

=== Television ===
Emmerich started his career doing guest roles in television series such as NYPD Blue and Melrose Place.

Beginning in the 2000s, he had more prominent guest roles on series such as Monk, White Collar and The Walking Dead, the last of which brought him a Saturn Award nomination. In 2021, he reprised the role in the series finale of The Walking Dead: World Beyond.

His most notable TV series role was that of FBI Agent Stan Beeman on the FX series The Americans. The series earned positive reviews, and Emmerich earned a Critics' Choice Award nomination for his performance. It ran for six seasons, ending in May, 2018. Emmerich made his directorial debut on season 3's episode 7, "Walter Taffet", and also directed episode 5 of season 4.

In September 2019, he starred in Netflix's limited series The Spy as the Israeli Mossad recruiting agent Dan Peleg.

On October 23, 2019, it was announced that he was cast as Kick Grabaston in the Netflix comedy series Space Force.

== Personal life ==
Emmerich was married to actress Melissa Fitzgerald from 1998 to 2003. On April 26, 2014, he married actress and producer Mary Regency Boies, who is the daughter of prominent lawyers David and Mary Boies at the Gramercy Park Hotel in New York. He lives in Greenwich Village, New York City.

== Filmography ==
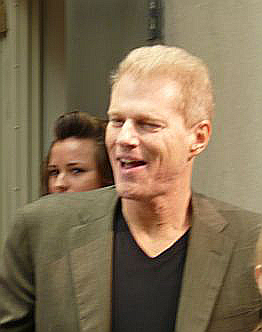
Noah Emmerich in September 2008.

=== Film ===
| Year | Title | Role | Notes |
|---|---|---|---|
| 1993 | Last Action Hero | Rookie | |
| 1994 | Laura Sobers | Dale | Short film |
| 1996 | Beautiful Girls | Michael "Mo" Morris | |
| 1997 | Cop Land | Deputy Sheriff Bill Geisler | |
| 1998 | The Truman Show | Louis Coltrane / Marlon | |
| 1999 | Life | Stan Blocker | |
| 1999 | Crazy in Alabama | Sheriff Raymond | |
| 1999 | Tumbleweeds | Vertis Dewey | |
| 2000 | Love & Sex | Eric | |
| 2000 | Frequency | Gordo Hersch | |
| 2001 | Julie Johnson | Rick Johnson | |
| 2002 | Windtalkers | Private Chick | |
| 2003 | Beyond Borders | Elliot Hauser | |
| 2004 | Miracle | Craig Patrick | |
| 2004 | Cellular | Detective Jack Tanner | |
| 2006 | Little Children | Larry Hedges | |
| 2007 | Joulutarina | Nikolas | English dub |
| 2008 | Pride and Glory | Francis Tierney Jr. | |
| 2010 | Sympathy for Delicious | Rene Faubacher | |
| 2010 | Trust | Al Hart | |
| 2010 | Fair Game | Bill Johnson | |
| 2011 | Super 8 | Colonel Nelec | |
| 2011 | Warrior | Dan Taylor | |
| 2012 | The Fitzgerald Family Christmas | Francis "FX" Xavier | |
| 2013 | Blood Ties | Lt. Connellan | |
| 2016 | Jane Got a Gun | Bill Hammond | |
| 2017 | The Wilde Wedding | Jimmy Darling | |
| 2022 | The Good Nurse | Tim Braun | |
| 2024 | The Ice Cream Man | Ernst Cahn | Short film |

=== Television ===
| Year | Title | Role | Notes |
|---|---|---|---|
| 1993 | Flying Blind | Ronald | Episode: "The Long Goodbye" |
| 1994 | NYPD Blue | Eddie | Episode: "Serge the Concierge" |
| 1994 | Jack Reed: A Search for Justice | Cop #1 | Television film |
| 1995 | Melrose Place | Sam Bennett | Episode: "Love and Death 101" |
| 1995 | If Someone Had Known | Officer Ed Hurt | Television film |
| 2000 | The West Wing | Bobby Zane | Episode: "Take This Sabbath Day" |
| 2000 | Wonderland | Johnny | Episode: "Spell Check" |
| 2005 | Sometimes in April | Lionel Quaid | Television film |
| 2005 | Law & Order: Special Victims Unit | Officer Pete Breslin | Episode: "Ripped" |
| 2009 | Monk | Roderick Brody | Episode: "Mr. Monk and the Bully" |
| 2009–2010 | White Collar | Garrett Fowler | 5 episodes |
| 2010 | The Walking Dead | Dr. Edwin Jenner | Episodes: "Wildfire" and "TS-19" |
| 2013–2018 | The Americans | Stan Beeman | 75 episodes |
| 2015 | Master of None | Mark | Episode: "The Other Man" |
| 2016, 2019 | Billions | Freddy Aquafino | 2 episodes |
| 2019 | The Hot Zone | Lt. Col. Jerry Jaax | 6 episodes |
| 2019 | The Spy | Dan Peleg | 6 episodes |
| 2020–2022 | Space Force | Kick Grabaston | 5 episodes |
| 2021 | The Walking Dead: World Beyond | Dr. Edwin Jenner | Episode: "The Last Light" |
| 2022 | Suspicion | Scott Anderson | 7 episodes |
| 2022 | Dark Winds | Leland Whitover | 6 episodes |
| 2024 | The Big Cigar | Stanley Schneider | Miniseries |
| 2025 | Murdaugh: Death in the Family | Randy Murdaugh | Miniseries; 8 episodes |

=== Director ===
| Year | Title | Notes |
|---|---|---|
| 2015–2017 | The Americans | 3 episodes |
| 2017–2018 | Billions | 2 episodes |

== Awards and nominations ==
| Year | Award | Category | Work | Result | Ref. |
|---|---|---|---|---|---|
| 2011 | Saturn Awards | Best Guest Starring Role on Television | The Walking Dead | Nominated | |
| 2013 | Critics' Choice Television Awards | Best Supporting Actor in a Drama Series | The Americans | Nominated | |
| 2019 | Critics' Choice Television Awards | Best Supporting Actor in a Drama Series | The Americans | Won | |
| 2019 | Screen Actors Guild Award | Outstanding Performance by an Ensemble in a Drama Series | The Americans | Nominated | |
