= Stoa Pitk, Arizona =

- Populated place
- Location within the state of Arizona Stoa Pitk (the United States)
- Coordinates: 32°29′06″N 112°31′01″W
- Country: United States
- State: Arizona
- County: Pima
- Elevation: 2,405 ft (733 m)
- Time zone: UTC-7 (Mountain (MST))
  - Summer (DST): UTC-7 (MST)
- Area code: 520
- FIPS code: 04-69690
- GNIS feature ID: 11846

Stoa Pitk is a populated place situated in Pima County, Arizona, United States. It has an estimated elevation of 2,405 feet (733 m) above sea level. Its name comes from Tohono Oʼodham, where it means 'white clay'.

The capture of Pia Machita during the Machita incident happened at Stoa Pitk.
