= Frequency (2000 film) =

2000 film by Gregory Hoblit

- Theatrical release poster
- Directed by: Gregory Hoblit
- Written by: Toby Emmerich
- Produced by: Gregory Hoblit; Hawk Koch; Toby Emmerich; Bill Carraro
- Starring: Dennis Quaid; Jim Caviezel; Andre Braugher; Elizabeth Mitchell; Noah Emmerich
- Cinematography: Alar Kivilo
- Edited by: David Rosenbloom
- Music by: Michael Kamen
- Distributed by: New Line Cinema
- Release date: April 28, 2000
- Running time: 118 minutes
- Country: United States
- Language: English
- Budget: $31 million
- Box office: $68.1 million

Frequency is a 2000 American science fiction thriller film starring Dennis Quaid, Jim Caviezel, Andre Braugher, Elizabeth Mitchell, Shawn Doyle, Melissa Errico, and Noah Emmerich.

Directed by Gregory Hoblit and written by Toby Emmerich, it was distributed by New Line Cinema. It also features Michael Cera in his feature film debut.

The film received generally positive reviews and grossed $68.1 million worldwide, against a budget of $31 million.

== Plot ==
In 1969, veteran firefighter Frank Sullivan dies on duty and is survived by Julia, his wife, and John, his young son. In 1999, John has become an NYPD detective and struggles with emotional openness as a result of his loss. An atmospheric phenomenon causes a broken radio in John's home to start working again, and he realizes he can communicate with Frank in 1969 through it. John forewarns his father of his imminent death, allowing Frank to avoid the accident that would have killed him in 1969.

John experiences new memories as a result of changing the past, now remembering Frank dying in 1989 from lung cancer. He shares this news with Frank in 1969, who promptly quits smoking. Changing history brings unintended side-effects: Frank's survival allowed Julia to unknowingly save the life of a serial murderer known as "the Nightingale", who now kills 10 victims, including Julia, as compared to three in the original timeline.

John shares the Nightingale's case history with Frank, allowing him to save some of the would-be victims in 1969, but the Nightingale steals Frank's driver's license and plants it on his next victim. By sequestering potential fingerprint evidence in their house, Frank passes physical information from 1969 to 1999 to help John stop the Nightingale, who is revealed to be NYPD detective Jack Shepard. Frank is arrested by his close friend Det. Satch DeLeon (John's boss in 1999) on suspicion of murder, and attempts to prove himself innocent by predicting play-by-play details of the upcoming 1969 World Series Game 5, which he heard John recount.

Frank escapes from the police station and breaks into Shepard's apartment, where he finds trophies from the murders. Shepard arrives and attacks Frank, but is seemingly killed after a scuffle and a fall into a river, allowing Julia to survive until 1999. Frank's predictions of future events prove to be accurate, letting Satch realize he was telling the truth. Satch investigates Shepard's apartment and exonerates Frank, but the police find no trace of Shepard in the river.

Frank returns home, where he and John are attacked by separate versions of Shepard in their respective times. In 1969, Frank blows off Shepard's hand with a shotgun, causing the same hand to dematerialize in 1999 as Shepard fights John. Shepard in 1969 escapes, history changes again, and a now-living Frank in 1999 comes to John's rescue, killing Shepard and resolving both time frames.

The film concludes with John happily married and with children, enjoying the company of both his aging parents, and witnessing his acquaintances benefit from future information he shared with their past selves.

== Cast ==
- Dennis Quaid as Frank Sullivan, a firefighter, John's father
- Jim Caviezel as John Sullivan, a detective
- Andre Braugher as Satch DeLeon
- Elizabeth Mitchell as Julia Sullivan, a nurse, John's mother
- Noah Emmerich as Gordo Hersch, John's best friend
- Shawn Doyle as Jack Shepard
- Jordan Bridges as Graham Gibson
- Melissa Errico as Samantha Thomas, John's ex-girlfriend

In addition, Daniel Henson and Stephen Joffe play John and Gordo, respectively, in 1969, while Dick Cavett and Brian Greene have cameo appearances as themselves, on television broadcasts.

== Production ==
The film was greenlighted for production on January 21, 1999. Sylvester Stallone was rumored to be taking the role of Frank Sullivan in 1997, but fell out of the deal after a dispute over his fee. Renny Harlin was rumored to be director on the film. Gregory Hoblit first read the script in November 1997, eighteen months after his father's death. In a 2000 interview shortly after the American release of Frequency, he described the film as "high risk" since the project had already been passed among several directors, including one of note who had twice the budget Hoblit was given. In the same interview, he described the difficulty he had finding the two leads. Hoblit realized he needed an "experienced actor" to portray Frank Sullivan and thus chose Dennis Quaid. The film was mostly shot in Toronto with some location shooting in New York City.

== Release ==
Two weeks before its release, a sneak preview of the film was shown in Final Destination.

=== Home media ===
Frequency was released on DVD on October 31, 2000 and on VHS on April 3, 2001. It was later released on Blu-ray on July 10, 2012 by Warner Home Video.

== Reception ==
=== Box office ===
Frequency was released at 2,631 theaters, making $9 million during its opening weekend and ranking third behind U-571 and The Flintstones in Viva Rock Vegas. Eventually, the film grossed $45 million domestically and $23.1 million in other territories, for a worldwide gross of $68,106,245.

=== Critical response ===
Frequency received generally positive reviews. Based on 125 reviews collected by the film review aggregator Rotten Tomatoes, the film has a 70% approval rating with an average rating of 6.9/10. The consensus reads, "A tight blend of surprises and suspense keeps audiences spellbound." On Metacritic — which assigns a weighted mean score — the film has a score of 67 out of 100 based on 32 critics, indicating "generally favorable" reviews. Audiences polled by CinemaScore gave the film an average score of "A-" on an A+ to F scale.

Roger Ebert called the film's plot "contrived", yet gave the film a favorable review. He also pointed out similarities with the films The Sixth Sense and Ghost. David Armstrong, of the San Francisco Chronicle, praised the moments in the film when John and Frank Sullivan talked to each other over the ham radio but criticized the "unintentionally funny climax." He also praised actor Shawn Doyle's performance as the Nightingale killer, calling him "convincingly creepy." Todd McCarthy of Variety magazine said despite Dennis Quaid and James Caviezel's physical separation in the film, they formed a "palpable bond that [gave] the picture its tensile strength". McCarthy noted that screenwriter Toby Emmerich's "bold leap into reconfiguring the past" created "agreeable surprises" and an "infinite number of possibilities" to the plot's direction. He added, however, that the serial killer subplot was "desperately familiar". James Berardinelli gave the film two stars out of four, criticizing the "coincidence-laden climax" but wrote that "poor writing [did] not demand subpar acting", praising Frequency's "few nice performances".

The American Radio Relay League assisted in some of the technical aspects in the film, though some ham radio enthusiasts criticized technical errors that made it into the film.

Frequency was nominated for the Hugo Award for Best Dramatic Presentation, but ultimately lost out to Crouching Tiger, Hidden Dragon. The film's ending song, "When You Come Back to Me Again", was nominated for a Golden Globe Award. Written by Jenny Yates and Garth Brooks (performed only by Brooks), the song failed to win, losing out to "Things Have Changed" from Wonder Boys.

== Television adaptations ==
In November 2014, it was reported that Supernatural showrunner Jeremy Carver was in talks to produce a new television series adaptation/reboot based on the film for television network NBC. The film's writer Toby Emmerich served as a producer for the series. NBC passed on it, and a pilot was ordered at The CW in January 2016. The series was canceled after one season on May 8, 2017.

While not a television adaptation, Frequency was briefly parodied in the Reno 911 episode "Wiegel's New Boyfriend", where the Reno officers respond to a house fire and are urged by the homeowner to "save his novel," which turns out to mirror the plot of Frequency. The Reno officers proceed to spoil the ending of the "novel" (based on them having seen the movie), causing the homeowner to suddenly become ambivalent about having his novel saved from the flames.

== See also ==
- List of films featuring time loops
- Ditto (2000 film)
