= Julie Johnson (film) =

2001 film by Bob Gosse

- DVD artwork
- Directed by: Bob Gosse
- Written by: Wendy Hammond; Bob Gosse
- Produced by: Ray Angelic
- Starring: Lili Taylor; Courtney Love; Spalding Gray; Noah Emmerich; Mischa Barton
- Cinematography: David M. Dunlap
- Edited by: David Leonard
- Music by: Angelo Badalamenti
- Production companies: Shooting Gallery; here! TV
- Distributed by: CinemaVault Releasing
- Release date: January 26, 2001 (Sundance)
- Running time: 93 minutes
- Country: United States
- Language: English

Julie Johnson is a 2001 independent American drama film directed by Bob Gosse, and written by Bob Gosse and Wendy Hammond. The film features an original score by Angelo Badalamenti as well as a soundtrack by Liz Phair. The plot focuses on a New Jersey housewife, Julie Johnson, who, after separating from her husband, falls in love with her wayward friend, Claire, and begins a relationship with her. The film stars Lili Taylor, Courtney Love, and Mischa Barton. It was released in January, 2001.

Julie Johnson debuted at the Sundance Film Festival and was shown at several film festivals worldwide between 2001 and 2004, later appearing on the here TV network as part of their films series. Courtney Love won the award for Outstanding Actress in a Feature Film for her performance from Los Angeles' Outfest in 2001.

== Plot ==
Julie Johnson is a bored New Jersey housewife who is unhappy with her life and decides to take a computer class at a local college. When her husband finds out about her return to school, he is unsupportive and verbally abusive. She decides that enough is enough, and the couple separate. Inspired, her friend Claire leaves her husband also; having nowhere to go, Claire moves in with Julie and her two children. Living together, Julie and Claire develop a relationship that is more than just a friendship. Problems arise when Julie, immersed in her studies, makes more educated friends, and Claire doesn't mesh well with them.

== Cast ==
- Lili Taylor as Julie Johnson
- Courtney Love as Claire
- Noah Emmerich as Rick Johnson
- Mischa Barton as Lisa Johnson
- Gideon Jacobs as Franky Johnson
- Spalding Gray as Mr. Miranda
- Patrick Fitzgerlad as Mike
- Donna Hanover as Catherine Miranda

== Production ==
Filming of Julie Johnson took place in June 2000 in New Jersey and New York City, with some filming occurring in Fort Greene, Brooklyn.

Taylor was cast in the title role, and felt that her character was "basically asleep, and then the tension builds and she breaks. This story reminds me of the fairy tale called The Handless Maiden, and for a while I imagined her without hands, as someone incomplete." Courtney Love was inspired to take the role of Claire after becoming acquainted with several LGBT people who had not come out: "I grew up on the West Coast with hippies, where if people were gay, they were gay," Courtney Love recalled in 2000. "No big deal. But then a couple of years ago, when I started getting projected more into the mainstream and having to deal with mainstream American values and not really understanding it, I started to meet people who weren't out, who weren't resolved with it, and that's the majority of people who live in this country. And I started to have a lot more compassion for the fact that they can't come out, because it's not that easy."

== Release ==
Julie Johnson premiered at the Sundance Film Festival on January 26, 2001.

=== Critical response ===
Andy Bailey of IndieWire deemed the film "well-intentioned but disastrously executed" despite praising the central performances. Dennis Harvey of Variety praised the performances of Taylor and Love, but ultimately deemed the film a "limp inspirational drama that lifts its premise whole from Good Will Hunting, then filters that through telepic-ish housewife-empowerment cliches." Time Out wrote: "There are some sweet, simmering moments between the two women as both Taylor and Love breathe life into an unlikely script."
