= Julie Johnson (author) =

American writer (born 1991)

Julie Johnson near her home off the coast of Massachusetts.

Julie Johnson (born July 3, 1991) is an American writer based in the Boston area. Johnson is the No. 1 Sunday Times bestselling author of The Wind Weaver, the first book in the internationally acclaimed Reign of Remnants Trilogy, which is published in more than 20 languages worldwide.

Before her romantic fantasy debut, Johnson was widely known for writing contemporary romance novels set in her home state of Massachusetts, including the Witch City series and the Boston Love Stories series.

== Career ==
Johnson was born in Nahant, Massachusetts, where she spent her childhood. In December 2013, Johnson obtained a BA honors from University of Delaware with degrees in Mass Communications and Psychology from the College of Arts and Sciences. In 2013, Julie published her first novel Like Gravity. After the publication of her first novel, Johnson graduated with honors from University of Delaware.

Johnson is the author of more than 20 novels. Her books have been published in dozens of foreign territories, and subsequently charted on many international bestseller lists. Her romantic fantasy debut THE WIND WEAVER took the No.1 spot on the UK's Sunday Times bestseller list, as well as the No.2 spot on Germany's Spiegel list.

On January 23, 2024, an announcement in the literary trade publication Publisher's Marketplace revealed Johnson's new romantic fantasy trilogy had been acquired in a three-book deal by fifteen different publishers worldwide, many at auction. Publishers include Penguin Random House in the United States at the Berkley Ace Books imprint, and Penguin Books in the United Kingdom at imprint Michael Joseph. International publishers include: Ullstein (Germany), Galera (Brazil), Harper Italia (Italy), Hugo (France), Anaya (Spain), Alexandra (Hungary), Penguin Random House Portugal (Portugal), Zysk (Poland), Ahavot (Israel), Motyl (Slovakia), TREI (Romania), and Albatros (Czech Republic). Johnson is represented by Bookcase Literary Agency.

Paste Magazine exclusively revealed the official cover art for book one in the trilogy, THE WIND WEAVER, on July 9, 2024, along with an interview with Johnson about the new series. In multiple interviews, Johnson has cited Welsh mythology along with the song 'Rhiannon' by American musician Stevie Nicks of Fleetwood Mac as the initial inspiration for her characters.

== Awards ==
In October 2025, Johnson was awarded the prestigious MEILLEURE ROMANCE ÉTRANGÈRE award at the Festival New Romance in Le Havre, France, in recognition of THE WIND WEAVER's success in the French publishing market.

== Selected novels ==
- Like Gravity, (2013)
- Say the Word, (2014)
- Foreign Affairs, (2014)
- Not You It's Me, (2015)
- Cross the Line, (2015)
- Love & Lies, (2016)
- One Good Reason, (2016)
- The Monday Girl, (2016)
- The Someday Girl, (2017)
- Take Your Time, (2017)
- Uncharted, (2018)
- Faded: Part One (2018)
- Faded: Part Two (2018)
- So Wrong It's Right (2018)
- Silver Crown (2019)
- Golden Throne (2019)
- Diamond Empire (2020)
- We Don't Talk Anymore (2020)
- We Don't Lie Anymore (2020)
- Bad Luck Charm (2023)
- At Last Sight (2024)
- The Wind Weaver (2025)
- The Sea Spinner (2026)
- The Realm Reaper (2027)

== Other websites ==
- Official website
- Reactor Mag
- ScreenRant
- WinterIsComing
- The Nerd Daily
- OutSFL
- Parade
- Hugo Publishing
