= Julie A. Johnson =

American clinical pharmacist

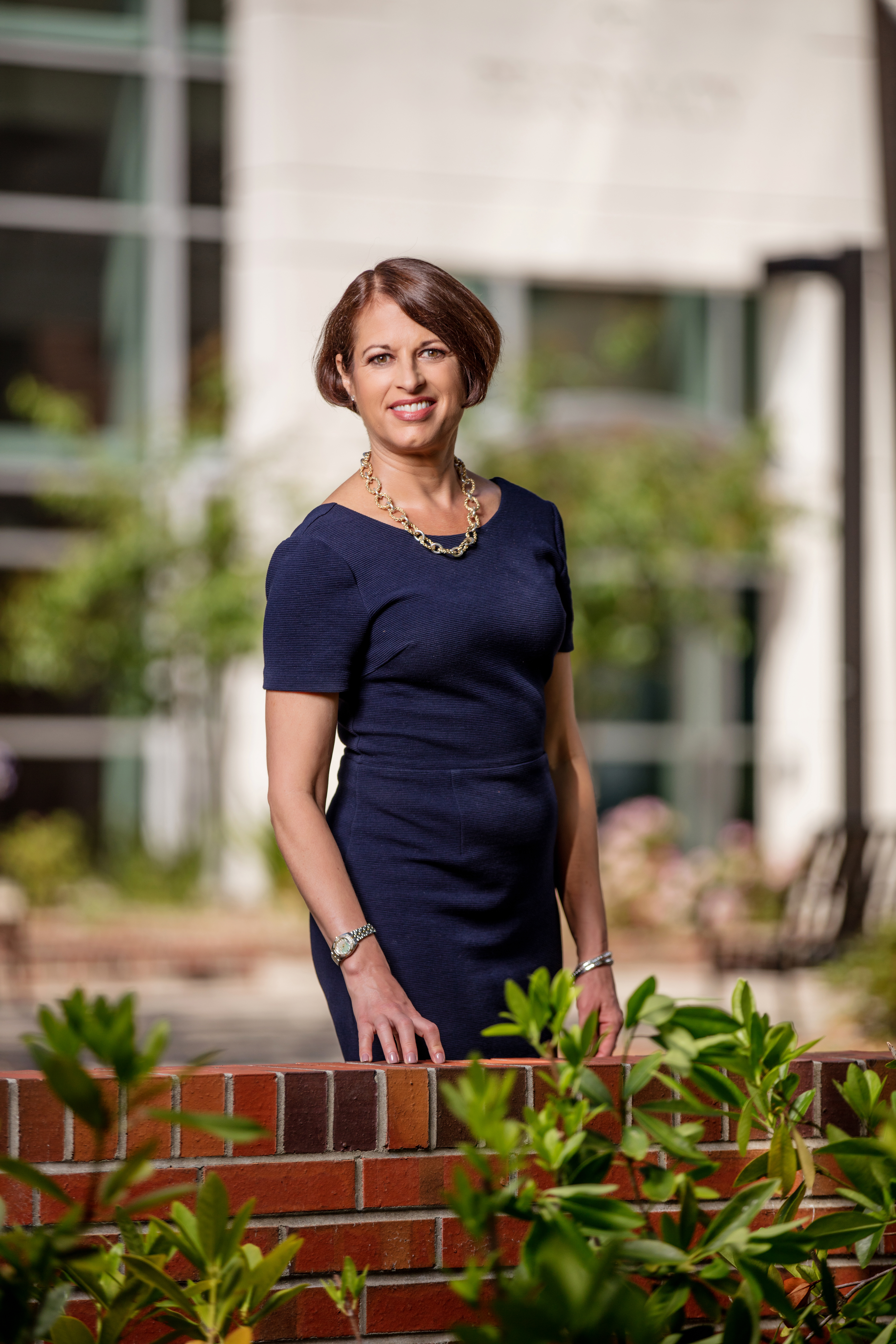
- Born: 1962 (age 63–64) (Note: In 2003, Johnson was reported to be 41); Greenville, Ohio, USA
- Spouse: John J. Lima
- Children: 2

Academic background
- Education: Ohio State University; University of Texas Health Science Center at San Antonio

Julie Ann Johnson (born 1962) is an American clinical pharmacist and translational scientist. She currently serves as associate dean for clinical and translational research and holds the Dr. Samuel T. and Lois Felts Mercer Professorship of Medicine and Pharmacology at Ohio State University College of Medicine. She is also associate vice president for research at Ohio State.

At the University of Florida College of Pharmacy, Johnson was dean emeritus of pharmacy and a distinguished professor in the Department of Pharmacotherapy & Translational Research.

== Early life and education ==
A native Ohioian, Johnson earned her Bachelor of Science at Ohio State University and her Doctor of Pharmacy degree at the University of Texas Health Science Center at San Antonio. Upon completing her doctorate degree, Johnson completed her Postdoctoral Fellowship in Pharmacokinetics/Clinical Pharmacology at Ohio State.

== Career ==
Upon completing her Postdoctoral Fellowship, Johnson spent nine years as a faculty member at the University of Tennessee College of Pharmacy.

Johnson joined the faculty at the University of Florida College of Pharmacy in 1998 and was shortly thereafter appointed professor of pharmacy and medicine in cardiology. Her research focuses on the relationship between genetics and drug response, with the aim of assisting doctors in properly prescribing medications. She has been continuously funded by the National Institutes of Health or the American Heart Association since 1990. Her research has focused on the pharmacogenetics and clinical pharmacology of warfarin and medications used to treat high blood pressure, particularly beta-adrenergic receptor blockers and thiazide diuretics. More recently her research has extended to focus on the clinical implementation and clinical outcomes associated with using genetic information to guide drug therapy in cardiovascular disease, pain management and other diseases. In 2004, she was appointed the V. Ravi Chandran, Ph.D. Professor in Pharmaceutical Sciences and named to the editorial staff of the journal Clinical Pharmacology & Therapeutics.

In 2010, Johnson led the International Warfarin Pharmacogenetics Consortium which aimed at developing a way to use genetic information from patients to help doctors better determine optimal warfarin doses. In 2013, Johnson led a research team which found that a genetic variation in African Americans directly affected their responses to the drug Warfarin. She analyzed health information and DNA samples from over 500 African-American adults on stable doses of warfarin to identify additional genetic factors. Her team concluded that African American adults who carry one or two copies of polymorphism need a dose reduction of roughly 7–9 mg less per week than other patients. During the same year, Johnson became the first woman to hold the title of Dean of the University of Florida College of Pharmacy and the seventh dean overall.

As a result of her academic achievements and research, Johnson was elected a Member of the National Academy of Medicine in October 2014. She is also an elected fellow of the American College of Clinical Pharmacy, the American Heart Association and the American College of Clinical Pharmacology. Johnson has served as the principal investigator and the director of the UF Health Precision Medicine Program studying genetic relations to medicine. In March 2015, she was elected president-elect of the American Society for Clinical Pharmacology and Therapeutics and served on its executive committee.

From 2015 to 2017, Johnson was a Clarivate Analytics Highly Cited Researcher in Pharmacology and Toxicology, indicating she was one of "the world's leading scholars in the sciences and social sciences." In 2018, she was recognized as an influencer across several fields during the last decade beyond the pharmacology and toxicology category. She also leads one of the funded groups in the NIH's genomic medicine implementation network, called IGNITE, for which she was inaugural chair of its steering committee.

In October 2023 Johnson was appointed director of The Ohio State University CCTS and will serve as the PI of a seven-year $37.9 million Clinical and Translation Science Award from the NIH. Johnson also serves as associate dean for Clinical and Translational Research in The Ohio State University College of Medicine and as associate vice president of Research for The Ohio State University.

Johnson has written more than 330 original research articles and secured more than $90 million in research funding as principal investigator.

== Awards and honors ==
In recognition of her significant contributions to pharmacy and medicine, Johnson has earned many distinguished awards. The notable honors include:

- In 2007, Johnson received the American Association of Colleges of Pharmacy's Paul R. Dawson Biotechnology Award "for her contributions to contemporary teaching and scholarship in biotechnology."
- Johnson was presented the Therapeutic Frontiers Award by the American College of Clinical Pharmacy in 2009
- In 2014, Johnson was elected a member of the National Academy of Medicine, which was the first ever for a faculty member in the UF College of Pharmacy.
- Johnson was the recipient of the 2015 Distinguished Scientist Award from the Southeastern Universities Research Association for her "collaborative leadership and commitment to excellence."
- In 2016, Johnson was awarded the Volwiler Research Achievement Award from the American Association of Colleges of Pharmacy, considered the highest research award in academic pharmacy.
- Johnson received the 2019 Paul F. Parker Medal from the American College of Clinical Pharmacy "based on her contributions furthering the professional role of pharmacists and her visionary leadership."
- Also in 2019, Johnson was named the American College of Clinical Pharmacology Distinguished Investigator Award winner to recognize superior scientific expertise and accomplishments by a senior investigator
- In 2020, Johnson was elected a Fellow for the American Association for the Advancement of Science.
- Johnson was awarded the 2021 Rawls-Palmer Progress in Medicine Award from the American Society for Clinical Pharmacology and Therapeutics.
- Also in 2021, The Precision Medicine World Conference presented Johnson with its Luminary Award.

== Personal life ==
Johnson and her husband John J. Lima have two children.
