= Kelly AuCoin =

American actor

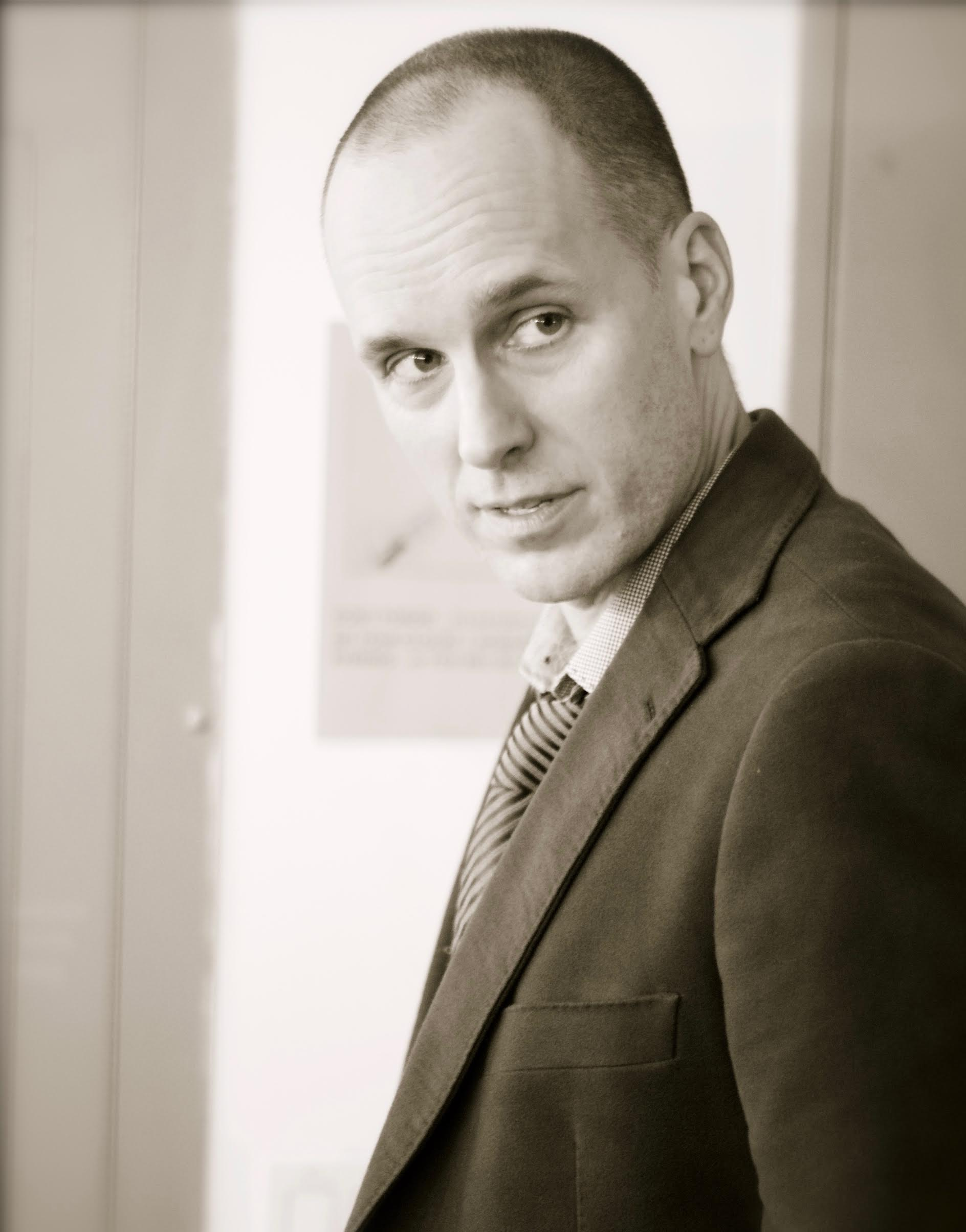
- AuCoin in 2016
- Born: February 14, 1967 (age 59); Hillsboro, Oregon, U.S.
- Occupation: Actor
- Years active: 1990–present
- Spouse: Carolyn Hall (m. 1999)

Kelly AuCoin (born February 14, 1967) is an American actor who has appeared in film, television, and theater. He is best known as "Dollar" Bill Stearn on Billions (Showtime) and Pastor Tim on The Americans (FX). He has had recurring roles on several other American television series, including The Girl from Plainville (Hulu), WeCrashed (Apple TV+), The Endgame (NBC), House of Cards (Netflix), and as Hercules Mulligan on the final season of Turn: Washington's Spies (AMC). He frequently appears on stage in New York and venues around the country, such as Manhattan Theatre Club, Signature Theatre, Playwrights Horizons, the Oregon Shakespeare Festival and La Jolla Playhouse. He has had supporting roles in many films, including Steven Spielberg's The Post, The Good House, False Positive, The Kingdom, Julie & Julia, and All That I Am, which won the SXSW Special Jury Award for Ensemble Acting.

== Early life ==
AuCoin was born in the Portland suburb of Hillsboro, Oregon, the son of Les and Susan AuCoin, and grew up in Oregon and Washington, D.C., where his father served as a United States Congressman from 1975 to 1993. His first appearance on television was in one of his father's campaign commercials, in which he countered claims that his father was a tax-and-spend Democrat by washing the family car to illustrate how cheap his father actually was. AuCoin is a graduate of Georgetown Day School and Oberlin College.

== Career ==
=== Television ===
Upon arriving in New York, AuCoin landed small roles in several soap operas, including Guiding Light and The City. In the early 2000s, AuCoin appeared in episodes of The Sopranos and the first of many episodes of Law & Order. His breakthrough came in 2014, when he landed recurring roles in Netflix's House of Cards, The Americans, and, most importantly, as the rabidly loyal - and notoriously cheap - cult favorite, "Dollar" Bill Stearn, on the Showtime series Billions. He has also appeared in other television series, such as The Bold Type, in which he played Jane Sloan's father during the show's final season, Madam Secretary, the NBC miniseries The Slap, Unforgettable, Person of Interest, Forever, The Following, Elementary, The Good Wife, White Collar, Gossip Girl, Blue Bloods, among others. He played the regular recurring role of Peter Keatch in the CBS series Waterfront, which was canceled before ever airing, despite having shot five episodes.

He appeared in 2024 in an episode of Law & Order.

For the 2012 presidential election, NPR's Planet Money team cast AuCoin as their "Fake Presidential Candidate" to give voice to "major economic policies they could all stand behind."

=== Film ===
His first major film role came in 2007, where he played State Department official Ellis Leach in The Kingdom. In 2009's Julie & Julia, AuCoin played one of the executives for the Houghton Mifflin publishing company who declined to publish Julia Child's soon-to-be-legendary cookbook. More recently he has appeared in False Positive, starring and written by Ilana Glazer, Complete Unknown, starring Rachel Weisz, Barry Levinson's The Wizard of Lies, starring Robert De Niro, Drunk Parents, starring Alec Baldwin and Selma Hayek, and The Good House, starring Sigourney Weaver and Kevin Kline.

=== Theater ===
In 2005, AuCoin appeared as Octavius in a Broadway revival of Julius Caesar, which starred Denzel Washington. AuCoin has appeared in numerous other Off-Broadway stage productions, including Manhattan Theatre Club's productions of Of Good Stock and Long Lost, and Signature Theatre's 2014 revival of A. R. Gurney's The Wayside Motor Inn, directed by Lila Neugebauer, which won him, and the rest of the cast, a special Drama Desk Award for "Outstanding Ensemble". Other Off Broadway productions include 2008's premiere of Ernest Hemingway's The Fifth Column, 2009's Jailbait, by Deirdre O'Connor, directed by Suzanne Agins, 2010's Happy Now?, by Lucinda Coxon, the 2013 premiere of Tanya Barfield's The Call, directed by Leigh Silverman in a joint production by Primary Stages and Playwrights Horizons, He recently starred in two La Jolla Playhouse productions; J. T. Rogers' Blood And Gifts, directed by Lucie Tiberghien, and Arthur Kopit and Anton Dudley's world premier A Dram Of Drummhicit, directed by Christopher Ashley. AuCoin was a member of the Oregon Shakespeare Festival acting company in the early 1990s.

== Personal life ==
AuCoin is married to dancer Carolyn Hall, winner of a 2002 Bessie Award for creative work in dance performance. The couple resides in Brooklyn, New York.

== Filmography ==
Film
Year	Title	Role	Director	Notes
1998	A Perfect Murder	Snarky Waiter at Met	Andrew Davis	
1999	Fare Well Miss Fortune	Ben Harrison	Mickey Faust	
2003	A Normal Life	Josh	Dewey Moss	
2003	Love & Stuff	Simon	Sorrel Brae	
2005	A Perfect Fit	Brian	Ron Brown	
2007	The Kingdom	Ellis Leach	Peter Berg	
2007	Serial	Peter Brown	Kevin Arbouet & Larry Strong	
2007	Ghosts of the Heartland	Wellman	Allen Blumberg	
2009	Julie & Julia	Houghton Mifflin Executive	Nora Ephron	
2010	Consent	Mister E.	Ron Brown	
2010	Rocksteady	Dick Hefferd	Mustapha Khan	
2011	The Music Never Stopped	Dr. Gilbert	Jim Kohlberg	
2013	All That I Am (originally titled Burma)	Alan	Carlos Puga	SXSW Special Jury Award for Ensemble Acting
2013	The Word	Sean Higgins	Greg Friedle	
2016	Benji The Dove	Jason	Kevin Arbouet	
2016	Complete Unknown	Dave	Joshua Marston	
2017	The Post	AAG Kevin Moroney	Steven Spielberg	
2019	Drunk Parents	Tyler Rector	Fred Wolf	
2021	False Positive	Dirk	John Lee	
2021	The Good House	Brian McAllister	Maya Forbes & Wallace Wolodarsky	
2022	Unworthy	Warren	Adam Bernstein	Short
2023	The Holdovers	Hugh Cavanaugh	Alexander Payne	
2026	Samo Lives	Robert Farris Thompson	Julius Onah	

Television
Year	Title	Role	Notes
1996	The City	Mark	Episode: "Episode dated 11 November 1996"
1996	Guiding Light	Doug	Episode: "#1.12642"
1998	Law & Order	First Assistant	Episode: "Tabloid"
2000	Law & Order	Pat Callister	Episode: "Mega"
2001	Law & Order	Rich Porter	Episode: "Who Let the Dogs Out?"
2002	New Americans	Brian	TV film
2004	The Sopranos	Agent Jim Ashe	Episode: "Rat Pack"
2004	Third Watch	Jeff Weaver	Episode: "More Monsters"
2006	Law & Order	Andrew Semel	Episode: "Family Friend"
2006	Good God	Managing-Archangel Michael	Miniseries
2006	Waterfront	Peter Keatch	Recurring; Canceled before airing
2008	Without a Trace	Nick Selat	Episode: "22 x 42"
2009	Kings	Serviceman Lawrence	Episode: "Pilgrimage"
2009	The Good Wife	Carl Thomas	Episode: "Unprepared"
2010	White Collar	Arthur Landry	Episode: "Hard Sell"
2010	Gossip Girl	Doug Jarrett	Episode: "The Sixteen-Year-Old Virgin"
2010	Law & Order: Criminal Intent	Dr. Shelly Springe	Episode: "The Mobster Will See You Now"
2011	Body of Proof	Mike Walsh	Episode: "Talking Heads"
2011	Untitled Jersey City Project	Ray Harrison	Series lead
2012	Blue Bloods	Jack Cavanaugh	Episode: "Whistle Blower"
2013	Elementary	Grey Suit	Episode: "The Red Team"
2013	The Following	Phil Gray	Episode: "The End is Near"
2014	Unforgettable	Alpha Omega	Episode: "Omega Hour"
2014	Person of Interest	Langdon	Episode: "A House Divided"
2014	The Actress	The Groom	Episode: "The Wedding"
2014–2018	The Americans	Pastor Tim	Recurring
2015	House of Cards	Gary Stamper	Recurring, season 3
2015	The Slap	Tony	Miniseries
2015	Madam Secretary	Greg Taylor	Episode: "The Ninth Circle"
2015	Forever	Frank Ferrell	Episode: "Punk is Dead"
2016	Conviction	David Porter	Episode: "The 1% Solution"
2016	The Blacklist	Benjamin Stalder	Recurring, season 3
2016–2023	Billions	"Dollar" Bill Stearn	Series regular, 69 episodes
2017	Turn: Washington's Spies	Hercules Mulligan	Recurring, season 4
2017	The Wizard of Lies	FBI Agent Ted Cacioppi	HBO film
2020–2021	The Bold Type	Warren Sloan	Recurring
2022	The Girl from Plainville	Scott Gordon	Recurring
2022	WeCrashed	Scott Galloway	Recurring
2022	The Endgame	Reed Doblin	Episode: "Pilot"
2022	New Amsterdam	Superintendent Davis	Episode: "Truth Be Told"
2022	Law & Order: Special Victims Unit	Father Colin Regis	Episode: "Confess Your Sins to Be Free"
2022	Super Pumped	Jeff Bezos	Cameo (uncredited)
2024	Elsbeth	Declan Armstrong	2 episodes
2024	Law & Order	Alan Wallace	Episode: "In Harm’s Way"
2024	Clipped	Andy Roeser	Series regular
2025	The Greatest	Joe Martin	Recurring

Theater
Year	Title	Playwright	Role	Director	Venue	Notes
1990	The Subject Was Roses	Frank D. Gilroy	Timmy	Alan Nause	Artists Repertory Theatre	
1990	A Lie of the Mind	Sam Shepard	Frankie	Alana Lipp	Storefront Theater	
1991	Coyote Ugly	Lynn Seifert	Dowd	Alana Lipp	Firehouse Theater	
1992	The Fire Raisers	Max Frisch	Fireman #3	Barbara Damashek	Oregon Shakespeare Festival	
1993	A Midsummer Night's Dream	William Shakespeare	Lysander	Cynthia White	Oregon Shakespeare Festival	
1993	The White Devil	John Webster	Lodovico	Jerry Turner	Oregon Shakespeare Festival	
1994	The Destiny of Me	Larry Kramer	Benjamin Weeks	Shashin Desai	International City Theatre	
1995	Henry IV, Part 2	William Shakespeare	Prince Hal	John Sipes	Illinois Shakespeare Festival	
1995	Cymbeline	William Shakespeare	Iachimo	Cal MacLean	Illinois Shakespeare Festival	
1996	Romeo and Juliet	William Shakespeare	Romeo	Tim Gregory	Texas Shakespeare Festival	
1996	The School for Wives	Molière	Horace	Paul Gaffney	Texas Shakespeare Festival	
1996	1776	Sherman Edwards; Peter Stone	Charles Thomson	Kathy Barber	Texas Shakespeare Festival	
1997	Twelfth Night	William Shakespeare	Orsino	Kathy Barber	Texas Shakespeare Festival	
1997	Henry V	William Shakespeare	Dauphin	Eve Adamson	Texas Shakespeare Festival	
1998	Arcadia	Tom Stoppard	Septimus Hodge	George Black	Virginia Repertory Theatre	
1999	Quills	Doug Wright	Abbé de Coulmier	Lou Tryell	Florida Stage	Carbonell Award for Best Production of a Play
2000	Born Yesterday	Garson Kanin	Paul Verall	Robert Moss	Syracuse Stage	
2000	Uncle Vanya	Anton Chekhov	Astrov	Robert Rechnitz	Two River Theater	
2001	The Right Way to Sue	Ellen Melaver	Tom	Anne Kaufman	New Georges	
2001–2002	Copenhagen	Michael Frayn	Werner Heisenberg	Michael Blakemore	National Tour	
2003	Worm Day	Matthew Calhoun	Mick	Tom Herman	DR2 Theatre	
2004	Boy	Julia Jordan	Mick	Joe Calarco	Primary Stages	
2004	Melissa Arctic	Craig Wright	Paul	Aaron Posner	Folger Theatre	
2005	Julius Caesar	William Shakespeare	Octavius Caesar	Daniel J. Sullivan	Belasco Theatre	
2005	The Sketch Comedian	Elizabeth Meriwether	The Sketch Comedian	Alex Timbers	Drama League DirectorFest	
2005	The Ladies of the Corridor	Dorothy Parker	Paul	Dan Wackerman	Peccadillo Theatre Company	
2006	The Real Thing	Tom Stoppard	Henry	Robert Moss	Syracuse Stage	
2007	Some Men	Terrence McNally	Bernie	Trip Cullman	Second Stage Theatre	
2008	Finks	Joe Gilford	Bobby Gerard	Charlie Stratton	New York Stage and Film	
2008	The Fifth Column	Ernest Hemingway	Philip Rawlings	Jonathan Bank	Mint Theater Company	
2008	Happy Now?	Lucinda Coxon	Johnny	Liz Diamond	Yale Repertory Theatre	
2009	Jailbait	Deirdre O'Connor	Robert	Suzanne Agins	Cherry Lane Theatre	
2010	Happy Now?	Lucinda Coxon	Johnny	Liz Diamond	Primary Stages	Drama Desk Award nomination for Outstanding Play
2011	A Dram of Drummhicit	Arthur Kopit; Anton Dudley	Mackenzie Stewart	Christopher Ashley	La Jolla Playhouse	
2012	Blood and Gifts	J. T. Rogers	Jim Warnock	Lucie Tiberghien	La Jolla Playhouse	
2012	Radiance	Cusi Cram	Artie; Laurence	Suzanne Agins	LAByrinth Theater Company	
2013	The Call	Tanya Barfield	Peter	Leigh Silverman	Playwrights Horizons	
2014	The Wayside Motor Inn	A. R. Gurney	Andy	Lila Neugebauer	Signature Theatre Company	Drama Desk Award for Outstanding Ensemble; Drama Desk Award nomination for Outstanding Revival of a Play; Drama Desk Award nomination for Outstanding Director
2015	Of Good Stock	Melissa Ross	Fred	Lynne Meadow	Manhattan Theatre Club	
2018	Radio Island	Liza Birkenmeier	Sheriff & Oil Man	Jaki Bradley	New York Stage and Film	
2019	The 24 Hour Plays Broadway	Jesse Eisenberg	Clarence/Clearance	Carolyn Cantor	Laura Pels Theater	
2019	Long Lost	Donald Margulies	David	Daniel Sullivan	Manhattan Theatre Club	
