= Jonathan Cullen =

British actor

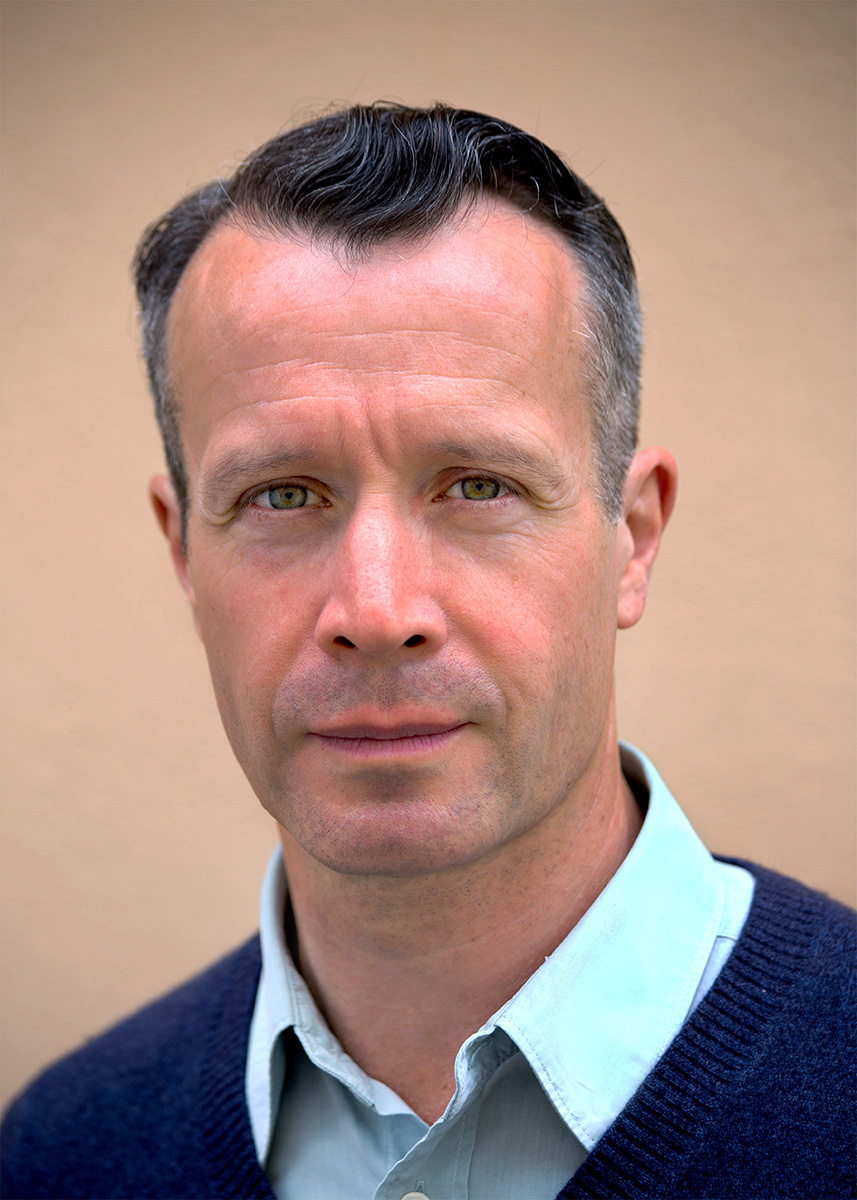
- Born: 1960 (age 65–66); Newcastle upon Tyne, Northumberland, England
- Education: Guildhall School of Music and Drama
- Occupation: Actor
- Years active: 1985–present
- Spouse(s): Cammie Toloui; Susannah Waters, divorced; 2 children

Jonathan Cullen (born 1960) is a British actor of stage, film and television.

== Personal life ==
Born in Newcastle upon Tyne, Northumberland, Cullen's father was Tony Cullen, a founding member of the Northern Sinfonia. He was educated at the Royal Grammar School, Newcastle, and went on to take a French and Philosophy degree at New College, Oxford.

== Career ==
After graduating at Oxford, he went on to train for a career in drama at Guildhall School of Music and Drama in London, leaving in May 1985 to appear at the West Yorkshire Playhouse, Leeds, making his professional debut. Alongside his acting career, Cullen has also worked as a director and as a teacher at Guildhall School of Music and Drama, the Royal Academy of Dramatic Art (RADA) in London, the American Conservatory Theater School (San Francisco) and the British American Drama Academy (London).

=== Theatre ===
Cullen recently appeared in The Mentor at the Vaudeville Theatre, London. Other work in theatre includes: Market Boy, Albert Speer, Ghetto, Fuenteovejuna, Bartholomew Fair and The Strangeness of Others at the National Theatre, London; Tis Pity She's a Whore and A Woman Killed with Kindness for the RSC; Nightsongs, Under the Blue Sky, Our Late Night, Rafts and Dreams, Talking to Terrorists, and Gibraltar Strait/Falkland Sound at the Royal Court, London; Our Country's Good for Out of Joint at the Young Vic, London; Grace Note at the Old Vic, London; Chatsky at the Almeida Theatre, London; Dr Faustus at Greenwich Theatre, London; Morning and Evening at Hampstead Theatre, London; The Master and Margarita, Nathan the Wise and The Seagull at the Chichester Festival Theatre; Goodbye Gilbert Harding at the Theatre Royal, Plymouth and on tour; The Merchant of Venice at the Crucible Theatre, Sheffield; Venice Preserv'd at the Royal Exchange; Vieux Carré at Nottingham Playhouse; Desire Under the Elms for Shared Experience; Equus, Feelgood and The Clandestine Marriage in the West End. He has recently appeared in Happy Now?, a new play by Lucinda Coxon, and in Love the Sinner at the National Theatre (London).

=== Television ===
His TV credits include: Outnumbered, Ghostboat, Midsomer Murders and Dalziel and Pascoe.

=== Film ===
His film appearances include: Poppy Shakespeare, Fred Claus, Finding Neverland and Velvet Goldmine.
