= Happy Now? (play) =

Play by Lucinda Coxon

- Written by: Lucinda Coxon
- Characters: Michael; Kitty; Johnny; Miles; Bea; Carl; June
- Original language: English
- Setting: The city

Premiere
- Date premiered: 24 January 2008
- Place premiered: National Theatre, London
- Official website

Happy Now? is a British play by Lucinda Coxon, first staged at the National Theatre, London in 2008.

== Plot ==
After a conversation with Michael, a middle aged businessman, at a conference hotel, Kitty begins to wonder what life is really all about as she desperately tries to balance family life with personal freedom and fidelity with a trying job in marketing for a cancer charity. Meanwhile, at home, Johnny (her husband) makes out she's got it easy compared to his hectic schedule as a newly trained teacher – a job he ironically took on to lead a more laid-back lifestyle. Kitty's parents are drifting further and further apart as her mother, June, tries to keep Kitty on her side of the feud. Miles and Bea – Kitty and Johnny's friends – are also struggling to hold it together as Miles is slowly becoming more and more gripped by alcoholism whilst Carl, another friend, seems to have the ideal lifestyle with his new lifeguard boyfriend Antonio.

== Original production ==
The original production was staged at the Cottesloe Theatre, National Theatre, London on 24 January 2008 and played until 10 May 2008. The production was directed by Thea Sharrock and featured the following cast:

- Michael – Stanley Townsend
- Kitty – Olivia Williams
- Johnny – Jonathan Cullen
- Miles – Dominic Rowan
- Bea – Emily Joyce
- Carl – Stuart McQuarrie
- June – Anne Reid

The technical crew were as follows:

- Production manager – Igor
- Designer – Jonathan Fensom
- Lighting designer – Oliver Fenwick
- Sound designer – Paul Arditti
- Fight director – Terry King
- Company voice work – Kate Godfrey
- Assistant director – Laura Farnworth
- Stage manager – Fiona Bardsley
- Deputy stage manager – Valerie Fox
- Assistant stage manager – Sophie Milne
- Costume supervisor – Jane Gooday
- Prop supervisor – Kirsten Shiell
- Assistant to the lighting designer – Paul Knott
- Assistant production manager – Simon Khamara
- Design associate – Ben Austin
- Video images – Gemma Carrington
- Production photographer – Stephen Cummiskey

== Subsequent productions ==
Yale Repertory Theater

- 25 October – 25 November 2008
- Directed by Liz Diamond

Cast:

- Michael – David Andrew Macdonald
- Kitty – Mary Bacon
- Johnny – Kelly AuCoin
- Miles – Quentin Mare
- Bea – Katharine Powell
- Carl – Brian Keane
- June – Joan MacIntosh

Creative team:

- Scenic designer – Sarah Pearline
- Lighting designer – Matt Frey
- Sound designer – David Budries
- Costume designer – Heidi Hanson
- Fight director – David DeBesse
- Vocal and dialect coach – Pamela Prather
- Stage manager – Amanda Spooner
- Casting – Tara Rubin Casting
- Production dramaturg – Sarah Bishop-Stone
- Assistant director – Christopher Mirto

Primary Stages Theater

- 26 January – 6 March 2010
- Directed by Liz Diamond

Cast:

- Michael – C. J. Wilson
- Kitty – Mary Bacon
- Johnny – Kelly AuCoin
- Miles – Quentin Mare
- Bea – Kate Arrington
- Carl – Brian Keane
- June – Joan MacIntosh

Creative team:

- Scenic designer – Narelle Sissons
- Lighting designer – Matt Frey
- Sound designer – David Budries
- Costume designer – Jennifer Moeller
- Fight director – David DeBesse
- Props master – Faye Armon
- Projection designer – Jeff Sugg
- Associate projection designer – Daniel Brodie
- Vocal and dialect coach – Pamela Prather
- Stage manager – Matthew Melchiorre
- Assistant stage manager – Amanda Spooner
- Casting – Stephanie Klapper Casting

== Reception ==
Happy Now? won the Writer's Guild Best New Play Award and the Susan Smith Blackburn Special Commendation Award. In New York, it was nominated for the Drama Desk Award for Outstanding Play.

The play was very well-received, with The Independent, Whatsonstage.com awarding it four stars and the Daily Telegraph calling it "a richly rewarding gem... the best new play to have arrived on a British stage for at least a year'.

The New York premiere saw the play hailed as a "tart, entertaining and ultimately haunting comedy".
