= The Good House (film) =

- Theatrical release poster
- Directed by: Maya Forbes; Wally Wolodarsky
- Screenplay by: Thomas Bezucha; Maya Forbes; Wally Wolodarsky
- Based on: The Good House by Ann Leary
- Produced by: Jane Rosenthal; Berry Welsh; Aaron Ryder
- Starring: Sigourney Weaver; Kevin Kline; Morena Baccarin; Rob Delaney
- Cinematography: Andrei Bowden Schwartz
- Edited by: Catherine Haight
- Music by: Theodore Shapiro
- Production companies: DreamWorks Pictures; Participant; Reliance Entertainment; FilmNation Entertainment; Faliro House
- Distributed by: Lionsgate; Roadside Attractions
- Release dates: September 15, 2021 (TIFF); September 30, 2022 (United States)
- Running time: 114 minutes
- Country: United States
- Language: English
- Box office: $2.3 million

The Good House is a 2021 American drama film starring Sigourney Weaver and Kevin Kline. Long time Massachusetts realtor Hildy Good's life starts to fall apart a few years after her husband comes out, divorcing her. An alcoholic in denial, she reconnects with her high school sweetheart Frank and eventually faces her addiction after a scare. The film is based on Ann Leary's 2013 novel The Good House, and it is directed by Maya Forbes and Wally Wolodarsky, who wrote the screenplay with Thomas Bezucha.

It is the last DreamWorks Pictures film to be produced by Participant, since Participant terminated its equity stake in Amblin Partners, ending its relationship with the company on November 30, 2020, and also ceased operations due to the 2023 Hollywood labor disputes on April 16, 2024.

== Plot ==
Hildy Good, once the most prosperous realtor in Wendover, has fallen on hard times following her divorce and her family's insistence she go to rehab for alcoholism. Her former assistant, Wendy, also stole her clients while she was in rehab, adding to her problems. Hildy attempts to aid a local family with an autistic child sell their home, so they can move and enroll him in a special school by getting her former boyfriend, Frank, to renovate their home. She renews her relationship with Frank, but the home sale falls through, and she finds out her former clients yet again are stolen by Wendy.

Hildy befriends a woman, Rebecca, who she sold a house to her and her husband and is then drawn into her life. She discovers Rebecca and the local psychiatrist, Peter, are having an affair, but she promises she will not reveal their secret. Hildy continues to drink in solitude instead of in the open, justifying her drinking by saying she just needs to take the edge off and that she does not "need" to drink.

Peter approaches Hildy about selling his home, but says it is not set in stone and not to speak of it. She assumes this means he will be asking his wife for a divorce. Hildy decides not to drink anymore after one night when she is cornered in the cellar and drinks two bottles of wine.

Hildy avoids alcohol for quite a while, and then finds out that Peter is selling his home and using Wendy as a realtor instead of her. She confronts him and says he will destroy her career if he gives this sale to Wendy, so she threatens him with the information she has about him and Rebecca.

Hildy is able to sell the house of her friends after all when a couple from New York suddenly purchases it sight unseen. She then uses that sale to snag the large estate the Santorelli brothers built in Wendover. Hildy celebrates with the Santorelli brothers in a bar, taking her first sip of alcohol in a while, and then cannot stop. She drives drunk to Frank's house, telling him they need to celebrate, and Frank takes her keys and offers to drive her home. She gets angry and refuses, saying she would rather walk.

The next day, Hildy is awakened by Frank, and he shows her the car in her driveway with a damaged front end. She had walked back to his house after getting the spare key and driven back home. Jake, the autistic son of her friends is missing, and they fear the worst.

Frank hides Hildy's car, then leaves to help with the search. Hildy then goes to the kitchen to take a drink when Peter walks in dripping wet. They have a conversation where he says the missing boy is fine, but she needs to get herself under control. Suddenly, he disappears and Hildy hears her oldest daughter in the house, so they go to help with the search. The police find a body in the water, but it ends up being Peter, meaning Hildy had hallucinated her talk with him, and she collapses, begging for help.

Jake is found safe by Rebecca while horseback riding (and unaware of Jake being missing or Peter being dead) and is led home. Frank shows Hildy his boat, having found it in a salvage yard after his Army stint. She willingly goes into rehab this time and accepts that she does have a drinking problem, and the movie closes with her and Frank sailing on the boat he made for her when they were young.

== Cast ==
- Sigourney Weaver as Hildy Good
  - Isabelle Trudel as young Hildy
- Kevin Kline as Frank Getchell
- Morena Baccarin as Rebecca McAllister
- Rob Delaney as Peter Newbold
- Beverly D'Angelo as Mamie Lang
- David Rasche as Scott Good
- Rebecca Henderson as Tess Good
- Molly Brown as Emily Good
- Kelly AuCoin as Brian McAllister
- Kathryn Erbe as Wendy Heatherton
- Paul Guilfoyle as Henry Barlow

== Production ==
It was announced on September 23, 2019, that filming had begun in Canada on the project. Maya Forbes and Wally Wolodarsky were directing the film in addition to writing the screenplay, and Sigourney Weaver and Kevin Kline cast to star. Morena Baccarin, Rob Delaney, Beverly D'Angelo, David Rasche, and Rebecca Henderson were added to the cast the next month. On November 5, 2019, Kelly AuCoin and Kathryn Erbe joined the cast of the film.

== Release ==
The film had its world premiere at the 2021 Toronto International Film Festival on September 15, 2021. Originally, Universal Pictures was set to distribute in the United States and some other international territories, but the film's U.S. rights were later said to be on sale. On June 13, 2022, days before the film's premiere at the Tribeca Film Festival on June 18, Lionsgate and Roadside Attractions acquired North American rights to the film. Following the film's premiere at Tribeca, it was released on September 30 the same year.

The film was released for VOD on October 18, 2022, followed by a Blu-ray and DVD release on November 22, 2022.

== Reception ==
On the review aggregator website Rotten Tomatoes, The Good House holds an approval rating of 73% based on 78 reviews with an average of 6.1/10. The website's critics consensus reads: "The Good House creaks in spots, but with Kevin Kline and Sigourney Weaver providing load-bearing performances, it's far from a fixer-upper." On Metacritic, which uses a weighted average, the film has a score of 62 out 100 based on 16 reviews, indicating "generally positive reviews".
