= Anne Dean Turk Performing Arts Center =

Art museum in Kilgore, United States

Anne Dean Turk Fine Arts Center
- Established: 1966 (Van Cliburn Auditorium built)
- Location: 1200 S Henderson Blvd, Kilgore, Texas, U.S.
- Coordinates: 32°22′40.78″N 94°52′9.29″W
- Type: Art museum, Performing arts center
- Owner: Kilgore College
- Website: www.texasshakespeare.com

The Anne Dean Turk Performing Arts Center also called the Anne Dean Turk Fine Arts Center is a performing arts venue and art museum located on the campus of Kilgore College in Kilgore, Texas. The center houses the Anne Dean Turk Art Gallery and the Van Cliburn Auditorium, and serves as the home for the college's visual and performing arts departments. It is also the primary venue for the professional Texas Shakespeare Festival.

== History ==
The facility's primary performance space, the Van Cliburn Auditorium, was constructed in 1966. The building was originally known as the Applied Arts Building.

On December 9, 1989, the building was renamed in honor of Anne Dean Turk, a distinguished faculty member who taught piano, music theory, and piano ensemble at Kilgore College from 1946 until her retirement in 1982. Turk was an alumna of The University of Texas at Austin, the Juilliard School, and Columbia University. During her tenure at Kilgore College, she founded a Piano Concerto Program that provided students the rare opportunity to perform with a professional orchestra, a unique feature for a two-year college. In 1981, the Minnie Stevens Piper Foundation named her a "Piper Professor" in recognition of her outstanding teaching.

The center's auditorium is named for the world-renowned concert pianist Van Cliburn. While Cliburn was not an alumnus, Kilgore College has honored his legacy through the naming of the venue and by offering music scholarships in his name. In 2013, following the deaths of both Turk and Cliburn, the Kilgore College Piano Division hosted a memorial concert in their honor at the auditorium.

== Facilities ==
=== Anne Dean Turk Art Gallery ===
The Anne Dean Turk Art Gallery is the center's exhibition space. Its mission is to provide a dynamic venue for emerging and established artists and to foster cultural dialogue within the campus and the wider East Texas community. The gallery hosts a diverse series of exhibitions throughout the year, including shows featuring Kilgore College faculty and guest artists. For example, in 2019, the gallery hosted "Local Color," an exhibition of landscape paintings by Peter Andrew, a professor from nearby Stephen F. Austin State University. Admission to the gallery is free to the public.

=== Van Cliburn Auditorium ===
The Van Cliburn Auditorium is an intimate, 220-seat indoor theatre. It features a flexible proscenium stage measuring approximately 30 by 30 feet, an orchestra pit, and a fly loft with 26 line sets. The facility is equipped with a walkable lighting balcony and underwent an upgrade to its dimmer rack and control board in 2010.

The auditorium is the primary performance space for the Kilgore College Theatre Department and serves as the home of the Texas Shakespeare Festival. It also hosts concerts by the college's musical ensembles, including the KC Connection choir and the Wind Symphony.

== Academic Programs ==
The Anne Dean Turk Fine Arts Center is the academic home for the Kilgore College Visual Arts department. The department offers Associate of Arts degrees in Fine Arts and Advertising & Graphic Design Technology, designed for students planning to transfer to a four-year university or enter professional practice.

== Resident Companies ==
=== Texas Shakespeare Festival ===
The center is the home of the Texas Shakespeare Festival, the only professional theatre company in East Texas. The festival was founded by Raymond Caldwell, the founder of Kilgore College's Fine Arts Department. Each summer, the professional repertory company brings actors, designers, and technicians from across the United States to produce a season of plays, which includes Shakespearean works, a non-Shakespearean classic, a musical, and a children's show. For its 40th season in 2025, productions included Macbeth, Twelfth Night, Steel Magnolias, and the musical Kiss Me, Kate. The season also featured Daisy Bradford 3, an original play about the East Texas oil discovery that was commissioned for the festival's inaugural season in 1986. All mainstage performances are held in the Van Cliburn Auditorium.

== See also ==
- Tourist attractions in the United States
- Van Cliburn
