= A House Divided (Person of Interest) =

- Person of Interest episode
- Episode no.: Season 3 Episode 22
- Directed by: Chris Fisher
- Written by: Amanda Segel
- Cinematography by: Manuel Billeter
- Editing by: Ryan Malanaphy
- Production code: 2J7622
- Original air date: May 6, 2014
- Running time: 44 minutes

Guest appearances
- Leslie Odom Jr. as Peter Collier; John Doman as Senator Ross Garrison; Joseph Mazzello as Daniel Casey; Michael Esper as Jason Greenfield; John Nolan as John Greer; Boris McGiver as Hersh; Joseph Melendez as Manuel Rivera; Kelly AuCoin as Langdon; Marc Damon Johnson as Jesse Brandt; Camryn Manheim as Control

Episode chronology
← Previous "Beta"	Next → "Deus Ex Machina"

"A House Divided" is the 22nd episode of the third season of the American television drama series Person of Interest. It is the 67th overall episode of the series and is written by co-executive producer Amanda Segel and directed by co-executive producer Chris Fisher. It aired on CBS in the United States and on CTV in Canada on May 6, 2014.

The series revolves around a computer program for the federal government known as "The Machine" that is capable of collating all sources of information to predict terrorist acts and to identify people planning them. A team, consisting of John Reese, Harold Finch and Sameen Shaw follow "irrelevant" crimes: lesser level of priority for the government. In the episode, the team must find Finch while at the same time protecting five numbers vital to Samaritan's development. Flashbacks explore Collier's life before the events of the series. Despite being credited, Kevin Chapman does not appear.

According to Nielsen Media Research, the episode was seen by an estimated 10.50 million household viewers and gained a 1.7/5 ratings share among adults aged 18–49. The episode received very positive reviews, with critics praising the flashbacks and character development, although the pace of the episode received criticism.

== Plot ==
=== Flashbacks ===
In 2010, Peter Brandt (Leslie Odom Jr.) is dining with his brother Jesse (Marc Damon Johnson) when the police arrives to arrest Jesse for unknown motives. Jesse entrusts Peter to take care of his son. Peter confronts Assistant United States Attorney Langdon (Kelly AuCoin) about the arrest and Langdon states that Jesse was associated with a terrorist organization, which Peter refuses to believe. A few months later, Jesse commits suicide in prison. Peter receives a visit from a man whom Jesse met at Alcoholics Anonymous as a sponsor. He gives him a chip, telling him that it's thanks to his brother that he is alive. All the events cause Peter to question the government, especially blaming them for Jesse's death. He later receives a text from an unknown person who claims to know what happened to Jesse.

=== Present day ===
Reese (Jim Caviezel) and Shaw (Sarah Shahi) are pursuing Decima agents but all the agents commit suicide, partly for their insurance policy for their families. Root (Amy Acker) reveals she has been working with Daniel Casey (Joseph Mazzello) and Jason Greenfield (Michael Esper) on finding more information on the Samaritan servers. Throughout the episode, Finch (Michael Emerson) and Greer (John Nolan) talk about their respective opinions on Samaritan and the Machine.

Greer later meets with Senator Garrison (John Doman) to discuss Samaritan and Greer refuses to sell Samaritan. The team has followed the Machine to the Carlton Hotel where they receive 5 numbers. One of the numbers belongs to Control (Camryn Manheim). Shaw infiltrates the hotel and finds that Garrison is also at the hotel and is their second number. Control and Garrison meet with Presidential assistant Manuel Rivera (Joseph Melendez) and General Kyle Holcombe and convince them to participate in the program. The team finds that Rivera and Holcombe are two of their numbers and set to find the fifth number.

Root and Reese intercept a Vigilance agent who carries a USB flash drive that contains a computer worm. Shaw enters the room where Control, Rivera and Holcombe are staying to help them. However, the city suffers a major blackout propelled by Vigilance. Vigilance hitmen, including Collier, infiltrate the hotel and kill Holcombe. Shaw and Reese fight against Vigilance and Hersh (Boris McGiver), who was sent to save Control. However, Root reconnects with the Machine and discovers that the fifth number belongs to Greer as Finch is in danger.

Root takes Casey and Greenfield out of the city and gives them fake IDs to flee. It's revealed that the work on the servers allowed her to find Samaritan's location. Reese and Shaw use Hersh to find Decima's location but Vigilance arrives first. By the time Reese, Shaw and Hersh arrive to the building, they find it empty except for a TV. It turns on to reveal Collier and Vigilance holding a trial while showing Rivera, Control, Garrison, Greer and Finch as their kidnapped detainees.

== Reception ==
=== Viewers ===
In its original American broadcast, "A House Divided" was seen by an estimated 10.50 million household viewers and gained a 1.7/5 ratings share among adults aged 18–49, according to Nielsen Media Research. This means that 1.7 percent of all households with televisions watched the episode, while 5 percent of all households watching television at that time watched it. This was a 8% decrease in viewership from the previous episode, which was watched by 11.31 million viewers with a 1.9/6 in the 18-49 demographics. With these ratings, Person of Interest was the third most watched show on CBS for the night, behind NCIS: Los Angeles and NCIS, second on its timeslot and sixth for the night in the 18-49 demographics, behind Agents of S.H.I.E.L.D., Chicago Fire, NCIS: Los Angeles, NCIS, and The Voice.

With Live +7 DVR factored in, the episode was watched by 14.48 million viewers with a 2.7 in the 18-49 demographics.

=== Critical reviews ===
"A House Divided" received very positive reviews from critics. Matt Fowler of IGN gave the episode a "great" 8.8 out of 10 rating and wrote in his verdict, "'A House Divided' actually felt a bit dizzying at times. That is until Vigilance took the reins. Then this installment really came together in ways that I really enjoyed. Plus, it's hard to think of a scenario where the show could actually have Samaritan be activated on a large scale for real. It just seems like there'd be no way back from that. So it might have to just exist only as this big doomsday threat. And that being the case, the show would then have to figure out a completely different way to end the season. And I loved the direction this episode took and how Collier came back around as a vital character."

Phil Dyess-Nugent of The A.V. Club gave the episode an "A−" grade and wrote, "Having gone that extra mile in establishing Greer as this season's man you love to hate, Person of Interest flips the script, so that the real threat to Finch's life is shown to be the terrorist group Vigilance and its leader, Peter Collier."

Sean McKenna of TV Fanatic gave the episode a 4.5 star rating out of 5 and wrote "There's so many possibilities that the anticipation for next week has me formulating various scenarios how it could all go down. But if anything, we all know that with Person of Interest, it's going to go out with a solidly, well-crafted bang of story, action and character."
