= Allegiance (Person of Interest) =

- Person of Interest episode
- Episode no.: Season 3 Episode 18
- Directed by: Jeffrey Hunt
- Written by: Tony Camerino
- Cinematography by: Manuel Billeter
- Editing by: Scott Powell
- Production code: 2J7618
- Original air date: March 25, 2014
- Running time: 44 minutes

Guest appearances
- Nazneen Contractor as Maria Martinez; Haaz Sleiman as Omar Risha; John Nolan as John Greer; Michel Gill as Rene Lapointe; Casey Biggs as Ken Davis; William Abadie as Christos Sevon

Episode chronology
← Previous "/"	Next → "Most Likely To..."

"Allegiance" is the 18th episode of the third season of the American television drama series Person of Interest. It is the 63rd overall episode of the series and is written by Tony Camerino and directed by Jeffrey Hunt. It aired on CBS in the United States and on CTV in Canada on March 25, 2014.

The series revolves around a computer program for the federal government known as "The Machine" that is capable of collating all sources of information to predict terrorist acts and to identify people planning them. A team, consisting of John Reese, Harold Finch and Sameen Shaw follow "irrelevant" crimes: lesser level of priority for the government. In the episode, the team follows a woman who is trying to help a friend in clearing his name from a terrorist incident. Meanwhile, Root tries to get close to Greer and discover more about Samaritan.

According to Nielsen Media Research, the episode was seen by an estimated 12.23 million household viewers and gained a 2.0/6 ratings share among adults aged 18–49. The episode received positive reviews, although critics were underwhelmed with the case, others highlighted its connection to the overarching arc, particularly on the final scene.

== Plot ==
The team receives the number of Maria Martinez (Nazneen Contractor), an engineer working for the international energy company HydralCorp. Meanwhile, Root (Amy Acker) starts following John Greer (John Nolan) but Greer is extremely careful of his moves and manages to avoid her.

Reese (Jim Caviezel) and Shaw (Sarah Shahi) watch as Maria meets with a man, whose brother Omar Risha (Haaz Sleiman) has been arrested for terrorism, and gives her a package. Later, Shaw and Fusco (Kevin Chapman) see Maria put a GPS tracker on a limo belonging to French United Nations diplomat Rene Lapointe (Michel Gill). Maria follows Lapointe to a restaurant with the package, which consists of evidence of Omar's innocence but is brushed off and gets no evidence to support their theory. However, Maria meets Greek diplomat Christos Sevon (William Abadie), who gives her his card.

Reese and Finch (Michael Emerson) talk with Lapointe to get more information into Omar's arrest. After saving Maria from hitmen, the team takes her to the Library where she explains that Omar worked with her on Iraq as a translator to transport generators when terrorists ambushed them but Omar saved her life. The generators went missing and Omar learned about their disappearance, being targeted for it. Finch visits Omar in jail and learns that the generators were shipped elsewhere and that HydralCorp's corrupt CEO Ken Davis (Casey Biggs) is responsible. Davis wants Omar deported back to Iraq, where he will be killed.

Maria and Shaw discover that Davis has created a false report of Omar's terrorist accusations, and that Lapointe has the papers approving Omar's asylum in the US in his office. Maria infiltrates his office with the help of Sevon but when Lapointe arrives, Sevon kills him and prepares to kill Maria when Reese and Fusco arrive to overcome him. Sevon is arrested and Omar is granted asylum in the country. In the final scene, Root takes Bear with her to follow Greer and finds him meeting with Davis in Central Park. Davis had the generators delivered to Greer but as he leaves, Greer has his men kill him. She later follows him to a train station with the help of Bear and Greer talks to her, admiring her skills and offers her a position at Decima. She refuses and Decima hitmen hold her at gunpoint but Greer allows her to go.

== Reception ==
=== Viewers ===
In its original American broadcast, "Allegiance" was seen by an estimated 12.23 million household viewers and gained a 2.0/6 ratings share among adults aged 18–49, according to Nielsen Media Research. This means that 2.0 percent of all households with televisions watched the episode, while 6 percent of all households watching television at that time watched it. This was a 11% increase in viewership from the previous episode, which was watched by 10.94 million viewers with a 1.7/5 in the 18-49 demographics. With these ratings, Person of Interest was the third most watched show on CBS for the night, behind NCIS: Los Angeles and NCIS, first on its timeslot and fourth for the night in the 18-49 demographics, behind NCIS: Los Angeles, NCIS, and The Voice.

With Live +7 DVR factored in, the episode was watched by 16.64 million viewers with a 3.2 in the 18-49 demographics.

=== Critical reviews ===
"Allegiance" received positive reviews from critics. Matt Fowler of IGN gave the episode a "great" 8 out of 10 rating and wrote in his verdict, "This week's POI case had the good fortune of being somewhat connected to the larger story, making it so that Root's side mission converged with the rest of the team's actions. Not directly of course, but discovering that Greer was basically behind everything we'd been watching retroactively put a new spin on all of it. And Root's scenes kicked ass. As they should. I could watch Root all the time, though I understand the decision to perhaps use her sparingly simply because she's so powerful now."

Phil Dyess-Nugent of The A.V. Club gave the episode a "B" grade and wrote, "There's no real surprise, and certainly no shame, in the fact that after last week's lollapalooza of an episode, Person of Interest spends most of this week reverting to formula."
