= Death Benefit =

- Person of Interest episode
- Episode no.: Season 3 Episode 20
- Directed by: Richard J. Lewis
- Written by: Erik Mountain & Lucas O'Connor
- Cinematography by: Manuel Billeter
- Editing by: Mark Conte
- Production code: 2J7620
- Original air date: April 15, 2014
- Running time: 44 minutes

Guest appearances
- John Heard as Roger McCourt; John Doman as Senator Ross Garrison; John Nolan as John Greer; Morocco Omari as Carlson; Murphy Guyer as Bruce Dunphy; Tracy Howe as Duran

Episode chronology
← Previous "Most Likely To..."	Next → "Beta"

"Death Benefit" is the 20th episode of the third season of the American television drama series Person of Interest. It is the 65th overall episode of the series and is written by co-producer Erik Mountain and Lucas O'Connor and directed by Richard J. Lewis. It aired on CBS in the United States and on CTV in Canada on April 15, 2014.

The series revolves around a computer program for the federal government known as "The Machine" that is capable of collating all sources of information to predict terrorist acts and to identify people planning them. A team, consisting of John Reese, Harold Finch and Sameen Shaw follow "irrelevant" crimes: lesser level of priority for the government. In the episode, the team continues working with the Machine despite the leak to the media. They must protect a Congressman but their own actions become the problem when they discover the reason behind their assignment. The title refers to "Death benefit", a payment given to anyone with a life insurance policy when the insured person dies. Despite being credited, Kevin Chapman does not appear.

According to Nielsen Media Research, the episode was seen by an estimated 10.74 million household viewers and gained a 1.8/5 ratings share among adults aged 18–49. The episode received near critical acclaim, with major highlights including Michael Emerson's performance, writing, moral dilemma and ending.

== Plot ==
The Machine's existence has been leaked to the media but the team is still able to use it. Root (Amy Acker) now receives the relevant numbers and takes Shaw (Sarah Shahi) with her for a mission in Alaska. Reese (Jim Caviezel) then goes to Washington, D.C. after Finch (Michael Emerson) calls him.

Finch says that their new number is Congressman Roger McCourt (John Heard), who opposes the mass surveillance. Reese infiltrates McCourt's Secret Service detail and struggles to identify a threat as McCourt appears to have no enemies. They discover that Decima is interested in following McCourt and Decima exposes Reese's real identity, forcing him to subdue the Secret Service guards and take McCourt with him. In an art museum, Senator Garrison (John Doman) meets with Greer (John Nolan), who gives him knowledge about Vigilance and Collier. He also proposes giving Samaritan to the government although Garrison hesitates on it.

Reese and Finch take McCourt to a safe house when Decima hitmen arrive thanks to a GPS tracker on McCourt. They escape and are saved by Shaw, who just returned from her trip with Root. Due to a blockade, they are forced to hide in a suburban home while keeping a hitman, Carlson (Morocco Omari), hostage. They interrogate Carlson but find that, contrary to their idea, Decima wants to protect McCourt. McCourt admits to agreeing to help Decima with favorable legislation (granting Decima access to government surveillance feeds), in exchange for insider stock-trading tips. He also agreed to help run the system, rather than let the government do it. The team eventually deduces that due to his danger to let Samaritan take over, the Machine wants them to kill McCourt.

Finch is conflicted, as the Machine would only order a death when a great amount of people's lives are endangered. Finch fails to convince McCourt to change his plans and despite Reese and Shaw willing to kill him, they are forced to flee when the authorities arrive and leave McCourt alive. During their escape, Shaw is shot in the leg. They manage to make it to New York but Finch leaves Reese and Shaw with his faith on the Machine lost. After a talk with McCourt, Garrison agrees to let Decima make a 24-hour Beta test with Samaritan. The episode ends as Greer activates Samaritan and gives it his first order: track down Harold Finch.

== Reception ==
=== Viewers ===
In its original American broadcast, "Death Benefit" was seen by an estimated 10.74 million household viewers and gained a 1.8/5 ratings share among adults aged 18–49, according to Nielsen Media Research. This means that 1.8 percent of all households with televisions watched the episode, while 5 percent of all households watching television at that time watched it. This was a 7% decrease in viewership from the previous episode, which was watched by 11.45 million viewers with a 1.9/6 in the 18-49 demographics. With these ratings, Person of Interest was the third most watched show on CBS for the night, behind NCIS: Los Angeles and NCIS, first on its timeslot and fifth for the night in the 18-49 demographics, behind Agents of S.H.I.E.L.D., NCIS: Los Angeles, NCIS, and The Voice.

With Live +7 DVR factored in, the episode was watched by 15.12 million viewers with a 2.8 in the 18-49 demographics.

=== Critical reviews ===
"Death Benefit" received near critical acclaim from critics. Matt Fowler of IGN gave the episode an "amazing" 9 out of 10 rating and wrote in his verdict, "'Death Benefit' was exciting, wrenching, and even a little frightening. The fact that Finch couldn't outright dismiss the possibility that The Machine might order them to kill for the good of the world was scary - but not as scary as Finch basically never thinking something out there would ever be so bad that The Machine would have to do that. Which automatically turns Samaritan into a possible agent of the End Times. Something so dangerous that he never even considered that it could exist. And he built The Machine! Basically Finch went from 'These are strange times' to 'I never dreamt it could come to this.' All in all, a great episode with a thunderous twist that really worked to elevate the Season 3 endgame."

Phil Dyess-Nugent of The A.V. Club gave the episode an "A−" grade and wrote, "No doubt when the smoke of whatever is coming has cleared, someone will still be alive and in shape to carry the show into its fourth season. But just in case, it's getting to the point where it would be reassuring to know that Finch has a contingency plan to make sure that someone will go to the library when he's gone and feed the dog."

Sean McKenna of TV Fanatic gave the episode a 4.6 star rating out of 5 and wrote "Person of Interest Season 3 may have taken some time to build up steam but it hasn't let up. The staple badass moments are there, the humor, action and characters are there. And a story that keeps a compelling pace full of tension as we draw closer to the finale continues to prove why this is one of the best shows on television."
