= / (Person of Interest) =

- Person of Interest episode
- Episode no.: Season 3 Episode 17
- Directed by: Jeffrey Lee Gibson
- Written by: David Slack
- Cinematography by: David Insley
- Editing by: Mark Conte
- Production code: 2J7617
- Original air date: March 18, 2014
- Running time: 44 minutes

Guest appearances
- Yul Vazquez as Cyrus Wells; Leslie Odom Jr. as Peter Collier; Colin Donnell as Billy Parsons; John Nolan as John Greer

Episode chronology
← Previous "RAM"	Next → "Allegiance"

"/" (also known as "Root Path") is the 17th episode of the third season of the American television drama series Person of Interest. It is the 62nd overall episode of the series and is written by co-executive producer David Slack and directed by Jeffrey Lee Gibson. It aired on CBS in the United States and on CTV in Canada on March 18, 2014.

The series revolves around a computer program for the federal government known as "The Machine" that is capable of collating all sources of information to predict terrorist acts and to identify people planning them. A team, consisting of John Reese, Harold Finch and Sameen Shaw follow "irrelevant" crimes: lesser level of priority for the government. In the episode, Root is completing tasks for the Machine in order to help a janitor. Coincidentally, Finch has also been notified that the janitor is their new number. The role of the janitor further expands the development of "Samaritan".

According to Nielsen Media Research, the episode was seen by an estimated 10.64 million household viewers and gained a 1.7/5 ratings share among adults aged 18–49. The episode received critical acclaim, with critics praising the writing, action scenes and Amy Acker's performance.

== Plot ==
In Champaign, Illinois, Root (Amy Acker) hijacks a prison bus and releases an inmate, Billy Parsons (Colin Donnell), per instruction from the Machine. She then gives him a fake ID so he infiltrates a government building posing as a United States Department of Defense and receives a note with an address. She then leaves Billy to be arrested by the police.

The Machine instructs Root to go to New York and locate a janitor at a bank, Cyrus Wells (Yul Vazquez). Surprisingly, Cyrus is willing to cooperate with her despite not knowing all the details. Root then finds Finch (Michael Emerson) on a park bench; he tells her Cyrus is their new number. Finch tells Root to step aside as she will put Cyrus on danger but Root refuses and warns Finch to focus on Samaritan as it will pose a threat to the Machine.

Root and Cyrus go to his apartment to pack his things when Vigilance hitmen, led by Collier (Leslie Odom Jr.), arrive. Reese (Jim Caviezel) and Shaw (Sarah Shahi) hold off Vigilance but also discover that John Greer (John Nolan) and Decima Technologies also want Cyrus. Root and Cyrus escapes and Root has Cyrus arrested so he can be on a safe protection. She later uses a fake federal warrant to release him from Fusco (Kevin Chapman), who is forced to proceed with the release. Cyrus confesses to Root that he and his college friends founded a firm but a shooter killed his friends and he eventually became a janitor.

Greer locates Cyrus and Root in a park and interferes with signals so Root has no access to the Machine. Greer's men capture Cyrus while Reese unsuccessfully tries to stop them. Root then meets with Finch to show him the note she retrieved in Illinois; they deduce that Cyrus has access to a company named Maxwell Limited, which is controlled by the NSA and houses an advanced supercomputing chip that could activate Samaritan. Finch questions the relevancy of Cyrus compared to the chip and Root confesses that she is responsible for his college friends' deaths. She excuses her actions by stating that if Samaritan is activated, the whole team (including herself) will die.

Greer's men take Cyrus to Maxwell Limited where they gain access through Cyrus's Retinal scan. Greer then orders his men to kill Cyrus but Reese and Fusco shortly arrive to save him. After forcing a doctor to fix her right ear with a device, Root also arrives at Maxwell Limited. They save Cyrus but Decima fled with the chip. Cyrus thanks Root and leaves, although Root does not mention her involvement in his friends' deaths. Finch offers Root to work together in order to stop Samaritan but Root declines, leaving for Paraguay. The episode ends as the Machine keeps track of Samaritan's development and starts analyzing threats to the team.

== Reception ==
=== Viewers ===
In its original American broadcast, "/" was seen by an estimated 10.94 million household viewers and gained a 1.7/5 ratings share among adults aged 18–49, according to Nielsen Media Research. This means that 1.7 percent of all households with televisions watched the episode, while 5 percent of all households watching television at that time watched it. This was a 3% increase in viewership from the previous episode, which was watched by 10.64 million viewers with a 1.7/5 in the 18-49 demographics. With these ratings, Person of Interest was the third most watched show on CBS for the night, behind NCIS: Los Angeles and NCIS, second on its timeslot and seventh for the night in the 18-49 demographics, behind Growing Up Fisher, Chicago Fire, About a Boy, NCIS: Los Angeles, NCIS, and The Voice.

With Live +7 DVR factored in, the episode was watched by 15.30 million viewers with a 2.8 in the 18-49 demographics.

=== Critical reviews ===
"/" received critical acclaim from critics. Matt Fowler of IGN gave the episode an "amazing" 9 out of 10 rating and wrote in his verdict, "'/' was an amazing entry, simultaneously humanizing Root while making her into a bit of a patchwork cyborg. From here too, we get a clear glimpse of what the Season 3 endgame will be - with Root even likening Samaritan and The Machine co-existing as being a "war between two Gods." And maybe that's exactly what it is. Modern-era titans going to battle. Our mythology."

Phil Dyess-Nugent of The A.V. Club gave the episode an "A" grade and wrote, "More and more, it's become a show about working toward redemption, which a lot of shows pretend to be just so they'll have an excuse to include lots of scenes in which their unkillable protagonist kicks a lot of ass. It's a measure of how seriously the show takes its theme that every time it adds another hero, the character seems a less likely bet for redemption than any of the previous add-ons."
