= Last and First Men (film) =

- Promotional release poster
- Directed by: Jóhann Jóhannsson
- Screenplay by: Jóhann Jóhannsson; José Enrique Macián
- Based on: Last and First Men by Olaf Stapledon
- Produced by: Þór Sigurjónsson
- Narrated by: Tilda Swinton
- Cinematography: Sturla Brandth Grøvlen
- Edited by: Mark Bukdahl
- Music by: Jóhann Jóhannsson; Yair Elazar Glotman
- Production companies: Zik Zak Filmworks; Icelandic Film Centre
- Distributed by: Films Boutique (international); BFI Distribution (United Kingdom)
- Release date: 25 February 2020 (Berlin)
- Running time: 70 minutes
- Country: Iceland
- Language: English

Last and First Men is a 2020 English-language Icelandic science fiction film directed by Jóhann Jóhannsson, who co-wrote the screenplay with José Enrique Macián. Based on the 1930 novel of the same name by English author Olaf Stapledon, it is the only feature film directed by Jóhannsson, a composer who died of an overdose two years before its release.

The film had its world premiere at the 70th Berlin International Film Festival on 25 February 2020, and was digitally released on 30 July, by BFI Distribution in the United Kingdom. It received widespread critical acclaim.

== Background ==
Icelandic composer Jóhann Jóhannsson directed and scored a multimedia Last and First Men, "combining a film narrated by actress Tilda Swinton and accompanying score played by the BBC Philharmonic" at the 2017 Manchester International Festival. The 16mm black-and-white film is predominantly of memorial sculptures erected in the former SFR Yugoslavia. Jóhann collaborated with José Enrique Macián on writing the narration adapted from Olaf Stapledon's 1930 novel. This was next performed at the Barbican Centre, London in December 2018, and later at Sydney Opera House as part of the Vivid Festival, on 2 June 2019. In 2020, a film of this work was released as Jóhann's debut and final directorial work, with composer and sound artist Yair Elazar Glotman completing the work after Jóhann's death in February 2018. The film had its world premiere at the 70th Berlin International Film Festival on 25 February 2020, and was later screened at other film festivals around the world and released on VOD. It was first released on 30 July 2020 by BFI Distribution in the United Kingdom.

== Production ==
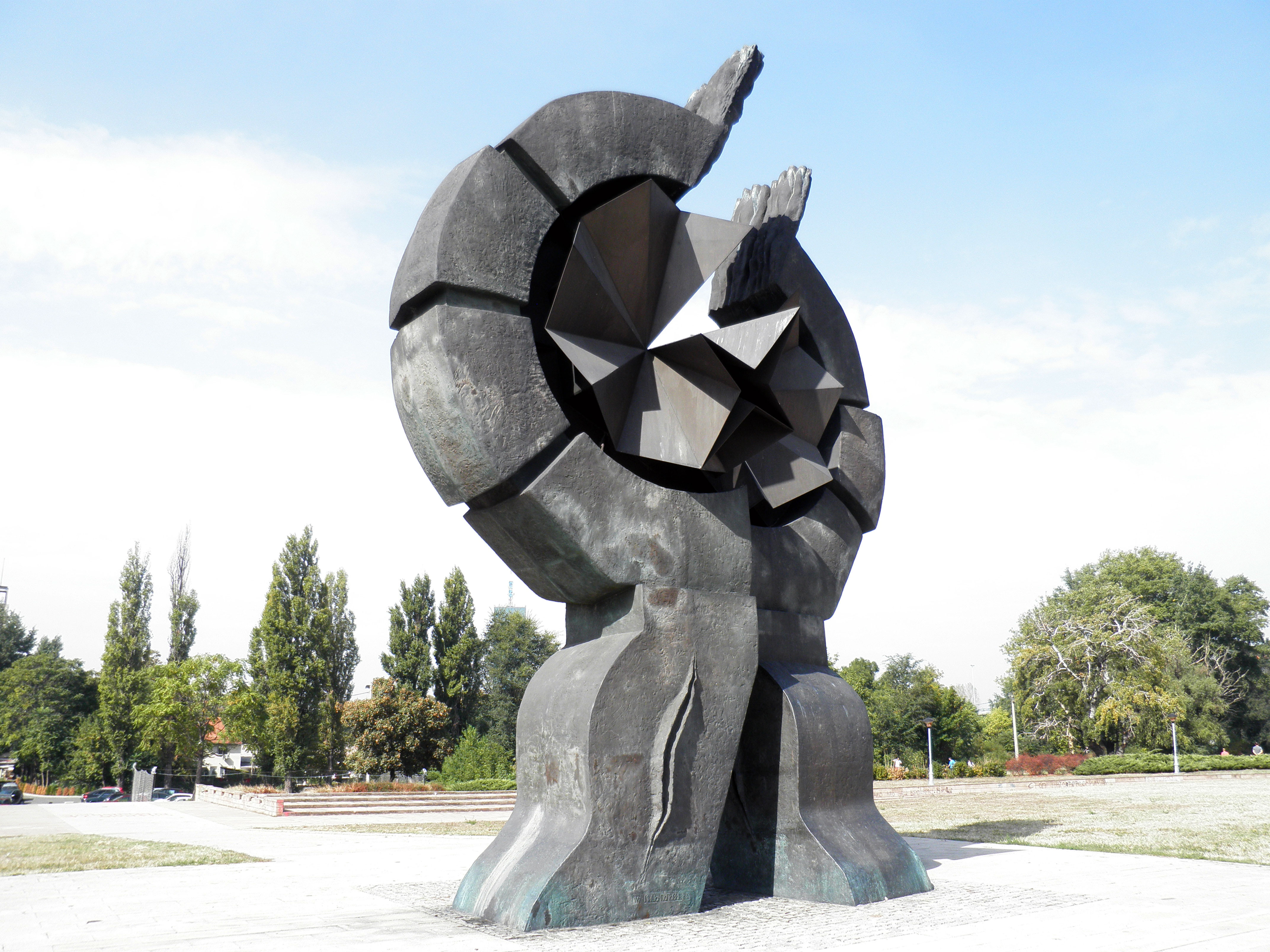
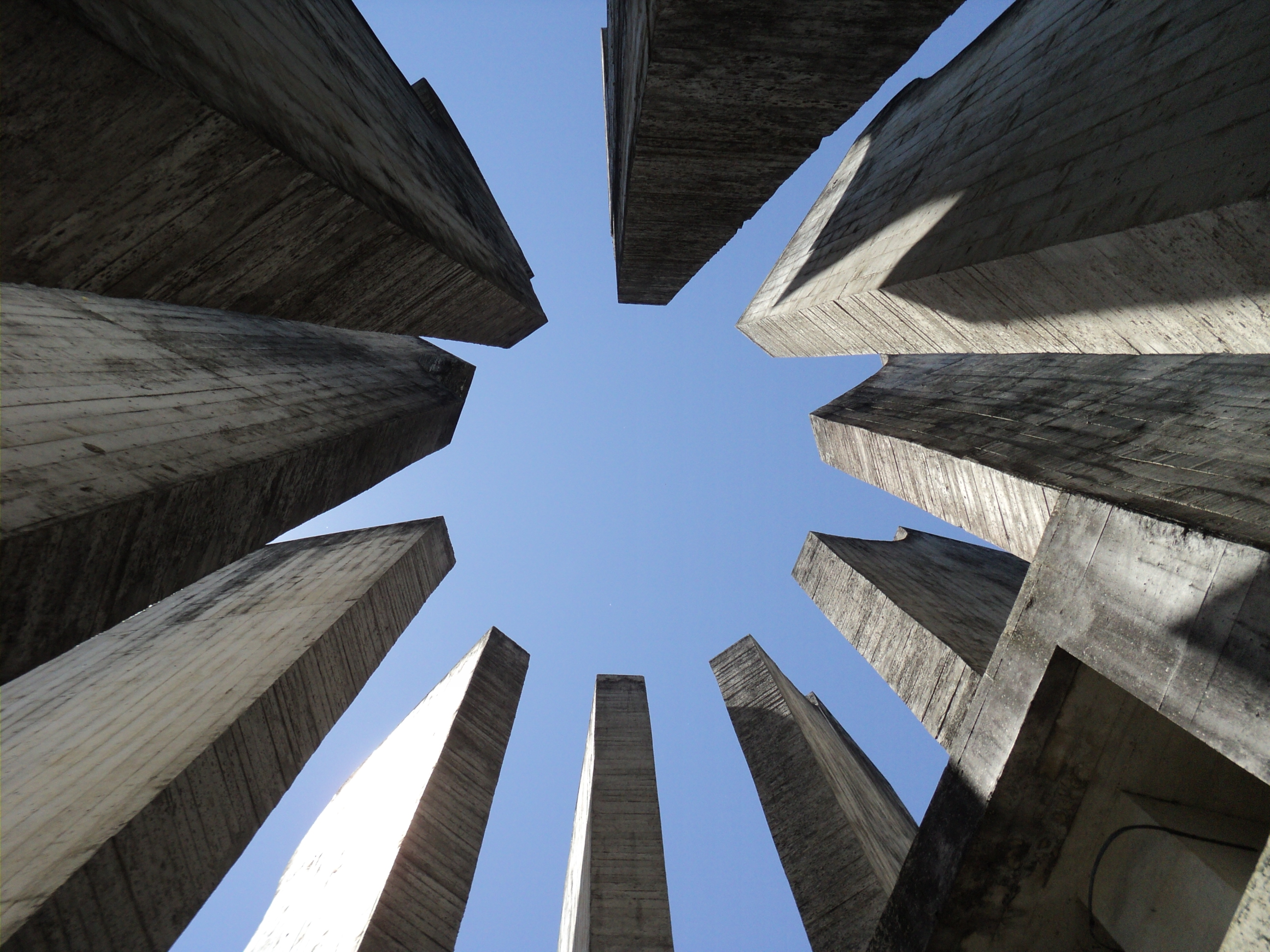
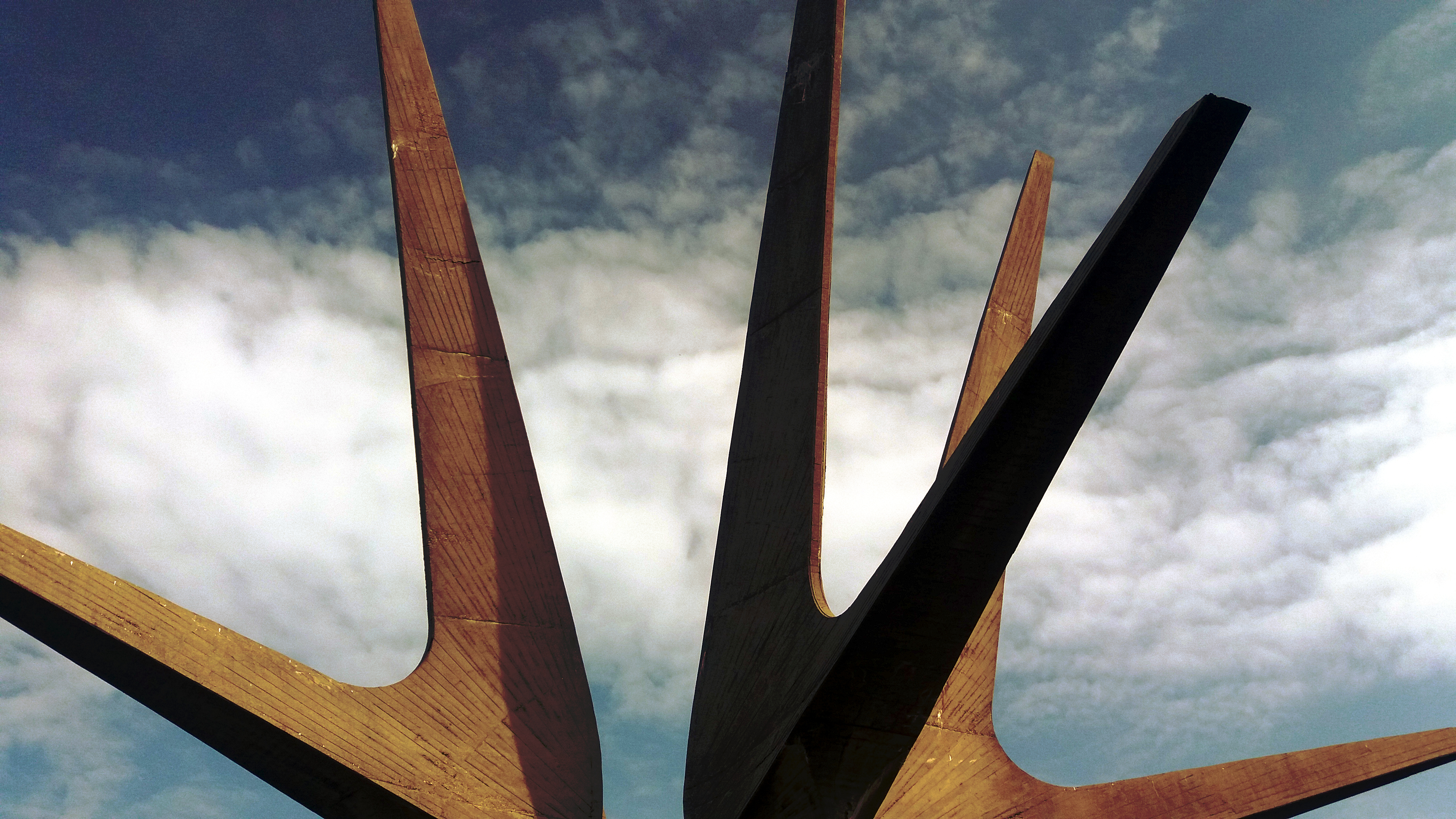
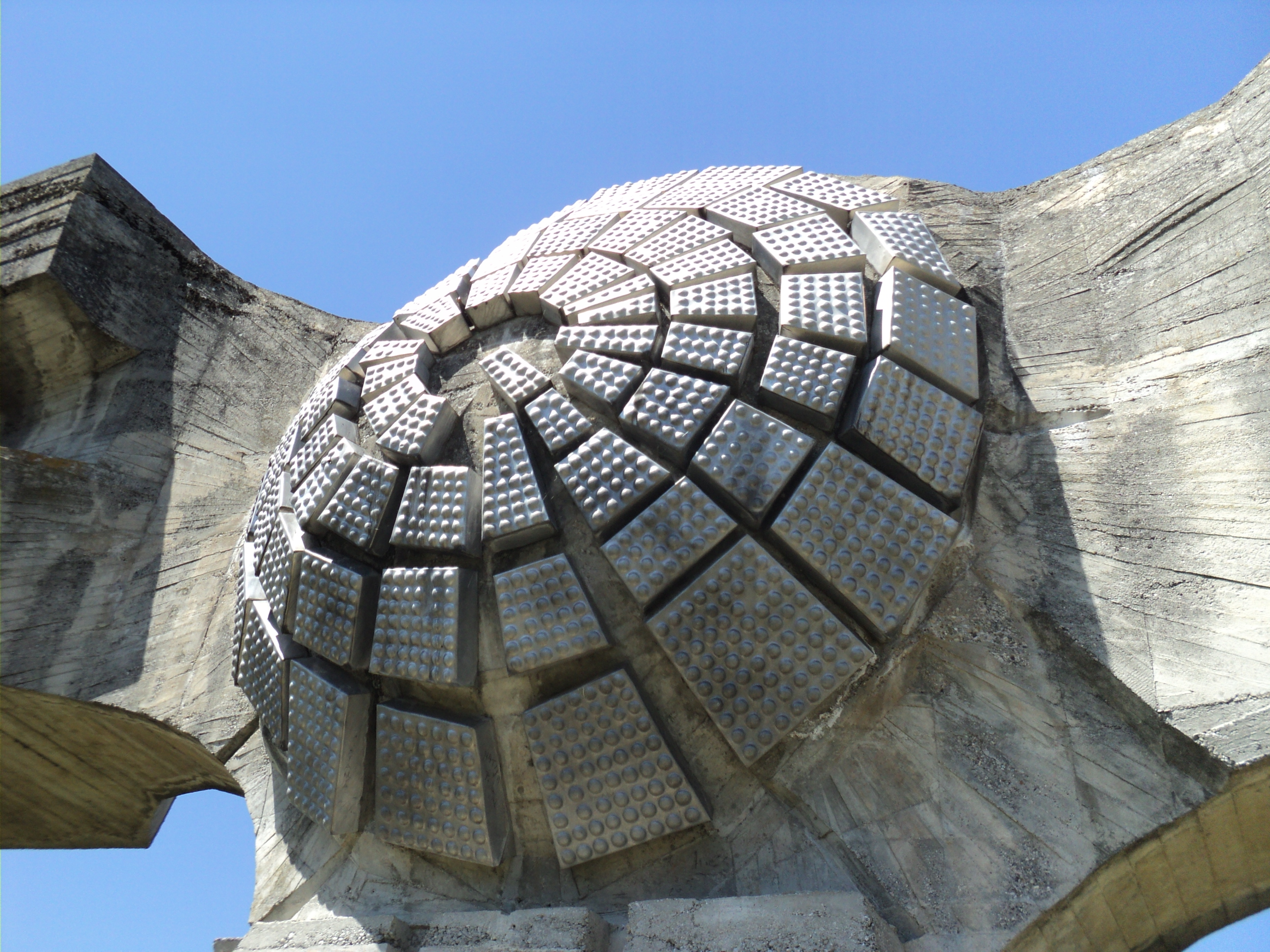
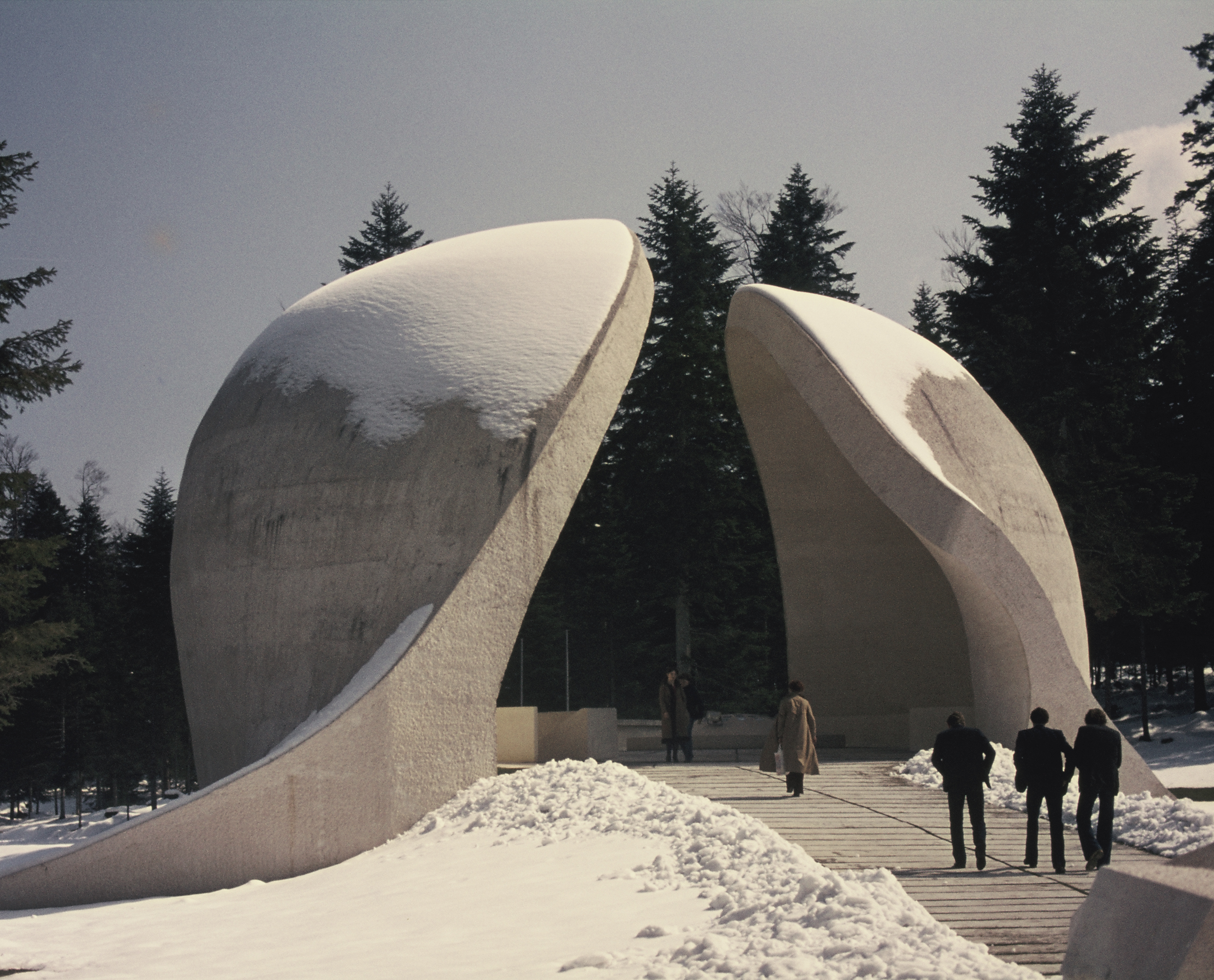
The Spomenik monuments

The film was shot at numerous World War II monuments and memorials in former Yugoslavia in the following locations:

- Podgarić, Croatia
- Sanski Most, Bosnia and Herzegovina
- Tjentište, Bosnia and Herzegovina
- Ostra, Serbia
- Jasenovac, Croatia
- Mostar, Bosnia and Herzegovina
- Niš, Serbia
- Popina, Serbia
- Mitrovica, Kosovo
- Bihać, Bosnia and Herzegovina
- Novi Travnik, Bosnia and Herzegovina
- Petrova Gora, Croatia
- Kadinjača, Serbia
- Nikšić, Montenegro

== Music ==
Last and First Men

Soundtrack album by Jóhann Jóhannsson and Yair Elazar Glotman
- Released: 28 February 2020
- Length: 66:30
- Label: Deutsche Grammophon

The film's soundtrack of the same name, co-composed by Jóhann and Yair Elazar Glotman, was released by Deutsche Grammophon on 28 February 2020.

No.	Title	Length
1.	"Prelude"	2:35
2.	"A Minor Astronomical Event"	3:39
3.	"A Move to Neptune"	3:47
4.	"Physical Description of the Last Human Beings"	4:36
5.	"Architecture"	5:00
6.	"Supreme Monuments"	1:48
7.	"Telepathic Unity"	1:58
8.	"Childhood / Land of the Young"	5:35
9.	"The Navigators"	8:08
10.	"The Sun"	1:28
11.	"A New Doom"	2:54
12.	"Task No. 1: The Scattering of Seeds"	1:56
13.	"Task No. 2: Communicating with the Past"	1:05
14.	"The Last Office of Humanity"	2:11
15.	"Slow Destruction of Neptune"	4:25
16.	"The Few That Prevail"	2:01
17.	"The Last Men"	3:19
18.	"Remembrance of the Past"	2:34
19.	"The Universal End"	1:23
20.	"Epilogue"	5:08
Total length:		66:30

== Reception ==
On the review aggregator website Rotten Tomatoes, 100% of 29 critics' reviews are positive, with an average rating of 8.5/10. Metacritic, which uses a weighted average, assigned the film a score of 80 out of 100, based on 11 critics, indicating "generally favorable" reviews.
