= Reptile (film) =

2023 film by Grant Singer

- Release poster
- Directed by: Grant Singer
- Screenplay by: Grant Singer; Benjamin Brewer; Benicio del Toro
- Story by: Grant Singer; Benjamin Brewer
- Produced by: Molly Smith; Thad Luckinbill; Trent Luckinbill
- Starring: Benicio del Toro; Justin Timberlake; Alicia Silverstone
- Cinematography: Michael Gioulakis
- Edited by: Kevin Hickman
- Music by: Yair Elazar Glotman
- Production company: Black Label Media
- Distributed by: Netflix
- Release dates: September 7, 2023 (TIFF); September 22, 2023 (United States)
- Running time: 136 minutes
- Country: United States
- Language: English

Reptile is a 2023 American crime thriller film directed by Grant Singer in his feature-film directorial debut, from a screenplay he co-wrote with Benjamin Brewer and Benicio del Toro, and a story he co-wrote with Brewer. The film stars del Toro in the lead role, alongside Justin Timberlake, Alicia Silverstone, Eric Bogosian, Ato Essandoh, Domenick Lombardozzi, and Michael Pitt.

It premiered at the Toronto International Film Festival on September 7, 2023, and was released in the United States in select theaters on September 22, 2023, before streaming on Netflix on September 29.

== Plot ==
Will Grady finds his girlfriend, Summer Elswick, brutally murdered in a rural Maine house that they have been showing for sale as realtors. Tom Nichols and his partner Dan Cleary, detectives assigned to the case, question Will who reveals he wanted to marry Summer but could not as she was still married to Sam Gifford. Video from a nearby CCTV camera shows a dark-colored car with a missing hubcap that Dan identifies as a 1990 Buick LeSabre. Later on, Tom's wife Judy correctly identifies the vehicle as a Chrysler Imperial.

After Summer's funeral, Will tells Tom about a man, Eli Phillips, who tried to force his way into his mother's house a few nights earlier. Will explains that when his father ran the family's real estate company, they had forcibly bought Eli's family farm. Eli's father committed suicide, for which Eli blames Will's family. Questioned by Tom and Dan, Eli accuses Will of murdering Summer. Eli has also been researching Tom and mentions a corruption scandal involving Tom's former partner at a Philadelphia police precinct.

DNA analysis of semen found in Summer matches Sam’s DNA, corroborating a friend’s statement that they were still having sex. Tom and Dan return to Sam's with a warrant. Sam grabs Dan's gun and is fatally shot by Tom while attempting to flee. A search of his house finds 13 kilograms of heroin.

The deceased Sam is declared to be Summer's murderer, but Tom is hesitant to consider the case solved. Eli shows up at Tom's house at night and leaves behind a flash drive with evidence that Summer was caught up in a scheme by the Gradys to launder drug money. Properties are planted with drugs and then commandeered via civil asset forfeiture. The Gradys, operating under a shell company called White Fish, then snap up the properties at a discount. Summer was murdered to stop her from reporting the scheme to the DEA.

Evidence points to police officer Wally Finn being behind White Fish, as his private security company (Active Duty Consulting) uses the same post office box as White Fish. Will shows up at Eli's house demanding the flash drive back. Another person shows up. Tom later arrives at Eli's house and finds him missing, his kitchen scrubbed clean and an empty bleach bottle left behind.

Tom attends the birthday party for Captain Robert Allen, his superior officer and Judy's uncle. He attempts to inform Allen of Wally's role in Summer's murder and the money laundering scheme, but is interrupted. Later at the party, Tom discovers a Chrysler Imperial in Allen's garage with a new paint job. Allen finds Tom in the garage and tells him to let the matter go.

On their way home from the party, Tom tells Judy what he knows and, fearing for their safety, says they must leave that night. Allen calls and asks Tom to come over the next morning, where he will explain the matter. Tom agrees. That night, he meets police chief Marty Graeber in an empty parking lot, hands over the drive, and they review its content. The next morning, the two go to Allen's house in separate cars. Marty excuses himself to go to the bathroom as Allen pleads with Tom to leave to save Tom's life before heading upstairs, where Wally fatally shoots him. Tom confronts Marty, who is in on the scheme, in the bathroom. Marty reaches for his gun, but Tom shoots and kills him. He then has a shootout with Wally and subdues him.

The FBI arrests Will as he is golfing.

== Cast ==
- Benicio del Toro as Tom Nichols, a detective
- Justin Timberlake as Will Grady, the victim's boyfriend
- Alicia Silverstone as Judy Nichols, Tom's wife
- Michael Carmen Pitt as Eli Phillips, a suspect
- Eric Bogosian as Captain Robert Allen, Nichols' boss and Judy's uncle
- Ato Essandoh as Dan Cleary, a detective and Tom's partner
- Domenick Lombardozzi as Detective Wally, a friend of Nichols
- Frances Fisher as Camille Grady
- Karl Glusman as Sam Gifford, the victim's ex-husband
- Matilda Lutz as Summer Elswick, the victim
- Mike Pniewski as Chief Marty Graeber, a friend of Nichols
- Thad Luckinbill as Peter
- Sky Ferreira as Renee, the victim's best friend
- Owen Teague as Rudi Rackozy, drug smuggler
- Catherine Dyer as Deena Allen
- Michael Beasley as Victor
- James Devoti as Bennett Rosoff

== Production ==
=== Development ===
On August 26, 2021, Netflix was set to produce the crime thriller script Reptile with music video director Grant Singer set to make his directorial feature film debut and with Molly Smith, Trent Luckinbill, Seth Spector, Thad Luckinbill, Benicio Del Toro, and Rachel Smith as the film’s producers. On October 14, 2021, Singer and Brewer were credited as co-writers.

=== Casting ===
Along with the announcement on August 26, 2021, Del Toro and Justin Timberlake were cast in the film. On September 30, 2021, Alicia Silverstone, Michael Pitt, Ato Essandoh, Frances Fisher, Eric Bogosian, Domenick Lombardozzi, Karl Glusman, Matilda Lutz, Owen Teague, and Catherine Dyer were cast in the film. On October 14, 2021, Mike Pniewski, Thad Luckinbill, Sky Ferreira, James Devoti, and Michael Beasley were cast in the film.

=== Filming ===
On August 15, 2021, filming began in Atlanta, Georgia.

=== Soundtrack ===
The film score was composed by Yair Elazar Glotman, featuring Arca.

== Release ==
Reptile premiered at the Toronto International Film Festival on September 7, 2023. It was originally scheduled to be released by Netflix on October 6, 2023. It was later changed to having a limited release in select theaters in the United States on September 22, 2023, before streaming on Netflix on September 29.

== Reception ==
On the review aggregator website Rotten Tomatoes, 44% of 84 critics' reviews are positive, with an average rating of 5.4/10. The website's consensus reads: "Strong work from Benicio del Toro and Alicia Silverstone isn't enough to make up for Reptile's convoluted and ultimately underwhelming story." Metacritic, which uses a weighted average, assigned the film a score of 52 out of 100, based on 23 critics, indicating "mixed or average" reviews.

On October 10, 2023, Reptile earned the #1 spot for English language films around the world on Netflix with 19.9 million views for the week, and on October 17, 2023, Reptile earned the #1 spot for English language films around the world on Netflix with 14.2 million views; that being its third week in a row as the #1 most viewed English language film globally on Netflix.

On October 19, 2023, TheWrap reported that for the third consecutive week Reptile was the most-watched title of all films and TV shows across any streaming service.
