= Love the Sinner =

2010 play by Drew Pautz

- Original language: English
- Written by: Drew Pautz

Premiere
- Date: 29 July 2010
- Place: Cottesloe Theatre, London, United Kingdom

Love the Sinner is a play by Drew Pautz. It received its world premiere at the Royal National's Cottesloe Theatre on 11 May 2010. The production was directed by Matthew Dunster, with music by Jules Maxwell and sound design by Paul Arditti. The show played its final performance at the Cottesloe Theatre on 10 July 2010.

== Original Cast ==
- Joseph - Fiston Barek
- John / Rev Farley - Paul Bentall
- Hannah / Alison - Nancy Crane
- Michael - Jonathan Cullen
- Tom / Bill - Sam Graham
- Matthew / Harry - Robert Gwilym
- Daniel -Scott Handy
- James / Dave - Fraser James
- Paul - Louis Mahoney
- Shelly - Charlotte Randle
- Stephen - Ian Redford
- Simon / Official - Richard Rees
