= Beta (Person of Interest) =

- Person of Interest episode
- Episode no.: Season 3 Episode 21
- Directed by: Frederick E. O. Toye
- Written by: Sean Hennen & Dan Dietz
- Cinematography by: David Insley
- Editing by: Scott Powell & Scott A. Jacobs
- Production code: 2J7621
- Original air date: April 29, 2014
- Running time: 44 minutes

Guest appearances
- Carrie Preston as Grace Hendricks; John Doman as Senator Ross Garrison; John Nolan as John Greer; Matt Walton as Maybank; John Horton as Priest

Episode chronology
← Previous "Death Benefit"	Next → "A House Divided"

"Beta" is the 21st episode of the third season of the American television drama series Person of Interest. It is the 66th overall episode of the series and is written by Sean Hennen and Dan Dietz and directed by Frederick E. O. Toye. It aired on CBS in the United States and on CTV in Canada on April 29, 2014.

The series revolves around a computer program for the federal government known as "The Machine" that is capable of collating all sources of information to predict terrorist acts and to identify people planning them. A team, consisting of John Reese, Harold Finch and Sameen Shaw follow "irrelevant" crimes: lesser level of priority for the government. In the episode, with Finch disappeared, the team must locate his fiancée when Decima targets her in order to find Finch. The title refers to "Beta test", a software development phase that generally begins when the software is feature complete but likely to contain a number of known or unknown bugs.

According to Nielsen Media Research, the episode was seen by an estimated 11.31 million household viewers and gained a 1.9/5 ratings share among adults aged 18–49. The episode received very positive reviews, with the performances (particularly Michael Emerson and Carrie Preston) receiving the most praise.

== Plot ==
=== Flashbacks ===
In 2010, Grace (Carrie Preston) attends Finch's (Michael Emerson) funeral, being the only one in attendance and laments how no one else was there to appreciate him.

=== Present day ===
After helping the Machine with relevant numbers, Root (Amy Acker) locates Reese (Jim Caviezel) and Shaw (Sarah Shahi) and helps them sneak around the city while avoiding cameras following Samaritan's activation. Having failed to locate Finch, Greer (John Nolan) has decided to locate his closest connection: Grace.

Decima agents attempt to kidnap Grace but are subdued by Reese and Shaw. They take Grace to the precinct with Fusco (Kevin Chapman). They evade many attempts by hitmen to retrieve her; Root causes an explosion in another building to distract the police and allows them to escape. However, Greer's henchman rams their car and kidnaps Grace. Reese, Shaw and Root are forced to escape to New Jersey as it's off-limits to Samaritan. They go to the Red Hook Container Terminal as a possible lead and after fighting off Decima agents, they find Grace's location in Brooklyn and head there, although Root stays behind due to orders from the Machine.

Greer questions Grace, asking her about her life and her connection to Finch. She is oblivious to the fact that he is alive but Greer still does not reveal his status. Reese and Shaw arrive at the location but they only find a technician who commits suicide to avoid speaking. Greer talks to them through a surveillance feed and tells them to give them Finch in exchange for Grace. Thanks to a tip from Root, Reese and Shaw find Finch outside Grace's house, who planned to save her before realizing it was too late. Finch agrees to the exchange but tells Reese and Shaw that if Decima harms Grace, they must kill them.

The next day, the exchange takes place at a bridge. A blindfolded Grace is allowed to walk to one side while Finch walks towards the other. They briefly touch when she almost falls but she still doesn't recognize it's Finch. Grace is safely escorted off the bridge while Finch is taken by Decima agents. At her house, Grace is given (unknown to her, by Finch) a fake ID so she can flee to Italy with a new job and to avoid Decima. In another location, Greer shows Garrison (John Doman) the use of Samaritan to catch a terrorist and earns his trust. Unknown to Garrison, Samaritan starts losing its feeds. With its beta test complete, Samaritan shuts down. Root then shows to Reese and Shaw that she has stolen seven computer servers meant for Samaritan. The episode ends as Greer finally meets with Finch at an undisclosed building to talk.

== Reception ==
=== Viewers ===
In its original American broadcast, "Beta" was seen by an estimated 11.31 million household viewers and gained a 1.9/6 ratings share among adults aged 18–49, according to Nielsen Media Research. This means that 1.9 percent of all households with televisions watched the episode, while 6 percent of all households watching television at that time watched it. This was a 5% increase in viewership from the previous episode, which was watched by 10.74 million viewers with a 1.8/5 in the 18-49 demographics. With these ratings, Person of Interest was the third most watched show on CBS for the night, behind NCIS: Los Angeles and NCIS, first on its timeslot and fifth for the night in the 18-49 demographics, behind Agents of S.H.I.E.L.D., NCIS: Los Angeles, NCIS, and The Voice.

With Live +7 DVR factored in, the episode was watched by 15.13 million viewers with a 2.8 in the 18-49 demographics.

=== Critical reviews ===
"Beta" received very positive reviews from critics. Matt Fowler of IGN gave the episode a "great" 8.5 out of 10 rating and wrote in his verdict, "'Beta' wound up being unexpectedly emotional and more subdued than I anticipated. Which isn't a bad thing. In fact, it helped give a bit more gravitas to the Season 3 endgame. And it worked to turn Greer into a more rounded individual, as maniacal as he is. I also like not fully knowing what Greer's ultimate goal is. I get that Samaritan is to become much more than a surveillance machine. Something that thinks and learns. But what does Greer need, other than approval from the government, to take the next steps? Is there a missing piece of tech? Also, did he need the seven giant servers Root swiped, or does he still have enough? All good questions to have heading into the final two. At this point, it's enough to know that he's got larger, more nefarious plans."

LaToya Ferguson of The A.V. Club gave the episode an "A" grade and wrote, "As if Person of Interest weren't already firing on all cylinders this season, there's now a clash of the mixed metaphorical titans, if you will. Person of Interest isn't winding down as its third season comes to an end; in fact, I'll be shocked if it doesn't completely drive off a cliff (in the best way possible, of course) come finale time."

Sean McKenna of TV Fanatic gave the episode a 4.7 star rating out of 5 and wrote "This was another very solid hour of Person of Interest Season 3 with great action, a building story, tragic personal sacrifice and a mysterious and compelling future for the series."
