= Most Likely To... =

- Person of Interest episode
- Episode no.: Season 3 Episode 19
- Directed by: Kevin Hooks
- Written by: Melissa Scrivner Love & Denise Thé
- Cinematography by: David Insley
- Editing by: Ryan Malanaphy
- Production code: 2J7619
- Original air date: April 1, 2014
- Running time: 44 minutes

Guest appearances
- Néstor Carbonell as Matthew Reed; John Doman as Senator Ross Garrison; Leslie Odom Jr. as Peter Collier; Rob McClure as Doug Hemmill; James McMenamin as Toke; Rosa Arredondo as Alice; Joe Coots as Jack Tanner; Camryn Manheim as Control

Episode chronology
← Previous "Allegiance"	Next → "Death Benefit"

"Most Likely To..." is the 19th episode of the third season of the American television drama series Person of Interest. It is the 64th overall episode of the series and is written by producer Melissa Scrivner Love and Denise Thé and directed by Kevin Hooks. It aired on CBS in the United States and on CTV in Canada on April 1, 2014.

The series revolves around a computer program for the federal government known as "The Machine" that is capable of collating all sources of information to predict terrorist acts and to identify people planning them. A team, consisting of John Reese, Harold Finch and Sameen Shaw follow "irrelevant" crimes: lesser level of priority for the government. In the episode, Reese and Shaw infiltrate a high school reunion to investigate their new number. Meanwhile, Finch and Fusco go to Washington, D.C. to learn more about a failed mission and its important role in the government.

According to Nielsen Media Research, the episode was seen by an estimated 11.45 million household viewers and gained a 1.9/6 ratings share among adults aged 18–49. The episode received very positive reviews, with critics praising the ending and its ramifications in the rest of the series.

== Plot ==
Reese (Jim Caviezel) and Shaw (Sarah Shahi) are watching over Leona Wainwright, their new number. She gets into a taxi where the driver is revealed to be a hitman. Reese tries to intervene but the driver detonates a grenade, killing himself and Wainwright. Finch (Michael Emerson) discovers that the hitman belonged to Vigilance. In Washington, D.C., Senator Ross Garrison (John Doman) meets with Control (Camryn Manheim) to talk about the explosion.

The team receives a new number: Matthew Reed (Néstor Carbonell), a prosecutor. Reese and Shaw go to Westchester County, New York for a high school reunion that Reed will attend while Finch and Fusco (Kevin Chapman) go to Washington to learn more about Wainwright, who worked for the government by managing security clearances. At the reunion, Reese and Shaw use real names and meet with many of the guests, including Reed, who takes a liking to Shaw. During the reunion, Reed is intimidated by images of the death of his girlfriend in high school. During a dance, Reese is attacked by a Vigilance hitman. He defeats him but the hitman commits suicide to avoid speaking.

It's revealed that Reed himself did everything in the reunion, blaming his friend Doug (Rob McClure) for his girlfriend's death. Doug suspected Reed abused her so Doug gave her Hydrocodone to help her, which may have led to her accident and death. Reed plans to kill him and make it appear as a suicide but is interrupted by Reese and Shaw. Suddenly, Vigilance assassins attack them, due to Root (Amy Acker) leaking their location to distract Vigilance from Finch's mission. Reese and Shaw defeat them and Doug is arrested while Reed may face charges for his homicide attempt.

Finch and Fusco go to the Office of Personnel Management to get more evidence on Wainwright's murder. Fusco distracts the guard while Finch enters into the evidence room. Finch obtains her file but is confronted by Collier (Leslie Odom Jr.), who confronts him about the Machine and its purpose. Root saves them but Collier escapes with highly classified information. Collier leaks the documents, exposing Northern Lights to the world. Garrison publicly denies the existence of the Machine and orders Control to shut it down. She gives the command, and shreds Collier's eyes-only file. With its Primary Operations compromised, the Machine restructures, transferring massive amounts of red-flagged data to Tertiary Operations: Root, the only owner of the relevant numbers.

== Reception ==
=== Viewers ===
In its original American broadcast, "Most Likely To..." was seen by an estimated 11.45 million household viewers and gained a 1.9/6 ratings share among adults aged 18–49, according to Nielsen Media Research. This means that 1.9 percent of all households with televisions watched the episode, while 6 percent of all households watching television at that time watched it. This was a 7% decrease in viewership from the previous episode, which was watched by 12.23 million viewers with a 2.0/6 in the 18-49 demographics. With these ratings, Person of Interest was the third most watched show on CBS for the night, behind NCIS: Los Angeles and NCIS, first on its timeslot and sixth for the night in the 18-49 demographics, behind Agents of S.H.I.E.L.D., About a Boy, NCIS: Los Angeles, NCIS, and The Voice.

With Live +7 DVR factored in, the episode was watched by 15.42 million viewers with a 2.8 in the 18-49 demographics.

=== Critical reviews ===
"Most Likely To..." received very positive reviews from critics. Matt Fowler of IGN gave the episode a "great" 8.4 out of 10 rating and wrote in his verdict, "From a humor standpoint, some of 'Most Likely To...' worked and some of it didn't. It's enjoyable to watch Shaw piss and moan about everything, but Reese is usually left holding the 'What's the matter, Shaw? You don't like X, Y, Z' bag. Vigilance using the media to shut down Northern Lights was a nice move and it makes me wonder how valuable Root will be going forward now that she's the only competition for Samaritan. Overall, despite some bumps, I was happy that Vigilance stayed a constant threat to everyone here, no matter their storyline."

Phil Dyess-Nugent of The A.V. Club gave the episode a "B+" grade and wrote, "Person Of Interest's vision of a secret war over the apparatus of the security state involves so much plot machinery running on so many different interlocking tracks that the show might just seem mechanical if the people involved weren't so vivid."

Sean McKenna of TV Fanatic gave the episode a 4.8 star rating out of 5 and wrote "This hour really had a lot of fun with its characters and story, while maintaining progression on the bigger picture. It's hard to believe the series has come so far since the Pilot, but there's definitely a feeling that the showrunners and writers have a solid plan in place."
