= False Positive (film) =

2021 film

- Official poster
- Directed by: John Lee
- Screenplay by: John Lee; Ilana Glazer
- Story by: John Lee; Ilana Glazer; Alissa Nutting
- Produced by: Ilana Glazer; John Lee; Jonathan Wang; Allison Rose Carter
- Starring: Ilana Glazer; Justin Theroux; Pierce Brosnan
- Cinematography: Pawel Pogorzelski
- Edited by: Jon Philpot
- Music by: Yair Elazar Glotman; Lucy Railton
- Production company: A24
- Distributed by: Hulu
- Release dates: June 18, 2021 (Tribeca); June 25, 2021
- Running time: 92 minutes
- Country: United States
- Language: English

False Positive is a 2021 American psychological horror film directed by John Lee from a screenplay he co-wrote with Ilana Glazer. The film stars Glazer, Justin Theroux, and Pierce Brosnan.

False Positive had its world premiere at the Tribeca Film Festival on June 18, 2021 and was released in the United States by Hulu on June 25, 2021.

== Plot ==
Copywriter Lucy Martin lives with her husband Adrian in Manhattan. The couple have been trying to conceive for two years and decide to seek out Dr. John Hindle, Adrian's former teacher and a leading fertility doctor. Lucy becomes pregnant after Dr. Hindle inseminates her, using a technique he invented. During an ultrasound she discovers she is pregnant with triplets: male twins and a female. Hindle suggests a selective reduction; either the twins or the daughter should be terminated to ensure a healthy pregnancy and birth. Adrian and Lucy decide to keep the girl. Lucy joins a group of expecting mothers, where she befriends Corgan, who got pregnant using IVF. Online, Lucy discovers Grace Singleton, a spiritual midwife with a natural approach and develops a fascination with her.

During the reduction, Lucy passes out and hears Adrian and Hindle talk. Later, she bleeds excessively from her uterus, which Hindle dismisses as a common instance. Adrian presents Hindle with an award and Lucy grows wary of him. Lucy finds a safe in Adrian's office and shares with Corgan her growing suspicions that Hindle did something to her unborn daughter and Adrian is aware. After Lucy has further complications, Hindle blames this on antenatal depression and prescribes her medication, which she takes. After having a dream where she sees Hindle and Adrian having sex, Lucy opens Adrian's safe and finds a file on her, including evidence that she is being monitored. Corgan takes the file to show her lawyer husband and suggests that Lucy behave normally until she knows more. Lucy confronts Adrian, admitting she doesn't feel safe with Hindle. Lucy experiences further strange dreams and visions including nearly drowning in a bath full of bloody water.

During her baby shower, Lucy realizes that Corgan knows her real name, despite never having shared it. Corgan gifts her a copy of a first edition of J. M. Barrie's book Peter Pan and Wendy and Lucy seems to see Peter Pan's shadow morph into a weird expanding bloodstain on the book cover. Lucy confronts her and Corgan admits that she now consults Hindle too and that she gave the file to Adrian due to her worry about Lucy's mental state. She tells Lucy that Adrian denies he has a safe in his office. Lucy experiences contractions and goes to Grace to give birth, discovering she is giving birth to the male twins instead of the female baby. Before she can birth the second twin, Grace urges them to a hospital after strong bleeding but Adrian takes her to Hindle, who delivers the second baby. Disillusioned and depressed, Lucy talks to Grace but realizes that the image of her as an African-American midwife 'goddess' was unrealistic and elaborated. Grace tells Lucy that she must solve her own problem.

Lucy goes to Hindle's clinic to confront him, where she is shocked to learn Adrian will join Hindle's gynecological practice. Lucy sneaks into a secret room labelled "The Lab" in the clinic, where she finds her removed placenta and reduced female fetus. Hindle reveals it was his sperm used for inseminating Lucy, as he does with all his patients, believing his genes to be superior. He has a refrigerator full of vials of his own sperm which are used to inseminate his female patients and spread his own bloodline further through the world through male births. He attempts to drug Lucy but she kicks him and smashes his head with a mirror, then restrains him to a medical chair, after which she is attacked by a nurse, Dawn. She drugs Dawn and beats Hindle bloody, destroying his refrigerator full of sperm vials and leaving the office with the fetus.

Arriving home, she imagines herself releasing the twins to float out the window (a reference to the Peter Pan and Wendy submotif of the narrative). When Adrian comes home, he claims that the deal with Hindle would have been good for them both. Unsatisfied, Lucy gives Adrian the twins and orders him to leave. She then picks up the female fetus and attempts to breastfeed, hallucinating that it begins to suckle.

== Cast ==
- Ilana Glazer as Lucia "Lucy" Martin
- Justin Theroux as Adrian Martin
- Pierce Brosnan as Dr. John Hindle
- Gretchen Mol as Nurse Dawn
- Sophia Bush as Corgan
- Zainab Jah as Grace Singleton
- Josh Hamilton as Greg
- Sabina Gadecki as Nurse Rita
- Jaygee Macapugay as Mae
- Danielle Slavick as Brin
- Lucy Walters as Marcy
- Kelly AuCoin as Dirk
- Nils Lawton as Mihail
- Sullivan Jones as Bryon
- Francesca Faridany as Coraline

== Production ==
In February 2019, it was announced Ilana Glazer would star in the film, with John Lee producing from a screenplay by himself and Glazer. A24 would produce. In March 2019, Pierce Brosnan, Zainab Jah, Gretchen Mol, Sophia Bush and Josh Hamilton joined the cast of the film.

=== Filming ===
Principal photography began in April 2019.

== Release ==
In December 2020, Hulu acquired U.S. distribution rights to the film. It had its world premiere at the Tribeca Film Festival on June 18, 2021. The film was released on Hulu on June 25, 2021.

== Reception ==
False Positive holds a 47% approval rating on review aggregator website Rotten Tomatoes based on 85 reviews with a weighted average of 5.5/10. The website's critics consensus reads: "Its classic horror aims exceed its blood-slicked grasp, but False Positive works its way sneakily under the skin." On Metacritic, the film holds a rating of 54 out of 100, based on 21 critics, indicating "mixed or average" reviews.

The Hollywood Reporter gave the film a positive review calling it "a juicy genre entry" while conceding it "might not quite stick the landing." The A.V. Club gave the film a B− rating but said "for a movie with this much blood, it doesn't leave much of a stain." IndieWire gave the film a D+ and criticized its obvious debts to other films such as Rosemary's Baby.
