= Yair Elazar Glotman =

German Israeli composer and musician (born 1987)

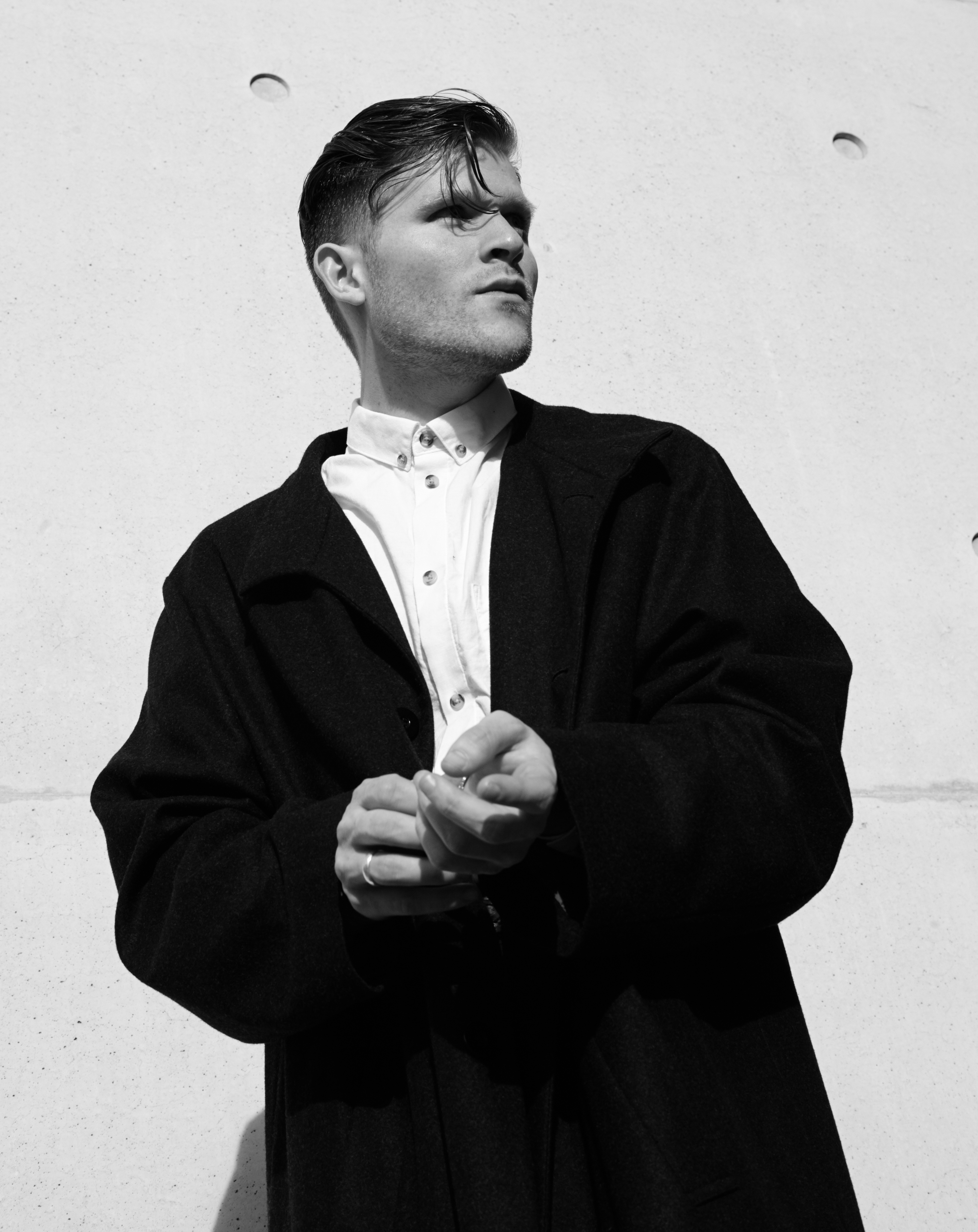

Background information
- Occupations: Composer; Musician; Sound artist
- Instruments: Double bass; Bass guitar; Gimbri; Guitar
- Labels: Deutsche Grammophon, 130701, Bedroom Community, Miasmah, Subtext
- Website: Yair Elazar Glotman

Yair Elazar Glotman is a composer and musician based in Berlin.

He releases solo music and composes film scores, Including original scores for Louis Leterrier's Netflix sci-fi thriller The Last House, Grant Singer's Netflix thriller Reptile, A24's False Positive (co-composed with Lucy Railton), and Jóhann Jóhannsson’s Last and First Men. Beyond his lead scoring work, Glotman has contributed contrabass recordings, additional music, and arrangements to major film productions, including the Academy Award–winning scores for Joker and All Quiet on the Western Front, as well as works for stage productions such as the Royal Opera House in London. His practice across film, performance, and recording is anchored in his background as an orchestral contrabass player and electroacoustic composer, utilizing extended instrumental techniques, improvisation, and combined analog and digital processing.

== Early life ==
Glotman studied orchestral double bass at the Berlin University of the Arts under Prof. Michael Wolf. He later expanded his studies to include electroacoustic composition as well as media and sound art under Prof. Dr. phil. Alberto de Campo. He completed his Meisterschule degree in 2015

== Musical career ==
In recent years, Glotman has been increasingly composing for film and media, all the while continuing to release music under his own name and in collaboration with other composers.

=== Film and TV score work ===
Glotman’s work for film has included co-composing False Positive (2021) with Lucy Railton, an A24 production written by Ilana Glazer and John Lee. In 2018, he began collaborating with the influential, late composer Jóhann Jóhannsson on his directorial debut Last and First Men, developing the film score and recording for him. Glotman also worked with him as additional music composer for Mandy (2018) and recorded for other projects. After Jóhannsson's passing, Glotman was tasked with co-composing and producing the score of Last and First Men. The film premiered at the 70th Berlin International Film Festival in February 2020, and the soundtrack album was released by Deutsche Grammophon. He went on to compose the original score for Grant Singer’s 2023 Netflix film noir thriller Reptile, starring Benicio del Toro, and Louis Leterrier's 2026 Netflix sci-fi thriller The Last House, starring Greta Lee and Wagner Moura. Beyond his original scoring work, Glotman has contributed as a contrabass soloist, instrumentalist, and additional composer to major scores by other creators, including the Academy Award-winning scores for Hildur Guðnadóttir's Joker (2019) and Volker Bertelmann's All Quiet on the Western Front (2022).

=== Solo Work ===
Under his own name, Glotman has released music that is directly tied to his training and relationship with the double bass. Études (2015) was an attempt at disrupting the learned habits of playing a classical instrument and exploring hidden resonances, physical vibrations, and the outer edges of the instrument's acoustic dynamic range. Compound (2017) expands these experiments to a trio, adding pianist Rieko Okuda and percussionist Marcello Silvio Busato into the musical conversation.

His subsequent solo releases under his own name include Speculative Memories (2022) on Scrawl Recordings. He is signed as a solo recording artist to Universal Music Publishing Decca / Classics & Screen.

Glotman’s solo projects include KETEV, a dark techno / Ambient project under which he released albums on the labels Opal Tapes, Where To Now? and Portals Editions. In addition, he has released under Blessed Initiative, an Electroacoustic project on the label Subtext.

=== Collaborations ===
Glotman has worked closely with musical collaborators. Together with Swedish composer Mats Erlandsson he has released three albums, and with Icelandic violinist and composer Viktor Orri Árnason he has released an album on the Icelandic Label Bedroom Community.

== Discography ==
Title	Album details
Nimbes (with James Ginzburg)	Released: January 11, 2014; Label: Subtext
KETEV (as Ketev)	Released: March 29, 2014; Label: Opal Tapes
Northern Gulfs	Released: April 1, 2014; Label: Glacial Movements
Singular Stare (as Ketev)	Released: August 4, 2014; Label: Where To Now?
Études	Released: July 25, 2015; Label: Subtext
Traces Of Weakness (as Ketev)	Released: January 15, 2016; Label: Where To Now?
I Know No Weekend (as Ketev)	Released: July 1, 2016; Label: Portals Editions
Blessed Initiative (as Blessed Initiative)	Released: October 18, 2016; Label: Subtext
Negative Chambers (with Mats Erlandsson)	Released: July 13, 2018; Label: Miasmah
Compound	Released: October 6, 2017; Label: Subtext
Vast (with Viktor Orri Árnason)	Released: August 30, 2019; Label: Bedroom Community
Last and First Men (with Jóhann Jóhannsson)	Released: February 28, 2020; Label: Deutsche Grammophon
Emanate (with Mats Erlandsson)	Released: May 15, 2020; Label: FatCat Records
Speculative Memories	Released: October 27, 2022; Label: SA Recordings
Glory Fades (with Mats Erlandsson)	Released: January 17, 2025; Label: XKatedral

== Filmography ==
Year	Film	Director	Credits
2026	The Last House	Louis Leterrier	Composer
2023	Reptile	Grant Singer	Composer
2020	False Positive	John Lee	Composer
2019	Last and First Men	Jóhann Jóhannsson	Composer
2018	Mandy	Panos Cosmatos	Composer, additional music
2018	My Unknown Soldier	Anna Kryvenko	Composer

== Awards and nominations ==
Year	Award	Nomination	Film	Result	Notes
2021	Edda Award	Best Music	Last and First Men	Nominated	Shared with Jóhann Jóhannsson
2022	ASCAP Screen Music Award	Original Score in Streaming Film	False Positive	Won	Shared with Lucy Railton
