= RAM (Person of Interest) =

- Person of Interest episode
- Episode no.: Season 3 Episode 16
- Directed by: Stephen Surjik
- Written by: Nic Van Zeebroeck & Michael Sopczynski
- Cinematography by: Manuel Billeter
- Editing by: Ryan Malanaphy
- Production code: 2J7616
- Original air date: March 4, 2014
- Running time: 44 minutes

Guest appearances
- Camryn Manheim as Control; Neil Jackson as Rick Dillinger; Joe Mazzello as Daniel Casey; Jay O. Sanders as Special Counsel; John Nolan as John Greer; Julian Ovenden as Justin Lambert; Casey Siemaszko as Lester Strickland; Annie Parisse as Kara Stanton

Episode chronology
← Previous "Last Call"	Next → "/"

"RAM" is the 16th episode of the third season of the American television drama series Person of Interest. It is the 61st overall episode of the series and is written by Nic Van Zeebroeck & Michael Sopczynski and directed by Stephen Surjik. It aired on CBS in the United States and on CTV in Canada on March 4, 2014.

The series revolves around a computer program for the federal government known as "The Machine" that is capable of collating all sources of information to predict terrorist acts and to identify people planning them. A team, consisting of John Reese, Harold Finch and Sameen Shaw follow "irrelevant" crimes: lesser level of priority for the government. In the episode, set in 2010 besides the final scene, chronicles Finch's relationship with his partner Rick Dillinger and their new number, which sets off many important and disastrous events. The title refers to random-access memory, a form of computer memory that can be read and changed in any order, typically used to store working data and machine code. Despite being credited, Kevin Chapman does not appear in the episode.

According to Nielsen Media Research, the episode was seen by an estimated 10.64 million household viewers and gained a 1.7/5 ratings share among adults aged 18–49. The episode received critical acclaim, with critics praising the writing, use of flashbacks, answers to questions and performances, with many naming it one of the series' best episodes.

== Plot ==
In 2010, Finch (Michael Emerson) is operating the Machine with a field agent: Rick Dillinger (Neil Jackson), a Blackwater mercenary known for being straightforward. They start working on their new number: Daniel Casey (Joe Mazzello), a programmer who disappeared a few months ago.

Dillinger meets with Lester Strickland (Casey Siemaszko), who used to know Casey, to get information. Dillinger brings up the subject of Casey, introducing himself as a colleague. He clones Lester's phone and finds that Casey is alive and is anticipating a package that will arrive the next day. He also discovers that a man and a woman already met with Lester to ask about Casey already. Dillinger finds the man and woman: John Reese (Jim Caviezel) and Kara Stanton (Annie Parisse). They are pursuing Casey for stealing state secrets and also notice Dillinger across the street, correctly deducing his mercenary background. Dillinger sees as Reese puts a bug on Casey's jacket.

Dillinger follows Casey to a café and sees SSCI Agent Ian Banks (Julian Ovenden) meeting with Casey. Casey realizes the man is an imposter and flees. Dillinger catches up to him but Reese and Kara arrive and take Casey on a car. However, they are attacked by hitmen. Reese and Kara hold them off but Dillinger and Casey escape. Dillinger presses Casey to reveal anything and he explains that the government contacted him to breach a computer system (the Machine), which worries Finch. Dillinger brings Casey to the Library for protection.

In Washington, D.C., Control (Camryn Manheim) meets with Special Counsel (Jay O. Sanders), remarking about the recent events on New York and their problem with Casey. Special Counsel suggests things would've been easier had they not killed Nathan Ingram but Control maintains they did the right thing. Back in New York, Reese and Kara torture one of the hitmen to get more information on his employer but the man escapes and jumps off the building to his death. Finch talks with Casey, who confesses that he has a laptop that may be enough to hack the system and creating an advanced code. When he couldn't crack it, the Government ordered his death but he escaped thanks to a car accident. Unaware to them, their conversation is heard by Dillinger, who planted a bug in the Library.

The imposter, Jeremy Lambert, meets with his employer, John Greer (John Nolan). He is ordered to track Casey. Finch arranges for the code to be sold in the "Darknet" and gives him a fake ID so he can avoid the CIA. Dillinger arrives and poisons Finch so he falls unconscious, he intends to sell the laptop to China and leave Casey on his own. Casey contacts Lester to give him another fake ID but Kara already got to Lester. Lambert and his team arrive at Lester's location but Kara kills everyone except for Lambert, who flees.

Reese intercepts Casey just as Finch awoke to limp himself and drive the car to find him. Despite his orders, Reese spares Casey, gives him instructions to flee the country and removes one of Casey's teeth to use as proof of his "death". Reese and Kara leave New York for Morocco for their new mission. Finch catches up to Dillinger in Central Park but he threatens him not to follow him. Dillinger meets with the Chinese but their meeting is intercepted by an assassin sent by Special Counsel, who fatally wounds Dillinger and causes the Chinese's car to crash. However, one of them escapes with the laptop. The assassin is revealed to be Shaw (Sarah Shahi), who kills a wounded Dillinger as Finch watches from afar, although he is not able to identify her. Finch ends up burying Dillinger in the park. Special Counsel finds that the laptop has been located in Ordos, China and orders the CIA to send Reese and Kara to retrieve it, setting off subsequent events in the series.

In February 2014, Casey is living in solitude in Canada when someone knocks at his door. He opens it to find Root (Amy Acker), who gives him instructions to go to Cartagena, Colombia and seek out Jason Greenfield before she explodes his cabin.

== Reception ==
=== Viewers ===
In its original American broadcast, "RAM" was seen by an estimated 10.64 million household viewers and gained a 1.7/5 ratings share among adults aged 18–49, according to Nielsen Media Research. This means that 1.7 percent of all households with televisions watched the episode, while 5 percent of all households watching television at that time watched it. This was a 4% decrease in viewership from the previous episode, which was watched by 11.00 million viewers with a 1.8/5 in the 18-49 demographics. With these ratings, Person of Interest was the third most watched show on CBS for the night, behind NCIS: Los Angeles and NCIS, second on its timeslot and eighth for the night in the 18-49 demographics, behind Agents of S.H.I.E.L.D., Chicago Fire, Growing Up Fisher, NCIS: Los Angeles, About a Boy, NCIS, and The Voice.

With Live +7 DVR factored in, the episode was watched by 15.32 million viewers with a 2.7 in the 18-49 demographics.

=== Critical reviews ===
"RAM" received critical acclaim from critics. Matt Fowler of IGN gave the episode an "amazing" 9.4 out of 10 rating and wrote in his verdict, "'RAM' was the greatest delivery of a flashback Person of Interest has had in a while. A very entertaining use of the 'world of the show,' demonstrating to us just how all the pieces, from other flashbacks over the past seasons, fit together and how all the characters are connected. It was fun watching Finch work with a classless merc like Dillinger, but even more satisfying to see how dark it all turned for everyone involved. Plus, just a ton of 'rad' surprises along the way."

Phil Dyess-Nugent of The A.V. Club gave the episode an "A" grade and wrote, "At a point in its life where many network genre shows are running on fumes, Person of Interest continues to be a show that's constantly reassembling itself in ways that make it change shape and expand in your head as you're watching it."
