= Texas Shakespeare Festival =

Coordinates: 32.377932°N 94.86894°W

The Texas Shakespeare Festival is a professional summer theatre housed in the Anne Dean Turk Fine Arts Center on the campus of Kilgore College, Kilgore, Texas. TSF presents four weeks of performances during late June and July of five productions in repertory: two plays by Shakespeare, a classic, a musical, and a children's show.

== History ==
Established in 1986, the Texas Shakespeare Festival began as Kilgore College's contribution to the Texas Sesquicentennial celebration. The brainchild of Raymond Caldwell, a faculty member within the theatre program at Kilgore College and subsequent Artistic Director of the Festival, the first season of TSF consisted of two plays by Shakespeare and The Daisy Bradford 3, a regional work commissioned for the celebration telling the story of the East Texas oil boom by Gifford Wingate, all performed by a small company of professional actors. The overwhelming popularity and quality of the summer theatre experience for the people of East Texas catapulted what was to have been a one-time event into an organization that is celebrating its second decade of performances. More than 1000 theatre artists have worked at TSF including such well-known personalities as Michael C. Hall (Six Feet Under; Dexter); Danny Pino (Cold Case); Glenn Fleshler (Spring Awakening; Guys and Dolls); Rick Holmes (Spamalot); Andrew Samonsky (South Pacific; Tick, Tick... Boom!); Glenn Kessler (Creator, Producer, Director and Actor for Damages); and Keythe Farley (co-author, Bat Boy: The Musical).

The Texas Shakespeare Festival is listed as a Major Festival in the book Shakespeare Festivals Around the World by Marcus D. Gregio (Editor), 2004.

=== Productions ===
In more than thirty-six years, the Texas Shakespeare Festival has produced twenty-nine plays of Shakespeare's canon, as well as multiple American and European classics, original works, numerous musicals, and very successful shows for young audiences. Their work with young audience led to them being awarded a grant in 2005 to further support youth activities. The Festival continues to audition and employ professional directors, actors, designers, and technicians, as well as giving many university students from all across America their first summer theatre experience. The Festival has attracted a range of attention throughout its more than two-decades of performances. In 1999 a production of Angels in America produced by the Kilgore College Theatre Department and directed by Caldwell, led to death threats, anti-gay protests and a withdrawal of more than $50,000 in funding by the Gregg County Commissioners. Subsequently, however, the Festival received grants from both Paul Newman's Own PEN Center, the Dramatists Guild of America, and other sympathetic sources nationwide.

== Support ==
Kilgore College provides the majority of the funding for the Festival, and provides a range of other support for the festival including: rehearsal facilities, office spaces, the Van Cliburn Auditorium, dormitory housing and meals for the entire company, scholarships for the apprentices, printing, publicity and public relations. Additional grants and foundations enable the Texas Shakespeare Festival to continue as a strong and vital cultural asset and tourist attraction for all of East Texas. The Festival is also credited as bringing a degree of sophistication in the arts world to East Texas. In return, the Festival supports the college with grant funding to help refurbish the auditorium in which it performs.
