= Valerie Fox =

American business executive (born 1954)

- Born: January 8, 1954 (age 72); New York
- Education: Syracuse University; Carleton University; University of Ottawa; Algonquin College; Sheridan College; Adler Graduate Professional School
- Occupations: executive director, creative director, professional coach

Valerie Fox (born 1954) is an executive director, creative director and professional coach. She is known for her work at IBM Canada, as well as for developing and co-founding Toronto Metropolitan University's DMZ, a multidisciplinary workspace, business incubator and startup accelerator for digital media businesses. She is principally responsible for making industry and institutional connections, and for bringing partnerships and collaboration to the DMZ. She holds multiple patents, including one for the concept of the “Universal Shopping Cart” and four patents for the “Synchronized Multi-Tablet Internet/TV System.”

== Career ==
Valerie began her career at IBM Canada in 1993 where she was the National Practice Lead of User Experience Design. In 1999, she worked as the Creative Director for the Official Sydney Olympics website. In 2004, she became a Professional and Executive Coach. In 2006, after leaving IBM Canada, Valerie began her career at Toronto Metropolitan University, becoming the Director of Innovative Technology Solutions. In April 2010, she co-founded the Ryerson Digital Media Zone.

== Awards and recognition ==
Valerie received the Outstanding Achievement award for her role on the IBM Executive Design Consultancy Board, as well as an Award of Excellence for the Sydney Olympics website design. In 2012, Valerie received the prestigious Canadian Women in Technology (CanWIT) Sara Kirke Award for Entrepreneurship and Innovation, provided by the Canadian Advanced Technology Alliance (CATAAlliance).
