= Lucinda Coxon =

English playwright and screenwriter

- Born: 1962 (age 63–64); Derby, England
- Education: Somerville College, Oxford
- Occupations: Playwright and screenwriter
- Children: 1
- Writing career
- Notable work: The Danish Girl

Lucinda Coxon (born 1962) is an English playwright and screenwriter. She was born in Derby.

== Education ==
In 1981, Coxon enrolled at Somerville College, Oxford.

== Works ==
=== Plays ===
Coxon's plays include Improbabilities at Soho Poly; Waiting at the Water's Edge and Wishbones at the Bush Theatre, London; Three Graces at Lakeside Theatre, Colchester and the Haymarket Theatre, Leicester; Nostalgia at South Coast Repertory, California; The Ice Palace from the novel by Tarjei Vesaas – for the National Theatre Connections scheme. Vesuvius at South Coast Repertory, California; The Shoemaker's Incredible Wife from Federico García Lorca – also for the National Theatre Connections scheme. Her play – Happy Now? – premiered at the Cottesloe Theatre, National Theatre, London in 2008. It has since been produced for Yale Repertory Theater's 2008–2009 Season, and Primary Stages Theater's 25th Anniversary Season in 2009–2010. "The Eternal Not" was winner of the Best Script and Best Comedy Awards at the Screentest Festival 2013. A new play, Herding Cats was first seen at the Ustinov Studio, Bath in December 2010 and revived at the Hampstead Theatre, London in December 2011. Olivia Hallinan starred as Justine in both productions.

=== Screenplays ===
Screenplays include The Heart of Me, Lily and the Secret Planting, Spaghetti Slow,The Danish Girl (adapted from David Ebershoff's novel), One Life, Mrs Gonzalez, Wild Target and The Little Stranger (adapted from Sarah Waters' novel).

Coxon adapted Michel Faber's novel The Crimson Petal and the White as a miniseries on BBC, which aired in April 2011.

== Personal life ==
Coxon lives in north-west London with her husband and daughter.
