= The Mercy (soundtrack) =

The Mercy (Original Motion Picture Soundtrack)

Film score by Jóhann Jóhannsson
- Released: 2 February 2018
- Recorded: 2016–2018
- Studios: AIR Studios, London, United Kingdom; Fríkirkjan í Reykjavík, Iceland; The Greenhouse, Reykjavík, Iceland; NTOV, Reykjavík, Iceland; Studio 22, Budapest, Hungary
- Genres: Film score; orchestral
- Length: 56:36
- Label: Deutsche Grammophon
- Producer: Jóhann Jóhannsson

Jóhann Jóhannsson chronology
Arrival (2016)	The Mercy (2018)	Mary Magdalene (2018)

The Mercy (Original Motion Picture Soundtrack) is the soundtrack album to the 2017 biographical film The Mercy directed by James Marsh. The film score was composed by Jóhann Jóhannsson and released through Deutsche Grammophon on 2 February 2018. Jóhannsson won the World Soundtrack Award for Soundtrack Composer of the Year.

== Background ==
The film score is composed by Jóhann Jóhannsson in his second collaboration with Marsh after The Theory of Everything (2014) which fetched him Golden Globe Award for Best Original Score. He compared the film's setting being different in tonality, with respect to their previous collaboration; although having similarities in style, the film went it to a much darker outcome that provided "a more satisfying outcome aesthetically". Marsh felt The Mercy being an interesting collaboration as the story had them immediately in-sync with, both being quite dark and gloomy. Jóhannsson would provide musical ideas even before the film began production as he was inspired by the script. It was also one of the last films he scored before his death on 9 February 2018, the same day as the film's release in United Kingdom. Deutsche Grammophon released the soundtrack on digital platforms, a week prior, with a CD and LP versions being released later.

== Reception ==
Pete Simons of Synchrotones noted "It's not quite as melodic and polished as [The] Theory of Everything, but it's certainly more accessible and more colourful than Arrival [...] there's an elegance to this score [which] is playful at times, but in a bitter-sweet way. It's slow and minimalistic, but it's fascinating." Lillian Crawford of Varsity noted "captured a raw sense of existential dread both unsettling and profoundly moving". Paddy Kehoe of RTÉ News stated " At his best, Jóhannsson was the alchemist of a mysterious, pale beauty that will continue to entrance us."

== Track listing ==
No.	Title	Artist(s)	Length
1.	"Flares"	Jóhann Jóhannsson	1:11
2.	"Boating for Beginners"	Jóhannsson	1:34
3.	"The Good Ship Teignmouth Electron"	Jóhannsson	2:55
4.	"Jóhannsson: A Sparrow Alighted Upon Our Shoulder"	Jóhannsson; Air Lyndhurst String Orchestra; Anthony Weeden	2:26
5.	"Terra Firma"	Jóhannsson	2:38
6.	"Into the Wide and Deep Unknown"	Jóhannsson	2:16
7.	"Jóhannsson: Good Morning, Midnight"	Jóhannsson; Air Lyndhurst; Weeden	3:16
8.	"A Sea Without Shores"	Jóhannsson	1:31
9.	"Karen býr til engil" (Remastered)	Jóhannsson	3:44
10.	"Innocence" (From Free the Mind)	Jóhannsson	1:10
11.	"The Doldrums"	Jóhannsson	2:12
12.	"Meditation" (From Free the Mind)	Jóhannsson	1:29
13.	"The Horse Latitudes"	Jóhannsson	3:14
14.	"Radio" (From Free the Mind)	Jóhannsson	3:49
15.	"The Furious Sea of Fogs and Squalls"	Jóhannsson	1:13
16.	"Three Thousand Five Hundred and Ninety-One Benches" (From Copenhagen Dreams)	Jóhannsson	1:49
17.	"The Captain's Log"	Jóhannsson	1:49
18.	"The Mercy"	Jóhannsson	6:03
19.	"She Loves to Ride the Port Ferry When It Rains" (From Copenhagen Dreams)	Jóhannsson	3:03
20.	"Jóhannsson: The Radiant City"	Jóhannsson; The Dirac Quartet	3:30
21.	"Jóhannsson: A Pile of Dust"	Jóhannsson; Air Lyndhurst; Weeden	4:49
22.	"At 19°41'10.40 North 79°52'37.83 West, Lies the Shadow"	Jóhannsson	0:55
Total length:			56:36

Amongst the incidental music was "The New Colonial" march by Robert B Hall, played on the quayside during the departure scene by members of Torbay Brass Band.

== Accolades ==
Award	Date of ceremony	Category	Recipients	Result	Ref.
World Soundtrack Awards	October 17, 2018	Soundtrack Composer of the Year	Jóhann Jóhannsson (Note: also for Mary Magdalene and Mandy)	Won	
