= Sicario (soundtrack) =

Sicario (Original Motion Picture Soundtrack)

Film score by Jóhann Jóhannsson
- Released: September 18, 2015
- Genre: Film score
- Length: 53:53
- Label: Varèse Sarabande

Jóhann Jóhannsson chronology
The Theory of Everything (2014)	Sicario (2015)	Arrival (2016)

Sicario (Original Motion Picture Soundtrack) is the soundtrack accompanying the 2015 film of the same name. Featuring an original score composed by Jóhann Jóhannsson, the soundtrack was released on September 18, 2015 alongside the film, through Varèse Sarabande. The score received positive reviews from critics and eventually fetched him nominations for Academy Award for Best Original Score and BAFTA Award for Best Original Music.

== Development ==
Sicario is Jóhannsson's sophomore association with Villeneuve after previously working on Prisoners (2013). When Villeneuve handed the script to Jóhannsson, he was "struck by the sense of moral ambiguity" and the complex situations the characters face, the setting and the structure and immediately liked it, deciphering Taylor Sheridan's script as "strong, original and unique". Jóhannsson eventually visited Mexico (where the film was shot) to delve deeper into the visual representation of the script and analyze its musical sensibilities.

The first edit of the film did not feature temp tracks which was sent to Jóhannsson for scoring. Both Jóhannsson and Villeneuve discussed about the sonic palette they intended to derive with the latter's strong sense and demands to what he wanted and gave him freedom in terms of how to implement that. He eventually wrote five cues to the rough cut and sent to Villeneuve who liked it and eventually suggested Jóhannsson to expand the themes more briefly which helped them to find the sound and voice. As both Jóhannsson and Villeneuve shared a good rapport in the past, the latter responded to several ideas of the former and helped him ways to implement those themes, forming an intuitive collaboration.

Being an intense film, Jóhannsson eventually used percussion and other rhythmic elements from the onset. But exploring the dark past of the characters, it served him as the inspiration for the melancholic moments in the score. He did not use any vocoders or voice synthesizers, which he would use in the past, but used choral elements from singer Robert Aiki Aubrey Lowe sporadically as the music palette would be primarily based on percussions and orchestral elements which were recorded in an unconventional manner. Jóhannsson would record the orchestra live and edited and manipulated those cues for the score. Cellist Hildur Guðnadóttir and bassist-guitarist Skúli Sverrisson worked as soloists, performing cello and six-string bass, respectively. Sound designer B. J. Nilsen would record the processed electronic sounds without using synthesizers. The score was recorded for more than a year, during the production press in its entirety.

== Critical response ==
Sicario's score received acclaim from critics. It has been listed as one among the best scores of the year and decade, by Collider, Den of Geek, Film School Rejects. Following Jóhannsson's death in February 2018, Sicario has been regarded as one of the composer's best works.

Pete Simons of Synchrotones, in his five-star review, called it as "one of the darkest, bad-assest scores I've ever heard – and it is utterly fantastic for it". Ryan Hall of SLUG Magazine wrote, "Listening to the soundtrack sans visuals is just as white-knuckle gripping." Marcy Donelson of AllMusic summarised that Jóhannsson's score "delivers tension and off-kilter anxiety in both hushed and hyper musical moments". Keith Bruce of The Herald described it as "fine contemporary minimalism".

Ed Gonzalez of Slant Magazine wrote, "Jóhann Jóhannsson's score is just one of many elements that conjure a relentlessly terrifying realm of despair." A. O. Scott of The New York Times described it as a "slow-moving heart attack". Scott Foundas of Variety called it "subtly menacing". Guy Lodge from Time Out wrote, "Johann Johannsson's score swarms with malevolent foreboding". Jessica Kiang of IndieWire called it as "spectacular". Richard Lawson of Vanity Fair described it as "rumbling" and "evocative". Dana Stevens of Slate indicated that Jóhannsson's electronic soundtrack "delivers a series of jolting sonic booms". Mark Olsen of Los Angeles Times wrote, "The film's score by Jóhann Jóhannsson creates a throbbing, underlying tightness throughout."

Mark Kermode of The Guardian wrote, "Jóhann Jóhannsson's score is all ominous rumbles and low growling honks [...] By comparison, Hans Zimmer's work on Inception sounds upbeat."

== Track listing ==
No.	Title	Length
1.	"Armoured Vehicle"	1:39
2.	"The Beast"	3:14
3.	"The Border"	2:56
4.	"Drywall"	2:32
5.	"Explosion"	1:07
6.	"Desert Music"	5:06
7.	"Target"	2:01
8.	"Convoy"	2:55
9.	"The Bank"	2:03
10.	"Surveillance"	1:29
11.	"Reflection"	1:56
12.	"Melancholia"	4:35
13.	"Night Vision"	3:44
14.	"Tunnel Music"	4:39
15.	"Fausto"	2:16
16.	"Balcony"	1:35
17.	"Soccer Game"	4:19
18.	"Alejandro's Song"	5:47
Total length:		53:53

== Awards and nominations ==
Award	Category	Recipient	Result	Ref(s)
Academy Awards	Best Original Score	Jóhann Jóhannsson	Nominated	
British Academy Film Awards	Best Original Music	Jóhann Jóhannsson	Nominated	
Critics' Choice Awards	Best Score	Jóhann Jóhannsson	Nominated	
Empire Awards	Best Soundtrack	Sicario	Nominated	
San Diego Film Critics Society	Best Use of Music in a Film	Sicario	Nominated	
Saturn Awards	Best Music	Jóhann Jóhannsson	Nominated	
Washington D.C. Area Film Critics Association	Best Original Score	Jóhann Jóhannsson	Won	
World Soundtrack Awards	Soundtrack Composer of the Year	Jóhann Jóhannsson	Nominated	
