= Mary Magdalene (soundtrack) =

Mary Magdalene (Original Motion Picture Soundtrack)

Film score by Jóhann Jóhannsson and Hildur Guðnadóttir
- Released: March 30, 2018
- Studio: AIR Studios, London
- Genre: Film score
- Length: 39:57
- Label: Milan
- Producer: Jóhann Jóhannsson; Hildur Guðnadóttir

Jóhann Jóhannsson chronology
The Mercy (2017)	Mary Magdalene (2018)	Mandy (2018)

Hildur Guðnadóttir chronology
Journey's End (2017)	Mary Magdalene (2018)	Sicario: Day of the Soldado (2018)

Mary Magdalene (Original Motion Picture Soundtrack) is the film score to the 2018 biblical drama film Mary Magdalene directed by Garth Davis. Composed jointly by Jóhann Jóhannsson and Hildur Guðnadóttir, the film score was released through Milan Records on March 30, 2018. It was also one of Jóhannsson's final film scores released posthumously after his death in February 2018.

== Background ==
Jóhann Jóhannsson composed the score for Mary Magdalene in collaboration with cellist Hildur Guðnadóttir, whom she shared a professional working relationship, having collaborated on several studio albums and films with the former: Prisoners (2013) and Sicario (2015). The duo began writing the score during late 2017 and had planned to record in October. However, the eventual recording happened during January 2018. They brainstormed on finding several things on expressing and writing the music, which led to a prolonged conversation. According to Davis, Guðnadóttir's involvement helped in capturing Mary's voice, where "she understood her journey and found both its truth and beauty at the same time" while Jóhannsson brought the otherworldly qualities, and "As we got closer to truth and closer to God, I wanted the music to feel like we were going into space and taking us into another realm." Jóhannsson and Guðnadóttir recorded at the AIR Studios in London.

The film was dedicated to Jóhannsson, who died on 9 February 2018, prior to the release, making this as one of his last film scores alongside Mandy. Milan Records released the soundtrack on 30 March 2018.

== Reception ==
Pete Simons of Synchrotones stated "despite its relative simplicity [the album] is incredibly powerful and full of hope." Anže Grčar of Movie Music UK noted "[Mary Magdalene] is somehow both a tender farewell letter to Jóhannsson and a welcoming embrace to Guðnadóttir, containing that lively spark of substance that made Jóhannsson into what he is today and what is about to propel Guðnadóttir into a long overdue mainstream spotlight." Justin Chang of Los Angeles Times called it as "an intensely lush and stirring score". Stephen Dalton of The Hollywood Reporter summarized "Striking a poignant note, quite literally, the film's haunting electro-orchestral score marks the final screen credit for composer Johan Johansson, who died this month, here working in tandem with fellow Icelander Hildur Gudnadottir." Guy Lodge of Variety wrote "the swelling, swooning strings of Hildur Guðnadóttir and Jóhann Jóhannsson's unreservedly vast score [...] heightens the hair-tingling effect of it all."

Mike McCahill of IndieWire described it as a "typically searching final score" that aids the film. Fionnuala Halligan of Screen International wrote "Music by Hildur Gudnadóttir and Jóhann Jóhannsson – who passed away recently – leans on the Psalms and heavenly strings and can weigh quite heavily on the film, tipping it over into Enya territory." Barry Hertz of The Globe and Mail wrote "Johann Johannsson's comically overbearing score is just interesting enough to justify the entire project".

== Track listing (Note: The track "Good Night, Day" from Johannsson's separate album Orphée is used when Mary and Peter feed famished survivors. It is not listed here.) ==
No.	Title	Length
1.	"Cana"	1:39
2.	"The Mustard Seed"	2:11
3.	"The Dress"	1:31
4.	"Messiah"	3:36
5.	"The Goats"	5:07
6.	"Ravine"	2:01
7.	"Leaving Home"	4:58
8.	"Rooftop"	2:07
9.	"Golgotha"	2:56
10.	"Crucifixion"	3:12
11.	"End of a Journey"	2:49
12.	"Maundy"	3:19
13.	"Resurrection"	4:31
Total length:		39:57

== Personnel ==
Credits adapted from liner notes

- Music – Hildur Guðnadóttir, Jóhann Jóhannsson
- Programming – Gunnar Örn Tynes, Kjartan Holm, Sam Slater, Þórarinn Gudnason
- Recording and mixing engineer – Geoff Foster
- Additional recording engineer – Francesco Donadello
- Assistant recording engineer – Adam Miller, Alex Ferguson, Fiona Cruickshank, Laurence Anslow
- Music consultant – David Tibet
- Executive producer – JC Chamboredon, Stefan Karrer
- Copyist – Colin Rae
- Design and layout – Shawn Lyon

Orchestra

- Orchestrators – Viktor Orri Árnason, Clarissa Farran, Thomas Eggensberger
- Conductor – Viktor Orri Árnason
- Leader – Jonathan Morton
- Music contractor and coordinator – Hilary Skewes
- Guitar – Þórarinn Gudnason
- Halldorophone – Hildur Guðnadóttir
- Percussion – Hildur Guðnadóttir, Rob Lowe, Rutger Hoedemaekers, Sam Slater, Samuli Kosminen, Wouter Rentema
- Piano – Brian Crosby, Viktor Orri Árnason
- Saxophone – Colin Stetson
- Viola, Violin – Viktor Orri Árnason

Choir

- Vocals – Theatre of Voices
- Alto – Laura Lamph
- Baritone – Jakob Bloch Jespersen
- Soprano – Else Torp
- Tenor – Paul Bentley-Angell
- Additional vocals – Hildur Guðnadóttir
- Vocal conductor – Paul Hilliard

== Accolades ==
Award	Date	Category	Recipients	Result	Ref.
AACTA Awards	December 3, 2018	Best Original Music Score	Hildur Guðnadóttir, Jóhann Jóhannsson	Nominated	
Asia Pacific Screen Awards	November 29, 2018	Best Original Score	Hildur Guðnadóttir, Jóhann Jóhannsson	Won	
World Soundtrack Awards	October 17, 2018	Soundtrack Composer of the Year	Jóhann Jóhannsson (Note: also for The Mercy and Mandy)	Won	
