= Prisoners (soundtrack) =

Prisoners (Original Motion Picture Soundtrack)

Film score by Jóhann Jóhannsson
- Released: September 16, 2013
- Recorded: 2013
- Studio: AIR; Remote Control Productions; Black Saloon
- Genre: Film score
- Length: 55:22
- Label: WaterTower; ASG
- Producer: Jóhann Jóhannsson

Jóhann Jóhannsson chronology
Copenhagen Dreams (2012)	Prisoners (2013)	McCanick (2014)

Prisoners (Original Motion Picture Soundtrack) is the soundtrack album to the 2013 film Prisoners directed by Denis Villeneuve and featured a musical score composed by Jóhann Jóhannsson. The album was released through WaterTower Music and ASG Records on September 16, 2013.

== Development ==
In April 2013, a contributor from Film Music Reporter announced that Icelandic composer Jóhann Jóhannsson would compose music for Prisoners. Villeneuve contacted Jóhannsson via his agent after he listened to some of his scores and offered the film before it began production. He then wrote a couple of pieces much earlier that was used in the final edit, so that there was almost no temp music used. Jóhannsson settled on three themes—"The Keeper", "I Can't Find Them" and "Through Falling Snow"—which served as the basis of the score. He visited the sets of the film in Atlanta, to have a clear idea of the film's atmosphere and get the sense of the locations. He eventually listened to most of the church music, old Icelandic hymns and Renaissance-sacred music and integrated them into the themes. Calling "The Lord’s Prayer" as the difficult piece, despite being the simple theme, he recalled that he went to a small island with about 20 inhabitants in the North Iceland to isolate himself and rewrote the theme 15 times, until the final version was zeroed on.

According to Jóhannsson, the role of the film's music was not only to create tension, but also to create "a kind of poetic and lyrical counterpoint to the horror of the events depicted in the film". He added that, "while the action is terrifying and horrific, the music has this beauty and fragility and lyricism which, in a strange way, amplifies the effect the film has on you."

Jóhannsson recorded a session with experimental musician Erik Knife Skodvin in Berlin during the recording session and generated a lot of drones and soundscapes which he used in the writing process. Skodovin's recording of unsettling layers in the soundscape, was curated and layered with the drones and soundscapes. Jóhannsson did not want a pipe organ, in favor of an ethereal instrument without any religious association that a pipe organ has, hence, he layered the Cristal Baschet and Ondes Martenot to curate "floating, dream-like sound". Thomas Bloch played the specific instrument and cellist Hildur Guðnadóttir (who would later become a film composer) also worked on the film score.

Prisoners marked the maiden association with Jóhannsson and Villeneuve who would later collaborate on Sicario (2015) and Arrival (2016). He was initially announced as the composer for Blade Runner 2049 (2017), but in order to curate a score which was closer to Vangelis' soundtrack for Blade Runner (1982), Villenueve decided to end his collaboration with Jóhannsson and eventually roped in Hans Zimmer and Benjamin Wallfisch to score the film.

== Release ==
=== Critical reception ===
Scott Foundas of Variety wrote that the "[s]core by Icelandic composer Jóhann Jóhannsson (also making his big-studio debut) strikes just the right haunting, mournful notes." Kate Erbland of Film School Rejects mentioned Jóhannsson's score as one of the positives.

=== Year-end lists ===
- 5th – The Playlist Staff, IndieWire
- 6th – Bobby Finger, The Atlantic
- 15th – Melissa Thompson and Michelle McCue, We Are Movie Geeks

== Track listing ==
Prisoners (Original Motion Picture Soundtrack) track listing
No.	Title	Length
1.	"The Lord's Prayer"	2:31
2.	"I Can't Find Them"	4:09
3.	"The Search Party"	2:54
4.	"Surveillance Video"	3:34
5.	"The Candlelight Vigil"	5:10
6.	"Escape"	5:44
7.	"The Tall Man"	2:47
8.	"The Everyday Bible"	2:23
9.	"Following Keller"	2:11
10.	"Through Falling Snow"	2:44
11.	"The Keeper"	2:49
12.	"The Intruder"	3:11
13.	"The Priest's Basement"	2:48
14.	"The Snakes"	2:51
15.	"The Trans Am"	2:37
16.	"Prisoners"	6:59
Total length:		55:00

== Personnel ==
Credits adapted from liner notes.

- Music composer and producer – Jóhann Jóhannsson
- Recording – Geoff Foster
- Mixing – Daniel Kresco
- Mastering – Mandy Parnell
- Score editor – Joseph S. Debeasi
- Music supervision – Deva Anderson
- Executive producer – Adam Kolbrenner, Andrew Kosove, Broderick Johnson, Denis Villeneuve, Ed McDonnell, Kira Davis

Orchestra

- Orchestration – Dana Niv, Rossano Galante
- Orchestra conductor – Ben Foster
- Orchestra contractor – Isobel Griffiths
- Assistant contractor – Lucy Whalley
- Music librarian – Dave Foster

Instruments

- Cello – Caroline Dale, Hildur Guðnadóttir, Erik Skodvin
- Double bass – Erik Skodvin
- Guitar and electronics – Jóhann Jóhannsson, Erik Skodvin
- Ondes Martenot – Thomas Bloch
- Percussion and organ – Jóhann Jóhannsson
- Violin – Thomas Bowes

== Accolades ==
Accolades for Prisoners (Original Motion Picture Soundtrack)
Award	Date of ceremony	Category	Recipient(s)	Result	Ref(s)
World Soundtrack Awards	August 14, 2014	Public Choice Award	Jóhann Jóhannsson	Nominated	
