= Virðulegu Forsetar =

Virðulegu forsetar

Studio album by Jóhann Jóhannsson
- Released: 3 October 2004
- Genre: Minimalist, classical music, ambient
- Length: 65:34
- Label: Touch Music
- Producer: Jóhann Jóhannsson

Jóhann Jóhannsson chronology
Dís (2004)	Virðulegu forsetar (2004)	IBM 1401, A User's Manual (2006)

Professional ratings
Review scores
Source	Rating
Allmusic	2.5/5 stars
Pitchfork Media	8.8/10

Virðulegu forsetar (Icelandic for Honorable presidents) is the second studio album by Icelandic musician Jóhann Jóhannsson, released by Touch Music in 2004. It consists of one ambient-influenced classical piece using the same phrase throughout, divided into four parts for technical reasons.

== Performance at remembrance concert ==
After Jóhannsson's death in 2018, Adam Wiltzie, a close friend, organised a remembrance performance of Virðulegu forsetar on what would have been Jóhannsson's 49th birthday. The concert took place at the Church of Saint John The Baptist at the Béguinage in Brussels.

== Track listing ==
All tracks are written by Jóhann Jóhannsson.

No.	Title	Length
1.	"Part 1"	14:41
2.	"Part 2"	14:51
3.	"Part 3"	14:14
4.	"Part 4"	21:45

== Personnel ==
- Bass, Electronics – Skúli Sverrisson
- Conductor – Guðni Franzson
- Ensemble – The Caput Ensemble
- Glockenspiel, bells, electronics – Mathias M.D. Hemstock
- Horns – Anna Sigurbjörnsdóttir, Einar St. Jónsson, Emil Friðfinnsson, Stefán Jón Bernharðsson, Þorkell Jóelsson
- Organ – Guðmundur Sigurðsson, Hörður Bragason
- Photography – Jon Wozencroft, Kari Ósk Ege
- Recording, mastering, authoring – Sveinn Kjartansson
- Trumpet – Eiríkur Örn Pálsson, Ásgeir Steingrímsson*
- Tuba – Sigurður Már Valsson
- Writing, arranging, production, piano, electronics – Jóhann Jóhannsson
