= Fordlândia =

District in Aveiro, Pará, Brazil

- District
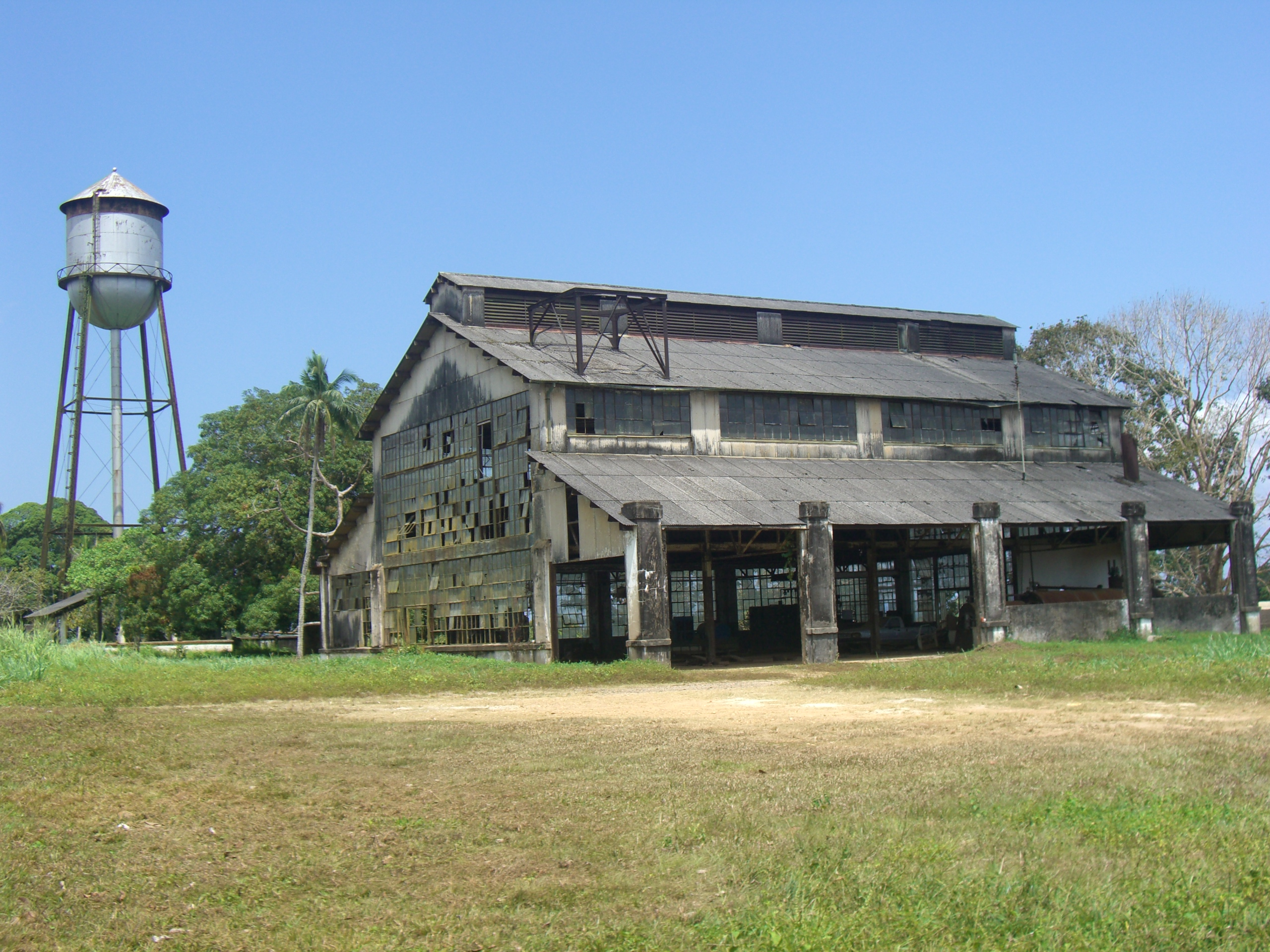
- The Fordlândia water tower (left) and the ruins of Ford's rubber plantation (right)
- Etymology: Namesake of American industrialist Henry Ford
- Interactive map of Fordlândia
- Location in Pará Fordlândia (Brazil)
- Coordinates: 3°49′53″S 55°29′51″W
- Country: Brazil
- State: Pará
- City: Aveiro
- Founded: 1928

Population (2017)
  - Total: About 3,000

Fordlândia (Note: Brazilian Portuguese pronunciation: [ˌfɔʁdʒiˈlɐ̃dʒjɐ], lit. 'Ford-land'. Typically rendered in English without the circumflex accent.) is a district and adjacent area of 14,268 square kilometres (5,509 sq mi) in the city of Aveiro, Pará, Brazil. It is located on the east banks of the Tapajós river roughly 300 kilometres (190 mi) south of the city of Santarém.

It was established by American industrialist Henry Ford in the Amazon rainforest in 1928 as a prefabricated industrial town intended to be inhabited by 10,000 people to secure a source of cultivated rubber for the automobile manufacturing operations of the Ford Motor Company in the United States. Ford had negotiated a deal with the Brazilian government granting him a concession of 10,000 km^{2} (3,900 sq mi) of land on the banks of the Rio Tapajós near the city of Santarém, Pará, Brazil, in exchange for a 9% share in the profits generated. Ford's project failed, and the city was abandoned in 1934.

The town was mostly deserted, with only 90 residents still living in the city until the early 2000s when it saw an increase of population, being home to around 3,000 people as of 2017.

== History ==
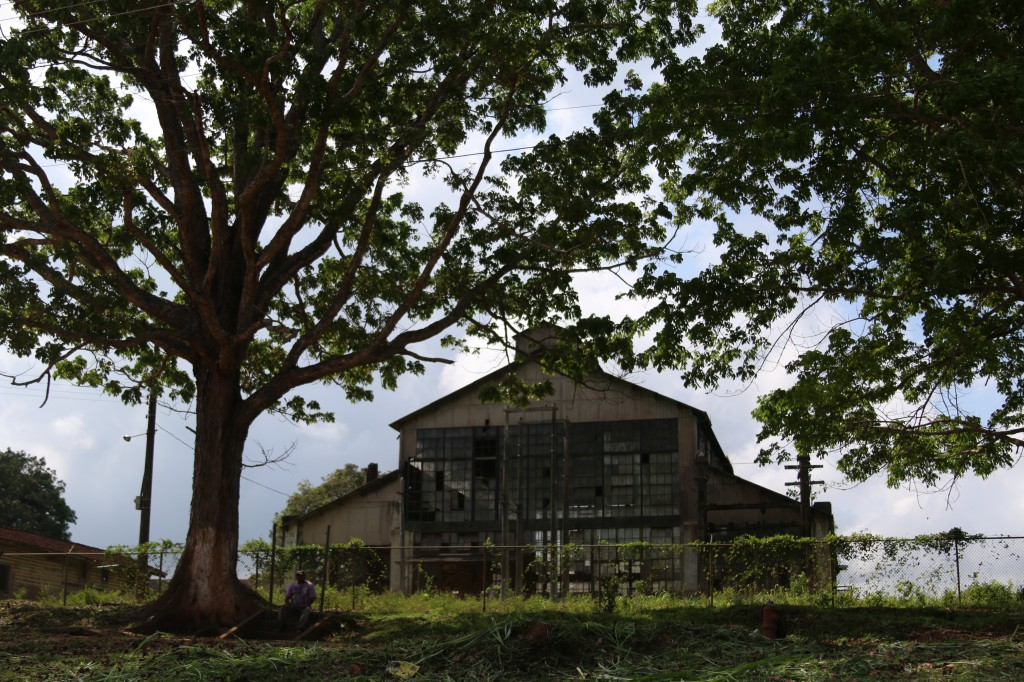
The main warehouse at Fordlândia

=== Ford Motor Company Plantation ===
In 1927, the Ford Motor Company announced interest in buying the land in Brazil which now forms Fordlândia to create a rubber plantation. This was done to reduce Ford's reliance on European rubber manufacturing, particularly after Winston Churchill proposed the creation of a "rubber cartel." Ford had utopian visions for this plantation, drawing up plans to create a Midwest-style town around the plantation.

Negotiations with the Brazilian government started during the visit by then-governor of the State of Pará, Dionísio Bentes, to the United States to meet Ford. An agreement was signed and the American industrialist received an area of about 2.5 million acres (10,100 km^{2}) called "Boa Vista". The agreement exempted Ford from taxes on the exportation of goods produced in Brazil in exchange for 9% of the profits, 7% going to the Brazilian government and 2% of profits to local municipalities.

Seeking workers, several offices were opened in the cities of Belém and Manaus, and, with the promise of good wages, people of the nearby states answered.

==== Decline ====
The site was developed as a planned community with different areas of the city being designated for the Brazilian workers and the American managers, who lived in the so-called American Village. Significant infrastructure was built, including American-style houses, a hospital and a school. As part of the utopia, a swimming pool, golf course, tennis courts, and a movie theater were also constructed.

Ford's utopian vision included a strict set of rules imposed by the managers. Alcohol, tobacco and prostitution were forbidden within the town, including inside the workers' own homes. American managers would go from house to house to enforce these rules. Workers circumvented these prohibitions by paddling out to merchant riverboats moored beyond the town jurisdiction, often hiding contraband goods inside fruits like watermelons. A small settlement was established 8 kilometres (5 mi) upstream on the "Island of Innocence" with bars, nightclubs and brothels.

The land was hilly, rocky and infertile. None of Ford's managers had the requisite knowledge of tropical agriculture. In the wild, the rubber trees grow apart from each other as a protection mechanism against plagues and diseases, often growing close to bigger trees of other species for added support. In Fordlândia, however, the trees were planted close together in plantations, easy prey for tree blight, Saúva ants, lace bugs, red spiders, and leaf caterpillars. This same lack of expertise caused disease and unrest to spread throughout the camp.

Greg Grandin's book, The Rise and Fall of Henry Ford's Forgotten Jungle City, explains "Ford had very particular understandings about what a proper diet should be … He tried to impose brown rice and whole-wheat bread and canned peaches and oatmeal — and that itself created discontent". The unfamiliar food, American-style housing, and other limitations caused friction with the local workers. Workers were treated inhumanely, being required to work through the middle of the day under the tropical sun. They often refused to work out of concern that they would succumb to the heat and humidity of the Amazon Rainforest.

==== Revolts ====
In 1930, the native workers grew tired of Ford's imposed diet in addition to a change with how the food was distributed and revolted in the town's cafeteria. This became known as the Breaking Pans (Portuguese: Quebra-Panelas). The rebels proceeded to cut the telegraph wires and chased away the managers and even the town's cook into the jungle for a few days until the Brazilian Army arrived and the revolt ended. Agreements were then made on the type of food the workers would be served.

==== Failure ====
The government of Brazil was suspicious of any foreign investments, particularly in the northern Amazonian region, and offered little help. It was not long before the numerous problems began to take a toll on the project and the decision was made to relocate. Fordlândia was abandoned by the Ford Motor Company in 1934, and the project was relocated upriver to Belterra, 40 kilometres (25 mi) south of the city of Santarém, where better conditions to grow rubber existed. By 1945, synthetic rubber had been developed, reducing world demand for natural rubber. Ford's investment opportunity dried up overnight without producing any rubber for Ford's tires, and the second town was also abandoned. In 1945, Henry Ford's grandson Henry Ford II sold the area comprising both towns back to the Brazilian government for a loss of over US$20 million (equivalent to $358 million in 2025).

In spite of the huge investment and numerous invitations, Henry Ford never visited either of his ill-fated towns. A 2009 NPR article reported, "Not one drop of latex from Fordlândia ever made it into a Ford car".

=== Ministry of Agriculture ===
Between the 1950s and late 1970s, after being given back the rights to the lands, the Brazilian government, through its Ministry of Agriculture, installed several facilities in the area. The houses that once belonged to Ford's rubber tappers were then given to the families of the Ministry's employees, whose descendants still occupy them.

This project was also short-lived and left the city nearly completely abandoned upon reaching its end.

=== Rebirth ===
The town remained inhabited by roughly 90 people until the latter half of the 2000s. No basic services were offered in the area, with medical help only coming by boat at long intervals. That changed when people looking for places to live decided to go back into the town, often claiming houses. The town, now a district of Aveiro, was home to nearly 3,000 people as of 2017.

== Facilities ==
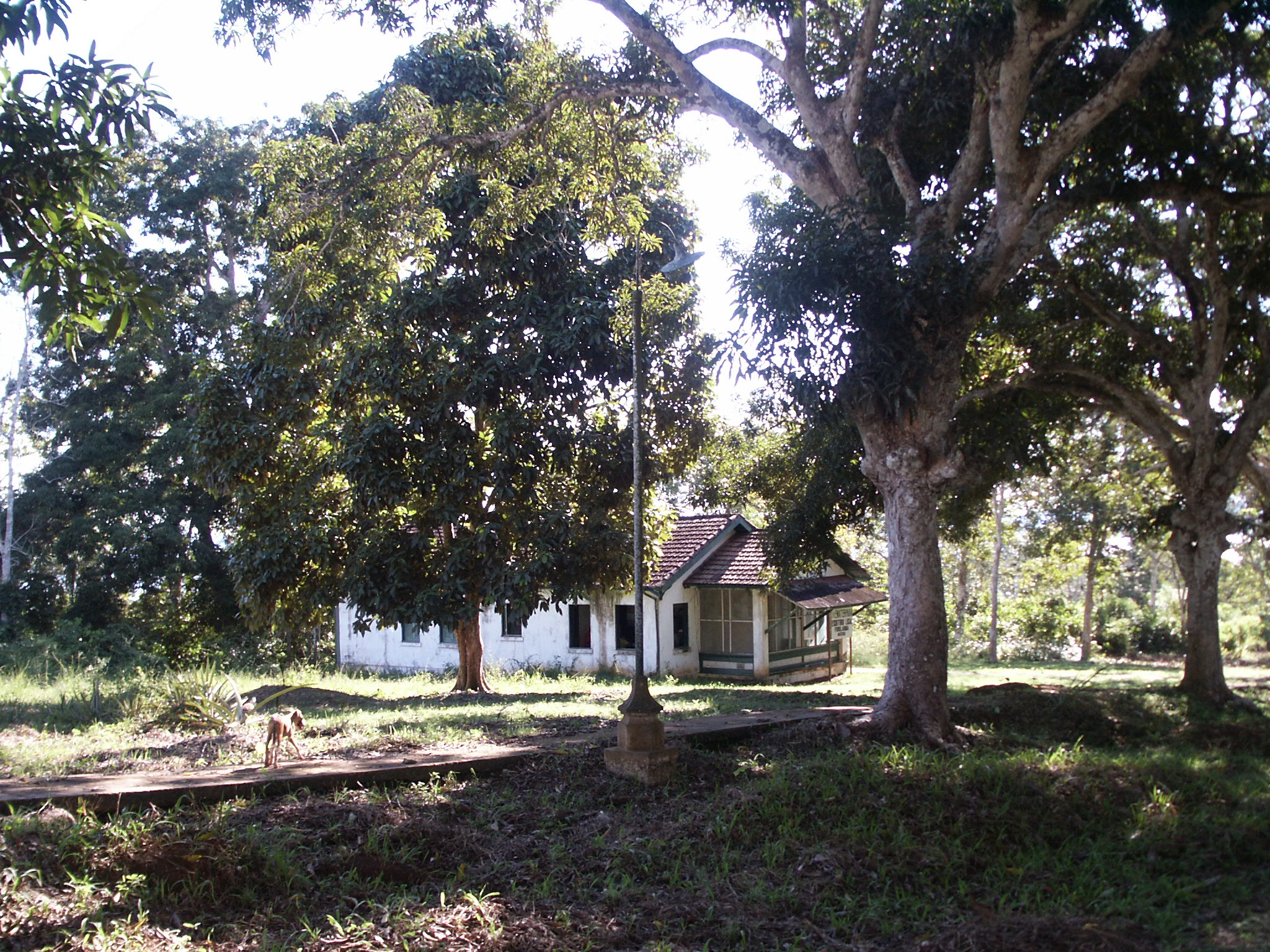
Ruins of Fordlândia, circa 2005

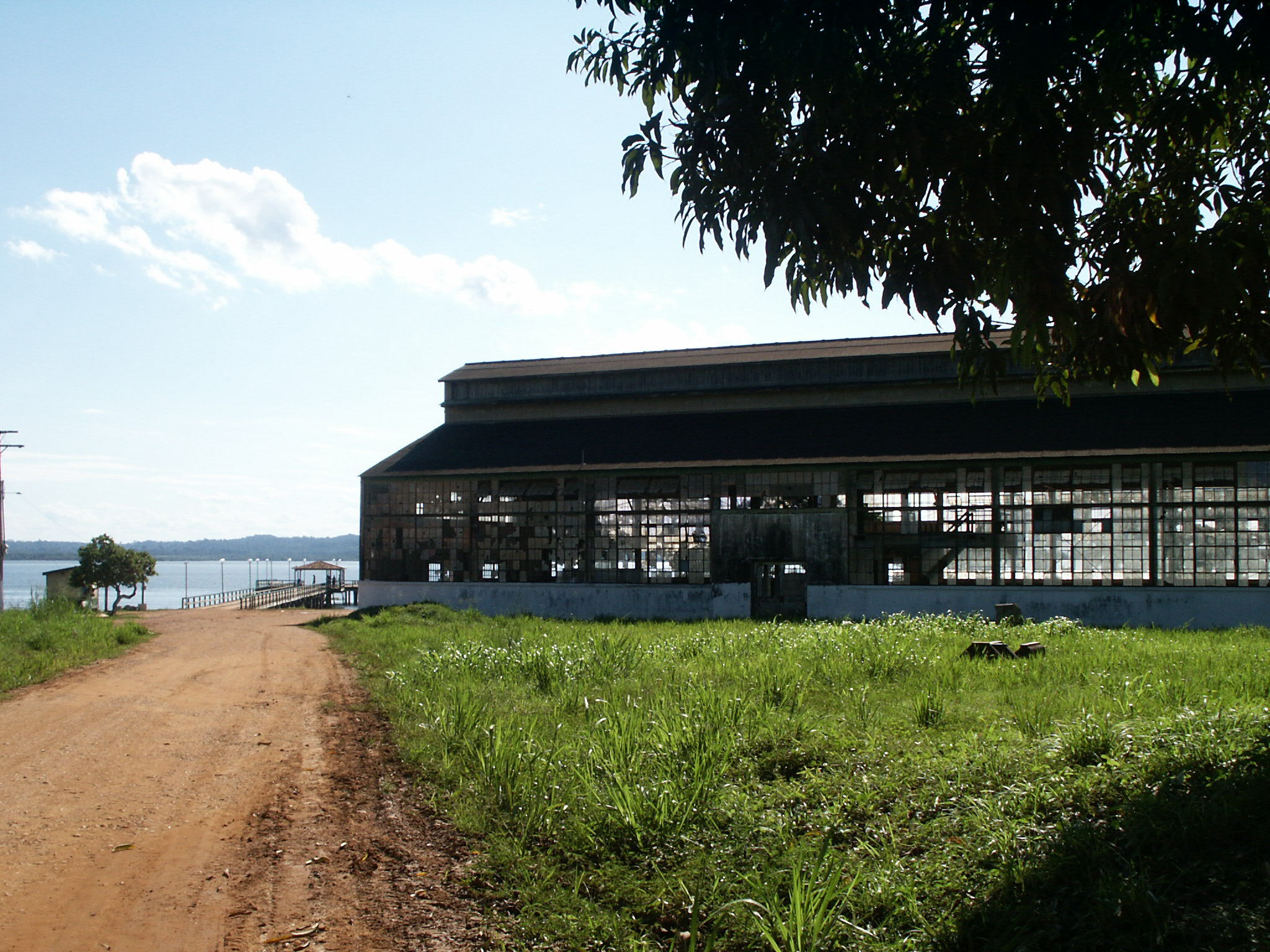
Ruins of Fordlândia, circa 2005

Most of the original buildings still stand, with the exception of the hospital, which was dismantled by looters.

=== Water tower ===
Regarded as the symbol of Fordlândia, the 50-metre (160 ft) tall water tower is located by the main warehouses. As with most of the equipment in the town, it was built in Michigan and brought to Fordlândia by merchant ship. The water tower, water treatment plant and all of its original plumbing are still operational.

=== Hospital ===
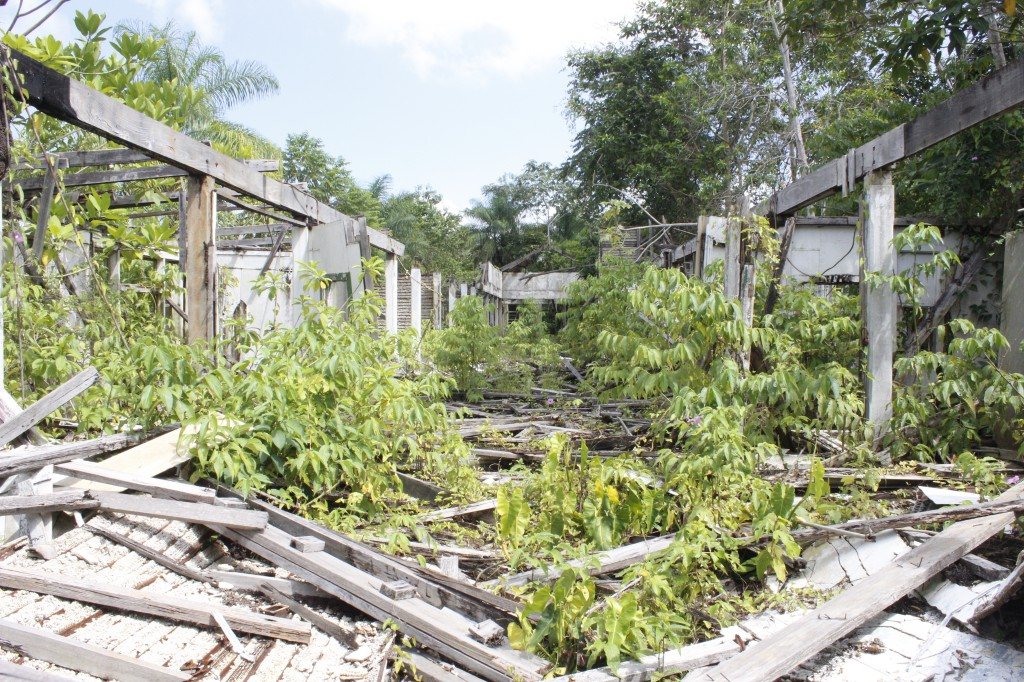
Fordlândia Hospital completely dismantled after looters removed all of its contents

The hospital was left intact until the late 2000s, when looters completely dismantled the hospital and removed its contents.

Before being dismantled, a number of controversies occurred regarding the hospital's X-ray machines. As a local TV station reported, several marked boxes containing radioactive material were left behind. This generated fears of contamination among the population of nearby towns and cities, with people often mentioning the Goiânia accident, causing the authorities to remove the materials following an outcry.

=== Sawmill ===
The town had a sawmill responsible for providing lumber for all the construction around. The sawmill and kiln still stand; however, most equipment is gone.

=== Workshop ===
The town's workshop was a three-story warehouse responsible for manufacturing parts for the machines working in the town. It still stands and has most of the original equipment. It is now used as a warehouse where most artifacts from Ford's era are kept. Hospital beds, equipment, a lead coffin and parts of an X-ray machine are stored in this warehouse.

The second floor of the warehouse was allowed to be used for the processing of seeds for a community project. The oil extracted from those seeds greatly accelerated the rotting of the wooden floor which has collapsed in some areas.

=== American Village ===
The six houses in the American Village still had their original furniture, silverware and even clothes that were left behind when the town was deserted. The houses were claimed by locals and most items were sold or taken as souvenirs. One of the houses was lost to a fire.

== In nonfiction and documentary works ==
In 2009, Greg Grandin published his non-fiction account Fordlandia: The Rise and Fall of Henry Ford's Forgotten Jungle City, and Montreal artist Scott Chandler produced photos.

British actor and comedian Michael Palin's 4-part TV travel documentary Brazil with Michael Palin featured this as a location in episode 2, shown on BBC1 on 31 October 2012.

Marcos Colón's 2017 Beyond Fordlândia explores the area and portrays local people's attempt to recover the land.

The location appears in episode 4 of 5-part series Modern Ruins, made by German production company Gebrüder Beetz.

Susana de Sousa Dias's 2019 documentary Fordlandia Malaise concerns the project.

== Influence on culture ==
- The future London shown in Brave New World by Aldous Huxley was inspired by the concept of Fordlândia.
- The sixth installment of the Franco-Belgian comic series Marsupilami by Yann and Batem, published in 1991, is titled "Fordlandia" and takes place there.
- Singer/songwriter Kate Campbell's track "Fordlândia" appears on her 2008 album Save the Day.
- Argentinian writer Eduardo Sguiglia wrote a novel entitled Fordlandia.
- In November 2008, Icelandic composer Jóhann Jóhannsson released the album Fordlandia.
- British artist Dan Dubowitz photographed Fordlândia in 2012.
- In the PC game The Amazon Trail, the player travels back in time to meet Henry Ford there.

== See also ==
- Akon City – Planned community and city in Senegal
- Bitcoin City – Planned smart city project in El Salvador
- Próspera – Charter city in Bay Islands, Honduras
- Asgardia – Digital nation in an Earth orbit satellite
- Neom – Planned city in Tabuk, Saudi Arabia
- Telosa – Planned city megaproject in the United States
- Arcosanti – Experimental town in Yavapai County, Arizona
- Epcot – Theme park at Walt Disney World
- Starbase – City in Texas, United States
- Firestone Natural Rubber Company – American rubber company

== Bibliography ==
- Braudeau, Michel (2004). "Henry Ford vaincu par la « rouille »". Le rêve amazonien [Henry Ford defeated by 'rust'] (in French). éditions Gallimard. ISBN 2-07-077049-4.
- Colón, Marcos (April 2018). "Slow Seeing and the Environment: Connections and Meanings in Beyond Fordlândia". Sustainability in Debate. 9 (1). Brasília: 136–144. doi:10.18472/SustDeb.v9n1.2018.29861. ISSN 2179-9067.
- Colón, Marcos (2018). Beyond Fordlândia: An Environmental Account of Henry Ford's Adventures in the Amazon. Amazônia Latitude Films.
- Grandin, Greg (2009). Fordlandia: The Rise and Fall of Henry Ford's Forgotten Jungle City. Metropolitan Books. ISBN 978-0805082364.
