= Unun =

Unun can refer to:

- Unun (transformer) - transfers signal from one unbalanced line to another.
- Unun (band)
- unun- - prefix for elements from number 110, that has not yet got a proper name.
