= The Theory of Everything (soundtrack) =

The Theory of Everything (Original Motion Picture Soundtrack)

Film score by Jóhann Jóhannsson
- Released: 4 November 2014
- Recorded: January–May 2014
- Studio: Abbey Road Studios; AIR Studios
- Genre: Film score
- Length: 48:58
- Label: Back Lot Music
- Producer: Jóhann Jóhannsson

Jóhann Jóhannsson chronology
Blind Massage (2014)	The Theory of Everything (2014)	Sicario (2015)

The Theory of Everything (Original Motion Picture Soundtrack) is the score album composed by Icelandic composer Jóhann Jóhannsson to the 2014 film of the same name released on 4 November 2014 by Back Lot Music. The score relies on neo-classical themes more than "the decades' respective earmark sounds of the British invasion", punk music and synthpop, while including "[Jóhannsson's] signature blend of acoustic instruments and electronics". The music was acclaimed by critics, and won the Golden Globe Award for Best Original Score, alongside receiving nominations Academy Award for Best Original Score, a BAFTA Award for Best Film Music, a Critics' Choice Movie Award for Best Score and a Grammy Award for Best Score Soundtrack for Visual Media.

== Development ==
Jóhann Jóhannsson scored music for The Theory of Everything, as he and the director James Marsh lived in Copenhagen and was a music consultant in his documentary Project Nim (2011). According to Jóhannsson, "the music had to be timeless. Time is a huge motif in the film, which is colorful, and the music had to reflect that." As such, he relied on piano as the chief instrument (played primarily by Tom Poster) to express the emotions of Hawking and Jane as "it is a very expressive instrument, but it is precise. It has a mathematical-like quality, which reflects the core of the film." The score further had few electronic instruments that are confined to few cues, but primarily relies on orchestra and electronic music. He usually tend to combine orchestral music with electronics for other films, and process it a lot to create a more intricate sound. Whereas, for The Theory of Everything, the score is "much more of a pure orchestral expression". Even in the few cues, the electronics were purely acoustic sounds that are processed and not real electronic music, and he did not use synthesisers for the score.

He did not create demos for the film score, though he had detailed demos playing for the film, while the orchestration happen at the same time. The score was recorded at Abbey Road Studios with a 65-piece orchestra from the Hollywood Studio Symphony performing. The pianos were, however recorded at Air Studios due to scheduling conflicts as Abbey was not available for the piano session. The scoring began in late-January 2014 and concluded during that May 2014 in a three month process, while Jóhannsson also scored for the Chinese film Blind Massage. The cues were named after the titles and phrases from Hawking's novels. Jóhannsson commented that "it always involves the layers of live recordings, whether it's orchestra or a band or solo instrument, with electronics and more 'soundscapey' elements which can come from various sources".

Jóhannsson played some piano in the score, where in the opening cue titled "Cambridge 1963" has a four-note ostinato echoed vibrantly by the orchestral music, depicting Hawking's lively college spirit; he described it as "a kinetic, energetic track which becomes the building block of the score". He initially attempted for a lecture scene and scored a demo which did not work out. The cue he developed for that particular scene, including the ostinato and harmonies, were overlaid into subsequent cues that are developed throughout the film. Especially, the aforementioned scene which comes in the climax was a "more philosophical, more serene, thoughtful version of the opening theme".

To portray the trying relationship between the Hawkings after the physicist's deteriorating health due to motor neuron disease, a three-quarter-time piece waltz music was used in the cue "Domestic Pressures". It was a challenging scene, according to Jóhannsson, where "It starts very joyfully and comedically, goes through this idyllic stage, and then ends where it sort of curdles and becomes quite sour and a little bit bitter. It was quite tough to navigate that whole sequence and write a piece that again had a melodic and thematic unity, but still somehow underlines this whole emotional journey and all this information that you are given in this sequence, which is a lot of information. A lot of different aspects of their life are basically revealed in this sequence. That took several attempts and it began as something much more complex." The concluding piece of the album "The Whirling Ways of Stars that Pass" was featured in the film's end credits.

== Critical reception ==
Aggregator Metacritic, which uses a weighted average, assigned The Theory of Everything (Original Motion Picture Soundtrack) a score of 69 out of 100 based on 4 critics, indicating "generally favorable reviews". In a four-star review, James Southall of Movie Wave wrote "The Theory of Everything is an impressive piece of work, charting a difficult dramatic path with great skill and managing to combine very different pulls of emotion and drama into a coherent whole. Fans of Desplat in particular will surely find much to admire." Andrew Le of Renowned for Sound wrote "Jóhannsson's score is a delight to lose yourself to either in the cinema or in your living room. It is intricately infused with humanity and emotion, making it a fitting complement to the film." John Garratt of PopMatters wrote "Jóhann Jóhannsson wasn't hired to get our attention; he was hired to enhance a movie. The Theory of Everything the soundtrack album may or may not find life outside of the film's release, but Jóhannsson doesn't have to count on that. At the rate he works, he's probably moved on to the next thing already." Simon Smith of Higher Plain Music wrote "This is a lovely soundtrack, understated in many ways. It's one to listen to mostly with some wine late at night for contemplation and reflection and it will easily make you muse at whatever your theories are for whatever you're thinking about."

Jonathan Broxton of Movie Music UK wrote "one of the other significant things The Theory of Everything has going for it is emotion. Unlike Prisoners, which was sterile and emotionless by design, Jóhannsson imbues this work with a passion, encompassing all aspects of Hawking's life: the joy of discovery, the celebration of intellect, the passion of first love and, later, the despair at the failure of his physical attributes. Jóhannsson's score is not melodramatic, though, and doesn't overwhelm or overplay the drama – instead, his understatement and taste makes the emotional moments, when they come, seem much more powerful than they would otherwise be. This is a perfect example of a score that benefits enormously from subtlety and restraint, instead of wallowing in mawkishness [...] If you have not yet explored the work of Jóhann Jóhannsson, this is undoubtedly the place to start. It's more accessible than his score for Prisoners, less obscure than things like McCanick, and less abstract than the classical and concert works that got him noticed in the first place." Timothy Monger of AllMusic wrote "Often known for blending icy minimalism with textural electronics, Jóhannsson's work here is far more sentimental, telling the story of Hawking's humanity rather than his science."

A review published by Mfiles said "Given Johann Johannsson's relative inexperience in the realm of mainstream film scoring, The Theory of Everything is both a delightful surprise and a very impressive achievement. Such a dialogue-heavy movie, not to mention one that deals with incredibly sensitive subject matter, must have been a very difficult one to score. Push the music too hard and it risks turning the narrative into an overblown melodrama; pitch it too quietly and the emotions of the film may not be drawn out. It's entirely to Johannsson's credit that he's composed a score both subtle and highly engaging, gently enhancing the movie whilst allowing Redmayne and Jones' excellent performances to stand out. Resplendent in a sense of intimacy whilst also alluding to the more expansive, universal themes on which Stephen Hawking has built his career, The Theory of Everything is a fine piece of work and most deserving of its Oscar nomination." Bill Desowitz of IndieWire called it as "a musical big-bang". Anna Wilson of Clash Music gave a 7/10 to the score and wrote "This music has been approached emotionally rather than theoretically, in direct contrast to the film's subject – it chooses to focus on the transcendence of love. A stirring accomplishment."

== Track listing ==
No.	Title	Length
1.	"Cambridge, 1963"	1:41
2.	"Rowing"	1:42
3.	"Domestic Pressures"	2:37
4.	"Chalkboard"	1:05
5.	"Cavendish Lab"	2:31
6.	"Collapsing Inwards"	2:17
7.	"A Game of Croquet"	2:45
8.	"The Origins of Time"	2:21
9.	"Viva Voce"	1:36
10.	"The Wedding"	1:42
11.	"The Dreams that Stuff is Made of"	1:51
12.	"A Spacetime Singularity"	2:16
13.	"The Stairs"	1:07
14.	"A Normal Family"	1:41
15.	"Forces of Attraction"	2:03
16.	"Rowing (Alternative Version)"	0:37
17.	"Camping"	1:18
18.	"Coma"	1:03
19.	"The Spelling Board"	0:59
20.	"The Voice Box"	0:51
21.	"A Brief History of Time"	2:02
22.	"Daisy, Daisy"	2:21
23.	"A Model of the Universe"	2:52
24.	"The Theory of Everything"	1:08
25.	"London, 1988"	2:52
26.	"Epilogue"	1:48
27.	"The Whirling Ways of Stars that Pass"	1:52
Total length:		48:58

== Accolades ==
Award	Date of ceremony	Category	Recipients	Result	Ref.
Academy Award	22 February 2015	Best Original Score	Jóhann Jóhannsson	Nominated	
British Academy Film Awards	8 February 2015	Best Film Music	Jóhann Jóhannsson	Nominated	
Critics' Choice Movie Award	15 January 2015	Best Score	Jóhann Jóhannsson	Nominated	
Golden Globe Award	11 January 2015	Best Original Score	Jóhann Jóhannsson	Won	
Grammy Awards	15 February 2016	Best Score Soundtrack for Visual Media	Jóhann Jóhannsson	Nominated	
Houston Film Critics Society	10 January 2015	Best Original Score	Jóhann Jóhannsson	Nominated	
International Film Music Critics Association	19 February 2015	Best Original Score for a Drama	Jóhann Jóhannsson	Nominated	
Washington D.C. Area Film Critics Association	8 December 2014	Best Original Score	Jóhann Jóhannsson	Nominated	

== Charts ==
Chart performance for The Theory of Everything (Original Motion Picture Soundtrack)
Chart (2023–2024)	Peak position
Belgian Albums (Ultratop Flanders)	136
