= Belterra, Pará =

- City
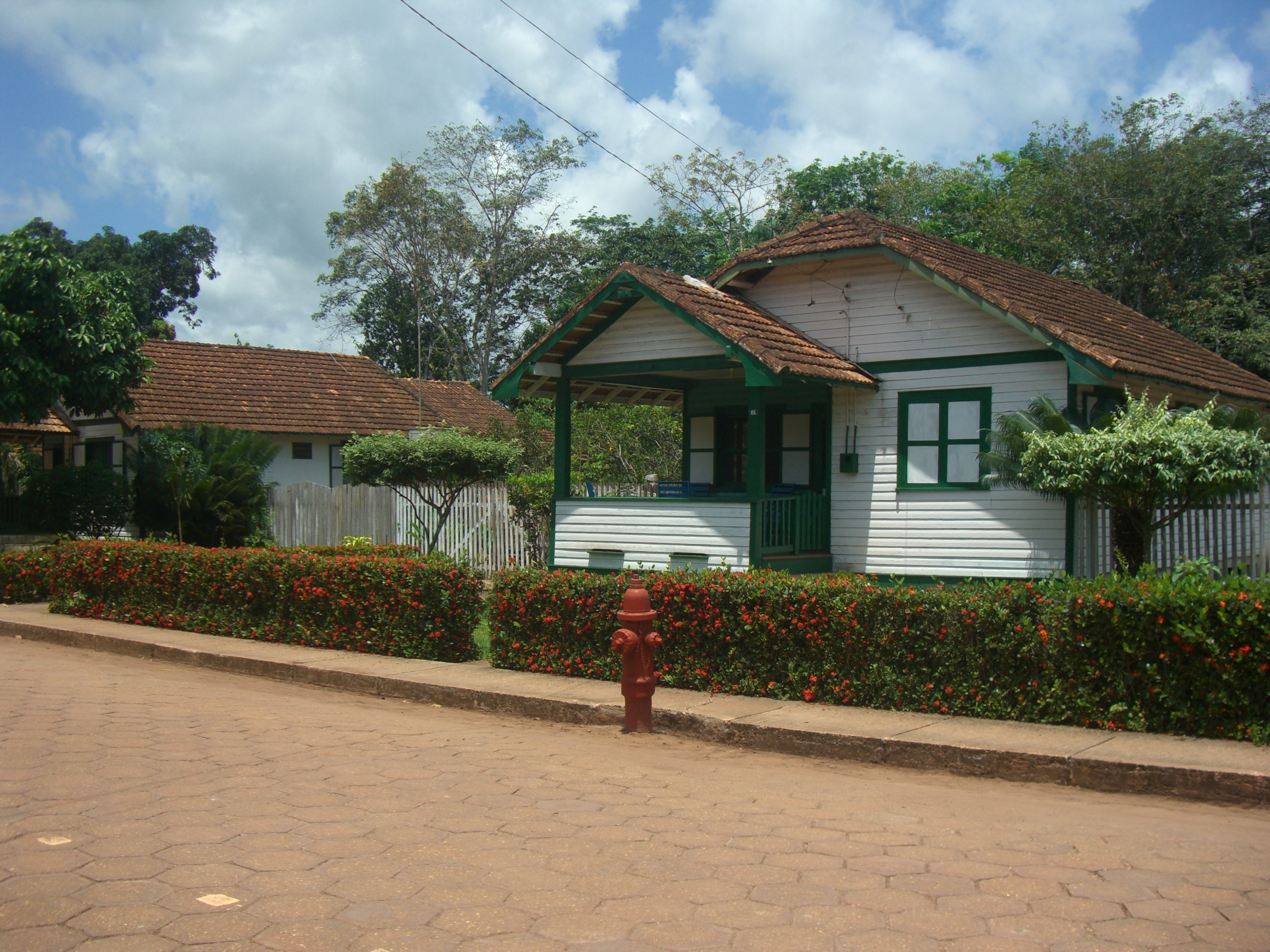

- Flag Coat of arms
- Nickname: Sierra Princess (Princesa da Serra in Portuguese)
- Location of Belterra in the State of Pará, Brazil

- Localization of Belterra in Brazil
- Coordinates: 02°38′09″S 54°56′13″W
- Country: Brazil
- State: Pará
- Founded: December 29, 1995

Government
  - Mayor: Geraldo Irineu Pastana de Oliveira (PT)

Area
  - Total: 4,398.346 km^{2} (1,698.211 sq mi)
- Elevation: 152 m (499 ft)

Population (2020)
  - Total: 17,839
  - Density: 3.71/km^{2} (9.6/sq mi)
- Demonym: belterrense
- Time zone: UTC−3 (BRT)

Belterra is a municipal seat and rubber plantation site some 40 km (25 mi) south of the Brazilian city of Santarém in the Northern federal state of Pará, at the edge of the Planalto at 165 m (541 ft) above sea level.

== Location ==
Amongst soil scientists, Belterra is famous for the underlying fertile, anthropogenic soil of 'Terra preta', which might have been amongst the criteria for the selection of this site for the plantation. While Terra Preta soil patterns occur all over the Brazilian lowland, this site is extremely well developed and also scientifically surveyed and documented.

The tertiary highland is composed of some 40–50 m (130–160 ft) clay layers (Belterra clay) of kaolinitic sediments of a Pliocene lake, with a distinct escarpment to the North and West of the plain, which leads down to the Várzea forest lowland at the river bank of the Tapajós river.

The municipality holds part of the Tapajós National Forest, a 549,067-hectare (1,356,770-acre) sustainable use conservation unit created in 1974.

== History ==
^{14}C analyses based on Terra Preta ceramic artefacts found in Belterra showed, that this area was populated and cultivated by the indigenous population in an intensive way at least since 500 B.C.

Belterra was founded as a rubber plantation, after the economic failure of Fordlândia, which had been founded in 1928 by Henry Ford. The intention of the US-Department of Commerce in the 1920s was to produce rubber in Brazil and to import it to USA. The advantage of the Belterra plantation over the plantation of Fordlândia 100 km (62 mi) to the south is the flat topography, which enables the use of machinery. At its peak in the late 1930s, some 50 km^{2} (19 sq mi) were cultivated with Hevea brasiliensis (rubber tree).

In Belterra, new breeding methods with local varieties were applied, which prevented the leaf disease, a result of the monoculture in Fordlândia. This was very labour-intensive and therefore expensive. Together with the worldwide decline on demand on natural rubber, the plantation was not cost-effective anymore. Ford sold it to the Brazilian government, which is still running the plantation under EMBRAPA.

Today, the area of the plantation is some 10–20 km^{2} (3.9–7.7 sq mi) covered extensively with mainly old rubber trees. It still gives the impression of a plantation with some 1000 - 2000 inhabitants (mainly plantation workers and their families). At its peak, it had a population of some 8,000 - 10,000 people. According to a 2010 census, the entire district population, including surrounding villages, is reported as 16,324.

== Climate ==
Belterra has a tropical monsoon climate (Köppen: Am) characterized by high temperatures and humidity throughout the year. The city experiences a distinct wet season from January to June, while the rest of the year is drier.

Climate data for Belterra (1991–2020)
Month	Jan	Feb	Mar	Apr	May	Jun	Jul	Aug	Sep	Oct	Nov	Dec	Year
Mean daily maximum °C (°F)	30.6 (87.1)	30.0 (86.0)	30.0 (86.0)	30.1 (86.2)	30.3 (86.5)	30.6 (87.1)	31.0 (87.8)	31.9 (89.4)	32.6 (90.7)	32.9 (91.2)	32.5 (90.5)	31.7 (89.1)	31.2 (88.2)
Daily mean °C (°F)	25.8 (78.4)	25.3 (77.5)	25.3 (77.5)	25.5 (77.9)	25.6 (78.1)	25.6 (78.1)	25.6 (78.1)	26.2 (79.2)	26.9 (80.4)	27.1 (80.8)	27.0 (80.6)	26.5 (79.7)	26.0 (78.8)
Mean daily minimum °C (°F)	21.9 (71.4)	21.6 (70.9)	21.7 (71.1)	22.0 (71.6)	21.9 (71.4)	21.6 (70.9)	21.3 (70.3)	21.6 (70.9)	22.2 (72.0)	22.4 (72.3)	22.4 (72.3)	22.2 (72.0)	21.9 (71.4)
Average precipitation mm (inches)	222.4 (8.76)	251.9 (9.92)	325.5 (12.81)	300.4 (11.83)	241.6 (9.51)	139.0 (5.47)	101.3 (3.99)	47.5 (1.87)	32.6 (1.28)	53.6 (2.11)	73.5 (2.89)	89.1 (3.51)	1,878.4 (73.95)
Average precipitation days (≥ 1.0 mm)	14.7	17.4	19.7	19.2	18.2	14.4	11.4	6.0	4.3	3.4	4.6	7.5	140.8
Average relative humidity (%)	88.1	89.8	90.3	90.9	90.9	89.9	88.8	86.2	83.4	81.7	82.7	84.3	87.3
Average dew point °C (°F)	24.2 (75.6)	24.1 (75.4)	24.2 (75.6)	24.5 (76.1)	24.6 (76.3)	24.5 (76.1)	24.4 (75.9)	24.7 (76.5)	24.7 (76.5)	24.6 (76.3)	24.6 (76.3)	24.4 (75.9)	24.5 (76.1)
Mean monthly sunshine hours	157.6	125.8	131.3	135.1	152.3	189.6	221.8	250.5	234.4	220.6	193.7	184.6	2,197.3
Source: NOAA

== See also ==
- List of municipalities in Pará
