= Fordlandia (album) =

Studio album by Jóhann Jóhannsson
- Released: 3 November 2008
- Recorded: Reykjavík, Iceland; Drammen, Norway; Prague, Czech Republic
- Genre: Minimalist, ambient
- Length: 67:03
- Label: 4AD
- Producer: Jóhann Jóhannsson

Jóhann Jóhannsson chronology
Englabörn (2007)	Fordlandia (2008)	And in the Endless Pause There Came the Sound of Bees (2009)

Professional ratings
Review scores
Source	Rating
Allmusic	4/5 stars
Pitchfork Media	(6.7/10)

Fordlandia is the sixth full-length studio album by Icelandic musician Jóhann Jóhannsson. The album was released on 3 November 2008 via 4AD, his second new release for the record label (following 2006's IBM 1401, A User's Manual).

The album is thematically influenced by the failure of Henry Ford's Brazilian rubber plant Fordlândia. On his official website, Jóhannsson explained the album's relation to the Henry Ford-owned location:

One of the two main threads running through it is this idea of failed utopia, as represented by the "Fordlândia" title – the story of the rubber plantation Henry Ford established in the Amazon in 1920s, and his dreams of creating an idealized American town in the middle of the jungle complete with white picket fences, hamburgers and alcohol prohibition. The project – started because of the high price Ford had to pay for the rubber necessary for his cars' tyres – failed, of course, as the indigenous workers soon rioted against the alien conditions.

Ford bought two and a half million acres for Fordlandia, costing him $125,000, and had many Brazilian workers and their families come to live in Fordlandia (most ended up complaining about it). Too much time and money were spent on recreating a beautiful, American town than working out how to successfully grow rubber in the Amazon, including building a 150-foot water tower (despite being in the middle of a rainforest). Fordlandia ultimately failed and Ford's dream was crushed without ever producing any rubber for his tyres. Around 20 million dollars was spent on the project.

== Track listing ==
1. "Fordlandia" – 13:42
2. "Melodia (i)" – 1:56
3. "The Rocket Builder (Lo Pan!)" – 6:24
4. "Melodia (ii)" – 1:48
5. "Fordlandia – Aerial View" – 4:32
6. "Melodia (iii)" – 3:12
7. "Chimaerica" – 3:22
8. "Melodia (iv)" – 2:45
9. "The Great God Pan Is Dead" – 4:55
10. "Melodia (Guidelines for a Space Propulsion Device Based on Heim's Quantum Theory)" – 9:03
11. "How We Left Fordlandia" – 15:24

Digital download bonus track

12. "Abandoned Locomotive Overgrown by Luxuriant Vegetation" – 5:16

== Credits ==
- Written, arranged, and produced by Jóhann Jóhannsson.
  - Jóhann Jóhannsson – piano, organ, pipe organ, electric organ, guitar, and electronics.
  - Matthias M.D. Hemstock – percussion and electronics on tracks 3, 5, 10, and 11.
  - Guðmundur Sigurðsson – pipe organ on track 7.
  - Guðni Franzson – clarinet on tracks 2, 4, and 8.
  - Bohumil Kotmel – concert master on tracks 1, 9, 10, and 11.
  - Miriam Nemcova – conductor on tracks 1, 9, 10, and 11.
  - James Fitzpatrick – orchestra contractor.
  - The City of Prague Philharmonic Orchestra and Chorus – orchestra and choir on tracks 1, 9, 10, and 11.
  - Orchestrated by Jóhann Jóhannsson.
  - Tracks 10 and 11 orchestrated by Arnar Bjarnason.
  - Strings on tracks 3 and 5 by Guðmundur Kristmundsson, Hrafnkell Orri Egilsson, Una Sveinbjarnardóttir, and Greta Guðnadóttir.
  - Storm recordings on track 9 by BJ Nilsen.
- Orchestra (Prague) recorded by Jan Holzner.
- Pipe organ (Drammen) recorded by Thomas Wolden.
- String quartet and pipe organ (both in Reykjavík) recorded by Finnur Hákonarsson.
- Mastered by Steve Rooke.
- Mixed by Finnur Hákonarsson and Jóhann Jóhannsson.
- Art direction and design by Vaughan Oliver at v23.
- Artwork concept by Jóhann Jóhannsson.
- Design assistance by Chris Bigg and Stuart Munro.
- Rocket image manipulation by Marc Atkins.
