= Aveiro, Pará =

Municipality in Pará, Brazil

- Municipality
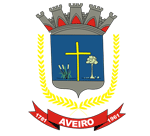
- Flag Coat of arms

- Location of Aveiro within Pará

- Location in Brazil Aveiro, Pará (Brazil)
- Coordinates: 3°37′S 55°19′W
- Country: Brazil
- Region: Northern
- State: Pará
- Mesoregion: Sudoeste Paraense

Population (2020)
  - Total: 16,404
- Time zone: UTC−3 (BRT)

Aveiro, Pará is a municipality in the state of Pará in the Northern region of Brazil.

The municipality holds part of the Tapajós National Forest, a 549,067-hectare (1,356,770-acre) sustainable use conservation unit created in 1974.

The town of Fordlândia is located in the municipality.

== See also ==
- List of municipalities in Pará
- Fordlândia
