= Englabörn =

Studio album by Jóhann Jóhannsson
- Released: 2002
- Genres: Electronic, classical music
- Length: 47:56
- Label: Touch Music
- Producer: Jóhann Jóhannsson

Jóhann Jóhannsson chronology
Englabörn (2002)	Dís (2004)

Englabörn is the first full-length studio album by Icelandic musician Jóhann Jóhannsson, released by Touch Music in 2002. Music included on Englabörn was composed for a play by Hávar Sigurjónsson and was played by string quartet, percussionists and Jóhansson himself on several instruments. The album consists of mostly short pieces combining classical, ambient and electronic influences.

== Critical reception ==
Professional ratings
Review scores
Source	Rating
Allmusic	4/5 stars
Pitchfork	8.9/10 (2003); 8.0/10 (2008)

The album received an 8.9 rating from Pitchfork Media on initial review.

== Track listing ==
All tracks are written by Jóhann Jóhannsson.

No.	Title	Length
1.	"Odi Et Amo"	3:10
2.	"Englabörn"	1:34
3.	"Jói & Karen"	3:24
4.	"Þetta Gerist Á Bestu Bæjum"	1:02
5.	"Sálfræðingur"	3:49
6.	""Ég Sleppi Þér Aldrei""	2:57
7.	"Sálfræðingur Deyr"	3:40
8.	"Bað"	3:07
9.	""Ég Heyrði Allt Án Þess Að Hlusta""	2:05
10.	"Karen Býr Til Engil"	3:45
11.	"Englabörn – Tilbrigði"	1:24
12.	""Ég Átti Gráa Æsku""	3:41
13.	"Krókódíll"	2:45
14.	""Ef Ég Hefði Aldrei...""	3:42
15.	"…Eins Og Venjulegt Fólk"	3:51
16.	"Odi Et Amo – Bis"	4:00

== Personnel ==
Credits for Englabörn adapted from AllMusic.

- Aron Þór Árnason – mixing
- Ethos String Quartet – string quartet
- Viðar Hákon Gíslason – engineer, mixing, recording
- Greta Guðnadóttir – group member, violin
- Matthías Hemstock – percussion
- Jóhann Jóhannsson – arranger, composer, electronics, glockenspiel, harmonium, organ, piano, producer
- Gudmundur Kristmundsson – group member, string quartet
- Jon Wozencroft – photography
