= Arrival (soundtrack) =

Arrival (Original Motion Picture Soundtrack)

Soundtrack album by Jóhann Jóhannsson
- Released: November 11, 2016
- Genre: Film score
- Length: 56:20
- Label: Deutsche Grammophon
- Producer: Jóhann Jóhannsson

Jóhann Jóhannsson chronology
Orphée (2016)	Arrival (Original Motion Picture Soundtrack) (2016)	The Mercy (Original Motion Picture Soundtrack) (2018)

Arrival (Original Motion Picture Soundtrack) is the soundtrack composed by Jóhann Jóhannsson for Denis Villeneuve's 2016 film Arrival. It was released under Deutsche Grammophon on November 11, 2016, the same day as the film's theatrical release. The score was met with critical acclaim and received accolades at various ceremonies, including a nomination for the BAFTA Award for Best Original Music and Golden Globe Award for Best Original Score, but was ruled ineligible for contention at the 89th Academy Awards.

== Background ==
Jóhann Jóhannsson was involved in pre-production for Arrival, and took early influence for the score from the film's script, concept art and initial discussions with director Denis Villeneuve about its mood and themes. It was their third and final collaboration following Prisoners (2013) and Sicario (2015). The pair did not discuss the music in detail; Jóhannsson recalled that Villeneuve "basically gave [him] carte blanche to experiment", particularly in the early stages of composition, before collaborating more closely alongside the film's editor Joe Walker once "the sound [had] been established" in order to "[find] the right places, the right moments for music" within the film. Arrival was shot without temp music, which meant Jóhannsson needed to have material ready before the editing process; he also noted that this approach required "good rapport and communication between the three of [them]". The film was edited first without music to ensure that each scene worked on its own without it, before Jóhann's score was reintroduced as "a strengthener".

Due to the importance of language and communication in the film's story, Jóhannsson immediately decided that his score would need to prominently feature the human voice. However, he sought to distance himself stylistically from the work of György Ligeti, due to the association of his vocal music with the classic 1968 science fiction film 2001: A Space Odyssey, and therefore avoided cluster chords and micropolyphony in favor of "irregular and arrhythmic patterns of short notes which start small and are then layered to create a kind of cloud of short staccato polyrhythmic voices". He likened the resultant "Morse code-like phrases" to "the babbling of a new infant trying to understand – or subconsciously absorb – the basic structure of a language", further reflecting the themes of the film. Jóhannsson intended the score to contain "very unconventional, avant-garde, extended-technique choral writing as opposed to the more traditional choir sounds", so he worked with the vocal ensemble Theatre of Voices due to their "very good command of exotic vocal techniques". He took further influence from pieces such as Stimmung (1968) by Karlheinz Stockhausen, particularly through the composer's "use of overtones and harmonic singing and his aleatoric approach to performance", as well as the work of spectralist composers Gérard Grisey and Horațiu Rădulescu. For the score's orchestral and choral writing, he consulted the work of composers such as Grisey, Giacinto Scelsi, Michael Gordon, Georg Friedrich Haas and Meredith Monk.

Jóhannsson also prominently used tape loops in his score to reflect the circular motifs found in Arrival, such as the logograms that make up the aliens' written language. He used a 16-track analogue tape recorder to record a long tape loop with layers of piano drones (sustained without the attack) that were recorded at different speeds and then slowed down. He also enlisted frequent collaborator Lichens to sing and hum a sequence of notes over the drone "in a unique, harmonic way that's hard to distinguish as a human voice". Jóhannsson described the end result as "an extremely eerie, unsettling piece of music without any processing at all". The score's percussion was largely wooden, such as "basic" 2×4 planks of wood played with mallets, and was recorded in a "large reverberant space" before being layered and digitally processed with added effects. These sounds were typically used during the film's more action oriented scenes.

== Reception ==
=== Critical reception ===
Professional ratings
Review scores
Source	Rating
AllMusic	4.5/5 stars
Clash	7/10

The score received critical acclaim. AllMusic critic Rob Wacey hailed the soundtrack as both "a fantastic album and a great piece of film score work, delivering menacing, daunting cacophonies of noise that evoke all types of fear, wonder, and intrigue that are evident within the movie itself". Conversely, Josh Gray of Clash found that "listening to it without the visual stimulus of Villeneuve's accompanying film sells the score short", concluding that "despite its originality and powerful execution of atonal techniques, it is too tonally diverse to function properly as a separate entity from its corresponding film". IndieWire's Ben Croll found Jóhann's "iron death rattle score" to be one of the film's many elements that were "perfect alone and better together".

In his review of the film for RogerEbert.com Brian Tallerico praised Jóhann's compositions, calling them "essential to every emotional beat of the film, defining the air of tension in the first half of the film and the moving undercurrents of the final act". Similarly, Time's Stephanie Zacharek found it "so integral to the images that it may as well be their heartbeat—it's spooky and sonorous, a spectral hum". Christopher Orr of The Atlantic found the score "multifaceted and occasionally spellbinding, not least when its low horns boom with menace, almost like an alien voice themselves". Nigel Andrews, writing for the Financial Times, noted that the soundtrack "adds a deeper layer of the fathomless-ethereal" and "[keeps] us moored to this planet while suggesting the distant, sonorous possibilities of those beyond", while The Irish Times critic Donald Clarke called it a "brilliantly insidious score – alive with mournful strings and sharp exhalations".

=== Accolades ===
The soundtrack was ruled ineligible for contention at the 89th Academy Awards, due to the film's prominent use of the Max Richter piece "On the Nature of Daylight" in its opening and final scenes. It was disqualified on the basis that audiences would not be able to distinguish the piece from Jóhann's score.

Award	Date of ceremony	Category	Recipient(s)	Result	Ref.
Austin Film Critics Association	December 28, 2016	Best Score	Jóhann Jóhannsson	Nominated	
British Academy Film Awards	February 12, 2017	Best Original Music	Arrival	Nominated	
Chicago Film Critics Association	December 15, 2016	Best Original Score	Jóhann Jóhannsson	Nominated	
Critics' Choice Awards	December 11, 2016	Best Score	Jóhann Jóhannsson	Nominated	
Empire Awards	March 19, 2017	Best Soundtrack	Arrival	Nominated	
Florida Film Critics Circle	December 23, 2016	Best Score	Arrival	Nominated	
Georgia Film Critics Association	January 13, 2017	Best Original Score	Jóhann Jóhannsson	Nominated	
Golden Globe Awards	January 8, 2017	Best Original Score	Jóhann Jóhannsson	Nominated	
Hollywood Music in Media Awards	November 17, 2016	Best Original Score – Sci-Fi/Fantasy Film	Jóhann Jóhannsson	Nominated	
Houston Film Critics Society	January 6, 2017	Best Original Score	Jóhann Jóhannsson	Nominated	
IndieWire Critics Poll	December 19, 2016	Best Original Score or Soundtrack	Arrival	4th Place	
San Francisco Film Critics Circle	December 11, 2016	Best Original Score	Jóhann Jóhannsson	Nominated	
Seattle Film Critics Society	January 5, 2017	Best Original Score	Jóhann Jóhannsson	Won	
St. Louis Film Critics Association	December 18, 2016	Best Music/Score	Jóhann Jóhannsson	Nominated	
Washington D.C. Area Film Critics Association	December 5, 2016	Best Score	Jóhann Jóhannsson	Nominated	

== Track listing ==
All tracks are produced by Jóhann Jóhannsson.

Arrival (Original Motion Picture Soundtrack)
No.	Title	Writer(s)	Length
1.	"Arrival"	Jóhann Jóhannsson	2:50
2.	"Heptapod B"	Joan La Barbara; Jóhannsson	3:42
3.	"Sapir-Whorf"	Jóhannsson	1:16
4.	"Hydraulic Lift"	Jóhannsson	3:32
5.	"First Encounter"	Jóhannsson	4:49
6.	"Transmutations at a Distance"	Jóhannsson	1:34
7.	"Around the Clock News"	Jóhannsson	1:34
8.	"Xenolinguistics"	Jóhannsson	3:29
9.	"Ultimatum"	Jóhannsson	1:52
10.	"Principle of Least Time"	Jóhannsson	1:20
11.	"Hazmat"	Jóhannsson	4:48
12.	"Hammers and Nails"	Jóhannsson	2:31
13.	"Xenoanthropology"	Jóhannsson	3:08
14.	"Non-Zero Sum Game"	Jóhannsson	4:17
15.	"Properties of Explosive Materials"	Jóhannsson	3:31
16.	"Escalation"	Jóhannsson	2:02
17.	"Decyphering"	Jóhannsson	2:05
18.	"One of Twelve"	Jóhannsson	3:09
19.	"Rise"	Jóhannsson	1:47
20.	"Kangaru"	La Barbara; Jóhannsson	2:55
Total length:			56:20

== Charts ==
Chart (2016)	Peak position
UK Soundtrack Albums (OCC)	18
US Soundtrack Albums (Billboard)	12
