= IBM 1401, A User's Manual =

Studio album by Jóhann Jóhannsson
- Released: October 30, 2006
- Recorded: 2003–2006
- Studio: Barrandov Studios, Smecky Soundstage, Prague; various locations in Reykjavík, Skálholt, Florence, Madrid, Zürich, Piran, and Rennes
- Genre: Electronic, avant-garde
- Length: 42:50
- Language: English
- Label: 4AD
- Producer: Jóhann Jóhannsson

Jóhann Jóhannsson chronology
Dís (2004)	IBM 1401, A User's Manual (2006)	Fordlandia (2008)

Singles from IBM 1401, A User's Manual
- 1. "The Sun's Gone Dim and the Sky's Turned Black" Released: October 9, 2006

IBM 1401, A User's Manual is the fourth full-length studio album by Icelandic musician Jóhann Jóhannsson, released by 4AD on October 30, 2006.

4AD released the album on vinyl for the first time on December 8, 2017. The reissue was a double LP pressing on clear-coloured vinyl and included two previously unreleased live bonus tracks.

== Critical reception ==
Professional ratings
Review scores
Source	Rating
Allmusic	4/5 stars
musicOMH	5/5 stars
Pitchfork Media	6.9/10
Slant Magazine	4.5/5 stars
Stylus Magazine	B+

Upon its release, IBM 1401, A User's Manual received mostly positive reviews from music critics. Pitchfork's Mark Richardson gave it a 6.9, saying that the record "begins beautifully" and has a "powerful finish", "but the long sag in the middle makes IBM 1401 – A User's Manual a bit harder to recommend overall."

Sal Cinquemani for Slant Magazine said that the album "gives you the sense of hearing something truly ancient being married to something very modern and present, and, then, something very futuristic." Cinquemani praised the album's ambition and thematic work while noting that it was less musically varied. "Some theorists claim humans can simulate anything with a computer, even a soul," Cinquemani concluded, "and with IBM 1401 - A User’s Manual, Jóhannsson comes chillingly close."

== Track listing ==
All tracks are written by Jóhann Jóhannsson and Sigvaldi Kaldalóns.

No.	Title	Length
1.	"Part 1 / IBM 1401 Processing Unit"	8:32
2.	"Part 2 / IBM 1403 Printer"	9:32
3.	"Part 3 / IBM 1402 Card Read-Punch"	10:23
4.	"Part 4 / IBM 729 II Magnetic Tape Unit" (vocals by Erna Ómarsdóttir)	7:15
5.	"Part 5 / The Sun's Gone Dim and the Sky's Turned Black" (vocals by Jóhann Jóhannsson, lyrics by Dorothy Parker)	7:09

Vinyl-only bonus tracks
No.	Title	Length
6.	"Part 1 / IBM 1401 Processing Unit" (live with the City of Prague Philharmonic Orchestra)
7.	"Part 5 / The Sun's Gone Dim and the Sky's Turned Black" (live with the City of Prague Philharmonic Orchestra)

== Personnel ==
Credits for IBM 1401, A User's Manual adapted from Allmusic.

- Chris Bigg – art direction, design, photography
- Arnar Bjarnason – arranging
- City of Prague Philharmonic Orchestra – orchestra
- Elias Davidsson – recording
- Finnur Hakonarsson – mixing
- Jan Holzner – engineering
- Jóhann Jóhannsson – bells, celeste, Hammond organ, liner notes, piano, production, recording, vocals
- Örn Kaldalóns – recording
- Vaughan Oliver – art direction, design
- Erna Órnarsdóttir – vocals
- City of Prague Philharmonic Orchestra – ensemble
- Nick Webb – mastering
