= Mandy (soundtrack) =

Mandy (Original Motion Picture Soundtrack)

Film score by Jóhann Jóhannsson
- Released: September 14, 2018
- Recorded: 2017–2018
- Genre: Film score
- Length: 43:15
- Label: Lakeshore; Invada
- Producer: Randall Dunn

Jóhann Jóhannsson chronology
Mary Magdalene (2018)	Mandy (2018)	The Shadow Play (2019)

Mandy (Original Motion Picture Soundtrack) is the soundtrack album to the 2018 film Mandy directed by Panos Cosmatos. The album featured the film's original score composed by Jóhann Jóhannsson in one of his final films he scored and released before his death. The album was released day-and-date with the film on September 14, 2018, through Lakeshore Records.

== Development ==
While Cosmatos liked Jóhannsson's work, he did not consider him to score the film, as he was becoming an established composer during that time and was out of his reach. But after a telephonic conversation with the former, Jóhannsson agreed to be onboard as he liked Cosmatos' debut feature Beyond the Black Rainbow (2010). Jóhannsson described the film as "a surreal sort of supernatural thriller, an extremely visionary film, unlike anything I've seen before". He received the mood boards to the film, while he finished the score for Arrival (2016). According to Jóhannsson's manager Tim Husom, "They were unbelievably cool and scary".

Some of the inspirations that Cosmatos provided for Jóhannsson were, Queen's soundtrack for Flash Gordon (1980) and the Van Halen's album Fair Warning (1981). However, Jóhannsson's score did not reference any of them; the score comprises electronic and live instrumentation that was being heavily edited and processed for a "dark, massive, industrial-metal sound" that matched the violent tone of the film. The score featured Stephen O'Malley from Sunn O))) playing guitars. Randall Dunn served as the music producer and discussed with Jóhannsson on the use of specific analogue synthesizers. The team found a studio in Italy where most of the synth recording were done.

90% of the film's score had been completed in time for the 2018 Sundance Film Festival premiere. Following Jóhannsson's death on February 9, 2018, the remainder of his cues were curated and produced by Pepijn Caudron and Yair Elazar Glotman. Caudron was initially hired as a music editor, but due to the slow post-production process, he also wrote a couple of cues mostly based on Jóhannsson's samples. According to Dunn, the music in the film and the soundtrack release were different. Dunn first heard the soundtrack and the film's music later and found that more material has been featured in the film while mixing. He felt the soundtrack to be a bonus material. The film was dedicated to Jóhannsson.

== Release ==
The soundtrack was announced on July 12, 2018, featuring 15 tracks and the song "Children of the New Dawn" released as a single, the following day. "Forging the Beast" was released as the second single on August 3, 2018. The album was released digitally through Lakeshore Records on September 14, and in CD and vinyl LP through Invada Records on October 19.

== Reception ==
=== Critical reception ===
Aggregator Metacritic, which uses a weighted average, assigned Mandy (Original Motion Picture Soundtrack) a score of 85 out of 100 based on 5 critics, which the website categorized as "universal acclaim".

Andy Beta of Pitchfork assigned the album, a score of 7.7 (out of 10) and summarized "In his final completed film score, the late composer and experimental musician revels in extreme sounds, delving into black metal, menacing ambient, doom drone, and piercing orchestrations." Aaron Vehling of Vehlinggo summarized "the Mandy score has a scuzzy, gritty tinge to it that recalls the films fuzzy, almost-VHS look. The score stands alone as an exceptional album, but it's truly impressive just how inseparable every element is from the film." Heather Phares of AllMusic wrote "Another triumph, Mandy reaffirms his mastery and hints at how much more he had to contribute." Critic based at The Wire summarized "The music for the horror/revenge fantasy developed from Cosmatos and Jóhannsson's mutual appreciation of heavy metal and psychotronic cinema, and it shows."

The Film Scorer wrote "Like many metal albums, Jóhannsson alternates between tender and heavy moments, particularly with the continued use of the “Mandy Love Theme” amidst crushing doom metal riffs. This combination adds empathy and emotional stakes to the film's over the top, grindhouse-styled action. Doing so elevates and gives meaning to what could otherwise be an empty experience." Valentin Maniglia of Score It Magazine wrote "rather than calling Mandy a testament album, I would rather call it promising, not only for what it delivers to the film itself but also because of how it is a turning point in its own style, firing up our imagination about what could have come next." Katie Rife of The A.V. Club wrote that "It marks a turning point in his musical style, an embrace of the lush and layered as well as the heavy and metallic." Calling it as "one of the best film scores of the year", Eric Kohn of IndieWire summarized it as "a fierce emotional arrangement of mournful synth and somber guitars, interspersed with jarring eruptions of percussion — all of which demonstrate the complex vision of Icelandic composer Jóhann Jóhannsson".

=== Year end lists ===
- 3rd – David Ehrlich, IndieWire
- 4th – Charlie Brigden, Film School Rejects
- 5th – Bilge Ebiri, Vulture
- 7th – Adam Chitwood, Collider

== Track listing ==
Mandy (Original Motion Picture Soundtrack) track listing
No.	Title	Length
1.	"Seeker of the Serpent's Eye"	2:11
2.	"Starling"	2:15
3.	"Mandy Love Theme"	4:38
4.	"Horns of Abraxas"	1:31
5.	"Black Skulls"	2:45
6.	"Death and Ashes"	4:38
7.	"Sand"	2:02
8.	"Red"	1:32
9.	"Forging the Beast"	1:46
10.	"Dive-Bomb Blues"	2:15
11.	"Waste"	2:55
12.	"Temple"	2:59
13.	"Burning Church"	1:37
14.	"Memories"	2:34
15.	"Children of the New Dawn"	5:31
16.	"Chainsaw Fight" (bonus track)	2:06
Total length:		43:15

== Charts ==
Chart (2018)	Peak position
UK Soundtrack Albums (OCC)	18

== Accolades ==
Accolades for Mandy (Original Motion Picture Soundtrack)
Award	Date of ceremony	Category	Recipients	Result	Ref.
Austin Film Critics Association Awards	January 7, 2019	Best Score	Jóhann Jóhannsson	Won	
Chicago Film Critics Association Awards	December 8, 2018	Best Original Score	Jóhann Jóhannsson	Nominated	
Detroit Film Critics Society Awards	December 3, 2018	Best Use of Music	Jóhann Jóhannsson	Nominated	
Fangoria Chainsaw Awards	February 25, 2019	Best Score	Jóhann Jóhannsson	Won	
Hollywood Music in Media Awards	November 14, 2018	Best Original Score — Independent Film	Jóhann Jóhannsson	Nominated	
Seattle Film Critics Society Awards	December 17, 2018	Best Original Score	Jóhann Jóhannsson	Won	
World Soundtrack Awards	October 17, 2018	Soundtrack Composer of the Year	Jóhann Jóhannsson	Won	
