= Unun (band) =

Icelandic pop-rock band, active 1993–1999

Unun were an Icelandic pop-rock band from Reykjavík. It was formed by Gunnar Lárus Hjálmarsson and Þór Eldon Jónsson (Thor Eldon) in 1993. They were joined by Ragnheiður Eiríksdóttir (Heiða) in 1994. The group disbanded in July 1999.

== Biography ==
The group was formed in 1993 by guitarist Þór Eldon Jónsson (formerly Fan Houtens Koko, of The Sugarcubes, aka Thor Eldon, and former husband of Björk), bassist Gunnar Lárus Hjálmarsson (Dr. Gunni, former SH Draumur, ex-Bless). The name appeared during a game of Scrabble. They were then joined by Kristín Jónsdóttir on vocals, then the trio goes back to Gunni's apartment. On April 1, 1994, they began recording their first studio album, titled Æ. During their sessions, the singer Ragnheiður Eiríksdóttir (Heiða) becomes a member of the group. In November 1994, their first album was released on the label Smekkleysa (Bad Taste). Jóhann Jóhannsson (formerly of Daisy Hill Puppy Farm), co-produces and plays keyboards on this album.

In the spring of 1995, the Icelandic lyrics of Æ are translated into English and the English version, Super Shiny Dreams, is released on the Bad Taste label in November 1995 in the United States and Europe. Björk is supported by Unun for three British dates, including an appearance at Wembley Arena in January 1996. In 1997, the group participates in the Roskilde Festival in Denmark. In 1998, the group lost its contract with the label Deceptive, but managed to publish a four-track EP called Bones. Thor performs his last concert with Unun at the Midt Fyn Festival. Back in Iceland, the band records their second album, Ótta, with Birna on keyboards, Viddi (ex-Quarashi) on bass, and Doddi (Kanada) on drums. The following year Unun toured Norway, Lithuania, Estonia and Finland. The group disbanded in July 1999.

Unun (Dr. Gunni, Heiða and Elvar) reunited briefly in 2007 for a concert dedicated to Lee Hazlewood.

== Discography ==
- 1994: Æ (Bad Taste)
- 1995: Super Shiny Dreams (Bad Taste)
- 1998: Bones (Bad Taste, EP)
- 1998: Ótta (Bad Taste)
