= Orphée (album) =

Studio album by Jóhann Jóhannsson
- Released: 16 September 2016
- Recorded: 2009–2016
- Genre: Modern classical
- Length: 46:26
- Label: Deutsche Grammophon
- Producer: Jóhann Jóhannsson

Jóhann Jóhannsson chronology
End of Summer (2015)	Orphée (2016)	Arrival (Original Motion Picture Soundtrack) (2016)

Orphée is a solo studio album by Icelandic composer Jóhann Jóhannsson. It was released on 16 September 2016, through Deutsche Grammophon. It received generally favorable reviews from critics.

== Background ==
The music of Orphée is inspired by Jean Cocteau's film of the same name, Ovid's interpretation of the Orpheus myth, and Jóhann Jóhannsson's own life changes, specifically his relocation from Copenhagen to Berlin. The album includes contributions from Jóhannsson (on piano, electronics, pipe organ, and electric organ), Hildur Guðnadóttir (on cello), the American Contemporary Music Ensemble, the London Recording Orchestra (conducted by Anthony Weeden), and the Theatre of Voices (conducted by Paul Hillier). Recordings of numbers stations are also used in the album.

== Critical reception ==
Professional ratings
Aggregate scores
Source	Rating
Metacritic	79/100
Review scores
Source	Rating
AllMusic	4.5/5 stars
The Guardian	3/5 stars
Pitchfork	7.5/10
PopMatters	7/10

According to the review aggregator Metacritic, Orphée received "generally favorable reviews" based on a weighted average score of 79 out of 100 from 7 critic scores.

Kate Molleson of The Guardian commented that Jóhann Jóhannsson "does lush, spacious things with piano, organ, solo cello, string quartet, string orchestra, voices and crackling electronics, and the arrangements are sensitively done, though I can't say I found much compelling drama in it." Heather Phares of AllMusic stated, "Like And in the Endless Pause There Came the Sound of Bees, Orphée is both more intimate than some of his larger works, and immediately recognizable as Jóhannsson's." She added, "On Orphée, Jóhannsson expresses the need to let some things and people go to let new ones in with remarkable nuance, as well as the affecting beauty fans have come to know and love." Mark Mobley of NPR stated, "If you're into Philip Glass and Michael Nyman and Arvo Pärt and movie soundtracks in general, this could be for you."

=== Accolades ===
Year-end lists for Orphée
Publication	List	Rank	Ref.
Les Inrockuptibles	The 50 Best Albums of 2016	28	
Rolling Stone	20 Best Avant Albums of 2016	11	

== Track listing ==
All tracks are written by Jóhann Jóhannsson.

No.	Title	Length
1.	"Flight from the City"	6:31
2.	"A Song for Europa"	2:33
3.	"The Drowned World"	2:20
4.	"A Deal with Chaos"	2:05
5.	"A Pile of Dust"	4:51
6.	"A Sparrow Alighted Upon Our Shoulder"	2:27
7.	"Fragment I"	1:24
8.	"By the Roes, and by the Hinds of the Field"	2:38
9.	"The Radiant City"	3:31
10.	"Fragment II"	2:12
11.	"The Burning Mountain"	2:45
12.	"De Luce et Umbra"	2:28
13.	"Good Morning, Midnight"	3:17
14.	"Good Night, Day"	3:57
15.	"Orphic Hymn"	3:27
Total length:		46:26

== Personnel ==
Credits adapted from liner notes.

Musicians

- Jóhann Jóhannsson – piano, electronics, pipe organ, electric organ, arrangement, orchestration, production, recording
- Hildur Guðnadóttir – cello

American Contemporary Music Ensemble

- Yuki Numata Resnick – violin
- Caleb Burhans – violin
- Ben Russell – viola
- Clarice Jensen – cello

The London Recording Orchestra

- Anthony Weeden – conducting, additional orchestration
- Hilary Skewes - musician contractor
- Jonathan Morton - orchestral leader

Theatre of Voices

- Paul Hillier – conducting
- Else Torp – soprano vocals
- Signe Asmussen – mezzo-soprano vocals
- Ellen Marie Brink Christensen – mezzo-soprano vocals
- Elenor Wiman – mezzo-soprano vocals
- Kristin Mulders – mezzo-soprano vocals
- Chris Watson – tenor vocals
- Paul Bentley-Angell – tenor vocals
- Jakob Bloch Jespersen – bass-baritone vocals
- Jakob Soelberg – bass-baritone vocals

Technical personnel

- Geoff Foster – recording
- Preben Iwan – recording
- Ívar Ragnarsson – recording
- Mette Due – recording
- Francesco Donadello – recording, mixing
- Calyx Mastering – mastering
- Owen Roberts – additional orchestration
- Christian Badzura – executive production
- Leonie Petersen – project management
- Burkhard Bartsch – project management
- Jens Schünemeyer – booklet editing
- Anders Ladegaard – artwork
- Jónatan Grétarsson – photography

== Charts ==
=== Weekly charts ===
Chart performance for Orphée
Chart (2016)	Peak position
UK Classical Artist Albums (OCC)	4
US Top Classical Albums (Billboard)	6

=== Year-end charts ===
Chart performance for Orphée
Chart (2016)	Peak position
Icelandic Albums (Plötutíóindi)	68
