= Eduardo Sguiglia =

- Occupations: Writer, economist
- Writing career
- Language: Spanish

Eduardo Sguiglia is an Argentine economist, writer and essayist.

== Published works ==
Sguiglia has written several novels, including Fordlandia (1997), Do not trust me, if your heart fails you (1999), A handful of glory (2003), Black Eyes (2010), Los cuerpos y las sombras (2014) and El miedo te come el alma (2017). Some novels have been finalists in the Dublin International Literary Award and Grinzane-Cavour. Fordlandia was selected one of the four best works of fiction in 2000 by The Washington Post and was translated into Portuguese, English, Italian and German. Sguiglia was narrative jury in Casa de las Américas (Cuba) and Casa del Teatro (Dominican Republic). In 2016, he was one of the seven Latin American creators who received the Fundación Jumex and Rockefeller Foundation prize. In 2023, he published La redención del camarada Petrov. In 2026, he published two theater plays: an adaptation of his last novel, by the same name, and ''La montaña y el tigre''.

He has also written several articles and essays on the economy and society of Argentina, including "Agustín Tosco" (1984), "El club de los poderosos" (1991), "Infraestructura y competividad" (1997) and "Las ideologías del poder económico" (2006). In this field, he has been awarded two national awards (Arcor Foundation 1993, Roggio Foundation, 1998), and for his work in foreign affairs he was honored by the governments of Bolivia, Chile and Brazil. As of 2026, he was publishing articles related to world and Argentine current affairs in widely circulated Argentine newspapers.

== Other work ==
Sguiglia had a prominent role in the peaceful resolution of the conflicts that took place in Bolivia during October 2003. He has also served in the public sector as president of the regulator of airports, undersecretary of Latin American policy, and as the first Argentine ambassador to Angola.

== Critical reception ==
The New York Times stated that his work was "reminiscent of the work of Conrad or Kafka, in which, faced with the extremes of an indifferent universe, human beings must come to terms with their own capricious inner landscapes".
