= Jóhann Jóhannsson =

Icelandic musician and composer (1969–2018)

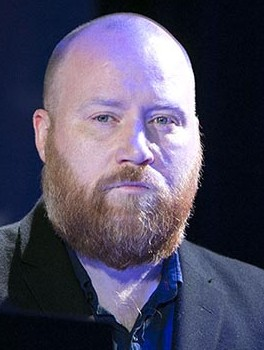
- Jóhann Jóhannsson in 2010

Background information
- Born: Jóhann Gunnar Jóhannsson; 19 September 1969; Reykjavík, Iceland
- Died: 9 February 2018 (aged 48) Berlin, Germany
- Occupations: Composer; producer; director
- Instruments: Piano; organ; synthesizer
- Years active: 1987–2018
- Labels: Deutsche Grammophon; 4AD; Touch; 12 Tónar
- Website: johannjohannsson.com

Jóhann Gunnar Jóhannsson (Icelandic pronunciation: [ˈjouːhan ˈjouːhansɔn]; 19 September 1969 – 9 February 2018) was an Icelandic composer who wrote music for a wide array of media including theatre, dance, television, and film. His work is stylised by its blending of traditional orchestration with contemporary electronic elements.

Jóhann released solo albums from 2002 onward. In 2016, he signed with Deutsche Grammophon, through which he released his last solo album, Orphée. Some of his works in film include the original scores for Denis Villeneuve's Prisoners, Sicario, and Arrival, and James Marsh's The Theory of Everything. Jóhannsson was nominated for an Academy Award for Best Original Score for both The Theory of Everything and Sicario, and won a Golden Globe for Best Original Score for the former. He earned a second Golden Globe nomination for Arrival. He was a music and sound consultant on Mother!, directed by Darren Aronofsky in 2017. His scores for Mary Magdalene and Mandy were released posthumously.

His only directorial work, Last and First Men, premiered at the Manchester International Festival in 2017, where he also performed the score live with the BBC Philharmonic Orchestra.

== Early life and career ==
Jóhann was born on 19 September 1969 in Reykjavík, Iceland, to Jóhann Gunnarsson, a maintenance engineer who worked for IBM, and Edda Thorkelsdóttir. He learned the piano and trombone from the age of 11, but had given them up during his teenage years. Jóhann attended the University of Iceland, where he studied languages and literature.

Jóhann started his musical career in the late 1980s in the proto-shoegaze-influenced band Daisy Hill Puppy Farm, who released a couple of EPs which were played by British DJ John Peel and received a fan letter from Steve Albini. He went on to work as a guitarist and producer playing in Icelandic indie rock bands, like Olympia, Unun and HAM. In 1999, Jóhann co-founded Kitchen Motors; a think tank, art organisation and music label that encouraged interdisciplinary collaborations between artists from punk, jazz, classical, metal and electronic music. His own sound arose out of these musical experimentations.

== Solo works ==
Jóhann's first solo album, Englabörn, was a suite based on the music written for the theatre piece of the same name. Jóhann approached the composition by recording string instruments and processing them through digital filters, which allowed him to deconstruct the recordings and reassemble them. The album combined holy minimalism, Satie, Purcell and Moondog with the electronic music of labels such as Mille Plateaux and Mego. Pitchfork gave Englabörn a score of 8.9, and described it as "exceptionally restrained, the piano moving like droplets from slowly melting icicles, the violin breathing warmth from above. The hesitation of each breath and falling bead feels as though it were a Morton Feldman piece condensed to three minutes."

For his second album, Virðulegu Forsetar, an hour-long ambient piece, Jóhann used an orchestra of 11 brass players, glockenspiel, piano and organ, with added bells and electronics, creating a sound that combined classical, ambient and experimental music.

IBM 1401, A User's Manual, Jóhann's fourth studio album, was released on 30 October 2006 on the 4AD label. It was inspired by his father, an IBM engineer and one of Iceland's first computer programmers, who used early hardware to compose melodies during his downtime at work. Jóhann used sounds produced from the electromagnetic emissions of the IBM 1401 as part of the composition.

Fordlandia, Jóhann's sixth full-length studio album, was released in November 2008 via 4AD, and was thematically influenced by the failure of Henry Ford's Brazilian rubber plant Fordlândia.

In 2010, Jóhann collaborated with filmmaker Bill Morrison on The Miners' Hymns (2011), a film and accompanying composition for a brass band, pipe organ and electronics, based on coal-mining in County Durham. The film was noted for celebrating "social, cultural, and political aspects of the extinct industry, and the strong regional tradition of colliery brass bands". The overall piece was itself a tribute to the miners strikes which occurred in the area during the 1980s. The piece premiered live in Durham Cathedral in July 2010 and was released on CD and DVD in May 2011. The album was described by the BBC as "a gorgeous brass-based requiem for northeast England's former mining community". Writing in The Observer, Fiona Maddocks gave the London debut performance of the score at the Barbican five stars, writing, "The strange counterpoint between an Icelandic minimalist, an American filmmaker and a bitter episode in recent British history has resulted in a work as unclassifiable as it is unforgettable."

In 2021 the Gold Dust EP was released, containing unused pieces from various previous projects.

On 15 September 2023, the posthumous album Prayer to the Dynamo was released on Bandcamp. This contains suites from Sicario and The Theory of Everything and was performed by the Iceland Symphony Orchestra.

== Film work ==
Jóhann had scored a number of works concurrent with his solo career through the 2000s including the Icelandic comedy Dis in 2004, TV series Svartir englar in 2007, and In the Arms of My Enemy in 2007. However it is his work with Denis Villeneuve for which he is best known. His first collaboration with Villeneuve was Prisoners in 2013. He subsequently worked on Villeneuve's films Sicario (2015), which was nominated for Academy Award for Best Original Score, and Arrival (2016). Jóhann joined Villeneuve once again to work on Blade Runner 2049, but at some point during production Villeneuve decided that the music needed a change in direction. In describing the artistic process for Blade Runner 2049, Villeneuve stated that "the movie needed something different, and I needed to go back to something closer to Vangelis. Jóhann and I decided that I will need to go in another direction." Villeneuve brought in Hans Zimmer and Benjamin Wallfisch to complete the project. Jóhann's work on James Marsh's The Theory of Everything won the Golden Globe Award for Best Original Score in 2015. His final works were for the films Mandy, The Mercy, and Mary Magdalene. In an interview following the release of Arrival, Jóhann commented on his process stating that "it's about putting yourself in a receptive state of mind where you react to inputs, and it can be from anywhere. It doesn't really matter if you're writing for film or if you're doing your own piece; you always have to put yourself into that space." He went on to say, "there are practical parameters, of course, involved in writing film music rather than doing your own album, but I view them very much as the same body of work. And, for me, there are very clear lines for me between Englabörn to Arrival."

Prior to his death he had been hired to compose the score for Disney's Christopher Robin, but died before he had begun work on it.

His only feature film directed by himself, Last and First Men, premiered two years after his death at the 70th Berlin International Film Festival, where it received widespread acclaim.

== Collaborations and other projects ==
In March 2015, Jóhann teamed up with ACME (American Contemporary Music Ensemble) and the Grammy Award-winning vocal ensemble Roomful of Teeth to perform Drone Mass. Described as a contemporary oratorio, at The Metropolitan Museum of Art in New York. His list of collaborators included Tim Hecker, Hildur Guðnadóttir, Pan Sonic, Can drummer Jaki Liebezeit, Marc Almond, Barry Adamson, and Stephen O'Malley of Sunn O))). In 1999, Jóhann founded the Apparat Organ Quartet, which has released two albums since 2002 with live performances in Europe, America and Japan.

== Personal life ==
Jóhann left Reykjavík in the early 2000s, living in Copenhagen before settling in Kreuzberg, Berlin. He had a daughter, Karolina Jóhannsdóttir, who lives in Copenhagen.

Jóhann died in Berlin on 9 February 2018 at the age of 48. He died of heart failure, with German media stating that the toxicology report indicated that a lethal combination of cocaine and flu medication was the likely cause of his death.

== Discography ==
=== Solo albums ===
- Englabörn (2002, Touch)
  - Englabörn (re-issue) (2007, 4AD)
- Virðulegu Forsetar (2004, Touch)
- IBM 1401, A User's Manual (2006, 12 Tónar, 4AD)
- Fordlandia (2008, 4AD)
- And in the Endless Pause There Came the Sound of Bees (2009, 12 Tónar, NTOV)
- End of Summer (2015, Sonic Pieces) – in collaboration with Hildur Guðnadóttir & Robert Aiki Aubrey Lowe
- Orphée (2016, Deutsche Grammophon)
- Englabörn & Variations (2018, Deutsche Grammophon) (Englabörn reissue)
- 12 Conversations With Thilo Heinzmann (2019, Deutsche Grammophon) – recorded by Echo Collective
- Gold Dust (2021)
- Drone Mass (2022)

=== Film score albums ===
- Dís (2004, 12 Tónar, in Iceland; 2005, The Worker's Institute, in the US)
- Personal Effects (2009, Deutsche Grammophon)
- The Miners' Hymns (2011, 12 Tónar, FatCat)
- Free The Mind (2012, NTOV)
- Copenhagen Dreams (2012, 12 Tónar)
- Prisoners (2013, WaterTower Music)
- McCanick by John C. Waller (2014, Milan Records)
- I Am Here (with B.J. Nilsen) (2014, Ash International)
- The Theory of Everything (2014, Back Lot Music)
- Sicario (2015, Varèse Sarabande)
- Arrival (2016, Deutsche Grammophon)
- The Mercy (2018, Deutsche Grammophon)
- Mary Magdalene (2018, Milan Records)
- Mandy (2018, Lakeshore/Invada)
- Last and First Men (2020, Deutsche Grammophon)
- Blind Massage (with Jonas Colstrup) (2022, Soundtrack Magazine)
- The Shadow Play (with Jonas Colstrup) (2022, Soundtrack Magazine)

=== Singles ===
- "The Sun's Gone Dim and the Sky's Turned Black" (2006, 4AD)

=== Artworks ===
- Ashes and Snow (Gregory Colbert, 2002)

=== Plays ===
- Margrét Mikla by Kristín Ómarsdóttir (1996, Icelandic Take-away Theatre)
- Vitleysingarnir by Ólafur Haukur Símonarsson (2000, Hafnarfjördur Theater)
- Fireface by Marius Von Mayerberg (2000, RÚV)
- Englabörn by Hávar Sigurjónsson (2001, Hafnarfjördur Theater)
- Kryddlegin Hjörtu by Laura Esquivel (2002, Borgarleikhús)
- Viktoría og Georg by Ólafur Haukur Símonarsson (2002, Icelandic National Theatre)
- Pabbastrákur by Hávar Sigurjónsson (2003, Icelandic National Theatre)
- Jón Gabríel Borkman by Henrik Ibsen (2004, Icelandic National Theatre)
- Dínamít by Birgir Sigurðsson (2005, Icelandic National Theatre)
- Døden i Teben by Sophocles/Jon Fosse (2008, Det Norske Teatret)
- Ganesh versus the Third Reich by Back to Back Theatre (2011, Back to Back Theatre)

=== Contemporary dance ===
- IBM 1401, a User's Manual with Erna Ómarsdóttir (2002)
- Mysteries of Love with Erna Ómarsdóttir (2005)

== Filmography ==
=== Films ===
Year	Title	Director	Notes
2000	The Icelandic Dream	Róbert Ingi Douglas	
2000	Óskabörn þjóðarinnar	Jóhann Sigmarsson	
2002	A Man Like Me	Róbert Ingi Douglas	
2004	Dís	Silja Hauksdóttir	
2006	Thicker than Water	Árni Óli Ásgeirsson	
2008	Personal Effects	David Hollander	
2010	By Day and by Night	Alejandro Molina	
2010	Dreams in Copenhagen	Max Kestner	
2011	The Miners' Hymns	Bill Morrison	
2011	The Good Life	Eva Mulvad	
2012	For Ellen	So Yong Kim	
2012	Mystery	Lou Ye	1st collaboration with Ye
2013	McCanick	John C. Waller	
2013	Prisoners	Denis Villeneuve	1st collaboration with Villeneuve
2014	The 11th Hour	Anders Morgenthaler	with B. J. Nilsen
2014	Blind Massage	Lou Ye	with Jonas Colstrup
2014	The Theory of Everything	James Marsh	nominated for an Academy Award for Best Original Score
2015	Sicario	Denis Villeneuve	nominated for an Academy Award for Best Original Score
2016	Lovesong	So Yong Kim	
2016	Arrival	Denis Villeneuve	
2017	Mother!	Darren Aronofsky	Unused
2017	Blade Runner 2049	Denis Villeneuve	Unused
2018	Mandy	Panos Cosmatos	Posthumous release
2018	The Mercy	James Marsh	
2018	Mary Magdalene	Garth Davis	with Hildur Guðnadóttir; posthumous release
2018	Christopher Robin	Marc Forster	Unused; incomplete at time of death, Replaced by Geoff Zanelli & Jon Brion
2018	The Shadow Play	Lou Ye	with Jonas Colstrup; posthumous release
2020	Last and First Men	Jóhann Jóhannsson	with Yair Elazar Glotman; posthumous release

=== Documentaries ===
Year	Title	Director	Notes
2012	Free the Mind	Phie Ambo	
2012	White Black Boy	Camilla Magid	

=== Short films ===
Year	Title	Director	Notes
2003	Keepsake	Tim Shore	
2008	Varmints	Marc Craste	
2011	Junk Love	Nikolaj Feifer	
2015	End of Summer	Jóhann Jóhannsson	

=== Television ===
Year	Title	Network	Notes
1999	Corpus Camera	Stöð 2	
2000	Leyndardómar Íslenskra Skrímsla	Sjónvarpið	
2000	Erró- Norður, suður, austur, vestur	Stöð 2	
2007	Svartir Englar		
2015	Trapped	RÚV	with Hildur Gudnadóttir and Rutger Hoedemaekers
2016	The OA	Netflix	
2017	The Handmaid's Tale "Faithful"	Hulu	

== See also ==
- List of ambient music artists
