= McCanick =

- Directed by: Josh C. Waller
- Written by: Daniel Noah
- Produced by: Ehud Bleiberg; David Morse; Josh C. Waller
- Starring: David Morse; Cory Monteith; Mike Vogel; Ciarán Hinds
- Cinematography: Martin Ahlgren
- Edited by: Brett W. Bachman
- Music by: Jóhann Jóhannsson
- Production company: Bleiberg Entertainment
- Distributed by: Eagle Films
- Release dates: September 9, 2013 (TIFF); March 21, 2014
- Running time: 96 minutes
- Country: United States
- Language: English

McCanick is a 2013 American crime-drama mystery film directed by Josh C. Waller, written by Daniel Noah, and starring David Morse, Mike Vogel, Trevor Morgan, Ciarán Hinds, and Cory Monteith. This was one of Monteith's final feature film roles along with All the Wrong Reasons - both films were released at the 2013 Toronto International Film Festival a few weeks after his death. McCanick had its theatrical release on March 21, 2014. Critics responded negatively to the film's derivative, cliché-filled plot and direction but were positive towards both Morse and Monteith for their performances.

== Synopsis ==
Eugene "Mack" McCanick (David Morse) is a detective who, along with partner Floyd Intrator (Mike Vogel), hunts down a young criminal named Simon Weeks (Cory Monteith) who was just released from prison.

== Cast ==
- David Morse as Eugene "Mack" McCanick
- Cory Monteith as Simon Weeks
- Mike Vogel as Floyd Intrator
- Rachel Nichols as Amy Intrator
- Trevor Morgan as Louis
- Aaron Yoo as Carl
- Tracie Thoms as Sister Alice
- Ciarán Hinds as Quinn

== Production ==
Filming began taking place in Philadelphia in September 2012.

== Critical reception ==
McCanick garnered a negative reception since its release, holding a 13% approval rating on review aggregator Rotten Tomatoes based on 16 reviews, with an average rating of 3.9/10.

Steve Pulaski of Influx Magazine gave the film a middling "C−" grade, saying that Waller's direction was needless in providing the action crime style necessary for Noah's script, calling it "a foul-mouthed action film that will either serve as basic entertainment for some or no entertainment for others." Paste contributor Geoff Berkshire criticized Noah and Waller's "narrative contortions" from keeping viewers invested in Morse's title character and the plot coming across like a "woefully thin" rip-off of The French Connection, saying "this initially rote and ultimately ridiculous cop-on-the-edge drama suffers from too many creative missteps." Justin Lowe from The Hollywood Reporter also found criticism in the storytelling and filmmaking, writing that Noah "recycles predictable narrative elements [almost] to the point of meaningless and [then] substitutes wildly improbable developments in place of actual originality" and Waller's directing style "drain most of the drama from key scenes." Matt Zoller Seitz from RogerEbert.com credited Waller and cinematographer Martin Ahlgren for giving the film "a suitably unsettling look" but found the production and scripting "shallow, derivative" overall, concluding that it "barely has a frame it can claim as its own. It shambles in the shadows of similar but richer films, and never hits its own stride."

Morse and Monteith garnered praise for their respective performances. Berkshire gave credit to Monteith's "against-type" performance for delivering "tough and vulnerable in all the right ways," while Seitz said that Morse "lends the material more dignity and heft than it deserves". Jordan Hoffman, writing for the New York Daily News, gave praise to both Morse and Monteith's performances but said, "[I]t's a shame the script doesn't offer anything beyond loose-cannon-cop cliches." The New York Times' Neil Genzlinger said the film would've been a bit better with more appearances from Monteith's character than Morse's, despite being in a plot filled with "cop movie clichés" and confusing its take on 'show, don't tell' as "cryptically suspenseful". Variety's Andrew Barker also lauded praise to Monteith for giving a "very solid, professional" delivery of a "basic, straightforward" role and highlighted both Hinds and Morse's performances as well, but criticized the film overall for being a "drably derivative, infuriatingly improbable police drama." Paul MacInnes of The Guardian wrote, "[Cory] Monteith's final onscreen performance has grabbed all the attention, but this solid cop thriller has its own impressive lead in David Morse".
