= Matthew Wood (sound editor) =

American sound editor and voice actor

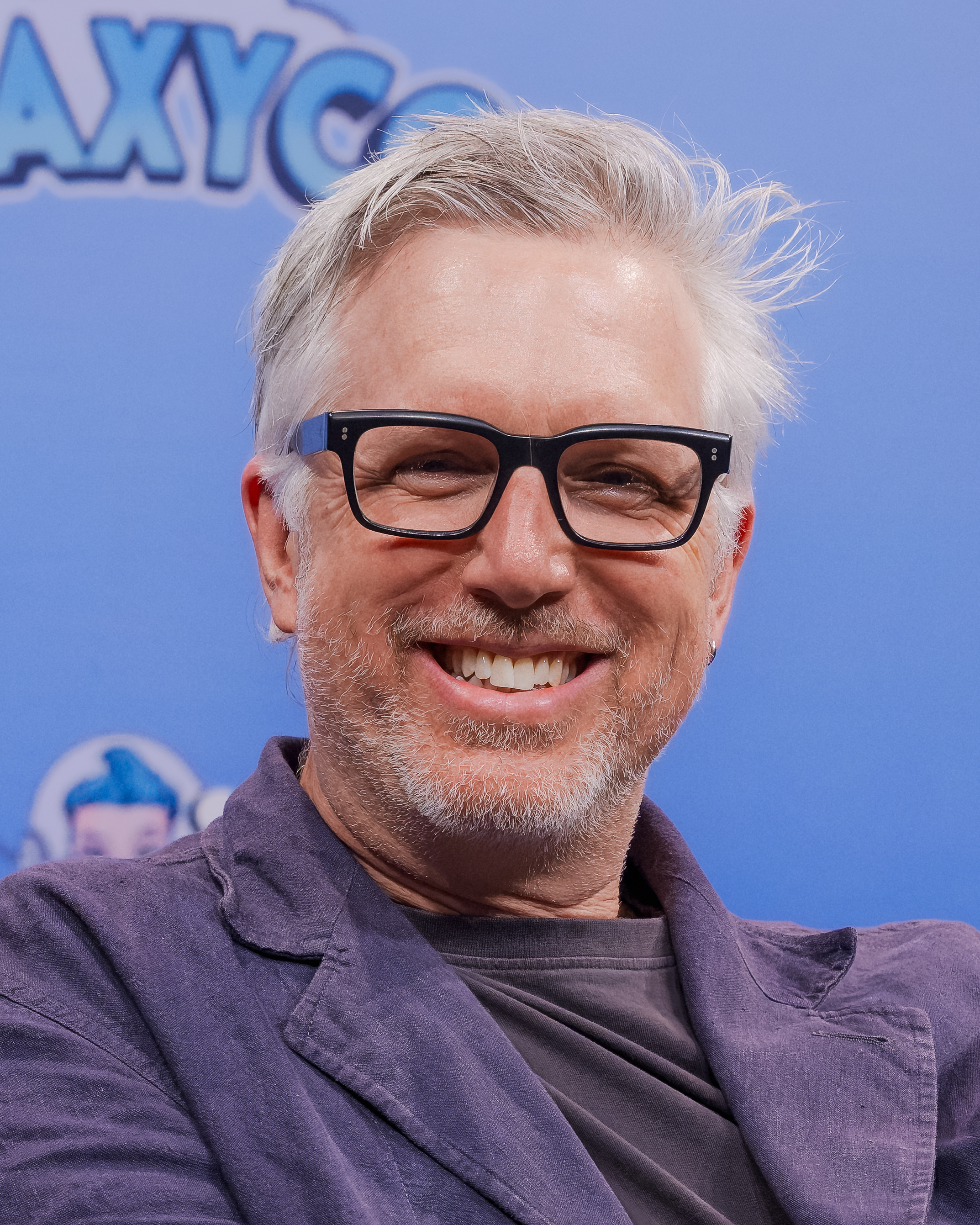
- Wood in 2026
- Born: Matthew Wood
- Occupations: Sound engineer, voice actor
- Years active: 1990–present

Matthew Wood is an American sound editor and occasional actor and voice actor. He is a supervising sound editor at Skywalker Sound in Marin County, California. He also provides the voice of General Grievous in the Star Wars franchise.

== Career ==
Starting at Lucasfilm as a game tester at LucasArts, Wood then moved to the company's sound department and worked on all three films of the Star Wars prequel trilogy as supervising sound editor and also did an uncredited acting role in The Phantom Menace as Bib Fortuna and the voice of Ody Mandrell. In Attack of the Clones, he played Seboca and Magaloof. In Star Wars: Episode III – Revenge of the Sith, in addition to a brief appearance as Orn Free Taa, Wood plays the voice role of General Grievous, a role originated by voice actors John DiMaggio and Richard McGonagle in the series Star Wars: Clone Wars. In the film, he dubbed the voice of stuntman Kyle Rowling, who played General Grievous utilizing motion capture.

He would later come back to work with the Star Wars expanded universe. He reprised his voice role of General Grievous in General Grievous Halloween audiocast as well as all video game appearances of Grievous with the exception of Star Wars Battlefront: Elite Squadron where Grievous was played by David W. Collins. He reprised his role as General Grievous and the battle droids in the Star Wars: The Clone Wars film and associated television series. In the series, he once again voiced Grievous as well as Wat Tambor, HELIOS-3D, senate guards, the battle droids and Poggle the Lesser. He provided the voice of RO-GR/Roger, a reprogrammed battle droid in Lego Star Wars: The Freemaker Adventures. He also voiced Bib Fortuna in Star Wars: The Bad Batch.

He has received five Academy Award nominations for Sound Editing: for Paul Thomas Anderson’s There Will Be Blood at the 80th Academy Awards, for the Pixar sci-fi film WALL-E at the 81st Academy Awards, for Star Wars: The Force Awakens at the 88th Academy Awards, for Star Wars: The Last Jedi at the 90th Academy Awards, and for Star Wars: The Rise of Skywalker at the 92nd Academy Awards.

Wood made an appearance in Adult Swim's Robot Chicken in 2008. He voiced H.E.R.B.I.E. in The Fantastic Four: First Steps (2025).

== Filmography ==
=== Sound editing ===
Year	Title	Notes
1996	The Rock	Assistant sound designer
1998	Armageddon	Assistant sound designer
2000	Titan A.E.	Supervising sound editor
2005	Star Wars: Episode III – Revenge of the Sith	
2007	There Will Be Blood	Nominated – Academy Award for Best Sound Editing
2008	Star Wars: The Clone Wars	
2008	WALL-E	Nominated – Academy Award for Best Sound Editing
2009	Star Trek	
2011	Star Wars: Episode IV – A New Hope	Remastered sound for Blu-ray release
2011	Star Wars: Episode V – The Empire Strikes Back	Remastered sound for Blu-ray release
2011	Star Wars: Episode VI – Return of the Jedi	Remastered sound for Blu-ray release
2011	Super 8	
2012	The Master	
2015	Star Wars: The Force Awakens	Nominated – Academy Award for Best Sound Editing
2016	Rogue One	
2017	Star Wars: The Last Jedi	Nominated – Academy Award for Best Sound Editing
2018	Solo: A Star Wars Story	
2019	Star Wars: The Rise of Skywalker	Nominated – Academy Award for Best Sound Editing

=== Voice acting ===
Although Wood does not usually work as an actor he has provided voice over performances in multiple Star Wars media(most notably as General Grievous). He also made on camera acting as an extra, including portraying Bib Fortuna in 2 live action Star Wars projects.

==== Film ====
Year	Title	Role	Notes
1999	Star Wars: Episode I – The Phantom Menace	Bib Fortuna, Ody Mandrell	Uncredited
2002	Star Wars: Episode II – Attack of the Clones	Magaloof, Seboca	Uncredited
2005	Star Wars: Episode III – Revenge of the Sith	General Grievous	
2008	Star Wars: The Clone Wars	Battle Droids	
2013	Star Trek Into Darkness	Additional Voices	
2015	Star Wars: The Force Awakens	Ello Asty, Quiggold, Niima Thug, Stormtroopers	Uncredited
2017	Smurfs: The Lost Village	Additional Voices	
2017	The Emoji Movie	Additional Voices	
2017	Olaf's Frozen Adventure	Additional Voices	Short film
2018	Next Gen	Additional Voices	Netflix film
2019	Knives Out	Additional Voices	
2019	Star Wars: The Rise of Skywalker	C'ai Threnalli	
2021	Seal Team	Shark, Seal	Netflix film
2023	Ant-Man and the Wasp: Quantumania	Quantumnauts (voice)	
2025	The Fantastic Four: First Steps	H.E.R.B.I.E. (voice)	
2026	Avengers: Doomsday	H.E.R.B.I.E. (voice)	

==== Television ====
Year	Title	Role	Notes
2008	Robot Chicken	Pooka, Fygar, Teacher	Episode: "President Evil"
2008–20	Star Wars: The Clone Wars	General Grievous, Wat Tambor, Poggle the Lesser, Battle Droids, others	69 episodes
2014–18	Star Wars Rebels	B1-268, Klik-Klak, Stormtrooper, Battle Droids	13 episodes
2016–17	Lego Star Wars: The Freemaker Adventures	Roger, IG-86, Additional Voices	31 episodes
2018	Star Wars Forces of Destiny	IG-88	Episode: "Triplecross"
2018–20	Star Wars Resistance	Ello Asty, Kylo Ren, Additional Voices	6 episodes
2020	The Mandalorian	Bib Fortuna	Episode: "Chapter 16: The Rescue"
2021	Star Wars: The Bad Batch	Bib Fortuna, Battle Droids	3 episodes
2021–24	What If...?	Additional Voices	23 episodes
2021, 2023	Star Wars: Visions	Battle Droids, Stormtroopers	Episodes: "The Village Bride" (English dub) and "The Pit"
2022	The Book of Boba Fett	Bib Fortuna	Episode: "Chapter 4: The Gathering Storm"
2022	Willow	Additional Voices	Recurring role
2024	Star Wars: Tales of the Empire	General Grievous	Episode: "The Path of Fear"

==== Video games ====
Year	Title	Role
2005	Star Wars: Episode III – Revenge of the Sith	General Grievous
2005	Star Wars: Battlefront II	General Grievous
2008	Star Wars: The Clone Wars – Lightsaber Duels	Battle Droids
2009	Star Wars: The Clone Wars – Republic Heroes	Battle Droids
2009	Brütal Legend	Fire Barons
2010	Clone Wars Adventures	General Grievous, Wat Tambor, Poggle the Lesser, Battle Droids, Additional Voices
2011	Lego Star Wars III: The Clone Wars	General Grievous, Battle Droids
2012	Kinect Star Wars	General Grievous, Red 13, B1 Droid, B1 Trando, B2 Droid
2015	Disney Infinity 3.0	General Grievous, Battle Droids
2016	Lego Star Wars: The Force Awakens	General Grievous, Ello Asty, Quiggold
2017	Star Wars Battlefront II	General Grievous, Kylo Ren (Masked), Battle Droids
2020	Star Wars: Tales from the Galaxy's Edge	Mubo
2022	Lego Star Wars: The Skywalker Saga	General Grievous, Kylo Ren, Battle Droids
