= Cad Bane =

Character appearing in the Star Wars franchise

- Star Wars character
- Cad Bane's animated and live-action depictions from The Bad Batch (left) and The Book of Boba Fett (right)
- First appearance: "Hostage Crisis"; The Clone Wars; (2009)
- Created by: George Lucas; Dave Filoni; Henry Gilroy
- Voiced by: Corey Burton; A. J. LoCascio (young)
- Portrayed by: Dorian Kingi (The Book of Boba Fett)

In-universe information
- Full name: Cad Bane; Colby (birth name)
- Species: Duros
- Gender: Male
- Occupation: Bounty hunter
- Affiliation: List of employers: Sith Order; Confederacy of Independent Systems; Hutt Clan; Kaminoan government; Galactic Empire; Pyke Syndicate
- Significant other: Arin
- Children: Isaac (son)
- Partner: Todo 360; Aurra Sing
- Mentor: Lazlo; Jango Fett
- Apprentice: Boba Fett
- Homeworld: Duro

Cad Bane is a character in the Star Wars franchise. Created by George Lucas, Dave Filoni and Henry Gilroy, he first appeared as a recurring antagonist in the animated series Star Wars: The Clone Wars (voiced by Corey Burton). Burton would return to voice the character in the animated series Star Wars: The Bad Batch and Tales of the Underworld, as well as the live-action series The Book of Boba Fett (in which Bane is physically portrayed by stuntman Dorian Kingi) on Disney+.

Cad Bane is a ruthless bounty hunter and mercenary from the planet Duro who is known for his trademark wide-brimmed hat. His fast draw, cunning wits, and unscrupulous willingness to take any job for the right price earn him a reputation as one of the best bounty hunters in the galaxy. Often employed by other antagonists, Bane comes into conflict with the Jedi of the Galactic Republic numerous times during the Clone Wars. Through the reign of the Galactic Empire to the era of the New Republic, Bane retains his notoriety and continues to provide his services to the highest bidder, causing him to clash with Clone Force 99, Fennec Shand, Cobb Vanth, and even his former apprentice, Boba Fett.

The character has become a fan favorite villain since his introduction and is considered one of the most popular bounty hunters in the franchise, on par with Boba and Jango Fett. In addition to the television series, Cad Bane has also been featured in various Star Wars comic books and video games.

== Development ==
=== Creation ===
"Cad Bane is a new bounty hunter. He has to be instantly effective, kind of on the level that I always wanted to see Boba Fett work on in the old, classic [Star Wars] trilogy. We knew that [Bane] was going to be a very intense fighter, a very intense gunslinger, and a very serious threat. Cad Bane works for the highest bidder and, I think, he enjoys what he does."

— Dave Filoni, supervising director of The Clone Wars, on Cad Bane's debut

Cad Bane was created to serve as a recurring antagonist in The Clone Wars. Writers Dave Filoni and Henry Gilroy originally planned to adapt the bounty hunter Durge, who was introduced in the 2003 Clone Wars micro-series, as a human character but Star Wars creator George Lucas instead suggested the creation of an entirely new bounty hunter with a Western design. The result was inspired by Western film actors such as Lee Van Cleef's portrayals of Angel Eyes in The Good, The Bad, and the Ugly and Colonel Mortimer in For a Few Dollars More, while retaining the features of the Duros species in the Star Wars universe. Corey Burton's vocal performance, inspired by the voices of actors Lance Henriksen (who was originally envisioned to voice Bane) and Peter Lorre, was then digitally modified by the series' sound production team. While Filoni researched the character, he happened across unused concept art from the original trilogy of a gun-toting bounty hunter with a wide-brimmed hat that helped determine the character’s final look. Filoni speculated on George Lucas' original idea for the character that became Cad Bane: "Something you notice about George Lucas after a while is that he'll mention a name like 'Mace Windu' in a [1973] version of Star Wars, and then it pops up in 1999. So, this, I guess might have been an idea George had for the character Cad Bane way back when, and now finally he's getting around to bringing him to the screen in The Clone Wars."

Cad Bane made his debut in the season one finale, "Hostage Crisis". Giancarlo Volpe, the director of the episode, has compared Bane to bounty hunter Boba Fett: "The crew loves Cad Bane and I really think the fans will, too. He brings a serious bad-ass sensibility to Star Wars. He's a lethal and ruthless bounty hunter and you see that right away in the episode. Unlike Boba Fett, Cad doesn't take prisoners."

=== Characterization ===
The official Star Wars Databank describes Cad Bane as "a ruthless bounty hunter" and "the preeminent blaster-for-hire in the galaxy". He is cold, cruel, calculating, selfish, and wholly willing to "track his prey to the ends of the galaxy" for the right price. During the opening ceremony of a bounty hunting tournament, Count Dooku goes so far as to state that Bane "needs no introduction". Bane cares little for the sinister motives of his employers such as Darth Sidious, and has no qualms about harming and murdering innocents and even children in pursuit of his quarry. Examples of his sadistic tendencies include his brutal torture and execution of Jedi Master Bolla Ropal, as well as his willingness to kill another bounty hunter simply for having a hat that he liked. Bane's lack of morality, disregard for collateral damage, and staunch belief in only looking out for himself earn him a reputation as one of the galaxy's most notorious mercenaries, which often puts him into conflict with more honorable hunters, such as Boba Fett. Although he considers compassion for others to be a liability, Bane is not entirely without a code of honor; he saves Rako Hardeen (actually Obi-Wan Kenobi in disguise) when Moralo Eval tries to drop him into a fire pit, telling Eval to kill Hardeen like a man instead of at the push of a button.

As a Duros, Bane has blue skin, red eyes, and a tall and slim frame. He often wears a wide-brimmed hat and has a habit of chewing on toothpicks. Although his species lacks great physical strength, Bane is a very wily individual and possesses a brilliant strategic mind, demonstrated in both his meticulous preparation for missions and his ability to spontaneously improvise when things do not go according to plan. He is frequently able to outsmart his enemies, including the Jedi and other criminals, and has proven capable of leading team efforts in spite of his preference for working alone.

Bane is renowned as one of the galaxy's fastest and most skilled marksmen and gunslingers. His primary weapons are a pair of LL-30 blaster pistols, which he has used with exceptional speed and proficiency in quick draw duels to best the likes of Hunter, Cobb Vanth, and Boba Fett. Bane's outfit is integrated with an arsenal of deadly weaponry and paraphernalia specifically designed to counter the abilities of the Jedi. His breathing tube apparatus prevents him from being Force-choked and his rocket boots allow him to outpace Force-imbued Jedi in combat. Each of his vambraces is equipped with a grappling hook launcher, a knockout gas dispenser, a flamethrower, an electric stunner, and various remote control devices. Bane also carries bolas and explosives.

== Appearances ==
=== Television ===
==== The Clone Wars ====
Introduced in the season one finale, Cad Bane leads a group of bounty hunters in infiltrating the Senate building on Coruscant and holding a group of Republic senators hostage to demand the release of Ziro the Hutt. Bane's plan proves successful and the bounty hunters escape with Ziro in spite of Anakin Skywalker's attempt to stop them.

Bane makes his first chronological appearance in the season two premiere, in which he is hired by Darth Sidious to steal a Holocron from the Jedi Temple. After obtaining the Holocron and killing Jedi Master Bolla Ropal, Bane is given command of a Separatist fleet and subdues Ahsoka Tano in the ensuing space battle, using her as leverage to force Anakin to unlock the Holocron. Bane is asked by Sidious to use its information to find and kidnap several Force-sensitive younglings. Despite being captured by the Jedi and forced to take them to the Holocron, Bane leads Obi-Wan Kenobi and Mace Windu into a trap and manages to escape.

Season three details the events prior to and following Bane's takeover of the Senate building in season one. Jabba the Hutt hires Bane to free Ziro as he possesses incriminating information about the Hutt crime families. Bane captures the droids C-3PO and R2-D2 to attain the schematics for the Senate building. Shortly after the mission's success, Ziro escapes from Jabba's clutches and Bane is rehired to hunt down the rogue Hutt. Bane finds Ziro's corpse on Teth, where he engages Obi-Wan and Quinlan Vos before fleeing.

In season four, Bane is hired by Count Dooku to infiltrate a Republic prison to free Moralo Eval. Bane grows suspicious of a bounty hunter named Rako Hardeen, who is actually Obi-Wan disguised to gain Eval's trust and uncover Dooku's plans. Following a successful prison break, the trio are pursued by Anakin and Ahsoka before finally reaching Serenno. Bane, Hardeen and a group of other bounty hunters participate in a tournament to complete an obstacle course called "The Box" for a part in a Separatist plot to kidnap Supreme Chancellor Palpatine. After the tournament, Bane supplants Eval as the leader of the operation and the surviving bounty hunters kidnap Palpatine on Naboo during the Festival of Lights. However, Obi-Wan's deception as Hardeen is revealed and he manages to foil the plot, leading to Bane's reapprehension.

Following the series' cancellation in 2014, supervising director Dave Filoni confirmed that Bane was slated to return in a story arc which saw him mentoring a young Boba Fett, helping him to follow in the footsteps of his late father, Jango Fett, who had mentored Bane. Among the arc was a clip where the two hunters teaming up on a "rescue mission" on Tatooine where Tusken Raiders had kidnapped a child and emphasized Boba's and Cad's relation to one another as Cad had known Jango. Another clip showed an assassination attempt on Mace Windu where Anakin Skywalker chases the two but fight Boba Fett. The end of the arc would see Bane and Fett having a standoff, which ended with them both being shot in the head.

==== The Bad Batch ====
Following the rise of the Galactic Empire, Cad Bane continues to operate as a bounty hunter and is hired by Prime Minister Lama Su to retrieve the unaltered clone Omega, who escaped from Kamino with a group of elite clone troopers called Clone Force 99. On Bracca, Bane intercepts and kills a squad of Imperial clones before besting Hunter in a duel and kidnapping Omega. Bane takes Omega to an abandoned Kaminoan cloning facility on Bora Vio for her delivery, but she escapes when Fennec Shand intervenes. Following a brief scuffle with Shand, Bane attempts to pursue Omega and Clone Force 99 only to discover that Shand sabotaged his ship, leaving him stranded.

Bane also continued his lucrative business with the Empire by kidnapping Force-sensitive targets, who were usually young children or even babies, and delivering them to Imperial representatives at a space station over Coruscant.

==== The Book of Boba Fett ====
Five years after the fall of the Galactic Empire, Cad Bane is hired by the Pyke Syndicate to aid in their takeover of Tatooine. He arrives in Freetown on behalf of the Pykes to order the town to remain neutral in the upcoming war with Boba Fett. Bane bests Marshal Cobb Vanth and his deputy in a duel when they reach for their blasters, and declares that Freetown will be left alone so long as the Pykes' spice trade continues unimpeded. Bane leads the Pykes' attack on Mos Espa and wins in a duel against Fett, but Fett overpowers and stabs him with a Tusken gaffi stick, leaving a light on Bane's chest blinking red.

==== Tales of the Underworld ====
Cad Bane's origins are depicted in the anthology miniseries Tales of the Underworld. In the episode "The Good Life", it is revealed his real name was Colby. He grew up with his friend Niro on the streets of Duro. After being recruited by gang leader Lazlo, the two are separated during a robbery when Niro gets arrested by the police. In the episode "A Good Turn", an adult Cad Bane travels to Duro after learning Lazlo was killed by the Marshall. He reunites with Niro, who's now a deputy. Bane warns him to stay out of his way. Bane lures out the Marshall by starting a fire and kills him in a duel. Arin, his girlfriend, convinces him to surrender. In the episode, "One Good Deed", Niro, now a Marshall, learns that Bane was released from prison on Torano on a technicality and is en route to Duro. Niro, against the council's wishes, decides to confront Bane. During the duel, Bane learns that Niro and Arin, who was pregnant with Bane's child at the time of his arrest, got married, but she died years before Bane's released. Bane kills Niro in front of Isaac, his biological child, and leaves Duro after realizing the truth.

=== Comics ===
Bane also appears in the five-part Marvel Comics comic book miniseries Star Wars: Darth Maul, set before the events of the prequel trilogy, where he aides the titular character in kidnapping a Jedi Padawan. Star Wars: Darth Maul issue #2 is his first appearance in comics.

=== Legends ===
In April 2014, most of the licensed Star Wars novels and comics produced since the originating 1977 film Star Wars were rebranded as Star Wars Legends and declared non-canon to the rest of the franchise by Lucasfilm. Cad Bane has appeared in several comics and video games set in the Legends continuity.

== Promotion ==
Cad Bane has been featured in two Hasbro toys concerning himself, his blaster and his ship, as well as one involving him merged with his ship in a crossover for Transformers. Both Cad Bane and his speeder were included as part of the Lego Star Wars toy line.

== Appearance and reception ==
Cad Bane's appearance in The Book of Boba Fett, and elsewhere, has been the subject of critical commentary

In 2009, UGO Networks ran a feature on Cad Bane, noting his cool looks and calling him "quintessentially cold, cruel and calculating". IGN listed him as the 31st top Star Wars character, praising his first impression and saying his creators succeeded in introducing "an inarguably cool and effective villain". IGN also noted he "continued to be an excellent foil" to the main protagonists in his later appearances. IGN's Eric Goldman said that Bane was a successful attempt at creating a new ongoing villain, and later called him a "very cool and effective new villain". Goldman also called Bane's introduction and his torture of Bolla Ropal (a Jedi) two of The Clone Wars's darkest moments, adding that Bane lived up to the hype that surrounded him in his introduction. Christian Bauvelt, writing for Entertainment Weekly's PopWatch, said that one of the three top reasons the "Evil Plans" episode worked for him was because Cad Bane appeared in it, and noted Bane's similarities to Angel Eyes from The Good, the Bad and the Ugly.

The character's appearance in The Book of Boba Fett has been positively reviewed by reviewers, who argue that it gave the series a singular villain. However, Murray Ferguson of Screen Rant argues that the character's physical appearance (including a higher mouth and added chin) represents a decline in quality from Bane's animated appearances. Meanwhile, The A.V. Club's Nick Wanserski stated that the character looks "reasonably good", but some elements "worked better in animation." However, his appearance was praised by Sean Clean of CNET, who called his appearance "terrifying" and compared it to Lee Van Cleef's character Angel Eyes in The Good, the Bad and the Ugly. Similar to the fan edits of Luke Skywalker's appearance in The Mandalorian, a fan edited Bane's live-action appearance in an effort to make it closer to the animated version of the character following perceived audience criticisms of his appearance in live-action.
