= General Grievous =

Star Wars character

- Star Wars character
- General Grievous, as depicted in Revenge of the Sith (2005)
- First appearance: "Chapter 20"; Clone Wars; (2004)
- Created by: George Lucas
- Voiced by: Matthew Wood (Note: Revenge of the Sith, The Clone Wars, Tales of the Empire, and various video games); Other: John DiMaggio (Note: Star Wars: Clone Wars (season 2)); Richard McGonagle (Note: Star Wars: Clone Wars (season 3)); David W. Collins (Note: Star Wars Battlefront: Renegade Squadron and Star Wars Battlefront: Elite Squadron); Kirby Morrow (Note: Lego Star Wars: The Yoda Chronicles and Lego Star Wars: Droid Tales)

In-universe information
- Full name: Qymaen jai Sheelal
- Species: Kaleesh cyborg
- Gender: Male
- Title: Supreme Martial Commander of the Separatist Droid Armies
- Occupation: Warlord; Military commander; Head of State of the CIS (Note: Confederacy of Independent Systems) (ephemeral); Jedi hunter
- Affiliation: CIS
- Home: Kalee
- Master: Count Dooku (lightsaber combat)
- Apprentice: IG-100 MagnaGuards (melee combat)

General Grievous is a character in the Star Wars franchise created by George Lucas. He was introduced in the 2003 animated series Star Wars: Clone Wars (voiced by John DiMaggio in the second season and Richard McGonagle in the third season), before appearing through computer-generated imagery in the 2005 live-action film Star Wars: Episode III – Revenge of the Sith (voiced by Matthew Wood). Wood reprised the role in the 2008 animated series Star Wars: The Clone Wars and the 2024 anthology series Tales of the Empire.

Grievous is depicted as a brilliant military strategist who serves as the Supreme Commander of the Confederacy of Independent Systems' Droid Armies during the Clone Wars. He is a powerful Kaleesh cyborg who has mastered all forms of lightsaber combat, under the tutelage of Count Dooku, to rival the Force abilities of the Jedi of the Galactic Republic. Grievous harbors an intense hatred of the Jedi, and gains a reputation as a feared and ruthless Jedi hunter who collects the lightsabers of his fallen victims as trophies. He develops a rivalry with Jedi Master Obi-Wan Kenobi, whom he clashes with several times during the war, and is killed by Kenobi during their final confrontation in Revenge of the Sith.

Entertainment publications described Grievous as among the franchise's most iconic villains, and his popularity within the Star Wars fandom has earned him a cult following. The character has also appeared in several forms of non-canonical media in the Star Wars Expanded Universe, including novels, comic books, and video games. Some of these works explore his past as Qymaen jai Sheelal, a reptilian warlord whose vendetta against the Jedi began when he blamed them for the plight of his people. A ship crash secretly orchestrated by Dooku mortally wounds Grievous and leads to his reconstruction as a cyborg. This origin story was retroactively altered in The Clone Wars, in which it is implied that Grievous willingly augmented his body with cybernetic enhancements to rival the Jedi, although several elements of his original backstory were later reintegrated into the Star Wars canon.

== Development ==
=== Creation and casting ===
All of these [Star Wars] films have the ultimate "bad guy," which is the Emperor, but in addition to that there's the sidekick; being Darth Vader in Episodes IV, V and VI, Darth Maul in Episode I, or Count Dooku in Episode II. So we're always trying to work with a sidekick, an apprentice to the Dark Lord. I came up with the idea of General Grievous as the leader of the Droid Armies. He's an alien in a droid shell, which is sort of an echo of what Anakin is going to become.

— George Lucas

In 2002, George Lucas conceived of General Grievous as a powerful new villain for Revenge of the Sith, specifically envisioning the character as a cyborg droid general to reflect and foreshadow Anakin Skywalker's transformation into Darth Vader at the end of the film. The only instruction Lucas gave his art department was to make the character "iconic" and "scary." Numerous illustrations were developed at Lucasfilm, some purely mechanical and others more alien-like in appearance. One drawing presented Grievous as an eight-year-old alien child on a hover chair guarded by two IG assassin droids, which Lucas rejected for not being threatening enough. Another rejected robotic design was ultimately used for Grievous' IG-100 MagnaGuards in the film.

Two weeks after Lucas' instruction to design Grievous, a sketch made by concept artist Warren Fu was chosen and developed by Lucas for the character's finalized appearance. Fu stated the design for Grievous's face was an amalgamation of Michael Myers, The Crow, and Shrunken Heads, with the ears being modeled after Jabba’s skiff. Fu's sketch was made into a 1-foot (30 cm)-tall maquette sculpture which was then refined into a realistic computer-generated model by Industrial Light & Magic (ILM). This was one of the most complex models ever created by ILM at the time as many of its components were of differing physical qualities. Comparisons have been drawn between Grievous' appearance and Jacob Epstein's sculpture Rock Drill.

In the lead-up to Revenge of the Sith, Grievous made his first ever appearance in the season two finale of Clone Wars. The character's voice was provided by John DiMaggio. Grievous would return in a more prominent capacity in the third and final season, with Richard McGonagle replacing DiMaggio in the role.

Numerous actors auditioned for the role of Grievous in Revenge of the Sith. Lucas wanted Grievous to sound as if he was speaking through a cybernetic voice box. So, every audition was put through the same computerized layer of processing by Matthew Wood, supervising sound editor at Skywalker Sound, to create a "synthesized timbre". Gary Oldman, a friend of producer Rick McCallum, was initially cast in the role and even completed some voice-over work. Oldman had to drop out of the production due to complications that arose from the rules of union filmmaking in Australia where the film was shot.

Having previously performed voices for other Star Wars projects, Wood took Lucas' feedback on the various auditions he modulated and submitted his own under the pseudonym Alan Smithee. Wood approached Grievous as a "classic villain" and used a gruff and harsh voice with an Eastern European accent for his performance. A "gravelly quality" was added to Wood's voice when it was processed. Lucas selected Wood for the role and, since Lucas had bronchitis at the time, he instructed Wood to give Grievous an asthmatic cough; this was intended to emphasize the character's organic nature as well as the flawed cyborg prosthetics of the Star Wars prequel trilogy (which would later be refined for Darth Vader in the original trilogy). Some of the audio effects for Grievous' cough in Revenge of the Sith were recorded by Lucas himself while he had bronchitis. Grievous was created entirely through CGI in the movie. During filming, Grievous' dialogue was read off-screen while Kyle Rowling wore a motion capture suit to perform the character's fight scenes with Obi-Wan Kenobi. Wood would subsequently reprise his role as the voice of Grievous in The Clone Wars animated series and numerous video games. During production of the series, Lucas briefly considered revealing that Grievous was actually a disguised Darth Maul (prior to Maul's official return in the third season).

=== Characterization ===
I tend to think of the episode "Lair of Grievous" as a look more into the mind of Grievous. How you interpret the story depends largely on what backstory you like. If you believe Grievous was shot down in a shuttle by Dooku and put back together, I think that story is there, it's just that Grievous has invented this new "story" of choosing his alterations. If you don't believe in the [Expanded Universe] version of the story or didn't like it, then perhaps this new revelation that Grievous was a warrior whose lust for power made him choose to be altered, suits you better.

— Dave Filoni

The official Star Wars Databank describes General Grievous as "a brilliant Separatist military strategist and a feared Jedi hunter". He is cruel, cunning, aggressive, murderous, and gains an infamous reputation for his ruthlessness during the Clone Wars. Grievous holds the title of Supreme Martial Commander of the Separatist Droid Armies, making him the absolute leader of the Confederacy of Independent Systems' military and the second highest-ranking member of the Separatist Alliance (after Count Dooku, the political Head of State). Although aligned with the Separatists, Grievous does not care for their political ideals and has professed that he only participates in the conflict to eliminate the Jedi. He harbors a deep-seated resentment of the Jedi and has a vast collection of lightsabers claimed from his many victims as war trophies. Grievous is also short-tempered and has little tolerance for failure or weakness, as he frequently lashes out against and destroys his own battle droids for their persisting incompetence.

Grievous' cyborg body was specifically designed to rival the abilities of the Jedi. Standing at 7 ft 1 in (216 cm), his imposing presence serves to instill fear in his opponents to give him a psychological advantage in battle. While he is not Force-sensitive, Grievous has been trained in all forms of lightsaber combat by Count Dooku. Each of his mechanical arms can separate in half, allowing him to wield four lightsabers at once to overwhelm his enemies. His cybernetic enhancements give him exceptional strength, speed and reflexes to outmaneuver Force-users and even the Force itself. In spite of Grievous' physical and acrobatic prowess, Dooku has advised him to retreat should he lose the elements of surprise and intimidation, and thus his advantage, in a fight against the Force-sensitive Jedi. Grievous often heeds his mentor's advice and becomes known as one of the Jedi's most elusive adversaries during the Clone Wars.

Grievous first appeared in Genndy Tartakovsky's Clone Wars before his character traits had been finalized for Revenge of the Sith. According to Tartakovsky, Lucas initially pitched Grievous to him as "this ruthless, totally capable Jedi killer," but later developed the character into "one of those old B-serial villains who does something bad ... twirls his mustache and then runs off." The series depicted Grievous as a nigh-unstoppable fighter capable of dispatching multiple Jedi simultaneously with ease, which contradicted the then-upcoming film's less powerful portrayal of the character. To reconcile these continuity differences, the series finale of Clone Wars sees Mace Windu crush Grievous' chestplate with the Force, damaging his internal organs and providing a reason for both his hacking cough and his weakened state in the film. However, The Clone Wars would later present Grievous with his cough throughout the entirety of its run.

There remain numerous accounts of Grievous' backstory. Literature in the Star Wars Expanded Universe written by Warren Fu, the original designer of Grievous, had the general's hatred of the Jedi stem from their role in the plight and enslavement of his people. A shuttle crash orchestrated by Dooku and pinned on the Jedi mortally wounds Grievous and leads to his reconstruction as a cyborg. The Clone Wars would later suggest that Grievous was denied the right to become a Jedi due to his lack of connection to the Force. Writers Dave Filoni and Henry Gilroy postulated that Grievous volunteered for cybernetic modifications to rival the Jedi that rejected him. In the series, Grievous' castle displays statues hinting at his gradual progression as a cyborg. Despite this, Filoni elected to keep Grievous' backstory ambiguous.

== Appearances ==
=== Film ===
==== Revenge of the Sith (2005) ====
During the Battle of Coruscant, General Grievous holds the kidnapped Supreme Chancellor Palpatine aboard his flagship, the Invisible Hand. (Note: As depicted in the 2008 animated television series Star Wars: The Clone Wars.) Obi-Wan Kenobi and Anakin Skywalker infiltrate Grievous' vessel to rescue Palpatine. After Anakin kills Count Dooku, Grievous traps the Jedi on the battle-torn ship and departs in an escape pod. Grievous succeeds Dooku as the Head of State of the Separatists and has his battle droids take the planet Utapau hostage. At Darth Sidious' request, he relocates the Separatist Council to the volcanic planet of Mustafar. Grievous is tracked to Utapau by Obi-Wan and the two engage in lightsaber combat while the Republic's clone troopers battle the droid armies. Before Grievous can kill him, Obi-Wan uses the Force to summon Grievous' own DT-57 blaster and shoot the organs housed within Grievous' chestplate, killing the cyborg general.

=== Television ===
==== The Clone Wars (2008–2014; 2020) ====
Grievous underwent a redesign in the final season of The Clone Wars to more closely resemble his appearance in Revenge of the Sith. This redesign would also be used in The Bad Batch and Tales of the Empire.

In the first season, Grievous encounters Obi-Wan for the first time when he uses the ion cannons of his flagship, the Malevolence, to attack the Republic fleet, but is forced to abandon ship when Anakin sends it crashing into a nearby moon. (Note: Dialogue in Star Wars: Episode III – Revenge of the Sith establishes that Grievous and Anakin are meeting for the first time. As a result, they never meet in The Clone Wars.) Grievous' subsequent plots include launching an attack on a Republic outpost on the Rishi moon, and using a listening station to uncover the Republic's military secrets, both of which are thwarted. In light of Grievous' defeats, Dooku arranges for Kit Fisto, Nahdar Vebb, and a group of clone troopers to infiltrate the general's hidden fortress on Vassek to test him. Grievous kills Vebb and the clones, but Fisto manages to escape.

In the second season, Grievous begins forcibly boarding Republic cruisers and captures Eeth Koth of the Jedi Council. When the Jedi launch a rescue mission to free Koth, Grievous duels Obi-Wan and is pursued to Saleucami before escaping.

In the third season, Grievous and Asajj Ventress lead an attack on the Republic's cloning facilities on Kamino. Grievous defeats Obi-Wan but Anakin and the clones prevent Ventress from securing the DNA sample of the clones' template. Grievous later dispatches a group of infiltrator droids to stage a bombing on the Galactic Senate on Coruscant to sabotage a peace agreement between the Republic and the Separatists.

In the fourth season, Grievous is neutralized by the Gungan army while attempting to invade Naboo, but is soon freed in a prisoner exchange after Dooku captures Anakin. Grievous defeats Adi Gallia during his attack on a Republic cruiser, though a rescue team led by Plo Koon frees her from captivity. After Dooku betrays Ventress, he sends Grievous to Dathomir to massacre Ventress and the Nightsister clan. Grievous briefly duels Ventress before foiling Mother Talzin's voodoo spell against Dooku and killing Daka, the leader of the Nightsisters.

In the fifth season, Grievous defeats a Republic fleet led by Obi-Wan and wins the battle for control over the Florrum system. He launches a full-scale attack on Florrum and fights pirate leader Hondo Ohnaka, Ahsoka Tano, and a group of Jedi younglings, forcing them to flee.

In the seventh and final season, Grievous leads the Separatist fleet during the Battle of Coruscant after he kidnaps Chancellor Palpatine. (Note: Leading into the events depicted in Star Wars: Episode III – Revenge of the Sith.) An unfinished story arc dubbed "Crystal Crisis" would have seen Grievous obtaining a giant kyber crystal on Utapau. Grievous duels Obi-Wan on his ship who is attempting to take the crystal from him, but Grievous quickly overpowers Kenobi, and takes him as a prisoner. Grievous attempts to execute Obi-Wan, but Anakin who had snuck onto the ship frees him before the execution takes place, and the two attempt to take the crystal back to Coruscant. Pinned down, Obi-Wan, and Anakin destroy the crystal with Grievous escaping as the explosion created by the crystal destroys Grievous' fleet.

==== The Bad Batch (2021–2024) ====
General Grievous makes a cameo appearance in the premiere episode of The Clone Wars's sequel series, The Bad Batch. Towards the end of the Clone Wars, Grievous escapes from the Battle of Coruscant after his attempt to kidnap Chancellor Palpatine is thwarted by Obi-Wan Kenobi and Anakin Skywalker. Retreating into the outer rim, Grievous orders his Separatist armies to mount a counterattack against Republic forces across the galaxy. (Note: Coinciding with the events depicted in Star Wars: Episode III – Revenge of the Sith.)

==== Tales of the Empire (2024) ====
In the season premiere, which takes place during the Separatists' massacre of the Nightsisters of Dathomir, Grievous fights and kills the Nightsister Selena in front of her daughter Morgan Elsbeth, before mockingly yelling at Morgan to run. (Note: Coinciding with the events depicted in The Clone Wars episode "Massacre".)

=== Comics ===
General Grievous appears in the four-issue comic book Star Wars: Darth Maul–Son of Dathomir, an unproduced story arc originally intended for the sixth season of The Clone Wars. Grievous is sent by Count Dooku to hunt down the rogue Sith lord Darth Maul, who has become a threat to Darth Sidious' plans. On Zanbar, Grievous defeats Maul and forces him to flee while the droid armies overwhelm Maul's Mandalorian Death Watch forces. Grievous and Dooku are later lured into a trap by Maul and Mother Talzin to draw out Sidious. Grievous escapes and rejoins Sidious in attacking Dathomir, where Talzin sacrifices herself to help Maul escape before she is killed by Grievous.

=== Legends ===
With the 2012 acquisition of Lucasfilm by The Walt Disney Company, most of the licensed Star Wars novels and comics produced since the original 1977 film were rebranded as Star Wars Legends and declared non-canon to the franchise in April 2014.

==== Clone Wars (2003–2005) ====
General Grievous as originally depicted in Clone Wars

General Grievous was originally introduced as a mysterious new antagonist in "Chapter 20", the season two finale of the 2003 Clone Wars micro series. He leads the Separatist droid armies on the planet Hypori as they surround a group of seven Jedi, comprising Masters Ki-Adi-Mundi, Shaak Ti, Daakman Barrek, and K'Kruhk; and Knights Aayla Secura, Tarr Seirr and Sha'a Gi. Grievous elects to face the Jedi alone and easily bests and kills most of them. Before Grievous can finish off Mundi, a squadron of clone ARC troopers arrives to extract the surviving Jedi. Grievous collects the lightsabers of the fallen Jedi as trophies.

In season three, set three years later, Grievous attacks Coruscant in an attempt to kidnap Chancellor Palpatine. The Jedi Masters defending the Chancellor include Shaak Ti, Roron Corobb and Foul Moudama. Grievous kills Corobb and Moudama, defeats Ti yet again, and manages to capture Palpatine. As Grievous boards his escape shuttle, Jedi Master Mace Windu arrives and uses the Force to crush Grievous' chestplate, severely damaging his internal organs and giving him his distinctive cough.

==== Literature ====
General Grievous's origin is revealed in the comic book "The Eyes of Revolution" from Star Wars: Visionaries. Grievous was originally Qymaen jai Sheelal, an organic reptilian humanoid native from the planet Kalee. The Kaleesh were at war with the rival Huk species and Sheelal was considered a demigod by his people for his victories in the Huk War. He fell in love with a warrior named Ronderu lij Kummar. Following Kummar's death during a mission, Sheelal realized that he was destined to forever mourn for her and rechristened himself as Grievous. He became a warlord and his swift attacks against the Huk prompted them to turn to the Jedi Knights of the Galactic Republic for help. Hefty fines and embargoes came down upon Kalee and thousands of Grievous' people starved and died in poverty. Appealing to Grievous' hatred of the Jedi and the Republic, San Hill of the InterGalactic Banking Clan enlisted him to serve as their enforcer in exchange for the Banking Clan's help in taking on Kalee's massive debt. Impressed by Grievous' abilities as a fighter, Hill and Count Dooku arranged for his shuttle to crash to ensure his permanent servitude to the Separatists. Dooku convinced the mortally wounded Grievous that the Jedi responsible for his homeworld's plight were the ones who caused the crash. Grievous accepted Dooku's offer to reconstruct him with a cyborg body and became the Supreme Commander of the Droid Armies to seek revenge against the Jedi.

In the third volume of Clone Wars Adventures, Count Dooku pits Grievous against Asajj Ventress and Durge to test his abilities. Grievous swiftly defeats the pair and emerges victorious, earning his position as the Supreme Martial Commander of the Separatist Droid Armies.

Grievous starred in his own comic called Star Wars: General Grievous, in which he fights Jedi Master T'chooka D'oon and his Padawan Flyn. After Grievous kills D'oon, Kybo returns to the Jedi council with a plan to destroy Grievous once and for all. When the council rebukes his vengeful plan, Kybo decides to take this matter into own hands with disastrous results. Grievous also appears in the comics in Star Wars: Obsession issue number 4, in which he is on the world of Boz Pity, where he kills two Jedi, Master Soon Bayts and Jedi Council member Adi Gallia. Though Windu injures Grievous, Dooku is able to save the general so he may fight another day.

In the novel Labyrinth of Evil, Grievous plans an invasion of Coruscant alongside Dooku and Sidious. He first appears in the novel watching his hated subordinate Nute Gunray flee from a pursuant Republic Strike Force. Grievous reluctantly saves Gunray by destroying the fighters. Grievous's invasion of the planet Belderone would also be thwarted by Anakin and Obi-Wan due to a careless mistake on Gunray's part. Though Gunray resorts to lies, Grievous deduces that he is lying and threatens to kill him. Later on the bridge of the Invisible Hand, Dooku watches as Grievous spars his elite Magnaguards. Though Grievous wins the fight, Dooku points out several flaws in the general's technique while realizing he is partly to blame for the general's inadequacies. Grievous soon launches his invasion on the Republic capital of Coruscant in an attempt to kidnap Supreme Chancellor Palpatine, placing himself on the battlefield once again. During the invasion, Grievous battles Mace Windu atop a maglev train while personally trying to capture Palpatine. Though Windu overwhelms Grievous in combat, the cyborg outwits the Jedi Guard and takes Palpatine hostage, setting the stage for Revenge of the Sith.

==== Video games ====
General Grievous has been featured in numerous Star Wars video games, as a boss and occasional playable character.

- Star Wars: Republic Commando (2005)
- Lego Star Wars: The Video Game (2005)
- Star Wars: Episode III – Revenge of the Sith (2005)
- Star Wars: Battlefront II (2005)
- Lego Star Wars II: The Original Trilogy (2006)
- Star Wars Battlefront: Renegade Squadron (2007)
- Lego Star Wars: The Complete Saga (2007)
- Star Wars: The Clone Wars – Lightsaber Duels (2008)
- Star Wars Battlefront: Elite Squadron (2009)
- Clone Wars Adventures (2010)
- Lego Star Wars III: The Clone Wars (2011)
- Kinect Star Wars (2012)
- Angry Birds Star Wars II (2013)
- Disney Infinity 3.0 (2015)
- Star Wars: Galaxy of Heroes (2015)
- Lego Star Wars: The Force Awakens (2016)
- Star Wars: Force Arena (2017)
- Star Wars Battlefront II (2017)
- Lego Star Wars: The Skywalker Saga (2022)
- Fortnite Battle Royale (2025)

== Reception ==
General Grievous has become a fan favorite character and is considered one of the most popular villains in the Star Wars franchise.

Several entertainment publications have placed General Grievous in "Top 10 Star Wars Villains" lists. While the character's limited presence in Revenge of the Sith was criticized, his greater role and appearances throughout the Clone Wars in both the 2003 and 2008 animated series were praised for expanding on Grievous' character.

The character's line from Revenge of the Sith, "Your lightsabers will make a fine addition to my collection", has gained popularity as an Internet meme. Amanda Derby from Screen Rant wrote: "Greet a Star Wars fan with the words, 'Hello there,' and they'll likely respond with, 'General Kenobi'. This alone is a testament to the popularity of General Grievous. Though it's hard to say whether fans love him for his skill or his meme-ability, there's no denying that Grievous is a favorite."
