= Dooku: Jedi Lost =

2019 audio drama by Cavan Scott

- Cover of Dooku: Jedi Lost

Del Rey Books audio drama
- Series
- Written by: Cavan Scott
- Length: 6 hours, 21 minutes
- Release date: April 30, 2019 (audio); October 1, 2019 (eBook); March 30, 2021 (paperback)
- Language: English

Star Wars: Dooku: Jedi Lost is an audio drama set in Star Wars that was written by Cavan Scott and published on April 30, 2019, by Del Rey Books. An eBook was later released on October 1, 2019, and a paperback edition was published on March 30, 2021.

== Reception ==
James Whitebrook of Gizmodo praised the audio drama's closer examination of Count Dooku's path to the dark side, portrayed as more complicated than depicted in the Star Wars prequels. Sean Keane of CNET also commented on Jedi Lost's exploration of Dooku's early life, calling it "fascinating".

== See also ==
- List of Star Wars books, the list of novels published in the Star Wars series
