= Asajj Ventress =

Character in the Star Wars franchise

- Star Wars character
- Asajj Ventress in Star Wars: The Clone Wars
- First appearance: "Chapter 6"; Clone Wars; (2003)
- Created by: Genndy Tartakovsky; George Lucas
- Voiced by: Grey DeLisle (Note: Clone Wars, The Force Unleashed); Nika Futterman (Note: The Clone Wars film and TV series, The Bad Batch, Tales of the Underworld, The Padawan Menace, and various video games); Trish Pattendon (Note: The Yoda Chronicles)

In-universe information
- Species: Dathomirian Zabrak
- Gender: Female
- Occupation: Jedi Padawan; Sith assassin Separatist Commander; Bounty hunter
- Affiliation: Jedi Order; Sith Order; Confederacy of Independent Systems; Nightsisters
- Significant other: Quinlan Vos
- Masters: Ky Narec (Jedi Master); Count Dooku (Sith Master)
- Apprentices: Savage Opress; Quinlan Vos
- Homeworld: Rattatak (homeworld; Legends); Dathomir (birthplace)

Asajj Ventress (/əˈsɑːʒ ˈvɛntrəs/) is a character in the Star Wars franchise. She was introduced in Genndy Tartakovsky's 2003 animated series Star Wars: Clone Wars, in which she was voiced by Grey DeLisle. The character later appeared in the 2008 animated film Star Wars: The Clone Wars and the subsequent television series of the same name, the 2021 Disney+ series Star Wars: The Bad Batch, and the 2025 miniseries Tales of the Underworld. Throughout all of her animated appearances, she has been voiced by actress Nika Futterman. In addition to the television series, the character has also appeared in various Star Wars books, comics, and video games.

Ventress is a Zabrak from Dathomir's Nightsister clan of witches who is surrendered into slavery as an infant before being rescued and trained in the ways of the Force as a Jedi. The death of her Jedi Master causes Ventress to fall to the dark side of the Force and become the Sith Lord Count Dooku's informal apprentice and personal assassin. She serves as a commander for the Confederacy of Independent Systems and fights the Jedi of the Galactic Republic during the Clone Wars until she is betrayed by Dooku. Ventress returns to the Nightsisters and makes several failed attempts on Dooku's life, after which she turns to bounty hunting as an independent mercenary. She forms an alliance, and later a relationship, with the Jedi Quinlan Vos and sacrifices herself to save him from Dooku. After being resurrected by the Nightsisters' spirits, Ventress continues her bounty hunting career into the era of the Galactic Empire, and has encounters with Clone Force 99 and a young survivor of the Great Jedi Purge, Lyco Strata.

== Characterization ==
=== Creation ===
Original concept art for a female Sith villain that would eventually be used for Asajj Ventress

Before the character of Count Dooku was developed, the art department for Star Wars: Episode II – Attack of the Clones (2002) developed a Sith villainess as a potential main antagonist.

When the Star Wars expanded universe resurrected this female Sith idea as one of Dooku's underlings who could appear more frequently throughout the Clone Wars, this nameless Separatist Commander was dubbed Juno Eclipse, but the name was rejected as "not villainous enough", and she was renamed Asajj Ventress. The name Juno Eclipse was later given to a character from the video game Star Wars: The Force Unleashed, with no relation to Ventress.

LucasArts' Leland Chee suggested using "Asajj" as the character's first name, naming her after the character Asaji from Akira Kurosawa's Throne of Blood.

=== Portrayal ===
Asajj Ventress was voiced by Grey DeLisle in the 2003 Clone Wars micro-series, and by Nika Futterman in the 2008 animated film Star Wars: The Clone Wars and its subsequent television series, as well as most of her video game and other animated appearances.

== Appearances ==
=== The Clone Wars ===
Ventress is an antagonist in the 2008 The Clone Wars film. As the disciple of Count Dooku, she helps him with his plan to turn Jabba the Hutt against the Galactic Republic by kidnapping his son Rotta. Ventress fights Jedi Knight Anakin Skywalker and his apprentice Ahsoka Tano, who rescue Rotta, and later also battles Jedi Master Obi-Wan Kenobi, who defeats her, forcing her to flee.

Ventress is a lead character in all five broadcast seasons of the subsequent The Clone Wars animated series. In season one, Ventress travels to the moon of Rugosa as Dooku's emissary to form an alliance between the planet Toydaria and the Separatists. The king of Toydaria is reluctant but allows her forces to face Yoda in battle to prove which side is superior. When the king decides to side with the Republic, Dooku gives his assassin permission to kill the king so they may have a better chance with the successor. Yoda thwarts her attempt, however, and she is forced to flee. Dooku orders Ventress to spy on the planet Kamino for the Separatist forces, planning an invasion with General Grievous to destroy the clone production facilities while stealing Jango Fett's DNA template from the production facility. Ventress then frees Trade Federation Viceroy Nute Gunray from the custody of Luminara Unduli and Ahsoka, fighting the two Jedi before ultimately succeeding in her mission.

In season three, Ventress' back story is explained: she hails from the planet Dathomir and was sold by the Nightsisters to criminals. She would have likely been killed in a pirate raid if not for Jedi Ky Narec, who had crashed on Rattatak. Narec sensed her potential and trained her in the ways of the Force. However, warlord Osika Kirske killed Narec before Ventress could become a full-fledged Jedi. She developed an implacable hatred of the Jedi Order, which she believes abandoned her master and ignored the bloodshed on her planet.

Eventually, Darth Sidious comes to see Ventress as a liability, and orders Dooku to eliminate her. Dooku attempts, unsuccessfully, to kill her, as she engages Anakin and Obi-Wan in one final duel, in which she is wounded. She turns to the Nightsisters of Dathomir for help, and they engineer Savage Opress to serve as Dooku's new apprentice in order to earn his trust, before ultimately killing him on Ventress' behalf. The scheme fails, however, when Opress turns on both Dooku and Ventress and attempts to kill them both.

In season four, Ventress returns to the Nightsisters. She undergoes the ritual to become a full-fledged Nightsister, but is thwarted when Grievous' droid army slaughter the Nightsisters while their matriarch Mother Talzin is rendered incorporeal. Told by Talzin to find her own path, Ventress later helps Boba Fett's team of bounty hunters in a dangerous but profitable mission. She then finally makes peace with her past with an ideal future as a bounty hunter. While still haunted by Opress, she tracks him to Raydonia to collect a bounty on him. When she arrives on Opress' spaceship, she confronts him and Darth Maul as they are about to kill Obi-Wan. Ventress teams up with her old nemesis to fight Maul and Opress, but they are ultimately forced to escape in their shuttle.

In season five's final arc, Ventress nearly apprehends Ahsoka, who has been framed for attempting to destroy the Jedi Temple. She ultimately helps Ahsoka escape on the condition that she would be exonerated. Ventress later helps Anakin discover that Barriss Offee, who stole her lightsabers, has framed Ahsoka.

=== Dark Disciple ===
In the 2015 novel Dark Disciple, based on unfinished episodes from The Clone Wars, Ventress teams up with undercover Jedi Master Quinlan Vos in an "un-Jedi like" mission to kill Dooku. Ventress falls in love with Vos and, after the latter is turned to the dark side by Dooku, she manages to redeem him. During a final confrontation with Dooku, Ventress is fatally struck with Force lightning; her body is subsequently brought to Dathomir by Vos, so that she may rejoin her fallen sisters in spirit.

=== The Bad Batch ===
In January 2024, the third season trailer for Star Wars: The Bad Batch revealed that Ventress had survived the events of Dark Disciple and would appear in the season's storyline. Brad Rau, the supervising director of The Bad Batch, said that the appearance would be faithful and not contradictory to the events of the book. During the early reign of the Galactic Empire, Ventress comes face-to-face with Clone Force 99, and despite the mutual distrust between them, she ends up coming to the aid of Omega. Her appearance in The Bad Batch showed viewers that although Ventress was once a villain, she is now harnessing the light side of the Force and is capable of compassion.

=== Tales of the Underworld ===
Ventress appears as a main character in the third season of the Star Wars Tales anthology series, titled Tales of the Underworld, which premiered on Disney+ on May 4, 2025. Featured in the episodes "A Way Forward", "Friends", and "One Warrior to Another", it is revealed that after her death in Dark Disciple, Ventress was resurrected by the spirits of Mother Talzin and the other Nightsisters, as Vos' love was a gift, presenting her with two paths: she could either stay with her fallen Nightsisters on Dathomir, or she could return to the living. She ultimately chose the latter.

Years later, during the Empire's reign over the galaxy, Ventress continues to operate as a mercenary and encounters Lyco Strata, a teenage Jedi Padawan who is looking for "the Path", a network established by Vos to help Jedi survivors and other Force users avoid detection by the Empire. After a battle against a Sith Inquisitor, a reunion with her bounty hunter acquaintance Latts Razzi and her droid assassin C-21 Highsinger, and an encounter with an elderly former Separatist and his granddaughter, Ventress and Lyco manage to find the Path, but choose not to go and instead continue travelling together.

=== Other works ===
Star Wars Resistance executive producer/head writer Brandon Auman revealed in 2021 that, prior to its cancellation, the series had almost featured a duel between Ventress and sequel trilogy antagonist Kylo Ren (respectively the first and last characters to use the titles of "Supreme Leader" in the Star Wars universe).

=== Legends ===
With the 2012 acquisition of Lucasfilm by The Walt Disney Company, most of the licensed Star Wars Expanded Universe material produced since the originating 1977 film Star Wars was rebranded as Star Wars Legends and declared non-canon to the franchise in April 2014.

==== Clone Wars ====
Asajj Ventress in Star Wars: Clone Wars

Asajj Ventress first appeared as a supporting antagonist in the 2003 micro-series Star Wars: Clone Wars. When Count Dooku arrives to add the planet Rattatak to his Separatist movement, he witnesses Ventress fighting several opponents in a large arena, defeating them all before claiming to be a Sith warrior. When Dooku laughs aside the notion that she could be a Sith, Ventress tries to attack him, but the Sith Lord renders her unconscious with Force lightning. After she awakens, Dooku attacks her again, but she jumps backwards and ignites her blue and green lightsabers. In her quarters, a short duel takes place in which Dooku cuts her two lightsabers in half, rendering her defenseless. Although Ventress is defeated, Dooku is impressed by her abilities and recruits her to be his apprentice by appealing to her hatred of the Jedi.

Darth Sidious later personally assigns Ventress to kill Anakin Skywalker, and Dooku presents the Dark Jedi with a new pair of red lightsabers with curved hilts. After Ventress leaves, Sidious remarks that she is certain to fail, but that she will serve as a useful test for Anakin. Ventress engages the Republic fighter forces in orbit of the planet Muunilinst and lures Anakin into a chase. Anakin and a small contingent of clone troopers track Ventress to Yavin IV, and a fierce battle from the forest to the Massassi temple takes place. Though she eliminates all the clones and initially gains the upper hand in their duel, Anakin briefly succumbs to his connection to the dark side of the Force and brutally overpowers her, causing Ventress to fall over the edge of a cliff.

==== Novels ====
As portrayed in the novel The Cestus Deception, Ventress appears on Ord Cestus during the Bio-Droid Crisis. She is behind the X'Ting criminal Trillot's dealings with Obi-Wan. Ventress also destroys the Republic Cruiser carrying Barrister Doolb Snoil returning to the Republic; however, Snoil survives. Ventress later challenges Kenobi and his fellow Jedi Master Kit Fisto to a duel. Ventress disarms Fisto but is then engaged by Kenobi. Their duel leads them into an underwater chamber and Ventress is forced to escape after Kenobi slices her across her abdomen. She lets loose a smoke bomb and flees back to the Confederacy and Dooku.

==== Comic books ====
In the Star Wars: Republic story "The New Face of War", Ventress joins forces with the bounty hunter Durge on the invasion of Naboo's moon, Ohma-D'un. Together they use swamp gas to wipe out the Gungan colony and prepare to launch a biological attack on Naboo. In the ensuing battle with Republic forces, Ventress makes her first public appearance in the war (in the chronological timeline). Ventress kills Jedi Master Glaive in the battle and cuts off his apprentice Zule's left arm. She engages Obi-Wan and the pair are evenly matched. Ventress escapes with Durge after ARC Trooper Alpha destroys their fueling station.

In Star Wars: Jedi – Mace Windu, Dooku sends Ventress to Ruul to help frame Mace Windu. Ventress briefly confronts Sora Bulq, who had been secretly corrupted by Dooku, as a ruse. Ventress kills Mira in the battle and then engages Jedi Masters Sian Jeisel, K' Kruhk and Rhad Tarn all of whom she defeats singlehandedly. After framing Windu for the crime, Ventress corrupts Tarn. While Tarn fights against Jeisel, Ventress defeats K'Kruhk in combat. Windu's timely arrival saves the Jedi; Ventress finds that she is no match for Windu's power and is forced to flee.

In the Republic story "Blast Radius", Ventress and Durge again engage the Jedi taskforce in a facility on the planet Queyta. Ventress briefly fights against Kenobi and Fay. Durge kills Jon Antilles and Knol Ven'Nari. After Ven'nari is killed in an explosion, Durge pushes Antilles into a lava pit. Ventress uses her lightsabers to collapse the ceiling, sending a shower of lava onto Diath's head. Although the Separatists claim a victory, Ventress spares Obi-Wan's life under Dooku's orders, though she impales Fay in the chest with her lightsabers. Fay gives Obi-Wan the last of her strength to escape the facility.

In "The Battle of Jabiim", Ventress captures Obi-Wan and Alpha from Jabiim and transports them to Rattatak for torture and interrogation. Obi-Wan and Alpha escape in the following story, "Hate & Fear", and the Jedi Master takes Ky Narec's lightsaber, making the animosity between him and Ventress deeply personal.

In "Dreadnoughts of Rendili", Ventress and fellow Dark Jedi Tol Skorr fight Obi-Wan and Quinlan Vos on Titavian IV. Obi-Wan unleashes a rancor to distract Ventress, but she manipulates it via the dark side. Obi-Wan fights Ventress after killing the rancor but he escapes with Vos before the duel is settled. Grievous arrives to rescue the two Dark Jedi, shaming Ventress in their master Dooku's eyes.

Ventress then travels to Coruscant to kill Vos and Obi-Wan. During the mission, she discovers Anakin's secret marriage to Senator Padmé Amidala. Enraged, Anakin engages Ventress. During the duel, Ventress scars Skywalker's face but she is once again overpowered and suffers another huge fall. Republic Intelligence assumes that she is dead.

"Obsession" marks the character's final appearance in Republic. Ventress survives her encounter with Anakin on Coruscant but is badly injured. She is sent to Boz Pity where Dooku places her in a bacta tank and fits her with cybernetic modifications. One month later, Obi-Wan infiltrates the facility. Ventress wakes up and subsequently attacks him. She fights against both Obi-Wan and Anakin but is abandoned when Dooku orders an IG-100 MagnaGuard to kill her as she runs towards Dooku's shuttle. Enraged and badly wounded, Ventress tries to kill Obi-Wan as he tries to help her. Anakin slashes her from behind, mortally wounding her. As she lies dying, she tells him the location of the Separatists' next target. Believing Ventress to be dead, Obi-Wan puts her on a ship bound for Coruscant. However, Ventress survives by placing herself in a Sith trance. While on the shuttle, she emerges from her trance and orders the pilots to take her as far away as possible from Dooku, the Jedi, and the war. The clones agree, and so Ventress escapes the Clone Wars.

=== Video games ===
Asajj Ventress, based on her design in the 2003 Clone Wars micro-series, appears as a secret playable character in Lego Star Wars: The Complete Saga via the character creator. She is also featured in Lego Star Wars: The Force Awakens and Lego Star Wars: The Skywalker Saga as downloadable content. In Star Wars Battlefront: Renegade Squadron, she is a playable hero for the Separatists, available on the Saleucami and Sullust maps. In the PlayStation 2, Wii, and PlayStation Portable ports of Star Wars: The Force Unleashed, Ventress is available as an alternate skin for the game's protagonist, Starkiller, and is playable in the multiplayer mode, which is exclusive to the Wii version. She returns as a playable character in the Wii version of Star Wars: The Force Unleashed II.

Ventress has appeared in several video games based on Star Wars: The Clone Wars, using her design from the animated series. She is a playable character in The Clone Wars – Lightsaber Duels and Lego Star Wars III: The Clone Wars, and a boss in The Clone Wars – Jedi Alliance and The Clone Wars – Republic Heroes. Nika Futterman reprises her role as Ventress across all of her video game appearances.

The character is also featured in several Star Wars video games released after Disney's acquisition of Lucasfilm, including the tower defense game Star Wars: Galactic Defense, and the turn-based RPG Star Wars: Galaxy of Heroes.
