= Wing T. Chao =

American architect and hospitality professional

Wing Tao Chao
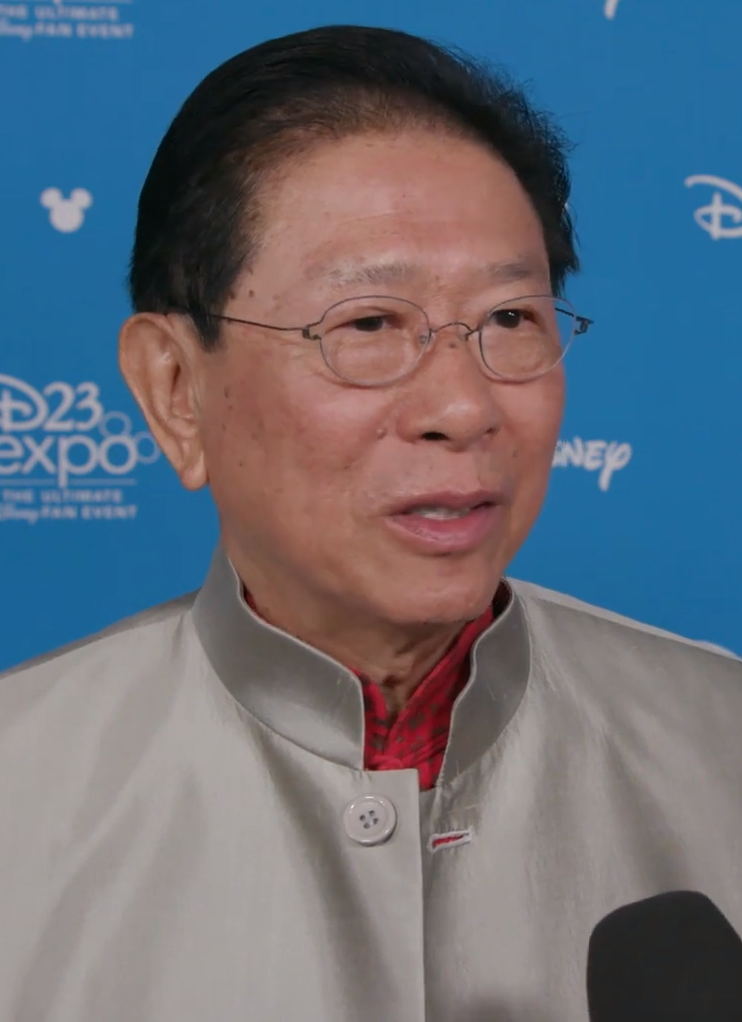
- Born: 趙永濤; May 1944; Chongqing, Sichuan, China
- Education: University of California, Berkeley; Harvard University
- Occupation: Architect
- Awards: Pioneer Award (ISHC); Committee of 100 member Outstanding Achievement Award (AIA); Legend Award (Contract Magazine)
- Practice: Vice Chairman (Walt Disney Parks and Resorts); Executive Vice President (Walt Disney Imagineering)
- Projects: Epcot Center; Disneyland Paris; Disneyland Hong Kong
- Design: Disney Wonder; Disney Dream

Wing Tao Chao (born May 1944) is a Chinese-born American architect, master planner, construction developer, hospitality professional, and a former Disney Imagineer.

As an Imagineer, Chao helped with Disney's expansion in markets such as China and Hong Kong, handling businesses worth more than US$12 billion. He was with Disney for over 37 years, from 1972 to 2009, and led over 100 projects including Disneyland resorts, luxury hotels, and cruises. In 2009, he retired from Disney and joined Las Vegas Sands Corp. In August 2019, he was named a Disney Legend.

Chao is regarded as a pioneer in the fields of hospitality and construction planning and development. A Committee of 100 member and an AIA fellow, he has received numerous honors throughout his career including the Pioneer Award from the International Society of Hospitality Consultants (ISHC) and Outstanding Achievement Award from the American Institute of Architects. Avenue magazine has included Chao among the 500 most influential Asians in the United States.

== Personal life ==
Chao was born in Chongqing, China in May 1944. He moved to the United States in his teens to pursue education. He lives in Los Angeles, California.

== Education ==
Chao attended the University of California, Berkeley where he received his Bachelor and master's degrees in Architecture. He has a second master's degree in Architecture, majoring in Urban Design, from Harvard University, where he studied under Kenzo Tange, the legendary Japanese architect who predicted the Information Age.

He was conferred an Honorary Doctorate Degree in Business Administration in Hospitality Management by Johnson and Wales University. He also completed post-graduate work in Urban Planning and Real Estate Development at MIT.

Chao had originally wanted to study medicine and be a doctor.

== Career ==
Chao began his architectural career with William Liskam Architect after completing his education. He joined Disney as an associate soon after.

=== Walt Disney Imagineering ===
Chao joined Disney in 1972. He had unsuccessfully tried to get a summer job at one of its amusement parks during his Berkeley days.

His roles at Disney included: Vice Chairman of Development for Walt Disney Parks and Resorts in the Asia Pacific (1984 to 1997) and Executive Vice President in charge of Master Planning, Architecture and Design at Walt Disney Imagineering (1997 to 2009). He also oversaw the development of Disney's land holdings in California, Florida, Tokyo, Paris and Hong Kong.

During his time at Disney, Chao led development teams consisting of Disney Imagineers and leading architects and designers on over a hundred projects including Disney theme parks and resort hotel rooms. Chao has also led the design and development of four Disney cruise ships, namely Disney Magic, Disney Dream, Disney Fantasy, and Disney Wonder. Chao has handled businesses worth more than USD $12 billion over his term at Disney.

Chao is credited with the successful negotiations with French and Hong Kong governments that led to the development of Euro Disneyland and Hong Kong Disneyland respectively. He retired from Walt Disney Imagineering on 30 June 2009.

=== Notable works at Disney ===
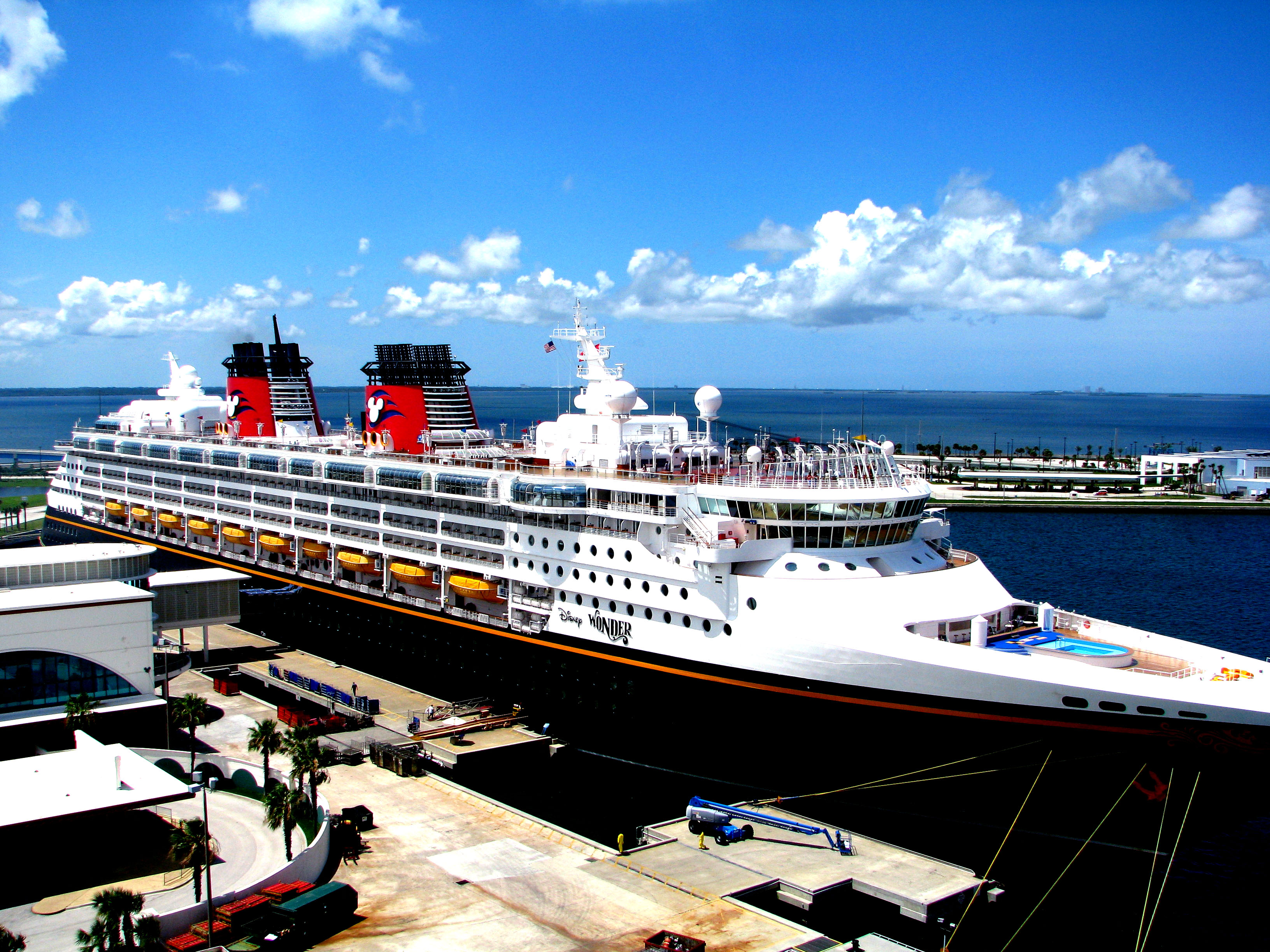
Disney Wonder docked at Port Canaveral

Resorts:

- Disneyland Paris
- Hong Kong Disneyland Resort
- Tokyo Disneyland

Cruise ships:

- Disney Magic
- Disney Wonder
- Disney Dream
- Disney Fantasy

=== Las Vegas Sands ===
Chao served as a Director for Las Vegas Sands Corp. from July 2010 to November 2010. He continues to be a part of the advisory board.

=== Television ===
Chao has appeared in three television shows produced by Disney.

- The Imagineering Story as himself (2019)
- The Mandalorian as Governor Wing (2020)
- Star Wars: Tales of the Empire as Governor Wing (2024; voice)

== Awards and recognition ==
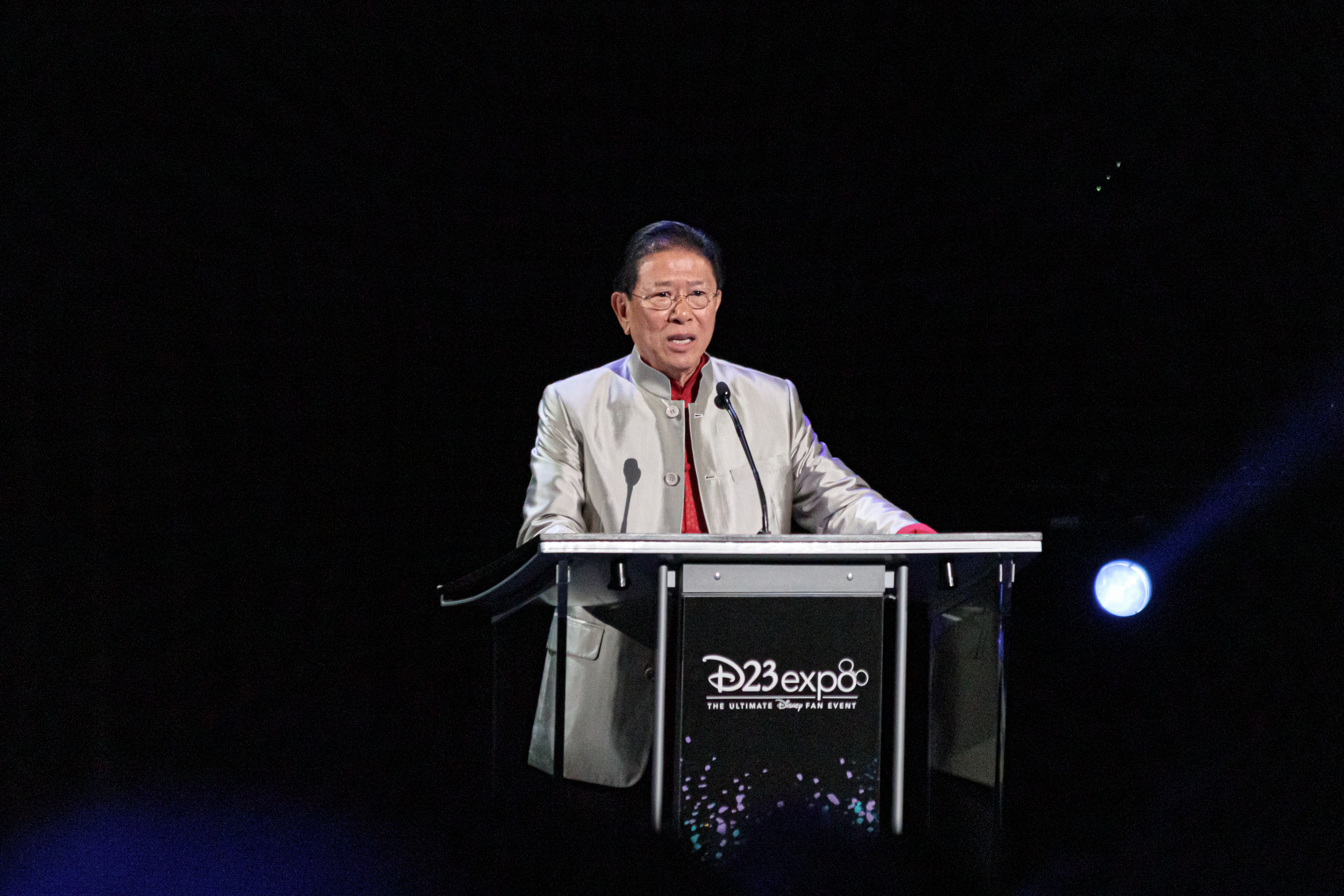
Chao at the D23 Expo

Chao has received numerous accolades for his work in the hospitality sector. His works have earned him recognition awards in the architecture and design community.

He is a Fellow of the American Institute of Architects which also honored him with the Outstanding Achievement Award. He has also won the Legend Award by Contract magazine. In 1992, Chao received the Asian American Architects and Engineers Association's Outstanding Achievement Award. Hospitality Design has named Chao one of the top 20 Hospitality Industry Leaders and Innovators and has also inducted him as a Platinum Circle member. In 2007, Chao was elected into the 'Committee of 100', an organization founded by I. M. Pei to honor American citizens of Chinese descent who have distinguished themselves as leaders in their respective professions. He has also been named one of the 500 most influential Asians in the United States.

On January 24, 2018, Chao received the Pioneer Award from the International Society of Hospitality Consultants (ISHC) for his services to entertainment design and hospitality.

Chao was named a Disney Legend at the 2019 D23 Expo for his outstanding contributions to the Disney Parks and The Walt Disney Company.
