= Star Wars Tales (TV anthology) =

Group of American animated television series

Tales
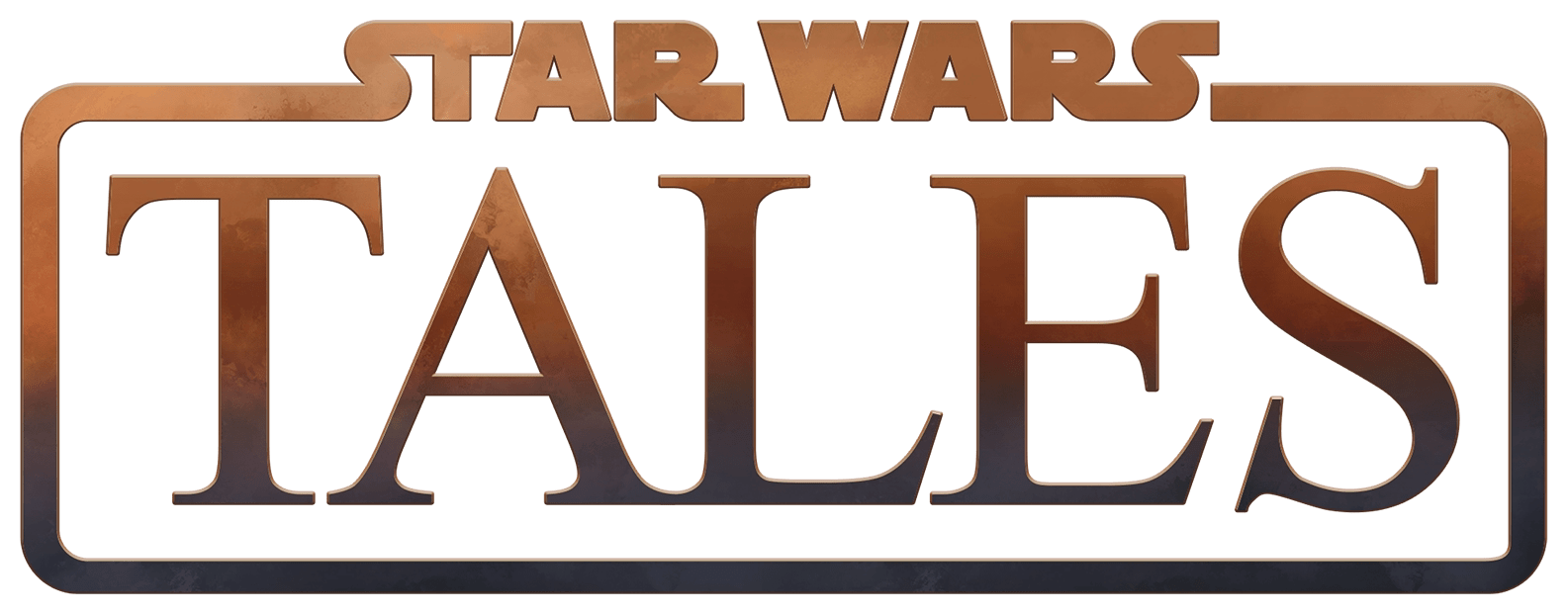
- Logo for the Star Wars Tales collection
- Also known as: Star Wars Tales
- Genre: Action-adventure; Anthology; Science fiction
- Created by: Dave Filoni
- Based on: Star Wars by George Lucas
- Voices of: Ashley Eckstein; Corey Burton; Diana Lee Inosanto; Meredith Salenger; Nika Futterman
- Composers: Kevin Kiner; Sean Kiner; Deana Kiner
- Country of origin: United States
- Original language: English
- No. of series: 3
- No. of episodes: 18

Production
- Executive producers: Dave Filoni; Athena Yvette Portillo; Carrie Beck
- Producers: Alex Spotswood; Josh Rimes
- Running time: 13–19 minutes
- Production companies: Lucasfilm; Lucasfilm Animation

Original release
- Network: Disney+
- Release: October 26, 2022 – May 4, 2025

Related
- Star Wars: The Clone Wars

Tales, also known as Star Wars Tales, (Note: Lucasfilm referred to the group of series as the "Tales franchise" and the "Tales anthology series". They are collected on Disney+ under the title Star Wars Tales.) is a collection of American animated anthology television series created by Dave Filoni for the streaming service Disney+. Each series consists of six shorts that explore characters from the Star Wars franchise. They are produced by Lucasfilm Animation with Filoni as supervising director.

Filoni began writing Star Wars: Tales of the Jedi while working on the live-action Star Wars series The Mandalorian (2019–2023). He revealed the first official details in May 2022. It explores Jedi from the prequel trilogy era and follows two "paths", one focused on Ahsoka Tano (voiced by Ashley Eckstein) and the other on Count Dooku (voiced by Corey Burton). Tales of the Jedi was released on Disney+ on October 26, 2022, and received critical acclaim, with praise towards its animation, writing, and musical score.

A second installment was announced in April 2023, and was revealed a year later to be titled Star Wars: Tales of the Empire. It explores characters related to the Galactic Empire and is again split into two arcs: one follows Morgan Elsbeth (voiced by Diana Lee Inosanto) and the other follows former Jedi Barriss Offee (voiced by Meredith Salenger). Tales of the Empire was released on May 4, 2024.

Star Wars: Tales of the Underworld, focused on bounty hunters active in the criminal underworld, was announced in April 2025. Like its predecessors, it is split into two arcs: one following Asajj Ventress (voiced by Nika Futterman) and the other following Cad Bane (voiced by Corey Burton). Tales of the Underworld was released on May 4, 2025.

== Premise ==
Tales of the Jedi tells short stories featuring Jedi from the Star Wars prequel trilogy era. Its six episodes are split into two "paths": the first following Ahsoka Tano across various points in her life, and the other depicting a young Count Dooku before his fall to the dark side of the Force. The second installment, Tales of the Empire, is set in different eras of the Star Wars timeline, with one path following a young Morgan Elsbeth and the other following former Jedi Barriss Offee. The third installment, Tales of the Underworld, is focused on bounty hunters. One story follows Asajj Ventress on the run with a new ally, and the other follows Cad Bane as he confronts an old friend who is on the other side of the law.

== Episodes ==
Series	Episodes	Originally released
Tales of the Jedi	6	October 26, 2022
Tales of the Empire	6	May 4, 2024
Tales of the Underworld	6	May 4, 2025

=== Tales of the Jedi (2022) ===
No.	Title	Directed by	Written by	Original release date
1	"Life and Death"	Nathaniel Villanueva	Dave Filoni	October 26, 2022
A year after her birth, an infant Ahsoka Tano is taken on her first hunting trip by her mother, Pav-ti, as is customary for their people. While hunting, they are stalked by a large predatory animal which kidnaps Ahsoka. Pav-ti returns to the village for help, but is surprised to see Ahsoka arrive at the village soon after riding the animal, having subdued it in the forest. Gantika, a village elder, realizes that Ahsoka has a strong connection to the Force. Cast: Toks Olagundoye as Gantika, Sunil Malhotra as Nak-il, Janina Gavankar as Pav-ti, and Noshir Dalal as a villager
2	"Justice"	Saul Ruiz	Dave Filoni	October 26, 2022
Jedi Master Dooku and his Padawan learner, Qui-Gon Jinn, find the kidnapped son of Senator Dagonet in a dilapidated village where the locals are struggling due to the senator's corruption. Dagonet arrives with troops and attacks the villagers. Dooku, angered by the corrupt senator, threatens to kill him with the Force. Qui-Gon and the senator's son convince Dooku to spare Dagonet, and the son promises to help the villagers. Cast: Corey Burton as Dooku and an armed villager, Micheál Richardson as Qui-Gon Jinn, Mark Rolston as Senator Dagonet, Josh Keaton as Senator Dagonet's son, and Vanessa Marshall as a village elder
3	"Choices"	Charles Murray	Charles Murray and Élan Murray	October 26, 2022
Dooku and Jedi Master Mace Windu recover the body of Jedi Council member Katri from Raxus Secundus. Dooku insists on investigating Katri's death, against orders, and they discover that Katri was killed by guards who wanted to stop corrupt Senator Larik from draining Raxus's resources. At Katri's funeral, Windu reveals that he has been given the vacant Jedi Council spot instead of Dooku and attributes this to Dooku's rule-breaking. Cast: Corey Burton as Dooku, Andrew Kishino as Hanel and a guard, Brian George as Ki-Adi-Mundi, TC Carson as Mace Windu, Terrell Tilford as Semage, and Theo Rossi as Senator Larik
4	"The Sith Lord"	Saul Ruiz	Dave Filoni	October 26, 2022
Following the secret plan of the Sith Lord Darth Sidious, Dooku poses as Jedi Master Sifo-Dyas and deletes all records of the planet Kamino from the Jedi Archives. When Qui-Gon is killed by Darth Maul, (Note: "The Sith Lord" takes place concurrently with the events of the film Star Wars: Episode I – The Phantom Menace (1999)) Dooku confronts Sidious about Qui-Gon's death. He is followed by Jedi Master Yaddle, who tries to reason with Dooku, but Dooku kills Yaddle on Sidious's orders, solidifying his fall to the dark side of the Force. Cast: Ian McDiarmid as Darth Sidious, Corey Burton as Dooku, Meg Marchand as the Jedi Temple Archive voice, Flo Di Re as Jocasta Nu, Liam Neeson as Qui-Gon Jinn, and Bryce Dallas Howard as Yaddle
5	"Practice Makes Perfect"	Saul Ruiz	Dave Filoni	October 26, 2022
Disappointed with the simple battle simulations that his Padawan, Ahsoka, has to train with, Anakin Skywalker instead has her face a large group of clone troopers armed with stun guns. He repeats this training with her over the course of the Clone Wars. At the end of the war, the clones turn on the Jedi with the enactment of Order 66. Ahsoka uses the skills she gained during these drills to survive the attacking clones. (Note: As depicted in the final season of Star Wars: The Clone Wars (2020)) Cast: Ashley Eckstein as Ahsoka Tano, Matt Lanter as Anakin Skywalker, Dee Bradley Baker as Captain Rex and Jesse, and James Arnold Taylor as Obi-Wan Kenobi
6	"Resolve"	Saul Ruiz	Dave Filoni	October 26, 2022
During the funeral of Padmé Amidala, (Note: "Resolve"'s cold open takes place concurrently with the events of the film Star Wars: Episode III – Revenge of the Sith (2005)) Senator Bail Organa tells Ahsoka to contact him if she needs help. Some time later, while in hiding, Ahsoka is seen using the Force to help someone who is in danger. She is reported to the Galactic Empire, and an Inquisitor is sent to capture her. Ahsoka kills the Inquisitor and contacts Organa, who comes to collect her the next day. She tells him that she is ready to fight against the Empire. Cast: Ashley Eckstein as Ahsoka Tano, Phil LaMarr as Bail Organa, Clancy Brown as an Inquisitor, David Shaughnessy as an old man, Dee Bradley Baker as security clone troopers, Bryton James as the village brother, and Dana Davis as the village sister

=== Tales of the Empire (2024) ===
No.	Title	Directed by	Written by	Original release date
1	"The Path of Fear"	Nathaniel Villanueva	Story by : Dave Filoni; Written by : Amanda Rose Muñoz	May 4, 2024
During the Clone Wars, General Grievous and the Separatist droid army massacre the Nightsisters of Dathomir, (Note: As depicted in the Star Wars: The Clone Wars episode "Massacre" (2012)) except for Morgan Elsbeth who is saved by the nearby Mountain Clan. Against the wishes of the clan's leader, the Matron, Morgan and three young clan members attempt to recover Nightsister weapons. They are attacked by droids and the Matron's daughter is killed. The Matron saves the others, but abandons Morgan. Cast: Matthew Wood as General Grievous, Lydia Look as the Matron, Cathy Ang as Morgan Elsbeth, Daisy Lightfoot as Nali, Diana Lee Inosanto as Selena, Suzie McGrath as witch #1, Meg Marchand as witch #2, and Gina Hermosillo as witch #3
2	"The Path of Anger"	Steward Lee	Story by : Dave Filoni; Written by : Amanda Rose Muñoz	May 4, 2024
During the reign of the Empire, Morgan becomes magistrate of the resource-rich planet Corvus and promises to bring jobs and prosperity for the local population. She designs a new TIE Defender fighter but her proposal to make it for the Empire is rejected by Moff Isdain. Admiral Thrawn takes an interest in the proposal and sends his assassin, Rukh, to attack Morgan. After she holds her own, Thrawn accepts her project and offers his assistance. Cast: Lars Mikkelsen as Admiral Thrawn, Xander Berkeley as Gilad Pellaeon, Tom Konkle as Moff Isdain and villager #1, Diana Lee Inosanto as Morgan Elsbeth, Warwick Davis as Rukh, Meg Marchand as villager #2, Shelby Young as villager #3, and Wing T. Chao as Wing
3	"The Path of Hate"	Nathaniel Villanueva	Story by : Dave Filoni; Written by : Amanda Rose Muñoz	May 4, 2024
After the fall of the Empire, (Note: As depicted in the film Return of the Jedi (1983)) former Corvus citizen Nadura returns as an ambassador of the New Republic. She demands that Morgan step down as magistrate, due to her mistreatment of the locals, and allow Corvus to join the New Republic. Morgan—who has received a vision that she believes is key to the future—kills Nadura and begins burning down Corvus's forests. Before she dies, Nadura sends a distress signal to Bo-Katan Kryze. Cast: Katee Sackhoff as Bo-Katan Kryze, Diana Lee Inosanto as Morgan Elsbeth, Shelby Young as Nadura, Steve Blum as a New Republic guard and Reggi, and Wing T. Chao as Wing
4	"Devoted"	Saul Ruiz	Story by : Dave Filoni; Written by : Nicolas Anasatassiou	May 4, 2024
Following Order 66 and the Galactic Republic's reorganization into the Empire, former Jedi Barriss Offee—who is serving a life sentence after turning on the Jedi Order and attacking the Jedi Temple (Note: As depicted in the fifth season of Star Wars: The Clone Wars (2012–13))—is brought to the under-construction Fortress Inquisitorius to be trained by the Grand Inquisitor. After she kills a fellow recruit in a duel, Barriss is welcomed as an Inquisitor and introduced to her new master, the Sith Lord Darth Vader. Cast: Zeno Robinson as Ahmar, Meredith Salenger as Barriss Offee, Dee Bradley Baker as a clone trooper, Nicolas Cantu as Dante, Rya Kihlstedt as Lyn Rakish / Fourth Sister, and Jason Isaacs as the Grand Inquisitor
5	"Realization"	Steward Lee	Story by : Dave Filoni; Written by : Matt Michnovetz	May 4, 2024
Barriss and the Fourth Sister, another Inquisitor, are sent to find a Jedi who is in hiding. They question some villagers and learn that the Jedi is on a nearby mountain. Barriss becomes disillusioned with the Empire when the Fourth Sister murders the villagers and then cuts down the Jedi after Barriss convinces them to surrender. Barriss uses the Force to push the Fourth Sister off the mountain and then aids the wounded Jedi. Cast: Meredith Salenger as Barriss Offee, Keith Ferguson as the governor, Rya Kihlstedt as Lyn Rakish / Fourth Sister, Ry Chase as the Jedi, and Jordyn Curet as the young girl
6	"The Way Out"	Nathaniel Villanueva	Story by : Dave Filoni; Written by : Matt Michnovetz	May 4, 2024
Years after leaving the Inquisitors, Barriss is a healer and teacher. She is visited by a family who are trying to protect their Force-sensitive child from the Fourth Sister, who follows them. Barriss traps the Fourth Sister in a maze as the family escapes, and attempts to convince her to turn to the light side of the Force. When she accidentally stabs Barriss with a lightsaber, the Fourth Sister feels regret and chooses to carry Barriss to safety. Cast: Steve Blum as attendant #1, Anna Graves as attendant #2, Meredith Salenger as Barriss Offee, Keston John as the father, Rya Kihlstedt as Lyn Rakish / Fourth Sister, and Suzie McGrath as the mother

=== Tales of the Underworld (2025) ===
No.	Title	Directed by	Written by	Original release date
1	"A Way Forward"	Saul Ruiz	Story by : Dave Filoni; Written by : Matt Michnovetz	May 4, 2025
After Asajj Ventress dies, (Note: As depicted in the novel Star Wars: Dark Disciple (2015)) her body is taken to Dathomir by Quinlan Vos and Obi-Wan Kenobi. Mother Talzin tells Ventress that she can return to life due to her love for Quinlan, but the price is her heart's desire; Ventress accepts this. During the Empire's reign, she reluctantly helps a young Padawan who is searching for "The Path", a secret route Quinlan established for surviving Jedi. They escape after fighting and killing an Inquisitor. Cast: Nika Futterman as Asajj Ventress, Tudi Roche as Cort, Daniel Ross as an Inquisitor, Barbara Goodson as Mother Talzin, Al Rodrigo as Quinlan Vos, Steve Blum as a smuggler and a stormtrooper, and Lane Factor as Lyco Strata
2	"Friends"	Steward Lee	Story by : Dave Filoni; Written by : Matt Michnovetz	May 4, 2025
Ventress and the Padawan, Lyco Strata, meet with the former's bounty hunter acquaintance Latts Razzi and her droid assassin C-21 Highsinger. In return for information about the Path, Razzi enlists Ventress and Lyco's help in stealing an Imperial shield relay unit. When the heist fails, Razzi and Highsinger attempt to collect a bounty on Lyco instead. Ventress stops them and forces Razzi to give them coordinates to the Path. Cast: Nika Futterman as Asajj Ventress, David Acord as C-21 Highsinger and Imperial tech #4, Lane Factor as Lyco Strata, David W. Collins as Imperial tech #1, Matthew Wood as Imperial tech #2, Helen Sadler as Imperial tech #3, Steve Blum as a stormtrooper, and Clare Grant as Latts Razzi
3	"One Warrior to Another"	Nathaniel Villanueva	Story by : Dave Filoni; Written by : Matt Michnovetz	May 4, 2025
On a desert planet, Ventress and Lyco encounter a former Separatist and his granddaughter who have been fighting a tribe of raiders over a water source. When the "raiders" attack again, Lyco is able to communicate with them. He and Ventress convince the man to stop fighting and share the water with the tribe. One of the tribesman directs the pair to the Path, but they decide not to go and instead continue travelling together. Cast: Nika Futterman as Asajj Ventress, Tony Amendola as the grandfather, Ellie Araiza as the granddaughter, Lane Factor as Lyco Strata, David W. Collins as raider #1, and Dee Bradley Baker as raider #2 and the raider elder
4	"The Good Life"	Saul Ruiz	Story by : Dave Filoni; Written by : Matt Michnovetz	May 4, 2025
A pair of young orphans, Colby and Niro, survive on the crime-ridden streets of Duro by scavenging and stealing. After a gangster named Lazlo gives them some money to spend on food, he offers them more to do a job for him. Niro is reluctant, but Colby agrees for a higher price. The orphans cause a distraction outside a casino, allowing Lazlo and his gang to rob the place. Colby escapes with the gang but Niro is caught by the police. Cast: David W. Collins as Blik, Kingpin, and a service droid, A. J. LoCascio as Colby, Philip Anthony-Rodriguez as Lazlo, Vanessa Marshall as a news reporter, and Eric Lopez as Niro
5	"A Good Turn"	Steward Lee	Story by : Dave Filoni; Written by : Matt Michnovetz	May 4, 2025
An adult Colby, now calling himself Cad Bane, returns to Duro with his girlfriend Arin after Lazlo is killed by the marshal there. He warns Niro, who is now the deputy marshal, to stay out of the way. Bane lures out the marshal, who tells Niro to stay away. Niro goes anyway and accidentally distracts the marshal, allowing Bane to kill him. Arin is injured in the crossfire. Wanting to save Bane's life, Arin disarms him so Niro can arrest him. Cast: Corey Burton as Cad Bane, Dawn-Lyen Gardner as Arin, Philip Anthony-Rodriguez as Lazlo, Imari Williams as the lawman, and Artt Butler as Niro
6	"One Good Deed"	Nathaniel Villanueva	Story by : Dave Filoni; Written by : Matt Michnovetz	May 4, 2025
Years after Bane was arrested, he is released from prison on a technicality and returns to Duro. In that time, Niro became the marshal, married Arin, and had a son named Isaac. Niro ignores warnings to leave town and insists that he can handle Bane. He confronts Bane and reveals that Arin died years earlier. Bane kills Niro in front of Isaac, who Bane realizes is his own biological child, and then leaves to continue his life as a bounty hunter. Cast: Corey Burton as Cad Bane, Oscar Camacho as the deputy, Michael Bell as a dock worker, Idris Keith as Isaac, Gwendoline Yeo as the mayor, and Artt Butler as Niro

== Production ==
=== Development ===
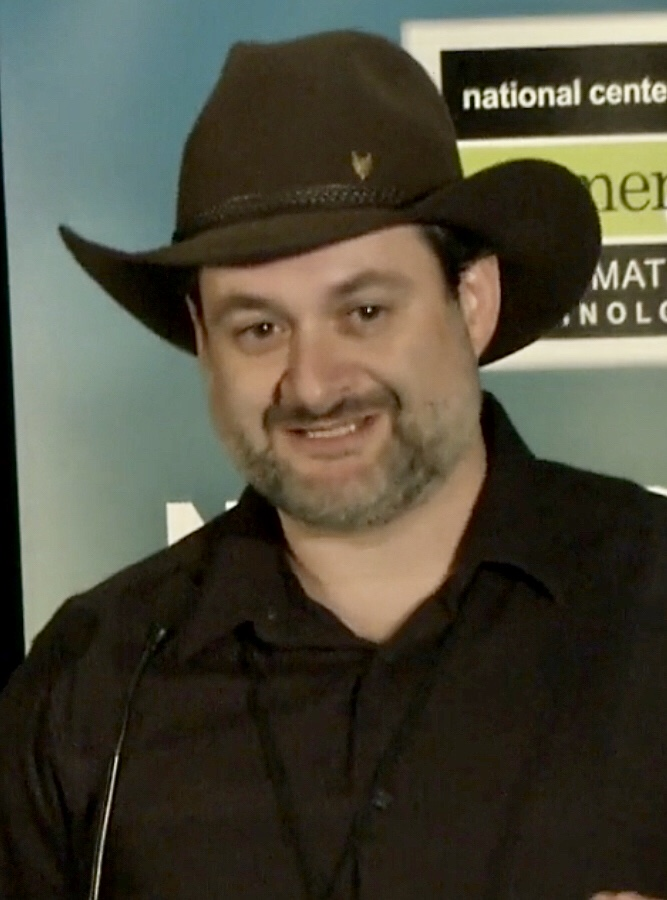
Creator and supervising director Dave Filoni

While traveling to work on the live-action Star Wars series The Mandalorian (2019–2023), executive producer Dave Filoni began writing short stories about different Jedi characters from the franchise's prequel trilogy era. Carrie Beck, senior vice president of development and production at Lucasfilm, asked if Filoni wanted to turn these into a series, which he compared to her "find[ing] the money" to revive his animated series Star Wars: The Clone Wars (2008–2020) for a final season on the streaming service Disney+. In December 2021, the logo for Tales of the Jedi was included on holiday gifts for Lucasfilm employees alongside logos for upcoming film and television projects at the studio. This was also the name of an unrelated comic book series published by Dark Horse Comics in the 1990s. Lucasfilm confirmed the project when announcing the schedule for Star Wars Celebration Anaheim in May 2022. Filoni discussed the animated anthology series in a dedicated panel, revealing that it consists of six shorts, five of which were written by Filoni and the other by The Clone Wars writer Charles Murray with Élan Murray. Each short is around 15 minutes long. Filoni also served as creator, supervising director, and executive producer, with Athena Yvette Portillo and Beck also as executive producers.

At Star Wars Celebration London in April 2023, Filoni announced that Tales of the Jedi would receive a second season. Star Wars: Tales of the Empire was announced a year later. Lucasfilm described it as the second installment of the "Tales franchise". The second set of six shorts were written by Amanda Rose Muñoz, Matt Michinovetz, and Nicolas Anastassiou from stories by Filoni. Star Wars: Tales of the Underworld was revealed in April 2025, and was referred to by Lucasfilm as "the third installment in the Tales anthology series" and a "third season of original shorts" after Tales of the Jedi and Tales of the Empire. Each of its six shorts were written by Michnovetz. Disney+ created a Star Wars Tales collection for the three series.

=== Writing ===
Filoni said the shorts were slower paced than episodes of The Clone Wars and called them "a series of tone poems" with less dialogue and more visual storytelling. This was inspired by the works of Hayao Miyazaki as well as Filoni's mentor, Star Wars creator George Lucas. Each installment explores "two paths and two choices". For Tales of the Jedi, one path follows Ahsoka Tano and the other focuses on Count Dooku. Each character is explored in three different eras of their lives. Tales of the Empire focuses on the characters Morgan Elsbeth and Barriss Offee, while Tales of the Underworld focuses on Asajj Ventress and Cad Bane.

Filoni's first idea for Tales of the Jedi was to show how Ahsoka was brought to the Jedi Order by Plo Koon, but he changed this to a story about Ahsoka's first hunting trip with her mother because there had not been many stories about "moms being moms" in Star Wars. He felt it was important that "Ahsoka's first experience with someone telling her, 'Don't be afraid', is her mother". Beyond the first episode, which has a happy ending and features the "adorable baby Ahsoka", Filoni warned that the series would not just be "fun, happy stories" and he felt that Dooku's life in particular was "surprisingly tragic". He attributed some of the series' darker episodes to them being written during the COVID-19 pandemic. An aspect of Dooku that Filoni wanted to explore was the relationship with his Padawan learner, Qui-Gon Jinn, whom Filoni found to be one of the most interesting Jedi due to his different philosophy from the Jedi Council. He asked, "where did [Qui-Gon] learn that, if not from his mentor, Count Dooku?" The final episode of Tales of the Jedi, "Resolve", loosely adapts the events of the 2016 novel Ahsoka by E. K. Johnston. Filoni explained that he based "Resolve" on the same outline that he had given Lucasfilm's publishing side for the novel, which is why the two projects tell the same story. Ashley Eckstein, the actress who voices Ahsoka, said the novel had not come into discussion while "Resolve" was in production but she regarded the episode to be an extension of the novel and the beginning of "that chapter" of Ahsoka's life.

=== Casting ===
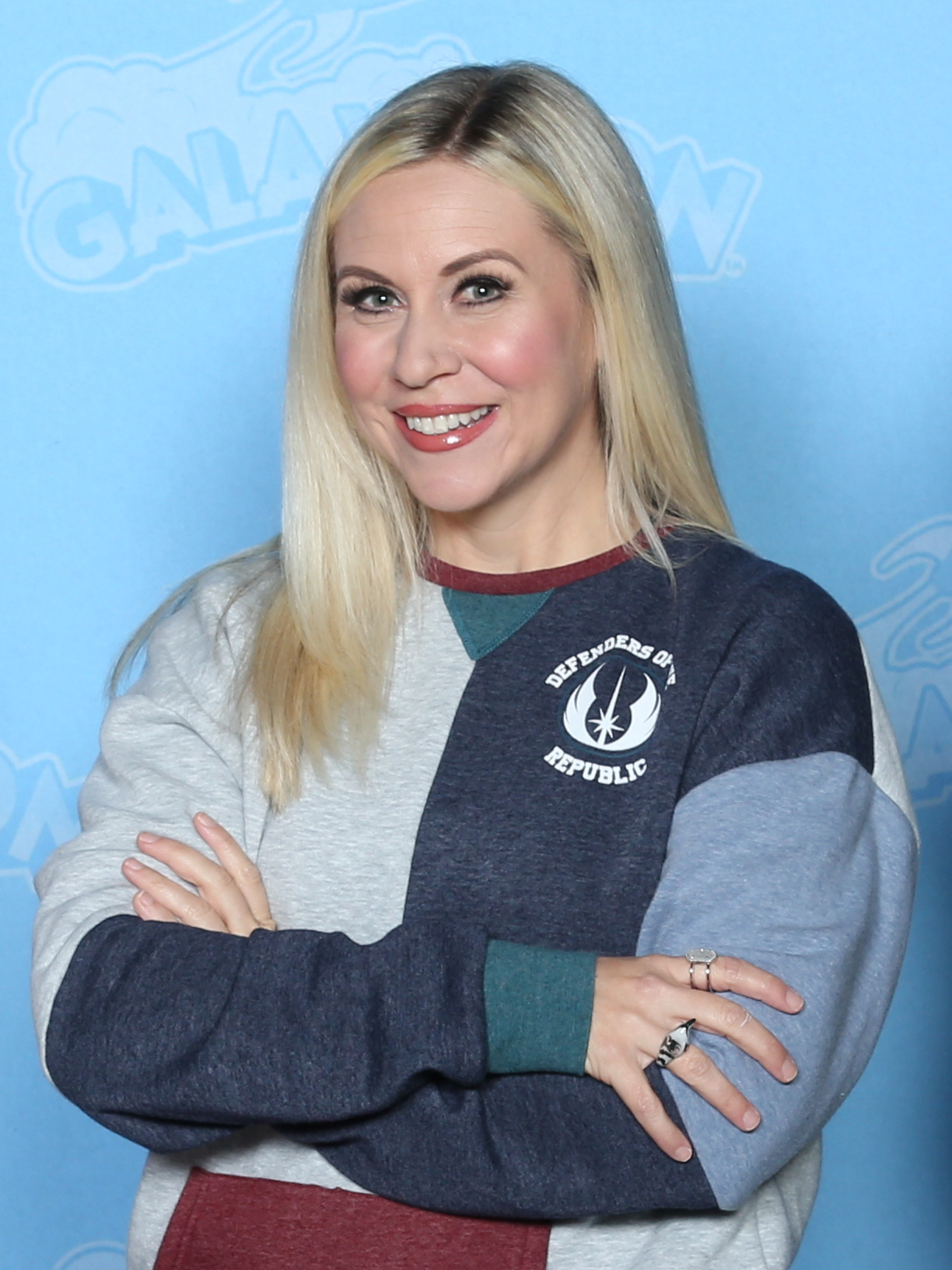
Ashley Eckstein voices Ahsoka Tano in Tales of the Jedi, one of many actors who returned from previous Star Wars media for the series.

Some casting was revealed with Tales of the Jedi's announcement in May 2022: Liam Neeson reprising his role as Qui-Gon Jinn from the Star Wars films; his son, Micheál Richardson, as a younger version of the character; Matt Lanter reprising his role as Anakin Skywalker from The Clone Wars; and Janina Gavankar, who voiced Iden Versio in the video game Star Wars Battlefront II (2017), as Ahsoka's mother Pav-ti. In July 2022, Eckstein said she was reprising her role as Ahsoka from The Clone Wars. A day before the series was released, Bryce Dallas Howard announced that she was voicing the Star Wars film character Yaddle in the series; Howard, a fan of the animated Star Wars series, was approached for the role by Filoni after they worked together on The Mandalorian. Also reprising their Star Wars roles in Tales of the Jedi are Corey Burton as Count Dooku, TC Carson as Mace Windu, Ian McDiarmid as Darth Sidious, James Arnold Taylor as Obi-Wan Kenobi, Phil LaMarr as Bail Organa, and Dee Bradley Baker as Captain Rex, Jesse, and other clone troopers. Clancy Brown voices an Inquisitor.

When Tales of the Empire was revealed in April 2024, several voice actors were set to reprise their Star Wars roles: Diana Lee Inosanto as Morgan Elsbeth, Meredith Salenger as Barriss Offee, Rya Kihlstedt as the Fourth Sister, Wing T. Chao as Governor Wing, Lars Mikkelsen as Admiral Thrawn, Jason Isaacs as the Grand Inquisitor, and Matthew Wood as General Grievous. In the first short, Cathy Ang voices a younger version of Morgan while Inosanto voices her mother, Selena. Also reprising their Star Wars roles in Tales of the Empire are Xander Berkeley as Gilad Pellaeon, Warwick Davis as Rukh, Katee Sackhoff as Bo-Katan Kryze, and Baker as a clone trooper. Darth Vader, Marrok, and the Inquisitor from Tales of the Jedi also appear.

For Tales of the Underworld, Nika Futterman and Burton reprise their respective roles as Asajj Ventress and Cad Bane. Other voice actors announced for the series were Artt Butler, Lane Factor, AJ LoCascio, Clare Grant, Dawn-Lyen Gardner, and Eric Lopez. Grant reprised her role as Latts Razzi from The Clone Wars. Also reprising their Star Wars roles in Tales of the Underworld are Barbara Goodson as Mother Talzin and Al Rodrigo as Quinlan Vos.

=== Animation and design ===
The series use the same animation style as The Clone Wars; work on Tales of the Jedi overlapped with the final season of The Clone Wars and the start of Star Wars: The Bad Batch (2021–2024). Animation supervisor Keith Kellogg, cinematography and effects lead Joel Aron, and sound designer David W. Collins all returned from previous Lucasfilm Animation projects. Charles Murray, Nathaniel Villanueva, and Saul Ruiz directed the Tales of the Jedi shorts, Villanueva, Ruiz, and Steward Lee directed the Tales of the Empire shorts, and Villanueva, Ruiz, and Lee directed the Tales of the Underworld shorts.

Aron said the Lucasfilm Animation team, working with animation provider CGCG, Inc., were "pushing the limits of what we can do within our sandbox" to make each new project as cinematic as possible. With Tales of the Jedi, Aron chose to change the "lensing style" of the animation to the wide-screen anamorphic format used by many live-action films, including Lucasfilm's first production American Graffiti (1973), which allowed for "a refined depth of field and ability to artificially add layers of film grain". This approach was then carried over to The Bad Batch. After they successfully used some practical effects in the latter, the team did the same with Tales of the Empire: for an establishing shot on the planet Dathomir, a physical model of a mountain range was filmed in front of an oil-painted background. A computer-generated set was added later by the animators.

=== Music ===
Kevin Kiner composed the music for Tales of the Jedi, returning from The Clone Wars, Star Wars Rebels (2014–2018), and The Bad Batch. As with the other animated Star Wars series, Kevin collaborated with his children Sean and Deana. David Glen Russell and Peter Lam also provided additional music for Tales of the Jedi. Sean and Deana are credited as co-composers with Kevin starting with Tales of the Empire.

The Kiners started with the three Ahsoka shorts. For Ahsoka's younger years in the first two shorts, Kevin wanted to call back to his earliest material for the character in the film Star Wars: The Clone Wars (2008). He had to review the original compositions because it had been nearly 16 years since he started working with the character, and put a particular focus on woodwind instruments. For Ahsoka's third short, Sean and Deana created a new variation of Kevin's Ahsoka theme to represent her new status as a rōnin. Because Filoni was influenced by the works of Studio Ghibli and other Japanese cinema, they studied the music of samurai films when creating this new variation. They later expanded on this rōnin motif and the Japanese influences in the score for Ahsoka (2023–present). They did not try to repeat the Japanese influences for Dooku's shorts, but Kevin felt some of those sensibilities carried over. Because Star Wars film composer John Williams did not make a theme for Dooku, the Kiners created a new theme that represents his fall to the dark side of the Force. It gets darker across the three shorts. When Yaddle follows Dooku in his final short, they revisited some of the synthesizer sounds that they used for the final season of The Clone Wars, along with some "experimental" vocal work.

A soundtrack album for Tales of the Jedi was released digitally by Walt Disney Records on October 26, 2022, alongside the series' premiere. An album for Tales of the Empire was released on May 10, 2024, and an album for Tales of the Underworld was released on May 9, 2025.

All music is composed by Kevin Kiner:

Star Wars: Tales of the Jedi (Original Soundtrack)
No.	Title	Length
1.	"Birth of Ahsoka"	1:33
2.	"Ahsoka's Village"	2:47
3.	"Sanctity of Life"	2:45
4.	"Tiger"	2:19
5.	"The Bond"	2:33
6.	"Ahsoka Returns"	2:59
7.	"A Real Test"	3:28
8.	"Let's Go Again"	2:19
9.	"Training Pays Off"	1:36
10.	"Secret Mourner"	2:10
11.	"No One Is Safe"	4:13
12.	"The Inquisitor"	3:45
13.	"Ahsoka Is Ready"	1:13
14.	"Dooku Arrives"	2:44
15.	"The Kidnappers"	2:34
16.	"Soldiers Are Here"	4:52
17.	"No More Suffering"	2:24
18.	"Murder Case"	2:25
19.	"Mystery in Raxus"	2:09
20.	"Dooku Investigates"	3:10
21.	"Dooku Contemplates"	2:33
22.	"Qui-Gon and the Sith Lord"	4:59
23.	"Flight Into Darkness"	4:04
24.	"Dooku vs. Yaddle"	3:16
25.	"Dooku's Fall"	2:45
Total length:		71:14

All music is composed by Kevin, Sean, and Deana Kiner:

Star Wars: Tales of the Empire (Original Soundtrack)
No.	Title	Length
1.	"Invasion of Dathomir"	4:30
2.	"The Mountain Clan"	2:17
3.	"Right to Be Scared"	1:40
4.	"Hunt for Weapons"	2:48
5.	"Morgan Leaves"	1:24
6.	"Deal Rejected"	2:53
7.	"Back to Corvus"	2:17
8.	"Assassin Attack"	1:56
9.	"Anger Gives Me Strength"	3:37
10.	"Nadura Arrives"	3:43
11.	"Fulfill My Destiny"	1:50
12.	"The Fires Will Continue Burning"	2:47
13.	"Help Will Come"	1:23
14.	"Morgan Elsbeth – End Credits"	0:52
15.	"Barriss Released"	2:47
16.	"Prove Yourself Worthy"	2:36
17.	"Come With Me"	1:27
18.	"One Final Test"	2:42
19.	"Welcome Sister"	2:48
20.	"New Target"	1:50
21.	"Where's the Jedi"	3:31
22.	"Inquisitors vs. Jedi"	2:16
23.	"You're Not Alone"	2:33
24.	"Seek the Healer"	2:13
25.	"Such Gifts Are a Curse"	1:54
26.	"Live, Now Go"	2:35
27.	"Lyn Attacks"	1:48
28.	"Inside the Cave"	3:04
29.	"The Way Out"	2:01
30.	"Barriss Offee – End Credits"	0:46
Total length:		71:00

All music is composed by Kevin, Sean, and Deana Kiner:

Star Wars: Tales of the Underworld (Original Soundtrack)
No.	Title	Length
1.	"Asajj Ventress – Opening"	0:18
2.	"The Burial"	3:33
3.	"Why I Took the Job"	1:59
4.	"Keep Quiet"	2:26
5.	"On the Run"	1:55
6.	"Ventress vs. The Inquisitor"	2:25
7.	"My Name Is Asajj Ventress"	1:16
8.	"Looking for Quinlan Vos"	2:12
9.	"Latts Razzi"	2:53
10.	"Shipyard Infiltration"	2:54
11.	"Exit Strategy"	3:33
12.	"I Trust You"	0:57
13.	"Out of Water"	2:54
14.	"One Warrior to Another"	2:23
15.	"Canyon Ambush"	3:08
16.	"Another Way"	2:21
17.	"Farewell Lyco"	2:17
18.	"Better Off with You"	1:25
19.	"Asajj Ventress – End Credits"	0:50
20.	"Cad Bane – Opening"	0:16
21.	"Street Rat Brothers"	2:19
22.	"An Investment"	2:07
23.	"We Earned It"	2:17
24.	"An Opportunity"	1:53
25.	"Good News Bad News"	2:53
26.	"Who Did This"	2:21
27.	"Back in Town"	2:23
28.	"Be Ready"	3:18
29.	"No Way Out"	2:38
30.	"The Crew Is Back"	2:23
31.	"Marshall to Stay"	1:47
32.	"At the Council"	1:41
33.	"Bane Arrives"	2:16
34.	"Isaac"	1:15
35.	"One Good Deed"	2:59
36.	"Bane Walks Away"	1:40
37.	"Cad Bane – End Credits"	0:49
Total length:		78:00

== Marketing ==
Filoni revealed the first details about Tales of the Jedi at a Star Wars Celebration panel in May 2022, where a teaser was shown and the full first episode was screened. Key art posters released for each installment feature a group of characters in front of a relevant symbol: for Tales of the Jedi, the symbol of the Jedi Order; for Tales of the Empire, the Imperial "cog" symbol; and for Tales of the Underworld, the "credit" currency symbol. Tales of the Underworld's first episode was screened during a Lucasfilm Animation panel at Star Wars Celebration Japan in April 2025, and its first two episodes were made available in the video game Fortnite from May 2–11.

== Release ==
Tales of the Jedi was released on Disney+ on October 26, 2022, with all six of its episodes. Tales of the Empire was released on May 4, 2024, and Tales of the Underworld was released on May 4, 2025.

== Reception ==
=== Viewership ===
According to Parrot Analytics, which looks at consumer engagement in consumer research, streaming, downloads, and on social media, Tales of the Jedi was the 4th most in-demand streaming show in the United States during the week of October 29, 2022, to November 4, 2022. According to Whip Media's TV Time, Tales of the Jedi was the 9th most streamed original series across all platforms in the United States during the week ending October 30, 2022.

=== Critical response ===
Critical response of Show
Series	Rotten Tomatoes	Metacritic
Tales of the Jedi	100% (22 reviews)	78 (6 reviews)
Tales of the Empire	88% (25 reviews)	76 (5 reviews)
Tales of the Underworld	100% (13 reviews)	70 (5 reviews)

The review aggregator website Rotten Tomatoes reported an approval rating of 100% for Tales of the Jedi, based on 22 reviews. The website's critics consensus reads, "Under the reliable stewardship of Dave Filoni, Tales of the Jedi is an absorbing expansion of Star Wars lore that will delight Padawan-level fans and encyclopedic Force scholars alike." On Metacritic, which uses a weighted average, Tales of the Jedi has a score of 78 out of 100 based on 6 reviews, indicating "generally favorable" reviews.

Brian Young of /Film asserted, "These episodes are full of pathos and interesting connections to the broader Star Wars lore. The quality of work from the writers, from Lucasfilm Animation, and the music of Kevin Kiner has never been better. My hope is that these mini-episodes are popular enough to spin more Jedi into the limelight for more tales." Kevin Fox Jr. of Paste gave the series a grade of 8.2 out of 10, stating, "The overall result, as overseen by Dave Filoni, is surprising and strong. Tales of the Jedi succeeds by saying exactly what it means to and then making its exit, sure to have viewers ready for more. Whether it's ultimately a one-off season or the start of something greater, it's worth Star Wars fans' time to check it out." Jamie Lovett of ComicBook.com gave the series a grade of 4 out of 5, saying, "These six Tales of the Jedi are beautiful, moving, and deceptively layered for their brevity while packing a few surprises and jaw-dropping moments along the way. Lucasfilm Animation managed to squeeze a lot of Star Wars magic into these shorts, and viewers will only be disappointed that there aren't more of them." Alex Stedman of IGN gave the series a grade of 8 out of 10, writing, "Tales of the Jedi is a strong, tightly written showcase for two important characters in Star Wars lore: Count Dooku and Ahsoka Tano. Dooku in particular gets a good amount of meat added to his character's bones, while the other episodes feature a welcome look into Ahsoka at different points in her life. It's moody and methodical at times, while still managing to weave in some beautifully animated action. It may not be absolutely vital Star Wars content, but there are certainly worse ways to revisit these characters before Ahsoka gets her own series."

For Tales of the Empire, Rotten Tomatoes reported an approval rating of 88% based on 25 reviews. The website's critics consensus reads, "Star Wars takes a walk on the Dark Side in this fleet and filling animated series, which conjures just enough excitement to get fans' lightsabers rattling." On Metacritic, Tales of the Empire has a score of 76 out of 100 based on 5 reviews, again indicating "generally favorable" reviews. Rotten Tomatoes reported an approval rating of 100% based on 13 reviews for Tales of the Underworld. On Metacritic, the series has a score of 70 out of 100 based on 5 reviews, once again indicating "generally favorable" reviews.

=== Accolades ===
Tales of the Jedi was nominated for Outstanding Achievement in Sound Editing – Broadcast Animation at the 2023 Golden Reel Awards, and for Outstanding Short-Form Program at the 2023 Producers Guild of America Awards. The Tales of the Empire short "Devoted" was selected for presentation as part of the Television Films competition at the 2025 Annecy International Animation Film Festival.
