= Count Dooku =

Fictional character in Star Wars

- Star Wars character
- Christopher Lee as Count Dooku
- First appearance: Attack of the Clones (2002)
- Created by: George Lucas
- Portrayed by: Christopher Lee (Note: Attack of the Clones Revenge of the Sith)
- Voiced by: Christopher Lee (Note: The Clone Wars (film)); Jeff Bennett (Note: Star Wars: Jedi Starfighter); Corey Burton (Note: The Clone Wars (series) Clone Wars Various video games); Michael Donovan (Note: Lego Star Wars: The Yoda Chronicles Lego Star Wars: Droid Tales); Euan Morton (Note: Dooku: Jedi Lost)

In-universe information
- Full name: Dooku
- Alias: Darth Tyranus
- Species: Human
- Gender: Male
- Title: Count of Serenno
- Occupation: Jedi Master; Sith Lord; Head of State of the CIS (Note: Confederacy of Independent Systems)
- Affiliation: Jedi Order; Galactic Republic; Sith Order; CIS; House of Serenno
- Family: Count Gora (father); Countess Anya (mother); Count Ramil (older brother); Jenza (younger sister)
- Masters: Yoda (as a Jedi); Darth Sidious (as a Sith)
- Apprentices: Jedi: Rael Averross; Qui-Gon Jinn; Sith: Asajj Ventress; Savage Opress; Quinlan Vos
- Homeworld: Serenno

Count Dooku, also known as Darth Tyranus (/tɪˈrænəs/ tih-RA-nəs), is a character in the Star Wars franchise. He was introduced in the prequel film trilogy, appearing in Attack of the Clones (2002) and Revenge of the Sith (2005). He is portrayed by Christopher Lee in both films, while Corey Burton provided the character's voice in most of his video game and animated appearances. The animated productions include the television series Clone Wars (2003–2005), The Clone Wars (2008–2014; 2020), and Tales of the Jedi (2022). Lee reprised his role as Dooku in the 2008 animated film, Star Wars: The Clone Wars. The character has also appeared in various Star Wars novels and comics.

Dooku is the Count of Serenno, his home planet. He is also a former Jedi Master who was trained by Yoda and mentored Qui-Gon Jinn. He becomes disillusioned with the Galactic Senate and the Jedi Order due to the former's corruption and the latter's complicity, and eventually turns to the dark side of the Force. He becomes an apprentice of the Sith Lord Darth Sidious and plays a pivotal role in his master's rise to power. Dooku leads the Confederacy of Independent Systems throughout the Clone Wars, all the while engineering the creation of the Republic's clone army. Although he hopes to eventually overthrow Sidious, Dooku is betrayed by his master and killed by Anakin Skywalker, who would succeed him as Sidious's apprentice, becoming Darth Vader.

== Development ==
In his autobiography, Christopher Lee stated that the origin of Count Dooku's name was "doku", the Japanese word for "poison".

== Appearances ==
=== Films ===
==== Attack of the Clones ====
Count Dooku is introduced in Attack of the Clones (2002) as a former Jedi Master who left the Jedi Order after losing faith in it and the Galactic Republic it served. He became the leader of the Confederacy of Independent Systems, a confederation of planetary systems rebelling against the Republic. Dooku believes that the Republic is corrupt and imposes excessive taxation, that its politicians are more interested in maintaining the bureaucracy and enriching themselves than in properly representing their people, as well as believing that they are more focused on the Republic-centric Core Worlds and neglecting the others.

Dooku recruits the bounty hunter Jango Fett to assassinate Senator Padmé Amidala on Coruscant, but the attempt is foiled by her Jedi protectors. At the Separatists' secret headquarters on Geonosis, Dooku captures and interrogates Jedi Knight Obi-Wan Kenobi, the former apprentice of Dooku's late pupil, Qui-Gon Jinn. Dooku asserts that the Galactic Senate is secretly under the influence of a Sith Lord named Darth Sidious and that he is attempting to save the Republic, offering Obi-Wan a chance to join him. When Padmé and Anakin Skywalker arrive on Geonosis to rescue Obi-Wan, Dooku captures them as well and sentences all three to death.

A Jedi strike team eventually arrives to rescue the trio and is soon joined by the Republic's new clone army, resulting in a large battle between the Republic and Separatist forces. Dooku tries to flee, but Obi-Wan and Anakin follow him and engage him in a lightsaber duel. Dooku subdues Anakin with Force lightning, wounds Obi-Wan, and cuts off Anakin's right arm. Dooku's former master Yoda then arrives, and the two duel. Unable to match Yoda's prowess, Dooku distracts him by using the Force to dislodge a large pillar and send it falling toward Anakin and Obi-Wan. While Yoda is saving the two injured Jedi, Dooku escapes the planet. He brings the designs for the Death Star to his master Darth Sidious, informing him that the war has begun and that their plan is working.

==== Revenge of the Sith ====
Revenge of the Sith (2005) takes place three years after Attack of the Clones. Dooku and the Separatist commander General Grievous have kidnapped Supreme Chancellor Palpatine—Sidious's alter ego—as part of a plan orchestrated by Palpatine to lure Anakin to the dark side of the Force. Unknown to Dooku, Palpatine's true plan is to have Anakin kill him and take his place as Palpatine's apprentice, having sensed Anakin's potential. After Anakin and Obi-Wan board Grievous's ship to rescue Palpatine, Dooku confronts and engages them in a duel. He knocks Obi-Wan unconscious but is overpowered by Anakin, who disarms him and severs his hands. As Dooku is left at Anakin's mercy, Palpatine urges the latter to kill Dooku; Anakin reluctantly complies and beheads the defeated Sith Lord, bringing him one step closer to the dark side.

In a deleted scene, Dooku claims that he arranged for Tusken Raiders to kidnap and kill Anakin's mother, as seen in Attack of the Clones.

==== The Clone Wars ====
In the 2008 animated film The Clone Wars, which takes place shortly after the events of Attack of the Clones, Dooku plots to bring Jabba the Hutt into the fold of the Confederacy. He orchestrates the kidnapping of Jabba's son Rotta by Jabba's uncle Ziro. When Jabba requests Jedi assistance to rescue his son, Dooku plans to frame the Jedi for the kidnapping. On Tatooine, Dooku duels Anakin for the first time since their encounter in Attack of the Clones. The duel ends in a draw, and Anakin and his apprentice Ahsoka Tano eventually foil Dooku's plan.

=== Television ===
==== The Clone Wars (2008–2014) ====
In the 2008 animated series Star Wars: The Clone Wars, set between Attack of the Clones and Revenge of the Sith, Dooku is the political leader of the Separatists and the main antagonist. In addition to sending General Grievous and Asajj Ventress on missions to antagonize the Republic, he works with the terrorist group Death Watch to give the Republic a reason to send a military presence to Mandalore, which would play in his favor. The plan falls through when Duchess Satine Kryze of Mandalore urges the Galactic Senate to hold off a military force.

In the third season, Dooku is forced to eliminate his apprentice Ventress to prove his loyalty to Darth Sidious. Ventress survives, however, and works with Mother Talzin to kill Dooku by giving him Savage Opress as a replacement apprentice. During a confrontation between Dooku and Ventress, Savage turns on both. In the fourth season, Dooku defeats Anakin in three separate lightsaber duels, and despite having some of his plans foiled, he gets his revenge on Ventress by having Grievous carry out the systematic genocide of the Nightsisters. In the fifth season, Dooku plays minor roles via hologram in guiding King Rash of Onderon and Grievous taking over Florrum.

In the sixth season, Dooku finds out the clone trooper Tup executed Order 66 prematurely due to a malfunction in his inhibitor chip, which he and Sidious had instilled in the clones to compel them to turn against the Jedi at the right time. To prevent the Jedi from discovering his and Sidious's plan, he works behind the scenes to stop the Republic's investigation. Dooku then manipulates the Banking Clan and its representative Rush Clovis into putting all their resources in the hands of the Sith, bringing war to the planet Scipio. Later, the Jedi find a lightsaber belonging to deceased Jedi Master Sifo-Dyas—whom Dooku betrayed and murdered years earlier—and start an investigation. Sidious forces Dooku to clean up their trail. Dooku confronts Anakin and Obi-Wan on Oba Diah, revealing his alter ego, Darth Tyranus, to the Jedi and his role in the creation of the clone army. Further investigation by Yoda prompts Dooku and Sidious to perform a Sith ritual in an unsuccessful attempt to break the Jedi Master; in a vision experienced by Yoda, Dooku fights Anakin, who swiftly defeats and executes him, in a manner very similar to his eventual demise.

Dooku does not directly appear in the seventh season. However, as the events of Revenge of the Sith are concurrent with the season's final arc, Ahsoka Tano is informed of his demise at Anakin's hands by Obi-Wan, who tells her that it is important to capture Maul, being the only way the Jedi can discover the true identity of Darth Sidious after Dooku's death.

==== Tales of the Jedi (2022) ====
A younger Count Dooku serves as one of the two protagonists of the animated miniseries Tales of the Jedi, voiced again by Corey Burton. He is the focus of the second, third, and fourth episodes, which depict his life as a Jedi, his increasing dissatisfaction with the corruption in the Jedi Order and the Galactic Senate, and his eventual fall to the dark side. The miniseries also focuses on Dooku's friendship with his apprentice Qui-Gon Jinn, with original actor Liam Neeson returning to voice the character in the episode set concurrently to The Phantom Menace.

=== Novels ===
==== Dark Disciple (2015) ====
An unfinished sixth season arc of The Clone Wars was adapted into the 2015 novel Dark Disciple by Christie Golden. In the story, Dooku commands a genocidal attack on the planet Mahranee, leading the Jedi Council to send Master Quinlan Vos on a mission to assassinate Dooku. Vos partners with Dooku's former apprentice Asajj Ventress for the mission. The two confront Dooku on the planet Raxus Secundus, where Dooku was being awarded at a ceremony, but are no match for the Sith Lord, who captures Vos and forces Ventress to flee. Dooku takes Vos to Serenno, where he tortures him, eventually turning him to the dark side. Sometime later, the Jedi Council liberates Vos with the assistance of Ventress. However, upon deducing that he has turned to the dark side, the Council sends him to face Dooku again as a test of loyalty, with Obi-Wan Kenobi and Anakin Skywalker tailing him. Vos defeats Dooku, but spares his life and instead demands Dooku to lead him to Darth Sidious. Obi-Wan and Anakin arrest them both. Vos and Dooku escape aboard Ventress's ship, killing two Jedi and many clone troopers in the process. They are shot down and crash-land on Christophsis, where they seek refuge in a Separatist tower, which is soon under attack by Jedi and Republic forces. Dooku attempts to kill Vos with Force lightning, but Ventress sacrifices her life and saves Vos. After killing Ventress, Dooku escapes the planet.

==== Thrawn: Alliances (2018) ====
In the 2018 novel Thrawn: Alliances, Dooku is mentioned by Duke Solha and Padmé Amidala while they fight at Mokivj. Solha establishes that the Count had dispatched him and his siblings to Mokivj to produce cortosis B2 super battle droids for the Clone Wars.

==== Master & Apprentice (2019) ====
The novel Master & Apprentice by Claudia Gray, set eight years prior to the events of The Phantom Menace, recounts several adventures from Qui-Gon Jinn's apprenticeship under Dooku, as well as Dooku's obsession with Jedi prophecies and seeming use of Force lightning during a mission. Dooku, at this point, has already left the Jedi Order. The novel also reveals that Dooku had one other apprentice before Qui-Gon, Rael Averross.

==== Dooku: Jedi Lost (2019) ====
The audiobook Dooku: Jedi Lost by Cavan Scott explores Dooku's childhood, training as a Jedi, and the various missions he undertook for the Order, as well as the beginning of his fall to the dark side. As an infant, Dooku is disowned by his father, Count Gora of Serenno, due to his Force-sensitivity and is taken in by the Jedi Order. Years later, while a Jedi Initiate, Dooku visits his homeworld and meets his father, his sister Jenza, and his brother Ramil. He begins corresponding with Jenza, keeping their communications a secret for years. As Dooku continues his Jedi training, he goes on multiple adventures with his best friend Sifo-Dyas and the latter's Jedi Master, Lene Kostana. During one mission at the age of 20, Dooku sees visions of many different futures through the Force, one of which is his eventual turn to the Sith, which shakes him to the core. Eventually, Dooku becomes a Jedi Knight, trains two Padawans to knighthood, and joins the Jedi Council, hoping to bring about real change in the Republic. However, after he saves his homeworld of Serenno from invaders at the age of 60, he decides to stay and help his planet rebuild, leaving the Jedi Order and becoming Count Dooku of Serenno.

== Star Wars Legends ==
Following the acquisition of Lucasfilm by The Walt Disney Company in 2012, most of the licensed Star Wars novels and comics produced between 1977 and 2014 were rebranded as Star Wars Legends and declared non-canon to the franchise. The Legends works comprise a separate narrative universe. (Note: Attributed to multiple references:)

=== Comics ===
In the Star Wars: Republic series, set during the Clone Wars, Dooku trains multiple Dark Jedi apprentices, most of whom he uses as minions. His apprentices include Asajj Ventress, Tol Skorr, and renegade Jedi Quinlan Vos. Vos initially intended to infiltrate the Separatists as a spy for the Jedi Council but instead nearly falls to the dark side.

=== Novels ===
In Jude Watson's Legacy of the Jedi, Dooku appears in Parts 1, 2, and 4, and is mentioned in Part 3. In Part 1, he is first tempted by the dark side of the Force as a child when his best friend and fellow Padawan Lorian Nod steals an ancient Sith Holocron from the Jedi Archives. When Nod is caught, Nod lies and says that the theft was Dooku's idea. However, Dooku manages to convince the Jedi Council of the truth, and Nod is then expelled from the Jedi Order. It is later implied that Dooku himself steals the Holocron because he is intrigued by the Sith's open embrace of power. In Part 2, set 13 years later, he is a Jedi Knight, and takes Qui-Gon Jinn as his Padawan apprentice. He encounters Nod while defending a Senator from space pirates, and defeats him in combat, almost executing him. However, Qui-Gon convinces him to spare Nod's life, and he and Dooku turn Nod over to the authorities. In Part 3, set 32 years later, Qui-Gon, now a Jedi Knight, remarks that he has not seen Dooku in years, noting that their relationship was never friendly. Finally in Part 4, set in the midst of the Clone Wars, Dooku, now a Sith, kills Nod after his former friend refuses to join the Separatists.

In Sean Stewart's Yoda: Dark Rendezvous, Dooku attempts to trap Yoda by offering to negotiate an end to the Clone Wars. Dooku attempts unsuccessfully to sway Yoda to his cause, while Yoda nearly convinces Dooku to return to the Jedi Order. When Anakin and Obi-Wan appear unexpectedly, Dooku believes that Yoda was trying to set him up to be captured, and renounces his former master once and for all. In the novel, it is also revealed that Dooku always resented his parents for "giving him away" to the Jedi Order.

In James Luceno's Labyrinth of Evil, Dooku engineers Grievous's transformation into a cyborg and trains him in lightsaber combat. He then schemes with Sidious to invade Coruscant in what he believes to be a plot to kill Obi-Wan and initiate Anakin into the Sith.

Matthew Stover's novelization of Revenge of the Sith expands upon Dooku's character; it portrays him as an evil man who sees others as mere objects to be used and discarded, and who despises the galaxy's non-human species and plans to exterminate and enslave them once in power. It also explains that Dooku believes that Palpatine's staged kidnapping is part of a plan to kill Obi-Wan and turn Anakin to the dark side. In this scenario, once the Republic becomes the Galactic Empire, Dooku and Palpatine will rule the galaxy together, while Anakin will command a "Sith Army" formed from the remains of the Jedi. The novelization depicts Dooku's death scene from his point of view after realizing that Sidious has betrayed and used him. In his final moments, he realizes that Palpatine used him as a means to engineer the war and as a placeholder for Anakin, whom he intended to be his apprentice all along. He ultimately realizes that everything he has done has been all for nothing, before being ruthlessly executed by Skywalker.

=== Clone Wars (2003–2005) ===
During the 2003 animated micro-series Star Wars: Clone Wars, Count Dooku leads the Separatists from behind the scenes, taking the dark assassin Asajj Ventress as his apprentice while training General Grievous in lightsaber combat. In the final episode, he plays a part in Grievous's attack on Coruscant and kidnapping Palpatine, setting the stage for Revenge of the Sith.

=== Toys ===
A number of toys based on Count Dooku have been produced, including the Lego set Duel on Geonosis, which recreates the lightsaber duel between Yoda and Dooku from Attack of the Clones, and a Hasbro Count Dooku lightsaber.
