= Star Wars Databank =

The Star Wars Databank is the official Star Wars website's reference guide to elements such as characters, locations and technology included in the franchise's canon films and television series.

Before the canon restructuring in 2014, each article progressed by describing the subject's incarnation in the movies if applicable, and moving on to Expanded Universe material; finally, there was often a "Behind the Scenes" section which described the subject's real-world history, inspiration, and production.
