= Labyrinth of Evil =

2005 novel by James Luceno

- Author: James Luceno
- Language: English
- Subject: Star Wars
- Genre: Science fiction
- Publisher: Del Rey
- Publication date: Hardcover: January 25, 2005; Paperback: September 27, 2005
- Publication place: United States
- Media type: Hardcover & Paperback
- Pages: Hardcover: 352; Paperback: 384
- ISBN: 0-345-47572-0 (hardcover); ISBN 0-345-47573-9 (paperback)
- Preceded by: Boba Fett: Pursuit
- Followed by: Star Wars: Episode III – Revenge of the Sith

Star Wars: Labyrinth of Evil is a 2005 novel by James Luceno set in the fictional Star Wars universe. The novel serves as a lead-in to Star Wars: Episode III – Revenge of the Sith, and was loosely adapted into Volume Two of the Star Wars: Clone Wars microseries.

== Plot ==
On the planet Cato Neimoidia, Jedi generals Obi-Wan Kenobi and Anakin Skywalker lead clone troopers to capture Nute Gunray, Trade Federation viceroy and one of the leaders of the Separatists. Gunray narrowly escapes to rendezvous with General Grievous and the rest of the Separatist Council, but he leaves behind his walking chair equipped with a specially-constructed holotransceiver. Republic analysts find the afterimage of Darth Sidious, the Sith Lord who masterminded the Clone Wars. However, this puts the Jedi no closer to finding Sidious himself.

While Kenobi and Skywalker pursue the constructor of the chair, General Grievous is commanded by Sidious through his apprentice Count Dooku to relocate the Separatist Council to Belderone, where a Republic fleet lies in wait for them. Furious, Grievous learns that Gunray lost the holotransceiver. Republic Intelligence find the signature of the artist that designed the mechno-chair that Sidious provided Gunray. Kenobi and Skywalker seek out the artist, a Xi Charrian, who tells them to find the designer, contracted by Sidious, to build the holotransceiver built into the mechno-chair. The Jedi find the designer in a prison, where he tells them that he built two holotransceivers, one for the mechno-chair, another for a ship of unknown design. The designer knows the identity of the pilot that delivered the ship to its owners (Darth Maul and Sidious). The pilot, a Lethan Twi'lek, is discovered on a moon by the Jedi, and she describes to the Jedi the location of the delivered ship: a columnar building in The Works, a desolate industrial park on Coruscant.

On Coruscant, Supreme Chancellor Palpatine resists the Jedi Council's suggestion to recall Jedi from the Outer Rim worlds due to the Separatist threat. Palpatine's increased calls for public surveillance and restriction on freedom of movement and action prompt Senators Padmé Amidala, Bail Organa, and Mon Mothma to persuade him to pull back from the brink. Palpatine somehow knows Sidious' name and orders the Jedi and Republic intelligence to hunt him down. In the bowels of the planet, trace elements lead Jedi Mace Windu, Shaak Ti and Republic intelligence to track down the same Darth Sidious that Count Dooku had been meeting with, the tower described by the Twi'lek pilot. The Jedi/Intelligence team are led through endless tunnels, but find a trail of evidence that leads to the Senate district. Here, the trail grows cold at the base of 500 Republica, the personal quarters of many of Coruscant's finest. At 500 Republica, a Republic Intelligence agent named Captain Dyne was separated from the Jedi, and was the first of the Republic to realize Darth Sidious' true identity – Supreme Chancellor Palpatine himself. He was astonished to learn that the Sith really do rule the galaxy. He died with the satisfaction of escaping the war. Before the search for the Sith Lord can proceed further, General Grievous leads an invasion of Coruscant that results in the capture of Palpatine.

As Coruscant is invaded by Separatist forces, Kenobi and Skywalker, fresh from an encounter with Dooku on the former industrial world of Tythe, use orbital hyperspace rings to depart for Coruscant. The novel ends "To Be Concluded".

=== Revenge of the Sith ===
The Supreme Chancellor effectively orders the Jedi on a wild-goose chase. But since certain Jedi trace the trail of his real identity back to Coruscant (see Yoda's ability to sense him on Coruscant, as well as Windu's investigations) he orchestrates his own kidnapping to end the chase and to further Anakin's eventual turn to the dark side of the Force.

After Kenobi, Anakin, and Palpatine crash land on Coruscant, Anakin and Kenobi have a brief conversation about who owes whom what. Obi-Wan mentions that "that business on Cato Nemoidia doesn't count."

=== Kamino Erasure ===
The novel reveals how all records of Kamino are erased from the Jedi Library in Star Wars: Episode II – Attack of the Clones.

== Writing ==
Labyrinth of Evil is the fourth Star Wars book written by James Luceno. It was released a few months before Star Wars: Episode III – Revenge of the Sith, the final installment of the Star Wars prequel trilogy. The novels served as a direct tie-in to the film, depicting events that occur directly before the events portrayed in Revenge of the Sith. Labyrinth of Evil is one of several novels that Luceno has written that connect directly with individual Star Wars films, such as Cloak of Deception (2001), which depicted events directly before Star Wars: Episode I – The Phantom Menace (1999), and Catalyst: A Rogue One Novel (2016), which served as a prelude to Rogue One (2016).

Luceno said when writing a Star Wars novel that connects with a film, he begins by "asking myself when and where the full story began", then imagining younger versions of the characters from the films. In the earliest outlines, the book was to build upon the opening crawl of Revenge of the Sith, particularly by depicting the off-screen kidnapping of Chancellor Palpatine. The starting point for Labyrinth of Evil was a line of dialogue from Revenge of the Sith in which Obi-Wan Kenobi briefly mentions to Anakin Skywalker "that business on Cato Neimoidia", an event from their past which is not further elaborated upon in the film. Luceno called that line "the springboard for exploring Obi-Wan and Anakin's friendship". Labyrinth of Evil was originally planned to include the death of Asajj Ventress, an antagonist from other Star Wars works whose story arc had remained unresolved by that point, but it was ultimately excluded from the final novel.

Luceno prepared a list of questions for Star Wars creator George Lucas to help inform the writing of Labyrinth of Evil. Those questions were provided to Matthew Stover, who visited Lucas at Skywalker Ranch for an interview to help him write the novelization of Revenge of the Sith, and Stover asked Luceno's questions during that conversation as well. Labyrinth of Evil was one of the first Star Wars works to feature General Grievous, who would serve as one of the primary antagonists in the Revenge of the Sith film.

== Release ==
Labyrinth of Evil was first released on January 25, 2005. Although not originally released as part of a trilogy, it was later packaged together with two other novels – Dark Lord: The Rise of Darth Vader (2005) and the 2005 novelization of Revenge of the Sith – and released as a single volume called The Dark Lord Trilogy, which was released in August 2008. All three novels feature Anakin Skywalker as a protagonist, and form what the official Star Wars website described as "a natural story arc that follows Anakin Skywalker's last days as hero of the galaxy and transformation into Darth Vader, Dark Lord of the Sith".

== Adaptations ==
=== Audio-drama ===
In Germany, the novel was adapted into an audio-drama (German radio play title: Labyrinth des Bösen, 2007, ISBN 978-3-8291-2087-6) recorded with all the German voice actors of the prequel trilogy. The production is a full-cast audio drama with music and sound effects. Oliver Döring directed the audio-drama and wrote its screenplay. The main cast was:

- Obi-Wan Kenobi: Philipp Moog
- Anakin Skywalker: Wanja Gerick
- Palpatine: Friedhelm Ptok
- Yoda: Tobias Meister
- Mace Windu: Helmut Gauß
- Grievous: Rainer Doering
- Padmé: Manja Doering
- Dooku: Klaus Sonnenschein
- Cody/Valiant/Oddball/clones: Martin Keßler
- C-3PO/TC-16: Wolfgang Ziffer
- Bail Organa: Thomas Vogt
- Dyne: Dietmar Wunder
- Nute Gunray: Joachim Siebenschuh
- Rune Haako: Karl-Heinz Oppel
- Sate Pestage: Matthias Haase
- Mon Mothma: Elisabeth Günther
- Fang Zar: Raimund Krone
- San Hill: Hans-Jürgen Wolf
- Jan Dodonna: Karlheinz Tafel
- Kit Fisto: Philipp Schepmann
- Shaak Ti: Katrin Fröhlich
- Fa'ale Leh: Franziska Pigulla
- Thal K'sar: Thomas Lang
- Travale: Detlef Bierstedt
- Stass Allie: Martina Treger
- Barkeeper: Helmut Krauss

=== Star Wars: Clone Wars ===
In 2005 Labyrinth of Evil was loosely adapted into the third season of Star Wars: Clone Wars, which also sought to portray the events immediately preceding Revenge of the Sith. The series followed the basic storyline featured in a draft of the novel, but departed from the details to portray a more exciting story for television. Among the changes were a more drawn-out sequence of Coruscant being attacked by droid starfighters, and a newly added story featuring Obi-Wan Kenobi and Anakin Skywalker on the planet Nelvaan, something only briefly mentioned in the final chapters of Labyrinth of Evil. In Clone Wars, the two investigate a possible base for Grievous on Nelvaan, but in the novel they pursue Count Dooku on Tythe, with Dooku only briefly pausing at Nelvaan when escaping to Coruscant. The Star Wars reference book The New Essential Chronology (2005) retconned this by stating that the Nelvaan events occurred before Tythe, with the final scene of Obi-Wan and Anakin getting the message from Mace Windu on the cruiser taking place after Tythe. Clone Wars also added two new Jedi characters to defend Chancellor Palpatine, named Roron Corobb and Foul Moudama. As a result, those two characters were also added to Labyrinth of Evil before its publication.

== Reception ==
Labyrinth of Evil appeared on the New York Times Best Seller list for three weeks in February 2005, achieving a peak rank of nine on the list. The novel was nominated for the 2005 Quill Award in the Science Fiction/Fantasy/Horror category.

Kayleena Pierce-Bohen of Screen Rant listed Labyrinth of Evil and the other novels in The Dark Lord Trilogy as #9 on a list of the 10 best Star Wars Legends novels, writing that they were the best collection of novels focused on the Darth Vader character. She wrote: "For those intrigued by the time period involving Anakin Skywalker transformation into the iconic Sith Lord, this collection is a must." In Library Journal, Jackie Cassada felt that "[s]pot-on characterizations of familiar series characters and a genuine feel for the space opera genre" made it a strong addition to the Star Wars book line-up. Anthony Giornalisa of The London Free Press wrote that the book builds anticipation for Revenge of the Sith nicely, and complimented Luceno's ability to use prose to so effectively execute a story in a franchise normally driven by special effects. He said the novel's portrayal of General Grievous in particular "underscores Luceno's ability to make strange beings and habitats seem lifelike", and that the book "achieved a standard that should satisfy even the most faithful fans".

Caleb Bailey of Comic Book Resources included a scene from Labyrinth of Evil in which Obi-Wan Kenobi becomes drunk on a list of the funniest moments from the Star Wars Expanded Universe. In the scene, Obi-Wan accidentally deflects a blaster shot into a canister of alien spores during a fight against droids, which causes him to become intoxicated and fight the droids using what Bailey refers to as "drunken Jedi kung-fu". He called the scene "Not one of Kenobi's proudest moments, but certainly one of his funniest." Entertainment Weekly writer Christian Blauvelt wrote that novels like Labyrinth of Evil helped establish Luceno as a writer with a particular expertise on the details and continuity of the Star Wars Expanded Universe. Not all critical reception of Labyrinth of Evil was positive. Jason Kehe of Wired said the novel was "not a particularly satisfying" backstory for the events on Cato Neimoidia that Kenobi referenced in Revenge of the Sith. A reviewer from Publishers Weekly thought that while Luceno "does a good job of maintaining excitement without revealing any secrets" about the film, the novel had no distinguishing features apart from its link to the film.
