= Wolfgang Ziffer =

German actor (1941–2022)

- Born: 26 October 1941; Wuppertal, Gau Düsseldorf, Germany
- Died: 12 December 2022 (aged 81)
- Occupation: Actor
- Spouse: Edeltraud Elsner
- Children: 1

Wolfgang Ziffer (26 October 1941 – 12 December 2022) was a German actor from Wuppertal.

Like a number of people in the voice acting industry, Ziffer was rarely seen live on film or television. Examples of his roles include Roger Rabbit in Who Framed Roger Rabbit, Calimero in Calimero, Digit in An American Tail (appropriately, Ziffer's surname means "digit"), Gulliver the Raven in Benjamin the Elephant, and Iago the Parrot in Aladdin. He frequently voices robot characters such as Number 5 in Short Circuit, V.I.N.CENT in The Black Hole, and C-3PO in the Star Wars prequel trilogy, Star Wars: The Clone Wars (2008 TV series), Star Wars Rebels and in the German radio plays Labyrinth des Bösen (based on James Lucenos novel Labyrinth of Evil) - 2007, ISBN 978-3-8291-2087-6 - and Dark Lord (based on James Lucenos novel Dark Lord: The Rise of Darth Vader). He is also the voice of Jonathan Livingston Seagull in the film bearing the same name.

He was the original German voice of J. Thaddeus Toad in The Adventures of Ichabod and Mr. Toad, though the 1993 dub has him voiced by Joachim Kaps.

In the TV series Riptide, Ziffer dubs over the character of Murray 'Boz' Bozinsky (played by Thom Bray). Additionally, he dubs over Corporal Peter Newkirk (played by Richard Dawson) in Hogan's Heroes.

Ziffer lived in Berlin, and was married to actress Edeltraud Elsner. He is the father of voice actress Julia Ziffer.
