= Philipp Moog =

German television actor, author and voice actor

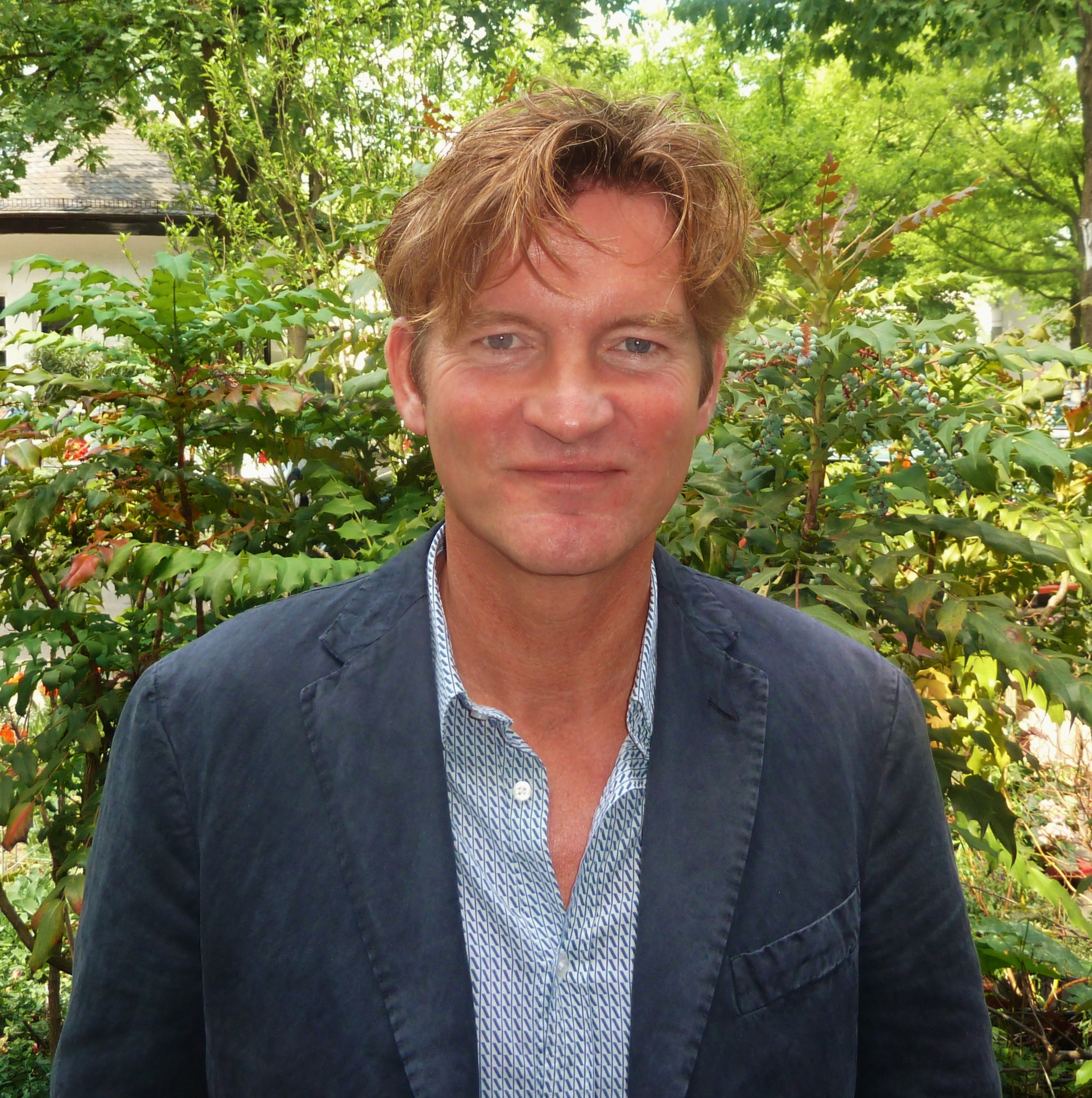
- Moog in Berlin
- Born: August 29, 1961 (age 64); Munich, Germany
- Awards: Adolf-Grimme-Preis mit Gold (2006) for "Marias letzte Reise"
- Website: http://www.agentur-contract.de/vita.php?actorsid=24&lang=EN

Philipp Moog (born August 29, 1961 in Munich, Germany) is a German television actor, Novelist, Teleplay-author, Audiobooknarrator and voice actor. He is the German voice of Neil Patrick Harris, Ewan McGregor and Owen Wilson.

== Career ==
In 1983, having been discovered by George Roy Hill, he starred in the movie The Little Drummer Girl along with Diane Keaton and Klaus Kinski. From 1984 to 1986 he studied at the Neighborhood Playhouse School of the Theatre and the Juilliard School in New York. In 1987 he was a member of Joanne Woodwards group Actor's und Director's Lab. Since the late 1980s he mainly appeared in German TV shows, for example Derrick, The Old Fox and Tatort. He had a recurring role in the ZDF series Sperling. He also wrote two screenplays for two episodes of Sperling.

Since the early 1980s is a very active voice actor. He voices Ewan McGregor in every movie since Shallow Grave, meaning he is the German voice of Obi-Wan Kenobi. He later reprised this role in Star Wars: Clone Wars (2003 TV series), Star Wars: The Clone Wars (2008 TV series), Star Wars Rebels, in the German radio plays Labyrinth des Bösen (based on James Lucenos novel Labyrinth of Evil) - 2007, ISBN 978-3-8291-2087-6 - and Dark Lord (based on James Lucenos novel Dark Lord: The Rise of Darth Vader) - 2008, ISBN 978-3-8291-2157-6, in Obi-Wan Kenobi (miniseries) and Star Wars: Tales. Moog is the recurring voice actor of Orlando Bloom, Owen Wilson and Guy Pearce, too. Since How I Met Your Mother he voices Neil Patrick Harris in his movies and TV appearances. He used his role as Barney Stinson to read the audiobooks of the Bro Code and the Playbook.

In 2008, he wrote his first novel Lebenslänglich (lifetime). And in 2017 Random House Audio published the Novelizations of Star Wars: Episode I – The Phantom Menace (German audiobook title: Star Wars: Episode I – Die dunkle Bedrohung, ISBN 978-3-8371-3645-6), Star Wars: Episode II – Attack of the Clones (German audiobook title: Star Wars: Episode II – Angriff der Klonkrieger, ISBN 978-3-8371-3647-0) and Star Wars: Episode III – Revenge of the Sith (German audiobook title: Star Wars: Episode III – Die Rache der Sith, ISBN 978-3-8371-3649-4) as Audiobooks read by Philipp Moog.

== Audiobooks ==
- 2008: Philipp Moog: Lebenslänglich. Read by the author, publisher: Patmos Verlagsgruppe, Düsseldorf, ISBN 978-3-491-91289-2
- 2012: A. D. Miller: Die eiskalte Jahreszeit der Liebe, publisher: Argon Verlag, ISBN 978-3-8398-1194-8
- 2012 (Audible): Jules Verne: In 80 Tagen um die Welt (Around the World in Eighty Days), publisher: Oetinger Media, ISBN 978-3-8373-0944-7
- 2015: Mario Giordano: Tante Poldi und die sizilianischen Löwen, publisher: Lübbe Audio, ISBN 978-3-7857-5077-3
- 2016: Mario Giordano: Tante Poldi und die Früchte des Herrn, publisher: Lübbe Audio, ISBN 978-3-404-17523-9
- 2017: Terry Brooks: Star Wars: Episode I – Die dunkle Bedrohung (Novelization), Random House Audio, ISBN 978-3-8371-3645-6
- 2017: R. A. Salvatore: Star Wars: Episode II – Angriff der Klonkrieger (Novelization), publisher: Random House Audio, ISBN 978-3-8371-3647-0
- 2017: Matthew Stover: Star Wars: Episode III – Die Rache der Sith (Novelization), publisher: Random House Audio, ISBN 978-3-8371-3649-4
- 2021: Philipp Moog: Anderwelt. Read by the author, publisher: Karl Rauch Verlag/Audible

== Filmography (selection) ==
- 1989: Autumn Milk (Herbstmilch)
- 1991: Go Trabi Go
- 1997: Die Story von Monty Spinnerratz
- 2000: Eine Hand schmiert die andere
- 2005: Marias letzte Reise (Maria's Last Journey)

== Works ==
- 2008: Lebenslänglich. Novel, publisher: DuMont Verlag, ISBN 978-3-8321-8075-1
- 2021: Anderwelt. Novel, publisher: Karl Rauch Verlag, ISBN 978-3-7920-0274-2
