= Star Wars: Episode III – Revenge of the Sith (disambiguation) =

Star Wars: Episode III – Revenge of the Sith is a 2005 film in the Star Wars saga. It may also refer to:

- Star Wars: Episode III – Revenge of the Sith (video game), a video game adaptation of the film
- Star Wars: Episode III – Revenge of the Sith (soundtrack), the soundtrack of the film
- Star Wars: Episode III – Revenge of the Sith (novel), the novelization of the film

== See also ==
- Revenge of the Jedi, the working title for the third original Star Wars film Return of the Jedi
- Robot Chicken: Star Wars Episode III, a 2010 episode special of the comedy television series Robot Chicken
