= Nancherrow =

- Based on: Nancherrow by Rosamunde Pilcher
- Screenplay by: John Goldsmith
- Directed by: Simon Langton
- Starring: Joanna Lumley; Tristan Gemmill; Robert Hardy; Lynda Baron; Susan Hampshire; Patrick Ryecart; Philipp Moog
- Theme music composer: Alan Parker
- Country of origin: Great Britain
- Original language: English
- No. of episodes: 2

Production
- Producer: David Cunliffe
- Running time: 180 minutes

Original release
- Network: ITV
- Release: 4 April – 5 April 1999

Nancherrow is a British miniseries that aired on ITV television from 4 to 5 April 1999. The story is set in the country mansion called Nancherrow on the Cornish coast and is a sequel to the previous year's Coming Home.

== Reception ==
In a review for The Mirror, Charlie Catchpole wrote that "It required patience, stamina, a stiff drink and a box of man- sized Kleenex to get through to the end of Nancherrow".

== Synopsis ==
After the Colonel dies it is his daughter, Loveday, who inherits the house and all of its problems, including dry rot. Bewitched by the magic of Nancherrow, Loveday fights to keep the estate going so that, in time, her young son Nat may inherit same, while dealing with the reappearance of her one true love Gus and her failing marriage to Walter.

Judith is finding life as the wife of a busy doctor difficult, especially after suffering multiple miscarriages. It is a time of change and expectation for everyone at Nancherrow.

== Cast ==
- Joanna Lumley as Diana Carey-Lewis
- Katie Ryder Richardson as Loveday Carey-Lewis
- Lara-Joy Körner as Judith Dunbar
- George Asprey as Jeremy Wells
- Susan Hampshire as Miss Catto
- Patrick Ryecart as Tommy Mortimer
- Philipp Moog as Gus Cullendar
- Tristan Gemmill as Walter
- Robert Hardy as Viscount Berryann
- Lynda Baron as Dashka
- Jake Gomme as Younger Nat
- Josh Wynter as Older Nat
- Emily Hamilton as Jess
- Simon Dutton as Ronny Cox
- Lucy Robinson as Laura Cox
- Paul Curran as Simon Travis
- Samantha Beckinsale as Nesta Carew
- Robert Lang as Jerry Pinch
- Christian Kohlund as Nikko Bernhoffer
- Senta Berger as Alex Gower
- Donald Sinden as Robin Jarvis
- Colin Prockter as The Mayor
- Nicola Breeze as Norma
- Eric Carte as The Headmaster
- Barnaby Wynter as Will Travis
- Michael Cochrane as Sir George Rawlings
- Patrick Macnee as Lord Peter Awliscombe
- Lucy Fleming as The Specialist
- Henry Moxon as Stockbridge
- Rosanna Wollenberg as Susan
- India Martin as Jenny
- Derek Bentham as The Auctioneer
- Kenneth Harkness as Funeral Bugler

== DVD release ==
Nancherrow is available on DVD in the UK.
