= Star Wars: Clone Wars =

American animated television series

- Volume One art, featuring (counterclockwise from middle): heroes Anakin Skywalker, Yoda, Obi-Wan Kenobi, and Mace Windu; and villains Asajj Ventress, Durge, and Count Dooku
- Genre: Military science fiction; Action; Adventure
- Created by: Genndy Tartakovsky
- Based on: Star Wars by George Lucas
- Developed by: Genndy Tartakovsky
- Story by: Bryan Andrews; Darrick Bachman; Paul Rudish; Genndy Tartakovsky
- Directed by: Genndy Tartakovsky
- Voices of: Mat Lucas; James Arnold Taylor; Tom Kane; Grey DeLisle; Anthony Daniels; Corey Burton; André Sogliuzzo; Richard McGonagle; Nick Jameson
- Theme music composer: John Williams
- Composers: James L. Venable; Paul Dinletir
- Country of origin: United States
- Original language: English
- No. of seasons: 3
- No. of episodes: 25

Production
- Executive producer: Brian A. Miller
- Producers: Genndy Tartakovsky; Shareena Carlson (Season 3)
- Running time: Season 1–2: 3–5 minutes; Season 3: 12–15 minutes
- Production companies: Lucasfilm; Cartoon Network Studios

Original release
- Network: Cartoon Network
- Release: November 7, 2003 – March 25, 2005

Related
- Star Wars: The Clone Wars; Star Wars Forces of Destiny

Star Wars: Clone Wars is an American animated science fiction television series developed and directed by Genndy Tartakovsky and produced by Lucasfilm and Cartoon Network Studios for Cartoon Network. Set in the Star Wars universe, specifically between the Star Wars prequel trilogy films Attack of the Clones and Revenge of the Sith, it is amongst the first of many works to explore the Clone Wars. The show follows the actions of various prequel trilogy characters, notably Jedi and clone troopers, in their war against the droid armies of the Confederacy of Independent Systems and the Sith.

The series aired on Cartoon Network for three seasons totaling 25 episodes from November 7, 2003, to March 25, 2005, and was the first Star Wars television series since Ewoks (1985–1986). The first two seasons of Clone Wars, released on DVD as Volume One were produced in episodes ranging from two to three minutes, while the third season consists of five 12-minute episodes and was released on DVD as Volume Two. The two volumes were released on DVD by 20th Century Fox Home Entertainment. Since its release, the series has received critical acclaim and won multiple awards, including the Primetime Emmy Award for Outstanding Animated Program for both volumes. Its success led to it being spun off as the CGI series The Clone Wars in 2008. As of 2026 the show is currently available to be streamed on Disney+.

== Plot ==
The series begins shortly after Attack of the Clones, as the failing Galactic Republic and the Jedi are under siege from the Separatist Confederacy of Independent Systems and the Sith. As the war rages on, more planets start slipping from Republic control.

=== Synopsis ===
The main storyline of Volume One features the Jedi Knight Obi-Wan Kenobi leading an assault on the planet Muunilinst. This is the home of the Intergalactic Banking Clan, benefactors of the Separatists wishing to break away from the Republic. The Banking Clan has hired a bounty hunter named Durge to command their droid armies on the battlefield. Obi-Wan's apprentice, Anakin Skywalker, is personally appointed to lead the space forces in the battle by Supreme Chancellor Palpatine. Meanwhile, Separatist leader Count Dooku takes the Force-sensitive Asajj Ventress as his Sith apprentice and sends her to kill Anakin. On Yavin 4, Anakin manages to defeat Ventress in a lightsaber duel by drawing on his anger.

Surrounding this storyline are various battles focusing on other Jedi and their wartime exploits. Master Mace Windu faces a droid army unarmed on Dantooine, Master Yoda travels to the ice world Ilum to save Luminara Unduli and Barriss Offee, the amphibious Kit Fisto leads an aquatic regiment of clone troopers on the waterworld Mon Cala, and a group of stranded Jedi encounter the dreaded Jedi hunter General Grievous on Hypori.

Volume Two picks up right where Volume One ended, with Obi-Wan sending his team of ARC troopers to Hypori to rescue the Jedi from Grievous. The Republic is now desperate and, after much consideration, the Jedi Council decides to promote Anakin to the rank of Jedi Knight. The series then jumps ahead to nearly the end of the war, when Anakin has become a much more powerful Jedi.

Anakin and Obi-Wan are assigned to search for Grievous on the planet Nelvaan, but instead end up liberating a group of Nelvaanians who had been enslaved and mutated by the Separatist Techno Union. While rescuing the Nelvaan warriors, Anakin sees a cryptic vision of his eventual transformation into Darth Vader. Meanwhile, Grievous leads an assault on Coruscant and, despite the best efforts of Yoda, Mace Windu, Shaak Ti, and others, he kidnaps Palpatine. Anakin and Obi-Wan then set out to rescue the Chancellor over Coruscant mere minutes before, and leading directly into, the beginning of Revenge of the Sith.

=== Continuity ===
Several attempts were made to maintain continuity within the overall saga, most notably bridging Attack of the Clones to Revenge of the Sith. Anakin appears with his new lightsaber (as in Episode III) after his previous one was destroyed in the previous film. In "Chapter 21", C-3PO makes his first appearance in gold plating and Anakin is knighted. He sends his Padawan braid to Padmé, who stores it with the necklace he gave her in The Phantom Menace. (Note: In the novelization of Revenge of the Sith, it is recounted that Anakin gave the braid to Padmé in person. In both the book and animation, she then assigns R2-D2 to him.) In "Chapter 22", Anakin appears with the facial scar he has in Revenge of the Sith, and it is implied that Anakin and Padmé may have conceived the Skywalker twins on Naboo.

The series is notable for introducing one of Revenge of the Sith's villains, General Grievous (in "Chapter 20"), although some of his personality traits had yet to be finalized. According to Genndy Tartakovsky, George Lucas initially pitched Grievous to him and his crew as "this ruthless, totally capable Jedi killer," but later developed him into "one of those old B-serial villains who does something bad ... twirls his mustache and then he runs off." The character was given a severe cough in Revenge of the Sith, intended to emphasize his organic nature and the flaws of his cyborg prosthetics. His depiction in Clone Wars lacked a cough until the concluding episode, when Mace Windu Force-crushes the chestplate housing Grievous's internal organs. This was intended to create continuity with the film and was mentioned in its novelization. However, the CGI The Clone Wars series (2008–2014, 2020) depicts Grievous as already being in this weakened state.

Volume Two shares aspects of its storyline with the novel Labyrinth of Evil, which was created at the same time. Both the cartoon and book climax with the Jedi chasing Grievous on Coruscant to save Palpatine. The book features a different final duel between Windu and Grievous, but Shaak Ti acts as Palpatine's primary guardian in both titles. In the series, Anakin and Obi-Wan investigate a possible base for Grievous on Nelvaan before being called back to Coruscant. The novel depicts the Jedi duo pursuing Count Dooku on Tythe. While fleeing to Coruscant, Dooku stops at Nelvaan to leave a false trail. (Note: The planet Dooku visits was changed to 'Koobi' in the 2007 audiobook, explained by the Star Wars Databank to be Nelvaan's planetary system.) While the final season of The Clone Wars references Shaak Ti being sent to guard Palpatine, it depicts Anakin and Obi-Wan in yet a different location just before Revenge of the Sith. (Note: Den of Geek's Ryan Britt regards the final arc of The Clone Wars as not entirely negating the final arc of the earlier series.)

Clone Wars served as a pilot for the CGI The Clone Wars. (Note: Anakin already has his facial scar and is a knight in the CGI The Clone Wars film and series, in which he takes an apprentice.) The character designer for the latter series attempted to translate aspects of the character designs from the 2D series to 3D. It was originally reported that the 2008 series would not supersede the continuity of the 2003 series, but following Disney's acquisition of Lucasfilm, in 2014, it was announced that the CGI The Clone Wars would officially be considered canon, while the 2003 series and most other spin-off works would not.

== Production ==
Genndy Tartakovsky claimed that Lucasfilm conceived of the series as a way to sell more action figures because the prequel trilogy figures were underselling. It was produced and directed by Tartakovsky, the creator of Dexter's Laboratory and Samurai Jack, and employs a similar animation style to the latter. According to Tartakovsky, the series was developed in two weeks, created by a small crew, and "it was stressful because I had to translate this world I've loved since I was a kid into something completely different." Originally, Lucas wanted each episode to be one minute long, which Tartakovsky resisted because it was equivalent to making a "commercial." Eventually, the team was able to convince Lucas to give 3–5 minutes duration after he learned that Tartakovsky was involved as both he and his son were fans of Samurai Jack.

Tartakovsky stated that he deliberately animated C-3PO with moveable expressive eyes to pay homage to his animated appearances in the Star Wars Holiday Special and Droids. Additionally, the planet Nelvaan's name was a nod to Nelvana, the production company that produced all previous Star Wars animated series. In "Chapter 21", a Dulok appears, which is a species that was introduced in Ewoks. According to art director Paul Rudish, the Banking Clan planet of Muunilinst was designed to look like a U.S. dollar bill.

Although the show was largely animated in digital 2D, the motion of the spaceships was cel-shaded 3D animation.

== Voice cast ==
- Mat Lucas as Anakin Skywalker
  - Frankie Ryan Manriquez as young Anakin Skywalker
- James Arnold Taylor as Obi-Wan Kenobi and Agen Kolar; For his voice-portrayal as the former, Taylor used an impression, similar to that of Ewan McGregor's.
- Tom Kane as Yoda
- Terrence "T.C." Carson as Mace Windu, Saesee Tiin, and General Oro Dassyne
- Anthony Daniels as C-3PO
- Corey Burton as Count Dooku and San Hill
- Grey DeLisle as Asajj Ventress, Padmé Amidala, Shaak Ti, and Stass Allie
- Nick Jameson as Palpatine / Darth Sidious
- André Sogliuzzo as Commander Cody, Captain Typho, Captain Fordo, and all clone troopers
- Richard McGonagle as General Grievous (Note: Grievous was played by John DiMaggio in the season 2 finale, while McGonagle took over the role for season 3.) and Kit Fisto
- Fred Tatasciore as Qui-Gon Jinn and Oppo Rancisis
- Daran Norris as Ki-Adi-Mundi, Durge, Master Barrek, Even Piell, and Tarr Seirr
- John DiMaggio as General Grievous and Sha'a Gi
- Cree Summer as Luminara Unduli
- Tatyana Yassukovich as Barriss Offee
- Kevin Michael Richardson as K'Kruhk

== Broadcast ==
The series originally ran on Cartoon Network. In addition to being shown on television, the episodes were simultaneously released online on the Star Wars and Cartoon Network websites. It was heavily advertised by the channel and was originally shown immediately before their popular Friday-night programming block, 'Fridays'.

== Episodes ==
Season	Episodes	Originally released	
Season	Episodes	First released	Last released
1	10	November 7, 2003	November 20, 2003
2	10	March 26, 2004	April 8, 2004
3	5	March 22, 2005	March 26, 2005

=== Season 1 (2003) ===
The first season consisted of 10 episodes, lasting three minutes each. Along with the second season, it was released on DVD as Volume One.

No. overall	No. in season	Title	Original release date	Prod. code
1	1	"Chapter 1"	November 7, 2003	101
Following the battle of Geonosis from Attack of the Clones, the Clone Wars rage across the galaxy. Obi-Wan Kenobi is given the task of leading the assault on Muunilinst, currently under occupation from the Banking Clan, a Separatist-affiliated corporation. Meanwhile Anakin Skywalker gets command over the space forces as per Palpatine's request. Anakin bids farewell to his secret wife, Senator Padmé Amidala.
2	2	"Chapter 2"	November 10, 2003	102
Obi-Wan's ARC troopers are shot down over the capital of Muunilinst as the assault on the Intergalactic Banking Clan's planet begins.
3	3	"Chapter 3"	November 11, 2003	103
Pinned down by droid enemy fire, the ARC troopers must make use of their specialist training to reach their target.
4	4	"Chapter 4"	November 12, 2003	104
With the battle of Muunilinst raging in space as well as on land, Banking Clan leader San Hill orders Durge and his IG-lancer droids to defend the city from Republic forces.
5	5	"Chapter 5"	November 13, 2003	105
On Mon Calamari, Kit Fisto and his Scuba Troopers defends the Calamari against Manta Droid sub fighters army of the Quarren Isolation league, a Separatist group. Mon Calamari Knights riding giant Keelkanas provide the Republic forces with back up.
6	6	"Chapter 6"	November 14, 2003	106
Count Dooku arrives on Rattatak to witness the gladiator fights at the "Cauldron" in search for an assassin. Asajj Ventress beats every opponent in the arena and claims to be a Sith.
7	7	"Chapter 7"	November 17, 2003	107
Dooku submits Ventress to a test with a lightsaber before sending her on her way to find and eliminate Anakin.
8	8	"Chapter 8"	November 18, 2003	108
General Kenobi and his troopers mount up on speeder bikes to take on Durge and the droid forces from the Intergalactic Banking Clan.
9	9	"Chapter 9"	November 19, 2003	109
General Kenobi and the ARC Troopers capture the Banking Clan's headquarters but Durge remains in pursuit, displaying almost unstoppable regenerative powers.
10	10	"Chapter 10"	November 20, 2003	110
Anakin proves himself to be the best star fighter in the galaxy battling Geonosian fighters above Muunilinst.

=== Season 2 (2004) ===
The second season consisted of 10 episodes, lasting three minutes each. Along with the first season, it was released on DVD as Volume One.

No. overall	No. in season	Title	Original release date	Prod. code
11	1	"Chapter 11"	March 26, 2004	201
Anakin chases a mysterious rogue pilot (Ventress) piloting a Geonosian fanblade starfighter and against Obi-Wan's orders, pursues her into hyperspace.
12	2	"Chapter 12"	March 29, 2004	202
Young Paxi Sylo looks on as General Mace Windu battles Separatist droids backed up by enormous seismic tanks on Dantooine.
13	3	"Chapter 13"	March 30, 2004	203
Having lost his lightsaber, Master Windu must take on a battalion of Super Battle Droids hand to hand.
14	4	"Chapter 14"	March 31, 2004	204
The sacred Jedi Temple on Ilum is attacked by Chameleon droids just as Luminara Unduli's padawan, Barriss Offee is completing her training.
15	5	"Chapter 15"	April 1, 2004	205
Master Yoda, traveling aboard Senator Amidala's ship, persuades Captain Typho to take a detour to Ilum in order to mount a rescue operation.
16	6	"Chapter 16"	April 2, 2004	206
Padmé, worrying about Master Yoda's whereabouts, is attacked by Chameleon Droids. Luckily she has C-3PO to use as a decoy.
17	7	"Chapter 17"	April 5, 2004	207
Anakin has followed Ventress to Yavin 4. Although a clone squadron has been sent after them by Obi-Wan in a Republic carrier, they prove to be no match for the Sith hopeful.
18	8	"Chapter 18"	April 6, 2004	208
Ventress leads Anakin through the jungles of Yavin 4 toward the ancient Massassi temples once inhabited by Exar Kun.
19	9	"Chapter 19"	April 7, 2004	209
Driven to the edge by Ventress, Anakin almost gives in to the Dark Side in a final bid to defeat her.
20	10	"Chapter 20"	April 8, 2004	210
The Republic has won the battle of Muunilinst, but news arrives of a new droid general hunting down Jedi on the planet Hypori. There, a group of Jedi consisting of Ki-Adi Mundi, Shaak Ti, Aayla Secura, K'Kruhk, Tarr Seirr, Daakman Barrek and Sha'a Gi are driven into a corner by the formidable General Grievous.

=== Season 3 (2005) ===
The third and final season consisted of five episodes, lasting 12 minutes each. These episodes were released on DVD as Volume Two.

No. overall	No. in season	Title	Original release date	Prod. code
21	1	"Chapter 21"	March 21, 2005	301
Captain Fordo and his ARC troopers rescue Ki-Adi-Mundi, Aayla Secura and Shaak Ti from General Grievous. The Jedi council grants Anakin the title of Jedi Knight, after which Senator Amidala allows him the use of R2-D2 as co-pilot for his Jedi Interceptor starship.
22	2	"Chapter 22"	March 22, 2005	302
Closer to the end of the war, Anakin has become battle-scarred and leads the third army of the Republic alongside Obi-Wan. They blow up a shield generator and capture a fortress. Meanwhile, Separatist forces move in on Outer Rim planets such as Kashyyyk, Orto and Bal'demnic. Anakin visits Padmé on Naboo, but as Darth Sidious launches his final operation, he and Obi-Wan are sent to Nelvaan, where Anakin disrupts a young native's rite of passage by defeating a giant Horax.
23	3	"Chapter 23"	March 23, 2005	303
Coruscant is attacked by Separatist forces. Windu takes to the air while Yoda rides his Kybuck to defend the city. Meanwhile, Saesee Tinn leads his troops into battle just above the planet's atmosphere. On Nelvaan, Obi-Wan volunteers Anakin to take the trial of fire, in which Anakin is labelled by the Nelvaanians as "Holt Kazed" ("Ghost Hand").
24	4	"Chapter 24"	March 24, 2005	304
Jedi Shaak Ti, Roron Corobb and Foul Moudama fight to keep Supreme Chancellor Palpatine out of General Grievous's mechanical claws. Anakin finds a hidden laboratory where the Techno Union is conducting mutation experiments on Nelvaan warriors.
25	5	"Chapter 25"	March 25, 2005	305
Shaak Ti takes a desperate stand against Grievous's Magnaguards. Anakin, surrounded by mutated Nelvaan Warriors, must destroy the geothermal crystal powering the siphon generator. Master Windu hurries to face General Grievous, who abducts Palpatine. When Anakin and Obi-Wan learn of this, they set out on a dangerous rescue mission, leading to the opening of Revenge of the Sith.

== Reception ==
=== Critical response ===
As of 2019, the review aggregator website Rotten Tomatoes lists four out of five critics as giving season 1 a positive review. In 2009, Clone Wars was ranked 21 on IGN's Top 100 Animated Series list.

Various articles have been written about the series since its 2021 release on Disney+. ComicBook.com writes that it "is worth a watch for any fan of magnificent animation". SyFy Wire's Phil Pirrello rated the series as the best Star Wars television production ever produced, writing that Genndy Tartakovsky "gave Star Wars its most dynamic visuals ever as he tackled all the Clone Wars action and conflict Lucas left out of his big-screen prequels." Pirrello continues: "[W]hat Clone Wars lacks in intricate storytelling it more than makes up for with stunning animation and stirring action scenes. The mini-episodes are bare bones by design, as Tartakovsky employs a pure visual storytelling execution ... The franchise has only taken such a bold stylistic risk this one time." Collider's Liam Gaughan calls the series "ahead of its time" and says it "better utilized the environments, planets, and tech designs [than] the prequels" as well as "side characters better suited for a brief adventure", concluding that it is "a striking piece of standalone animation that doesn't require comprehensive knowledge of the universe" and "a groundbreaking work of art". Elijah Beahm of The Escapist states that the series "took effectively everything people loved and hated about the prequel films – and made it work."

In a list of "Best Animated Star Wars Moments", /Film credits the series with marking "the arrival of a new era for animated storytelling that seriously expanded the canon of the galaxy far, far away", specifically praising the dialogue-free scenes of Mace Windu fighting battle droids without a lightsaber (calling it "a dream seeing the legend in action") and Anakin's premonitory hallucination of Vader's helmet on a cave wall (drawing a parallel to Luke's vision on Dagobah in The Empire Strikes Back).

=== Awards and nominations ===
Award	Type	Season(s)	Year
Saturn Award for "Best Television Presentation" in the Academy of Science Fiction, Fantasy & Horror Films, USA	Nominated	1 and 2	2004
Emmy Award for "Outstanding Animated Program (for Programming One Hour or More)"	Won	1 and 2	2004
Emmy Award for "Outstanding Animated Program (for Programming One Hour or More)"	Won	3	2005
Emmy Award to background key designer Justin Thompson for "Outstanding Individual in Animation"	Won	3	2005
Annie Award for "Best Animated Television Production"	Won	3	2006

== Home media ==
Both volumes were released on DVD by 20th Century Fox Home Entertainment, making it one of the few Cartoon Network original shows not to have their home releases released through Warner Home Video. Both volumes were released on Disney+ on April 2, 2021.

Title	Release date		Chapters
Title	Region 1	Region 2	Chapters
Star Wars: Clone Wars – Volume One	March 22, 2005	May 9, 2005	1–20
This release contains all 20 of the show's 3-minute episodes, edited together into one continuous feature with English subtitles and an optional commentary track. Extras include art galleries, behind-the-scenes information, and the featurette "Bridging the Saga: From Clone Wars to Revenge of the Sith", a Revenge of the Sith teaser trailer, as well as interviews with George Lucas, Genndy Tartakovsky, and the production crew. The disc also features a glimpse of Star Wars: Clone Wars – Volume Two, an Episode III game trailer, and a playable level of the Xbox game Star Wars: Republic Commando.
Star Wars: Clone Wars – Volume Two	December 6, 2005	December 5, 2005	21–25
This release contains all five of the show's 12-minute episodes, edited together into one continuous feature with English subtitles and an optional commentary track. Extras include a Revenge of the Sith trailer, art galleries, trailers for the Star Wars games Battlefront II and Empire at War, an Xbox demo with two levels from Battlefront II, and the Lego short film Revenge of the Brick. Also included is the featurette "Connecting the Dots", which highlights the creative process that Tartakovsky and his team used to link Clone Wars to Revenge of the Sith.

== Merchandising ==
A series of Hasbro action figures was released between 2003 and 2005, including four Walmart-exclusive "Commemorative DVD Collection" 3-packs (which did not include a DVD). Between 2004 and 2007, Dark Horse Comics published a ten-volume comic series titled Clone Wars – Adventures, which utilized the style of the 2D animated series and depicts original stories set during the era. In 2021, more toys were released to promote the series, as part of Star Wars: The Vintage Collection.

== Legacy ==
Elements of the series, including the regenerative villain Durge, (Note: The character was designed by Skywalker Ranch's art department and first appeared in Dark Horse Comics' Star Wars: Republic series.) are mentioned in the 2005 novelization of Revenge of the Sith. According to the (now-defunct) Star Wars Databank, Durge has a vendetta against Mandalorians and extends this to the clones of Jango Fett. Durge was considered for inclusion in The Clone Wars, but was dropped in favor of the new bounty-hunter character Cad Bane. Durge also appears in a 2021 issue of the canon Marvel comic book series Doctor Aphra, as part of the War of the Bounty Hunters crossover event, set between The Empire Strikes Back and Return of the Jedi. The 2023 video game Jedi: Survivor features Rayvis, a member of Durge's species, the Gen'Dai.

Nelvaan has been mentioned in canon reference books. Versions of the medieval-style Jedi knighting ceremony have appeared in canon works such as Star Wars Rebels and Jedi: Fallen Order. A 2022 Comic Book Resources (CBR) article opines that certain elements of the series which do not conflict with more recent works "are good enough to deserve canon status", such as the duel between Anakin and Ventress, the introduction of Grievous, and the knighting ceremony. The 2022 Clone Wars novel Brotherhood establishes a new origin for Ventress, which CBR interprets as definitively demoting the series to non-canon status, calling the implication "a shame". The book's author, Mike Chen, explains that he viewed Ventress and Skywalker's duel from Clone Wars as "kind of canon", like animated Republic propaganda of Anakin's encounters with Dooku's agents (as referenced in the novel). A 2022 issue of Obi-Wan references Mace Windu's battle on Dantooine.

== Tie-in media ==
Clone Wars: Adventures ran from 2004 to 2007 and features art based on the series (2003–2005). The volumes are numbered 1–10 and not individually titled.
