= Darth Plagueis =

Fictional character in the Star Wars franchise

- Star Wars character
- Darth Plagueis as he appears in Star Wars Legends material
- First appearance: Film and TV; The Acolyte (2024) (Note: Plagueis is first mentioned in Revenge of the Sith (2005) by Emperor Palpatine.); Literature: Star Wars: Darth Plagueis (2012)
- Created by: George Lucas

In-universe information
- Full name: Hego Damask II (Legends)
- Nickname: Darth Plagueis the Wise
- Species: Muun
- Gender: Male
- Title: Darth Plagueis
- Occupation: Dark Lord of the Sith; Magister of Damask Holdings (Legends)
- Affiliation: Sith Order (Canon); Sith Order, InterGalactic Banking Clan and Damask Holdings (Legends)
- Family: Hego Damask I (grandfather; Legends); Caar Damask (father; Legends)
- Master: Darth Tenebrous
- Apprentices: "Qimir"/The Stranger; Darth Sidious
- Homeworld: Mygeeto (Legends)

Darth Plagueis (/ˈpleɪɡɪs/ PLAYG-iss), also referred to as Darth Plagueis the Wise, is a fictional character in the Star Wars franchise created by George Lucas. A Sith Lord perceived to have the ability to cheat death and create life, Plagueis is the enigmatic mentor of Palpatine (known by his Sith name Darth Sidious), who eventually betrays Plagueis by murdering him in his sleep, taking his place as Sith Master in accordance with the Sith's Rule of Two. The character was first mentioned on-screen in the 2005 film Star Wars: Episode III – Revenge of the Sith, in which Palpatine frames his life and death as a "legend" to pique Anakin Skywalker's curiosity about the dark side of the Force. Plagueis has a more prominent presence in the Star Wars Expanded Universe.

== Development ==
The character of Darth Plagueis was conceived by George Lucas as early as the first draft of the screenplay for Star Wars: Episode III – Revenge of the Sith (2005), or possibly earlier. The first draft dates from April 2003. Despite how later Star Wars works would portray Plagueis as having power over life and death as described by Palpatine in the film, Lucas intended Palpatine's tale about Plagueis' abilities to be a lie. He came up with Plagueis' species for James Luceno to use when writing the character's eponymous 2012 novel after Luceno asked him if the character could be an alien, sending Luceno some artist renderings of Plagueis, including that of a Muun.

For the Disney+ miniseries The Acolyte (2024), showrunner Leslye Headland decided early on to feature Darth Plagueis in the first season finale due to her interest in seeing the character debut in live-action media. The character makes a cameo appearance early in the season finale; an early version had him showing up at the end instead of Yoda, but Headland discarded that due to not wanting to ruin Osha's triumph. Headland also felt that Plagueis' appearance adds to the inevitable tragedy of Osha and "The Stranger" being doomed to fail in their plans due to the Sith's Rule of Two. To create the character's appearance, Headland and her crew rendered Plagueis entirely through CGI without any use of motion capture.

== Appearances ==
=== Revenge of the Sith ===
Darth Plagueis is first mentioned in the 2005 prequel film Revenge of the Sith. While attending the opera, Palpatine, who is secretly the Sith Lord Darth Sidious, tells Anakin Skywalker about "the tragedy of Darth Plagueis the Wise". Palpatine explains that Plagueis was so powerful and wise, he had mastered the dark side of the Force to such an extent that he could cheat death (mostly saving people he cared about from death) and create life; unnatural abilities which are unknown to the Jedi. Ironically, Plagueis was unable to prevent his own death at the hands of his apprentice (Palpatine implies that the apprentice is himself), who killed him in his sleep. Later in the film, Palpatine, as Sidious, tempts Anakin to the dark side by promising to use its power to prevent Anakin's pregnant wife Padmé Amidala from dying, as Anakin had foreseen.

=== The Rise of Skywalker novelization ===
Darth Plagueis is mentioned in Rae Carson's novelization of the 2019 film The Rise of Skywalker. In the book, it is revealed that Palpatine had discovered Plagueis' "secret to immortality", using this knowledge to resurrect himself after his death in Return of the Jedi. The novel further explains that Plagueis had attempted to create a powerful connection with Palpatine known as a 'Force dyad', a concept mentioned in the film as occurring naturally between Rey and Ben Solo. Plagueis' inability to use his powers to save himself from death is also detailed in the novelization; Plagueis "had not acted fast enough in his own moment of death" to prevent Palpatine from killing him.

=== The Acolyte ===
Darth Plagueis made his first live-action appearance in the series The Acolyte. During the final episode of the season, he made a small cameo appearance from a distance as he watches his apprentice, "Qimir"/The Stranger and former Jedi, Osha, leave the planet to find latter's twin sister, Mae, and her former master, Sol. It is revealed that the twins were created by their mother using the Force. Plagueis appears as a frail, withered being with dimly glowing eyes, apparently of the same species as his Legends counterpart.

=== Legends ===
In April 2014, Lucasfilm rebranded most of the licensed Star Wars Expanded Universe material produced since the originating 1977 film Star Wars as Star Wars Legends and declared it non-canon to the franchise. Star Wars Legends literature elaborates on Plagueis' life, apprenticeship under the Bith Sith Lord Darth Tenebrous, and mentorship of Palpatine, up until his death at the latter's hands.

==== Databooks ====
According to the 2005 book Star Wars: The Ultimate Visual Guide, Plagueis had also discovered the ability to retain one's identity in the Force while becoming one with it, but this way of surviving death did not appeal to him, as he was mainly concerned with the material world.

The New Essential Chronology, published the same year, established Plagueis had found a way to prevent death with the Force, after which he desired to reach beyond and create life from nothing by directly manipulating midi-chlorians. Plagueis had possibly initiated his experiments before being murdered by his apprentice Sidious (which would have happened at some point between 52 and 46 years before the events of A New Hope), and there was evidence to believe Anakin Skywalker's virginal birth was the result. Sidious failed to replicate Plagueis' way to prevent death and was forced to rely on clone bodies to hold his spirit, as shown in Dark Empire comic book series.

The book Vader: The Ultimate Guide, centered around the character of Darth Vader, confirmed Plagueis had achieved the abilities to prevent death and generate life by manipulating midi-chlorians. Through this method, Plagueis intended to create a living embodiment of the Force. However, Plagueis's apprentice Sidious grew concerned the resulting being would be his replacement, so he murdered Plagueis in his sleep. Sidious himself had already started training his own apprentice, Darth Maul, without his own master' knowledge. It was still believed Plagueis' experiment had produced Anakin Skywalker.

The 2007 Essential Guide to the Force officialized Plagueis' race as a Muun and gave him a canonical image. It also revealed he had taught Sidious over several decades, while Sidious in turn later trained his own apprentice, Darth Maul, although he might have trained others before Maul. The book establishes that after the events of Return of the Jedi, New Republic historians suspected Sidious had destroyed all available information about Plagueis. The only source about him was a manuscript by a Sith sympathizer named Ingo Wavlud.

==== Dark Lord: The Rise of Darth Vader ====
The character is mentioned at the background of Dark Lord: The Rise of Darth Vader, a Legends novel by James Luceno published on January 1, 2006. It revealed Sidious' training under his tutelage, which involved being forced to face his fears, having his pleasures denied, and the things he loved taken from him. Plagueis also espoused that envy and hatred, although necessary to master the Dark Side, were only means to abandon morality for the greater goal of controlling the galaxy. Sidious desired to kill Plagueis, but refrained from doing so until acquiring all the possible knowledge from him.

==== Star Wars: Darth Plagueis ====
Star Wars: Darth Plagueis
- Author: James Luceno
- Language: English
- Series: Star Wars Legends
- Genre: Science fiction
- Publisher: Del Rey
- Publication date: January 10, 2012
- Publication place: United States
- Pages: 496
- ISBN: 0-345-51128-X
- Followed by: Star Wars: Maul: Lockdown

The character is the focus of Star Wars: Darth Plagueis, another Legends novel written by James Luceno and published on January 10, 2012. The novel covers the later life and machinations of Darth Plagueis (born Hego Damask II), over a roughly fifty-year period pre-dating and culminating concurrently with the climax of The Phantom Menace. The novel details Plagueis betraying and overthrowing his own master, Darth Tenebrous; his work as head of a powerful banking consortium on the Muun homeworld; his discovery, recruitment, and training of the teenaged Palpatine of Naboo; and the efforts of Plagueis to undermine the Galactic Republic and ensure the dominance of the dark side of the Force. Even though Plagueis' plans to deceive and undermine the Galactic Republic were stopped by Palpatine, who betrayed and murdered him, Palpatine still succeeded in wiping out the Galactic Republic and driving the Jedi Order into ruins for his own plans.

Daryl Thomen of Newsday called Darth Plagueis "the best Star Wars publication to date."
