= Star Wars: Episode III – Revenge of the Sith (novel) =

2005 novelization of the film of the same name

Star Wars: Revenge of the Sith
- Author: Matthew Stover
- Cover artist: Steve Anderson
- Language: English
- Series: Film novelizations Star Wars Legends (post-2014); Canon G (pre-2014)
- Subject: Star Wars
- Genre: Science fiction
- Publisher: Del Rey
- Publication date: Hardcover: April 2, 2005; Paperback: October 25, 2005
- Publication place: United States
- Media type: Hardcover & Paperback
- Pages: Hardcover: 432; Paperback: 480
- ISBN: 9780345428837
- Preceded by: Labyrinth of Evil
- Followed by: Dark Lord: The Rise of Darth Vader

Star Wars: Revenge of the Sith is a novelization of the film of the same name, written by Matthew Stover and published on April 2, 2005, by Del Rey Books.

The plot of the book corresponds with that of the film, beginning and ending at the same points. There are several elements added not seen in the film, while several sections of the plot are removed for pacing. All of the deleted scenes with the founders of the Rebel Alliance are included. Additional details from the Star Wars series' expanded universe are also referenced.

On April 25, 2014, the novelization of Star Wars: Revenge of the Sith was officially declared non-canon and categorized under the new Star Wars Legends canon.

== Narrative style ==
Stover makes frequent use of second-person narrative when describing a character's emotions and often introduces and describes characters with simple declarative statements. These literary devices are repeated at key points in the story.

There is also heavy use of metaphor as a means of foreshadowing; for example, the narrative sets up Anakin's eventual fall from grace by describing his fear and rage as a dragon, one he thinks he can conquer by embracing the dark side of the Force.

== Notable differences between the film and the novel ==
=== Fight with Count Dooku ===
The lightsaber fight between Anakin Skywalker, Obi-Wan Kenobi and Count Dooku is portrayed in far greater detail than in the film. Anakin and Obi-Wan pretend for much of the encounter to have learned nothing since the events of Attack of the Clones, but reveal late in the fight that they have each mastered different forms of lightsaber combat.

Stover depicts Dooku as a sociopath with solipsism, who sees other people either as things to be used or enemies to be dealt with. Stover makes reference to the Expanded Universe character Lorian Nod, Dooku's childhood friend introduced in Jude Watson's young adult novel Legacy of the Jedi. Stover also characterizes Dooku as being xenophobic towards the galaxy's non-human alien species, planning to exterminate them once in power.

During his duel with Anakin and Obi-Wan, Dooku uses the Force to throw chairs and other objects at the Jedi, which does not happen in the movie.

Before the fight itself, there is a short conversation between Dooku and Darth Sidious, revealing the plan Sidious used to lure Dooku into the confrontation with Anakin. Sidious tells Dooku that the objective of the duel is to kill Obi-Wan and surrender to Anakin, thus creating the a public story to allow the three of them to take over the galaxy, with Sidious and Dooku running a new empire, and Anakin leading its army. This is also the first scene in the Star Wars prequel novelizations to confirm Palpatine and Sidious as one and the same.

=== The Jedi Council ruling ===
The novelization elaborates on the Jedi Council's decision to use Anakin to spy on Palpatine. Obi-Wan is portrayed as opposing the decision, and going along with it only reluctantly, afterward expressing remorse for violating Anakin's trust. The scene also portrays the Council as having become a quasi-political body since the outbreak of the Clone Wars, making tactical decisions about military and political strategy rather than simply communing with the Force and interpreting its will.

=== The arrest of the Chancellor ===
The novelization includes additional details and deviations from the corresponding sequence in the film. First, Mace Windu contacts Yoda once more after learning the truth of Palpatine's identity, marking his upcoming actions as approved by the Grand Master of the Jedi Order. Then, when Anakin rushes to the Chancellor's office, he is confronted by Shaak Ti, who attempts to convince him to remain at the Jedi Temple as instructed. Both of these scenes are not in the movie.

During the duel, the Jedi Masters die of different wounds than are presented in the movie. Mace Windu similarly defeats Sidious with a different tactic, and destroys Sidious's lightsaber, rather than Sidious dropping it himself.

== Other key information found in the novel ==
- Names and details are given for the lightsaber techniques the characters use in their respective duels. All the seven lightsaber combat forms are mentioned and described except Form VI.
- Anakin wants to access the Holocrons of the Archives to know more about Darth Plagueis so that he can learn how to save Padmé. As the Holocrons are only available to Jedi Masters, this explains his outrage over not being promoted to the rank of Master when put on the Council.
- Palpatine tricks the Council into sending Obi-Wan to Utapau using reverse psychology by suggesting they send Anakin, as he knows he needs to get Obi-Wan off Coruscant before he can turn Anakin to the dark side.
- Yoda's retreat from Darth Sidious and eventual self-imposed exile to Dagobah is explained as a realization of the systemic failures of the Jedi Order and his personal failures in leading it.

== Reception ==
Revenge of the Sith was very well received, with a 4.4 star average at Amazon.com from over 350 reviewers, and voted Best Expanded Universe Work by TheForce.Net users. Liam Gaughan of Polygon called it "Star Wars’ best novelization," adding, "the brilliance of Stover’s novel isn’t in his additions; it’s in his contextualization. Lucas put many of the right pieces in place, but Stover presents them in a more forceful way — pun intended." Publishers Weekly summarizes, "Stover fills in the blanks regarding one of cinema's most fascinating villains with respect and relish, providing answers to such questions as why Vader looked so weird and how he became Luke's dad. This is the perfect companion to the blockbuster film."

The novel reached number three on The New York Times Best Seller list.
