= Cloak of Deception =

2001 novel by James Luceno

- Author: James Luceno
- Cover artist: Steven Anderson
- Language: English
- Series: Canon C
- Subject: Star Wars
- Genre: Science fiction
- Publisher: Del Rey Books
- Publication date: May 29, 2001
- Publication place: United States
- Media type: Print (Hardcover)
- ISBN: 0-345-44298-9 (hc.); 0-345-44297-0 (pbk.)
- Preceded by: Darth Maul: Saboteur
- Followed by: Darth Maul: Shadow Hunter

Cloak of Deception is a 2001 science fiction novel set in the Star Wars galaxy, written by American author James Luceno. It is a prequel occurring before the events of Star Wars: Episode I – The Phantom Menace. The cover art was by Steven Anderson. The book takes place 32.5 years before Star Wars: Episode IV – A New Hope. Narration for the audio version was performed by Alexander Adams. The paperback version included a 15-page excerpt of Enemy Lines: Rebel Dream.

== Synopsis ==
Under corrupt politics and ineffective bureaucracy in the Galactic Republicc, the Trade Federation has managed to dominate the outer shipping lanes whereas the Coruscant Senate is virtually nonfunctional. While many think that Valorum, the Supreme Chancellor, is somehow involved in the corruption, the Jedi Knight Qui-Gon Jinn and his padawan Obi-Wan Kenobi thwart an assassination plot against him.

With the crisis escalating, Valorum calls for an emergency trade summit. As humans and aliens gather, conspiracies sealed with large sums of money run rampant, and no one is entirely above suspicion. But the greatest threat of all remains unknown to everyone except three members of the Trade Federation, who have entered into a shadowy alliance with the Sith lord Darth Sidious. While the Federation will be content with more money and fewer problems, Sidious has grander, far more terrifying plans.

== Writing ==
While writing the novel, Luceno was granted access to parts of the screenplay drafts and concept art of Star Wars: Episode II – Attack of the Clones. As such, Cloak of Deception marked the first appearance in the series' chronological timeline of almost all of the new characters from Attack of the Clones, including the Techno Union, and other Separatists.

== Reception ==
SF Site summarized: "Star Wars: Cloak of Deception is a good sci-fi book and a decent political thriller."

The novel reached number ten on Billboard's and Publishers Weekly's bestseller lists, number twelve on The New York Times Best Seller list, and number nine on The Wall Street Journal's list.
