= Darth Vader =

Fictional character from Star Wars

- Star Wars character
- David Prowse as Darth Vader in The Empire Strikes Back (1980)
- First appearance: Star Wars: From the Adventures of Luke Skywalker (1976 novel)
- Created by: George Lucas
- Portrayed by: Various: Darth Vader: David Prowse; Spencer Wilding; Daniel Naprous; Hayden Christensen; Anakin Skywalker: Sebastian Shaw; Jake Lloyd; Hayden Christensen
- Voiced by: Various: Darth Vader: James Earl Jones; Brock Peters; Matt Sloan; Scott Lawrence; Fred Tatasciore; Maurice LaMarche; Anakin Skywalker: Matt Lanter; Mat Lucas; Frankie Ryan Manriquez; Hayden Christensen; Kirby Morrow; David Birney

In-universe information
- Full name: Anakin Skywalker
- Species: Human
- Gender: Male
- Occupation: Jedi Knight; Sith Lord
- Affiliation: Jedi Order; Galactic Republic; Sith Order; Galactic Empire
- Family: Shmi Skywalker (mother); Ben Solo (grandson)
- Spouse: Padmé Amidala
- Children: Luke Skywalker; Leia Organa
- Master: Obi-Wan Kenobi (as a Jedi); Darth Sidious (as a Sith)
- Apprentice: Ahsoka Tano (as a Jedi); Starkiller (Note: Star Wars Legends)
- Homeworld: Tatooine

Darth Vader (Note: Pronunciation: /dɑːrθ ˈveɪdər/) is a fictional character in the Star Wars franchise. He first appeared in the original Star Wars film (1977) (Note: Originally titled Star Wars, the film was later retitled Star Wars: Episode IV—A New Hope.) and its novelization (1976). He is a leader of the Galactic Empire, and is one of the two major villains in the original film trilogy. In the prequel trilogy, he transforms from the Jedi Knight Anakin Skywalker into the Sith Lord Darth Vader. His metamorphosis begins when he is lured to the dark side of the Force by Chancellor Palpatine, who later becomes the Galactic Emperor. After a lightsaber battle with his former mentor Obi-Wan Kenobi, Vader is severely injured and is transformed into a cyborg. He serves Palpatine for over two decades, hunting down the remaining Jedi and attempting to crush the Rebel Alliance. When Palpatine tries to kill Vader's son, Luke Skywalker, Vader turns against Palpatine and kills him. Vader is the husband of Padmé Amidala, the father of Luke and his twin sister Leia Organa, and the maternal grandfather of Ben Solo (later known as Kylo Ren). (Note: Attributed to multiple references:)

David Prowse physically portrays Vader in the original trilogy, while James Earl Jones provides his voice in all of the films and in other media. Sebastian Shaw portrays Anakin unmasked and as a ghost in Return of the Jedi (1983), while Jake Lloyd and Hayden Christensen portray Anakin in the prequel trilogy, with Christensen reprising the role in the series Obi-Wan Kenobi (2022) and Ahsoka (2023). In the standalone film Rogue One (2016), Vader is portrayed by Spencer Wilding and Daniel Naprous. Vader also appears in novels, comics, and video games, and has become an iconic character in cinema and popular culture. (Note: Attributed to multiple references:)

== Creation and development ==
=== Darth Vader ===
During pre-production of the original Star Wars film, (Note: Originally titled Star Wars, it was later retitled Star Wars: Episode IV—A New Hope.) its director, George Lucas, hired Ralph McQuarrie to create conceptual images for the characters. For Vader, Lucas asked McQuarrie to depict a "very tall, dark fluttering figure that had a spooky feeling like it came in on the wind." Because the script described Vader traveling between spaceships, McQuarrie suggested that he should wear a space suit. Lucas agreed, and McQuarrie created Vader's iconic mask by combining a full-face breathing mask with a samurai helmet. A 1975 production painting by McQuarrie depicts Vader engaged in a lightsaber duel with Deak Starkiller, who later became Luke Skywalker. Vader is shown wearing black armor, a flowing cape and a skull-like mask and helmet. This early design was similar to Vader's final appearance.

Working from McQuarrie's concepts, the costume designer John Mollo devised an outfit that combined clerical robes, a motorcycle suit, a German military helmet, and a military gas mask. The prop sculptor Brian Muir created the helmet and armor. The sound of Vader's breathing was created by the film's sound designer, Ben Burtt, using modified recordings of a scuba breathing apparatus. The sound effect is trademarked at the U.S. Patent and Trademark Office.

Lucas has provided differing accounts of how the name "Darth Vader" originated. In a 2005 interview with Rolling Stone, he claimed it was a modified version of "Dark Father." On another occasion, he said it was inspired by the phrase "Dark Water". It is also possible that "Darth Vader" originated from the name of Gary Vader, a boy who went to high school with Lucas.

The names of various Star Wars characters have been altered in countries outside the United States. In France, Vader's name was changed to Dark Vador (pronounced [daʁk vadɔʁ]) starting with the original film. Although the names of some other characters have been reverted to the English versions over the years, Vader is still referred to as Dark Vador in recent French-language Star Wars media. The title "Darth" has been replaced with "Dark" for other Sith Lords as well. In Italian-language editions of Star Wars films, Darth Vader was called Dart Fener (pronounced [ˌdar(t) ˈfɛːner]) starting with the original trilogy. In 2004, the dubbing director for the Italian-language version of Attack of the Clones, Claudio Sorrentino, asked Italian fans to decide which name to use in the upcoming Revenge of the Sith (2005), and the Italian name was chosen. However, the name was switched to "Darth Vader" for The Force Awakens (2015). In Iceland, Darth Vader's name is Svarthöfði, which means "black-head".

=== Anakin Skywalker ===
The films Swiss Family Robinson (1960) and Battle of the Bulge (1965) influenced the original Star Wars trilogy, but Lucas' publicist has denied that Anakin Skywalker was named after Ken Annakin, the director of those films. The original surname of Anakin and Luke was "Starkiller", and it remained in the script until a few months into filming Star Wars. It was dropped due to what Lucas called "unpleasant connotations" with Charles Manson, who became a "star killer" in 1969 when he murdered the well-known actress Sharon Tate. Lucas replaced the problematic name "Starkiller" with "Skywalker".

The 1999 film The Phantom Menace—the first film of the prequel trilogy—introduced the possibility that Anakin could be the Chosen One of an ancient Jedi prophecy, who is destined to bring balance to the Force. Lucas, who directed all three films in the trilogy, stated in an interview that "Anakin is the Chosen One. Even when Anakin turns into Darth Vader, he is still the Chosen One." Hayden Christensen said of Anakin: "He believes that he's the Chosen One. He's not doing wrong things knowing that it's having a negative impact. So there's that sort of naivety to him ... and it makes him more human in a lot of ways." Lucas has stated that the circumstances of Anakin's birth are mysterious to align him with heroes from mythology, such as Hercules.

After completing principal photography for Revenge of the Sith in 2003, Lucas made changes to Anakin's character by rewriting his turn to the dark side. He accomplished this through editing the principal footage and filming new scenes during pickups in London in 2004. In previous versions of the script, Anakin had several reasons for turning to the dark side, including his sincere belief that the Jedi were plotting to seize control of the Republic. Although he retains this belief in the finished film, Lucas' changes emphasized his desire to rescue Padmé from death. Thus, in the final version of Revenge of the Sith, Anakin falls to the dark side primarily to save Padmé.

In 2008, the character Anakin returned in the animated film Star Wars: The Clone Wars, which was directed by Dave Filoni. In an interview with Scientific American, Filoni described Anakin as less "dark and tormented" and closer to a hero in this film than in previous films. He called this version of Anakin a combination of Luke Skywalker and Han Solo, and he said that Anakin's relationship with his apprentice Ahsoka Tano is an essential story arc in both the film and the animated series that followed. Tara Salvati of Screen Rant describes the relationship between Anakin and Ahsoka as a "tight bond", and asserts that Anakin has "unwavering support" for her.

== Portrayals ==
=== Darth Vader ===
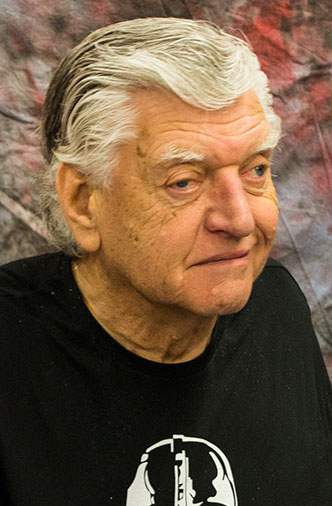
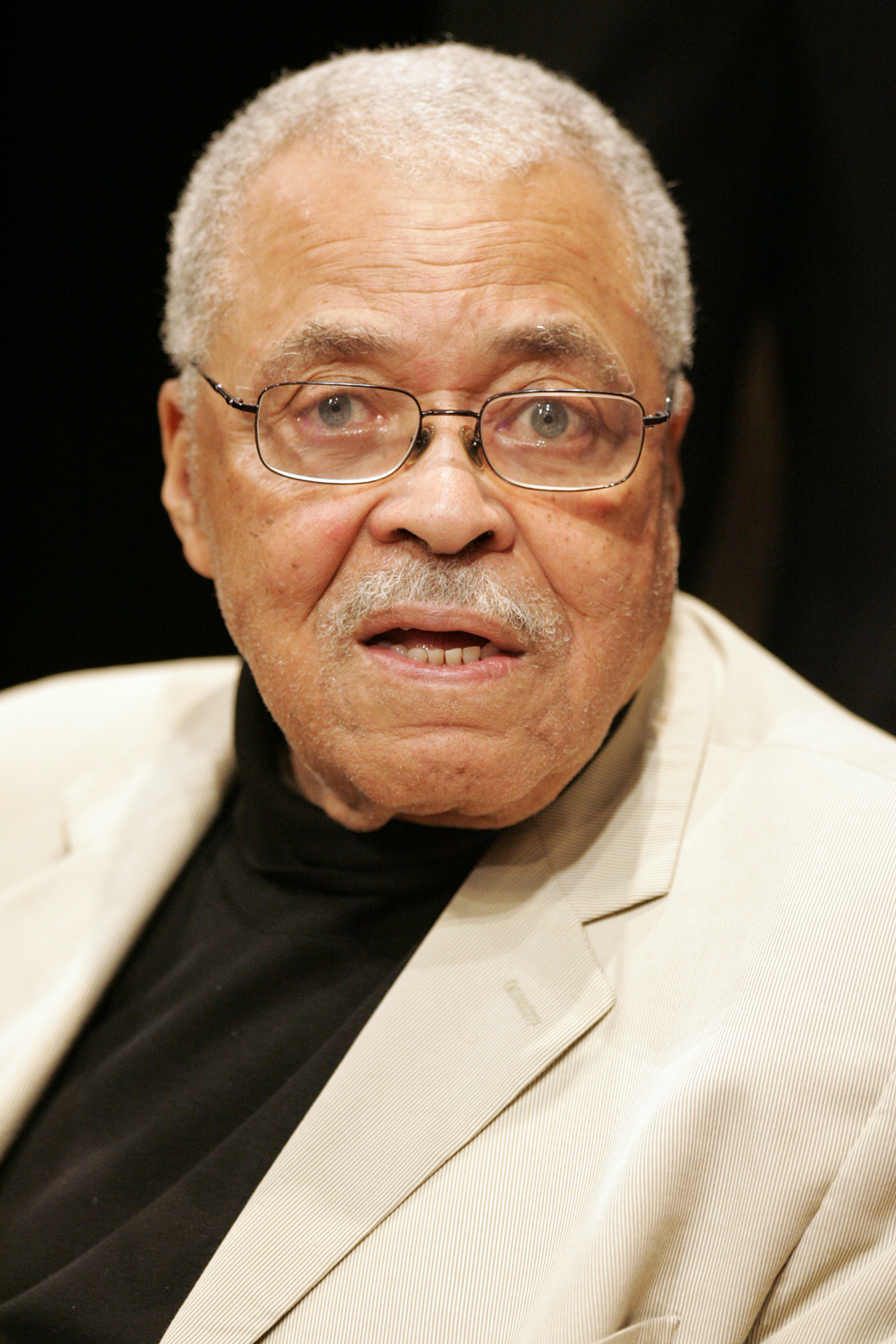
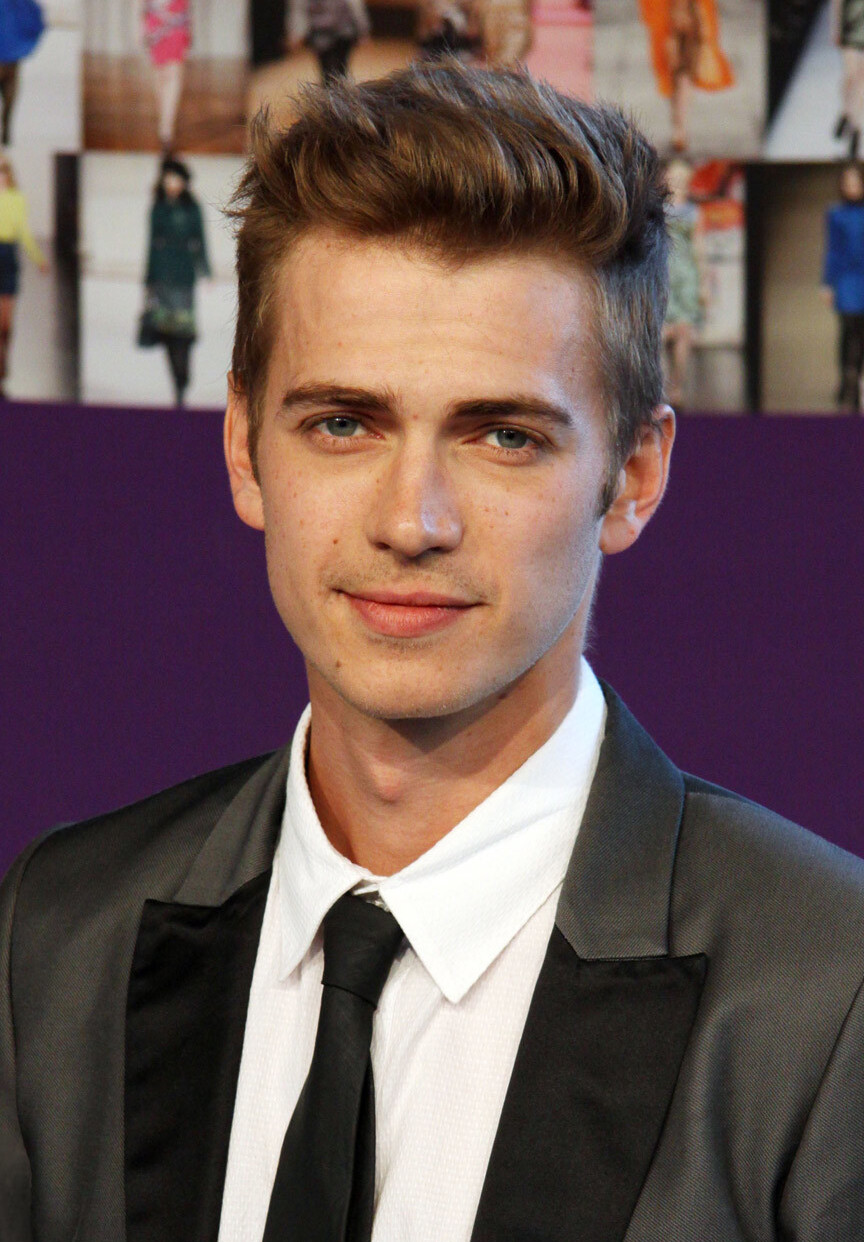
Left to right: David Prowse, James Earl Jones and Hayden Christensen

David Prowse, a 6-foot-6-inch (1.98 m) bodybuilder and actor, portrays Vader in the original trilogy. Prowse was originally offered the role of Chewbacca, but turned it down, as he wanted to play the villain. Bob Anderson, a former Olympic fencer, portrays Vader during lightsaber fight scenes in The Empire Strikes Back and Return of the Jedi. Lucas chose to have a different actor provide Vader's voice, because he felt Prowse's West Country English accent was inappropriate for the character. The director originally considered Orson Welles for the voice role, but selected James Earl Jones instead after deciding that Welles' voice would be too recognizable to audiences. Jones initially felt his role was too small to warrant recognition, and he chose to be uncredited in Star Wars and The Empire Strikes Back. He was finally credited in Return of the Jedi in 1983.

In The Empire Strikes Back, it is revealed that Vader is Luke's father. Due to the enormity of this plot twist, the filmmakers wanted to keep the revelation a secret until the film was released. Prowse was known for leaking sensitive information to the public, so Vader's revelation was concealed even from him. When filming the scene, he was asked to read the line "Obi-Wan killed your father" instead of "No, I am your father." Only the director, the producers, and Mark Hamill knew the actual line, which was dubbed in later by Jones. Prowse did not know the real line until he viewed the finished film.

Hayden Christensen portrays Vader in Revenge of the Sith, while Brock Peters provides his voice in the Star Wars radio series. Scott Lawrence voices Vader in video games, including the 2019 virtual reality series Vader Immortal. Matt Sloan voices the Sith Lord in both video games and television productions. Both Spencer Wilding and Daniel Naprous portray Vader in Rogue One, with Jones providing the voice. Jones also voices Vader in the Star Wars Holiday Special (1978) and the animated series Star Wars Rebels. In September 2022, it was confirmed that Jones would retire from voicing the character. His voice was digitally recreated by the company Respeecher for use in the series Obi-Wan Kenobi, and he later signed over the rights to his voice for future Star Wars productions.

=== Anakin Skywalker ===
Darth Vader unmasked, as portrayed by Sebastian Shaw in the 2004 DVD re-release of Return of the Jedi.

Near the end of Return of the Jedi, Luke removes Vader's mask. Although Prowse had portrayed the Sith Lord throughout the trilogy, the filmmakers wanted a more experienced actor to play the unmasked Vader. Sebastian Shaw was selected for the role, which is listed as "Anakin Skywalker" in the credits. Shaw's presence on set was kept secret from all but the minimum cast and crew, and Shaw was contractually obligated not to discuss any film secrets with anyone, even his family. In the final scene of the film, Shaw portrays Anakin's Force spirit. His likeness in this scene was replaced with that of Hayden Christensen in the 2004 DVD re-release.

When The Phantom Menace was being developed, hundreds of actors were auditioned for the role of young Anakin before Jake Lloyd was cast. Rick McCallum, the film's producer, said that Lloyd was "smart, mischievous and love[d] anything mechanical—just like Anakin." When casting the role of 19-year-old Anakin for Attack of the Clones, the filmmakers reviewed about 1,500 candidates before selecting Hayden Christensen, who reprises the role in Revenge of the Sith and in the two series Obi-Wan Kenobi and Ahsoka. Lucas considered Leonardo DiCaprio for the role, but DiCaprio declined. Christensen's performance in Revenge of the Sith garnered him a nomination for the Saturn Award for Best Actor, while his portrayal of Anakin in Obi-Wan Kenobi earned him the Saturn Award for Best Guest Performance in a Streaming Series.

Anakin is voiced by Mat Lucas and Frankie Ryan Manriquez in the 2003 animated micro-series Clone Wars, and by Kirby Morrow in several television productions. Matt Lanter provides the character's voice in video games and in various television productions, including The Clone Wars, Rebels, Forces of Destiny and Star Wars: Tales. Lanter also voices Anakin in the film version of The Clone Wars. During the second-season finale of Rebels, Lanter's voice is sometimes blended with the voice of James Earl Jones.

== Reception ==
In 2003, the American Film Institute listed Vader as the third greatest villain in cinema history on its 100 Years...100 Heroes & Villains list, behind Hannibal Lecter and Norman Bates. In 2010, IGN ranked Darth Vader 25th on its list of "Top 100 Videogame Villains". A writer for the African-American newspaper New Journal and Guide claimed in 1977 that due to Vader's black garb and his being voiced by a black actor, he reinforces a stereotype that "black is evil". A Mexican church advised Christians against seeing The Phantom Menace because they said it portrays Anakin as a Christ figure.

== Analysis ==
The French psychiatrist Eric Bui and his colleagues have considered Vader to be a useful example for explaining borderline personality disorder to medical students. Bui argues that Anakin meets the criteria to be diagnosed with the disorder, citing his impulsivity, difficulty controlling his anger, and his alternation between idealization and derealization, extreme fear of abandonment, and disassociative episodes. Bui's findings were corroborated by several other studies of Vader's character in the field of psychopathology. (Note: Attributed to multiple references:) However, the Brazilian neurologist Felipe Filardi da Rocha noted that the environment and culture that Anakin was raised in must be taken into account before making a formal diagnosis, and argued that other mental disorders should be considered as well.

Aspects of Anakin's origin story in The Phantom Menace have been compared to signifiers of African American racial identity, particularly his enslavement. Anakin's dissatisfaction with his life has been compared to Siddhartha Gautama's discontent before he became the Buddha. Brian A. Kinnaird of Psychology Today has written about the value of Vader's "redemptive sacrifice".

== Cultural impact ==
Vader has been used in political satire directed towards politicians and other public figures. In response to Ronald Reagan's proposed Strategic Defense Initiative (dubbed "Star Wars" by his political opponents), the German news magazine Der Spiegel portrayed Reagan wearing Vader's helmet on its cover in 1984. In 2005, former United States vice president Al Gore referred to John C. Malone of Tele-Communications Inc. as the "Darth Vader of cable", while political strategist Lee Atwater was known by his political enemies as "the Darth Vader of the Republican Party". Dick Cheney, who served as U.S. vice president under George W. Bush, has been compared to Vader because of his leading role in the 2003 invasion of Iraq. However, George Lucas said that Cheney is more similar to Palpatine, and that Bush would be a better stand-in for Vader.

The Internet Party of Ukraine has fielded multiple candidates for public office under the name Darth Vader. (Note: Two men named Darth Vader were candidates at the 2014 Kyiv mayoral election and the Odesa mayoral election of the same day.) Lord Buckethead, a character similar to Vader from the 1984 parody film Hyperspace, has been a novelty candidate in several British general elections, portrayed by three different people. Following a dispute over copyright, Buckethead portrayer Jonathan Harvey created a similar novelty candidate, Count Binface.

In 2026, the U.S. Department of Education and some right-wing figures—including Elon Musk, Katie Miller, and Guillaume Verdon—began posting images of Anakin Skywalker on social media. The Christian streamer Kangmin Lee said that Anakin represents the "archetypal disenfranchised chud" who believes the current political order is corrupt.

== Appearances ==
=== Original trilogy ===
Vader was introduced in Star Wars (1977) as a cyborg commander serving the Galactic Empire. He and Grand Moff Tarkin have been tasked with recovering architectural plans for the Death Star battle station, which were stolen by the Rebel Alliance. Vader captures and interrogates the Rebel leader Princess Leia, who has sent the plans to Vader's former master Obi-Wan Kenobi. During Leia's rescue by Obi-Wan's allies Luke Skywalker and Han Solo, Vader strikes down his former mentor in a lightsaber duel. After placing a tracking device aboard Han's ship, Vader locates the Rebel base on Yavin 4. When the Rebels attack the Death Star, Vader pursues Luke in his TIE fighter. Before he can shoot Luke down, however, Han intervenes and sends Vader's ship spiraling off course, which allows Luke to destroy the Death Star.

In The Empire Strikes Back (1980), set three years later, Vader has become obsessed with finding Luke, who is now a Rebel commander. Vader's forces assault the Rebel base on Hoth, but the Rebels escape. Vader convinces the Emperor that Luke could be a valuable ally if he were turned to the dark side of the Force. Vader engages bounty hunters to follow Luke's companions, and compels the Cloud City administrator Lando Calrissian to set a trap for them. After Han, Leia, Chewbacca and C-3PO arrive, Vader tortures and freezes Han in carbonite and gives him to the bounty hunter Boba Fett. When Luke lands on Cloud City to help his friends, Vader overpowers him and severs his hand. He tells Luke that he is his father, and tries to persuade him to turn to the dark side and help him overthrow the Emperor. Horrified, Luke escapes through an air shaft. Vader telepathically tells Luke that it is his destiny to join the dark side.

Vader and the Emperor supervise the construction of the second Death Star in Return of the Jedi (1983), set a year later. Believing there is still good in his father, Luke surrenders to Vader in an attempt to bring him back from the dark side. Vader takes his son to the Death Star and brings him before the Emperor, who attempts to seduce him to the dark side. Luke lashes out at the Emperor with his lightsaber, but Vader blocks his strike, and the two of them duel once again. As Luke regains control of his emotions, Vader senses that he has a sister, and threatens to turn her to the dark side if Luke will not submit. Enraged, Luke overpowers Vader and severs his hand. The Emperor then betrays his apprentice by ordering Luke to kill Vader and take his place, but Luke refuses.

Enraged, the Emperor begins torturing Luke with Force lightning, leading to Luke begging his father to save him. Unwilling to let his son die, Vader throws the Emperor down a reactor shaft to his death, but is mortally wounded in the process. Luke carries him to a docking bay, where Imperial forces are evacuating in the face of a Rebel assault. At Vader's request, Luke removes his father's mask and looks upon the face of Anakin Skywalker for the first time. On Endor, Luke burns his father's body on a funeral pyre. As the Rebels celebrate the destruction of the Death Star and the fall of the Empire, Luke sees Anakin's spirit appear alongside the spirits of Obi-Wan and Yoda.

=== Prequel trilogy ===
The first film of the prequel trilogy, The Phantom Menace (1999), takes place 32 years before Star Wars. (Note: Later retitled as Star Wars Episode IV—A New Hope.) Anakin Skywalker is introduced as a nine-year-old slave living on Tatooine with his mother Shmi. He is a gifted pilot and mechanic, and has built his own protocol droid, C-3PO. The Jedi Master Qui-Gon Jinn meets Anakin after making an emergency landing on Tatooine with Padmé Amidala, the queen of Naboo. Qui-Gon learns that Anakin was conceived without a father and can see the future. He becomes convinced that Anakin is the "Chosen One" of Jedi prophecy who will bring balance to the Force. After winning his freedom in a podrace wager, Anakin departs the planet with Qui-Gon to be trained as a Jedi, leaving his mother behind.

During the journey to Coruscant, Anakin forms a bond with Padmé. Qui-Gon asks the Jedi Council for permission to train Anakin, but they refuse, concerned that the fear he exhibits makes him vulnerable to the dark side. During a conflict with the Trade Federation, Anakin helps end the blockade of Naboo by destroying a control ship. Qui-Gon is mortally wounded in a duel with the Sith Lord Darth Maul, and with his dying breath asks his apprentice Obi-Wan Kenobi to train Anakin. With the council's reluctant approval, Anakin becomes Obi-Wan's apprentice. Palpatine, the newly elected Chancellor of the Galactic Republic, takes an interest in Anakin and his career as a Jedi.

Attack of the Clones (2002) is set ten years after The Phantom Menace. Anakin has grown powerful but arrogant, and believes that Obi-Wan is holding him back. After rescuing Padmé (now a senator) from an assassination attempt, he travels with her to Naboo as her bodyguard. They fall in love, despite a Jedi Code prohibition against romantic relationships. Sensing that his mother is in danger, Anakin travels with Padmé to Tatooine and finds that she was kidnapped by Tusken Raiders. He locates her at a Tusken campsite, where she dies in his arms. Overcome with grief and rage, Anakin massacres the Tusken tribe. Padmé is disturbed by what he has done, but comforts him nevertheless. Anakin and Padmé then go to Geonosis to help Obi-Wan, only to be captured by the Sith Lord Count Dooku. Facing execution, Anakin and Padmé profess their love for each other. They are saved from death by an army of Jedi and clone troopers, led by the Jedi Masters Mace Windu and Yoda. Anakin and Obi-Wan confront Dooku, but he defeats them both and severs Anakin's arm. After being rescued by Yoda, Anakin is fitted with a robotic arm and marries Padmé in a secret ceremony.

Hayden Christiansen as Anakin Skywalker in a promotional photo for Star Wars: Episode III – Revenge of the Sith (2005)

Revenge of the Sith (2005) is set three years after Attack of the Clones. Anakin, who is now a Jedi Knight and a hero of the Clone Wars, leads a mission with Obi-Wan to rescue Chancellor Palpatine from the Separatist commander General Grievous. The two Jedi again battle Count Dooku, whom Anakin overpowers and then kills at Palpatine's urging. Anakin returns to Coruscant to reunite with Padmé, who tells him she is pregnant. Although initially excited, Anakin soon begins to have nightmares about his wife dying in childbirth.

Palpatine appoints Anakin to the Jedi Council as his personal representative, but the council is suspicious of the Chancellor. They decline to grant Anakin the rank of Jedi Master and instruct him to spy on Palpatine, which upsets Anakin. Later, Palpatine reveals to Anakin that he is the Sith Lord Darth Sidious, the mastermind of the Clone Wars. He suggests that Anakin can prevent Padmé's death by using the dark side of the Force. Anakin reports Sidious' treachery to Windu, who confronts and subdues the Sith Lord. Desperate to save Padmé, Anakin betrays Windu by cutting off his hand, which allows Sidious to kill him. Anakin then pledges himself to the Sith, and Palpatine dubs him Darth Vader.

On Sidious' orders, Vader slaughters all the Jedi in the Jedi Temple, including the younglings, and assassinates the Separatist Council on Mustafar; these actions help Palpatine transform the Republic into the Galactic Empire. After learning what her husband has done, a distraught Padmé travels to Mustafar and pleads with him to abandon the dark side, but he refuses. Believing that Padmé and Obi-Wan are conspiring against him, Vader uses the Force to strangle his wife into unconsciousness. He then engages Obi-Wan in a lightsaber duel that ends with Obi-Wan severing his limbs and leaving him for dead on the banks of a lava flow, where he catches fire and sustains severe burns. Sidious finds the barely-alive Vader and takes him to Coruscant, where his mutilated body is covered in black armor that keeps him alive. When Vader asks if Padmé is safe, Sidious lies to him and says that his strangulation killed her, causing Vader to scream in anguish. At the end of the film, Vader supervises the construction of the first Death Star alongside Sidious and Tarkin.

=== The Clone Wars (film) ===
In the 2008 animated film The Clone Wars, set shortly after the events of Attack of the Clones, Yoda assigns Anakin an apprentice, Ahsoka Tano. Anakin is at first reluctant to accept this responsibility. He calls Ahsoka "Snips" for her "snippy" attitude, while Ahsoka refers to him as "Skyguy". After earning Anakin's respect during a dangerous mission, Ahsoka joins him on a quest to rescue Jabba the Hutt's infant son, Rotta. Her impetuousness both annoys and endears her to Anakin, and he develops a friendly affection towards her.

=== Sequel trilogy ===
In the first film of the sequel trilogy, The Force Awakens (2015), set thirty years after the events of Return of the Jedi, Vader's burned helmet is in the possession of his grandson Kylo Ren, second-in-command of the tyrannical First Order. Ren speaks to the helmet as if praying, asking his grandfather to help him fully commit to the dark side. He vows to follow in Vader's footsteps and finish his goal to destroy the Jedi.

Anakin's voice is heard briefly in the third film of the trilogy, The Rise of Skywalker (2019), which takes place a year later. During Rey's confrontation with the resurrected Palpatine, she hears the voices of various deceased Jedi, including Anakin. He encourages her to return balance to the Force like he once did.

=== Rogue One ===
In the standalone film Rogue One (2016), set immediately before the events of A New Hope, Vader summons the weapons developer Orson Krennic to his castle on Mustafar. He confronts him about his handling of the Death Star project and the destruction of Jedha City. When Krennic asks Vader for an audience with the Emperor, Vader refuses. At the end of the film, Vader boards a Rebel flagship and kills several Rebel soldiers as he tries to recover the stolen Death Star plans. Vader's role in the film was different in early versions of the story. In Gary Whitta's original pitch, the Sith Lord appeared on Scarif and slaughtered a Rebel blockade. In another early storyline, Vader killed Krennic for his failure to prevent the Rebels from stealing the Death Star schematics.

=== Television series ===
==== The Clone Wars ====
Anakin as he appears in The Clone Wars

Anakin is featured in all seasons of Star Wars: The Clone Wars (2008–2014, 2020), set between the events of Attack of the Clones and Revenge of the Sith. As a Jedi Knight, he leads the 501st Legion on missions with both his master Obi-Wan and his apprentice Ahsoka. Some of Anakin's actions taken out of concern for Ahsoka violate the Jedi code, such as torturing prisoners who may know her location. Throughout the series there are references to Anakin's eventual fall to the dark side, including visions of his future as Vader and his disillusionment with the Jedi Council after they wrongly accuse Ahsoka of bombing the Jedi Temple. Despite Ahsoka's name being cleared after Anakin finds the true culprit, she nonetheless chooses to leave the Jedi Order. Dooku's death at Anakin's hands during Revenge of the Sith is mentioned by Obi-Wan. Anakin appears as Vader in the final scene of the series finale, which occurs after Revenge of the Sith. He investigates the crash site of a Star Destroyer, which was demolished during Order 66. Finding one of Ahsoka's lightsabers among the wreckage, he assumes that his former Padawan has perished.

==== Star Wars Rebels ====
Vader appears in the animated series Star Wars Rebels (2014–2018), which takes place fourteen years after the conclusion of The Clone Wars. He makes minor appearances throughout the first season, and plays a larger role in the second season. At the beginning of the series, he leads a squad of Force-sensitive Imperial Inquisitors who kill Jedi and Force-sensitive children. Vader dispatches the Grand Inquisitor to hunt a Rebel cell on Lothal, and later arrives personally to deal with the Rebel threat after the Inquisitor is killed.

In the second-season premiere, Vader orchestrates the murder of Imperial Minister Maketh Tua, who tried to defect to the Rebellion, and confronts the two Jedi Kanan Jarrus and Ezra Bridger. Vader single-handedly decimates the Phoenix Squadron and discovers that Ahsoka is still alive and has joined the Rebel Alliance. She is overwhelmed when she recognizes Anakin under a "layer of hate". The Emperor then orders Vader to send another Inquisitor to capture her. Later in the season, Ahsoka has a vision in which Anakin blames her for his fall to the dark side. In the season finale, Ahsoka duels with Vader inside a Sith Temple. As the episode concludes, Vader emerges from the ruins of the temple, while Ahsoka's fate is left unknown.

==== Forces of Destiny ====
Anakin appears in multiple episodes of the animated web series Forces of Destiny (2017–2018).

==== Obi-Wan Kenobi ====
Hayden Christensen portrays both Anakin and Vader in the 2022 miniseries Obi-Wan Kenobi, set a decade after Revenge of the Sith and nine years before A New Hope. The series reveals that for a decade after their duel on Mustafar, Obi-Wan believed his fallen apprentice to be dead. While attempting to draw Obi-Wan out of hiding, the Imperial Inquisitor Reva Sevander tells him that Anakin is still alive. Vader begins hunting Obi-Wan, which eventually leads them to duel again. Although Vader initially overpowers his former master, Obi-Wan recovers his strength and wounds Vader multiple times. He slashes open Vader's helmet to partially reveal his face, then leaves him, weakened and wheezing. Flashback sequences in the series depict Anakin training under Obi-Wan in the years preceding the Clone Wars, as well as a newly minted Vader carrying out the massacre at the Jedi Temple.

==== Ahsoka ====
Hayden Christensen portrays Anakin in Ahsoka (2023), which takes place after the original trilogy. Anakin appears in spirit-form to his former apprentice Ahsoka in the World Between Worlds, an ethereal realm that exists outside of time and space. He leads her through visions of their shared past together, including her training, their battles during the Clone Wars, her departure from the Jedi Order and his fall to the dark side. Industrial Light and Magic used "de-aging" technology to make the 42-year-old Christensen appear younger.

==== Tales of the Empire ====
In the episode "Devoted", Vader makes a brief appearance overseeing the training of the Inquisitors.

==== Maul – Shadow Lord ====
In the animated series Star Wars: Maul – Shadow Lord (2026), Vader hunts down the former Sith Lord Maul on Janix. He duels Maul and two Jedi, Eeko-Dio Daki and Devon Izara. Vader kills Daki, but Maul escapes.

=== Video games ===
Vader is featured in the three-episode virtual reality game series Vader Immortal, which is set between Revenge of the Sith and Rogue One. The first episode became available with the launch of the Oculus Quest virtual reality headset in May 2019, while the last was released in November of the same year. The series was later released for the Oculus Rift. In August 2020, all three episodes were released for PlayStation VR.

Vader makes a brief appearance at the end of Jedi: Fallen Order (2019). He kills the Second Sister for her failure to secure a Jedi holocron that could lead the Empire to a number of Force-sensitive children. He then attempts to personally take the holocron from Cal Kestis, who barely manages to escape. Vader returns as a boss in the sequel, Jedi: Survivor (2023), where he leads an Imperial assault on a Jedi hideout on the planet Jedha. He duels Cere Junda, whom he manages to slay after a prolonged battle.

Both Vader and Anakin are playable characters in every Lego Star Wars video game. Vader is a playable character and a boss in Disney Infinity 3.0, and can be unlocked as a playable character for a limited time in Disney Magic Kingdoms. A bird version of Vader appears as a playable character and a boss in Angry Birds Star Wars and its sequel.

Darth Vader was added to Fortnite Battle Royale in 2022 as both a cosmetic outfit and as a non-playable character (NPC). In 2025, the Darth Vader NPC returned as part of the Star Wars: Galactic Battle season of Fortnite, with the added feature of allowing players to converse with the character, accomplished via generative AI modeled on James Earl Jones' voice. Additionally, an Anakin Skywalker outfit was added in 2023, and a Samurai Darth Vader outfit was added in 2024.

Anakin makes an appearance in Star Wars Zero Company (2026) with Matt Lanter reprising his role. Anakin takes part in a prisoner exchange between the Republic and the Separatist-aligned Umbaran Partisans on Bespin, but the Infinite Coil cult, also aligned with the Separatists, crashes the exchange and kills both the clone prisoner and Partisan leader Rhy Cesca for defying their leadership, whose lover Luco Bronc was exchanged by the Republic. The mercenary group Zero Company's leader Tesh Hawks, who infiltrated the exchange as part of their contract with Republic Intelligence to investigate and eliminate the cult, works together with Anakin and Luco to repel the Coil invasion, while Luco joins Zero Company to seek vengeance against Rhy's murderers. Anakin later visits their headquarters at the Ring of Kafrene to discuss the Coil with Hawks while also encountering Salveren Hadrix's Padawan Tel-Rea Vokoss, whom he asks why she left the Jedi Order behind. Instead of turning her over to the Jedi, he provides her with a holocron containing her master's notes on the cult's Shadow Plague disease and offers to stall the Jedi Council to buy her time to complete her investigation together with Zero Company before departing.

=== Novels ===
Star Wars: Lords of the Sith was one of four canon novels released between 2014 and 2015. In it, Vader and Palpatine find themselves hunted by revolutionaries on the planet Ryloth. Vader also appears in Thrawn: Alliances (2018), which depicts his mission with Grand Admiral Thrawn following the events of the third season of Rebels. The novel also features a parallel storyline of Anakin, Padmé, and Thrawn working together during the Clone Wars.

=== Comics ===
The 25-issue Marvel comic series Darth Vader (2015–2016) focuses on the Sith Lord in the aftermath of the Death Star's destruction, as well as his life after learning about his son's existence. The series takes place parallel to the 2015 series Star Wars, in which Vader and Luke meet; the two series have a crossover titled Vader Down. A continuation series set between The Empire Strikes Back and Return of the Jedi debuted in 2020. The first few issues focus on Vader exacting revenge on those who concealed Luke; he also visits Padmé's tomb on Naboo and encounters her handmaidens. A subsequent story arc depicts Vader being tested by the Emperor. The five-issue series Obi-Wan & Anakin (2016) depicts the lives of the two Jedi between The Phantom Menace and Attack of the Clones.

Between 2017 and 2018, Charles Soule wrote a prequel-era series, also called Darth Vader (sometimes subtitled Dark Lord of the Sith). It begins immediately after Vader wakes up in his armor at the end of Revenge of the Sith and explores his emotional transformation upon learning of Padmé's death, his adjustment to his mechanical suit, how he creates his red-bladed lightsaber, and his hunting of Jedi in the Inquisitor program. Its final arc, which depicts the construction of Vader's fortress on Mustafar, implies that Palpatine used the Force to conceive Anakin in utero, as some had theorized that Revenge of the Sith indicates. (Note: In the film, Palpatine tells Anakin about Darth Plagueis the Wise, "a Dark Lord of the Sith so powerful and so wise, he could use the Force to influence the midi-chlorians to create life." This was preceded by the rough draft of Revenge of the Sith, in which Palpatine tells Anakin upon his fall to the dark side, "I arranged for your conception. I used the power of the Force to will the midi-chlorians to start the cell divisions that created you. ... You could almost think of me as your father.") A Lucasfilm story group member later clarified that "This is all in Anakin's head". (Note: Soule elaborated that "The Dark Side is not a reliable narrator.")

A five-issue limited series titled Vader: Dark Visions, was released in 2019. Vader Down writer Jason Aaron wrote part of the miniseries Darth Vader: Black, White & Red, an extension of a Marvel event highlighting fan-favorite characters.

== Star Wars Legends ==
Following the acquisition of Lucasfilm by The Walt Disney Company in 2012, most of the licensed Star Wars Expanded Universe material produced between 1977 and 2014 was rebranded as Star Wars Legends and declared non-canon to the franchise. The Legends works comprise a separate narrative universe. (Note: Attributed to multiple references:)

=== Books ===
Vader is featured prominently in novels set in the Star Wars universe. In the 1978 novel Splinter of the Mind's Eye by Alan Dean Foster, Vader meets Luke for the first time and engages him in a lightsaber duel that ends with Luke cutting off Vader's arm and Vader falling into a deep pit. Shadows of the Empire (1996) reveals that Vader is conflicted about trying to turn his son to the dark side, and knows deep down that he still has good in him.

Vader's supposedly indestructible glove is the MacGuffin of the young-reader's book The Glove of Darth Vader (1992). Anakin Skywalker's redeemed spirit appears in The Truce at Bakura (1993), set a few days after the end of Return of the Jedi. He appears to Leia, imploring her forgiveness. Leia condemns Anakin for his crimes and banishes him from her life. He promises that he will be there for her when she needs him, and disappears. In Tatooine Ghost (2003), Leia learns to forgive her father after learning about his childhood as a slave and his mother's traumatic death. In The Unifying Force (2003), Anakin tells his grandson Jacen Solo to "stand firm" in his battle with the Supreme Overlord of the Yuuzhan Vong.

Upon the release of the prequel films, the Expanded Universe grew to include novels about Vader's former life as Anakin. Greg Bear's 2000 novel Rogue Planet, Timothy Zahn's 2006 novel Outbound Flight, and Jude Watson's Jedi Quest series chronicle Anakin's early missions with Obi-Wan, while James Luceno's 2005 novel Labyrinth of Evil, set during the Clone Wars, depicts Anakin battling Separatist commander General Grievous. In Luceno's Dark Lord: The Rise of Darth Vader (2005), set a few months after the events of Revenge of the Sith, Vader disavows his identity as Anakin as he hunts down surviving Jedi and cements his position in the Empire.

In the Dark Nest trilogy (2005), Luke and Leia uncover old recordings of their parents in R2-D2's memory drive; for the first time, they see their own birth and their mother's death, as well as their father's corruption to the dark side. In Bloodlines (2006), Han and Leia's son Jacen—who has turned to the dark side—uses the Force to envision Vader slaughtering the children at the Jedi Temple.

Vader also appears in a series of tongue-in-cheek children's books by Jeffrey Brown. In Brown's series, a hapless Vader sets out to be a father to a young Luke and Leia, with some scenes portraying light-hearted versions of their darker film counterparts. For example, one scene shows Vader, Luke and Leia at the carbonite freezing chamber on Bespin, with Vader pronouncing the freezer adequate for making ice cream.

=== Comics ===
Vader appears in several comic books such as Marvel Comics' Star Wars (1977–1986). In Dark Empire II, he is revealed to have had a castle on the planet Vjun. Anakin Skywalker is a major character in Dark Horse Comics' Star Wars: Republic series (1998–2006). In Boba Fett: Enemy of the Empire (1999), Vader hires Fett a few years before the events of A New Hope. In Vader's Quest (1999), set soon after A New Hope, Vader encounters Luke for the first time. (Note: In Marvel's 1977 series, Vader learns Luke's surname from a Rebel deserter, before later obtaining his first name. Vader's Quest sees him learning Luke's surname from a captured Rebel. In 2013's Star Wars, Vader hears Luke's name in a vision of his duel with Kenobi on the Death Star. In the current comic canon, Boba Fett tells Vader Luke's surname.) Star Wars: Empire (2002–2005) spans from about a year before A New Hope to several months afterwards. Anakin and Vader appear in the non-canonical Star Wars Tales (1999–2005); in the story Resurrection, Darth Maul is resurrected and faces Vader in battle.

Vader-centric comics released and set just after Revenge of the Sith include Dark Times (2006–2013), Darth Vader and the Lost Command (2011), Darth Vader and the Ghost Prison (2012), and Darth Vader and the Cry of Shadows (2013–14).

=== Clone Wars ===
Anakin is featured in all three seasons of the Clone Wars micro-series (2003–2005), which takes place shortly after the conclusion of Attack of the Clones. Anakin becomes a Jedi Knight and is quickly promoted to General of the Republic, due in part to Palpatine's influence. Among other missions, he fights a duel with Dooku's apprentice Asajj Ventress, helps Obi-Wan capture a Separatist-controlled fortress, and rescues the Jedi Master Saesee Tiin during a space battle. During the third season, Anakin frees a planet's indigenous species from Separatist control and sees a cryptic vision of his future as Darth Vader. In the series finale, Anakin and Obi-Wan embark on a mission to rescue Palpatine from General Grievous, which leads into the opening of Revenge of the Sith. The series was removed from canon in 2014 and placed in the Legends universe.

=== Video games ===
Vader plays a central role in the Legends game Star Wars: The Force Unleashed (2008), where he is playable in the first level and later appears as a boss. The game's main character, Galen Marek, or Starkiller, is Vader's secret apprentice. Vader also appears in the sequel, Star Wars: The Force Unleashed II (2010), as the final boss.

== Other appearances ==
The Star Wars Holiday Special, a television special broadcast by CBS in 1978, features a brief appearance of Darth Vader, who speaks with Imperial officer "Chief Bast" in footage that was cut from the original 1977 film. The sequence was dubbed with new dialogue, performed by James Earl Jones. In the program's plot, Vader colludes with Boba Fett to entrap the Rebels.

Both Vader and Anakin appear in various Lego Star Wars shorts. Matt Sloan voices Vader and Kirby Morrow voices Anakin.

Vader appears in the 1981 radio drama adaptation of Star Wars, voiced by Brock Peters. Vader makes his first appearance on the planet Ralltiir, where he treats Princess Leia with suspicion. In later extended scenes, he is heard interrogating and torturing Leia on board his Star Destroyer and aboard the Death Star.

== See also ==
- List of Star Wars characters
- Skywalker family
- Star Wars books
- Star Wars comics
- Star Wars video games
