= Coruscant =

Fictional planet in Star Wars

- Star Wars location
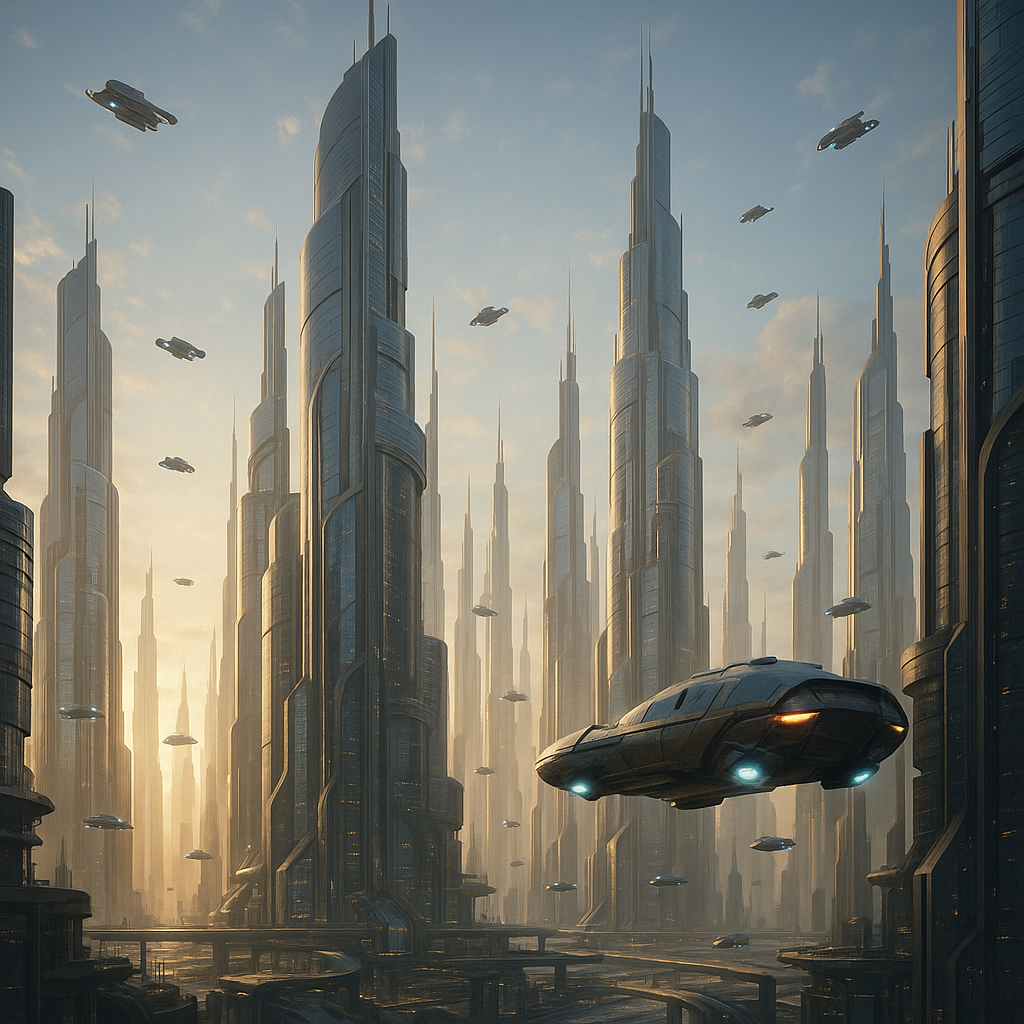
- First appearance: Legends: Star Wars #61 (1982) (retcon); Heir to the Empire (1991); Canon: Return of the Jedi (1997 special edition)
- Created by: George Lucas; Timothy Zahn
- Genre: Science fiction

In-universe information
- Type: Urban (planetwide ecumenopolis)
- Ruled by: Tarsus Valorum (around 1000 BBY); Finis Valorum (40 BBY–32 BBY); Sheev Palpatine (32 BBY–4 ABY; Supreme Chancellor, later Galactic Emperor)
- Races: Human (indigenous; homeworld presumably); Taung (historically); Zhell (historically)
- Characters: Mas Amedda; Padmé Amidala; Jar Jar Binks; C-3PO; Qui-Gon Jinn; Syril Karn; Obi-Wan Kenobi; Dedra Meero; Mon Mothma; Sheev Palpatine; R2-D2; Luthen Rael; Anakin Skywalker; Mara Jade Skywalker; Ahsoka Tano; Mace Windu; Yoda several others
- Population: 2 trillion (68% Human, 32% other sentients)
- Moon(s): 4 (Centax-1, Centax-2, Centax-3 and Hesperdium)
- Oceans: 0
- Sun(s): Coruscant Prime
- Grid Coordinates: L-9
- XYZ Coordinates: 0,0,0

Coruscant (/ˈkɒrəsɑːnt/) (Note: Before The Phantom Menace was produced, the "sc" had a pronunciation like a "sk" in Star Wars merchandise such as the Thrawn trilogy audiobooks. The rare English word "coruscant" ("glimmering") is pronounced /kəˈrʌskənt/ kə-RUSS-kənt.) is an ecumenopolis planet in the fictional universe of Star Wars. It was first described in Timothy Zahn's 1991 novel Heir to the Empire. The planet made its first on-screen appearance in a scene added to Return of the Jedi for its 1997 re-release. It has since become an important location in the Star Wars universe and appears frequently in Star Wars media.

In-universe, Coruscant is a politically and strategically important planet, serving as the capital and seat of government for the Republic and the Galactic Empire, as well as the headquarters of the Jedi Order. It is depicted as a bustling, yet highly stratified planet-spanning metropolis. Throughout the city's centuries-long development, new city blocks were built on top of old ones, forming levels. Coruscant has 5127 levels, with the top being the wealthiest and the lowest being the poorest.

Coruscant has four moons and is the sixth planet out of the eleven that make up the system of the same name. It lies within the Coruscant Subsector of the Corusca Sector, located in the Core Worlds galactic quadrant region. The sun, Coruscant Prime, is the zero coordinate of the Star Wars galaxy (as opposed to being its galactic center). In Legends, Coruscant was once referred to as Notron or Queen of the Core. It was renamed Imperial Center during the reign of the Galactic Empire (as depicted in the original films) and Yuuzhan'tar during the Yuuzhan Vong invasion (as depicted in the New Jedi Order novel series). Initially, the planet's capital city was Galactic City (built at least in 100,000 BBY, (Note: BBY: Before the Battle of Yavin depicted in Episode IV: A New Hope) partially destroyed in 27 and 44 ABY). (Note: ABY: After the Battle of Yavin depicted in A New Hope) It was Imperial City under the Galactic Empire and was Republic City (or the City of Spires) under the Galactic Republic. The planet was code-named Triple Zero during the Clone Wars. The demonym and adjective form of the planet's name is Coruscanti.

Many native citizens of Coruscant speak with the Received Pronunciation accent (known in-universe as Coruscanti).

== Etymology and naming ==
In the Star Wars universe, the planet Coruscant derives its name from a rare and valuable gemstone, the corusca gem (a fictional gem in Star Wars lore). The lights of the planet-wide city, as seen from space, were said to resemble the glittering of these gems.

In the real world, the word "coruscant" (/kəˈɹʌskənt/, ke-RUSS-kent) originates in the late 15th century from the Latin word coruscant, meaning "vibrating, glittering". It comes from the Latin verb coruscare, meaning "to glitter". The Concise Oxford Dictionary defines it as a poetic and literary adjective meaning "glittering; sparkling". In French, "coruscant" is also used as an adjective meaning "glittering; sparkling". As a literary adjective, the French term can be used to describe a decadent and overly complicated language, decorum, or community.

== Early concepts ==
The concept of a city-planet in the Star Wars universe originated with the initial drafts of Star Wars when author George Lucas included a planet called Alderaan, a city-planet and the capital planet of the galaxy. In Lucas's 1975 draft, Adventures of the Starkiller as taken from the Journal of the Whills, Saga I: The Star Wars, the capital planet of Alderaan is described as a floating city in the clouds, "suspended in a sea of cirrus methane". This concept was illustrated in early sketches commissioned by Lucas from conceptual artist Ralph McQuarrie, and the design very closely resembles Cloud City, the floating city featured in The Empire Strikes Back. In Lucas's third draft, the Imperial City of Alderaan became the homeworld of the Sith Lords, where Darth Vader held Princess Leia captive. Lucas continued to hone his script, aided by screenwriters Willard Huyck and Gloria Katz. By the fourth draft, scenes on the Imperial capital planet had been moved to a space station called the Death Star and the name of Alderaan was given to a peaceful world destroyed by the Empire. The Empire's homeworld, Had Abbadon, came up in early drafts of Return of the Jedi. The entire planet was to be a sprawling city. However, concluding that the realization of such a city was impossible at the time, the creators abandoned the idea. Later, in the graphic novel Legacy 29: Vector, Part 10 the name Had Abbadon was given to a lost mythic planet in the Had Abbadon System of the Deep Core. This mythic planet was covered by dry fields, linked to the birth of the Jedi, and the location of a planned assassination attempt by Cade Skywalker on Darth Krayt.

The Empire's homeworld first appeared in the Star Wars Expanded Universe and was called Coruscant for the first time in Timothy Zahn's Heir to the Empire.

In various novels, characters aligned with the Empire refer to Coruscant as the "Imperial Center". Within the stories, this is explained as an administrative renaming undertaken to emphasize the differences between the Old Republic and the Empire.

Coruscant was in some early sources called "Jhantor" in homage to Isaac Asimov's Trantor.

== Design ==
Production artwork produced by Ralph McQuarrie for Return of the Jedi included some unrealized designs for the imperial capital, Had Abbadon. During the production of The Phantom Menace, it was decided that scenes would be set on the capital planet, now called Coruscant. Artist Doug Chiang was tasked with designing the imperial city for which he turned to McQuarrie's original concept art. The appearance of the cityscape has been described as a "retro-futuristic metropolis", and the streams of floating vehicles traveling between soaring skyscrapers is thought to have been partly inspired by Fritz Lang's 1927 film, Metropolis.

In Attack of the Clones, the depiction of Coruscant was expanded greatly. Chiang created a more urban, apocalyptic environment for the street level, taking inspiration from Ridley Scott's 1982 hit film Blade Runner.

For the television series Andor, VFX supervisor Scott Pritchard chose to move away from the "high science fiction" depiction of Coruscant seen in the prequel trilogy and instead opted for a more realistic and grounded take on the planet's cityscape, inspired by New York City's Art Deco stone buildings. Real world locations in London, such as the Barbican Centre and Canary Wharf, were used for filming scenes on Coruscant and were later extended or augmented with CGI.

== Appearances ==
=== Episode VI: Return of the Jedi ===
Coruscant is the location of a sequence added to the 1997 Special Edition release of Return of the Jedi, its first onscreen appearance. The sequence depicts the reaction of citizens of Coruscant upon hearing of the death of Emperor Palpatine, where many citizens are seen celebrating with fireworks and pulling down his statue. The 1998 novel X-Wing: Iron Fist included an eyewitness account of this scene.

=== Episode I: The Phantom Menace ===
Coruscant was prominently featured in Star Wars: Episode I – The Phantom Menace as the location of the Galactic Republic Senate building and the central Jedi Temple.

=== Episode II: Attack of the Clones ===
There is a speeder chase through the skies of Coruscant in Episode II: Attack of the Clones that eventually leads to a nightclub in the bowels of Coruscant's Uscru Entertainment District. Another area of Coruscant shown is Coco Town (short for "collective commerce"). Coco Town is the site of Dex's Diner in Attack of the Clones. Another notable area of Coruscant is 500 Republica, an area where the elites of the city, such as politicians and diplomats, gather.

=== Episode III: Revenge of the Sith ===
In Episode III: Revenge of the Sith, Coruscant is featured in a space battle (known as the Battle of Coruscant) during the opening scene. Separatist cyborg, General Grievous kidnaps Chancellor Palpatine and uses the Separatist fleet to help assault the capital and cover his escape.

The planet's cityscape is then prominently featured throughout much of the movie with Chancellor Palpatine's office as well as the Senate building being the primary two settings on Coruscant. A theatre in 500 Republica is where Anakin Skywalker and Palpatine watch a ballet; during the show, Palpatine encourages Skywalker to ally with the Dark Side by telling him of the supposed Sith ability of resuscitation.

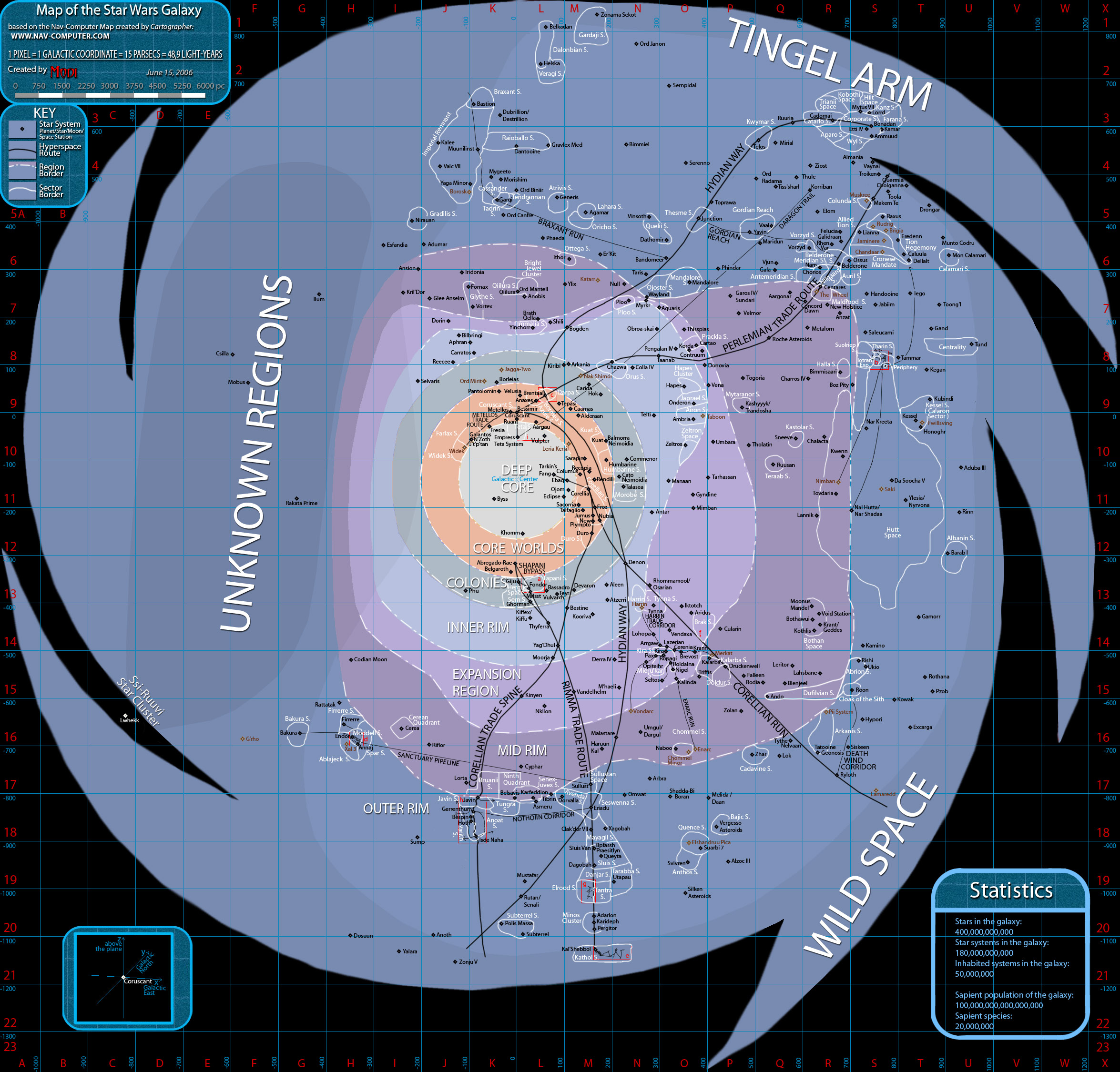
Map of the Star Wars galaxy; Coruscant's XYZ coordinates are designated 0,0,0 and the grid coordinates are L-9.

After a failed attempt by the Jedi to arrest Palpatine when he divulges his true identity as Darth Sidious to Skywalker, Palpatine appoints himself Emperor of the first Galactic Empire in the Republic Senate Building on Coruscant.

=== Star Wars: The Clone Wars (2003 and 2008 TV series) ===
Coruscant features prominently in both the 2003 traditionally-animated Clone Wars series and the 2008 animated The Clone Wars series, as the headquarters of the Jedi Temple and the Senate.

=== Rogue One: A Star Wars Story ===
In Rogue One, Jyn Erso has a flashback of her young self on Coruscant.

=== Obi-Wan Kenobi ===
In Obi-Wan Kenobi, Coruscant makes its first extensive live-action appearance in the Star Wars saga since the prequel trilogy. Coruscant is prominent in a montage of footage from the Star Wars prequel films, and the Jedi Temple of Coruscant is the setting of several scenes.

=== Andor ===
Coruscant is a prominent setting in Andor. The majority of Mon Mothma, Dedra Meero, and Syril Karn's scenes take place on Coruscant. It is also the location of Luthen Rael's antiques shop, where he publicly poses as its proprietor while also secretly operating as the Axis network's spymaster to unite the scattered and conflicting insurgent groups across the galaxy into the Rebel Alliance.

=== Tales of the Jedi ===
In Tales of the Jedi, Coruscant appears prominently in three of the six episodes. Count Dooku and Mace Windu attend the funeral of Council Member Katri at the Jedi Temple, Ahsoka Tano is shown extensively training for combat in the same location, and the final lightsaber duel between Master Yaddle and Count Dooku takes place in Darth Sidious' manufacturing-district lair. In one scene, Dooku remarks upon the fact that Coruscant is a planet of "Steel and Stone", lacking much in the way of wild nature; Qui-Gon Jinn, who was born there, had never seen a tree before visiting the Jedi Temple for the first time as a boy.

=== The Mandalorian ===
In the 19th episode of The Mandalorian, Coruscant is featured as a New Republic capital. On Coruscant, we are re-introduced to Dr. Penn Pershing and Elia Kane, a former communications officer on Moff Gideon's cruiser, who are now revealed to be a part of the New Republic Amnesty program. We are also introduced to the Shipyard Depot, a salvage yard where decommissioned Star Destroyers are being dismantled.

=== Other works ===
Coruscant appears as the background of a space battle in Lego Star Wars: The Complete Saga.

In Lego Star Wars: The Skywalker Saga, players can visit Coruscant's Federal and Uscru Districts.

In the prologue of the comic series Dark Empire (1991), set after the original film trilogy, Coruscant is ravaged by battles between warring Imperial factions.

Coruscant appears as the opening level in 2023's Star Wars: Jedi Survivor. Cal Kestis is tasked with tracking down Senator Daho Sejan, the player chasing after the senator's yacht until catching up with it.

Coruscant is seen in the X-Wing series of computer games.

Concept art by Ralph McQuarrie served as the basis for the pyramidal Imperial Palace, depicted in The Illustrated Star Wars Universe (1995) by Kevin J. Anderson, which claims it is "the largest structure on Coruscant, perhaps on any planet". According to the Star Wars Encyclopedia (1998), it is located next to the Senate building. Although this version of the Imperial Palace appears in a variety of Expanded Universe works, in canon, the Imperial Palace is located at the site of the former Jedi Temple, where Palpatine resides.

In The New Jedi Order series (1999–2003), Coruscant is the capital world of the New Republic until, in The New Jedi Order: Star by Star, the extragalactic Yuuzhan Vong overwhelm the New Republic defenses in three attack waves led by Warmaster Tsavong Lah who takes over the planet, destroying the New Republic and creating the theocratic Yuuzhan Vong Empire. After surrendering, the Yuuzhan Vong agreed to help the Alliance rebuild Coruscant. The new Coruscant is a combination of technology and organic life representing the peace between the Galactic Federation of Free Alliances (Galactic Alliance) and the Yuuzhan Vong.

James Luceno's novel Labyrinth of Evil (2005) introduces a deserted manufacturing area known as 'The Works' as the meeting place for Sith Lords Darth Sidious (Palpatine) and Darth Tyranus.

With the 2012 acquisition of Lucasfilm by The Walt Disney Company, most of the licensed Star Wars novels and comics produced since the originating 1977 film Star Wars were re-branded as Star Wars Legends and declared non-canon to the franchise in April 2014.

== Geography ==
Coruscant is inspired by Trantor, which builds downwards, digging into the earth. In comparison, Coruscant builds upwards and doesn't have a fixed top layer. Every few centuries, equal to hundreds levels, a new mega level is added that covers the previous layer.

=== Notable metropolitan areas ===
==== Senate District ====
The Senate District (also sometimes referred to as the Federal District) is located on the planet's equator, and is known to contain numerous notable sites such as the Ambassadorial Sector (canonically home to 500 Republica and the Senate Apartment Complex), Embassy Mall, the Coruscant Opera House, the Galactic Museum, the Heorem Complex (where the Heorem Skytunnel is located), Judicial Plaza (home to the Glitanni Esplanade and the Judicial Arcology), the Legislative Borough, Senate Plaza, the Avenue Of The Core Founders, the Republic Executive Building, the Galactic Senate Building, Hospital Plaza, the Galactic Senate, the Palace District (home to the Imperial Palace and Senate Hill), Quadrant A-89 (home to the CSF HQ), the Fellowship Plaza, the Galactic Justice Center and the Temple Precinct (home to the Jedi Temple), Sector H-52, Sector I-33, the Uscru Boulevard, Westport and Xizor's Palace.

The Senate District is depicted as the de facto capital of Coruscant, the Old Republic, the Galactic Empire, the New Republic, the Galactic Federation Of Free Alliances, and the One Sith. It is shown bordering the Financial District and the Sah'c District and is also adjacent to The Works (an industrial sector on the planet). The Senate District is also referred to as the Legislative District, Government District, and Government Center.

==== Alien Protection Zone ====
The Alien Protection Zone is referenced as a walled ghetto on Coruscant of an unknown location, housing the planet's non-human population. Neighborhoods within the zone are shown representing the cultures of these minority groups. The Alien Protection Zone was constructed in 19 BBY by the Galactic Empire and opened by the New Republic in 6 ABY.

==== Sah'c Town ====
Sah'c Town, also known as Sah'c District or Quadrant H-46, is an area described as situated on the Equator, named after and controlled by the wealthy Sah'c family. It was home to an emergency bunker where the chancellor of the Galactic Republic or New Republic ruled in case of emergencies. The area also contains Sah'c Canyon, which is the exit point of the Senate District's Heorem Skytunnel.

==== Uscru District ====
The Uscru District appears in Attack of the Clones, Revenge of the Sith, and Lego Star Wars: The Skywalker Saga. On its upper levels, it hosts the Galaxy's Opera House. The district's lower levels were collectively referred to as the Entertainment District. The Outlander Club, seen in Attack of the Clones and mentioned in Jedi: Fallen Order, is in the Entertainment District.

==== Manorai Plaza ====
Coruscant is a multi-layer cityscape blanketing the entire planet's surface: there's no forest or sea. A notable exception to this is Manorai Plaza that's on level 5216; the summit of Mount Umate the Manorai Mountain Range, an exposed peak in a plaza; the highest natural elevation and one of the last remaining natural landscapes, as depicted in Star Wars Andor.

== Theme park attraction ==
Coruscant also appears as one of the in–ride "destination planets" in the theme park attraction Star Tours – The Adventures Continue in Disney's Hollywood Studios at Walt Disney World Resort in Orlando, Florida, and Disneyland Park at Disneyland Resort in Anaheim, California.

== See also ==
- Ecumenopolis
- List of Star Wars planets and moons
- Star Wars 1313
- Trantor
