= Dark Lord: The Rise of Darth Vader =

2005 novel by James Luceno

- Author: James Luceno
- Language: English
- Series: Canon C
- Genre: Science fiction
- Publisher: Del Rey
- Publication date: Hardcover: November 22, 2005; Paperback: June 27, 2006
- Publication place: United States
- Media type: Print (Hardcover & Paperback)
- Pages: Hardcover: 336; Paperback: 368
- ISBN: 0-345-47733-2
- Preceded by: Star Wars Episode III: Revenge of the Sith
- Followed by: Jedi Twilight

Dark Lord: The Rise of Darth Vader is a novel set in the Star Wars Legends continuity, written by James Luceno, that was published by Del Rey on November 22, 2005. Dark Lord takes place in the immediate aftermath of the events in Star Wars: Episode III – Revenge of the Sith, and focuses on Darth Vader and his rise to power in the newly inaugurated Galactic Empire.

== Plot ==
Dark Lord: The Rise of Darth Vader begins in the final hours of the Clone Wars, just before the implementation of Order 66 as depicted in Revenge of the Sith. When a contingent of clone troopers on the planet Murkhana refuses to open fire on Jedi masters Roan Shryne and Bol Chatak, along with Padawan Olee Starstone, the Jedi with whom it has fought alongside during the war, Emperor Palpatine orders Darth Vader to investigate the matter. Vader's query soon becomes a hunt for the fugitive Jedi, and takes him back to Coruscant, and from there to Alderaan and Kashyyyk. During the course of Vader's search, the whereabouts of several characters from Revenge of the Sith, including Bail Organa, Princess Leia, R2-D2, C-3PO, and Chewbacca are revealed. The beginning of Vader's partnership with Grand Moff Tarkin is also depicted.

Much of Vader's role in the book concerns the internal conflict he undergoes as he tries to shed his former identity as Anakin Skywalker and relearn to master the Force. Palpatine intends for these early missions that he sends Vader on to be as much about learning what it means to be a Sith as they are about consolidating the rule of the nascent Empire.

The final chapters depict the beginning of the Imperial enslavement of the Wookiees of Kashyyyk, featuring Chewbacca.

The epilogue depicts Obi-Wan Kenobi on Tatooine learning that Vader is alive. Fearing for safety of the infant Luke Skywalker, whom he is watching over, Kenobi communes with the spirit of his late master Qui-Gon Jinn, who tells him that Luke will learn his father's identity when the time is right and will even go on to confront him. In addition, Vader will never return to Tatooine, as it represents a past the Sith lord wants to forget forever.

The book establishes that the galaxy's general public believes that Anakin Skywalker perished in the attack on the Jedi Temple (which Skywalker led as Darth Vader).

== Behind the scenes ==
Luceno told the magazine Star Wars Insider about a discussion he had with Ryan Kaufman, formerly of LucasArts, who had worn a Darth Vader costume during the production of a number of LucasArts Star Wars video games. Kaufman's description of what it was like to wear the suit led Luceno to dedicate a substantial amount of the novel toward Vader's struggling with the discomfort of his new prosthetics and armor.

== Reception ==
Publishers Weekly wrote: "What's needed in this intermittently entertaining installment is a better opponent for Vader." Booklist said the novel has a "gripping, fast-paced story".

The novel was 11th on The New York Times Best Seller list, 9th on The Wall Street Journal best seller list, and 7th on Publishers Weekly's best seller list.
