= James Luceno =

American novelist

- Born: April 1, 1947 (age 79); Bermuda
- Occupation: Author
- Writing career
- Language: English
- Genres: Science fiction, western

James Luceno (born April 1, 1947) is an American author known for his novels and reference books connected with the Star Wars franchise and the Star Wars Expanded Universe, and (with Brian Daley under the shared pseudonym Jack McKinney) novelizations of the Robotech animated television series. Luceno is also the author of several original novels along with film novelizations and other franchise tie-ins. He has also written for television cartoon series.

== Star Wars ==
In the Star Wars universe he has written The New Jedi Order novels, Agents of Chaos: Hero's Trial, Agents of Chaos: Jedi Eclipse and The Unifying Force as well as the prequel trilogy novels Darth Maul: Saboteur, Cloak of Deception, Labyrinth of Evil and Dark Lord: The Rise of Darth Vader. He also wrote a novel detailing the history of the Millennium Falcon and Star Wars: Revenge of the Sith: The Visual Dictionary.

In an interview with Star Wars Insider, Luceno said that he would like to write a future novel dealing with the search for immortality that both Qui-Gon Jinn and Darth Plagueis embarked upon in their own separate ways. However, in a talk show interview in February 2007, he indicated that the novel was currently on hold due to Star Wars Expanded Universe continuity concerns. The Darth Plagueis novel again became viable in 2009, and Star Wars: Darth Plagueis was released in January 2012.

Luceno's 2014 novel Star Wars: Tarkin was one of the first four novels published in the franchise after Lucasfilm rebooted the Star Wars Expanded Universe in April 2014. His novel Catalyst: A Rogue One Novel was published in November 2016.

== Other work ==
Luceno wrote 1980's Headhunters, the tale of three Americans' adventure in South America, a place Luceno himself has traveled extensively. He also authored A Fearful Symmetry, Rainchaser, Rock Bottom, and The Big Empty in 1993. Luceno wrote the novelizations of the films The Shadow and The Mask of Zorro. For The Young Indiana Jones Chronicles, Luceno penned 1992's The Mata Hari Affair. He is intermittently working on an autobiography.

He is also the author of the new Web Warrior series and co-author of the popular Robotech novelization series with his close friend Brian Daley. The pair wrote under the pseudonym Jack McKinney. Luceno wrote a tribute to Daley which is posted on Daley's website along with photos of the two of them. Daley and Luceno were also amongst a team of writers for the 1986 television cartoon series The Adventures of the Galaxy Rangers, created by Robert Mandell. Luceno alone also wrote two episodes for the 1995 cartoon series Princess Gwenevere and the Jewel Riders, also by Mandell.

== Bibliography ==
Title	Publisher	Date	ISBN	Notes
Head Hunters	Ballantine Books	September 1980	0-345-28529-8	
A Fearful Symmetry	Del Rey Books	November 1989	0-345-35957-7	
Illegal Alien	Del Rey Books	March 1990	0-345-36254-3	
Kaduna Memories	Del Rey Books	June 1990	0-345-36579-8	as by Jack McKinney
The Mata Hari Affair	Del Rey Books	May 1992	0-345-38009-6	The Young Indiana Jones Chronicles, Book 1
The Big Empty	Del Rey Books	Novelber 1993	0-345-37449-5	
The Shadow	Ivy Books	June 1994	0-8041-1296-7	Film novelization
The Mask of Zorro	Pocket Books	June 1998	0-671-51989-1	Film novelization
Indiana Jones and the Kingdom of the Crystal Skull	Scholastic	May 22, 2008	978-0-545-00701-6	Young adult film novelization
Hunt for the Mayan Looking-Glass	Spectrum	September 18, 2011	978-1-62578-122-2	ISBN provided by Books In Print.

=== Robotech (1987–1996) ===
Novels by Jack McKinney, pseudonymous with James Luceno and Brian Daley, based on the Robotech television series. Published by Del Rey Books.

==== Episode novelizations (1987) ====
Each volume novelizes four to six episodes.

No.	Title	Date	ISBN
1	Genesis	February1987	0-345-34133-3
2	Battle Cry	February1987	0-345-34134-1
3	Homecoming	February1987	0-345-34136-8
4	Battlehymn	February1987	0-345-34137-6
5	Force of Arms	April 1987	0-345-34138-4
6	Doomsday	May 1987	0-345-34139-2
7	Southern Cross	June 1987	0-345-34140-6
8	Metal Fire	July 1987	0-345-34141-4
9	The Final Nightmare	August 1987	0-345-34142-2
10	Invid Invasion	September 1987	0-345-34143-0
11	Metamorphosis	October 1987	0-345-34144-9
12	Symphony of Light	November 1987	0-345-34145-7

==== The Sentinels (1988) ====
Robotech: The Sentinels depicts events originally scripted for the Robotech II: The Sentinels television series. Later printings re-numbered the series as Robotech books 13 through 17.

No.	Title	Date	ISBN
1	The Devil's Hand	March 1988	0-345-35300-5
2	Dark Powers	April 1988	0-345-35301-3
3	Death Dance	May 1988	0-345-35302-1
4	World Killers	June 1988	0-345-35304-8
5	Rubicon	July 1988	0-345-35305-6

==== Original Robotech novels (1989–1996) ====
Novels exploring events after the original television series and The Sentinels animated film.

No.	Title	Date	ISBN
18	The End of the Circle	December 1989	0-345-36311-6
19	The Zentraedi Rebellion	April 1994	0-345-38774-0
20	The Masters' Gambit	May 1995	0-345-38775-9
21	Before the Invid Storm	March 1996	0-345-38776-7

=== Matt Terry series (1988–1990) ===
Westerns featuring the character Matt Terry. Published by Ivy Books.

No.	Title	Date	ISBN
1	Rio Passion	September 1988	0-8041-0263-5
2	Rainchaser	April 1989	0-8041-0264-3
3	Rock Bottom	September 1990	0-8041-0628-2

=== The Black Hole Travel Agency (1991–1994) ===
Satirical scif-fi novels by Jack McKinney, pseudonymous with James Luceno and Brian Daley. Published by Del Rey Books. Originally planned as a shared universe of loosely connected stories lampooning corporate power.

No.	Title	Date	ISBN
1	Event Horizon	May 1991	0-345-37053-8
2	Artiface of the System	August 1991	0-345-37054-6
3	Free Radicals	May 1992	0-345-37078-3
4	Hostile Takeover	January 1994	0-345-37079-1

=== Star Wars (2000–2025) ===
==== The New Jedi Order (2000–2003) ====
Star Wars: The New Jedi Order is a nineteen volume, multi-author series exploring events following Return of the Jedi.

No.	Title	Date	ISBN	Notes
4	Hero's Trial	August 2000	0-345-42860-9	Agents of Chaos, Book I
5	Jedi Eclipse	October 2000	0-345-42859-5	Agents of Chaos, Book II
19	The Unifying Force	November 4, 2003	0-345-42852-8	

==== Original Star Wars novels (2001–2016) ====
Title	Date	ISBN	Notes
Cloak of Deception	May 29, 2001	0-345-44298-9	
Labyrinth of Evil	January 25, 2005	0-345-47572-0	Adapted as the German-language audiodrama Labyrinth des Bösen (2006–07)
Dark Lord: The Rise of Darth Vader	November 22, 2005	0-345-47732-4	
Millennium Falcon	October 21, 2008	978-0-345-50700-6	
Darth Plagueis	January 10, 2012	978-0-345-51128-7	
Tarkin	November 4, 2014	978-0-345-51152-2	Anthologized in Star Wars: The Rise of the Empire (2015)
Catalyst: A Rogue One Novel	November 15, 2016	978-0-345-51149-2	

==== Short fiction (2001–2012) ====
Availability of short fiction is limited, and listed ISBNs are unverified. Later reissues or ebook updates have removed the works.

Work	Collection	Author / Editor	Date	ISBN (unverified)	Notes
"Darth Maul: Saboteur"	Shadow Hunter	Michael Reaves	November 27, 2001	0-345-43541-9	Included in 2001 paperback reissue.
"Restraint"	Shadow Hunter	Michael Reaves	June 28, 2011	978-0-307-79569-4	Included in 2011 ebook edition
"End Game"	The Phantom Menace	Terry Brooks	January 31, 2012	978-0-345-43411-1	Included in 2012 reissue of film novelization.

==== Reference works (2004–2025) ====
Star Wars reference works published by DK.

Title	Date	ISBN	Notes
Inside the Worlds of the Star Wars Trilogy	August 5, 2004	0-7566-0307-2	
Revenge of the Sith: The Visual Dictionary	April 2, 2005	0-7566-1128-8	with Laura Gilbert and J. W. Rinzler
Star Wars: Complete Locations	October 17, 2005	0-7566-1419-8	
Star Wars: The Complete Visual Dictionary	September 25, 2006	0-7566-2238-7	
Star Wars: Complete Locations (revised ed.)	September 27, 2016	978-1-4654-5272-6	
Star Wars: The Complete Visual Dictionary (new ed.)	September 18, 2018	978-1-4654-7547-3	
Star Wars: Complete Locations (new ed.)	March 6, 2025	978-0-593-84421-2	

=== Web Warriors (2002) ===
Web Warriors is an incomplete young adult cyberpunk series attributed to James Luceno. Published by Del Rey Books. The Slavers War, book three, was withdrawn before publication.

No.	Title	Date	ISBN	Alternate titles
1	Memories End	June 25, 2002	0-345-44471-X	Web Warriors, The Real Frontier, Cyberspace Warriors
2	Dimension X	October 29, 2002	0-345-44472-8	Fifth Dimension, Danger in the Fifth Dimension
3	The Slavers War (unverified title)	(unpublished)	0-345-44473-6	Great Cataclysm, Galactic War, Great Slave War

== Filmography ==
Year(s)	Title	Writer	Notes
1986	The Adventures of the Galaxy Rangers	Yes	6 episodes
1995–1996	Princess Gwenevere and the Jewel Riders	Yes	2 episodes
2025	Crafting an Epic: The Making of the New Jedi Order	No	Audio documentary; 9 episodes
