= Caitlin Greer =

American actress

- Occupation: Actress
- Years active: 1999–present

Caitlin Greer (born 20th century) is an American actress and voice-over artist. Her voice was used in Rockstar Games' Bully as Beatrice Trudeau. She is the narrator of The New York Times-bestselling Hush, Hush novel by Becca Fitzpatrick. She has narrated many other books, but Hush, Hush, is her most known work.

== Television ==
She has appeared in American Dreams, Saturday Night Live, Trackers, and on MTV.

== Video games ==
Greer voiced and provided the motion capture performance for the character Beatrice Trudeau in Rockstar Games' Bully (2006).

She voiced characters for other video games including Sword of the New World: Granado Espada (2007) and Grand Theft Auto IV (2008).

Greer is an IGN award-winner and two-time nominee for Best Voice Acting: Game Ensemble (2008).

== List of her narrated books ==
- Becca Fitzpatrick's Fallen Angels Series: Hush, Hush, Crescendo, Silence, and Finale
- Gabrielle Zevin's Memoirs of a Teenage Amnesiac
- Judy Blundell's What I Saw, and How I Lied
- Nina Malkin's Swoon
- E. Lockhart's Fly on the Wall: How One Girl Saw Everything
- Dana Reinhardt's How to Build a House
- Rachel Cohn's The Steps
- Philippa Ballantine's The Shifted World Series: Hunter and Fox and Kindred and Wings
- Karen Lynch's Relentless Series: "Relentless," "Rogue," "Refuge," and "Haven"
- James Patterson and Duane Swierczynski's "The Shut In"
