= Qui-Gon Jinn =

Fictional character in the Star Wars universe

- Star Wars character
- Liam Neeson as Qui-Gon Jinn in The Phantom Menace (1999)
- First appearance: The Phantom Menace (1999)
- Created by: George Lucas
- Portrayed by: Liam Neeson (Note: The Phantom Menace Obi-Wan Kenobi)
- Voiced by: Liam Neeson (Note: The Rise of Skywalker Attack of the Clones The Clone Wars (series) Tales of the Jedi Rebels (archival audio)); Tom Kane (Note: Lego Star Wars: The Yoda Chronicles Lego Star Wars: Droid Tales The Lego Star Wars Holiday Special Lego Star Wars: The Skywalker Saga); Micheál Richardson (Note: Tales of the Jedi); Fred Tatasciore (Note: Clone Wars); James Warwick (Note: The Phantom Menace (video game) Jedi Power Battles Star Wars: Obi-Wan Galactic Battlegrounds)

In-universe information
- Occupation: Jedi Master
- Affiliation: Jedi Order; Galactic Republic
- Master: Count Dooku
- Apprentices: Obi-Wan Kenobi; Others in Legends (Note: Qui-Gon's apprentice in the Star Wars Legends narrative universe is Xanatos.)

Qui-Gon Jinn (/ˈkwaɪɡɒn/) is a fictional character in the Star Wars franchise. He was introduced as a Jedi Master in the prequel film The Phantom Menace (1999), and is portrayed by Liam Neeson. He appears in the series Tales of the Jedi, and is featured as a Force spirit in the animated series The Clone Wars (2008) and the live-action miniseries Obi-Wan Kenobi (2022). Qui-Gon also appears in novels, comics and video games.

In The Phantom Menace, Qui-Gon and his apprentice Obi-Wan Kenobi are tasked with protecting Padmé Amidala, the queen of Naboo. On the planet Tatooine, they encounter a young slave named Anakin Skywalker, whom Qui-Gon believes is the "Chosen One" destined to bring balance to the Force. When Qui-Gon is fatally wounded in a lightsaber duel against Darth Maul, he asks Obi-Wan to train Anakin. The 2005 film Revenge of the Sith reveals that Qui-Gon learned how to become a Force spirit after death, an ability which he later taught to Obi-Wan and Yoda.

== Creation ==
George Lucas created the Star Wars franchise, and wrote and directed The Phantom Menace. He created the character Qui-Gon Jinn for the film. Although Qui-Gon is the master of Obi-Wan Kenobi and is older than him, Lucas had considered making Qui-Gon the younger Jedi. Lucas described the character as independent and "always testing the rules". He said Qui-Gon refuses to "go along with the program".

Lucas originally envisioned an American actor in the role of Qui-Gon, but ultimately cast the Northern Irish actor Liam Neeson. He described Neeson as a "master actor, who the other actors will look up to, who has got the qualities of strength that the character demands". Neeson described Qui-Gon as wise, confident, philosophical and very skilled in martial arts. He said the Jedi Master has "a magical quality that enables him to see into the future. He's not really a rebel, but he has his own code."

Qui-Gon Jinn's name is derived from the Chinese word qigong (simplified Chinese: 气功; traditional Chinese: 氣功), and the Arabic word jinn (جِنّ). Qigong is a system of breathing and exercise designed to support physical and mental health, while a jinn is a type of spirit found in Arabian mythology. "Qui-Gon Jinn" can be translated as "Guardian Spirit of the Living Force." "Jinn" also resembles the Chinese word for power, jin (勁), and the martial arts concept fa jin, which is the explosive release of internal strength or power.

== Appearances ==
=== Prequel trilogy ===
Qui-Gon is introduced in the first film of the prequel trilogy, The Phantom Menace (1999). He is portrayed by Liam Neeson. Qui-Gon and his Jedi apprentice Obi-Wan Kenobi are sent to Naboo to resolve a conflict involving the Trade Federation, a business conglomerate that has blockaded the planet for political leverage. When the two Jedi arrive, the Federation attempts to assassinate them. Qui-Gon and Obi-Wan retreat to Naboo, rescue its besieged queen, Padmé Amidala, then leave for Coruscant, the galactic capital. During the journey, they land on Tatooine to repair their ship. Qui-Gon encounters a nine-year-old slave boy named Anakin Skywalker, whose potential with the Force is the highest ever detected. The Jedi Master becomes intrigued when Anakin's mother tells him that the boy had no father. Believing that Anakin could be the "Chosen One" of Jedi prophecy destined to bring balance to the Force, Qui-Gon secures the boy's freedom and decides to bring him before the Jedi Council on Coruscant. Before leaving Tatooine, Qui-Gon duels with a mysterious warrior dressed in black.

On Coruscant, Qui-Gon asks the Council to allow Anakin to be trained as a Jedi. Master Yoda senses fear in the boy, and the Council denies the request. Undaunted, Qui-Gon vows that he will train Anakin himself. Padmé, Qui-Gon and Obi-Wan return to Naboo, where they once again encounter the dark warrior, who reveals himself to be the Sith Lord Darth Maul. During a ferocious lightsaber battle, Maul fatally wounds Qui-Gon. After defeating Maul, Obi-Wan promises to train Anakin for Qui-Gon before he dies.

In the second film, Attack of the Clones (2002), Neeson provides the voice of Qui-Gon. When Anakin is slaughtering the Tusken Raiders on Tatooine, the Jedi Master's voice can be heard. Near the end of the third film, Revenge of the Sith (2005), Yoda reveals to Obi-Wan that he has been communicating with the spirit of Qui-Gon.

=== The Rise of Skywalker ===
Neeson provides the voice of Qui-Gon in The Rise of Skywalker (2019). After Rey collapses during her confrontation with the somehow resurrected Darth Sidious, she hears the voices of various deceased Jedi, including Qui-Gon. The Jedi give her the strength to continue the battle.

=== Television ===
Qui-Gon is voiced by Neeson in the animated series The Clone Wars (2008–2014; 2020). In season three, he informs Obi-Wan and Anakin about three beings who share his belief that Anakin is the Chosen One. These beings are known as the Father (the unifying Force manifestation), the Daughter (the light side incarnation) and the Son (the dark side embodiment). In the sixth season of the series, Qui-Gon's disembodied voice instructs Yoda to learn the secret of Force immortality.

Qui-Gon returns in the 2022 miniseries Tales of the Jedi. An older version of the character is voiced by Liam Neeson, while a younger version is voiced by Neeson's son, Micheál Richardson. In the second episode, the young Qui-Gon serves as Padawan to Count Dooku, and helps to investigate a mysterious kidnapping on an impoverished planet. When Qui-Gon stops Dooku from losing his temper and killing a corrupt senator, Dooku commends him for his wisdom. In the fourth episode of the series, Jedi Master Qui-Gon and Dooku discuss the Jedi Council's refusal to believe that Darth Maul is a Sith Lord. After Qui-Gon's death, a grieving Dooku remembers how, as a boy, Qui-Gon was fascinated with the tree in the Jedi Temple.

Throughout the 2022 miniseries Obi-Wan Kenobi, Kenobi tries unsuccessfully to reach out to Qui-Gon's Force spirit. In the final episode, Qui-Gon, played by Neeson, finally appears to Obi-Wan.

=== Novels ===
The 2019 novel Master and Apprentice features Qui-Gon and Obi-Wan.

== Star Wars Legends ==
Following the acquisition of Lucasfilm by The Walt Disney Company in 2012, most of the licensed Star Wars novels and comics produced between 1977 and 2014 were rebranded as Star Wars Legends and declared non-canon to the franchise. The Legends works comprise a separate narrative universe. (Note: Attributed to multiple references:)

=== Novels ===
Qui-Gon's life prior to The Phantom Menace is detailed in the Jedi Apprentice series. In The Rising Force, Yoda encourages the Jedi Knight to take a new Padawan learner. Qui-Gon's previous apprentice, Xanatos, had turned to the dark side of the Force. Qui-Gon observes a lightsaber tournament among a group of the Temple's older students, which includes the twelve-year-old Obi-Wan. He takes note of Obi-Wan's skills, but refuses to train him due to his uncontrolled anger. On a mission to Bandomeer, Qui-Gon again encounters Obi-Wan, who is being sent to the planet to begin life as an agricultural laborer. During the journey, Qui-Gon and Obi-Wan defend a group of Arcona from the criminal organization Offworld Corporation. When they arrive on Bandomeer, Qui-Gon receives a letter from Xanatos.

In The Dark Rival, it is revealed that Xanatos is now the leader of Offworld. Qui-Gon meets his former apprentice to negotiate an agreement between Offworld and Bandomeer, but ends up dueling with Xanatos instead. Qui-Gon and Obi-Wan end Offworld's business on Bandomeer, but Xanatos escapes. During the encounter with Xanatos, Qui-Gon realizes Obi-Wan's potential and accepts him as his Padawan. In The Captive Temple, Xanatos nearly assassinates Yoda, but Qui-Gon and Obi-Wan thwart his plans. When they chase Xanatos back to his homeworld in The Day of Reckoning, the fallen Jedi refuses to surrender and commits suicide.

In Legacy of the Jedi, an apprentice Qui-Gon accompanies his master Dooku on a diplomatic assignment. Their ship is infiltrated by space pirates led by the rogue Jedi Lorian Nod, a former friend of Dooku's. The two battle and Dooku is overcome by anger, but Qui-Gon prevents his master from violating the Jedi Code by committing cold-blooded murder. Years later, Qui-Gon and Obi-Wan encounter Nod again and imprison him for his crimes. In Secrets of the Jedi, Qui-Gon and Obi-Wan embark on a mission with the Jedi Master Adi Gallia and her Padawan Siri Tachi. Qui-Gon and Adi become separated from Obi-Wan and Siri, which leads to the discovery of romantic feelings between the two apprentices. Sensing these feelings in Obi-Wan, Qui-Gon shares the story of his relationship with Tahl, a female Jedi whose murder nearly pushed Qui-Gon to the dark side.

Cloak of Deception is set a year before The Phantom Menace. Qui-Gon and Obi-Wan fight a terrorist organization called the Nebula Front, which is secretly following the orders of Darth Sidious. At the Trade Federation conference on Eriadu, the two Jedi successfully defend Chancellor Valorum but cannot prevent the Neimoidian takeover of the Federation.

=== Comics ===
In the comic series Star Wars: Republic, Qui-Gon and other Jedi fight in the Stark Hyperspace War. Qui-Gon saves the life of Nute Gunray, the future Trade Federation viceroy.

== Other appearances ==
Qui-Gon appears in the video games Star Wars Episode I: The Phantom Menace, Star Wars: Jedi Power Battles, Star Wars: Obi-Wan, Star Wars Episode I: Racer, multiple Lego Star Wars games, and Star Wars: The Force Unleashed via downloadable content. A bird version of Qui-Gon, called "Quail-Gon", is playable in Angry Birds Star Wars II.

== Reception ==
In his review of The Phantom Menace, Colin Kennedy of Empire said that Neeson "manfully carrie[s] the action on his shoulders" throughout the film. He felt that Qui-Gon's final words to Obi-Wan—"Promise me you will train the boy"—provide the film with its only emotional weight. Owen Gleiberman of Entertainment Weekly wrote that Neeson "holds The Phantom Menace together". He said that Qui-Gon is "commanding", and gives the film "its only hints of emotional dynamism". For his portrayal of Qui-Gon, Neeson was nominated for the 2000 Saturn Award for Best Actor.

== See also ==
- Star Wars books
- Star Wars comics
- Star Wars video games
