= Jedi Quest =

Series of novels by Jude Watson

- Cover of the series' introductory novel, Path to Truth
- Author: Jude Watson
- Country: United States
- Language: English
- Genre: Science fiction, Star Wars
- Publisher: Scholastic
- Published: 2001 – 2004
- Media type: Print
- No. of books: 11

Jedi Quest is an eleven-book young reader series written by Jude Watson about Obi-Wan Kenobi and his apprentice Anakin Skywalker. It is set in the fictional Star Wars universe between Episode I: The Phantom Menace and Episode II: Attack of the Clones (32–22 BBY). The series was published by Scholastic from 2001 to 2004.

== Publication history ==
Jude Watson wrote the eleven book Jedi Quest series: Path to Truth was published in 2001; The Way of the Apprentice, The Trail of the Jedi, The Dangerous Games, and The Master of Disguise were published in 2002; The Moment of Truth, The School of Fear, and The Shadow Trap were published in 2003; The Changing of the Guard, The False Peace, and The Final Showdown were published in 2004. The introductory novel, Path to Truth, is unnumbered, meaning the last ten books of the eleven-book series are numbered 1–10. Pablo Hidalgo, in the Star Wars: The Essential Reader's Companion, explained that "in 2000, the publishing and product development teams at Lucas Licensing first planned the Jedi Quest banner to encompass books, comics, toys and roleplaying games". Hidalgo noted that while the full extent of this "multimedia project" did not come together, "the Scholastic young reader series proved popular enough to carry on without any ancillary product support". The series was also intended to provide "glimpses of Episode II, but only Path to Truth arrived in advance of the 2002 Episode II tie-in titles".

Writer Ryder Windham and artist Pop Mhan created the four-issue comic book adaptation of Path to Truth; titled Jedi Quest, it was published by Dark Horse Comics in 2001. This is collected in Star Wars Omnibus: Menace Revealed (2009).

== Summaries ==
=== Path to Truth ===
Anakin has undergone over three years of preparatory training since the events of The Phantom Menace. Path to Truth begins with Anakin Skywalker and Obi-Wan Kenobi climbing atop of a cliff. Anakin has to find his crystals for his lightsaber. After he completes this task, Skywalker and Kenobi are summoned to complete a mission which leads to the return of friends and old enemies.

=== The Way of the Apprentice ===
In The Way of the Apprentice, four Master-Padawan teams (Anakin and Obi-Wan, Darra Thel-Tanis and Soara Antana, Tru Veld and Ry-Gaul, Ferus Olin and Siri Tachi) must travel to Radnor, where several cities are carrying a deadly virus, and sort out the problem. The mission forces the Masters and Padawans to split into two separate groups, enduring dangers within different sectors of Radnor. Anakin forms a tense rivalry with Ferus Olin and a friendship in Tru Veld. The Jedi uncover a conspiracy and a threat of an invasion. The mission results in bitter-sweet success.

=== The Trail of the Jedi ===
In The Trail of the Jedi, Obi-Wan organizes a training exercise for Anakin and himself. They adventure to the beautiful planet of Ragoon 6 only to find that a team of bounty hunters have been hired to capture them by a mysterious man, named Granta Omega, who wants them dead.

=== The Dangerous Games ===
In The Dangerous Games, Obi-Wan and Anakin are sent to the planet Euceron to guard the Galactic Games, along with Master-Padawan teams Siri Tachi & Ferus Olin, and Ry-Gaul & Tru Veld. They learn of a plot involving an illegal podrace that has been fixed to go wrong. Anakin must enter the race and face his old rival Sebulba's son.

=== The Master of Disguise ===
In The Master of Disguise, Anakin and Obi-Wan, along with Soara Antana and Darra Thel-Tanis, find themselves caught on a hostile planet attempting to save a group of scientists trapped within its war-torn environment. The rescue is a success, but Anakin errors which results in Darra being severely injured and losing her lightsaber. Obi-Wan discovers that Granta Omega, an old enemy that has marked himself and Anakin for death, is behind the attacks against the Jedi. As Soara takes on the excruciating task of training and refining Anakin's skills with a lightsaber, as well as his own self-perception, Obi-Wan investigates the master of disguise. Granta Omega's origins are revealed, and his intentions will send him waging a one man war against the Jedi Order.

=== The School of Fear ===
In The School of Fear, the son of a Senator has gone missing. Anakin and Ferus must infiltrate an elite school in order to find out what has happened, while Obi-Wan and Siri monitor from afar. Anakin joins a secret squad and finds out that Ferus has gone missing, but does not reveal so to the Masters, his prideful intentions aiming to complete the mission alone. He finds that the secret squad was formed by the senator's son who is plotting to use Anakin's dead body to cause a scandal. The result of this mission puts Anakin and Obi-Wan further apart than ever.

=== The Shadow Trap ===
In The Shadow Trap, when the Jedi are called in to help pacify a chaotic planet, it should be a routine mission. But behind the chaos is Granta Omega in hiding. The routine mission goes horribly wrong and, in a moment that will be shocking to fans, the Jedi Master Yaddle is killed ... with Anakin feeling responsible. It takes the combined power of Yoda, Anakin, and Obi-Wan to fight this battle and overcome the machinations of Granta Omega.

=== The Moment of Truth ===
In The Moment of Truth, Masters and apprentices must trust one another, but that is not the case with Anakin and Obi-Wan. A rift is building between them and an old enemy from Obi-Wan's past, the insane galactic scientist Jenna Zan Arbor, seeks to release an experimental drug onto an unsuspecting populace. When the duo are separated during a rescue mission on a dangerous planet, their conflict reaches a new high—and shows signs of things to come.

=== The Changing of the Guard ===
In The Changing of the Guard, Obi-Wan, Anakin, Siri, and Ferus must try to capture the mad scientist Jenna Zan Arbor from a planet run by criminals as a refuge for other criminals. To do this, they have to go undercover, disguised as the kind of scum they usually try to catch. Will the means be worth the ends? Or will Anakin learn too much about the lawless side of the galaxy?

=== The False Peace ===
In The False Peace, Granta Omega and his ally Jenna Zan Arbor are destroying planets, framing the Jedi as responsible. Obi-Wan must find a way to clear the Order's name and find Omega before it is too late. Anakin grows in his relationship with Chancellor Palpatine, and Omega's plans threaten the safety of the Senate.

=== The Final Showdown ===
In The Final Showdown, Granta Omega has been found. Anakin and Ferus's rivalry reaches a boiling point when Anakin discovers that Ferus has been chosen over him to test out a "Knight Acceleration" program. On a mission to finally capture Omega on the ancient Sith homeworld of Korriban, Anakin and Ferus turn the mission into a contest. Unfortunately, their rivalry causes a fellow Padawan to pay the price for their actions. Granta Omega, revealed to be the son of the Dark Jedi Xanatos (the late Qui-Gon Jinn's old apprentice before Obi-Wan), stages his endgame. Obi-Wan, Anakin, Siri, Ferus, Ry-Gaul, Tru, Soara, and Darra must endure the harsh nature of the Dark Side, broken friendships, death, Omega's cunning, and the hidden influence of the Sith.

== Reception ==
Three of the books in the series were on The New York Times Best Seller list: Jedi Quest: Path to Truth was #9 in "Children's Chapter Books" in September 2001, Jedi Quest: The Way of the Apprentice was #9 in "Children's Paperback Books" in June 2002, and Jedi Quest: The Dangerous Games was #10 in "Children's Paperback Books" in August 2002.

Harry Thomas of the San Antonio Express-News commented that Jedi Quest: Path To Truth "is mainly aimed at the 9-12 set", however, "older readers interested in the Star Wars universe will find this book interesting, if a little slower than the more adult-oriented novels". Thomas highlighted that story focuses on Anakin's struggle with anger – during a search for lightsaber crystals on Ilum, "Anakin relives a dark day in his past" when he encountered the slave raider Krayn which "fills him with anger"; later a pirate attack investigation leads to Anakin encountering Krayn again and Anakin "begins what will be his journey down the dark path when he decides to seek revenge". Joseph Szadkowski of The Washington Times rhetorically asked "why should I (the consumer) care" about the Jedi Quest comic adaptation before explaining that the "four-issue miniseries provides a graphic companion to the Jude Watson's Bantam Star Wars novel of the same name" and "readers will get the background on a 12-year-old Anakin Skywalker as he learns the Jedi craft, battles space pirates such as Krayn the ugly, builds his lightsaber and develops a personality only the Dark Lords of the Sith would admire". He highlighted that Anakin as a "Jedi-in-training" goes on a mission where he must "confront his deepest, darkest fears – first on a spiritual training exercise, and eventually face-to-face with the memories that haunt him most. The force permeates through 32 pages of Kenobi-inspired color". In 2025, Jenna Wrenn of Screen Rant argued that the comic adaptation by Ryder Windham would be "an easy piece of media to adapt to live-action without having to rewrite the narrative" even though it is now part of the Legends continuity and a "live-action adaptation would perfectly build on the events directly following The Phantom Menace, showing the growing pains that both Anakin and Obi-Wan go through". Wrenn highlighted that "Jedi Quest captures the complexities of Anakin's youth as he navigates the challenges of Jedi training while also showing the developing dynamic of Anakin and Obi-Wan's relationship". Wrenn commented that the series shows "just how much Anakin struggled with adhering to the Jedi Code, even as a child", along with Palpatine's early Anakin-releated machinations.

Deborah Mervold, in a review of The Way of the Apprentice for CM: Canadian Review of Materials, stated "the plot is believable and interesting", noting that "the intended age group and particularly science fiction and Star Wars fans would enjoy this book". Mervold highlighted that the characters learn from working together and Anakin, the point of view character in this third-person narrative, "is multi-dimensional and learns a lesson about leadership". Mervold also thought Obi-Wan was a "believable" character and the two had a "credible" relationship, however, "the other Padawans tended to be more one-dimensional as we learn very little about them, other than their reactions on the mission". Steve Daly, in an overview of Star Wars: Episode II – Attack of the Clones (2002) releated books for Entertainment Weekly, commented that "in the Bantha-poodoo class are shovelware titles aimed at kids, from Scholastic – dreck like Boba Fett: The Fight to Survive ($9.95) and Jedi Quest: The Trail of the Jedi ($4.99)".

== See also ==
- List of Star Wars books
