= Karen Lynch =

Karen Lynch may refer to:

- Karen S. Lynch (born 1963), president and chief executive officer of CVS Health
- Karen Lynch (author) (born 1967), author of young adult urban fantasy novels
