= Star Wars: Episode I – The Phantom Menace (video game) =

1999 video game

- Developer: Big Ape Productions
- Publisher: LucasArts
- Series: Star Wars
- Platforms: Windows, PlayStation
- Release: Windows: NA: May 18, 1999; EU: June 4, 1999; PlayStation: NA: September 14, 1999; PAL: September 24, 1999
- Genre: Action-adventure
- Mode: Single-player

Star Wars: Episode I – The Phantom Menace is a 1999 action-adventure video game developed by Big Ape Productions and published by LucasArts for Windows and the PlayStation. An adaptation of the film of the same title, players take on the role of Qui-Gon Jinn, Obi-Wan Kenobi and several other characters in a near-identical retelling of the film. Each playable character has a unique weapon and ability.

The game was a commercial success, selling over 337,866 copies of the Windows version alone by 2000. The game received mixed reviews, with praise for the gameplay, graphics and story and criticism for the camera angles and voice acting. The PlayStation version was re-released on the PlayStation 4 and PlayStation 5 as part of the PlayStation Plus Classics catalogue on January 16, 2024.

== Gameplay ==
The Phantom Menace is played largely from a top-down view. The game follows the plot of the film, but expands and alters points.

The player is able to control either Obi-Wan Kenobi, Qui-Gon Jinn, Queen Amidala or Captain Panaka, depending on the level. If the player is playing as either of the two Jedi, they can use a lightsaber or execute a Force push in addition to using blasters, proton missile launchers and explosives (which are available for Amidala and Panaka). The player may also encounter and interact with other non-player characters for directions, advice, trade, side missions (such as rescuing a captive or stopping a mugging) or to access otherwise locked areas. A degree of freedom was also granted to the player, even allowing them to kill innocent NPCs. Throughout the game, the player fights against Darth Maul, Trade Federation battle droids, AATs, Tusken Raiders, Jawas, and various alien thugs and droids. The game was among the first 3D Star Wars games to feature lightsaber duels as a combat feature.

== Plot ==
The plot closely follows that of the film, although it expands on some minor events that were not present in the original film, or shows them from a different character's point of view. For example, it follows Queen Amidala (Grey DeLisle) and Captain Panaka's (Jeff Coopwood) journey on Coruscant during Anakin Skywalker's (Jake Lloyd) interview in the Jedi Temple—something that is never shown or mentioned in the film since the film follows Anakin's point of view. It mainly surrounds Jedi Master Qui-Gon Jinn (James Warwick) and his apprentice, Obi-Wan Kenobi (Scott Cleverdon). The story features several boss fights, such as a Tusken Raider Chieftain, Jabba's Pit Beast, and Sith Lord Darth Maul (Gregg Berger).

The Trade Federation, led by Viceroy Nute Gunray, has established a blockade of the planet Naboo amid an intergalactic trade dispute. Hoping to resolve the conflict peacefully, the Chancellor of the Galactic Republic, Finis Valorum, sends two Jedi, master Qui-Gon Jinn and his padawan, Obi-Wan Kenobi, to negotiate with the Viceroy. However, after they arrive on Gunray's ship, the meeting room begins to fill with poisonous gas. Realizing that Gunray plans to assassinate them, the Jedi escape the room and fight their way through the ship, battling the Trade Federation's army of battle droids. They reach the hangar bay and escape in separate ships to the swamps of Naboo.

There, Obi-Wan meets with Jar Jar Binks, an exile of the Gungan city Otoh Gunga, who reunites him with Qui-Gon. Upon travelling to Otoh Gunga, Jar-Jar is imprisoned, leaving Obi-Wan to navigate through the city to rescue him. At the same time, Qui-Gon attempts to negotiate for his release with the Gungan leader Boss Nass. Qui-Gon manages to convince Nass to spare Jar-Jar's life, and they depart for Naboo's capital, Theed, where Obi-Wan is again separated from Qui-Gon and Jar-Jar, forcing him to navigate his way through the Gardens of Theed. Upon doing so, he finds Qui-Gon and Jar-Jar with Queen Amidala and her entourage. He is then required to safely escort the group through the city as an invasion commences. Along with Captain Panaka, they flee the besieged capital and make an emergency landing on the desert planet of Tatooine.

Qui-Gon scours the market of Mos Espa for the vital ship parts needed to escape the planet and encounters child slave Anakin Skywalker, who helps him find the parts in return for help finding components to fix his racer. Following a deal struck with crime lord Jabba the Hutt, in which he had to kill one of Jabba's beasts in exchange for a sum of money, Qui-Gon uses it to make a bet with Anakin's master Watto and wins his freedom.

As Qui-Gon escorts Anakin back to the ship, he is attacked by a mysterious Sith warrior, Darth Maul, who was seen earlier watching Qui-Gon before the pod race in which Anakin's freedom is won. Qui-Gon fights him off and escapes with Anakin. The group returns to Coruscant so that the Queen can meet with her ally Senator Palpatine and plead Naboo's case to the Chancellor and the Senate. After Panaka escorts her through the dangerous underbelly of Coruscant (foiling several attempts by bounty hunters to capture her in the process), she decides to return to Naboo and retake Theed. At the same time, Palpatine arranges for the Chancellor to be removed from office when he proves unable to handle the crisis.

During the attack, Darth Maul reappears. Qui-Gon and Obi-Wan duel Maul, pursuing him into the generator complex, while the Queen and Panaka invade the throne room and defeat Gunray. Obi-Wan becomes separated from Qui-Gon and Maul, allowing the Sith to impale Qui-Gon. Obi-Wan then attacks him and finally defeats him, killing him atop a scaffold above a pit (in the film, in which Kenobi cuts Maul in half). Qui-Gon makes Obi-Wan promise to train Anakin as a Jedi before he dies of his wounds. Like the film, the game ends with the celebration on Naboo.

== Reception ==
Reception

Aggregate score
Aggregator	Score	
Aggregator	PC	PS
GameRankings	62%	54%

Review scores
Publication	Score	
Publication	PC	PS
Adventure Gamers	2/5	N/A
CNET Gamecenter	8/10	6/10
Computer Games Strategy Plus	1.5/5	N/A
Computer Gaming World	1.5/5	N/A
Electronic Gaming Monthly	N/A	5.625/10 (Note: In Electronic Gaming Monthly's review of the PlayStation version, one critic gave it 6/10, and the rest gave it each a score of 5.5/10.)
Game Informer	8.25/10	7.25/10
GameFan	N/A	61% (Note: Three critics of GameFan gave the PlayStation version each a score of 60, 68, and 55.)
GameRevolution	B−	N/A
GameSpot	4.3/10	4.2/10
IGN	6.2/10	6.2/10
Next Generation	3/5	1/5
Official U.S. PlayStation Magazine	N/A	3/5
PC Accelerator	5/10	N/A
PC Gamer (US)	71%	N/A

Star Wars Episode I: The Phantom Menace received mixed reviews on both platforms according to the review aggregation website GameRankings. Frank O'Connor of NextGen's September 1999 issue called the PC version "A decent challenge, decently made. Just don't expect Jedi Knight." Two issues later, however, Blake Fisher called the PlayStation version "the path to the Dark Side."

Christopher Michael Baker of AllGame gave the PC version three stars out of five, saying, "Though the game's faults abound, I couldn't begin to count the number of times I exclaimed, 'This is SO cool!' That has to make up for some of them, but nothing can dispel at least some disappointment. What it all comes down to is that the Force is with The Phantom Menace -- but only as much as it is with the Jedi in the game." However, Jonathan Sutyak gave the PlayStation version two-and-a-half stars out of five, saying that it "does not include anything original and will become repetitive to many gamers due to the lack of enemy diversity (most of the enemies are Battle Droids, true to the movie). By not adding anything new to the action/adventure genre and with all of its very straightforward puzzles, the only people this game will appeal to are fans of the film." Edge gave the former five out of ten, saying, "After the sophistication of Jedi Knight and X-Wing Alliance, both of which demonstrated just how well the 'Star Wars' universe can be translated to the PC, it's impossible not to be disappointed with The Phantom Menace. A golden opportunity, tragically missed."

Lawrence Neves of GamePro said that the PC version "progresses much like the movie. It starts off with a bang, gets a little dreary in the middle, and really picks up again at the end. The tedious hacking, slashing, switch-triggering, and NPC escorting may seem like the wait for the Phantom Menace movie tickets: a whole lotta time for a two-hour payoff." (Note: GamePro gave the PC version 4/5 each for graphics, sound, control, and fun factor.) However, Scary Larry said that the PlayStation version "leaves you exactly where the movie did. It has its moments of excitement and its spots of drudgery, and in the end you wished they'd put more [Darth] Maul in the game. But you'll never once say you didn't enjoy it, and that's all that matters." (Note: GamePro gave the PlayStation version two 4/5 scores for graphics and control, and two 4.5/5 scores for sound and fun factor.)

The PC version sold 337,866 units in the U.S. by November 2000, according to PC Data. The PlayStation version was a bestseller in the UK. It also received a "Gold" sales award from the Entertainment and Leisure Software Publishers Association (ELSPA), indicating sales of at least 200,000 units in the UK.
