= The Rising Force =

1999 novel by Dave Wolverton

- Author: Dave Wolverton
- Cover artist: Cliff Nielsen
- Language: English
- Series: Jedi Apprentice; Canon C
- Genre: Science fiction
- Publisher: Scholastic
- Publication date: May 3, 1999
- Publication place: United States
- Media type: Paperback
- Pages: 171
- ISBN: 0-590-51922-0
- Preceded by: Darth Bane: Dynasty of Evil
- Followed by: The Dark Rival

The Rising Force by Dave Wolverton is the first in a series of young reader novels called Jedi Apprentice. The only novel of the series to be written by Dave Wolverton, it was released on May 3, 1999. The series explores the adventures of Qui-Gon Jinn and Obi-Wan Kenobi prior to Star Wars: Episode I – The Phantom Menace.

== Plot ==
The protagonist, Obi-Wan Kenobi is trying hard to become an apprentice within four weeks. At the end of those four weeks is his thirteenth birthday, and by then he would have passed the cut-off age for apprenticeship, and be forced to leave the Jedi Temple. Master Yoda informs Obi-Wan that Qui-Gon Jinn is going to be visiting the Jedi Temple in search of an apprentice. As there are no other Jedi looking for an apprentice at the time, Qui-Gon is Obi-Wan's only hope.

Obi-Wan fails to become Qui-Gon's apprentice and is subsequently assigned to the Jedi Agricultural Corps on the planet Bandomeer. He finds out Qui-Gon is on a mission on Bandomeer, also. The two must dodge Whiphids and Hutts on a mining ship, which is eventually hijacked by Offworld Corporation, a rival faction to the group Obi-Wan is joining. Offworld holds the ship's stash of dactyl, a mineral required for most of the creatures on the ship.

The mining ship is soon attacked by pirates, which causes them to launch an emergency landing on a moon close to Bandomeer. The Jedi, Offworld, and Offworld's rival faction must work together to fight against predators and other threats. Offworld's uprising is also stopped during this truce, and once the ship is repaired, the factions travel together to Bandomeer.

Qui-Gon catches glimpses of Obi-Wan's potential, and starts to reconsider.

== Reception ==
Don D'Ammassa of the Science Fiction Chronicle described the book along with The Dark Rival as "[l]ight but fun". Isaac Romaker praised the book in a review in The Hamilton Spectator for its characterization and "good conflict".
