= What I Saw and How I Lied =

2008 novel by Judy Blundell

- First edition
- Author: Judy Blundell
- Language: English
- Genre: Historical novel
- Published: November, 2008 (Scholastic, Inc.)
- Publication place: United States
- Media type: Print
- Pages: 281 pp
- ISBN: 0-439-90346-7

What I Saw and How I Lied is a novel for young adults written by Judy Blundell and published by Scholastic in 2008. It won the annual U.S. National Book Award for Young People's Literature.

What I Saw and How I Lied is historical fiction set in the United States after World War II. Scholastic recommends it for age 13+. The audiobook edition, narrated by Caitlin Greer, appeared on the Young Adult Library Services Association Amazing Audiobooks for Young Adults list in 2011.

== Plot ==
What I Saw and How I Lied takes place right after WWII and follows the story of Evie Spooner and her family. A few weeks before fifteen-year-old Evie is supposed to head back to her school, Evie’s stepfather, Joe, who recently got back from the war, uproots Evie, and her mother, Beverly, from their home in Queens, New York to take them on a vacation to Palm Beach, Florida.

After a long, hot car trip Evie and her family finally makes it to Palm Beach, to find that it is the off-season and only one hotel is open. After checking in and getting settled they soon make the acquaintance of the Graysons.

Mr. and Mrs. Grayson are a married couple from New York City. They travel to Palm Beach for a vacation, where they meet Evie’s family. During their stay, the two families become acquainted and develop a friendship.

One night, Evie finds out that a school dance is being held at the hotel and she decides to join in. While getting ready her mother and Mrs. Grayson catch her padding her bra, and Mrs. Grayson takes her under her wing. With the help of her mother and Mrs. Grayson, Evie gets ready for the dance.

At the dance Evie gets frustrated and goes outside where she meets Peter Coleridge. Peter is older, handsome, and asks her to dance. As it turns out Peter and Evie’s father has known each other in the war. Peter soon becomes a part of Evie’s life, and her family’s life. He joins them for dinner on a regular basis and begins to take Evie and her mother for daily drives.

As Evie’s relationship is progressing with Peter so is her father’s relationship with Mr. Grayson. Joe and Mr. Grayson decide to go into business together by buying the hotel where they are staying. However, the current hotel manager finds out that the Graysons are Jewish and asks them to leave.

Looking for clarity and comfort, Evie goes to Peter to understand what happened to the Graysons. Peter informs her that Palm Beach is a restricted community. As Peter and Evie continue their conversation Peter tells her that his connection to her father is stronger than friendship- in fact, they had stolen property that most likely belonged to Jewish families. Joe had promised to split the money with Peter but has been giving him the slip since they came back from the war. Peter followed Evie’s family to Palm Beach in an effort to confront Joe. Evie comforts Peter and the two end up kissing. Evie’s mom, Beverly, catches the two of them and Evie is told never to see Peter again.

The next morning Joe, Beverly, and Peter go out for a boat ride even though the weather looks stormy. Peter claims that he is familiar with boats and they convince the owner of the boat to allow them to go out. Evie is left behind.

Hours go by and the storm worsens. Palm Beach is evacuated and Evie is forced to leave the hotel and join the rest of the community to wait out the hurricane. Her parents and Peter have not yet returned.

A day goes by and finally Evie is reunited with her parents. However, Peter went overboard during the storm and drowned. Evie and her parents get ready to go home, but Peter’s body is found and the local police suspect foul-play. Joe and Beverly are called in for questioning and the case goes to trial.

Evie is then forced to relive the past few weeks looking at the situation from a different perspective and she doesn’t like what she sees. She alone learns the truth about the relationships between Peter, Joe, and Beverly. Evie makes the decision to save her parents by lying. Finally, they all go home.

== Critical acclaim ==
What I Saw and How I Lied was well received by reviewers. Publishers Weekly gave it a starred review and called it "a stylish, addictive brew" for age 12 and older. The Alan Review claimed that "Evie is fascinatingly multifaceted as she approaches adulthood in ways she—and readers—never anticipated."

What I Saw and How I Lied also received starred reviews from School Library Journal and The Bulletin of the Center for Children's Books.
