= Tracker (Canadian TV series) =

2001 Canadian TV series

- Created by: Gil Grant
- Starring: Adrian Paul; Amy Price-Francis; Leanne Wilson; Geraint Wyn Davies
- Country of origin: Canada
- Original language: English
- No. of episodes: 22

Production
- Running time: 60 mins.
- Production companies: Modern Entertainment; Future Film Group; Lions Gate Television

Original release
- Network: Space
- Release: 15 October 2001 – 3 June 2002

Tracker is a 2001 Canadian science fiction television series starring Adrian Paul and Amy Price-Francis, which aired on Space for a total of 22 episodes.

The series is based on a short story by Gil Grant and Jeannine Renshaw. The pilot episode and two other episodes were edited into the film Alien Tracker.

== Plot synopsis ==
Tracker is the story of Daggon, an alien life form who lands on Earth from the planet Cirron on a mission to recapture 218 prisoners who had escaped from the planet SAR TOP in the Migar Solar System in the form of "life forces," which then took over various human identities. He has a device to capture the life forces and contain them in spheres, after which he is to return them to SAR TOP. He lands in an abandoned field in the outskirts of Chicago where he takes on the form of an underwear model and adopts the name "Cole" from an underwear ad he sees on a billboard. He later meets Mel Porter, a Chicago bar owner with an outgoing British bartender that she inherited along with her grandmother's police bar. Though initially wary, Mel gradually comes to accept Cole and lets him stay, offering him some of her ex-boyfriend's clothes.

A brilliant scientist named Zin engineered the jailbreak from SAR-TOP prison, located 100 million light-years away from Earth. Zin created a wormhole, which allows almost instantaneous travel from the Migar solar system to Earth. The wormhole ends in Chicago, where Zin and the escapees have taken over the bodies of human beings and blended into society, but still retain some of their alien otherworldly abilities.

With an army of escaped alien convicts, Zin creates a criminal empire, not unlike the mafia, over which he can rule as Godfather supreme. However, as Cole will discover, Zin may have a larger agenda in mind than running illegal enterprises for profit, an agenda that might carry interplanetary implications.

Cole must find the fugitives and stop them before they can carry out their plans, using Mel's help and constant guidance to do so.

== Cast ==
- Adrian Paul as Cole/Daggon
- Amy Price-Francis as Mel Porter
- Leanne Wilson as Jess Brown
- Geraint Wyn Davies as Zin
- Richard Yearwood as Nestov
- Caitlin Greer as Recurring Teen Panelist

== Alien species ==
Cirronians
Cirronians are energy-based lifeforms that inhabit the planet Cirron in the Migar system. Cirronians have the abilities to move at hyperspeed, which weakens them if used more than once a day; manipulate energy; heal; and telekinesis. They are weakened by the cold, prolonged exposure can be fatal. Their strength is increased by heat.
Desserians
The Desserians evolved on a desert world in the Migar System. Apparently, not descended from predators, they were forced to develop extreme blending abilities, not unlike the Earth chameleon. As such, Desserians are extremely difficult to spot in a crowd, as they can also blend into social groups with ease. Much of the plant life on their home planet is poisonous. As a result, Desserian taste buds act as portable chemical laboratories to spot poisons before they enter the bloodstream.
Although there have been several minor Desserian characters such as Zareth and Suudor, the only main Desserian character was Nestov, a good-natured fugitive con-artist. When he was first admitted to the prison planet, Nestov falsified his records to pass himself off as a Nodulian, a more aggressive species.
Enixians
Enixians have preternaturally heightened senses of smell, hearing and taste, which is both a blessing and a curse on planets such as Earth which has odors, sounds and flavors that Enixians are not familiar with on their own planet.
Although there have been several minor Enixian characters such as Kaden and Trof there was never a main or recurring Enixian character.
Nodulians
On their planet, Nodulians spend most of their lives under water, on Earth they need to regularly submerge in water with a high level of zinc in it to survive. They are also weakened by heat which would merely irritate a human.
Orsusians
The Orsusians are born in pairs and are telepathic by nature. They are identified by a metal collar worn around the neck, used to focus their telepathic ability. They also have the ability to move underground.
Vardians
The Vardians are the most aggressive of the six alien species, they are super strong and have some telekinetic ability; Zin is the only Vardian seen to be able to manipulate energy like the Cirronians (Cole/Dagon) do.

== Episodes ==
1. Pilot
2. Cloud Nine
3. Roswell (aka Area 51)
4. Trust
5. The Plague
6. The Beast
7. Without a Trace
8. Children of the Night
9. Breach
10. Double Down
11. Native Son
12. To Catch a Desserian
13. The Miracle
14. Love, Cirronian Style
15. Eye of the Storm
16. Dark Road Home
17. A Made Guy
18. Fever of the Hunt (1)
19. Fever of the Hunt (2)
20. Back Into the Breach
21. What Lies Beneath
22. Remember When

== Telecast and home media ==
As of 2024, the series is now available on Tubi.

As of January 17, 2026 it's available to stream on Amazon Prime Video.
