= Becca Fitzpatrick =

American author

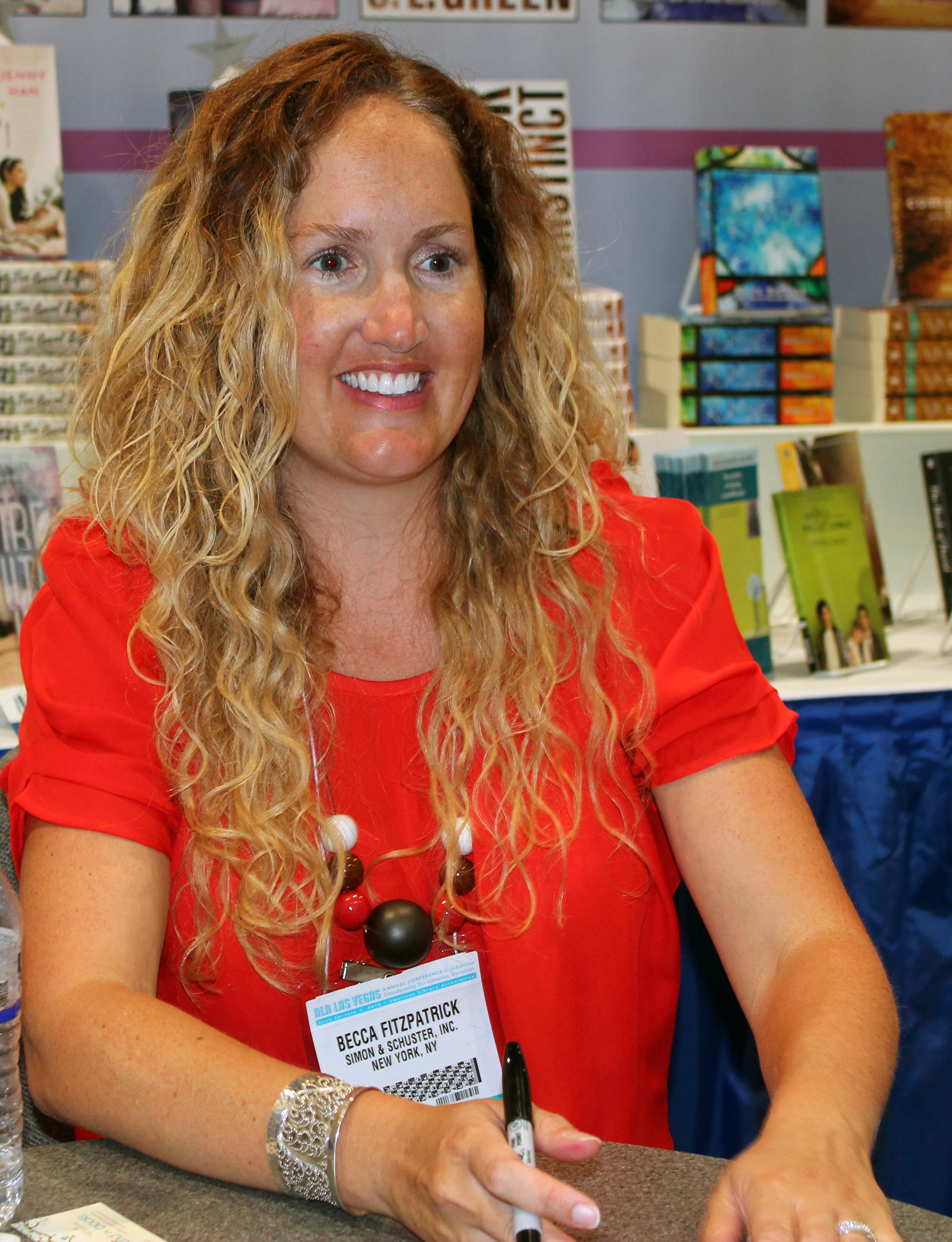
- Becca Fitzpatrick in 2014
- Born: February 3, 1979 (age 47)
- Education: Brigham Young University
- Occupation: Novelist
- Writing career
- Genres: Fantasy, Young adult fiction, Romance
- Notable works: Hush, Hush series, Black Ice

Becca Fitzpatrick (born February 3, 1979) is an American author, best known for having written the New York Times bestseller Hush, Hush, a young adult novel published in 2009 by Simon & Schuster Books for Young Readers. She wrote three sequels to Hush, Hush (Crescendo, Silence, and Finale), along with two separate novels (Black Ice and Dangerous Lies). Fitzpatrick also contributed to the short story collection Kiss Me Deadly: 13 Tales of Paranormal Love.

== Early and personal life ==
Becca Fitzpatrick was born in February 3, 1979 in Ogden, Utah. Fitzpatrick grew up as a member of the Church of Jesus Christ of Latter-day Saints and says that while her writing style was not directly influenced by her religion, there are hints of it across her novel in themes like "redemption".

== The Hush, Hush saga ==
Fitzpatrick wrote the Hush, Hush saga after enrolling in an online writing class. It took her four years and several rejection letters to publish the first book, Hush, Hush, in 2009. The series contains four books: Hush, Hush (2009); Crescendo (2010); Silence (2011); and Finale (2012). Due to its similar themes, the series appealed to fans of Stephenie Meyer's novel Twilight.

In July 2021, Fitzpatrick announced a movie was in production. It has since been indefinitely delayed.

== Reception ==
The reception of Fitzpatrick’s novels has been mixed. Reviews for Hush, Hush were positive; the novel ranked number ten on The New York Times Best Seller list in November 2011.

Crescendo, Silence, and Finale received mixed reviews. The series has an active fanbase on Reddit.

== Bibliography ==
The Hush, Hush Saga

- Hush, Hush (2009)
- Crescendo (2010)
- Silence (2011)
- Finale (2012)

Standalone novels and compilations

- Dangerous Lies (2015)
- Black Ice (2014)
- Kiss Me Deadly: 13 Tales of Paranormal Love (2010): A compilation of 13 short stories written by different authors: Fitzpatrick, Caitlin Kittredge, Karen Mahoney, Justine Musk, Daniel Marks, Diana Peterfreund, Sarah Rees Brennan, Michelle Rowen, Carrie Ryan, Maggie Stiefvater, Rachel Vincent, Daniel Waters and Michelle Zink.
