= Hush, Hush (series) =

Series of four novels by Becca Fitzpatrick

- Hush, Hush; Crescendo; Silence; Finale
- Author: Becca Fitzpatrick
- Country: United States
- Genre: Young adult supernatural
- Publisher: Simon & Schuster
- Published: October 13, 2009; October 19, 2010; October 23, 2012
- Media type: Print
- No. of books: 4

The Hush, Hush quartet is a series of four novels by Becca Fitzpatrick that follow teenager Nora Grey as she falls in love with the fallen angel Patch and discovers her own angelic heritage. The first book in the series, Hush, Hush, was released on October 13, 2009 through Simon & Schuster, with the final novel in the series, Finale, releasing on October 23, 2012. The series was initially promoted as a trilogy, with later announcements stating that the series would comprise four books.

Film rights to the series have been purchased by LD Entertainment and book rights have been sold in 13 countries. The movie adaptation has cast Liana Liberato as Nora Grey and Wolfgang Novogratz as Patch Cipriano.

== Synopsis ==
=== Hush, Hush ===
Nora Grey meets Patch Cipriano in her biology class. She finds herself drawn to him despite him initially trying to assassinate her, and despite her friends preferring that she date their friend Elliot, who is later revealed to be a pawn of the Nephilim Jules. Patch saves Nora from death multiple times because he realizes he has fallen in love with her. Even though Nora believes he is stalking her, she eventually gives in to her feelings for Patch after he reveals he is a fallen angel who is protecting her. Jules, also known by the name Chauncey Langeais, attempts to use Nora as a way to target Patch, but fails and is killed when Nora jumps off of a gym ceiling rafter and dies, severing the blood-related tie between Nora and him. She is brought back by Patch, who then becomes her guardian angel.

=== Crescendo ===
In Crescendo, Nora finds that her relationship with Patch has hit a rough spot when he stops returning her calls and refuses to tell her that he loves her in his car when she admits her love for him. She is hurt when she discovers that Patch has been standing outside of rival girl named Marcie's window. Patch explains he cannot tell Nora he loves her because it would potentially send him to Hell. This prompts her to begin talking to Scott Parnell, an old friend and possible Nephilim, and use him to make Patch jealous. Nora becomes involved in a fight in the process and ends up firing Patch as her guardian angel. Through Scott she finds that a person called the Black Hand killed her father. Nora becomes more depressed as she sees Patch start a relationship with Marcie and believes he has sent her a drugged apology letter. It is eventually revealed that Nora's mother had an affair with Marcie's father Hank, prompting Marcie's vendetta against her. She also comes to think that Patch is the Black Hand and that he's now Marcie's guardian angel. The true identity of the Black Hand is later revealed to be Hank Millar, Marcie's father. However, Rixon, a fallen angel and Patch's best friend, is revealed to be behind most of the book's events. His Nephil vassal is Marcie's father, Hank, who is revealed to have impregnated Nora's mother years ago, making him her real father. Due to her true heritage, Rixon attempts to sacrifice her to kill his vassal and obtain a human body. In the process of sacrificing Nora, Scott interferes and is shot multiple times. Rixon shoots Nora in the arm and is about to kill her, but Patch appears and he is unsuccessful. The book ends with Rixon getting sent to Hell, Patch and Nora making up, and her real father, Hank, appearing and cornering them, capturing Nora and asking her if she was responsible for the death of Chauncey Langeais.

=== Silence ===
Nora cannot remember the last five months of her life, and it feels as though a piece of her is missing. She sees flashes of black everywhere and cannot figure out what it means, but is sure it is significant. To make matters worse, the father of her arch-nemesis is dating her mother. Nora works to piece together the missing part of her life, and in the search of it, meets someone who was initially cold to her, but eventually helped her succeed, possibly leading to love. Nora faces a blood oath, the possibility of death, and a new power that is thrown into her hands.

=== Finale ===
Cover for the final book, Finale

Nora and Patch devise a plan to bring the two sides to peace, but as time is ticking it is getting harder for Nora to decide if peace or war is best. Nora has many Nephil friends, including Scott and her new, sexy lieutenant Dante, who are determined to help her become the leader she needs to be, but as Nora goes deeper into the world of her new race she finds things that could destroy her, including a dark addiction that Nora might not be able to shake. In the end all plans of peace are lost and the Nephilim and the fallen angels must go to war. Dante is revealed to be the antagonist. At the end, Vee reveals that she was also Nephilim.

== Composition and publishing history ==
Silence was originally meant to be the final book of the series, but Fitzpatrick wanted to write a book set during Cheshvan, and wanted to please fans who were asking for a fourth book. Silence was originally called Tempest.

== Adaptations ==
=== Film adaptation ===
In December 2012 Entertainment Weekly announced that Lionsgate and LD Entertainment had optioned the rights to the series with the intention of turning it into a film series. Patrick Sean Smith has been confirmed to be writing the screenplay for the first film.

On July 8, 2014, Becca announced on her website that she has decided that now is not the right time to move forward with the Hush, Hush movie and did not renew the movie option with LD Entertainment.

On July 20, 2018, Becca posted an update stating that a Hush Hush movie would be headed to production 'very soon'. BCDF Pictures, along with Kalahari Film & Media, announced that Kellie Cyrus would be directing the film – who is best known for directing The Vampire Diaries and The Originals, as well as an episode of the drama You from Greg Berlanti and Sera Gamble.

On July 13, 2021, Becca announced that Hush, Hush had been greenlit for a film by SpringHill Company and Genius Entertainment Partner. There have been no updates since.

=== Graphic Novel ===
In 2011 Sea Lion Books published a graphic novel adaptation of Hush, Hush. Fitzpatrick stated that the graphic novel would consist of three volumes and that Jennyson Rosero would be drawing the series. During the book's development Fitzpatrick solicited reader reactions by posting preliminary images on her website, with Sea Lion Books altering some of the designs based on how they were received.

== Reception ==
Critical reception for the series has been mostly positive, with Crescendo spending ten weeks on the New York Times Best Sellers list and being named one of YALSA's Teens’ Top Ten for 2011. Kirkus Reviews praised the first entry but gave a mixed review of Crescendo, remarking that the plot was "drawn out" and shared many similarities to the first novel.

Silence was nominated for the 2011 Goodreads Choice Awards for Reader's Favorite Young Adult Fantasy & Science Fiction and Reader's Favorite Goodreads author.

== Bibliography ==
- Hush, Hush (2009)
- Crescendo (2010)
- Silence (2011)
- Finale (2012)
