= King (2011 TV series) =

2011-2012 Canadian television police drama

- Genre: Police procedural
- Created by: Bernard Zukerman; Greg Spottiswood
- Starring: Amy Price-Francis; Alan van Sprang; Gabriel Hogan; Tony Nardi; Ali Kazmi
- Country of origin: Canada
- Original language: English
- No. of seasons: 2
- No. of episodes: 21

Production
- Executive producers: Bernard Zukerman; Greg Spottiswood
- Production locations: Toronto, Ontario
- Production companies: Indian Grove Productions Beta Films Shaw Media; Reelz

Original release
- Network: Showcase (Canada); Reelz (United States)
- Release: April 17, 2011 – May 25, 2012

King is a Canadian police drama which premiered April 17, 2011, on Showcase. The series stars Amy Price-Francis as Jessica King, a veteran police officer who gets promoted to head of the Major Crimes Task Force in Toronto after her predecessor has a breakdown on television. Season 2 began production in September 2011 and premiered on February 29, 2012.

On June 2, 2012, it was reported that King had been cancelled after two seasons.

== Cast ==
- Amy Price-Francis as Detective Staff Sergeant Jessica King, the new head of the Major Crimes Task Force with eight years working Homicide, two failed marriages, and a desire to have an idyllic family life. Pilot Episode starts with King relegated to Communications section.
- Gabriel Hogan as Danny Sless, an officer with the "Guns and Gangs" squad and Jessica's current husband
- Tony Nardi as Police Chief Peter Graci
- Suzanne Coy as Detective Eleni Demaris (season 1)
- Zoe Doyle as Detective MK Gordon (season 1)
- Aaron Poole as Detective Jason Collier (season 1)
- Alan van Sprang as Detective Sergeant Derek Spears, the former head of the Major Crimes Task Force and Jessica's partner
- Rossif Sutherland as Detective Pen Martin (season 2)
- Karen Robinson as Detective Ingrid Evans (season 2)

== Production ==
King was created by and is executive produced by Bernard Zukerman and Greg Spottiswood and is produced by Indian Grove Productions in association with Shaw Media. The show is filmed in Toronto making use of a combination of on-location shooting and the soundstages of Dufferin Gate Productions. Filming of the first season began in November 2010 and was scheduled to conclude in February 2011. The first two episodes of the show were directed by Clark Johnson. In speaking of the casting Johnson said that they had seen many actresses before Amy Price-Francis auditioned and that prior to her audition he wasn't convinced she was right for the role but she "just became the character" and now "she completely embodies this character" much like what happened with Michael Chiklis on The Shield, another pilot that he directed. The first season has eight episodes. Filming of season 2 is scheduled for 29 September 2011 through 30 March 2012 with post-production completed by 17 April 2012.

== Broadcast ==
The series premiered April 17, 2011 on Showcase in Canada, on May 19, 2011 it was announced that King will be shown on Séries+ for French-speaking Canadians. Shaw Media announced the renewal of the show on May 31, scheduling season two for a winter premiere on Showcase. The series was picked up by M6 for broadcast in France. The show premiered in Australia on TV1 in January 2012. The series has been picked up by the Universal Channel in the UK and premiered on April 5, 2012. The show premiered in The Netherlands on Net5 on March 4, 2012. In Germany the series premiered on VOX on October 17, 2012 with 1.17 million viewers and a total in sharing of 2,58 million viewers, making it the highest rated TV-programming in this slot on date. It was announced on June 18, 2013, that the series will air on Reelz in the United States starting on July 5, 2013. The series began airing reruns on sister network Ovation on January 11, 2021. It is part of the network's strategy to incorporate an internationally diverse lineup with more Canadian and British co-productions upon the success of other British and Canadian productions such as Murdoch Mysteries for the 2020–21 American television season. The network also acquired one other series that was initially co-produced by Reelz and CBC and one that had not hit the US that is from Global Television Network in Canada: Remedy and Cracked, respectively.

== Episodes ==
=== Series overview ===
Season	Episodes	Originally released	
Season	Episodes	First released	Last released
1	8	April 17, 2011	June 5, 2011
2	13	February 29, 2012	May 25, 2012

=== Season 1 (2011) ===
No. overall	No. in season	Title	Directed by	Written by	Original release date	CAN viewers (millions)
1	1	"Lori Gilbert"	Clark Johnson	Greg Spottiswood	April 17, 2011	N/A
Chief Graci tells Jess King that she has been put in charge of the Major Crimes Task Force. King must prove herself quickly by finding a missing girl.
2	2	"T-Bone"	Clark Johnson	David Barlow	April 24, 2011	0.207
King gambles that a jailed biker, apparently willing to go undercover, can help her solve some drug-trafficking murders that the Drug Squad has only further tangled up for her.
3	3	"Amanda Jacobs"	Jerry Ciccoritti	Emily Andras and Alex Levine	May 1, 2011	0.129
When a detective refutes a girl's claim that she was a victim of the Riverdale Rapist, King takes over but suspects the sexual predator lurks closer to home.
4	4	"Eleni Demaris"	Holly Dale	Sara B. Cooper	May 8, 2011	0.213
When one of the team's detectives is beaten during a home invasion, King has to team up with a Robbery Squad detective she doesn't trust.
5	5	"Farah Elliot"	TW Peacocke	Emily Andras	May 15, 2011	N/A
King discovers that a killer, whom she couldn't amass enough evidence against to convict, is back in Toronto. This time, she goes to career-risking lengths to nab him.
6	6	"Ahmad Khan"	Don McBrearty	Jennifer Kennedy & David Barlow	May 22, 2011	0.163
A university bio-chemistry professor's found murdered, and not just his religion but his sexuality complicate the list of usual suspects.
7	7	"Cameron Bell"	Phil Earnshaw	Alex Levine	May 29, 2011	0.167
A video emerges of an officer, the partner of King's husband, beating an informant. King is given the suspended pair's ongoing case--a murder at a skating rink.
8	8	"Scout Winter"	Jerry Ciccoritti	Greg Spottiswood	June 5, 2011	0.137
King's put on the headline-grabbing case of the beating of an anti-racist activist, but it turns out that her prime suspect, a skinhead, is a federal agent working undercover.

=== Season 2 (2012) ===
No. overall	No. in season	Title	Directed by	Written by	Original release date	CAN viewers (millions)
9	1	"Alina Minkute"	Jerry Ciccoritti	Adriana Maggs	February 29, 2012	0.109
The death of a stripper after a domestic disturbance leaves King and Major Crimes Task Force leading the investigation. The drowned stripper is linked to the son of Jessica's old boss the former chief of police. King like the stripper is 8 weeks pregnant, but unlike the dead girl who is pregnant with the son, Jr.'s child. The father of Jess's kid still is unknown, even though King insists it's her husband Danny's. Danny and Jessica are in the middle of paying off Danny's bookie for the sum of $50,000. To come up with the money they have moved into a condo, and Jes is selling shoes.
10	2	"Josh Simpson"	Lee Rose	Adam Pettle	March 7, 2012	0.094
King and her team investigate the shooting of an officer at an illegal poker game.
11	3	"Jamila Karan"	Jerry Ciccoritti	David Barlow	March 14, 2012	0.064
The daughter of a jewellery-buyer is kidnapped. After some other cops interfere in what they didn't know to be a ransom drop-off, the Major Crimes Task Force is brought in to fix things. King becomes worried about her pregnancy.
12	4	"Charlene Francis"	Robert Lieberman	Patrick Tarr	March 21, 2012	0.054
King's ex-husband, a Detective Sergeant (Shawn Doyle), has his car stolen. In the back seat is a computer with case files revealing the identity of an undercover officer.
13	5	"Sunil Sharma"	Don McBrearty	Brad Simpson	March 28, 2012	0.140
After a lead detective can't handle the case of a murdered Hindu family, King brings in her team to figure out whether or not it was an honour killing.
14	6	"Freddy Boise"	Jerry Ciccoritti	John Krizanc	April 4, 2012	0.080
A heart goes missing before a transplant and King's team must track it down. King's father falls ill.
15	7	"Jared and Stacey Cooper"	George Mihalka	Greg Spottiswood	April 13, 2012	0.049
King and her team investigate the apparent murder-suicide of a wife and her MMA-fighter husband. King takes an old woman, arrested for throwing stones at a car, under her wing.
16	8	"Isabelle Toomey"	Don McBrearty	Morwyn Brebner & Adam Pettle	April 20, 2012	0.079
Chief Graci asks King to look into a 15-year cold case that still haunts him, taking her away from preparations for Thanksgiving dinner with her family.
17	9	"Chris Harris"	Lee Rose	David Barlow	April 27, 2012	0.060
Evans discovers that false testimony may have been given in her brother's murder trial. King finds out why healthy pregnancies are unlikely for her as long as she's with Danny.
18	10	"Alicia Pratta"	Jerry Ciccoritti	Charlotte Corbeil-Coleman & Greg Spottiswood	May 4, 2012	0.042
King and her team investigate the sexual assault of the daughter of a woman whose own sexual assault, years earlier, was mishandled by the Winnipeg police. King and Danny start the adoption process.
19	11	"Justice Calvin Faulkner"	Don McBrearty	Brad Simpson & Patrick Tarr	May 11, 2012	0.058
King must contain a scandal and delve into the messy personal life of a Family Court Judge after he’s found strangled with a negligee.
20	12	"Aurora O'Donnell"	Jerry Ciccoritti	Raymond Storey	May 18, 2012	0.087
Aurora O'Donnell's 911 call leads police to a corpse-dumping ground north of the city. King and her team must find the serial killer responsible.
21	13	"Wendy Stetler"	Don McBrearty	Greg Spottiswood	May 25, 2012	N/A
Scott Spivak is dead, but King is convinced his uncle is responsible for some of the Lake Road killings. But with no evidence, another suspect, and turmoil in her personal life, can she close the case?

== Home media ==
On 6 March 2012, Entertainment One released season 1 on DVD in Canada only. In 2013, Season 2 was released on DVD in the UK.

== Reception ==
Bill Brioux notes that King is one of many new shows premiering in April 2011 which is making April to be the "new September", the traditional time for premiering new series in North America. "Spring really is the new fall on specialty channels." In reviewing the first episode Brioux found it "seemed pretty seen-it-before" but that Amy Price-Francis "has sass and sparkle which should enliven a drama with a bit of a dark comedy tone." Cassandra Szklarski points out that with the "recent explosion in Hogtown-based series" such as Flashpoint, Rookie Blue, and The Listener the unique spin of setting a cop drama in Toronto is no longer so unique. Szklarski admits that King is another "urban whodunit" but that it goes about it from a distinctively female point of view. Eric Volmers of the Calgary Herald found the fallibility of the character Derek Spears to be "what promises to give King its continued dramatic tension." Bill Harris of Quebecor Media found King is "not a cookie-cutter police procedural" in that DS King's personal life is a significant part of the show.
