= Rumours (TV series) =

Canadian television sitcom

- Genre: Sitcom
- Starring: David Haydn-Jones; Amy Price-Francis; Sadie Leblanc; Jennifer Dale; Stephanie Mills; Lucinda Davis
- Country of origin: Canada
- No. of episodes: 20

Production
- Running time: 30 minutes

Original release
- Network: CBC Television
- Release: October 9, 2006 – 2007

Rumours is a Canadian television sitcom, that aired on CBC Television in 2006 and 2007. The show centred on Ben and Sarah, co-editors of a women's magazine in Toronto.

Based on the successful Quebec sitcom Rumeurs, the show was produced by Moses Znaimer and written by Isabelle Langlois. Twenty episodes were made, of which nine aired in 2006 before the show was cancelled due to low ratings. The last 11 episodes aired in the summer of 2007.

== Cast ==
- David Haydn-Jones as Ben Devlin
- Amy Price-Francis as Sarah Barnaby
- Sadie Leblanc
- Jennifer Dale
- Stephanie Anne Mills
- Lucinda Davis

== Episode list ==
1. One of Those Days
2. First Impressions
3. A Good Man Is Hard to Find
4. Rivalries
5. Close Up
6. The Real Thing
7. 25 Ways to Drive Him Wild
8. Moments to Cherish
9. Dizzy Spells
10. The Shadow of Doubt
11. Telling Details
12. The Slightest Imperfection
13. Bumps in the Night
14. Erroneous Zone
15. Unforgettable
16. The Moment of Truth
17. Look Before You Leap
18. Chaos? What Chaos?
19. My Life Is a Soap Opera Pt 1
20. My Life Is a Soap Opera Pt 2
