= Obi-Wan Kenobi Street =

Street in the town of Grabowiec, Poland

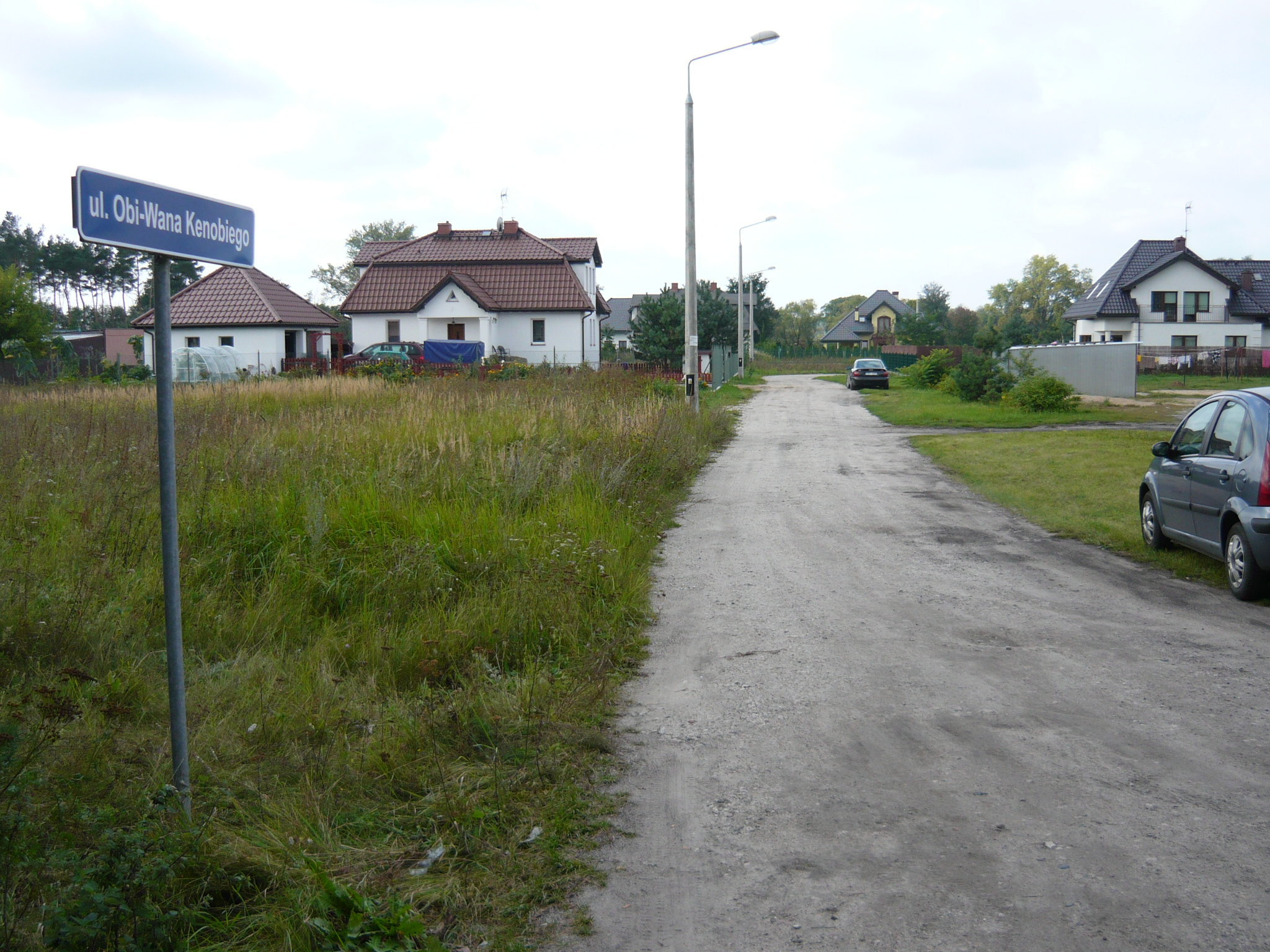
- Obi-Wan Kenobi Street in 2011.
- Native name: Ulica Obi-Wana Kenobiego (Polish)
- Namesake: Obi-Wan Kenobi
- Location: Grabowiec, Toruń County, Kuyavian-Pomeranian Voivodeship, Poland

Obi-Wan Kenobi Street (Polish: ulica Obi-Wana Kenobiego) is a street in the village of Grabowiec in Toruń County, Kuyavian-Pomeranian Voivodeship, Poland. The street is named after Obi-Wan Kenobi, a fictional character in the Star Wars franchise.

== History ==
The street name was proposed by Leszek Budkiewicz, a member of the community council of Gmina Lubicz, which contains Grabowiec. The proposition was accepted on 30 December 2004, and came into force fourteen days later.

The street has attracted numerous visitors, including the Star Wars actors Gerald Home and Paul Blake in 2008. In 2009, during a Star Force convention, Star Wars fans visited the street while wearing various Star Wars-themed costumes.

The street inspired propositions to name streets in other Polish cities after Obi-Wan Kenobi, including in Bielsko-Biała and Kraków.

In 2021, the street was rebuilt, with its surface being updated from dirt to concrete. The investment cost 580,000 Polish złoty, of which 290,000 was covered by the Local Government Roads Fund.
