= Star Wars: Science Adventures =

Star Wars Science Adventures is an incomplete series written for young readers that explores physics through examples in the Star Wars universe. The two novels published were released in February 1999 and were authored by Jude Watson and K.D. Burkett. The novels ended in a cliffhanger; the second never being resolved.

The stories take place soon after the Battle of Yavin, approximately 0 ABY. The series tell the story of a young rebel named Stuart Zissu, and the droids C-3PO, R2-D2, and Forbee-X. There are also cameos of Han Solo, Luke Skywalker and Princess Leia.

== Books in series ==
- Emergency in Escape Pod Four
- Journey Across Planet X

== See also ==
- List of Star Wars books
- List of non-fiction Star Wars books
