= Star Wars: The Last of the Jedi =

Series of Star Wars novels

The Last of the Jedi
- Author: Jude Watson
- Language: English
- Series: Canon C
- Subject: Star Wars
- Genre: Science fiction
- Publisher: Scholastic
- Publication date: May 1, 2005 – October 5, 2008
- Publication place: United States
- Media type: Paperback

The Last of the Jedi is a series of young adult science-fiction novels written by Jude Watson from 2005 to 2008. The series is set in the fictional Star Wars Legends (formerly known as the Star Wars Expanded Universe and discarded from the canon in 2014), the series is set in the time period between the end of Star Wars: Episode III – Revenge of the Sith and a few years prior to Episode IV – A New Hope. This series follows the life of Obi-Wan Kenobi, following the events of Revenge of the Sith until he finds ex-Padawan Ferus Olin. The remainder of the series focuses on a small band of surviving Jedi.
