= Star Wars Episode I Journal =

Star Wars novel series

The Star Wars Episode I Journal is a young adult science fiction series published by Scholastic, written by different authors, and recounting the story of Star Wars: Episode I – The Phantom Menace from the perspective of different characters. It is the second Journal series after Star Wars Journal (1998) which recounted the story of Star Wars Episode IV: A New Hope (1977).

== Star Wars Episode I Journal: Anakin Skywalker ==
Star Wars Episode I Journal: Anakin Skywalker is a 1999 novel by Todd Strasser, taking the point of view of one of its main characters, Anakin Skywalker.

== Star Wars Episode I Journal: Queen Amidala ==
Star Wars Episode I Journal: Queen Amidala is a 1999 novel by Jude Watson, written from the point of view of Padmé Amidala.

== Star Wars Episode I Journal: Darth Maul ==
Star Wars Episode I Journal: Darth Maul is a 2000 novel by Jude Watson, written from the point of view of one of its supporting villains, Darth Maul.
