= Amy Price-Francis =

British-Canadian actress (born 1975)

- Born: Amy Elizabeth Price-Francis; 16 September 1975 (age 50); England, UK
- Occupation: Actress
- Years active: 1998–present

Amy Elizabeth Price-Francis (born 16 September 1975) is a British-Canadian actress. She starred as Detective Jessica King on the Showcase drama, King.

== Life and career ==
Price-Francis was born in England and raised in Toronto, Ontario, Canada. She is a graduate of the National Theatre School of Canada.

Amy is known for starring in several Canadian series, including Tracker and Rumours. She also starred in the A&E show, The Cleaner. Furthermore, she has guest starred in several shows. One of her well-known guest-starring roles is that of minor antagonist Cara Bowden on the TV series 24.

== Filmography ==
=== Film ===
Film
Year	Title	Role	Notes
2001	Invitation	Amy	
2003	Alien Tracker	Mel Porter	Video
2005	Cake	Sasha	
2013	Breakout	Maria	
2014	The Purge: Anarchy	Mrs. Grass	
2015	Girl on the Edge	Anne Green	
2017	Fifty Shades Darker	Elizabeth "Liz" Morgan	
2018	Fifty Shades Freed	Elizabeth "Liz" Morgan	
2018	I Still See You	Mrs. Calder	

=== Television ===
Television
Year	Title	Role	Notes
1998	The Mystery Files of Shelby Woo	Kristen Chaklai	Episode: "The Jinxed Campaign Mystery"
1998–1999	Little Men	Amy Lawrence	18 episodes
2000	Twice in a Lifetime	Young Edwina Lewis	Episode: "Old Flames"
2000	Soul Food	Heather Bryant	Episode: "Man Trouble"
2001	The Associates		Episode: "Killing the Rat"
2001–2002	Tracker	Mel Porter	22 episodes
2003	The Pentagon Papers	Jan Butler	TV movie
2003	Mutant X	Janet Nicholls	Episode: "Final Judgment"
2003	Missing	Layla Weller	Episode: "Deliverance from Evil"
2003	Train 48	Nicole Svendsen	TV series
2004	Snakes & Ladders	Shannon Jennings	6 episodes
2004	Sue Thomas: F.B.Eye	Ann Leland	Episode: "The Kiss"
2004	Suburban Madness	Joan	TV movie
2005	Kevin Hill	Michael Tobias	Episode: "A River in Egypt"
2005	Tilt	Angela	Episode: "Gentleman Jim"
2005	Our Fathers	Donna Morrissey	TV movie
2005	Show Me Yours	Araminta	Episode: "Plus ca change"
2006	Corner Gas	Connie	Episode: "Friend of a Friend"
2006	Earthstorm	Dr. Lana Gale	TV movie
2006	Shades of Black: The Conrad Black Story	Shirley Black	TV movie
2006–2007	Rumours	Sarah Barnaby	20 episodes
2007	The Wedding Bells	Cheryl	Episode: "Fools in Love"
2007	Medium	Pamela Franklin	Episode: "Everything Comes to a Head"
2007	The Dead Zone	Megan Wilcox	Episode: "Re-Entry"
2007	Californication	Meredith	4 episodes
2007	Shark	Amanda Sellers	Episode: "Eye of the Beholder"
2007	K-Ville	Heidi Lawrence	Episode: "Critical Mass"
2008	K-Ville	Heidi Lawrence	Episode: "Game Night"
2008	Big Shots	Victoria Hill	Episode: "Who's the Boss?"
2008–2009	The Cleaner	Melissa Banks	26 episodes
2009	24	Cara Bowden	6 episodes
2009	Nip/Tuck	Vivien	Episode: "Enigma"
2010	The Mentalist	Alicia Seberg	Episode: "Code Red"
2010	Life Unexpected	Kelly Campbell	Recurring role
2011	The Chicago Code	Dina Wysocki	4 episodes
2011	Criminal Minds	Andi Swan	Episode: "Supply and Demand"
2011	Grey's Anatomy	Susannah Wilson	Episode: "She's Gone"; Episode: "Free Falling"
2011–2012	King	Jessica King	Main role
2014	Republic of Doyle	Victoria Hickey	Episode: "The Pint" (Season 6, Episode 6)
2016	NCIS: New Orleans	Kayla Anderson	Episode: "Radio Silence" (Season 2, Episode 17)

== Awards ==
Year	Award	Category	Work nominated	Result
2012	ACTRA Awards	Outstanding Performance – Female	King	Won
2013	Canadian Screen Awards	Best Performance by an Actress in a Continuing Leading Dramatic Role	King	Nominated
