= Star Wars Journal =

Star Wars novel series

- Cover art of Captive to Evil
- Captive to Evil (1998); Hero for Hire (1998); The Fight for Justice (1998)
- Author: Jude Watson (Captive to Evil); Donna Tauscher (Hero for Hire); John Peel (The Fight for Justice)
- Country: United States
- Language: English
- Genre: Science fiction
- Publisher: Scholastic Press
- Published: July 1998
- Media type: Paperback
- No. of books: 3
- Followed by: Star Wars Episode I Journal

The Star Wars Journal is a young adult science fiction series published by Scholastic, written by different authors, and recounting the story of Star Wars Episode IV: A New Hope (1977) from the perspective of different characters. A second series, Star Wars Episode I Journal, recounting the story of Star Wars: Episode I – The Phantom Menace (1999) was released in 1999 and 2000.

== Captive to Evil ==
Star Wars Journal: Captive to Evil is a 1998 young adult novel by science fiction author Jude Watson. The novel recounts the events of the film Star Wars Episode IV: A New Hope from the point of view of one of its main characters, Princess Leia.

== Hero for Hire ==
Star Wars Journal: Hero for Hire is a 1998 young adult novel by science fiction author Donna Tauscher. The novel recounts the events of the film Star Wars Episode IV: A New Hope from the point of view of one of its main characters, Han Solo.

== The Fight for Justice ==
Star Wars Journal: The Fight for Justice is a 1998 young adult novel by science fiction author John Peel. The novel recounts the events of the film Star Wars Episode IV: A New Hope from the point of view of one of its main characters, Luke Skywalker.
