= Brides of Wildcat County =

- Author: Jude Watson
- Language: English
- Series: Brides of Wildcat County, Book 2 & Book 3
- Genre: Young adult fiction
- Publisher: Alladin Paperbacks
- Publication date: September 1995
- Publication place: United States
- Media type: Print (hardcover)
- Pages: 178 pp (first edition)
- ISBN: 0-689-80326-5 (prefer 1st edition)
- Followed by: Scandalous: Eden's Story (Brides of Wildcat County, No. 2)

The Brides of Wildcat County is a romance series books written by Jude Watson for young adults. It is set during the California Gold Rush, in the fictional town of Last Chance, and detail the lives of various girls who went West in an answer to an ad asking for potential brides for the town. The books in the series are Dangerous: Savannah's Story, Scandalous: Eden's Story, Audacious: Ivy's Story, Impetueous: Mattie's Story, and Tempesteous: Opal's Story.
