= Grabowiec, Toruń County =

Grabowiec
- Village
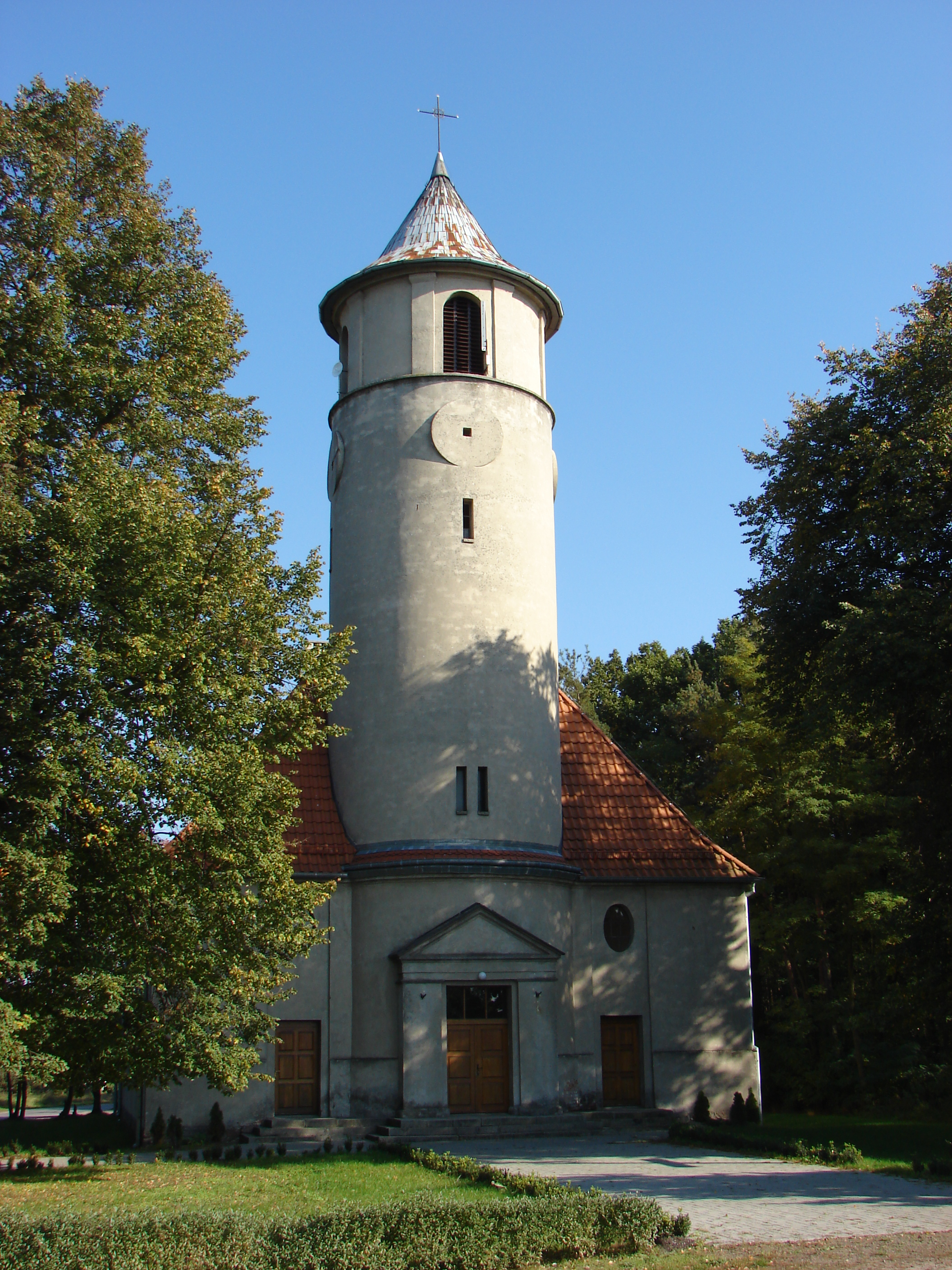
- Church of Jesus Christ. Built 1922.

- Location within Poland
- Coordinates: 52°57′N 18°43′E
- Country: Poland
- Voivodeship: Kuyavian-Pomeranian
- County: Toruń
- Gmina: Lubicz
- Population: 570

Grabowiec [ɡraˈbɔvjɛt͡s] is a village in the administrative district of Gmina Lubicz, within Toruń County, Kuyavian-Pomeranian Voivodeship, in north-central Poland.

In April 2005, one of its streets was named Obi-Wan Kenobi Street (Polish: ulica Obi-Wana Kenobiego) after the famous Jedi master from Star Wars movies.

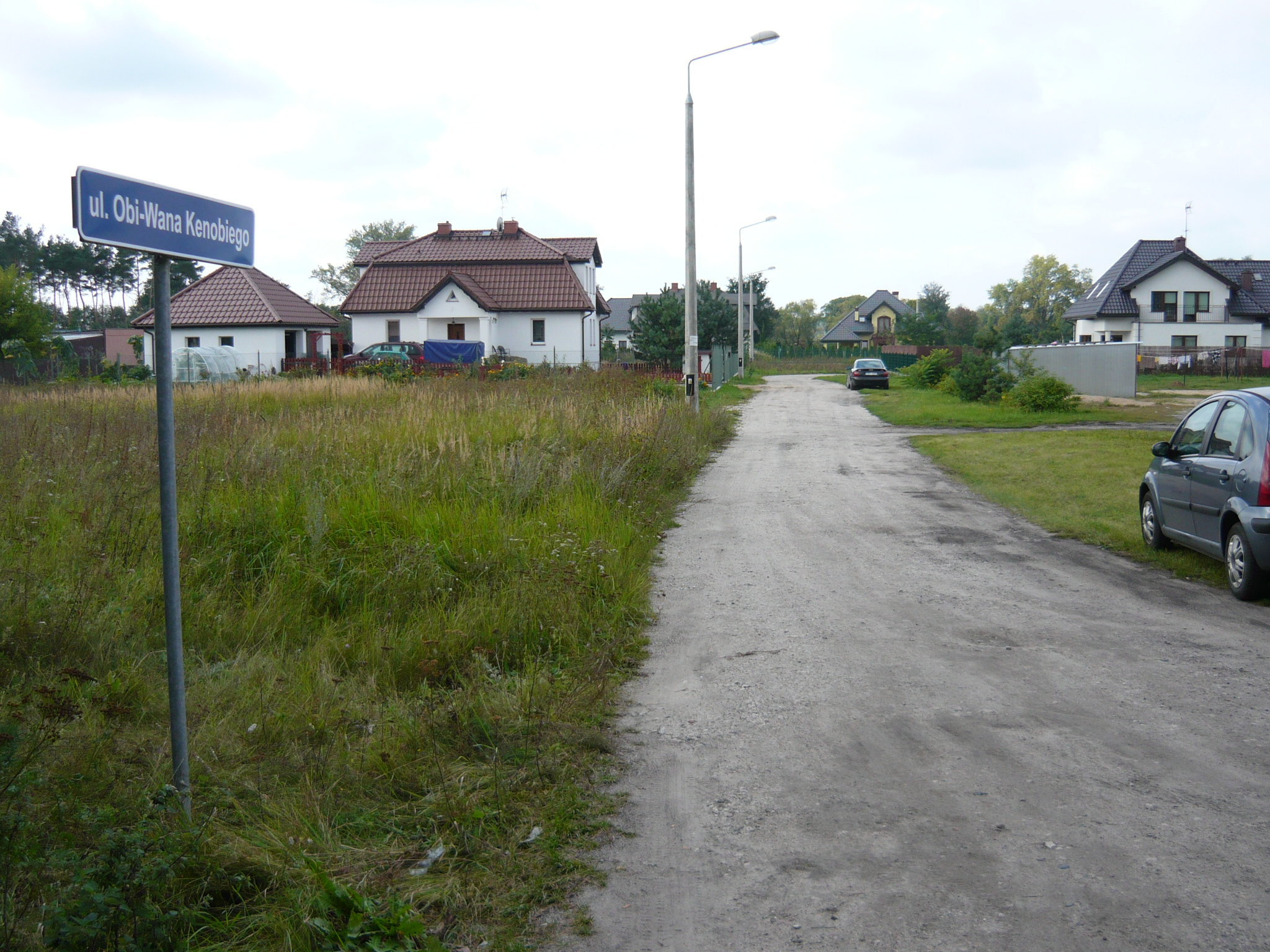
The Kenobi street
