= Star Wars: Jedi Apprentice =

Novel series

Star Wars: Jedi Apprentice is a series of Star Wars young reader novels, published between 1999 and 2002. The series was primarily written by Jude Watson, although the first book was written by Dave Wolverton. The books follow the adventures of young Jedi Obi-Wan Kenobi and his Master, Qui-Gon Jinn, before the events of Star Wars: Episode I – The Phantom Menace. The series is primarily targeted at children aged 9 through 12, though due to the books' writing style and serial plot development, the novels have also found an audience among older readers.

== Series summary ==
=== Early days ===
Obi-Wan Kenobi must become an apprentice by his thirteenth birthday. Unfortunately, Qui-Gon Jinn, a Jedi Master without an apprentice, finds the boy to be aggressive and unpredictable, as shown in Obi-Wan's sparring match with fellow Jedi student Bruck Chun. Consequently, Obi-Wan is forced to use his Jedi powers as a special farmer on the world of Bandomeer. Coincidentally, Qui-Gon is also going to Bandomeer. On the way to Bandomeer, Obi-Wan and Qui-Gon join together to stop the abuse of Offworld Corporation, which wishes to control Bandomeer's resources for itself. At Bandomeer, Qui-Gon learns that his former apprentice, Xanatos, is the leader of Offworld. Although the small Offworld faction on Bandomeer is quickly put into check, Xanatos manages to escape the planet.

Because of the Offworld Corporation incidents, Qui-Gon decides to take Obi-Wan as his apprentice. On the planets of Phindar and Gala, the two are tested by a corrupt ruler named Prince Beju and a crime organization known as The Syndicat. These problems are eventually solved by the two Jedi, whose relationship continues to strengthen.

=== Divided relationship ===
However, on a mission to rescue the Jedi Knight Tahl from Melida/Daan, Obi-Wan's loyalties are compromised when he meets a group of adolescents and children known as the Young. This group of children attempts to stop the civil war between the Melida faction and the Daan faction, which results in numerous fatalities and the near death of Tahl, who was imprisoned by the Melida. Nevertheless, Obi-Wan is forced to make a choice: stay with the Jedi Order, or stay with the Young and attempt to bring stability to Melida/Daan. Obi-Wan chooses to leave the Order, much to the disappointment of Qui-Gon.

When Qui-Gon returns to the Jedi Temple, he learns that it is under attack by a mysterious power. On Melida/Daan, Obi-Wan manages to help the Young stop the civil war, but not without the deaths of several of the non-Jedi's newfound friends. With Obi-Wan desperate to return to the Order and Qui-Gon in need of his ex-Padawan's help, the two are quickly reunited. With their combined skills, they learn that Xanatos has infiltrated the Jedi Temple with the help of Obi-Wan's former rival, Bruck Chun. Obi-Wan's childhood friend, Bant, is caught directly in the middle of the situation. Eventually, Xanatos' plans to destroy the temple are thwarted, but Bruck is killed and Xanatos escapes.

To ensure justice, Qui-Gon and Obi-Wan pursue Xanatos to his home planet of Telos. There, they learn that Offworld Corporation (and, ultimately, Xanatos) is using a front called UniFy to manipulate and plunder the planet. After several games of cat and mouse, Xanatos is incriminated and cornered by Obi-Wan and Qui-Gon. Helpless, Xanatos commits suicide. After the mission, Obi-Wan and Qui-Gon officially become a Master-Padawan duo once more.

=== New missions ===
Obi-Wan, Qui-Gon, Adi Gallia, and Siri Tachi are sent to the backwater planet of Kegan to fetch a Force-sensitive baby, O-Lana. During the mission, Siri and Obi-Wan become trapped in the planet's learning center, which tries to brainwash Keganite children into an isolationist view of the galaxy. Meanwhile, Qui-Gon and Adi Gallia try to convince the planet's leaders into giving up Lana, though this quickly turns into a rescue mission once Siri and Obi-Wan are captured and sent to the learning center. After tense diplomatic and covert operations, the four Jedi are reunited, and Kegan is opened up to the Galaxy.

On a mission to the planet of Rutan and the moon of Senali, Obi-Wan and Qui-Gon must stop a tense political crisis, which nearly results in all-out civil war.

=== Jenna Zan Arbor trilogy ===
After Obi-Wan Kenobi's fourteenth birthday, a bounty hunter called Ona Nobis launches an attack on Qui-Gon's old friend, Didi. However, the attack was orchestrated to lure Qui-Gon into the hands of Jenna Zan Arbor, a Force-experimenting scientist. Qui-Gon is captured and taken to Simpla-12, where Zan Arbor performs a series of experiments on the Jedi Master. To maintain his calm, Qui-Gon is forced to endure torture and verbal jousting matches with the scientist.

Back on Coruscant, Obi-Wan is desperate to locate his old Master. Pairing up with Siri once again, Obi-Wan goes to Ona Nobis' world, Sorrus, to try to find a lead on where Qui-Gon was taken. Eventually, Obi-Wan, Siri, and Adi Gallia are led to Simpla-12, where they rescue Qui-Gon. However, Nobis and Zan Arbor escape to the planet of Belasco, whose senator, Uta S'orn, is a friend of Zan Arbor. With S'orn's political powers, Zan Arbor has complete control over Belasco by using a special virus to keep the planet sick long enough for an expensive cure to be provided. After some time, the Jedi catch up to the group, kill Nobis, and banish Zan Arbor and S'orn to a penal colony for their crimes.

=== New Apsolon trilogy ===
When Tahl rushes to New Apsolon on a mission to save a pair of politically powerful twins, Qui-Gon grows nervous. Qui-Gon and sixteen-year-old Obi-Wan go to New Apsolon to assist Tahl, where they encounter a planet locked in a struggle between the high class and the low class. During the mission to find Tahl, Qui-Gon realizes that his concern for Tahl goes beyond friendship. However, when Tahl and Qui-Gon do encounter each other, they pledge their love to each other. Immediately thereafter, Tahl is captured by Apsolon extremists once again.

Qui-Gon and Obi-Wan desperately search the entire planet for Tahl. When they do discover her, they are too late; Tahl dies by Qui-Gon's side. Grief-stricken, Qui-Gon goes into a rage and prepares to kill those who are responsible for her death. Disturbed over Qui-Gon's call to vengeance, the Jedi Council sends Mace Windu and Tahl's apprentice, Bant, to assist Obi-Wan in both the investigation and the containment of Qui-Gon's rage. Although Qui-Gon nearly gives in to his revenge, he manages to bring the people responsible to justice, and not death.

Tahl's death would plague Qui-Gon for several years, although he quickly returned to the line of duty less than a year after the New Apsolon crisis.

=== Final missions ===
On the planet of Frego, Qui-Gon and Obi-Wan must elude a criminal family to apprehend a witness to the lethal issues caused by the family. In response, the witness' family members try and stop the Jedi from bringing her to Coruscant, which results in multiple failed assassination attempts. However, the mission is a success, and the witness is brought to the Galactic Senate to testify against her family's crimes.

By this point, seventeen-year-old Obi-Wan Kenobi is coming of age. On a planet filled with work-obsessed life forms, Obi-Wan and Qui-Gon must prevent terrorist attacks from sparking an all-out civil war. During the mission, Qui-Gon gives Obi-Wan more command over certain aspects of the assignment, which gives Obi-Wan added responsibility on his journey toward becoming a Jedi Knight.

== Books in the series ==
The books include (in chronological order):

- The Rising Force (1999), by Dave Wolverton
- The Dark Rival (1999), by Jude Watson
- The Hidden Past (1999), by Jude Watson
- The Mark of the Crown (1999), by Jude Watson
- The Defenders of the Dead (1999), by Jude Watson
- The Uncertain Path (2000), by Jude Watson
- The Captive Temple (2000), by Jude Watson
- The Day of Reckoning (2000), by Jude Watson
- The Fight for Truth (2000), by Jude Watson
- The Shattered Peace (2000), by Jude Watson
- The Deadly Hunter (2000), by Jude Watson
- The Evil Experiment (2001), by Jude Watson
- The Dangerous Rescue (2001), by Jude Watson
- The Ties That Bind (2001), by Jude Watson
- The Death of Hope (2001), by Jude Watson
- The Call to Vengeance (2001), by Jude Watson
- The Only Witness (2002), by Jude Watson
- The Threat Within (2002), by Jude Watson

Special Editions

- Special Editions #1: Deceptions (2001), by Jude Watson
- Special Editions #2: The Followers (2002), by Jude Watson
