= Crescendo (Fitzpatrick novel) =

Book by Becca Fitzpatrick

- First edition
- Author: Becca Fitzpatrick
- Cover artist: Lucy Ruth Cummins (design)
- Language: English
- Series: Hush, Hush series
- Genre: Young adult, Fantasy, Romance
- Publisher: Simon & Schuster
- Publication date: October 19, 2010
- Publication place: United States
- Media type: Print (Hardcover)
- Pages: 432
- ISBN: 978-1-4169-8943-1
- Preceded by: Hush, Hush (2009)
- Followed by: Silence (2011)

Crescendo is a young adult paranormal romance novel by Becca Fitzpatrick and the second book in the Hush, Hush series. The book was first published on October 19, 2010 through Simon & Schuster and spent ten weeks on the New York Times Best Sellers list. The book was also voted as one of the Young Adult Library Services Association's Teens’ Top Ten for 2011.

== Plot ==
Nora and Patch's relationship is threatened by his refusal to tell her that he loves her and by his new fascination with Marcie. Hurt, Nora begins hanging out with her old friend Scott, whom she believes is a nephil. She discovers from Patch that Scott is indeed a nephil, but ultimately fires him as her guardian angel after she discovers him with Marcie. Nora is later given a letter that tells her that the "Black Hand" killed her father and is further distraught when Patch appears to be going out with Marcie. Nora undergoes several attempts on her life as well as several intense interactions with Patch. She tries to make him jealous by making out with Scott, which results in the two boys fighting.

Patch later offers to go rogue for Nora in order to be with her, but is refused because she doesn't want to be the cause of his downfall. Her feelings for Patch are even more conflicted when Rixon, a boy that her best friend Vee is dating, tells her that Patch is the Black Hand. Her emotions are put into further turmoil when Marcie tells her that Nora's mother has been having an affair with Marcie's father Hank for eleven years, the cause of Marcie's hatred for Nora. Already upset, Nora tries to break up with Patch when he tells her in a dream that he's Marcie's guardian angel, but he refuses.

The book then culminates in a showdown with her father's true killer, who is revealed to be Rixon. He tells her that not only was he behind all of the events in the book, but that he wants to use her as a sacrifice for a human body. He shoots Scott and Nora, who live, but is ultimately stopped by Patch. Rixon is later sent to Hell. The book concludes with Scott leaving in order to avoid further issues with the police, Nora and Patch reuniting, and Nora's biological father Hank asking Nora if she killed Chauncey.

== Development ==
Fitzpatrick told Metro France that she had to re-write the book from scratch after her editor hated the first version. Additionally, according to Fitzpatrick, the idea of Nora and Patch communicating through dreams came from her editor, and she initially didn't plan on leaving Crescendo on such a major dramatic twist. However, the idea came to her suddenly, and she stuck with it.

== Reception ==
Critical reception to Crescendo has been mixed, with Kirkus Reviews stating, "Just as the drawn-out plot answers Nora’s lingering questions, it introduces a new dilemma and opener for another sequel". The Manila Bulletin panned the novel, saying that "plot is an afterthought, while the News de Stars praised the entry as "easy and catchy".

Crescendo was also a Goodreads Choice Award Nominee for Goodreads Author in 2010.
