= Obi-Wan Kenobi =

Star Wars character

- Star Wars character
- Alec Guinness as Obi-Wan Kenobi in Star Wars (1977)
- First appearance: Star Wars: From the Adventures of Luke Skywalker (1976)
- Created by: George Lucas
- Portrayed by: Alec Guinness (Note: Original trilogy); Ewan McGregor (Note: Obi-Wan Kenobi Prequel trilogy)
- Voiced by: Various: Alec Guinness (Note: The Force Awakens The Rise of Skywalker Star Wars Rebels (archival audio) Super Star Wars); Ewan McGregor (Note: The Rise of Skywalker The Force Awakens); Bernard Behrens (Note: Radio dramas); Scott Cleverdon (Note: Various video games); David Ian Davies (Note: Rogue Squadron II: Rogue Leader Galactic Battlegrounds); Michael Donovan (Note: Lego Star Wars: The Yoda Chronicles Lego Star Wars: Droid Tales); Mark Hamill (Note: Family Guy); Nick Jameson (Note: Revenge of the Sith (video game)); Jonathan Love (Note: The Clone Wars (video game)); Lewis Macleod (Note: Various video games); Daran Norris (Note: The Clone Wars (video game)); Timothy Omundson (Note: Rogue Squadron III: Rebel Strike); Rob Rackstraw (Note: The Force Unleashed); David Scott (Note: Lego Star Wars: The Padawan Menace); Stephen Stanton (Note: Various video games Star Wars Rebels); James Arnold Taylor (Note: The Clone Wars (series) The Clone Wars (film) Clone Wars Star Wars Rebels Tales of the Jedi Various video games); Sam Vincent (Note: Lego Star Wars: The Yoda Chronicles Lego Star Wars: Droid Tales); Fred Young (Note: Star Wars (pinball game))

In-universe information
- Alias: Ben Kenobi
- Occupation: Jedi Master
- Affiliation: Jedi Order; Galactic Republic; Rebel Alliance
- Masters: Qui-Gon Jinn; Yoda
- Apprentices: Anakin Skywalker; Luke Skywalker
- Homeworld: Stewjon

Obi-Wan "Ben" Kenobi (/ˈoʊbiːˌwɑːn kəˈnoʊbiː/) is a fictional character in the Star Wars franchise. He was introduced in the original Star Wars film (1977) (Note: The film was later retitled Star Wars: Episode IV—A New Hope.) and its novelization (1976). In Star Wars and its two sequels, Obi-Wan is depicted as a Jedi Master who trains Luke Skywalker in the ways of the Force. In the prequel trilogy, he mentors Luke's father, Anakin Skywalker. Obi-Wan is portrayed by Alec Guinness in the original trilogy and by Ewan McGregor in the prequel films. McGregor also plays the character in the television series Obi-Wan Kenobi (2022). Guinness's performance in Star Wars earned him the Saturn Award for Best Supporting Actor, as well as a nomination for the Academy Award for Best Supporting Actor.

== Creation and development ==
George Lucas, who wrote and directed the original Star Wars film, created Obi-Wan Kenobi as a mentor for Luke. Lucas originally planned for Obi-Wan to continue training Luke in The Empire Strikes Back (1980), the first sequel to Star Wars. Although Obi-Wan's death was not in the final version of the Star Wars script, Lucas decided during filming that Obi-Wan should die. Alec Guinness said he begged Lucas to kill off his character because he hated Obi-Wan's dialogue. Lucas, however, claimed he added Obi-Wan's death because the character served no purpose after his duel with Vader. Lucas later reflected: "It would be much more powerful, satisfying and interesting if Darth Vader were to kill him and he were to go on to a different form."

When outlining The Empire Strikes Back, Lucas decided he wanted Obi-Wan to return as a spirit to continue training Luke. Partly due to Guinness's failing health, Lucas realized that he would also need another mentor character. This new mentor would eventually take the form of Yoda.

A younger version of Obi-Wan appears in the prequel trilogy, which began with The Phantom Menace (1999). Lucas described Obi-Wan's character development in the film: "In the beginning, Obi-Wan is at odds with Qui-Gon, who rebels against the Jedi rules. But by the end of the film, he has become Qui-Gon by taking on his rebellious personality and his responsibilities."

In his book about the Star Wars franchise, Chris Taylor claims that Obi-Wan was inspired by the J.R.R. Tolkien character Gandalf.

== Portrayal ==
When casting Star Wars, Lucas sought an established star for the role of Obi-Wan. He considered Peter Cushing for the part, but decided the actor's lean features would be better employed as the villainous Grand Moff Tarkin. The film's producer, Gary Kurtz, felt a strong character actor was required to convey the "stability and gravitas" of Obi-Wan. Before Guinness was cast, the Japanese actor Toshiro Mifune was considered for the role. Mifune's daughter, Mika Kitagawa, said her father "had a lot of samurai pride" and turned down the roles of both Obi-Wan and Darth Vader because he thought Star Wars would employ cheap special effects and would therefore "cheapen the image of samurai". Once Guinness was selected and production was underway, Lucas credited him with inspiring the cast and crew to work harder, which contributed significantly to the completion of filming. Harrison Ford, who plays Han Solo in the film, said he admired Guinness's preparation, professionalism and kindness towards the other actors.

Ewan McGregor portrays Obi-Wan in the prequel trilogy and in the 2022 miniseries Obi-Wan Kenobi. His performance in the first prequel film, The Phantom Menace (1999), earned him a Saturn Award nomination for Best Actor.

James Arnold Taylor voices Obi-Wan Kenobi in the animated film Star Wars: The Clone Wars (2008) and the subsequent television series, also titled Star Wars: The Clone Wars (2008–2020), as well as in other animated media. (Note: Attributed to multiple references:)

== Appearances ==
=== Original trilogy ===
Obi-Wan is introduced in Star Wars (1977) as an elderly hermit living on Tatooine. When Luke and C-3PO travel the desert in search of the runaway droid R2-D2, Obi-Wan rescues them from Tusken Raiders. At Obi-Wan's home, R2-D2 plays a recording of Princess Leia explaining that R2-D2 contains architectural plans for the Galactic Empire's planet-destroying battle station, the Death Star. Leia asks Obi-Wan to deliver R2-D2 and the plans to Alderaan to aid the Rebel Alliance. Obi-Wan reveals to Luke that he is a Jedi, a peacekeeper from the days of the Republic. He explains that Luke's father was also a Jedi, and was killed by Darth Vader. Obi-Wan gives Luke his father's lightsaber and invites him to come to Alderaan and begin Jedi training. At first Luke declines, but changes his mind after finding that his aunt and uncle have been killed by Imperial stormtroopers.

As Obi-Wan and Luke approach Mos Eisley, Obi-Wan uses a Jedi mind trick to compel Imperial troops to let them through a checkpoint. Obi-Wan and Luke hire the smugglers Han Solo and Chewbacca to take them to Alderaan aboard Han's ship, the Millennium Falcon. During the journey, Obi-Wan instructs Luke in lightsaber combat. Obi-Wan suddenly feels "a great disturbance in the Force"; soon after, he and the others find that the Empire has obliterated Alderaan. The Falcon gets caught in the Death Star's tractor beam, but the group is able to avoid detection and infiltrate the station. Obi-Wan disables the tractor beam, then encounters Vader. They engage in a lightsaber duel as Luke, Leia, Han and Chewbacca escape. Obi-Wan allows Vader to strike him down, then vanishes into the Force. Later, Obi-Wan contacts Luke through the Force and helps him destroy the Death Star.

In The Empire Strikes Back (1980), Obi-Wan appears several times as a Force spirit. On the ice planet Hoth, he instructs Luke to travel to Dagobah to find the exiled Jedi Master Yoda. Yoda is reluctant to mentor Luke, but Obi-Wan convinces him to continue Luke's training. When Luke intends to leave Dagobah to rescue his friends in Cloud City, Obi-Wan beseeches him to stay, but Luke leaves anyway.

In Return of the Jedi (1983), Obi-Wan appears to Luke after Yoda's death on Dagobah. Obi-Wan confirms that Vader is Luke's father, and reveals that Leia is Luke's twin sister. He urges Luke to confront and defeat Vader. After the Rebels destroy the second Death Star and defeat the Empire, Obi-Wan appears at the celebration on Endor alongside the Force spirits of Yoda and Anakin Skywalker.

=== Prequel trilogy ===
A younger Obi-Wan appears in The Phantom Menace (1999), which is set thirty-two years before Star Wars. He is the apprentice of the Jedi Master Qui-Gon Jinn, and accompanies him to negotiations with the Trade Federation, which is blockading the planet Naboo. Obi-Wan and Qui-Gon rescue Naboo's fourteen-year-old queen Padmé Amidala with help from the Gungan Jar Jar Binks, then travel to Coruscant, the capital of the Republic. When they land on Tatooine for repairs, they encounter the nine-year-old slave Anakin Skywalker. Qui-Gon believes the boy is the "Chosen One" of Jedi prophecy, destined to bring balance to the Force. After securing his freedom, Anakin joins the group on their journey. While leaving Tatooine, they are attacked by the Sith Lord Darth Maul. Back on Naboo, they meet Maul again, and engage him in lightsaber combat. Maul mortally wounds Qui-Gon, but Obi-Wan defeats Maul. As Qui-Gon dies, he asks his apprentice to train Anakin as a Jedi, with or without the approval of the Jedi Council. Later, Yoda proclaims Obi-Wan a Jedi Knight and reluctantly allows Anakin to become his Padawan.

Ewan McGregor as Obi-Wan Kenobi in a promotional photo

The second film of the trilogy, Attack of the Clones (2002), takes place ten years later. Anakin has grown powerful but arrogant, and believes that Obi-Wan is holding him back. After they save Padmé from an assassination attempt, Obi-Wan traces the assassins to the planet Kamino. He learns of a massive clone army that is being created for the Republic. The clones are derived from the bounty hunter Jango Fett, and Obi-Wan deduces that he was responsible for the attempt on Padmé's life. Fett escapes to the planet Geonosis with his clone son Boba, unaware that Obi-Wan is pursuing them. On Geonosis, Obi-Wan discovers that a confederacy of star systems is planning to revolt against the Republic. The confederacy is led by the Sith Lord Count Dooku, the former Jedi Master of Qui-Gon. Obi-Wan is captured and sentenced to death by Dooku, but Yoda and Mace Windu arrive with an army and prevent the execution. Obi-Wan and Anakin confront Dooku, but he overpowers them both. Yoda saves their lives, but Dooku escapes.

Revenge of the Sith (2005) is set three years later. Obi-Wan is now a Jedi Master, a member of the Jedi Council, and a general. Obi-Wan and Anakin embark on a rescue mission to save the kidnapped Chancellor Palpatine from the cyborg Separatist commander General Grievous. Dooku duels the Jedi once again, knocking Obi-Wan unconscious. Anakin then defeats Dooku and executes him on Palpatine's orders. After locating Grievous on the planet Utapau, Obi-Wan kills him. The Sith Lord Darth Sidious— who is revealed to be Palpatine—issues Order 66, which compels the clone troopers to betray and kill the Jedi. Obi-Wan and Yoda find that all the Jedi in the Jedi Temple have been slaughtered, including the children. After Obi-Wan warns all surviving Jedi to go into exile, he discovers it was Anakin, now Sidious' apprentice Darth Vader, who led the massacre.

Obi-Wan visits Padmé to ascertain Anakin's whereabouts, and realizes that Anakin is her husband and the father of her unborn child. When Padmé travels to the volcanic planet Mustafar to confront her husband herself, Obi-Wan stows away aboard her ship. Once on Mustafar, Obi-Wan confronts Vader, who accuses him and Padmé of conspiring against him. After Vader uses the Force to strangle Padmé into unconsciousness, Obi-Wan engages him in a ferocious lightsaber duel, which ends with Obi-Wan cutting off several of his limbs. Obi-Wan leaves Vader burning to death, unaware that he will be rescued by Sidious moments later and eventually turned into a cyborg. Obi-Wan takes Padmé to the asteroid Polis Massa, where she dies after giving birth to the twins Luke and Leia. He assists in hiding the children from the newly created Empire: Leia is adopted by Senator Bail Organa of Alderaan, while Obi-Wan delivers Luke to Anakin's stepbrother Owen Lars and his wife Beru on Tatooine. Obi-Wan then goes into exile on Tatooine, where he can watch over Luke.

=== Sequel trilogy ===
In The Force Awakens (2015), Rey hears Obi-Wan's voice during a Force vision. During her battle against the resurrected Darth Sidious in The Rise of Skywalker (2019), she hears the voices of various deceased Jedi, including Obi-Wan. He says, "These are your final steps, Rey. Rise and take them." The voices of both McGregor and Guinness were used in both films.

=== Television ===
==== The Clone Wars ====
Obi-Wan appears in the animated series The Clone Wars (2008–2014, 2020). He is a general during the Clone Wars, and he and Anakin have many adventures fighting the Separatists. During this time Obi-Wan's diplomatic skills earn him the appellation "The Negotiator" due to his reputation for preventing and stopping battles without the use of weapons. The series highlights his numerous confrontations with General Grievous, his adversarial relationship with the Dark Jedi Asajj Ventress, his romance with Duchess Satine Kryze, and the return of his old enemy Darth Maul.

==== Star Wars Rebels ====
The animated series Star Wars Rebels (2014–2018) takes place five years before Star Wars. In the season 3 episode "Visions and Voices", Ezra Bridger (voiced by Taylor Gray) discovers that Obi-Wan is alive on Tatooine; Obi-Wan's old nemesis Darth Maul finds him as well. In the episode "Twin Suns", Obi-Wan finds Ezra while he is lost in the desert while letting him know Maul was intending to use him. At that moment, Maul attacks them, and Obi-Wan ushers Ezra to retreat. Obi-Wan mortally wounds Maul during a final lightsaber duel; with his dying breath, Maul asks Obi-Wan if he is protecting the "Chosen One", and Obi-Wan replies that he is. After Maul's death, Obi-Wan is seen watching over Luke Skywalker from a distance.

In Rebels, Obi-Wan was voiced by Stephen Stanton, who replaced James Arnold Taylor. Rebels creator Dave Filoni, who worked with the character during the full duration of Star Wars: The Clone Wars, said he considered asking McGregor to reprise and voice the role. However, a voice recording of the late Alec Guinness as Obi-Wan Kenobi was used in a 2018 episode.

==== Obi-Wan Kenobi ====
The 2022 live-action series Obi-Wan Kenobi takes place ten years after the events of Revenge of the Sith. It was originally conceived as a standalone film, but was cancelled during pre-production following the box office disappointment of the 2018 film Solo: A Star Wars Story. At the beginning of the series, Obi-Wan is living in hiding on Tatooine and watching over the ten-year-old Luke. He has lost his connection to the Force, cannot communicate with the spirit of Qui-Gon, and experiences nightmares from his past. Unbeknownst to Obi-Wan, Anakin survived their duel on Mustafar and is now hunting Jedi as Darth Vader. Reva Sevander, one of the Empire's Inquisitors, is obsessed with finding Obi-Wan, who is widely believed to be dead. In an attempt to lure him, she kidnaps Luke's twin sister, Princess Leia. Obi-Wan agrees to rescue Leia after her adoptive father, Bail Organa, visits his home.

After tracking Leia's kidnappers to the planet Daiyu, Obi-Wan encounters the con artist Haja Estree, who directs Obi-Wan to Leia's location. Obi-Wan liberates the young princess, but is unable to flee the planet before the Inquisitors detect his presence. Reva locates him and Leia, and reveals that Anakin is still alive as Vader. When Reva's superior, the Grand Inquisitor, arrives to arrest Obi-Wan, Reva stabs him with her lightsaber. Obi-Wan and Leia then escape to the mining planet Mapuzo, where they are discovered by Imperial troops. They elude their enemies with help from Tala, an Imperial officer who is secretly a member of the Path, an organization that aids those hunted by the Empire. As she escorts them to a hidden passageway, Vader arrives and begins harming innocent bystanders, hoping to bait Obi-Wan into revealing himself. Obi-Wan duels with Vader, who overpowers him. Tala saves Obi-Wan, but Leia is captured again by Reva.

Obi-Wan and Tala rescue Leia from the Inquisitors' stronghold, escaping with the help of Tala's Path allies. Reva leads a siege on the Path facility, and Obi-Wan speaks with her to stall for time. He deduces that she was a Jedi youngling who survived Vader's massacre at the Jedi Temple, and now wants to kill him for revenge. He suggests that she can attack him when he arrives. As the Path members evacuate, Reva tries to assault Vader but is quickly overpowered and left for dead. She manages to survive, however, and finds a message on Obi-Wan's transmitter that reveals Luke's location on Tatooine. Vader pursues the ship carrying the Path members and Obi-Wan, who decides to lure Vader away and confront him on a nearby planet. As they duel, Obi-Wan regains his connection to the Force and realizes Anakin has completely embraced his identity as Vader. Obi-Wan wounds his former apprentice and leaves him incapacitated. On Tatooine, Reva pursues Luke into the desert. Remembering the massacre at the Temple, she is unable to kill the boy, and returns him to his family. Obi-Wan arrives and congratulates her for overcoming her trauma and liberating herself. In the final moments of the series, Obi-Wan finally manages to converse with Qui-Gon.

=== Novels and comics ===
Obi-Wan appears briefly in the 2015 novel Dark Disciple, which is based on unfinished episodes from The Clone Wars. It provides details about the friendship between Obi-Wan and the rogue Jedi Quinlan Vos. In the 2015 Star Wars comic series, Luke goes to Obi-Wan's abandoned house on Tatooine and finds his diary, in which Obi-Wan has written stories from his past. The 2016 Marvel Comics mini-series Obi-Wan and Anakin focuses on the two Jedi between The Phantom Menace and Attack of the Clones.

Obi-Wan appears in the 2019 novel Master and Apprentice, which explores his relationship with Qui-Gon prior to the events of The Phantom Menace. He is also featured in two 2022 novels: Brotherhood, which is set at the beginning of the Clone Wars, and Star Wars Padawan, which recounts his early years as an apprentice.

== Star Wars Legends ==
Following the acquisition of Lucasfilm by The Walt Disney Company in 2012, most of the licensed Star Wars novels and comics produced between 1977 and 2014 were rebranded as Star Wars Legends and declared non-canon to the franchise. The Legends works comprise a separate narrative universe. (Note: Attributed to multiple references:)

=== Novels ===
Obi-Wan's life prior to The Phantom Menace is portrayed mostly in Jude Watson's Jedi Apprentice series, which follows his adventures as Qui-Gon's apprentice. Notable events in the series include his battle with the Dark Jedi Xanatos and his first independent mission. Watson's Jedi Quest series details his adventures with Anakin in the years leading up to Attack of the Clones. His heroism just before and during the Clone Wars is portrayed in novels such as Outbound Flight, The Approaching Storm, and The Cestus Deception. Obi-Wan's life between Revenge of the Sith and Star Wars is depicted in The Last of the Jedi series. Set roughly a year after the fall of the Republic, the series follows Obi-Wan as he seeks out possible survivors of the Great Jedi Purge, including Anakin's former rival, Ferus Olin. The novels also depict Obi-Wan adjusting to life as a hermit on Tatooine while watching over Luke. He discovers that Vader is still alive after seeing him on the Holonet, the galaxy's official news source.

Obi-Wan appears in the final chapter of Dark Lord: The Rise of Darth Vader, which takes place just after Revenge of the Sith. He learns with alarm that Vader survived their duel on Mustafar, but Qui-Gon assures him that Vader will not set foot on Tatooine for fear of reawakening Anakin Skywalker. Qui-Gon advises him not to reveal to Luke his true parentage until the time is right. In various novels set after Return of the Jedi, Obi-Wan appears as a Force spirit. In The Truce at Bakura, he warns Luke about the Ssi-ruuk; in The Lost City of the Jedi, he guides him to the eponymous city on Yavin 4; in Heir to the Empire, he bids farewell to Luke, explaining that he must abandon his spiritual form and ascend to a higher plane of consciousness. Before parting, Luke says that Obi-Wan was like a father to him, and Obi-Wan replies that he loved Luke like a son. The novel Kenobi (2013) tells the story of Obi-Wan's first days of exile on Tatooine.

=== Comics ===
Issue #24 of Marvel's 1977 Star Wars comic follows Obi-Wan during the Republic era. He is featured in various Dark Horse Comics publications, including several set during the Clone Wars. In Star Wars: Republic (1998–2006), Obi-Wan fights the Separatists, is tortured by Asajj Ventress before being rescued by Anakin, and apprehends the corrupt Jedi Master Quinlan Vos. Throughout the series, he grows increasingly wary of Palpatine's designs on the Republic and his influence on Anakin. In the Star Wars: Visionaries story "Old Wounds" (2005), Obi-Wan confronts Darth Maul on Tatooine during Luke's childhood. Owen Lars shoots and kills Maul, then warns Obi-Wan to stay away from Luke. Through the Force, Obi-Wan reassures Luke that he will be there for him when needed.

=== Clone Wars ===
Obi-Wan appears in the animated micro-series Clone Wars, which aired on Cartoon Network from 2003 to 2005.

== Cultural impact ==
Guinness was nominated for the Academy Award for Best Supporting Actor for his portrayal of Obi-Wan Kenobi in Star Wars. In 2003, the American Film Institute selected Obi-Wan as the 37th-greatest movie hero of all time. He was listed as the third-greatest Star Wars character by IGN, and was chosen as one of UGO Networks' favorite heroes of all time.

In 2005, a street in the Polish village Grabowiec was given the name Ulica Obi-Wana Kenobiego, which translates as "Obi-Wan Kenobi Street".
