= Hush, Hush =

2009 novel by Becca Fitzpatrick

- Front cover of Hush, Hush
- Author: Becca Fitzpatrick
- Original title: Hush, Hush
- Translator: none
- Illustrator: none
- Cover artist: Lucy Ruth Cummins (design); James Porto (photograph)
- Language: English
- Series: Hush, Hush series
- Subject: The two worlds of Patch and Nora
- Genre: Young adult, fantasy, romance
- Published: October 13, 2009 Simon & Schuster
- Publication place: United States
- Media type: Print (hardcover) e-Book (Kindle); Audio book (CD)
- Pages: 391
- ISBN: 978-1-4169-8941-7
- Followed by: Crescendo (2010)

Hush, Hush is a 2009 New York Times bestselling young adult paranormal romance novel by Becca Fitzpatrick and the first book in the Hush, Hush series. The novel focuses on Nora Grey, a teenager whose life is at risk after beginning a romance with new student Patch Cipriano, a fallen angel with a dark connection to Nora.

The novel received enthusiastic reviews and book rights to Hush, Hush have been sold to over 13 countries, with LD Entertainment purchasing film rights.

== Plot ==
Nora Grey is a sixteen year old student living in Coldwater, Maine. Outside of the tragedy of her father's recent murder, her life is largely uneventful until she is seated next to Patch Cipriano in biology class. Patch takes interest in her, and knows personal details about Nora's life which sets her on edge. Nora finds herself inexplicably drawn to him, despite feeling a lingering sense of danger in his presence.

Nora's life soon takes a more mysterious, dangerous turn. She senses she is being followed, and one night is attacked while driving. Yet when Nora tries to show her friend Vee the damage, the car had returned to its previous good condition, leading her to fear she may be losing her sanity. A similar incident happens at Delphic amusement park where Nora strongly sees and feels herself falling from a roller coaster she rides with Patch, only to later realize nothing happened and she had merely imagined it. Overtime, her feelings for Patch grow stronger and they become increasingly connected. Meanwhile, she becomes more suspicious of her friend Elliot after discovering his involvement in a murder case in his last school. Her old school psychologist gets replaced by Miss Greene, who warns Nora to stay away from Patch, despite Nora not previously mentioning Patch to her.

When Nora goes to Portland to investigate Elliott's murder, a woman giving her directions gets shot in front of her. Terrified, she calls Patch for a ride home. Nora then finds that Patch has a V-shaped scar on his back, which she touches, leading her to get pulled into memories of his past. The memories reveal that Patch is a fallen angel from Heaven who was trying to kill her in order to gain a human body, an idea which he heard comes from the book of Enoch. Her death would kill his nephilim vassal Chauncey Langeais and make Patch completely human. She also discovers that her psychologist Miss Greene is an angel named Dabria and Patch's former lover, who wants him to save Nora's life so he can become a guardian angel. Patch had initially rejected Dabria's idea out of a desire to become human, but the plan failed because he had fallen in love with Nora. Patch reveals that he had initially wanted to become human after lusting for an unnamed human woman, but she got old and died before Patch could meet her.

Later Dabria breaks into Nora's room and tries to kill Nora in order to prevent Patch from doing so and becoming human. Nora is narrowly saved by Patch, who strips Dabria's wings, knowing the archangels would have done the same for trying to kill Nora. It is soon revealed that Nora's friend Jules is actually Chauncey, who wants revenge on Patch for making him swear an oath that allows Patch to take over his body during Cheshvan. Nora gets invited to a game of hide-and-seek by Elliott, who hints that Vee will not survive the game if Nora doesn't participate. Jules corners her during the game and confesses that he was behind the various attacks on her life, motivated by getting venegance on Patch as Patch cannot feel any physical pain, leading Chauncey trying to break him emotionally. The game continues and she is held at gunpoint by Chauncey in front of Patch.

Patch is forced to possess Nora's body to fight Chauncey. Nora climbs to the rafters of the school gym to escape, but Jules uses mind tricks to make her believe that the ladders are breaking and that she will fall to her death. Patch breaks through the tricks by making her focus on his voice in her mind. Nora then confronts Jules with the knowledge that if she were to sacrifice her life, Patch would become human and Jules would die. Nora throws herself from the rafters, which effectively kills Jules, as he did not have a soul to reanimate his body when Nora's consciousness returned.

To her surprise, Nora wakes up alive and well. Patch explains that he did not take her sacrifice because there was no point in having a human body without her. In doing so, Patch has saved Nora's life and is now her guardian angel. The two share a romantic moment, ending the book.

== Characters ==
Nora Grey

Nora Grey is the main protagonist of the novel. Described as having reddish brown hair, long legs, and smoky grey eyes, Nora lives with her mother in a farmhouse in Coldwater, Maine, and attends Coldwater High School with her best friend Vee Sky. She is studious, diligent and initially less interested in romance than her peers. Her father, Harrison Grey, was murdered a year ago. She meets Patch when her biology teacher decides to have a new seat arrangement and he becomes her new biology partner. At first, she is reluctant to have Patch as her partner but eventually becomes intrigued by him. Jules and Patch mention several times that she has a "weak mind"; this doesn't mean that she's weak-willed, but that it's extremely difficult for her to block out mind controllers.

Patch Cipriano

Patch Cipriano is Nora's love interest and a fallen angel. He is described as having black hair, black eyes, and a mediterranean complexion. He spends his leisure time playing pool at Bo's Arcade. His main desire before meeting Nora was to become human. His sly mysterious nature leaves Nora agitated yet intrigued. He uses his charisma to his advantage, particularly with avoiding Nora's questions about him, though he gradually opens up more to her as the novel progresses. After failing to take control of a human body, the avenging angels ripped Patch's wings off on his way back to heaven. He cannot feel physically — it is described as experiencing the world through a pane of glass — but he can experience emotions. When he is restored as a guardian angel, he regains the ability to fly, though he still cannot feel. Later in the story his real name is revealed to be Jev.

Vee Sky

Vee is Nora's best friend since childhood. Vee is described as a "green-eyed, minky blonde, and a few pounds over curvy" and is slightly taller than Nora. She is light hearted, outgoing and flirtatious, in contrast to Nora's serious studious personality. She is attacked by a man in a ski mask, later revealed to be Dabria. After the attack, she shows an extreme distrust in Patch, mistaking him for the attacker.

Elliot Saunders

Elliot is a new student at Coldwater High, having transferred from Kinghorn Prep. He is described as having shaggy blonde hair and blue eyes. He first meets Nora and Vee at a cafe. While initially flirtatious and exceedingly friendly with Nora, Nora's opinion of him sours with suspcion when she learns he was suspected in a murder case at his former school. It is later revealed that Jules was the benefactor behind his scholarship at Kinghorn. Jules tested Elliot's loyalty to him by making him choose between his lover and his education, and Elliot ultimately gave in to Jules. Jules uses him as a pawn for his plan to get revenge on Patch by killing Nora. After being incapacitated by Jules in the school library while luring Nora into the trap, he is saved from dying after Vee calls the police.

Jules/Chauncey Langeais

Jules is 6'10 with shoulder-length blond hair. Initially introdfuced as an aloof acquaintance of Nora's, he is revealed in the later part of the book to be Patch's vassal, Chauncey, who wants to have revenge on the fallen angel for tricking him into swearing an oath that will allow Patch to take control over his body for two weeks during the hebrew month of Cheshvan. He inherited the power to create illusions from his father, using it to frighten Nora numerous times. He also uses Elliot as his pawn in his plan to hurt Patch. As a Nephilim, he is killed when Nora sacrificed herself by jumping off of the rafters. Patch explains that when Nora came back, Chauncey didn't have a soul to reanimate his body, successfully killing him for good. He is related to Nora through her father.

Marcie Millar

Marcie is an attractive popular girl at Coldwater High and a minor antagonist in Hush, Hush. She is described as having strawberry blonde hair and wearing heavy foundation to conceal her freckles, often wearing skimpy outfits. She is the only sophomore to make varsity cheerleading in the history of her school. Marcie and Nora have hated each other since middle school, when Marcie publicly displayed Nora's underwear and spray-painted 'whore' on her locker. In addition to her hatred of Nora, she also constantly insults and taunts Vee about her weight. It is implied Marcie has a history of anorexia, as Marcie replies: "old news, at least I know how to exercise a little self control" when Nora calls her an 'anorexic pig'. She is attacked by Jules after having a verbal fight with Nora in the school library. The reasons for her hatred of Nora are unknown. Her dad is the owner of Coldwater's Toyota dealership and she lives in an affluent neighborhood.

Miss Greene/Dabria

Dabria is an Angel of Death and Patch's former lover. She is described as having pale skin, blue eyes, long blonde hair, an oval face and a willowy but feminine figure. She comes down to earth because she wants Patch to save Nora's life so he can become a guardian angel so he can gain his wings again. On earth, she becomes the new psychologist at Coldwater High to get closer to Nora and Patch. She feels heartbroken and disgusted that Patch abandoned her for a human woman, seeing humans as selfish and slovenly. After her warnings for Nora to stay away from Patch fail, she attempts to kill Nora to get him back, but is unsuccessful. Due to these deeds, she begins to fall, and Patch speeds up the process by ripping her already weakened wings off.

== Development ==
Fitzpatrick said that Patch was the first character she knew would be in the story, and that many of the early drafts of Hush, Hush revolved around him. According to Fitzpatrick, there was a boy she knew in high school who she used as a framework to build Patch's character. The boy was "cool, quiet, mysterious" and she felt drawn to him, despite never knowing him well. Fitzpatrick also said that the biggest obstacle to getting Hush, Hush published was that the original drafts weren't good enough. She had first started sending drafts in 2002 and after revising the book for five years, she finally started receiving publishing offers in 2008.

Patch being a fallen angel was not something Fitzpatrick had initially planned when she started writing. While she did know that she wanted Patch to be a bad boy archetype, it wasn't until multiple revisions and wanting Patch to have had a fall from grace in his backstory that she decided Patch would be a fallen angel. She also stated that in early drafts, Nora was a much more arrogant character she found too similar to Patch, and it took multiple rewrites to get her characterization to her liking.

== Sequels ==
Hush, Hush was followed by three books, Crescendo, Silence and Finale. The novels were released consecutively each year, with Finale being announced as the final book in the series. The series was initially promoted as being a trilogy, but it was later announced that the series would comprise four books, thus being a tetralogy.

== Adaptations ==
=== Film adaptation ===
On December 4, 2012 Entertainment Weekly revealed that the entire Hush, Hush series had been optioned by LD Entertainment as producer and distributor Paramount Pictures. LD Entertainment announced that they would be turning the books into a film series, with Greek creator Patrick Sean Smith set to write the screenplay for the first installment.

On July 8, 2014, Becca announced on her website that she has decided that now is not the right time to move forward with the Hush, Hush movie and did not renew the movie option with LD Entertainment.

On July 20, 2018, Becca posted an update stating that a Hush Hush movie would be headed to production 'very soon'. Liana Liberato was cast as Nora and Wolfgang Novogratz as Patch. BCDF Pictures, along with Kalahari Film & Media, announced that Kellie Cyrus would be directing the film - who is best known for directing The Vampire Diaries and The Originals, as well as an episode of the drama You from Greg Berlanti and Sera Gamble.

On July 13, 2021, Becca announced that Hush, Hush had been greenlit for a film by SpringHill Company and Genius Entertainment Partner. There have been no further updates since the announcement.

=== Graphic novel ===
In 2011 Sea Lion Books published the first volume in a proposed three-volume adaptation of Hush, Hush, the first book in the series. Artist Jennyson Rosero was stated to be drawing the series, with Fitzpatrick and Rosero using Fitzpatrick's blog to receive reader advice and criticism from preliminary sketches.
