= Michelle Zink =

American author

Michelle Zink is an American author. She is known for her gothic fantasy series, Prophecy of the Sisters and A Temptation of Angels. Prophecy of the Sisters was named both to Booklist's Top 10 First Novels for Youth, and the Autumn 2009 Indie Next List. She has also worked with Freeform on several book/TV companion projects, including Once Upon a Time: Henry and Violet, part of Once Upon a Time's official canon. Other works may be found under the names Michelle St. James and Sadie Hunt.

Since 2016, Michelle has become an advocate for indie publishing, mentoring and coaching traditionally published authors.

== Books ==
Zink's debut novel Prophecy of the Sisters is set in 19th-century New York. It was reviewed in The Guardian as having a "page-turning plot" and marketed for a young adults. Publishers Weekly said it is a "tragedy immersed in a world of spells, Samhain and twisting family allegiances". Kirkus Reviews noted "this tale is extremely dark".

== Works ==
Prophecy of the Sisters trilogy

- (2009). Prophecy of the Sisters, Little, Brown Books for Young Readers, 352 pages. ISBN 978-0316027427
- (2010). Guardian of the Gate, Little, Brown Books for Young Readers, 352 pages. ISBN 978-0316034470
- (2011). Circle of Fire, Little, Brown Books for Young Readers, 362 pages. ISBN 978-0316034463

A Temptation of Angels

- (2012). A Temptation of Angels, Dial Books for Young Readers, 435 pages. ISBN 978-0803737266

This Wicked Game

- (2013). This Wicked Game, Dial Books for Young Readers, 388 pages. ISBN 978-0803737747

Lies I Told

- (2015). Lies I Told, HarperTeen, 355 pages. ISBN 978-0062327130

Promises I Made

- (2015).Promises I Made, HarperTeen, 304 pages. ISBN 978-0062327154

A Walk in the Sun

- (2016).A Walk in the Sun, HarperTeen, 336 pages. ISBN 978-0062434463

Once Upon a Time: Henry and Violet

- (2018).Once Upon a Time, Kingswell Teen, 368 pages. ISBN 978-1368023702
