= Karen Lynch (author) =

Canadian author (born 1967)

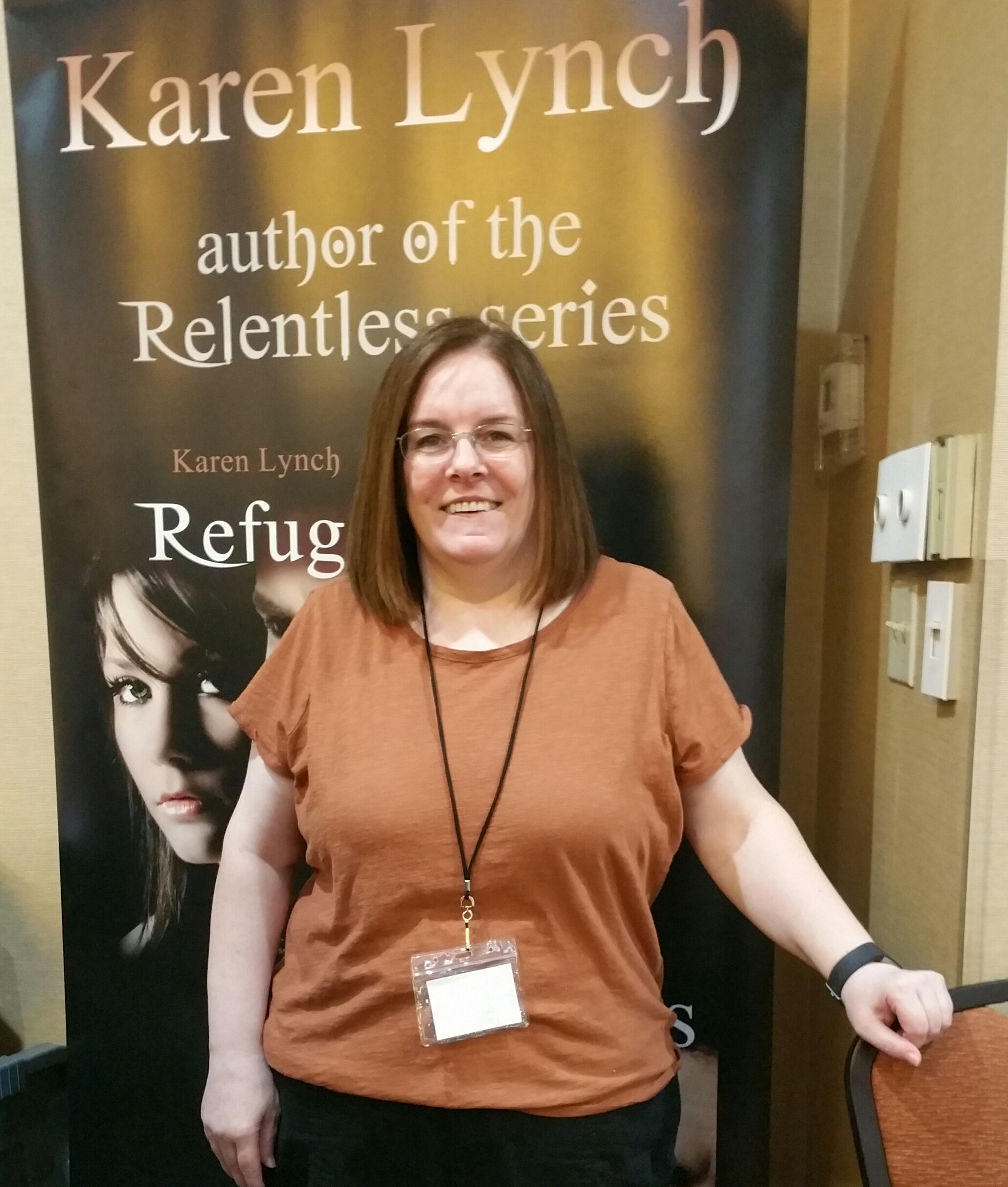
- Lynch in 2017
- Born: July 25, 1967 (age 59); Newfoundland, Canada
- Occupation: Author
- Writing career
- Genres: Fantasy, young adult fiction, young adult romance literature
- Notable work: Relentless series
- Website: www.karenlynchnl.com

Karen Lynch (born July 25, 1967) is a New York Times and USA Today bestselling author of young adult urban fantasy novels.

== Publications ==
=== Relentless series ===
- Relentless (December 26, 2013; ISBN 978-0692516799)
- Refuge (December 9, 2014)
- Rogue (October 27, 2015)
- Warrior (October 25, 2016)
- Haven (May 2, 2017)
- Fated (February 13, 2018)
- Hellion (January 8, 2019)
- Tempest (March 5, 2024)

=== Fae Games series ===
- Pawn (May 26, 2020)
- Knight (January 5, 2021)
- Queen (February 22, 2022)

Kalyx (July 22, 2025)
