= Jude Watson =

American author

Jude Watson JR
- Writing career
- Pen name: Jude Watson
- Notable work: What I Saw and How I Lied
- Notable awards: National Book Award for Young People's Literature

Judy Blundell, pseudonym Jude Watson, is an American author of books for middle grade, young adult, and adult readers. She won the annual National Book Award for Young People's Literature in 2008 for the young adult novel What I Saw and How I Lied, published under her real name by Scholastic Books.

== Life ==
Blundell is better known as Jude Watson, an author of books set in the Star Wars universe. Her publisher, Scholastic, calls her "the most celebrated author in the prequel-era of the Star Wars phenomenon" (that is, Star Wars fiction set in the time frame of the three prequel movies).

Writing for the Star Wars franchise, she worked with editors from LucasBooks as well as Scholastic. Her debut came when LucasBooks recruited her to write the Star Wars Journal Captive to Evil by Princess Leia Organa, published by Scholastic in 1998.

Beside the journals of Princess Leia, Queen Amidala (1999), and Darth Maul (1999), Watson is the author of three series that comprise about forty books: Jedi Apprentice (except for the first book), Jedi Quest, and The Last of the Jedi. She is also a co-author with K. D. Burkett in the Star Wars: Science Adventures series. Scholastic says that the primary audience is children age 9 to 14.

Her other books include the romance series Brides of Wildcat County, the parapsychic science fiction works Premonitions and Disappearance, and three books in the 39 Clues mystery-adventure series, all written for young adults. In 2018 she published the book A Warp in Time.

== Family ==
Blundell lives in a small village called Stony Brook, on Long Island, with her daughter and husband. Her husband, Neil Watson, is the executive director of the Long Island Museum of American Art, History, and Carriages.

== Non-Star Wars Bibliography ==
- What I Saw and How I Lied (2008), as Judy Blundell, her real name — winner of the National Book Award
- Strings Attached (2011), as Judy Blundell
- The High Season (2018), as Judy Blundell

=== Brides of Wildcat County ===
- Dangerous: Savannah's Story (1995)
- Scandalous: Eden's Story (1995)
- Audacious: Ivy's Story (1995)
- Impetuous: Mattie's Story (1996)
- Tempestuous: Opal's Story (1996)

=== The Sight ===
- Premonitions (2004)
- Disappearance (2005)

=== The 39 Clues ===
==== The Clue Hunt ====
- Beyond the Grave (Book 4 - 2009)
- In Too Deep (Book 6 - 2009)
- Vespers Rising (Book 11 - 2011)

==== Cahills vs. Vespers ====
- A King's Ransom (Book 2 - 2011)

==== Unstoppable ====
- Nowhere to Run (Book 1 - 2013)

==== Doublecross ====
- Mission Titanic (Book 1 - 2015)

=== Loot ===
- Loot: How to Steal a Fortune (2014)
- Sting: It Takes a Crook to Catch a Crook (2016)

== Star Wars Bibliography ==
About the franchise see Star Wars and List of Star Wars books

=== Star Wars Journals ===
- Star Wars Journal: Captive to Evil by Princess Leia Organa (1998) — Blundell's first Star Wars gig
- Star Wars Episode I Journal: Queen Amidala (1999)
- Star Wars Episode I Journal: Darth Maul (2000)

=== Star Wars: Science Adventures ===
- Emergency in Escape Pod Four, by Jude Watson and K. D. Burkett (1999)
- Journey across Planet X, by Watson and Burkett (1999)

=== Short stories ===
- Storm Fleet Warnings (2003)
- Ghosts of the Sith (2006)
- The Last One Standing (2006)

=== Legacy of the Jedi ===
(88.5 BBY – 20 BBY (Before the Battle of Yavin))

- Legacy of the Jedi (2003)
- Secrets of the Jedi (2005)

=== Jedi Apprentice ===
(44 BBY – 38 BBY)

- The Dark Rival (1999)
- The Hidden Past (1999)
- The Mark of the Crown (1999)
- The Defenders of the Dead (1999)
- The Uncertain Path (2000)
- The Captive Temple (2000)
- The Day of Reckoning (2000)
- The Fight for Truth (2000)
- The Shattered Peace (2000)
- The Deadly Hunter (2000)
- The Evil Experiment (2001)
- The Dangerous Rescue (2001)
- Special Edition #1: Deceptions (2001)
- The Ties That Bind (2001)
- The Death of Hope (2001)
- The Call to Vengeance (2001)
- The Only Witness (2002)
- The Threat Within (2002)
- Special Edition #2: The Followers (2002)

=== Jedi Quest ===
Watson explores "through Jedi Master Obi-Wan Kenobi and his apprentice Anakin Skywalker"
(28 BBY – 25 BBY)

- Path to Truth (2001) 25 BBY
- The Way of the Apprentice (2002)
- The Trail of the Jedi (2002)
- The Dangerous Games (2002)
- The Master of Disguise (2002)
- The School of Fear (2003)
- The Shadow Trap (2003)
- The Moment of Truth (2003)
- The Changing of the Guard (2004)
- The False Peace (2004)
- The Final Showdown (2004)

=== The Last of the Jedi ===
(18 BBY – 10 BBY)

- The Desperate Mission (2005)
- Dark Warning (2005)
- Underworld (2005)
- Death on Naboo (2006)
- A Tangled Web (2006)
- Return of the Dark Side (2006)
- Secret Weapon (2007)
- Against the Empire (2007)
- Master of Deception (2008)
- Reckoning (2008)
