= Ian Abercrombie =

British actor (1934–2012)

- Abercrombie in 2008
- Born: 11 September 1934; Grays, Essex, England
- Died: 26 January 2012 (aged 77); Los Angeles, California, U.S.
- Occupation: Actor
- Years active: 1951–2012
- Spouses: Elizabeth Romano (m. 1956; div. 1978) Gladys Abercrombie (m. 1984)

Ian Abercrombie (11 September 1934 – 26 January 2012) was an English actor. He was best known for playing Elaine's boss during the sixth season of Seinfeld. He also played Alfred Pennyworth on Birds of Prey, Rupert Cavanaugh (Ian Hainsworth's butler) in Desperate Housewives, Professor Crumbs in Wizards of Waverly Place, and Palpatine in Star Wars: The Clone Wars.

== Early life ==
Ian Abercrombie was born on 11 September 1934 in Grays, Essex, England. He began his career as a dancer during the Second World War. After his footwork years during which he earned bronze, silver and gold medals in stage dancing, he performed in London, Scotland, Ireland, and the Netherlands. He moved to the United States at age 17.

He made his American stage debut in 1951 in a production of Stalag 17 with Jason Robards and Jules Munshin. Many plays in summer stock, regional, and off-Broadway followed in a variety of theatrical offerings, from revues to Shakespeare (in a particularly low period, he worked as a magician's assistant for $10 a performance).

In 1957, he was drafted into the United States Army and stationed in West Germany as part of Special Services, where he directed the continental premiere of Separate Tables.

In the United States, he went to California for a backers' audition, which went nowhere, but he began a long film and television career. He received awards for his work in Sweet Prince with Keir Dullea; Teeth 'N'smiles; A Doll's House with Linda Purl; and The Arcata Promise, opposite Anthony Hopkins. He received acclaim for the one-man show Jean Cocteau—A Mirror Image.

== Career ==
Abercrombie was known to cult film audiences as Wiseman in the comedy horror film Army of Darkness (1992). He guest-starred on many television series such as Seinfeld, The Nanny, Wizards of Waverly Place, Airwolf, Babylon 5, Barnaby Jones and NewsRadio.

On radio, he was heard in several productions of the Hollywood Theater of the Ear. Abercrombie voiced Ambrose in Oscar winner Rango (2011). He also portrayed Ganthet on Green Lantern: The Animated Series, completing his work as the character shortly before his death.

=== Star Wars: The Clone Wars ===
Abercrombie voiced Chancellor Palpatine/Darth Sidious in the 2008 film The Clone Wars, the television continuation, and two spin-off video games (Star Wars: The Clone Wars: Republic Heroes and Star Wars: The Clone Wars: Lightsaber Duels). Supervising director Dave Filoni said that Abercrombie was very excited that Darth Sidious finally was going to be seen in person and not as a hologram anymore. During Celebration VI, Filoni mentioned that before his death, Abercrombie recorded for most of season five as the character, but did not finish, so actor Tim Curry was brought in to voice Palpatine. Abercrombie also voiced the character in the Clovis story arc of the Lost Missions (season six), since it was originally a part of the season four, and later the season five, line-up. This was his final released work, shown in 2014.

== Personal life ==
In 1956, Abercrombie was married to Elizabeth Romano and they divorced in 1978 after 22 years of marriage. In 1984, he was married to Gladys Abercrombie until his death in 2012.

== Death ==
Abercrombie died from kidney failure in Los Angeles, California at Cedars-Sinai Medical Center on 26 January 2012, twenty days after the Wizards of Waverly Place finale. He was 77. He had recently been diagnosed with lymphoma.

Star Wars Celebration VI included the panel "Vocal Stars of The Clone Wars", hosted by James Arnold Taylor and featuring cast members Matt Lanter, Ashley Eckstein, Dee Bradley Baker and Tom Kane, who all dedicated the panel to Abercrombie. Additionally, The Clone Wars episode "The Lawless" includes a dedication to Abercrombie in the opening titles.

== Filmography ==
=== Film ===
Year	Title	Role	Notes
1965	Von Ryan's Express	English POW	Uncredited
1968	Star!	Man in Brixton Music Hall	Uncredited
1969	They Shoot Horses, Don't They?	Male Dancer #74	Uncredited
1970	The Molly Maguires	Stock Actor	Uncredited
1973	Wicked, Wicked	Eddie the Room Service Waiter	Uncredited
1974	Young Frankenstein	Second Villager	Uncredited
1974	The Island at the Top of the World	Train Conductor	Uncredited
1977	Sextette	Rex Ambrose	
1979	The Prisoner of Zenda	Johann	
1980	The Happy Hooker Goes Hollywood	Denis	
1980	Blood Beach	Man in Mayor's Office	
1981	Getting Even	Mr. Kenwood	
1983	Flicks	Inspector	Segment: "Whodunit"
1984	The Ice Pirates	Hymie	
1986	Last Resort	Maître d'	
1986	Firewalker	Boggs	
1988	Catacombs	Brother Orsini	
1989	Warlock	Magistrate #1	
1990	Repossessed	Iced Tea Waiter	Uncredited
1991	Zandalee	Louis Medina	
1991	Puppet Master III	Dr. Hess	
1991	Rolling Thunder		
1992	The Public Eye	Mr. Brown	
1992	Army of Darkness	Wise Man	
1993	Grief	Stanley	
1993	Time Babes	Professor Doran	
1993	Addams Family Values	Driver	
1994	Clean Slate	Leader	
1995	Pocahontas	Additional voices	Uncredited
1997	The Lost World: Jurassic Park	Butler	
1997	Mouse Hunt	Auctioneer	
1997	Johnny Mysto: Boy Wizard	Merlin	Direct-to-video
1999	Wild Wild West	British Dignitary	
2000	Jack Frost 2: Revenge of the Mutant Killer Snowman	Psychiatrist	Direct-to-video; Credited as Ian Ambercrombie
2001	Blasphemy the Movie	Zues	
2001	Shrek	Additional voices	
2005	Marilyn Hotchkiss' Ballroom Dancing and Charm School	Evrin Sezgin	
2005	The L.A. Riot Spectacular	Auctioneer	
2006	Garfield: A Tail of Two Kitties	Smithee	
2006	Inland Empire	Henry The Butler	
2007	Trust Me	Teitelbaum	
2007	Hard Four	Jack Ermine	
2008	Star Wars: The Clone Wars	Chancellor Palpatine / Darth Sidious	Voice
2010	Harry Potter and the Forbidden Journey	Professor Swoopstikes	Short film
2011	Rango	Ambrose	Voice

=== Television ===
Year	Title	Role	Notes
1977–1983	Fantasy Island	McShane / Inspector Lestrade / Bartender	3 episodes
1978	Battlestar Galactica	Forger 7	Episode: "The Long Patrol"
1981	Knots Landing	Caterer	Episode: "Secrets"
1982	Marian Rose White	Lord Bates	Television film
1982	Voyagers!	Bitiatus	Episode: "Created Equal"
1982	The Devlin Connection	Auctioneer	Episode: "The French Detective"
1983	Happy Days	Oscar	Episode: "Hello, Pfisters"
1983	Journey's End		Television film
1983	Tucker's Witch	Doorman	Episode: "Dye Job"
1984	Three's Company	Lawyer	Episode: "The Heiress"
1984	Divorce Court		2 episodes
1984–1985	Santa Barbara	Philip / Butler	15 episodes
1985	Airwolf	Lord Killebrew	Episode: "Inn at the End of the Road"
1985	Kicks	Barnes	Television film
1985	Who's The Boss?	Leo	Episode: "Angela's Ex: Part 2"
1987	It's Garry Shandling's Show	Fate	Episode: "Fate"
1988	Frog	Dr. Fritsky	Television film
1988	Hunter	George Cooper	Episode: "The Black Dahlia"
1989	21 Jump Street	Lemieux	Episode: "Old Haunts in the New Age"
1989	Alf	British Announcer	Episode: "Mind Games"
1990	Tales from the Crypt	Fulton	Episode: "The Switch"
1990	Twin Peaks	Tom Brockman	Episode: "#2.6"
1990	The Flash	Skip	Episode: "Ghost in the Machine"
1994–1998	Seinfeld	Justin Pitt	7 episodes
1995	Babylon 5	Correlilmurzon	Episode: "Acts of Sacrifice"
1996	Rattled	Dr. Semkins	Television film
1996	A Face to Die For	Mr. Sturetsky	Television film
1996	Party Girl	Mr. Davenport	Episode: "Virgin Mary"
1997	Touched by an Angel	George Taylor	Episode: "Inherit the Wind"
1997–2002	Days of Our Lives	Hotel Manager / Jeweller / Mr. Simkins / Lawyer	4 episodes
1997	Over the Top	Nigel	Episode: "Acting Out"
1998	NewsRadio	Cadbury	Episode: "The Secret of Management"
1998	Buffy the Vampire Slayer	Old Man / German Boss	Episode: "Homecoming"
1998	Beyond Belief: Fact or Fiction	Emile	Episode: "The Mummy/The Perfect Record/Grave Sitting/Murder on the Second Floor/They Towed My Car"
1999–2000	Star Trek: Voyager	Abbot / Milo	2 episodes
2000	Love & Money	Arthur	Episode: "The Step Mummy"
2001	State of Grace	Donnie Thursday	Episodes: "Time in a Bottle" and "Happy Together"
2002	Crossing Jordan	George	Episode: "Acts of Mercy"
2002	The Random Years	Sir Milton Pith	Episode: "Don't Make Me Have Sex in the Hamptons"
2002	Chromiumblue.com	Sir George	13 episodes
2002	The District	Leon	Episode: "Old Wounds"
2002–2003	Birds of Prey	Alfred Pennyworth	14 episodes
2003	Nip/Tuck	Cyril Parks	Episode: "Escobar Gallardo"
2004	Charmed	Aramis, Member of The Tribunal	Episode: "Crimes and Witch-Demeanors"
2005	The Grim Adventures of Billy & Mandy	F	Voice, episode: "Scythe 2.0"
2006	The Batman	Ewan	Voice, episode: "The Icy Depths"
2006	Desperate Housewives	Rupert Cavanaugh	Episode: "Beautiful Girls"
2007–2012	Wizards of Waverly Place	Professor Crumbs	10 episodes
2008	How I Met Your Mother	Benjamin Franklin	Episode: "The Goat"
2008–2014	Star Wars: The Clone Wars	Chancellor Palpatine / Darth Sidious	Voice, 29 episodes
2011	Childrens Hospital	Butler	Episode: "Run, Dr. Lola Spratt, Run"
2011	Happily Divorced	Victor	Episode: "Spousal Support"
2011–2013	Green Lantern: The Animated Series	Ganthet	Voice, 5 episodes

=== Video games ===
Year	Title	Role	Notes
2002	James Bond 007: Nightfire	Alexander Mayhew	
2004	RalliSport Challenge 2	Narrator	
2005	Area 51	Dr. Winston Cray	
2005	Agatha Christie: And Then There Were None	Thomas Rogers, General Mackenzie	Based on the novel of the same name.
2008	Star Wars: The Clone Wars – Lightsaber Duels	Darth Sidious	
2009	Star Wars: The Clone Wars – Republic Heroes	Chancellor Palpatine / Darth Sidious	
