= Blade Kitten =

2010 video game

- Developer: Krome Studios
- Publisher: Atari
- Director: Steve Stamatiadis
- Engine: Merkury Engine
- Platforms: Windows, PlayStation 3, Xbox 360
- Release: NA: September 21, 2010 (PS3); WW: September 22, 2010; WW: Episode 2: March 16, 2015 (Steam)
- Genre: Action-platform
- Mode: Single-player

Blade Kitten is a 2.5D action-platform video game developed by Krome Studios and published by Atari. It is based on the webcomic of the same name about a female half-human, half-cat bounty hunter named Kit Ballard. It features a type of anime-style, cel shaded graphics.

The game was released on Microsoft Windows, PlayStation 3 and Xbox 360 in September 2010. After Krome Studios purchased back publishing rights to the title, they released Episode 2 as DLC in March 2015 on Steam.

== Plot and gameplay ==
Blade Kitten is a video game adaptation of the anime-styled webcomic series by Steve Stamatiadis, the game's director.

Blade Kitten is a 2.5D platforming action adventure game set three years before the comic book series on an artificial alien planetoid known as Hollow Wish. The game begins with Kit tracking down a local troublemaker called Terra-Li but on her way to doing so, Kit uncovers a dark and evil secret about Hollow Wish and its inhabitants. Soon after arriving at the planetoid, Kit runs into fellow bounty hunter Justice Kreel who destroys her ship and steals her breaker key which contains all the information she needs to track down and capture Terra-Li. While the only playable character is Kit, the game does boast a large array of alternate costumes that change either Kits clothing or to a completely different person.

The game also includes Kit's alien sidekick Skiffy and her floating sword called a Darque Blade. She is able to swing her sword at close range or send it flying over a larger distance to attack enemies and hit inaccessible switches. While progressing through the game, the sword can be upgraded and changed to four different types of blade that can deal either higher amounts of damage, faster attack speed or auto lock-on. She can also ride dinosaur style animals called Noots over the plains of Hollow Wish.

The game features different types of collectible items that are picked up while progressing through the game or a hidden inside treasure chests which themselves are hidden somewhere in each level. These items act as both a score booster and the games currency, which can be used to buy upgrades like more health and stamina for Kit Ballard, costume changes and blade upgrades. The Krome Studios mascot, Ty the Tasmanian Tiger also makes an appearance as one of the unlockable costumes. The game consists of nineteen levels and three boss battles.

== Characters ==
- Kit Ballard is a universally famous bounty hunter and the game's main protagonist. She has arrived on Hollow Wish to claim the bounty reward for taking down the gang cult leader, Terra-Li.
- Justice Kreel is a fellow bounty hunter and rival to Kit. She destroys Kit's ship and steals her key at the beginning of the game. She hopes to stop the gang leader Terra-Li first so that she can claim the bounty reward for herself.
- Terra-Li is the game's main villain and leader of the Norteun Wolves gang that is stationed on Hollow Wish. She has a bounty of one million Hex, dead or alive (preferably alive) on her head.
- Skiffy is Kit Ballard's pet Skiff and faithful companion. He changes colour to red when the attack bar is full, alerting the player that they can use Kit's special attacks.
- Walrut Hed is sheriff of Hollow Wish. He sometimes helps Kit on what to do next.
- Terra-Gin is the son of Terra-Li. In the final level of episode one, he went to save his mother from her damaged Dreadnought after she was knocked out by Kit.
- The Sol-Triumvirate are the enforcers of Hollow Wish. They are an obstacle to Kit's objectives and will do anything to stop her.
- The Norteun Wolves are the outlaws of Hollow Wish. Led by Terra-Li, they also plan to stop Kit from reaching her goals.
- The Magasse Sisterhood are an unknown organization.

== Development ==
The game was first announced to the public via the Blade Kitten official websites blog in April 2009 and was created by Krome Studios Creative Director, Steve Stamatiadis who is also the creator and writer of the Blade Kitten comics series. Once he had finished working on Star Wars: The Force Unleashed, he returned to working on Blade Kitten, which had been a project he had wanted to do for some time. "Blade Kitten is a brain child of mine that originated as a comic series," said Stamatiadis. "Bringing Kit's anime-inspired universe to life is a milestone for us, and we're excited to open her world up to gamers."

Around four hundred eighty people auditioned for the voice roles of the game's seven of the main characters. The voice actress Kelly Fuller was chosen to be the voice of Kit Ballard. The game was showcased at many events, to help promote it during the run up to its release, such as the PAX Seattle and the Supanova Pop Culture Expo.

On June 2, 2010, Atari announced that they had acquired the rights to publish the game. At the same time it was announced that the PlayStation Network game would also be coming to Xbox Live Arcade.

On May 22, 2014 Krome Studios announced they had obtained the rights for Blade Kitten back from Atari and were re-publishing the game.

On March 16, 2015, Episode 2 was released on Steam.

== Reception ==
Reception

Aggregate score
Aggregator	Score		
Aggregator	PC	PS3	Xbox 360
Metacritic	52/100	59/100	58/100

Review scores
Publication	Score		
Publication	PC	PS3	Xbox 360
The A.V. Club	N/A	N/A	C+
Destructoid	N/A	5.5/10	N/A
Eurogamer	8/10	8/10	8/10
Game Informer	N/A	6.5/10	6.5/10
GameRevolution	D	D	D
GameSpot	4.5/10	5/10	5/10
GameZone	N/A	5/10	5/10
IGN	5/10	5/10	5/10
Joystiq	N/A	3.5/5	N/A
Official Xbox Magazine (US)	N/A	N/A	7/10
PlayStation: The Official Magazine	N/A	6/10	N/A

Blade Kitten received "mixed" reviews on all platforms according to the review aggregation website Metacritic.

Most reviewers criticize the game's level design, lack of difficulty and high price but praising the game's graphical style and in game cutscenes. IGN said that the game "relies too heavily on its anime-style charm, which doesn't translate to other areas of the title." 1Up.com gave the Xbox 360 version a more favorable review and said that "Kit Ballard's first outing may be flawed, but it's never really terrible either." GameSpot claimed that the "clumsy action platformer is often far too easy, and the action doesn't generate much excitement."

Eurogamer gave the game a much more favourable review, claiming that "If Blade Kitten is a signal of intent for Atari's on going digital reinvention, then the future looks bright for all concerned." The gaming site NowGamer said that Blade Kitten "somehow manages to hold onto just enough quality and semi-inspired design to offer it a certain amount of credibility", despite the game's shortcomings causing "minor motion sickness".
