= Star Wars: The Clone Wars =

2008 American TV series

- Genre: Action; Adventure; Science fiction; Fantasy
- Created by: George Lucas
- Based on: Star Wars by George Lucas
- Starring: Tom Kane; Matt Lanter; Ashley Eckstein; James Arnold Taylor; Dee Bradley Baker; Corey Burton
- Narrated by: Tom Kane
- Composer: Kevin Kiner
- Country of origin: United States
- No. of seasons: 7
- No. of episodes: 133 (list of episodes)

Production
- Executive producers: George Lucas; Catherine Winder (seasons 1–3); Dave Filoni (season 7); Sareana Sun (season 7); Shuzo John Shiota (season 7)
- Producers: Cary Silver; Catherine Winder (seasons 1–2); Caroline Kermel (season 7); Daisy Fang (season 7)
- Running time: 22 minutes
- Production companies: Lucasfilm; Lucasfilm Animation; CGCG, Inc
- Budget: $750,000–$2 million (per episode)

Original release
- Network: Cartoon Network
- Release: October 3, 2008 – March 2, 2013
- Network: Netflix
- Release: March 7, 2014
- Network: Disney+
- Release: February 21 – May 4, 2020

Related
- Star Wars Rebels; Star Wars: The Bad Batch; Star Wars: Tales; The Mandalorian; Ahsoka; Star Wars: Maul – Shadow Lord

Star Wars: The Clone Wars is an American animated science fiction television series created by George Lucas and produced by Lucasfilm Animation. Set after Star Wars: Episode II – Attack of the Clones (2002), both before and during Star Wars: Episode III – Revenge of the Sith (2005), it follows Jedi Knights Anakin Skywalker (Matt Lanter), Obi-Wan Kenobi (James Arnold Taylor), and Anakin's Padawan, Ahsoka Tano (Ashley Eckstein) as they lead the Galactic Republic's clone army (Dee Bradley Baker) against the Separatist Alliance, commanded by Count Dooku (Corey Burton) during the Clone Wars.

The series originated from Lucas's desire to explore the untold stories of the Clone Wars era including characters and planets briefly mentioned in the Star Wars prequel trilogy. Development began as early as 2004. Lucas hired supervising director Dave Filoni after seeing his work on the first season of Avatar: The Last Airbender. Lucas worked closely with Filoni, and the creative team to draw inspiration from a variety of sources, including the original Star Wars trilogy and Ralph McQuarrie's concept art, while also drawing on elements of anime, manga, and Genndy Tartakovsky's Clone Wars (2003–2005) microseries. The series explores themes rarely touched on in youth entertainment, such as war, genocide, sexism, gender roles, racism, slavery, imperialism, totalitarianism, corporatism, class warfare, political corruption, indoctrination, animal cruelty, and free choice.

The series was preceded by an animated theatrical film of the same name in August 2008, originally intended to serve as its first episodes. It officially premiered on October 3, 2008, on Cartoon Network and ran for five seasons before its initial cancellation in 2013. Following its cancellation in 2013, a project titled The Clone Wars Legacy adapted unfinished story arcs into other formats such as comics and novels. The series was later revived with a sixth season on Netflix in 2014 and a seventh and final season on Disney+ in 2020, which concluded with the critically acclaimed "Siege of Mandalore" arc, set parallel to the events of Revenge of the Sith. Although plans for an eighth season were ultimately scrapped, the series was followed by several sequels, including Star Wars Rebels (2014–2018), as well as the spin-offs The Bad Batch (2021–2024), Ahsoka (2023–present), and Star Wars: Maul – Shadow Lord (2026–present)

The Clone Wars was a ratings success for Cartoon Network. While viewership fluctuated across seasons, the series consistently performed well, showing significant year-over-year growth. In its later years, the series experienced a surge in demand on streaming platforms, coinciding with the debut of The Mandalorian (2019–2023), and the release of its seventh season, becoming the most in-demand sci-fi series in the United States. It also received critical acclaim and garnered numerous awards and nominations, including Daytime Emmy Awards and the Annie Awards.

== Premise ==
Star Wars: The Clone Wars is an animated series set between Star Wars: Episode II – Attack of the Clones (2002) and Star Wars: Episode III – Revenge of the Sith (2005), during the Clone Wars, a three-year conflict between the Galactic Republic and the Separatists. The series "flesh[es] out the adventures of Jedi Knights Obi-Wan Kenobi and Anakin Skywalker" while exploring characters and planets introduced in the prequel films. It follows the Republic's fight against the Separatists, with the Jedi leading clone armies against droid forces commanded by Count Dooku and General Grievous. In addition to focusing on Anakin and Obi-Wan, the series explores other Jedi, introduces new and returning villains, and gives more attention to the Troopers and their experiences in the war.

Spanning 133 episodes, the series delves into the moral complexities of war, blurring the lines between good and evil, echoing Revenge of the Sith's opening crawl: "There are heroes on both sides. Evil is everywhere." This portrayal helped establish the series as a significant part of Star Wars lore, expanding the mythology in ways the films did not. It also bridges the gap between the prequels and the wider Star Wars universe, offering insight into the stakes leading up to Revenge of the Sith. Along the way, it deepens key characters like Anakin, Obi-Wan, Padme, and the Jedi Council while introducing new ones such as Ahsoka Tano, Cad Bane, Saw Gerrera, and Mandalorians like Duchess Satine Kryze and Bo-Katan.

== Episodes ==
Season	Subtitle	Episodes	Originally released		
Season	Subtitle	Episodes	First released	Last released	Network
Film	The Clone Wars	—	August 15, 2008		Theatrical release
1	—	22	October 3, 2008	March 20, 2009	Cartoon Network
2	Rise of the Bounty Hunters	22	October 2, 2009	April 30, 2010	Cartoon Network
3	Secrets Revealed	22	September 17, 2010	April 1, 2011	Cartoon Network
4	Battle Lines	22	September 16, 2011	March 16, 2012	Cartoon Network
5	—	20	September 29, 2012	March 2, 2013	Cartoon Network
6	The Lost Missions	13	March 7, 2014		Netflix
7	The Final Season	12	February 21, 2020	May 4, 2020	Disney+

=== Production sequence ===
Pablo Hidalgo explained on his Twitter account in 2016 that the series followed a complicated production schedule. Often, more episodes were produced than broadcast during a given season, resulting in episodes being released out of order. Typically, the production team followed a 26-episode schedule, which resulted in a few episodes being held back and aired the following season. For example, in season five, the team decided to air only 20 episodes instead of the usual 22. This decision led to further adjustments. If they had gone with a 19-episode season instead, the Clovis arc (season six, episodes 5–6), which was originally part of the season four production slate, would have been included in season five, and the Younglings arc (season five, episodes 6–9) would have been cut.

While considering the future of the Youngling arc, Lucas envisioned it as the basis for a standalone series. He had the episodes edited into a pilot film, which was screened at that year's Star Wars Celebration. However, the motivation to create a spinoff was eventually abandoned, and the pilot idea was scrapped. As a result, the episodes remained part of season five. Additionally, only 13 of the intended 24 episodes aired in season six, and just 12 of 24 episodes aired in season seven. To help viewers understand the narrative timeline, the official Star Wars Twitter account shared an article in 2014 presenting the series in chronological order. This marked the first time Lucasfilm had promoted the episode guide on social media, and the list was later updated after the final season aired.

== Characters ==
=== Main ===
- Matt Lanter as Anakin Skywalker – A bold and skilled Jedi Knight believed to be the prophesied Chosen One; also voices Lom Pyke and other characters.
- Ashley Eckstein as Ahsoka Tano – Anakin Skywalker's Padawan.
- James Arnold Taylor as Obi-Wan Kenobi – A wise and diplomatic Jedi Master serving as a general in the Clone Wars; also voices Plo Koon, Osi Sobek, and others.
- Dee Bradley Baker as Captain Rex – A clone trooper captain; also voices all other clone troopers. Baker voices several supporting characters such as Saesee Tiin, Bossk, and Admiral Trench.
- Corey Burton as Count Dooku / Darth Tyranus – A former Jedi turned Sith Lord leading the Separatist Alliance; also voices Cad Bane and Ziro the Hutt.
- Tom Kane as Narrator – The series' narrator, setting the tone for each episode; also voices Yoda, Admiral Wullf Yularen, and other side characters.

=== Guests ===
The following is a selected list of notable guest appearances in the series.

- Pernilla August as Shmi Skywalker – Reprised her role as Shmi for a single scene in the Mortis arc (third-season episodes 15–17).
- Liam Neeson as Qui-Gon Jinn – Reprised his role as a Force ghost in several scenes during the Mortis arc and returned again in season six in a few scenes.
- Daniel Logan as Boba Fett – Reprised his role as young Boba Fett in five episodes, though his performance received criticism.
- Simon Pegg as Dengar – A ruthless bounty hunter from the original trilogy, reintroduced in the series as part of a team alongside Boba Fett and other mercenaries.
- David Tennant as Huyang – An ancient droid who helps Younglings construct lightsabers in a three-episode arc in season five. He won an Emmy for his performance at Outstanding Performer In An Animated Program category.
- Jon Favreau as Pre Vizsla – The leader of Death Watch in seasons two through five, Vizsla is a warrior and political radical who temporarily allies with Darth Maul to reclaim Mandalore.
- Katee Sackhoff as Bo-Katan Kryze – A strong, loyal, and independent warrior of the Death Watch group, Bo-Katan debuted in season four. Despite appearing in only nine episodes, the character stood out for her resolve within the Mandalorian terrorist organization, becoming an instant fan favorite.
- Mark Hamill as Darth Bane – An ancient Sith Lord who appears in Yoda's vision in season six, marking the character's canon debut. Hamill previously portrayed Luke Skywalker in the Original Trilogy, a role he would reprise for the subsequent sequel trilogy following Disney's acquisition of Lucasfilm in 2012.

== Production ==
=== Concept and creation ===
Lucas first envisioned an animated Star Wars series set during the Clone Wars era as early as 2002, even though he originally planned to end the story with Star Wars: Episode III – Revenge of the Sith (2005). During the film's production in 2004, Lucas decided to move forward with an animated series developed in-house. He worked with the R&D division of his company, Lucasfilm to launch Lucasfilm Animation to develop the series. Lucas then hired a team of "young, Star Wars-obsessed artists" and worked closely with Dave Filoni. Lucas financed the series himself and charged Time Warner licensing fees to distribute it. According to an anonymous source familiar with the company's animation operations, the earliest episodes likely cost between $750,000 and $1.5 million each.

In August 2005, Lucas confirmed that two Star Wars-themed television projects were underway: an animated series and a live-action series. In February 2006, Steve Sansweet emphasized that Lucas was deeply involved in the production process and that the series was scheduled for release in fall 2007. A year later, at the 2007 William S. Paley Television Festival, Lucas revealed that the animated series would consist of 100 episodes and described it as a "test" for a larger project. He promised it would feel more like the live-action films in terms of ambiance, pushing the boundaries of what television animation could achieve. Lucas also noted that his team was producing the episodes before securing a network deal, though he was confident that finding a broadcaster would be easy.

After finishing the first 22 episodes, Lucas pitched the series to television networks in late 2007. The initial response was lukewarm; Fox Broadcasting passed, even though its sister company, 20th Century Fox, had released the Star Wars films, and Cartoon Network, despite having aired Star Wars: Clone Wars (2003–2005), hesitated. However, Lucas's decision to produce a theatrical film of the same name attracted Warner Brothers' interest, leading them to persuade Cartoon Network to reconsider. The film, released in August 2008, was composed of four episodes from the series, originally conceived as a three-part arc titled "Castle of Deception", "Castle of Doom", and "Castle of Salvation", along with a standalone episode, "The New Padawan", which introduced Ahsoka Tano. While it was in theaters, Cartoon Network president at the time, Stuart Snyder, heard about the series and flew to San Francisco to screen several episodes. He praised it, calling it a "game-changer for Friday night programming." Around this time, Lucas had already announced that he was working on the second and third seasons and forging ahead with a live-action television series.

=== Writing and franchise continuity ===
In early stages of development, Filoni proposed a series centered on a group of recurring characters traveling aboard a spaceship similar to the Millennium Falcon, including a Jedi apprentice named Ashla, and her Jedi Master. (Note: This later inspired Star Wars Rebels.) Working with Henry Gilroy, Filoni developed early concepts and introduced original characters such as Rotta and his great-uncle, Ziro, aiming to tell a story that would not interfere with existing Star Wars continuity, with occasional appearances by film characters like Obi-Wan Kenobi and Anakin Skywalker.

However, Lucas rejected this approach, insisting the series focus on film characters. As a result, Ashla was reimagined as Ahsoka, Anakin's Padawan, and Rotta and Ziro were integrated into the theatrical film. Ahsoka was originally conceived as Obi-Wan's Padawan, but Lucas reassigned her to Anakin to break their repetitive dynamic and highlight Anakin's growth as a Jedi. Filoni and Gilroy developed Ahsoka as a blend of "Anakin's brashness and Obi-Wan's measured judgment," symbolizing the transition from Republic to Empire. Filoni explained, "Ahsoka is between them, looking back at what was, looking forward to what might be." Lucas added that her role was to help mature Anakin, shifting him from the "wild child" of Attack of the Clones into a more responsible mentor.

Lucas and Filoni co-developed many of the series' scripts, drawing from concepts Lucas had kept since the original trilogy in 1977. The script also draws inspiration from Expanded Universe of Lucas's space opera, manga, and 1950s science fiction, with each episode opening with a voiceover recap of the previous installment, followed by an on-screen moral lesson—nicknamed the "Jedi cookie"— which introduces each episode's theme and encourages kids to think.

In a 2008 interview with Gizmodo, Lucas compared the Clone Wars era to WW II, describing it as a vast and untapped period full of storytelling potential. He explained that, unlike the films—which were narrowly focused on one character and the psychological underpinnings— the series would shift attention to side characters and expand the broader Star Wars universe. Lucas aimed to take a more lighthearted, episodic approach, inspired by Indiana Jones. While some episodes were intended to be comedic, the series deliberately avoided the tone of Saturday-morning cartoons. Its episodic format allowed the series to move beyond Skywalker-centered storylines and explore a wider range of characters and events. However, as the series progressed, its tone gradually became darker.

Producer Catherine Winder described the series as being "akin to an anthology series." She explained that this format allowed each 22-minute episode to stand on its own, enabling viewers to jump in at any point and quickly get oriented. While some episodes are action-driven, many focus on personal, character-based stories that offer deeper insight into both familiar and lesser-known characters from the Star Wars universe. Winder explained, "the overall goal and spirit, however, is tonally following the flavor of Episode IV: A New Hope (1977)." However, by season three, the series adopted a fully chronological format, and by season five, it shifted to four-episode arcs.

In 2008 interview with CBR, Filoni explained that he and Lucas aimed to emulate the original film's accessibility, crafting stories casual viewers could enjoy without deep knowledge of the Star Wars universe, while still featuring familiar elements. Filoni acknowledged the difficulty of crafting suspenseful stories when key outcomes such as Anakin's fall to Darth Vader, are already known. To maintain narrative tension, he focused on characters with uncertain futures like Captain Rex or Ahsoka.

The series released in mid-2008 sparked debate about their place in the Star Wars canon, particularly regarding their timeline and conflicts with existing continuity. Writer Gilroy explained that Lucasfilm uses a tiered canon system, (Note: For more in-depth definition, see Star Wars in other media#Holocron database and canonicity) and continuity expert Leland Chee introduced "T-canon" to categorize television content. After Disney acquired Lucasfilm in 2012, it redefined the canon, branding most pre-2014 material as Legends. The Clone Wars remained official canon due to its popularity and narrative importance.

=== Themes and analysis ===
Bryan Young of Slashfilm argues that The Clone Wars, especially its pilot film, draws significant inspiration from samurai cinema, notably the 1989 film Shogun's Shadow. He highlights visual and narrative parallels, emphasizing the Jedi's resemblance to noble warrior protectors. Young also notes stylistic echoes of Akira Kurosawa's work, including dynamic action sequences and cinematography influenced by his visual style. Marissa Martinelli of Slate argues that, despite being a cartoon series, it is not aimed at children due to its moral ambiguity, the debate between free will and destiny, themes of revenge, and the way it experiments with various genres, from horror pastiches to Kurosawa homages. A study published in the Journal of Policing, Intelligence and Counter Terrorism by Colin Atkinson argues that the series offers an accurate portrayal of how societies militarize during wartime. Using themes like policing, espionage, and institutional change, Atkinson argues that key episodes mirror real-world conflicts, like WW II. The series also illustrates how peaceful institutions, like the Jedi Order, adopt warlike tactics, which blurs ethical boundaries. Thus, the series serves as a resource for learning about the moral ambiguities of war.

=== Design and influence ===
Filoni wanted a design that was original and sustainable for a TV production schedule and budget, so he ruled out photo-realism. He initially considered creating a CG version of Genndy Tartakovsky's Clone Wars microseries, but ultimately felt that was not the right approach. However, CG supervisor Joel Aron noted that Tartakovsky's vision still influenced the series' visual effects, explaining, "Its influence shows in elements such as the shapes of explosions and smoke, and the use of dramatic silhouettes." Though the series uses CGI, it is intentionally not photorealistic. Lucas explained that this choice reflected a desire to treat animation as an art form, using computers as "paintbrushes" to craft a distinctive visual style. Characters were described as resembling painted wooden puppets, evoking the look of the 1960s marionette series Thunderbirds blended with elements of Japanese cartoon style, echoing Lucas initial anime-inspired vision, which gradually diminished as the series evolved.

Instead of adapting existing animation styles, Filoni and artist Alex Woo spent a month exchanging sketches to develop a new aesthetic direction. Although the series was conceived as a "new take on Star Wars," they aimed to retain the classic feel of the original films, drawing heavy inspiration from Ralph McQuarrie's pre-production artwork. Filoni envisioned every episode feeling like a moving McQuarrie painting, as if painted directly onto the TV screen. Inspired by this idea, Producer Justin Leach created rough 3D models based on McQuarrie's paintings of Jabba's palace on Tatooine, adding slight camera movements to bring them to life, Leach recalled "It was the first inkling of what the show might turn into". Filoni also wanted a painted, handmade look, so the animation team used textured, stylized designs rather than aiming for realism.

He noted that the character design became defined by intense curves and angular graphic shapes, a style never before seen in a CG cartoon. He explained that they "were intentionally carving angles into the characters, using light and shadow to create graphic looks." He later recalled: "we're going to have the characters be somewhat stylized, somewhat graphic, but still have some of the photorealism that you see in the films. This way they live in their own reality where you're not expecting it to be photo-real -- but it's not cartoony and not overly exaggerated either. So they live in a believable level of realism."

To visualize the characters in 3D, sculptor Darren Marshall created clay maquettes, Marshall recalled, "I was sculpting the original maquettes, and I remember Dave telling us that he wanted the characters to look like the characters, not so much the actors." For the design of the clone troopers, Filoni stated in 2007 that mobility was prioritized, as the production team needed to reuse models efficiently for TV. To achieve this, certain armor gaps were widened and some shoulder joints were omitted to accommodate animation needs. Writer Gilroy recommended Kilian Plunkett, a comic book artist who had worked on Star Wars comics for Dark Horse. Plunkett delivered concept designs for Mace Windu, Palpatine, and the droids R2-D2 and C-3PO.

The visual style aimed for a balance between the realism of the Star Wars films and the stylized approach of the earlier Clone Wars micro-series, emphasizing inspirations including Gentle Giant maquettes and Paul Rudish's original designs. The creative team wanted to honor both the animated legacy and the cinematic tone of the franchise, particularly in anticipation of an upcoming live-action series at the time that was never produced. The series also drew from a wide range of cinematic influences. Sansweet compared the series's use of CG animation to Toy Story, while Aron cited The Empire Strikes Back (1980) as a key visual reference. Aron also drew from personal favorites, including Jaws (1975), Close Encounters of the Third Kind (1977), Indiana Jones, The Deer Hunter (1978), and Butch Cassidy and the Sundance Kid (1969), noting that "you'll always see those influences pop up in any given episode."

=== Animation and storyboard ===
In order to achieve an anime-inspired look, Lucasfilm Animation initially considered outsourcing animation to Japanese studios and potentially bringing in a Japanese director. However, this plan changed when they connected with Taipei-based CGCG, a studio known for its 3D animation work on projects like Bionicle: Mask of Light (2003) and Devilman (2004). Impressed by their style and organization, Lucasfilm chose the studio as a partner. The production team also worked in the Bay Area, Taipei, Tokyo, Singapore, and at Skywalker Ranch in California. To support this globally distributed production, Lucasfilm adopted Autodesk Maya as its primary animation platform. The California team set the story and key scenes, while the studios in Asia handled animation. This 24-hour pipeline enabled the production of an unprecedented eight minutes of finished animation each week. Character designs were translated into digital form using Maya, which was also used to model figures such as Anakin Skywalker, Obi-Wan Kenobi, R2-D2, and Jabba the Hutt.

The production team adopted a cinematic 2.35:1 widescreen ratio, which motivated Lucas to become more involved than he had originally planned. Producer Winder explained that the series used a non-linear production process, allowing the team to develop episodes out of sequence and revise them as the story evolved. This flexibility enabled the creation of sequels and prequels after standalone episodes had already been completed, an approach more typical of feature films than traditional television.

In the first season, the fast-paced production required extensive use of storyboards to map out sequences before animation, with every shot drawn by an episodic director or storyboard artist. As the series progressed, animators adopted a cutting-edge digital pre-visualization system. Using tools like the Director's Toolkit and a virtual camera, they blocked scenes and assembled episodes in real-time. According to supervisor Aron, artists used flat-screen monitors, styluses, and a vast 3D asset library, including characters, ships, and planets, stored on Lucasfilm's servers. The virtual camera allowed directors to navigate these environments freely, capturing shots from any angle and adjusting composition and timing on the fly. This approach enabled smoother, more dynamic visual storytelling and drew from an extensive library of Star Wars assets.

Director Filoni later explained that scenes were virtually blocked using a specialized digital tool called Zviz, developed by Lucas. It allowed directors to stage and rehearse scenes in 3D, similar to live-action filmmaking, and enabled continuous, cinematic camera movements for a more immersive experience. Filoni described the Bad Batch arc (season seven, episodes 1–4) as the "most authentic" to the series' original production style. He also noted that the final arc, Siege of Mandalore (episodes 9–12), marked a significant creative departure, pushing into new creative territory they had never before explored.

=== Voice casts ===
Some voice actors from earlier Star Wars animated projects returned for the series, including Tom Kane as Yoda and James Arnold Taylor as Obi-Wan Kenobi. Most characters were recast with new voice actors, as the original and prequel film casts did not return, except for Anthony Daniels, who reprised his role as C-3PO. Hayden Christensen, who portrayed Anakin Skywalker in the prequels, said in February 2008 that he had not been approached, though he expressed interest. Samuel L. Jackson likewise expressed interest in reprising his role as Mace Windu, but only voiced the character in the film. Lucas cited scheduling conflicts, budget constraints, and a preference for lesser-known talent, explaining that major stars were often unavailable and that celebrity involvement was unnecessary. He further emphasized, "I don't really think I need to hire a big movie star to publicize my movie".

Filoni described working with the actors as a collaborative process. Before recording, he meets with them to break down each episode and often engages in in-depth discussions about character interpretation. From the beginning, he told the cast that, while they were voicing classic characters, they should inhabit the roles themselves and not merely mimic the live-action performances, though they may incorporate subtle elements of those portrayals. Filoni also encourages the actors to trust their instincts, saying that if a line feels more inspired when delivered differently, he supports the changes.

=== Logo design and soundtracks ===
The series Logo design was carefully crafted to reflect elements from Attack of the Clones and The Empire Strikes Back. The goal was to align closely with the visual style of the original films by adopting a traditional logo approach and moving away from the "bull's-eye" motif that characterized the earlier Clone Wars series on Cartoon Network. The sound design was created by Ben Burtt, with a team from Skywalker Sound: David Acord, Juan Peralta, and Matthew Wood. All three had previously worked on the prequel films, ensuring it sounds like Star Wars. Peralta notes, "The entire crew considers each episode a mini-feature, and we are used to doing film-quality work". For the Malevolence arc (episodes 2–3), Acord creates new sounds using "real-world objects,, like a vibrating back massager on a vinyl record." Wood edits the sounds together, including the dialogue, while Peralta mixes the sound with the music.

Kevin Kiner composed the soundtrack for all episodes of the series. At Lucas's request, each planet in the Star Wars galaxy was given its own musical theme. Drawing inspiration from the scores of John Williams, Kiner incorporated many of Williams' musical motifs throughout the series. He also subtly integrated elements from his own work on CSI: Miami (2002–2012), following Lucas's wishes. Kiner described scoring an episode of the series as an intense and exhausting process, comparable to composing music for a feature film. He also explained that each character inspired different musical directions, especially Jedi Luminara Unduli, Plo Koon, and Ahsoka Tano.

=== Cancellation ===
On March 11, 2013, Lucasfilm announced that the series would end with its fifth season; this decision came shortly after Disney acquired Lucasfilm, signaling a shift in the direction of the Star Wars franchise. Although production for Cartoon Network was to "wind down," several episode arcs were already completed, with Filoni confirming that these story arcs, described as some of the "most thrilling" and important in the series, would be released later as bonus content. Around the same time, Lucasfilm announced that a new animated Star Wars project was in development. During this period, fans tried to bring the series back by starting petitions on platforms like Change.org, posting on social media, and using the hashtag #SaveTheCloneWars.

Initially, the series was planned to span 300 episodes; some had already been recorded, but much of the content was ultimately scrapped following its cancellation. In October 2015, journalist Chris Taylor stated in his book How Star Wars Conquered the Universe that the decision to cancel the series was primarily due to financial reasons. He explained that the series' high production costs around $2 million per episode, along with declining ratings and the need to allocate resources to upcoming Star Wars films, made its continuation unsustainable. At the 2018 London Comic-Con, Daniel Logan, the voice of Boba Fett, said the series was canceled because it became "too graphic," something he believed Disney was not used to at the time.

=== Revival ===
In 2013 Comic-Con, the series revival was announced, with its sixth and intended final season, subtitled The Lost Missions, which was released exclusively on Netflix. After acquiring the series, Netflix vice president Sean Carey said it was becoming darker and no longer fit with Cartoon Network, but that it was "a hidden gem that Disney brought to our attention, and we jumped all over it."

However, on July 19, 2018, during a panel at San Diego Comic-Con celebrating the series' tenth anniversary, it was revealed that series would be revived again on Disney+ for a final season to wrap up the stories left unresolved; the panel featured the hashtag #CloneWarsSaved in celebration of the series' return. Although an eighth season was scrapped, key storylines were repurposed for Star Wars Rebels (2014–2018) and Filoni later reworked some of them into the seventh season, tying the series into Revenge of the Sith.

== Release ==
=== Broadcast and streaming services ===
Star Wars: The Clone Wars episodes run about 22 minutes each, and is seen as "mini-movie" appealing to kids, particularly boys aged 6–14, and their nostalgic parents. The series debuted on Cartoon Network on October 3, 2008, at 9 p.m. following the release of a theatrical animated feature in August of that year. The series remained on Cartoon Network through season five, with new episodes beginning to air on Saturday mornings starting that season. Episodes first became available for streaming on iTunes the day after their original broadcast and were also offered for free on Cartoon Network's and StarWars.com's websites a week after its airdate.

Following its cancellation in 2013, the series was revived with a sixth and intended final season, released exclusively on Netflix in the United States and Canada on March 7, 2014. As part of a formal agreement between Netflix and Disney/ABC, all previous seasons were also made available on Netflix, marking the first time Star Wars content appeared on the platform. However, Disney's plans to launch its own streaming service, Disney+, led to the end of its content deal with Netflix in the summer of 2017, with all Star Wars content scheduled to leave the platform by April 7, 2019. Disney+ became the primary platform for streaming the series and Star Wars-related shows.

=== Home media ===
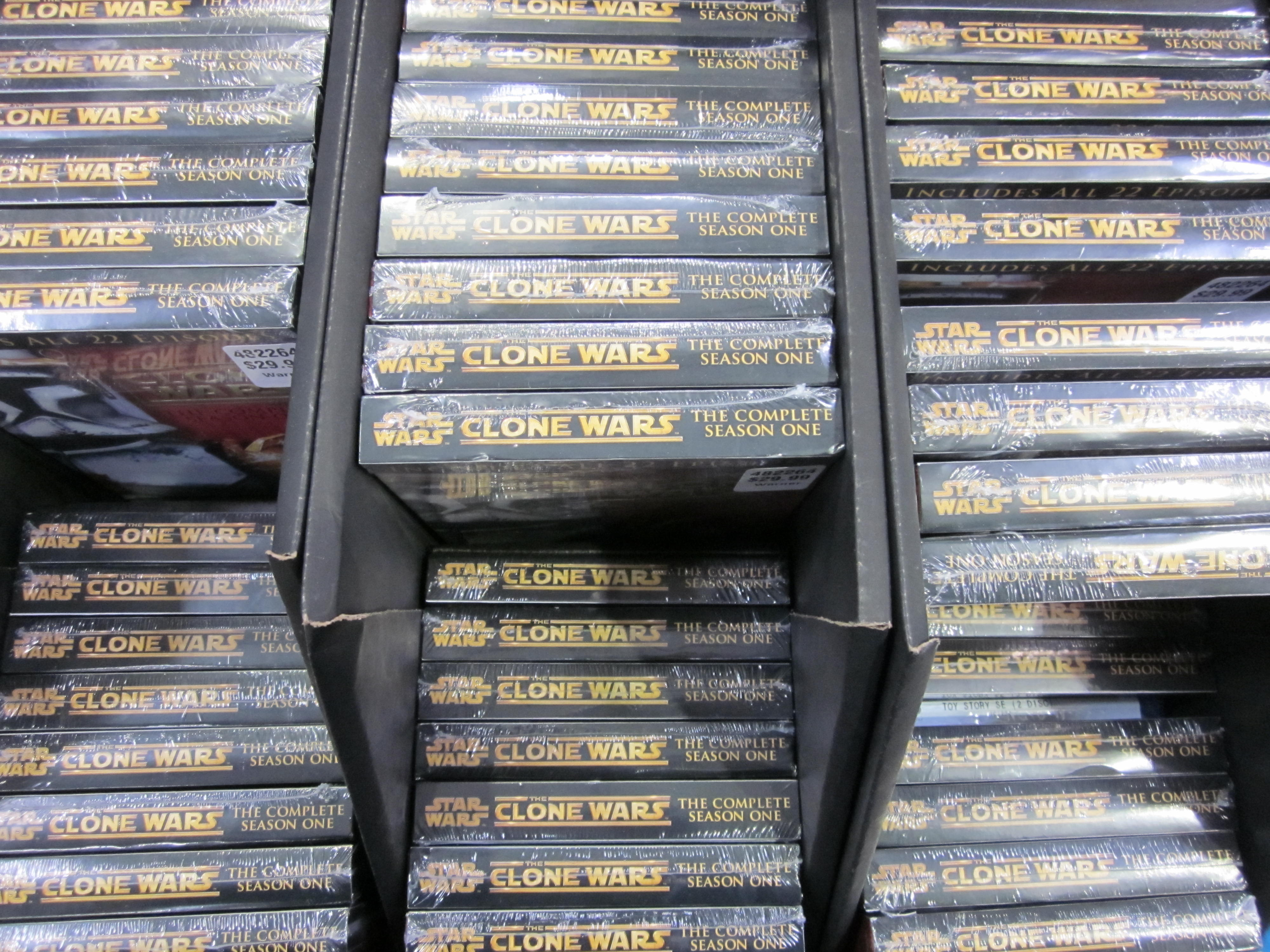
Box sets of the first season of The Clone Wars

Home media releases of Star Wars: The Clone Wars
Title	Release date	Format	Content	Notes	Ref.
A Galaxy Divided	March 24, 2009	DVD	Episodes 1–4	Initial release containing the first four episodes	
Clone Commandos	September 15, 2009	DVD	Episodes 5, 19–21	Volume 2 of the first season	
The Complete Season One	Fall 2009	DVD; Blu-ray	All Season 1 episodes	Includes director's cuts, video commentary, test animations, concept art, and exclusive content.	
The Complete Season Two	October 26, 2010	DVD; Blu-ray	All Season 2 episodes	Includes bonus features	
The Complete Season Three	October 18, 2011	DVD; Blu-ray	All Season 3 episodes	Includes bonus features	
The Nightsisters Trilogy: Feature-Length Cut	December 5, 2011	Digital	Season 3, episodes 12–14	Director's cuts/BTS interview	
Darth Maul Returns	September 11, 2012	DVD	Season 4, episodes 19–22	Focuses on Darth Maul's story arc/ directors' Cut	
The Complete Season Four	October 23, 2012	DVD; Blu-ray	All Season 4 episodes	Full season release with extras	
The Complete Season Five	October 15, 2013	DVD; Blu-ray	All Season 5 episodes	Full season release with extras	
Collector's Edition	October 14, 2013	DVD; Blu-ray	All seasons 1–5	Released alongside Season 5	
The Lost Missions (Season 6)	April 29, 2015	DVD; Blu-ray	All Season 6 episodes	Final season release	

== Reception ==
=== Viewership ===
Upon its debut, Star Wars: The Clone Wars was a ratings success for Cartoon Network. The series premiere drew 4 million total viewers, according to Nielsen Media Research. The premiere ranked as the number one program among all major kids' networks at the time across total viewers and key youth demographics, including 1.8 million viewers aged 2–11, 1.4 million aged 6–11, and 1.2 million tweens aged 9–14, setting a new record for a Cartoon Network original series debut. (Note: The previous record was held by Ben 10: Alien Force, which debuted on April 18, 2008, with 2.9 million viewers. The record was later broken on September 13, 2009, by the TV movie Scooby-Doo! The Mystery Begins, which drew 6.1 million viewers.) The episode's time slot experienced triple-digit percentage increases compared to the previous year. Although subsequent episodes in the first season dipped below 3 million viewers, the finale climbed back up to 3.29 million viewers.

The second-season premiere attracted 2.58 million viewers, with the finale reaching 2.76 million. The third season opened to 2.42 million viewers, and although viewership dipped below 2 million mid-season, the season finale was watched by 2.31 million. The fourth-season premiere marked a ratings low at the time, with 1.93 million viewers, though the finale rose to 2.03 million.

During its fifth season, the series maintained strong ratings despite being moved to Saturday morning in 2012, remaining one of the highest-rated series on the channel. While the schedule change led to a slight dip in overall viewership, the series still averaged 1.7 million total viewers and frequently ranked as the top telecast of the day among boys aged 9–14. According to a Turner spokesperson, the season ranked as the top program in its time slot among boys aged 9–14 in October of that year, with significant year-over-year growth across key youth demographics. Viewership increased by 46% among children aged 2–11, 34% aged 6–11, and 64% ages 9–14. Among boys specifically, the gains were even higher: up 45% for ages 2–11, 36% for ages 6–11, and 72% for ages 9–14.

According to Parrot Analytics, the series experienced multiple spikes in demand following the release of The Mandalorian (2019–2023). The first occurred after The Mandalorian premiered in November 2019, followed by a second in spring 2020 with the release of the seventh and final season. A third spike was recorded in October 2020, coinciding with the premiere episode of The Mandalorian's second season.

In early May 2020, the series topped U.S. streaming demand for two consecutive weeks. The May 1 release of its penultimate episode sparked a 43.3% surge. The early debut of the finale on May 4 pushed demand up another 65.8%, placing it well ahead of Stranger Things. Originally slated for May 8, the finale helped the series achieve 119 times the average show's demand, making it the most in-demand U.S. series and surpassing The Mandalorian in sci-fi rankings.

=== Critical response ===
Star Wars: The Clone Wars has become one of the most essential pieces of Star Wars. It was noted that despite a "rocky start," the series won over viewers and critics through its evolving characters, diverse story arcs, and increasingly good animation. Critics also acknowledged that, while some episodes may feel geared toward younger audiences, the series gradually delves into darker storylines.

It was noted that the series helped redeem the prequel trilogy by strip-mining its most compelling ideas and characters, expanding them into rich story arcs while also introducing new concepts of its own. It was noted that what began as an innocent animated TV series with an "anthology-esque structure" ultimately became a cornerstone of the Star Wars franchise, bridging gaps in the franchise mythos and addressing long-standing questions that had lingered for years, even if some filler episodes were weaker in comparison.

WhatCulture ranking it number five in their list of "Best Animated Sci-Fi TV Shows of All Time". They praised the series for living up to the films with its epic battles, rich mythology, clever twists, and satisfying conclusion. In 2009, IGN named the series as the 89th best animated series, specifically praising key episodes for having some of the best storylines in the Star Wars Expanded Universe. At San Diego Comic-Con in July 2010, Guinness World Records editor Craig Glenday presented supervising director Dave Filoni, CG supervisor Joel Aron, and lead designer Kilian Plunkett with a certificate recognizing the series as "the highest-rated sci-fi animation currently on television." In 2012, Entertainment Weekly ranked it at number eight in its list of "10 Best Cartoon Network Shows", praising its evolution since the 2008 pilot film and calling it a "cinematic actioner" appealing to both kids and adult audiences.

In a retrospective review, Marissa Martinelli of Slate acknowledged the criticism of the pilot film, calling its flaws fair but noting that it paved the way for the TV series. Though the first season leaned heavily on comic relief and kid-friendly antics, the series matured over six seasons into a "surprisingly complex drama," with violent character deaths. Still, Martinelli argues that the series strength lies not in how "dark" it gets, but in how it adds essential depth to the prequel trilogy and expands the Star Wars universe through side stories. She highlights its "radically populist approach" to storytelling, focusing on clones, bounty hunters, and lesser-known characters, long before The Last Jedi (2017) attempted something similar. William Thomas of Empire gave the series four out of five stars, noting that while it is not superior to the Star Wars films, its visual style is possibly "the best-looking cartoon show of all time." Thomas notes that, despite some uneven storytelling, the half-hour episodes and occasional cliffhangers perfectly suit its roots in Saturday-morning serials.

=== Awards and nominations ===
Accolades received by Star Wars: The Clone Wars
Year	Award	Category	Recipient(s)	Result	Ref.
2009	Motion Picture Sound Editors Awards	Best Sound Editing – Animation	Matthew Wood, David Acord, Frank Rinella, Dennie Thorpe, Jana Vance, and Ellen Heuer for the episode "Lair of Grievous"	Won	
2009	Annie Awards	Music in an Animated Television Production	Kevin Kiner for the episode "Rising Malevolence"	Nominated	
2009	35th Saturn Awards	Best Syndicated/Cable Television Series	Star Wars: The Clone Wars	Nominated	
2010	37th Annie Awards	Music in an Animated Television Production	Kevin Kiner for the episode "Weapons Factory"	Nominated	
2010	Motion Picture Sound Editors Awards	Best Sound Editing – Sound Effects, Foley, Dialogue, and ADR in Animation	Matthew Wood, David Acord, Frank Rinella, Ellen Heuer, Sean England, and Juan Peralta for the episode "Landing at Point Rain"	Nominated	
2010	Television Critics Association Awards	Outstanding Achievement in Animation	Star Wars: The Clone Wars	Nominated	
2010	2010 Teen Choice Awards	Outstanding Achievement in Animation	Star Wars: The Clone Wars	Nominated	
2011	38th Annie Awards	Best Animated Television Production	Lucasfilm Animation for the episode "ARC Troopers"	Nominated	
2011	38th Annie Awards	Voice Acting in a Television Production	Corey Burton as Baron Papanoida	Nominated	
2011	38th Annie Awards	Voice Acting in a Television Production	Nika Futterman as Asajj Ventress	Nominated	
2011	38th Annie Awards	Writing in a Television Production	Daniel Arkin for the episode "Heroes on Both Sides"	Nominated	
2012	38th Annie Awards	Animated Effects in an Animated Production	Joel Aron	Nominated	
2012	38th Annie Awards	Voice Acting in a Television Production	Nika Futterman as Asajj Ventress	Nominated	
2012	38th Annie Awards	Voice Acting in a Television Production	Dee Bradley Baker as Clone Troopers	Nominated	
2012	38th Annie Awards	Editorial in a Television Production	Jason Tucker	Nominated	
2012	38th Annie Awards	Best General Audience Animated TV Production	Star Wars: The Clone Wars	Nominated	
2012	2nd Critics' Choice Television Awards	Best Animated Series	Star Wars: The Clone Wars	Nominated	
2013	40th Annie Awards	Animated Effects in an Animated Production	Joel Aron	Nominated	
2013	40th Annie Awards	Character Animation in a Television Production	Keith Kellogg	Nominated	
2013	40th Annie Awards	Voice Acting in a Television Production	Sam Witwer as Darth Maul	Nominated	
2013	40th Annie Awards	Editorial in a Television Production	Jason Tucker	Nominated	
2013	3rd Critics' Choice Television Awards	Best Animated Series	Star Wars: The Clone Wars	Nominated	
2013	40th Daytime Emmy Awards	Outstanding Special Class Animated Program	Star Wars: The Clone Wars (Note: George Lucas as Executive Producer, Cary Silver as Producer, Athena Portillo as Line Producer, and Dave Filoni as Supervising Director.)	Won	
2013	40th Daytime Emmy Awards	Outstanding Performer in an Animated Program	David Tennant as Huyang	Won	
2013	40th Daytime Emmy Awards	Outstanding Performer in an Animated Program	Jim Cummings as Hondo Ohnaka	Nominated	
2013	40th Daytime Emmy Awards	Outstanding Performer in an Animated Program	Sam Witwer as Darth Maul	Nominated	
2013	40th Daytime Emmy Awards	Outstanding Directing in an Animated Program	Dave Filoni, Kyle Dunlevy, Brian Kalin O'Connell, Steward Lee, and Bosco Ng	Nominated	
2013	40th Daytime Emmy Awards	Outstanding Achievement in Music Direction and Composition	Kevin Kiner	Nominated	
2013	40th Daytime Emmy Awards	Outstanding Achievement in Sound Mixing – Animation	David Acord and Cameron Davis	Nominated	
2014	41st Annie Awards	Character Animation in a Television Production	Keith Kellogg	Nominated	
2014	41st Annie Awards	Editorial in a Television Production	Jason Tucker	Nominated	
2014	Motion Picture Sound Editors Awards	Best Sound Editing – Sound Effects, Foley, Dialogue, and ADR in Animation	Matthew Wood, David Acord, Dennie Thorpe, Jana Vance, Jeremy Bowker, Erik Foreman, Steve Slanec, Frank Rinella, Dean Menta, and Sean Kiner for the episode "Lawless"	Nominated	
2014	41st Daytime Emmy Awards	Outstanding Special Class Animated Program	George Lucas, Dave Filoni, Cary Silver, and Athena Yvette Portillo	Won	
2014	41st Daytime Emmy Awards	Outstanding Individual Achievement in Animation	Christopher Voy	Won	
2014	41st Daytime Emmy Awards	Outstanding Achievement in Sound Mixing – Animation	Cameron Davis, David Acord, Frank Rinella, and Mark Evans	Nominated	
2014	41st Daytime Emmy Awards	Outstanding Achievement in Sound Editing – Animation	Matthew Wood, Dean Menta, Jeremy Bowker, Erik Foreman, Pascal Garneau, Steve Slanec, Frank Rinella, Dennie Thorpe, Jana Vance, and David Acord	Nominated	
2015	Motion Picture Sound Editors Awards	Best Sound Editing – Animation	Matthew Wood, David Acord, Kevin Sellers, Steve Slanec, Jeremy Bowker, Dean Menta, and Sean Kiner for the episode "Sacrifice"	Won	
2015	42nd Daytime Emmy Awards	Outstanding Special Class Animated Program	George Lucas, Dave Filoni, Cary Silver, and Athena Yvette Portillo	Nominated	
2015	42nd Daytime Emmy Awards	Outstanding Performer in an Animated Program	Mark Hamill as Darth Bane	Nominated	
2015	42nd Daytime Emmy Awards	Outstanding Writing in an Animated Program	Christian Taylor	Nominated	
2015	42nd Daytime Emmy Awards	Outstanding Directing in an Animated Program	Dave Filoni, Brian Kalin O'Connell, Danny Keller, and Steward Lee	Nominated	
2015	42nd Daytime Emmy Awards	Outstanding Achievement in Sound Mixing – Animation	Cameron Davis, David Acord, Frank Rinella, and Mark Evans	Nominated	
2015	42nd Daytime Emmy Awards	Outstanding Achievement in Sound Editing – Animation	Matthew Wood, David Acord, Dean Menta, Jeremy Bowker, Steve Slanec, Andrea Gard, Kevin Sellers, Dennie Thorpe, and Jana Vance	Nominated	
2015	42nd Daytime Emmy Awards	Outstanding Achievement in Music Direction and Composition	Kevin Kiner	Nominated	
2021	Producers Guild of America Awards	Outstanding Children's Program	Star Wars: The Clone Wars	Nominated	
2021	46th Saturn Awards	Best Animated Television Series	Star Wars: The Clone Wars	Won	
2021	48th Annie Awards	Best Animated Television/Broadcast Production for Children	Lucasfilm Animation / Star Wars: The Clone Wars "Shattered"	Nominated	
2021	48th Annie Awards	Outstanding Achievement for Music in an Animated Television / Broadcast Production	Kevin Kiner for the episode "Victory and Death"	Nominated	
2021	48th Daytime Emmy Awards	Outstanding Writing Team For A Daytime Animated Program	Star Wars: The Clone Wars	Nominated	
2021	48th Daytime Emmy Awards	Outstanding Music Direction And Composition For A Preschool, Children's Or Animated Program	Star Wars: The Clone Wars	Nominated	
2021	48th Daytime Emmy Awards	Outstanding Sound Mixing and Sound Editing for a Daytime Animated Program	Star Wars: The Clone Wars mixing and sound editing crew (Note: Matthew Wood and David Acord served as Supervising Sound Editors, with Kimberly Patrick and Danielle Dupre as Re-Recording Mixers. James Spencer contributed as the Sound Editor, while Frank Rinella acted as Foley Supervisor. Jason Butler handled Foley Mixing, and Andrea Gard and Margie O'Malley worked as Foley Artists. Peter Lam was the Music Editor. Dialogue Editing was managed by Cameron Davis, Brian Frank, Tony Diaz, and Carlos Sotolongo.)	Won	

== Sequels ==
After Star Wars: The Clone Wars was initially cancelled following its fifth season in 2013, it was succeeded by Star Wars Rebels (2014–2018), which is seen as a sequel that continues the stories of characters like Ahsoka Tano, while also adopting storylines originally planned for The Clone Wars' scrapped eighth season. This was followed by Ahsoka (2023), a spin-off of The Mandalorian (2019–2023), which picks up where Rebels left off and further develops some of those unused storylines.

Additionally, on July 13, 2020, Star Wars: The Bad Batch, was announced as a spin-off, focusing on a squad of enhanced clones introduced in the seventh season. It premiered on Disney+ on May 4, 2021. Though a spin-off, the series also serves as a direct sequel, set during the early years of the Empire. On October 26, 2022, the animated anthology series Tales of the Jedi premiered on Disney+, continuing the stories of The Clone Wars. On April 18, 2025, during Star Wars Celebration, the animated series Star Wars: Maul – Shadow Lord was announced, which follows Maul as he reassembles his criminal empire while training a new apprentice on the planet Janix. The series takes place one year after the events of The Clone Wars series finale.

== Other media ==
=== The Clone Wars Legacy ===
After the series was cancelled in 2013, Darth Maul: Son of Dathomir, a four-issue comic miniseries based on completed scripts originally written for season six, was published between May 21 and August 20, 2014. It continues Maul's story following his defeat and capture by Darth Sidious in season five and it is the only Star Wars comic from Dark Horse Comics considered part of official canon.

Two unfinished story arcs from the canceled seventh season were released in story reel format on the official Star Wars website. The first arc, Crystal Crisis on Utapau, debuted on September 25, 2014, featuring full voice acting, music, and sound despite its rough animation. According to Pablo Hidalgo, it remains part of official canon. The second arc, The Bad Batch, premiered at Star Wars Celebration on April 17, 2015, and was released on the official website in May 2015.

An eight-episode arc featuring Asajj Ventress and Quinlan Vos, originally planned for season seven, was adapted into the canon novel Star Wars: Dark Disciple by Christie Golden, released on July 7, 2015. Another adaptation, Star Wars: The Clone Wars – Stories of Light and Dark, is a canon, young adult, anthology book released on August 25, 2020. It reimagines key episodes from the series through eleven short stories, each written by a different author. Ten of the stories retell major episodes and arcs, while one introduces a new tale set in the same era, with each story told from a character's point of view.

Additionally, Star Wars Adventures: The Clone Wars – Battle Tales, a five-issue comic series published by IDW Publishing in 2020, presents an anthology of war stories told by characters from the series. Written by Michael Moreci, with framing sequences by Derek Charm, each issue features a different artist and explores different theme.

=== Star Wars: Legends ===
Star Wars: Legends is the label for pre-2014 books, comics, games and other materials that were once part of the official timeline, known as the Expanded Universe. After Disney acquired Lucasfilm in 2012, these stories were rebranded in 2014 to make way for a new canon.

==== Selected printed materials ====
The series was accompanied by a comic book series of the same name, with artwork matching the series' visual style. (Note: In addition to comics and graphic novels, the series inspired a range of young reader books, including original stories and adaptations of key episodes.) Each issue included a main story and a "backup story," written and illustrated by various creators involved with the series, including Henry Gilroy and Dave Filoni. Published by Dark Horse Comics between September 2008 and January 2010, the twelve-issue run was later collected into three trade paperbacks. The first, Star Wars: The Clone Wars – Slaves of the Republic, became a New York Times bestseller and was the first Clone Wars comic to be adapted into an episode of the same name. It was followed by In Service of the Republic and Hero of the Confederacy. Additionally, a special issue was released for Free Comic Book Day in 2009. A separate four-issue miniseries, Darth Maul: Death Sentence, was released in July 2012, serving as a bridge between the events of seasons four and five of the series.

The series was also accompanied by a 23-chapter weekly webcomic of the same name, released exclusively on StarWars.com. Each chapter served as an introduction to that week's episode and was written to expand on the story. These first-season installments, which also tied into online Flash games, were later collected in a trade paperback titled Star Wars: Tales from The Clone Wars, published by Dreams & Visions Press in collaboration with Dark Horse Comics in August 2010. For the second season, the site introduced The Clone Wars: Act on Instinct, a standalone webcomic with an original story that occasionally tied into the show's events.

With the start of the third season, StarWars.com launched The Clone Wars: The Valsedian Operation, further expanding the series' narrative. Eleven quarterly graphic novels of the same name were also published by Dark Horse Comics to tie in with and expand upon the series. Written by various authors, including Gilroy, the novels were released between September 24, 2008, and June 19, 2013. (Note: Titles in the series include The Clone Wars: Shipyards of Doom, Crash Course, The Wind Raiders of Taloraan, The Colossus of Destiny, Deadly Hands of Shon-Ju, The Starcrusher Trap, Strange Allies, The Enemy Within, The Sith Hunters, Defenders of the Lost Temple, and The Smuggler's Code.)

==== Video games ====
On November 11, 2008, Star Wars: The Clone Wars – Lightsaber Duels, an action game for the Wii, was released. Developed by Krome Studios and published by LucasArts, it closely follows the film and series, presenting a sequence of duels where players can control various characters using the Wii Remote to simulate lightsaber movements. On the same day, Star Wars: The Clone Wars – Jedi Alliance was released for Nintendo DS, also by LucasArts, based on the TV series.

On October 6, 2009, Star Wars: The Clone Wars – Republic Heroes was released, developed by Lucasfilm Animation Singapore and Krome Studios and distributed by LucasArts. The game is set between the first and second seasons and allows players to control Jedi or clone troopers. Main antagonists include the bounty hunter Cad Bane, the Skakoan Kul Teska, and Count Dooku. On March 25, 2011, LEGO Star Wars III: The Clone Wars was released, the fourth installment in the LEGO video game series, based on the Clone Wars and covering the series, the film, and Episodes II and III. Main villains include Count Dooku, his apprentice Asajj Ventress, and General Grievous. The MMORPG Star Wars: Clone Wars Adventures launched on September 15, 2010, allowing players to create avatars and participate in mini-games to earn credits for gear and vehicles. The game was shut down on March 31, 2014.

In Disney Infinity 3.0, a toys-to-life video game released in September 2015, several characters from the series are playable as action figures using NFC technology. Each copy of the game includes the "Twilight of the Republic" playset, an alternate Clone Wars storyline with Anakin and Ahsoka. Characters from the series also appear in mobile games for Android and iOS, including Star Wars: Galactic Defense (October 2014), Star Wars: Galaxy of Heroes (November 2015), and Star Wars: Force Arena (January 2017). Some The Clone Wars characters were added in a DLC expansion for Star Wars Battlefront II.
