= Star Wars: The Clone Wars – Lightsaber Duels =

2008 video game

- North American cover art (pre-release)
- Developer: Krome Studios
- Publisher: LucasArts
- Director: Steve Stamatiadis
- Producers: Don Meadows; Ken Fox
- Designer: Kev Harrison
- Programmer: Chris Lacy
- Artist: Furio Tedeschi
- Composer: Kevin Kiner
- Series: Star Wars: The Clone Wars
- Platform: Wii
- Release: NA: November 11, 2008; EU: November 14, 2008; AU: November 19, 2008
- Genres: Fighting, adventure
- Modes: Single-player, multiplayer

Star Wars: The Clone Wars – Lightsaber Duels is a fighting video game developed by Krome Studios and published by LucasArts for the Wii. The game is based on Star Wars: The Clone Wars, and is the second Star Wars fighting game released, following Star Wars: Masters of Teräs Käsi (1997). The game was released on November 11, 2008, to coincide with the start of the series' first season. A companion game, Star Wars: The Clone Wars – Jedi Alliance, was released on the Nintendo DS on the same day. The game received generally mixed reviews.

== Plot ==
The events of the game's "Campaign Mode" take place during the film and select episodes from the first season of the television series, specifically "Duel of the Droids", "Cloak of Darkness", "Shadow of Malevolence", and "Destroy Malevolence", finishing with a scenario original to the game which involves Anakin Skywalker infiltrating a factory to hunt down and kill one of the newest Separatist Jedi hunting droids, EG-5.

== Characters ==
- Ahsoka Tano
- Anakin Skywalker
- Asajj Ventress
- Count Dooku
- EG-5
- General Grievous
- Kit Fisto
- Mace Windu
- Obi-Wan Kenobi
- Plo Koon

Many of the series' voice actors reprise their roles as their respective characters, including Ashley Eckstein, Matt Lanter, James Arnold Taylor, Matthew Wood, Corey Burton, Nika Futterman, Tom Kane, Phil LaMarr, and Terrence Carson.

== Gameplay ==
Lightsaber Duels makes use of the Wii Remote to simulate lightsaber combat. Players also use the Nunchuk to utilize Force powers to enhance their strength and manipulate objects in the duel arena while playing as a Jedi or Sith. Duels are fought one-on-one, with four levels of difficulty themed after the ranks of the Jedi Order for single-player battles against an opponent controlled by artificial intelligence. Each character has different attack combos, triggered by inputting a series of several Wii Remote gestures without interruption. Quick time events can also occur during a duel that a player can win by performing the correct gestures to deliver extra damage to the opponent. Duels are fought as a best-of-three series, implemented with dual health bars that deplete one after the other, similar to Killer Instinct, although the winner fully replenishes their current health bar when a round ends with one of the loser's health bars being fully depleted.

In "Campaign Mode", the player can only fight as Anakin Skywalker, Obi-Wan Kenobi and Ahsoka Tano, each in their costumes from the series. They battle against Asajj Ventress, Count Dooku, and General Grievous, plus a Jedi Hunter, named EG-5, a droid that is programmed to use a lightsaber.

In "Challenge Mode", the player is given the choice to play as any character in the game currently unlocked, and enter a series of duels in which specific goals are set. If they are met, a blue Jedi crest will appear at the end of the duel. Each character has four challenges. Some challenges are more difficult than others, but they unlock characters and some battlefields as well.

== Reception ==
Star Wars The Clone Wars: Lightsaber Duels received mixed reviews according to review aggregator Metacritic.

Reception

Aggregate score
Aggregator	Score
Metacritic	56/100

Review scores
Publication	Score
Eurogamer	2/10
Game Informer	5/10
GameSpot	6.5/10
GamesRadar+	2/5
IGN	5.3/10
VideoGamer.com	5/10

== See also ==
- Star Wars: Masters of Teräs Käsi
- Star Wars: The Clone Wars – Republic Heroes
