= Full House Poker =

2011 video game

- Developers: Microsoft Studios; Krome Studios
- Publisher: Microsoft Studios
- Platforms: Xbox 360 (XBLA), Windows Phone 7
- Release: March 16, 2011
- Genres: Card game, MMO
- Modes: Single-player, multiplayer

Full House Poker is a poker video game variant Texas hold 'em developed by Microsoft Studios and Krome Studios, published by Microsoft Game Studios and was released for Xbox 360 as an Xbox Live Arcade title and Windows Phone 7 on March 16, 2011. The game is the spiritual successor to 1 vs. 100 and features scheduled tournaments known as Texas Heat. Full House Poker also offers TV-style live poker events with season-long tournaments and more traditional Texas Hold Em' matchups with up to 30 human or computer-controlled players.

== Reception ==
Early reviews of the game were positive. TeamXbox gave the game a 7.7/10. Alex Keen of Crave Online praised the Avatar integration, but noted the lack of voice commentary and experienced a frozen table during a Texas Heat tournament. IGN gave the game an 8/10, praising the game's online mode, while comparing Texas Heat mode to 1 vs 100.

== See also ==
- World Series of Poker: Full House Pro
