= Ty the Tasmanian Tiger 2: Bush Rescue =

2004 platform video game

- European PlayStation 2 cover art
- Developers: Krome Studios; Halfbrick Studios (GBA version)
- Publishers: EA Games; Krome Studios (HD remaster)
- Directors: Steve Stamatiadis; John Passfield
- Producer: Lindsay Parmenter
- Designer: John Passfield
- Programmer: Steve Williams
- Artist: Bruno Rime
- Composer: George Stamatiadis
- Platforms: Game Boy Advance; GameCube; PlayStation 2; Xbox; Microsoft Windows; Nintendo Switch; PlayStation 4; Xbox One
- Release: Game Boy Advance, GameCube, PlayStation 2 & Xbox: NA: 12 October 2004; AU: 29 October 2004 (GCN); AU: 2 November 2004 (PS2, Xbox); EU: 5 November 2004; Microsoft Windows: WW: 13 December 2017; Nintendo Switch: NA: 30 March 2021; EU: 31 March 2021; Xbox One: WW: 23 June 2021; PlayStation 4: WW: 30 June 2021
- Genre: Platform
- Mode: Single-player

Ty the Tasmanian Tiger 2: Bush Rescue (stylized as TY the Tasmanian Tiger 2: Bush Rescue) is a 2004 3D platforming game developed by Krome Studios and published by EA Games for the GameCube, PlayStation 2 and Xbox systems, along with a 2D side-scrolling version of the game developed and released for the Game Boy Advance by Halfbrick. It is the sequel to Ty the Tasmanian Tiger and the second installment to the Ty the Tasmanian Tiger series.

The game was remastered in high-definition for Microsoft Windows and was made available through Steam in 2017. On January 14, 2021, Krome Studios announced the start of a Kickstarter campaign to fund the remastered versions for release on Nintendo Switch, Xbox One, and PlayStation 4. Reaching their target goal in less than 24 hours, the game was released on March 30, 2021 for the Nintendo Switch, on June 23, 2021 for the Xbox One and on June 30, 2021 for the PlayStation 4.

== Gameplay ==
Bush Rescue is set in Southern Rivers, a rural Australian countryside divided into many smaller areas, such as Bush Rescue HQ, the town of Burramudgee, and various other inhabited regions. Presented as a non-linear open world game, the player is given a degree of choice as to where to go and the order of what missions to accomplish. While most of the gameplay is on foot, the player is occasionally given a selection of vehicles and weapons to control, which include trucks, mechanical body suits known as "Bunyips," mortar launchers, helicopters, and go-karts.

The game progresses by completing missions, which range from helping town citizens, delivering items from one point to another, destroying mission-critical objects, and defeating certain enemies/bosses. After completing a handful of normal missions, the player is assigned a plot-critical mission, which progresses the game further and unlocks new areas upon completion. Ty's trademark weapons are his twin boomerangs, which can be thrown individually or together to defeat enemies, be used to perform a glide after jumping or falling, manipulate objects to create or clear pathways and utilize objects for maneuvers. Ty can also use a bite attack, which lunges himself at the nearest enemy, crate, or object with a large jaw chomp. It also allows him to reach hidden areas of objects by chaining bites together (Similar to the Homing Attack in Sonic games). New boomerangs can be purchased using Opals, the game's currency, at Sly's Boomerang Shop in Burramudgee, each with varying differences in combat effectiveness and functionality.

Multiplayer consists of Mario Kart–style go-kart racing, where players use various items to disrupt other racers as they compete to reach the finish line. The mode is playable split-screen with up to four players (two in the PS2 version).

While the story and overall gameplay remains the same as the console versions, the Game Boy Advance version plays as a 2D side-scrolling platformer as opposed to a fully 3D game. The game also is more restrictive, changing the open world vehicle exploration found in the console versions to an overworld map with enemies scattered throughout in real-time. Interacting with foes triggers a driving minigame where all enemies must be destroyed before being allowed to proceed, similar to Bionic Commando. Go-cart racing and all side quests associated with it were also completely removed, and no multiplayer modes are programmed in this version.

== Plot ==
Following from where the previous game left off, the Tasmanian tiger Ty defeats his Cassowary nemesis Boss Cass using his father's Doomerang given to him by his reformed brother Sly, destroying Cass's mech and retrieving the last missing talisman. After Ty returns the talisman to Rainbow Cliffs, his parents who were trapped in the alternate realm of "The Dream Time" during an earlier battle with Boss Cass return to the real world. Ty embraces his parents and Rainbow Cliffs is saved. Boss Cass is detained by police.

Later, Cass's henchmen lead an attack on the town of Currawong. Ty, his girlfriend Shazza the Dingo, Ranger Ken the Tasmanian Devil, and Duke the Kiwi arrive to assist Maurie the Cockatoo, Sly, and the local police in containing the situation. With Sly and Shazza, Ty fights his way into the city and halts advancing dropships and mechs using his own Battle Bunyip power suit. Cass's thorny devil henchwoman Fluffy arrives in her own Bunyip mech and makes her way towards Currawong Jail. Ty and Shazza realize that the attack on Currawong was a diversion so that Cass's henchmen could break him out of prison. Ty catches up with Fluffy and overpowers her. Ken and Duke arrive by helicopter to Ty's aid, but are subsequently shot down by Fluffy. Ty breaks off the fight to rescue his friends in the crashing helicopter, giving Fluffy the time to successfully break Boss Cass out of prison. After taunting Ty's efforts, Cass and Fluffy escape.

Two months later, Ty and his friends preside over a special inaugural ceremony, where Dennis the green tree frog announces the formation of "Bush Rescue", a peacekeeping organization based in Burramudgee dedicated to the protection of Southern Rivers. Ty and Shazza are then informed by Dennis that Boss Cass has founded his own country called "Cassopolis", and now possesses diplomatic immunity as a result of his leader status. Later on, while trying to stop a fire on the Wuli Wuli Oil Rig, Fluffy forces Ty to fight Buster (a giant robotic monster formed from hundreds of yellow nanobots joined). During the battle, Fluffy manages to steal an interface device known as a Shadow Drive from the rig and delivers it to Boss Cass, who uses the drive to create a genetically-modified bioweapon.

During his rematch against Fluffy on her coastal fortress, Ty steals a data module known as a Data N.U.T., which upon analysis shows Cass's evil plan to capture the people of Buramudgee and use them for the mass production of the bioweapon. Cass's minions attack Bush Rescue; while Ty is distracted during the battle, Cass manages to kidnap most of Burramudgee's mammal population. Ty, Sly, Shazza, and Duke fly to Cass's lair to stop him, with Shazza commandeering a standard Battle Bunyip, Sly using his custom-made Missile Bunyip, and Ty using the newly-constructed Shadow Bunyip. After eliminating most of Cass's henchmen, Sly and Shazza go to free the residents of Burramudgee while Ty goes to defeat Boss Cass. Just before he leaves, Ty kisses Shazza and says he will be alright.

Ty jumps down into a hole and encounters Cass in the heart of the island's volcano. He then summons a large number of green nanobots which join to form a long-armed robot (known as Armstrong in the GBA game). Ty destroys Armstrong and defeats Boss Cass. When they return to Buramudgee, Ty, Sly, and Shazza receive medals for their bravery from Dennis and Bush Rescue, while Boss Cass is sent back to prison to carry out lunch duty for all of his imprisoned henchmen. If the player achieves 100% completion, the bunyip elder Nandu Gili appears before Ty and Shazza through astral projection, and requests that the two teleport with him to The Dream Time for them to see something. When Ty passes through the portal, he is immediately spotted by three unknown creatures.

The story of the Game Boy Advance version remains mostly the same, with certain sequences such as the opening battle with Fluffy being altered. A boss fight against a malfunctioning Cy the Cybernetic Tiger which was teased during the previous game's post-credits scene is also added, although it bears little relevance to the overall plot.

== Reception ==
Reception

Aggregate score
Aggregator	Score
Metacritic	GBA: 63/100; GC: 70/100; PS2: 71/100; XBOX: 69/100

Review scores
Publication	Score
GameSpot	7/10
IGN	7/10
Nintendo Life	8/10

Edit on Wikidata

Ty the Tasmanian Tiger 2: Bush Rescue received "mixed or average" reviews, according to review aggregator Metacritic. GameSpot gave the game a 7 out of 10 and said, "Older audiences probably won't be engaged by it, but Ty 2 should be easily appreciated by juvenile platformer fans." IGN also gave it a 7 out of 10 and said, "Overall, Ty the Tasmanian Tiger 2: Bush Rescue succeeds as a simple, lighthearted platformer. It lacks the challenge and depth of other titles in the genre, namely Super Mario Sunshine and Sly 2: Band of Thieves, but offers nifty features like sprawling environments and a unique style to help offset its deficiencies"

== Remaster ==
A remastered version of the game titled Ty the Tasmanian Tiger 2: Bush Rescue HD was released for the Nintendo Switch in March 2021 following a successful Kickstarter crowdfunding campaign. It was released for North America on 30 March 2021. On the following day, it was released for Europe, Australia and New Zealand regions. It was also released for the Xbox One on June 23, and for the PlayStation 4 on June 30. A special edition of the physical release of Ty the Tasmanian Tiger HD, which included the remastered sequel, was released on 15 October 2021 for Nintendo Switch.

== Sequel ==
In May 2005, Activision and Krome Studios signed a co-publishing agreement for the third installment of the series: Ty the Tasmanian Tiger 3: Night of the Quinkan. It was released in October the next year.
