= World Series of Poker: Full House Pro =

2013 video game

- Developer: Pipeworks Studios
- Publisher: Microsoft Game Studios
- Engine: Unity
- Platforms: Windows 8, Xbox 360
- Release: September 4, 2013
- Genre: Card game
- Modes: Single-player, multiplayer

World Series of Poker: Full House Pro is a 2013 video game poker variant Texas hold 'em developed by Pipeworks Studios, published by Microsoft Games Studios for Xbox 360 as an Xbox Live Arcade title and Windows 8. The game is the sequel to Full House Poker using the World Series of Poker license. The game was released globally on September 4, 2013.

The game is available free of charge on Xbox Live, and players get free bonus chips every 12 hours, and even more if they claim the bonus chips consecutively. Players can also purchase chips and gold with real money; chips can be spent in games or in the in-game store, and gold is used to purchase exclusive items.

Pipeworks Studios announced that the servers for World Series of Poker: Full House Pro would close on March 4, 2015, and the game is now delisted from the marketplace. During the hiatus, the servers for the game were shut down at 12 pm PST on March 4, 2015.
