= Ty the Tasmanian Tiger 4 =

2015 platform video game

- Steam storefront header
- Developer: Krome Studios
- Publisher: Krome Studios
- Composer: George Stamatiadis
- Platforms: Windows, Nintendo Switch
- Release: Windows: WW: 17 September 2015; Nintendo Switch: WW: 26 September 2023
- Genre: Platform
- Mode: Single-player

Ty the Tasmanian Tiger 4 (stylized as TY the Tasmanian Tiger 4) is a 2015 side-scrolling platform video game developed and published by Krome Studios for Windows and Nintendo Switch. It is the sequel to Ty the Tasmanian Tiger 3: Night of the Quinkan and the fourth installment to the Ty the Tasmanian Tiger series. Unlike its predecessors, the game plays as a 2D side-scrolling platformer, similar to the Game Boy Advance versions of previous games.

== Gameplay ==
Ty the Tasmanian Tiger 4 retains various elements from previous games in the series, such as collecting opals and acquiring new boomerangs to use as weapons. The gameplay has shifted towards a 2-dimensional side-scroller style, very similar to the Game Boy Advance versions of the game's two prequels, with an adventure spanning over 40 levels. Unlike in previous games, the player gets to play as multiple characters from the Bush Rescue team, including Ty, Sly, Shazza and Dennis, as they travel through the various areas in Burramudgee.

== Plot ==
After saving Southern Rivers from the plight of the Quinkan in the previous game, Ty and the Bush Rescue team have since regrouped and relocated their headquarters to the town of "Coolarangah" on the shores of Lake Burramudgee. Recently, Ty's old cassowary nemesis Boss Cass set up a resort island named "Cassablanca," which leads into a series of strange occurrences including a shadowy figure lurking around the town.

== Reception ==
Reception

Aggregate score
Aggregator	Score
Metacritic	7.0/10

Ty the Tasmanian Tiger 4 received mixed to positive reviews. Notably, the game did not receive as much coverage as the three preceding games. Points of contention include the game's short length, lack of innovation, and what is felt to be a noticeable downgrade from 3D to 2D. Another issue was that the previous 2D entries in the series, which were on the Game Boy Advance, were considered more fun.

== Remaster ==
A remastered version of the game, titled Ty the Tasmanian Tiger 4: Bush Rescue Returns, was announced in September 2022 for the Nintendo Switch to mark the series' 20th anniversary, and was released on September 26, 2023.
