= Championship Surfer =

2000 video game

- European Dreamcast cover art
- Developer: Krome Studios
- Publishers: NA: Mattel Interactive; PAL: GAME Studios
- Platforms: Microsoft Windows, Dreamcast, PlayStation
- Release: Windows: NA: November 20, 2000; Dreamcast, PlayStation: NA: December 4, 2000; EU: August 10, 2001 (DC); EU: October 19, 2001 (PS)
- Genre: Sports
- Modes: Single-player, multiplayer

Championship Surfer is an extreme sports video game developed by Krome Studios, published by Mattel Interactive in North American and GAME Studios in Europe, and released for Microsoft Windows, PlayStation and Dreamcast in 2000.

== Gameplay ==
The title offers various modes including Arcade, Championship, Free Surf, Time Attack, King of the Waves and Rumble, and supports up to four players. The Championship mode uses scoring methods compliant with the Association of Surfing Professionals methodology.

Players can select from one of eight real-life surfers including Cory Lopez, Shane Beschen, Jason Collins and Rochelle Ballard, with the game taking place on a fictional South Pacific Island with ten selectable beach locations, each with waves possessing their own unique breaking style and size, as well as varying weather conditions.

== Development ==
Brisbane-based company Krome Studios led development of the title, and claimed to be "staffed with avid surfers, including current Australian national champion Mark "Richo" Richardson" who informed "development and implementation of wave dynamics, board dynamics, and the moves of the featured surfers in the game".

The game was originally announced in April 2000 as Billabong Pro Surfing, but would ultimately be released with the endorsement of rival surfwear company O'Neill.

== Reception ==
Reception

Aggregate score
Aggregator	Score		
Aggregator	Dreamcast	PC	PS
Metacritic	61/100	47/100	57/100

Review scores
Publication	Score		
Publication	Dreamcast	PC	PS
CNET Gamecenter	N/A	4/10	N/A
Computer Games Strategy Plus	N/A	3/5	N/A
Electronic Gaming Monthly	N/A	N/A	4/10
EP Daily	7.5/10	N/A	N/A
Game Informer	5/10	N/A	7/10
GameRevolution	C	N/A	N/A
GameSpot	7.2/10	5.3/10	7.3/10
GameSpy	8/10	N/A	N/A
GameZone	N/A	8.5/10	N/A
IGN	3.4/10	7.1/10	7.3/10
Next Generation	3/5	N/A	N/A
Official U.S. PlayStation Magazine	N/A	N/A	3/5
PC Gamer (US)	N/A	69%	N/A

The Dreamcast and PlayStation versions received "mixed" reviews, while the PC version received "generally unfavorable reviews", according to the review aggregation website Metacritic. Daniel Erickson of NextGen said that the Dreamcast version was "Easily the best next-generation surfing game so far." Atomic Dawg of GamePro said that the same console version "trades on the strength of an impressive game engine that truly makes you feel like you're gliding across the waves. While the game promises a lot, however, it doesn't quite deliver." (Note: GamePro gave the Dreamcast version 4.5/5 for graphics, two 3.5/5 scores for sound and fun factor, and 4/5 for control.)
