= Star Wars: The Clone Wars – Jedi Alliance =

2008 video game

- North American cover art
- Developer: LucasArts Singapore
- Publisher: LucasArts
- Series: Star Wars: The Clone Wars
- Platform: Nintendo DS
- Release: NA: November 11, 2008; EU: November 14, 2008; AU: November 19, 2008
- Genre: Adventure
- Mode: Single-player

Star Wars: The Clone Wars – Jedi Alliance is an action-adventure game developed and published by LucasArts. It was released for the Nintendo DS on November 11, 2008. It is set in the science fiction universe of Star Wars and is a tie-in to the Clone Wars TV series. A companion game for the Wii, Star Wars: The Clone Wars – Lightsaber Duels, was released on the same day.

== Gameplay ==
Jedi Alliance utilizes the Nintendo DS touch screen for movement, combat and quick time events. Here the player has completed a left-to-right swipe which causes the character to jump to the next ledge.

The game utilizes complete use of the Nintendo DS stylus to control the characters' movements and actions, especially during lightsaber combat; there are also special action sequences in which the player must complete quick-time events by quickly making the correct stylus strokes on-screen to help the characters avoid a dangerous situation. Lightsaber attacks are executed with rapid taps of the stylus, with three unique attack positions (low, middle and high), and players must perform even faster taps to overpower enemies with melee weapons and make them vulnerable to attacks. Each character has special lightsaber combo moves that can occur if the player inputs a particular sequence of 4 attacks at differing positions, such as middle-middle-high-high. Certain hands-on activities that the characters must perform, such as cutting a hole through a door or hacking control panels, are experienced as minigames that are mainly played with dragging motions of the stylus, as opposed to tapping.

Jedi Alliance features nine levels in which the player must select two of the following six Jedi characters —Anakin Skywalker, Ahsoka Tano, Obi-Wan Kenobi, Mace Windu, Plo Koon, and Kit Fisto—to proceed through a story original to the game. There are two types of Jedi, combat and environmental, and the player is encouraged to use different combinations of Jedi type pairs (combat-combat, combat-environmental or environmental-environmental) to uncover new areas and collectibles throughout the game. Collecting Force orbs will charge up a powerful Force attack to inflict massive damage on an enemy; the amount of orbs needed to charge it and the damage it inflicts for a particular Jedi pair will increase every time the player completes a level with it. During some moments, R2-D2 and C-3PO are also playable, though their abilities are limited. As the player completes levels, as well as each of their 9 side objectives (such as getting through the level without dying or finding all of a particular collectible), they can unlock new costumes for the characters, concept art for the game and special cheats.

== Plot ==
As the Clone Wars gets underway, Luminara Unduli's Jedi corvette, the Sedawan, suddenly falls under attack to mysterious assailants en route to Coruscant while carrying a shipment of kyber crystals. Her clone troopers manage to broadcast a distress transmission to the Jedi Temple back on the planet. The Jedi High Council dispatches Anakin Skywalker and Ahsoka Tano to investigate the Sedawan. They discover that all the escape pods were jettisoned to unknown destinations, the crystals are gone and that the assailants are Nightsisters, a clan of alien witches from the planet Dathomir, whom they catch escaping from the hangar and briefly engage in a lightsaber duel with.

After Skywalker and Tano are able to track the Nightsisters as they escaped the Sedawan to the planet Rodia, the Council sends two Jedi and some clone troopers to the planet and are promptly impeded by a shield that the former are able to sneak into and work on to weaken, swimming through underwater passages and battling a Kwazel Maw along the way. They eventually go underground, riding a high-speed train of sorts and battling Nightsisters along the way. Just as the clones manage to disable the shield, the Jedi find Nightsister Yansu Grjak tapping into the power of a large kyber crystal in a cavern deep into the planet and kill her in battle.

During the two Jedi's mission to Rodia, the Council decides to ask Ziro the Hutt if he knew anything about the matter, only to hear that even Padmé Amidala could not reach him. The Council sends another pair of Jedi, along with C-3PO and R2-D2, to investigate his hideout. After battling hostile droids, they find Ziro being held hostage by Asajj Ventress, who flees after a duel. Another mysterious Nightsister, Ros Lai, then appears and promises more information about the Nightsisters that attacked the Sedawan, revealing that they are indeed collaborating with Count Dooku and the Separatists and they are mining more crystals from the planet Christophsis.

The Council dispatches another pair of Jedi to the planet to not only investigate and stop the mining operation, but also rescue Amidala and clone troopers captured in the war zone. They do so successfully after facing danger from getting their gunship shot down and having to fight many Nightsisters. As they go deeper into the Separatist mining compound, they enlist the assistance of C-3PO and R2-D2 to hack into its main computer and obtain data about what the crystals are being used for to send back to the Council. They discover that the crystals are being used for a superweapon aboard a ship that could turn the tide against the Galactic Republic.

Having determined that Ros Lai's data was incomplete, Grand Master Yoda sends another pair of Jedi to the planet Dathomir to learn more about the Nightsisters, escorted by clone troopers. They then raid a Nightsister temple, battling more Nightsisters along the way, before they are ambushed and incapacitated by a very powerful Nightsister. After they recover from the attack, Yoda alerts them about the Nightsisters' evil plan, as well as their ability to use their magick to charge the crystals. They then fight a rancor, battle more Nightsisters and eventually find Luminara held hostage. Just as they free her, the same powerful Nightsister that tried to kill them appears. She reveals that she is Sai Sircu and that the superweapon is almost ready aboard the Separatist ship Devastator.

The Council then sends all six playable Jedi to the Devastator to destroy the superweapon. Just before they arrive, Dooku and Ventress attempt to test the weapon on Dathomir, incensing Sircu and breaking the Sith's alliance with the Nightsisters. The Jedi then battle Dooku and Asajj to sabotage the weapon as the Devastator comes to Coruscant, with Skywalker and Windu reaching the main weapon chamber for a final confrontation with Sircu. After they defeat her, Sircu explodes, destroying both the giant kyber crystal in the superweapon, as well as the Devastator itself, which the Jedi are able to safely flee with their mission accomplished.

== Development ==
Following the release of The Clone Wars animated series, the game features a new original story set in the series continuity. Jedi Alliance was produced alongside the animated TV series in the same studio in Singapore, and features the same voice actors, which recorded over 3,500 lines of dialogue for the game that were translated into several languages. The game was originally planned to be titled Day of the Nightsisters, in reference to LucasArts' classic, Maniac Mansion: Day of the Tentacle. The game's never-before-seen antagonists, the Nightsisters, were first introduced in The Courtship of Princess Leia, and were later reintroduced in the TV series as allies of the Separatists. A regular shadow technique on the Nintendo DS was a simple dark circle, but the development team wanted something more realistic, overcoming the hardware's limitations to create better shadowing. The completed game took up 256 megabytes of space on the Nintendo DS Game Card. Star Wars: The Clone Wars – Lightsaber Duels for the Wii and Jedi Alliance were both released at the same time to coincide with the airing of the first season of the Star Wars: The Clone Wars animated series. Prima Games published an official reversible one-volume strategy guide for both games on the same release date, with one side of the guide covering Lightsaber Duels and the other covering Jedi Alliance.

== Reception ==
Reception

Aggregate score
Aggregator	Score
Metacritic	68/100

Review scores
Publication	Score
Game Informer	6.75/10
GamesRadar+	3/5
IGN	8/10
Pocket Gamer	3.5/5

Critics pointed out that it was a very well made action game, from designs to details, music and sound. PAL GN praised the game for having a strong story, solid visuals and great implementation of voiced dialogue, but criticized the game-play for being overly simplistic and its combat system inefficient.
