= Ty the Tasmanian Tiger =

2002 platform video game

- North American PlayStation 2 cover art
- Developer: Krome Studios
- Publishers: Electronic Arts; Krome Studios (HD remaster)
- Director: John Passfield
- Producer: Andy Green
- Designers: John Passfield; Steve Stamatiadis
- Programmers: Enam Faroni; Steve Williams
- Composer: George Stamatiadis
- Platforms: GameCube; PlayStation 2; Xbox; Windows; Nintendo Switch; PlayStation 4; Xbox One
- Release: GameCube, PlayStation 2, Xbox; NA: 9 October 2002; EU: 22 November 2002; Windows; WW: 12 December 2016; Nintendo Switch; NA: 31 March 2020; EU: 3 April 2020; AU: 4 April 2020; PlayStation 4; WW: 25 July 2020; Xbox One; WW: 14 October 2020
- Genre: Platform
- Mode: Single-player

Ty the Tasmanian Tiger (stylized as TY the Tasmanian Tiger) is a 2002 platform video game developed by Krome Studios and published by Electronic Arts for the GameCube, PlayStation 2 and Xbox systems. The game was remastered in HD for Windows and was made available through Steam in 2016. A remastered version published by Krome Studios was also developed for the Nintendo Switch, PlayStation 4, Xbox One, and Xbox Series X/S. The Nintendo Switch version released in North America in March 2020, and in Europe, Australia, and New Zealand the following month. The PlayStation 4 version was released on 25 July 2020. The Xbox One version was released on 14 October 2020.

The first installment in the Ty the Tasmanian Tiger series, the game is set on a fictional Australian island and follows the titular character Ty as he searches for "Thunder Eggs" to power a machine to locate five scattered talismans and free his family, who are trapped in an alternate realm known as "The Dreaming" by the series antagonist Boss Cass, a cassowary plotting world domination. Development of Ty the Tasmanian Tiger began in 2000 with five developers from Krome Studios. The development team was later expanded to 45 people. For the levels in the game, the developers got inspiration from the Australian Outback.

Ty the Tasmanian Tiger was initially revealed in 2002 at the Electronic Entertainment Expo convention in Los Angeles, California. The game received mixed reviews from critics. It sold over one million copies worldwide. Three sequels were produced: Ty the Tasmanian Tiger 2: Bush Rescue, Ty the Tasmanian Tiger 3: Night of the Quinkan and Ty the Tasmanian Tiger 4.

== Gameplay ==
Ty the Tasmanian Tiger is a platform game in which the player controls the titular character Ty, who is tasked with gathering mystical artifacts known as "Thunder Eggs" in order to power the Talisman Machine, a teleportation device that will locate five mystical talismans which will in turn have the power to free his family from the Dreaming, which an evil character named Boss Cass opened to seal all mammals. The game takes place in "Rainbow Cliffs", which is divided into a series of "zones", each of which act as the hub areas of the game. Each zone contains three portals which lead to a level, similar to Crash Bandicoot. The goal of each level is to obtain Thunder Eggs, which can be retrieved by either performing a certain task, completing a "Time Attack" challenge that can be unlocked upon a level's completion, freeing five bilbies (a group of animals who raised Ty after his parents were imprisoned), or by being found alongside the level's set path. A level is cleared either by collecting a select number of Thunder Eggs and reaching the end of the path, or beating certain mini-games, each will return Ty to Rainbow Cliffs. Retrieving a Thunder Egg in a level will cause it to appear on the game's pause menu. When at least 17 Thunder Eggs in a zone are obtained, the player navigates their way to the Talisman Machine; after the machine manages to locate a talisman, it opens another portal leading to their original locations; inside these portals, the player must fight and defeat a boss before gaining access to a new zone.

The player is given four units of health, although this can be increased with power-ups, which are lost when Ty is attacked by an enemy or falls from a great height. When all units of health are lost the player loses a life and is returned to the last checkpoint passed. Losing all lives results in a game over, returning the player to the hubworld, where they can restart the last level. Ty has the ability to jump into the air and uses both biting and throwing his trademark dual boomerangs as his primary means of defense. The player begins the game with two wooden boomerangs, but can gradually increase their collection by finding secret areas, or collecting 15 "Golden Cogs" scattered throughout each level and trading them to Ty's scientist koala friend Julius, who creates a new "techno-rang" for the player to use. Another method of retrieving a new boomerang is to complete a boss level, after which Julius will harness the excess energy of the Talisman Machine in order to create a new "elemental boomerang", each of which possess elemental powers that can be used to gain access to a new zone. Like elemental-rangs, each techno-rang possesses a unique ability, and can alternatively be used to defeat enemies or retrieve Golden Cogs or Thunder Eggs more efficiently. In early levels of the game, Ty can swim via doggie paddle; however, following the third level, "Ship Rex", the player gains the ability to swim faster and more efficiently as well as dive underwater from lifeguard platypus character Rex; in addition, Rex gives the player "Aquarangs", boomerangs used exclusively for attacking underwater.

== Plot ==
Deep within the Australian region of Southern Rivers, a young and energetic anthropomorphic Tasmanian tiger orphan named Ty is playing tag with one of his adoptive Bilby siblings when he falls into a deep cave. Waiting for help to arrive, Ty stumbles across a mural depicting a battle between a group of tasmanian tigers, a bird-like creature, and a colossal ape-like mecha. Ty's ironbark boomerang, which once belonged to his biological mother, begins to glow as a spectral figure appears before Ty. Introducing himself as Nandu Gili, the figure tells Ty that many years ago, an evil cassowary known as Boss Cass made an attempt to steal five mystical talismans which act as keys to access a mystical alternate dimension known as "The Dreaming" which Nandu Gili watches over and protects, in order to conquer the world. A group of boomerang-wielding tasmanian tigers, including Ty's parents, intercept Cass and fight against his giant mecha suit for control of the talismans. After a fierce battle, Cass uses one of the talismans to open a portal into The Dreaming, sucking in and imprisoning the tasmanian tigers. Before he is sucked into the portal himself, Ty's father dislodges the remaining talismans from their pedestals using his custom fly-by-wire boomerang, the "Doomerang", resulting in an explosion that collapses the portal to The Dreaming, destroying Cass' mecha and scattering the talismans across Southern Rivers. Nandu Gili then informs Ty that Cass is plotting to reacquire the talismans and tasks him with finding the talismans before Boss Cass does and rescuing his family from the Dreaming. Ty's cockatoo friend Maurie then appears and helps Ty out of the cave. After telling him the story, Maurie agrees to accompany Ty on his adventures to find the talisman and stop Cass.

Ty and Maurie head over to the Bli-Bli Station outpost in the Rainbow Cliffs region of Southern Rivers, where the pair meet with Maurie's koala scientist friend Julius, who informs the two that he's developed a teleportation device which can locate and teleport the talismans to their current location. To do so, Ty is tasked with finding a significant number of elemental geode-like rocks known as "Thunder Eggs" in order to supply power to the teleportation device. Using portals created by Julius, Ty travels across Southern Rivers in search of fire-imbued Thunder Eggs. Along the way, Ty finds a second ironbark boomerang near a billabong and provides assistance to the residents of Southern Rivers, including his dingo girlfriend Shazza and his tasmanian devil park ranger friend Ranger Ken. Ty then travels to the Great Barrier Reef and meets up with his lifeguard platypus friend Rex who teaches him how to swim and provides him with a pair of boomerangs that work underwater known as Aquarangs. Eventually, Ty acquires enough Fire Thunder Eggs to power Julius' teleportation device, which locates and teleports the first talisman to their location. Attempting to grab it, Ty and the talisman are accidentally sucked into a portal leading to the Australian outback where they encounter a giant hostile boar named Bull. After a brief scuffle, Ty pacifies Bull after tricking him into slamming into multiple termite mounds, securing the first talisman. During this time, Boss Cass is overseeing a excavation in search of the missing talismans when one of his frill lizard henchmen recovers one of them.

Using the residual energy from the Fire Thunder Eggs, Julius creates a pair of new fire-imbued Flamerangs for Ty, which he uses to access the next region of Southern Rivers in search of ice-imbued Thunder Eggs for the teleportation device. Unbeknownst to Ty, he is stalked by Sly, a mysterious tasmanian tiger working for Cass. Sly then returns to Cass and informs him of Ty's activities, to which Cass mockingly begins phase 2 of his plan of reacquiring the talismans. In search of the Ice Thunder Eggs, Ty continues to provide assistance the residents of Southern Rivers, including helping Maurie's friend Dennis, a cowardly green tree frog, get back to his home in the billabong and rescuing a family of koala children lost high in the Snowy Mountains. After gathering enough Ice Thunder Eggs, Julius powers his teleportation device and locates another of the missing talismans. Ty is once again teleported as he attempts to grab the talisman, this time being sent to the Great Barrier Reef where he encounters a cybernetically augmented shark enslaved by Boss Cass named Crickey. Using discarded oxygen canisters, Ty destroys Crickey's cybernetic components, freeing the shark from Cass' control and securing the second talisman. Upon learning of this news from his henchmen, an enraged Boss Cass sends Sly to intercept and eliminate Ty.

Ty is given a pair of Frostyrangs by Julius created using the leftover power from the Ice Thunder Eggs and is then tasked with finding a final set of lightning-imbued Thunder Eggs to find the next talisman. Making his way through the Australian rainforest, Ty encounters a lyrebird named Lenny, who sends Ty on a wild goose chase to a water treatment facility to rescue a prisoner of Boss Cass named Princess Orchid. Upon arriving at the location, Ty is ambushed by Sly and the two fight. After a fierce battle, Ty defeats Sly, who vows to defeat Ty during their next encounter before escaping. Ty continues to provide assistance to his friends while searching for the Lightning Thunder Eggs, including rescuing the koala children from bushfires on the Snowy Mountain and by taking care of Boss Cass' frill lizard henchman that had been disturbing residents of the Great Barrier Reef using their Jet Skis. Ty gathers enough Lighting Thunder Eggs to power Julius' device once more, which locates another missing talisman. Ty and the talisman are teleported to the Snowy Mountains, where they encounter one of Cass' underlings, an unnamed female thorny devil (later known as Fluffy in Bush Rescue) piloting her own ape-like mecha suit. Ty defeats Fluffy's mech, forcing her to retreat and earning Ty another talisman. During this time, Boss Cass' henchmen are able to locate the second and final talisman.

Infuriated at the loss of another talisman, Boss Cass hatches a scheme to lure Ty to his secret base and defeat him using his rebuilt mecha suit and take all the talismans for himself. Using the leftover energy from the Lightning Thunder Eggs, Julius gives Ty the most powerful elemental boomerangs of all, the Zappyrangs, and is sent to the outskirts of Boss Cass' secret base to retrieve the final two talismans. Ty encounters Shazza again, revealing that one of the Frill Lizards Ty defeated earlier had dropped one of the missing talismans. Before she's able to give it to Ty, Shazza is kidnapped by another of Cass' henchwomen, an unnamed Ghost Bat (known as Shadow in Bush Rescue) who takes her deeper into the facility. Ty gives chase and defeats Shadow, and both reclaim the missing talisman and free Shazza, who gives him a kiss before escaping. Before he faces Boss Cass, Ty runs into Sly, who challenges him to a battle. After dispatching him, Ty saves Sly from falling into a pool of magma. A deeply conflicted Sly retreats once again as Ty hops onto Boss Cass' repaired mecha as it begins leaving the facility.

Boss Cass begins mocking Ty as the two engage in a battle atop his mecha, with Ty managing to blow off the head of the mecha. Unable to completely destroy the rampaging mecha, Sly suddenly appears, betraying Boss Cass and giving Ty his father's Doomerang. Ty then guides the Doomerang to the core of Cass' mecha, destroying it. Ty, Sly and Shazza all manage to escape and make it safely down to the surface of Rainbow Cliffs while Cass and the final missing talisman are both forcibly ejected from the ruined mecha. Nandu Gili appears and places the final talisman on the pedestal, opening a portal to The Dreaming and freeing Ty's parents, who warmly embrace Ty. If the player achieves 100% completion, a post-credits scene plays showing a cybernetic tasmanian tiger closely resembling Ty being activated in a secret facility.

== Development ==
Development of Ty the Tasmanian Tiger began in December 2000, originally consisting of five developers at Krome Studios. The development team was later expanded to 40 people and also included a quality assurance team of 15 members. In designing the 16 large levels, the team drew inspiration from the Australian landscapes. According to designer John Passfield, he said that his favorite boomerang in the game was the Kaboomerang. The team also implemented real time lighting effects, and Passfield cited that it "affects Ty [throughout the game] and changes the direction of his shadow, plus the world reflects in ice cubes and shiny surfaces" and he also loved the animation system used in the game. He also cited that he was proud of the "Emergent Game Play" system used throughout the game, and said that "during focus testing [of the game] it was great when players had 'stumbled across' a new way to solve a problem".

Ty the Tasmanian Tiger was first announced by Electronic Arts on 10 May 2002, and the game was later unveiled at the 2002 Electronic Entertainment Expo convention to positive response. On 17 July 2002, Electronic Arts announced that the game would also be developed for the Xbox.

== Reception ==
Reception

Aggregate score
Aggregator	Score
Metacritic	(PS2) 70/100 (GC) 69/100 (Xbox) 68/100 (HD; Switch) 70/100

Review scores
Publication	Score
AllGame	(Xbox)
Eurogamer	5/10
GamePro	3.5/5
GameSpot	7.5/10
IGN	(PS2) 7.9/10 (Xbox) 7.8/10 (GC) 6.8/10

Ty the Tasmanian Tiger received "mixed or average" reviews, according to review aggregator Metacritic. Matthew Gallant of GameSpot concluded that the game is "great for younger players and can provide a satisfying experience for teens and adults as long as they don't mind their replay value coming from finding every last collectible in the game." In reviewing the PlayStation 2 version of the game, Jeremy Dunham and Kaiser Hwang of IGN concluded that the game is "a Crash Bandicoot clone through and through" and also said that "Krome Studios own attempt at platforming is still enough to warrant a purchase from diehard genre fans." In a review of the Xbox version, Hwang said that it "makes no effort in hiding its influences" and that the game "is a Mario clone through and through, just done really well."

The gameplay received mixed responses. Kaiser Hwang commented that the game "borrows heavily from the Mario series." However he complained that one of the "irritating things about the game is that every time you start your game and begin a level, the game insists on showing you the same cutscene and voiceover." He also said that the game has "clever puzzles, and the levels have a good variety to them." Kilo Watt of GamePro said that controlling Ty is "a bit cumbersome with jumping being particularly tough to get a handle on." He also cited the camera angles as problematic, as well as detecting collisions in the game.

The game sold over one million copies worldwide. The PlayStation 2 version of the game was re-released for the Greatest Hits budget lineup in 2003.

== Remaster ==
Krome Studios organized a successful Kickstarter crowdfunding campaign for a remastered version of the original game titled Ty the Tasmanian Tiger HD. It was released on the Nintendo Switch in North America, available from the Nintendo eShop on 31 March 2020. It was released in Europe on 3 April and in Australia and New Zealand on 4 April. It was also released for the PlayStation 4 on 25 July 2020 and for the Xbox One on 14 October 2020. It was announced to be playable on the upcoming Xbox Series X/S as well.

A physical version of the remaster was released for Xbox One, PlayStation 4 and Nintendo Switch on 15 October 2021. A special edition for Nintendo Switch containing Ty the Tasmanian Tiger 2: Bush Rescue HD was released on the same day.

== Sequels ==
Ty the Tasmanian Tiger was followed by two sequels, Ty the Tasmanian Tiger 2: Bush Rescue and Ty the Tasmanian Tiger 3: Night of the Quinkan, for the PlayStation 2, GameCube, Xbox and Game Boy Advance and developed by Krome Studios. In May 2005, Activision and Krome Studios signed a co-publishing agreement for the third installment of the series: Ty the Tasmanian Tiger 3: Night of the Quinkan. It was released in October the next year.

On 27 July 2012, Krome announced plans for a new Ty The Tasmanian Tiger game to be developed for the iOS to coincide with the series's 10th anniversary, this game was revealed to be Ty the Tasmanian Tiger: Boomerang Blast, released late 2012. On 11 March 2013, Krome Studios announced a 2D Ty title to be released on 24 July 2013 on Xbox Games for Windows 8 PC and/or Tablet. Ty the Tasmanian Tiger 4 was originally released on Xbox Games for Windows 8 PC and tablets titled Ty the Tasmanian Tiger in 2013 then ported to Steam for Windows as Ty the Tasmanian Tiger 4 in 2015. It was released on 18 September 2015.

== Canceled television series ==
It was announced in 2004 that Film Roman and Krome Studios was developing an animated series based on the video game series. No further reports, however, have been made since then, and the project is believed to be cancelled.

== Notes ==
- Krome Studios Staff (2002). Ty the Tasmanian Tiger Instruction Booklet. EA Games.
