= Krome Studios =

Australian video game developer

Krome Studios Pty Ltd.
- Type: Private
- Industry: Video games
- Predecessor: Interactive Binary Illusions (1993–1996); Gee Whiz! Entertainment (1996–1999)
- Founded: 1999
- Founders: Robert Walsh; Steve Stamatiadis; John Passfield
- Headquarters: Fortitude Valley, Queensland, Australia
- Key people: Robert Walsh (chief executive officer, co-founder); Steve Stamatiadis (creative director, co-founder); Lindsay Parmenter (head of development)
- Number of employees: 350 (2009)
- Website: www.kromestudios.com

Krome Studios Pty Ltd. is an Australian video game developer. Its headquarters were in Brisbane and it previously had offices in Adelaide and Melbourne (Krome Studios Melbourne). Krome Studios is best known for its Ty the Tasmanian Tiger games and for its work on the Spyro the Dragon series.

Krome has created games for the Xbox, GameCube, Wii, Game Boy Advance, Dreamcast, PlayStation, PlayStation 2, Macintosh and PC. It has also developed for Xbox 360, PlayStation 3, PlayStation Portable, Windows Phone 7 and iOS. More recently, Krome has developed games for Xbox One, PlayStation 4, Nintendo Switch and Nintendo Switch 2.

== History ==
The company was founded in 1999 by Robert Walsh, who is the current CEO, Steve Stamatiadis, the creative director and John Passfield, the design director who left the company in 2005.

In 2007, Krome Studios placed on the Develop 100 List at #94, being the only Australian game development studio to make the list that year after releasing The Legend of Spyro: A New Beginning the year before (2006). Three years later in 2010, Krome Studios was awarded the number 52 spot. Also in that year, Krome Studios entered into a technology sharing agreement with Emergent Game Technologies.

On 18 August 2010, it was reported that Krome had closed down its Adelaide studios and made significant staff cuts to its Melbourne and Brisbane offices, with as many as 100 staff let go. On 18 October 2010, it was reported that all remaining staff were let go; however, on 1 November, CEO Robert Walsh responded to an email sent by IGN stating that Krome Studios had not closed down.

In July 2012, Krome Studios re-opened its website, which had remained dormant since its fall in 2010, and announced that Ty the Tasmanian Tiger would return. Since then, Krome has developed two games based on Ty the Tasmanian Tiger for iOS and PC. They have also developed several other titles for iOS, including Playmaker and Whole Wide World (for the child learning company, Fingerprint) and Toy Soldiers: Boot Camp, on Windows Phone 7.

In March 2016, Krome Studios re-released a PC remastered port of Ty the Tasmanian Tiger on Steam Early Access for the PC only, with increased resolution textures and new lighting, shadow and reflection effects, which left early access that December. They would go on to do the same with Bush Rescue and Night of the Quinkan in each following year respectively.

== Games developed ==
=== Windows ===
- Mike Stewart's Pro Bodyboarding (1999)
- Championship Surfer (2000)
- Barbie Beach Vacation (2001)
- Disney's Extremely Goofy Skateboarding (2001)
- Barbie: Sparkling Ice Show (2002)
- Star Wars: The Clone Wars – Republic Heroes (2009)
- Game Room (2010)
- Blade Kitten (2010)
- Kat Burglar (cancelled)
- Ty the Tasmanian Tiger 4 (2015)
- Ty the Tasmanian Tiger (2016)
- Ty the Tasmanian Tiger 2: Bush Rescue (2017)
- Ty the Tasmanian Tiger 3: Night of the Quinkan (2018)
- The Bard's Tale Trilogy (2018)
- Wasteland Remastered (2020)

=== Consoles ===
- Championship Surfer (PlayStation, Dreamcast) (2000)
- Sunny Garcia Surfing (PlayStation 2) (2001)
- Ty the Tasmanian Tiger (PlayStation 2, Xbox, GameCube) (2002)
- The Adventures of Jimmy Neutron Boy Genius: Jet Fusion (PlayStation 2, GameCube) (2003)
- Ty the Tasmanian Tiger 2: Bush Rescue (PlayStation 2, Xbox, GameCube) (2004)
- King Arthur (PlayStation 2, Xbox, GameCube) (2004)
- Ty the Tasmanian Tiger 3: Night of the Quinkan (PlayStation 2, Xbox, GameCube) (2005)
- The Legend of Spyro: A New Beginning (PlayStation 2, Xbox, GameCube, Game Boy Advance) (2006)
- The Legend of Spyro: The Eternal Night (PlayStation 2, Wii) (2007)
- Viva Piñata: Party Animals (Xbox 360) (2007)
- Hellboy: The Science of Evil (PlayStation 3, Xbox 360, PlayStation Portable) (2008)
- Star Wars: The Force Unleashed (PlayStation 2, Wii, PlayStation Portable) (2008)
- Star Wars: The Clone Wars - Lightsaber Duels (Wii) (2008)
- Scene It? Box Office Smash (Xbox 360) (2008)
- Star Wars: The Clone Wars – Republic Heroes (PlayStation 3, Xbox 360, Wii, PlayStation 2, PlayStation Portable) (2009)
- Transformers: Revenge of the Fallen (PlayStation 2, Wii) (2009)
- Game Room (Xbox 360) (2010)
- Blade Kitten (PlayStation 3, Xbox 360) (2010)
- Legend of the Guardians: The Owls of Ga'Hoole (Xbox 360, PlayStation 3, Wii) (2010)
- Full House Poker (Xbox 360) (2011)
- The Bard's Tale Trilogy (Xbox One) (2019)
- Wasteland Remastered (Xbox One) (2020)
- Ty the Tasmanian Tiger HD (Xbox One, Xbox Series X/S, Nintendo Switch, PlayStation 4) (2020)
- Ty the Tasmanian Tiger 2: Bush Rescue HD (Xbox One, Xbox Series X/S, Nintendo Switch, PlayStation 4) (2021)
- Star Wars: The Force Unleashed (Nintendo Switch) (2022)
- Hogwarts Legacy (PlayStation 4, PlayStation 5, Nintendo Switch, Xbox One, Xbox Series X/S) (Support Studio) (2023)
- Ty the Tasmanian Tiger 4: Bush Rescue Returns (Nintendo Switch) (2023)
- Hogwarts Legacy (Nintendo Switch 2) (port) (2025)

=== Mobile and web ===
- Game Room (Windows Phone 7) (2010)
- Full House Poker (Windows Phone 7) (2011)
- Toy Soldiers: Boot Camp (Windows Phone 7) (2012)
- Playmaker (iOS) (2011)
- Whole Wide World (iOS) (2012)
- Bush Rescue HQ (Facebook) (2010)
- Ty The Tasmanian Tiger: Boomerang Blast (iOS) (2012)
- Fruit Ninja – Math Master (iOS/Android) (2015)
- Disney Imagicademy – Frozen Early Science Cooking and Animal Care (iOS/Android) (2015) (in collaboration with Disney)
- Hidden Pictures (iOS/Android) (2015)
- Monster Dash (iOS/Android) (2020)
