= Ty the Tasmanian Tiger 3: Night of the Quinkan =

2005 video game

- North American PlayStation 2 cover art
- Developers: Krome Studios; Halfbrick Studios (GBA Version)
- Publishers: Activision; Krome Studios (PC)
- Director: Steve Stamatiadis
- Producer: Lindsay Parmenter
- Designer: Steve Stamatiadis
- Programmer: Matthew Peers
- Artists: Steve Stamatiadis; Matt Ditton
- Composer: George Stamatiadis
- Platforms: GameCube; PlayStation 2; Xbox; Game Boy Advance; Windows
- Release: GameCube, PlayStation 2, Xbox: NA: 12 October 2005; AU: 1 February 2006; Game Boy Advance: NA: 1 November 2005; Windows: WW: 17 December 2018
- Genre: Platform
- Modes: Single-player, multiplayer

Ty the Tasmanian Tiger 3: Night of the Quinkan (stylized as TY the Tasmanian Tiger 3: Night of the Quinkan) is a 2005 3D platforming game developed by Krome Studios and published by Activision for the GameCube, PlayStation 2 and Xbox, along with a 2D side-scrolling version released for the Game Boy Advance by Fruit Ninja developer Halfbrick. It is the sequel to Ty the Tasmanian Tiger 2: Bush Rescue and the third installment to the Ty the Tasmanian Tiger series. The game was later remastered in HD for Microsoft Windows and released on Steam in 2018. It is the only game in the series to be published by Activision rather than Electronic Arts and the only game to be rated E10+ by the ESRB.

== Gameplay ==
The overall gameplay is similar to previous games, but introduces Bunyip Stones, which can be equipped to boomerang chassis to change their functionality or elemental properties and combined to create unique boomerang combinations, such as explosive Lasorangs or Multirangs that track enemies. New boomerang chassis and Bunyip Stones can be purchased with Opals, the game's currency, from stores in Southern Rivers, and Bunyip Stones can also be earned as rewards for completing sidequests. As each boomerang chassis has a limited number of Bunyip Stone slots, the player must strategize which Stones to use and which boomerang chassis to equip them to. Certain Bunyip Stones also cancel each other out, such as Fire and Ice Stones, which cannot be used together, and warp Stones, which are incompatible with most Stones. Incompatible Stones will glow red when equipped to a chassis, and will cancel each other out unless one is removed. Each stone's effect can also be stacked upon itself to increase its effectiveness; for instance, fire Bunyip Stones equipped to the same chassis have a greater effect than a single one does.

Another major addition is that of a melee combat system. Unlike previous games, many enemies are immune to damage from thrown boomerangs. As such, without the use of a powerful boomerang or a Bunyip Mech, most enemies can only be defeated through melee combat. Melee combat consists of a 5-hit combo, a move that throws enemies up into the air, an aerial juggle combo, and the bite move from previous games. Most enemies also have a health bar that decreases as they take damage, with most taking multiple hits to defeat.

The game also features several vehicles for exploration and combat. The Chopper, Go-Cart and Shadow Bunyip from previous games return. The game also introduces the Crabmersible, which replaces the Fourbie jeep from Bush Rescue and has the ability to submerge underwater, the Extreme Bunyip, which replaces the auxiliary Bunyips and Battle Bunyip from Bush Rescue, and the Gunyip, a fighter plane used in certain missions.

Multiplayer is present and consists of "Cart Racing" and "Gunyip Dogfighting", both of which are playable with up to four players.

A version of the game was also released for the Game Boy Advance. Like its GBA predecessor, it is a 2D platformer rather than a 3D platformer. When using the Gunyip, the game switches to a scrolling shooter, and when using the Chopper, switches to a top-down action game. Unlike the console versions, the Go-Cart and related sidequests and characters are absent, and there are no multiplayer modes.

== Plot ==
The events of the console and handheld versions differ greatly.

=== Console ===
Following the events of the previous game, the Bunyip Elder Nandu Gili makes contact with Ty the Tasmanian Tiger and his girlfriend Shazza the Dingo, telling them that an ancient evil entered the magical dimension of The Dreaming as Ty's nemesis, the cassowary Boss Cass, was being freed from Currawong Jail. The Elder transports them to The Dreaming, where he explains that evil spirits known as the Quinkan have invaded the realm. Ty agrees to fight the Quinkan, but the Elder claims that it would be suicidal, as they are immune to conventional weapons such as Ty's Boomerangs. Instead, he suggests that Ty and Shazza obtain the Bunyip Gauntlet, which would allow Ty to fight the Quinkan.

After acquiring the Gauntlet, Shazza stays behind with the Bunyip Guardian Thigana while Ty heads deeper into The Dreaming and opens up a vortex that sucks the Quinkan out of The Dreaming. Afterwards, the Bunyip Elder offers to train Ty in wielding the Bunyip Gauntlet, which he accepts. After training with Thigana and the Bunyip Gauntlet's guardian Mallyaan, the Bunyip Elder teleports Ty and Shazza back to Southern Rivers, but they are separated after a Quinkan attacks. Ty arrives in Southern Rivers six months after Shazza and reunites with Shazza and Sly, who explain that they are currently in the town of New Burramudgee, as the old town was destroyed when the Quinkan invaded Southern Rivers, and that Bush Rescue was disbanded as a result of the invasion, as its members were unable to fight the Quinkan without his help. They decide to reunite the members of Bush Rescue to fight back against the Quinkan invasion.

=== Handheld ===
Following the events of the previous game, the Bunyip Elder contacts Ty and Shazza and teleports them to The Dreaming, where he explains that evil spirits known as the Quinkan have invaded The Dreaming and are wreaking havoc. While Shazza stays behind with the Bunyip Elder, Ty is tasked with driving the Quinkan out of The Dreaming and is teleported to the Quinkan Castle located deep within the realm. Upon arriving, Ty contacts Julius, who provides him with the newly developed Vortex Bomb, which is capable of sucking the Quinkan out of The Dreaming. After making his way through the castle, Ty plants the bomb at the castle's weak point and activates it. As he escapes, the Bunyip Elder teleports him out of The Dreaming to avoid the Bomb's explosion.

Ty arrives in Southern Rivers in a desolate area overrun with Quinkan and reunites with Shazza and Sly, who explain that they are currently in the town of New Burramudgee, as the old town was destroyed when the Quinkan invaded Southern Rivers, and that Bush Rescue was disbanded as a result of the invasion, as its members were unable to fight the Quinkan without his help. They decide to reunite the members of Bush Rescue to fight back against the Quinkan invasion. All but a few of the former Bush Rescue members rejoin the team, along with Shazza's sister Naomi as the team's new Bunyip Suit mechanic. Burramudgee resident Red the Dog also joins the team, believing that an understanding could potentially be reached with the Quinkan through negotiation rather than violence.

With Ty's help, the reformed Bush Rescue liberates a large portion of Southern Rivers and he rescues Dennis, who took over the war effort after Bush Rescue was disbanded, from the Quinkan and convinces Maurie, who became a recluse after establishing a watering hole in the mountains, to rejoin Bush Rescue. After liberating the area around New Burramudgee, Dennis tasks Ty with defeating the Hexaquin, a powerful Quinkan guardian who is blocking Bush Rescue's access to the other parts of Southern Rivers, to ensure Bush Rescue's safe passage through the area.

Following the battle, Ty is informed that Red has deserted Bush Rescue and kidnapped Shazza for the Quinkan. Ty and Bush Rescue reluctantly team up with Boss Cass and Fluffy, with Cass promising to locate Shazza in exchange for Ty completing various tasks for him. As Ty completes Cass' tasks, Fluffy challenges him to a race up Whataview Mountain, with Cass keeping his word if he wins and Ty becoming her personal slave for a day if he loses. With the new Extreme Bunyip provided by Naomi, Ty wins against Fluffy. Fluffy expresses that they are meant for each other and assures Ty that she will make sure that Cass keeps his word and locates Shazza for him. After completing Cass' tasks, he informs Ty that a Quinkan guardian known as the Dragonquin is hiding in the skyline of Cassopolis and is holding Shazza hostage. Using the Gunyip fighter plane, Ty locates and defeats the Dragonquin, with parts of its body turning to stone and falling into the forest below. Once freed, Shazza tells Ty that while in captivity, she overheard the Quinkan making preparations for the arrival of their leader, the Quinking, in Southern Rivers.

Upon further research, Julius speculates that the parts of the Dragonquin's body that fell to the ground, which he calls Shadow Stones, could be used to power a weapon capable of defeating the Quinking. At Dennis' suggestion, Ty seeks advice from the "Quinking Expert" in the Valley of the Lost, who is revealed to be Gooboo Steve. He explains that the ultimate weapon capable of defeating the Quinking, the Shadowring, is somewhere in the forest and cannot function properly without the Shadow Stones. With this information, Ty, Julius and Ranger Ken find the Shadowring and the Shadow Stones.

With the Shadowring in Ty's possession, Boss Cass informs him that the guardian of the Quinking's territory, the Spiderquin, is the last obstacle standing between Bush Rescue and the Quinking. Ty defeats the Spiderquin with the Shadowring and, along with Sly, Shazza and Fluffy, heads to the Quinkan Citadel at the heart of the Quinking's territory. After fighting through the Citadel, the group confronts the Quinking, who reveals that Boss Cass let the Quinkan into Southern Rivers and that they had been working together. Seeking an opportunity to get revenge on Ty and rule over Southern Rivers, Cass appears and double-crosses Ty and the Quinking. He attacks Ty, but Fluffy sacrifices herself to protect him. Enraged by Fluffy's death, Ty takes on the Quinking in a final battle. To gain the upper hand, he transforms into a more powerful form, but Ty defeats him and restores peace to Southern Rivers. Some time after the Quinkan are defeated, life has returned to normal for Ty, his friends and the residents of New Burramudgee. Boss Cass is sent back to prison for his crimes and a statue of Fluffy is erected in the town's square in honor of her sacrifice.

== Reception ==
Reception

Aggregate score
Aggregator	Score
Metacritic	73/100 (GBA); 68/100 (PS2); 68/100 (GC); 66/100 (Xbox)

Review scores
Publication	Score
GameSpot	6/10 (PS2); 6/10 (GC); 5.8/10 (Xbox); 6.9/10 (GBA)
IGN	6.9/10

Ty the Tasmanian Tiger 3: Night of the Quinkan received "mixed or average reviews", according to review aggregator Metacritic. The game was criticized for feeling too similar to previous games in a series that was already feeling to similar to other, more popular games. Matt Casamassina of IGN wrote, "Ty the Tasmanian Tiger 3: Night of the Quinkan is a predictable sequel to the first two iterations of the franchise. That doesn't make it bad. In fact, it's still enjoyable, especially as straightforward platformer for kids. But the Ty series has never been original and this latest version feels like a copy of a copy. Gamers who played and didn't like the other two versions will find nothing new here and Ty fans may find themselves wondering why very little has changed."

== Sequel ==
=== Cancelled Gunyip! sequel ===
Following the release of Ty the Tasmanian Tiger 3, development began on a fourth entry originally titled Ty the Tasmanian Tiger 4: Gunyip!. According to co-creator Steve Stamatiadis, it was supposed to be focused on aerial combat expanding upon the feature introduced in the previous game. It was also set to feature a variety of Bunyip-inspired aircraft, factions and new and returning characters. Development was cancelled around 2007 as Krome reallocated resources to develop ports of Star Wars: The Force Unleashed. A test reel of the game was released on Stamatiadis's Tumblr page and featured as bonus content in the PC remaster of Ty the Tasmanian Tiger 3.

=== Ty the Tasmanian Tiger 4 ===
On 27 July 2012, Krome announced plans for a new Ty The Tasmanian Tiger game to be developed for the iOS to coincide with the series's 10th anniversary, this game was revealed to be Ty the Tasmanian Tiger: Boomerang Blast, released late 2012. On 11 March 2013, Krome Studios announced a 2D Ty title to be released on 24 July 2013 on Xbox Games for Windows 8 PC and/or Tablet. Ty the Tasmanian Tiger 4 was originally released on Xbox Games for Windows 8 PC and tablets titled Ty the Tasmanian Tiger in 2013 then ported to Steam for Microsoft Windows as Ty the Tasmanian Tiger 4 in 2015. It was released on 18 September 2015.
