= Journal of Policing, Intelligence and Counter Terrorism =

- Discipline: Political science
- Language: English
- Edited by: Julian Droogan

Publication details
- History: 2006-present
- Publisher: Routledge
- Frequency: Quarterly

Standard abbreviations
- ISO 4: J. Polic. Intell. Count. Terror.

Indexing
- ISSN: 1833-5330 (print); 2159-5364 (web)

Links
- Journal homepage; Online access; Online archive

The Journal of Policing, Intelligence and Counter Terrorism (JPICT) is an international peer-reviewed academic journal covering policing, intelligence and counterterrorism published by Taylor and Francis, Routledge.

The Journal of Policing, Intelligence and Counter Terrorism is a forum for international experts in policing studies, intelligence studies and terrorism and counter terrorism studies. JPICT provides regional, national and international perspectives on current security issues. It also provides a forum for researchers and practitioners to discuss areas of applied knowledge.

The Journal of Policing, Intelligence and Counter Terrorism aims to present cutting-edge research on contemporary security issues and debates, and publish articles that explore the interplay between policing, intelligence and counter terrorism. The Journal also acts as an international forum for debate on theoretical and applied issues, and examines the connection between the theoretical study of contemporary security issues and their practical application.

The Journal of Policing, Intelligence and Counter Terrorism publishes articles that provide practical policy proscriptions as well as theoretical insights. It is also unique in its inclusion of practitioner perspectives on policing, intelligence and counter terrorism issues.

The Journal of Policing, Intelligence and Counter Terrorism publishes one special issue every year. Notable special issues include:

- Special Issue - Volume 19, Issue 4: Predictive Intelligence for Tomorrow's Threats - Is Predictive Intelligence Possible?
- Special Issue - Volume 14, Issue 3: After Christchurch - Global Perspectives on Far-Right Terrorism
- Special Issue - Volume 16, Issue 1: Navigating the Divide - Cooperation Between Academics and National Security Practitioners
