= Star Wars: The Clone Wars – Republic Heroes =

2009 video game

- Developers: Krome Studios; LucasArts Singapore (DS)
- Publisher: LucasArts
- Producers: John Whiston; Paul Armatta
- Designer: Chris Palu
- Programmer: James Podesta
- Artist: Kevin McGrath
- Composer: Kevin Kiner
- Series: Star Wars: The Clone Wars
- Platforms: Windows, Xbox 360, PlayStation 3, Wii, PlayStation Portable, PlayStation 2, Nintendo DS
- Release: NA: October 6, 2009; AU: October 7, 2009; EU: October 9, 2009
- Genre: Action-adventure
- Modes: Single-player, multiplayer

Star Wars: The Clone Wars – Republic Heroes is a 2009 action-adventure video game developed by Krome Studios and published by LucasArts. It was released for Microsoft Windows, Xbox 360, PlayStation 3, Wii, PSP and PlayStation 2 on October 6, 2009. A Nintendo DS port was also developed by LucasArts Singapore. The game is a tie-in to the Star Wars: The Clone Wars animated TV series, which follows the adventures of Anakin Skywalker, Obi-Wan Kenobi, Ahsoka Tano, and other Jedi and clone troopers during the Clone Wars. In the game's story, the Confederacy of Independent Systems recruits Skakoan scientist Kul Teska to develop a new superweapon, prompting an investigation by the Galactic Republic, who attempts to stop its construction.

Republic Heroes received mostly negative reviews upon release due to its dull gameplay, story and camera issues.

== Gameplay ==
Republic Heroes features cooperative gameplay. Depending on the level, players control either two Jedi or two clone troopers.

Star Wars: The Clone Wars – Republic Heroes is a level-based action-adventure game, played from a third-person perspective. While it can be played solo, the game also features a two-player cooperative multiplayer mode. When played solo, players can switch between characters at will while the other character are controlled by artificial intelligence. Gameplay changes from level to level, although players will usually control either Jedi or clone troopers. When playing as Jedi, the gameplay is a combination of beat 'em ups and parkour; players can use their lightsabers and Force abilities to fight enemies, as well as solve puzzles. When playing as clones, the gameplay is similar to that of third-person shooters, with players wielding blasters and other weapons from the Star Wars universe, such as Thermal Detenators. A fixed camera angle is used throughout the entire game, which was one of the most criticized aspects of the gameplay.

== Plot ==
Set in between the events of the series' first and second seasons, the game follows the adventures of multiple characters during the Clone Wars, which eventually come together by the end of the game. The story begins with the Battle of Ryloth, where Anakin Skywalker and Ahsoka Tano are leading an assault on a Separatist stronghold, having to clear the path of battle droids to allow their clone troopers to advance. Meanwhile, the Separatists attack the Republic's Juma 9 space station, where Jedi Masters Obi-Wan Kenobi and Plo Koon, Commander Cody and clone trooper Switch try to fend them off. On their way to the comms room, Obi-Wan and Plo find a heavily-armored Skakoan scientist and follow him. Cornered, he reveals his name to be Kul Teska and battles the two Jedi before making his escape, leaving Obi-Wan and Plo trapped. Having lost contact with Anakin and Ahsoka, they instead call Mace Windu and Kit Fisto, who, along with Commander Ponds, rescue them.

On Alzoc III, Jedi Masters Aayla Secura and Luminara Unduli lead an investigation on supposed Separatist sightings, reported to them by Jabba the Hutt. They come across floating debris leading to a crashed Separatist ship, which they discover was destroyed by a superweapon the Separatists are developing. After informing the Republic, they are attacked by Asajj Ventress, who was dispatched by Count Dooku to kill any witnesses. Aayla and Luminara duel Ventress and manage to trap her inside an ice cave.

Back on Ryloth, Captain Rex and Sergeant Boomer are captured by the bounty hunter Cad Bane, a rival of Teska's, who orders them to load a key component of the Gravitic Polarization Beam (the Separatist superweapon which caused the floating debris on Alzoc III) aboard his ship. When they are attacked by the Separatists' battle droids, Bane reluctantly releases the two clones to help fend them off. Shortly after, Anakin and Ahsoka arrive and help eliminate the remaining droids, before agreeing to help Bane load the superweapon into his ship, not wanting it to fall back into the Separatists' hands. While Rex and Boomer stay behind to fight droid reinforcements, Anakin, Ahsoka, and Bane deliver the Gravitic Polarization Beam to the latter's ship, where they are attacked by Kul Teska, who came to claim back the superweapon after Bane stole it from him on Alzoc III. As Bane makes his escape, Anakin and Ahsoka attempt to fight Teska, but he manages to flee with the superweapon.

Anakin and Ahsoka contact Obi-Wan, Plo Koon, Mace Windu, Kit Fisto to discuss the situation; they are soon joined by Yoda, Aayla Secura, and Luminara Unduli. After learning that Teska and Dooku plan to use the Gravitic Polarization Beam to destroy the sun of the Naboo Star System, and that the Separatists captured Senator Padmé Amidala after she stumbled upon their secret base on Behpour, the group plans a full-scale invasion of the planet to destroy the superweapon and rescue Padmé. Commander Cody and Captain Rex create a distraction that gives Anakin and Obi-Wan enough time to infiltrate the Separatists' base and destroy its deflector shield generator, allowing the main body of clone troopers, commanded by Windu and Ahsoka, to storm the base.

Inside the base, Anakin and Ahsoka make their way to Teska's lab to confront him, while Rex, Cody and Ponds clear the path of battle droids for the Twilight ship to land at the rendezvous point. While waiting for the others to arrive, however, Count Dooku attacks and traps them inside the ship using the Force, which he then throws off the platform it was standing. Moments later, Obi-Wan and Windu arrive to duel Dooku, but during their fight the platform collapses; Dooku is picked up by Ventress in her ship and the pair escape, while the Jedi are rescued by R2-D2 flying the Twilight. Meanwhile, Anakin and Ahsoka defeat Teska (with some unexpected help from Cad Bane), before rescuing Padmé, who has sabotaged the Gravitic Polarization Beam. The trio manage to escape from the base moments before the superweapon explodes, killing Teska and destroying the base. They rendezvous with the others outside, whereupon the Republic celebrates its victory. In a post-credits scene, it is revealed that Bane sabotaged Dooku and Ventress' escape ship.

== Reception ==
Reception

Aggregate score
Aggregator	Score
Metacritic	(PC) 46/100 (PS3) 43/100 (X360) 43/100

Review scores
Publication	Score
Eurogamer	3/10
Game Informer	5.5/10
GameRevolution	3/10
GameSpot	(PC/PS3/X360) 3.5/10 (WII) 4.5/10 (DS) 5.5/10
GamesRadar+	2/5
IGN	4.8/10; 5.5/10 (DS)
The Guardian	2/5
VideoGamer.com	4/10

Star Wars: The Clone Wars – Republic Heroes scored generally negative reviews. The game holds a score of 46% on Metacritic. The fixed camera view, repetitive gameplay, and dull story were among the most criticized aspects of the game.

In a representative critique, Chris Roper of IGN gave the game a 4.8/10, starting his review by saying, "The first thing you'll notice is that pretty much regardless of which system you play it on, it looks rather terrible." Roper then goes on to say "About five seconds after you notice how bad it looks, you'll realize that the game's platforming elements are unresponsive and oftentimes frustrating." He closed his review stating that "Unless you or your kids want to play as Jedi or clone troopers just for the sake of doing so, then there's really nothing here that'll keep anyone, young or old, interested for very long." Roper recommends playing a Lego Star Wars game instead. GameSpot awarded it a more negative score of 3.5 out of ten, saying "Even the most diehard Star Wars fan will have a hard time stomaching this disappointing effort" and calling it "one spectacularly frustrating platformer."
