= List of Star Wars film actors =

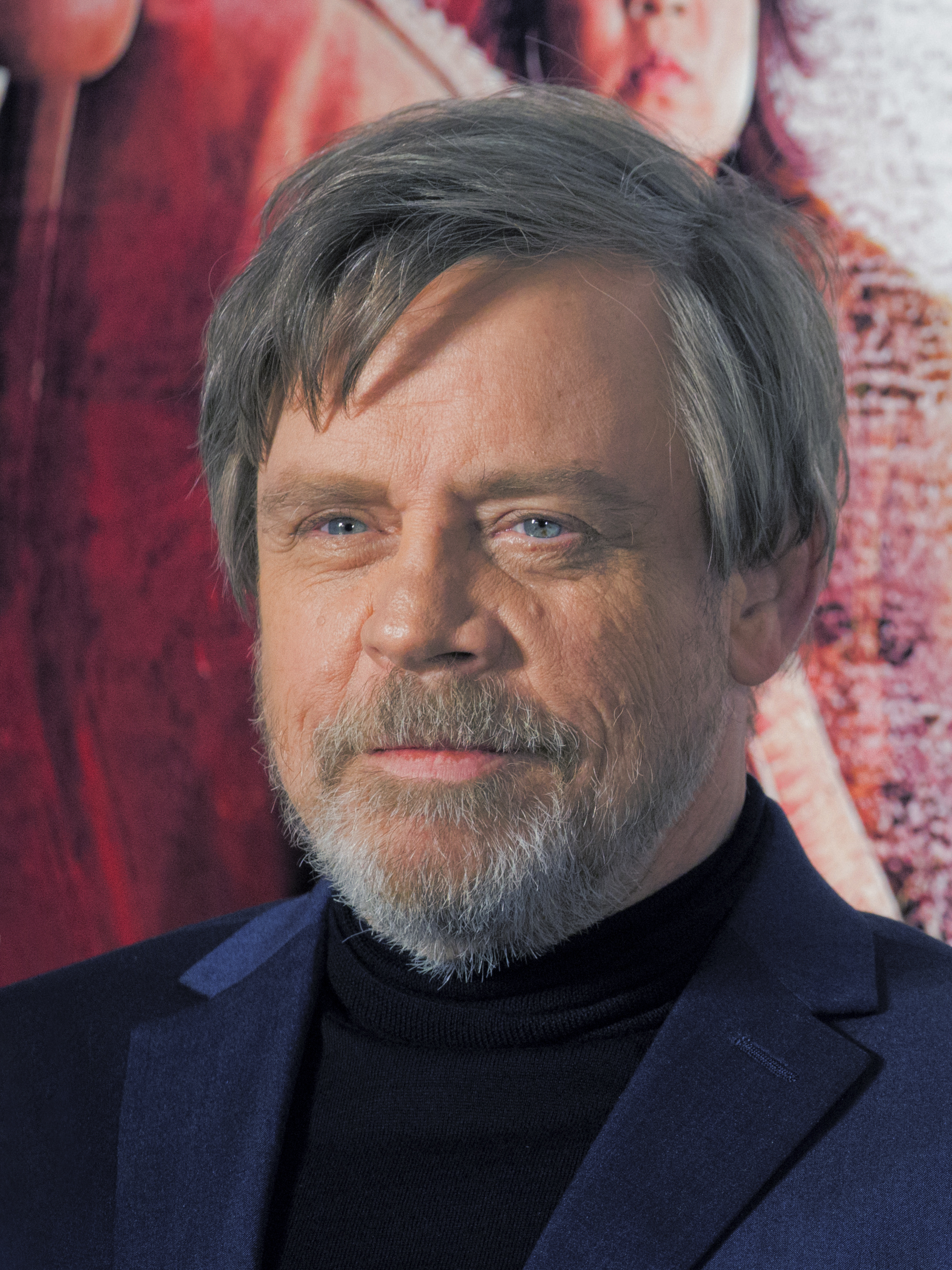
Mark Hamill

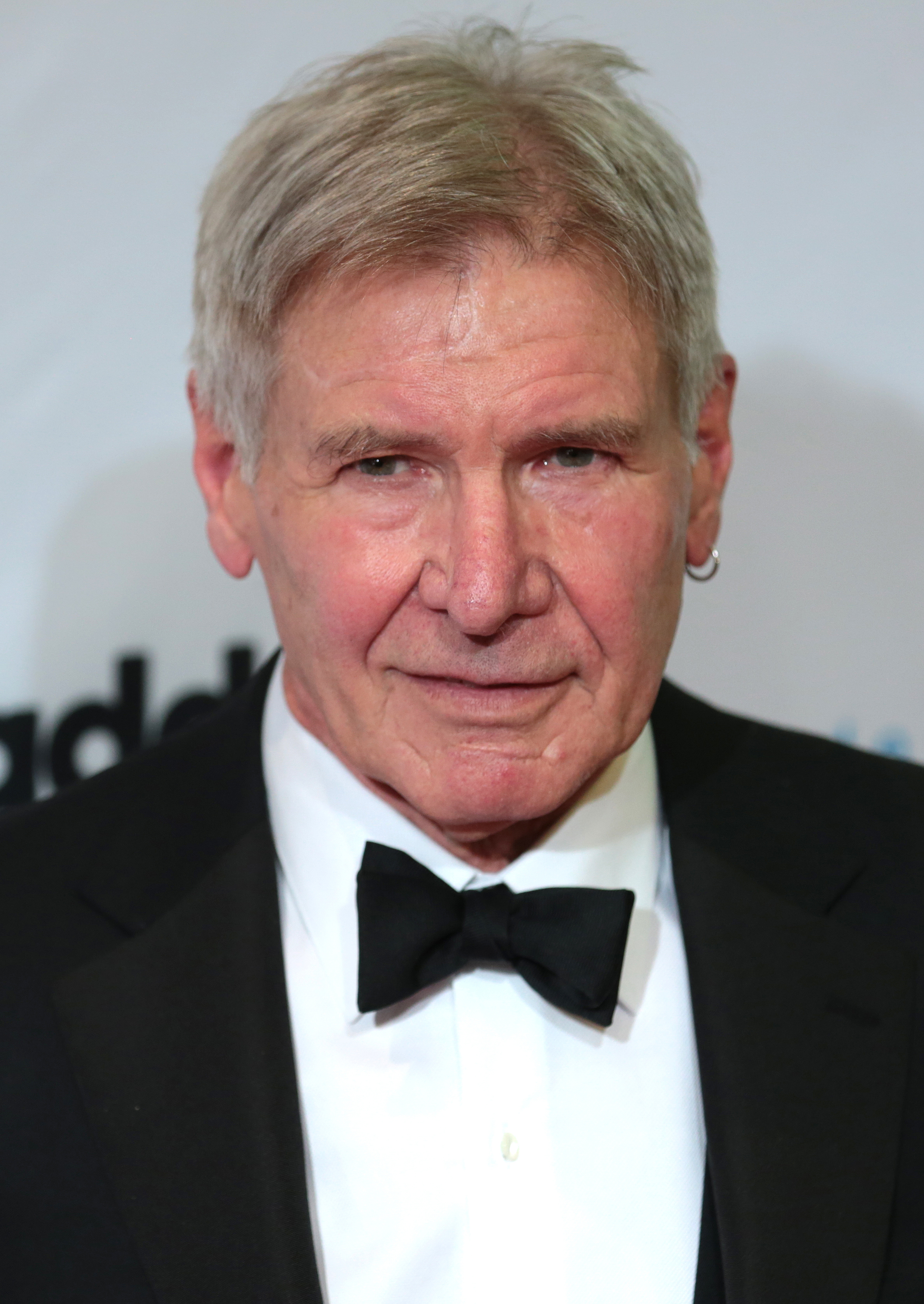
Harrison Ford

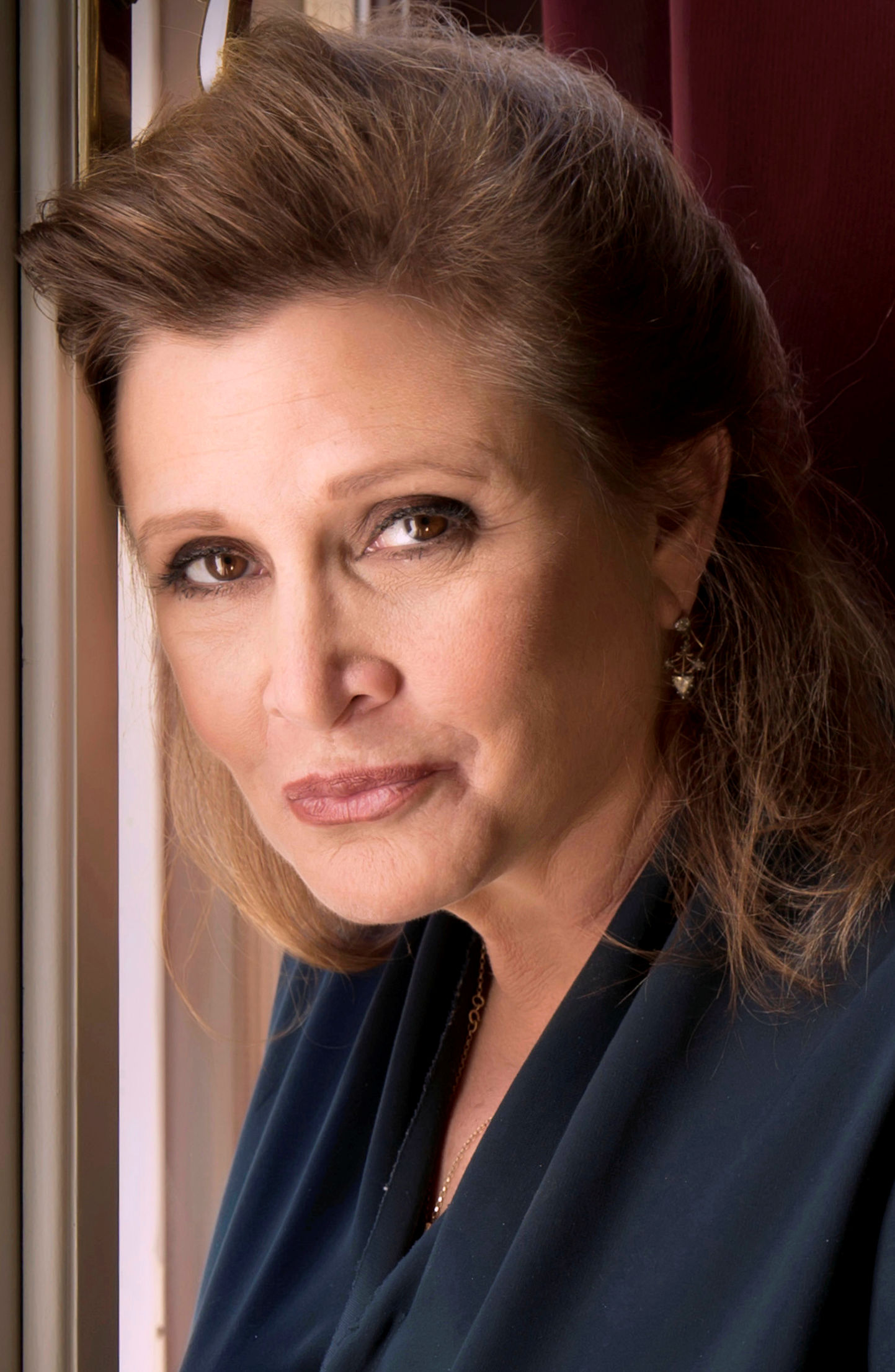
Carrie Fisher

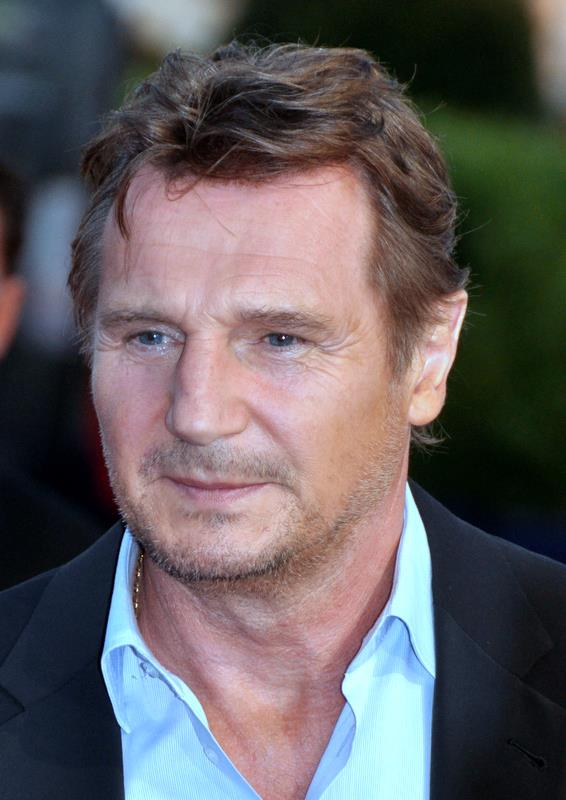
Liam Neeson

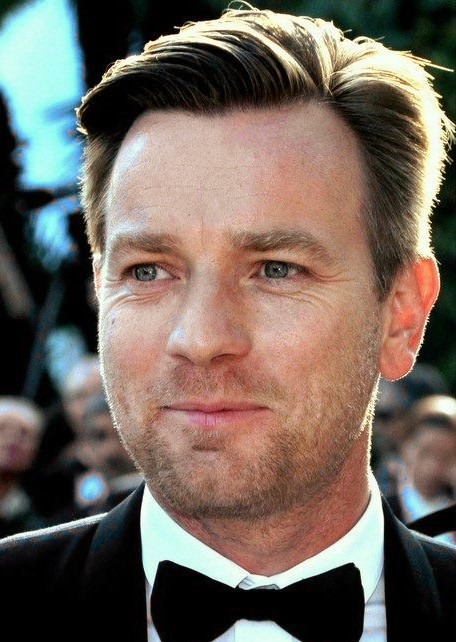
Ewan McGregor

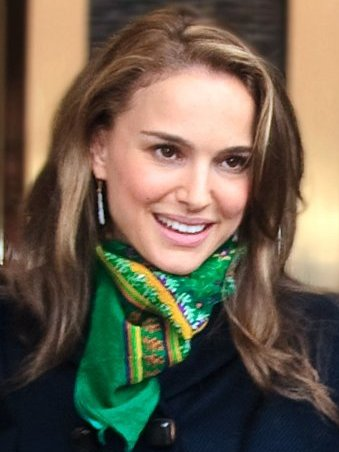
Natalie Portman

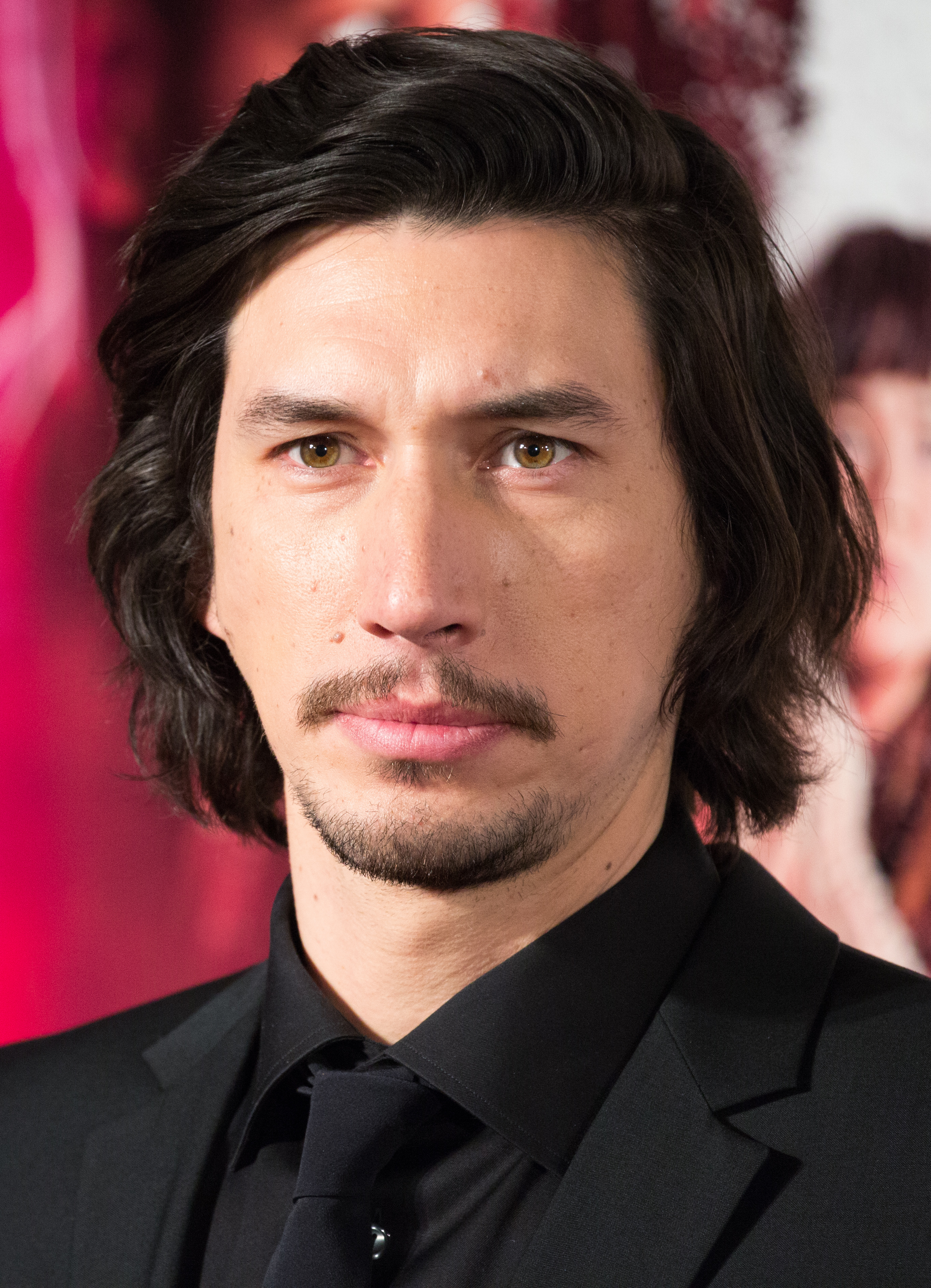
Adam Driver

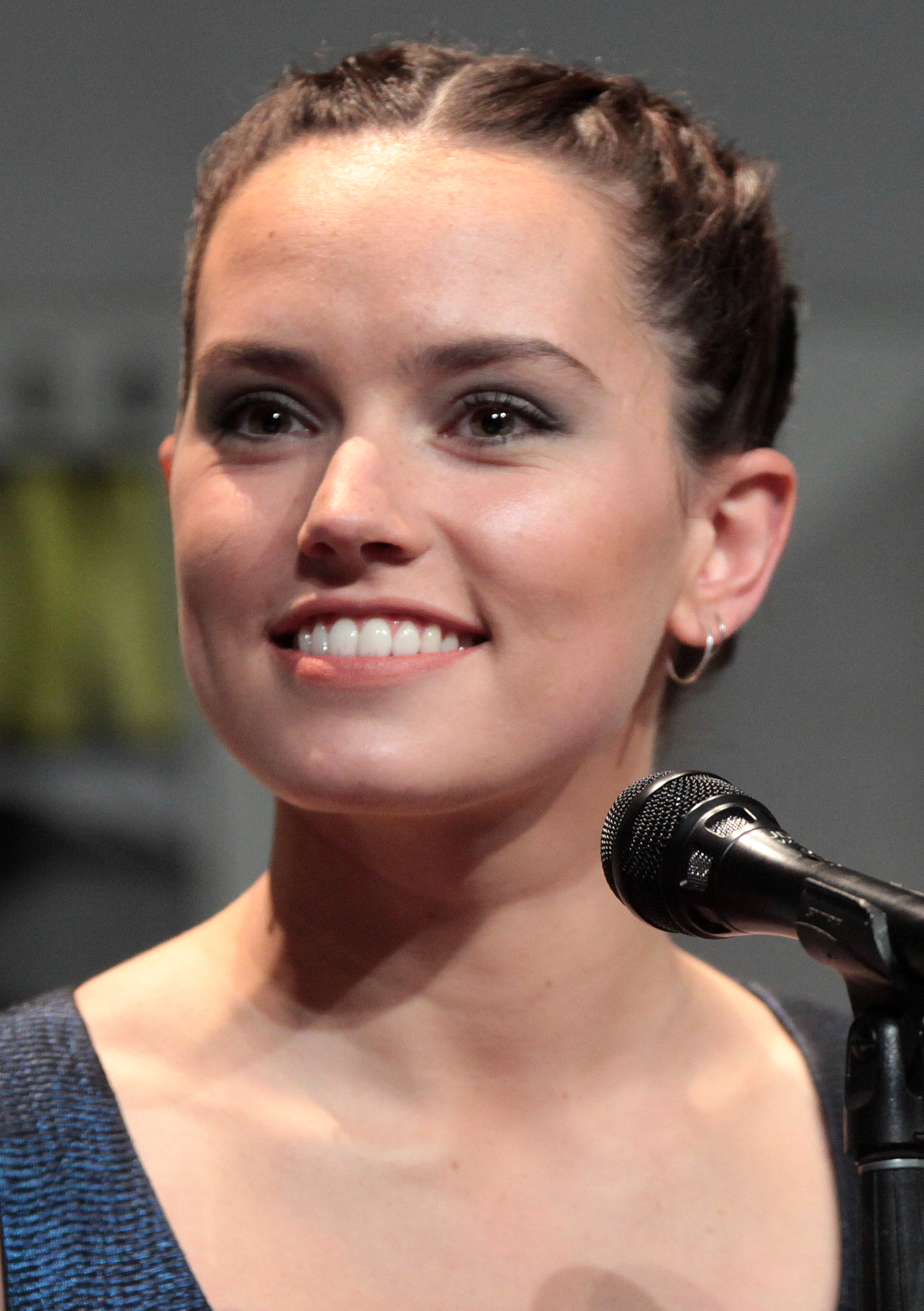
Daisy Ridley

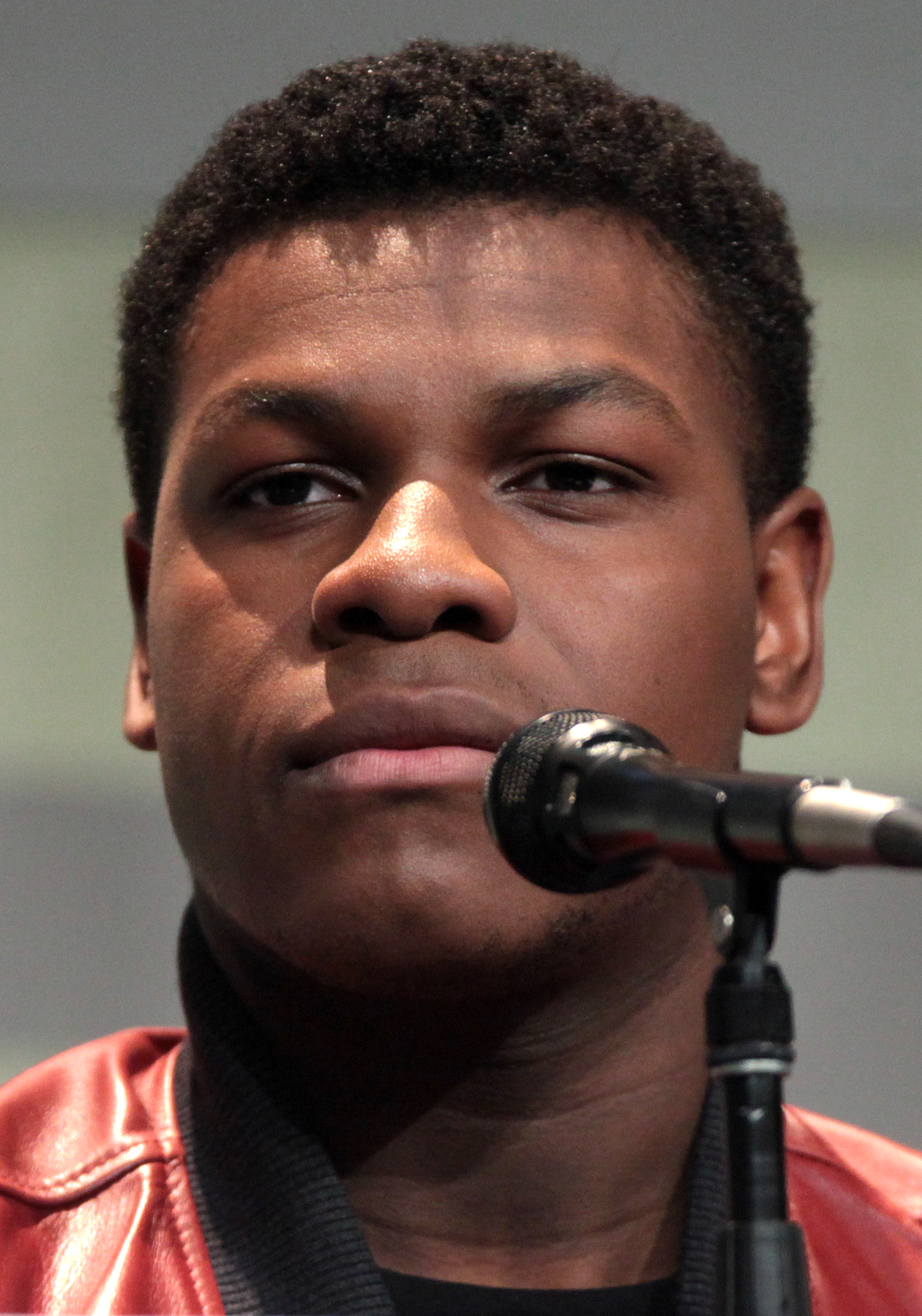
John Boyega

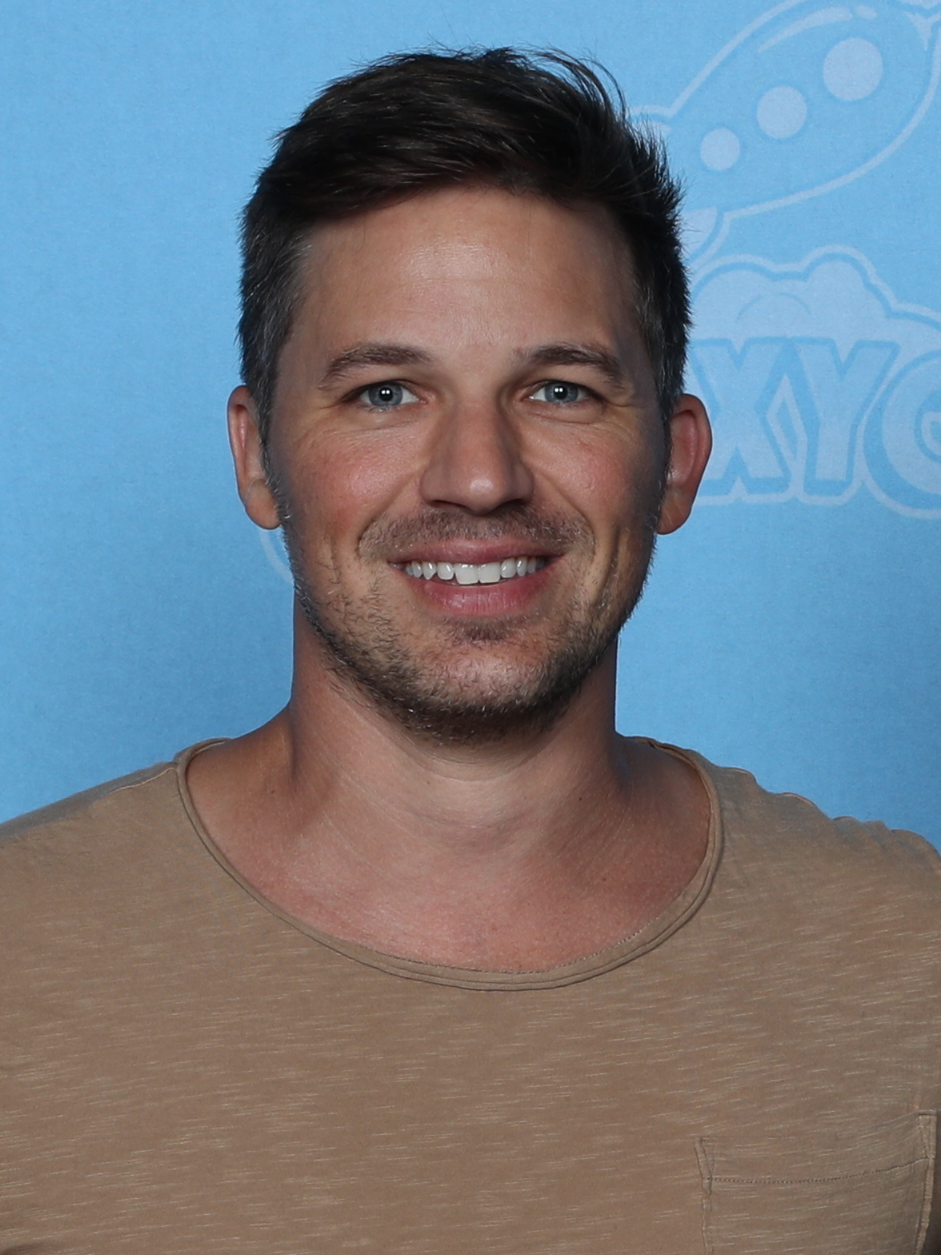
Matt Lanter

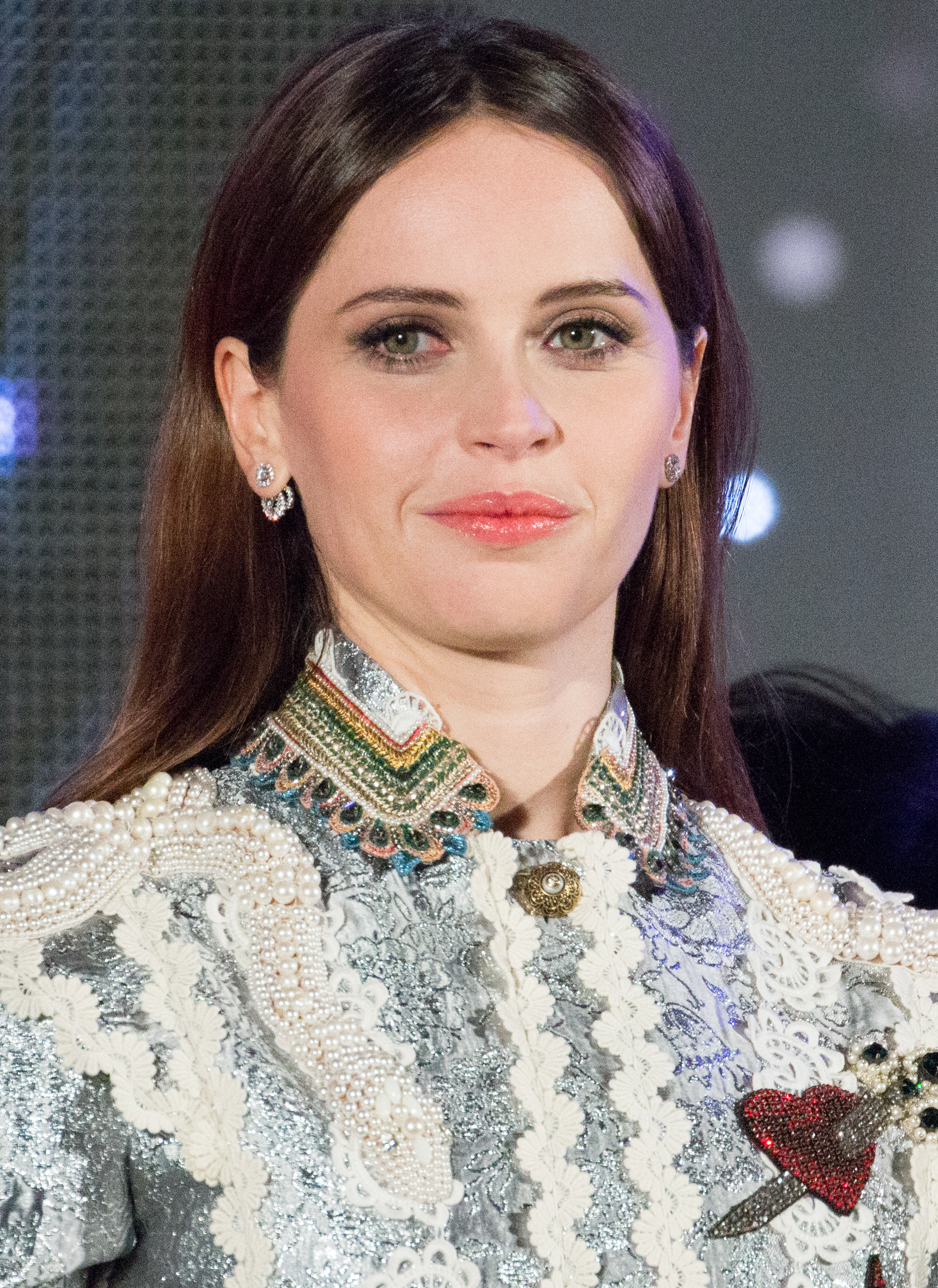
Felicity Jones

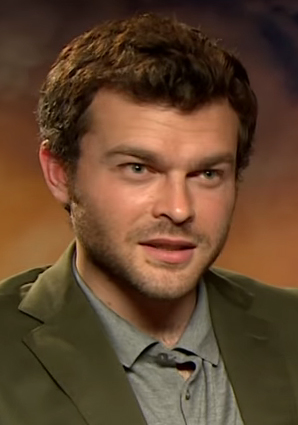
Alden Ehrenreich

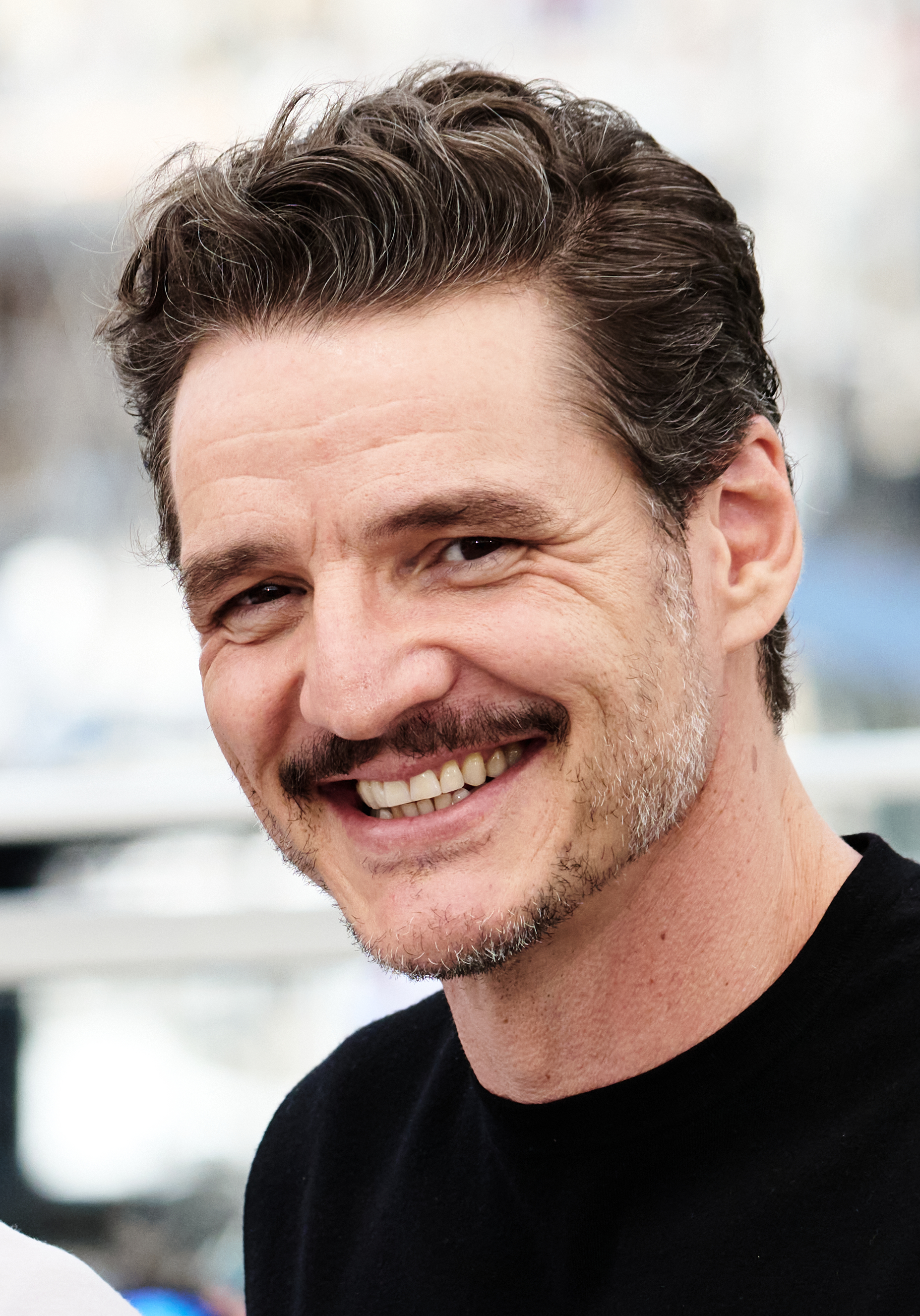
Pedro Pascal

Hamill, Ford, Fisher, Neeson, McGregor, Portman, Driver, Ridley, Boyega, Lanter, Jones, Ehrenreich, and Pascal headline films in the franchise.

Star Wars is a media franchise and shared fictional universe that is the setting of science fiction films produced by Lucasfilm, based on characters created by George Lucas. The Skywalker Saga of the franchise includes nine films, featuring three trilogies; the original trilogy, the prequel trilogy, and the sequel trilogy. The original trilogy began with A New Hope in 1977, followed by The Empire Strikes Back (1980) and Return of the Jedi (1983), while the prequel trilogy consists of The Phantom Menace (1999), Attack of the Clones (2002), and Revenge of the Sith (2005). The sequel trilogy consists of The Force Awakens (2015), The Last Jedi (2017), and The Rise of Skywalker (2019), and chronologically follows Return of the Jedi in the saga. Additionally, an animated film was released in 2008, and two standalone anthology films were released in 2016 and 2018.

The films feature large, sometimes ensemble, casts of actors and actresses, with multiple lead actors. Mark Hamill, Harrison Ford, and Carrie Fisher star as Luke Skywalker, Han Solo, and Leia Organa, respectively, in the original trilogy films. Liam Neeson, Ewan McGregor, Natalie Portman, and Jake Lloyd respectively star as Qui-Gon Jinn, Obi-Wan Kenobi, Padmé Amidala and Anakin Skywalker in The Phantom Menace, with McGregor and Portman returning for its two sequels and Hayden Christensen playing the older Anakin in them. Ford, Hamill, Fisher, and other cast members from the original trilogy returned to reprise their roles and co-star alongside Adam Driver as Kylo Ren, Daisy Ridley as Rey and John Boyega as Finn in the sequel trilogy films. Matt Lanter portrays Anakin in the animated film The Clone Wars (2008), Felicity Jones portrays Jyn Erso in Rogue One (2016), Alden Ehrenreich portrays a young Han Solo in Solo: A Star Wars Story (2018), and Pedro Pascal portrays Din Djarin / The Mandalorian in The Mandalorian and Grogu (2026).

Anthony Daniels is the only actor to have appeared in all films in the franchise, appearing as C-3PO in all except Solo and The Mandalorian and Grogu, in which he appeared as Tak and the voice of an air traffic control droid respectively. Multiple other cast members recur across multiple films and series within the franchise. The list below is sorted by film and the character's surname, as some characters have been portrayed by multiple actors. All characters that have made appearances in other Star Wars media, such as the television series or television films, are noted.

== The Skywalker Saga ==
List indicators

This section includes characters who have appeared in the Skywalker Saga.

- An empty grey cell indicates the character was not in the film.
- ^{A} indicates an appearance through archival footage or audio.
- ^{C} indicates a cameo role.
- ^{E} indicates an appearance not included in the theatrical cut.
- ^{MC} indicates a motion-capture-only role.
- ^{V} indicates a voice-only role.
- ^{Y} indicates a younger version of the character.
- ^{O} indicates the character appears in other films outside the Skywalker Saga.
- ^{TS} indicates the character appears in a television series.
- ^{TF} indicates the character appears in a television film.

Character	Episode IV A New Hope	Episode V The Empire Strikes Back	Episode VI Return of the Jedi	Episode I The Phantom Menace	Episode II Attack of the Clones	Episode III Revenge of the Sith	Episode VII The Force Awakens	Episode VIII The Last Jedi	Episode IX The Rise of Skywalker
Character	1977	1980	1983	1999	2002	2005	2015	2017	2019
=== Introduced in A New Hope ===
Raymus Antilles^{O}	Peter Geddis					Rohan Nichol			
Wedge Antilles^{TS} ^{O}	Denis Lawson Colin Higgins David Ankrum^{V}	Denis Lawson	Denis Lawson						Denis Lawson
Moradmin Bast	Leslie Schofield								
C-3PO^{TS} ^{TF} ^{O}	Anthony Daniels	Anthony Daniels	Anthony Daniels	Anthony Daniels	Anthony Daniels	Anthony Daniels	Anthony Daniels	Anthony Daniels	Anthony Daniels
Chief Jawa	Jack Purvis								
Chewbacca^{TS} ^{TF} ^{O}	Peter Mayhew	Peter Mayhew	Peter Mayhew			Peter Mayhew	Peter Mayhew Joonas Suotamo	Joonas Suotamo	Joonas Suotamo
Biggs Darklighter	Garrick Hagon								
Jan Dodonna^{TS} ^{O}	Alex McCrindle								
Cornelius Evazan^{O}	Alfie Curtis								
Garindan Long-Snoot	Sadie Eden John Wayne^{V}								
Greedo^{TS}	Paul Blake Maria De Aragon Larry Ward^{V}			Simon Rose^{E} Oliver Wapole^{E}					
Arhul Hextrophon	Nick Joseph								
Obi-Wan Kenobi^{TS} ^{O}	Alec Guinness	Alec Guinness	Alec Guinness	Ewan McGregor	Ewan McGregor	Ewan McGregor	Alec Guinness^{A}^{V} Ewan McGregor^{V} ^{C}		Alec Guinness^{A}^{V}^{C} Ewan McGregor^{V}^{C}
Edmos Khurgee	Christopher Muncke								
Beru Lars	Shelagh Fraser				Bonnie Piesse	Bonnie Piesse			
Owen Lars	Phil Brown				Joel Edgerton	Joel Edgerton			
Conan Antonio Motti	Richard LeParmentier								
Leia Organa^{TS} ^{TF}	Carrie Fisher	Carrie Fisher	Carrie Fisher			Aidan Barton^{I}	Carrie Fisher	Carrie Fisher	Carrie Fisher Billie Lourd^{MC}
R2-D2^{TS} ^{TF} ^{O}	Kenny Baker	Kenny Baker	Kenny Baker	Kenny Baker	Kenny Baker	Kenny Baker	Jimmy Vee^{C}	Jimmy Vee	Hassan Taj Lee Towersey
Han Solo^{TS} ^{TF}	Harrison Ford	Harrison Ford	Harrison Ford				Harrison Ford		Harrison Ford^{C}
Luke Skywalker^{TS} ^{TF}	Mark Hamill	Mark Hamill	Mark Hamill			Aidan Barton^{I}	Mark Hamill	Mark Hamill	Mark Hamill Lukaz Leong^{MC}
General Taggi	Don Henderson								
Willhuff Tarkin^{TS} ^{O}	Peter Cushing					Wayne Pygram			
Darth Vader Anakin Skywalker^{TS} ^{O}	David Prowse James Earl Jones^{V}	David Prowse James Earl Jones^{V}	David Prowse James Earl Jones^{V} Sebastian Shaw Hayden Christensen^{E}	Jake Lloyd	Hayden Christensen	Hayden Christensen James Earl Jones^{V}^{C}			James Earl Jones^{V}^{C} Hayden Christensen^{V}^{C}
Vanden Willard	Eddie Byrne Michael Bell^{V}								
Jon "Dutch" Vander^{O}	Angus MacInnes								
Wullf Yularen^{TS}	Robert Clarke								
=== Introduced in The Empire Strikes Back ===
4-LOM		Chris Parsons							
Bewill		Milton Johns							
Bossk^{TS}		Alan Harris	Alan Harris						
Lando Calrissian^{TS} ^{O}		Billy Dee Williams	Billy Dee Williams						Billy Dee Williams
Chief Ugnaught		Jack Purvis							
Dengar^{TS}		Morris Bush	Morris Bush						
Bren Derlin		John Ratzenberger							
Boba Fett^{TS} ^{TF}		Jeremy Bulloch Jason Wingreen^{V} John Morton	Jeremy Bulloch		Daniel Logan				
K-3PO		Chris Parsons							
Derek "Hobbie" Klivian^{TS}		Richard Oldfield							
Lobot		John Hollis							
Lorth Needa		Michael Culver							
Kendal Ozzel		Michael Sheard							
Palpatine Darth Sidious^{TS} ^{O}		Marjorie Eaton Clive Revill^{V} Ian McDiaramid^{E}	Ian McDiarmid	Ian McDiarmid	Ian McDiarmid	Ian McDiarmid	Ian McDiarmid^{A}^{V}		Ian McDiarmid
Firmus Piett		Kenneth Colley	Kenneth Colley						
Dak Ralter		John Morton							
Carlist Rieekan		Bruce Boa							
Zev Senesca		Christopher Malcolm							
Maximilian Veers		Julian Glover							
Yoda^{TS} ^{O}		Frank Oz^{V}	Frank Oz^{V}	Frank Oz^{V}	Frank Oz^{V}	Frank Oz^{V}	Frank Oz^{A}^{V}	Frank Oz^{V}	Frank Oz^{V}
Zuckuss		Cathy Munroe							
=== Introduced in Return of the Jedi ===
Gial Ackbar^{TS}			Tim Rose Erik Bauersfeld^{V}				Tim Rose Erik Bauersfeld^{V}	Tim Rose Tom Kane^{V}	
Amanaman			Ailsa Berk						
Wol Cabbashite			Mike Quinn						
Salacious Crumb			Tim Rose Mark Dodson^{V}						
Bib Fortuna			Michael Carter Erik Bauersfeld^{V}	Matthew Wood					
Yarna d'al' Gargan Fat Dancer			Claire Davenport						
Jabba the Hutt^{TS} ^{O}	Ben Burtt^{V}^{E}		David Barclay Toby Philpott Mike Edmonds Larry Ward^{V}						
Tiaan Jerjerrod			Michael Pennington						
Sila Kott			Poppy Hands						
Malakili			Paul Brooke						
Droopy McCool^{TS}			Deep Roy						
Mon Mothma^{TS} ^{O}			Caroline Blakiston			Genevieve O'Reilly			
Nien Nunb			Richard Bonehill; Mike Quinn Kipsang Rotich^{V}				Mike Quinn Kipsang Rotich^{V}	Mike Quinn	Mike Quinn Kipsang Rotich^{V}
Hermi Odle			Philip Herbert						
Oola			Femi Taylor						
Max Rebo			Simon J. Williamson						
Ree-Yees			Richard Bonehill Mike Quinn Paul Springer						
Sy Snootles^{TS}			Tim Rose Mike Quinn Annie Arbogast^{V}						
Teebo			Jack Purvis						
Tessek			Gerald Home						
Wicket W. Warrick^{TS} ^{TF}			Warwick Davis						Warwick Davis
=== Introduced in The Phantom Menace ===
Amee				Katie Lucas					
Padmé Amidala^{TS}^{O}				Natalie Portman	Natalie Portman	Natalie Portman			
Fodesinbeed Annodue				Greg Proops^{V} Scott Capurro^{V}					
Ebenn Q3 Baobab				Ben Burtt					
Sio Bibble^{TS}				Oliver Ford Davies	Oliver Ford Davies	Oliver Ford Davies			
Jar Jar Binks^{TS}				Ahmed Best	Ahmed Best	Ahmed Best			
Diva Funquita				Amanda Lucas					
Adi Gallia^{TS}				Gin Clarke					Angelique Perrin^{V} ^{C}
Nute Gunray^{TS}				Silas Carson	Silas Carson	Silas Carson			
Tey How				Amanda Lucas^{V}					
Dineé Ellberger				Celia Imrie					
Jerus Jannick				Dominic West					
Qui-Gon Jinn^{TS}				Liam Neeson	Liam Neeson^{V} ^{C}				Liam Neeson^{V} ^{C}
Jira				Margaret Towner					
Ki-Adi-Mundi^{TS}				Silas Carson	Silas Carson	Silas Carson			
Darth Maul^{TS} ^{O}				Ray Park; Peter Serafinowicz^{V}					
Rugor Nass				Brian Blessed^{V}					
Ric Olié				Ralph Brown					
Quarsh Panaka				Hugh Quarshie					
Sabé				Keira Knightley					
Saché				Sofia Coppola					
Sebulba				Lewis MacLeod^{V}					
Shmi Skywalker^{TS}				Pernilla August	Pernilla August				
Gavyn Sykes				Christian Simpson					
TC-14				John Fensom; Lindsay Duncan^{V}					
Finis Valorum^{TS}				Terence Stamp					
Wald				Warwick Davis					
Watto				Andy Secombe^{V}	Andy Secombe^{V}				
Weazel				Warwick Davis					
Mace Windu^{TS} ^{O}				Samuel L. Jackson	Samuel L. Jackson	Samuel L. Jackson			Samuel L. Jackson^{V} ^{C}
Yaddle				Phil Eason					
=== Introduced in Attack of the Clones ===
Adnama					Amanda Lucas				
Cordé					Verónica Segura				
Count Dooku Darth Tyranus^{TS} ^{O}					Christopher Lee	Christopher Lee			
Dormé					Rose Byrne				
Dannl Faytonni					Anthony Daniels	Anthony Daniels			
Jango Fett^{TS}					Temuera Morrison				
Jamillia					Ayesha Dharker				
Dexter Jettster					Ronald Falk				
Zett Jukassa Warpoc Skamini					Jett Lucas	Jett Lucas			
Cliegg Lars					Jack Thompson				
Achk Med-Beq					Ahmed Best				
Lunae Minx					Katie Lucas				
Jocasta Nu^{TS}					Alethea McGrath				
Bail Organa^{TS} ^{O}					Jimmy Smits	Jimmy Smits			
Poggle the Lesser^{TS}					Marton Csokas^{V}				
Aayla Secura^{TS}					Amy Allen	Amy Allen			Jennifer Hale
Gregar Typho					Jay Laga'aia	Jay Laga'aia			
Luminara Unduli^{TS}					Mary Oyaya	Fay David			Olivia d'Abo^{V} ^{C}
Zam Wesell					Leeanna Walsman				
=== Introduced in Revenge of the Sith ===
Apailana						Keisha Castle-Hughes			
Cody^{TS} ^{O}						Temuera Morrison			
Jeremoch Colton						Jeremy Bulloch			
Cin Drallig^{TS}						Nick Gillard			
Janu Godalhi						Pablo Hidalgo			
Grievous^{TS} ^{O}						Matthew Wood^{V}			
Lachichuk						Julian Khazzouh			
Tion Medon						Bruce Spence			
Baron Papanoida^{TS}						George Lucas			
Chi Eekway Papanoida^{TS}						Katie Lucas			
Terr Taneel						Amanda Lucas			
=== Introduced in The Force Awakens ===
Bala-Tik							Brian Vernel		
BB-8^{TS}							Dave Chapman Brian Herring Bill Hader^{V} Ben Schwartz^{V}	Dave Chapman Brian Herring	Dave Chapman Brian Herring
Taslin Brance							Emun Elliott		
Kaydel Ko Connix							Billie Lourd	Billie Lourd	Billie Lourd
Cypress							Gerald W. Abrams		
Poe Dameron^{TS}							Oscar Isaac	Oscar Isaac	Oscar Isaac
Caluan Ematt							Andrew Jack	Andrew Jack	
Finn FN-2187^{TS}							John Boyega	John Boyega	John Boyega
FN-2199							Liang Yang; David Acord^{V}		
Pamich Nerro Goode							Crystal Clarke	Crystal Clarke	
Armitage Hux							Domhnall Gleeson	Domhnall Gleeson	Domhnall Gleeson
Harter Kalonia							Harriet Walter		
Maz Kanata^{TS}							Lupita Nyong'o	Lupita Nyong'o	Lupita Nyong'o
Kaplan							Pip Torrens		
Tasu Leech							Yayan Ruhian		
Niv Lek							James McArdle		
Mitaka							Sebastian Armesto		
Bazine Netal							Anna Brewster		
Jessika Pava							Jessica Henwick		
Phasma^{TS}							Gwendoline Christie	Gwendoline Christie	
Unkar Plutt^{TS}							Simon Pegg		
Bollie Prindel							Ian Whyte	Ian Whyte	
PZ-4CO							Nathalie Cuzner		
Razoo Qin-Fee							Iko Uwais		
Kylo Ren Ben Solo^{TS}							Adam Driver	Adam Driver	Adam Driver
Rey^{TS}							Daisy Ridley Cailey Fleming^{Y}	Daisy Ridley	Daisy Ridley Cailey Fleming^{Y} Josefine Irrera Jackson^{Y}
Korr Sella							Maisie Richardson-Sellers		
Crokind Shand							Cecep Arif Rahman		
Snoke							Andy Serkis	Andy Serkis	Andy Serkis^{V} ^{C}
Statura							Ken Leung		
Teedo^{TS}							Kiran Shah David Acord^{V}		
Lor San Tekka							Max von Sydow		
Thanisson							Thomas Brodie-Sangster		
C'ai Threnalli							Paul Kasey	Paul Kasey	
Unamo							Kate Fleetwood		
Temmin "Snap" Wexley							Greg Grunberg		Greg Grunberg
Wollivan							Warwick Davis		
Yolo Ziff							Stefan Grube		
=== Introduced in The Last Jedi ===
Larma D'Acy								Amanda Lawrence	Amanda Lawrence
Temiri Blagg								Temirlan Blaev	
Moden Canady								Mark Lewis Jones	
DJ								Benicio del Toro	
Amilyn Holdo								Laura Dern	
Tallissan "Tallie" Lintra								Hermione Corfield	
Slowen Lo								Joseph Gordon-Levitt^{V}	
Lovey								Lily Cole	
Master Codebreaker								Justin Theroux	
Edrison Peavey								Adrian Edmondson	
Dobbu Scay								Mark Hamill^{V}	
Stomeroni Starck								Noah Segan	
Paige Tico								Veronica Ngo	
Rose Tico								Kelly Marie Tran	Kelly Marie Tran
Jaycris Tubbs								Jamie Christopher	
Wodibin								Warwick Davis	
=== Introduced in The Rise of Skywalker ===
Aftab Ackbar									Chris Terrio^{V} Tom Wilton
Zorii Bliss									Keri Russell
D-0									J. J. Abrams^{V}
Jannah									Naomi Ackie
Kanan Jarrus^{TS}									Freddie Prinze Jr.^{V} ^{C}
Beaumont Kin									Dominic Monaghan
Klaud									Nick Kellington
Babu Frik									Shirley Henderson^{V}
Enric Pryde									Richard E. Grant
Dathan									Billy Howle^{C}
Miramir									Jodie Comer^{C}
Ahsoka Tano^{TS} ^{O}									Ashley Eckstein^{V} ^{C}
Oma Tres									John Williams
Wrobie Tyce									Vinette Robinson

== Other films ==
List indicators

This section includes characters who have appeared in films outside the Skywalker Saga.

- An empty grey cell indicates the character was not in the film.
- ^{A} indicates an appearance through archival footage or audio.
- ^{C} indicates a cameo role.
- ^{V} indicates a voice-only role.
- ^{Y} indicates a younger version of the character.
- ^{TS} indicates the character appears in a television series.
- ^{TF} indicates the character appears in a television film.

Character	Star Wars: The Clone Wars	Rogue One: A Star Wars Story	Solo: A Star Wars Story	The Mandalorian and Grogu
Character	2008	2016	2018	2026
=== Introduced in The Skywalker Saga ===
Padmé Amidala^{TS}	Catherine Taber^{V}			
Raymus Antilles		Tim Beckmann		
Wedge Antilles^{TS}		Denis Lawson^{V}		
C-3PO^{TS} ^{TF}	Anthony Daniels^{V}	Anthony Daniels		
Lando Calrissian^{TS}			Donald Glover	
Chewbacca^{TF}			Joonas Suotamo	
Cody^{TS}	Dee Bradley Baker^{V}			
Jan Dodonna^{TS}		Ian McElhinney		
Count Dooku Darth Tyranus^{TS}	Christopher Lee^{V}			
Garven Dreis		Drewe Henley^{A}		
Cornelius Evazan		Michael Smiley		
Grievous^{TS}	Matthew Wood^{V}			
Jabba the Hutt^{TS}	Kevin Michael Richardson^{V}			
Obi-Wan Kenobi^{TS}	James Arnold Taylor^{V}			
Darth Maul^{TS}			Ray Park Sam Witwer^{V}	
Mon Mothma^{TS}		Genevieve O'Reilly		
Bail Organa^{TS}		Jimmy Smits		
Leia Organa^{TS} ^{TF}		Ingvild Deila Carrie Fisher^{A}		
Palpatine Darth Sidious^{TS}	Ian Abercrombie^{V}			
Hurst Romodi		Andy de la Tour		
Han Solo^{TS} ^{TF}			Alden Ehrenreich	
Wilhuff Tarkin^{TS}		Guy Henry Peter Cushing^{A}		
Darth Vader Anakin Skywalker^{TS}	Matt Lanter^{V}	James Earl Jones^{V} Spencer Wilding Daniel Naprous		
Jon "Dutch" Vander		Angus MacInnes^{A}^{V}		
Weazel			Warwick Davis	
Mace Windu^{TS}	Samuel L. Jackson^{V}			
Yoda^{TS}	Tom Kane^{V}			
Wullf Yularen^{TS}	Tom Kane^{V}			
=== Introduced in television series ===
Barro^{TS}				Hemky Madera
Embo^{TS}				Dave Filoni^{V}
Saw Gerrera^{TS}		Forest Whitaker		
Janu Coin^{TS}				Jonny Coyne
The Mandalorian Din Djarin^{TS}				Pedro Pascal
Garazeb "Zeb" Orrelios^{TS}				Steve Blum^{V}
Carson Teva^{TS}				Paul Sun-Hyung Lee
Trapper Wolf^{TS}				Dave Filoni
=== Introduced in The Clone Wars ===
Rex^{TS}	Dee Bradley Baker^{V}			
Ahsoka Tano^{TS}	Ashley Eckstein^{V}			
Ziro the Hutt^{TS}	Corey Burton^{V}			
Rotta the Huttlet^{TS}	David Acord^{V}			Jeremy Allen White^{V}
Asajj Ventress^{TS}	Nika Futterman^{V}			
=== Introduced in Rogue One ===
Cassian Andor^{TS}		Diego Luna		
Bistan Space Monkey		Nick Kellington		
Weeteef Cyubee		Warwick Davis		
Davits Draven^{TS}		Alistair Petrie		
Galen Erso		Mads Mikkelsen		
Jyn Erso^{TS}		Felicity Jones Beau & Dolly Gadson^{Y}		
Lyra Erso		Valene Kane		
Jaldine Gerams		Geraldine James		
Chirrut Îmwe		Donnie Yen		
Nower Jebel		Jonathan Aris		
K-2SO^{TS}		Alan Tudyk		
Orson Krennic^{TS}		Ben Mendelsohn		
Baze Malbus		Jiang Wen		
Jav Mefran		Francis Magee		
Antoc Merrick		Ben Daniels		
Farns Monsbee		Simon Farnaby		
Tynnra Pamlo		Sharon Duncan-Brewster		
Dunstig Pterro		Tony Pitts		
Barion Raner		Ariyon Bakare		
Bodhi Rook		Riz Ahmed		
Raddus^{TS}		Paul Kasey; Stephen Stanton^{V}		
Tivik		Daniel Mays		
Heff Tobber		Toby Hefferman		
Stordan Tonc		Jordan Stephens		
Vasp Vaspar		Fares Fares		
Moroff		Ian Whyte		
=== Introduced in Solo ===
Tobias Beckett			Woody Harrelson	
Val Beckett			Thandiwe Newton	
Rio Durant			Jon Favreau^{V}	
Karjj			Kiran Shah	
L3-37			Phoebe Waller-Bridge	
Enfys Nest			Erin Kellyman	
Lady Proxima			Linda Hunt^{V}	
Qi'ra^{TS}			Emilia Clarke	
Ralakili			Clint Howard	
Rebolt			Ian Kenny	
Tak			Anthony Daniels	
Dryden Vos			Paul Bettany	
=== Introduced in The Mandalorian and Grogu ===
Hogsbreth				Matthew Willig
Hugo Durant				Martin Scorsese^{V}
Ward				Sigourney Weaver

== See also ==
- Lists of Star Wars cast members
- List of Star Wars television series actors
- Star Wars Holiday Special actors
- Caravan of Courage: An Ewok Adventure actors
- Ewoks: The Battle for Endor actors
