= Canady =

Canady is a surname. Notable people with the surname include:

- Alexa Canady (born 1950), American medical doctor
- Charles T. Canady (born 1954), Chief Justice of the Supreme Court of Florida
- Jadon Canady (born 2003), American football player
- Kevin Canady (born 1969), American professional wrestler
- Moden Canady, First Order captain in Star Wars: The Last Jedi
- NiJaree Canady (born c. 2003), American softball player
- Stephen D. Canady (1865–1923), American politician and businessman

== See also ==
- Canady, Missouri, a ghost town, United States
- Canada (disambiguation)
