= Darth Maul =

Star Wars character

- Star Wars character
- Ray Park as Maul (Note: Promotional image for Solo: A Star Wars Story (2018))
- First appearance: The Phantom Menace (1999)
- Created by: George Lucas
- Portrayed by: Ray Park (Note: Star Wars: Episode I – The Phantom Menace and Solo)
- Voiced by: Peter Serafinowicz (Note: The Phantom Menace and Lego Star Wars); Sam Witwer (Note: The Clone Wars, Lego: The Empire Strikes Out, Disney Infinity 3.0, Rebels, Battlefront II, Solo, Lego: The Skywalker Saga, and Maul – Shadow Lord); Other: Gregg Berger (Note: The Phantom Menace: The Video Game); Clint Bajakian (Note: Super Bombad Racing); Jess Harnell (Note: Racer Revenge); Stephen Stanton (Note: Battlefront II); Lee Tockar (Note: Lego: Droid Tales)

In-universe information
- Species: Dathomirian Zabrak
- Gender: Male
- Occupation: Dark Lord of the Sith; Leader of the Shadow Collective; Ruler of Mandalore
- Affiliation: Nightbrothers; Sith Order; Trade Federation; Shadow Collective: Sub-groups: Death Watch (leader); Black Sun; Pyke Syndicate; Hutt Clan; Crimson Dawn
- Weapon: Double-bladed lightsaber
- Family: Mother Talzin (mother); Savage Opress (brother); Feral (brother); Legends: Kycina (mother)
- Home: Dathomir
- Master: Darth Sidious
- Apprentices: Savage Opress; Devon Izara; Dryden Vos; Qi'ra

Darth Maul, also known simply as Maul, is a character in the Star Wars franchise created by George Lucas. He first appeared in the prequel film Star Wars: Episode I – The Phantom Menace (1999). Maul returned in the animated television series Star Wars: The Clone Wars (2008–2014; 2020), Star Wars Rebels (2014–2018) and Star Wars: Maul – Shadow Lord (2026) as well as the standalone film Solo: A Star Wars Story (2018). Lucas had intended for Maul to feature in the sequel film trilogy, but these plans were discarded when Disney acquired Lucasfilm in 2012.

Maul is introduced as a Zabrak from Dathomir and a powerful Sith Lord, having been trained in the ways of the dark side of the Force as Darth Sidious's first apprentice. He mortally wounds Jedi Master Qui-Gon Jinn during the Battle of Naboo before being bisected by Qui-Gon's Padawan, Obi-Wan Kenobi. Fueled by his hatred, Maul survives and is driven insane until his brother, Savage Opress, finds him over a decade later during the Clone Wars. Once his mind and body are restored with magic and cybernetics by the Nightsister Mother Talzin, Maul becomes an independent criminal mastermind and endures as Obi-Wan's archenemy. In his obsessive quest for revenge against Obi-Wan, Maul unites various crime syndicates under his leadership, orchestrates a takeover of Mandalore, and murders Obi-Wan's lover, Duchess Satine Kryze. Despite being captured by Sidious for becoming a rival, Maul escapes before the rise of the Galactic Empire. He renounces his Sith title of "Darth", rebuilds his criminal organization, and manipulates Ezra Bridger into helping him find Obi-Wan on Tatooine, where the two old rivals have a final confrontation that ends in Maul's death.

The character was portrayed by Ray Park and voiced by Peter Serafinowicz for his initial appearance in The Phantom Menace. Park reprised the role in Solo, where he was dubbed by Sam Witwer, who provided Maul's voice for all of his animated appearances. Maul has also appeared in various forms of media in the Star Wars Expanded Universe, including novels, comic books, and video games. Despite his limited screen time in The Phantom Menace and the film's mixed reception, Maul has become a fan favorite character and a widely recognised villain in popular culture for his intimidating appearance and double-bladed lightsaber. His resurgence and expanded characterization in The Clone Wars further heightened his popularity within the Star Wars fandom and earned him a cult following.

== Characteristics ==
=== Concept and creation ===
Maul was characterized by The Phantom Menace director George Lucas as a thing of nightmares. An early concept had Maul a masked figure, something that could rival Darth Vader. Later, concept artist Iain McCaig started masking an illustration of production designer Gavin Bocquet in tape. Both McCaig and Lucas liked the result, described as "a kind of Rorschach pattern". The final drawing had McCaig's own face, with the skin removed, and some Rorschach experimentation (dropping ink onto paper, folding it in half then opening). McCaig stated the tattoo design was inspired by facial musculature stating "If you were to strip the flesh off your face right now...the muscles would form a Darth Maulish pattern."

Maul's head originally had feathers, based on prayer totems, but the Creature Effects crew led by Nick Dudman interpreted those feathers as horns, modifying his features into those common in popular depictions of the devil.

His clothing was also modified, from a tight body suit with a muscle pattern to the Sith robe based on samurai pleats, because the lightsaber battles involved much jumping, spinning, running, and rolling.

George Lucas decided to resurrect Darth Maul for The Clone Wars after developing the character of Savage Opress. Series co-creator Dave Filoni initially responded to Lucas's idea as unrealistic, because, "It's over. He's cut in half. How does that work?" According to Filoni, Lucas replied, "I don't know. Figure it out."

=== Portrayal ===
Darth Maul was portrayed by actor and martial artist Ray Park in Star Wars: Episode I – The Phantom Menace and Solo: A Star Wars Story. Peter Serafinowicz provided the character's voice in The Phantom Menace. Sam Witwer replaced Serafinowicz when the character returned in Star Wars: The Clone Wars, and reprised the role in numerous subsequent projects, most notably in Star Wars Rebels, Solo and Star Wars: Maul – Shadow Lord. Gregg Berger, Clint Bajakian, Jess Harnell, Stephen Stanton, and Lee Tockar have also voiced him in other appearances in less prominent capacities.

=== Lightsaber ===
Darth Maul is known for his use of a red double-bladed lightsaber, which he wields similar to a Bō, or staff. In Star Wars: Episode I – The Phantom Menace, the prop for his lightsaber was made of resin, cast over a metal rod to which the two blades were attached.

=== Vehicles ===
Darth Maul pilots a modified FC-20 speeder bike called Bloodfin and his personal starship, a heavily modified Star Courier called Scimitar (also known as the Sith Infiltrator). After his defeat during the Battle of Naboo, his former master reclaims the ship.

== Appearances ==
=== Films ===
==== The Phantom Menace ====
In his first appearance, Darth Maul is sent by his master Darth Sidious (Ian McDiarmid) to capture Queen Padmé Amidala (Natalie Portman) of Naboo to force her to sign a treaty that would legitimize the Trade Federation's invasion of the planet. Maul manages to kill her starship to Tatooine, where he briefly engages Jedi Master Qui-Gon Jinn (Liam Neeson), who has been assigned to protect the Queen. After escaping Tatooine, Qui-Gon concludes that Maul is a Sith Lord and informs the Jedi Council on Coruscant of the Sith's return. In the film's climax, Maul duels Qui-Gon and his apprentice Obi-Wan Kenobi (Ewan McGregor). He is able to kill Qui-Gon and knock Obi-Wan down a shaft, but Kenobi propels himself out of the pit and uses Qui-Gon's lightsaber to bisect Maul, sending the two parts of his body falling down the shaft.

==== Solo: A Star Wars Story ====
At the end of Solo, Maul (Ray Park) is revealed as the mastermind behind the crime syndicate Crimson Dawn. (Note: According to writer Jon Kasdan, the name was a reference to Maul's red appearance.) After killing Dryden Vos (Paul Bettany), whom Maul had appointed as his figurehead, smuggler Qi'ra (Emilia Clarke) tells Maul that Vos was betrayed and murdered by Tobias Beckett (Woody Harrelson) and his accomplices, neglecting to mention Han Solo (Alden Ehrenreich) and Chewbacca's (Joonas Suotamo) involvement. Seeming to believe her, Maul commands Qi'ra to meet with him on Dathomir and ignites his lightsaber, telling her that they will work more closely from that point forward.

==== Scrapped sequel trilogy appearance ====
In George Lucas's unused outlines for the Star Wars sequel trilogy, Maul was intended to serve as the main antagonist. The cybernetic Maul would have become "the godfather of crime in the universe" and the master of Darth Talon.

=== Animated series ===
==== The Clone Wars ====
Darth Maul in the seventh and final season of The Clone Wars

Prior to Maul's proper return in The Clone Wars animated series, Lucas considered revealing that Revenge of the Sith villain General Grievous was actually Maul in disguise.

In season three of the series, Maul is revealed to have once been a member of the Nightbrothers clan from the planet Dathomir. Mother Talzin, the leader of the Nightsister witches and Maul's biological mother, sends her other son Savage Opress to find Maul, who has been living in the outer rim since he was bisected and presumably killed by Obi-Wan Kenobi over a decade prior. (Note: As depicted in Star Wars: Episode I – The Phantom Menace.)

In season four, Maul is found by Savage on the junkyard planet of Lotho Minor. Having been stranded there and driven insane, Maul uses the Force to construct a spider-like apparatus to replace his severed legs. Savage brings Maul back to Dathomir, where Talzin uses Nightsister magick to restore his mind and outfit him with a pair of cybernetic legs. Seeking revenge against Obi-Wan, Maul goes on a killing spree to bait and capture the Jedi with Savage's help, but Asajj Ventress comes to Obi-Wan's aid and helps him escape.

In season five, Maul takes Savage as his apprentice and begins building his own criminal empire. The two travel to Florrum in a bid to seize the territory of Weequay pirates led by Hondo Ohnaka. The Jedi track them down and Maul duels Obi-Wan while Savage fights and kills Adi Gallia. Obi-Wan and Hondo's crew work together to force the brothers to flee in an escape pod. Days later, Maul and Savage are found floating in dead space by the Mandalorian terrorist group Death Watch. Maul joins forces with their leader, Pre Vizsla, to take control of Mandalore and exact revenge against their common enemy, Obi-Wan. They recruit the Black Sun, Pyke Syndicate and Hutt Clan to form a criminal syndicate called the Shadow Collective. Maul engineers Vizsla's rise to power by ordering the crime families to attack Mandalore, allowing the Death Watch to capture them and gain the public's support. However, Vizsla betrays and imprisons Maul and Savage, though they easily break free, and the former challenges Vizsla to a fight for leadership of Mandalore. Maul overpowers Vizsla, beheading him with his own darksaber, and effectively takes over Mandalore, putting disgraced former Prime Minister Almec, whom Satine had imprisoned for corruption, in power as a puppet leader. However, a faction of Death Watch, led by Bo-Katan Kryze, refuse to accept an outsider as their leader, and escape to plan a coup. Maul later masterminds a trap for Obi-Wan, knowing that Satine will contact the Jedi Master for help because of their romantic past. When Obi-Wan arrives on Mandalore, he is quickly captured and forced to watch as Maul executes Satine. Obi-Wan is later freed by Bo-Katan's Death Watch faction.

Meanwhile, Darth Sidious learns of Maul's survival and the power he has accumulated, and, fearing that his former apprentice may challenge him, travels to Mandalore to address the matter. After a lightsaber duel against Maul and Savage, Sidious easily kills the latter, enraging Maul, who briefly holds his own against Sidious, but is ultimately defeated. Sidious proceeds to torture Maul with Force lightning, but spares his life because he has other uses for him.

In the seventh and final season, following the events of the comic book Darth Maul: Son of Dathomir, Maul still leads the Shadow Collective, now consisting of the Black Sun, the Pyke Syndicate, and Crimson Dawn, and rules over Mandalore, until Bo-Katan enlists the Galactic Republic's help in deposing him. During the Siege of Mandalore story arc (which is set during Revenge of the Sith), Bo-Katan's Death Watch faction and a branch of the 501st Clone Legion, led by Ahsoka Tano and Commander Rex, lead an assault on Maul's Mandalorian forces to draw him out of hiding. Unbeknownst to them, Maul has foreseen the events that are about to unfold, and orders his Shadow Collective lieutenants to go into hiding, warning them of the Galactic Empire that is about to be created. While confronting Ahsoka, Maul shares his visions with her, revealing that Darth Sidious will destroy both the Republic and the Jedi Order, and invites her to join him so that they may stand a chance to stop him. However, when Maul reveals that Ahsoka's former master, Anakin Skywalker, will be turned to the dark side by Sidious, and that he had hoped to kill Anakin to prevent this from happening, Ahsoka engages Maul in a lightsaber duel, which ends with the latter's capture. (Note: Ray Park returned to physically portray Maul through motion-capture for the duel scene.)

Maul is subsequently imprisoned in a Mandalorian device that renders his Force powers useless, and is set to be taken to Coruscant to stand trial. However, at this point Sidious executes Order 66, which causes clone troopers from all across the galaxy to betray and attempt to execute their Jedi generals. Maul is almost killed himself, but Ahsoka, who survived her clones' attempt on her life, rescues him, so that he may serve as a distraction while she and Rex try to escape. However, during his rampage, Maul destroys the ship's hyperdrive, causing it to crash on a nearby moon. He then betrays Ahsoka and steals her shuttle to escape, though Ahsoka and Rex manage to find another way off the ship before it crashes.

==== Rebels ====
An older Maul appears in the season two finale of Star Wars Rebels, which takes place between Solo and A New Hope. Tracked by an Imperial Inquisitor called the Eighth Brother, Maul is stranded on the ancient Sith world of Malachor, where he is discovered among the ruins by series protagonist Ezra Bridger. Introducing himself as an "old master" and seeking revenge against Sidious, Maul wins Ezra's trust by denouncing the Sith. He encourages the boy to use the dark side, and leads him into an ancient Sith temple, where they discover a holocron that Maul claims can give them the knowledge needed to defeat the Sith. After recovering it, the two find Ezra's master Kanan Jarrus and Ahsoka Tano locked in battle with the Eighth Brother, as well as the Fifth Brother and the Seventh Sister. Maul—having cast aside the title of Darth—reveals a new lightsaber disguised as a walking stick and joins the Jedi in battling the Inquisitors.

After the Inquisitors retreat, Maul suggests to the Jedi that they team up, telling them that he cannot defeat Darth Vader on his own. Although Kanan and Ahsoka do not trust him, they only cooperate upon the insistence of Ezra. Once all three Inquisitors are killed, Maul turns on the Jedi, revealing his intention to take Ezra as his apprentice and that he tricked him into activating the temple. After blinding Kanan with his lightsaber, Maul briefly duels Ahsoka and then the now-blind Kanan, who knocks him off the temple's edge. However, he survives the fall and escapes Malachor in the Eighth Brother's TIE fighter.

In the third season, Maul takes the Ghost's crew hostage and threatens to kill them unless Kanan and Ezra bring both the Sith and Jedi holocrons to him. Maul takes the crew to a remote base in the Outer Rim where he awaits Kanan and Ezra's arrival. He lures Kanan away from Ezra, and makes an attempt on his life. Afterwards, Maul and Ezra hazardously unite the holocrons, allowing them to see visions of their desires: Ezra sees images of a way to destroy the Sith, images including "twin suns", while Maul sees a vision of his own. Kanan begs Ezra to look away before he sees too much of the dark side, while Maul tells him to ignore Kanan and keep looking. Ezra heeds his master's words and breaks off the connection, which causes a great explosion. Maul escapes in the confusion, uttering, "He lives."

Maul returns after finding the rebels' secret base. He tells Ezra that because the connection was severed, they got bits and pieces of each other's visions. After the holocrons were destroyed, Maul discovered another way to get the information he needed. He travels to Dathomir with Ezra, and recreates a Nightsister spell to temporarily meld his and Ezra's minds, which leads them to realize that they are both looking for Obi-Wan Kenobi. However, in return for the provided answers, the Nightsister spirits demand a sacrifice, and possess Kanan and Sabine Wren when they arrive to rescue Ezra. After escaping from them, Maul makes Ezra one final offer to become his apprentice, and leaves him behind to try and rescue his friends after he refuses.

Eventually, in the "Twin Suns" episode, Maul tracks down Obi-Wan to Tatooine, but gets lost in the desert, and decides to use Ezra to lure his old nemesis out of hiding. His plan is ultimately successful as he tracks Ezra's movement, who came to find and warn Obi-Wan of Maul, until he is rescued by the Jedi Master. As Ezra is ushered away by Obi-Wan, Maul threatens his old enemy, and quickly deduces that he is not only hiding, but is protecting someone. Realizing that he cannot allow Maul to escape with this information, Obi-Wan ignites his lightsaber and prepares to duel Maul, who is swiftly defeated in a few strikes. As he lies dying in Obi-Wan's arms, Maul asks if the person he is protecting is the "Chosen One", and Obi-Wan replies that he is. Maul declares that this "Chosen One" will avenge them, and passes away.

==== Tales of the Jedi ====
In Tales of the Jedi, while he never appears, he is mentioned by Count Dooku and Darth Sidious in the episode "The Sith Lord".

==== Maul – Shadow Lord ====
Maul serves as the titular character in the animated series Star Wars: Maul – Shadow Lord. Set during the period following the Clone Wars, the former Sith Lord attempts to rebuild his criminal syndicate on Janix, a planet unknown to the Empire, while teaching a new apprentice. The first season was released on Disney+ in 2026, with Sam Witwer voicing Maul. Over the season, Maul rebuilds his crew, pursues the Jedi Padawan Devon Izara as his apprentice, and is hunted by the Empire's Inquisitors. In the finale he fights Darth Vader and is shown afraid and in pain, which the character had not been before. During the fight he Force-pushes Devon's master, Eeko-Dio Daki, toward Vader, who kills him; Devon, not knowing that Maul betrayed her master, agrees to become his apprentice. A deal Maul makes with Dryden Vos of Crimson Dawn sets up his cameo in Solo: A Star Wars Story. A second season is set for release in 2027.

=== Comics ===
==== Darth Maul (2017) ====
In 2017, Marvel released Star Wars: Darth Maul, a 5-issue prequel series centered on Maul before the events of The Phantom Menace. The comic details upon Maul's training under Darth Sidious, and how he was manipulated into hating the Jedi for leading the Sith to near-extinction. The main plot follows Maul's quest to kill his first Jedi, allying himself with several bounty hunters and facing a crime lord along the way.

==== Age of the Republic (2018–19) ====
Maul had his own one-shot comic book within the 2018–19 Age of the Republic miniseries, which depicts short stories of various characters during the Galactic Republic era. In his story, Maul poses as a member of a criminal cartel to kill a Force-sensitive thief for Darth Sidious, and experiences a vision of an alternate life as a peace-keeping Jedi, which he denies, much to Sidious' content. The story takes place shortly before The Phantom Menace.

==== Darth Maul: Son of Dathomir (2014) ====
Dark Horse Comics produced Darth Maul: Son of Dathomir based on the scripts and storyboards of an unproduced four-episode story arc intended for the seventh season of The Clone Wars. The events of the comic are set some time after Maul's defeat at Darth Sidious' hands in the fifth season of the television series, and before his eventual return in the seventh season.

After defeating Maul and killing his brother Savage Opress, Sidious takes him to a Separatist prison, where Count Dooku tortures him for information about the Shadow Collective. Prime Minister Almec arranges Maul's escape and the latter then heads back to Zanbar to command the Death Watch army. However, he is followed by General Grievous and his droids, who battle with Maul and the Mandalorians. While they put up a fierce fight, Maul and his minions are ultimately overwhelmed by the droids. During the battle, Maul tears through the droid ranks and attacks Grievous, but is overpowered and forced to retreat. Afterwards, Maul confers with Mother Talzin and plots to draw out Sidious by capturing Dooku and Grievous. The scheme works, and Talzin is able to restore herself to her physical form, but she sacrifices herself to save Maul. Although Maul escapes with a company of loyal Mandalorians, the Shadow Collective has disintegrated due to the conflict with Sidious, as the Hutts, Pykes, and Black Sun have all abandoned Maul.

=== Novels ===
==== Ahsoka ====
In flashbacks during the novel Star Wars: Ahsoka, it is revealed that during the final days of the Clone Wars, Maul and his forces were besieged on Mandalore by an army of clone troopers led by Ahsoka Tano and Captain Rex. (Note: Anakin Skywalker and Obi-Wan Kenobi were dispatched to Mandalore with Ahsoka, but were immediately called back to Coruscant to rescue Chancellor Palpatine, thus leading into the opening sequence of Revenge of the Sith.) During the siege, Maul confronts and duels Ahsoka. Though he proves to be the stronger fighter, the former Jedi outwits him and traps him in a ray shield. However, before Maul can be taken into official custody, Order 66 is enacted and the clone troopers following Ahsoka turn on her, with the exception of Rex. With Rex's life in peril, Ahsoka abandons the chance of killing Maul, allowing the former Sith to escape once again.

The events of this battle were later adapted and altered by the final episodes of the seventh season of The Clone Wars, as described earlier.

=== Video games ===
Maul has been featured in a number of Star Wars games, as a boss or a playable character.

- Star Wars: Episode I – The Phantom Menace (1999)
- Star Wars: Jedi Power Battles (2000)
- Star Wars: Demolition (2000)
- Star Wars: Super Bombad Racing (2001)
- Star Wars: Obi-Wan (2001)
- Star Wars: Galactic Battlegrounds (2001)
- Tony Hawk's Pro Skater 3 (2001) - Maul appears as an unlockable secret character via a licensing deal.
- Star Wars: Racer Revenge (2002)
- Lego Star Wars: The Video Game (2005)
- Star Wars: Battlefront II (2005)
- Lego Star Wars II: The Original Trilogy (2006) - Maul can be unlocked as a playable character only if the player has a save game of the original Lego Star Wars game on their memory card.
- Lego Star Wars: The Complete Saga (2007)
- Star Wars Battlefront: Renegade Squadron (2007)
- Star Wars: The Force Unleashed (2008) - the shape-shifting droid PROXY takes on the form of Maul while fighting Starkiller; Maul is also available as an in-game "skin" for Starkiller via downloadable content.
- Star Wars Battlefront: Elite Squadron (2009)
- Clone Wars Adventures (2010)
- Lego Star Wars III: The Clone Wars (2011)
- Angry Birds Star Wars II (2013)
- Disney Infinity 3.0 (2015)
- Galaxy of Heroes (2015)
- Force Arena (2017)
- Star Wars Battlefront II (2017)
- Lego Star Wars: The Skywalker Saga (2022)
- Fortnite: Battle Royale (2023)

Maul would have been the main character of Battle of the Sith Lords, an action-adventure title set before The Phantom Menace that was canceled in 2011.

=== Legends ===
With the 2012 acquisition of Lucasfilm by The Walt Disney Company, most of the licensed Star Wars novels and comics produced since the original 1977 film Star Wars were rebranded as Star Wars Legends and declared non-canon to the franchise in April 2014.

==== Comics ====
Darth Maul is a 4-issue comics series published by Dark Horse Comics featuring Maul. The series is set in the shortly before the Battle of Naboo in Episode I – The Phantom Menace. The story follows Maul in his mission to destroy the leadership of the well-feared crime syndicate Black Sun. Maul spends his time serving under Darth Sidious, killing countlessly. His main target in the series is the leader of Black Sun, some time before Prince Xizor takes command of it.

Several sources depict Maul returning from the dead in several different forms. The story "Resurrection" from Star Wars Tales #9 depicts a cult creating a duplicate of Maul as a replacement for Darth Vader, only for Vader to kill him. The story Phantom Menaces in Star Wars Tales #17 (set after Return of the Jedi) depicts Luke Skywalker visiting Maul's home planet of Iridonia in an ambassadorial capacity, where he faces a "solid state hologram" of Maul projected from Maul's salvaged brain as part of a scientist's attempt to recreate Maul as Iridonia's "champion". Luke recognizes the disruption that Maul's existence is causing in the Force, and shuts down the life-support systems keeping the brain alive.

In 2005, Dark Horse Comics published Star Wars: Visionaries, a compilation of non-canonical short comics made by the creators of Revenge of the Sith. One story, "Old Wounds", depicts Maul with longer horns on his head, having survived his bisection at Obi-Wan's hands, with his missing bottom half replaced with cybernetic legs, similar to those of General Grievous (and his eventual revival in The Clone Wars). He follows Obi-Wan throughout the galaxy, finally tracking him down on Tatooine a few years after the events of Revenge of the Sith. Maul taunts Obi-Wan, saying that after he kills him, he will take a toddler-aged Luke Skywalker to his master, Emperor Palpatine. Maul plans to kill Vader and resume his rightful place at Palpatine's side. He ignites his new double-bladed lightsaber and engages Obi-Wan in a duel, but Obi-Wan again bests him in combat, cutting off his opponent's horns. Maul is killed by a blaster bolt to the head from Owen Lars. Obi-Wan thanks Owen, and says he will take Maul's body into the desert and burn it.

==== Novels ====
In early 2012, a young adult novel entitled Star Wars: The Wrath of Darth Maul was released by Scholastic. The novel showed Maul's training under Sidious as a young boy with his spider droid named TD-D9 and he went undercover at the Orsis Academy, formign a bond with a young Nautolan girl Kilindi Matako. Maul is also featured prominently in comic series starting in this period, The Clone Wars: The Sith Hunters and Darth Maul: Death Sentence. Set around the various episodes of The Clone Wars that featured Maul, the two books detail his and Savage Opress' journey across the galaxy as they seek vengeance on the Jedi.

In the 2012 novel Darth Plagueis, the titular Sith lord sends his apprentice, Darth Sidious, to the Force-rich world of Dathomir. A Dathomiri witch, or Nightsister, senses Sidious' power in the Force and approaches him. Assuming he is a Jedi, she begs him to take her Zabrak infant son. She realizes that Sidious is not a Jedi, and explains how she is trying to save her son from a Nightsister named Talzin, who killed Maul's father. It is implied that Maul has a twin brother and that Talzin is only aware of one child. Sidious realizes the infant is strong in the Force, and would become a threat if found by the Jedi. Concealing the existence of his own master, Sidious raises Maul to believe that he is a Sith apprentice, but he actually intends him to be an expendable minion rather than an heir. Maul himself acknowledges his shortcomings, such as his limited understanding of politics, even as he tries to become a true Sith.

===== Darth Maul: Shadow Hunter =====
Darth Maul: Shadow Hunter is a novel by Michael Reaves released on February 1, 2001. It is a prequel novel occurring about six months before the events of The Phantom Menace. The cover art was by David Stevenson. Del Rey aired a TV commercial for the novel in 1999. As portrayed in the novel, Maul was raised by Sidious for as long as he can remember. Sidious then trains Maul as a Sith, marking his body with Sith tattoos. Maul initially goes on several missions of terror for his master, killing politicians, crime bosses, merchants and warlords.

Sidious meets secretly with his Neimoidian contacts in the Trade Federation to finalize details in the plan to blockade Naboo. One member of the delegation is missing; suspecting betrayal, Sidious orders Maul to hunt down the traitor. Maul completes this task, but learns that the traitor had recorded proof of the Sith's manipulation of the Naboo blockade on a holocron to sell for profit. A suicidal attack by a Trade Federation-hired bounty hunter interferes with Maul's plan and the holocron is purchased by a Corellian con man named Lorn Pavan. Pavan realizes the nature of the information and seeks to take it to the Jedi Temple. Maul, for his part, is ordered by Sidious to retrieve the holocron and kill Pavan and anyone else who might have the information. Meanwhile, a Jedi Padawan named Darsha Assant is faced with the Jedi trials to become a full-fledged Jedi Knight, and tries to save a member of Black Sun (which Maul had crippled in Saboteur).

Pavan attempts to do business with a Hutt crime lord in one of the lower levels in Coruscant, but Maul arrives and kills the Hutt. Pavan escapes into the caverns where they meet Darsha and her master. The Jedi begin escorting Pavan and his droid to the temple but Maul soon attacks them. Darsha's master is slain while attempting to buy time for the others. Pavan and Darsha escape various dangers of Coruscant's subterranean levels before finding themselves in another battle. Darsha, realizing that she cannot defeat Maul, draws out their duel long enough for Pavan's droid to repair a carbonite-freezing unit and seal Pavan and the droid inside it. Darsha plunges her lightsaber into a pile of volatile gas canisters, killing her and causing an explosion that Maul barely escapes. Upon surveying the scene, Maul feels no trace of Pavan in the Force, not realizing that the carbonite hibernation has made his lifeforce undetectable.

An automatic timer frees Pavan from hibernation and he goes after Maul on his own. Pavan follows Maul to a Republic space station and sneaks up on Maul, stunning him momentarily before he awakens, severs Pavan's right hand, and pursues him through the station's service tubes. Pavan barely makes it into a public area where Maul cannot follow, and unwittingly gives the holocron to Senator Palpatine of Naboo, not realizing that Palpatine is Maul's Sith Master. After recovering, Pavan starts to leave his quarters, only to be confronted by Maul, who kills him as a worthy opponent.

===== Darth Maul: Saboteur =====
Darth Maul: Saboteur is a novella by James Luceno. It was released in ebook form, with a length equivalent to about 55 printed pages, on February 1, 2001. It was also published in the back of the paperback edition of Michael Reaves' Darth Maul: Shadow Hunter.

The story is about Maul and takes place roughly a year before The Phantom Menace. It recounts Maul's first solo mission as "Darth Maul" and attempt to destroy two mining companies so the Trade Federation can take them over.

===== Maul: Lockdown =====
Maul: Lockdown is a Star Wars novel written by Joe Schreiber, released by Del Rey Books on January 28, 2014. It was the last novel to be released in the Star Wars Legends line of the franchise. Before the events of The Phantom Menace, Sith lords Darth Plagueis and Darth Sidious send their disciple Maul to a galactic prison called Cog Hive Seven to recover a powerful weapon. There, an insidious gambling empire pits the galaxy's most terrible criminals against each other in gladiatorial combat, and Maul must face Jabba the Hutt and various other horrifying obstacles to complete his mission. Maul poses as a prisoner to enter the gladiator games where he fights other prisoners like a Yuuzahn Vong warrior who Maul bested. Maul meets Komari Vosa, Dooku's former Padawan and High Priestess of the Bando Gora, and the two team up against a Syrox creature.

== In popular culture ==
Since the release of The Phantom Menace, Maul has proven to be a popular character. Whilst the movie received a mixed reaction from fans and critics alike, the character was one of the most highly praised parts of the film, despite his limited screen time. IGN named Maul the 16th greatest Star Wars character, noting, "Of the countless characters to walk in and out of the Star Wars saga, none looks or acts more badass than Maul." C-3PO actor Anthony Daniels said in his memoirs that Darth Maul is still one of his favourite characters in the saga - despite his brief appearance in The Phantom Menace.

Maul-related merchandise was popular among Hasbro Star Wars toy lines, with plastic recreations of his double bladed lightsaber and various action figures in his likeness developed. Maul was the focal point of the marketing campaign surrounding the 2012 re-release of The Phantom Menace, being featured on the packaging for the toy line.

Darth Maul appears as a skater in Tony Hawk's Pro Skater 3 being earned for completing all 54 goals and gaining all gold medals as Tony Hawk.

=== Darth Maul fan film ===
A Maul fan film titled Darth Maul: Apprentice was released on YouTube on March 5, 2016. Darth Maul is played by Ben Shammas.

=== "Darth Maul kids" viral videos ===
At least two videos of people trying to imitate Darth Maul have gone viral: the 2003 Star Wars Kid, which spawned an internet meme, and another which went viral in December 2017 of an 8-year-old Ontario boy pretending to be Darth Maul and displaying his martial arts skills.
