= Dryden Vos =

Character in Star Wars

- Star Wars character
- Paul Bettany as Dryden Vos
- First appearance: Solo: A Star Wars Story (2018)
- Last appearance: Maul: Shadow Lord (2026)
- Portrayed by: Paul Bettany
- Voiced by: Scott Whyte

In-universe information
- Species: Near-human
- Gender: Male
- Occupation: Leader of Crimson Dawn
- Affiliation: Crimson Dawn
- Master: Maul
- Apprentice: Qi'ra

Dryden Vos is a fictional character in the Star Wars franchise, portrayed by Paul Bettany in the film Solo: A Star Wars Story (2018) as the main antagonist. He is the public leader of the Crimson Dawn crime syndicate, under the control of the former Sith Lord Maul.

== Character ==
=== Creation and development ===
Dryden Vos was influenced by the characters Leo from the film Thief (whose actor Robert Prosky also collaborated with Solo director Ron Howard in the film Far and Away) and Don Draper from the television series Mad Men. Multiple ideas for his species were considered; early concept art depicted him as an avian or reptilian alien, as well as a Lasat. In the original script of Solo, Vos' base of operations was an island fortress "like Mont-Saint-Michel but with an elaborate system of canals", on the planet Taanab, but the writers later changed his headquarters to a starship yacht, inspired by a Russian vodka tycoon's gleaming white vessel that was one of the world's biggest yachts at the time.

=== Casting and portrayal ===
American actor Michael K. Williams was originally cast as Dryden Vos, portraying him through motion capture as a "half mountain lion, half human" alien. However, Williams was unable to return for reshoots due to scheduling conflicts with the film The Red Sea Diving Resort, so he was recast with Paul Bettany and the character was redesigned to a human-like appearance. Bettany had texted Howard to inquire in joining Solo and began filming in London two weeks later. He also has been a huge fan of Star Wars since he saw the original film at age six.

=== Description ===
Dryden Vos is a ruthless crime lord who serves as the public face of Crimson Dawn, while secretly answering to Maul. Although he shows good manners, he can kill anyone who displeases him without warning. Bettany described him as a "sociopath" and gangster with an "entrepreneurial spirit" who is "really good at hurting people", has "no foibles" and "demands tribute".

Dryden is stationed in his own luxury yacht First Light, where he hosts parties attended by socialites and high-ranking officials. He keeps a collection of rare artifacts and memorabilia from across the galaxy in his office, many of which reference past Star Wars stories. Vos is a practitioner of Teräs Käsi, which he taught his lieutenant Qi'ra, and wields a pair of Kyuzo petars, a double-bladed dagger, which Bettany described to be "kind of little knuckle-duster lightsabers". Another notable feature of Vos is his facial scars, which flush when he is angry. According to Ron Howard, Bettany's performance had inspired these visual effects:

The idea that the facial striations would intensify and diminish depending on his mood came after the [shoot] because Paul's performance was so mercurial and interesting in the way he would flare up and then be charming. That was suggested a little bit in the script, but mostly generated out of Paul's creativity. He was also so handsome and charismatic that we wanted to make him a little scarier, and actually went back and added the scene where you can see him hands-on killing a governor [...] He's like one of those animals that changes colors and can't help it, like a mood stone.

== Appearances ==
=== Films ===
==== Solo: A Star Wars Story ====
Dryden Vos is introduced in Solo: A Star Wars Story, as the figurehead of Crimson Dawn. He has hired the thief Tobias Beckett to steal a shipment of coaxium. Vos kills an Imperial regional governor in another meeting, before meeting with Beckett and his recruits, Han Solo and Chewbacca, to discuss their failed heist. He rebukes Beckett for underestimating Enfys Nest and her Cloud-Riders, warning he would be punished with death. When Han proposes a plan to steal unrefined coaxium from the spice mines of Kessel, Dryden is initially concerned it would destroy his alliance with the Pykes that control the mining operations, but authorizes it after Qi'ra convinces him and sends her to accompany the crew.

The theft is a success, but Han and Qi'ra become sympathetic to the Cloud-Riders' cause. They attempt to trick Vos, who reveals Beckett has reported their treachery to him and invites him to join them. Dryden sends his guards to kill Enfys Nest, but the Cloud-Riders ambush and defeat them since Han had anticipated Beckett and Vos' actions. Beckett then betrays Vos and escapes with the coaxium, leading to a fight between Han and Dryden. Qi'ra seems to side with Dryden at first, but turns on him and kills him by stabbing him in the chest. After Han leaves, Qi'ra contacts Maul about Vos' death, pinning it on Beckett.

=== Animated series ===
==== Star Wars: The Clone Wars ====
Dryden Vos makes a cameo in the Star Wars: The Clone Wars seventh season episode "The Phantom Apprentice", in which he is among the syndicate leaders in the Shadow Collective that Maul orders to go into hiding in preparation for the impending rise of the Galactic Empire.

==== Maul – Shadow Lord ====
Dryden Vos appears in Star Wars: Maul – Shadow Lord, where he is voiced by Scott Whyte. He offers Maul a deal in which he will help him escape Janix from the Imperial authorities in exchange for his assistance in installing Vos as the leader of Crimson Dawn. After rescuing Maul and his team, Vos reminds him of the bargain.

== Reception ==
Dryden Vos received a mixed reception from critics. In a review of Solo, Rodrigo Perez wrote "Paul Bettany oozes a mix of charm and menace as the rather enjoyable villain Dryden Vos, but he, nor any of the characters have a lot of contours." Johnny Oleksinski of New York Post opined that the character "resembles the worst kind of Pierce Brosnan-era 'James Bond' villains. He's got a bunch of unexplained scars, a vague eccentricity and no menace. You'll forget him by the time you reach the parking lot." Roger Moore of Rogers Movie Nation regarded Vos as "more whimsical and mercurial than menacing. He's just…wrong." Matt Zoller Seitz of RogerEbert.com commented that he "might be the first major player in a 'Star Wars' movie to make no impression at all, but the actor was probably doing the best he could under the circumstances".

Peter Travers of Rolling Stone praised Bettany for "making Voss [sic] such a seductive psycho", while Michael Roffman of Consequence of Sound called him "ravishing" in the role. Liam Gaughan of Collider lauded Bettany's performance, including his "Bond villain-esque elegance" and display of "sophisticated grace" when introducing Qi'ra as his associate, as well as "hamming it up" during his scenes of fighting Han and being killed by Qi'ra. Gaughan also believed Vos "doesn't need a lot of screen time in order to drive the story forward" and considered it a "brilliant choice" for him to not appear until the film's third act, "because the antagonist of Solo is really the realities of the criminal world itself, and it doesn't need to be tied to just one character."
