= Qi'ra =

Star Wars character

- Star Wars character
- Emilia Clarke as Qi'ra in Solo: A Star Wars Story (2018)
- First appearance: Most Wanted (2018)
- Last appearance: Star Wars Outlaws (2024)
- Created by: Jonathan Kasdan; Lawrence Kasdan; Rae Carson
- Portrayed by: Emilia Clarke
- Voiced by: Olivia Hack; Tamaryn Payne (Outlaws)

In-universe information
- Species: Human
- Gender: Female
- Title: Lieutenant (formerly)
- Occupation: Leader of Crimson Dawn
- Affiliation: White Worms (formerly); Crimson Dawn
- Fighting style: Teräs Käsi
- Significant others: Han Solo (formerly); Dryden Vos (formerly)
- Nationality: Corellian
- Master: Maul (Teräs Käsi); Dryden Vos (Teräs Käsi)
- Homeworld: Corellia

Qi'ra is a fictional character in the Star Wars franchise, first appearing in the 2018 film Solo: A Star Wars Story and portrayed by English actress Emilia Clarke. The character was introduced in the 2018 prequel novel Most Wanted by Rae Carson. A practitioner of Teräs Käsi, she is Han Solo's childhood best friend and first love from the planet Corellia. The pair live on the streets before she is captured and he flees the planet. In order to leave the planet herself, Qi'ra becomes a lieutenant in the Crimson Dawn crime syndicate under Maul, assuming control of the organization after his death, becoming its leader during the Galactic Civil War. She also appears in the animated series Star Wars Forces of Destiny, the Crimson Trilogy of comics, and video games including Star Wars Outlaws.

== Appearances ==
=== Film ===
==== Solo: A Star Wars Story ====
In the 2018 Star Wars Anthology film Solo: A Star Wars Story, Qi'ra is introduced as an orphaned street thief living on the shipbuilding world of Corellia. She and her lover, Han, attempt to use the valuable fuel source coaxium to bribe their way through a checkpoint to escape the planet and the criminal gang pursuing them. Qi'ra is apprehended, but urges Han to go on without her. He does, and vows to return for her.

Three years later, seeking funding to buy a ship to return to Corellia, Han participates in a coaxium heist that goes awry. He accompanies his new associate Tobias Beckett to explain their failure to Dryden Vos, a high-ranking crime boss in the Crimson Dawn syndicate. Han and Qi'ra are reunited, as she is now Vos's top lieutenant. Han suggests a risky plan to steal unrefined coaxium from the mines on the planet Kessel; Vos approves but insists that Qi'ra accompany the team. She leads them to Lando Calrissian, an accomplished smuggler and pilot who agrees to join the mission with his ship, the Millennium Falcon, in exchange for a share of the profits. The theft is a success, but Han and Qi'ra become sympathetic to the cause of the rebels who are trying to prevent the syndicates and the Galactic Empire from gaining greater domination over the galaxy. They attempt to trick Vos, but the double-crossing Beckett has already alerted the crime lord to their plan. Caught aiding Han, Qi'ra tells Dryden she will prove her loyalty to him by sacrificing something she loves, and advances on Han. She betrays and kills Vos instead, and sends Han after Beckett. Once alone, Qi'ra contacts Vos's superior, Maul, to inform him of the mission's failure and claim Vos's position within the syndicate; she blames the death of Vos on Beckett. Qi'ra then abandons Han and leaves for Dathomir to meet with Maul as he commands her.

=== Animated series ===
==== Star Wars Forces of Destiny ====
In the 2018 episode "Triplecross" of Star Wars Forces of Destiny, pirate Hondo Ohnaka and bounty hunter droid IG-88 pursue Qi'ra, who pits them against each other to collect the bounty on them.

=== Literature ===
==== Most Wanted ====
Qi'ra is introduced in the novel Most Wanted by Rae Carson. The novel focuses on Han and Qi'ra shortly before the events of Solo: A Star Wars Story. It was published by Disney-Lucasfilm Press on May 25, 2018, in concert with the film.

==== Crimson Trilogy ====
The crossover comic War of the Bounty Hunters, published on June 2, 2021, and set between the movies The Empire Strikes Back and Return of the Jedi, shows Qi'ra still alive, in control of the Crimson Dawn and plotting a return to power. The organization was thought to be destroyed after Maul's death on Tatooine by Obi-Wan Kenobi. Now, learning that Han Solo had become important to the Galactic Empire, the Rebel Alliance and the Hutt Clan and that he had also been frozen in carbonite, Qi'ra had her agents capture him from bounty hunter Boba Fett. War of the Bounty Hunters was only the start of the Crimson Trilogy of comics, which continued Qi'ra and Crimson Dawn's story in Crimson Reign and Hidden Empire, as Qi'ra leads the Dawn in an ultimately futile quest to overthrow Emperor Palpatine. Despite the failure of her plans, she contributes to the Empire's defeat during the Battle of Endor by revealing the existence of the second Death Star to the Alliance, and survives into the New Republic era.

=== Games ===
Qi'ra appears as a playable character in Star Wars: Galaxy of Heroes, the mobile RPG game developed by Capital Games and Published by Electronic Arts. She also appears in the 2024 Ubisoft game Star Wars Outlaws, as leader of Crimson Dawn.

=== Merchandise ===
Several toys of Qi'ra have been made available. Among them, a 12-inch Qi'ra (Corellia) figure which features a movie-inspired design, a six-inch action figure by Hasbro as part of the company's Star Wars: The Black Series toy line, a Funko Pop figurine, Lego Star Wars figurines, the Star Wars Nerf Qi'Ra blaster by Hasbro, a Star Wars Mighty Muggs figure, as well as T-shirts featuring the character.

== Character ==
=== Description ===
Qi'ra is introduced as an earnest thief in love with Han and dreaming of escape from the slums of the planet Corellia. They are separated by circumstance, and when they reunite years later, they have both been through life-changing experiences. Clarke called Qi'ra a "badass" who "kind of follows a femme fatale arc", and said, "She has a couple of guises, but essentially she is just fighting to stay alive. If you've got a really glamorous lady in a really sordid environment, you kind of know the glamour is hiding a few rough roads." Solo director Ron Howard described Qi'ra as secretive, slippery, and morally questionable—"a much different sort of a character" from Daenerys Targaryen, Clarke's character from the HBO series Game of Thrones. Clarke noted that her Solo character "isn't like the women that you've seen in Star Wars yet", and said that "Qi'ra is different from the other women I've played, but the similarity is her strength, and her survival instincts. She just has a bit more grit." She said, "We're going to hit you with a character that could very easily well be a dude, because you question her motives. That's really ... exciting in the Star Wars universe, because that has never happened." Clarke said, "Qi'ra's journey is definitely one of survival and strength. The way that I felt about her was yeah this girl has got a core of steel." Calling Qi'ra a "galactic femme fatale", Entertainment Weekly's Anthony Breznican wrote:

This is a character who doesn't want her full resume out there. She's a woman of shadows, of secrecy. She's a woman of many identities, the truest ones hidden away and only visible to those she trusts, which may be no one ... She's also one of the primary forces that shape [Han] the young smuggler.

Clarke said, "Every single part of her as a character reflects on the Han Solo that we know and love." She explained:

The beautiful thing about this Han Solo story is it's highlighting all of the most brilliant aspects of Han Solo the character and characterizing those aspects in characters that he meets on his journey to becoming who he is...You are seeing all of these different elements that make up who he is through the people and the interactions and the relationships just as we all do as human beings. We are simply the embodiment of our experiences...You see the beginnings of him, this loveable rogue. You get it fine-tuned throughout these relationships, and Qi'ra is one of those relationships that has an impact on him as a character...The goal is that the shadow of Qi'ra is there in Han as a character that we know. This girl is another texture that makes up who he is when we first meet him.

According to Solo co-writer Jonathan Kasdan, Qi'ra is Han's "formative experience with romance, and that experience very directly influences the relationships he has later on with people like Leia." Describing Qi'ra's relationship with Han, Clarke explained that "They grew up as comrades, essentially. They grew up as pals, as partners in crime. There is obviously the romantic side of things. But they grew up together. So they were kids together." She said that later, "within that relationship, the thing that you see with Qi'ra is that she is an enigma." Clarke also noted, "There is this underlying joy in an origin story because you know where they end up. And Qi'ra is nowhere to be seen, so...something has happened!...Something must have happened to affect him as a person, but for us fans not to know about her."

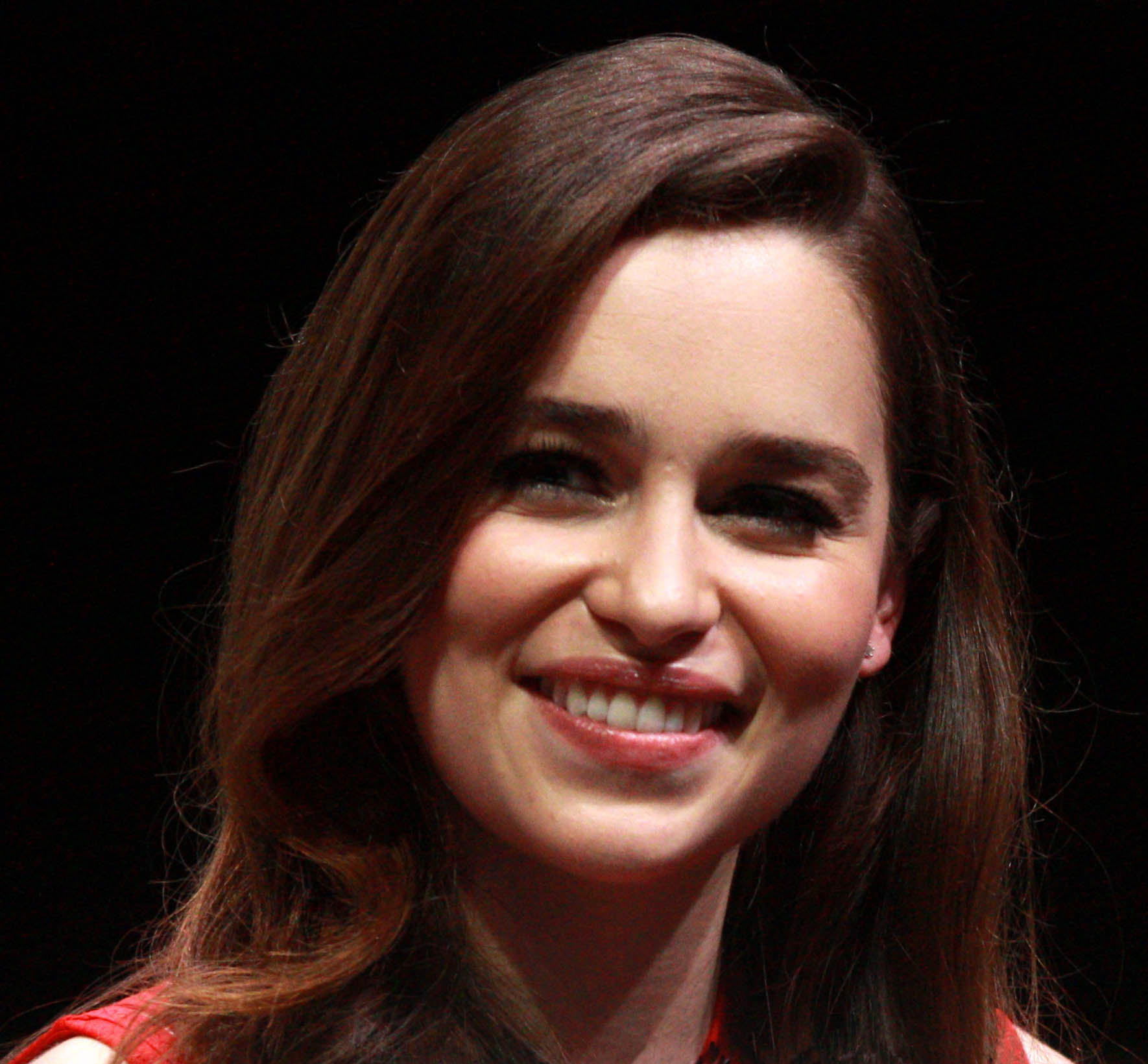
Emilia Clarke portrays Qi'ra in Solo: A Star Wars Story

=== Portrayal ===
In October 2016, Tessa Thompson, Naomi Scott, Zoë Kravitz, Emilia Clarke, Kiersey Clemons, Jessica Henwick, and Adria Arjona were being considered for the female lead in Solo: A Star Wars Story (named "Kura" in early drafts). Clarke, known for her role as Daenerys Targaryen in the HBO fantasy television series Game of Thrones, was cast the following month. Clarke told Vanity Fair that she struggled with the character under Solo's original co-directors, Phil Lord and Chris Miller, and sought advice from the film's father-and-son screenwriters, Lawrence and Jonathan Kasdan. She said of the role, "She'll be the sort of character that will keep you on your toes, and I think that was one of the biggest things that drew me to her as a character, and got me really excited."

Qi'ra was featured in the May 25, 2018 episode "Triplecross" of the 2D animated web series Star Wars Forces of Destiny, voiced by Olivia Hack.

== Reception ==
=== General ===
Qi'ra has been positively received by both critics and fans, with many referring to her as a standout, and the most fascinating aspect of Solo: A Star Wars Story. Pete Morrison of the Rebels Report called her the best character in the film. Stating that Emilia Clarke jumps from genre franchise in Game of Thrones to another in a galaxy far, far away and manages to have the most complex and interesting story arc of any character in the film. Futurism's Marguerita Tan wrote that "Qi'ra is a complex character who is not only intelligent and resourceful, but also someone who can look after herself". Tan concluded that it wasn't hard to understand why many fans were so keen to see the character in more on-screen adventures. Dana Brandt of The Daily Cardinal was critical of the character's arc stating that Qi'ra, and by extension her relationship with Han was underdeveloped. Bustle's Casey Cipriani suggests that Qi'ra may or may not have been a Sith and states that a female villain who can use the Force has never been portrayed in a Star Wars film.

=== Future ===
Many have expressed interest in a follow-up to Qi'ra's story. Derrick Clements of the Daily Herald wrote, "she is introduced as a character with depth and mystery to spare. Most of all, where the film leaves her is tremendously full of possibility". Writing for Comic Book Resources, Rita Dorsch proclaimed Qi'ra's turn in Solo to be the most interesting part of the film and went on to state that any follow-up needs to focus on her. Bustle's Angelica Floria stated, "the headstrong combatant played by Clarke seems to only have just begun her role in the Star Wars universe". She notes that Clarke signed on for multiple films and adds that the ending of Solo makes it clear that future Star Wars projects could continue the story of Qi'ra and Darth Maul's future with the Crimson Dawn.
