= Star Wars: Masters of Teräs Käsi =

1997 video game

- North American box art
- Developer: LucasArts
- Publisher: LucasArts
- Director: Tony Hsieh
- Designer: Tony Hsieh
- Programmer: Tony Hsieh
- Artist: Craig Rundels
- Composer: John Williams
- Series: Star Wars
- Platform: PlayStation
- Release: NA: November 25, 1997; EU: March 1998; JP: September 23, 1998
- Genre: Fighting
- Modes: Single-player, multiplayer

Star Wars: Masters of Teräs Käsi is a fighting game developed and published by LucasArts, which was released for the PlayStation in 1997. In the game's story, which is set in the Star Wars universe, the Emperor seeks retaliation for the destruction of the Death Star and recruits the mysterious Arden Lyn to battle in the art of Teräs Käsi, an unarmed combat discipline, against leaders of the Rebel Alliance. The game features Star Wars Legends characters, including the Emperor's Hand Mara Jade.

Development for Masters of Teräs Käsi was handled internally at LucasArts. It was both the first fighting game and first PlayStation title for the company, which presented challenges. Industrial Light & Magic assisted with motion capture, used for character animations. While spirits were high during the development and promotion of Masters of Teräs Käsi, the game was met with underwhelming reviews. Criticisms were directed at the sluggish movement of the characters and the unbalanced moves, though the basic concept of combining weapons-based and hand-to-hand combat was praised.

== Gameplay ==
Masters of Teräs Käsi features several characters from the Star Wars Legends universe. Here, Mara Jade fights Arden Lyn, who was created specifically for the game.

Star Wars: Masters of Teräs Käsi is a fighting game with a 3D gameplay element. Players are able to move their characters not only forwards and back using the left and right but can sidestep by using the up and down on the controller. There are three ways to achieve a victory: knocking out the opponent, forcing the opponent out of the ring, or having the most health when time runs out. Rounds are timed, and the player must win two of three rounds to be declared the winner of the match.

With the exception of Thok and Arden Lyn, all of the characters can fight either hand-to-hand or with a weapon, and alternate between the two mid-combat. In weapons mode, the controls are configured with three attack buttons and a kick button, while in hand-to-hand mode a button is assigned to each limb.

Characters have an array of melee moves and also a few ranged attacks. The Force does not make an appearance in the game in the traditional sense. Instead, all characters build up a "Force meter" as they fight. The player can execute special moves related to the strength of the meter, which can unleash increasingly devastating attacks. In the game's story mode the player selects a character and then fights through a series of opponents in a tournament setting. Upon victory in the tournament players receive a full motion video (FMV) ending for most characters.

== Plot ==
According to LucasArts, Masters of Teräs Käsi takes place during The Empire Strikes Back and Return of the Jedi. The destruction of the Death Star at the hands of Luke Skywalker has severely crippled the Galactic Empire. The Emperor seeks retaliation against Skywalker and the Rebel Alliance and recruits the services of the mysterious assassin Arden Lyn to eliminate the Alliance's key leaders. Luke and the others discover the Empire's plot and challenge Arden, face to face, in the art of Teräs Käsi, an unarmed combat discipline. This pits the rebels in one-on-one fights against the Empire's elite warriors.

=== Characters ===
- Luke Skywalker
- Han Solo
- Princess Leia
- Chewbacca
- Arden Lyn
- Boba Fett
- Hoar, a Tusken Raider
- Thok, a Gamorrean guard
- Darth Vader^{a}
- Stormtrooper^{a}
- Princess Leia^{a} (bikini)
- Mara Jade^{a}
- Jodo Kast^{a}

^aUnlockable character

== Development ==
The game was first announced at E3 1996 in Atlanta, Georgia. Internal company hopes were high during the development cycle. Tony Hsieh, project lead on Masters of Teräs Käsi, felt that it "[would] be hard to go wrong". While promoting the game in an issue of Star Wars Insider, writer Jack Lyon stated: "Short attention span Star Wars freaks will surely dig Masters of Teräs Käsi, LucasArts' first fighting game." Tekken was cited as one of the main influences on the game. A backstory was developed in which Darth Vader uses a mysterious master of Teräs Käsi, Arden Lyn, to eliminate high-ranking members of the rebellion in hand-to-hand combat. Development of the game took approximately 19 months according to lead artist Craig Rundels. Softimage was used for character creation. It was the first LucasArts title developed for the PlayStation. "No one had programmed a game on the PlayStation [...] We were learning the hardware, how to make art on it, how to program on it while we were developing Teräs Käsi." A demo was released on disc in the third issue of Official U.S. PlayStation Magazine.

No one had programmed a game on the PlayStation [...] We were learning the hardware, how to make art on it, how to program on it while we were developing Teräs Käsi.

— Lead Artist Craig Rundels on the difficulty of bringing the game to PlayStation

The motion capture facilities and software of LucasFilm partner Industrial Light & Magic (ILM) were used to generate the animation for the characters. The varying heights of the characters presented issues during development, and developers had to find ways to adjust the collision detection based on the opponent. To create the character's reactions to hits, the motion capture data was supplemented with hand-drawn animation. Each character was made up of at least 1,200 polygons. In developing the button combo system the staff wanted buttons to have context with the character's movements. "We want to make it so that when you hit the left button, you really hit with your left arm in a combo."

The character Arden Lyn was created specifically for the game. The character's design was initially much more androgynous than how she appears in the final game. Some obscure characters, such as Jodo Kast, were included in the game for no more reason than that a member of the development team liked the character and was able to build a compelling model. Gammorean guard Thok had previously had a film appearance within Jabba's palace in Star Wars: Episode VI – Return of the Jedi. Hoar was another new character created for the game. He was later given additional backstory, including ties to characters in Star Wars: Episode II – Attack of the Clones and the video game Star Wars: Jedi Knight: Dark Forces II. In an interview with Destructoid, Capcom's Seth Killian mentioned that Star Gladiator was originally pitched as a Star Wars fighting game. Ultimately the pitch did not succeed and LucasArts instead developed Masters of Teräs Käsi. To promote the game, Star Wars: The Official Magazine ran a contest in June 1998 in which a black PlayStation console with the Star Wars: Masters of Teräs Käsi logo on the top was given out.

"Teräs Käsi" refers to a martial art used in the game; both words have been borrowed from Finnish, meaning "steel" and "hand" respectively. The developers learned of Teräs Käsi from West End Games' Shadows of the Empire Source Book. Steve Perry, who came up with the concept of Teräs Käsi, said he did not speak Finnish, but "wanted something with a certain kind of sound, and the Norse languages have the kind of rhythm I like". (Note: Finnish is not one of the "Norse languages". They are Indo-European languages, while Finnish and other Finnic languages are Uralic languages.)

== Reception and legacy ==
Reception

Aggregate score
Aggregator	Score
GameRankings	53.83%

Review scores
Publication	Score
Electronic Gaming Monthly	6.75/10
Game Informer	6.75
GameSpot	4.4/10
IGN	4/10
Next Generation	2/5
Official U.S. PlayStation Magazine	3/5
PlayStation: The Official Magazine	3/5
Gamezilla	84/100

Star Wars: Masters of Teräs Käsi received mixed to negative reviews from critics. GameSpot's Jeff Gerstmann felt that the game played like it was "stuck in slow motion". He cited sluggish movement, uninteresting combos and overpowered force moves as weak points of the game. Adam Douglas of IGN similarly found the characters move too slowly: "I ended up mashing the buttons more than one time hoping the harder I pressed the quicker they’d respond. No such luck." GamePro, while echoing Gerstmann's criticism that the force moves are overpowered and citing difficulty entering in combos, called the game "a near-perfect blend of Star Wars imagery and solid fighting-game physics". They gave it a 4.5 out of 5 for control and a perfect 5.0 for graphics, sound, and fun factor, praising the character detail, animation, music, and combination of armed and unarmed combat.

Matt Skorupa of Gamezilla also gave it a more positive review. He stated that the game's character roster and varied environments were selling points for the game. Unlike most reviewers, Skorupa found the button combos simple and "easy to pull off". However, he noted that the main appeal was the Star Wars licensing, and that the game did not stand out enough from other fighting games to appeal to non-fans of the franchise. Next Generation's review of the game likewise judged Masters of Teras Kasi to be generic apart from its license. While they acknowledged that the combination of hand-to-hand and weapons-based combat was innovative, they found the use of different control schemes for the two modes cumbersome. They also shared Gerstmann and Douglas's opinion that the characters move too slowly. Douglas felt the game had solid graphics, and that the characters match their film and comic counterparts. He also said the game's hidden characters were "cool as well". Sushi-X of Electronic Gaming Monthly actually cited the Star Wars license as the game's primary weakness, arguing that in the Star Wars universe any character without a lightsaber would be quickly dismembered by any character with one. He and the other three members of the magazine's "review crew" criticized the overpowered force moves, difficult controls, and the gameplay's general tendency to devolve into using cheap and/or repetitive tactics, while praising the graphics, animation, and use of Star Wars elements, with all four assessing the game as overall decent but disappointing.

In the book Rogue Leaders: The Story of LucasArts, author Rob Smith said the game served as a reminder that "simply attaching the Star Wars name to a game wasn't enough", but noted that Teräs Käsi had successful sales during the 1997 holiday season, leaving ambiguous in what sense it "wasn't enough". In March 2004, GMR placed Masters of Teräs Käsi in its top five Star Wars game of all time. Kotaku's Patrick Klepek described it as "Sluggish, boring, and without much depth". His colleague Luke Plunkett called Masters of Teräs Käsi "possibly the worst Star Wars game ever made". Plunkett felt that it was a wasted opportunity, that it was "something that could have been worthwhile".

Since the release of Masters of Teräs Käsi some attempts have been made to re-introduce Star Wars to the fighting game genre. An untitled prototype Star Wars fighter was under development at Studio Gigante in 2005, but ultimately was rejected. The idea of using Star Wars characters in a fighting game would resurface when Yoda, Starkiller and Darth Vader became playable characters in Soulcalibur IV. Another Star Wars fighting game, Star Wars: The Clone Wars – Lightsaber Duels, was released in 2008. Like Masters of Teräs Käsi it received mixed reviews.

In the 2018 film Solo: A Star Wars Story, the character Qi'ra mentions she is trained in the art of Teräs Käsi. The second season of The Mandalorian also appears to depict some elements from the game.
