= Canady, Missouri =

Extinct town in Missouri, United States

Coordinates: 36.1645138°N 89.7536935°W

Canady is an extinct town in Pemiscot County, in the U.S. state of Missouri. A variant name was "Canady Switch".

A post office called Canady was established in 1904, and remained in operation until 1927. The community was named after John Canady, the proprietor of a local sawmill.
