= Han Solo =

Star Wars character

- Star Wars character
- Harrison Ford as Han Solo in a promotional image for Star Wars (1977)
- First appearance: Star Wars: From the Adventures of Luke Skywalker (1976)
- Last appearance: Star Wars Episode IX: The Rise of Skywalker
- Created by: George Lucas
- Portrayed by: Harrison Ford (Note: Original trilogy Sequel trilogy The Star Wars Holiday Special); Alden Ehrenreich (Note: Solo: A Star Wars Story)
- Voiced by: Various: Harrison Ford (Note: Lego Star Wars: The Force Awakens The Star Wars Holiday Special); John Armstrong (Note: Lego Star Wars: The Empire Strikes Out Various video games); Michael Daingerfield (Note: Lego Star Wars: The Yoda Chronicles Lego Star Wars: Droid Tales); David Esch (Note: Star Wars: Galactic Battlegrounds); Keith Ferguson (Note: Robot Chicken Mad The Lego Movie); Perry King (Note: Radio dramas); Lex Lang (Note: Star Wars: Rogue Squadron III Star Wars: Battlefront II); Katie Leigh (Note: Lego Star Wars: The Padawan Menace); A.J. LoCascio (Note: Forces of Destiny Lego Star Wars: The Skywalker Saga); Ross Marquand (Note: Phineas and Ferb); Max Mittelman (Note: Lego Star Wars: All Stars); Neil Ross (Note: Star Wars: Masters of Teräs Käsi Star Wars: Force Commander Star Wars: Rogue Squadron); Kiff VandenHeuvel (Note: Forces of Destiny); Fred Young (Note: Star Wars (pinball game))

In-universe information
- Species: Human
- Gender: Male
- Occupation: Smuggler; Cadet; General; Others in Legends (Note: Solo's occupations in the Star Wars Legends narrative universe include Lieutenant in the Imperial Navy and Corporal in the Imperial Army.)
- Affiliation: Galactic Empire; Rebel Alliance; New Republic; Resistance; Galactic Alliance (Note: Legends)
- Family: Shmi Skywalker (grandmother-in-law); Anakin Skywalker (father-in-law); Padmé Amidala (mother-in-law); Luke Skywalker (brother-in-law); Ben Solo (son); Others in Legends (Note: Solo's family members in the Star Wars Legends narrative universe include his father Jonash Solo, his mother Jaina Solo, his daughter Jaina Solo, and his sons Jacen Solo and Anakin Solo.)
- Spouses: Leia Organa; Sana Starros
- Significant other: Qi'ra
- Home: Corellia

Han Solo (/ˈhɑːn ˈsoʊloʊ/) is a fictional character in the Star Wars franchise. He first appeared in the original Star Wars film (1977) (Note: Originally titled Star Wars, the film was later retitled Star Wars: Episode IV—A New Hope.) and its novelization (1976). He later appeared in the films The Empire Strikes Back (1980), Return of the Jedi (1983), The Force Awakens (2015), and The Rise of Skywalker (2019); he is portrayed by Harrison Ford in all five of these films. In Solo: A Star Wars Story (2018), a younger version of the character is played by Alden Ehrenreich. In the animated web series Forces of Destiny (2017–2018), Solo is voiced by A. J. LoCascio and Kiff VandenHeuvel. Ford was nominated for the Saturn Award for Best Actor for his portrayal of Solo in Star Wars, and won the award for his performance in The Force Awakens.

In the original trilogy, Solo and his Wookiee friend Chewbacca are smugglers who are hired to transport Obi-Wan Kenobi and Luke Skywalker to Alderaan so they can deliver stolen plans for the Death Star. Solo eventually joins the Rebel Alliance in its struggle against the Galactic Empire and falls in love with Princess Leia. In the sequel trilogy, Solo joins forces with Leia, the scavenger Rey and the former stormtrooper Finn in a campaign against the First Order. Solo's son, Kylo Ren, is a leader in the First Order and eventually kills Solo.

Solo was chosen as the 14th greatest film hero by the American Film Institute, and was selected as the fourth greatest film character by Empire magazine. Entertainment Weekly ranked Solo as the seventh coolest hero in popular culture.

== Creation and development ==
George Lucas created the Star Wars franchise and both wrote and directed the original Star Wars film. In the earliest version of the screenplay, Solo was an alien of the Ureallian race with green skin, enormous gills and no nose. He was also a member of the "Jedi Bendu" and was acquainted with General Skywalker. The next draft of the script depicted Solo as a bearded, flamboyant pirate; Lucas made him human to better develop his relationships with the other human characters. After this alteration, Chewbacca became his alien sidekick. By the third draft, Solo had developed into the "tough James Dean style starpilot" that would appear in the finished film. Lucas also used Humphrey Bogart as a reference point for the character.

While developing the story for the first sequel, The Empire Strikes Back, Lucas described Solo as "coming to grips with accepting responsibility." An early plot line involved him being separated from Luke while on a crucial mission. Lucas thought Solo should meet with a business leader who deals with the Empire and with whom Solo has "some kind of relationship ... like [a] stepfather". In the finished film, Solo instead reunites with his old friend Lando Calrissian, an administrator willing to conduct business with the Empire. In early screenplay drafts of Revenge of the Sith (2005), a ten-year-old Solo helps Jedi Master Yoda locate General Grievous. The early scripts also revealed that Solo was raised by Chewbacca on the Wookiee homeworld Kashyyyk. Some concept art of the young Solo was created, but Lucas ultimately decided to remove the character from the film.

The screenplay for The Force Awakens was written by Michael Arndt, Lawrence Kasdan and the film's director, J. J. Abrams. In an early draft, Solo reconciled with Leia and survived the film, but Abrams felt his character was not contributing to the plot in a meaningful way. He realized that Solo's death at the hands of his son would move the story forward, while also giving Kylo Ren the chance to develop into a worthy successor to Darth Vader. Solo's appearance in the film was influenced by that of Rooster Cogburn in the film True Grit (2010).

Megan Farokhmanesh of The Verge noted that while Lucas pronounces Solo's first name "Han" (/hæn/), most characters in the films pronounce it "Hahn" (/hɑːn/). She observed that Solo's friend Lando Calrissian is the only character to pronounce it "Han" like Lucas, and that other characters shift to this pronunciation after Lando is introduced in The Empire Strikes Back. Portraying Lando in Solo: A Star Wars Story, Donald Glover deliberately used "Han" instead of "Hahn" for consistency.

== Portrayal ==
When casting Star Wars, Lucas had a preference for unknown actors. He initially resisted casting Ford as Solo, since Ford had previously worked with him on American Graffiti, and was therefore not unknown. Instead, Lucas asked Ford to assist with auditions by reading lines with other actors. However, Lucas was eventually won over by Ford, and cast him as Solo over many other actors who auditioned. (Note: Other actors who reportedly auditioned for the role of Han Solo include James Caan, Chevy Chase, Robert De Niro, Richard Dreyfuss, Steve Martin, Bill Murray, Jack Nicholson, Nick Nolte, Al Pacino, Burt Reynolds, Kurt Russell, Sylvester Stallone, John Travolta, Christopher Walken, and Perry King, who later played Solo in the radio series.) Mark Hamill, who plays Solo's companion Luke Skywalker, admired Ford's ability to re-write his character's dialogue. He observed Ford crossing out lines in the script and replacing them with modified versions which he felt were more appropriate for Solo. Other actors considered were John Travolta, Sylvester Stallone, Lee Majors and James Brolin.

== Characterization and analysis ==
In 1997, Lucas described Solo as "a cynical loner who realizes the importance of being part of a group and helping for the common good". In 2004, he described the character as the selfish sidekick of the selfless Luke.

The noted mythologist Joseph Campbell said of Solo, "He thinks he's an egoist; but he really isn't. That's a very loveable kind of human being. They think they're working for themselves, but there's something else pushing them." On another occasion Campbell said, "Solo was a very practical guy, at least as he thought of himself, a materialist. But he was a compassionate human being at the same time and didn't know it. The adventure evoked a quality of his character that he hadn't known he possessed".

== Appearances ==
=== Original trilogy ===
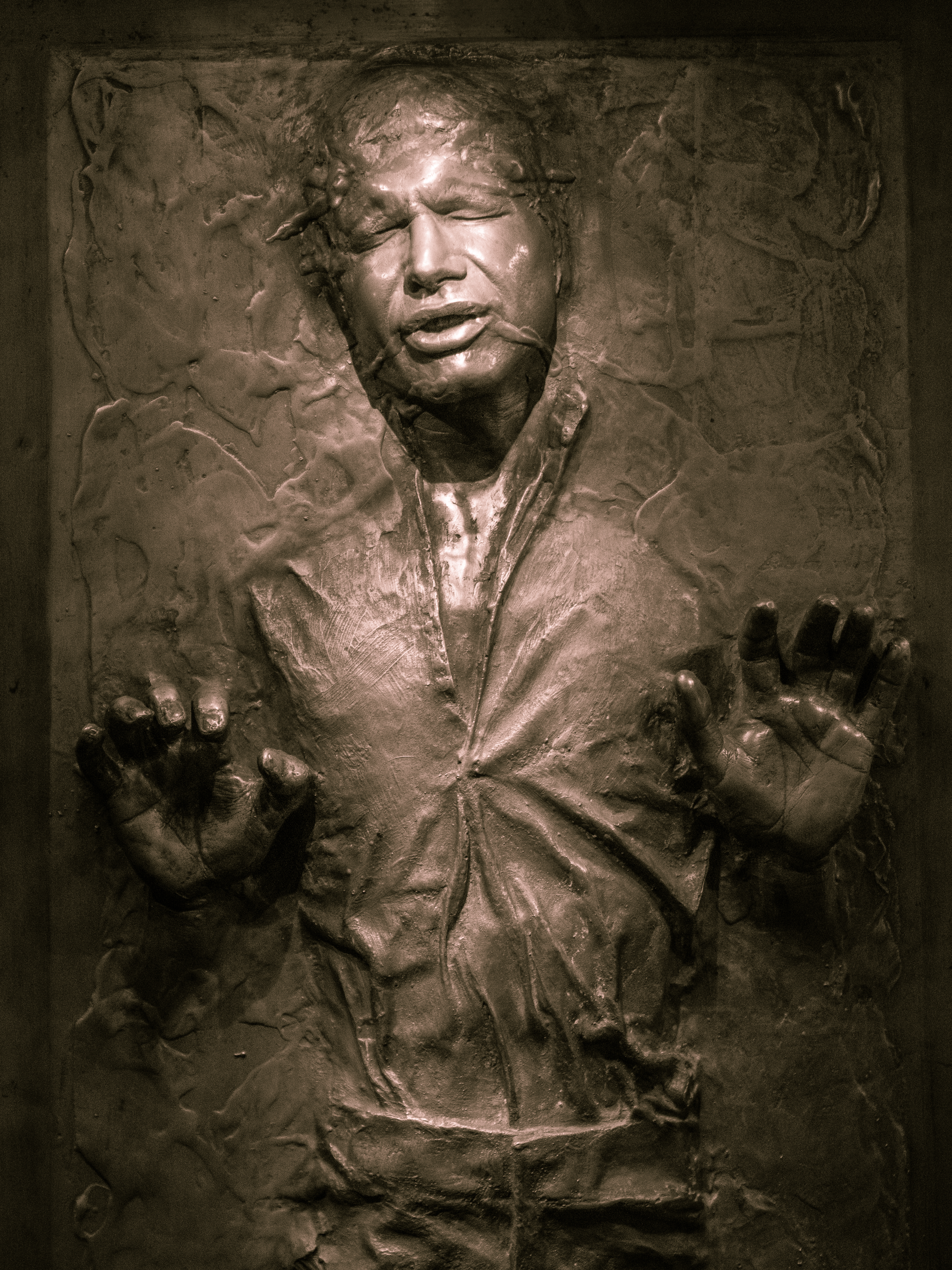
The carbonite prop used in The Empire Strikes Back

Solo was first introduced in the original film trilogy, and is portrayed by Harrison Ford in all three films. In Star Wars (1977), Solo and his Wookiee co-pilot Chewbacca accept a charter to transport Luke Skywalker and Obi-Wan Kenobi from Tatooine to Alderaan on their ship, the Millennium Falcon. Before they depart, Solo is cornered by the bounty hunter Greedo, who threatens him. Solo shoots and kills Greedo, (Note: The scene with Greedo was altered in re-releases of the film.) then boards the Falcon with his passengers. They are attacked by Imperial stormtroopers, but elude them by accelerating to light speed. When they arrive at their destination, they discover that Alderaan has been obliterated by the Death Star, the Empire's colossal battle station. The Falcon is captured and brought aboard the Death Star, but Solo and his companions avoid detection and infiltrate the station. When they discover that Princess Leia is being held captive, Luke convinces Solo and Chewbacca to help him rescue her by promising Solo a large reward. After delivering Luke and Leia to the Rebel Alliance, Solo collects his payment and prepares to leave. Luke asks him to aid the Rebels in their assault on the Death Star, but Solo refuses. He returns unexpectedly during the battle, saving Luke's life and allowing him to destroy the Death Star. Afterwards, Leia presents Solo and Luke with medals for their heroism.

Solo returns in The Empire Strikes Back (1980). He is still with the Rebel Alliance, serving at the headquarters on the ice planet Hoth. He intends to leave to pay off his debt to Jabba the Hutt, but delays his departure when Luke goes missing. Solo rides alone into freezing temperatures and finds Luke nearly dead from exposure. He builds a shelter and they survive until they are rescued. Later, Solo and Chewbacca destroy an Imperial probe droid, but not before the Empire is alerted to the location of the Rebel base. Solo, Chewbacca and Leia escape in the Millennium Falcon and fly into an asteroid field. While repairing the ship, Solo and Leia share a kiss. The group then seeks aid from Solo's friend Lando Calrissian in Cloud City. Under duress by the Empire, Lando betrays them to it, and Vader tortures Solo as part of his plan to trap Luke. Vader freezes Solo in carbonite and gives him to the bounty hunter Boba Fett, who plans to deliver him to Jabba. Before Solo is put into carbonite hibernation, Leia confesses her love for him.

In Return of the Jedi (1983), Solo is still imprisoned in carbonite. A year has elapsed, and the frozen Solo is a decoration in Jabba's palace on Tatooine. Leia enters the palace in disguise and liberates Solo from his hibernation, but Jabba captures them both. When Luke arrives to bargain for Solo's life, he too is imprisoned. Jabba tries to execute Solo, Luke and Chewbacca by feeding them to a Sarlacc, but they escape with the help of Leia and Lando. Returning to the Rebel fleet, the companions discover that the Empire is building a second Death Star, which is orbiting the forest moon of Endor. Solo, now a general in the Rebel Alliance, leads a strike team to disable the shield surrounding the battle station. After enlisting a tribe of Ewoks in a battle against Imperial forces, the Rebels remove the shield, which allows Lando and his team to destroy the Death Star. Solo then reunites with his friends on Endor to celebrate the fall of the Empire.

=== Sequel trilogy ===
Han Solo, as portrayed by Harrison Ford in Star Wars: The Force Awakens (2015)

Ford returns as Solo in two films of the sequel trilogy. In The Force Awakens (2015), set thirty years after Return of the Jedi, Solo has returned to his smuggling career. He and Chewbacca reclaim the Millennium Falcon—which they had lost—after the scavenger Rey and the renegade stormtrooper Finn use it to escape from Jakku. When Solo learns that Rey is looking for Luke, who disappeared years before, he takes them to his friend Maz Kanata, hoping she can deliver the droid BB-8 to the Resistance. While Solo, Finn and Rey are in Maz's castle, the First Order arrives and captures Rey. At the Resistance base, Solo reunites with Leia. It is revealed that their son, Ben Solo, was brought to the dark side by Supreme Leader Snoke. Ben trained as a Jedi under Luke, but left his training and became Kylo Ren, a warlord of the First Order. Leia asks Solo to bring him home, convinced there is still good in him.

Solo, Chewbacca and Finn land on the First Order's planet-converted superweapon, Starkiller Base, intending to disable its shield and rescue Rey. Solo finds his son, and pleads with him to abandon the dark side. Ren at first seems receptive to his father's request, but then ignites his lightsaber and kills him. In The Rise of Skywalker (2019), Ren experiences a vision of Solo, who again urges him to renounce the dark side. After a brief conversation, Ren throws away his lightsaber and once again becomes Ben Solo.

=== Solo: A Star Wars Story ===
The 2018 standalone film Solo: A Star Wars Story depicts a 19-year-old Han living as an orphan on the planet Corellia. He and his lover, Qi'ra, flee the White Worms criminal gang and attempt to leave Corellia on an outgoing transport, but Qi'ra is apprehended before she can board. Han vows to return for her and joins the Imperial Navy as a flight cadet. He is given the surname "Solo" by the recruiting officer, due to his lack of a family.

Han Solo, as portrayed by Alden Ehrenreich in Solo: A Star Wars Story (2018)

Three years later, Solo has been expelled from the Imperial Flight Academy for insubordination and now serves in the Imperial Army. While fighting on Mimban, he encounters a gang of criminals posing as Imperial soldiers. He wants to join them, but their leader Tobias Beckett gets him arrested for desertion and thrown into a pit to be eaten by a Wookiee named Chewbacca. Able to understand Chewbacca's language, Solo joins forces with him and the two escape. In need of additional crew members, Beckett brings Solo and Chewbacca aboard his ship. The crew tries to steal a shipment of coaxium—a valuable hyperspace fuel—but the mission fails. Solo and Chewbacca then accompany Beckett to a meeting with his overseer Dryden Vos, the leader of the Crimson Dawn crime syndicate. There, Solo reunites with Qi'ra, who is Vos's lieutenant. Solo suggests a plan to steal coaxium from the mines on the planet Kessel; Vos approves, but insists that Qi'ra accompany the crew.

Qi'ra leads them to Lando Calrissian, an accomplished smuggler who she hopes will lend them his ship, the Millennium Falcon. Solo challenges Lando to a game of sabacc, with the ship as the wager. Lando cheats to win, but agrees to join the mission in exchange for a share of the profits. The heist succeeds, partly due to Solo's piloting skills during the dangerous Kessel Run. Before the crew returns to Vos, they are intercepted by a group of pirates led by Enfys Nest. After a series of schemes and betrayals, Vos and his guards lie dead and Beckett has fled with the coaxium and taken Chewbacca as a hostage. Solo pursues Beckett and kills him, then gives the coaxium to Nest and her crew, who are sympathetic to the Rebel Alliance. Solo declines Nest's offer to join the Rebellion, instead returning to Lando's sabacc table for another wager. Solo prevents Lando from cheating this time, and wins ownership of the Falcon. Solo and Chewbacca then depart for Tatooine, where a crime lord is assembling a crew for a heist.

=== Comics ===
Solo is featured in the non-canon story Into The Great Unknown. Solo and Chewbacca enter hyperdrive and crash into the United States' northwest, Solo being killed by Native Americans almost immediately. The story features a time jump where Indiana Jones finds the skeleton remains of Solo on the Millennium Falcon.

Solo is featured in the 2015 Star Wars comic series. Issue #6 introduces Sana Starros as his wife, although later it is revealed that she married him as part of a plan to swindle a crime lord. Star Wars: Han Solo (2016) is a five-issue mini-series set between Star Wars and The Empire Strikes Back, which focuses on Solo participating in a race. The comic adaptation of Solo: A Star Wars Story reveals that Solo knew his father worked in the shipyards of Corellia. Han Solo – Imperial Cadet (2018) depicts Solo's rebellious days in the Imperial forces, while Han Solo & Chewbacca (2022) follows the smugglers as they do a job for Jabba, who sends Greedo to accompany them.

=== Other ===
In the 1978 television program Star Wars Holiday Special, Solo joins Chewbacca and his family on Kashyyyk for the Wookiee holiday Life Day. Ford portrays Solo in the live-action portions of the program, and voices him in the animated segment. Solo also appears in two episodes of the animated web series Forces of Destiny (2017–2018). He is voiced by Kiff VandenHeuvel in the episode "Tracker Trouble" and by A.J. LoCascio in "An Imperial Feast".

Han was added to Fortnite on November 2022 during their promotional Star Wars week.

Chuck portrays Han in Angry Birds Star Wars and Angry Birds Star Wars II, known as Chuck "Ham" Solo.

== Star Wars Legends ==
Following the acquisition of Lucasfilm by The Walt Disney Company in 2012, most of the licensed Star Wars novels and comics produced between 1977 and 2014 were rebranded as Star Wars Legends and declared non-canon to the franchise. The Legends works comprise a separate narrative universe. (Note: Attributed to multiple references:) In the Legends universe, Solo's parents are Jonash and Jaina Solo, and the Solo ancestry can be traced back thousands of generations. Three centuries before the events of Star Wars, one of Solo's ancestors ruled the planet Corellia. He established a constitutional monarchy, after which the lineage slowly lost power.

Between 1979 and 1980, Brian Daley wrote a series of novels called The Han Solo Adventures, which explore the smuggling exploits of Solo and Chewbacca before the events of the original trilogy. The 1994 Kevin J. Anderson novel Jedi Search explains how Solo incurred the debt to Jabba that haunts him throughout the films. The Han Solo Trilogy (1997–1998) by Ann C. Crispin develops the character's backstory, depicting him as a beggar and pickpocket throughout much of his youth. He becomes a pilot and, after his love interest Bria Tharen disappears, joins the Imperial Navy. He is dismissed when he refuses to skin Chewbacca for commandeering a ship trafficking Wookiee children; Chewbacca, in turn, swears a "life-debt" to Solo. The two become smugglers, and Solo wins the Falcon from Lando in a card tournament. Tharen, now a Rebel agent, employs him, Chewbacca, and Lando, then steals their valuables to aid the Rebellion. To recoup their losses, Solo and his Wookiee co-pilot accept a smuggling job from Jabba, but are forced to jettison their cargo. The trilogy ends with Solo meeting Luke and Obi-Wan in Mos Eisley, as depicted in Star Wars.

Solo plays a central role in many stories set after Return of the Jedi. In The Courtship of Princess Leia (1995), he marries Leia and has three children with her: the twins Jaina and Jacen, and a son named Anakin. In the 1999 novel Solo Command, Solo is in charge of a New Republic task force assigned to track down an Imperial warlord. Chewbacca dies saving Anakin's life in Vector Prime (1999), sending Solo into a deep depression. Anakin dies in Star by Star (2001), which compounds Solo's despair. At the end of the series, Solo accepts the losses of his loved ones and reconciles with his family. In the Legacy of the Force series (2006–2008), Jacen falls to the dark side and becomes the Sith Lord Darth Caedus. He plunges the galaxy into a civil war, and Solo disowns him. After Jacen's death, Solo and Leia adopt his daughter Allana.

== Family tree ==
Skywalker family tree

Aika Lars (Note: Appears in Pablo Hidalgo's Star Wars Character Encyclopedia: Updated and Expanded (2016))
Beru Whitesun

Cliegg Lars
Owen Lars

Shmi Skywalker-Lars
Anakin Skywalker; Darth Vader
Luke Skywalker

Jobal Naberrie (Note: Attack of the Clones (2002) and Revenge of the Sith (2005))	Ruwee Naberrie
Padmé Amidala	Bail Organa
Leia Organa	Han Solo
Ben Solo; Kylo Ren

House of Organa
Breha Organa

== See also ==
- Han shot first
- Skywalker family
