= Tobias Beckett =

Character in Star Wars

- Star Wars character
- Woody Harrelson as Tobias Beckett
- First appearance: Solo: A Star Wars Story (2018)
- Last appearance: Star Wars Adventures 4 (2021)
- Created by: Jonathan Kasdan; Lawrence Kasdan
- Portrayed by: Woody Harrelson

In-universe information
- Gender: Male
- Occupation: Criminal, smuggler, thief
- Affiliation: Beckett's gang Crimson Dawn
- Spouse: Val Beckett
- Homeworld: Glee Anselm

Tobias Beckett is a character in the 2018 film Solo: A Star Wars Story, where he is portrayed by Woody Harrelson. He is a thief working for the Crimson Dawn crime syndicate and the former mentor of Han Solo.

== Character ==
=== Creation ===
The character was based on the pirate Long John Silver from Treasure Island by Robert Louis Stevenson, which screenwriters Lawrence and Jonathan Kasdan re-read before diving into the script of Solo: A Star Wars Story. They looked to create a mentor/apprentice relationship between Beckett and Han Solo similar to that of Silver and Jim Hawkins in Treasure Island.

=== Portrayal ===
American actor Woody Harrelson portrays Tobias Beckett in Solo: A Star Wars Story. Harrelson admitted that he would have turned down the role so he could spend more time with family, but changed his mind after learning that Phoebe Waller-Bridge would be costarring in the film as the droid L3-37, since he was a big fan of Waller-Bridge's tragicomedy series Fleabag.

=== Description ===
Tobias Beckett is a thief and gunslinger who has assembled a gang of criminals to carry out robberies. He later becomes a father figure to Han Solo, but at heart he is a greedy person who manipulates others, including Han, for his own benefit. Solo director Ron Howard called Beckett a "charismatic" character and says he "really shapes Han really more than anybody". Lawrence Kasdan said, "He is a very tough criminal. And, as you might think with Woody, who has enormous humanity, it's not just that". Beckett's mentoring of Han has been regarded as having impacted Han as a person and helped him as a smuggler.

== Appearances ==
=== Solo: A Star Wars Story ===
Tobias Beckett is introduced in the 2018 Star Wars Anthology film Solo: A Star Wars Story as the leader of a gang of thieves, also consisting of his wife Val and Ardennian pilot Rio Durant. While posing as Imperial soldiers on the planet Mimban to steal an AT-hauler, Beckett and his crew encounter Han Solo, a young swamp trooper who tries to blackmail them into letting him join the crew. Beckett has him arrested for desertion and thrown into a pit to be fed to the Wookiee Chewbacca. After Han and Chewbacca escape, Beckett enlists them to steal a shipment of coaxium on Vandor and gives his DL-44 blaster to Han before the mission. Due to the intervention of the Cloud-Riders led by Enfys Nest, the theft goes awry and results in the deaths of Rio and Val.

Beckett then reveals to Solo that he was hired by the Crimson Dawn syndicate to steal the coaxium and that he would have to face death as a punishment for indebtedness. Accompanied by Han and Chewbacca, Beckett meets with Crimson Dawn kingpin Dryden Vos to explain their failure. They also find Han's lover Qi'ra, who is Vos' top lieutenant. Dryden approves of a plan by Han to steal unrefined coaxium from the spice mines of Kessel, and sends Qi'ra to accompany the crew. Qi'ra recruits smuggler and pilot Lando Calrissian, who recognizes Beckett as the killer of bounty hunter Aurra Sing.

During the mission, Beckett advises Han to not trust anyone and assume everyone will betray him. After stealing the coaxium, they go to Savareen to refine it, but they again encounter Enfys Nest, who reveals herself as a resistance fighter against the Galactic Empire and the Crimson Dawn. Han then hatches a plan, which he tells Beckett, to double-cross Vos and give the real coaxium to the Cloud Riders instead. Beckett seemingly leaves for Tatooine for a job, but in reality he informs Vos of the deception. However, Solo had anticipated this and the coaxium he was holding was in fact real. Beckett then betrays Vos, shooting the guards on his yacht. He takes the coaxium for himself and Chewbacca hostage, forcing him to carry it to his ship. Han later confronts Beckett, and shoots him in mid-sentence. (Note: This is a reference to "Han shot first".) In his last moments, Beckett praises Han's actions and tells him that he was planning to kill him before dying in Han's arms.

==== Related works and merchandising ====
The one-shot prequel comic Star Wars: Beckett, released in August 2018, focuses on Tobias Beckett's life before the events of Solo. Beckett also appears in the 2021 comic Star Wars Adventures 4.
