= List of Star Wars video game actors =

This article is a list of actors that appeared in video games set in the Star Wars franchise either as voice actors or in motion capture.

== List indicators ==
List indicators

This table includes main cast members, recurring characters, as well as notable guest stars.

- An empty cell indicates the character had no (major) appearance in the game.
- ^{DLC} indicates indicates the character appeared only in a DLC of the game / that the game has a DLC.
- ^{F} indicates the character previously appeared in a film.
- ^{TV} indicates indicates the character previously appeared in a TV series.
- ^{EU} indicates indicates the character originated in a novel or comic series.
- ^{MC} indicates indicates the actor portrayed the character through motion capture.

This list ignores actors who only appear as archive material from other media or for whom merely their likeness was used.

== 1990s ==
Character	Rebel Assault	X-Wing	Super SW.: ESB.	TIE Fighter	Dark Forces	Rebel A. II: The Hidden Empire	Shadows of the Empire	Jedi Knight: Dark Forces II^{DLC}	Masters of Teräs Käsi	Rebellion	Rogue Squadron	X-Wing Alliance	Episode I – TPM. game
Character	1993			1994	1995		1996	1997, 1998^{DLC}	1997	1998		1999	
Kyle Kartarn					Nick Jameson			Jason Court, Rino Romano^{DLC}					
Anakin Skywalker/Darth Vader^{F}		Clint Bajakian	Clint Bajakian	Scott Lawrence	Scott Lawrence	Scott Lawrence, C. Andrew Nelson			Clint Bajakian	Scott Lawrence			Jake Lloyd
Luke Skywalker^{F}		C. Andrew Nelson	C. Andrew Nelson				Bob Bergen		Bob Bergen	Bob Bergen	Bob Bergen	Bob Bergen	
Mara Jade^{EU}								Heidi Shannon^{DLC}	Edie Mirman				
Mon Mothma^{F}					Peggy Roberts-Hope			Peggy Roberts-Hope^{DLC}		Peggy Roberts-Hope			
Leia Organa^{F}							Lisa Fuson		Lisa Fuson	Lisa Fuson			
Grand Admiral Thrawn^{EU}				Tris King									
Han Solo^{F}									Neil Ross	Neil Ross	Neil Ross		
Boba Fett^{F}									Neil Ross				
Jan Ors					Julie Eccle			Angela Harry					
Morgan Katarn								Jacob Witkin					
Rom Mohc					Jack Angel								
8t88								Denny Delk					
Picaroon C. Boodle								Denny Delk					
Maw								Morgan Hunter					
Qu Rahn								Bennet Guillory					
Sariss								Valerie Wildman					
Yun								Rafer Weigel					
Jerec								Christopher Neame					
Boc Aseca								Time Winters					
Ka'Pa the Hutt								Roger Jackson^{DLC}					
Abron Mar								Terence McGovern^{DLC}					
Wedge Antilles^{F}											Robert Foster		
IG-88^{F}							Nick Tate						
Dash Rendar							John Cygan						
Guri							Lisa Fuson						
Leebo							Tom Kane						
Prince Xizor							Nick Tate						
Yoda^{F}		Peter McConnell								Tony Pope			
Jabba the Hutt^{F}													Clint Bajakian
Darth Maul^{F}													Gregg Berger
Battle droids^{F}													Gregg Berger
Jar Jar Binks^{F}													Ahmed Best
Qui-Gon Jinn^{F}													James Warwick
Obi-Wan Kenobi^{F}													Scott Cleverdon
Nute Gunray^{F}													Scott Cleverdon
Padmé Amidala^{F}													Grey DeLisle
Captain Panaka^{F}													Jeff Coopwood
Palpatine/Darth Sidious^{F}										Nick Jameson		Nick Jameson	Nick Jameson
Watto^{F}													Andy Secombe
C-3PO^{F}^{TV}	Tony Pope									Tony Pope			Tom Kane
Shmi Skywalker^{F}													Carolyn Seymour
Boss Nass^{F}													Greg Burson
TC-14^{F}													Carolyn Seymour
Lando Calrissian^{F}												Dave Fennoy	
General Dodonna^{F}	Denny Delk	Clive Revill											
Admiral Ackbar^{F}		Erik Bauersfeld										Terry McGovern	
Grand Moff Tarkin^{F}		Nick Jameson											
General Rieekan^{F}											Neil Ross		
Admiral Zaarin				Denny Delk								Denny Delk	
Garreth Holtz												Charles Martinet	
Admiral Nammo												Neil Ross	
Admiral Yamarus												Jarion Monroe	
Aeron Azzameen												Julianne Buescher	
Antan Azzameen												Michael Sorich	
Galin Azzameen												Cam Clarke	
Borsk Fey'la^{EU}												Michael Sorich	
Olin Garn												Steve Blum	
Kupalo												David Jeremiah	
Dash Rendar^{EU}												John Cygan	
Nien Nunb^{F}												Tom Kane	
Zaletta												Andre Ware	
Dunari												Dave Fennoy	
Tomaas Azzameen												Philip Proctor	
Emon Azzameen												Nick Jameson	
Rookie One	Nick Jameson					Jamison Jones							
Turland Hack	Bill Farmer												
Thurlow Harris	Bill Farmer												
Jake Farrell^{F}	Denny Delk												
Merrick Simms	Denny Delk												
Ru Murleen	Ru Murleen					Julie Eccles							
Admiral Sarn						Gary Martinez							
Captain Merrick						Roy Conrad							
Ensign Till						Michael Aron							
Commander Jenn						Zachary Barton							
Commander Kirby						Chopper Bernet							
Ina Rece						Nicole Galland							
Kasan Moor											Olivia Hussey		
Kohl Seerdon											Neil Ross		
Dak Ralter^{F}											Raphael Sbarge		
Crix Madine^{F}											Terence McGovern		
Wes Janson^{F}											Terence McGovern		
Arden Lyn									Edie Mirman				
Jodo Kast									Neil Ross				

== 2000–2003 ==
Character	Force Commander	Demolition	Episode I: Racer	Racer Arcade	Episode I: Jedi Power Battles	Episode I: Battle for Naboo	Super Bombad Racing	Obi-Wan	Starfighter	Rogue S. II - Rogue Leader	Galactic Battlegrounds^{DLC}	Racer Revenge	Jedi Starfighter	Bounty Hunter	The Clone Wars	JK. II: Jedi Outcast	Rogue S. III - Rebel Strike	JK.: Jedi Academy
Character	2000						2001				2001, 2002^{DLC}	2002					2003	
Clone troopers,^{F}^{TV} Jango Fett,^{F} Boba Fett^{F}		Tom Kane									Tom Kane, Jeff Bennett^{DLC}		Jeff Bennett	Temuera Morrison	André Sogliuzzo		Chris Cox	Tom Kane
Darth Vader/Anakin Skywalker^{F}^{TV}	Scott Lawrence		Jake Lloyd	Jake Lloyd	Jake Lloyd		Jake Lloyd, Scott Lawrence	Matt Levin		Scott Lawrence	Scott Lawrence, Jake Lloyd, Terrence Carson,^{DLC} Matt Levin^{DLC}	Jake Lloyd, Scott Lawrence			Mat Lucas			
Luke Skywalker^{F}	Bob Bergen									Bob Bergen	Bob Bergen					Bob Bergen	Bob Bergen	Bob Bergen
Battle droids^{F}^{TV}		Clint Bajakian			Jess Harnell, Tom Kane	Matt Walters	Tom Kane	Gregg Berger							Corey Burton			
Kyle Kartarn																Jeff Bennett		Jeff Bennett
Obi-Wan Kenobi^{F}^{TV}					Scott Cleverdon		Lewis MacLeod	Lewis MacLeod		David Davies	David Davies				Jonathan Love			
Palpatine/Darth Sidious^{F}^{TV}											Nick Jameson			Nick Jameson				
Mon Mothma^{F}																Carolyn Seymour		
Leia Organa^{F}	Grey DeLisle	Clint Bajakian									Lisa Fuson							
Han Solo^{F}	Neil Ross										David Esch							
Lando Calrissian^{F}		Kevin Michael Richardson								Obba Babatundé	Obba Babatundé					Billy Dee William	Obba Babatundé	
Count Dooku^{F}^{TV}											Corey Burton^{DLC}		Jeff Bennett	Corey Burton	Corey Burton			
Yoda^{F}^{TV}					Tom Kane		Tom Kane				Tom Kane		Tom Kane		Tom Kane			
Mace Windu^{F}^{TV}					Kevin Michael Richardson			Kevin Michael Richardson					Kevin Michael Richardson					
Jan Ors																Vanessa Marshall		
Morgan Katarn																Jacob Witkin		
Tavilion																Kath Soucie		Kath Soucie
Desann																Mark Klastorin		
Jaden Korr																		Philip Tanzini, (Note: male version) Jennifer Hale (Note: female version)
Padmé Amidala^{F}^{TV}					Grey DeLisle		Grey DeLisle				Grey DeLisle				Grey DeLisle			
Wedge Antilles^{F}	Robert Foster									Denis Lawson							Chris Cox	Chris Cox
Rosh Penin																		Jason Marsden
Alora																		Grey DeLisle
Dasariah and Vil Kothos																		Peter Lurie
Marka Ragnos																		Peter Lurie
Jabba the Hutt^{F}		Clint Bajakian									Clint Bajakian^{DLC}	Clint Bajakian		Clint Bajakian				
Zam Wesel^{F}											Diane Michelle^{DLC}			Leeanna Walsman				
Admiral Ackbar^{F}										Peter McConnell							Chris Cox	
C-3PO^{F}^{TV}											Tom Kane		Ross King					
Aurra Sing^{F}		Tasia Valenza									Tasia Valenza							
Boss Nass^{F}					Greg Burson						Kevin Michael Richardson							
Captain Tarpals^{F}											Rob Paulsen							
Captain Panaka^{F}						Jeff Coopwood	Jeff Coopwood	Jeff Coopwood			Jeff Coopwood							
Darth Maul^{F}		Jess Harnell			Gregg Berger		Clint Bajakian				Jess Harnell	Jess Harnell						
General Veers^{F}	Guy Siner										Guy Siner							
Jar Jar Binks^{F}					Ahmed Best		Ahmed Best				Ahmed Best							
Qui-Gon Jinn^{F}					James Warwick			James Warwick			James Warwick							
Nute Gunray^{F}											Phil Proctor							
Depa Billaba^{F}								Amanda Moody			Diane Michelle^{DLC}							
Adi Gallia^{F}^{TV}					Nancy Giles			Masasa					Masasa Moyo					
Ki-Adi-Mundi^{F}^{TV}					Jess Harnell			Jess Harnell										
Plo Koon^{F}^{TV}					Gregg Berger			Gregg Berger										
Saesee Tiin^{F}^{TV}								Joe Paulino										
Eeth Koth^{F}^{TV}								Kevin Michael Richardson										
Rhys Dallows									Darren Scott				Darren Scott					
Nym									Charles Rocket				Charles Rocket					
Vana Sage									Lisa Fuson				Lisa Fuson					
Essara Till									Bernadette Sullivan									
Guk Yorba													Andrew Chaikin					
Narrators						Jeff Coopwood				Denny Delk								
Watto^{F}			Andy Secombe	Andy Secombe								Andy Secombe						
Biggs Darklighter^{F}										Tom Kenny								
Crix Madine^{F}										Tom Kane								
General Rieekan^{F}										Dan Barton							Dan Barton	
Karie Neth^{F}										Grey DeLisle								
"Hobbie" Klivian^{F}																	Andrew Chaikin	
Windy Starkiller^{EU} (Note: Character first appeared in a deleted scene of the 1977 film and its novelization.)																	Andrew Chaikin	
Chancellor Valorum^{F}							Tom Kane											
Boss Nass^{F}							Kevin Michael Richardson											
Brenn Tantor	Jeff Bennett																	
Grand General Malcor Brashin	David Warner																	
Dellis Tantor	Raphael Sbarge																	
General Tyr Taskeen	Michael Bell																	
Captain Beri Tulon	Peter Firth																	
Bib Fortuna^{F}		Tom Kane																
Lobot^{F}		Tom Kane																
General Otto		Tom Kane																
Wade Vox		Holt McCallany																
Malakili^{F}		Jess Harnell																
Ghia, Tia		Grey DeLisle																
Pugwis		Kevin Michael Richardson																

== 2004–2009 ==
Character	Battlefront	Episode III – RotS. game	Battlefront II	Republic Commando	Empire at War^{DLC}	Lethal Alliance	Battlefront: Renegade Squadron	The Force Unleashed	TCW. – Lightsaber Duels	TCW. – Jedi Alliance	TCW. – Republic Heroes	Battlefront: Elite Squadron
Character	2004	2005			2006, 2006^{DLC}	2006	2007	2008			2009	
Rex,^{TV} Cody,^{F}^{TV} Delta Squad, other clone troopers,^{F}^{TV} Jango Fett,^{F} Boba Fett^{F}	Temuera Morrison	Andrew Chaikin	Temuera Morrison	Temuera Morrison, Andrew Chaikin, Jonathan Cook, Raphael Sbarge, David W. Collins, Roger Jackson	Temuera Morrison	David Lodge	Andrew Chaikin	Dee Bradley Baker			Dee Bradley Baker	
Darth Vader/Anakin Skywalker^{F}^{TV}		Mat Lucas, Scott Lawrence	Mat Lucas, Scott Lawrence		Scott Lawrence, Matt Sloan^{DLC}	Fred Tatasciore		Matt Sloan	Matt Lanter	Matt Lanter	Matt Lanter, Mat Lucas	
Battle droids,^{F}^{TV} General Grievous^{F}^{TV}		Matthew Wood, Corey Burton, Andrew Chaikin, David W. Collins, Jarion Monroe	Matthew Wood, David W. Collins	Clint Young			David W. Collins		Matthew Wood	Matthew Wood	Matthew Wood	
Palpatine/Darth Sidious^{F}^{TV}	Nick Jameson	Nick Jameson	Nick Jameson		Nick Jameson			Sam Witwer	Ian Abercrombie	Ian Abercrombie	Ian Abercrombie	Sam Witwer
Obi-Wan Kenobi^{F}^{TV}		James Arnold Taylor, Nick Jameson	James Arnold Taylor, Steve Stanton		Stephen Stanton			Rob Rackstraw	James Arnold Taylor	James Arnold Taylor	James Arnold Taylor	James Arnold Taylor
Ahsoka Tano^{TV}									Ashley Eckstein	Ashley Eckstein	Ashley Eckstein	
Yoda^{F}^{TV}	Tom Kane	Tom Kane	Tom Kane	Tom Kane					Tom Kane	Tom Kane	Tom Kane	
Luke Skywalker^{F}			Bob Bergen		Lloyd Floyd^{DLC}			Lloyd Floyd				
Count Dooku^{F}^{TV}			Corey Burton						Corey Burton	Corey Burton	Corey Burton	
Galen Merec								Sam Witwer				
Leia Organa^{F}^{TV}			Joyce Kurtz			Joyce Kurtz		Catherine Taber				
Cad Bane^{TV}											Corey Burton	
Asajj Ventress^{TV}							Montego Glover		Nika Futterman	Nika Futterman	Nika Futterman	
Juno Eclipse								Nathalie Cox				
Kyle Katarn						David Lodge						
Rahm Kota								Cully Fredricksen				Cully Fredricksen
Maris Brood								Adrienne Wilkinson				
PROXY								David W. Collins				
Bail Organa^{F}^{TV}								Jimmy Smits				
Jabba the Hutt^{F}^{TV}								David W. Collins				
Kento Marek								Tom Kane				
Ozzik Sturn								Tom Kane				
Kazdan Paratus								Larry Drake				
Shaak Ti^{F}^{TV}								Susan Eisenberg				
Han Solo^{F}			Lex Lang		John Armstrong		John Armstrong					
Darth Maul^{F}^{TV}			Steve Stanton									
Aayla Secura^{F}^{TV}			Rachel Reenstra									
Mace Windu^{F}^{TV}		Terrence C. Carson	Terrence C. Carson						Terrence C. Carson	Terrence C. Carson		Terrence C. Carson
General Veers^{F}			Jamie Glover		Jamie Glover^{DLC}							
Kyle Katarn					Brian Bascle							
Mon Mothma^{F}					Carolyn Seymour							
Admiral Ackbar^{F}	Tom Kane				Edmund Dehn^{DLC}		Daniel Riordan					
Mara Jade^{EU}					Kath Soucie							
Tarkin^{F}					Paul Darrow							
Piett^{F}					Rupert Degas^{DLC}							
Captain Antilles^{F}					Stephen Stanton^{DLC}							
C-3PO^{F}^{TV}					Tom Kane				Anthony Daniels	Anthony Daniels		
Grand Admiral Thrawn^{EU}					Robin Atkin Downes^{DLC}							
Narrators					Denny Delk		Gideon Emery		Tom Kane	Tom Kane	Tom Kane	
Padmé Amidala^{F}^{TV}										Catherine Taber		
Plo Koon^{F}^{TV}									James Arnold Taylor	James Arnold Taylor		
Kit Fisto^{F}^{TV}									Phil LaMarr	Phil LaMarr		
Luminara Unduli^{F}^{TV}										Olivia D'Abo		
Sai Sircu										Lorri Holt		
Yansu Grjak										Grey DeLisle		
Ros Lai^{EU}										Grey DeLisle		
Tionne							Montego Glover					
IG-88^{F}							David W. Collins					
Col Serra							Gideon Emery					Gideon Emery
Serra Keto		Kari Wahlgren										
Cin Drallig		Tom Kane										
Jocasta Nu^{F}		Alethea McGrath										
Taun We^{F}				Rena Owen								
Zarien Kheev						Steve Blum						
Slak Sagar						David Lodge						

== Star Wars: Knights of the Old Republic ==
Character	Knights of the Old Republic	Knights of the Old Republic II: The Sith Lords	The Old Republic^{DLC}						
Character	Knights of the Old Republic	Knights of the Old Republic II: The Sith Lords	Main game	TOR: Rise of the Hutt Cartel^{DLC}	TOR.: Galactic Starfighter^{DLC}	TOR.: Galactic Strongholds^{DLC}	TOR.: Shadow of Revan^{DLC}	TOR.: Knights of the Fallen Empire^{DLC}	TOR.: Knights of the Eternal Throne^{DLC}
Character	2003	2004	2011	2013^{DLC}	2014^{DLC}			2015^{DLC}	2022^{DLC}
Bastilla Shan	Jennifer Hale		Jennifer Hale						
Carth Onasi	Raphael Sbarge	Raphael Sbarge							
Darth Malak	Rafael Ferrer	Rafael Ferrer							
Canderous Ordo	John Cygan								
HK-47, HK-50	Kristoffer Tabori	Kristoffer Tabori	Kristoffer Tabori						
Jolee Bindo	Kevin Michael Richardson								
Juhani	Courtenay Taylor								
Kreia		Sara Kestelman							
Darth Sion		Louis Mellis							
Visas Marr		Kelly Hu							
Vrook Lamar	Ed Asner	Ed Asner							
Player characters			Tom Spackman, Grey DeLisle, Bertie Carvel, Jo Wyatt, David Hayter, Kari Wahlgren, Nolan North, Athena Karkanis, Euan Morton, Xanthe Elbrick, Mark Bazeley, Natasha Little, Maury Sterling, Kath Soucie, Brian Bloom, Jennifer Hale						
Satele Shan			Jennifer Hale						
The Sith Emperor Valkorion			Doug Bradley						
Revan			Jeff Bennett						
Darth Malgus			Jamie Glover						
Darth Jadus			Stephen Rashbrook						
Darth Baras			Jim McCance						
Akaavi Spar			Stacy Haiduk						
Andronikos Revel			Steve Blum						
Baron Deathmark			Steve Blum						
Aric Jorgan			Timothy Omundson						
Ashara Zavros			Azura Skye						
Corso Riggs			Troy Hall						
Archiban Frodrick Kimble "Doc"			Andrew Bowen						
Doctor Lokin			Anthony Cochrane						
Ensign Raina Temple			Georgia Van Cuylenburg						
Felix Iresso			Dion Graham						
Gault Rennow			Daran Norris						
Languss Tuno			Gary Schwartz						
Jaesa Willsaam			Rachael Leigh Cook						
Kaliyo Djannis			Tasia Valenza						
Kira Carsen			Laura Bailey						
Lieutenant Pierce			Adam Leadbeater						
Lord Scourge			Joseph Gatt						
Lord Zash			Jen Cohn						
Lt. Talos Drellik			Edward Hibbert						
M1-4X			Tom Kane						
Dol Narlock			Tom Kane						

== 2010s ==
Character	Clone Wars Adventures	The Force Unleashed II	Battlefront (2015)	LEGO SW.: The Force Awakens	Battlefront II (2017)^{DLC}	Jedi Fallen Order	Vader Immortal (Note: Was released as three separate episodes)
Character	2010		2015	2016	2017, 2017,^{DLC} 2019^{DLC}	2019	
Captain Rex,^{TV} other clone troopers,^{F}^{TV} Boba Fett^{F}^{TV}	Dee Bradley Baker	Dee Bradley Baker	Temuera Morrison		Dee Bradley Baker	Dee Bradley Baker	
Anakin Skywalker/Darth Vader^{F}^{TV}		Matt Sloan	Matt Sloan	Matt Sloan	Matt Sloan, Matt Lanter^{DLC}	Scott Lawrence	Scott Lawrence
Galen Merec, his clones		Sam Witwer					
Cal Kestis						Cameron Monaghan^{MC}	
Second Sister/Trilla Suduri^{EU}						Elizabeth Grullón	
Palpatine/Darth Sidious^{F}^{TV}			Sam Witwer	Sam Witwer	Sam Witwer		
Juno Eclipse		Nathalie Cox					
General Grievous, Battle Droids	Matthew Wood				Matthew Wood, Matthew Wood^{DLC}		
Yoda^{F}^{TV}		Tom Kane			Tom Kane		
Obi-Wan Kenobi^{F}^{TV}					James Arnold Taylor^{DLC}		
Iden Versio					Janina Gavankar		
Del Meeko					TJ Ramini		
Gideon Hask					Paul Blackthorne		
Greez Dritus						Daniel Roebuck	
Cere Junda						Debra Wilson	
Ninth Sister^{EU}						Misty Lee	
Leia Organa^{F}^{TV}		Catherine Taber	Misty Lee	Carrie Fisher	Misty Lee, Rachel Butera^{DLC}		
Han Solo^{F}^{TV}			John Armstrong	Harrison Ford	John Armstrong		
Luke Skywalker^{F}^{TV}			Anthony Hansen	Mark Hamill	Matthew Mercer		
Rey^{F}^{TV}				Daisy Ridley	Helen Sadler,Daisy Ridley		
Kylo Ren^{F}				Adam Driver	Matthew Wood, Roger Craig Smith		
Poe Dameron^{F}^{TV}				Oscar Isaac	Lex Lang		
Maz Kanata^{F}^{TV}				Lupita Nyong'o	Grey Griffin		
Lando Calrissian^{F}^{TV}			Billy Dee Williams	Billy Dee Williams	Billy Dee Williams		
Finn^{F}^{TV}				John Boyega	John Boyega^{DLC}		
Saw Gerrera^{TV}^{F}						Forest Whitaker	
Prauf						JB Blanc	
Merrin						Tina Ivlev	
Taron Malicos						Liam McIntyre	
Eno Cordova						Tony Amendola	
Jaro Tapal						Travis Willingham	
Rahm Kota		Cully Fredricksen					
PROXY		David W. Collins					
Merillion Tarko		Dee Bradley Baker					
Mari Kosan						Sumalee Montano	
Sorc Tormo						Luke Cook	
Garrick Versio					Anthony Skordi		
Zay Versio					Brittany Volcy^{DLC}		
Admiral Ackbar^{F}^{TV}			Tom Kane	Tom Kane	Tom Kane		
Wedge Antilles^{F}^{TV}				Nathan Kress			
Shriv Suurgav					Dan Donohue		
ZO-E3							Maya Rudolph
Gable Karius							Steve Blum
Vylip F'alma							Keith Ferguson
Dorwin Corvax							David Sobolov
Wannek							Nika Futterman
Lady Corvax							Laura Post
C-3PO^{F}^{TV}			Anthony Daniels	Anthony Daniels			
Captain Phasma^{F}^{TV}				Gwendoline Christie	Gwendoline Christie^{DLC}		
General Hux^{F}^{TV}				Domhnall Gleeson			
Jar Jar Binks^{F}^{TV}	Ahmed Best						
Snap Wexley^{F}				Greg Grunberg			
Unkar Plutt^{F}				Simon Pegg			
Nien Nunb^{F}				Bill Kipsang Rotich			
Tasu Leech^{F}				Yayan Ruhian			
Supreme Leader Snoke^{F}				Andy Serkis			
C'ai Threnalli^{F}				Christian Simpson			
Lor San Tekka^{F}				Max von Sydow			
Dengar^{F}^{TV}			Simon Pegg				
Bossk^{F}^{TV}			Dee Bradley Baker		Dee Bradley Baker		
K-2SO^{F}			Alan Tudyk				
Jyn Erso^{F}^{TV}			Helen Sadler				
Count Dooku^{F}^{TV}					Corey Burton^{DLC}		
Darth Maul^{F}^{TV}					Sam Witwer		
Ralsius Paldora					Oliver Vaquer		

== 2020s ==
Character	Tales from the Galaxy's Edge	Squadrons	LEGO SW.: The Skywalker Saga	Jedi Survivor
Character	2020		2022	2023
Commander Cody,^{F}^{TV} other clone troopers,^{F}^{TV} Jango Fett,^{F}^{TV} Boba Fett^{F}^{TV}			Dee Bradley Baker, Daniel Logan, Claire Morgan	Temuera Morrison
Anakin Skywalker/Darth Vader^{F}^{TV}			Matt Lanter, Fred Tatasciore, Claire Morgan	Scott Lawrence
Cal Kestis				Cameron Monaghan,^{MC} Zach Dulin
Cere Junda				Debra Wilson
Greez Dritus				Daniel Roebuck
Merrin				Tina Ivlev
Bode Akuna				Noshir Dalal
Wedge Antilles^{F}^{TV}		Denis Lawson		
Hera Syndulla^{TV}		Vanessa Marshall		
Terisa Kerrill		Peta Sergeant		
Lindon Javes		Phil Morris		
Ardo Barodai		Keythe Farley		
Rae Sloane^{EU}		Dionne Audain		
Varko Grey		Noshir Dalal		
Havina Vonreg		Helen Sadler		
Dagan Gera				Cody Fern
Santari Khri				Tracy Ifeachor
Rayvis				DC Douglas
Ninth Sister^{EU}				Misty Lee
Eno Cordova				Tony Amendola
Keo Venzee		Bex Taylor-Klaus		
Feresk 'Frisk' Tssat		James Arnold Taylor		
Kierah 'Gunny' Koovah		Rebecca Wisocky		
Rella Sol		Sofia Pernas		
Gralm		Robin Atkin Downes		
ZN-A4				Kendal Rae
Doma Dendra				Rebecca Wisocky
Kata Akuna				Tajinae Turner
Gabs				Britt Baron
Caij Vanda				Verona Blue
Mosey Cimarron				Elizabeth Frances
Bravo				Russel Richardson
Ashe Javi				Andi Christensen
Commander Lank Denvik				Gideon Emery
Daho Sejan				TJ Ramini
Yoda^{F}^{TV}	Frank Oz		Tom Kane	
C-3PO^{F}^{TV}	Anthony Daniels		Anthony Daniels	
Seezelslak	Bobby Moynihan			
Mubo	Matthew Wood			
Tara Rashin	Debra Wilson			
Ady Sun'Zee	Ellie Araiza			
Master Sylwin	Vanessa Marshall			
Boss Nass^{F}			Brian Blessed	
Count Dooku^{F}^{TV}			Corey Burton	
Ki-Adi-Mundi^{F}^{TV}			Silas Carson	
Nute Gunray^{F}^{TV}			Silas Carson	
Mace Windu^{F}^{TV}			Terrence C. Carson	
Poe Dameron^{F}^{TV}			Josh Cowdery	
Jocasta Nu^{F}^{TV}			Flo Di Re	
Edrison Peavey^{F}			Adrian Edmondson	
Maz Kanata^{F}^{TV}			Grey Griffin	
Temmin Wexley^{EU}^{F}			Greg Grunberg	
Leia Organa^{F}^{TV}			Carolyn Hennesy, Shelby Young	
Jessika Pava^{F}			Jessica Henwick	
Admiral Ackbar^{F}^{TV}			Tom Kane	
Qui-Gon Jinn^{F}^{TV}			Tom Kane	
Finn^{F}^{TV}			Arif S. Kinchen	
Captain Typho^{F}			Jay Laga'aia	
Ric Olié^{F}			Ralph Brown	
Jar Jar Binks^{F}^{TV}			Phil LaMarr	
Bail Organa^{F}^{TV}			Phil LaMarr	
Kit Fisto^{F}^{TV}			Phil LaMarr	
Han Solo^{F}^{TV}			A.J. LoCascio	
Luke Skywalker^{F}^{TV}			David Menkin, Nathan Osgood	
Lama Su^{F}^{TV}			Anthony Phelan	
Jabba the Hutt^{F}^{TV}			Kevin Michael Richardson	
General Rieekan^{F}			William Roberts	
Nien Nunb^{F}			Kipsang Rotich	
Rey^{F}^{TV}			Helen Sadler	
Watto^{F}			Andrew Secombe	
4-LOM^{F}			Kerry Shale	
Yarael Poof^{F}			Kerry Shale	
Captain Tarpals^{F}^{TV}			Steven Speirs	
Obi-Wan Kenobi^{F}^{TV}			James Arnold Taylor, Stephen Stanton	
Padmé Amidala^{F}^{TV}			Catherine Taber	
Zam Wesell^{F}			Leeanna Walsman	
Lando Calrissian^{F}^{TV}			Billy Dee Williams	
Palpatine/Darth Sidious^{F}^{TV}			Sam Witwer	
Darth Maul^{F}^{TV}			Sam Witwer	
General Grievous, battle droids^{F}^{TV}			Matthew Wood	Matthew Wood
Kylo Ren^{F}			Matthew Wood	
Yaddle^{F}^{TV}			Emma Stannard	
Captain Antilles^{F}			Tim Beckmann	
Unkar Plutt^{F}			Dee Bradley Baker	

== See also ==
- List of Star Wars video games
- List of Star Wars film actors
- List of Star Wars television series actors
- List of Star Wars characters
  - List of Star Wars Legends characters
