= Lists of Star Wars actors =

Lists of Star Wars cast members cover cast members of productions by Star Wars, a media franchise centered on a series of science fiction films. The lists include cast members of feature films, television series video games and television films.

== Feature films ==
- List of Star Wars film actors, cast and characters that have appeared in Star Wars films

== Television series ==
- List of Star Wars television series actors, cast and characters that have appeared in Star Wars television series
  - Star Wars: Droids § Cast and characters, cast and characters that have appeared on the Droids television series
  - Ewoks (TV series) § Cast and characters, cast and characters that have appeared on the Ewoks television series
  - Star Wars: Clone Wars (2003 TV series) § Voice cast, cast and characters that have appeared on Clone Wars television series
  - Star Wars: The Clone Wars (2008 TV series) § Cast and characters, cast and characters that have appeared on The Clone Wars television series
  - Star Wars Rebels § Cast and characters, cast and characters that have appeared on Rebels television series
  - Star Wars Forces of Destiny § Cast and characters, cast and characters that have appeared on the Forces of Destiny television series
  - Star Wars Resistance § Cast and characters, cast and characters that have appeared on the Resistance television series
  - List of The Mandalorian characters, cast and characters that have appeared on The Mandalorian television series
  - Star Wars: The Bad Batch § Cast and characters, cast and characters that have appeared on The Bad Batch television series
  - Star Wars: Tales of the Jedi § Cast and characters, cast and characters that have appeared on Tales of the Jedi television series
  - List of The Book of Boba Fett characters, cast and characters that have appeared on The Book of Boba Fett television series
  - Obi-Wan Kenobi (TV series) § Cast and characters, cast and characters that have appeared on the Obi-Wan Kenobi television series
  - Andor (TV series) § Cast and characters, cast and characters that have appeared on the Andor television series
  - Ahsoka (TV series) § Cast and characters, cast and characters that have appeared on the Ahsoka television series

== Video games ==
- List of Star Wars video game actors

== Television films ==
- Star Wars Holiday Special § Cast, cast and characters that have appeared on the Star Wars Holiday Special television film
- Caravan of Courage: An Ewok Adventure § Cast, cast and characters that have appeared on the Caravan of Courage: An Ewok Adventure television film
- Ewoks: The Battle for Endor § Cast, cast and characters that have appeared on the Ewoks: The Battle for Endor television film

== See also ==
- List of Star Wars characters
- List of Star Wars Legends characters
