= Vanity Fair (1998 TV serial) =

- Based on: Vanity Fair by William Makepeace Thackeray
- Screenplay by: Andrew Davies
- Directed by: Marc Munden
- Starring: Natasha Little; Frances Grey; Philip Glenister; Tom Ward
- Country of origin: United Kingdom
- Original language: English
- No. of episodes: 6

Production
- Producer: Gillian Mcneill
- Cinematography: Oliver Curtis
- Running time: 300 min (total)

Original release
- Network: BBC One
- Release: 1 November – 6 December 1998

Vanity Fair is a BBC television drama serial adaptation of William Makepeace Thackeray's 1848 novel of the same name broadcast in 1998. The screenplay was written by Andrew Davies.

The BBC had adapted the novel as a serial three times previously, in 1956, in 1967 and in 1987.

== Plot summary ==
For a full-length summary of the book see: Vanity Fair plot summary.

== Cast ==
- Natasha Little as Becky Sharp
- Frances Grey as Amelia Sedley
- David Ross as Mr Sedley
- Philip Glenister as William Dobbin
- Michele Dotrice as Mrs Sedley
- Janine Duvitski as Mrs Bute Crawley
- Anton Lesser as Mr Pitt Crawley
- Nathaniel Parker as Rawdon Crawley
- Jeremy Swift as Jos Sedley
- Tom Ward as George Osborne
- Stephen Frost as Bute Crawley
- Tim Woodward as Mr John Osborne
- Janet Dale as Miss Briggs
- Frances Tomelty as Mrs O'Dowd
- Mark Lambert as Major O'Dowd
- David Bradley as Sir Pitt Crawley
- John Surman as Horrocks
- Miriam Margolyes as Miss Crawley
- Daniel Hart as Ensign Stubble
- Abigail Thaw as Jane Osborne
- Bryan Pringle as Raggles
- Linal Haft as Moss
- Eleanor Bron as Lady Bareacres
- Sarah Crowden as Lady Blanche
- Graham Crowden as Lord Bareacres
- Sylvestra Le Touzel as Lady Jane Crawley
- Gerard Murphy as Lord Steyne
- Robert Cole as Little Rawdon
- Zohren Weiss as Little Georgey
- Jean-Benoit Blanc as Hussar

== Awards ==
Won:

- 1999: Television and Radio Industries Club Awards - BBC Programme of the Year
- 1999: Banff Television Festival - Special Jury Prize
- 1999: Biarritz International Festival of Audiovisual Programming - Best TV Series and Serials, Best Actress (Natasha Little), Screenplay

Nominated:

- 1999: British Academy Television Awards - Best Drama Serial, Best Actress, Best Costume Design, Best Editing, Best Original Music, Best Photography
- 1999: Royal Television Society Programme Awards - Actor: Female (Natasha Little)
- 1999: Royal Television Society Craft & Design Awards - Music - Original Score (Murray Gold)
