= Another Life (2001 film) =

2001 film by Philip Goodhew

- Directed by: Philip Goodhew
- Written by: Philip Goodhew
- Produced by: Chris Craib; Lora Fox Gamble
- Starring: Natasha Little; Nick Moran; Ioan Gruffudd; Imelda Staunton
- Cinematography: Simon Archer
- Edited by: Jamie Trevill
- Music by: James McConnel
- Release date: 1 February 2001 (Singapore)
- Running time: 101 minutes
- Country: United Kingdom
- Language: English

Another Life is a 2001 British crime film written and directed by Philip Goodhew. It stars Ioan Gruffudd, Natasha Little, Nick Moran, Imelda Staunton, Rachael Stirling and Tom Wilkinson.

== Plot summary ==
Chiefly set in London during the First World War and in the early 1920s (primarily 1921 and 1922), the film concerns a daydreaming young woman, Edith Graydon (Little), who attracts, then marries, an ordinary shipping clerk, Percy Thompson (Moran), who reminds her of a character in books. Later, Edith carries on an affair with Frederick Bywaters (Gruffudd), a young merchant seaman and childhood friend of her younger brother. The Thompsons' marriage had been a failure for years when Edith became reacquainted with Bywaters, who by then was dating Avis (Stirling), Edith's younger sister. Over the course of their tempestuous affair, Edith writes to Bywaters during his extended absences at sea about her growing boredom and frustration with the dull Percy, who has grown jealous and violent at times.

The letters burst with Edith's vivid imagination, including her hopes for a romantic future with Bywaters and her alleged attempts to kill her husband through feeding him glass and poisons. Edith's fantasy-driven promises to leave Percy stir Bywaters to a frenzy; he also resents the way Percy deprecates and even injures Edith. Finally, Bywaters attacks Percy with a knife, as the couple walk home from the theatre. The resulting trial and conviction of the lovers creates a sensation across Britain, as Edith maintains her innocence of any part in her husband's murder. Her letters paint a different picture, despite Bywaters' insistence he acted alone and impulsively. Despite a massive number of signatures on a petition protesting against Edith's death sentence, the lovers hang on the same day. To the end, Edith conjures up dreams of her sentence being commuted to life imprisonment, so her captors must sedate and carry her off to the scaffold.

== Background ==
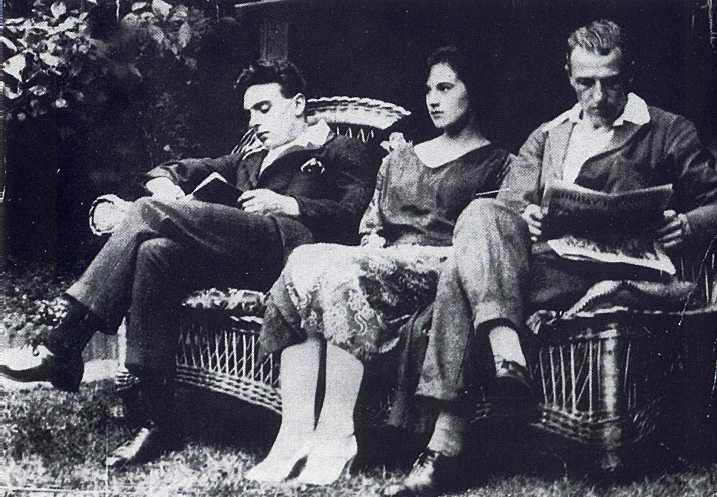
Freddy Bywaters, Edith Thompson, Percy Thompson, photographed in 1921

The plot is based on the true story of Edith Thompson and Frederick Bywaters of a prominent 1920s adultery–murder case, in which the pair of lovers were convicted of murdering Edith Thompson's husband. It was widely believed at the time that Thompson was innocent, but was nevertheless hanged for her alleged involvement in the crime. The case was especially noted as, on the day of her execution, Thompson became hysterical and had to be sedated, and she was carried by prison officers to the gallows. Rumours abounded that she was pregnant, that her internal organs fell out of her body when she was hanged, and that the experience contributed to the resignation and eventual suicide of her executioner, John Ellis.

== Cast ==
- Natasha Little as Edith Graydon (later Thompson)
- Nick Moran as Percy Thompson
- Ioan Gruffudd as Frederick Bywaters
- Imelda Staunton as Ethel Graydon
- Rachael Stirling as Avis Graydon
- Tom Wilkinson as Mr Carlton
- Diana Coupland as Mrs Lester
- Michael Bertenshaw as William Graydon
- Daniel Brocklebank as Newnie
- Elizabeth McKechnie as Mrs Thompson
- Judy Clifton as Nora Lester
- Simon Paris as Sergeant Mew
- Alex Potter as Young Billy Graydon
- Anton Gregory as Young Harold Graydon
- Rikki Doughty as Young Freddy Bywaters
- Juliet Forester as Miss Prior
- Helen Brampton as Lily Thompson
- Daniel Goode as Kenneth
- Gyuri Sarossy as Archie
- Arthur Gerard as Mr Lester
- Jack Cassidy as Older Billy Graydon
- Daniel Louw as Older Harold Graydon
- Nicholas Hutchison as Dr Maudsley
- Alan Leith as Detective Inspector Hall
- Michael Sheard as Mr Justice Shearman
- Miles Richardson as Clerk of court
- Bruce Purchase as Sir Henry Curtis-Bennett
- John Tordoff as John Ellis
- Richard Mayes as Prison chaplain
- Sean Boru as Courtroom photographer (uncredited)

== Critical reception ==
Unlike Philip Goodhew's earlier film, Intimate Relations, Another Life was relatively poorly received by critics. Writing in Variety, Derek Elley noted a strong cast but felt that the script and direction were inconsistent in quality. He considered that the picture was subject to a "stiffness" typical of the period drama genre, but sensed that Goodhew had greater ambitions, with the result that the film felt "like a much bigger picture trapped in a small frame". The Guardian critic Peter Bradshaw described it as a "spruce, neatly furnished and nicely acted true-life crime story" but also found it to be "a flesh-creeping domestic thriller with hints of grisly black comedy", and praised Kit Hesketh-Harvey's period songs.

The film review aggregation website Rotten Tomatoes indicates 43% approval rating based on over 100 reviews with an overall rating of 3/5.
