= Elizabeth McKechnie =

English actress (born 1961)

- Born: 16 March 1961 (age 64); Isle of Wight, England

Elizabeth "Liz" McKechnie (born 16 March 1961) is an English actress who has worked extensively in film and television. She is known for a wide range of leading roles in theatre, TV and film: Theatre - RSC, Royal Court, Royal Exchange Manchester and other major regional theatres. TV - major drama including The Plot Against Harold Wilson and comedy series. Feature film including Another Life, Intimate Relations, Feardotcom, Creep, Tooth, In the Cold Light of Day.

Known for several series of the Rory Bremner Show, Intimate Relations - Handmade Films, Another Life - Boxer Films.
