= Man and Boy (2002 film) =

2002 British television film

Man and Boy is a 2002 British television drama film made for the BBC and directed by Simon Curtis and starring Ioan Gruffudd, Elizabeth Mitchell and Natasha Little. It was based on the 1999 novel Man and Boy by Tony Parsons.

== Plot summary ==
After a man becomes involved in a brief affair his wife decides to leave him and he is left to bring up their young son by himself.

== Main cast ==
- Ioan Gruffudd - Harry Silver
- Elizabeth Mitchell - Cyd Mason
- Natasha Little - Gina Silver
- Ian McNeice - Nigel Batty
- Pauline Collins - Betty Silver
- Dominic Howell - Pat Silver
- Jack Shepherd - Paddy Silver
- Ian McShane - Marty McMann
