= Richard Mayes =

English actor

- Born: Derek Leonard Richard Mayes; 26 December 1922; Luton, Bedfordshire, England
- Died: 22 October 2006 (aged 83); England
- Education: Royal Central School of Speech and Drama
- Occupation: Actor
- Spouse: Beryl King (m. 1950)
- Children: 2

Derek Leonard Richard Mayes (26 December 1922 – 22 October 2006) was an English stage, film and television actor. He trained at the Central School of Speech and Drama. A well-known face on British television, he was primarily a theatrical actor, described by The Stage as "an RSC stalwart." He appeared in many roles on stage and small screen, including roles in Doctor Who and as Jedediah Dingle in Emmerdale. He suffered a stroke in 2004.

Mayes was married to the actress Beryl King, with whom he had two daughters, Susan and Penny.

== Filmography ==
| Year | Title | Role | Notes |
|---|---|---|---|
| 1982 | Gandhi | Mr. Baker | |
| 1984 | Top Secret! | Vladimir Biletnikov | |
| 1998 | Middleton's Changeling | Vermandero | |
| 2001 | Another Life | Prison chaplain | |
