= Lists of Star Wars characters =

Star Wars is an American epic space opera media franchise and shared universe originally created by George Lucas. Following the release of the eponymous film in 1977, the franchise became a worldwide phenomenon that has expanded into various films, television series, video games, novels, comic books, and theme park attractions to become one of the highest grossing media franchises of all time. The franchise spans multiple fictional eras "a long time ago in a galaxy far, far away". Events are shaped by the interactions between human, alien, and droid characters, many of whom are considered among the most iconic characters of all time.

This incomplete list of characters from the Star Wars franchise contains only those which are considered part of the official Star Wars canon, as of the changes made by Lucasfilm in April 2014. Following its acquisition by the Walt Disney Company in 2012, Lucasfilm rebranded most of the novels, comics, video games and other works as Star Wars Legends and declared them non-canon to the rest of the franchise. As such, this list contains only information from the nine Skywalker Saga films, the 2008 animated TV series Star Wars: The Clone Wars, and other media published or produced after April 2014.

== Stand-alone lists ==
- List of Star Wars original trilogy characters
- List of Star Wars prequel trilogy characters
- List of Star Wars sequel trilogy characters
- List of Star Wars Rebels characters
- List of Star Wars television series actors § Animated series
- List of The Book of Boba Fett characters
- List of The Mandalorian characters

== Other individual projects ==
- The Acolyte § Cast and characters
- Ahsoka § Cast and characters
- Andor § Cast and characters
- Obi-Wan Kenobi (miniseries) § Cast and characters
- Rogue One § Cast
- Skeleton Crew § Cast and characters
- Solo: A Star Wars Story § Cast
- Star Wars: The Bad Batch § Characters
- Star Wars: The Clone Wars § Characters
- Star Wars: Maul – Shadow Lord § Cast and characters

== Legends ==
Some characters have additional or alternate plotlines in the non-canonical Legends continuity.

- List of Star Wars: Knights of the Old Republic characters
- List of Star Wars Legends characters

== Species ==
- Lists of Star Wars species
- List of Star Wars species (A–E)
- List of Star Wars species (F–J)
- List of Star Wars species (K–O)
- List of Star Wars species (P–T)
- List of Star Wars species (U–Z)

== See also ==
- Clone trooper § Individual clone troopers
- Droid (Star Wars) § List of droid characters
- Lists of Star Wars actors
- Lists of Star Wars film actors
- Lists of Star Wars television series actors
- List of Star Wars creatures
- List of Star Wars books
