= List of Star Wars television series actors =

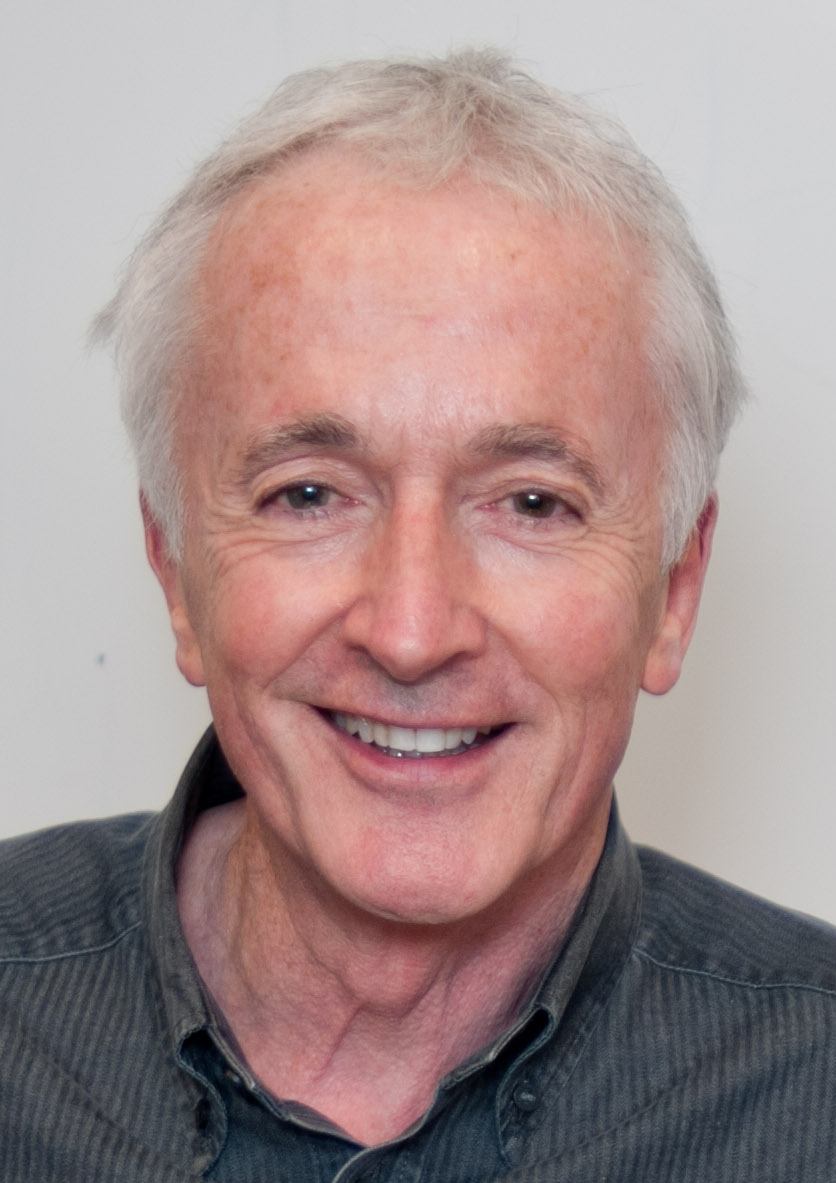
Anthony Daniels

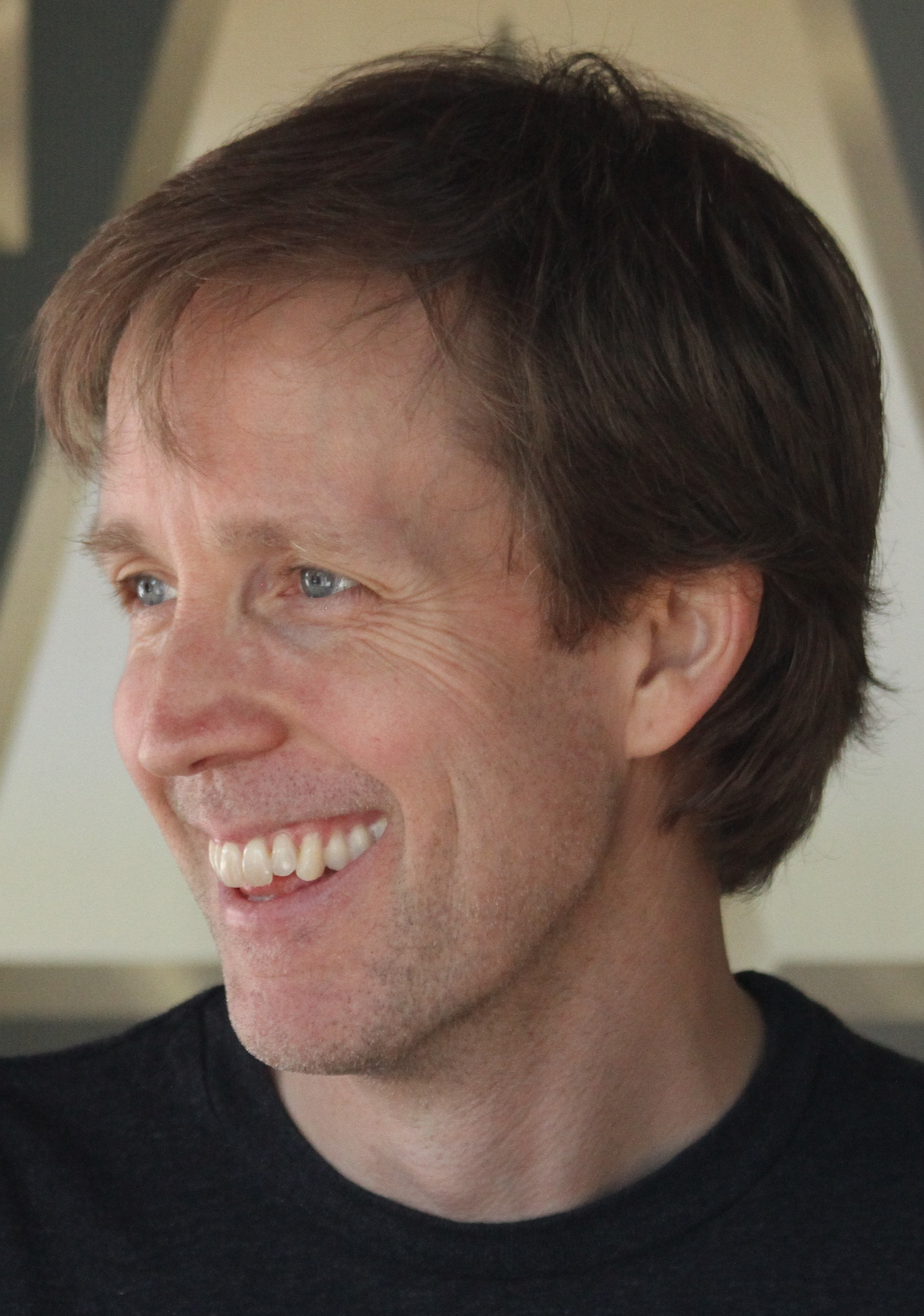
James Arnold Taylor

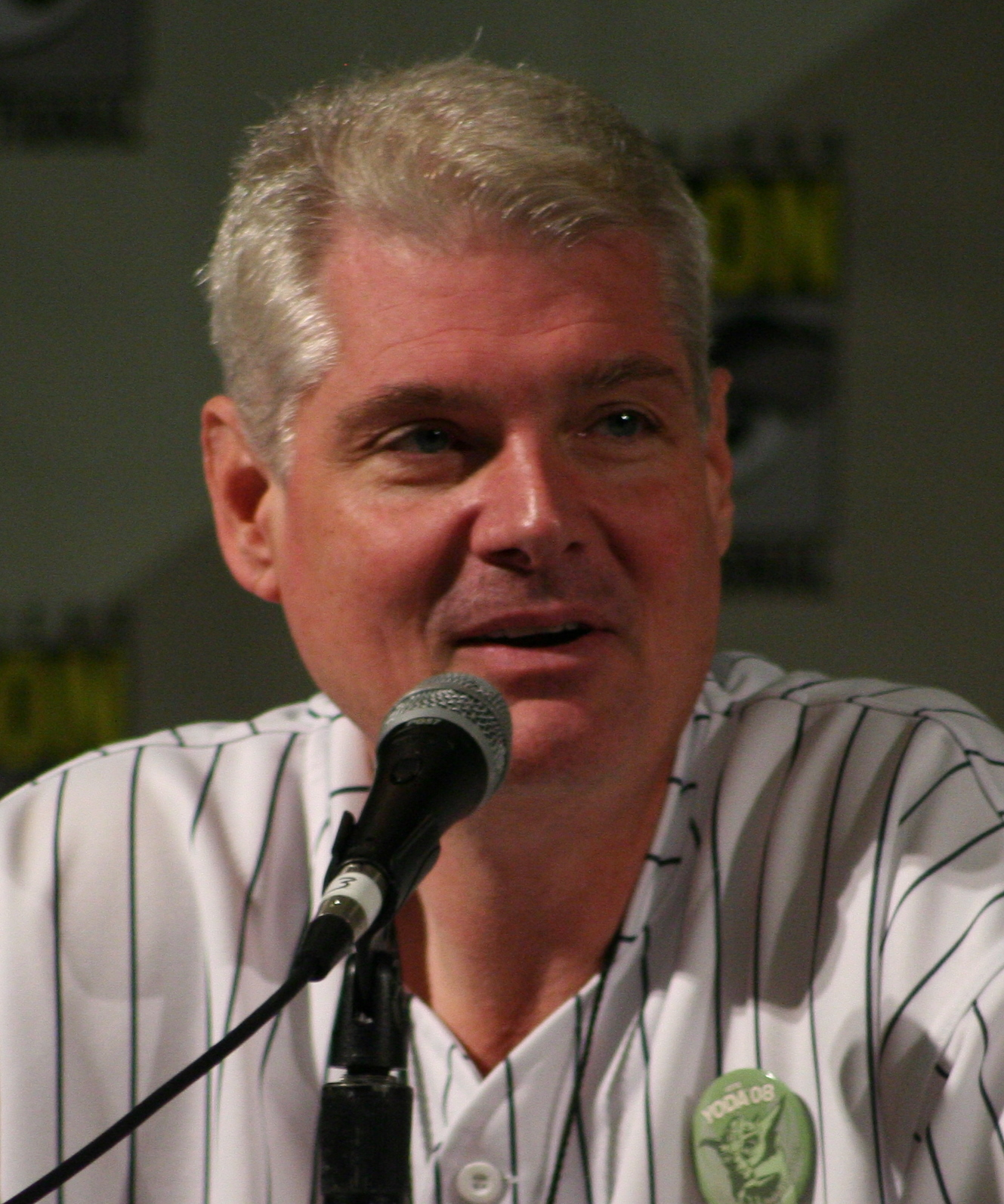
Tom Kane

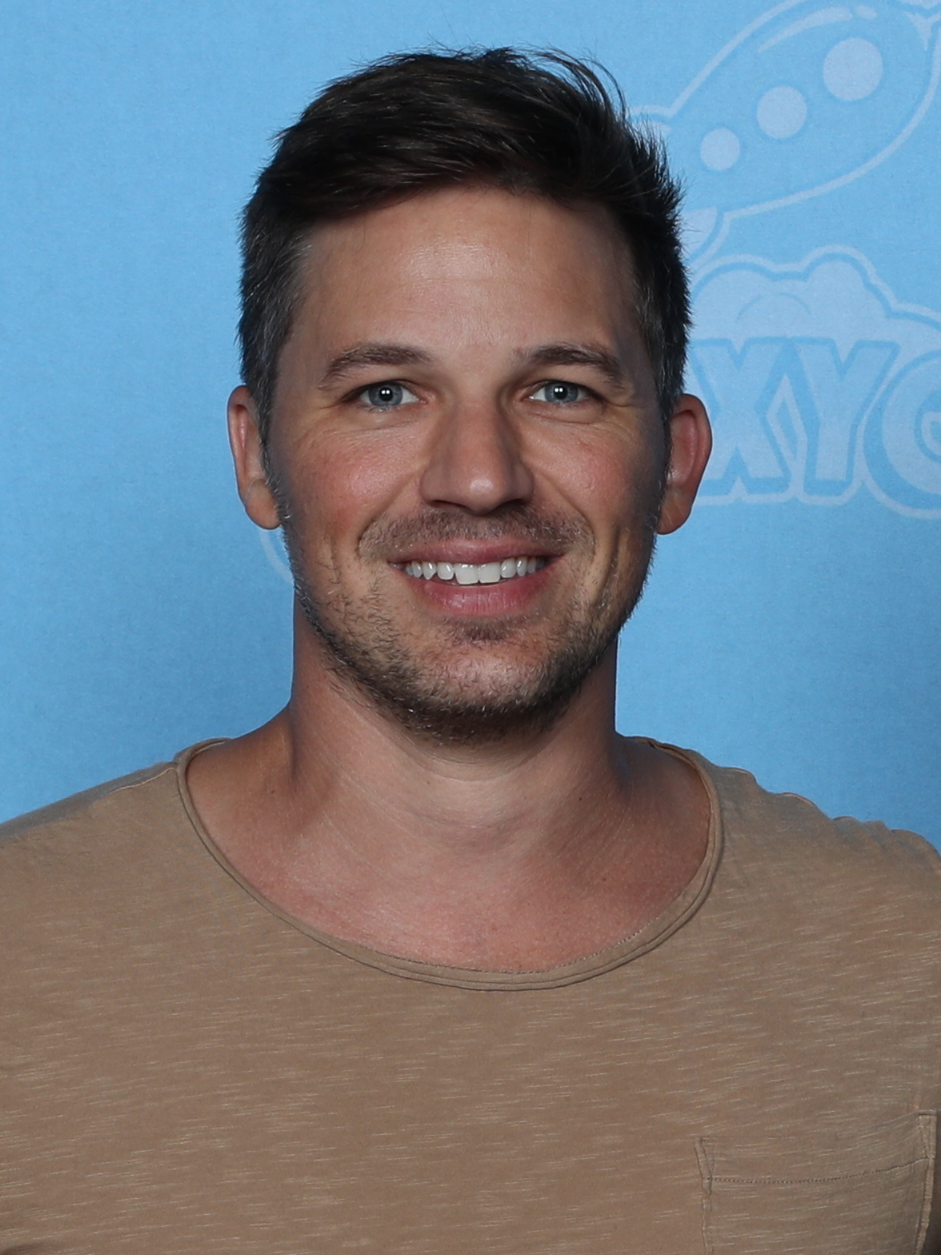
Matt Lanter

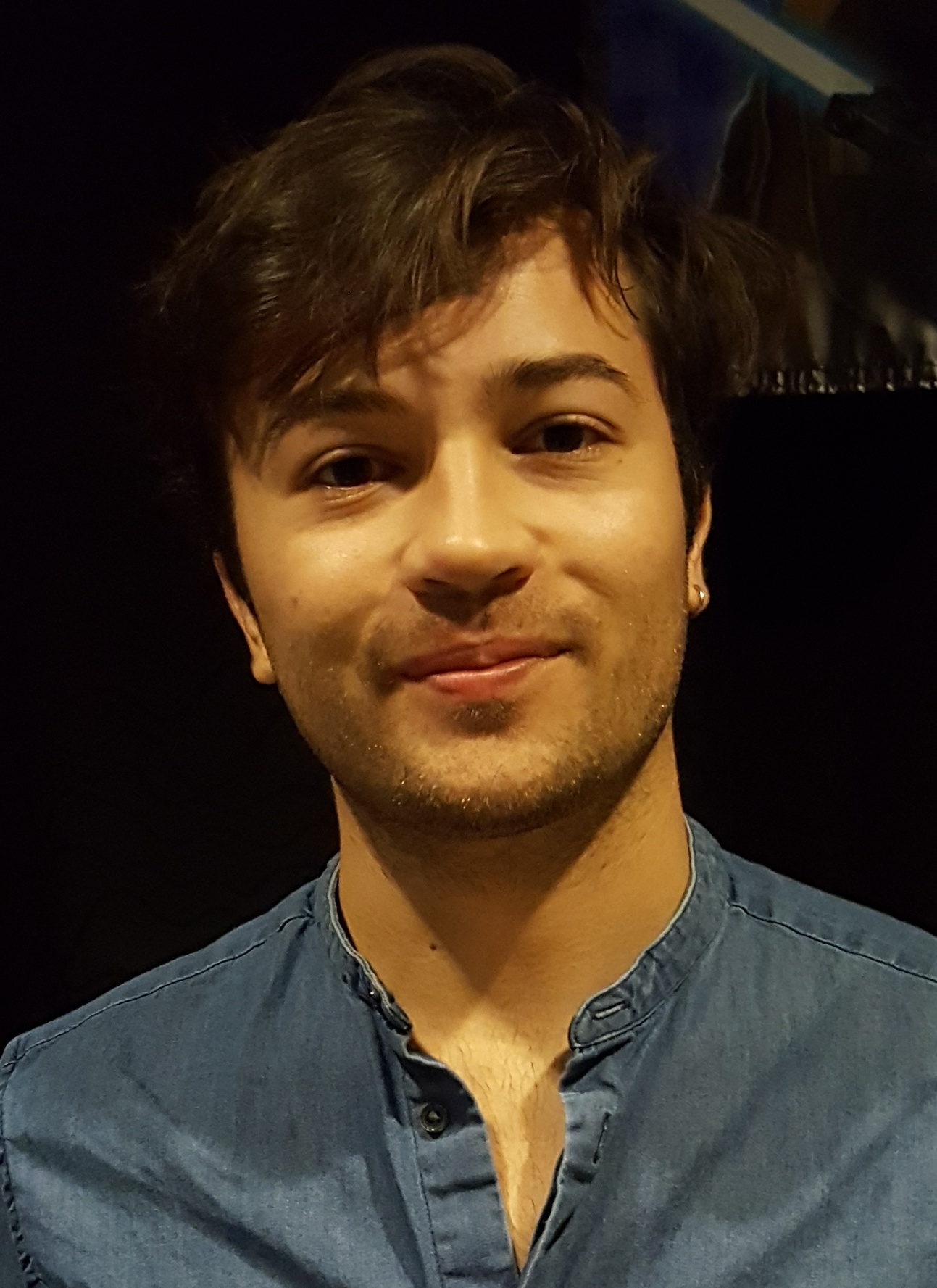
Taylor Gray

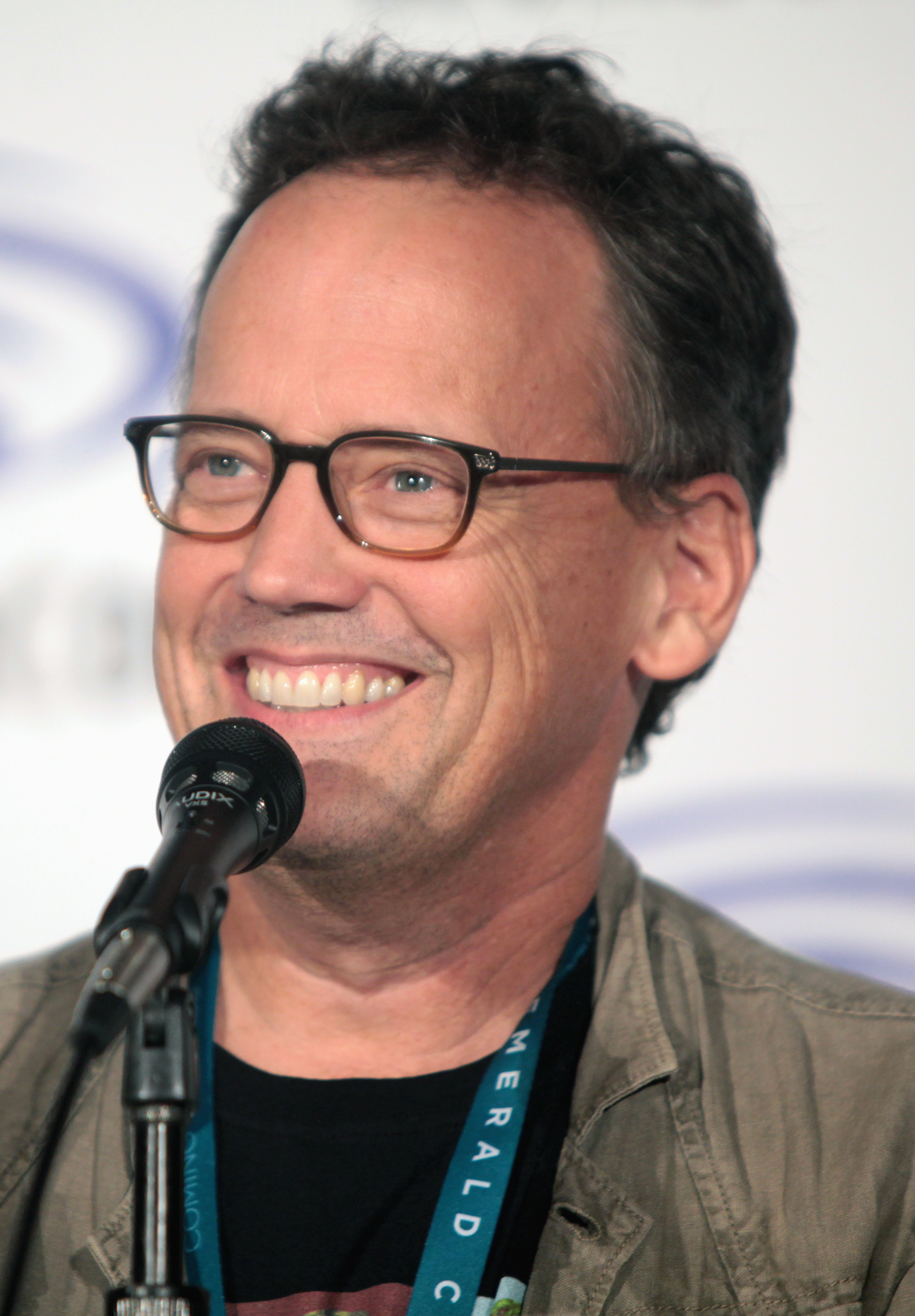
Dee Bradley Baker

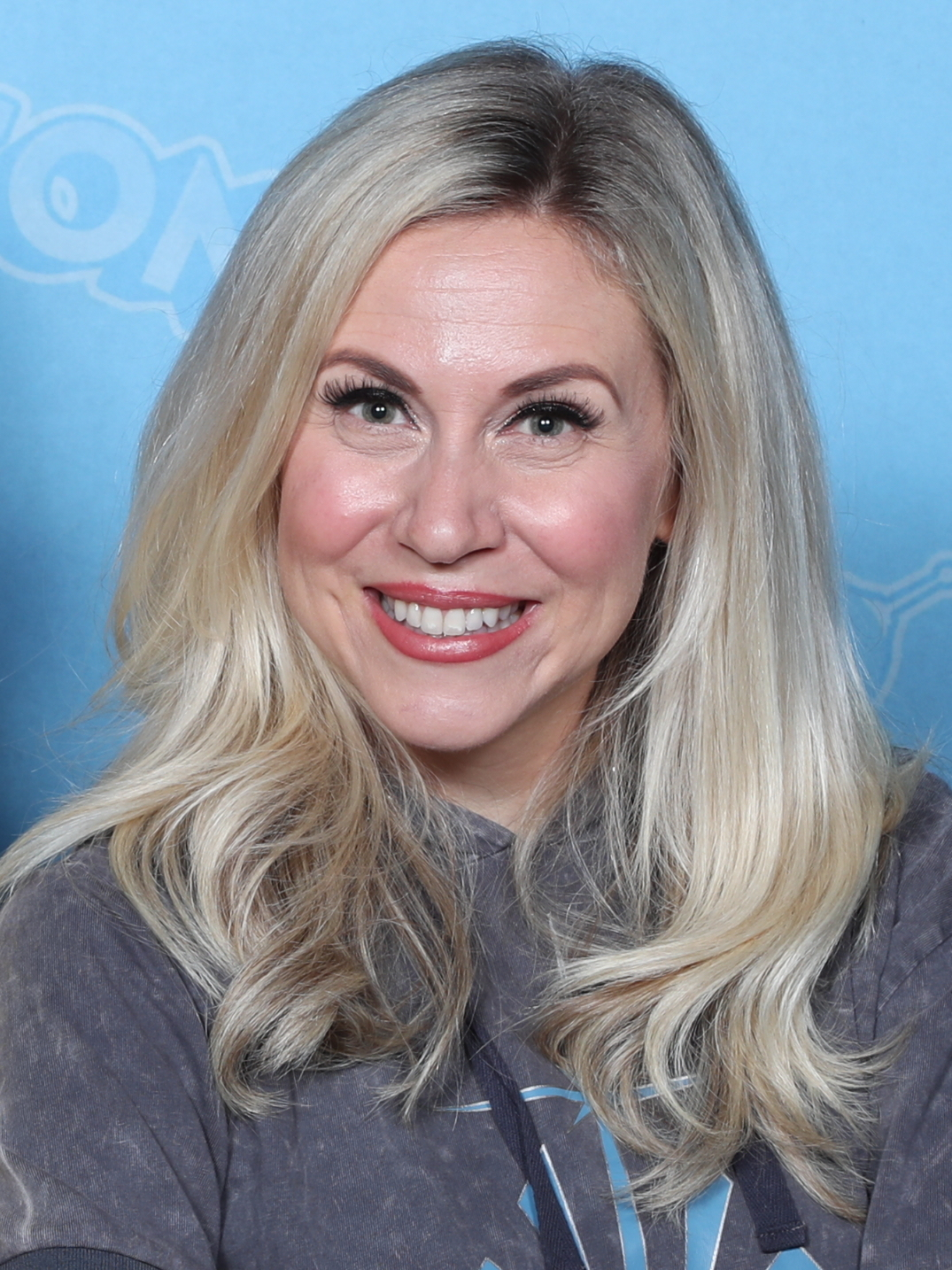
Ashley Eckstein

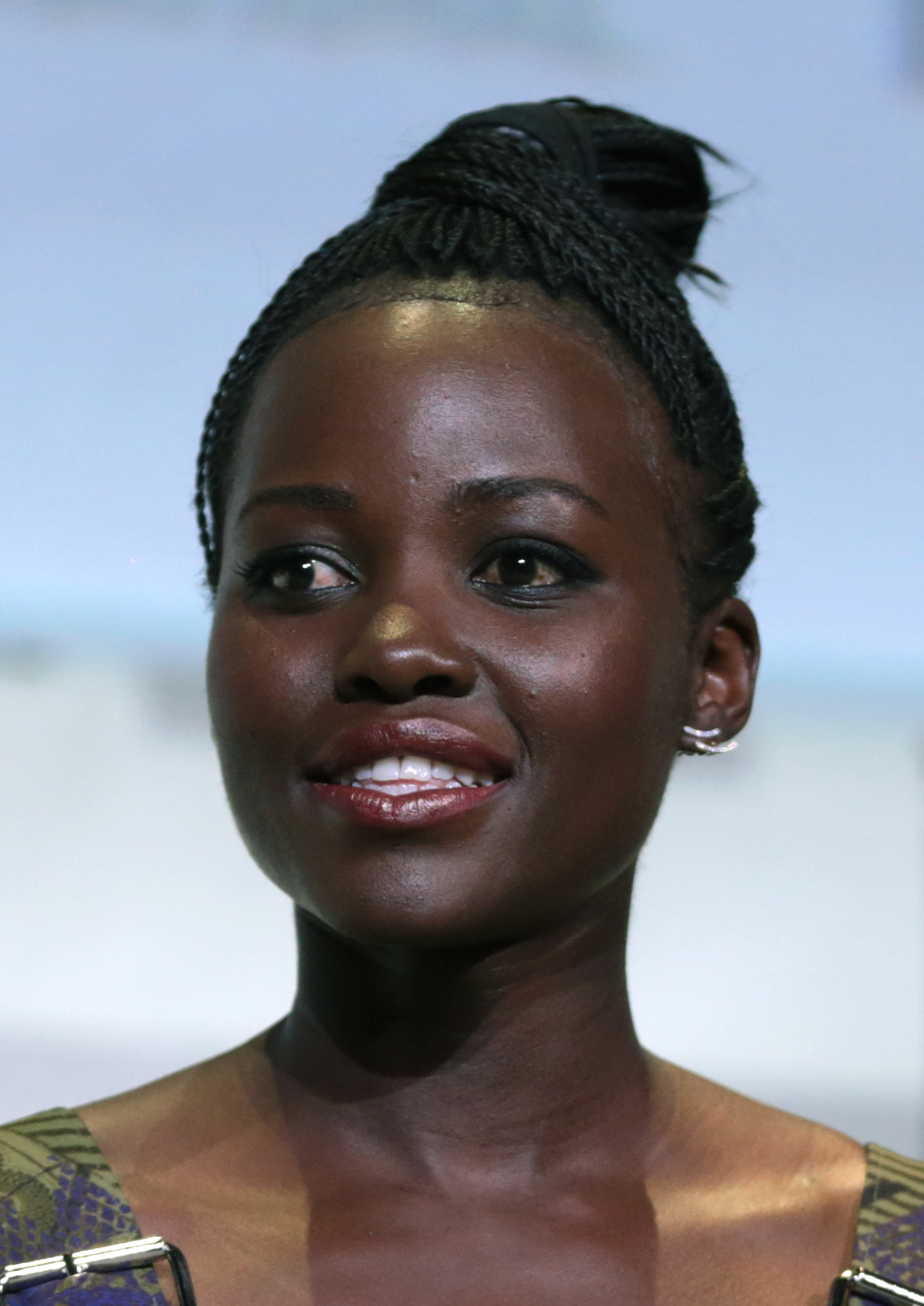
Lupita Nyong'o

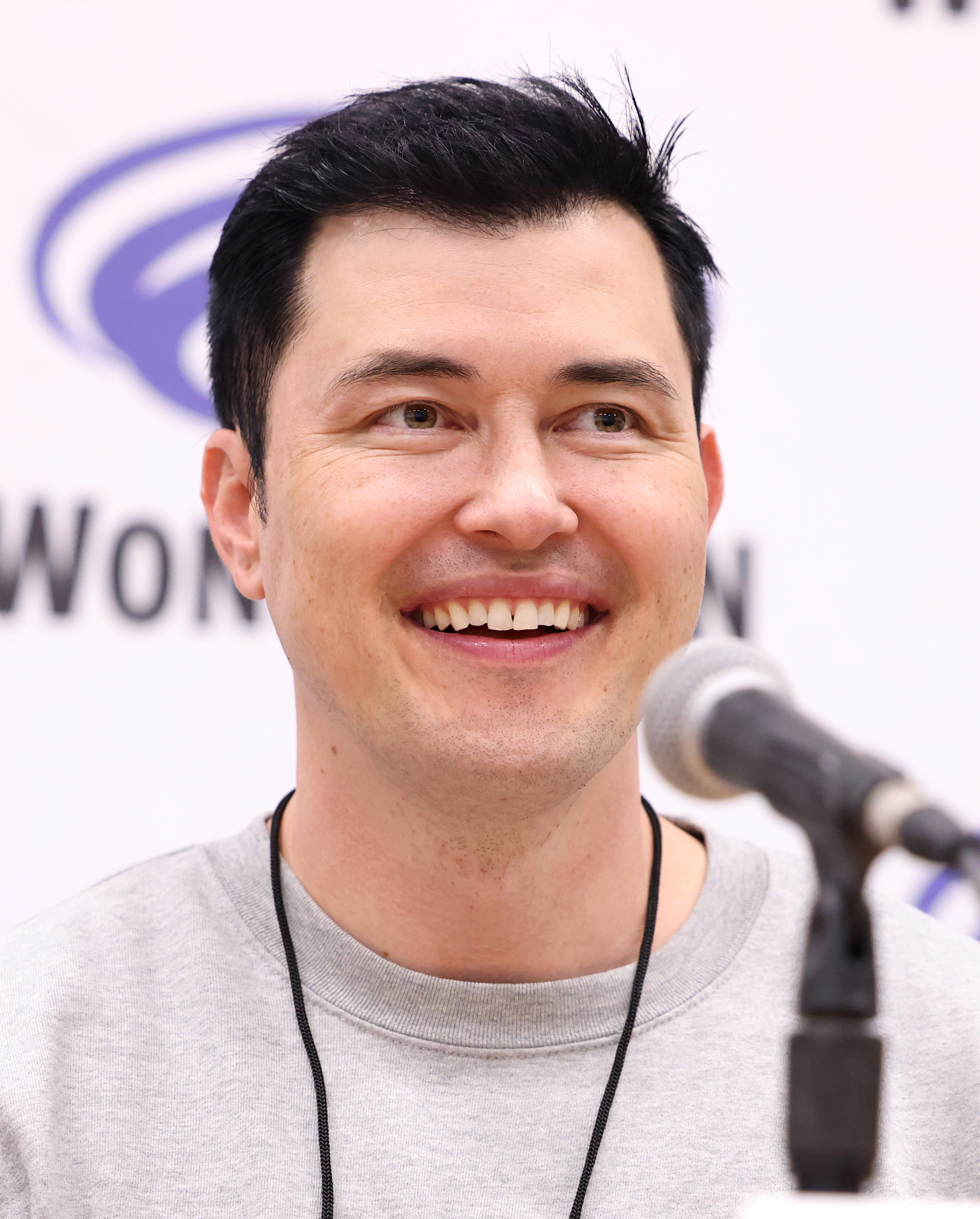
Christopher Sean

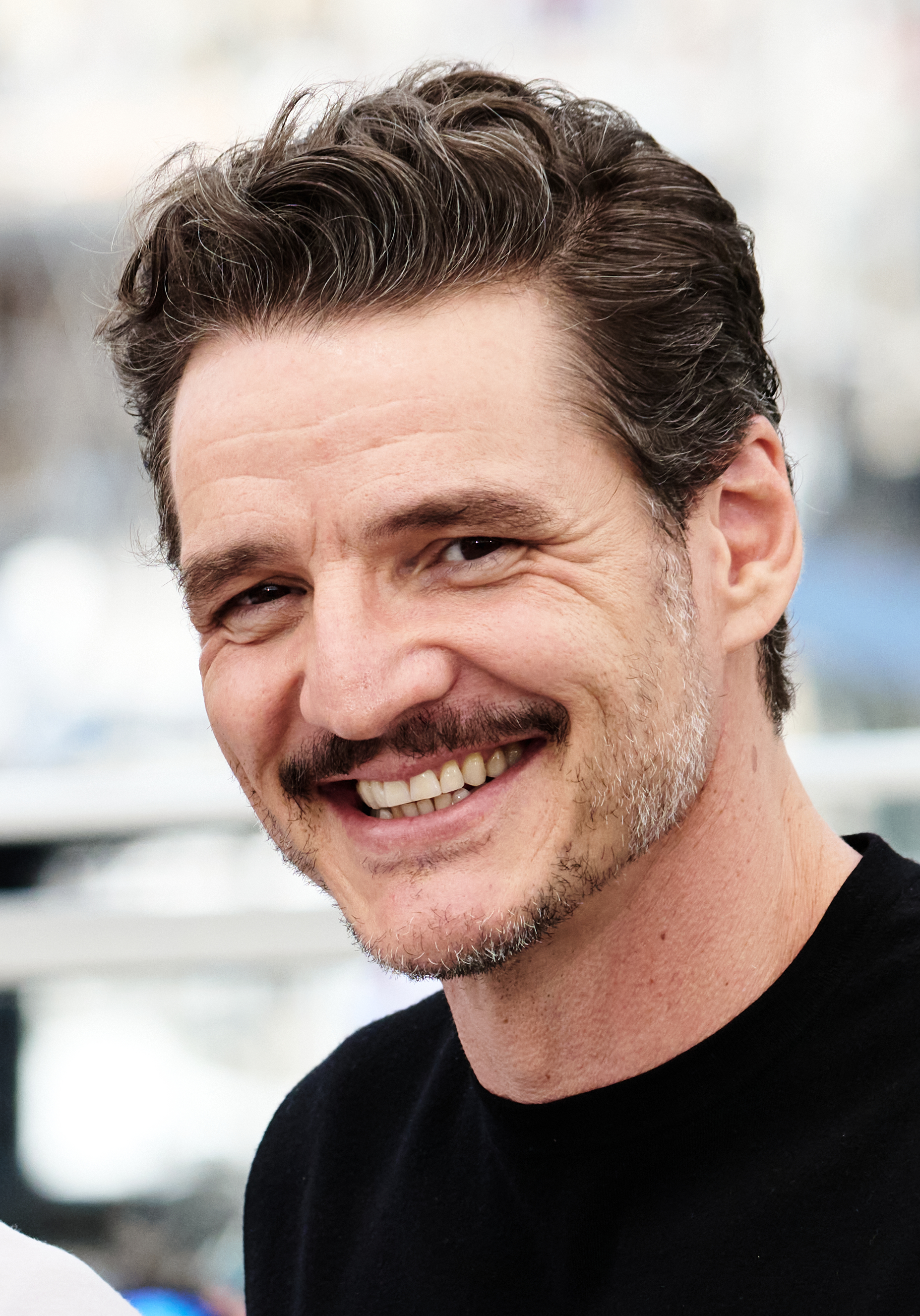
Pedro Pascal

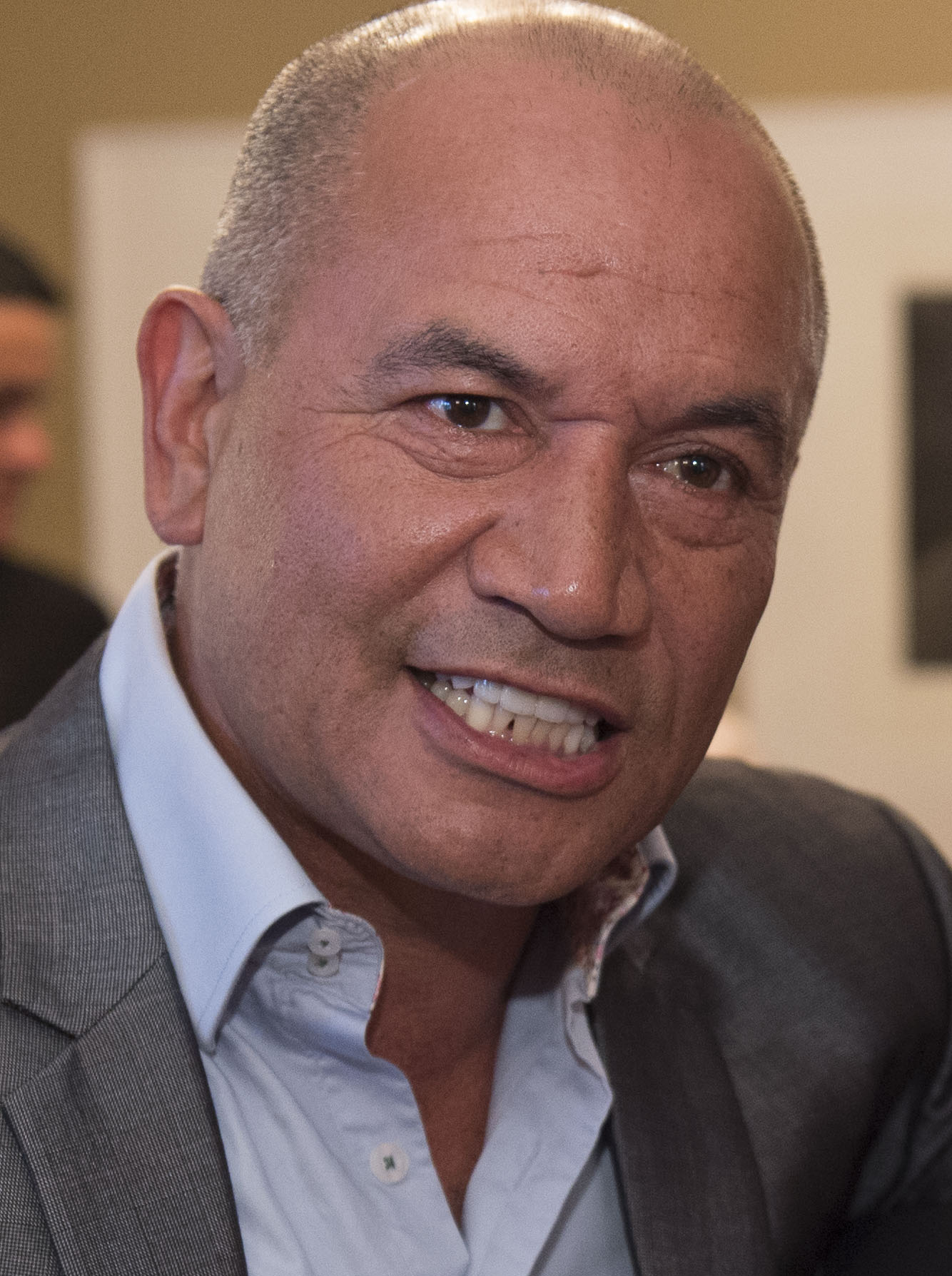
Temuera Morrison

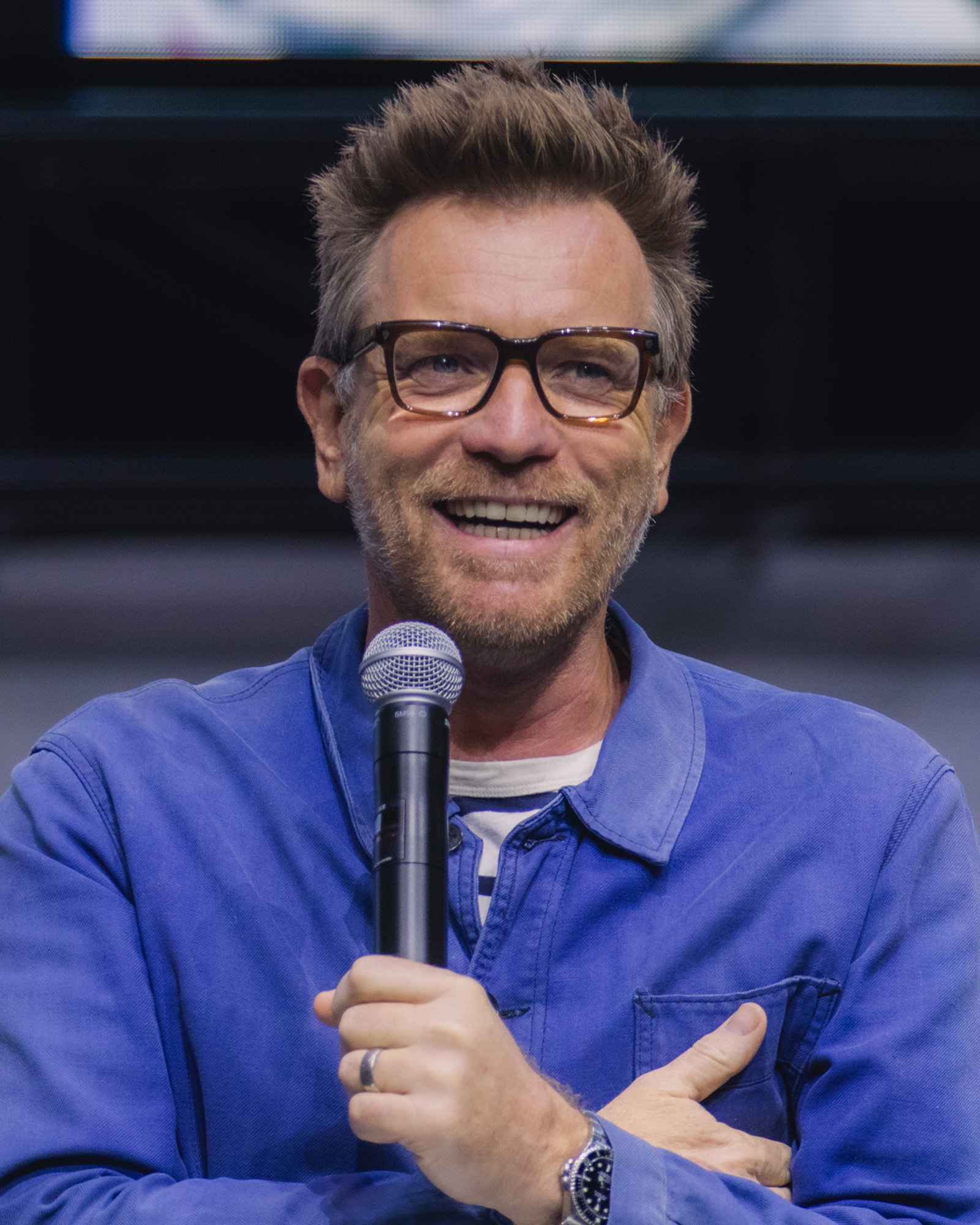
Ewan McGregor

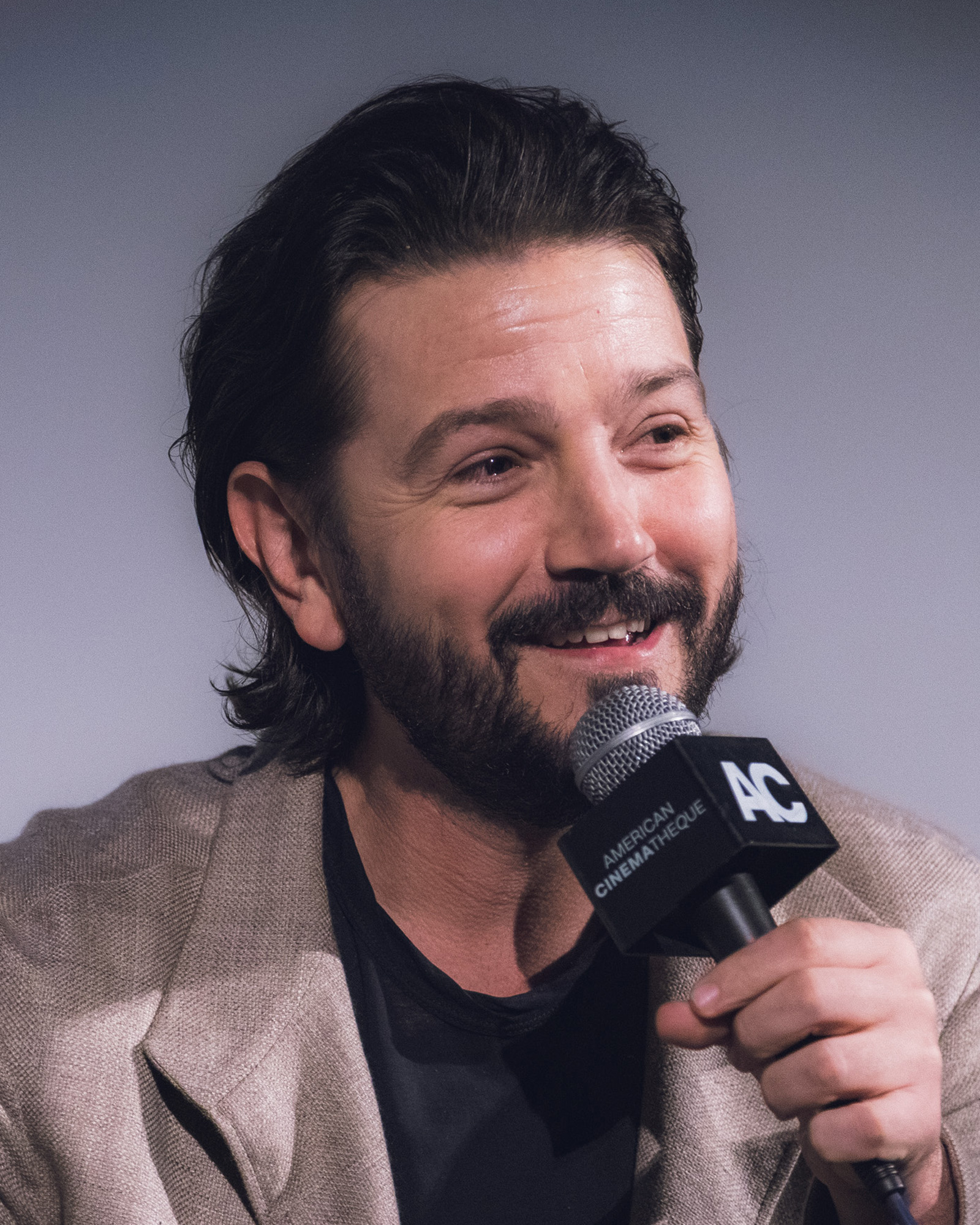
Diego Luna

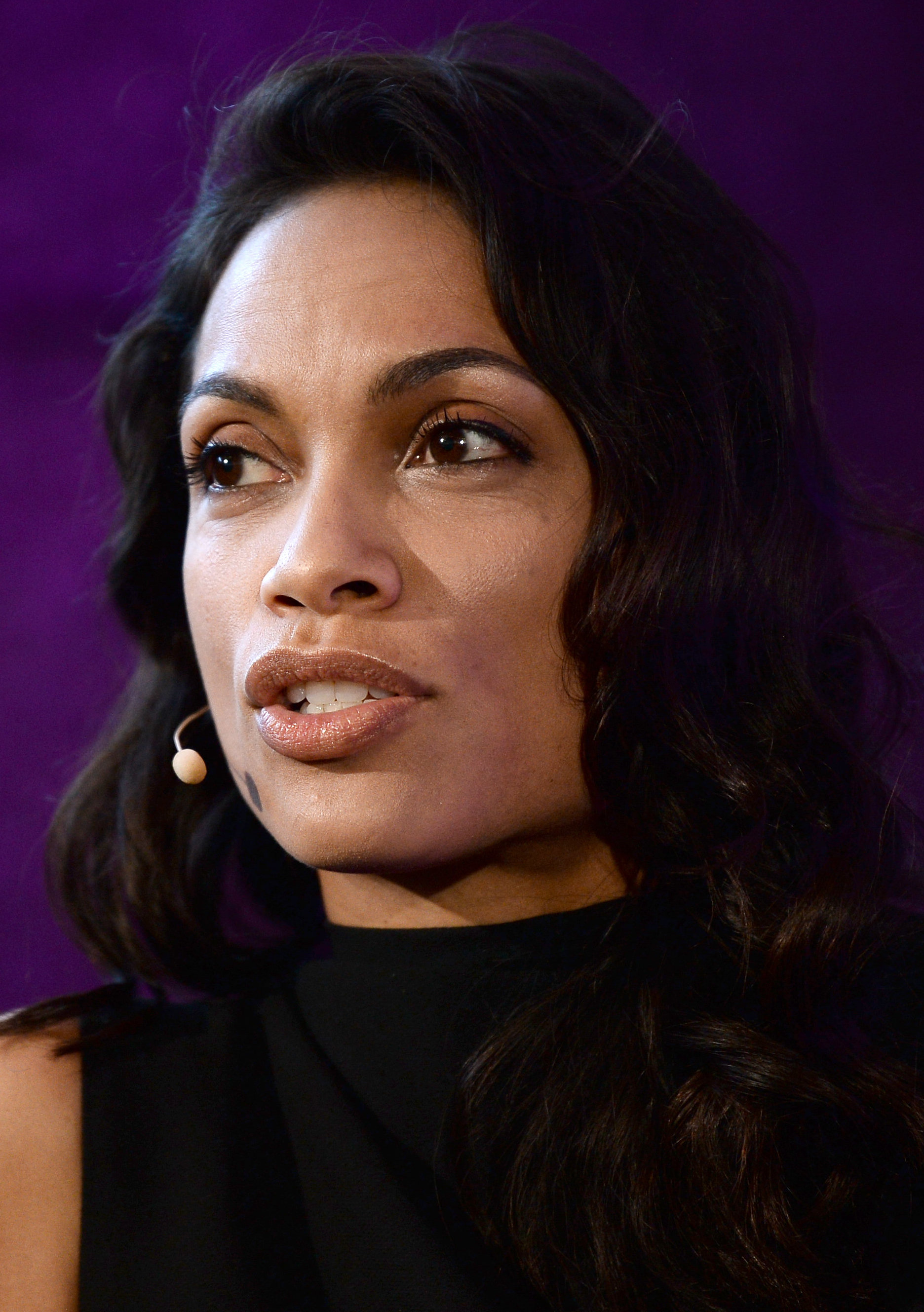
Rosario Dawson

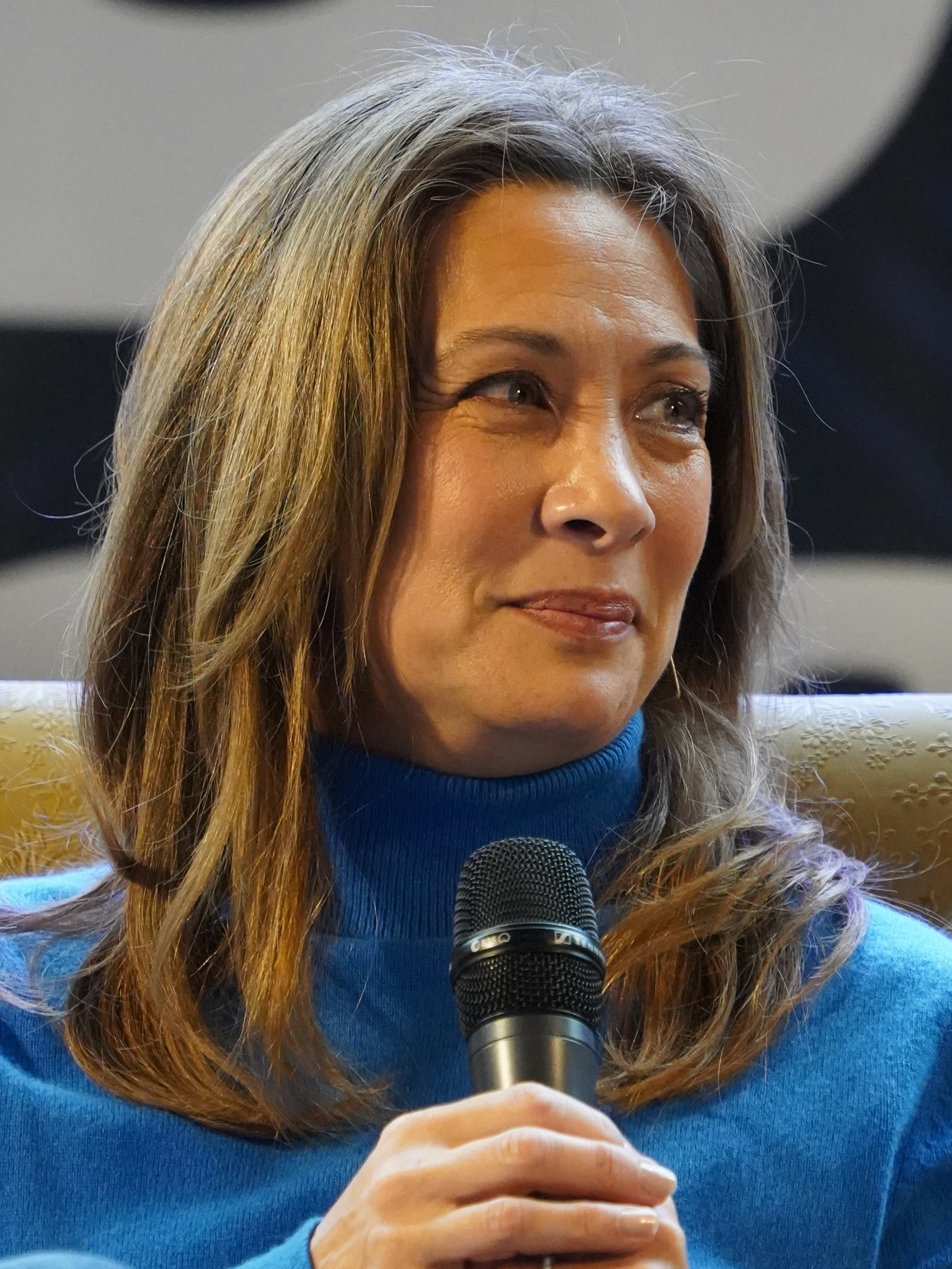
Diana Lee Inosanto

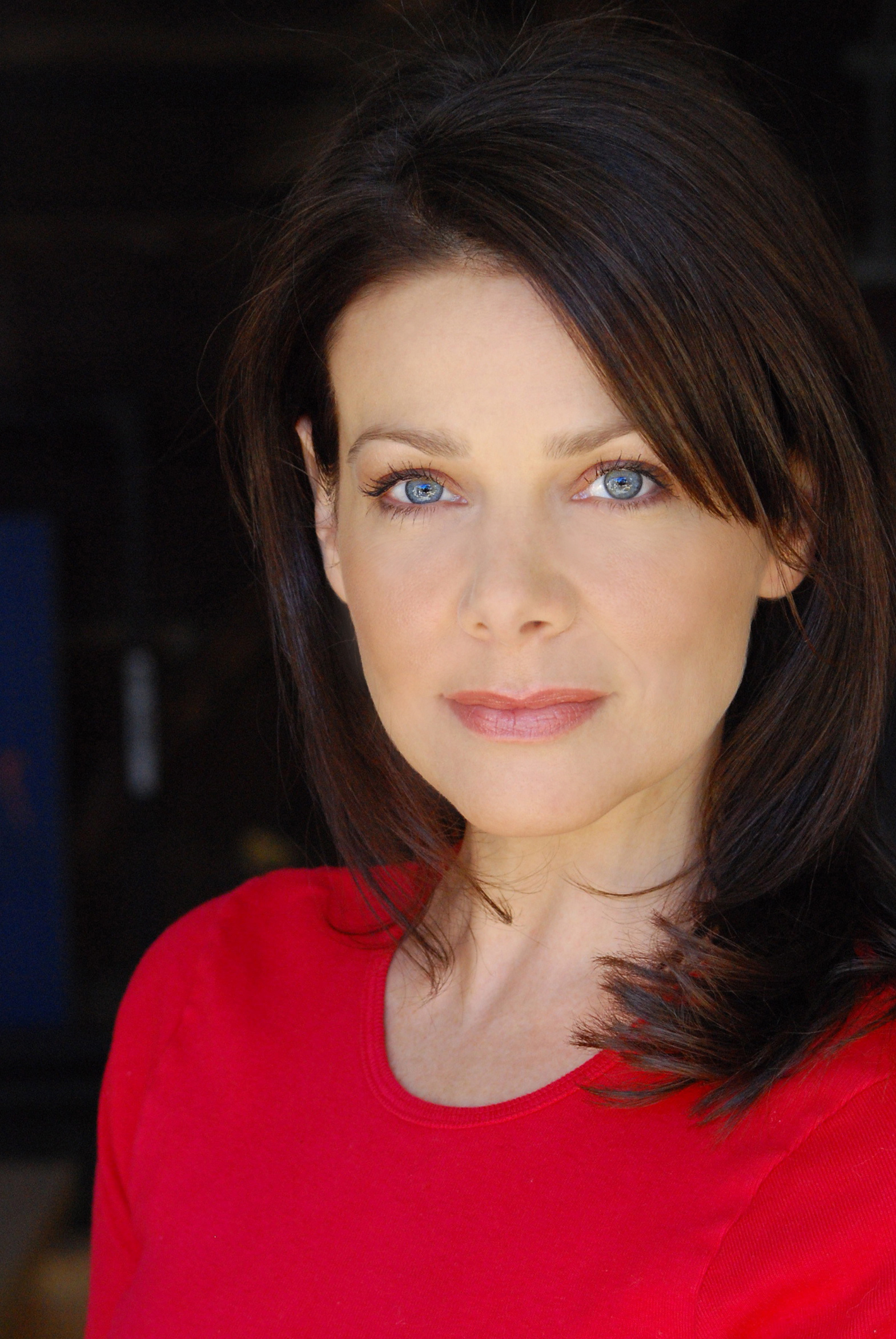
Meredith Salenger

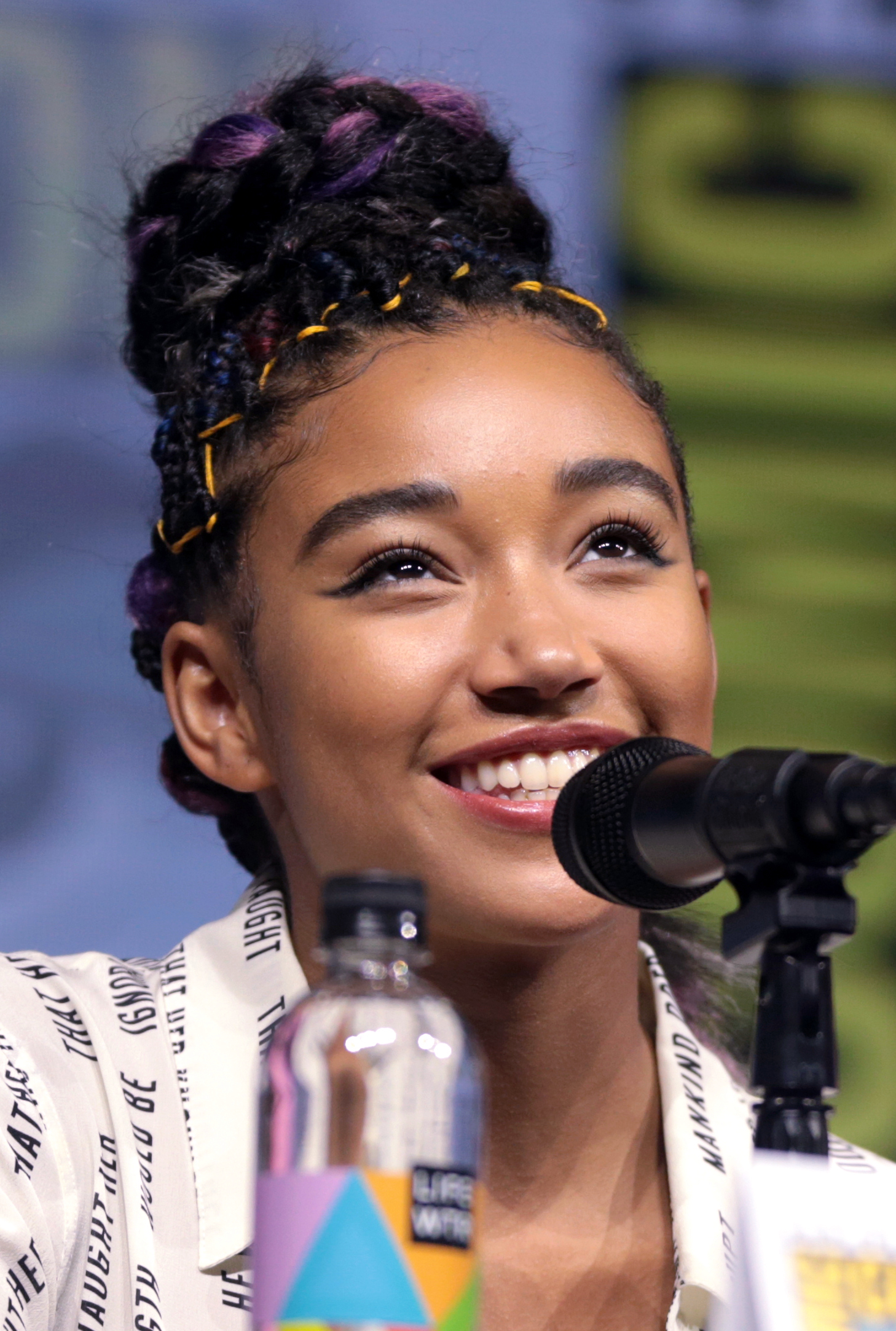
Amandla Stenberg

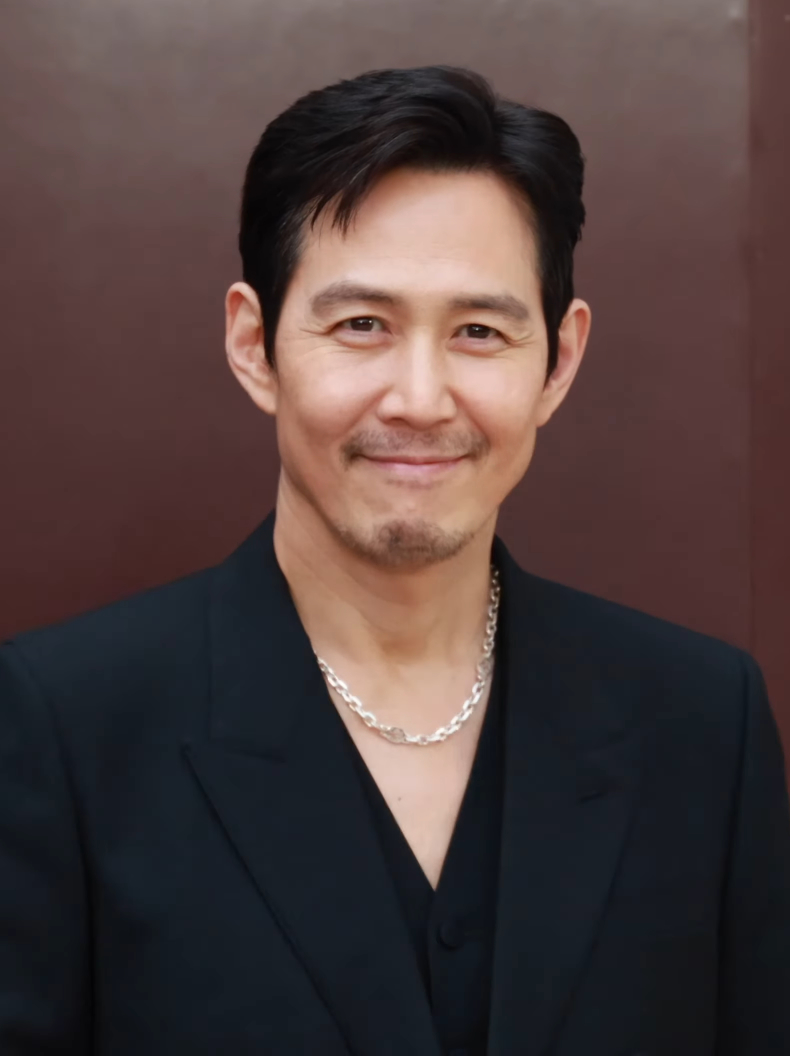
Lee Jung-jae

Daniels, Taylor, Kane, Lanter, Gray, Baker, Eckstein, Nyong'o, Sean, Pascal, Morrison, Luna, McGregor, Dawson, Inosanto, Salenger, Stenberg and Jung-jae headline series across the franchise.

Star Wars is a media franchise and shared fictional universe that is the setting of science fiction television series based on characters created by George Lucas. The first two series in the universe, Star Wars: Droids and Ewoks, began airing on ABC in 1985. Cartoon Network's Star Wars series began in 2003 with Star Wars: Clone Wars, followed by Star Wars: The Clone Wars in 2008. Additionally, the universe expanded to Disney XD with Star Wars Rebels in 2014, then to YouTube with Star Wars Forces of Destiny in 2017, and furthermore to Disney Channel with Star Wars Resistance in 2018. Star Wars: The Bad Batch was the first series to be released on Disney+ in 2021, followed by Star Wars: Visions that same year, Tales of the Jedi in 2022 and Star Wars: Maul - Shadow Lord in 2026. Those series were followed by six live-action series, The Mandalorian, The Book of Boba Fett, Andor, Obi-Wan Kenobi, Ahsoka, The Acolyte and Skeleton Crew.

Droids is headlined by Anthony Daniels as the voice of C-3PO, while Jim Henshaw voices Wicket W. Warrick in the first season of Ewoks with Denny Delk taking over the role for the second season. Clone Wars sees Mat Lucas, James Arnold Taylor, and Tom Kane as Anakin Skywalker, Obi-Wan Kenobi, and Yoda, respectively. Matt Lanter and Ashley Eckstein star as Anakin and Ahsoka Tano in The Clone Wars, along with Taylor and Kane reprising their respective roles as Obi-Wan and Yoda. Taylor Gray is featured as Ezra Bridger in Rebels, while Lupita Nyong'o leads as Maz Kanata in Forces of Destiny and Christopher Sean leads as Kazuda Xiono in Resistance. Dee Bradley Baker voices all members of the Clone Force 99 in The Bad Batch, while Eckstein and Corey Burton star as Ahsoka and Count Dooku, respectively, in Tales of the Jedi, while Diana Lee Inosanto and Meredith Salenger star as Morgan Elsbeth and Barriss Offee, respectively, in Tales of the Empire, while Burton and Nika Futterman star as Cad Bane and Asajj Ventress, respectively, in Tales of the Underworld. Sam Witwer headlines as Darth Maul in Maul - Shadow Lord.

Pedro Pascal stars as the title character in The Mandalorian, while Temuera Morrison headlines The Book of Boba Fett as Boba Fett. Diego Luna reprises his role as Cassian Andor in Andor, while Ewan McGregor headlines Obi-Wan Kenobi, Rosario Dawson reprises her role as Ahsoka Tano in Ahsoka, Amandla Stenberg stars in a dual role as twins; Osha and Mae Aniseya alongside Lee Jung-jae as Jedi Master Sol in The Acolyte and Jude Law stars as Jod Na Nawood in Skeleton Crew.

== Animated series ==
List indicators

This section includes main cast members, recurring characters, and notable guest stars.

- An empty grey cell indicates the character was not in the film, or that the character's official presence has not yet been confirmed.
- ^{A} indicates an appearance through archival footage or audio.
- ^{C} indicates a cameo role.
- ^{G} indicates a guest appearance in the season.
- ^{Y} indicates a younger version of the character.
- ^{F} indicates the character appears in a film.
- ^{LA} indicates the character appears in a live-action series.
- ^{M} indicates the actor was part of the main cast in the series.
- ^{TF} indicates the character appears in a television film.

Character	Star Wars: Droids	Ewoks	Star Wars: Clone Wars	Star Wars: The Clone Wars	Star Wars Rebels	Star Wars Forces of Destiny	Star Wars Resistance	Star Wars: The Bad Batch	Star Wars: Visions	Tales of the Jedi	Tales of the Empire	Tales of the Underworld	Maul - Shadow Lord
Character	1985–86		2003–05	2008–20	2014–18	2017–18	2018–20	2021–24	2021–	2022	2024	2025	2026-
=== Introduced in films ===
Gial Ackbar				Artt Butler^{G}									
Mas Amedda				Stephen Stanton									
Padmé Amidala			Grey DeLisle	Catherine Taber^{M}		Catherine Taber^{M}							
Wedge Antilles					Nathan Kress								
Battle droids			André Sogliuzzo	Matthew Wood	Matthew Wood			Matthew Wood	Matthew Wood				
Depa Billaba				Appeared				Archie Panjabi		Appeared			
Jar Jar Binks				Ahmed Best Phil LaMarr									
Bossk				Dee Bradley Baker									
Lando Calrissian					Billy Dee Williams^{G}								
Chief Chirpa		George Buza^{M} Rick Cimino^{M}											
C-3PO	Anthony Daniels^{M}		Anthony Daniels^{M}	Anthony Daniels	Anthony Daniels	Anthony Daniels	Anthony Daniels						
Clone troopers			André Sogliuzzo	Dee Bradley Baker	Dee Bradley Baker			Dee Bradley Baker^{M}		Dee Bradley Baker	Dee Bradley Baker		
Poe Dameron							Oscar Isaac						
Dengar				Simon Pegg^{G}									
Tan Divo				Tom Kenny									
Jan Dodonna					Michael Bell								
Count Dooku Darth Tyranus			Corey Burton	Corey Burton						Corey Burton			
Jyn Erso						Felicity Jones^{M} Helen Sadler^{M}							
Onaconda Farr				Dee Bradley Baker									
Boba Fett^{LA}	Don Francks			Daniel Logan					Temuera Morrison				
Finn						John Boyega							
Kit Fisto				Phil LaMarr									
Bib Fortuna^{LA}								Matthew Wood					
Adi Gallia				Angelique Perrin									
Greedo				Tom Kenny									
Nute Gunray				Tom Kenny									
Jabba the Hutt				Kevin Michael Richardson									
Ziro the Hutt				Corey Burton									
Armitage Hux							Domhnall Gleeson^{A} Ben Prendergast						
Qui-Gon Jinn^{LA}			Fred Tatasciore	Liam Neeson^{G}						Liam Neeson Micheál Richardson^{Y}			
Maz Kanata						Lupita Nyong'o^{M}							
Obi-Wan Kenobi^{LA}			James Arnold Taylor^{M}	James Arnold Taylor^{M}	Stephen Stanton James Arnold Taylor^{Y}					James Arnold Taylor			Appeared
Ki-Adi-Mundi			Daran Norris	Brian George						Brian George			
Derek "Hobbie" Klivian				Trevor Devall^{G}									
Plo Koon				James Arnold Taylor									
Logray		Doug Chamberlain^{M}											
Darth Maul				Sam Witwer	Sam Witwer								Sam Witwer
Mon Mothma^{LA}				Kath Soucie^{G}	Genevieve O'Reilly								
Jocasta Nu				Flo Di Re^{G}						Flo Di Re			
Barriss Offee				Meredith Salenger							Meredith Salenger		
Bail Organa^{LA}				Phil LaMarr	Phil LaMarr			Phil LaMarr		Phil LaMarr			
Leia Organa^{LA}					Julie Dolan^{G}	Shelby Young^{M}	Carolyn Hennesy						
Palpatine Darth Sidious			Nick Jameson^{M}	Ian Abercrombie Tim Curry Ian McDiarmid^{A}	Sam Witwer Ian McDiarmid			Ian McDiarmid		Ian McDiarmid			Sam Witwer
Tynnra Pamlo								Sharon Duncan-Brewster					
Captain Phasma							Gwendoline Christie Ellen Dubin						
Even Piell			Appeared	Blair Bess									
Qi'ra						Olivia Hack							
Rey						Daisy Ridley^{M}							
Captain Rex				Dee Bradley Baker	Dee Bradley Baker			Dee Bradley Baker^{M}		Dee Bradley Baker			
Aayla Secura				Jennifer Hale									
Aurra Sing				Jaime King									
Anakin Skywalker Darth Vader^{LA}			Mat Lucas^{M}	Matt Lanter	James Earl Jones Matt Lanter^{C}	Matt Lanter				Matt Lanter			Appeared
Luke Skywalker^{LA}					Appeared	Mark Hamill							
Shmi Skywalker-Lars				Pernilla August^{G}									
Han Solo						Kiff VandenHeuvel A.J. LoCascio^{Y}							
Lama Su				Bob Bergen				Bob Bergen					
Orn Free Taa				Phil LaMarr				Phil LaMarr					
Ahsoka Tano^{LA}				Ashley Eckstein^{M}	Ashley Eckstein^{M}	Ashley Eckstein^{M}				Ashley Eckstein^{M}			
Willhuff Tarkin				Stephen Stanton	Stephen Stanton			Stephen Stanton					
Teebo		Eric Peterson^{M} James Cranna^{M}											
Teedo						David Acord							
Shaak Ti			Grey DeLisle	Tasia Valenza									
Rose Tico						Kelly Marie Tran							
Luminara Unduli			Cree Summer	Olivia d'Abo	Appeared								
Quinlan Vos				Al Rodrigo								Al Rodrigo	Scott Whyte
Wicket W. Warrick		Jim Henshaw^{M} Denny Delk^{M}				Dee Bradley Baker							
Widdle "Willy" Warrick^{TF}		John Stocker											
Taun We								Rena Owen					
Mace Windu			Terrence C. Carson	Terrence C. Carson						Terrence C. Carson			
Yaddle										Bryce Dallas Howard			
Yoda			Tom Kane^{M}	Tom Kane^{M}	Frank Oz	Tom Kane							
Wullf Yularen^{LA}				Tom Kane	Tom Kane								
=== Introduced in television films ===
Weechee Warrick		Greg Swanson											
=== Introduced in live-action series ===
Morgan Elsbeth											Diana Lee Inosanto		
Lyn Rakish Fourth Sister											Rya Kihlstedt		
Marrok First Brother											Appeared		AJ LoCascio
Fennec Shand								Ming-Na Wen					
Governor Wing											Wing T. Chao		
=== Introduced in comics ===
Rook Kast				Vanessa Marshall									Vanessa Marshall
Gar Saxon				Ray Stevenson	Ray Stevenson								
=== Introduced in Ewoks ===
Kneesaa a Jari Kintaka		Cree Summer^{M} Jeanne Reynolds^{M}											
Malani		Alyson Court											
Morag		Jackie Burroughs											
Umwak		Don Francks											
=== Introduced in Clone Wars ===
Asajj Ventress			Grey DeLisle^{M}	Nika Futterman				Nika Futterman				Nika Futterman	
Grievous^{F}			John DiMaggio^{G} Richard McGonagle^{M}	Matthew Wood^{M}							Matthew Wood		
=== Introduced in The Clone Wars ===
Almec				Julian Holloway									
AZI-3				Ben Diskin				Ben Diskin					
Cad Bane^{LA}				Corey Burton				Corey Burton				Corey Burton	
Darth Bane				Mark Hamill^{G}									
Lux Bonteri				Jason Spisak									
Mina Bonteri				Kath Soucie									
Riyo Chuchi				Jennifer Hale				Jennifer Hale					
Rush Clovis				Robin Atkin Downes									
Lok Durd				George Takei^{G}									
Embo				Dave Filoni									
Saw Gerrera^{LA}				Andrew Kishino	Forest Whitaker			Andrew Kishino					
Huyang^{LA}				David Tennant^{G}									
General Kalani				Gregg Berger	Gregg Berger								
Bo-Katan Kryze^{LA}				Katee Sackhoff	Katee Sackhoff^{G}								
Satine Kryze				Anna Graves									
Rafa Martez				Elizabeth Rodriguez				Elizabeth Rodriguez					
Trace Martez				Brigitte Kali				Brigitte Kali					
Hondo Ohnaka				Jim Cummings	Jim Cummings	Jim Cummings							
Savage Opress				Clancy Brown									Clancy Brown
Latts Razzi				Clare Grant								Clare Grant	
Nala Se				Gwendoline Yeo				Gwendoline Yeo					
Cham Syndulla				Robin Atkin Downes	Robin Atkin Downes			Robin Atkin Downes					
Mother Talzin				Barbara Goodson								Barbara Goodson	
Todo 360				Seth Green				Seth Green					
Admiral Trench				Dee Bradley Baker									
Pre Vizsla				Jon Favreau									
=== Introduced in Rebels ===
Cumberlayne Aresko					David Shaughnessy								
Ryder Azadi^{LA}					Clancy Brown								
The Bendu					Tom Baker								
Ezra Bridger^{LA}					Taylor Gray^{M}	Taylor Gray^{M}							
C1-10P "Chopper"^{LA}					Dave Filoni^{M}	Dave Filoni^{M}			Dave Filoni				
Fifth Brother^{LA}					Philip Anthony-Rodriguez								
Grand Inquisitor^{LA}					Jason Isaacs						Jason Isaacs		
Kanan Jarrus Caleb Dume^{F}				Appeared	Freddie Prinze Jr.^{M}			Freddie Prinze Jr.		Appeared			
Alexsandr Kallus					David Oyelowo								
Jai Kell^{LA}					Dante Basco								
Kassius Konstantine					Dee Bradley Baker								
Mart Mattin					Zachary Gordon								
Ketsu Onyo					Gina Torres	Gina Torres							
Garazeb "Zeb" Orrelios^{LA}					Steve Blum^{M}								
Gilad Pellaeon^{LA}					Xander Berkeley						Xander Berkeley		
Arihnda Pryce					Mary Elizabeth McGlynn								
Fenn Rau					Kevin McKidd								
Rukh					Warwick Davis						Warwick Davis		
Jun Sato					Keone Young								
Seventh Sister					Sarah Michelle Gellar								
Hera Syndulla^{LA}					Vanessa Marshall^{M}	Vanessa Marshall^{M}		Vanessa Marshall					
Grand Admiral Thrawn^{LA}					Lars Mikkelsen						Lars Mikkelsen		
Cikatro Vizago					Keith Szarabajka								
Sabine Wren^{LA}					Tiya Sircar^{M}	Tiya Sircar^{M}							
Tristan Wren					Ritesh Rajan	Ritesh Rajan							
Ursa Wren				Sharmila Devar^{G}	Sharmila Devar^{G}								
=== Introduced in Resistance ===
4D-M1N							Mary Elizabeth McGlynn						
Ello Asty							Matthew Wood						
Imanuel Doza							Jason Hightower^{M}						
Torra Doza							Myrna Velasco^{M}						
Venisa Doza							Tasia Valenza						
Drell							David Shaughnessy						
Eila							Nikki SooHoo						
Hype Fazon							Donald Faison^{M}						
Freya Fenris							Mary Elizabeth McGlynn						
Flix							Jim Rash						
Mia Gabon							Cherami Leigh						
Lieutenant Galek							Christine Dunford						
Garma							Greg Proops						
Glem							Dee Bradley Baker						
Kragan Gorr							Gary Anthony Williams						
Grevel							Dee Bradley Baker						
Mika Grey							Tudi Roche						
Bolza Grool							Fred Tatasciore						
Griff Halloran							Stephen Stanton						
Bo Keevil							Dave Filoni						
Kel							Antony Del Rio						
Norath Kev							Daveed Diggs						
Leoz							Steve Blum						
Orka							Bobby Moynihan						
Queen of the Aeosians							Lucy Lawless						
Commander Pyre							Liam McIntyre^{M}						
Tam Ryvora							Suzie McGrath^{M}						
Jace Rucklin							Elijah Wood						
Synara San							Nazneen Contractor^{M}						
Hugh Sion							Sam Witwer						
Jak Sivrak							Greg Proops						
Ax Tagrin							Joe Manganiello						
Agent Tierny							Sumalee Montano^{M}						
Elrik Vonreg							Lex Lang						
Neeku Vozo							Josh Brener^{M}						
Vranki							John DiMaggio						
Hamato Xiono							Tzi Ma						
Kazuda Xiono							Christopher Sean^{M}						
Jarek Yeager							Scott Lawrence^{M}						
Z'Vk'Thkrkza Aunt Z							Scott Lawrence						
=== Introduced in The Bad Batch ===
Romar Adell								Héctor Elizondo					
Tawni Ames								Tasia Valenza					
Benni Baro								Yuri Lowenthal					
Captain Bragg								Shelby Young					
Bolo								Liam O'Brien					
Roland Durand								Tom Taylorson					
ES-02								Tina Huang					
ES-03								Ness Bautista					
ES-04								Dahéli Hall					
Phee Genoa								Wanda Sykes					
Governor Grotton								Max Mittelman					
GS-8								Sian Clifford					
Royce Hemlock								Jimmi Simpson					
Emerie Karr								Keisha Castle-Hughes					
Ketch								Sam Riegel					
Grini Millegi								Ernie Hudson					
Lieutenant Nolan								Crispin Freeman					
Omega								Michelle Ang^{M}					
Ciddarin "Cid" Scaleback								Rhea Perlman					
Doctor Scalder								Helen Sadler					
Avi Singh								Alexander Siddig					
Eleni Syndulla								Ferelith Young					
TAY-0								Ben Schwartz					
Babwa Venomor								JP Karliak					
=== Introduced in Visions ===
Am									Alison Brie				
Bandit Leader									Lucy Liu				
Dan									Jordan Fisher				
The Elder									James Hong				
Ethan									Masi Oka				
F									Karen Fukuhara				
Geezer									Bobby Moynihan				
Haru									Nichole Sakura				
Izuma									Andrew Kishino				
Jay									Joseph Gordon-Levitt				
Hen Jin									Michael Sinterniklaas				
Imperial Office									Kyle McCarley				
Izuma									Andrew Kishino				
K-344									Shelby Young				
Kamahachi									Keone Young				
Kara									Kimiko Glenn				
Karre									Neil Patrick Harris				
Lan									Marc Thompson				
Lop									Anna Cathcart				
Masago									Lorraine Toussaint				
Misa									Jamie Chung				
Mitaka									Kyle Chandler				
Ocho									Hiromi Dames				
Roden									Greg Chun				
Ronin									Brian Tee				
Saku									Stephanie Sheh				
Senshuu									George Takei				
Tajin									David Harbour				
Tsubaki									Henry Golding				
Valco									Cary-Hiroyuki Tagawa				
Yasaburo									Paul Nakauchi				
Zhima									Simu Liu				
=== Introduced in Tales of the Jedi ===
Senator Dagonet										Mark Rolston			
Gantika										Toks Olagundoye			
Senator Larik										Theo Rossi			
Nak-il										Sunil Malhotra			
Eleventh Brother										Clancy Brown	Appeared		Appeared
Pav-ti Tano										Janina Gavankar			
=== Introduced in Tales of the Empire ===
Ahmar											Zeno Robinson		
Dante											Nicolas Cantu		
Mountain Clan Matron											Lydia Look		
Nadura											Shelby Young		
Nali											Daisy Lightfoot		
Reggi											Steve Blum		
Selena											Diana Lee Inosanto		
The Jedi											Ry Chase		
Young Girl											Jordyn Curet		
=== Introduced in Tales of the Underworld ===
Arin												Dawn-Lyen Gardner	
Lyco Strata												Lane Factor	

== Live-action series ==
List indicators

This section includes main cast members, recurring characters, and notable guest stars.

- An empty grey cell indicates the character was not in the series, or that the character's official presence has not yet been confirmed.
- ^{G} indicates a guest appearance in the series.
- ^{R} indicates a recurring role in the series.
- ^{V} indicates a voice-only role.
- ^{Y} indicates a younger version of the character.
- ^{AS} indicates the character appears in an animated series.

Character	The Mandalorian	The Book of Boba Fett	Obi-Wan Kenobi	Andor	Ahsoka	The Acolyte	Skeleton Crew
Character	2019–	2021–22	2022	2022–25	2023–	2024	2024–25
=== Introduced in films ===
8D8		Matt Berry					
Cassian Andor				Diego Luna Antonio Viña^{Y}			
C-3PO^{AS}			Anthony Daniels		Anthony Daniels		
Davits Draven				Alistair Petrie			
Boba Fett^{AS}	Temuera Morrison^{R}	Temuera Morrison					
K-2SO				Alan Tudyk			
Obi-Wan Kenobi^{AS}			Ewan McGregor				
Orson Krennic				Ben Mendelsohn			
Owen Lars			Joel Edgerton				
Beru Whitesun Lars			Bonnie Piesse				
Ruescott Melshi				Duncan Pow			
Ki-Adi-Mundi^{AS}						Derek Arnold	
Mon Mothma^{AS}				Genevieve O'Reilly	Genevieve O'Reilly		
Bail Organa^{AS}			Jimmy Smits	Benjamin Bratt			
Breha Organa			Simone Kessell				
Leia Organa^{AS}			Vivien Lyra Blair				
Luke Skywalker^{AS}	Mark Hamill^{G}	Mark Hamill	Grant Feely				
Anakin Skywalker Darth Vader^{AS}			Hayden Christensen		Hayden Christensen		
Ahsoka Tano^{AS}	Rosario Dawson^{G}	Rosario Dawson^{G}			Rosario Dawson Ariana Greenblatt^{Y}		
Yoda^{AS}						Appeared	
Wullf Yularen^{AS}				Malcolm Sinclair			
=== Introduced in animated series ===
Ryder Azadi					Clancy Brown		
Cad Bane		Corey Burton^{V}					
Ezra Bridger					Eman Esfandi		
Fifth Brother			Sung Kang				
C1-10P "Chopper"					Dave Filoni^{V}		
Saw Gerrera^{AS}				Forest Whitaker			
Grand Inquisitor			Rupert Friend				
Huyang					David Tennant		
Jai Kell					Vinny Thomas		
Bo-Katan Kryze	Katee Sackhoff						
Garazeb "Zeb" Orrelios	Steve Blum^{V}				Steve Blum ^{V}		
Gilad Pellaeon	Xander Berkeley						
Captain Rex					Temuera Morrison^{V}		
Erskin Semaj				Pierro Niel-Mee			
Hera Syndulla					Mary Elizabeth Winstead		
Jacen Syndulla					Evan Whitten		
Grand Admiral Thrawn					Lars Mikkelsen		
Sabine Wren					Natasha Liu Bordizzo		
Hamato Xiono					Nelson Lee		
=== Introduced in The Mandalorian ===
The Mandalorian Din Djarin	Pedro Pascal Aidan Bertola^{Y}	Pedro Pascal Aidan Bertola^{Y}					
"The Armorer"	Emily Swallow^{R}	Emily Swallow^{R}					
"The Client"	Werner Herzog^{R}						
Cara Dune	Gina Carano^{R}						
Morgan Elsbeth	Diana Lee Inosanto				Diana Lee Inosanto		
Frog Lady	Misty Rosas^{R}						
Moff Gideon	Giancarlo Esposito^{R}						
IG-11	Taika Waititi^{R} ^{V}						
Greef Karga	Carl Weathers^{R}						
Elia Kane	Katy O'Brian^{R}						
Kuiil	Nick Nolte^{R} ^{V}						
Peli Motto	Amy Sedaris^{R}	Amy Sedaris^{R}					
Penn Pershing	Omid Abtahi^{R}						
Koska Reeves	Mercedes Varnado^{R}						
Fennec Shand^{LA}	Ming-Na Wen^{R}	Ming-Na Wen					
Carson Teva	Paul Sun-Hyung Lee	Paul Sun-Hyung Lee			Paul Sun-Hyung Lee		
Vane	Marti Matulis^{R}						Marti Matulis
Cobb Vanth	Timothy Olyphant	Timothy Olyphant					
Paz Vizsla	Jon Favreau^{R}	Jon Favreau^{R}					
Governor Wing	Wing T. Chao						
=== Introduced in The Book of Boba Fett ===
Dash		Sophie Thatcher					
Garsa Fwip		Jennifer Beals					
Krrsantan		Carey Jones					
Skad		Jordan Bolger					
Twi'lek Majordomo		David Pasquesi					
=== Introduced in Obi-Wan Kenobi ===
Haja Estree			Kumail Nanjiani				
Tala Durith			Indira Varma				
Lyn Rakish Fourth Sister			Rya Kihlstedt				
Nari			Benny Safdie				
Kawlan Roken			O'Shea Jackson Jr.				
Reva Sevander Third Sister			Moses Ingram				
Sully			Maya Erskine				
=== Introduced in Andor ===
B2EMO				Dave Chapman			
Bix Caleen				Adria Arjona			
Brasso				Joplin Sibtain			
Cinta Kaz				Varada Sethu			
Dedra Meero				Denise Gough			
Kino Loy				Andy Serkis			
Kleya Marki				Elizabeth Dulau			
Luthen Rael				Stellan Skarsgård			
Maarva Andor				Fiona Shaw			
Syril Karn				Kyle Soller			
Vel Sartha				Faye Marsay			
Wilmon Paak				Muhannad Bhaier			
=== Introduced in Ahsoka ===
Aktropaw					Jeryl Prescott Gallien		
Enoch					Wes Chatham		
Shin Hati					Ivanna Sakhno		
Klothow					Claudia Black		
Lakesis					Jane Edwina Seymour		
Marrok First Brother					Paul Darnell		
Baylan Skoll					Ray Stevenson Rory McCann		
=== Introduced in The Acolyte ===
Mog Adana						Harry Trevaldwyn	
Mae Aniseya						Amandla Stenberg Leah Brady^{Y}	
Mother Aniseya						Jodie Turner-Smith	
Osha Aniseya						Amandla Stenberg Lauren Brady^{Y}	
Bazil						Hassan Taj	
Yord Fandar						Charlie Barnett	
Indara						Carrie-Anne Moss	
Kelnacca						Joonas Suotamo	
Mother Koril						Margarita Levieva	
Jecki Lon						Dafne Keen	
Tasi Lowa						Thara Schöön	
Senator Rayencourt						David Harewood	
Vernestra Rwoh						Rebecca Henderson	
Sol						Lee Jung-jae	
The Stranger "Qimir"						Manny Jacinto	
Torbin						Dean-Charles Chapman	
=== Introduced in Skeleton Crew ===
Brutus							Fred Tatasciore^{V}
Fara							Kerry Condon
Fern							Ryan Kiera Armstrong
Gunter							Jaleel White
Jod Na Nawood							Jude Law
KB							Kyriana Kratter
Neel							Robert Timothy Smith
SM-33							Nick Frost^{V}
Wendle							Tunde Adebimpe
Wim							Ravi Cabot-Conyers

== See also ==
- Lists of Star Wars cast members
- List of Star Wars film actors
- Star Wars Holiday Special actors
- Caravan of Courage: An Ewok Adventure actors
- Ewoks: The Battle for Endor actors

== See also ==
- Lists of Star Wars cast members
- List of Star Wars film actors
- Star Wars Holiday Special actors
- Caravan of Courage: An Ewok Adventure actors
- Ewoks: The Battle for Endor actors
