= Natasha Little =

English actress

Natasha Emma Little
- Born: 2 October 1969 (age 56); Liverpool, England
- Occupation: Actress
- Spouse: Bo Poraj (m. 2003)
- Children: 2

Natasha Emma Little (born 2 October 1969) is an English actress. She is best known for her roles as Edith Thompson in the film Another Life, Lady Caroline Langbourne in the BBC miniseries The Night Manager, and Christina Moxam in the BBC miniseries Thirteen. Other credits include Wolf Hall (2015), the Black Mirror episode "Shut Up and Dance" (2016), Absentia (2018-2019), and War of the Worlds (2019–2021).

== Early life ==
Little was born in Liverpool, on 2 October 1969. Her mother was an English language teacher, and her father an NHS manager. For the first decade of her life, she lived in the Middle East, where her father set up immunisation clinics for the WHO. By the time she was 10, she had lived in 11 countries. Her family then moved back to England, and settled in Loughton, Essex. She attended Loughton County High School for Girls, and joined a Saturday drama group called the Epping Youth Theatre. She originally planned on a career in law, but was persuaded to apply to drama school by her teacher after her role in a school production of the musical Chicago. She attended the Guildhall School of Music and Drama, graduating in 1994.

== Career ==
Little's first acting role after graduating was a part in the play The Tenth Man at the New End Theatre. She was talent-spotted whilst performing a play at the Latchmere pub theatre, and subsequently won the role of Jenny in the successful ITV drama London's Burning in 1995. She had roles in Vanity Fair (1998); Cadfael (1998); The Nearly Complete and Utter History of Everything (1999); Man and Boy; Far from the Madding Crowd; Murder in Mind (2003); playing Vicki Westbrook in the spy drama, Spooks (2003); The Crooked Man (2003); Angell's Hell (2005), and playing Lady Hamilton in the Ricky Gervais comedy Extras (2005).

Film credits include The Clandestine Marriage (1999); The Criminal (1999); Kevin & Perry Go Large (2000); Greenfingers (2000); Another Life (2001); Byron (2003); Vanity Fair (2004), in which she played Lady Jane Sheepshanks; The Queen of Sheba's Pearls (2004), and A Congregation of Ghosts 2009) among others.

Theatre roles include Voyage Round My Father; The Vagina Monologues; Les Mains; The Alchemist, and the Richard Eyre play The Novice. Little took her role in The Novice at the last minute. She was originally contracted to star in the film Enigma (2001), but the role was subsequently given to the actress Kate Winslet, who had previously turned the part down due to her pregnancy, but changed her mind. Little was paid her full fee of £300,000, and appeared in The Novice at the Almeida Theatre instead.

Little won the award for Best Actress in a Drama Series at the 1999 Biarritz International Television Festival for her role as Becky Sharp in Vanity Fair, and she also received a nomination for British Academy Television Award for Best Actress for the same role.

She played Ann Shapland in Agatha Christie's Poirot (Cat Among the Pigeons), Megan Hudson in Mistresses, Nemo's mother in Mr. Nobody, Flick in The Boys Are Back, and Allanah Mountstuart in Any Human Heart.

In 2008, Little appeared as a guest star in Foyle's War. In 2011, she portrayed the wife of hostage negotiator Dominic King (played by Trevor Eve) in the three-part drama Kidnap and Ransom, alongside Helen Baxendale. and played Elspeth Munro in the BBC drama Young James Herriot.

In 2013, she appeared in the premiere production of the play Longing. In 2015, she played Liz Cromwell in the BBC production of Wolf Hall. In 2016, she appeared in "Shut Up and Dance", an episode of the anthology series Black Mirror.

In 2018, Little appeared in Birches, a UK based feature based on the novel Silver Birches (published in 2009 by Adrian Plass), which was turned into a film directed by Randall Stevens, with screenplay by Mark Freiburger; it also starred Anna Acton and Todd Carty.

Little appeared in seasons 2 and 3 (during 2018 and 2019) of the Amazon Original Absentia. From 2019 to 2021, she starred alongside Gabriel Byrne and Daisy Edgar-Jones in the British-French production of War of the Worlds.

== Personal life ==
Little lives in the Leytonstone area of London with actor Bo Poraj, whom she married in May 2003. They have two sons.

== Filmography ==
=== Film ===
Year	Title	Role	Notes
1997	Supply & Demand	NCIS – Reception	TV film
1998	Far from the Madding Crowd	Fanny Robin	TV film
1999	The Criminal	Sarah Maitland	
1999	The Clandestine Marriage	Fanny	
1999	The Nearly Complete and Utter History of Everything	Lady Lionbrain	TV film
2000	Kevin & Perry Go Large	Anne Boleyn	
2000	Greenfingers	Primrose Woodhouse	
2001	Another Life	Edith Jessie Thompson	
2001	The Island of the Mapmaker's Wife	Finley Descotes	
2002	Man and Boy	Gina Silver	TV film
2003	Byron	Augusta Leigh	TV film
2003	The Crooked Man	Lisa Talbot	TV film
2004	Vanity Fair	Lady Jane Sheepshanks Crawley	
2004	The Queen of Sheba's Pearls	Peggy Pretty	
2005	Angell's Hell	Lucy	TV film
2009	Mr. Nobody	Mother Nemo	
2009	The Boys Are Back	Flick	
2009	A Congregation of Ghosts	Daphne du Maurier	
2012	We'll Take Manhattan	Peggy Shrimpton	TV film
2012	Blood	Lily Fairburn	
2013	Welcome to the Punch	Jane Badham	
2016	Una	Yvonne	
2019	Birches	Angela	
2020	The Bet	Isabel	
2020	Getting to Know You	Abby	

=== Television ===
Year	Title	Role	Notes
1994	Between the Lines	Shipping Office Clerk	Episode: "The End User: Part II"
1995–1996	London's Burning	Jenny	Recurring role, 11 episodes
1997	This Life	Rachel	Series regular, 20 episodes
1998	Big Women	Saffron	Episode: "Well, I'm Sorry"
1998	Vanity Fair	Becky Sharp	Mini-series – main role – 6 episodes
1998	Cadfael	Melangell	Episode: "The Pilgrim of Hate"
1998	The Bill	Claire	Episode: "Bad Feelings"
1999	Love in the 21st Century	Amanda	Episode: "Masturbation"
2002	Dickens	Ellen Ternan	Mini-series
2003	Murder in Mind	Hat Vezey	Episode: "Stalkers"
2003	Spooks	Vicki Westbrook	Recurring role, 5 episodes
2005	Extras	Lady Hamilton	Episode: "Ross Kemp & Vinnie Jones"
2007	Silent Witness	Alice Huston	Episode: "Hippocratic Oath"
2008	Foyle's War	Rose Dawson	Episode: "Broken Souls"
2008	Agatha Christie's Poirot	Ann Shapland	Episode: "Cat Among the Pigeons"
2009	Mistresses	Megan Hudson	Series 2 regular, 6 episodes
2009	The Bill	Ms. Stephanie Anderson	Episode: "Conviction: Judgment Day"
2010	Any Human Heart	Allanah Mountstuart	Mini-series
2011	New Tricks	Sarah Winslow	Episode: "Old Fossils"
2011	Young James Herriot	Mrs. Munro	Mini-series – 3 episodes
2011–2012	Kidnap and Ransom	Sophie King	Series regular – 6 episodes
2011–2013	Case Histories	Julia Land	Recurring role, 5 episodes
2013	Moving On	Sonia	Episode: "Friends Like These"
2013	Breathless	Elizabeth Powell	Mini-series
2014	Masterpiece Mystery		Episode: "Breathless, Part 1"
2015	Father Brown	Harriet Greensleeves	Episode: "The Owl of Minerva"
2015	Wolf Hall	Liz Cromwell	Mini-series – 3 episodes
2015	DCI Banks	Elaine Foster	Episode: "Ghosts"
2016	Thirteen	Christina Moxam	Main role – 5 episodes
2016	The Night Manager	Caroline Langbourne	Mini-series – 4 episodes
2016	Black Mirror	Karen	Episode: "Shut Up and Dance"
2017	Death in Paradise	Victoria Baker	Episode: "Erupting in Murder"
2017	Midsomer Murders	Melody Henderson	Episode: "Last Man Out"
2018	Silent Witness	Zoe McMorris	Episode: "Family"
2018	Press	Sarah Allen	Mini-series – 3 episodes
2019–2020	Absentia	Special Agent Julianne Gunnarsen	Main role – 20 episodes
2019–2021	War of the Worlds	Sarah Gresham	Main role – 16 episodes
2021	Dalgliesh	Matron Mary Taylor	Episode: "Shroud for a Nightingale"
2021	Ragdoll	Andrea Wyld	5 episodes
2022	Ten Percent	Charlotte Nightingale	Main role – 8 episodes

=== Video games ===
Year	Title	Role	Notes
2009	Dragon Age: Origins	Nan/Lady Landra/Redcliffe Priest	Voice only
2010	Dragon Age: Origins – Awakening	Mistress Woolsey/Ser Rylock/Amaranthine Guards	Voice only
2011	Dragon Age II	Janeka/Chateau Haine Party Guest	Voice only
2011	Star Wars: The Old Republic	Sith Warrior (Female)	Voice only
2012	007 Legends	Pussy Galore	Voice only
2013	Star Wars: The Old Republic – Rise of the Hutt Cartel	Sith Warrior (Female)	Voice only
2014	Star Wars: The Old Republic – Shadow of Revan	Sith Warrior (Female)/Imperial Scout	Voice only
2015	Star Wars: The Old Republic – Knights of the Fallen Empire	Sith Warrior	Voice only
2016	Star Wars: The Old Republic – Knights of the Eternal Throne	Sith Warrior (Female)	Voice only
2017	Total War: Warhammer II	Morathi the Hag Sorceress	Voice only
2018	Vampyr	Beatrice/Carolyn/Doris	Voice only
2019	Blood & Truth	Anne Marks	Voice only
2019	Star Wars: The Old Republic – Onslaught	Sith Warrior (Female)	Voice only

=== Theatre ===
Year	Title	Role	Venue	Notes
1994	My Favorite Year		Guildhall School of Music and Drama, London	
1994	The Tenth Man	Thérèse	Hampstead Theatre, London	
1996	The Alchemist	Doll Common	Birmingham Repertory Theatre, Birmingham & Royal National Theatre, London	Understudy to Josie Lawrence
2000	The Novice	Jessica	Almeida Theatre, London	
2003	The Vagina Monologues	—N/a	Arts Theatre, London	
2006	A Voyage Round My Father	Elizabeth	Donmar Warehouse, London & Wyndham's Theatre, London	
2013	Longing	Tania	Hampstead Theatre, London	
2018	Again	Louise	Trafalgar Theatre, London	

== Awards and nominations ==
Year	Award	Category	Work	Result	Ref.
1999	BAFTA Television Awards	BAFTA TV Best Actress	Vanity Fair	Nominated	
1999	FIPADOC Awards	Best Actress in TV Series and Serials	Vanity Fair	Won	
1999	RTS Television Awards	Best Actress	Vanity Fair	Nominated	
2002	Cherbourg-Octeville Festival of Irish & British Film	Best Actress	Another Life	Won	
