= Cusset (disambiguation) =

Cusset is a commune in the department of Allier, Auvergne, France.

Cusset may also refer to:

== Places ==
- Canton of Cusset, an administrative division of Allier, Auvergne, France
  - Canton of Cusset-Nord, a former administrative division of Allier, Auvergne, France
  - Canton of Cusset-Sud, a former administrative division of Allier, Auvergne, France

== People ==
- Catherine Cusset (born 1963), French novelist
- François Cusset (born 1969), French writer, historian, and professor

== See also ==
- Cusseta (disambiguation)
