= Canton of Cusset-Nord =

Former canton in Auvergne-Rhône-Alpes, France

Coordinates: 46°08′07″N 3°27′26″E

Cusset-Nord
- Former canton
- Interactive map of Cusset-Nord
- Country: France
- Region: Auvergne-Rhône-Alpes
- Department: Allier
- No. of communes: {{{nbcomm}}}
- Disbanded: 2015
- Population (2012): 13,458

The canton of Cusset-Nord is a French former administrative division in the department of Allier and region Auvergne. It was disbanded following the French canton reorganisation which came into effect in March 2015. It consisted of 4 communes, which joined the new canton of Cusset in 2015. Its chef-lieu was Cusset. The canton was established in 1985. It had 13,458 inhabitants (2012).

== Geography ==
The canton comprised the following communes:

- Bost
- Creuzier-le-Neuf
- Creuzier-le-Vieux
- Cusset (partly)

The fraction of the town of Cusset was defined by "Avenue de Vichy (from the territorial boundary of Vichy), a footpath between Castle Presle and the center of Vichy Cusset education (up to Rue d'Anjou), Rue d'Anjou (to the pedestrian path leading to the water tower), footpath leading to the castle water (up Avenue de Vichy), Avenue de Vichy, Rue de la République, boulevard du General de Gaulle, Place Victor Hugo, Place Radoult-de-Lafosse, Rue Rocher-Fayvé, Place Félix-Cornil, Cours La Fayette, Rue de la Barge, Route de Ferrières, communal way #2 (to chemin des Vignes), Chemin des Vignes, Rue des Tuileries, Chemin de Meunière and Jolan river (up to the limit of the common Molles)."

== History ==
The canton was established in 1985 by splitting the canton of Cusset into two new: Cusset-Nord and Cusset-Sud.

Due to the redrawing of cantons of the Allier department in 2015, this canton was absorbed into the new canton of Cusset, which includes the southern part of the commune of Cusset that was previously part of the canton of Cusset-Sud.

== Administration ==
List of successive general Councillors:

- 1985–1986 (invalidated): Jean-François Hamaide, RPR
- 1986–1992: René Bardet, PCF
- 1992–1993: Joseph Bléthon, DVD, Doctor-veterinary
- 1994–2013 (death): René Bardet, PCF, Mayor of Cusset (2001–2013) and first vice-president of agglomeration community of Vichy
- 2013–2015: Magali Dubreuil, EELV, Coordinator of the service Childhood in the agglomeration community of Vichy Val d'Allier and former municipal councilor of Cusset
