= Huntingdon College =

Methodist college in Montgomery, Alabama, US

- Former names: Tuskegee Female College (1854–1872); Alabama Conference Female College (1872–1910); Woman's College of Alabama (1910–1935)
- Motto: Enter to Grow in Wisdom, Go Forth to Apply Wisdom in Service.
- Type: Private college
- Established: February 2, 1854; 172 years ago
- Religious affiliation: United Methodist Church
- President: Anthony Leigh
- Faculty: 58
- Students: 1,107
- Location: Montgomery, Alabama, U.S. 32.350°N 86.285°W
- Campus: Suburban Neighborhood
- Colors: Scarlet & grey
- Sporting affiliations: NCAA Division III
- Mascot: Hawks
- Website: huntingdon.edu
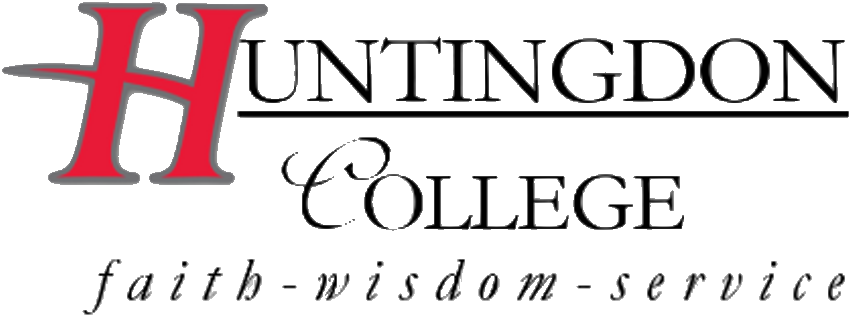
- Huntingdon College Campus Historic District
- U.S. National Register of Historic Places
- U.S. Historic district
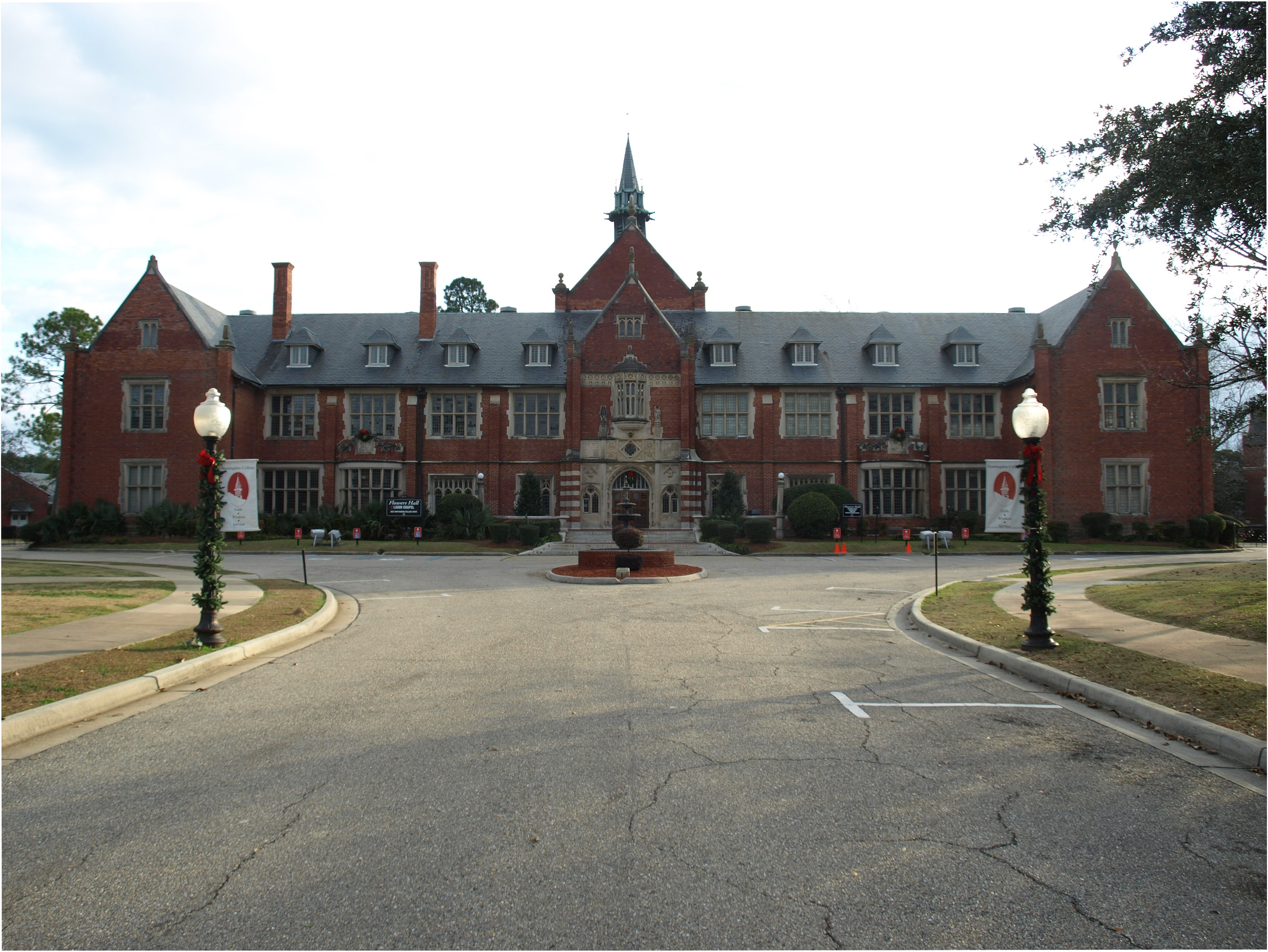
- Flowers Memorial Hall was built in 1909
- Area: 58 acres (23 ha)
- Architectural style: Late Gothic Revival, Tudor Revival
- NRHP reference No.: 00000138
- Added to NRHP: February 24, 2000

Huntingdon College is a private Methodist college in Montgomery, Alabama. Founded in 1854 as Tuskegee Female College, it originally operated as a women's institutions and was later affiliated with the Methodist Episcopal Church, South. The college relocated to Montgomery in 1909 and adopted its current name in 1935, and transitioned to a coeducational institution.

== History ==
Huntingdon College was chartered on February 2, 1854, as "Tuskegee Female College" by the Alabama State Legislature and Governor John A. Winston. The first president was Andrew Adgate Lipscomb. Lipscomb laid the foundation of the college as a teaching college rather than a research institution.

In 1872 the name was changed to "Alabama Conference Female College", as the college came under the auspices of the Methodist Episcopal Church, South. As the college and the South struggled to rebuild following the Civil War, college leaders believed they needed to relocate the institution to a more populous city, and they chose the state's capital, Montgomery.

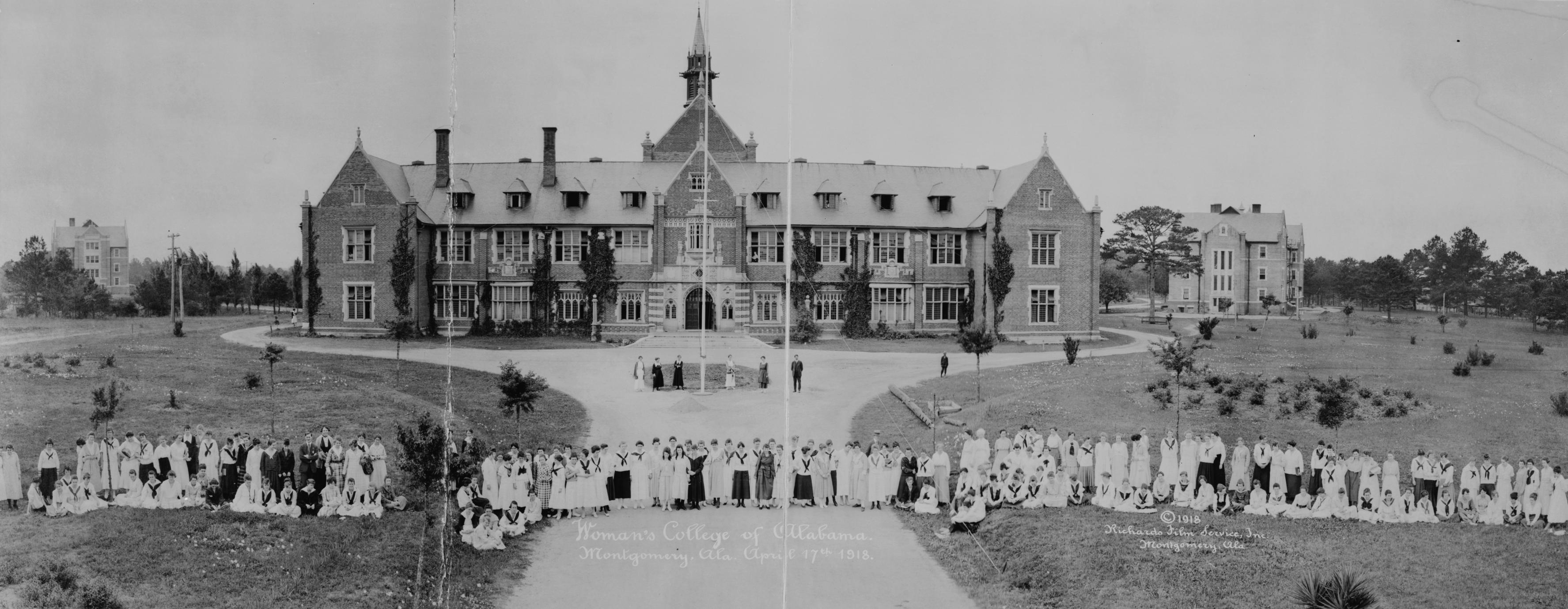
Woman's College of Alabama in 1918

In 1908, they purchased a 58-acre (23 ha) parcel of land on what was then the outskirts of town; it is now part of the Old Cloverdale neighborhood of Montgomery. The campus landscaping was designed by Frederick Law Olmsted Jr., who had also planned the Biltmore Estate and Central Park. The college moved all of its furniture, lab chemicals, and records into Hamner Hall in Montgomery on August 24, 1909. The building burned to the ground that night, destroying the records of the college's first 50 years and all of its furnishings. The students and President William Martin moved to Sullins College in Virginia for that school year, and construction continued on the college's first building, John Jefferson Flowers Memorial Hall. In 1910, the school was renamed as the "Woman's College of Alabama". Completed that same year and designed by Harvard architect H. Langford Warren, Flowers Hall was designed to emulate the collegiate Gothic architecture of Oxford and Cambridge universities in England, and of Harvard University in Cambridge, Massachusetts. It set the tone that was followed for the architectural style of the campus.

The college admitted its first male students in the aftermath of World War I, graduating the first male student in 1934. Realizing that the name Woman's College of Alabama no longer fit its student body, the college was renamed in 1935 as Huntingdon College in honor of Selina, Countess of Huntingdon, a notable supporter of John Wesley and of Methodism.

In the early 21st century, Huntingdon offers more than 50 undergraduate programs of study and 18 NCAA-III intercollegiate athletic teams that participate in the USA South Athletic Conference. Between 2002 and 2012, enrollment increased by 53% in the traditional day program and 88% overall (594 to 1118). The Chronicle of Higher Education listed Huntingdon in 2014 among the "Fastest Growing Colleges in America."

Anthony Leigh was appointed the 15th president of Huntingdon College in 2024, assuming the role on October 3, 2025, following the tenure of J. Cameron West.

== Campus ==
Huntingdon's campus is listed on the National Register of Historic Places as the Huntingdon College Campus Historic District. The district contains thirteen contributing buildings, built in the Gothic Revival and Tudor Revival styles, and one site. The district was placed on the NRHP on February 24, 2000. The college expanded across Fairview Avenue, adding the Cloverdale Campus in 2001.

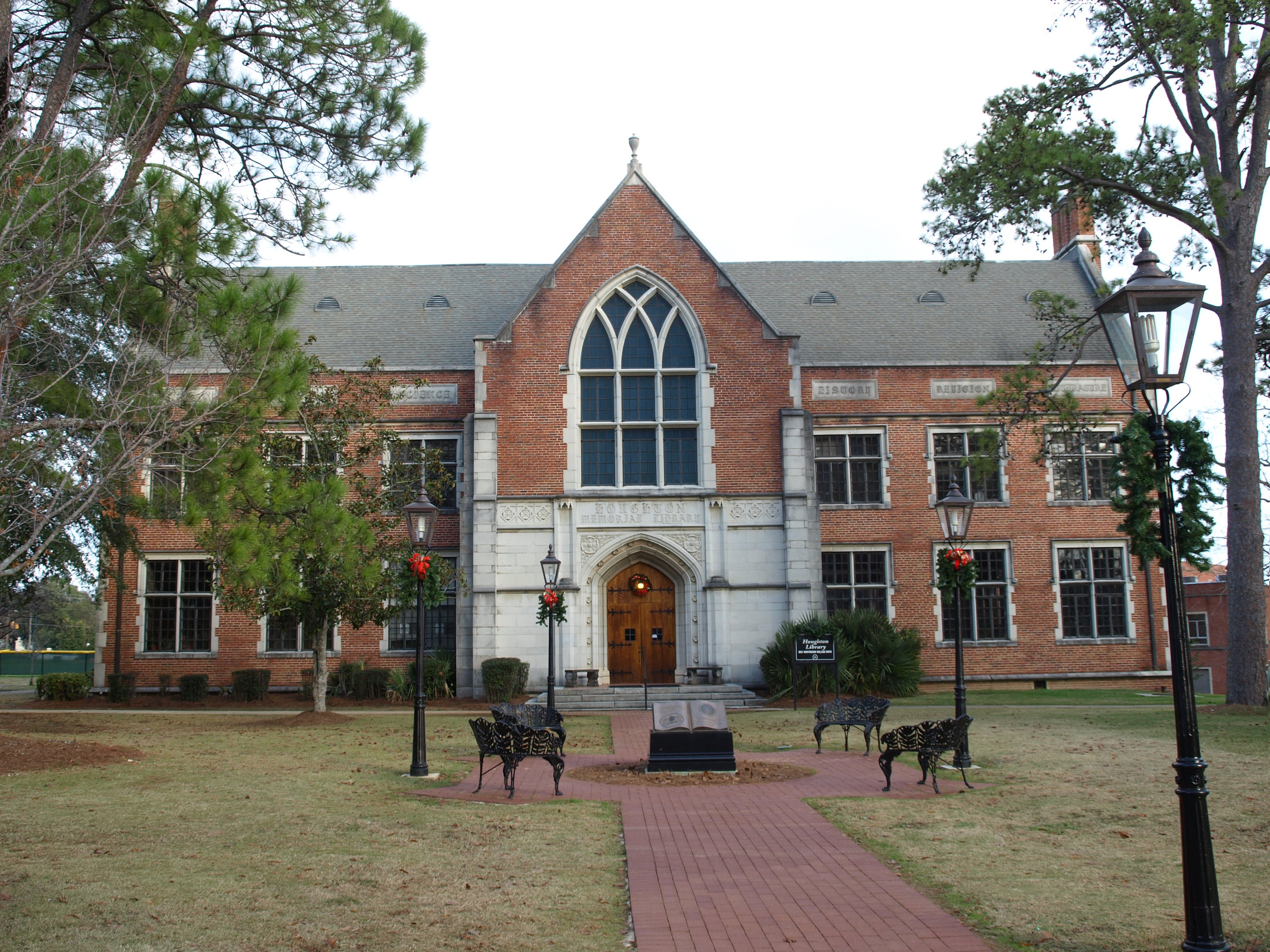
Houghton Memorial Library

== Athletics ==
Huntingdon College teams participate as a member of the National Collegiate Athletic Association's Division III. The Hawks are members of the Collegiate Conference of the South (CCS), formed in July 2022 by an amicable split of the USA South Athletic Conference. Men's sports include baseball, basketball, cross country, football, golf, lacrosse, soccer, tennis and wrestling; while women's sports include basketball, beach volleyball, cross country, golf, lacrosse, soccer, softball, tennis, and volleyball. Huntingdon is the only four-year college in the state of Alabama to offer collegiate wrestling. With the CCS not sponsoring football, women's golf, or lacrosse for either sex, Huntingdon remains in the USA South for those sports.

== The "Red Lady" ==
Huntingdon College is the home of the "Red Lady." She is alleged to be the ghost of a female student from the early twentieth century who took her life inside her room in Pratt Hall.

== Notable alumni ==
Notable Huntingdon alumni include:

- Louise Branscomb, physician and surgeon
- Leura Canary (1978), former U.S. Attorney
- Kristi Dubose (1986), U.S. District Court Judge
- Joe Durant (1987), professional golfer
- Leila Herbert, author
- Elizabeth Hight (1977), career US Navy, Rear admiral
- Harper Lee (1944-1945), Novelist
- Emily Hendree Stewart Park (1848-1910), president of the Washington Seminary (Atlanta)
- Jeff Sessions (1969), attorney and politician, U.S. Senator and U.S. Attorney General
- Maria Howard Weeden, painter and poet
- Kathryn Tucker Windham (1939), writer
- Bob Zellner (1957-1961), Civil Rights activist
