= Washington Seminary =

Washington Seminary may refer to:

- Washington Seminary (Atlanta) an independent K-12 school in Atlanta, Georgia, from 1878-1953
- Washington Female Seminary, a Presbyterian seminary for women in Washington, Pennsylvania
- Claverack College, a coeducational boarding school also known as Washington Seminary
- Washington Seminary, the former name of Gonzaga College High School
