= Cusseta =

Cusseta may refer to a place in the United States:

- Cusseta, Creek Nation, a Muscogee Creek peace town formerly located in Georgia
- Cusseta, Alabama
- Cusseta, Georgia
- Fort Cusseta
