= Générations Star Wars et Science Fiction =

Star Wars fan convention in Cusset, France

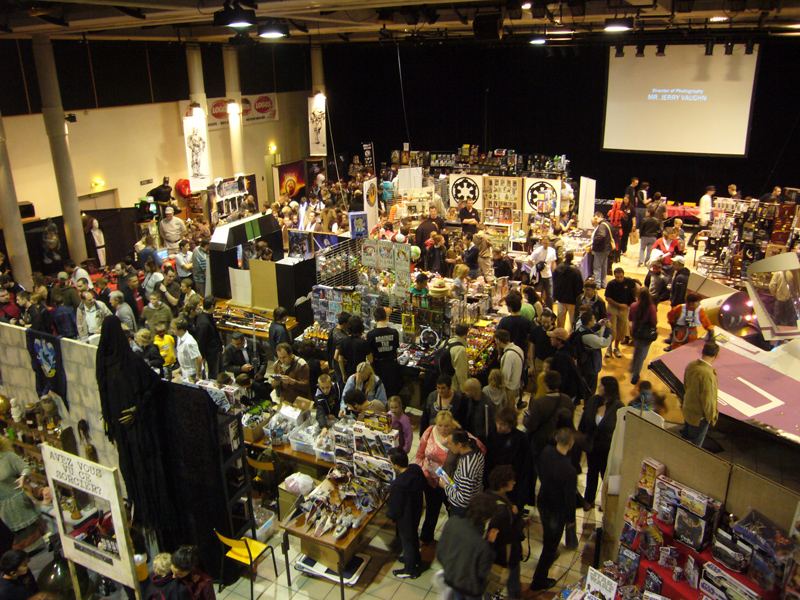
- View of the convention in 2010.
- Status: Active
- Genre: Star Wars
- Venue: Espace Chambon
- Locations: Cusset, Allier
- Coordinates: 46°07′48.59″N 3°27′33.32″E
- Country: France
- Inaugurated: 1999
- Attendance: Around 6,500 in 2014
- Organizer: Les Héritiers de la Force
- Filing status: Non-profit
- Website: www.genstarwars.com

Générations Star Wars et Science Fiction (English: Star Wars and science fiction generations), also called Gen SW, is a French fan convention whose main subject is the Star Wars universe. Other topics are the comics, the science fiction and the fantasy. It is held once a year in Cusset, Allier since 1999. Among its most notable guests are the major Star Wars actors Anthony Daniels (C-3PO), Peter Mayhew (Chewbacca), Jake Lloyd (Anakin Skywalker) and David Prowse (Darth Vader) or renowned comics artists like Tom Palmer and Davide Fabbri.

Organizing this event is the main activity of the non-profit association Les Héritiers de la Force (English: The Heirs of the Force) which is not associated to nor endorsed by Lucasfilm Ltd. There is no entry fee for the visitors attending the convention.

== History ==
The first venue of the Générations Star Wars et Science Fiction occurred on October 10, 1999 and hosted 500 visitors. It's only in 2002, for the fourth edition, that the convention switched to its current format, a two-days event held on a week-end as close as possible to the French public holiday of May 1.

In 2003, the convention welcomed Jeremy Bulloch, the actor behind the bounty hunter Boba Fett. Since then, it ever hosted at least one Star Wars actor, except in 2007 when health problems forced Kenny Baker to cancel his visit. Comics artists are also mainstays since the coming of Italian artist Davide Fabbri in 2009, mainly with the help of Star Wars comics publisher in France, Delcourt. These guests, among others like stunt coordinator Nick Gillard or photographer Cédric Delsaux, helped the convention to grow up and attract more visitors, until the current record of 6500 attendees in 2014.

== Activities ==
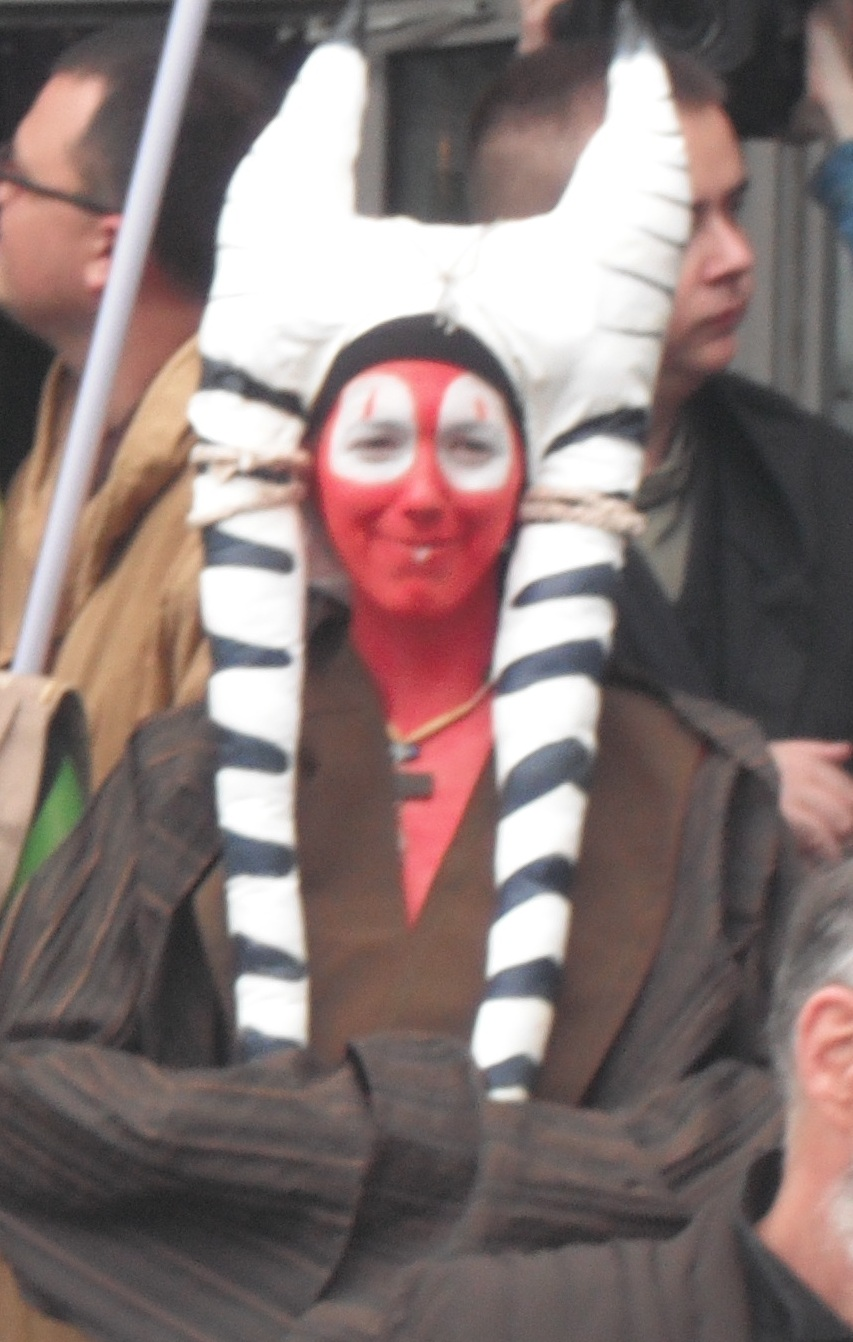
Shaak Ti cosplay during the 2014 convention.

The visitors are able to meet the actors and artists, ask them questions, obtain signings or take photos with them. There are also exhibitions, dioramas and merchandising shops. Sci-Fi fans associations present their activities and what they've created like real scale objects or vehicles. The main events regularly happening are cosplay contests, knowledges quizzes, fan art contests, Questions/Answers with the guests or conferences. Since 2013, charity sales are organized on the favour of the children service of Vichy's hospital.

== Organizers ==
The event is organized by the non-profit association Les Héritiers de la Force, based at Cusset. It is the association's main activity but its members also participate at other events or conventions, to promote Générations Star Wars or as cosplayers. They also go to hospitals to help the ill children.

The convention's posters are quite famous among the French Star Wars fandom because of the artworks of painter from Vichy Greg Massonneau.

The association, and thus the event, are supported by the General Council of Allier and the city of Cusset. There are also partnerships with comics publisher Delcourt and toy manufacturers Lego and Hasbro, for example.

== Guests list ==
Here is the complete list of the convention's guests, up to the 2014 edition.

=== Star Wars actors ===
Name	Years		Played in						
Name	First	Others	Main character	Ep. I	Ep. II	Ep. III	Ep. IV	Ep. V	Ep. VI
Jeremy Bulloch	2003	2014	Boba Fett					X	X
Mike Edmonds	2004		Logray						X
Garrick Hagon	2004		Biggs Darklighter				X		
Richard LeParmentier	2005	2010	Conan Antonio Motti				X		
Anthony Daniels	2006		C-3PO	X	X	X	X	X	X
Peter Mayhew	2008		Chewbacca			X	X	X	X
Daniel Logan	2009		Boba Fett		X				
Kenneth Colley	2010		Firmus Piett					X	X
Julian Glover	2010		Maximilian Veers					X	
Jake Lloyd	2011		Anakin Skywalker	X					
Paul Blake	2012		Greedo				X		
Alan Harris	2013		Bossk					X	X
Chris Parsons	2013		4-LOM					X	
Dave Prowse	2013		Darth Vader				X	X	X
Dermot Crowley	2014		Crix Madine						X
Cathy Munroe	2014		Zuckuss					X	

=== Comics authors ===
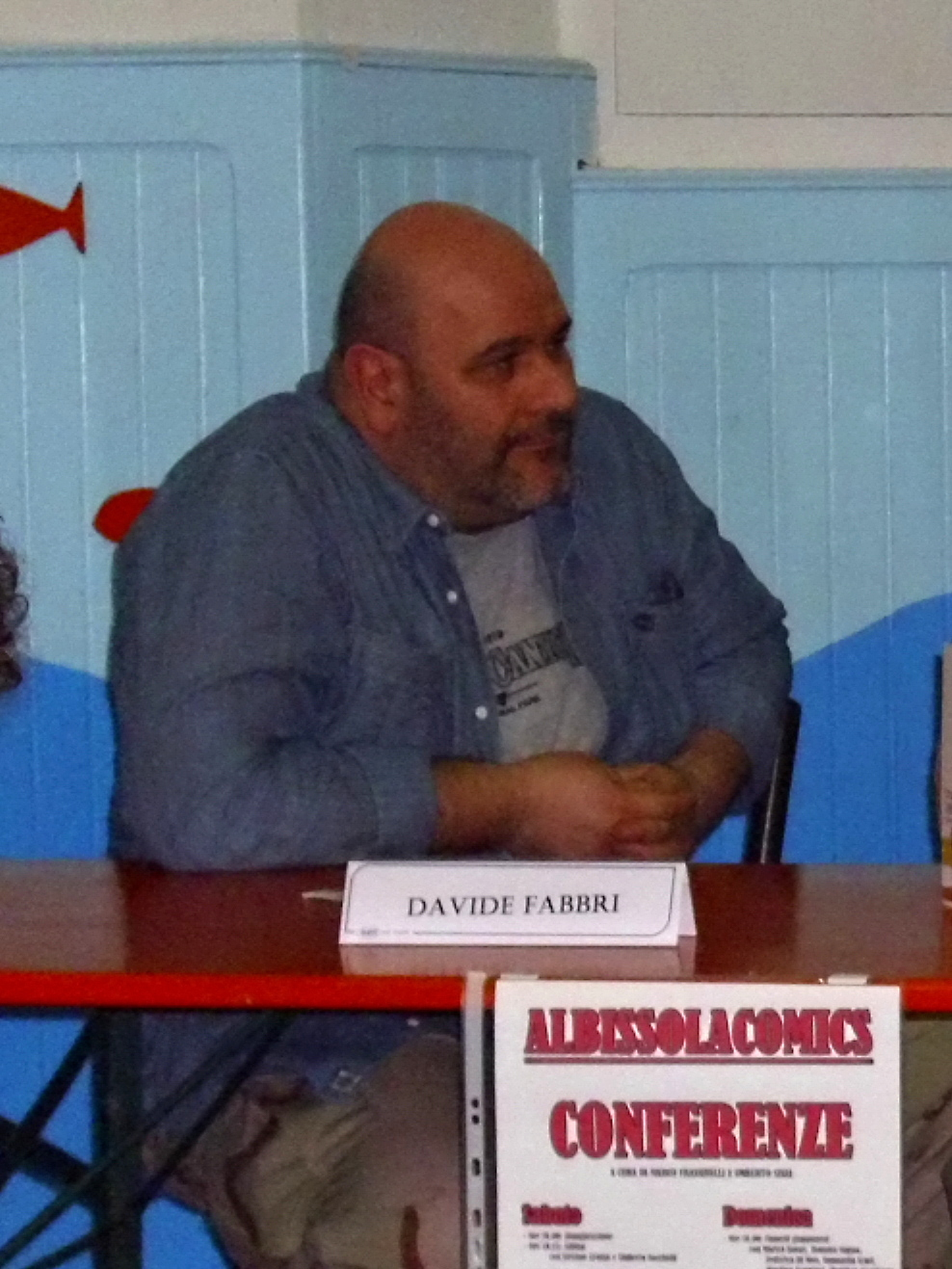
Davide Fabbri at Albissola Comics 2014.

Name	Years		Star Wars Comics
Name	First	Others	Star Wars Comics
Davide Fabbri	2009		Agent de l'Empire, Empire, Infinities
Benjamin Carré	2010		Dark Times, Knights of the Old Republic
Thomas Frisano	2010	2011, 2013	French covers
Jérôme Alquié	2011		No
Doug Wheatley	2011		Dark Times, Empire
Stéphane Créty	2012		Agent of the Empire, Star Wars
Christophe Hénin	2012	2013, 2014	No
Julien Hugonnard-Bert	2012	2014	Agent of the Empire, Star Wars
Thierry Vivien	2012	2013	Parody
Patrick Biesse	2013	2014	No
Tom Palmer	2013		Star Wars Comics Collector
Simon Caruso	2014		No
Tomás Giorello	2014		X-Wing Rogue Squadron, Empire
Guillaume Griffon	2014		No

=== Other guests ===
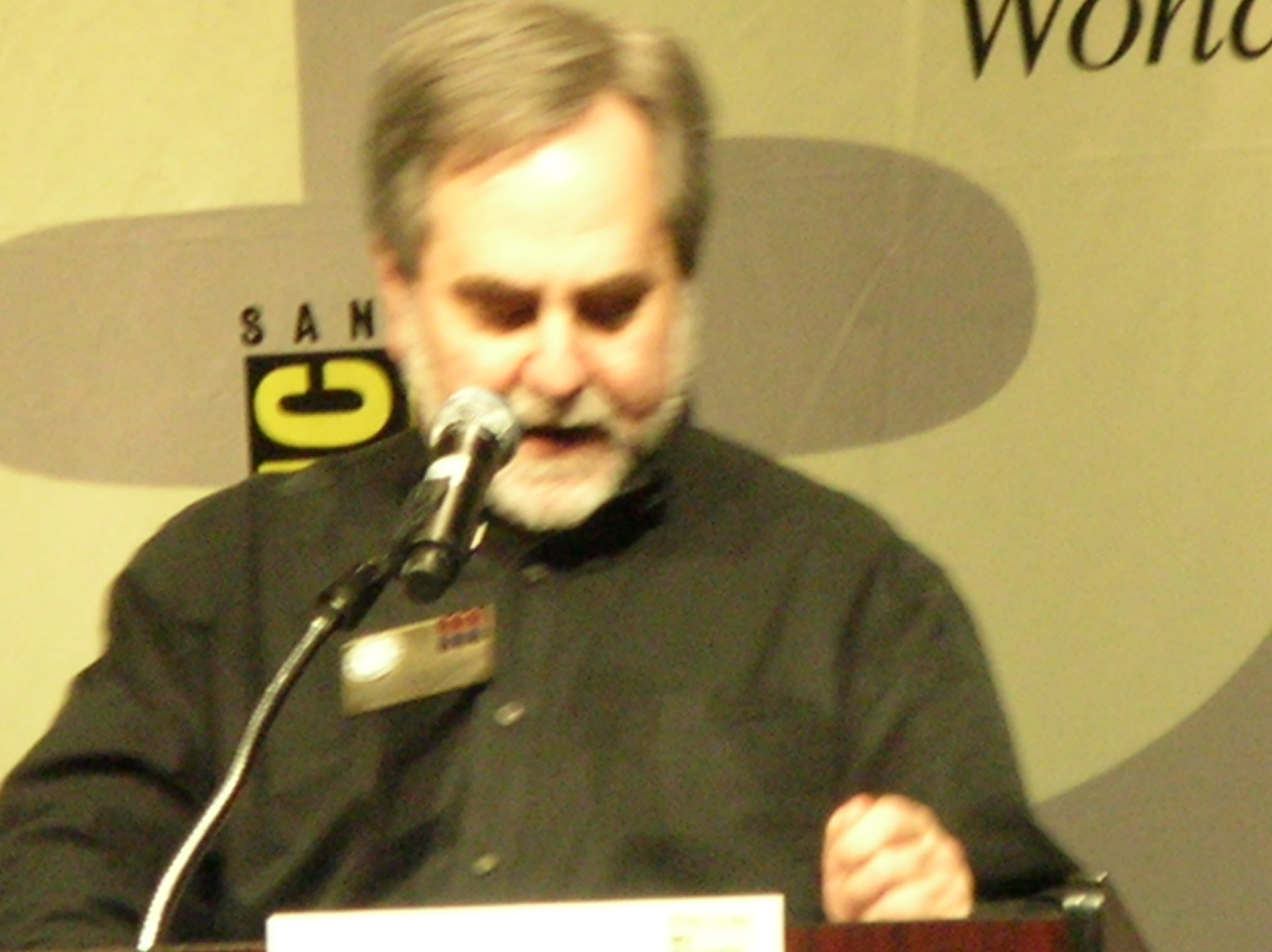
Steve Sansweet at WonderCon 2009.

Name	Years		Reason
Name	First	Others	Reason
Fabrice Labrousse	2007		Star Wars related book author.
Francis Schall	2007		Star Wars related book author.
Cédric Delsaux	2009	2012	Photographer and Star Wars related book author.
Thierry Mornet	2009 to 2014		Responsible of comics range for Delcourt and comics writer.
Steve Sansweet	2011		Director of Content Management and Head of Fan Relations of Lucasfilm Ltd and Star Wars related books author.
Nick Gillard	2012		Stunt coordinator on Star Wars prequel trilogy.
Stéfan Ledu	2012		Photographer.
Stéphane Faucourt	2014		Star Wars related book author.
Patrice Girod	2014		Editor-in-chief of Lucasfilm Magazine.
Sébastien "Kosept" Lasnon	2014		Graphic designer and illustrator.

== See also ==
- Cusset
- Science fiction fandom
- Star Wars
- Star Wars comics
- Lego Star Wars
