= Emily Hendree Stewart Park =

American school president (1848–1910)

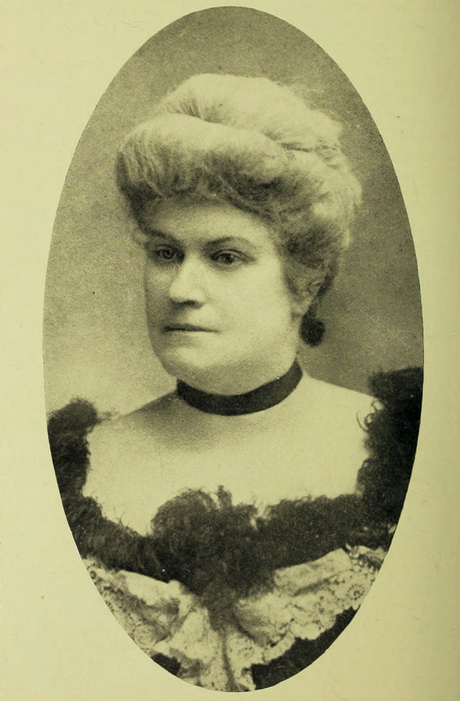
Park in 1911

Emily Hendree Stewart Park (née Hendree; after first marriage, Stewart; after second marriage, Park; 1848-1910) was a school administrator. She served as President of the Washington Seminary in Atlanta, Georgia. Also active in civic affairs, Park served as State Regent and Vice President General of the National Society of the Daughters of the American Revolution (DAR), as Vice President of the Georgia Division of the United Daughters of the Confederacy (UDC), and as State Regent of the Confederate Memorial Museum at Richmond, Virginia.

== Early life and education ==
Emily Hendree was born at Cusseta, Alabama, on March 31, 1848. She was the daughter of Dr. George R. Hendree, of Richmond, Virginia, and Cornelia Paine, of Watkinsville, Georgia. Emily had at least two sisters, Mrs. Z. D. Harrison and Mrs. L. W. Burton.

Park's childhood and youth were passed in Tuskegee, Alabama, where at the Methodist college (now Huntingdon College) she received her early education.

== Career ==
In 1870, she married Baylor Roberts Stewart in Huntsville, Alabama. In 1883, as a widow at the age of 35, she began the educational work, which was her vocation. She purchased Washington Seminary in Atlanta and became its President. It grew under her direction and improved rapidly. She managed it several years. It was while there that she became prominent in women's affairs throughout the South. She also took a prominent part in movements looking to the advancement of education and religion.

In 1890, she spent a year in travel and study abroad. Upon her return, she married Capt. Robert Emory Park, of Macon, Georgia, and sold the Washington seminary.

In January 1896, a few women, in response to notes from Mrs. Park, met at her house in Macon to organize a Chapter of the UDC. Twenty-two names had been sent in as charter members, but on account of the weather only four were present. At Park's suggestion, the Chapter was named for Sidney Lanier, who was a soldier as well as a poet. Park declined the nomination for President because of the work devolving upon her as State Regent of the Confederate Museum at Richmond, which office she continued to hold till death. The Sidney Lanier Chapter UDC chose as its first work the Georgia room in the museum, and it was through Park's efforts that the collection of Mrs. DeRenne, of Savannah, Georgia was secured.

In 1900, the election of Captain Park to the office of State treasurer changed their residence to Atlanta. From the day of her return to Atlanta, she became increasingly a power in the social, philanthropic, patriotic, and religious life of that city. Widowed again in 1909, and physically ill, she never recovered from the shock of Capt. Park's death.

== Death ==
After being stricken with paralysis, Emily Park died ten days later in Atlanta, Georgia, September 9, 1910,
