= Benposta =

Spanish charitable organization

Benposta (from the Galician words ben and posta, meaning "well set"), known in Spanish as "Ciudad de los Muchachos" (City of Youth), is a communal charitable organization for troubled youth. Benpostas are places for abandoned, marginalized youth around the world. Each Benposta has its own parliament and administrative and political positions like mayor, counselor, etc.

== History ==
The concept, and first city, of Benposta was founded by Father Jesús Silva in 1956. The first City of Benposta was founded in Seixalbo, outside of Ourense, Galicia, Spain.

Benposta was designed as a peaceful and safe home for homeless children, particularly those affected by poverty or violence. Commonly known as "The City of Youth", Benposta cities originally had no adult residents, other than Father Silva. The city was governed and maintained completely by the children.

Since its inception, Benposta cities have opened around the world. Some Benposta cities now include adults as residents, many of whom have grown up in Benposta. The adults in Benposta have identical rights to the children, they are not superior, and do not function as guardians.

== Ideology ==
The aim of Benposta cities is to promote health and development, by respecting and promoting each child's rights. In Benposta cities, all residents are considered equal citizens, and given identical rights.

All residents participate in the community - in decision making, organising, and in completing tasks to maintain the community.

Benposta is founded on an independent ideology with strong Catholic foundations. While it is commonly known as a charity for street children, the homeless and the underprivileged, its founder, Father Silva, claims his real motivations were to create an educational community where children would be the new citizens of a world based in Christian principles.

Benposta's message of peace is a prayer against violence, war, poverty, and injustice. It begins, We are the youth of the earth; we go around the world with our hands united, and ends with the sentence, If all men in the world would pray together before God, the world would be a star of Peace, Justice and Love.

Even with an ideology strongly based in Christian Catholic principles, the City of Youth has the only Muslim mosque in Ourense, and states that any religious beliefs must be respected; therefore, Benposta accepts children of every religion.

== Structure ==
The Benposta cities around the world vary in structure, however the central principles remain the same. Central to all Benposta cities is the equality of residents. Every resident is considered a citizen of Benposta, even the youngest children. All citizens have equal rights and responsibilities.

The fundamental principle of Benposta is that all residents are treated as equals. Each Benposta had a government or council, elected by every member of the community, even the youngest children. The council makes all the decisions regarding the maintenance of the community.

Tasks within the community are performed by the citizens. These tasks include cleaning, making furniture, tending to the garden, and working in the kitchen.

== Los Muchachos Revolutionary Circus ==
In 1966 Benposta opened the School of Acrobatic and Circus Arts, where children and teenagers from all over the world were trained to perform in the new circus called Los Muchachos or Circo de Los Muchachos. From the beginning the circus was the way Benposta used to spread its message around the world. The harlequin tower is the best known number where "the strongest [are] below, the weak above and the child at the top."

The first performance was held in Plaça Catalunya in Barcelona in 1966. From there it toured in Portugal and all around Spain. In 1970 in France, Los Muchachos was the first circus to ever perform in the Grand Palais of Paris. It also toured in Belgium and the Netherlands. In 1973 Los Muchachos opened in America at Madison Square Gardens, New York City, and toured other major U.S. cities like Los Angeles, Las Vegas, Philadelphia, and others. The rest of the decade was spent making two complete tours around South America including the major capital cities, then Asia and Australia. The decade of the 1980s began with a new show performed in Israel and then all around Europe. Los Muchachos had special tours in Germany where the ideology of Benposta was widely known to the people through books and film.

In 1980 they appear as artists prohibited by the Argentine dictatorship https://web.archive.org/web/20131126001034/http://www.mindef.gov.ar/noticias/lista1980.pdf

In 1991 Los Muchachos celebrated its 25th anniversary performing in Plaça de Catalunya in Barcelona. Today Los Muchachos circus has a permanent polyhedron tent in Benposta, Seixalbo, Ourense.

== See also ==
- Boys Town (organization) – Nonprofit organization based in US
