= The Westminster Schools =

Private school in Atlanta, Georgia, US

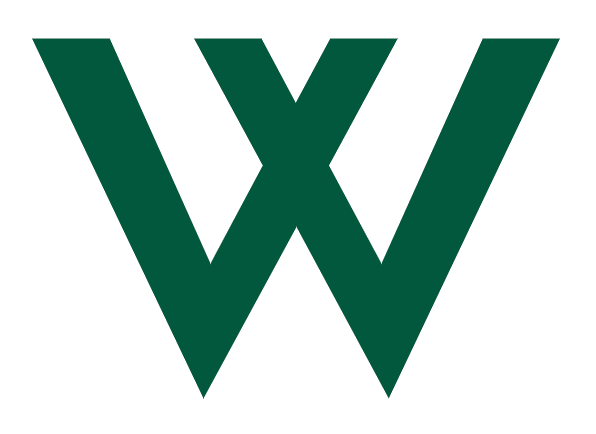

Location
- 1424 West Paces Ferry Road, NW (Buckhead); Atlanta, Georgia 30327; United States; 33°50′39″N 84°26′10″W

Information
- School type: Private school
- Motto: And Jesus grew in wisdom and stature, and favor with God and man (Luke 2:52)
- Religious affiliation: Christian
- Established: 1951; traces origins to 1878
- Founder: William L. Pressly
- President: Jay Rainey
- Teaching staff: 277.4
- Grades: Kindergarten through 12
- Enrollment: 1,879 (2023-2024)
- Student to teacher ratio: 6.8
- Campus size: 180 acres
- Campus type: Suburban
- Colors: Forest green and white
- Athletics conference: GHSA Region 5-AAAA
- Nickname: Wildcats
- Accreditation: Southern Association of Independent Schools
- Newspaper: The Westminster Bi-Line
- Yearbook: Lynx
- Endowment: $306 million
- Website: westminster.net

The Westminster Schools is a Kindergarten–12 private school in Atlanta, Georgia, United States, founded in 1951.

== History ==
Westminster originated in 1951 as a reorganization of Atlanta's North Avenue Presbyterian School (NAPS), a girls' school and an affiliate of the North Avenue Presbyterian Church. Dr. William L. Pressly of Chattanooga, Tennessee's McCallie School served as Westminster's first president. The school moved to its current campus in 1953 as the result of a land grant by trustee Fritz Orr.

Also in 1953, Washington Seminary, another private school for girls, founded by two of George Washington's great-nieces in 1878, merged with Westminster. The resulting school was coeducational until the sixth grade, with separate schools for boys and girls continuing through the twelfth grade, a practice that continued until 1986 and provided the basis of Westminster's plural name.

In the mid-1950s, Westminster became a test site for a new advanced studies program that would later become the College Board's Advanced Placement program. In 1962, the administration building, later named Pressly Hall, was constructed, bringing the number of permanent buildings on campus to four. Until 1978, the school also operated as a boarding school, using Tull Hall as a dormitory.

In the early 1960s, the school barred black students and only rarely allowed African-Americans on campus. In 1965, the school's trustees voted to adopt a nondiscriminatory admissions policy.

In 2006 the school ran a campaign attempting to raise $100 million to further increase its endowment size. The campaign was at the time the third-largest ever for an independent school in the United States.

== Campus ==
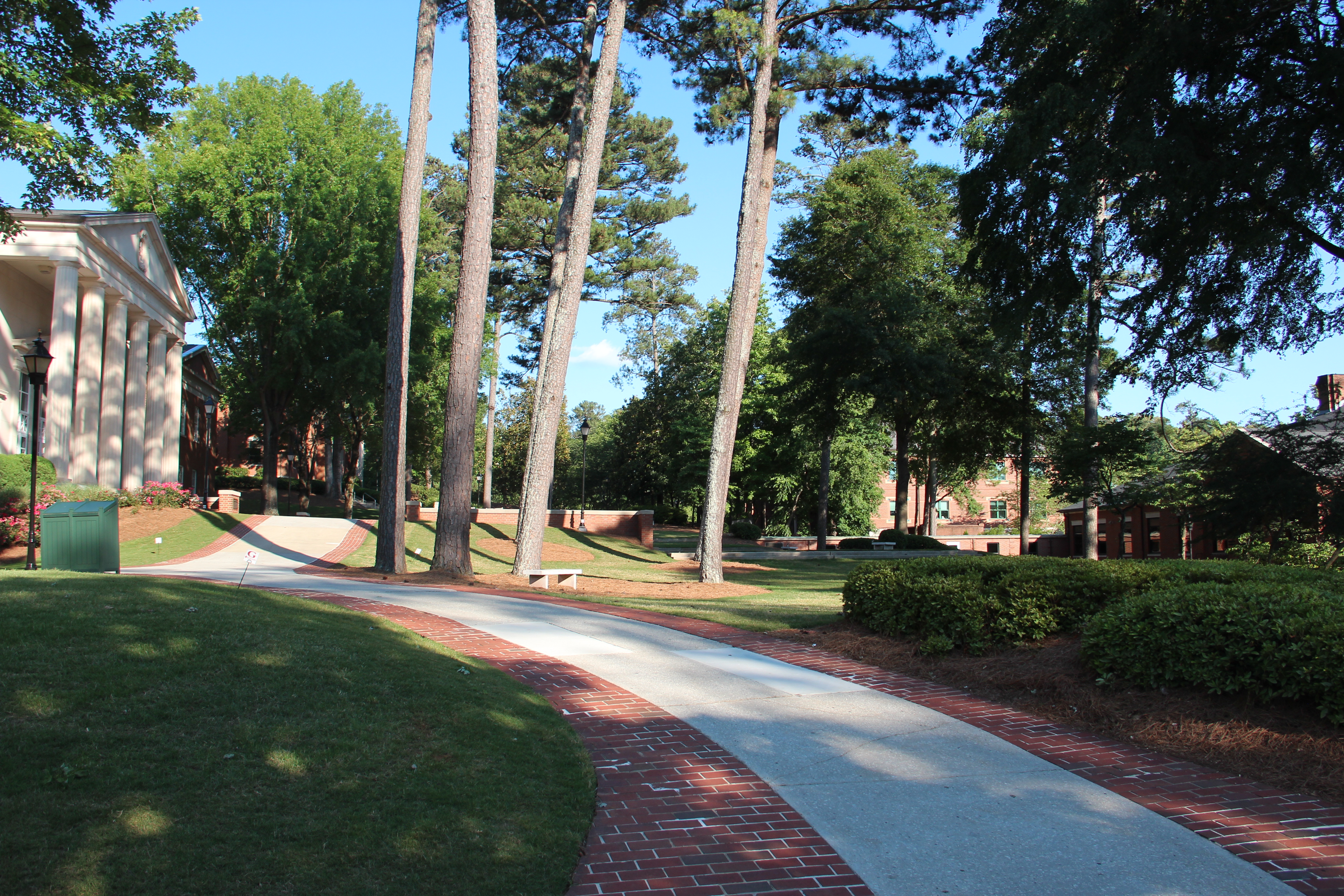
The quadrangle located on Westminster's campus

Westminster is on a wooded campus of 180 acres (0.73 km^{2}) in the Buckhead community of Atlanta. Westminster has seven main high school academic buildings – Askew Hall (1953), Campbell Hall (1953), Pressly Hall (1962), Broyles Art Center (1988), Robinson Hall (1996), Hawkins Hall (2020) and The Blake Center (2026). The other buildings include Tull Hall (1964), Turner Gymnasium (1970), the elementary school, Love Hall (1997), the middle school, Clarkson Hall (2005), Barge Commons (2021), and the Glenn Early Learning Center (2025).

Pressly Hall houses administrative offices, college counseling, the upper school choral music and orchestra programs, Malone Dining Hall, The Carlyle Fraser Library, and McCain Chapel. Originally built in 1970, Turner Gymnasium underwent major construction and expansion completed in 2001. The gym is home to the Merrill Aquatics Center, the Howell Basketball Center, the Ellis Fitness Center, the Gladney Squash Courts, the Smith Family Climbing Wall, the Hawkins Training Room, the Stringer Indoor Track, middle school physical education classes, and athletic administrative offices. Broyles Arts Center houses the middle school orchestra and band programs, the upper school band program, the upper school theatre program, mainly in Kellett Theatre, a 463-seat theatre where all of the plays and musicals are performed, as well as the Campus Bookstore, an area for students to purchase snacks and Westminster apparel. It held the classes for the upper school visual art program until 2025, but continues to hold the art displays in the Gaines Foyer and Gallery.

Love Hall, the elementary school, underwent an extensive renovation completed in 2024, which added the brand-new 500-seat Taylor Auditorium, two art labs, three Design Thinking Labs, one instructional music practice hall, and new spaces at the front of the building that help foster creativity and community. Barge Commons serves as the “front door” of the campus, housing a chapel overlooking the high school buildings lining both sides, classrooms, a 356-person meeting space used for conferences, gatherings, and presentations, a cafe, an admissions office, as well as many places for students to relax and socialize. Tull Hall, which housed the dorm rooms for boarding students from its inception until 1978, held kindergarten classes until 1997, and then served as the preschool from then until November 2025. The Glenn Early Learning Center, completed that same year, is specifically designed to create an engaging environment for young children. It now serves as Westminster's preschool.

Westminster has just completed an extensive campus renovation to enhance teacher-student connection. Campbell Hall received a complete renovation, a new 28,000-square-foot upper school academic building (Hawkins Hall) was built, and a new parking deck was completed. The football stadium was rebuilt, along with a brand new softball field and a community plaza. The Blake Center, a 40,000-square-foot Upper School Building standing on the site where Scott Hall formerly stood, was completed in January 2026. It accommodates nine innovation labs and 4,030 square feet of visual arts classroom space. The building also houses over ten informal collaboration spaces accessible to all students. Among other extracurricular groups, the Blake Center serves as the home of the new studio for the Emmy Award-winning WCAT broadcast team and the new robotics den for Westminster’s robotics team, the 2415 WiredCats.

The campus hosted the Atlanta Marathon from 1964 until 1980. During the 1996 Atlanta Olympics, the Torch was run through campus. The floor used for the basketball games during the Olympics is now in the school's Lower School gymnasium.

== Athletics ==
Westminster fields athletic teams.

For the 2012–13 school year, Westminster was named the nation's best overall sports program for its eleven state championships and four second-place finishes. Nearly a decade later, for the 2021-22 school year, Westminster was again named the nation's best overall sports program with ten state championships, two second-place finishes, and a final four appearance from the boys' soccer team.

These teams have won 331 state championships since 1951, including seven in the 2016–17 school year. Westminster has received the Georgia Athletic Directors' Association Director's Cup in its respective classification in 23 of the 25 years it has been awarded, 2000–2013 and 2015–2024. The varsity boys' tennis team won the Georgia State High School AAA State Championship in ten seasons in a row, 1999–2009. The boys' team has yielded many Division 1 NCAA scholarship tennis players over the years, and it has won several regional tournaments as well. As the first two sports teams of Westminster, the boys and girls tennis teams have each won 52 state championships, winning their most recent in the 2025-2026 school year. Starting in 1958, Paul A. Koshewa (1923-2016), a WWII, Korea, and Vietnam veteran who was awarded several Purple Hearts, and taught math and science from 1955-1990, became the inaugural coach for the boys', and after several decades of lobbying and organizing to make it an official GHSA sport, the girls' cross country teams. The boys have won 33 and the girls have won 35 state championships respectively, each winning their most recent in the 2025-2026 school year. The men's (28) and women's (29) swimming & diving teams have won a combined 57 state championships, 34 of which under former coach Pete Higgins, whose accolades through 51 years of coaching include membership in the Georgia Aquatics Hall of Fame, recognition of January 5, 1990 as Pete Higgins Day by the City of Atlanta, among others. Westminster fields the sole varsity squash team south of Woodberry Forest School in Virginia featuring full interscholastic competition; the team placed 16th in the 2004 U.S. National High School Team Championships, held at Yale University, and the Squash Cats also won the title in 2012, 2016, and 2018.

In 2014, Westminster moved up a class from AA to AAA. In 2015, Westminster's football team won the AAA state championship for the first time in 37 years against rival Blessed Trinity Catholic High School in overtime, with a final score of 38–31. That game was won under the leadership of former head football coach Gerry Romberg, who led his team to win 239 games over the course of his 33 years as head coach (1992-2025), which led him to become the 3rd winningest coach in Georgia High School history. In 2016, Westminster's baseball team won the AAA state championship for the first time in 41 years, also against Blessed Trinity Catholic High School, sweeping the championship series in a pair of one-run victories. Westminster's boys and girls soccer teams have won a combined 33 state championships – the most soccer state championships in Georgia High School history. The 2019 boys team also finished the season ranked #1 in the nation by MaxPreps meanwhile the 2021 girls team finished as the unanimous #1 team in the nation and again by MaxPreps in 2022.

== Extracurricular activities ==
=== WCAT ===
WCAT, the school's broadcast program, streams events and school activities online. In the 2016–17 school year, more than 45 students from all three divisions helped stream more than 220 events. Since its inception in 2010, the program has won 8 awards and 7 honorable mentions from the National Academy of Television Arts and Sciences Southeast division. In 2017, WCAT won its first-ever National Student Production Award from NATAS for Best Sports – Live Event Broadcast.

=== Policy debate ===
The Policy Debate team has won 16 state championships as well as many large national tournaments, including the national Tournament of Champions five times. The team also won the National Debate Coaches' Association Championships in 2007, 2014, and 2017.

=== Robotics ===
The robotics team at Westminster began in 2008 and is identified as FRC Team 2415, the WiredCats. The team has qualified for the FRC international championships every year since their inception, more than any other team in the state. They placed 5th at the Houston International Championships in 2017 after winning their subdivision at the International Championships, being one of few teams in Georgia to have made it to the Einstein Field Bracket. The team won the Peachtree District Championship in 2018 and 2019. They have other accolades including ten regional/district event wins in 2009, 2011, 2012, 2015, 2017, 2018, 2019, and 2023, the chairman's award in 2010, the engineering inspiration award in 2011, 2012, 2013, 2014, 2017, and 2018, the creativity award in 2024, and the judge's award in 2025.

== In popular culture ==
The Blind Side (2009) was filmed on the school's campus in June 2009, with students, parents, teachers and coaches acting as extras. Senior Year (2022) was also filmed on campus.
