= Star Wars: Episode III – Revenge of the Sith (video game) =

2005 video game

- Developers: The Collective; Ubisoft Montreal (handheld versions)
- Publishers: LucasArts; Ubisoft (handheld versions)
- Series: Star Wars
- Platforms: PlayStation 2, Xbox, Game Boy Advance, Nintendo DS, Symbian
- Release: May 5, 2005
- Genre: Action
- Modes: Single-player, multiplayer

Star Wars: Episode III – Revenge of the Sith is an action video game based on the 2005 film of the same name. It was released on May 5, 2005, for the PlayStation 2, Xbox, Game Boy Advance, Nintendo DS, and Symbian OS. For the Xbox 360's backwards compatible lineup, Revenge of the Sith is one out of the 400+ backwards compatible games for the 360. As part of the PlayStation 2 classics program, the PlayStation 2 version was re-released in Europe on the PlayStation Network on February 11, 2015, and in North America on April 28, 2015 for PlayStation 3. Additionally, the game can be purchased from the Xbox digital store and played on Xbox One and Xbox Series consoles through the Xbox backwards compatibility program.

A PlayStation Portable version was in development, but was cancelled. The game received mixed reviews from critics.

== Gameplay ==
=== Consoles ===
Revenge of the Sith largely follows the plot of the film. The story mode features single-player gameplay, but several levels feature an NPC companion accompanying the player character, such as this level featuring an NPC Obi-Wan Kenobi assisting the player-controlled Anakin Skywalker.

In single-player mode, the player alternates between playing as Anakin Skywalker and Obi-Wan Kenobi, reliving various scenes from the film throughout the game's missions. There are 17 levels, interlaced with over 12 minutes of footage from the film as cutscenes. The game's combat system is heavily concentrated on lightsaber combat. Each of the playable characters (except the MagnaGuard) is equipped with at least one lightsaber. There are three basic attacks: fast attacks, which do the least amount of damage; strong attacks, which do more damage but are slower to execute; and slow but immensely powerful critical attacks. These attacks can be mixed to create combination attacks. Attacks can also be charged up for greater strength. One feature of the game is called a Saber Lock - a sequence in which the player's character clashes sabers with an opponent and must overpower them to avoid losing health.

The game features an experience system, whereby the player's character can upgrade attacks and gain new ones as they progress through the game. Each ability, except the Force Dash, can be upgraded to more powerful levels. In addition to offensive techniques, defensive techniques are also available. The player's character automatically deflects a certain percentage of blaster bolts, but other shots and attacks must be deflected manually. Aside from saber combat and force powers, each character has many physical attacks that can be incorporated into combos. Nearly all characters have a kick that can instantly floor opponents. Many characters can also punch their opponents. The game environment is interactive, allowing and in some cases requiring the player to execute actions such as moving and destroying objects with the lightsaber or force powers.

The PS2 and Xbox versions of the game feature a multiplayer duel mode, in which two players face off against each other in a lightsaber battle. Players can choose Obi-Wan Kenobi, Anakin Skywalker, Count Dooku, General Grievous, Mace Windu, Cin Drallig or Jedi Padawan Serra Keto. Darth Vader and "Ben Kenobi", circa Episode IV, can also be unlocked. Each battle can be won with the best of one, three, or five rounds, depending on the options chosen. In addition, all characters have equal health and energy, with all status upgrades acquired by Anakin and Obi-Wan in the single-player mode eliminated. However, all of the upgraded techniques and Force Powers are available, and each of the other characters has special abilities and maneuvers. In addition to the original costumes found throughout the single-player campaign, each character has a different costume that is used when both players choose the same character. Some of these costumes depict Sith versions of certain Jedi characters.

With the successful completion of specific missions in the single-player campaign, bonus scenarios can be unlocked. Each scenario features a different playable character: the MagnaGuard, General Grievous, Yoda, Anakin, or Darth Vader. In addition, there are four cooperative missions in which two players (or one player and a computer-controlled character) work together to defeat enemies. The first three team up Anakin and Obi-Wan for many offensive encounters with the Separatists' droid army, while the fourth has Jedi Master Cin Drallig and his favorite student, Serra Keto, teaming up to defeat the clone squadron bent on destroying the Jedi Temple per Order 66.

=== Handhelds ===
The handheld versions of the game are played as a 2.5D side-scrolling beat 'em up game, where players can freely choose to play as either Obi-Wan or Anakin, traversing across roughly a dozen levels to battle a variety of enemies and occasionally dodge deadly hazards, such as a laser trap or a missile launcher. Both characters have nearly identical attack moves and can gain access to special unlockable moves that can be unleashed when a "fury" or "focus" gauge is filled up during battle. A few levels involve boss battles against characters with melee weapons, who usually can only be damaged after the player carefully recognizes and blocks an attack, and some other levels end with a miniboss fight against a vehicle or elite enemy. The Nintendo DS version also features exclusive 3D space battle levels that require the player to shoot down a series of targets or enemies.

As with the PS2 and Xbox versions, players are given a chance to upgrade their character's attacks and abilities, unlock new abilities, and improve their stats after completing a level. Players purchase upgrades with "customization points", which are found during a level, collected from destroying small portions of the scenery, or earned by finishing the level at a quicker pace or with good combat efficiency. Players must deflect all blaster bolts manually by pressing a button, while well-timed presses can allow the player to deflect them straight back.

The GBA version of the game allows two players to link up and participate in exclusive co-op missions as Anakin and Obi-Wan across three planets featured in Genndy Tartakovsky's Star Wars: Clone Wars 2003 microseries (Dantooine, Muunilinst and Yavin 4), or have the two of them fight off endless waves of enemies and see who can survive the longest. The Nintendo DS version exclusively features 3D multiplayer space battles that take advantage of the DS' graphical capabilities and allow players to pilot and battle with iconic vehicles from both the prequel and original eras of Star Wars, such as the Millennium Falcon.

== Plot ==
Anakin Skywalker and Obi-Wan Kenobi arrive on board the Invisible Hand, the Separatist flagship of General Grievous, who has kidnapped Supreme Chancellor Palpatine above Coruscant. After battling droids in the main hangar bay and ascending the elevators, the duo arrives at the general's quarters, where Palpatine is being held. However, they are then confronted by Grievous' master Count Dooku and in the ensuing duel, Obi-Wan is knocked out and Anakin, in violation of Jedi teachings, brutally kills Dooku by running him through with his lightsaber. The pair then escapes with Palpatine but are recaptured and brought before Grievous on the ship's bridge. They escape as the badly damaged ship capsizes in orbit and fight off Grievous' bodyguards while the general escapes. Anakin manages to save everyone by crashing the ship on Coruscant.

Obi-Wan journeys to Utapau in search of Grievous and confronts him after he dispatches the Separatist council to the planet of Mustafar for safety. Obi-Wan then duels Grievous as Republic Army clones invade and battle the droids. Grievous reaches the launch platform where his ship is situated, but Obi-Wan impales and kills him. Meanwhile, on Coruscant, Anakin discovers Jedi Master Mace Windu preparing to execute Palpatine, who is revealed to be the Sith lord Darth Sidious, in his office. Anakin, who believes Palpatine can help him, intervenes and duels Windu, who attempts to fight off Anakin before returning to finish off the chancellor. Anakin stabs him and throws him out a window to his death; Anakin then pledges himself to the Sith. Palpatine dubs him "Darth Vader" and orders him to wipe out all of the Jedi in the Jedi Temple. Anakin and an army of clone troopers make their way to the Temple, where he kills librarian Jocasta Nu, initiating the massacre. While the clones mop up the survivors, Anakin confronts Serra Keto and crushes her with a pillar. He is then confronted by her master, Cin Drallig, whom he also duels—the two wind up outside the temple, where Vader impales Drallig through the chest.

Across the galaxy, the clones, following orders from Palpatine, turn on their Jedi generals and murder them. Obi-Wan manages to escape from Utapau after being relentlessly hunted by both the droids and his soldiers. Palpatine orders Anakin to go to Mustafar and wipe out the Separatist leaders. After brutally cutting down their Neimoidian guards, Anakin forces his way into the council chambers, killing Poggle the Lesser, Wat Tambor, and two others as Viceroy Nute Gunray flees for his life. Anakin cuts down Gunray's lieutenant Rune Haako, and then catches Gunray trying to escape on his ship, which he destroys and tosses into the planet's lava.

Meanwhile, on Coruscant, Obi-Wan and Master Yoda raid the ruins of the Jedi Temple, clearing it of clone soldiers and deactivating a beacon left by them as a trap for other Jedi. Desperate to know who was responsible, Obi-Wan discovers security recordings of Anakin becoming a Sith lord. The recording also reveals Anakin's location, so Obi-Wan heads to Mustafar to confront him.

The two former friends engage in a ferocious lightsaber duel across the Mustafar facility, which is slowly being destroyed by lava. The two end up on a platform floating down a lava river; Obi-Wan jumps off and demands that his fallen apprentice surrender. An enraged Anakin leaps over him, allowing Obi-Wan to cut off his legs and left arm. Anakin slides towards the lava and catches on fire; Obi-Wan picks up his fallen lightsaber and leaves him for dead. Palpatine arrives and finds Anakin badly injured, but still alive; he has him surgically reconstructed and builds him a special suit, turning him into Darth Vader. The two oversee the construction of the Death Star as the Republic falls and the Empire is born.

In a break from the film's plot, the PS2 and Xbox versions also feature an alternate ending. In the final level, during the battle between Anakin and Obi-Wan, the player can play as Anakin and must defeat Obi-Wan. In this ending, Anakin's ill-fated jump is successful, and he kills Obi-Wan before kicking his body to the edge of the lava river. After killing his former master, Anakin returns to Emperor Palpatine and obtains a new, red lightsaber. As the Emperor congratulates him, Anakin murders him and takes his place, having been thoroughly corrupted by his new power.

This ending is not present in the GBA and DS versions. The player is instead given the canonical narrative of Vader losing his duel against Obi-Wan and revived by Palpatine in a mechanical suit.

== Development ==
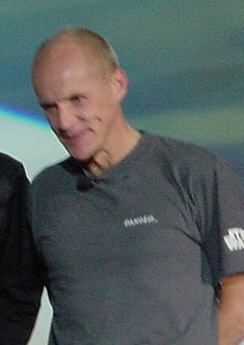
Nick Gillard, the lead stunt coordinator of the Star Wars prequel films, served as a consultant for the game's lightsaber combat.

The game's development was aided by Nick Gillard, the stunt coordinator and lightsaber fight choreographer for the prequel trilogy films, who consulted on the game's lightsaber combat. In addition, Jedi Master Cin Drallig, a character portrayed by Gillard, appears in the game as both a boss and a playable character, although with a different voice actor. Hayden Christensen also consulted on lightsaber combat and Anakin's character, despite not reprising his role in the game.

The game featured many of the cast members from the 2003 animated series Star Wars: Clone Wars. Additionally, stock footage of the actors from the films appeared in many of the game's cinematics. Alethea McGrath reprised her role as Jocasta Nu from Attack of the Clones. She and Matthew Wood were the only actors from the films to do so. All other voice actors have either done voice work in the Star Wars universe before or since. James Arnold Taylor, who later voices Obi-Wan Kenobi in the 2008 Star Wars: The Clone Wars series, provides the voice of Obi-Wan. Mat Lucas provides the voice of Anakin Skywalker, having also doubled for Christensen in the 2002 Star Wars: Clone Wars video game and Star Wars: Battlefront II as well as in the 2003 Clone Wars series. Voice actor Corey Burton, primary talent for the animated version of Count Dooku, voices various minor characters as well as Dooku himself. General Grievous is voiced by Matthew Wood, who also provided his voice in the game's film counterpart and the 2008 Clone Wars series. Terrence C. Carson voices Mace Windu and Nick Jameson voices Chancellor Palpatine/Darth Sidious and "Ben" Kenobi. Scott Lawrence, best known for his role as Sturgis Turner on the CBS series JAG, provides the voice for Darth Vader. Yoda and Cin Drallig are both voiced by Tom Kane, who also provides additional voices. Finally, Serra Keto is voiced by Kari Wahlgren. A mobile port for phones running Symbian OS was released on April 2, 2005.

== Reception ==
Reception

Aggregate scores
Aggregator	Score
GameRankings	(DS) 71.85% (GBA) 71.41% (Xbox) 65.85% (PS2) 64.53%
Metacritic	(DS) 73/100 (GBA) 73/100 (Xbox) 61/100 (PS2) 60/100

Review scores
Publication	Score
Edge	4/10
Electronic Gaming Monthly	(GBA) 7.17/10; 5.33/10 (DS) 4.17/10
Eurogamer	4/10
Game Informer	5.75/10 (DS) 4/10
GamePro	4.5/5 (Xbox & PS2) 2.5/5
GameSpot	(DS) 7.3/10 (GBA) 7/10 (Mobile) 6.6/10; 6.3/10
GameSpy	4/5 (DS) 3.5/5 (GBA) 3/5
GameTrailers	8/10
GameZone	7.7/10 (PS2) 7.4/10
IGN	(Mobile) 7.8/10 (DS) 7.5/10 (GBA) 7/10; 4.5/10
Nintendo Power	(DS) 8/10 (GBA) 7/10
Official U.S. PlayStation Magazine	3/5
Official Xbox Magazine (US)	7.8/10
Detroit Free Press	2/4
Maxim	8/10

The game received mixed reviews upon release. GameRankings and Metacritic gave it a score of 71.85% and 73 out of 100 for the DS version; 71.41% and 73 out of 100 for the Game Boy Advance version; 65.85% and 61 out of 100 for the Xbox version; and 64.53% and 60 out of 100 for the PlayStation 2 version.

Ivan Sullic of IGN rated the PS2 and Xbox versions 4.5 out of ten. He criticised the camera, the combo-system, the graphics, level design, AI and, most specifically, the implementation of the combat-based gameplay. GameSpy gave the game a better review, awarding the same versions 4 out of 5. GameSpot also rated the same versions of the game 6.3 out of 10.

Maxim gave the PS2 and Xbox versions a score of eight out of ten and stated that "Like the movie itself, the game's surprisingly good and full of decent action as you use Jedi skills in a barrage of lightsaber battles to win one for good or evil." However, Detroit Free Press gave the latter version a score of two stars out of four and said that "Flawed gameplay that borders on monotonous is this game's menace. While the lightsaber fighting scheme is actually fairly deep, especially when you mix in grapple attacks, force tricks and counterattacks on top of counterattacks, I rarely used most of these goodies." The Sydney Morning Herald also gave the former version a score of two-and-a-half stars out of five and stated that "the offensive moves cannot stop the game from feeling repetitive. Shield door "puzzles" are recycled, while brief turret-blasting interludes are dull."

The PS2 and Xbox versions of Revenge of the Sith received a "Platinum" sales award from the Entertainment and Leisure Software Publishers Association (ELSPA), indicating sales of at least 400,000 copies in PAL regions.

In the United States, the game sold 2.01 million units by 2006.

== Sources ==
- The Collective (May 4, 2005). Star Wars: Episode III - Revenge of the Sith (PlayStation 2, Xbox). LucasArts.
