= Nick Gillard =

English stuntman and stunt coordinator

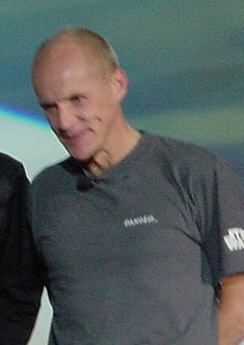
- Born: 1959 (age 66–67); Brighton, England
- Occupations: Stunt coordinator, stuntman, actor
- Years active: 1977–present

Nick Gillard is an English stuntman and stunt coordinator. He is best known as the lead lightsaber fight and stunt coordinator of the Star Wars prequel trilogy films (1999–2005).

== Early life ==
Gillard was born in Brighton, England. At the age of twelve, he ran away from military school to join the circus where he performed as bareback horse rider. Over the next few years Gillard worked with several circus's including Circus Althoff in Germany and Los Muchachos Circus in Spain. Gillard was invited to do stunts on The Thief of Baghdad. He enjoyed it, and later left the circus to perform stunt work in films, including the original Star Wars. Gillard was Mark Hamill's first choice as his stunt double for Return of the Jedi, though he only doubled for Hamill in the subsequent Britannia Hospital.

== Career ==
As a stuntman, Gillard held the world record for longest fire stunt, with a fire burn without air for over two minutes on Alien 3. He also performed a 200-foot power boat jump over two bridges in the film Amsterdamned, and was set on fire over 100 times.

Among Gillard's movie credits are Sleepy Hollow, Robin Hood: Prince of Thieves, Raiders of the Lost Ark and Indiana Jones and the Last Crusade. Gillard was the fight choreographer of the Star Wars prequels. He had a cameo appearance in Star Wars: Episode III – Revenge of the Sith as Cin Drallig ("Nic Gillard" spelled backwards). His likeness was used for the character with a larger role in the accompanying video game, for which Gillard choreographed the combat animations.

== Filmography ==
=== As stunt coordinator, arranger or performer ===
==== Film ====
- 1977 The Spy Who Loved Me
- 1981 For Your Eyes Only
- 1983 Krull
- 1984 Scream for Help
- 1985 Restless Natives
- 1985 The Bride
- 1985 Legend
- 1985 Murder Elite
- 1985 Claudia
- 1985 Christmas Present
- 1986 Labyrinth
- 1986 Aliens
- 1987 The Living Daylights
- 1987 Empire of the Sun
- 1988 Amsterdamned
- 1988 Willow
- 1988 Dream Demon
- 1988 The Beast of War
- 1989 Indiana Jones and the Last Crusade
- 1989 Henry V
- 1990 1871
- 1990 Frankenstein Unbound
- 1990 Bullseye!
- 1991 Young Soul Rebels
- 1991 Robin Hood: Prince of Thieves
- 1991 Company Business
- 1991 Under Suspicion
- 1992 Far and Away
- 1992 Alien³
- 1992 Double X: The Name of the Game
- 1992 1492: Conquest of Paradise
- 1993 Son of the Pink Panther
- 1993 The Three Musketeers
- 1994 Being Human
- 1994 Black Beauty
- 1994 Interview with the Vampire
- 1995 Rob Roy
- 1995 Judge Dredd
- 1995 Waterworld
- 1995 Nothing Personal
- 1995 GoldenEye
- 1995 The Darkening
- 1996 Twelfth Night: Or What You Will
- 1996 The Wind in the Willows
- 1997 Seven Years in Tibet
- 1997 Tomorrow Never Dies
- 1999 Plunkett & Macleane
- 1999 Notting Hill
- 1999 Star Wars: Episode I – The Phantom Menace (Also swordmaster)
- 1999 Sleepy Hollow
- 2000 Shaft
- 2001 Buffalo Soldiers
- 2002 Star Wars: Episode II – Attack of the Clones (Also swordmaster)
- 2002 Reign of Fire
- 2002 Dirty Pretty Things
- 2005 Star Wars: Episode III – Revenge of the Sith (Also swordmaster)
- 2008 Wanted
- 2010 Tamara Drewe
- 2013 The Fold
- 2015 The Hippopotamus

==== Television ====
- 1983 Owain Glendower, Prince of Wales
- 1983 A Pattern of Roses
- 1985 Lace II
- 1987 Screen Two
- 1987 Floodtide
- 1987 Way Upstream
- 1988 The One Game
- 1989–1990 Poirot
- 1989–1990 Boon
- 1989–2010 The Bill
- 1991 Duel of Hearts
- 1992 Forever Green
- 1992 Taggart
- 1993 Lovejoy
- 1993 Between the Lines
- 1994 Wild Justice
- 1994–1995 The Tomorrow People
- 1995 Pie in the Sky
- 1996 Broken Glass
- 1997–1999 Red Dwarf
- 2000 The Adventures of Young Indiana Jones: My First Adventure
- 2005 Colditz
- 2009 Minder
- 2010 Identity
- 2010 Spooks
- 2013 Burton & Taylor
- 2014 Da Vinci's Demons (Season 3) (Also swordmaster)
- 2015 Jekyll & Hyde
- 2015 And Then There Were None
- 2015 Undercover
- 2016 Guilt
- 2016 Black Mirror
- 2016 Rillington Place
- 2016 The White Princess (Also swordmaster)
- 2016 The Domestics
- 2017 The Brave
- 2017 The Miniaturist
- 2018 The Alienist
- 2018 Kiss Me First
- 2018 Dark Heart

==== Video games ====
- 2005 Star Wars: Episode III – Revenge of the Sith (Also likeness as Cin Drallig)

=== As second unit director ===
| Year | Title | Director |
|---|---|---|
| 1999 | Star Wars: Episode I – The Phantom Menace | George Lucas |
| 2000 | Shaft | John Singleton |
| 2002 | Reign of Fire | Rob Bowman |

=== As actor ===
==== Film ====
- 1981: Raiders of the Lost Ark – German Soldier (uncredited)
- 1989: Indiana Jones and the Last Crusade – Periscope Soldier (uncredited)
- 1990: King of the Wind – First Sailor
- 1990: Frankenstein Unbound – Man No. 2/Man No. 3
- 2003: Cheeky – Taxi Driver
- 2005: Star Wars: Episode III – Revenge of the Sith – Cin Drallig
- 2014: Vampire Academy – Kenneth (uncredited)

==== Television ====
- 1979: Premiere – Angel
- 1982: The Jim Davidson Show
- 1985: Mr. Palfrey of Westminster – Alec Thompson
- 1989: Ticket to Ride – Brother Paul
- 1989: Streetwise – Heavy
- 1990: EastEnders – Restaurant Manager
- 1990: TECX – Luke/Luc
- 1991: Bottom
- 1994: Minder – Queen
