= Cusseta, Alabama =

- Town
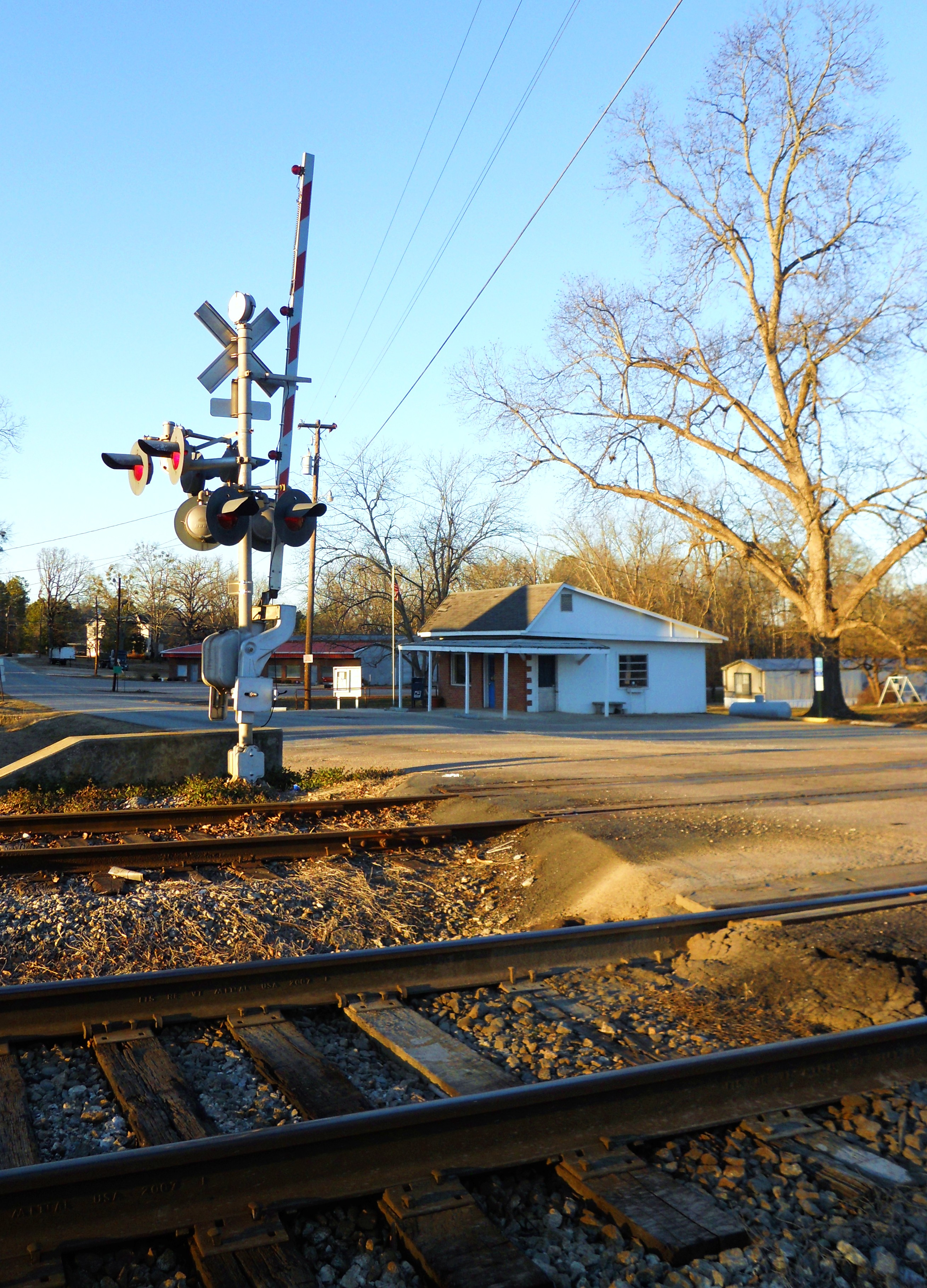
- Cusseta, Alabama post office

- Location of Cusseta in Chambers County, Alabama.
- Coordinates: 32°47′15″N 85°18′21″W
- Country: United States
- State: Alabama
- County: Chambers
- Incorporated (city): 1853
- Incorporated (town): 2007
- Named after: The ancient Creek Indian town of Cusseta.

Area
  - Total: 2.63 sq mi (6.80 km^{2})
  - Land: 2.63 sq mi (6.80 km^{2})
  - Water: 0 sq mi (0.00 km^{2})
- Elevation: 709 ft (216 m)

Population (2020)
  - Total: 152
  - Density: 57.9/sq mi (22.36/km^{2})
- Time zone: UTC-6 (CST)
  - Summer (DST): UTC-5 (CDT)
- ZIP Code: 36852
- Area code: 334
- FIPS code: 01-19216
- GNIS feature ID: 2424934
- Website: cusseta-al.com

Cusseta /kə.ˈsiː.də/ is a town in Chambers County, Alabama, United States. Situated between Opelika and Lanett, it was named for the ancient Creek Indian town of Cusseta. As of the 2020 census, Cusseta had a population of 152.

Pat Garrett, the lawman famed for killing the outlaw Billy the Kid, was born near Cusseta in 1850.

The community was believed to be unincorporated until 2006, when rediscovered documents indicated that Cusseta had been incorporated as a city in 1853. As the community diminished in size over the years, its status was forgotten.

In 2007, Chambers County Probate Judge John Crowder signed the order reinstating the Town of Cusseta. The town council included Robert Gay, Ann Alsobrook, Perry Vajda, Stanely Newton, and George Waller. The mayor position was filled by Kent Lauderdale.

== Demographics ==
Historical population
Census	Pop.	Note	%±
2010	123		—
2020	152		23.6%
U.S. Decennial Census; 2013 Estimate

== Notable people ==
- Emily Hendree Stewart Park (1848–1910), President of the Washington Seminary (Atlanta)
- Pat Garrett, lawman and killer of Billy The Kid

== See also ==
- Fort Cusseta
