= Creuzier-le-Vieux =

- Commune
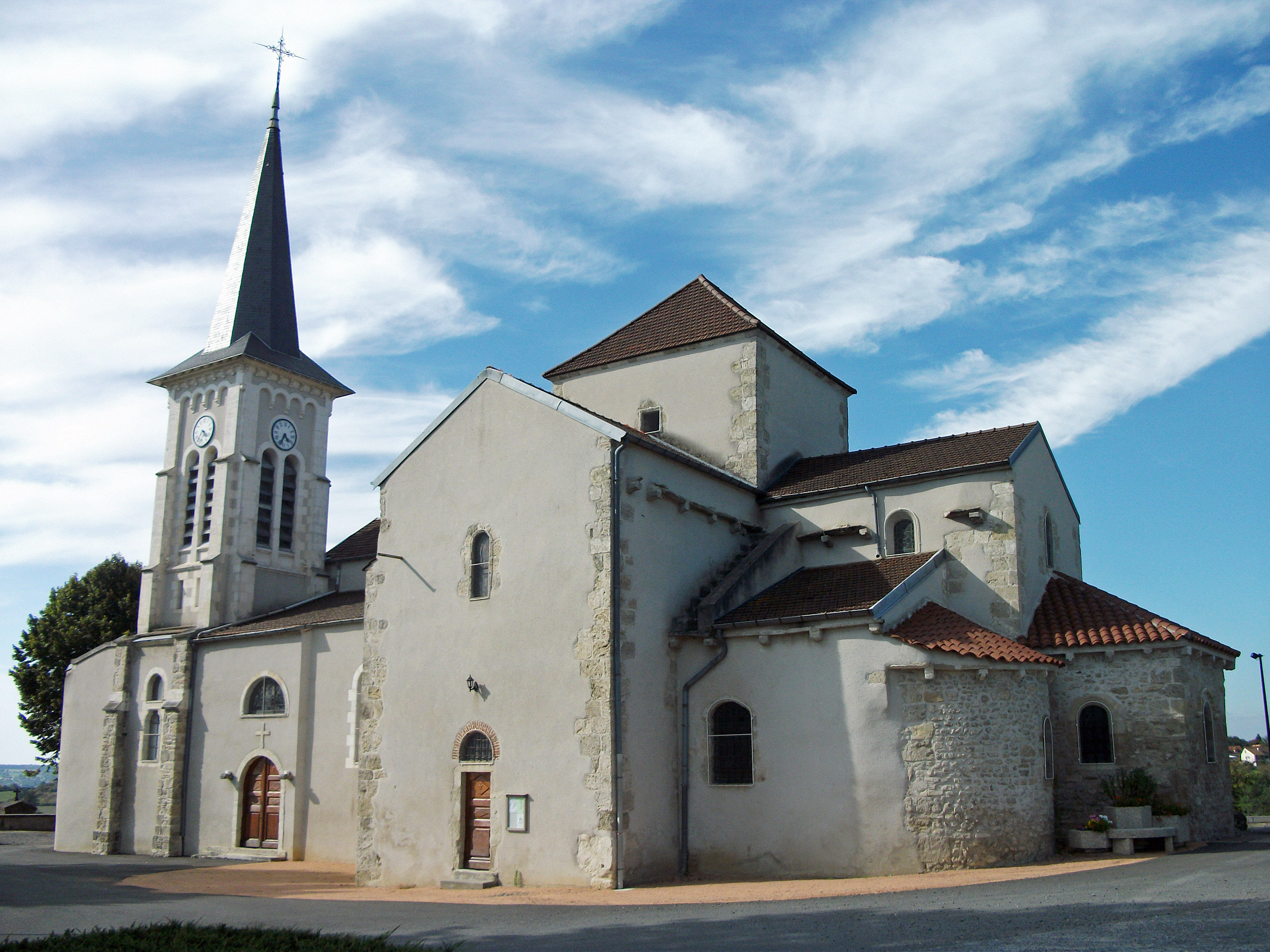
- Church of Creuzier-le-Vieux in 2014

- Coat of arms
- Location of Creuzier-le-Vieux
- Location within France Location within Auvergne-Rhône-Alpes
- Coordinates: 46°09′38″N 3°26′06″E
- Country: France
- Region: Auvergne-Rhône-Alpes
- Department: Allier
- Arrondissement: Vichy
- Canton: Cusset
- Intercommunality: CA Vichy Communauté

Government
  - Mayor (2026–32): Marie-Christine Goubel
- Area^{1}: 11.38 km^{2} (4.39 sq mi)
- Elevation: 390 m (1,280 ft)
- Highest elevation: 404 m (1,325 ft)
- Lowest elevation: 243 m (797 ft)
- Population (2023): 3,205
  - Density: 281.6/km^{2} (729.4/sq mi)
- Time zone: UTC+01:00 (CET)
  - Summer (DST): UTC+02:00 (CEST)
- INSEE/Postal code: 03094 /03300
- ^{1} French Land Register data, which excludes lakes, ponds, glaciers > 1 km^{2} (0.386 sq mi or 247 acres) and river estuaries.

Creuzier-le-Vieux (French pronunciation: [kʁøzje lə vjø]) is a commune in the Allier department in central France.

== Geography ==
=== Location ===
Creuzier-le-Vieux is located near Montagne Verte (Green Mountain), north of the two main cities of the agglomeration that are Vichy and Cusset.

=== Transport ===
==== Road transport ====
The city is accessible through several departmental roads:

- D 6^{E}, serving La Pergola polyclinic;
- D 27 (from Cusset to Saulzet via Beausoleil and Pont Boutiron hamlets);
- D 174 serving Rhue and Laudemarière hamlets and Vichy-Rhue industrial area;
- D 258 (from Vichy to Saint-Germain-des-Fossés via town centre and Laudemarière hamlet);
- D 558 (from Les Arloings hamlet to Seuillet);
- D 658.

==== Rail transport ====
The Saint-Germain-des-Fossés–Darsac railway passes to the west of the town.

The nearest railway stations are in Saint-Germain-des-Fossés and Vichy.

==== Urban transport ====
Creuzier-le-Vieux is served by two of the eight lines of the network public transport MobiVie. Line A serves collège Jules-Ferry and hospital; line D serves the borough.

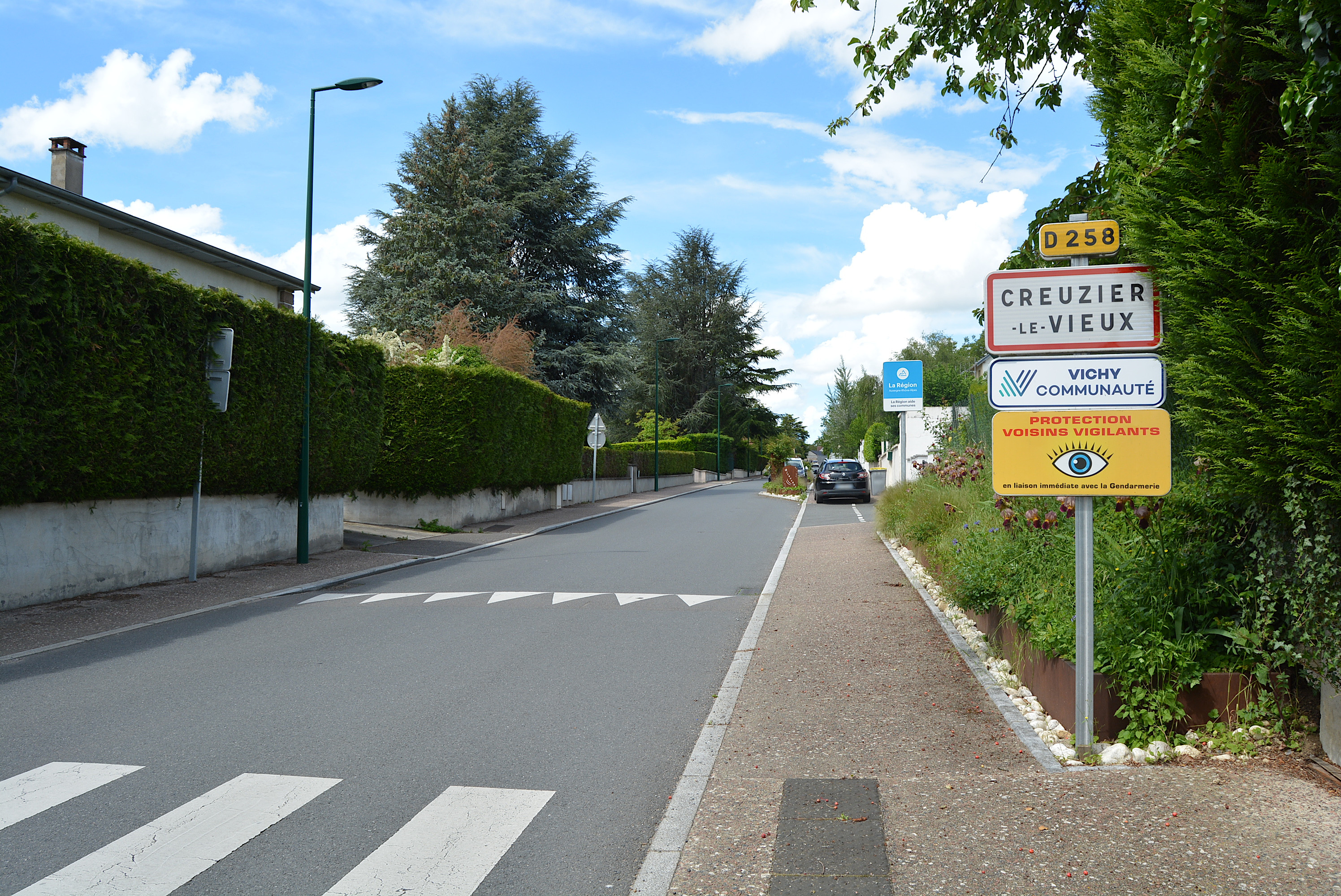
Entrance from Beausoleil

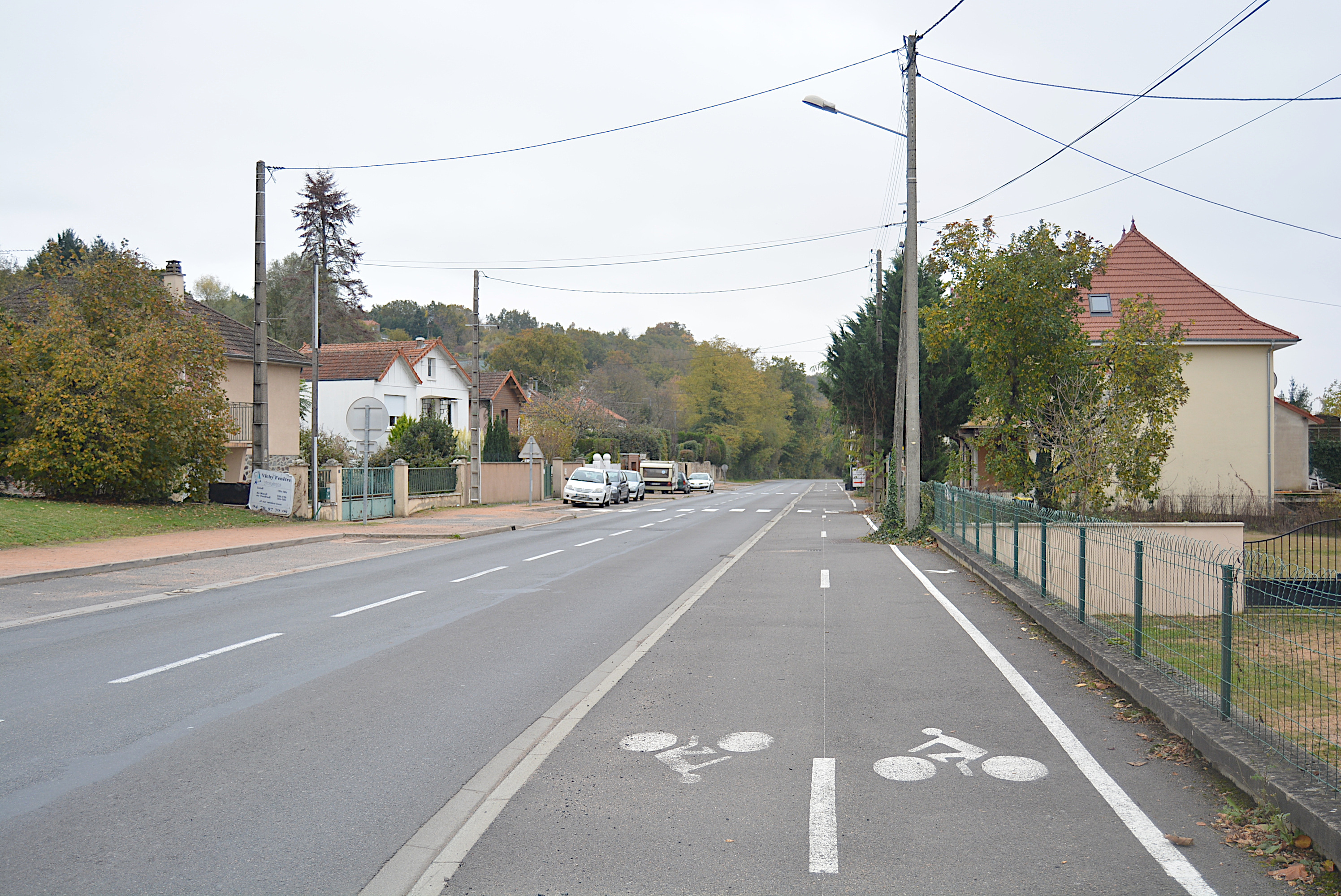
D 6E road in Pont Boutiron neighborhood toward Vichy

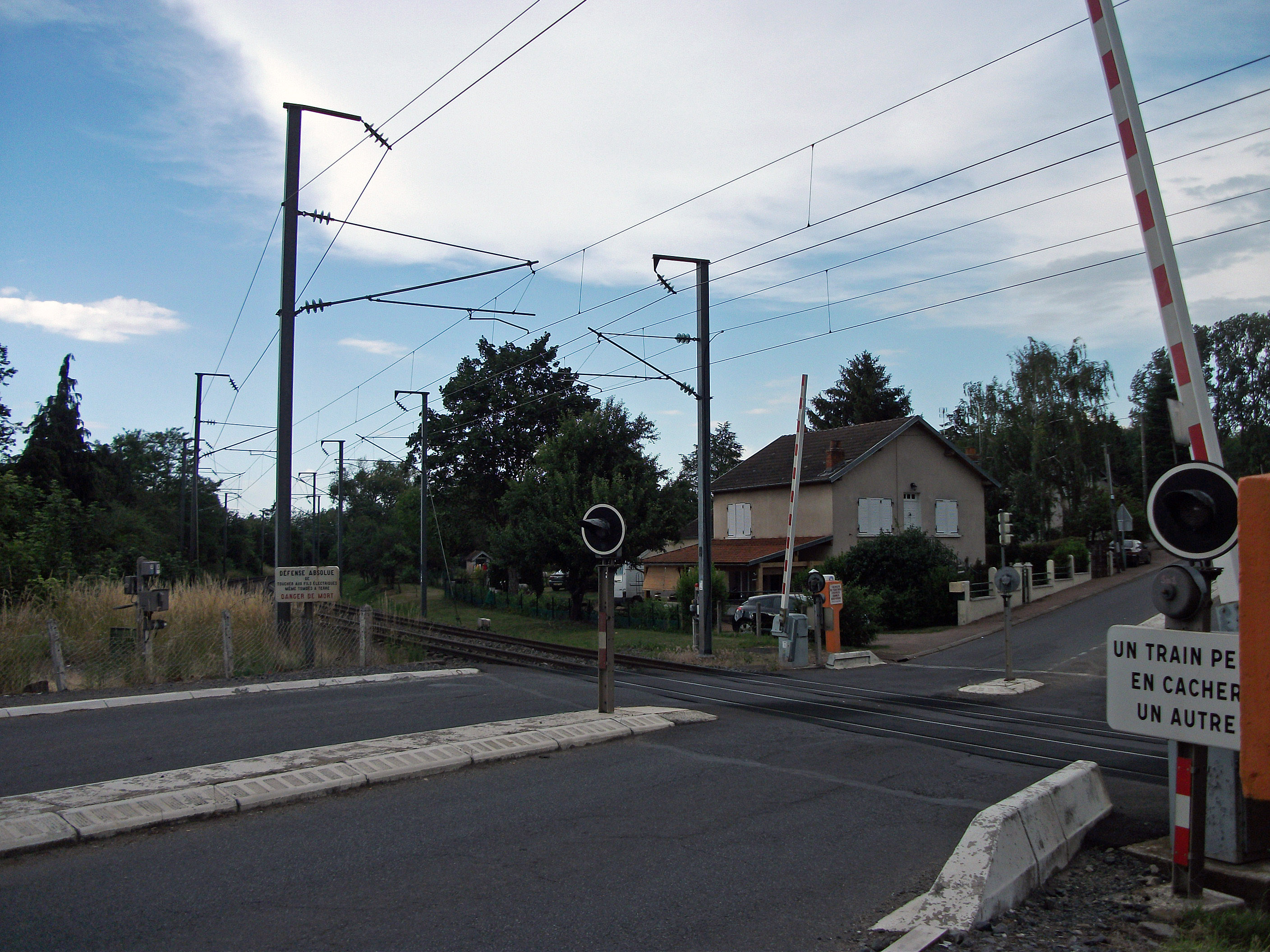
Saint-Germain-des-Fossés–Darsac railway: Level crossing #7

== History ==
Polls conducted in 2002 in Les Petits Guinards, bordering the Allier, confirmed older findings and show occupation dating back to the Magdalenian. The remains found in particular testify hunts reindeer and horse, between March and July.

The Lordship of Creuzier-le-Vieux belonged in the 16th century to the family of Montmorillon; it goes to the Bourbon-Busset by the marriage, on 21 June 1588, by Louise Montmorillon and César de Bourbon, count of Busset. The family of Bourbon-Busset remained owner Creuzier-le-Vieux until the mid-19th century.

Since the 11th century to the years 1950-1960, the hills around Vichy (including those of Creuzier-le-Vieux) were covered with vines ("old Vichy vineyard").

== Administration ==
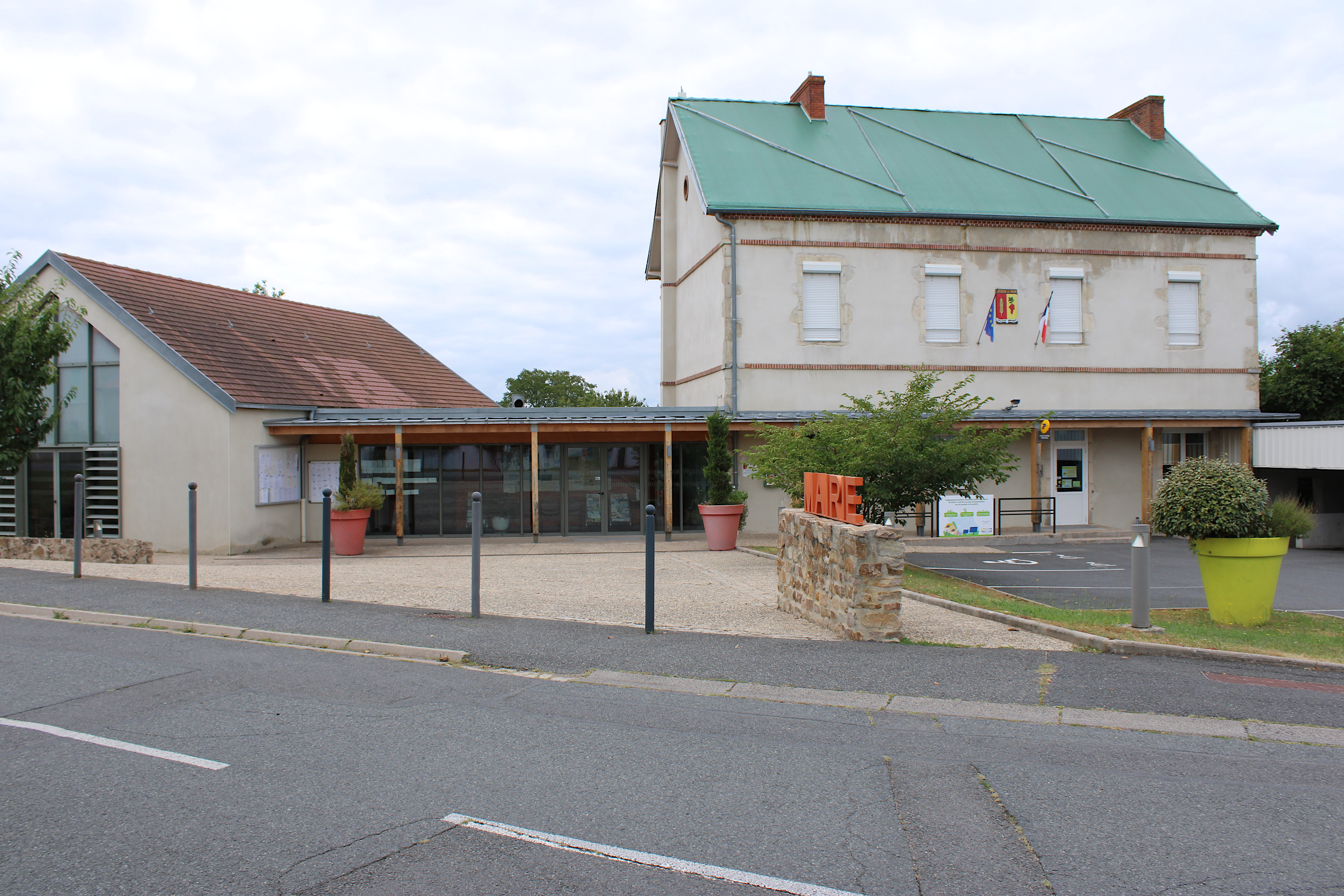
Town hall.

List of successive mayors (incomplete):

- October 1983–March 2001: Jean Burlaud
- March 2001–March 2014: Jean-Claude Tuloup
- March 2014 – 2020: Christian Bertin
- 2020–2026: Bernard Corre

== Population ==
Historical population
Year	Pop.	±% p.a.
1968	1,535	—
1975	1,828	+2.53%
1982	2,153	+2.37%
1990	2,751	+3.11%
1999	2,960	+0.82%
2007	3,195	+0.96%
2012	3,315	+0.74%
2017	3,304	−0.07%
2023	3,205	−0.51%
Source: INSEE

== Culture & Heritage ==
- Saint-Martin Church, surrounded by the cemetery, away from the town (heavily reworked in the 20th century on a 12th-century base). Merovingian cemetery was excavated in 1986 in the crypt of the church.
- Stronghold of the 15th century, adjoins the church (castle Lauzet). It succeeded an older castle, some vestiges remain. At this place was the seat of the lordship of Creuzier-le-Vieux.
- War Memorial 1914-1918 and 1939-1945 on the site of the church. A child sitting on a barrel shows a helmeted head. Branches of vine and grapes recall the local culture, but also symbolize the blood of sacrifice.
- Stronghold of Laudemarière heavily remodeled in the nineteenth century. The central building is flanked on one side of a house and the other a round tower with a conical roof.
- Stronghold of La Viala.
- La Seigne castle (18th century)
- Boutiron bridge (on departmental road 27, between Charmeil and Creuzier-le-Vieux, Monument historique since 2021)
- Laundry (19th century).

== See also ==
- Communes of the Allier department
