= Margaret Zattau Roan =

American music therapist (1905–1975)

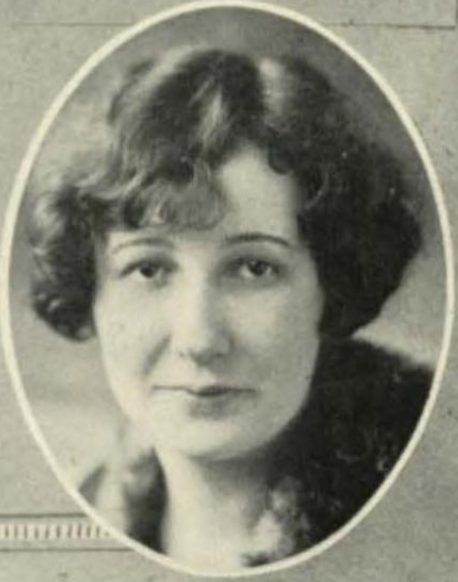
- Margaret Zattau, from a 1925 yearbook
- Born: Margaret Josephine Zattau; July 25, 1905; Maysville, Georgia
- Died: March 18, 1975 (aged 69); Atlanta, Georgia
- Occupation: Music therapist

Margaret Josephine Zattau Roan (July 25, 1905 – March 18, 1975) was an American music therapist and clubwoman, based in Atlanta, Georgia.

== Early life and education ==
Margaret Josephine Zattau was born in Maysville, Georgia, the daughter of Charles Maximillian Zattau II and Josephine M. Fowler Zattau. Her paternal grandfather, Ludwig Zattau, was born in Rhineland-Palatinate and moved to Philadelphia as a boy, in 1859. Her father was president of a printing company.

She attended Atlanta's Washington Seminary and graduated from Wesleyan College in Georgia in 1926. At Wesleyan, she earned diploma in piano and was active in many musical clubs and ensembles. She pursued further studies at the Juilliard School. She trained as a music therapist during an internship at the Eloise Hospital in Michigan, and in psychology at the Emory University and medical school.

== Career ==
Roan was a noted music therapist and music teacher based in Atlanta. She worked with disabled children at the Elks Aidmore Hospital, and as music director at the Marian Howard School, using music for physical and psychological rehabilitation; for example, helping a child to recover lung function by playing a harmonica. She also promoted music therapy for adults, especially disabled veterans. "We must all have release from the emotional tensions which build up inside us," she explained to the Atlanta Constitution in 1947, "and music can do this better than any other form of self-expression, I believe." She published books for other practitioners, including Very First Songs for Seated Rhythm (1951). She wrote about her music therapy work for the Wesleyan Alumnae Magazine in 1952. She spoke at conferences of the National Association for Music Therapy.

Roan was president of the Georgia Federation of Music Clubs, president of the DeKalb County League of Women Voters, and served on the national board of directors of the National League of Women Voters, overseeing League activities in nine Southern states and the District of Columbia. During World War II, she organized the Women's Volunteer Service in DeKalb County.

== Personal life ==
Margaret Zattau married lawyer Augustus Morrow Roan in 1926. They had two children, Charles (1928–1988) and Margaret (1937–2014). Augustus Roan died in 1959; Margaret Zattau Roan died in 1975, aged 69 years. Her papers are a major component of the Roan Family Papers at the Atlanta History Center.
