= Bost, Allier =

Bost
- Commune
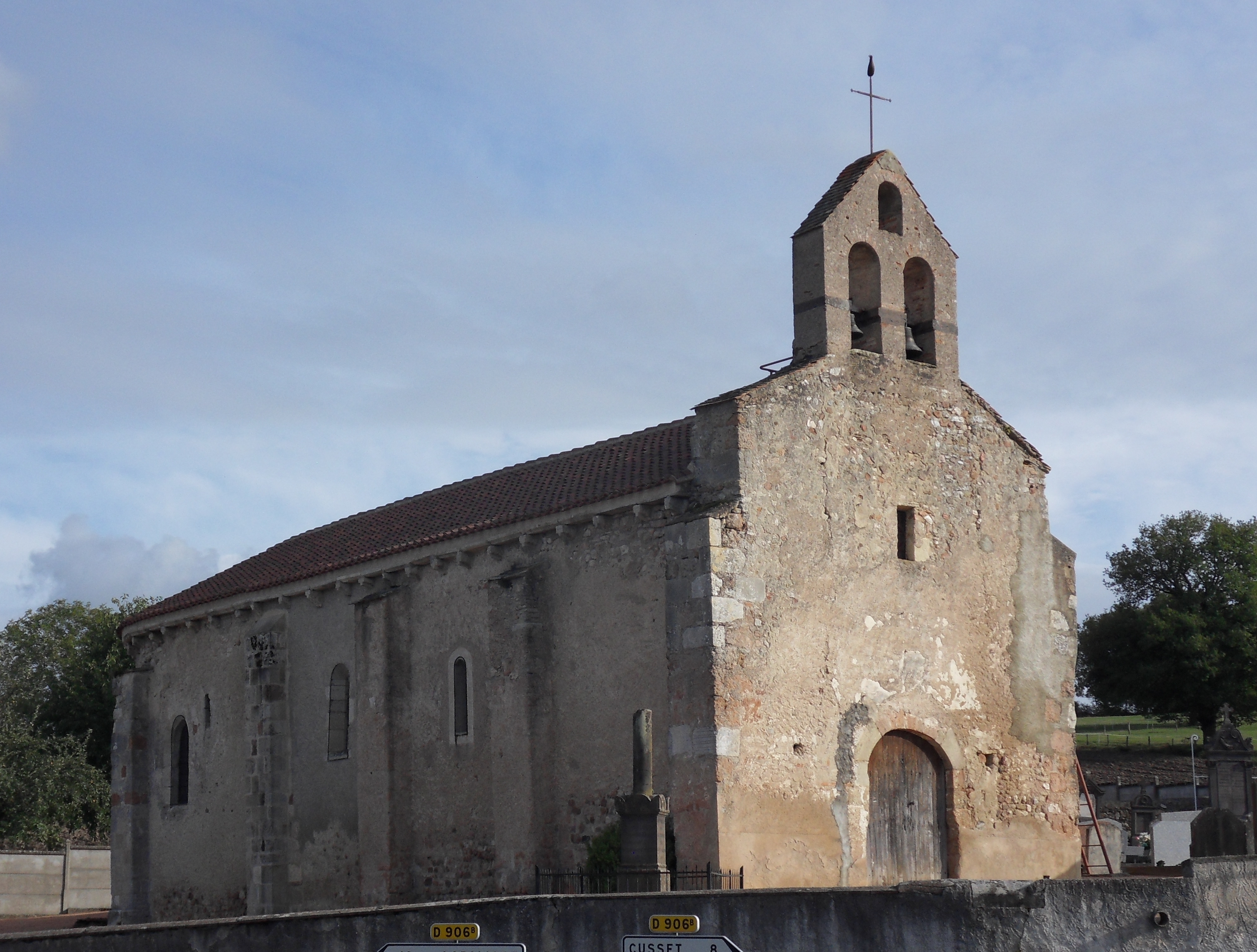
- The church in Bost
- Location of Bost
- Location within France Location within Auvergne-Rhône-Alpes
- Coordinates: 46°10′47″N 3°31′10″E
- Country: France
- Region: Auvergne-Rhône-Alpes
- Department: Allier
- Arrondissement: Vichy
- Canton: Cusset
- Intercommunality: CA Vichy Communauté

Government
  - Mayor (2026–32): Sébastien Baud
- Area^{1}: 9.48 km^{2} (3.66 sq mi)
- Elevation: 284 m (932 ft)
- Highest elevation: 429 m (1,407 ft)
- Lowest elevation: 267 m (876 ft)
- Population (2023): 183
  - Density: 19.3/km^{2} (50.0/sq mi)
- Demonym: Bostois
- Time zone: UTC+01:00 (CET)
  - Summer (DST): UTC+02:00 (CEST)
- INSEE/Postal code: 03033 /03300
- ^{1} French Land Register data, which excludes lakes, ponds, glaciers > 1 km^{2} (0.386 sq mi or 247 acres) and river estuaries.

Bost is a commune in the Allier department in central France. The town is part of the Vichy urban area and has a twelfth-century church, St-Pierre.

== Population ==
Its inhabitants are called Bostois in French.

Historical population
Year	Pop.	±% p.a.
1968	192	—
1975	163	−2.31%
1982	144	−1.75%
1990	153	+0.76%
1999	147	−0.44%
2007	171	+1.91%
2012	196	+2.77%
2017	188	−0.83%
2023	183	−0.45%
Source: INSEE

== See also ==
- Communes of the Allier department
