= Creuzier-le-Neuf =

- Commune
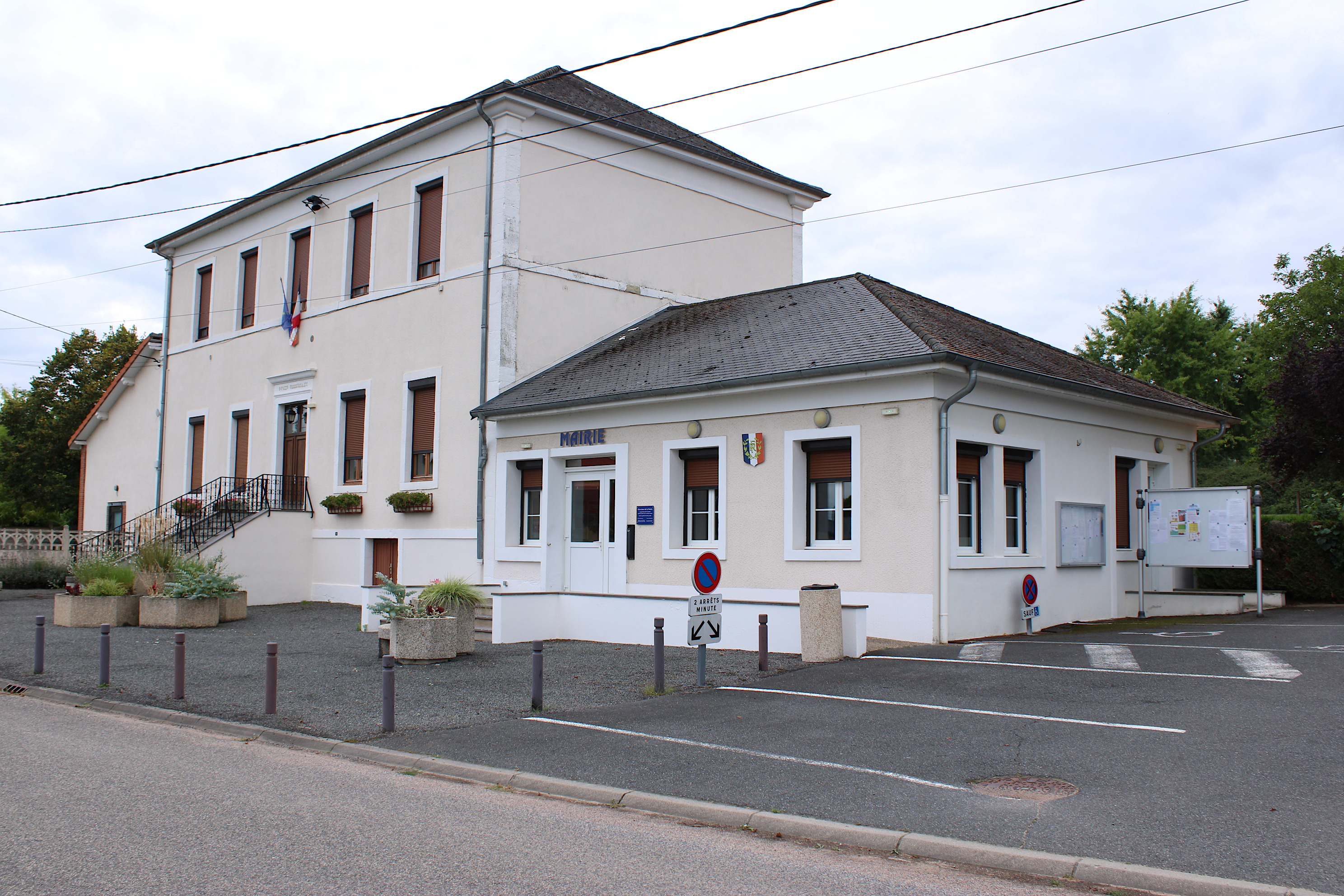
- Town hall

- Coat of arms
- Location of Creuzier-le-Neuf
- Location within France Location within Auvergne-Rhône-Alpes
- Coordinates: 46°11′00″N 3°27′02″E
- Country: France
- Region: Auvergne-Rhône-Alpes
- Department: Allier
- Arrondissement: Vichy
- Canton: Cusset
- Intercommunality: CA Vichy Communauté

Government
  - Mayor (2026–32): Thierry Laplace
- Area^{1}: 10.88 km^{2} (4.20 sq mi)
- Elevation: 300 m (980 ft)
- Highest elevation: 400 m (1,300 ft)
- Lowest elevation: 246 m (807 ft)
- Population (2023): 1,225
  - Density: 112.6/km^{2} (291.6/sq mi)
- Demonym: Creuziérois
- Time zone: UTC+01:00 (CET)
  - Summer (DST): UTC+02:00 (CEST)
- INSEE/Postal code: 03093 /03300
- ^{1} French Land Register data, which excludes lakes, ponds, glaciers > 1 km^{2} (0.386 sq mi or 247 acres) and river estuaries.

Creuzier-le-Neuf (French pronunciation: [kʁøzje lə nœf]) is a commune in the Allier department in central France.

== Geography ==
=== Location ===
Creuzier-le-Neuf is located 9 kilometers north of Vichy which it is a part of the agglomeration and about 20 km from Varennes-sur-Allier and Lapalisse.

=== Transportation ===
It is accessible by the route nationale (RN) 209 from Varennes-sur-Allier and Moulins, route départementale (RD) 67 (Vichy bypass) from suburban districts located on the left bank, RD 907 from Lapalisse, RD 77 from Saint-Germain-des-Fossés, RD 558 and RD 174.

Carpool area has been created with the participation of the community of agglomeration of Vichy Val d'Allier and the General Council of Allier. It is part of the Community scheme areas carpooling.

== Administration ==
List of successive mayors:

- 1965–2008: André Buissonniere
- 2008–2014: Jean-Pierre Mongaret
- 2014–2020: Léopold Nunez
- 2020–2026: Thierry Laplace

== Population ==
Its inhabitants are called Creuziérois in French.

Historical population
Year	Pop.	±% p.a.
1968	564	—
1975	617	+1.29%
1982	733	+2.49%
1990	937	+3.12%
1999	959	+0.26%
2007	994	+0.45%
2012	1,073	+1.54%
2017	1,166	+1.68%
2023	1,225	+0.83%
Source: INSEE

== Culture & Heritage ==
- Classic vintage home in Celzat
- Chermont ruined castle of the 18th century
- Saint-Front Church of the 11th and 12th centuries, rebuilt in the 19th century
- Gothic chapel Chermont
- Banks of Mourgon

== See also ==
- Communes of the Allier department
