= Fort Cusseta =

United States historic site in Alabama

- Cusseta, Alabama in United States
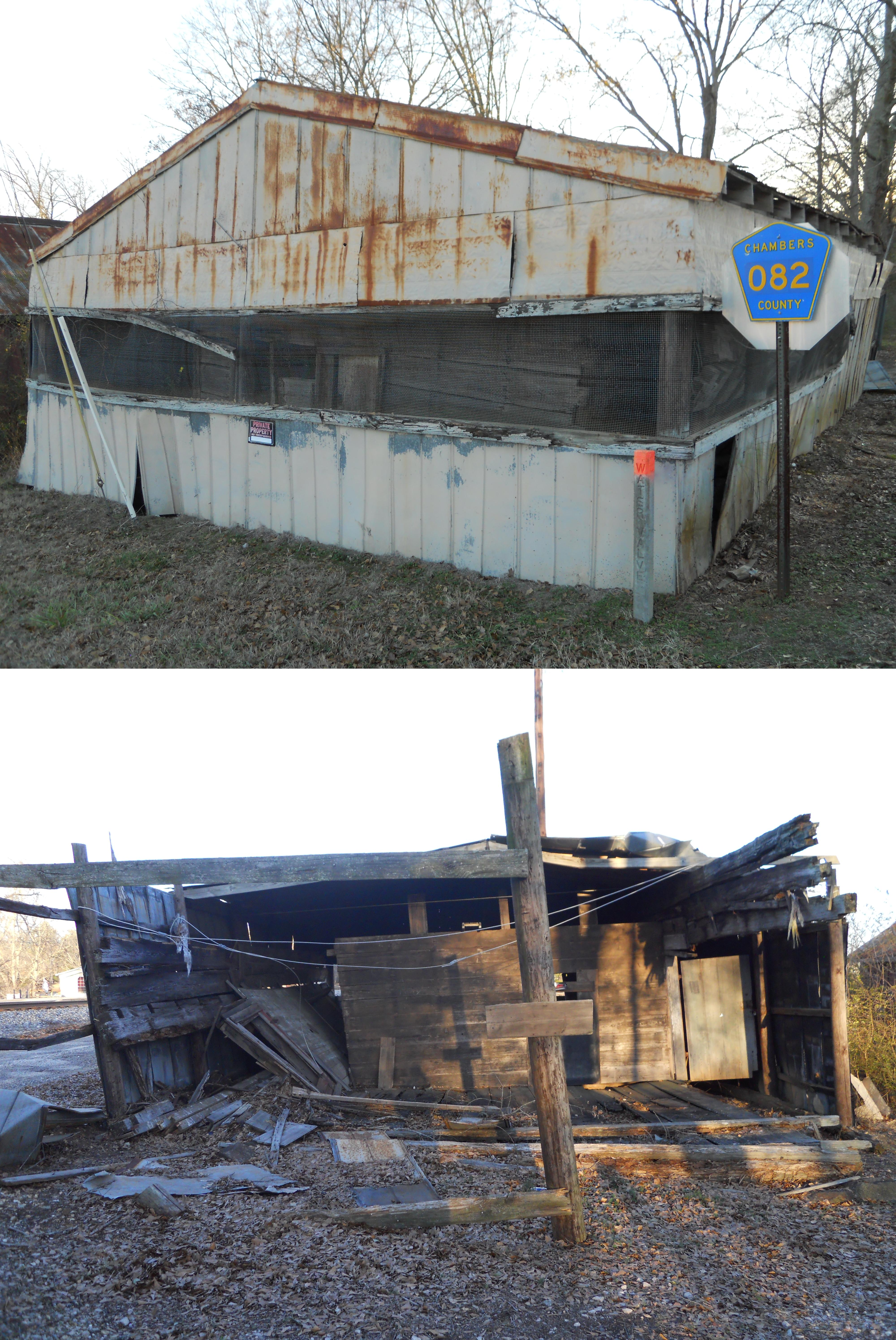
- A front and rear view of Ft. Cusseta

Site information
- Type: Stockade fort
- Owner: Private
- Controlled by: Private
- Open to the public: No
- Condition: Deteriorating

Location
- Coordinates: 32°47′04″N 85°18′20″W

Site history
- Built: 1832
- Built by: Alabama citizens
- In use: 1832-?
- Battles/wars: Creek War of 1836

Fort Cusseta /fɔrt kəˈsiːdə/ was a wooden stockade built by white settlers to protect against feared Creek Indian attacks. Its ruins still exist today within the small community of Cusseta, Alabama.

Following the signing of the Treaty of Cusseta, local settlers built a 16 feet by 30 feet hand-hewn log fort for protection from a possible uprising from the Creek village of Cusseta. Walls were four and six feet high with portholes at a height of four feet. The fort never saw any military action. Following the removal of the Indians, the fort was incorporated into a building that had various uses over the years, including that of a country store. Today the structure is vacant with its surviving heart-pine walls exposed and beginning to deteriorate.

The fort is one of the few surviving examples of a log fort in Alabama. A historical marker has been placed at the fort site.
