= Seixalbo =

Parish in Spain

Coordinates: 42°18′18″N 7°51′23″W

Seixalbo is a parish located in the south of Ourense in Spain. In 2011, there were 1,088 inhabitants (531 men and 557 women).
