= Canton of Cusset =

Coordinates: 46.15°N 3.47°E

- Canton
- Situation of the canton of Cusset in the department of Allier
- Country: France
- Region: Auvergne-Rhône-Alpes
- Department: Allier
- No. of communes: {{{nbcomm}}}
- Population (2023): 17,929
- INSEE code: 0304

The canton of Cusset is an administrative division of the Allier department, in central France. It was created at the French canton reorganisation which came into effect in March 2015. Its seat is in Cusset.

It consists of the following communes:

1. Bost
2. Creuzier-le-Neuf
3. Creuzier-le-Vieux
4. Cusset
