= Washington Seminary (Atlanta) =

Coordinates: 33°47′55″N 84°23′26″W

Washington Seminary (Atlanta, Ga.)

Information
- Religious affiliation: Christian
- President: Miss Emma Scott (last president)
- Newspaper: The Missemma
- Yearbook: Facts and Fancies
- Website: Lewis H. Beck Archives, The Westminster Schools

Washington Seminary was an independent school (Pre-First–12) in Atlanta, Georgia, United States, founded in 1878 and merged with The Westminster Schools in 1953.

== History ==
=== Misses Washington's School for Girls ===
Misses Washington's School for Girls was founded in 1878 by Anita and Lois Washington, both of whom were great nieces of George Washington's half brother, Lawrence Washington. The school's roots are in a multi-week long visit that Anita paid to her aunt, Mrs. W. S. Walker, who asked Anita to teach her daughter, Lillie Walker. As time passed, Anita began teaching the younger daughters of the house and eventually neighboring children. Anita contacted her sister Lola, to help and Misses Washington's School for Girls was born. In 1878, Lola Washington was the first president of the school while Katie Washington Bond was the first matron.[3]

The school was founded primarily as a college preparatory school for women and was located on West Peachtree Street near Baker Street.

=== Renaming to Washington Seminary ===
In 1881, the school moved to Church Street (renamed Carnegie Way) and it was in 1882 that the school was renamed to Washington Seminary. The school moved to Cain Street then to the corner of Walton and Fairlie Streets.

In 1885 Mrs. Emily Stewart purchased the school from Miss Lola Washington and moved to a large Victorian house on Walton Street. During this time Mrs. Stewart became Mrs. Robert Park and under her leadership, the school prospered.

In 1886, Washington Seminary was listed in the city directory under the aforementioned name, with its location listed as 50 Walton Street, Atlanta, Georgia, a three-story brick home formerly owned by George W. Harrison. In 1889, the school appeared in a half-page advertisement in the city directory listing the music department as part of Mr. Alfredo Barili's music school, the Art School director as Mr. H. W. Barnitz and the Principal as Mrs. Baylor Stewart.

Mrs. Park retired in 1891 and sold Washington Seminary to Mrs. Alice Chandler. By 1898, new accommodations were needed again, and it was at this time that land was purchased and a building erected on North Avenue. In 1900, the school moved to 36 East North Ave with Mrs. W. T. Chandler as principal and Llewellyn D. Scott as assistant principal.

In 1904, Mrs. Chandler died and was succeeded by her nephew and niece, Mr. Llewellyn D. Scott and Miss Emma B. Scott. Under their stewardship, new departments were added and the faculty was increased. As the enrollment grew, it was obvious that another move would be necessary.

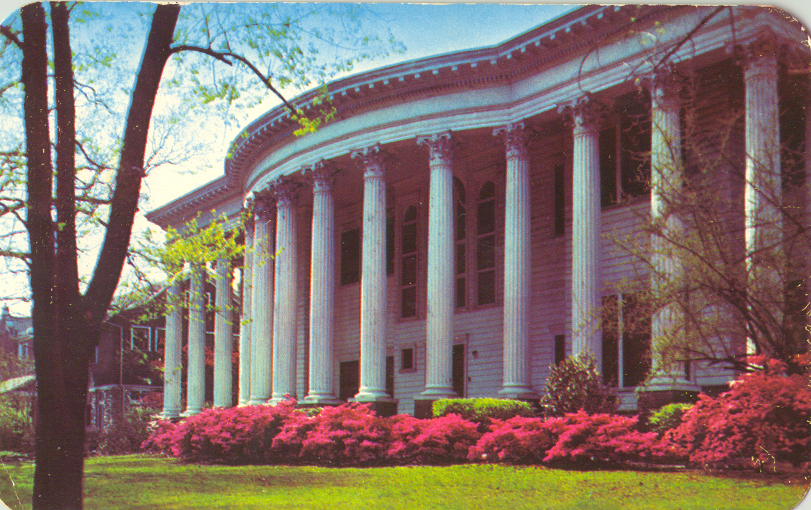
This was the main building of Washington Seminary in Atlanta, Georgia, on Peachtree Street, in use from 1912-1953.

In 1912, the school moved to an estate formerly known as La Colina, a name bestowed upon the land by Colonel Clifford L. Anderson, founder of Trust Company of Georgia who was also a lawyer and state legislator. The large property enabled them to add a modern school building to the grounds. Mr. Llewellyn Scott, with the help of his sister, Miss Emma Scott, directed the school with great success for the next 25 years.

In 1917, the school hosted its first annual May Day event.

Following Llewellyn D. Scott's death in 1937, his sister Emma Scott became the head of the school.

=== Merger with the Westminster Schools ===
In 1953, the school merged with Westminster Schools, a co-educational school.

The "Home Building," originally constructed in 1895, housed the school until 1953. In 1955, the building was torn down and replaced with the Riviera Motel.

== Presidents ==
- 1878-1885: Miss Lola Washington
- 1885-1891: Mrs. Emily Stewart (later remarried and became Mrs. Robert Park)
- 1891-1904: Mrs. Alice Chandler
- 1904-1937: Mr. Llewellyn D. Scott and Miss Emma B. Scott (brother and sister)
- 1937-1953: Miss Emma Scott

== Notable Figures ==
- Anita Washington, one of the schools's founders, was a member of multiple social clubs as well as being an especially devoted member of St. Phillip's Episcopal Church. She graduated from St. Mary's College in Raleigh, North Carolina.
- Julia Collier Harris, writer, editor and journliast, graduated from Washington Seminary circa 1892.
- Margaret Mitchell, American author and journalist, graduated from Washington Seminary in 1918.
- Dorothy Kirby, sportscaster and golf champion, graduated from Washington Seminary in 1938.
- Margaret Zattau Roan, music therapist and clubwoman in Atlanta, graduated from Washington Seminary circa 1921
- Ann Marshall Davis (née Emmert), of Atlanta, graduated from Washington Seminary in 1947 and earned recognition across California as a book dramatist.

== Archival Collections ==
There are two main locations for archival research on Washington Seminary. The first is the Lewis H. Beck Archives of The Westminster Schools, while additional materials can be found at the Atlanta History Center.
