= Cusset =

- Commune
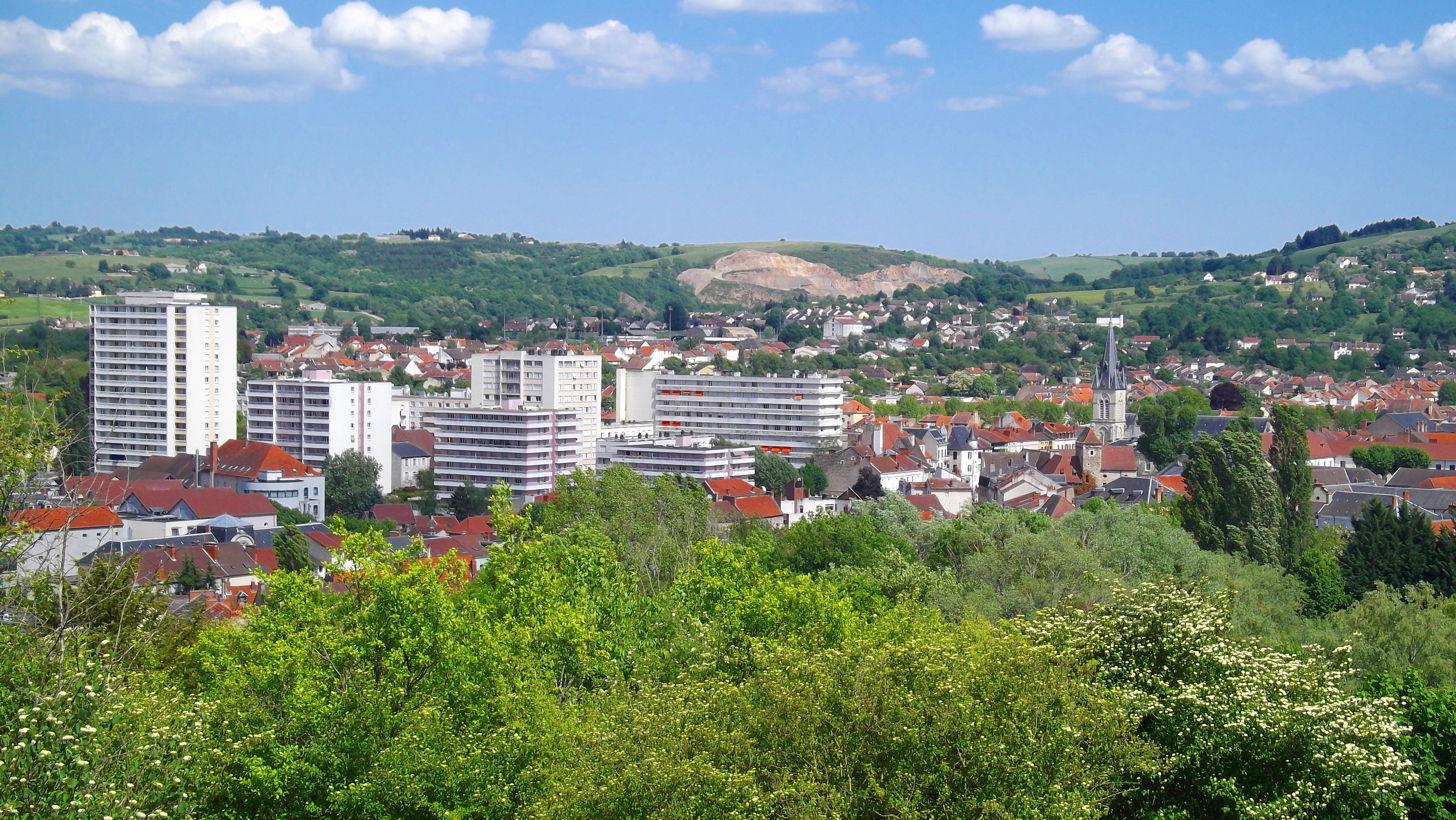
- Cusset from Montbeton neighborhood

- Coat of arms
- Location of Cusset
- Location within France Location within Auvergne-Rhône-Alpes
- Coordinates: 46°08′07″N 3°27′26″E
- Country: France
- Region: Auvergne-Rhône-Alpes
- Department: Allier
- Arrondissement: Vichy
- Canton: Cusset
- Intercommunality: CA Vichy Communauté

Government
  - Mayor (2026–32): Jean-Sébastien Laloy
- Area^{1}: 31.93 km^{2} (12.33 sq mi)
- Elevation: 310 m (1,020 ft)
- Highest elevation: 483 m (1,585 ft)
- Lowest elevation: 255 m (837 ft)
- Population (2023): 13,316
  - Density: 417.0/km^{2} (1,080/sq mi)
- Time zone: UTC+01:00 (CET)
  - Summer (DST): UTC+02:00 (CEST)
- INSEE/Postal code: 03095 /03300
- Website: www.ville-cusset.com
- ^{1} French Land Register data, which excludes lakes, ponds, glaciers > 1 km^{2} (0.386 sq mi or 247 acres) and river estuaries.

Cusset is a commune in the department of Allier, in the central French region of Auvergne. Situated in the foothills of the Bourbonnaise Mountains, the city is a suburb of Vichy and ranks fourth in population for the department.

== Population ==
Historical population

Year	Pop.	±% p.a.
1793	3,827	—
1800	3,945	+0.43%
1806	4,547	+2.40%
1821	3,924	−0.98%
1831	4,910	+2.27%
1836	5,093	+0.73%
1841	5,138	+0.18%
1846	5,476	+1.28%
1851	5,510	+0.12%
1856	5,709	+0.71%
1861	6,113	+1.38%
1866	6,575	+1.47%
1872	6,279	−0.76%
1876	6,308	+0.12%
1881	6,330	+0.07%
1886	6,762	+1.33%
1891	6,454	−0.93%
1896	6,441	−0.04%
1901	6,598	+0.48%

Year	Pop.	±% p.a.
1906	6,719	+0.36%
1911	6,941	+0.65%
1921	6,598	−0.51%
1926	7,672	+3.06%
1931	8,732	+2.62%
1936	9,026	+0.66%
1946	9,728	+0.75%
1954	10,405	+0.84%
1962	11,468	+1.22%
1968	13,117	+2.26%
1975	13,685	+0.61%
1982	14,355	+0.69%
1990	13,567	−0.70%
1999	13,385	−0.15%
2007	13,358	−0.03%
2012	13,497	+0.21%
2017	12,661	−1.27%
2023	13,316	+0.84%

Source: EHESS and INSEE (1968-2023)

== History ==
As early as the 4th century BC, a Celtic site preceded and overlooked the current city. The oppidum of Viermeux, an Arverni oppidum intended to guard the northern entrance to the Limagne, consisted of two plateaus covering 60 hectares but only one was occupied in any numbers.

=== French Revolution ===
On the 5th December 1793 during the Dechristianization campaign a 10th century statue of the Virgin was publicly burnt although the hands were salvaged.

== Geography ==
=== Location ===
Located on the Sichon River, tributary of the Allier river, in the foothills of the Bourbonnaise Mountain, at an elevation of approximately 980 feet on top of the Mount Béton, Cusset is annexed to Vichy.

The city includes fifty or so Lieux-dit (part of a municipality nominated because of an historical particularity), the most important are Presle, Puy-Besseau, the Bartins, Champcourt, Chantegrelet, Chassignol and Viermeux.

Cusset is a part of the arrondissement of Vichy, for many years it was the capital of a unique canton until 1985, at which point a decree separated this canton into two parts : Northern Cusset and Southern Cusset. Following the boundary changes of 2014, only one canton shall remain in 2015.

The municipality is located, as the crow flies, at an equal distance between the administrative centers of the department of Moulins to the north and of the region of Clermont-Ferrand to the southeast (approx. 30 miles).

=== Geology and relief ===
The surface area of the municipality 7890 acres, its elevation varies between 837 and 1584 feet. The low-lying areas are located near Vichy (built residences on the Sichon riverside) whereas the high-elevation sectors are located to the east (Chassignol, Meunière, Viermeux, Les Acarins)

=== Hydrography ===
The Sichon passes through the municipality, tributary of the Allier river; the Bourbonnaise Mountain is the source of other waterways which cross the municipality ( le Jolan, le Rebusset, l’Abrion, le Dalbot).

=== Climate ===
The climate in this region is continental. The climate records come from the nearest weather station located in Charmeil, close to the airport. In 2011 the city was exposed to the sun for a total of 88 days (2096 hours), these results are very close to the national average. The municipality registered a rainfall of 23 inches and the maximal speed of the wind reached 52 mph.

== Culture ==
Star Wars themed fan convention Générations Star Wars et Science Fiction occurs every year in the city's main auditorium Espace Chambon.

== Twin towns — Sister cities ==
Cusset is twinned with:

- Neusäß, Germany

== See also ==
- Communes of the Allier department

=== External links ===
- Town hall website (in French)
