= Replacement =

Replacement(s) or Replace may refer to:

== Music ==
- The Replacements (band), an American alternative rock band

== Film and television ==
- The Replacements (film), a 2000 American sports comedy
- The Replacement (2021 film), a 2021 Spanish thriller film
- The Replacement (TV series), a 2017 British drama series
- The Replacements (TV series), an American animated series 2006–2009
- "The Replacements" (American Horror Story), a 2013 television episode
- "Replacements" (Band of Brothers), a 2001 television episode
- "The Replacement" (Buffy the Vampire Slayer), a 2000 television episode
- "The Replacement" (Doctors), a 2004 television episode
- "Replacements" (Star Wars: The Bad Batch), a 2021 television episode

== Video games ==
- Replaced (video game), a 2026 action-platform game

== Computing ==
- Text replacement (disambiguation)
- String replacement
- Replacement character, a replacement, a substitute character replacing a missing from available fonts
- Replace (command), a command used on DOS, Microsoft Windows and related operating systems

== Mathematics ==
- Axiom schema of replacement, a schema of axioms in Zermelo–Fraenkel set theory
- Replacement rates, in population fertility measurement
- Sampling (statistics), the selection of a subset of individuals from a statistical population

== Other uses ==
- Great Replacement, a white-nationalist, far-right conspiracy theory
- Hip replacement, a surgical procedure
- Knee replacement, a surgical procedure
- "Replacements" (short story), a story by Lisa Tuttle
- Replacements, Ltd., an American retailer
- The Replacement, a 2008 play by Jacob M. Appel

== See also ==
- Replacement level (disambiguation)
- Replaceable (disambiguation)
