= Star Wars: Maul – Shadow Lord =

2026 animated series

- Genre: Action-adventure; Science fiction
- Created by: Dave Filoni
- Based on: Star Wars and characters by George Lucas
- Developed by: Dave Filoni; Matt Michnovetz
- Voices of: Sam Witwer
- Composers: Kevin Kiner; Sean Kiner; Deana Kiner
- Country of origin: United States
- Original language: English
- No. of seasons: 1
- No. of episodes: 10

Production
- Executive producers: Dave Filoni; Athena Yvette Portillo; Matt Michnovetz; Brad Rau; Carrie Beck; Josh Rimes
- Running time: 23–31 minutes
- Production companies: Lucasfilm; Lucasfilm Animation

Original release
- Network: Disney+
- Release: April 6, 2026 – present

Related
- Star Wars: The Clone Wars

Star Wars: Maul – Shadow Lord is an American animated television series created by Dave Filoni for the streaming service Disney+. It is part of the Star Wars franchise, taking place after the events of Star Wars: The Clone Wars (2008–2020), and follows former Sith lord Maul during the reign of the Galactic Empire.

Sam Witwer voices Maul, reprising his role from The Clone Wars and other Star Wars media. Maul – Shadow Lord was announced in April 2025, a year after Witwer joined to provide insight on the character as well as his voice. The series is produced by Lucasfilm Animation, with Matt Michnovetz as head writer, Brad Rau as supervising director, and Filoni, Michnovetz, Rau, Athena Yvette Portillo, Carrie Beck, and Josh Rimes as executive producers. It tells a serialized story and explores questions about Maul that Filoni and Witwer discussed while working on previous series. The animation, provided by CGCG, Inc. and Lucasfilm Animation's internal team, has a similar style to The Clone Wars but is more stylized, reflecting Maul's character and the setting of the planet Janix.

The 10-episode first season premiered on Disney+ on April 6, 2026, with two episodes released each week until May 4. A second season is set to premiere in 2027.

== Premise ==
Around a year after the Clone Wars, former Sith lord Maul rebuilds his criminal syndicate and seeks a new apprentice on the planet Janix during the reign of the Galactic Empire.

== Cast and characters ==
=== Starring ===
- Sam Witwer as Maul:
  A former Sith lord from the planet Dathomir who is trying to find his place following the end of the Clone Wars. Witwer said the series explores a lot of questions about the character and is told from his perspective. He added that the character has relatable feelings but does not have "the tools to express those. All he has in front of him are supervillain tools." Witwer compared this to the character Gollum from J. R. R. Tolkien's novel The Lord of the Rings (1954–55). Executive producer Athena Yvette Portillo described Maul as a "seemingly eternal villain" similar to Michael Myers from the Halloween franchise and Jason Voorhees from the Friday the 13th franchise.
  - Witwer also provided the voices for Darth Sidious, the Emperor and Maul's former Sith master; and young Savage Opress, Maul's brother.

=== Recurring ===
==== Introduced in other Star Wars media ====
- Vanessa Marshall as Rook Kast: One of Maul's Mandalorian allies from the Clone Wars
- A. J. LoCascio as Marrok: A Jedi-hunting Inquisitor known as the First Brother

==== Introduced in season one ====
- Chris Diamantopoulos as Looti Vario:
  A fast-talking Aleena crime lord who betrayed Maul. Vario uses a mechanical suit to make up for his small stature, which Diamantopoulos described as "classic overcompensation. If he was on our planet, he'd be a 60-year-old guy with a combover, 4-foot-9 driving a convertible Ferrari." Taking inspiration from Diamantopoulos stroking his beard during recording, the animators gave Vario a tic where he strokes his gill-like facial fins.
- David W. Collins as Spybot:
  An unconventional droid who serves Maul. Collins, the series' sound designer, described the character as "a jaguar or panther meets a droid meets a spider"; in one scene, Spybot purrs when being petted by Maul. Collins tried various voices before settling on an homage to actor Peter Lorre which is then heavily manipulated by the sound team. He improvised many lines for the character.
- Dennis Haysbert as Eeko-Dio Daki:
  A fugitive Jedi and Devon Izara's master, who is still trying to follow the teachings of the Jedi Order. Daki is a Mosyk, a new lizard-like species created for the series, and was nicknamed "Dino Jedi" by the production. Haysbert was already a big fan of Star Wars and the franchise's previous animated series when he was approached about the role, and said it was his "destiny to play a Jedi Knight".
- Gideon Adlon as Devon Izara:
  A Twi'lek Jedi who is on the run following Order 66, and is targeted by Maul as a potential new apprentice. Head writer Matt Michnovetz said Devon is realizing that the future she expected is no longer possible and she needs to adapt. Portillo said there is an innocence to the character, who is "conflicted between right and wrong", while supervising director Brad Rau said Adlon's performance helped ground the series in reality.
- Richard Ayoade as Two-Boots: Brander Lawson's police droid partner. 2B0T, called "Two-Boots" for short, stands out from other droids by wearing actual boots.
- Sam Corlett as Reb: A Janix police officer
- Steve Blum as Icarus: A Dathomiri Nightbrother who serves Maul
- Wagner Moura as Brander Lawson:
  A police detective on Janix who is part of local law enforcement, separate from the Galactic Empire. Rau said Moura brought "this mix of gravitas and grounded realism" with his performance. Moura was drawn to the character's relationship with his son, Rylee, and his struggles to balance work with family.
- Charlie Bushnell as Rylee Lawson: The son of Brander Lawson, who plays botekin, the Star Wars version of lacrosse
- Keiko Agena as Klyce: The police chief on Janix
- Alastair Murden as Blake: An Imperial lieutenant who is responsible for Janix after Maul's presence is reported

=== Guests ===
==== Introduced in other Star Wars media ====
- Stephen Stanton as Marg Krim: Leader of the Pyke Syndicate
- Clancy Brown as Savage Opress: Maul's brother who was killed by Sidious
- Ewan McGregor as Obi-Wan Kenobi: A Jedi who sliced Maul in half during a duel years ago
- Scott Whyte as Dryden Vos:
  The ambitious second-in-command of Crimson Dawn. Whyte took inspiration from Paul Bettany's performance as Vos in the film Solo: A Star Wars Story (2018) as well as his interviews during that film's promotion.

==== Introduced in season one ====
- Dave Fennoy as Scorn: A Dathomiri Nightbrother who serves Maul
- John Carroll Lynch as Nico Deemis: A crime lord who betrayed Maul
- Avery Kidd Waddell as Wade: A Janix police officer
- Pamela Adlon as Rheena Sul: An underworld contact of Brander Lawson's. Adlon is the mother of Devon's actress Gideon Adlon.
- Ben Diskin as Kebris: A Mandalorian mercenary who grows tired of losing money while working for Maul
- Tamlyn Tomita as Drea Lawson: The former wife of Brander Lawson and Rylee's mother who works for the Empire

Also appearing in non-speaking roles are the Eleventh Brother, another Inquisitor; and Darth Vader, Sidious's new Sith apprentice.

== Episodes ==
No.	Title	Directed by	Written by	Original release date
1	"Chapter 1: The Dark Revenge"	Steward Lee, Saul Ruiz & Nathaniel Villanueva	Matt Michnovetz	April 6, 2026
Former Sith lord Maul seeks vengeance against criminals who betrayed him after the Clone Wars. On Janix, Maul's followers rob a bank owned by crime lord Nico Deemis. Janix Tactical Defense Force (TDF) captain Brander Lawson investigates with his droid partner Two-Boots and chooses not to report Maul's involvement to the Galactic Empire. Fugitive Jedi Devon Izara is arrested for shoplifting and her master, Eeko-Dio Daki, tells her to cooperate. Deemis blames rival crime lord Looti Vario for the robbery. Vario kills Deemis and is arrested by Lawson. Maul attacks the TDF precinct to get to Vario, who offers to help.
2	"Chapter 2: Sinister Schemes"	Saul Ruiz	Matt Michnovetz	April 6, 2026
Maul and his followers escape from the TDF, taking Vario and Devon with them, and go to their hideout in the lower levels of Janix. Maul tells Devon that she was indoctrinated by the Jedi and must now adapt to the new state of the galaxy after the Empire destroyed the Jedi Order. Lawson struggles with being overworked and not being able to spend time with his son, Rylee. He meets with a criminal contact, Rheena Sul, for information on Maul and is secretly followed by Daki. Vario provides Maul with a plan to draw out Pyke Syndicate leader Marg Krim. Maul encourages Devon to escape from her prison if she wishes to, and she uses the Force to break out of her cell.
3	"Chapter 3: Whispers in the Unknown"	Steward Lee	Julia Cooperman	April 13, 2026
Devon attempts to fight Maul with half of his double-bladed lightsaber. Shrouded in darkness, Maul taunts and questions her. Lawson gives the information he learned about Maul to Two-Boots and then attends Rylee's sport match, where he is approached by Daki. Two-Boots discovers a confrontation between the Pykes and Vario's men over a shipment, only to be ambushed by Maul's followers who destroy the shipment. Lawson leaves Rylee's match early when notified of the attack by Two-Boots, who advocates for calling the Empire. As Devon attempts to escape, Maul reveals himself and reclaims his lightsaber before letting her leave.
4	"Chapter 4: Pride and Vengeance"	Nathaniel Villanueva	Amanda Rose Muñoz	April 13, 2026
Vario brings Maul to a meeting with Krim on Oba Diah, where Maul kills Krim and installs a new Pyke leader who is loyal to him. On Janix, Devon reunites with Daki and convinces him to help Lawson defeat Maul. Daki sends the location of Maul's hideout to Lawson, who takes a TDF squad to raid the hideout. Maul offers to protect Janix from the Empire if Lawson agrees to leave them be, but Lawson refuses and a firefight breaks out. Daki and Devon arrive and duel Maul, but he overpowers them despite Daki damaging one of his cybernetic legs. Maul and his followers retreat when reinforcements arrive. Two-Boots informs the Empire of Maul's presence.
5	"Chapter 5: Inquisition"	Saul Ruiz & Tatyana Drewry Carvin	Jennifer Corbett	April 20, 2026
Imperial forces led by Lieutenant Blake and the Jedi-hunting Inquisitor Marrok occupy Janix city, cutting off Devon and Daki as they attempt to escape. Despite the protests of his second-in-command, Rook Kast, Maul decides to stay in hopes of making Devon his apprentice. Lawson is questioned by Marrok and claims that he first encountered Maul during the firefight. Rylee contacts his mother Drea, who works for the Empire and tells Rylee to cooperate. Marrok investigates the scene of the firefight and sees evidence of Maul's duel with Devon and Daki. Blake allows Lawson to go home, where he finds Devon and Daki seeking refuge with Rylee.
6	"Chapter 6: Night of the Hunted"	Steward Lee	Christopher Yost	April 20, 2026
Marrok appears at Lawson's apartment and duels Daki and Devon. The pair steal an Imperial gunship and escape with Lawson and Rylee, but they are chased through the city by other gunships and are shot down. Lawson takes them to meet Sul and asks her for help escaping the planet, but the Empire soon arrives at Sul's casino. Lawson and Daki hold off Imperial Stormtroopers while Devon and Rylee escape to a train platform. They are pursued by Marrok, who duels with Devon on the train. Maul comes to their aid, helping Devon overpower Marrok until they can get away from him. Marrok contacts his master to confirm Maul's presence and that of the Jedi.
7	"Chapter 7: Call to Oblivion"	Nathaniel Villanueva	Julia Cooperman	April 27, 2026
Maul leads Devon and Rylee to his current hideout and plans to escape from Janix on his starship. The Empire arrives and Stormtroopers capture Rylee. Devon escapes during the fighting and reunites with Daki and Lawson, who try to contact Two-Boots about Rylee. The droid is reluctant to abet the fugitives and does not answer. Maul duels with Marrok and a second Inquisitor, the Eleventh Brother, while some of his Mandalorian mercenaries attempt to flee in the starship; they are shot down by Imperial gunships. Struggling with his damaged leg, Maul feigns surrender before collapsing a cavern roof, forcing the Inquisitors to retreat.
8	"Chapter 8: The Creeping Fear"	Saul Ruiz	Jennifer Corbett	April 27, 2026
Kast leads Maul's remaining followers and Vario to a rendezvous point. Maul continues to struggle with his leg and experiences hallucinations of his past, including his brutal training by the Sith lord Darth Sidious, who is now the Emperor and the one who killed Maul's brother Savage Opress. Two-Boots decides to free Rylee and the pair join Lawson, Devon, and Daki outside the precinct. They go to meet with Sul, who has a ship, but the Jedi sense that this is a trap; Sul is being held at gunpoint by Blake and the Inquisitors. The group turn back before they are caught, and Sul blows up the ship with herself and Blake beside it. Maul reunites with his followers.
9	"Chapter 9: Strange Allies"	Steward Lee	Christopher Yost	May 4, 2026
Dryden Vos of the crime syndicate Crimson Dawn offers Maul safe passage off Janix in exchange for becoming Crimson Dawn's new leader. Maul sends a mental message to Devon and she leads the rest of their group to a meeting point where Maul proposes an alliance to get off the planet. Lawson suggests an underground route to the rendezvous point outside the city. Coming to an acidic river of toxic waste, the group slowly crosses as the Inquisitors catch up with them. Maul holds the Inquisitors off long enough for the others to cross, and then joins them. Outside the city they are confronted by the Inquisitors' master, Darth Vader, who kills Kast.
10	"Chapter 10: The Dark Lord"	Nathaniel Villanueva	Matt Michnovetz & Brad Rau	May 4, 2026
Maul and the Jedi engage Vader and the Inquisitors while Vario, Two-Boots, and the Lawsons make their way to the rendezvous point, which is full of Imperial troops. During the fighting, Daki pushes Marrok off a bridge. With Devon distracted fighting the Eleventh Brother, Maul decides to leave Daki to be killed by Vader. Devon sees her master die and is overcome with rage; Maul helps her escape from the Inquisitor and Vader, and promises to train her so they can have revenge. Lawson sacrifices himself to allow Rylee, Two-Boots, and Vario to reach Vos's ship, joined by Maul and Devon. As the ship leaves Janix, Devon agrees to become Maul's apprentice.

== Production ==
=== Development ===
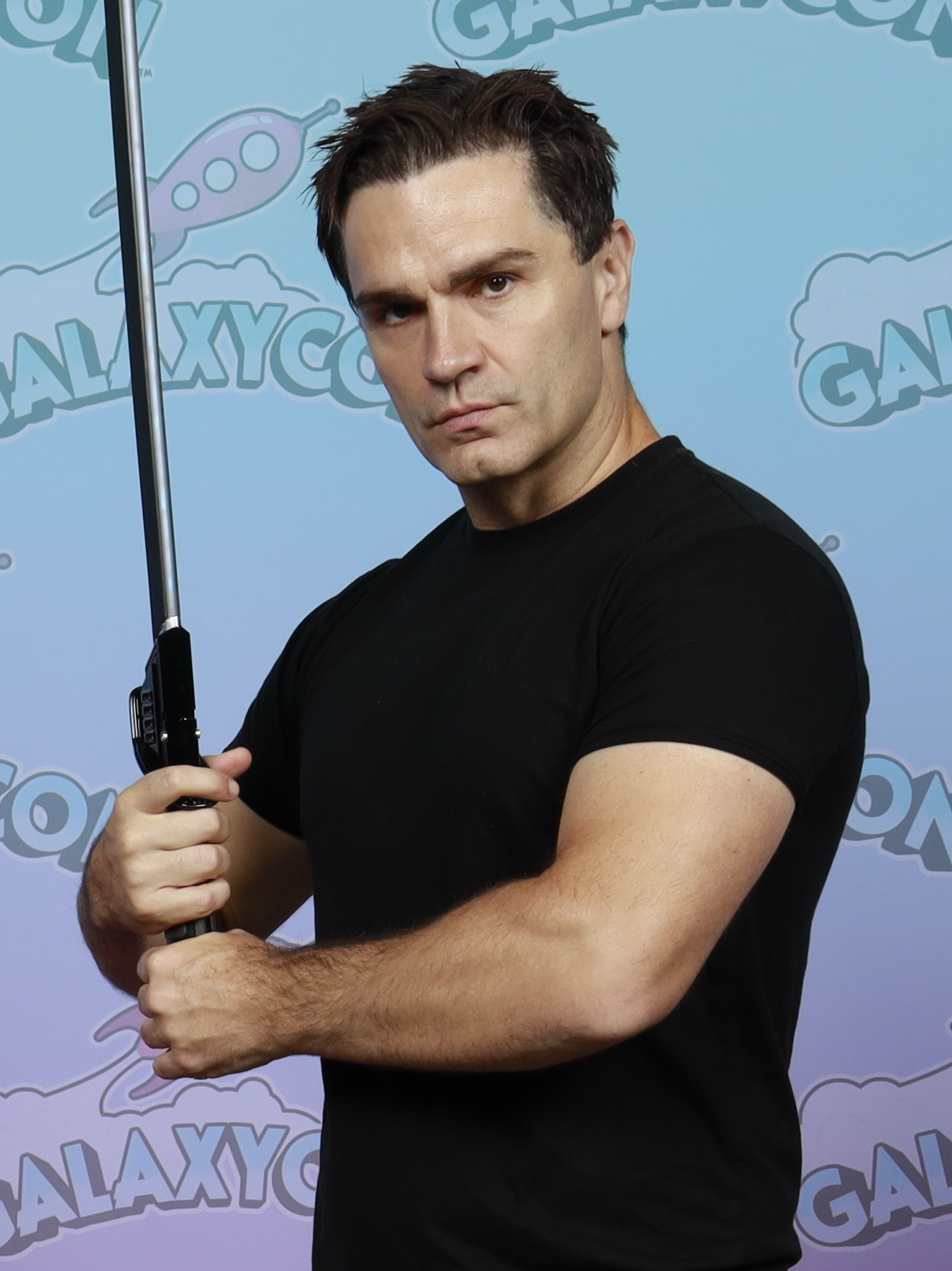
Sam Witwer reprises his role as Maul from previous Star Wars media, and was consulted during production.

When Star Wars: The Bad Batch (2021–2024), a spin-off from the animated series Star Wars: The Clone Wars (2008–2020), came to an end, supervising director Brad Rau hinted that another continuation of the "Clone Wars universe" was in development. During a panel celebrating the 20th anniversary of Lucasfilm Animation at Star Wars Celebration Japan in April 2025, Lucasfilm chief creative officer Dave Filoni and animation vice president Athena Yvette Portillo announced the studio's next animated series to be Star Wars: Maul – Shadow Lord, focused on the Star Wars character Maul. Introduced in the film Star Wars: Episode I – The Phantom Menace (1999), Maul was originally portrayed physically by Ray Park and voiced by Peter Serafinowicz. The character was presumed dead until he was brought back in The Clone Wars voiced by Sam Witwer, who reprised the role in the follow-up animated series Star Wars Rebels (2014–2018) and the live-action film Solo: A Star Wars Story (2018). Witwer was confirmed to be returning for Maul – Shadow Lord during the Celebration panel.

While working on the previous Star Wars animated series, Witwer and Filoni—the supervising director for The Clone Wars and the first two seasons of Rebels—discussed different ideas about Maul that Filoni felt would be better explored in his own project. Filoni began work on Maul – Shadow Lord after Lucasfilm Animation staff returned to work following the COVID-19 pandemic, and was joined by many creatives from the previous series including Rau as supervising director and Matt Michnovetz as head writer. Witwer was brought onto the series a year before it was announced, and was more closely involved in development than with the previous series, discussing the character, reviewing scripts, and providing input on early animation. Witwer described Rau as Filoni's "apprentice" and explained that Filoni created the series but had more of an oversight role where he would only be involved with day-to-day production at rare times. Filoni is credited as creator, co-developer with Michnovetz, and executive producer with Michnovetz, Rau, Portillo, Carrie Beck, and Josh Rimes.

Ahead of the first season's premiere in April 2026, and soon after he was named co-CEO of Lucasfilm, Filoni said a second season was in development.

=== Writing ===
The series takes place around a year after Maul's defeat at the hands of Ahsoka Tano at the end of the Clone Wars, as depicted in the final season of The Clone Wars. This is years before Maul's story comes to an end during the events of Rebels. Maul – Shadow Lord tells a serialized, 10-episode story which Michnovetz described as fast-paced and action-packed. He felt Maul was the perfect character to "drive us through" such a story. The writers included homages to the classic film serials which inspired Star Wars creator George Lucas.

Witwer said the series finds Maul "dusting himself off a bit" following the end of the Clone Wars and during the beginning of the Galactic Empire's reign. Witwer and the crew reviewed the character's previous appearances to ensure they were exploring questions about him that had not been answered before—including some that Witwer already knew the answer to—such as: why did Maul not reveal that his former master Palpatine was secretly a Sith lord, seemingly remaining loyal to Palpatine despite being discarded and replaced; how does a character who is "from a time of knights and magic" feel about the Empire "sucking the magic and life and color out of the galaxy"; how does he feel about the destruction of the Jedi Order, his life-long enemy, which Witwer compared to the Joker from DC Comics living on after the death of Batman; and how does Maul's approach to training an apprentice differ from how Palpatine and other Sith have trained apprentices in the past? Witwer described the series as "bad guys versus worse guys", and said they would not try to redeem Maul. Rau said even Witwer was surprised by some of the new aspects they were discovering about the character. Witwer used his Star Wars knowledge to bring depth and authenticity to Maul, and to help introduce the other cast members to the franchise.

Michnovetz explained that the series is set on the planet Janix, which features a city inside a crater. He compared it to both Gotham City and Metropolis from DC Comics, with a functioning democracy and law enforcement that has formed a "peaceful accord" with local criminals and gangsters. It features "different levels and layers" like previous Star Wars cities. Maul decides to rebuild his criminal syndicate on Janix because it is untouched by the Empire, although the Empire is gaining power throughout the galaxy and appears in the series through the Jedi-hunting Inquisitors. Michnovetz described them as "secret mercenaries that show up out of the darkness".

=== Casting ===
Sam Witwer was confirmed to be reprising his role as Maul with the series' announcement. He suggested that sound designer David W. Collins could have a role in the series, similar to how Collins voiced the droid PROXY in the video game Star Wars: The Force Unleashed (2008) which starred Witwer as Galen Marek / Starkiller. Further cast members were announced in January 2026: Gideon Adlon as Devon Izara; Wagner Moura as Brander Lawson; Richard Ayoade, who previously voiced the droid Q9-0 or "Zero" in the live-action Star Wars series The Mandalorian (2019–2023), as "Two-Boots"; Collins as Spybot; Vanessa Marshall reprising her role as Rook Kast from The Clone Wars; Dennis Haysbert as Master Eeko-Dio Daki; Chris Diamantopoulos as Looti Vario; Charlie Bushnell as Rylee Lawson; Steve Blum as Icarus; and A. J. LoCascio as the Inquisitor Marrok. Marrok was introduced in the first season of the live-action series Ahsoka (2023), where he was portrayed by Paul Darnell. Marshall and Blum both starred in Rebels, respectively as Hera Syndulla and Zeb Orrelios, and Michnovetz said Maul – Shadow Lord features "a greatest hits package" of voice actors returning from previous Star Wars projects. Clancy Brown and Ewan McGregor are credited as their respective Star Wars characters Savage Opress and Obi-Wan Kenobi for flashbacks, though it is unclear if they recorded new dialogue or if archival recordings were used. For those flashbacks, Witwer voiced Darth Sidious, as he did in some previous projects starting with The Force Unleashed, and also young Savage. Scott Whyte voices Dryden Vos, replacing Paul Bettany who portrayed the character in Solo.

=== Animation and design ===
As with the previous Star Wars animated series, the animation was provided by CGCG, Inc. and Lucasfilm Animation's internal team. Key creatives returned from previous Lucasfilm Animation projects, including animation supervisor Keith Kellogg, cinematography and effects lead Joel Aron, and sound designer David W. Collins. Portillo said the crew improved all aspects of their work compared to the previous series, including the quality of assets, body mechanics, facial animation, lighting, effects, and matte paintings, even when compared to their most recent work on The Bad Batch and Star Wars: Tales of the Underworld (2025). She attributed the improvements to Filoni challenging the crew to move out of their comfort zones and avoid becoming complacent. Filoni praised the team's work on the series, saying they were "actually creating cinema" with the new episodes.

The series features a similar animation style to The Clone Wars and the other previous series, but is more stylized to reflect its focus on Maul and the "gritty" setting of the planet Janix. Filoni described the style as "in that Clone Wars world, but a little bit more extreme". Witwer called it "more edgy and jagged and dangerous", and said Aron was giving the series "painterly malice and thick shadows and reds and purples and all kinds of incredible lighting". Aron took inspiration from classic filmmaking techniques to include physical elements in the series, including painting brush strokes on glass and photographing them so they could be inserted into the animation, and creating matte paintings on physical canvases rather than making them with digital tools. Kellogg worked with the animators at CGCG and Lucasfilm to improve the performances of the lead characters. Portillo stated that Witwer influenced the nuances in Maul's performance, and gave as an example a tea ceremony Maul conducts with Devon. This was based on a tea ceremony that Witwer took part in while in Japan.

=== Music ===
Composers Kevin, Sean, and Deana Kiner returned from previous Star Wars animated series. They finished composing the score for the final episode and were ready to record it in late January 2026. The score references the theme "Duel of the Fates", which John Williams composed for the climactic lightsaber fight featuring Maul in The Phantom Menace. The first track from the Kiners' score, "Shadow Lord", was released digitally by Walt Disney Records on April 9, 2026, ahead of a full soundtrack album release for the first season on May 4.

All music is composed by Kevin Kiner, Sean Kiner, and Deana Kiner.

Star Wars: Maul – Shadow Lord (Original Soundtrack)
No.	Title	Length
1.	"Shadow Lord"	1:45
2.	"Devon Izara Steals Fruit"	1:33
3.	"Vario Chase"	1:57
4.	"Protect Vario"	3:02
5.	"Daki Saves the Bridge"	1:24
6.	"Devon Uses the Force"	1:42
7.	"Lawson Leaves"	0:48
8.	"Maul Captures Cargo"	3:10
9.	"Devon Fights Maul"	2:20
10.	"Devon Finds Daki"	2:06
11.	"Make Sure You Get Him"	1:27
12.	"Imperial Arrival"	0:53
13.	"Survival Is Our Concern"	1:02
14.	"Maul May Have a Point"	1:14
15.	"The Inquisitor's Temple"	0:43
16.	"Maul Training Sequence"	1:29
17.	"Tea Time Is Over"	1:46
18.	"Call to Oblivion"	1:17
19.	"Crow Arrives"	2:11
20.	"Ambushed on the Bridge"	1:45
21.	"Maul Through the Rubble"	2:19
22.	"Being Inconspicuous"	1:27
23.	"Lawson Bonding Time"	0:49
24.	"Spybot Down"	2:20
25.	"Toxic Escape"	3:14
26.	"Figure in the Fog"	1:02
27.	"We Need to Move"	0:53
28.	"We Need a Distraction"	0:59
29.	"You're Not Small You're Super Tall"	2:01
30.	"Great Risks Yield Great Rewards"	0:56
31.	"Unleash Your Potential"	2:18
32.	"Bridge Battle"	1:48
33.	"That Ain't Our Ship"	1:46
34.	"The Saber Battle"	0:57
35.	"A Noble End"	3:08
36.	"Help on the Way"	1:45
37.	"We Will Have Our Revenge"	2:03
38.	"Alright, I'm Ready"	1:29
Total length:		1:05:00

== Marketing ==
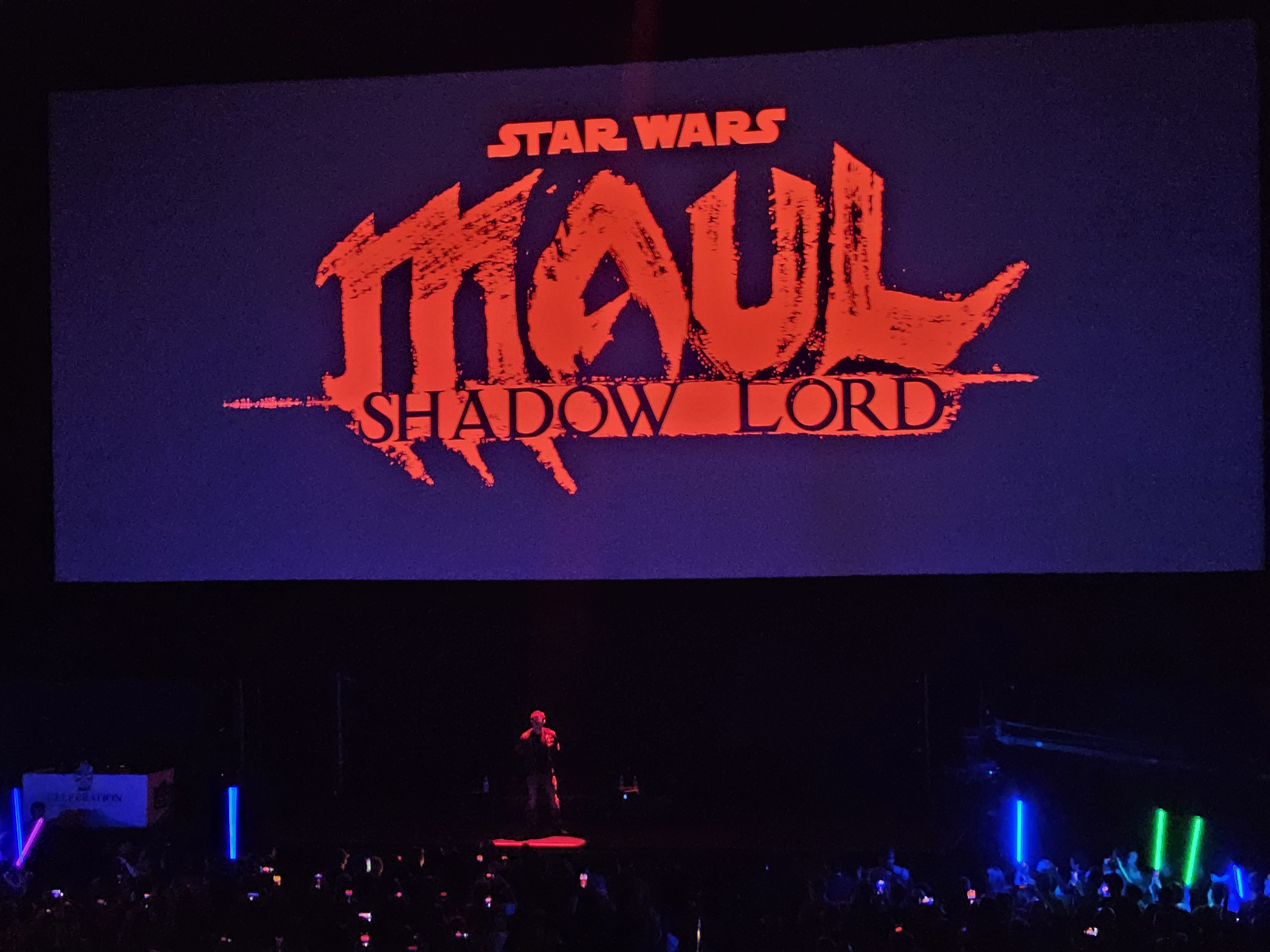
Sam Witwer on stage at Star Wars Celebration Japan in April 2025, where the series was announced

A trailer for the series was shown to attendees at Star Wars Celebration Japan's Lucasfilm Animation 20th anniversary panel in April 2025. Jordan King of Empire praised the animation as "gorgeously rendered", positively comparing it to the final season of The Clone Wars and The Bad Batch. Sarah El-Mahmoud at CinemaBlend felt the animation quality was "quite a few steps forward" from those series, and said the response to the trailer from attendees was "the most I've seen Star Wars fans lose their minds" during Celebration Japan. The appearance of Maul's apprentice led to speculation that she is the character Darth Talon from the Expanded Universe comic book series Star Wars: Legacy (2006–2010) by John Ostrander and Jan Duursema. Total Film's Anthony McGlynn felt it was unlikely that Lucasfilm would introduce a Twi'lek apprentice for Maul who was not Talon.

The first public teaser trailer was released online in January 2026, alongside a poster and key details about the series. King praised the animation, the design of Janix, and the dialogue heard in the teaser, saying "it's all deliciously brooding and distinctly Maulian stuff". Vanessa Armstrong at Reactor described the teaser as "dramatic, dark, and compellingly watchable", while Aimee Hart at Polygon said it was a triumphant return for Maul. Commentators again discussed the potential for Devon to actually be Darth Talon.

== Release ==
Star Wars: Maul – Shadow Lord premiered on the streaming service Disney+ on April 6, 2026. It consists of 10 episodes. Two episodes were released each week until Star Wars Day on May 4. The second season is set to premiere in 2027.

== Reception ==
=== Viewership ===
Star Wars: Maul – Shadow Lord debuted at No. 1 on the global Disney+ streaming charts. It remained among the platform's Top 10 titles throughout its first-season run. During its premiere week of streaming, the series amassed 4.1 million global views. Luminate, which measures streaming performance in the United States using viewership data, audience engagement metrics, and content reach across multiple platforms, reported that Star Wars: Maul – Shadow Lord generated 4.3 million views and was streamed for 1.1 billion minutes during the first half of 2026.

=== Critical response ===
The review aggregator website Rotten Tomatoes reported that 98% of 50 critics reviews were positive and the average rating for the first season was 7.80 out of 10. The website's critical consensus reads: "An inspired look into the depths of an iconic character, Maul once again proves that through kinetic, vibrant, and engaging animation the Star Wars saga can continue in masterful spades." Metacritic, which uses a weighted average, assigned the season a score of 75 out of 100, based on 10 critics, indicating "generally favorable" reviews.

=== Accolades ===
Accolades received by Star Wars: Maul – Shadow Lord
Award	Date of ceremony	Category	Recipient(s)	Result	Ref.
Astra TV Awards	August 15, 2026	Best Lead Voice-Over Performance	Sam Witwer	Nominated	
Primetime Creative Arts Emmy Awards	September 5–6, 2026	Outstanding Sound Editing for a Comedy or Drama Series (Half-Hour) and Animation	David W. Collins, Kevin Bolen, Bill Rudolph, Michael Brinkman, Frank Rinella, and Kimberly Patrick (for "Chapter 10: The Dark Lord")	Nominated	
TCA Awards	August 20, 2026	Outstanding Achievement in Animation	Star Wars: Maul – Shadow Lord	Nominated	

== Tie-in media ==
A five-issue prequel comic book series titled Star Wars: Shadow of Maul was published by Marvel Comics from March to July 2026. Written by Benjamin Percy with art by Madibek Musabekov, both returning from previous Marvel Star Wars comics, the comic introduces the planet Janix and the characters Brander Lawson and Two-Boots ahead of their key roles in Maul – Shadow Lord. Percy and Musabekov were able to read scripts and see episodes of the series while working on the comic. Percy said it was both a science fiction story and a crime story, with a noir tone that matched Musabekov's art style.
