= Text replacement =

Text replacement may refer to:

- Cut, copy, and paste
- Find and replace (disambiguation)
- Autoreplace (disambiguation)
