= Replaceable =

Replaceable or Replaceability may refer to:

- Replaceability (technology), the concept of interchangeable parts
- Replaceable parameter (DOS), in batch files
- "Replaceable" (CKY song)
- "Replaceable" (Killers song)

== See also ==
- Replaceability argument, a philosophical argument against vegetarianism
- Replacement (disambiguation)
- Interchangeability (disambiguation)
