= Kevin Kiner =

American film and television composer (born 1958)

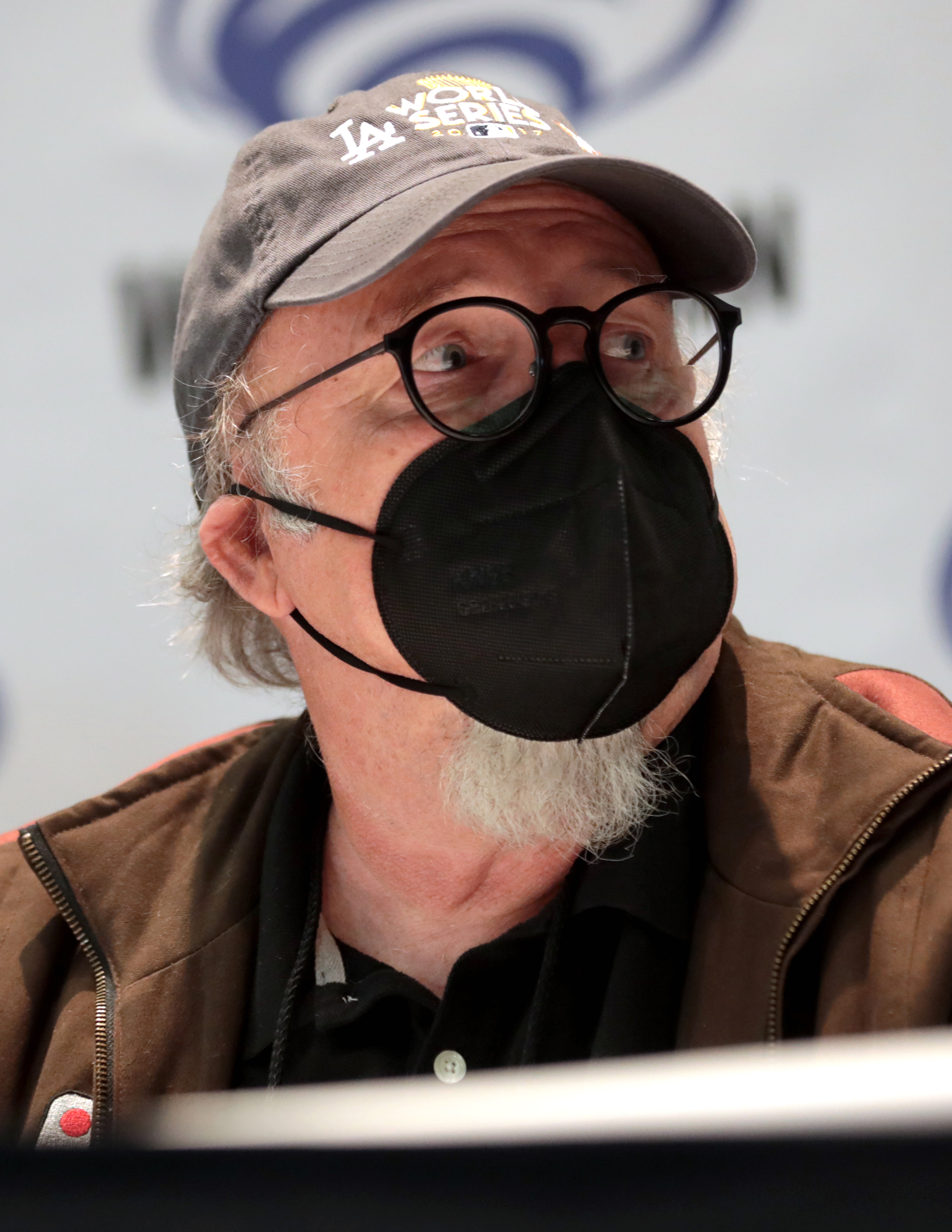
- Kiner at the 2022 WonderCon

Background information
- Born: September 3, 1958 (age 67); Escondido, California, U.S.
- Genres: Film score, video game music
- Occupations: Composer, conductor
- Instrument: Guitar
- Years active: 1986–present
- Website: kevinkiner.com

Kevin Kiner (born September 3, 1958) is an American film and television composer best known for scoring Star Wars: The Clone Wars, Star Wars Rebels, Star Wars: The Bad Batch, Star Wars: Tales, and Star Wars: Ahsoka. Kiner was nominated for multiple Primetime Emmy, Daytime Emmy and Annie Awards for Clone Wars and Rebels, while winning several BMI Awards for his work on CSI: Miami, Narcos: Mexico, Making a Murderer, and Walker, Texas Ranger.

== Career ==
Kiner was raised in Escondido, California, where his interest in music flourished through listening to different bands such as Yes, Pink Floyd, and the Eagles. After high school, Kiner attended the University of California, Los Angeles as a pre-medical student but later decided to pursue his passion for music instead. He then began traveling the world as a musical director for an international touring group before settling in Hollywood, where he began composing for film and television.

== Filmography ==
=== Film ===
Year	Title	Director(s)	Notes
1993	Leprechaun	Mark Jones	—N/a
1993	Freaked	Alex Winter; Tom Stern	Nominated – Fangoria Chainsaw Awards for Best Score
1995	Black Scorpion	Jonathan Winfrey	—N/a
1997	The Pest	Paul Miller	—N/a
1998	Safe House	Eric Steven Stahl	—N/a
1999	Wing Commander	Chris Roberts	—N/a
2001	The Other Side of Heaven	Mitch Davis	—N/a
2001	Tremors 3: Back to Perfection	Brent Maddock	Direct-to-video
2003	The Legend of Johnny Lingo	Steven Ramirez	Direct-to-video
2005	Madison	William Bindley	—N/a
2008	Star Wars: The Clone Wars	Dave Filoni	Star Wars themes by John Williams
2017	Inconceivable	Jonathan Baker	—N/a
2017	Ghost in the Shell	Rupert Sanders	Score composed by Clint Mansell and Lorne Balfe. Additional music composer.
2022	Samaritan	Julius Avery	Composed with Jed Kurzel. Additional music by Sean Kiner & Deana Kiner.
2023	Guardians of the Galaxy Vol. 3	James Gunn	Score composed by John Murphy. Original Guardians of the Galaxy theme by Tyler Bates. Additional music composer.
2024	Madame Web	S.J. Clarkson	Score composed by Johan Söderqvist. Additional music composer.

=== Television ===
Year	Title	Showrunner(s)	Notes
1988–92	Superboy	IIya Salkind and Alexander Salkind	—N/a
1990–92	Super Force	James J. McNamara	—N/a
1991–92	Land of the Lost	The Chiodo Brothers; Sid and Marty Krofft	—N/a
1996–97	The Real Adventures of Jonny Quest	Peter Lawrence and Takashi Masunaga	Nominated – Daytime Emmy Award for Outstanding Music Direction and Composition
1997–01	Walker, Texas Ranger	Leslie Greif and Paul Haggis	Won – BMI TV Music Award
1997–03	Stargate SG-1	Brad Wright and Jonathan Glassner	Co-composed with Joel Goldsmith, Richard Band, Dennis McCarthy, and Neal Acree.
2000–02	The Invisible Man	Matt Greenberg	—N/a
2001	Harold and the Purple Crayon	Carin Greenberg and Jeff Kline	Nominated – Annie Award For Outstanding Music in an Animated Television Production
2003	Stuart Little	Rich Wilkie	Nominated – Daytime Emmy Award for Outstanding Music Direction and Composition
2004–05	Star Trek: Enterprise	Brannon Braga and Manny Coto	—N/a
2003–12	CSI: Miami	Anthony E. Zuiker, Ann Donahue and Carol Mendelsohn	Co-composed with Jeff Cardoni; Won – BMI TV Music Award
2008	Dance War: Bruno vs. Carrie Ann	BBC Worldwide	—N/a
2008–14, 2020	Star Wars: The Clone Wars	George Lucas (Seasons 1-6); Dave Filoni (Season 7)	Star Wars themes by John Williams; Nominated – Daytime Emmy Award for Outstanding Music Direction and Composition; Nominated – Annie Award for Music in a Television Production; Won – Annie Award for Best Music in an Animated Television Production or Short Form; Additional music by David Glen Russell, Matthew St. Laurent, Takeshi Furukawa, Nolan Markey, Reuven Herman, Sean Kiner and Deana Kiner (Season 7)
2011–16	Hell on Wheels	Joe Gayton, Tony Gayton and John Wirth	—N/a
2014–18	Star Wars Rebels	Dave Filoni	Star Wars themes by John Williams; Nominated – Primetime Emmy Award for Outstanding Music Composition for a Series; Nominated – Annie Award For Outstanding Achievement in Music in an Animated TV/Broadcast Production; Additional music by David Glen Russell, Matthew St. Laurent, Sean Kiner (Seasons 3 & 4), and Deana Kiner (Seasons 3 & 4)
2014–19	Jane the Virgin	Jennie Snyder Urman	—N/a
2015–17	Transformers: Robots in Disguise	Adam Beechen, Duane Capizzi and Jeff Kline	Composed with Kevin Manthei
2015–18	Making a Murderer	Laura Ricciardi and Moira Demos	Won – BMI TV Music Award
2018–19	Single Parents	Elizabeth Meriwether and J. J. Philbin	Co-composed with Sean Kiner and Deana Kiner
2018–23	Titans	Greg Walker	Composed with Clint Mansell
2018–21	Narcos: Mexico	Chris Brancato and Carlo Bernard and Doug Miro	Composed with Gustavo Santaolalla; Won – BMI Visual Media Award
2019–22	City on a Hill	Charlie MacLean	—N/a
2019–23	Doom Patrol	Jeremy Carver	Composed with Clint Mansell
2021–24	Star Wars: The Bad Batch	Jennifer Corbett	Star Wars themes by John Williams; Composed with Sean Kiner and Deana Kiner; additional music by David Glen Russell, Nolan Markey, and Peter Lam
2021	Trese	Budjette Tan and Kajo Baldisimo	Composed with Sean Kiner and Deana Kiner
2022–present	Dark Winds	Graham Roland	Composed with Sean Kiner and Deana Kiner
2022–25	Peacemaker	James Gunn	Composed with Clint Mansell
2022–present	Star Wars: Tales	Dave Filoni	Star Wars themes by John Williams; Composed with Sean Kiner and Deana Kiner; additional music by David Glen Russell and Nolan Markey
2023–present	Ahsoka	Dave Filoni	Star Wars themes by John Williams; Additional music by Sean Kiner, Deana Kiner and David Glen Russell
2024–present	Creature Commandos	Dean Lorey	Composed with Clint Mansell
2026	Star Wars: Maul – Shadow Lord	Dave Filoni and Matt Mitchnovetz	Composed with Sean Kiner and Deana Kiner

=== Video games ===
Year	Title	Notes
2010	GoldenEye 007	Composed with David Arnold
2012	007 Legends	Composed with David Arnold

== Personal life ==
Kiner has two children, Sean and Deana, who are also music composers.

== See also ==
- Music of Star Wars
- Music of Star Trek
