= Lucasfilm Animation =

American animation company

Lucasfilm Animation Ltd. LLC
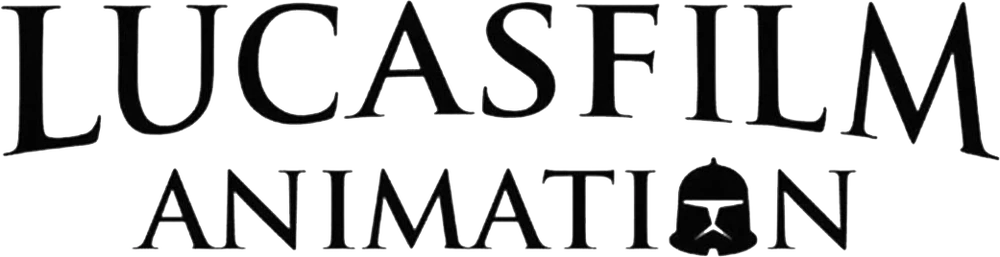
- Logo used since 2019
- Type: Subsidiary
- Industry: Animation, computer-generated imagery
- Founded: March 3, 2005; 21 years ago
- Founder: George Lucas
- Headquarters: Letterman Digital Arts Center; San Francisco, California, United States
- Area served: Worldwide
- Key people: Athena Portillo (vice president, animation production); Josh Rimes (vice president, animation development and production); Dave Filoni (Lucasfilm president & CCO); Lynwen Brennan (Lucasfilm co-president)
- Parent: Lucasfilm
- Subsidiaries: Lucasfilm Animation Singapore (2005–2023)

Lucasfilm Animation Ltd. LLC is an American animation studio and subsidiary of Lucasfilm, originally established in 2005. Its first major productions were the feature film Star Wars: The Clone Wars and its associated television series, both of which debuted in 2008 and Strange Magic, which premiered in 2015. In September 2016, Dave Filoni, known for his contributions to Star Wars: The Clone Wars and Star Wars Rebels, accepted a promotion to oversee the development of all future Lucasfilm Animation projects.

== Filmography ==
=== Feature films ===
Title	Director	Release date	Budget	Gross
Star Wars: The Clone Wars	Dave Filoni	August 15, 2008	$8.5 million	$68.3 million
Strange Magic	Gary Rydstrom	January 23, 2015	$70 – 100 million	$13.6 million

=== Television series ===
==== Released shows ====
Title	Creator(s) / Developer(s)	Year(s)	Network	Co-production with
Star Wars: The Clone Wars	George Lucas	2008–13	Cartoon Network	Lucasfilm
Star Wars: The Clone Wars	George Lucas	2014	Netflix	Lucasfilm
Star Wars: The Clone Wars	George Lucas	2020	Disney+	Lucasfilm
Star Wars Rebels	Dave Filoni; Simon Kinberg; Carrie Beck	2014–18	Disney XD	Lucasfilm
Star Wars Resistance	Dave Filoni; Kiri Hart; Carrie Beck	2018–20	Disney Channel; Disney XD	Lucasfilm; Polygon Pictures
Star Wars: The Bad Batch	Dave Filoni; Jennifer Corbett	2021–24	Disney+	Lucasfilm
Star Wars Tales: Tales of the Jedi; Tales of the Empire; Tales of the Underworld	Dave Filoni	2022–25	Disney+	Lucasfilm
Star Wars: Young Jedi Adventures	Michael Olson; Shellie Kvilvang; Josh Rimes; James Waugh; Lamont Magee	2023–25	Disney Jr. Disney+	Lucasfilm; Wild Canary Animation
Star Wars: Maul – Shadow Lord	Dave Filoni; Matt Michnovetz	2026–present	Disney+	Lucasfilm

==== Unaired shows ====
Title	Creator(s) / Developer(s)	Year(s)	Co-production with
Star Wars Detours	George Lucas; Brendan Hay	Unaired	Lucasfilm

=== Shorts and specials ===
Title	Creator(s) / Developer(s)	Year(s)	Network	Co-production with
Star Wars Rebels shorts	Dave Filoni; Simon Kinberg; Carrie Beck	2014	YouTube	Lucasfilm
Star Wars Blips shorts	—N/a	2017	YouTube	Lucasfilm
Star Wars Forces of Destiny shorts	Dave Filoni; Carrie Beck; Jennifer Muro	2017–18	YouTube	Lucasfilm; Ghostbot
Star Wars Forces of Destiny specials	Dave Filoni; Carrie Beck; Jennifer Muro	2017–18	Disney XD	Lucasfilm; Ghostbot
Star Wars Resistance shorts	Dave Filoni; Kiri Hart; Carrie Beck	2018	YouTube	Lucasfilm

== Lucasfilm Animation Singapore ==
Lucasfilm Animation Singapore logo (2005-2019)

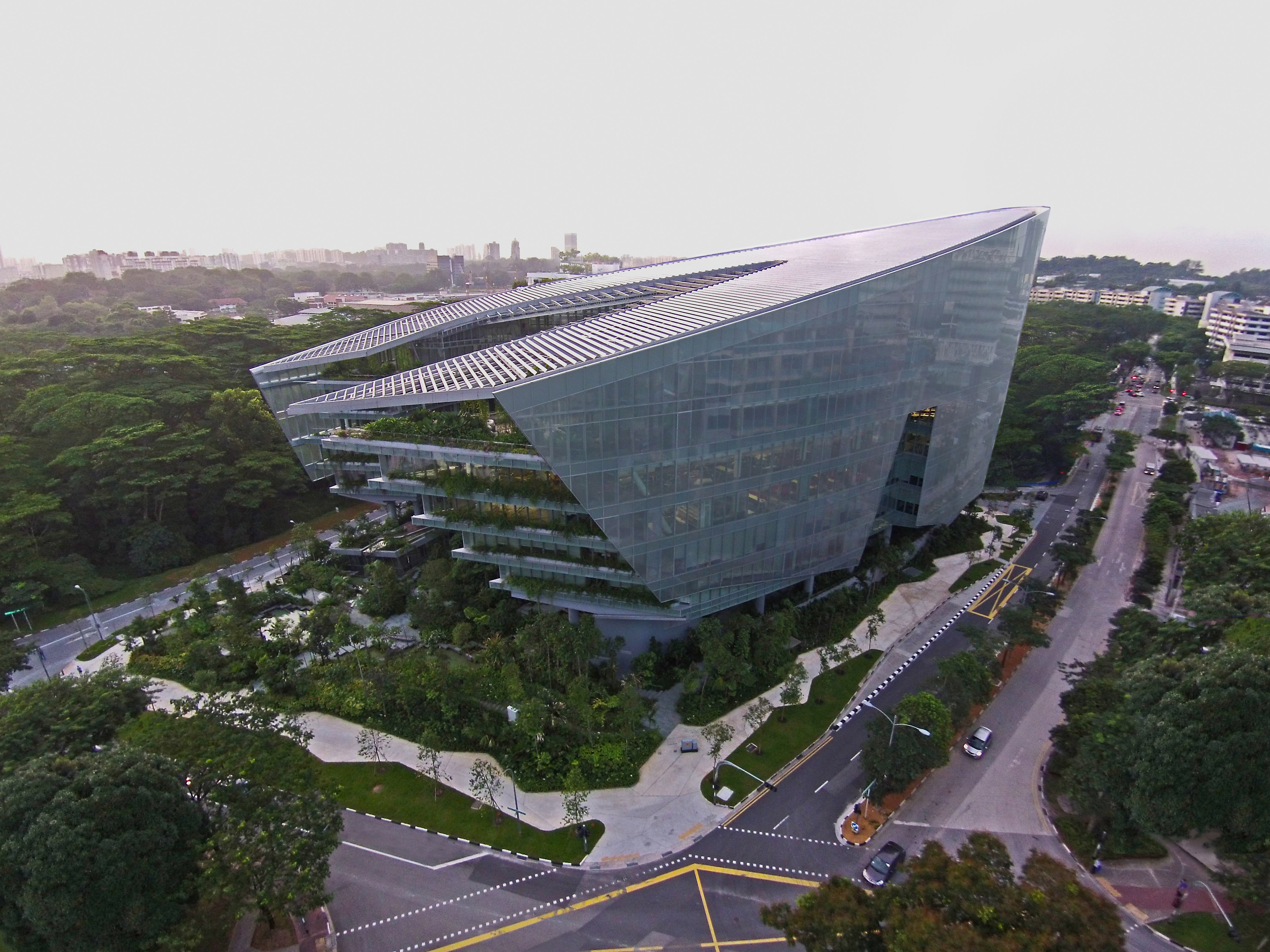
Sandcrawler building, former headquarters of Lucasfilm Animation and Industrial Light & Magic in Singapore

Founded in 2005 in Singapore as a means to tap into the talent pool, Lucasfilm Animation Singapore (LAS) opened in October 2005. LAS works closely with Lucasfilm Animation. The LAS production schedule also includes contributions to projects from other Lucasfilm companies. While the largest of LAS’ production groups focused on Star Wars: The Clone Wars, in July 2006 LAS announced the creation of the Game Group and the Digital Artists Group (DAG). With difficulty in meeting the technical and aesthetic requirements of Clone Wars, LAS was ultimately removed from the production and released a number of employees.

R2-D2 is featured in the company logo at the end of Star Wars: The Clone Wars.

Industrial Light & Magic launched its Singapore operations in 2006, as the first international ILM. The Digital Artists Group served as an extension of ILM, contributed to ILM's work on feature film visual effects. LAS had supported LucasArts’ video game productions and Lucasfilm Animation.

In November 2007, Lucasfilm Animation Singapore launched the Jedi Masters Program, a paid apprenticeship provided young artists with mentorship opportunities from industry professionals at ILM, LucasArts and Lucasfilm Animation. The Jedi Masters Program had classroom facilities within the Singapore studio and combined classroom instruction with mentored work in an actual production environment.

The Game Group developed Star Wars: The Clone Wars – Jedi Alliance in 2008 and Star Wars: The Clone Wars – Republic Heroes in 2009, both on the Nintendo DS.

Due to its old building being saturated, Lucasfilm Singapore moved into a new Eclipse building, frequently referred to as the Sandcrawler building, at the beginning of 2014. Sandcrawler, an eight-story building owned by Lucas Real Estate Singapore was home to Lucasfilm Singapore, Walt Disney Company (Southeast Asia) and ESPN Asia Pacific designed by Aedas.

In 2021, Disney has sold its Sandcrawler building for US$132 million to Blackstone Group.

On August 15, 2023, Lucasfilm announced that it would be shutting down its Singapore operations. Disney explained that the shutdown was due to economic factors, with the SAG-AFTRA strike in the United States affecting the industry's work.
