= Replacement level =

Replacement level may refer to:

- A replacement-level player, in baseball
- Replacement-level fertility, in human reproduction

== See also ==
- Value over replacement player, a baseball metric
