= Autoreplace =

Autoreplace may refer to:

- Autocomplete, word prediction software
- Autocorrect, automatic correction of spelling
- Shorthand, methods of abbreviating writing to increase speed
