= Kiner Music =

American composing duo

- Origin: Los Angeles, California
- Genres: film score
- Years active: 2015–present
- Members: Sean Kiner; Deana Kiner
- Website: www.thekinerbrothersmusic.com

Kiner Music (formerly known as Kiner Brothers) is a composing sibling duo consisting of Deana and Sean Kiner. Their father is Kevin Kiner, a composer mainly known for his work in the Star Wars franchise. The pair often collaborates with him.

== Early life ==
Deana and Sean grew up with music, as their father was in the music industry for around four decades and worked in the Star Wars franchise. They watched and listened to their father's work on his Star Wars creations. The family went to midnight showings to see it when it came out in movie theaters. Because of their father's career as an established composer, they had access to music technology early on.

As children, the siblings both played instruments and were members of their high school band. Sean played piano as a child and also took up the alto sax. Deana was a guitarist and bari sax player. Professionally, they began working with their father by taking on small roles. Sean attended Pepperdine University and intended on becoming a screenwriter. However, Kevin was diagnosed with cancer and Sean began to help him with work during treatment. Sean also said his father noticed his talent for recognizing music cues.

== Adult career ==
Deana attended Berklee College of Music, majoring in film score and then changing her major to songwriting. Kevin began giving Deana tasks related to his work when she was in college. One of these projects ended up being the score for the Netflix series Making a Murderer. By taking on these roles, the siblings began to realize they wanted this to be their career. Deana quit her job at Starbucks to join her father full-time.

They frequently collaborate with their father on different projects. The three of them share a studio, allowing them to work individually in their own spaces but to also collaborate and draw inspiration from one another. This was especially helpful as they continued to score projects during the COVID-19 pandemic. Kevin Kiner described the set-up as three separate recording studios connected to one house.

=== Star Wars ===
The duo's first work on the Star Wars universe was working on the score for Star Wars Rebels. The Kiners made musical contributions in Star Wars: The Clone Wars and The Bad Batch, and assisted with full compositions in Ahsoka.

The duo said Dave Filoni allowed them to develop their own voice within the Star Wars universe. Sean created the theme for Grand Admiral Thrawn. The duo needed to balance their own work with the iconic motifs and themes created by John Williams, such as the main Star Wars fanfare and the more gentle Leia's Theme. The duo, along with their father Kevin, build upon the influences that inspired John Williams and his work.

Deana and Sean were tasked with composing the score for The Bad Batch during the COVID-19 pandemic. Sean is credited with creating the theme for the main character Omega. During San Diego Comic-Con in 2024, Sean shared that he wrote Omega's Theme with his newborn daughter in his lap, saying, "The pandemic had just started. My daughter was a newborn, and I was literally writing with her in my lap, this little bundle of joy. And the world was so dark, and everything was so bad. Just to have her, to feel like pure potential, pure hope, knowing that I was going to do my best to try and make sure that this little bubble of happiness, that her life would be happy. That she would know that she was loved. I turned all that into [Omega's Theme]. I literally wrote it with her on my lap."

The duo also worked on Ahsoka. Before they began composing, the siblings and their father put together a playlist with music from people like Joe Hisaishi to get inspiration for the score. According to Kevin, who worked alongside the duo, Dave Filoni requested a score that had a samurai motif. Building off of that, the pair took influence from Japanese and Chinese culture. They used a guzheng as a main instrument for the character. Deana also learned to play the flute while scoring Ahsoka. The pair had access to a live orchestra as they scored the episodes. Deana also incorporated her friend Sarah Tudzin into the score as they felt they needed punk, rebellious energy in the music.

Apart from Star Wars properties, they have composed the scores for several popular TV shows, including Titans, Single Parents, Trese, Narcos: Mexico, Transformers, Dark Winds, Peacemaker and Doom Patrol.

== Awards ==
- 2023 BMI Film & TV Awards - Kevin, Sean, and Deana were awarded for their work scoring Dark Winds in the category BMI Cable Television Awards.
- 2024 BMI Film & TV Awards - Kevin, Sean, and Deana were nominated in the streaming category for their work in Ahsoka and the cable category for their work in Dark Winds.

== Personal life ==
Sean and Deana are half Filipino. Their mother, who is from the Philippines, never taught them Tagalog because she wanted them to fully assimilate into American culture. They have expressed the struggle they face with their mixed-race heritage, but feel excited about opportunities to work on Filipino stories, such as scoring the Netflix show Trese, a show about Filipino myths and creatures.

Deana is transgender, and came out the night of the BMI Awards, which was the same night the family earned multiple accolades for their work. Deana has said that both Lucasfilm and The Bad Batch fans were supportive after she came out.

Deana is married to her wife, Alex. Sean has at least one child, a daughter.
