= Find and replace =

Find and replace may refer to:

- a feature of text processing as found:
  - in text editors
  - in formal language theory
  - in particular programming languages
- Find and Replace (audio drama)

== See also ==
- Regular expressions
- String searching algorithms
- replace (command), an MS DOS command
