= Star Wars: The Bad Batch =

American animated television series (2021-2024)

- Genre: Action-adventure; Science fiction
- Created by: Dave Filoni
- Based on: Star Wars by George Lucas
- Developed by: Dave Filoni; Jennifer Corbett
- Directed by: Brad Rau
- Voices of: Dee Bradley Baker; Michelle Ang
- Composers: Kevin Kiner; Sean Kiner; Deana Kiner
- Country of origin: United States
- Original language: English
- No. of seasons: 3
- No. of episodes: 47

Production
- Executive producers: Dave Filoni; Athena Yvette Portillo; Jennifer Corbett; Brad Rau
- Producer: Josh Rimes
- Running time: 23–33 minutes (Note: Most episodes of the series are 23–33 minutes long, except for the series premiere which is 76 minutes and the series finale which is 51 minutes.)
- Production companies: Lucasfilm; Lucasfilm Animation

Original release
- Network: Disney+
- Release: May 4, 2021 – May 1, 2024

Related
- Star Wars: The Clone Wars

Star Wars: The Bad Batch is an American animated television series created by Dave Filoni for the streaming service Disney+. It is part of the Star Wars franchise and a spin-off from Star Wars: The Clone Wars, set in the aftermath of the Clone Wars and following the events of Order 66. The Bad Batch follows Clone Force 99, a unique squad of clone troopers with genetic mutations who resist Order 66 and go on the run in the early days of the Galactic Empire. They are joined by Omega, a young female clone.

Dee Bradley Baker voices the Bad Batch, as well as most of the other clones in the series, as he did in The Clone Wars. Michelle Ang voices Omega. The series was announced in July 2020, after the final season of The Clone Wars introduced the Bad Batch based on an idea from Star Wars creator George Lucas. The Bad Batch was produced by Lucasfilm Animation, with Jennifer Corbett as head writer and Brad Rau as supervising director; Filoni, Corbett, and Rau served as executive producers with Athena Yvette Portillo.

The first season premiered on May 4, 2021, and ran for 16 episodes until August 13. A 16-episode second season was released from January 4 to March 29, 2023, and a 15-episode third and final season was released from February 21 to May 1, 2024. The series has received positive reviews from critics, particularly for its animation and voice acting.

== Premise ==
In the Star Wars universe, the Clone Wars is a series of conflicts between the Galactic Republic and a Separatist movement; the name comes from the Republic's army, which consists of clone troopers created from the genetic material of bounty hunter Jango Fett. Clone Force 99, also known as "The Bad Batch", is a unique squad of clones with genetic mutations that were introduced in the series Star Wars: The Clone Wars. These mutations allow most of the Bad Batch to resist Order 66, which brings the Clone Wars to an end by triggering secret programming in the clones that forces them to execute the Jedi and become obedient to Emperor Palpatine and the new Galactic Empire. Star Wars: The Bad Batch follows the titular team as they become mercenaries on the run in the early days of the Empire. They are joined by Omega, a young female clone of Jango Fett.

The series also tells the stories of other clones following the end of the Clone Wars, including how some begin to question Order 66, how the Empire phases out the clone army in favor of conscripted Stormtroopers, and how Imperial cloning resources are re-directed to "Project Necromancer"—a secret project to clone Palpatine that helps explain his return from death in the film Star Wars: The Rise of Skywalker (2019).

== Episodes ==
Season	Episodes	Originally released	
Season	Episodes	First released	Last released
1	16	May 4, 2021	August 13, 2021
2	16	January 4, 2023	March 29, 2023
3	15	February 21, 2024	May 1, 2024

=== Season 1 (2021) ===
No. overall	No. in season	Title	Directed by	Written by	Original release date
1	1	"Aftermath"	Steward Lee, Saul Ruiz & Nathaniel Villanueva	Jennifer Corbett & Dave Filoni	May 4, 2021
Clone Force 99, also known as "The Bad Batch", includes defective clone troopers Hunter, Tech, Crosshair, and Wrecker plus cyborg clone Echo. During the Clone Wars, the Bad Batch assists Jedi Master Depa Billaba and her Padawan learner Caleb Dume on Kaller. Order 66 is issued, triggering programming in the regular clones that makes them kill Billaba. The Bad Batch receives the order too, but only Crosshair feels compelled to obey it, and Hunter lets Dume escape. Returning to the clone facilities on Kamino, the Bad Batch learns that the war is over and an Empire has replaced the Galactic Republic. They meet a young girl, Omega, who is another defective clone. Admiral Tarkin arrives to evaluate the clones and sends the Bad Batch to eliminate insurgents on Onderon. When they discover that these "insurgents" are refugees under Saw Gerrera who refuse to submit to the new Empire, the Bad Batch abandons the mission and returns for Omega. They are arrested for treason, and Tarkin enhances Crosshair's programming, turning him against his squad. The rest of the Bad Batch flee with Omega.
2	2	"Cut and Run"	Steward Lee	Gursimran Sandhu	May 7, 2021
The Bad Batch and Omega seek refuge on Saleucami with clone deserter Cut Lawquane, who tells them about the inhibitor chips that programmed the regular clones and Crosshair to be loyal to the Empire after Order 66. With increased military presence from the Empire, Cut plans to escape with his family, but they need newly introduced chain codes to book public transport. Cut would be arrested if he tried to obtain chain codes, so Tech and Echo steal some, and Omega helps deliver them to Cut and his family in time for them to board the transport. Hunter wants Omega to go with Cut so she can have a family, but she decides to stay with the Bad Batch.
3	3	"Replacements"	Nathaniel Villanueva	Matt Michnovetz	May 14, 2021
The Bad Batch's ship, the Marauder, is damaged on Saleucami. They are stranded on a moon and an Ordo Moon Dragon steals the part they need to repair the ship. Hunter and Omega set out to retrieve it. When Hunter is incapacitated, Omega continues alone and retrieves the part without a fight. On Kamino, Tarkin and Vice Admiral Rampart put Crosshair in command of a new unit of conscripted soldiers. They are sent to Onderon to wipe out Gerrera's camp, but Gerrera is already gone. Crosshair kills a disloyal recruit, but the rest comply and are otherwise successful. Tarkin sees potential for conscripted soldiers, concerning Kaminoan prime minister Lama Su.
4	4	"Cornered"	Saul Ruiz	Christian Taylor	May 21, 2021
On their way to a proposed hiding-place on Idaflor, the Bad Batch is forced to stop on the nearest planet, Pantora, so they can gather supplies and Tech can modify their ship's signature since it now appears on the Empire's wanted list. A landing bay attendant on Pantora identifies the Bad Batch and informs Fennec Shand, a mercenary who has been hired to retrieve Omega. Hunter, Echo, and Omega search for supplies while Tech and Wrecker work on the ship. Omega is approached by Shand, which leads to Hunter chasing Shand through the city. Hunter and Omega lose Shand, and after the modifications are completed the Bad Batch departs from Pantora.
5	5	"Rampage"	Steward Lee	Tamara Becher-Wilkinson	May 28, 2021
Hoping to discover who hired Shand, the Bad Batch goes to Ord Mantell where Echo knows of an informant named Cid. She offers to find out about Shand in exchange for their help: slavers have kidnapped a child named Muchi, and Cid will receive a reward from Jabba the Hutt if the Bad Batch helps her rescue the child. The Bad Batch finds and fights off the slavers, rescuing Muchi, who is a young rancor. Taking her to Cid, Muchi is then given to Jabba's right-hand man Bib Fortuna in exchange for the reward. Cid gives some of the reward to Hunter but is unable to learn who hired Shand. She offers to give the Bad Batch more mercenary work in the future.
6	6	"Decommissioned"	Nathaniel Villanueva	Amanda Rose Muñoz	June 4, 2021
Cid hires the Bad Batch to retrieve a Separatist tactical droid with battle intel before it is destroyed at a Corellian decommissioning site. They run into smuggler sisters Trace and Rafa Martez, who are also after the droid. Wrecker's inhibitor chip begins to activate after he accidentally hits his head. Tech copies the tactical droid's data before it is destroyed when he and the sisters program it to turn on the police droids that are guarding the facility, allowing them to escape. The sisters explain that they were retrieving the droid for a client who is fighting the Empire, and Hunter decides to give them the data. Later, the sisters tell their client how to find the Bad Batch.
7	7	"Battle Scars"	Saul Ruiz	Jennifer Corbett	June 11, 2021
After they fail to retrieve the tactical droid's data, Cid tells the Bad Batch that they will need to do a big job to pay off their debt to her. They are interrupted by the Martez sisters' client, former clone captain Rex, who is alarmed to learn that the Bad Batch have yet to remove their inhibitor chips as he has. They go to Bracca, a starship graveyard planet controlled by the Scrapper Guild, and sneak onto an old Jedi cruiser to use its medical bay. Wrecker's chip forces him to attack his squad mates, but he is subdued and the chip is removed. Rex takes his leave once the extractions are completed; as they say goodbye, Hunter is seen by members of the Scrapper Guild.
8	8	"Reunion"	Steward Lee	Christian Taylor	June 18, 2021
The Scrapper Guild informs the Empire of the Bad Batch's location, and Crosshair is sent to kill them. Concerned that Omega will not be returned safely, Lama Su hires a second bounty hunter to retrieve the girl. The Bad Batch attempts to reach the Marauder through the Jedi cruiser's ion engine. Crosshair pins them inside and has the engine turned on, but they use explosives salvaged from the cruiser's armory to escape and Crosshair is injured by the engine's ignition. Hunter and Omega are confronted by bounty hunter Cad Bane, who shoots Hunter and kidnaps Omega. The rest of the squad catch up, carry the injured Hunter to the Marauder, and escape.
9	9	"Bounty Lost"	Brad Rau & Nathaniel Villanueva	Matt Michnovetz	June 25, 2021
While chasing after Bane, the Bad Batch learns from Tech that Omega is an unmodified clone of Jango Fett and so is the only available source of fresh cloning material for the Kaminoans. En route to an old Kaminoan cloning facility on Bora Vio for her delivery, Omega tricks Bane's droid aide Todo into releasing her and is able to signal the Bad Batch. Lama Su sends Taun We to retrieve Omega and orders Nala Se to eliminate the girl after extracting genetic samples from her. Nala Se cares for Omega and wants to keep her safe, so she sends Shand to rescue her. Shand kills Taun We and duels Bane, allowing Omega to escape and be retrieved by the Bad Batch.
10	10	"Common Ground"	Saul Ruiz	Gursimran Sandhu	July 2, 2021
On Raxus, which was the seat of the Separatist government during the Clone Wars, the Empire institutes new curfew laws with the support of local senator Avi Singh. However, Singh speaks out against the Empire while addressing the public and is arrested. His protocol droid GS-8 hires Cid to help rescue Singh, and she sends the Bad Batch; they are reluctant to help after fighting against the Separatists in the Clone Wars. Omega is left behind due to the bounty hunters that are targeting her, and she wins Cid enough money playing dejarik to pay off the Bad Batch's debt. With the help of GS-8, the Bad Batch rescues Singh and take him to Cid for payment.
11	11	"Devil's Deal"	Steward Lee	Tamara Becher-Wilkinson	July 9, 2021
When Senator Orn Free Taa announces a new Imperial refinery on Ryloth and encourages Twi'lek freedom fighters to disarm, resistance leader Cham Syndulla publicly supports the Empire. His lieutenant Gobi Glie takes Cham's daughter Hera on a secret mission to retrieve weapons from the Bad Batch, during which Hera befriends Omega. Crosshair tracks them, and the Empire arrests Glie and Hera for treason. Cham attacks the Imperial convoy to rescue them with his wife Eleni and other freedom fighters. Crosshair shoots Orn Free Taa, allowing Rampart to frame Cham for Taa's attempted assassination. Cham, Eleni, and Glie are arrested but Hera escapes.
12	12	"Rescue on Ryloth"	Nathaniel Villanueva	Jennifer Corbett	July 16, 2021
Hera contacts Omega and asks the Bad Batch to help rescue her parents. Hunter does not think this is worth the risk, but Omega convinces him. Hera, Omega, Tech, and Wrecker attack the new Imperial refinery on Ryloth as a distraction while Echo and Hunter free Cham, Eleni, and the other freedom fighters. Crosshair discovers this and sets a trap for them, but clone Captain Howzer—who is loyal to Cham—warns the escapees of the trap and then confronts his fellow soldiers. Howzer is arrested while the Bad Batch and freedom fighters escape. Rampart realizes that he has underestimated the Bad Batch and gives Crosshair permission to hunt them down.
13	13	"Infested"	Saul Ruiz	Amanda Rose Muñoz	July 23, 2021
The Bad Batch returns from a mission to find Cid's parlor under the ownership of crime boss Roland Durand. They find Cid outside, and she reveals a plan to take back the parlor by stealing a shipment of spice from Roland that is intended for the Pyke Syndicate. The Bad Batch and Cid enter her office via underground tunnels infested with a hive of Irlings. They retrieve the spice, but are chased by Roland's guards who awaken the hive. The group escape from the tunnels but lose the spice to the hive. They are caught by the Pykes, who take Omega hostage while the Bad Batch and Cid retrieve the spice from the hive. The Pykes then let Cid reclaim her parlor.
14	14	"War-Mantle"	Steward Lee	Damani Johnson	July 30, 2021
Rex contacts the Bad Batch and asks them to respond to a distress signal from clone commando Gregor on the planet Daro. At the source of the signal, they find an Imperial base where conscripted soldiers are being trained by clone commandos to replace the clone trooper army. Hunter, Tech, and Echo infiltrate the base while Omega and Wrecker stay in the ship as backup. The Bad Batch rescues Gregor, but Hunter is captured during the escape. On Kamino, Lama Su and Nala Se plan to escape after the Empire cancels their clone army contracts, but they are caught by Rampart. He says the Empire has a use for Nala Se as a scientist, but not for Lama Su.
15	15	"Return to Kamino"	Nathaniel Villanueva	Matt Michnovetz	August 6, 2021
Hunter is taken to Tipoca City on Kamino, where the Empire has evacuated critical personnel and eliminated the rest. Crosshair activates Hunter's communicator to lure the rest of the Bad Batch there. Omega shows the others a hidden entrance into Nala Se's secret laboratory, where they were all created and where they find the friendly droid AZI-3. They find Hunter, who tries to convince Crosshair to have his inhibitor chip removed, but Crosshair reveals that it has already been removed and he is willingly working for the Empire. Hunter stuns Crosshair as Rampart, under the orders of Tarkin, begins destroying Tipoca City with the Bad Batch and Crosshair still inside.
16	16	"Kamino Lost"	Saul Ruiz	Jennifer Corbett	August 13, 2021
Rampart and the Empire depart as the wreckage of Tipoca City sinks into the ocean. Omega and AZI-3 save Crosshair when they are trapped in a flooding room. Once the wreckage of the city settles on the ocean floor, the group make their way to an access tube that leads to the Marauder, but find it damaged. Crosshair suggests AZI-3 guide them to the surface inside lab capsules, but the droid runs out of power on their way up. Omega tries to save him at the risk of drowning, until Crosshair saves them both. When they reach the Marauder, Crosshair chooses to part ways with the Bad Batch. Nala Se is brought to a secret Imperial facility at Mount Tantiss.

=== Season 2 (2023) ===
No. overall	No. in season	Title	Directed by	Written by	Original release date
17	1	"Spoils of War"	Steward Lee	Jennifer Corbett	January 4, 2023
After a tip-off by her pirate friend Phee Genoa, Cid sends the Bad Batch to Serenno to steal part of Count Dooku's war chest. After some reluctance, Hunter agrees and the squad goes to the planet where they find the Empire already transporting the Count's wealth off world. While trying to steal some of the cargo, the Bad Batch is seen and a fight ensues during which Omega, Tech, and Echo are trapped inside a cargo ship preparing for lift-off. They fight their way to one of the cargo containers on the ship and escape inside it, attempting to use its own thrusters to make a safe landing. Meanwhile, Hunter and Wrecker are pursued through the ruins of a nearby city.
18	2	"Ruins of War"	Nathaniel Villanueva	Gina Lucita Monreal	January 4, 2023
The cargo container crashes on Serenno. While making their way back to the Marauder, Omega, Tech, and Echo meet local man Romar Adell who is hiding in the woods. Talking to him, they get a first impression of what a free life might be like. Omega sneaks away to try recover some of the cargo from the container; Echo and Tech go after her, resulting in a clash with Imperial search parties. Romar helps them escape. Hunter and Wrecker fight their way out of the city and reunite with the others. Learning that the Bad Batch survived the destruction of Tipoca City, Rampart fears punishment for his failure to eliminate them and decides not to inform Tarkin of this.
19	3	"The Solitary Clone"	Saul Ruiz	Amanda Rose Muñoz	January 11, 2023
Crosshair is assigned to clone commander Cody on a mission to the former Separatist planet Desix to rescue new Imperial governor Grotton, who has been taken hostage by a local resistance movement. Desix's former governor, Tawni Ames, demands that the planet remain out of Imperial jurisdiction and cites the Republic's refusal to broker peace with the Separatists during the Clone Wars. Cody argues for a peaceful resolution, but Crosshair kills Ames on Grotton's orders. Desix is brought under Imperial control. Returning to the Imperial capital Coruscant, Cody questions whether the Empire is doing good while Crosshair remains loyal. Cody deserts soon after.
20	4	"Faster"	Steward Lee	Matt Michnovetz	January 18, 2023
While Hunter and Echo are away on an assignment, Cid takes Omega, Tech, and Wrecker to a race on Safa Toma. Cid is challenged by Millegi, one of her business rivals, and his racer Jet Venim. During the next round, Millegi orders Venim to cheat and this causes Cid's cocky droid racer TAY-0 to lose. When Millegi comes to collect, Omega challenges him to another race for Cid's freedom. Just before the next event, TAY-0 is wrecked in an accident. Tech takes TAY-0's place as Cid's pilot and uses his calculative intellect to offset his lack of experience, winning the race. Millegi honors his end of the deal, but warns the clones that Cid might turn against them one day.
21	5	"Entombed"	Nathaniel Villanueva	Christopher Yost	January 25, 2023
While searching a junkyard for useful salvage, Omega and Wrecker find an ancient compass with a set of coordinates for the uncharted Kaldar Trinary system. Believing this compass will lead them to hidden treasure, Phee and Omega persuade the Bad Batch to set out for the system. The compass leads them to the planet Skara Nal, the resting place of a legendary crystal known as the "Heart of the Mountain". They find the crystal and Phee takes it, activating a giant, ancient mech which begins destroying their surroundings. Fearing that the Marauder will be destroyed and leave them stranded, the others convince Phee to return the crystal. This destroys the mech.
22	6	"Tribe"	Steward Lee	Matt Michnovetz	February 1, 2023
The Bad Batch goes to the criminal cartel Vanguard Axis to sell chain codes that Tech has forged. While there, Omega helps Gungi, a captive Wookiee Jedi youngling, escape from the cartel. Taking Gungi back to his homeworld Kashyyyk, the Bad Batch finds the planet being ravaged by a group of Trandoshan mercenaries who work for the Empire. After winning the trust of a local Wookiee tribe, the Bad Batch learns about the respect that the Wookiees have for the giant wroshyr trees. They join the Wookiees and the indigenous wildlife to enact a plan that the Wookiees say came from the trees. Together they defeat the Imperial forces and Gungi is reunited with his people.
23	7	"The Clone Conspiracy"	Nathaniel Villanueva	Ezra Nachman	February 8, 2023
Rampart asks the Imperial Senate to authorize the replacement of the clone army with conscripted Stormtroopers. He has covered up the intentional destruction of Tipoca City, blaming it on a storm. Senator Riyo Chuchi advocates for the clones' rights and is approached by clone trooper Slip, whose friend was killed after questioning Rampart's storm story. Rampart sends an assassin to kill them. As Chuchi asks Slip to testify in front of the Senate, the assassin kills Slip and attacks Chuchi. She is rescued by Rex, who Slip had asked for help. Rex captures the assassin, who is a clone, but the assassin kills himself before he can be questioned.
24	8	"Truth and Consequences"	Steward Lee	Damani Johnson	February 8, 2023
Rex asks the Bad Batch for help and they travel to Coruscant. Omega accompanies Chuchi to ask for support from other senators while Rex and the Bad Batch sneak aboard Rampart's Star Destroyer, which is undergoing maintenance, to retrieve proof of the Tipoca City cover-up. In the Senate, Chuchi exposes Rampart's lie and he is arrested. However, Emperor Palpatine argues that Rampart's attack was carried out by clones and so this revelation supports the need for a new, conscripted army; the Senate approves the bill. Before the Bad Batch leaves Coruscant, Echo decides to stay with Rex to help him fight for a better future for the clones.
25	9	"The Crossing"	Nathaniel Villanueva	Brooke Roberts	February 15, 2023
Cid sends the Bad Batch to extract some ipsium mineral from a mine she recently purchased. While they are in the mine, the Marauder is stolen and they are stranded. Forced to trek towards a nearby spaceport, the Bad Batch is buried inside another mine when their ipsium is detonated by a lightning storm. Inside the new mine, Omega discovers an ipsium vein and tries to harvest it with Tech. They are separated from the others and have a talk about adapting to changes in life, such as Echo's departure, before they find another way out. They find the spaceport abandoned but manage to contact Cid, who grudgingly agrees to pick them up in a few days.
26	10	"Retrieval"	Steward Lee	Moisés Zamora	February 22, 2023
The Marauder is taken by its thief, a young boy named Benni Baro, to gang boss Mokko at a nearby ipsium mining facility. Mokko prepares to strip the ship for parts to sell. At the spaceport, Omega devises a way to track the Marauder and the Bad Batch finds the facility. Infiltrating it, they find Benni and force him to take them to the ship. Benni, hoping to gain Mokko's favor, betrays the Bad Batch's presence. Just before they are captured, Omega discovers that Mokko has been exploiting his workers for his own profit. With this revelation, Benni turns his comrades against Mokko, who falls to his death. The Bad Batch fixes the Marauder and leaves the planet.
27	11	"Metamorphosis"	Saul Ruiz	Sabir Pirzada	March 1, 2023
Dr. Royce Hemlock assumes control of the Imperial cloning facility at Mount Tantiss, where Nala Se refuses to help with the Emperor's cloning projects. A covert transport bound for the facility is stranded and Cid assigns the Bad Batch to recover its cargo. While exploring the wreck, they discover that the cargo is an immature Zillo Beast that was created by the Empire through cloning. An Imperial strike force is sent to recover the beast and capture any witnesses, forcing the Bad Batch to retreat. In return for his freedom, Lama Su is brought to the Tantiss facility to persuade Nala Se to cooperate with Hemlock. Lama Su tells Hemlock that Nala Se cares for Omega.
28	12	"The Outpost"	Nathaniel Villanueva & Brad Rau	Jennifer Corbett	March 8, 2023
Crosshair is assigned to Lieutenant Nolan, who dislikes clones. At a remote Imperial outpost on Barton IV, two crates of classified cargo are stolen. Nolan orders Crosshair and clone commander Mayday to recover the cargo. The pair eliminate the thieves and find the cargo, which is Stormtrooper armor. An avalanche injures Mayday and buries the cargo. At the outpost, Nolan chastises them for their failure and refuses to provide a medic for Mayday, who succumbs to his injuries. Fed up with Nolan's arrogance and disrespect of clones, Crosshair kills him. After losing consciousness, Crosshair wakes up as a prisoner in the Tantiss facility and meets Dr. Emerie Karr.
29	13	"Pabu"	Steward Lee	Amanda Rose Muñoz	March 15, 2023
After Cid did not come to rescue them from the mining planet, the Bad Batch and Omega informally cut ties with her. They help Phee recover a lost artifact, and she convinces them to accompany her to the peaceful island of Pabu which she thinks could be a safe place for them to live away from the Empire. They are hosted by Mayor Shep Hazard and his daughter Lyana, who befriends Omega. When a tsunami threatens the lower levels of the city, Hunter rescues Omega and Lyana from a boat while Tech and Wrecker help Shep and Phee evacuate the population of the lower levels. After the tsunami, the Bad Batch agrees to stay on Pabu and help rebuild.
30	14	"Tipping Point"	Saul Ruiz	Jennifer Corbett & Matt Michnovetz	March 22, 2023
Howzer and other clones imprisoned for disobedience against the Empire are rescued en route to Tantiss by Echo, Gregor, and other rogue clones. At Tantiss, Hemlock interrogates Crosshair about the whereabouts of Omega and the Bad Batch. Crosshair is left unattended for a moment and escapes long enough to send a message to the Bad Batch, warning them that the Empire is looking for Omega, before being subjected to intense torture. Echo joins the Bad Batch on Pabu with data he retrieved during the rescue. After receiving Crosshair's message and analyzing Echo's data, the Bad Batch learns about the Empire's secret Advanced Science Division (ASD).
31	15	"The Summit"	Nathaniel Villanueva	Matt Michnovetz	March 29, 2023
The Bad Batch trails Hemlock to a summit, hosted by Tarkin on Eriadu, which concerns top-secret Imperial programs including the ASD's cloning research and "Project Stardust". As they sneak into the base where the summit is held, the Bad Batch discovers that Saw Gerrera has also infiltrated the compound to assassinate the assembled top-level Imperial officers. They ask Gerrera not to complete his mission so they can follow Hemlock back to the ASD's secret facility, but Gerrera sets off explosives when the intruders are discovered. The Bad Batch attempts to escape using the base's railcar system, but this is disrupted by the explosions and they are stranded.
32	16	"Plan 99"	Steward Lee	Jennifer Corbett	March 29, 2023
With their railcar stuck and under attack from Imperial forces, Tech sacrifices his life to boost the others away from the Empire. They retreat to Cid's parlor on Ord Mantell to treat their injuries and come to terms with their loss. They soon realize that Cid has betrayed them to Hemlock, who arrives and captures Hunter and Wrecker. This forces Omega to come into the open. Echo and AZI-3 rescue Hunter and Wrecker, but Omega is captured and taken to Tantiss. Hemlock uses Omega's presence to encourage Nala Se to work on their projects. Omega encounters Crosshair and Emerie Karr; the latter reveals herself to also be a clone, making her Omega's genetic sister.

=== Season 3 (2024) ===
No. overall	No. in season	Title	Directed by	Written by	Original release date
33	1	"Confined"	Saul Ruiz	Jennifer Corbett	February 21, 2024
At the Tantiss facility, Omega is forced to work with Nala Se and Emerie on the cloning program. She takes daily blood samples from clones, including herself; Nala Se secretly discards the samples of Omega's blood before they can be used. Omega also feeds the facility's lurca hounds and befriends one of them, which she names Batcher. Omega evades the guards to speak with Crosshair, who attempts to discourage her from planning an escape. When the Imperials decide to euthanize Batcher for becoming too domesticated, Omega releases her into the jungle outside the facility. Hemlock warns Omega that further defiance will result in consequences for Crosshair.
34	2	"Paths Unknown"	Nate Villanueva	Matt Michnovetz	February 21, 2024
Hunter and Wrecker gain intel on Hemlock's base from the Durand crime family, but it leads them to an old abandoned facility. They run into former clone cadets Mox, Deke, and Stak who were left behind when the Empire destroyed and abandoned the facility. The area is now covered in slither vines, an Imperial experiment gone awry. Deke helps Hunter and Wrecker avoid the vines and enter the facility to access any data it has on Hemlock's operation. The trio are attacked by the slither vines, which are revealed to be the tentacles of a huge monster. Mox and Stak use the Marauder to rescue the others, and Hunter promises to take the cadets to Pabu.
35	3	"Shadows of Tantiss"	Steward Lee	Matt Michnovetz	February 21, 2024
Emperor Palpatine travels to Tantiss for an update on "Project Necromancer", which he believes is vital for the future of the Empire. It has so far failed to reproduce a subject's "M-count" in a clone. When Emerie begins testing a sample of Omega's blood, Nala Se urges Omega to escape. Omega frees Crosshair and they go into the jungle, searching for a recently crashed shuttle. Emerie alerts security and a search team are sent. Crosshair and Omega, joined by Batcher, steal the search team's shuttle. They are pursued by fighters, but Hemlock calls them off when Emerie realizes that they need Omega alive because her blood can be used to replicate an M-count.
36	4	"A Different Approach"	Saul Ruiz	Ezra Nachman	February 28, 2024
With their shuttle damaged, Omega and Crosshair crash-land on the planet Lau. At a nearby spaceport, Crosshair wants to use force to hijack a ship but Omega insists on acquiring the money they need to bribe a clerk. While Omega uses her gambling skills to get the money, Batcher is taken by Imperial troops. Omega goes after her and Crosshair reluctantly follows. When they are cornered by Imperials, Omega agrees to let Crosshair use his skills to resolve the situation his way; they defeat the troops, free Batcher, and escape in a stolen freighter. The pair rendezvous with Hunter and Wrecker, who are overjoyed to see Omega but less happy to see Crosshair.
37	5	"The Return"	Nate Villanueva	Amanda Rose Muñoz	March 6, 2024
Echo returns to Pabu, and the Bad Batch discusses the experiments being conducted at Tantiss. Omega has a datapad from the facility that could give them some answers, and Crosshair suggests they access it with an Imperial computer terminal at the outpost on Barton IV. Finding the base abandoned, they divert power from its defense perimeter so they can connect to the datapad. This allows a large creature to attack the base. Crosshair and Hunter distract the creature while the others turn the defense perimeter back on. The Bad Batch leaves the planet with information recovered from the datapad and Crosshair having earned the trust of his squad mates again.
38	6	"Infiltration"	Steward Lee	Brad Rau	March 13, 2024
Guarded by Rex and his fellow rogue clones, former senator Singh meets with Senator Chuchi to discuss their efforts to oppose the Empire. They are attacked by a clone assassin, CX-1, who Rex captures. CX-1 carries a target register that includes Omega, so Rex summons the Bad Batch to his base on Teth. Omega and Crosshair reveal what they know about the ASD's experiments and the "Clone X" assassin program, which strips clones of their identities to make them perfect assassins. Another assassin, CX-2, is sent to kill the captured CX-1, which he does. CX-2 then sees Omega and calls for reinforcements, who are led by clone commander Wolffe.
39	7	"Extraction"	Saul Ruiz	Jennifer Corbett & Matt Michnovetz	March 13, 2024
The Bad Batch, Rex, and a few surviving rogue clones attempt to escape the base, pursued by Wolffe's men and CX-2. CX-2 shoots down the fugitive's escape shuttle, frustrating Wolffe because Omega is needed alive. The fugitives begin a rough trek to an extraction point where they plan to meet Echo and Gregor. CX-2 pursues them and fights Crosshair before falling over a waterfall, from which he later emerges alive. At the extraction point, Wolffe is surprised to see his old friend Rex is alive. Rex tells Wolffe what the Empire is doing to clones, and Wolffe lets them get away. Rex tells Hunter that they need to find out why Omega is so important to the Empire.
40	8	"Bad Territory"	Nate Villanueva	Matt Michnovetz	March 20, 2024
The Bad Batch asks Phee to investigate the Empire's M-count experiments, and she reports that bounty hunters have been hired to search for subjects with high M-counts. Believing Shand may know more about this, Hunter and Wrecker seek her out. Omega and Crosshair stay on Pabu and Omega tries to help Crosshair overcome a mental block that is affecting his sniper skills. Shand offers to provide Hunter and Wrecker with information if they help her capture her current target, Sylar Saris. After they have captured Saris, Shand says she will be in touch with the information. She then secretly informs another party about the Bad Batch and their questions.
41	9	"The Harbinger"	Steward Lee	Jennifer Corbett	March 27, 2024
Shand's contact, Asajj Ventress, comes to Pabu. She tells the Bad Batch that the M-count signifies a person's innate connection to the Force and starts testing Omega's ability using Jedi techniques. The Bad Batch is concerned when they realize Ventress was a Separatist assassin during the Clone Wars, but Omega trusts her. During their final test at sea, Ventress inadvertently summons a sea monster which attacks them. She pacifies the creature and rescues Omega, gaining the Bad Batch's trust. Ventress tells Omega that her M-count is low, but later indicates to the others that she was lying about this. She also warns them that they may not be safe on Pabu.
42	10	"Identity Crisis"	Saul Ruiz	Amanda Rose Muñoz	April 3, 2024
Hemlock imprisons Nala Se, believing she helped Omega and Crosshair escape, and reluctantly promotes Emerie to be the new lead scientist of Project Necromancer. Emerie learns that the subjects being tested on are children with high M-counts that have been delivered to Tantiss by bounty hunters like Bane. She slowly becomes disillusioned with the Empire as she witnesses the cold and restrictive manner in which the children are being treated. Tarkin threatens to take away Hemlock's funding if the ASD does not produce the desired results. CX-2 reports to Hemlock that he is close to finding Omega after learning about her connection to Phee by torturing Cid.
43	11	"Point of No Return"	Nate Villanueva	Amanda Rose Muñoz	April 3, 2024
CX-2 sneaks aboard Phee's ship and retrieves Pabu's location from its navigation computer. Concerned about the risk of staying on Pabu, the Bad Batch prepares to leave the planet when CX-2 arrives and confirms their presence. He destroys the Marauder, seriously injures Wrecker, and calls for reinforcements. With their means of escape cut off, the rest of the Bad Batch evade their pursuers while Hunter tries to steal an Imperial gunship. He is shot down by CX-2. Omega decides to surrender herself, to spare the people of Pabu and hoping the Bad Batch can follow her to Tantiss. However, Crosshair's attempt to plant a tracker fails as CX-2 leaves with Omega.
44	12	"Juggernaut"	Steward Lee	Ezra Nachman	April 10, 2024
CX-2 returns Omega to Tantiss, where Emerie tests her blood and confirms that it is what they need. Hemlock takes Omega to be held with the other young Project Necromancer test subjects. Once the Imperial forces leave Pabu, Crosshair suggests to Hunter and Wrecker that they get the location for Tantiss from Rampart, who is imprisoned in an Imperial labor camp on Erebus. With Phee's help they infiltrate Erebus, hijack a prison transfer vehicle, and escape with Rampart. On Phee's ship, Rampart explains that no one knows Tantiss's coordinates but he is willing to help them find the facility in exchange for not being returned to the labor camp.
45	13	"Into the Breach"	Saul Ruiz	Brad Rau	April 17, 2024
Omega is introduced to her fellow Project Necromancer test subjects: Eva, Jax, Sami, and Bayrn. She tells them that she has escaped from Tantiss before and plans to do so again using a passage behind their cell walls. The Bad Batch and Rampart rendezvous with Echo and a stolen Imperial shuttle, which they use to infiltrate an Imperial relay station at Coruscant to find the coordinates for Tantiss. Unable to extract the information from the station's databanks, Echo decides to sneak aboard a science shuttle bound for Tantiss and disable its proximity sensors. This allows the others to dock on the vessel in their stolen shuttle just as it enters hyperspace.
46	14	"Flash Strike"	Nate Villanueva	Brad Rau	April 24, 2024
Hemlock is alerted that the Bad Batch infiltrated the relay station and sends fighters to intercept the incoming vessel. Hunter, Wrecker, Crosshair, and Rampart are forced to crash near Mount Tantiss and continue on foot, hunted by Stormtrooper patrols. With the base on high alert, Omega takes advantage of the distraction to scout her planned escape route and finds the Zillo Beast in an underground enclosure. In the jungle, Rampart accidentally awakens a large creature that attacks them, is separated from the others, and gets captured. Echo infiltrates the base and encounters Emerie, who tells him about the other children being held with Omega.
47	15	"The Cavalry Has Arrived"	Steward Lee, Saul Ruiz & Brad Rau	Jennifer Corbett	May 1, 2024
The children escape and free the Zillo Beast, which goes on a rampage through the facility, before finding Echo and Emerie. Hunter, Wrecker, and Crosshair infiltrate the base but are captured by Hemlock's CX operatives. Echo and Omega free Nala Se, Rampart, and the other clone prisoners while Emerie takes the other children to safety. Nala Se goes to destroy the facility's data, to protect Omega and prevent the Empire from using her research, but Rampart kills her and plans to use the research for leverage with the Empire. Before she dies, Nala Se uses a grenade to destroy the data and kill Rampart. Hemlock attempts to convert Hunter, Wrecker, and Crosshair into operatives, but Echo, Omega, and the other clones free them and defeat the existing operatives. Hemlock takes Omega hostage, but she helps Hunter and Crosshair kill him. They all escape to Pabu. Tarkin shuts down Tantiss and diverts its funding to Project Stardust. Emerie decides to join Echo in helping other clones while Omega and the Bad Batch remain on Pabu. Years later, an adult Omega leaves to join a rebellion against the Empire.

== Cast and characters ==
=== Starring ===
- Dee Bradley Baker as the Bad Batch:
  Also known as Clone Force 99, the Bad Batch are a unique squad of clone troopers with genetic mutations. Star Wars creator George Lucas wanted them to each have special abilities that made them different from other clones, but he did not want them to be superheroes. The Bad Batch includes: Hunter, the leader of the team who has enhanced senses and is described as a "master tracker"; Wrecker, who has enhanced muscles and a reinforced skeleton making him very strong; Crosshair, a skilled sniper; Tech, a genius who specializes in technology; and Echo, a former regular clone or "reg" who was turned into a cyborg through horrific experimentation and can now interface with computer systems. Despite being clones, Baker made sure the team had noticeable differences in each voice, such as Tech's precision and Crosshair sounding like a "coiled snake".
  - As he did for Star Wars: The Clone Wars, Baker also voices most of the other clones in the series, including: Grey, the captain under Jedi Master Depa Billaba during Order 66; Cut Lawquane, a Clone Wars deserter who goes into hiding with his family; Rex, a former captain who was believed killed at the end of the Clone Wars and now works in secret to help other clones and resist the Empire; Howzer, a captain on Ryloth who supports local freedom fighters over the Empire; Gregor, a commando working with Rex; Wilco, a captain stationed on Serenno who is murdered by Vice Admiral Rampart for refusing to falsify a report; Cody, a commander who deserts after starting to question the Empire during a mission with Crosshair; Cade and Slip, clones who are killed by Rampart as part of a conspiracy to cover-up the destruction of Tipoca City; Scorch, a commando who leads the Advanced Science Division's forces; Mayday, the commander of a desolate outpost on Barton IV whose death is a catalyst for Crosshair turning on the Empire; Fireball and Nemec, members of Rex's group of rogue clones; the Clone X assassins; and Wolffe, a commander sent to capture Omega who is talked down by Rex. Baker added subtle differences to the voice of each clone.
  - Baker reprised the role of Barton Coburn, an Imperial admiral who attends Tarkin's summit, from The Clone Wars. He also provided the sounds for Batcher, a lurca hound that Omega befriends.
- Michelle Ang as Omega:
  A young female clone who joins the Bad Batch. She is an unmodified replication of Jango Fett, so she ages normally unlike the Bad Batch and other clones who age at twice the normal speed. This means Omega is technically older than most of the other clones, despite appearing to be much younger. Her name is a reference to the first unmodified clone of Jango Fett, "Alpha", who is better known as Jango's son Boba. To create Omega's voice, Ang used her own New Zealand accent but altered her pitch and state of mind to give the character a "youthfulness". Ang also took inspiration from watching her young son have new experiences.

=== Recurring ===
==== Introduced in other Star Wars media ====
- Ben Diskin as AZI-3: A medical droid from Kamino who helps the Bad Batch
- Bob Bergen as Lama Su: The prime minister of Kamino
- Gwendoline Yeo as Nala Se: The Kaminoan scientist in charge of the cloning process
- Stephen Stanton as
  - Wilhuff Tarkin: A high-ranking Imperial officer
  - Mas Amedda: The Grand Vizier of the Empire
- Jennifer Hale as Riyo Chuchi: A Pantoran senator who advocates for the clones

==== Introduced in season one ====
- Noshir Dalal as Rampart: An Imperial vice admiral who is responsible for the new conscripted Stormtrooper program
- Liam O'Brien as Bolo: An Ithorian regular at Cid's parlor
- Sam Riegel as Ketch: A Weequay regular at Cid's parlor
- Rhea Perlman as Cid Scaleback: A Trandoshan and former Jedi informant who provides mercenary work to the Bad Batch
- Shelby Young as
  - Bragg: An Imperial captain stationed on Raxus Secundus
  - Yanna: A Wookiee elder
  - Bayrn: A Tarlafar who is a young Project Necromancer test subject with a high M-count
- Helen Sadler as Scalder: A doctor in the Empire's Advanced Science Division

==== Introduced in season two ====
- Wanda Sykes as Phee Genoa: A pirate contact of Cid's who befriends the Bad Batch
- Jimmi Simpson as Royce Hemlock: The director of the Empire's Advanced Science Division (ASD)
- Keisha Castle-Hughes as Emerie Karr: An adult female clone of Jango Fett who works for the ASD

==== Introduced in season three ====
- Ivan Sinitsin as Jax: A Mirialan who is a young Project Necromancer test subject with a high M-count, designated SP-32
- Olwyn M. Whelan as Eva: An Iktotchi who is a young Project Necromancer test subject with a high M-count, designated SP-54
- Naiya Singh Padilla as Sami: A Pantoran who is a young Project Necromancer test subject with a high M-count, designated SP-39

=== Guests ===
==== Introduced in other Star Wars media ====
- Archie Panjabi as Depa Billaba: (Note: Archie Panjabi is credited as a starring actor for her role as Depa Billaba in the series premiere.) A Jedi Master who is killed during Order 66. Her death is depicted differently from how it was established in the Kanan comic book.
- Matthew Wood as
  - The battle droids of the Separatist army
  - Bib Fortuna: The majordomo and right-hand of crime lord Jabba the Hutt
- Freddie Prinze Jr. as Caleb Dume: The Padawan learner of Depa Billaba who escapes Order 66. This is depicted differently from how it was established in the Kanan comic book.
- Ian McDiarmid as Palpatine: The Emperor of the Galactic Empire and a Dark Lord of the Sith
- Andrew Kishino as Saw Gerrera: A freedom fighter from Onderon
- Tom Kane as the narrator of a The Clone Wars-style opening sequence. Because the Clone Wars come to an end in the first episode of the series, the narration is not used for subsequent episodes.
- Nika Futterman as
  - Shaeeah Lawquane: The stepdaughter of clone deserter Cut Lawquane
  - Asajj Ventress:
    The apprentice of Count Dooku during the Clone Wars who later becomes a bounty hunter. The character's last appearance in the Star Wars timeline was the 2015 novel Dark Disciple, which was adapted from unproduced The Clone Wars scripts and story reels. In the book, Ventress falls in love with rogue Jedi Quinlan Vos and sacrifices herself to save him. When executive producer Dave Filoni suggested the character be brought back for the third season of The Bad Batch, the producers worked out a way for Ventress to survive those events which they planned to reveal in a future Star Wars story. Her appearance in The Bad Batch is based on design work done for the unproduced The Clone Wars episodes, including longer hair and a new yellow lightsaber. Futterman was excited to portray a lighter version of the character.
- Kath Soucie as Jek Lawquane: The stepson of clone deserter Cut Lawquane
- Cara Pifko as Suu Lawquane: The wife of clone deserter Cut Lawquane
- Ming-Na Wen as Fennec Shand: An elite mercenary and sniper
- Brigitte Kali as Trace Martez: An ex-smuggler turned freedom fighter and Rafa's younger sister
- Elizabeth Rodriguez as Rafa Martez: An ex-smuggler turned freedom fighter and Trace's older sister
- Corey Burton as
  - Cad Bane: An infamous bounty hunter
  - Gobi Glie: One of Cham Syndulla's freedom fighters and an uncle-figure for Hera Syndulla
- Seth Green as Todo 360: Cad Bane's service droid
- Rena Owen as Taun We: A Kaminoan aide to Lama Su
- Robin Atkin Downes as Cham Syndulla: A famous Twi'lek freedom fighter and the father of Hera Syndulla
- Vanessa Marshall as Hera Syndulla:
  The daughter of Cham Syndulla who is an aspiring pilot and freedom fighter. Marshall previously starred as an older version of Hera in the series Star Wars Rebels, in which she generally used an American accent for the character. However, that series revealed in a key scene that Hera originally had a French accent—representing the native accent of the planet Ryloth—like Cham and other Twi'lek characters do, but she lost this after going off on her own path. Marshall, who is fluent in French, was able to use Hera's native accent for the younger version of the character in The Bad Batch, and also adjusted her voice performance to portray a teenager.
- Phil LaMarr as
  - Orn Free Taa: The corrupt Imperial senator of Ryloth
  - Bail Organa: The Imperial senator from Alderaan who secretly resists the Empire
- Dave Filoni as Chopper: Hera's irritable astromech droid. The series continues the tradition from Star Wars Rebels of crediting Chopper as playing "Himself".
- Jonathan Lipow as Gungi: A Wookiee Jedi youngling on the run from the Empire
- Sharon Duncan-Brewster as Tynnra Pamlo: An Imperial senator from Taris
- Jameelah McMillan as Halle Burtoni: A former senator for Kamino
- Andy de la Tour as Hurst Romodi: An Imperial admiral who attends Tarkin's summit
- Ben Mendelsohn as Orson Krennic: The Imperial commander overseeing "Project Stardust" who attends Tarkin's summit
- Daniel Logan as Mox and Julian Dennison as Deke and Stak: Three young clones of Jango Fett who are abandoned by the Empire

==== Introduced in season one ====
- Emilio Garcia-Sanchez as ES-01: A member of Crosshair's elite conscripted trooper squad
- Dahéli Hall as ES-04: A member of Crosshair's elite conscripted trooper squad
- Tina Huang as ES-02: A member of Crosshair's elite conscripted trooper squad
- Ness Bautista as ES-03: A member of Crosshair's elite conscripted trooper squad
- Sian Clifford as GS-8: The protocol droid of Senator Avi Singh
- Alexander Siddig (season 1) and Danny Jacobs (season 3) as Avi Singh: A senator from the former Separatist planet Raxus Secundus
- Ferelith Young as Eleni Syndulla: The wife of Cham and mother of Hera
- Tom Taylorson as Roland Durand: A Devaronian and high-ranking member of the Durand crime family

==== Introduced in season two ====
- Héctor Elizondo as Romar Adell: a citizen of Serenno who helps the Bad Batch
- Max Mittelman as Grotton: the new Imperial governor of Desix
- Tasia Valenza as Tawni Ames: the Separatist governor of Desix who opposes the Empire's occupation
- Ernie Hudson as Grini Millegi: a Dowutin gangster and business rival of Cid's who oversees races on Safa Toma
- Ben Schwartz as TAY-0: Cid's cocky droid racer on Safa Toma
- J. P. Karliak as Babwa Venomor: a Trandoshan mercenary working for the Empire on Kashyyyk
- Jonathan Lipow as Mokko: The cruel boss of a mining facility
- Yuri Lowenthal as Benni Baro: A teenage scavenger who works in Mokko's mine
- Crispin Freeman as Nolan: An Imperial lieutenant with a disdain for clones who Crosshair kills
- Andy Allo as Lyana Hazard: The daughter of Pabu mayor Shep who befriends Omega
- Imari Williams as Shep Hazard: The mayor of Pabu, father of Lyana, and a friend of Phee

==== Introduced in season three ====
- Anjelica Huston as Isa Durand: The leader of the Durand crime family
- Harry Lloyd as Mann: A corrupt Imperial officer on the planet Lau who gambles with Omega

== Production ==
=== Development ===
After Disney acquired Lucasfilm in October 2012, the animated Star Wars television series Star Wars: The Clone Wars was canceled in March 2013. A new animated series, Star Wars Rebels, was prioritized. Lucasfilm said some unfinished episodes of The Clone Wars would still be released as "bonus content", including a four episode arc that introduces a squad of clone troopers with genetic mutations known as the Bad Batch. The idea for this story came directly from Star Wars creator George Lucas. The four episodes were shown as unfinished story reels at Star Wars Celebration Anaheim in April 2015. By September 2016, The Clone Wars and Rebels supervising director Dave Filoni had stepped back from that position on Rebels so he could focus on writing that series and on developing future Star Wars series with Lucasfilm Animation.

In July 2018, Filoni announced that a final season of The Clone Wars was being produced for the new streaming service Disney+. The unfinished Bad Batch episodes were completed for the season, with some changes, while development on a spin-off series focused on the Bad Batch began at the same time. Disney+ announced the spin-off series, titled Star Wars: The Bad Batch, in July 2020. The announcement described the series as being Filoni's vision, and he was executive producing alongside Lucasfilm's Athena Portillo, supervising director Brad Rau, and head writer Jennifer Corbett, with Lucasfilm's Carrie Beck and Josh Rimes as co-executive producer and producer, respectively. Filoni described the series as being "very much in the vein" of The Clone Wars and said it would stay true to Lucas's vision for that series of telling epic, exciting adventure stories.

A second season was announced in August 2021, before the first-season finale was released. At Star Wars Celebration London in April 2023, a third and final season was announced. The producers intended to tell a three-season story from the beginning and were glad to be able to complete their plans as intended. Rau said the series would end the Bad Batch's story, but would not be the end of the "Clone Wars universe".

=== Casting and voice recording ===
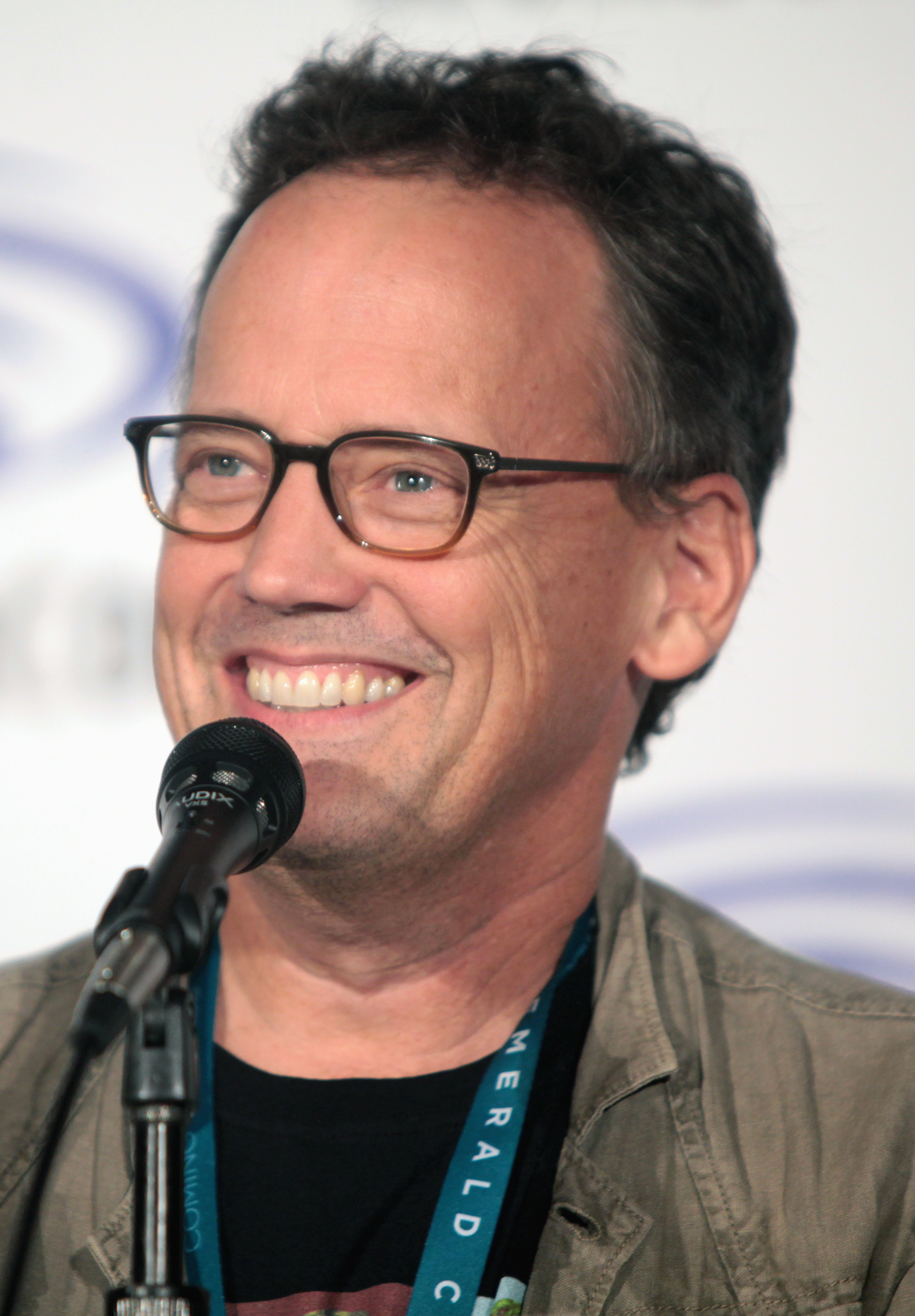
Dee Bradley Baker voices the Bad Batch and other clones in the series.

The first trailer for the series, which was released in December 2020, confirmed that Dee Bradley Baker would return from The Clone Wars as the voice of all the clone troopers, including the members of the Bad Batch, Captain Rex, and many others. Baker replaced New Zealand actor Temuera Morrison, who portrayed the clones—as well as the bounty hunter Jango Fett whose genetic material the clones are created from—in the Star Wars prequel films. Also starring in The Bad Batch is Michelle Ang as Omega, a young female clone of Jango Fett. Ang was cast in-part because her New Zealand accent aligns with Morrison's, and she was grateful for the opportunity to embrace that side of her identity considering she does not look like "what the world thinks of when they think New Zealander" as a person of Chinese and Malaysian descent. Baker and Ang recorded the first episode of the series together, but other work commitments forced Ang to travel home to New Zealand soon after and the COVID-19 pandemic prevented her from returning to record with Baker for many subsequent episodes. Ang instead recorded much of her dialogue for the series remotely over video calls. Ang and Baker were able to record the series finale together in-person, which they said was an emotional experience for them and the crew.

Emerie Karr, an adult female clone, is introduced in the second season. Voice actor Keisha Castle-Hughes was not told that Emerie is a clone at first, but she suspected that the character was related to Omega after the producers asked her to use her natural New Zealand accent for the role. Castle-Hughes previously had a brief non-speaking role as Queen Apailana in the film Star Wars: Episode III – Revenge of the Sith (2005). Daniel Logan, who portrayed Boba Fett and other young male clones in the prequel films and The Clone Wars, returned to voice a younger clone named Mox in the third season of The Bad Batch. Mox is accompanied by two even younger clones, Deke and Stak, who are voiced by Logan's fellow New Zealand actor Julian Dennison.

A younger version of the character Fennec Shand from The Mandalorian was revealed to be appearing in the series with the first trailer's release, and actress Ming-Na Wen soon confirmed that she would reprise her role as Shand. The trailer also revealed that Stephen Stanton and Andrew Kishino were reprising their respective The Clone Wars roles as Tarkin and Saw Gerrera. Other actors who reprised roles from The Clone Wars in the first season include Ben Diskin as AZI-3; Matthew Wood as the battle droids; Bob Bergen as Lama Su; Gwendoline Yeo as Nala Se; Nika Futterman, Kath Soucie, and Cara Pifko as the family of clone deserter Cut Lawquane; Brigitte Kali and Elizabeth Rodriguez as the Martez sisters; Corey Burton as Cad Bane and Seth Green as Bane's droid Todo 360; and Tom Kane, who narrated the opening of each The Clone Wars episode, provided similar narration for The Bad Batch's premiere episode.

Reprising roles from the Star Wars films in the first season are Ian McDiarmid as Emperor Palpatine, Wood as Bib Fortuna, and Rena Owen as Taun We. The producers knew early in development that the first episode would begin with a retelling of Order 66 from the perspective of the Bad Batch, and decided to include the Jedi Depa Billaba and Caleb Dume since many viewers would already be familiar with the latter from Rebels, where he is known as Kanan Jarrus. The two characters had brief non-speaking appearances in the final season of The Clone Wars before appearing in The Bad Batch, with Archie Panjabi cast as Billaba. The producers considered casting a new young voice actor as Caleb before Filoni reached out to Kanan actor Freddie Prinze Jr. about reprising his role. Rau felt Prinze was able to bring the right energy for the younger version of the character, as well as added emotion due to his connection to Kanan. Later in the season, a young version of the Rebels character Hera Syndulla is introduced with Vanessa Marshall reprising her role. This storyline includes some related characters returning from The Clone Wars or Rebels: Robin Atkin Downes as Hera's father Cham, Burton as Gobi Glie, Phil LaMarr as Orn Free Taa, and Filoni as Hera's droid Chopper who is credited as playing "Himself". Hera's mother Eleni, who was only mentioned in Rebels, is introduced in The Bad Batch voiced by Ferelith Young. Also introduced in the season are Noshir Dalal as Vice Admiral Rampart and Rhea Perlman as Cid.

In December 2022, Wanda Sykes was revealed to have been cast in the guest role of Phee Genoa for the second season. The season also introduces Jimmi Simpson as Dr. Hemlock, who replaces Rampart as the primary antagonist of the series. Reprising roles from The Clone Wars in the second season are Stanton as Mas Amedda, Jennifer Hale as Riyo Chuchi, LaMarr as Bail Organa, and Jameelah McMillan as Halle Burtoni. The season also features several actors reprising their roles from the film Rogue One: A Star Wars Story (2016): Sharon Duncan-Brewster as Tynnra Pamlo, Andy de la Tour as Hurst Romodi, and Ben Mendelsohn as Orson Krennic. For the third season, Futterman reprises her The Clone Wars role as Asajj Ventress. The producers wanted to cast child actors for the young Project Necromancer test subjects that are introduced in the season. Ivan Sinitsin was cast as Jax, Olwyn M. Whelan as Eva, and Naiya Singh Padilla as Sami. Shelby Young, who had several guest roles in the series, provided vocals for the baby test subject Bayrn.

=== Music ===
Kevin Kiner was confirmed to be composing the score for the series in January 2021, after previously doing so for The Clone Wars and Rebels. As with the other animated Star Wars series, Kevin collaborated with his children Sean and Deana. David Glen Russell and Peter Lam also provided additional music. Sean and Deana Kiner are credited as co-composers with Kevin Kiner for the third season.

Kevin described the score for The Bad Batch as a continuation of his work on The Clone Wars, using a mix of electronic and orchestral music, and said it would continue to evolve just as the music of The Clone Wars evolved over its run. He took influence from the scores for The Guns of Navarone (1961) and The Dirty Dozen (1967) which both feature a similar band of heroes to the Bad Batch.

Walt Disney Records released the first track from the series' score, titled "Enter the Bad Batch", as a digital single on May 13, 2021. The label then released Kiner's score for the series in two-volume soundtrack albums for each season: music from the first eight episodes of the first season was released on June 25; from the final eight episodes of the first season on August 20; from the first eight episodes of the second season on February 17, 2023; from the final eight episodes of the second season on April 7; from the first eight episodes of the third season on March 29, 2024; and from the final seven episodes of the third season on May 3.

== Marketing ==
Lucasfilm president Kathleen Kennedy promoted the series at Disney's Investor Day event on December 10, 2020, revealing the first trailer for the series. Jacob Oller of Syfy Wire felt the trailer made the series look like a more action-heavy version of The Clone Wars, and compared it to the 1980s television series The A-Team. Ahead of the series premiere, characters from the series were also added to the mobile role-playing game Star Wars: Galaxy of Heroes as unlockable, playable characters.

== Release ==
Star Wars: The Bad Batch premiered on Disney+ on May 4, 2021, which is Star Wars Day, with a special 70-minute episode. The rest of the 16-episode first season was released until August 13. The 16-episode second season was released from January 4 to March 29, 2023; it was originally expected to premiere on September 28, 2022. The final 15-episode season was released from February 21 to May 1, 2024.

== Reception ==
=== Viewership ===
Whip Media, which tracks viewership data for the more than 1 million daily users of its TV Time app, calculated that Star Wars: The Bad Batch was the most anticipated new television series in May 2021. It later ranked as the fourth most anticipated returning series in September 2022. Nielsen Media Research, which records streaming viewership on U.S. television screens, estimated that Star Wars: The Bad Batch was watched for 251 million minutes, making it the seventh most streamed original series, from May 3—9, 2021. According to Whip Media's TV Time viewership tracking app, the series ranked as the third most streamed original series across all platforms for five consecutive weeks, from January 8 to February 5, 2023. It subsequently remained within the top ten rankings from February 12 to March 19. Nielsen Media Research announced in 2022 that Star Wars: The Bad Batch and What If...? each appeared on its streaming charts for a combined total of seven weeks from May to October, collectively accumulating approximately 2 billion minutes of viewing time. Luminate, which measures streaming performance in the United States using viewership data, audience engagement metrics, and content reach across multiple platforms, reported that Star Wars: The Bad Batch was streamed for 923 million minutes in 2024. Luminate subsequently announced that Star Wars: The Bad Batch was streamed for 368.1 million minutes during the first half of 2026.

=== Critical response ===
Critical response of Star Wars: The Bad Batch
Season	Rotten Tomatoes	Metacritic
1	86% (93 reviews)	67 (9 reviews)
2	90% (21 reviews)	—N/a
3	88% (17 reviews)	68 (4 reviews)

The review aggregator website Rotten Tomatoes reported an 86% approval rating with an average rating of 7.3/10, based on 92 reviews for the first season. The website's critics consensus reads, "The Bad Batch's beautifully animated adventure may be too lore heavy for casual viewers, but fans will enjoy diving deeper into this dastardly cast of characters." Metacritic, which uses a weighted average, assigned a score of 67 out of 100, based on 9 critics, indicating "generally favorable reviews". The second season has an 90% approval rating on Rotten Tomatoes, with an average rating of 7.2/10, based on 21 reviews. The website's critic consensus reads: "The second bundle of The Bad Batch retains all the same virtues and vices as the first: a slick Star Wars adventure geared toward diehard fans at the expense of more casual viewers." The third season holds an 87% approval rating on Rotten Tomatoes, with an average rating of 8.0/10, based on 15 reviews. The website's critic consensus reads: "Mobilizing for one last hurrah with plenty of easter eggs and rousing action still left in its arsenal, The Bad Batch ends on a good note." On Metacritic, the third season has a score of 68 out of 100, based on 4 critic reviews, indicating "generally favorable reviews".

Joel Keller of Decider called the series a "worthy" spinoff of Star Wars: The Clone Wars and praised the introduction of Omega as a female main character, writing, "Star Wars: The Bad Batch should satisfy Clone Wars fans and give completist fans of the franchise a chance to see what happened at the very beginning of the Empire." Joshua Rivera of Polygon gave the show a positive review and stated, "The prequels are just as full of rich potential as the original Star Wars trilogy, and The Bad Batch, like The Clone Wars before it, is set to do a lot of slow, careful work to tease out that potential." Wenlei Ma of News.com.au gave the show a positive review and stated, "The Bad Batch is catnip for the dedicated Star Wars fans. It's an animated action-adventure series with thrills, relatable characters on the right side of the war, blaster guns and enough lore and easter eggs to invoke a few excited squeals."

Vincent Schilling of Indian Country Today gave the show 8.5 out of 10 stars and stated, "I'm not a superfan of Star Wars animated series, but I am impressed with this one, a team of certifiable rejects, each with their own skillset, is a winning formula for me – excellent actually." Jesse Schdeen of IGN gave the premiere episode an 8 out of 10 rating, stating that the series is "a worthy successor to The Clone Wars, so much so that it could easily be rebranded as an eighth season" and that "it uses a loose end from that show to build a brand new story about the plight of clones after the war's end, and it's one that immediately resonates". He also added that the show "captures a lot of what made The Clone Wars so great (including the slick animation style and the vocal talents of Baker), but it doesn't entirely escape that show's flaws, either". Julian Lytle of idobi.com gave the show 8 out of 10 stars and stated, "The Bad Batch feels familiar but also starts a new journey with new characters in a cool setting. I can't wait to see what happens with this group in the Empire." Marty Brown of Common Sense Media gave the show 4 out of 5 stars and a '10+' age rating, stating, "This series delivers on precisely what fans would expect from a Star Wars story: world building, unique new characters, and big action sequences with a moral allegory at the center."

Jonathan Roberts of The New Paper gave the show 2.5 out of 5 stars and stated, "The Bad Batch is good to dip into, but it can make for a bad binge." Niv M. Sultan of Slant Magazine rated the series 1.5 out of 4 stars and stated, "The show's attempt to individualize its protagonists largely reduces them to predictable, banal archetypes."

Kimberly Terasaki of The Mary Sue expressed concerns over the series "whitewashing" the clone troopers, writing that "the designs of some characters seemed to make many of them lighter-skinned and/or with more European features... Long story short: clones of a character played by a Māori man had been white-washed." This concern was also noticed by fans, spawning a Twitter page, an Instagram page, and a Change.org petition. In response to these concerns, supervising director Brad Rau said the animation team had gone back through the produced episode and adjusted the skin tones of the clones to be closer to that of film actor Temuera Morrison.

The show has also received praise for its representation of people with disabilities. Emily Smith of Radio Times noted that prior to The Bad Batch, most disabilities in the Star Wars universe were associated with negativity, such as with antagonists Darth Vader and Darth Maul, who became amputees after combat. Other characters, like Luke Skywalker and Kanan Jarrus, were negatively affected after being injured by antagonists. In contrast, the original four Bad Batch characters were born with disabilities, which Smith said frees their disability from any connotation. Joshua Patton of CBR complimented the show for portraying a kid-friendly conversation about neurodivergency, highlighting a quote from Tech in season two, episode nine: "I may process moments and thoughts differently, but that does not mean that I feel any less than you".

=== Accolades ===
The first season is one of 200 television series that received the ReFrame Stamp for the years 2021 to 2022. The stamp is awarded by the gender equity coalition ReFrame and industry database IMDbPro for film and television projects that are proven to have gender-balanced hiring, with stamps being awarded to projects that hire female-identifying people, especially women of color, in four out of eight key roles for their production.

Year	Award	Category	Nominee(s)	Result	Ref.
2022	Golden Reel Awards	Outstanding Achievement in Sound Editing – Animation Series or Short	Matthew Wood, David W. Collins, Frank Rinella, and Kimberly Patrick (for "Reunion")	Nominated	
2022	Saturn Awards	Best Animated Series on Television	Star Wars: The Bad Batch	Won	
2024	Golden Reel Awards	Outstanding Achievement in Sound Editing – Broadcast Animation	David W. Collins, Matthew Wood, Justin Doyle, Kevin Bolen, Kimberly Patrick, Frank Rinella, Margie O'Malley, and Andrea Gard (for "Faster")	Won	
2024	Producers Guild Awards	Outstanding Children's Program	Star Wars: The Bad Batch	Nominated	
2024	Saturn Awards	Best Animated Television Series or Special	Star Wars: The Bad Batch	Won	
2025	Saturn Awards	Best Animated Television Series	Star Wars: The Bad Batch	Won	
