= Part IV (Obi-Wan Kenobi) =

- Obi-Wan Kenobi episode
- Episode no.: Episode 4
- Directed by: Deborah Chow
- Written by: Joby Harold; Hannah Friedman
- Cinematography by: Chung Chung-hoon
- Original release date: June 8, 2022
- Running time: 39 minutes

Cast
- Ryder McLaughlin as Wade; Joss Glennie-Smith as the Fortress Inquisitorius Security Guard; David Will No as the Fortress Inquisitorius Terminal Officer; Johnathan Ho and Oliver Ho as Jedi Younglings; Helen Day as the Fortress Inquisitorius Officer

Episode chronology
← Previous "Part III"	Next → "Part V"

"Part IV" is the fourth episode of the American streaming television series Obi-Wan Kenobi. It follows Obi-Wan Kenobi as he collaborates with the Path network to rescue Princess Leia from the Fortress Inquisitorius. It is set in the Star Wars universe, occurring ten years after the film Revenge of the Sith (2005). The episode was written by Joby Harold & Hannah Friedman, and directed by Deborah Chow.

The episode stars Ewan McGregor as Obi-Wan Kenobi, who reprises his role from the Star Wars prequel trilogy, alongside co-stars Indira Varma, Vivien Lyra Blair, Moses Ingram, O'Shea Jackson Jr., Maya Erskine, Sung Kang, Rya Kihlstedt, and Hayden Christensen. Chow was hired in September 2019, and following rewrites of the script, Harold became the head writer and showrunner. Both executive produce alongside McGregor, Michelle Rejwan, and Kathleen Kennedy, while the episode is produced by Thomas Hayslip and Katterli Frauenfelder.

"Part IV" was released on the streaming service Disney+ on June 8, 2022. It received mixed reviews; critics praised the visuals, action sequences, and performances, but some criticized its plot elements and writing.

== Plot ==
Having escaped Darth Vader, Obi-Wan and Tala infiltrate the Inquisitors' stronghold on the ocean moon of Nur in the Mustafar system to rescue a captured Leia, who is being interrogated by the Third Sister. During the infiltration, Obi-Wan discovers a vault full of preserved, dead Jedi that the Empire had captured. While they are successful in freeing Leia, Tala's cover is blown and they have to fight their way out, escaping with the help of Roken and his guerilla troops. An enraged Vader threatens to kill the Third Sister for her failure, but spares her when she reveals she has put a tracker on the group. Back on the ship, the tracker is revealed to be placed in Leia's companion droid, Lola.

== Production ==
=== Development ===
By August 2017, Lucasfilm was developing a spin-off film focusing Ewan McGregor's Obi-Wan Kenobi from the Star Wars prequel trilogy. However, following the project's cancellation due to the financial failure of Solo: A Star Wars Story (2018), McGregor entered negotiations to star in a six-episode Disney+ limited series centered around Kenobi. The series was officially announced by Lucasfilm president Kathleen Kennedy at the 2019 D23 event. Deborah Chow was hired to direct all episodes for the series by September 2019, while Joby Harold became the head writer and showrunner in April 2020 following Kennedy's disapproval with the scripts and subsequent rewrites. The series is executive produced by Harold, Chow, McGregor, Kennedy, and Michelle Rejwan. Chow and Harold wanted the series to be a character study for Kenobi, and worked to connect elements from the prequel trilogy and original trilogy. Harold wanted to further explore Kenobi's character following the events of Order 66 and wanted him to deal with issues from his past. Chow also took inspirations from "gritty, poetic westerns" including The Assassination of Jesse James by the Coward Robert Ford (2007), The Proposition (2005), and the works of Akira Kurosawa.

=== Writing ===
Head writer Joby Harold wrote the scene where Kenobi discovers the Jedi vault in the Fortress Inquisitorius with the intention of making Kenobi confront the reality of "what has happened to the galaxy and also what's happened to the Jedi", as he was originally a recluse living on a cave in Tatooine "somewhat cut off" from reality. He also added that Kenobi's confrontation of reality and being "faced with this harsh horror" was an important part in Kenobi's overall journey. He conceived of showing the Jedi corpses within the vault in the Fortress Inquisitorius as he wanted to include something "within the bowels of that facility" that would be "shocking" and "consistent with Star Wars". He wanted it to be "something that really felt like a gut-punch for Obi-Wan in that moment" and compared the Jedi corpses in the vault to being "pinned butterflies on the wall". While writing Reva's interrogation of Leia for information on the Path network, Harold was aware that Leia had Force powers, but did not want to be "very overt with Leia's Force sensitivity" and instead wrote the scene to be a reference for the audience. He also added that the scene revolved around the two characters and "we didn't want to step out of the scene and start to say, 'Here she is in her journey towards Force sensitivity'". Furthermore, Harold also felt the episode marked a turning point in Kenobi's overall character arc, as he had begun to recover his powers, stating that he is "starting to need to find that part of himself again" in order to rescue Leia. Chow also wanted to emphasize that the Rebellion movement had not begun to form yet, despite opposition to the Galactic Empire. Harold had described it as "people doing the best they can" rather than being "freedom fighters", and ultimately felt Tala epitomized that particular concept.

=== Casting ===
The episode stars Ewan McGregor as Obi-Wan Kenobi, and features co-stars Indira Varma as Tala Durith, Vivien Lyra Blair as Princess Leia, Moses Ingram as Reva Sevander / Third Sister, O'Shea Jackson Jr. as Roken, Maya Erskine as Sully, Sung Kang as the Fifth Brother, Rya Kihlstedt as the Fourth Sister, and Hayden Christensen as Anakin Skywalker / Darth Vader. James Earl Jones also provides the voice for Darth Vader. Also appearing are Ryder McLaughlin as Wade, Joss Glennie-Smith as the Fortress Inquisitorius Security Guard, David Will No as the Fortress Inquisitorius Terminal Officer, Johnathan Ho and Oliver Ho as Jedi Younglings, and Helen Day as the Fortress Inquisitorius Officer.

=== Design ===
When designing for the episode, the production team used some of the same designs from other Star Wars media. Fortress Inquisitorius and the ocean moon of Nur that featured in "Part IV" were first introduced by Star Wars Jedi: Fallen Order (2019). Additionally, Jedi Master Tera Sinube from the Star Wars: The Clone Wars (2008-2013, 2020) animated series is featured in the episode's tomb scene in the Fortress. Harold had said that "I know that that was a massive benefit to them [design team], and an exciting opportunity to look to that and help weave everything together within bigger cannon".

=== Filming and visual effects ===
Principal photography began on May 4, 2021, on the annual Star Wars Day celebration, with Deborah Chow directing, and Chung-hoon Chung serving as cinematographer. The series had used the StageCraft video wall technology provided by Industrial Light & Magic (ILM). Filming had taken place in The Volume set, the soundstage in which the StageCraft technology is implemented, at the Manhattan Beach Studios.

Visual effects for the episode were created by ILM, Hybride, Image Engine, Important Looking Pirates, Soho VFX, Wētā FX, Blind LTD, and ReDefine.

=== Music ===
Natalie Holt was hired as composer for the series, making her the first woman to score a live-action Star Wars project, while John Williams composed the "Obi-Wan Theme". Originally, Chow and Holt was not sure if they could use Williams' compositions for the series, and as such, Holt created her own theme for Kenobi. Following Williams' composition for Kenobi's theme, Holt's original Kenobi theme became "Holding Hands", the musical track for when Kenobi and Leia hold hands in the episode as Chow liked her composition.

== Marketing ==
After the episode, Lucasfilm announced merchandise inspired by the episode as part of its weekly "Obi-Wan Wednesdays" promotion for each episode of the series, including a Funko Pop for Tala, a series of Retro Collection figures for Kenobi, Vader, the Grand Inquisitor, NED-B, and the Fifth Brother, a Lego set for Kenobi and Vader's duel from the previous episode, and a Mattel plush figure for Lola. Additionally, Lucasfilm and Disney revealed posters they had created in a collaboration with artists from Poster Posse for the series.

== Reception ==
=== Critical response ===
The review aggregator website Rotten Tomatoes reports a 69% approval rating with an average rating of 6.80/10, based on 35 reviews. The site's critical consensus reads, "Obi-Wan Kenobi "Part IV" is a slick caper in a (space) vacuum, but there is an anxious sense that this saga is spinning its wheels when it can't afford to waste its limited runtime".

Bradley Russell from Total Film gave the episode 3 out of 5 stars, calling it a "a so-so episode that counts as the series' first real minor disappointment". He felt the episode's plot of Kenobi and Tala Durith rescuing Princess Leia was derivative of The Mandalorian episodes "Chapter 6: The Prisoner" and "Chapter 15: The Believer". He felt Reva had too much screen-time in the episode, though he praised Blair's performance. He also highlighted Chow's direction, praising the visuals of the action scenes in the episode, and additionally opined that the episode was "a treat for Jedi: Fallen Order [sic] fans". He also praised the production design for the Fortress Inquisitorius, but criticized the visuals and design of the escape sequence, negatively comparing it to The Mandalorian and a then-released Andor trailer. He liked Vader's scene, writing that it provides "the episode with a much-needed jolt of energy", though he criticized Vader's decision for keeping Reva alive, and ultimately concluded by stating "it's likely that this [episode] will feel like an anomaly – an episode that doesn't quite match up to what's come before it". Megan Crouse at Den of Geek gave the episode a 4 out of 5 stars, also highlighting the production design for Fortress Inquisitorius. She also praised the cinematography and direction, in particular commending the lighting during scenes featuring Kenobi's lightsabers, and lauded both Blair and McGregor's performance. However, she criticized the writing for Reva's character, some of the visual effects for the water, and felt that towards the end of the episode, it focused more on the action sequences rather than its characterization, writing that it "excels at bringing different characters' action-heavy plot threads together into a whole that progresses both plot and character beats. But when it has to drop something, it drops the latter". Giving the episode a B grade, Manuel Betancourt of The A.V. Club heavily praised Kenobi's gradual improvement in his Force abilities, and highlighted the beginning scene in which both Kenobi and Vader were in bacta tanks, which he felt "a lovely mirrored moment when Master and Padawan are connected yet again, making their trajectories feel even more intertwined than they once were" and compared it to Revenge of the Sith. He also praised Ingram's performance in the episode, writing she is "slowly emerging as the MVP of the series", noting Reva's characterization and her determination in completing her objectives. He also praised the overall plot of the episode, saying that it "successfully pulls off a grade-A heist/rescue", and Chow's direction of her action scenes.

At IGN, Matt Purslow described the episode as being "devoid of the emotion and character development that has previously made Kenobi such a great watch ... episode four is the season's first misstep". He felt the episode's plot was too derivative from the Death Star infiltration in A New Hope and perceived it as being a "overly straight and simple rollout of events". He also opined that there was not any emotional depth in the episode as there were "no meaningful advancement on these emotions this week and thus no complex problems for Obi-Wan to contend with", and rated the episode a 6 out of 10. Meanwhile, Vulture's Jesse Hassenger gave the episode a 2 out of 5. He also criticized the plot of the episode, perceiving it to be too "straightforward", and labelling the episode overall as being "a murky stew of regret, occasional badassery, and self-seriousness". He felt that Reva's general character was improved during the interrogation scene with Leia, but criticized some of the dialogue in the scene and felt was derivative of other movies and shows. Additionally, he praised the Jedi tomb vault scene, and concluded his review by stating "The shared pain of Obi-Wan and Reva is there, somewhere, hinting at something more complicated and regretful. But the show only has two episodes left to dig a little deeper and turn those old Jedi reflexes into something new". Germain Lussier, writing for Gizmodo, gave the episode a mixed review. He negatively labelled the episode as being a mix of A New Hope and Star Wars Jedi: Fallen Order, and was disappointed as the episodes focused on Kenobi rescuing Leia, which he thought was already explored in the series and was in favor of an original plot. However, he also praised the Jedi tomb vault scene, action sequences, Kenobi and Leia's chemistry, and both Ingram and Varma's performance in the scene where Reva finds out that Tala was a member of the Path network.
