= Part III (Obi-Wan Kenobi) =

- Obi-Wan Kenobi episode
- Promotional poster
- Episode no.: Episode 3
- Directed by: Deborah Chow
- Written by: Joby Harold; Hannah Friedman; Hossein Amini; Stuart Beattie
- Cinematography by: Chung Chung-hoon
- Original release date: June 1, 2022
- Running time: 48 minutes

Cast
- Dustin Ceithamer as NED-B; AJ Troup as Stormtrooper #1; Shane Hartline as Stormtrooper #2; Ardeshir Radpour as Checkpoint Stormtrooper; Melanie Mosley as Safehouse Stormtrooper #1; Will Westwater as Safehouse Stormtrooper #2

Episode chronology
← Previous "Part II"	Next → "Part IV"

"Part III" is the third episode of the American streaming television series Obi-Wan Kenobi, based on Star Wars created by George Lucas. It follows Obi-Wan Kenobi and Leia Organa as they attempt to hide from the Inquisitors and Darth Vader. It is set in the Star Wars universe, occurring ten years after the film Star Wars: Episode III – Revenge of the Sith (2005). The episode was written by Joby Harold & Hannah Friedman and Hossein Amini and Stuart Beattie, while Deborah Chow directed the episode.

The episode stars Ewan McGregor as Obi-Wan Kenobi, who reprises his role from the Star Wars prequel trilogy, alongside co-stars Vivien Lyra Blair, Moses Ingram, Sung Kang, Rya Kihlstedt, Zach Braff, Indira Varma, and Hayden Christensen. Chow was hired to direct in 2019, and following rewrites of the script, Harold became the head writer and showrunner. Both executive produce alongside McGregor, Michelle Rejwan, and Kathleen Kennedy, while the episode is produced by Thomas Hayslip and Katterli Frauenfelder.

"Part III" was released on the streaming service Disney+ on June 1, 2022. Critics highlighted the duel between Darth Vader and Obi-Wan Kenobi, and praised Vader and Kenobi's characterization, and Chow's direction, though some critics felt the duel was underwhelming and expressed minor criticisms of some of the episode's visual effects.

== Plot ==
Darth Vader instructs the Third Sister (Reva Sevander) to find his former Jedi Master-turned-enemy Obi-Wan Kenobi, promising her the position of Grand Inquisitor if she succeeds. Kenobi and Leia Organa's transport lands on the planet Mapuzo, and they proceed to the rendezvous con man Haja Estree provided. Finding no one there, they accept a ride on an Imperial transport. Reva tracks them and alerts the Imperial garrison, but they receive help from a female Imperial Officer, Tala, who reveals that she is a member of an underground network helping enemies of the Empire go underground. Before they can leave, the Inquisitors appear with Darth Vader, who brutally kills some of the townsfolk to lure Kenobi out. Kenobi sends Leia and Tala ahead while he delays their pursuers. After a lightsaber duel, Vader catches Kenobi in a Force choke and sets him on fire. Tala returns with a distraction, enabling her to rescue Kenobi. Reva catches up to Leia, who flees from her.

== Production ==
=== Development ===
By August 2017, Lucasfilm was developing a spin-off film focusing Ewan McGregor's Obi-Wan Kenobi from the Star Wars prequel trilogy. However, following the project's cancellation due to the financial failure of Solo: A Star Wars Story (2018), McGregor entered negotiations to star in a six-episode Disney+ limited series centered around Kenobi. The series was officially announced by Lucasfilm president Kathleen Kennedy at the 2019 D23 event. Deborah Chow was hired to direct all episodes for the series by September 2019, while Joby Harold became the head writer and showrunner in April 2020 following Kennedy's disapproval with the scripts and subsequent rewrites. The series is executive produced by Harold, Chow, McGregor, Kennedy, and Michelle Rejwan. Chow and Harold wanted the series to be a character study for Kenobi, and worked to connect elements from the prequel trilogy and original trilogy. Harold wanted to further explore Kenobi's character following the events of Order 66 and wanted him to deal with issues from his past. Chow also took inspirations from "gritty, poetic westerns" including The Assassination of Jesse James by the Coward Robert Ford (2007), The Proposition (2005), and the works of Akira Kurosawa.

=== Writing ===
Harold wanted Kenobi to find hope when he meets Tala and learns about the Path network, saying "The notion that he [Kenobi] would find it, even if it's the smallest glimmer of it, on his journey and have it reignite, which is a part of what Episode Three is ... and that he's not alone". He had also written a scene where Kenobi imagines Anakin Skywalker staring at him while travelling Mapuzo with Princess Leia, and had felt it was "very potent because it's not a catch-up flashback at the beginning of an episode or a dream sequence. It's letting the audience in on how caught up Obi-Wan is as he's having this conversation with Leia". He wanted to include the reference to Padmé Amidala as he had felt she was also another important character in the episode, explaining that "it works because it's about Leia within the scene. Padmé is the chess piece within which we get to have that character relationship evolve. And that makes her vital, as opposed to just a piece of the context of canon". The episode also mentions Quinlan Vos, as Harold wanted Kenobi to realize "there was The Path and realizing that other people have been helping and that there have been Jedi helping. Realizing that, 'I've been in a cave, while other people have been doing that,' is a part of his [Kenobi's] awareness and the expansion of his consciousness. So finding the right person to be the personification of that fight that had been occurring was very, very important". Harold also noted he felt it was important to acknowledge the Star Wars fanbase and the canon of Star Wars.

Harold wanted to "define Darth Vader's anger and rage", adding "There's an emotionality to the choices he's [Vader] making that are a little further than we're used to seeing with Vader". He wanted to include the scene where Vader harasses the bystanders on Mapuzo as he felt it would be "very gratifying to see Vader finally be unleashed in a sequence like that". He also noted that Vader had intentionally harassed the bystanders as Vader knew that the Jedi cannot "stand by and watch innocents be killed", and had performed the act deliberately to lure Kenobi. He described the sequence as being "scary", and said that it was written intentionally to elicit fear, as the "horror of the moment has an emotional weight because it's calculated". Harold had also felt that Kenobi and Vader having another confrontation prior to their encounter in A New Hope (1977) would not deviate from canon, saying "we've informed those scenes [in A New Hope] so that some of the choices that we've taken for granted in the [original trilogy] actually make more sense now". When writing Kenobi and Vader's lightsaber duel, he wanted to subvert expectations that the confrontation would happen towards the end of the series. Instead, he opted to include it in the episode, as he felt it would be "felt like a juicy thing to do at the midpoint of the show, to suddenly throw them together before anybody was expecting it and to actually see what would happen". Furthermore, he wanted the fight to "allow the emotionality of Vader to come through in the choices he was making within that confrontation". Towards the end of the duel, Vader ignites some fuel with his lightsaber and burns Kenobi, which was a parallel to their previous duel in Star Wars: Episode III – Revenge of the Sith (2005). Harold had opined that Vader's choice had shown "the character beneath and the torture beneath—the pain inflicted and the eye-for-an-eye of it all. It's a chance to hint at something beneath the mask. Vader can't be talking about, you know, his feelings. So it has to be in action".

=== Casting ===
The episode stars Ewan McGregor as Obi-Wan Kenobi, and features co-stars Vivien Lyra Blair as Princess Leia, Moses Ingram as Reva Sevander / Third Sister, Sung Kang as the Fifth Brother, Rya Kihlstedt as the Fourth Sister, Zach Braff as Freck, Indira Varma as Tala, and Hayden Christensen as Anakin Skywalker / Darth Vader. James Earl Jones and the Respeecher AI-company was credited for the voice of Darth Vader. Dustin Ceithamer portrays the droid NED-B. Also appearing are AJ Troup as Stormtrooper #1, Shane Hartline as Stormtrooper #2, Ardeshir Radpour as the Checkpoint Stormtrooper, Melanie Mosley as Safehouse Stormtrooper #1, and Will Westwater as Safehouse Stormtrooper #2.

=== Design ===
NED-B's hammer was inspired by Jabba the Hutt's skiff in Return of the Jedi (1983). Propmaster Brad Elliott said that it was originally intended to be a power hammer, but changed into a different design as he did not know what that was. He took inspiration from the skiff guard staff and added a power unit and rigid tubing to "suggest that, much like a vibro-axe, it creates extra impact with a power assist".

=== Filming and visual effects ===
Principal photography began on May 4, 2021, on the annual Star Wars Day celebration, with Deborah Chow directing, and Chung-Chung hoon serving as cinematographer. The series had used the StageCraft video wall technology provided by Industrial Light & Magic (ILM). Filming had taken place in The Volume set, the soundstage in which the StageCraft technology is implemented, at the Manhattan Beach Studios. Scenes for Mapuzo were filmed on-location in California. Kenobi's hallucination of Anakin Skywalker, which was the first scene Christensen had filmed, was shot on-location. By that time, McGregor had finished filming his scenes for the day, but had stayed behind to see Christensen.

Visual effects for the episode were created by ILM, Hybride, Image Engine, Important Looking Pirates, Soho VFX, Wētā FX, Blind LTD, and ReDefine. Image Engine delivered VFX for many sequences featuring Mapuzo. The first three shots in the sequence where Kenobi and Leia's ship land on Mapuzo was fully created using computer-generated imagery (CGI). Details such as smoke, dust, heat hazes, and other optical effects were added to the scenes, while the compositing staff used real photography for references to composite the environments. Landscapes for Mapuzo were created with a combination of Lidar, photogrammetry, and hand-sculpted topography. The Houdini program was used to "procedurally lay out the windy plants and Joshua trees". Sequences featuring Freck's transport required removing the vehicle's wheels, adding a CG extension underneath, and recreating the environment around it. Compositing supervisor Freddy Chávez Olmos said that the creative department's work helped facilitate compositing, as they could "extend and blend any blue screens seamlessly". The VFX for the transport scene required using the full backdrop valley from the California filming locations and organizing the shots sequentially as they did not have enough contiguous plate footage, which gave enough material for the scene up to the Imperial checkpoint. Compositing lead Joel Tong modified and regraded plate shots so that the footage from on-location and bluescreen filming had matching lighting conditions.

=== Music ===
Natalie Holt was hired as composer for the series, making her the first woman to score a live-action Star Wars project, while John Williams composed the "Obi-Wan Theme". Holt wanted each planet in the series feel like its own character. Andreas Guteun Aaser, Holt's assistant, used a nose flute while composing the sound for Mapuzo.

== Marketing ==
After the episode, Lucasfilm announced merchandise inspired by the episode as part of its weekly "Obi-Wan Wednesdays" promotion for each episode of the series, including Hasbro figures for Kenobi and Vader, Funko Pops for Haja Estree and Reva, and a lightsaber toy by Hasbro. Additionally, Lucasfilm and Disney revealed posters they had created in a collaboration with artists from Poster Posse for the series.

== Reception ==
=== Audience viewership ===
According to Nielsen Media Research who measures the number of minutes watched by United States audiences on television sets, Obi-Wan Kenobi was the fourth-most watched series from May 30–June 5, with 958 million minutes viewed. It also reported that two-third of the audiences were male, with the age distribution being evenly split across the 18–34, 35–49, and 50–64-year-old groups.

=== Critical response ===
The review aggregator website Rotten Tomatoes reports an 86% approval rating with an average rating of 8/10, based on 28 reviews. The site's critical consensus reads, "Obi-Wan Kenobi still hasn't achieved the epic execution its premise promises, but the return of an iconic villain lends this installment a ghostly gravitas."

Rating the episode 4 stars out of 5, Megan Crouse of Den of Geek highlighted Kenobi and Vader's confrontation and the characterization of the two characters. She felt that Kenobi's character is "shown in actions as much or more so than with words. He's focused on running and hiding, even when confronted with his old-friend-turned-rival", while opining that Vader's character improved throughout the episode. She praised Jones' voice acting, Chow's direction, the interaction of the Inquisitors, and the atmosphere of Mapuzo. However, she criticized some of the visuals in the episode, particularly the lighting of the lightsabers in some shots and the action choreography. At Total Film, Bradley Russell also gave the episode 4 stars out of 5. He heavily lauded the episode's portrayal of Vader, saying the episode gets "everything right" about him, comparing Vader to his appearances in the original trilogy and Rogue One (2016), and noting his harassment of bystanders, saying "He even chokes out innocents while on the hunt for Obi-Wan, offering up a threat as fearsome as any seen in Star Wars media.". He also highlighted Kenobi and Vader's duel, writing "The lightsaber battle was never going to be on the Duel of the Fates level of expertise but, as a character beat, Vader violently slashing and slicing as Obi-Wan struggles to defend himself. It hits just as hard as any intricate battle would", though he did have some misgivings about the duel, feeling that the duel's ending was not as impactful as that of The Empire Strikes Back (1980). Simon Cardy from IGN felt the episode "gives us what we've been waiting for", also highlighting the confrontation between Kenobi and Vader and praising the sequence's choreography, though he expressed some disapproval for action sequences in the first half of the episode. He opined that the episode was more similar to Cormac McCarthy's The Road (2006) rather than The Mandalorian, writing the episode's "more sombre approach to storytelling fits perfectly with where we find both our lead character and the Galaxy, both at their lowest points". Cardy lauded Kenobi's characterization, Holt's score, Chow's direction, and the episode's pacing, saying that it maintains "that balance between a slowly unravelling plot and action, while leaving time for pockets of genuine emotional impact", and rated the episode an 8 out of 10.

Giving the episode an A− grade, Maggie Lovvitt from Collider also highlighted the portrayal of Vader and his duel with Kenobi. Additionally, she also praised Chow's direction, writing "Chow continues to deliver some of the most visually stunning Star Wars stories to date, intricately building on its script with clever directorial choices and building on this somber chapter in Kenobi's life", and felt it properly contextualized A New Hope. For The A.V. Club, Manuel Betancourt gave the episode a C+ grade. He felt that Kenobi and Vader's duel in the episode retconned their future duel in A New Hope, and called the duel a "dreary kind of deja vu", opining that it was too reminiscient to their duels in Revenge of the Sith and A New Hope. He criticized the episode's plot, feeling that it was "stitched together from known Star Wars tropes" and felt the series' narrative focus on Vader and Leia negatively affected the quality of its character study for Kenobi. However, he praised McGregor's performance and his chemistry with Blair. At Vulture, Jesse Hassenger felt the episode elucidates the "structure" of the series. He criticized the writing and plot of the episode, calling the interactions between Kenobi, Leia, and Reva as being a "hopscotch around the galaxy in various pursuits of each other". He did not like Kenobi's repeated attempts to converse with the Force ghost of Qui-Gon Jinn, and said of the writing process that it "seems like it involves the smoothing out of many drafts into something that basically makes enough sense but isn't going to wow anyone with the quiet grace of its storytelling". He also criticized the duel between Vader and Kenobi, writing that "By design, this is not the rematch of the century. In fact, it very much feels like something included at around the series' halfway mark to sate the Vader fanboys", criticizing some of the dialogue in the scene, but praising Chow's direction and use of visuals. Additionally, Hassenger also expressed some approval for the ending.
