= Part I (Obi-Wan Kenobi) =

- Obi-Wan Kenobi episode
- Promotional poster
- Episode no.: Episode 1
- Directed by: Deborah Chow
- Story by: Stuart Beattie; Hossein Amini
- Teleplay by: Joby Harold; Hossein Amini; Stuart Beattie
- Cinematography by: Chung Chung-hoon
- Editing by: Nicolas De Toth
- Original release date: May 27, 2022
- Running time: 52 minutes

Cast
- Ming Qui as Minas Velti; Grant Feely as Luke Skywalker; Leilani Shiu as Teeka; Chad Parker as Padu Cherd; Johnathan Ho and Oliver Ho as Jedi Younglings; Gabe Fonseca as Kayo Organa; Roberta Sparta as Celly Organa; Ian Ningo as Niano Organa; Heath McGough as Groff Ditcher; Molly Miller as Agira; Aviel Ayoung as Mercenary #1; Amy Sturdivant as Mercenary #2; Anthony Daniels as C-3PO

Episode chronology
← Previous —	Next → "Part II"

"Part I" is the first episode of the American streaming television series Obi-Wan Kenobi, based on Star Wars created by George Lucas. It follows Obi-Wan Kenobi in a self-imposed exile on Tatooine a decade after the events of Star Wars: Episode III - Revenge of the Sith (2005) as he monitors Luke Skywalker on Tatooine to ensure his safety. It was written by Stuart Beattie, Hossein Amini, and Joby Harold and directed by Deborah Chow.

The episode stars Ewan McGregor as Obi-Wan Kenobi, who reprises his role from the Star Wars prequel trilogy, alongside co-stars Rupert Friend, Sung Kang, Moses Ingram, Benny Safdie, Joel Edgerton, Bonnie Piesse, Simone Kessell, Vivien Lyra Blair, Flea, with Jimmy Smits. Chow was hired in September 2019, and following rewrites of the script, Harold became the head writer and showrunner. Both executive produce alongside McGregor, Michelle Rejwan, and Kathleen Kennedy, while the episode is produced by Thomas Hayslip and Katterli Frauenfelder.

"Part I" was released on Disney+ on May 27, 2022. It received positive reviews from critics, with praise for McGregor's performance, Chow's direction, the script, and its character-focused storyline.

== Plot ==
Ten years after the enactment of Order 66 and the Galactic Republic's re-organization into the Galactic Empire, (Note: As depicted in the film Star Wars: Episode III – Revenge of the Sith (2005)) former Jedi Master Obi-Wan Kenobi is now a self-exiled recluse on the planet Tatooine under the alias "Ben", where he works at a meat factory and watches over a young Luke Skywalker, despite numerous warnings to stay away from him and his family by Luke's step-uncle Owen Lars. Kenobi also experiences nightmares of his past and has lost connection to the Force as he struggles to contact his deceased former master Qui-Gon Jinn.

The Grand Inquisitor, Fifth Brother, and Third Sister (Reva Sevander) arrive on Tatooine in search of a Jedi named Nari. Once they find Nari, Reva recklessly attempts to kill him, which the Grand Inquisitor prevents, wanting to interrogate Nari instead. Nari manages to escape in the ensuing commotion. The Grand Inquisitor berates Reva on her impulsive actions and her obsession on finding Kenobi, who is widely believed to be dead, and unbeknownst to them on Tatooine. Kenobi leaves a toy for Skywalker on the Lars' homestead. The next day, Owen vehemently returns the toy and rebukes him. Reva and Fifth Brother arrive in the area, and Kenobi hides. Reva harasses Owen and the other citizens in an attempt to find Nari, but Owen feigns ignorance, as he wants to protect his family. That night, Nari attempts to seek help from Kenobi, but he refuses and tells him to hide from the Inquisitors as the Jedi are being hunted. Kenobi then finds his hanging corpse the next day.

Desperate to lure Kenobi, Reva hires bounty hunter Vect Nokru and his gang to kidnap a young Princess Leia Organa, after finding out connections between Kenobi and her adopted father and senator Bail Organa, from Alderaan. Bail requests Kenobi rescue her and travels to Tatooine to personally convince him. Kenobi recovers his lightsaber from the desert and leaves Tatooine.

== Production ==
=== Development ===
By August 2017, Lucasfilm was developing a spin-off film focusing on Ewan McGregor's Obi-Wan Kenobi from the Star Wars prequel trilogy. However, following the project's cancellation due to the financial failure of Solo: A Star Wars Story (2018), McGregor entered negotiations to star in a six-episode Disney+ limited series centered around Kenobi. The series was officially announced by Lucasfilm president Kathleen Kennedy at the 2019 D23 event. Deborah Chow was hired to direct all episodes for the series by September 2019, while Joby Harold became the head writer and showrunner in April 2020 following Kennedy's disapproval with the scripts and subsequent rewrites. The series is executive produced by Harold, Chow, McGregor, Kennedy, and Michelle Rejwan. Chow and Harold wanted the series to be a character study for Kenobi, and worked to connect elements from the prequel trilogy and original trilogy. Harold wanted to further explore Kenobi's character following the events of Order 66 and wanted him to deal with issues from his past. Chow also took inspirations from "gritty, poetic westerns" including The Assassination of Jesse James by the Coward Robert Ford (2007), The Proposition (2005), and the works of Akira Kurosawa.

=== Writing ===
Various story elements in the episode were conceived by Stuart Beattie and Hossein Amini when they were developing the film. The episode takes place a decade after the events of Order 66. McGregor had described Kenobi as a "broken man after what happened with the Jedi order at the end of Star Wars: Episode III – Revenge of the Sith (2005), but also what happened with Anakin; that he lost him to the dark side. He feels an enormous amount of responsibility for that, and guilt". He further noted that "he'd lost his faith ... it was interesting to take him into a darker place and then over the course of the series, see how he finds his faith again and gets back to being the Obi-Wan that we knew and loved". Harold had also noted that Kenobi was traumatized by both his past and the rise of the Empire, adding "Within that hopeless fatalistic world, we find possibly the most famous of all our surviving Jedi in hiding struggling with that faith that defines the Jedi, and wanting to hold onto it and hoping to regain that faith within that sort of hopeless world".

Harold said that the Galactic Empire was in "ascendancy" during this time period, that most of the Jedi Order was killed, and that the Empire has set up the Inquisitor program, which consists of dark side Force users tasked with finding and killing Jedi. They were recruited by Darth Vader, with Chow wanting them to be depicted in a way that "felt true to the spirit of the animated series [Star Wars Rebels (2014-2018)]", where they had originated from. The episode features the Grand Inquisitor, Fifth Brother, and the Third Sister / Reva Sevander, and their introduction in the series was an idea conceived by Dave Filoni. Reva's character was originally conceived by Beattie and Amini.

He chose to include Princess Leia in the episode as he felt that her message to Kenobi in A New Hope (1977) would be "less arbitrary as a choice and a decision now that we know the depth of the history they have together. I liked the fact that it helped reinforce and better articulate a little piece of the jigsaw that is already in place". He also did so as he felt that having her being kidnapped would force Kenobi out of exile because he would equally prioritize Leia and Luke's, explaining that "Bail [Organa] gets to articulate that to Obi-Wan in the cave [in Episode 1]. She's [Obi-Wan's] daughter too. That's a vital piece of canon to explore to me. If anything's gonna take him away from Luke, it had to be her". Harold also felt that "taking him [Kenobi] to new places was really exciting".

=== Design ===
Propmaster Brad Elliott was influenced by resources Pablo Hidalgo brought for the creative team, Ralph McQuarrie's work on the original trilogy, and techniques prop builders used in the original trilogy. He kept some of Kenobi's belongings from previous films, such as his macrobinoculars, holoprojectors, and datapad. He felt it "made sense that Kenobi would take a few items with him to watch over Luke" and explained that he kept the holoprojector in case Bail Organa had contacted him. The macrobinoculars were fabricated from a pair that was originally intended to appear in Star Wars: Episode II – Attack of the Clones (2002). The datapad was originally used by Anakin Skywalker in Attack of the Clones, but he felt "visual guides" indicate that the datapad actually belonged to Kenobi. Creating Kenobi's lightsaber was challenging for the prop builders, as prop designers from the prequel and original trilogies did not use the same hilt designs, requiring the prop team on the series to merge the two iterations together "into something new that still felt authentic". The T-16 skyhopper model, the toy which Kenobi attempts to give Skywalker, was created based on reference photos from the original prop as used in A New Hope, with prop builders utilizing the same model kits used to create the original one.

=== Casting ===
The episode stars Ewan McGregor as Obi-Wan Kenobi, and features recurring co-stars Rupert Friend as the Grand Inquisitor, Sung Kang as the Fifth Brother, Moses Ingram as Reva Sevander / Third Sister, Benny Safdie as Nari, Vivien Lyra Blair as a young Princess Leia, Simone Kessel as Breha Organa, Flea as Vect Nokru. in addition to Joel Edgerton, Bonnie Piesse, and Jimmy Smits reprising their roles as Owen Lars, Beru Whitesun Lars, and Bail Organa, respectively, from the prequel trilogy. Also appearing are Ming Qui as Minas Velti, Grant Feely as Luke Skywalker, and Anthony Daniels as C-3PO.

=== Filming and visual effects ===
Principal photography began on May 4, 2021, on the annual Star Wars Day celebration, with Deborah Chow directing, and Chung-hoon Chung serving as cinematographer. The series had used the StageCraft video wall technology provided by Industrial Light & Magic (ILM). Filming had taken place in The Volume set, the soundstage in which the StageCraft technology is implemented, at the Manhattan Beach Studios.

Visual effects for the episode were created by ILM, Hybride, Image Engine, Important Looking Pirates, Soho VFX, Wētā FX, Blind LTD, and ReDefine.

=== Music ===
Natalie Holt was hired as composer for the series, making her the first woman to score a live-action Star Wars project, while John Williams composed the "Obi-Wan Theme". Holt explained that in the episode, "Obi's in the desert, he's given up everything, he's lost, he's alone. I tried some single instruments but it just didn't feel right. Suddenly John was on board, and his involvement unlocked the use of those heritage themes". She described the process as "finding the right level of 'Star Wars' homage, because we've got heritage characters" and "adding in new elements as well". While writing the score for the series, she wanted to find the "right balance for them [Deborah Chow and Kathleen Kennedy] were looking for in Obi's world" and took inspiration from William's work on Star Wars. Holt wanted each of the planets in the series to feel like their own character. For Alderaan, she added "South American flavors" and used an orchestra and synthesizers for the score. Chow described it as a "really socialist country, green, modern, tech..." and compared the Organa family to the Obamas.

== Marketing ==
Prior to the episode's release, merchandise inspired by the episode as part of the "Obi-Wan Wednesdays" promotion for each episode of the series was revealed, including Funko Pops, Hasbro, Jazwares, Lego sets, and Mattel toys for Reva, Kenobi, and Darth Vader. The first two episodes of the series were shown at an advanced screening at the 2022 Star Wars Celebration alongside a live performance of the series' main theme by the Pacific Symphony orchestra conducted by John Williams. Additionally, Lucasfilm and Disney revealed posters they had created in a collaboration with artists from Poster Posse for the series.

== Reception ==
=== Audience viewership ===
Nielsen Media Research, which measures the number of minutes watched by United States audiences on television sets, had measured that viewers had watched over one billion minutes of its premiere episodes from May 27–29. It was the third Disney+ series to do so, after The Mandalorian and Loki. The episodes received 11.2 million viewers per minute in its opening weekend, and was viewed in 2.14 million US households from May 27–30. Disney had announced that it was the most-watched Disney+ series premiere globally.

=== Critical response ===
The review aggregator website Rotten Tomatoes reports an 87% approval rating with an average rating of 7.50/10, based on 89 reviews. The site's critical consensus reads, "Ewan McGregor returns to the Star Wars fold with a wearier Obi-Wan, but this saga still feels vital in a premiere that cleverly plays on fan expectations."

Giving the episode an A+ grade, Maggie Lovitt of Collider felt the episode was a "strong re-introducing to Obi-Wan Kenobi" and praised its script, though she stated that "the fun really begins in the later-released 'Part II'". Bradley Russell from Total Film gave the series 4 and a half out of 5 stars. He praised Chow's direction, John William's score, and the cast performances, particularly that of McGregor, Blair, and Ingram. He felt that McGregor "takes every opportunity to flash Obi-Wan's internal pain all over his face" and called it "one of Star Wars' great performances already", and called the episode a "near-perfect opening to a lost chapter in Obi-Wan's history", though he expressed disappointment of Friends' role as the Grand Inquisitor. At Vulture, Jesse Hassenger rated the episode 3 stars out of 5, praising Chow's direction and visuals. He also praised the pacing and McGregor's performance and the amount of screen-time Kenobi has in the episode, writing it "excels when it accumulates silent details and small interactions from his lonely routine". He opined that the episode served as both a character study and a "call to action", but felt it did not reach the "hero-in-spartan-exile gold standard of, say, James Mangold's The Wolverine", criticizing some of the dialogue and scenes with Bail Organa and Owen Lars, which he felt "becomes clunkier and less expressive".

BBC Culture's Stephen Kelly praised Harold's script, opining that it was "remarkable in the first episode for its tightness, with not a single scene feeling superfluous or wasted". He also praised McGregor's performance and Kenobi's characterization, calling it "a compelling portrait of defeat and regret, bolstered by a sad, soulful performance from McGregor, who has managed to dim the twinkle from Obi-Wan's eyes". He also praised its production values, though he did say it was "unmistakably televisual", writing "scenes on Tatooine ... have a strange, artificial quality to them unbefitting of Obi-Wan's grand status. Doesn't he deserve a bigger stage?", and gave the first two episodes four out of five stars. Matt Purslow of IGN praised the overall story and felt Kenobi's mission to save Leia showed character growth. He also highlighted McGregor's performance and gave the episodes an 8 out of 10, calling it "the most well-balanced Star Wars story for quite some time". Writing for The Verge, Andrew Webster also lauded McGregor's performance and called the Inquisitors "suitably menacing". He added that his favorite part was "how lived-in the universe feels, much like classic Star Wars" and called the show a "refreshingly old-school Star Wars story", though he felt that some plot elements "didn't make sense".
