= Part VI (Obi-Wan Kenobi) =

- Obi-Wan Kenobi episode
- Promotional poster
- Episode no.: Episode 6
- Directed by: Deborah Chow
- Story by: Joby Harold; Andrew Stanton; Stuart Beattie
- Teleplay by: Joby Harold; Andrew Stanton; Hossein Amini
- Cinematography by: Chung Chung-hoon
- Original release date: June 22, 2022
- Running time: 51 minutes

Cast
- Hossein Mardani as Dardin Shull; Johnathan Ho and Oliver Ho as Jedi Younglings; Heath McGough as Groff Ditcher; Indie Desroches as Corran; Crispian Belfrage as Devastator Captain; Grant Feely as Luke Skywalker; Liam Neeson as Qui-Gon Jinn; Ian McDiarmid as Emperor Palpatine/Darth Sidious

Episode chronology
← Previous "Part V"	Next → —

"Part VI" is the sixth episode and series finale of the American streaming television series Obi-Wan Kenobi. It follows Obi-Wan Kenobi. It is set in the Star Wars universe, occurring ten years after the film Revenge of the Sith (2005). The episode was written by Joby Harold, Andrew Stanton, Hossein Amini, and Stuart Beattie, and directed by Deborah Chow.

The episode stars Ewan McGregor as Obi-Wan Kenobi, who reprises his role from the Star Wars prequel trilogy, alongside co-stars Indira Varma, Vivien Lyra Blair, Moses Ingram, O'Shea Jackson Jr., Maya Erskine, Sung Kang, Rya Kihlstedt, and Hayden Christensen. Chow was hired in September 2019, and following rewrites of the script, Harold became the head writer and showrunner. Both executive produce alongside McGregor, Michelle Rejwan, and Kathleen Kennedy, while the episode is produced by Thomas Hayslip and Katterli Frauenfelder.

"Part VI" was released on the streaming service Disney+ on June 22, 2022. It received praise towards the rematch of Kenobi and Darth Vader, action sequences, visuals, cinematography, Kenobi and Reva's character development, performances (particularly of Christensen and McGregor), and the emotional weight, but received some criticism for its writing.

== Plot ==
Reva arrives on Tatooine to find Luke Skywalker, while Darth Vader and the Empire pursue the Path network. Obi-Wan Kenobi eventually decides to confront Vader alone on a nearby planet while the Path safely escapes.

A lengthy lightsaber duel occurs between Kenobi and Vader, where while Obi-Wan is able to hold his own, he is overwhelmed and buried under rubble by Vader. While holding the rubble barely at bay with the Force, Kenobi eventually regains his full connection to it, throws off the rubble, and resumes the battle with Vader. Kenobi incapacitates Vader and slices off part of his mask, revealing Vader's original identity of Anakin Skywalker. Kenobi apologizes to Vader. Vader retorts by saying that he killed Anakin himself, and that it wasn't Kenobi's fault. Realizing Anakin has completely embraced his identity as Darth Vader, a saddened Kenobi leaves.

After arriving at Luke's home, Reva is confronted by Owen and Beru Lars. She subdues them and pursues Luke into the desert. After remembering Anakin's massacre of the Jedi Temple, she decides to return Luke to his family. Kenobi congratulates her for overcoming her trauma and liberating herself from the Dark Side.

On Mustafar, a healed Vader abandons his search for Kenobi after his master, Emperor Palpatine, questions his motives and loyalty. Back on Alderaan, Leia Organa finds new resolve in her duties as a princess. Kenobi visits them and affirms that he will help the Organas when needed.

Returning to Tatooine, he resolves his conflict with Owen by agreeing to let Luke have a normal life; Owen allows him to greet Luke. Having found inner peace, Obi-Wan is finally able to converse with the Force spirit of Qui-Gon Jinn.

== Production ==
=== Development ===
By August 2017, Lucasfilm was developing a spin-off film focusing Ewan McGregor's Obi-Wan Kenobi from the Star Wars prequel trilogy. However, following the project's cancellation due to the financial failure of Solo: A Star Wars Story (2018), McGregor entered negotiations to star in a six-episode Disney+ limited series centered around Kenobi. The series was officially announced by Lucasfilm president Kathleen Kennedy at the 2019 D23 event. Deborah Chow was hired to direct all episodes for the series by September 2019, while Joby Harold became the head writer and showrunner in April 2020 following Kennedy's disapproval with the scripts and subsequent rewrites. The series is executive produced by Harold, Chow, McGregor, Kennedy, and Michelle Rejwan. Chow and Harold wanted the series to be a character study for Kenobi, and worked to connect elements from the prequel trilogy and original trilogy. Harold wanted to further explore Kenobi's character following the events of Order 66 and wanted him to deal with issues from his past. Chow also took inspirations from "gritty, poetic westerns" including The Assassination of Jesse James by the Coward Robert Ford (2007), The Proposition (2005), and the works of Akira Kurosawa.

=== Writing ===
By November 2021, concept art was released featuring a duel between Darth Vader and Obi-Wan Kenobi, originally described by Kathleen Kennedy as the "rematch of the century", a claim later reiterated by Hayden Christensen who also confirmed an additional duel would occur in the final episode. Chow had felt it was imperative that the episode would "thread a needle" as they wanted the character arcs to align with that of A New Hope (1977) and ensure that the plot had adhered to canon. She had also wanted to ensure that the action scenes had not overshadowed the narrative elements. She had later identified the final scene, in which Kenobi converses with Qui-Gon Jinn's Force ghost, as being her favorite scene in the episode, and "Part VI" being her favorite episode overall in the series. Christensen recognized the importance of the rematch between Darth Vader and Kenobi. To prepare for the scene, Christensen had rewatched the Star Wars Rebels (2014–2018) episode "Twilight of the Apprentice", in which Vader and Ahsoka Tano fight, which also cracks a part of his mask.

=== Casting ===
The episode stars Ewan McGregor as Obi-Wan Kenobi, and features co-stars Indira Varma as Tala Durith, Vivien Lyra Blair as Princess Leia, Moses Ingram as Reva Sevander / Third Sister, O'Shea Jackson Jr. as Roken, Maya Erskine as Sully, Sung Kang as the Fifth Brother, Rya Kihlstedt as the Fourth Sister, and Hayden Christensen as Anakin Skywalker / Darth Vader. James Earl Jones also provides the voice for Darth Vader.

=== Filming and visual effects ===
Principal photography began on May 4, 2021, on the annual Star Wars Day celebration, with Deborah Chow directing, and Chung-hoon Chung serving as cinematographer. The series had used the StageCraft video wall technology provided by Industrial Light & Magic (ILM). Filming had taken place in The Volume set, the soundstage in which the StageCraft technology is implemented, at the Manhattan Beach Studios. Christensen said that filming the duel between Darth Vader and Kenobi was "emotional", opining that he thought their emotions "comes across onscreen". McGregor had filmed the final scenes of the episode with a practical camel, while Neeson had cried with McGregor when rehearsing their scene together.

Visual effects for the episode were created by ILM, Hybride, Image Engine, Important Looking Pirates, Soho VFX, Wētā FX, Blind LTD, and ReDefine.

=== Music ===
Natalie Holt was hired as composer for the series, making her the first woman to score a live-action Star Wars project, while John Williams composed the "Obi-Wan Theme".

== Marketing ==
After the episode, Lucasfilm announced merchandise inspired by the episode as part of its weekly "Obi-Wan Wednesdays" promotion for each episode of the series, including different figures of Funko Pop for Kenobi, Vader, Reva, Tala and Roken, a Purge Trooper Statue by Gentle Giant LTD, a NED-B toy by Hasbro, a T-Shirt by Mad Engine, and a PopGrip by PopSockets. Additionally, Lucasfilm and Disney revealed posters they had created in a collaboration with artists from Poster Posse for the series.

== Reception ==
The review aggregator website Rotten Tomatoes reports a 74% approval rating with an average rating of 7.80/10, based on 34 reviews. The site's critical consensus reads, "If Obi-Wan Kenobi never quite fulfilled its lofty promise, it thankfully sticks the landing with an action-packed finale that's fittingly full of hope."

Simon Cardy from IGN rated the episode a 9 out of 10, remarking the series "saved the best until last". He lauded McGregor's performance, highlighting the scene between Kenobi and Princess Leia. Commenting on Darth Vader and Kenobi's duel, Cardy thought it to be their best duel so far, feeling the set design, choreography, and Holt's music had complemented the scene well. However, he expressed minor complaints with how the editing had distracted from Vader and Kenobi's duel with Reva's pursuit for Luke Skywalker, desiring the series to focus more on the latter. Grading the episode an A+, Maggie Lovitt from Collider felt that Chow and Harold's direction and writing had concluded the narrative threads well. She also cited the scenes Kenobi has between Leia and Luke as being good ones, and felt Reva's decision to not kill Luke had provided her with a nice story, albeit being "far from complete". Lovvitt also praised McGregor and Christensen's performances, saying they were able to "breathe new life into the characters with the backing of Harold's strong storytelling and Chow's keen ability to deliver visually stunning and dynamic scene work". In a 4.5 star out of 5 review, Bradley Russell's review for Total Film summarized the episode as being "a rousing concluding episode, one packed with an abundance of fan service, well-earned emotional interactions, and a lightsaber battle that will live long in the memory". Russell opined that the final duel between Vader and Kenobi was worth the wait, deeply enjoying the choreography and its emotional weight, and felt its quality to be augmented by Chow's direction. However, he felt that the episode also contained elements of fan service, with Emperor Palpatine's cameo, Kenobi saying "Hello there" to Luke, and Qui-Gonn Jinn's cameo, the latter of which he enjoyed.

Megan Crouse's review for Den of Geek rated the episode 3 out of 5 stars. She felt that the episode was "repetitive and contrived", opining that the episode didn't effectively conclude its narrative as it was trying to connect to other elements of the Star Wars franchise and indulged in too much fan service. However, she enjoyed that Reva's redemption, deeming it to be a subversion from "the same old trope where the hero steps in to save the villain", cited McGregor's performance as being an improvement to the prequel trilogy, and found Kenobi and Vader's duel to contain dramatic moments. With a C+ grade, Manuel Betancourt for The A.V. Club noted that many narrative elements would remain the same, including certain characters surviving and Luke and Leia not being aware of their parentage. He also conceded to enjoying Kenobi and Vader's duel, like Crouse, but did not enjoy Reva's characterization in the episode. He summarized the episode as being a "rerun of Star Wars hits" and felt the series did not justify its existence. Writing for Screen Rant, Graeme Guttmann also agreed with Betancourt's sentiment that the series did not justify its existence, enjoying the duel between Kenobi and Vader but also feeling that something was missing, and did not enjoy how the overall series had handled dealing with issues regarding Kenobi's character and how its narrative had led up to their collective duel. Contrary to some other reviewers, he felt that Reva's pursuit of Luke was more exciting than the duel as he had enjoyed her mysterious characterization.
