= Part II (Obi-Wan Kenobi) =

- Obi-Wan Kenobi episode
- Promotional poster
- Episode no.: Episode 2
- Directed by: Deborah Chow
- Story by: Stuart Beattie; Hossein Amini
- Teleplay by: Joby Harold
- Cinematography by: Chung Chung-hoon
- Editing by: Kelley Dixon
- Original release date: May 27, 2022
- Running time: 38 minutes

Cast
- Temuera Morrison as Veteran Clone Trooper; Dan Considine as Densin Clord; Jecobi Swain as Jayco; Indie Desroches as Corran; Esther Rose McGregor as Tetha Grig; Aviel Ayoung as Mercenary #1; Amy Sturdivant as Mercenary #2

Episode chronology
← Previous "Part I"	Next → "Part III"

"Part II" is the second episode of the American streaming television series Obi-Wan Kenobi, based on Star Wars created by George Lucas. It follows Obi-Wan Kenobi as he attempts to rescue Leia Organa on the planet Daiyu. The episode is set in the Star Wars universe, occurring ten years after the film Star Wars: Episode III – Revenge of the Sith (2005). Its story was written by Stuart Beattie and Hossein Amini, and the teleplay was written by Joby Harold, while Deborah Chow directed the episode.

The episode stars Ewan McGregor as Obi-Wan Kenobi, who reprises his role from the Star Wars prequel trilogy, alongside co-stars Kumail Nanjiani, Márise Álvarez, Flea, Moses Ingram, Vivien Lyra Blair, Rupert Friend, Sung Kang, Rya Kihlstedt, and Hayden Christensen. Chow was hired to direct in 2019, and following rewrites of the script, Harold became the head writer and showrunner. Both executive produce alongside McGregor, Michelle Rejwan, and Kathleen Kennedy, while the episode is produced by Thomas Hayslip and Katterli Frauenfelder.

"Part II" was released on Disney+ on May 27, 2022. It received generally positive reviews from critics, who praised the visual aesthetic of Daiyu, action sequences, and the performances (particularly that of McGregor, Blair, and Nanjiani), though some plot elements received minor criticisms.

== Plot ==
After tracking the kidnappers to the planet Daiyu, Obi-Wan Kenobi encounters con man Haja Estree, who pretends to be a Jedi. Haja directs Kenobi to Princess Leia's location, where he defeats the kidnappers and rescues her. The Grand Inquisitor learns of their presence and locks the city down. Reva disobeys orders to stand down and places a new bounty on Kenobi, causing mercenaries around the city to target him and Leia. When Leia realizes they are after Kenobi, she loses trust in him and runs away; he follows her onto a roof. With mercenaries attempting to kill them, Leia jumps off a roof, trying to reach another building, but falls. Kenobi saves her using the Force, gaining her trust. Haja finds them and directs them to an unguarded cargo port from which they can escape, but cannot stop Reva from following them. Reva reveals to Kenobi that Anakin Skywalker, now known as Darth Vader, is still alive, which shocks him; he presumed Anakin had died ten years ago. The Grand Inquisitor kills bounty hunter Vect Nokru for his earlier failure to keep Leia captive, then tracks down Kenobi to arrest him himself. Reva stabs the Inquisitor with her lightsaber, inadvertently allowing Kenobi and Leia to escape. Elsewhere, Darth Vader awakens in a bacta tank.

== Production ==
=== Development ===
By August 2017, Lucasfilm was developing a spin-off film focusing Ewan McGregor's Obi-Wan Kenobi from the Star Wars prequel trilogy. However, following the project's cancellation due to the financial failure of Solo: A Star Wars Story (2018), McGregor entered negotiations to star in a six-episode Disney+ limited series centered around Kenobi. The series was officially announced by Lucasfilm president Kathleen Kennedy at the 2019 D23 event. Deborah Chow was hired to direct all episodes for the series by September 2019, while Joby Harold became the head writer and showrunner in April 2020 following Kennedy's disapproval with the scripts and subsequent rewrites. The series is executive produced by Harold, Chow, McGregor, Kennedy, and Michelle Rejwan. Chow and Harold wanted the series to be a character study for Kenobi, and worked to connect elements from the prequel trilogy and original trilogy. Harold wanted to further explore Kenobi's character following the events of Order 66 and wanted him to deal with issues from his past. Chow also took inspirations from "gritty, poetic westerns" including The Assassination of Jesse James by the Coward Robert Ford (2007), The Proposition (2005), and the works of Akira Kurosawa.

=== Writing ===
Various story elements in the episode were conceived by Stuart Beattie and Hossein Amini when they were developing the film. A new planet, Daiyu, is introduced in the episode. Chow had felt that it had a "grittiness and energy to it, but that is sort of weird and a bit shady", while Harold described it as having "a graffiti-ridden nightlife" and being "kind of edgy. It's just got a different lane and a different feeling". He also added that its visual aesthetic was inspired by Hong Kong. Harold had originally conceived that the series would take place across multiple planets, as he had felt it was a core element of Star Wars. He chose to include Haja Estree as he felt that Kenobi needed an informant while on Daiyu. He said, "I needed somebody that Obi-Wan can get information out of, but that's very boring if it's just somebody beating up in an alley", and chose to create Haja as a con-man who pretends to be a Jedi.

He was inspired by films such as Paper Moon (1973) and Midnight Run (1988) when writing Princess Leia and Kenobi's scenes together. The episode features Kenobi using the Force for the first time since his self-exile on Tatooine. Harold stated that Kenobi did not use the Force or his lightsaber prior to this as it would draw attention to himself. He further elaborated that "He's habitually gotten to the place where that's in his past for now. So we deliberately didn't see him use it effectively until that moment, because it should be a moment. He shouldn't just grab his cup of coffee in the morning. And he would only do it for something that's important as that. That needed to be the first step. He has to wrap his arms around who he is. And it's a great metaphor for who he is, his relationship to the Force, and his ability to use it". Meanwhile, Temuera Morrison described his appearance as a homeless clone trooper as "representing all that clone army that are no longer around anymore".

While writing the script, Harold adhered to Star Wars canon and consulted with Pablo Hidalgo on whether or not Kenobi knew Darth Vader's identity, saying "it all comes down to, is it viable within canon to play that card? Which it was. Which is great, because that allows you, at the end of Episode 2 and the beginning of Episode 3, it gets you so much that feels essential to the fundamental story, which is Obi Wan, Vader, that which haunts you, facing the past". He chose to include the scene where Kenobi learns that Darth Vader is alive at the end of the episode as he wanted to "slow everything down, really be patient and really build who Obi-Wan was" and then "introduce the notion that he's out there, to then play it, and then end on him saying, 'Anakin.' That word is very seismic to him by then in the audience's minds, because they sat with him for those two episodes", opting to focus on McGregor's performance in the scene as he felt it "makes the storytelling very active for the audience because they get to see it being played out on Ewan's face".

=== Casting ===
The episode stars Ewan McGregor as Obi-Wan Kenobi, and features co-stars Kumail Nanjiani as Haja Estree, Márise Álvarez as Nyche Horn, Flea as Vect Nokru, Moses Ingram as Reva Sevander / Third Sister, Vivien Lyra Blair as Princess Leia, Rupert Friend as the Grand Inquisitor, Sung Kang as the Fifth Brother, Rya Kihlstedt as the Fourth Sister, and Hayden Christensen as Anakin Skywalker / Darth Vader. Also appearing are Temuera Morrison as a veteran clone trooper and Esther McGregor as Tetha Grig.

=== Design ===
Production designer Doug Chiang and Chow incorporated aesthetics from Asian art and culture when designing Daiyu. Chow had used pictures of various brocaded Asian fabrics for reference, with Chiang describing it as "this really rich jade green mixed with very wonderful maroon red. And the combination of those two color palettes, along with the texture [of the fabric], created an interesting visual identity". A drug lab was also included on the planet, as Harold felt Daiyu represented the "underbelly within the Star Wars world" and felt including realistic elements would make the series "a little more tangible for the audience". They chose to design it as a methane lab as they felt it had matched the tone of the series and other designs would be more expensive.

The episode depicts Kenobi using the fictional wupiupi currency. Propmaster Brad Elliott had consulted with Hidalgo while designing the currency. He used an image from Star Wars: Episode I – The Phantom Menace (1999) and the Turkish Yuzluk, a coin currency used during the Ottoman Empire as references. It was originally depicted in The Phantom Menace, while the Yuzluk was a source of inspiration for the original design. The prop team had decreased the size of the wupiupi, while keeping its original art, as Chow was worried about its size due to the "swift hand-to-hand transactions" depicted.

=== Filming ===
Principal photography began on May 4, 2021, on the annual Star Wars Day celebration, with Deborah Chow directing, and Chung-hoon Chung serving as cinematographer. The series had used the StageCraft video wall technology provided by Industrial Light & Magic (ILM). Filming had taken place in The Volume set, the soundstage in which the StageCraft technology is implemented, at the Manhattan Beach Studios. Morrison had filmed his scene for the episode while shooting The Book of Boba Fett (2021-2022), as the two series' production locations were next to each other, making his appearance possible.

Visual effects for the episode were created by ILM, Hybride, Image Engine, Important Looking Pirates, Soho VFX, Wētā FX, Blind LTD, and ReDefine.

=== Music ===
Natalie Holt was hired as composer for the series, making her the first woman to score a live-action Star Wars project, while John Williams composed the "Obi-Wan Theme". Holt sought to make each planet in the series feel like its own character. She described Daiyu as being "more like those Asian night markets with sounds like Indonesian gamelan and dulcimer as well, which you wouldn't usually hear together" and composed the score for Daiyu using a 5/4 rhythm. She chose the rhythm as she thought it "feels like it never quite lands", which symbolized Kenobi's presence in the planet, saying it "felt like it was drawing Obi into Daiyu and into the mystery of the planet and he can't find his feet there".

== Marketing ==
Prior to the episode's release, merchandise inspired by the episode as part of the "Obi-Wan Wednesdays" promotion for each episode of the series was revealed, including Funko Pops, Hasbro, Jazwares, Lego sets, and Mattel toys for Reva, Kenobi, and Darth Vader. The first two episodes of the series were shown at an advanced screening at the 2022 Star Wars Celebration alongside a live performance of the series' main theme by the Pacific Symphony orchestra conducted by John Williams. Additionally, Lucasfilm and Disney revealed posters they had created in a collaboration with artists from Poster Posse for the series.

== Reception ==
=== Audience viewership ===
Nielsen Media Research, which measures the number of minutes watched by United States audiences on television sets, had measured that viewers had watched over one billion minutes of the episodes in May 27–29. It was the third Disney+ series to do so, after The Mandalorian and Loki. The episode received 11.2 million viewers per minute in its opening weekend, and was viewed in 2.14 million US households from May 27–30. Disney had announced that it was the most-watched Disney+ series premiere globally.

=== Critical response ===
The review aggregator website Rotten Tomatoes reports an 89% approval rating with an average rating of 7.60/10, based on 88 reviews. The site's critical consensus reads, "Obi-Wan Kenobi steps up the pace by thrusting the reluctant hero into a fairly exciting rescue mission in an urban underbelly that is oh so uncivilized."

From Total Film, Bradley Russell gave the episode 4 out of 5 stars. While he felt it was inferior to the first episode, he praised Nanjiani's performance, McGregor and Blair's chemistry, and the overall visual aesthetic of Daiyu, feeling that it was inspired by Blade Runner (1982). However, he expressed some criticism with the scene when Leia runs away from Kenobi, saying it "is contrived; you can almost feel the writers contorting themselves into pretzel-shaped knots trying to figure out an organic way for the duo to be separated as the Inquisitors close in". At Collider, Maggie Lovvit gave the episode an A+ grade, praising Blair's performance, writing she "embodies the sassy, headstrong, and determined Princess Leia we have come to know and love from the late and great Carrie Fisher". She also highlighted Chow's direction and felt that Kenobi's "adventure" on Daiyu was "reminiscent of the misadventures he and Anakin once got up to on Coruscant". Both Stuart Heritage from The Guardian and Stephen Kelly from BBC Culture compared the series to John Wick. Heritage, who gave the first two episodes 3 out of 5 stars, praised the episode's action sequences, while Kelly enjoyed Kenobi and Leia's dynamic in the episode, though he felt that Harold's script for the episode was inferior to that of the first.

Vulture's Jesse Hassenger, giving the episode a 4 out of 5 rating, also praised the visuals of Daiyu, but felt that it was "hampered by the limitations of the Star Wars series' signature StageCraft virtual effects". He was mixed toward the character of Haja Estree, opining that while Nanjiani's performance "is both amusing and a reminder that these new Star Wars shows are written by pro screenwriters", he felt that Haja's dialogue with Leia was too reminiscient of Lucas's in the original Star Wars films, which he did not like. He also was neutral towards Reva's character, saying she was "less than fully formed and still sounding decidedly unthreatening when she yells threats". He also opined that Kenobi's relationship with Leia was too similar to that of Din Djarin and Grogu's in The Mandalorian. Ben Lindbergh of The Ringer called the episode a "merciful change of setting, but also an improvement in pace [from the first episode]". He likened Kenobi's character in the episode as being more similar to the "detective Obi-Wan of Episode II" rather than the "reclusive Obi-Wan of Episode IV". He also praised Nanjiani's performance, and called Haja "one of the cleverest characters created for a Disney Star Wars series to date", and Blair's performance. Highlighting the ending of the episode, he felt it was "the moment we were waiting for, the one where Obi-Wan learns that his nightmares can extend to his waking life too", and lauded McGregor's performance in the final scene of the episode.
