= Part V (Obi-Wan Kenobi) =

- Obi-Wan Kenobi episode
- Episode no.: Episode 5
- Directed by: Deborah Chow
- Written by: Joby Harold; Andrew Stanton
- Cinematography by: Chung Chung-hoon
- Original release date: June 15, 2022
- Running time: 43 minutes

Cast
- Crispian Belfrage as Devastator Captain; Johnathan Ho and Oliver Ho as Jedi Younglings; Indie Desroches as Corran; Grant Feely as Luke Skywalker

Episode chronology
← Previous "Part IV"	Next → "Part VI"

"Part V" is the fifth episode of the American streaming television series Obi-Wan Kenobi. It is set in the Star Wars universe, occurring ten years after the film Revenge of the Sith (2005). The episode was written by Joby Harold & Andrew Stanton, and directed by Deborah Chow.

The episode stars Ewan McGregor as Obi-Wan Kenobi, who reprises his role from the Star Wars prequel trilogy, alongside co-stars Indira Varma, Vivien Lyra Blair, Moses Ingram, and Hayden Christensen. Chow was hired in September 2019, and following rewrites of the script, Harold became the head writer and showrunner. Both executive produce alongside McGregor, Michelle Rejwan, and Kathleen Kennedy, while the episode is produced by Thomas Hayslip and Katterli Frauenfelder.

"Part V" was released on the streaming service Disney+ on June 15, 2022. It received positive reviews from critics, with praise towards the action sequences and characterization within them, the flashbacks of Kenobi and Anakin Skywalker, and emotional weight, receiving minor criticisms for its plotting, being deemed predictable, and set design.

== Plot ==
During the time of Attack of the Clones, Obi-Wan Kenobi trains Anakin Skywalker in lightsaber combat on Coruscant, where Kenobi tries to teach Anakin about being blinded by seeking victory. Tracking the Path's location on Jabiim, Darth Vader promotes Reva to Grand Inquisitor. The Empire arrives to siege the facility, and deactivates the escape doors. To stall for time, Kenobi negotiates with Reva and deduces that she knows Vader's true identity as she witnessed his massacre at the Jedi Temple on Coruscant as a Youngling. She reveals she wanted to gain Vader's favor in order to kill Vader for revenge, rather than serve him. The facility is then breached, with Tala sacrificing herself to save Kenobi. Realizing they cannot win, Kenobi surrenders and is taken to Reva. There, he convinces Reva to kill Vader when she delivers Kenobi to him. Meanwhile, Leia opens the doors after removing Lola's tracker, allowing the Path to escape before Vader sieges the facility. Reva uses this opportunity to attempt to kill Vader, but is quickly overpowered after a brief duel and stabbed. Left for dead, the original Grand Inquisitor, revealed to be alive, arrives and reaffirms his status. As the Path network escapes, Reva finds Bail Organa's message on Kenobi's transmitter, revealing Luke's location on Tatooine.

== Production ==
=== Development ===
By August 2017, Lucasfilm was developing a spin-off film focusing Ewan McGregor's Obi-Wan Kenobi from the Star Wars prequel trilogy. However, following the project's cancellation due to the financial failure of Solo: A Star Wars Story (2018), McGregor entered negotiations to star in a six-episode Disney+ limited series centered around Kenobi. The series was officially announced by Lucasfilm president Kathleen Kennedy at the 2019 D23 event. Deborah Chow was hired to direct all episodes for the series by September 2019, while Joby Harold became the head writer and showrunner in April 2020 following Kennedy's disapproval with the scripts and subsequent rewrites. The series is executive produced by Harold, Chow, McGregor, Kennedy, and Michelle Rejwan. Chow and Harold wanted the series to be a character study for Kenobi, and worked to connect elements from the prequel trilogy and original trilogy. Harold wanted to further explore Kenobi's character following the events of Order 66 and wanted him to deal with issues from his past. Chow also took inspirations from "gritty, poetic westerns" including The Assassination of Jesse James by the Coward Robert Ford (2007), The Proposition (2005), and the works of Akira Kurosawa.

=== Writing ===
The episode includes flashbacks featuring Obi-Wan Kenobi training Anakin Skywalker prior to the events of Star Wars: Episode II - Attack of the Clones (2002). Stanton felt that the adherence to canon ultimately "sometimes really handicap what I think are better narrative options", and felt frustrated by the requirements of being faithful to the lore, while noting that other shows, such as Andor (2022-2025) was not as restricted by canon.

=== Casting ===
The episode stars Ewan McGregor as Obi-Wan Kenobi, and features co-stars Indira Varma as Tala Durith, Vivien Lyra Blair as Princess Leia, Moses Ingram as Reva Sevander / Third Sister, and Hayden Christensen as Anakin Skywalker / Darth Vader. James Earl Jones also provides the voice for Darth Vader. Also appearing are Johnathan Ho and Oliver Ho as Jedi Younglings.

=== Filming and visual effects ===
Principal photography began on May 4, 2021, on the annual Star Wars Day celebration, with Deborah Chow directing, and Chung-hoon Chung serving as cinematographer. The series had used the StageCraft video wall technology provided by Industrial Light & Magic (ILM). Filming had taken place in The Volume set, the soundstage in which the StageCraft technology is implemented, at the Manhattan Beach Studios. During the flashback scene, in which Kenobi and Skywalker practice their lightsaber combat, McGregor and Christensen had filmed the scene practically without stunt doubles. McGregor had relied upon his lightsaber training from Star Wars: Episode I – The Phantom Menace (1999) while filming the scene, and Christensen had also enjoyed it, saying it was "like time travel getting to do that flashback sequence".

Visual effects for the episode were created by ILM, Hybride, Image Engine, Important Looking Pirates, Soho VFX, Wētā FX, Blind LTD, and ReDefine. When creating Jabiim, the VFX team took inspiration by using references from planets in other Star Wars films and artwork provided by Lucasfilm. Afterwards, the team would insert clouds and a lighting setup, with matte painting being used to ensure that the shots matched the Lucasfilm artwork. The scene of Reva's assault on the Path facility begins with Reva using her lightsaber to cut through the blast door, which was influenced from Qui-Gon Jinn's scene of cutting through a blast door to reach the Trade Federation Viceroy in The Phantom Menace. The scene was first practically filmed with Ingram using a practical light stick that projected the proper lighting along with practical smoke and spark effects, with post-production augmentations including more smoke, sparks, heat haze, and the impression of melting metals. Composition was also required in order to "sell the energy and physicality of the cut, even though it occurs over just a few frames", with many "visual recipes" being tested to complement the look of the lightsaber and being applied to other scenes later on. Subsequent scenes of Kenobi resisting the Imperial stormtrooper assault featured him in the foreground, which was a deliberate cinematography choice to highlight the "one-man-against-many standoff". A similar procedure was used to visually augment the scenes in post, with the VFX team using references of lightsabers across Star Wars media. Furthermore, the team also had relative ease in executing the blaster shots, as they had prior experience in creating such effects with the studio's work on The Mandalorian (2019–present) and The Book of Boba Fett (2021). The team had identified choreography as the main priority, which included connecting the blaster shots and impacts with corresponding lightsaber movements. Additional components, such as smoke, sparks, and detonations upon impact, were also added in post, while some of the components were provided from props used in practical filming. The production company Lola Visual Effects had also worked on the episode, with the team also including three interns and an alumni from the University of Nebraska–Lincoln (NU). The alumni, Trent Claus, had used his personal connections in order to hire the interns from NU's Johnny Carson Center for Emerging Media Arts. They had worked on the flashback sequence featuring Kenobi and Skywalker's lightsaber fight, also working on various visual effect components such as weapon contact, sparks, flares, and adjusting the surrounding environment to fit in with the movements. Additionally, they had also collaborated with another VFX firm studio when performing minor de-aging on McGregor and Christensen's scenes.

=== Music ===
Natalie Holt was hired as composer for the series, making her the first woman to score a live-action Star Wars project, while John Williams composed the "Obi-Wan Theme".

== Marketing ==
After the episode, Lucasfilm announced merchandise inspired by the episode as part of its weekly "Obi-Wan Wednesdays" promotion for each episode of the series, including different figures of Funko Pop for Roken and Darth Vader, a series of Hasbro figures for the Purge Troopers, 1-JAC, Vader and a mini version of Sully Stark in his T-47 Airspeeder. Additionally, Lucasfilm and Disney revealed posters they had created in a collaboration with artists from Poster Posse for the series.

== Reception ==
=== Critical response ===
The review aggregator website Rotten Tomatoes reports an 81% approval rating with an average rating of 7.9/10, based on 21 reviews. The site's critical consensus reads, "The Third Sister takes center stage and Obi-Wan Kenobi regains the high ground in an action-packed installment that achieves some of the epic heft befitting a Star Wars saga."

Giving the episode an A+ grade, Maggie Lovvit of Collider enjoyed the flashback scene, feeling that it characterized Anakin Skywalker's character well and it had helped developed the plot, further lauding Harold's writing and Chow's direction. She also observed parallels between Darth Vader and Reva's duel and the flashback sequence. Calling it the best episode in series up until then in a 4.5 out of 5 stars rating, Bradley Russell's review of Total Film began by concurring with Lovvit that the flashback sequence did a good job in characterizing Skywalker. However, Russell labelled Tala's death as being "overt emotional manipulation" and later also praised Vader and Reva's duel, enjoying the storytelling by writing "it's deftly handled, with several significant character beats being communicated through their movements alone". Providing a 7 out of 10, Simon Cardy at IGN interpreted the episode as paying homage to Star Wars: The Last Jedi (2017), but criticized the production design of Jabiim. Cardy felt the episode had developed Reva's relationships between Kenobi and Vader well, while positing the episode to center around Reva's character. He later commented the fighting choreography to be done "creatively" but felt the cinematography and staging of it could've been improved upon.

Meanwhile, Jesse Hassenger from Vulture opined that the de-aging effects in the flashback scene were an improvement to Luke Skywalker's appearance in The Mandalorian, but lamented Christensen's limited screentime in the series and found Reva's intention to kill Darth Vader to be illogical considering the fact that she had previously killed Jedi. He also disliked how the story had progressed into the cliffhanger ending, but enjoyed the characterization more than the prior episode. Hassenger rated the episode a 3 out of 5 stars. The A.V. Club's Manuel Betancourt, grading the episode a B+, enjoyed the narrative implications of the flashback scene and how it had underscored the differences between Kenobi and Anakin's personalities, with Reva's inclusion being a "wild card" and opining that Reva's revelation of her backstory had featured too much exposition. At Den of Geek, Megan Crouse gave it a rating of 4 stars out of 5. Despite the rating, she was critical of the show's visuals and production values, feeling the visuals were attempting to be evocative of the prequel trilogy, but failed to do so and thought The Mandalorian had been superior overall. Additionally, she viewed the flashbacks, while narratively effective, to be reminiscient of The Book of Boba Fett's flashback sequences, but thought the action scene between Vader and Reva to effectively convey characterization.
