= Obi-Wan Kenobi (miniseries) =

2022 Star Wars television miniseries

- Also known as: Star Wars: Obi-Wan Kenobi
- Genre: Action-adventure; Space opera
- Based on: Star Wars by George Lucas
- Showrunner: Joby Harold
- Directed by: Deborah Chow
- Starring: Ewan McGregor
- Theme music composer: John Williams; William Ross (adaptation)
- Composer: Natalie Holt
- Country of origin: United States
- Original language: English
- No. of seasons: 1
- No. of episodes: 6

Production
- Executive producers: Deborah Chow; Ewan McGregor; Kathleen Kennedy; Michelle Rejwan; Joby Harold
- Producers: Thomas Hayslip; Katterli Frauenfelder
- Production location: Los Angeles, California
- Cinematography: Chung-hoon Chung
- Editors: Nicolas De Toth; Kelley Dixon; Josh Earl
- Running time: 36–53 minutes
- Production company: Lucasfilm

Original release
- Network: Disney+
- Release: May 27 – June 22, 2022

Obi-Wan Kenobi, also known as Star Wars: Obi-Wan Kenobi, is an American space opera television miniseries produced by Lucasfilm for the streaming service Disney+. It is part of the Star Wars franchise. Set ten years after the Jedi Order was purged during the events of the film Star Wars: Episode III – Revenge of the Sith (2005), the series follows surviving Jedi Master Obi-Wan Kenobi who emerges from hiding to rescue the kidnapped Princess Leia from the Galactic Empire's Inquisitors. This brings Kenobi into conflict with his former apprentice Anakin Skywalker, now a Sith known as Darth Vader.

Ewan McGregor stars as the title character, reprising his role from the Star Wars prequel trilogy. Co-stars such as Joel Edgerton, Bonnie Piesse, Jimmy Smits, Hayden Christensen (Vader), and Ian McDiarmid also reprise their prequel trilogy roles, while Vivien Lyra Blair debuts as a young Leia Organa. The project originated as a spin-off film written by Hossein Amini and directed by Stephen Daldry, but it was reworked as a limited series following the commercial failure of the film Solo: A Star Wars Story (2018). McGregor was confirmed to be starring in the series in August 2019, and Deborah Chow was hired to direct all of the episodes a month later. Production was scheduled to begin in July 2020, but the series was put on hold in January 2020 because Lucasfilm was unsatisfied with the scripts. Joby Harold was hired to rewrite the series and serve as showrunner in April 2020, executive producing with Chow, McGregor, Kathleen Kennedy, and Michelle Rejwan. Additional casting took place in March 2021. Filming began by that May in Los Angeles, using StageCraft video wall technology, and wrapped by that September. Natalie Holt composed the original score, while Star Wars film composer John Williams wrote a new main theme for Kenobi that William Ross adapted for several scenes.

Obi-Wan Kenobi premiered on May 27, 2022, with its first two episodes. The other four episodes were released weekly through June 22. The series received generally positive reviews from critics, with praise directed towards McGregor's performance, the action sequences, John Williams's new main theme, the character-driven narrative, and the series' emotional weight, although the writing received some criticism. It also received multiple accolades, including winning Best Limited Event Series for Streaming and Best Guest Starring Role on Television (for Christensen) at the 47th Saturn Awards, as well as a nomination for Outstanding Limited or Anthology Series at the 75th Primetime Emmy Awards.

== Premise ==
The series is set after the events of the film Star Wars: Episode III – Revenge of the Sith (2005), during which the Jedi Order was all but destroyed and Jedi Master Obi-Wan Kenobi's apprentice, Anakin Skywalker, became the Sith Lord Darth Vader. After remaining in hiding for the next ten years on the planet Tatooine, watching over Anakin's son Luke, Kenobi is called on a mission to rescue Anakin's daughter Leia when she is kidnapped by the Galactic Empire's Jedi-hunting Inquisitors in a plot to draw Kenobi out. This brings Kenobi into conflict with Vader, who he believed to be dead, forcing Kenobi to face his traumatic past and guilty feelings.

== Episodes ==
| No. | Title | Directed by | Written by | Original release date |
|---|---|---|---|---|
| 1 | "Part I" | Deborah Chow | Teleplay by : Joby Harold and Hossein Amini and Stuart Beattie; Story by : Stuart Beattie and Hossein Amini | May 27, 2022 |
Ten years after Order 66, when most of the Jedi Order were killed, reclusive former Jedi Master Obi-Wan Kenobi is hiding in a cave on Tatooine, under the alias "Ben." He watches over a young Luke Skywalker, the son of his former apprentice-turned-enemy Anakin Skywalker, now living with his uncle and aunt, Owen and Beru Lars, despite Owen disliking Kenobi. Kenobi has also lost his connection to the Force, cannot communicate with the Force spirit of his former deceased master, Qui-Gon Jinn, and experiences nightmares from his past. The Inquisitors, led by the Grand Inquisitor, look for a Jedi named Nari on Tatooine. Reva Sevander, Third Sister of the Inquisitors, is also obsessed with finding Kenobi, who is widely believed to be dead. In an attempt to lure him, she hires bounty hunters to kidnap Princess Leia Organa from Alderaan. Nari tries to get help from Kenobi but is rejected. Nari is later found killed and hanging from a bridge in the town. Kenobi agrees to rescue Leia after her adoptive father, Bail Organa, visits his home.
| 2 | "Part II" | Deborah Chow | Teleplay by : Joby Harold; Story by : Stuart Beattie and Hossein Amini | May 27, 2022 |
After tracking Leia's kidnappers to the planet Daiyu, Kenobi encounters con man Haja Estree, who pretends to be a Jedi. Haja directs Kenobi to Leia's location, where he defeats the kidnappers and rescues her. The Grand Inquisitor learns of their presence and puts the city on lockdown. Reva disobeys orders and places a new bounty on Kenobi, causing mercenaries around the city to target him and Leia. When Leia realizes they are after Kenobi, she loses trust in him and runs away. Escaping to a roof with mercenaries attempting to kill them, Leia jumps off and Kenobi saves her using the Force, regaining her trust. Haja directs them to an unguarded cargo port from which they can escape, but cannot stop Reva from following them. The Grand Inquisitor arrives to arrest Kenobi himself, but Reva stabs him with her lightsaber. As Kenobi and Leia escape, Reva reveals that Anakin, whom Kenobi believed to be dead, is still alive as Darth Vader. Elsewhere, Vader awakens in a bacta tank.
| 3 | "Part III" | Deborah Chow | Joby Harold & Hannah Friedman and Hossein Amini and Stuart Beattie | June 1, 2022 |
From his fortress on Mustafar, Vader instructs Reva to find Kenobi, promising to promote her to Grand Inquisitor if she succeeds. Kenobi and Leia's transport lands on the mining planet Mapuzo and they proceed to the rendezvous provided by Haja. Finding no one there, they take a ride on an Imperial transport. They are discovered and Imperial troops are sent to capture them, but they receive help from an Imperial officer, Tala, who is a member of the Path, an underground network that hides dissidents and outlaws hunted by the Empire. She escorts them to a secret subterranean passageway, but before they leave, Vader and the Inquisitors arrive and begin to harm innocent bystanders to lure Kenobi to reveal himself. Kenobi sends Leia and Tala ahead while he provides a distraction. He is eventually confronted by Vader, who overpowers Kenobi and burns him. Tala provides a distraction to save Kenobi, but Leia is captured by Reva.
| 4 | "Part IV" | Deborah Chow | Joby Harold & Hannah Friedman | June 8, 2022 |
Having escaped Vader on Mapuzo, Kenobi and Tala arrive at a Path facility on Jabiim. Meanwhile, Leia, being held in Fortress Inquisitorius, the stronghold headquarters of the Inquisitors located on Nur, is interrogated by Reva for details on the Path. Kenobi and Tala plan to infiltrate the fortress to rescue Leia. Once inside, Kenobi discovers a trophy vault filled with the preserved corpses of Jedi who had been captured and killed, including a Youngling. They rescue Leia but Tala's cover is blown and their presence is revealed. They eventually escape with help from Path commander Roken and his guerilla troops. Vader, angered by the events, moves to kill Reva for her failure, but spares her when she reveals that a tracker was attached to Leia's companion droid, Lola, in anticipation of a rescue.
| 5 | "Part V" | Deborah Chow | Joby Harold & Andrew Stanton | June 15, 2022 |
Vader reflects on lightsaber training he had with Kenobi prior to the Clone Wars as he tracks the Path network to Jabiim. Vader promotes Reva to Grand Inquisitor, who leads a siege on the Path facility, deactivating its escape doors. To stall for time, Kenobi speaks with Reva and deduces that she knows Vader's true identity from witnessing his massacre at the Jedi Temple on Coruscant when she was a Youngling. She reveals she wanted to gain Vader's favor to kill him for revenge. The facility is then breached, with Tala sacrificing herself to save Kenobi. Realizing they cannot win, Kenobi surrenders and is taken to Reva. He convinces Reva to kill Vader when she delivers Kenobi. Meanwhile, Leia opens the facility doors after removing Lola's tracker, allowing the Path to escape as Vader arrives at the docking bay. Reva uses this opportunity to try to kill Vader, but is quickly overpowered after a brief duel and stabbed. She is left for dead as the original Grand Inquisitor arrives to reaffirm his status. As the Path network escapes, Reva finds Bail Organa's message on Kenobi's transmitter, revealing Luke's location on Tatooine.
| 6 | "Part VI" | Deborah Chow | Teleplay by : Joby Harold & Andrew Stanton and Hossein Amini; Story by : Stuart Beattie and Joby Harold & Andrew Stanton | June 22, 2022 |
Reva arrives on Tatooine to find Luke, while Darth Vader and the Empire pursue the Path network. Kenobi decides to lure Vader away and confront him alone on a nearby planet, allowing the Path to escape. After regaining his full connection to the Force, Kenobi incapacitates Vader. Realizing Anakin has completely embraced his identity as Darth Vader, a saddened Kenobi leaves. At Luke's home, Reva is confronted by Owen and Beru. She subdues them and pursues Luke into the desert. After remembering Anakin's massacre of the Jedi Temple, she decides to return Luke to his family. Kenobi congratulates her for overcoming her trauma and liberating herself from the Dark Side. On Mustafar, a healed Vader abandons his search for Kenobi after his master, Emperor Palpatine, questions his motives and loyalty. Back on Alderaan, Leia finds new resolve in her duties as a princess. Kenobi visits the Organas and affirms that he will help them when needed. Returning to Tatooine, he resolves his conflict with Owen by agreeing to let Luke have a normal life and meets with him for the very first time. Having found inner peace, Kenobi manages to converse with the Force spirit of Qui-Gon Jinn.

== Cast and characters ==
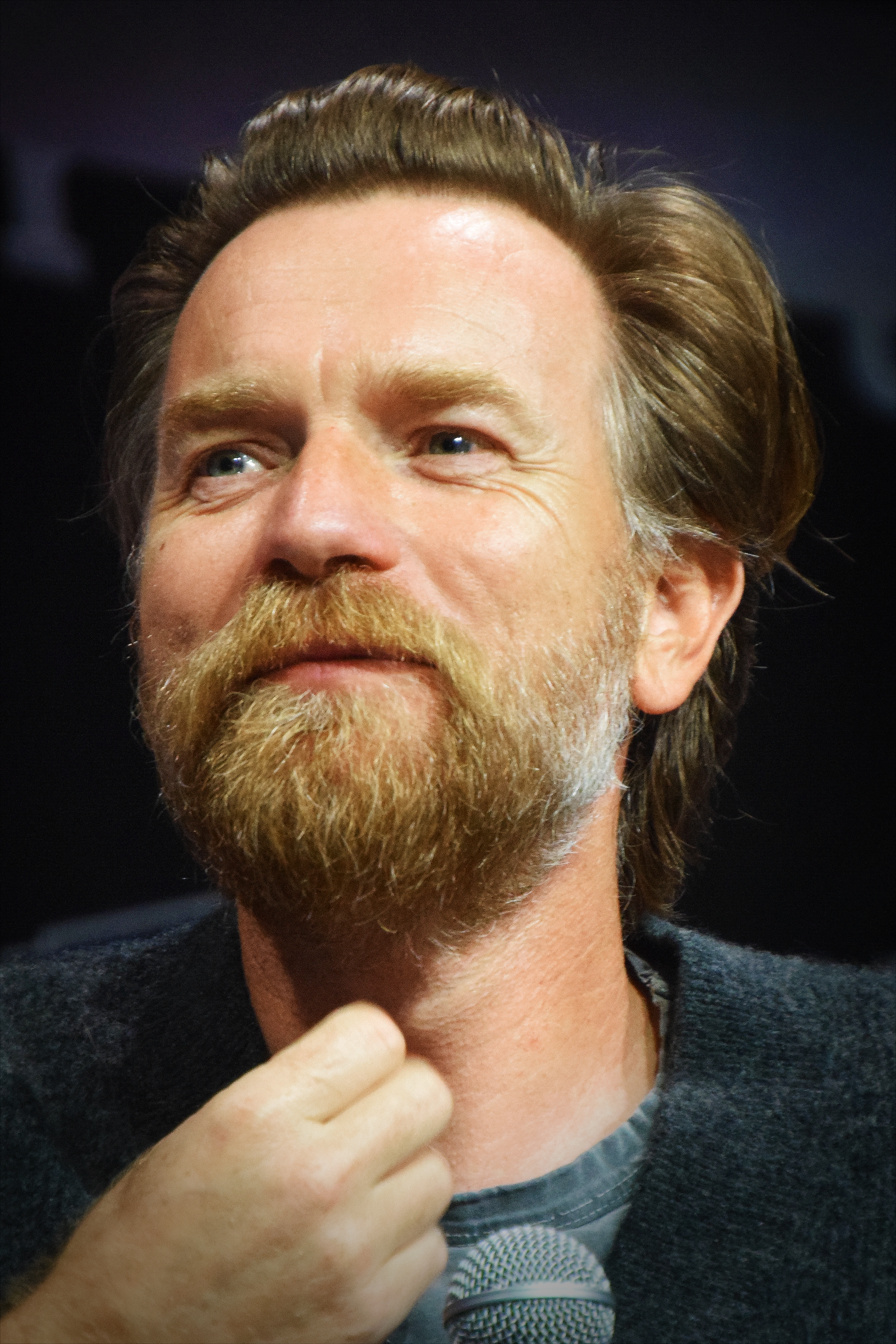
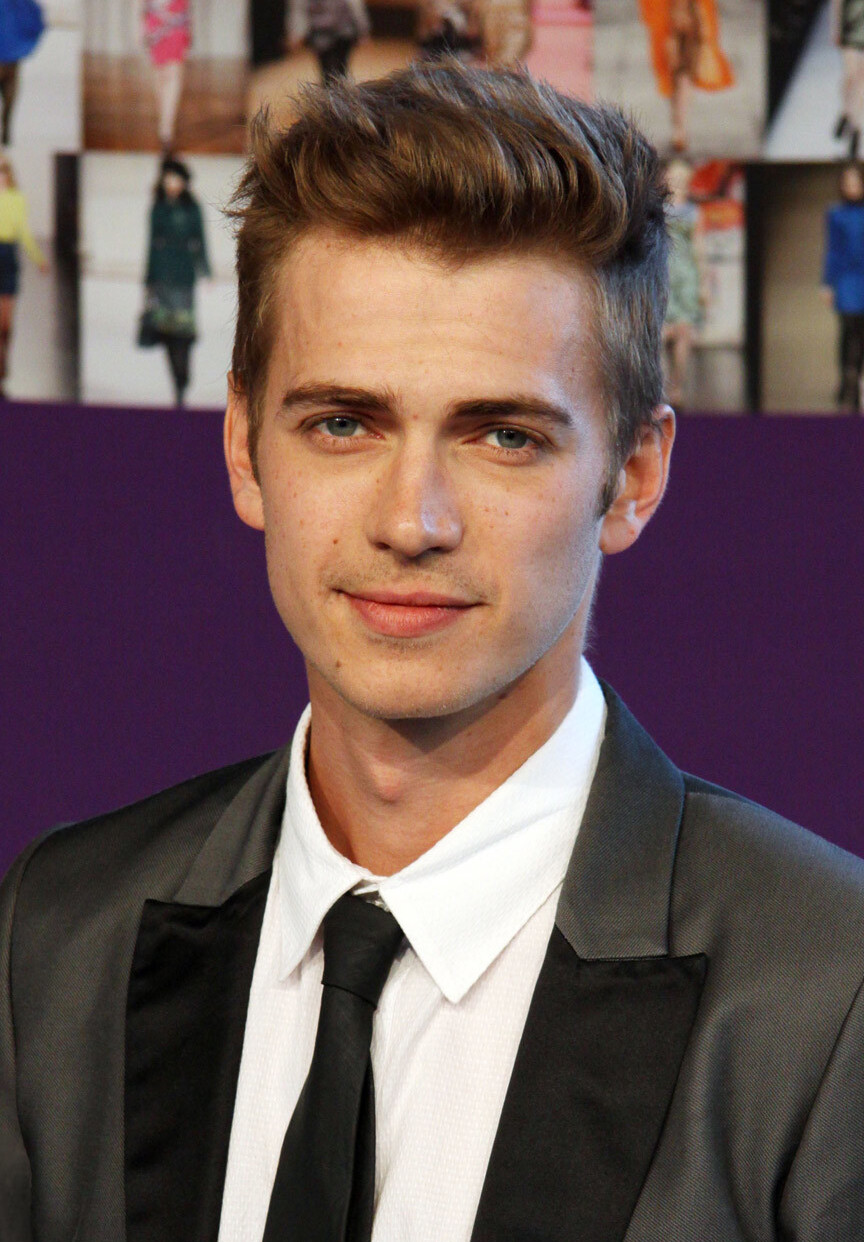
Ewan McGregor and Hayden Christensen reprise their roles as Obi-Wan Kenobi and Anakin Skywalker / Darth Vader, respectively.

=== Starring ===
- Ewan McGregor as Obi-Wan Kenobi:
  A Jedi Master who survived Order 66 and now lives in exile, under the name "Ben", on the planet Tatooine, watching over young Luke Skywalker. McGregor was excited to play a version of the character closer to Alec Guinness's portrayal from the original Star Wars trilogy than his own younger version from the prequel trilogy, with Kenobi beginning the series "broken, and faithless, and beaten, [having] somewhat given up". Executive producer Michelle Rejwan described Kenobi as being in a "pretty traumatic moment" following his losses in Revenge of the Sith (2005), including his apprentice Anakin's fall to the dark side of the Force. Kenobi left Anakin for dead on Mustafar at the end of the film and feels guilty for doing so, with director Deborah Chow being intrigued by the idea that Kenobi might still care deeply for Anakin. Head writer Joby Harold said the series would relate the "very emotional" version of Kenobi in the prequels to Alec Guinness's "zen master" in A New Hope (1977). McGregor was part of the conversations about Kenobi's characterization in the series, and rewatched the Skywalker Saga films to prepare. He also read science fiction novels, including those written by Iain M. Banks, for the role.

=== Recurring co-stars ===
- Rupert Friend as the Grand Inquisitor:
  A member of the Pau'an species from Utapau who is the highest-ranking Inquisitor of the Galactic Empire. He was once a member of the Jedi Order, serving as a Jedi Temple Guard. Friend said the character enjoyed the sound of his own voice and naively believed himself to be "on a par" with Darth Vader, wishing to replace him as Emperor Palpatine's apprentice. Friend was excited to bring the Grand Inquisitor to live action and wanted to remain faithful to his characterization in the animated series Star Wars Rebels, though he, Chow, and Rebels co-creator Dave Filoni did not want Friend to do an impression of original actor Jason Isaacs.
- Sung Kang as the Fifth Brother: An Inquisitor who rivals Reva and strictly follows orders from both the Grand Inquisitor and Darth Vader. The Fifth Brother was previously voiced by Philip Anthony-Rodriguez in Rebels.
- Moses Ingram as Reva Sevander / Third Sister:
  A ruthless, ambitious Inquisitor who feels a need to prove herself to the Grand Inquisitor and Darth Vader. A former Jedi Youngling, she secretly plots revenge against Vader for killing her peers during Order 66. Reva shares a common goal in being dedicated to finding Kenobi, though she is open to using more impulsive tactics. Harold believed Reva would "contribute to the legacy of Star Wars villains in a really interesting way", while Ingram described her as a "full-on athlete" and a badass. Ingram felt forgiveness was a central theme of her character, and that Reva was motivated by trauma from the pain of her past, adding "if she could let it go, or if she could at least cope better, she wouldn't need to do the things that she's doing". She also influenced Reva's appearance, insisting that the character use her natural kinky hair rather than a wig so that African-American children could dress up as the character for Halloween. Ayaamii Sledge portrays a young Reva.
- Vivien Lyra Blair as Leia Organa: Anakin Skywalker's daughter, Luke's twin sister, and a princess on Alderaan kidnapped by hired bounty hunters. Blair hoped her performance would honor Carrie Fisher's portrayal of the character, who originated the role, along with the Star Wars fanbase.
- Kumail Nanjiani as Haja Estree: A street-level con artist working on the streets of Daiyu, posing as a Jedi. Nanjiani researched real-life con artists and magicians to prepare for the role.
- Hayden Christensen as Anakin Skywalker / Darth Vader:
  Kenobi's former apprentice who fell to the dark side and became a Sith Lord. He is the father of Luke Skywalker and Leia Organa. Having not played the character since 2005, Christensen rewatched the Skywalker Saga films, as well as the animated series Star Wars: The Clone Wars and Rebels, to prepare for the role. He enjoyed seeing how the animated series had further explored the relationship between Anakin and Kenobi. Christensen was excited to portray Darth Vader, having primarily portrayed the character as Anakin Skywalker previously, and discussed how to portray Vader's simultaneous strength and imprisonment with Chow; he called Vader in the series "very powerful". While Christensen primarily portrays Vader, Dmitrious Bistrevsky serves as the in-suit performer for Vader, while Tom O'Connell served as the stunt double. James Earl Jones's voice is used for Darth Vader, as with previous Star Wars media, but his lines in the series were generated by an AI program called Respeecher (which was also used for Luke Skywalker in The Book of Boba Fett) based on recordings of Jones from the films.
- Indira Varma as Tala Durith: A disillusioned Imperial officer on the planet Mapuzo who helps Jedi escape the Empire with help from The Path.
- O'Shea Jackson Jr. as Kawlan Roken: A leader in The Path network who helps Jedi escape the Empire.

=== Other co-stars ===
- Benny Safdie as Nari: A Jedi hiding on Tatooine who escaped Order 66 as a Youngling.
- Joel Edgerton as Owen Lars: A moisture farmer on Tatooine, Anakin Skywalker's step-brother, and Luke's uncle, who is skeptical of Kenobi's presence on Tatooine and desired involvement with Luke's life.
- Bonnie Piesse as Beru Whitesun Lars: Owen's wife and Luke's aunt.
- Simone Kessell as Breha Organa: Queen of Alderaan, Leia's adoptive mother, and wife of Bail Organa. Breha was originally portrayed by Rebecca Jackson Mendoza in Revenge of the Sith.
- Flea as Vect Nokru: A bounty hunter hired to kidnap Leia Organa.
- Jimmy Smits as Bail Organa: Leia's adoptive father and Senator of Alderaan.
- Marisé Álvarez as Nyche Horn: A refugee with a young son seeking transport from Daiyu to Corellia.
- Rya Kihlstedt as the Fourth Sister: An Inquisitor.
- Zach Braff as the voice of Freck: A transport driver for the Imperial mining facility on the planet Mapuzo.
- Maya Erskine as Sully: A member in The Path network who helps Jedi escape the Empire.
- Ian McDiarmid as Emperor Palpatine: The Dark Lord of the Sith and Darth Vader's master.

Additionally, Ming Qiu, a stunt performer from the Star Wars series The Mandalorian and The Book of Boba Fett, portrays Jedi Master Minas Velti during the Order 66 flashback, Grant Feely appears as Luke Skywalker, Anakin's son, and Anthony Daniels reprises his franchise role as C-3PO while Temuera Morrison appears as a homeless veteran clone trooper after playing the clones in previous Star Wars media. Ewan McGregor's daughter Esther McGregor plays Tetha Grig, a spice dealer that Kenobi encounters on the streets of Daiyu. Dustin Ceithamer portrays the droid NED-B. Liam Neeson reprises his role as Qui-Gon Jinn, Obi-Wan's deceased master, in an uncredited cameo appearance.

== Production ==
=== Background ===
Disney CEO Bob Iger announced the development of several Star Wars standalone spin-off films in February 2013. Obi-Wan Kenobi was the overwhelming winner of a poll by The Hollywood Reporter in August 2016 that asked which Star Wars character deserved a spin-off film. Ewan McGregor, who portrayed Kenobi in the Star Wars prequel trilogy, had informally expressed willingness to reprise the role, which led to a formal meeting with Lucasfilm so the company could gauge his interest in returning to the character for a spin-off film. Development on such a film soon began, with Stephen Daldry entering talks to direct the project in August 2017. McGregor was set as a producer on the project. Daldry was expected to oversee the development and writing with Lucasfilm, and contacted Hossein Amini about writing the film. Amini joined the project in late 2017.

In May 2018, the film was reportedly titled Obi-Wan: A Star Wars Story, with a plot involving Kenobi protecting a young Luke Skywalker on the planet Tatooine during tensions between local farmers and Tusken Raiders. Production on the film was expected to take place in Northern Ireland under the working title Joshua Tree, beginning in 2019 at Paint Hall Studios in Belfast once production on the final season of Game of Thrones (2011–2019) ended in late 2018. However, Disney cancelled their planned Star Wars spin-off films, including the Kenobi film, following the financial failure of Solo: A Star Wars Story (2018). Lucasfilm's focus changed to making series for the streaming service Disney+, such as The Mandalorian (2019–2023). In August 2018, McGregor said he had been asked about a Kenobi spin-off for "years and years" and was happy to be involved but said there were no plans for such a film at that time. He was interested in exploring the character in the time between his portrayal in the prequel films and that of Alec Guinness in the original trilogy, and wanted to see the story of "a man who's lost his faith" that could show how his version, who "always has a funny line to say or always seems to be calm and is a good warrior", becomes a "broken man" and has to get "back together again" to match Guinness's portrayal.

=== Development ===
McGregor entered negotiations to star in a television series for Disney+ centered on Obi-Wan Kenobi by mid-August 2019. Later that month, at Disney's D23 event, Lucasfilm president Kathleen Kennedy and McGregor officially announced that the actor would be reprising his role as Kenobi in a new series for Disney+, set eight years after the events of Star Wars: Episode III – Revenge of the Sith (2005). Filming was scheduled to begin in July 2020, and scripts for the six-episode limited series had already been written by Amini at the time of the announcement. McGregor said the announcement was a relief, explaining that he had been lying about his involvement in a Kenobi spin-off for four years. A month later, Kennedy announced that Deborah Chow would direct the Kenobi series after impressing Kennedy with her work directing episodes of The Mandalorian.

In November 2019, Amini said the series' time period was fascinating since Kenobi is dealing with the loss of his friends and the Jedi Order, which allowed Amini to explore aspects of the Star Wars franchise other than action, such as its spiritual side. He took inspiration from the sources that Star Wars creator George Lucas was originally inspired by, including Joseph Campbell's The Hero with a Thousand Faces, Samurai history and culture, and Buddhism. Comparing the series' scripts to his original film plans, Amini said he was able to explore the character, politics, and history more in the series than in a two-hour film where "there is always an imperative for the action and the plot to move particularly fast". Chow felt her work on The Mandalorian was the best training she could have for the Kenobi series, learning from that series' executive producers Jon Favreau and Dave Filoni.

Pre-production on the series was underway at Pinewood Studios in London by January 2020, and screen tests were taking place with potential actors opposite McGregor. By the end of the month, rumors began circulating that the series had been cancelled due to production problems. While this was not the case, the series was put on indefinite hold and the assembled crew was sent home. Kennedy was said to be unhappy with the series' scripts, which reportedly featured a storyline similar to the story of The Mandalorian, in which the title character protects "The Child", with Kenobi protecting a young Skywalker from various threats. Chow had shown these scripts to Favreau and Filoni, who expressed concern over the similarities to The Mandalorian and encouraged Chow and the series to "go bigger". Lucasfilm began looking for a new writer for the series to start over on the scripts, with Chow still expected to direct. Kennedy explained that they were hoping to have a "hopeful, uplifting story", and said executing that would be tricky given the state that Kenobi is in after Revenge of the Sith. She added, "You can't just wave the magic wand with any writer and arrive at a story that necessarily reflects what you want to feel". The goal was for pre-production to begin again in mid-2020 once the scripts had been rewritten. The series was also reportedly being reworked from six episodes to four, but McGregor said he did not believe this was the case. He added that Lucasfilm had decided to spend more time working on the scripts following the release of Star Wars: The Rise of Skywalker (2019), and filming had been postponed until January 2021, but he did not think this would impact the series' planned release schedule.

Joby Harold was hired to take over as writer from Amini in April 2020, and serve as showrunner. That October, filming was delayed until March 2021 due to the COVID-19 pandemic. At Disney's Investor Day event on December 10, Kennedy announced that the series was officially titled Obi-Wan Kenobi, and confirmed that Chow was directing. In February 2021, McGregor revealed that filming for the series would take place in Los Angeles rather than London and Boston, Lincolnshire, England, as had previously been reported. The series is executive-produced by Kennedy, Michelle Rejwan, Chow, McGregor, and Harold, and consists of six episodes.

Obi-Wan Kenobi was conceived as a limited series, with Chow describing it as "one big story with a beginning, middle, and end". Despite this, Kennedy said there was a chance that more of the series could be made due to the enjoyable time the cast and crew had creating it, as long as there was a compelling story reason to return to the character, with both McGregor and Christensen expressing interest in making another season. In April 2023, Kennedy noted a second season was not considered an "active development" for Lucasfilm, reiterating Chow and McGregor's interest in more, and saying the company might return to the character and storyline "down the road".

=== Writing ===
According to Chow, the story went through "significant changes" after Harold's hiring, though some story elements conceived by Amini are included in the first three episodes and the finale, with Amini and Stuart Beattie receiving writing credits for those. Hannah Friedman and Andrew Stanton were additional writers on the series. Harold wanted to explore what happened between McGregor's portrayal of Kenobi and that of Alec Guinness in the original trilogy, and noted that the series takes place when the Empire is "in the ascendancy" and the Jedi have been wiped out, with any remaining survivors being on the run and in hiding. He said that Kenobi's past, particularly his relationship with Anakin, makes him a "man who's very much defined by that history, whether he wants to be or not". He added that a crucial part of Kenobi's journey will involve "reconciling that past and coming to understand it and coming to understand his place in it", and also the "places he has to go emotionally as well as physically, and some of those battles he has to fight", which ultimately have "to do with facing that past and understanding who he was, his part in his own history, in the history of others".

Harold also chose to include Leia in the series as he felt that Kenobi would also look over Leia. In writing her dialogue, he wanted her to come across as "spirited and not just a grown-up writing for a kid", and used the films Paper Moon (1973) and Midnight Run (1988) as inspiration for her interactions with Kenobi. He also noted that the series recontextualizes moments in future chronological installments of the franchise, such as providing additional context behind Leia's message to Kenobi in A New Hope (1977), and as such, he "completely focused on [Obi-Wan Kenobi] being Episode 3.5, between the original trilogy and the prequels, as it had to marry the storytelling choices between those two trilogies", and wanted it to feel like a "natural link" between the original and prequel trilogies. Harold also clarified that the series would not break canon after speculation arose that it would deviate from it due to Reva stabbing the Grand Inquisitor in "Part II", with many fans presuming he was dead, thus contradicting the events of Star Wars Rebels (2014–2018).

Kennedy and Chow cautioned the writers against making any overt connections to The Mandalorian and its spin-off series, with Chow saying that the strongest connections between Obi-Wan Kenobi and the rest of the Star Wars franchise were to the prequel films. Chow wanted to be faithful to George Lucas's original vision for the franchise and worked to connect elements from the original trilogy and prequel trilogy. She researched the Expanded Universe in preparation for the series, citing John Jackson Miller's novel Star Wars: Kenobi (2013) as inspiration for establishing the "tone", but was not influenced by its plot, and a Sideshow statue of Kenobi, which served as a visual reference for Chow. She also worked to make it a character-driven story, comparing this to films such as Logan (2017) and Joker (2019), saying that it was "where you take one character out of a big franchise and then you really have the time and you go a lot deeper with the character". Additional inspirations included "gritty, poetic westerns" such as The Assassination of Jesse James by the Coward Robert Ford (2007) and The Proposition (2005), as well as the works of Akira Kurosawa. She felt that there was a "strong correlation" between the Jedi and the Ronin with their "ethical code that goes along with it, in a world that's vastly changed". A new planet introduced for the series is Daiyu, which Harold compared to Hong Kong with a "graffiti-ridden nightlife"; it serves as a contrast to the desert planet Tatooine, where much of the series takes place.

Long discussions were held before it was decided to include Darth Vader in the series, and Chow said this decision was "not made lightly... Anakin and Vader are a huge and very profound part of [Kenobi's] life. We ended up feeling that he made sense in telling this story." Chow had championed the idea of including Vader in the series when executives at Lucasfilm were unsure whether they should. Similar to Kenobi's character in the show, Chow said that Vader's character "isn't quite as fully formed as A New Hope", and she added that Vader's appearance in the series re-contextualizes the character's scene with Kenobi in A New Hope. The series also features the live-action introduction of Vader's Inquisitors, who are tasked with hunting down the remaining Jedi, after appearing in other Star Wars media. The way that Vader appears in the series and the idea to introduce the Inquisitors were both suggested by Filoni. The original scripts featured different villains, including Darth Maul, but Chow decided not to use him as she felt it would be "a little bit much" to have both Maul and Vader due to the large impact that the latter has on the story. She also acknowledged that Filoni had already told the story of Kenobi and Maul in this time period in the Star Wars Rebels episode "Twin Suns".

=== Casting ===
Along with the series' announcement at D23 in August 2019 came confirmation that McGregor would star in the series, reprising his role as Kenobi from the prequel trilogy. By the time the production shut down in January 2020, Ray Park was preparing to reprise his role as Darth Maul and an actor had been cast to portray a young Luke Skywalker. Both left the series after Maul was written out of the new scripts and production was delayed.

Kennedy announced in December 2020 that Hayden Christensen would reprise his role from the prequel trilogy as Anakin Skywalker / Darth Vader in the series. Chow had met with Christensen at his farm in Canada in late 2019 to provide him an in-person pitch for the series. McGregor said reuniting with Christensen on the series was "the most beautiful thing of all", while Kennedy described it as the "rematch of the century". James Earl Jones was announced as reprising his franchise role as the voice of Darth Vader, though his voice was generated by an AI program called Respeecher based on previous recordings of Jones' voice. In March 2021, Moses Ingram, Kumail Nanjiani, Indira Varma, Rupert Friend, O'Shea Jackson Jr., Sung Kang, Simone Kessell, and Benny Safdie joined the cast, with Joel Edgerton and Bonnie Piesse reprising their roles as Owen Lars and Beru Whitesun Lars, respectively, from the prequel films. Ingram was reported to be playing a "very important role" for the series. A month later, Maya Erskine was cast in a supporting role, reportedly for at least three episodes, while Rory Ross revealed his involvement in January 2022.

In March 2022, Ingram, Friend, and Kang were revealed to be portraying the Inquisitors Reva / the Third Sister, the Grand Inquisitor, and the Fifth Brother, respectively. The Grand Inquisitor and the Fifth Brother previously appeared in Star Wars Rebels, voiced by Jason Isaacs and Philip Anthony-Rodriguez, respectively. Isaacs had previously expressed interest in reprising his role in live-action. Varma was confirmed to be playing an Imperial officer, and Grant Feely was revealed to have been cast as the new actor for young Luke Skywalker. The series' premiere in May 2022 revealed that Jimmy Smits was reprising his role from the prequel films as Senator Bail Organa. Kessell portrays his wife, Queen Breha, replacing Rebecca Jackson Mendoza who briefly portrayed the character in Revenge of the Sith. Vivien Lyra Blair was revealed to be cast as a young Leia Organa.

Ian McDiarmid and Liam Neeson reprise their roles as Palpatine and Qui-Gon Jinn in the series finale in cameo appearances. Although Neeson had previously expressed hesitation to reprise the role in a TV series because he prefers films, he agreed to appear out of respect for Lucas and because he did not want Qui-Gon to be recast. Industry insider Jeff Sneider said in 2025 that Natalie Portman, who portrayed Padmé Amidala in the prequel films, shot "some stuff" for the show while working on the Marvel Cinematic Universe (MCU) film Thor: Love and Thunder (2022) that did not make the final cut.

=== Design ===
Doug Chiang and Todd Cherniawsky were the production designers for the series, with Suttirat Anne Larlarb as costume designer. Chiang, who is the vice president and executive creative director of Lucasfilm overseeing the designs of all the projects, said the biggest challenge of the series was bridging the designs of the prequel and original trilogies together and remaining faithful to the films while adding new elements. For instance, the designs of Tatooine remain consistent with the films but they were able to bring new elements to the series for the town of Anchorhead, which had first been referenced in Star Wars (1977) but had never been portrayed on screen before. Chiang and Cherniawsky collaborated to create a design and achieve the "balance" that Chow desired.

Shaun Smith served as prosthetic supervisor for the show's makeup effects team, overseeing the creation and application of facial and body prosthetics across the series, including Darth Vader's on‑screen appearance. Hayden Christensen said, "I got to work with a great team of makeup artists, led by a fellow called Shaun Smith, and they did some incredible work", adding the application took "a good four to five hours" per session and helped him inhabit the character. Production designer Doug Chiang worked closely with makeup and prosthetics team to ensure the prosthetics matched the series' creative vision.

Propmaster Brad Elliott rewatched all the films in the prequel trilogy to prepare for his work on the series. He was influenced by resources Pablo Hidalgo brought for the creative team, Ralph McQuarrie's work on the original trilogy, and techniques prop builders used in the original trilogy. He chose to keep some of Kenobi's belongings, such as his macrobinoculars, holoprojectors, and datapad from the prequel trilogy. He felt "It made sense that Kenobi would take a few items with him to watch over Luke" and explained that he kept the holoprojector in case Bail Organa had contacted him. Creating Kenobi's lightsaber was challenging for the prop builders, as prop designers from the prequel and original trilogies did not use the same hilt designs, requiring the prop team on the series to merge the two iterations together "into something new that still felt authentic". He further explained that the hilt's visual aesthetic was primarily inspired from the prequel trilogy, but the team had upgraded the emitter to imitate Guinness's lightsaber in Star Wars. When creating the lightsabers for the Inquisitors, Filoni advised they imagined that the animated version was an "exaggerated version" of the live-action. Elliot says this helped the team keep the overall form of the lightsabers from Rebels, in which the Inquisitors first appeared, but change the proportions for human contact. The team customized the diameter of the lightsabers to accommodate the actors.

=== Filming ===
Filming was expected to begin in April 2021, in Los Angeles, California, with Deborah Chow directing; Filming began on May 4, 2021. Chung-hoon Chung served as cinematographer for the series, and the series uses the StageCraft video wall technology, which was previously used for The Mandalorian and The Book of Boba Fett. The series also filmed in The Volume set, the stoundstage on which StageCraft is implemented, at the Manhattan Beach Studios in Los Angeles. Chow chose Chung as the cinematographer as she liked his visual style, and felt that "he had done things that were smaller, that were emotionally intense with a strong visual identity, but he also had done huge commercial projects".

McGregor did costume tests for Obi-Wan Kenobi on the set of The Mandalorian, and said the StageCraft technology allowed him to enjoy working on the series more than he did on the prequel films due to the latter's extensive use of blue and green screen. Chow also said that her experience in directing episodes for The Mandalorian helped the production team to utilize the technology better. Actor Rupert Friend had completed his scenes by that August. Filming had wrapped by September 19, with Nicholas De Toth and Kelley Dixon finishing their scenes.

=== Music ===
Natalie Holt was hired to compose the series' score, making her the first woman to score a live-action Star Wars project. Recording for her music was reported to have been taking place for several months by mid-February 2022, when John Williams recorded the main theme for the series with an orchestra in Los Angeles. Holt herself later told Star Wars Insider that she was hired as composer in "late December" and "had to record in early March." Williams previously composed the scores for the main Star Wars films, and originally wrote a theme for Obi-Wan Kenobi in Star Wars (1977) which later became associated with the Force in general. Williams approached Kennedy about composing a new theme for the series because Kenobi was the only major character from the original film that he had not written a standalone theme for, and Holt said the new theme was reflective, wistful, and had an "element of hope" which "embodies the spirit of the show entirely". This was the second time Williams had written a theme for a Star Wars project for which he was not the main composer, following Solo, and was the first weekly television series for which he composed the theme since Amazing Stories in 1985.

Chow flew to London to meet with Holt and do a "two day intensive immersion" into the unfinished footage for the series. Holt then developed themes for the new characters and wrote an original score that she said had its "roots in the Star Wars tradition" more than Ludwig Göransson's Mandalorian music did. As with previous Star Wars scores, Holt took influence from real-world cultural music to represent different planets in the series, including using Latin music for one planet and more "Eastern" sounds from Thailand and Hong Kong for another. Holt used a hunting horn and some unusual percussion instruments played by Brian Kilgore to create the sound of the Inquisitors, which she said "stirs your guts. It's so haunting... It's that jarring, rhythmic texture". Göransson's recording engineer, Chris Fogel, worked with Holt on engineering the score for Obi-Wan Kenobi at Göransson's studio. Holt completed her work for the series by late April 2022. Williams' "The Imperial March", "Force Theme", and "Princess Leia's Theme" are quoted in the score for "Part VI".

In her interview with Star Wars Insider, Holt later said that "we didn't have very much time on Obi-Wan Kenobi", saying that was because it was "a very compressed process", which made work on the soundtrack "challenging" for her and Chow.

== Marketing ==
A short sizzle reel was released on November 12, 2021, as part of the Disney+ Day celebration, which included concept art, and McGregor and Chow discussing the series. The first trailer for the series was released on March 9, 2022, during Disney's annual shareholder meeting. The use of Williams's score in the trailer was a notable highlight, with Zack Sharf of Variety saying the "most awe-inspiring moment" of the trailer was its use of "Duel of the Fates" since it is "one of Williams's most bombastic pieces of score music" and featuring it in the trailer "points to a reunion of friend [Kenobi] and foe [Anakin Skywalker] in the new series". Daniel Chin of The Ringer also praised the trailer, saying that it "delivers a rush of Star Wars prequel nostalgia" and also noted the use of "Duel of the Fates", which he felt set the tone and stakes of the series. A second trailer was released on May 4 to commemorate Star Wars Day, with The Hollywood Reporter's Ryan Parker describing it as "intense". Many commentators highlighted the appearance of Darth Vader in the trailer. Michael McWhertor from Polygon felt it gave "a glimpse at the intensity of the Empire's hunt for one of the last remaining practitioners of the Force". Meanwhile, Joss Weiss of Syfy wrote that it depicts Kenobi dealing with "shameful mistakes of his own past". However, Angela Watercutter from Wired expressed skepticism based on the trailer, and opined "everything Star Wars just feels like it's on auto-pilot".

The series was promoted at Star Wars Celebration on May 26, including an advance screening of the first two episodes and a live performance of the main theme by the Pacific Symphony orchestra, conducted by Williams. In May 2022, Volkswagen released a commercial promoting the series and its electrical car model, ID. Buzz, featuring R2-D2, C-3PO, and McGregor. Two editions of the car, inspired by Star Wars, were created in a collaboration between designers from Volkswagen and Lucasfilm, and later shown at the 2022 Star Wars Celebration. The "Obi-Wan Wednesdays" product program, which reveals toys, apparel, action figures, accessories, books, and comics related to the series following an episode's release, started on May 25 and concluded on June 29.

== Release ==
=== Streaming ===
Obi-Wan Kenobi premiered on Disney+ on May 26, 2022, with its first two episodes. They were released three hours earlier than expected, at 9 p.m. PDT, rather than at 12 a.m. PDT on May 27. A content warning was added to the first, fifth, and sixth episodes due to the similarities between scenes depicting violence involving children during Order 66 and the Robb Elementary School shooting from May 24. The series' other four episodes were released weekly on Wednesdays from June 1 until June 22. It was originally set to premiere on May 25, the 45th anniversary of the original Star Wars film in 1977.

=== Home media ===
Obi-Wan Kenobi was released on Ultra HD Blu-ray and Blu-ray by Walt Disney Studios Home Entertainment on April 30, 2024, with SteelBook packaging and concept art cards. Bonus features include featurettes and commentary from Chow.

The Obi-Wan Kenobi Steelbook Blu-ray set ranked No. 2 on the Blu-ray Disc sales chart for the week ending May 4, 2024. It also ranked No. 2 on the 4K chart.

== Reception ==
=== Viewership ===
Whip Media, which tracks viewership data for the more than 25 million worldwide users of its TV Time app, calculated that Obi-Wan Kenobi was the most anticipated new television series of May 2022. Disney announced that the show was the most-watched series premiere for the streaming service in its opening weekend. JustWatch, a guide to streaming content with access to data from more than 20 million users around the world, reported that Obi-Wan Kenobi was the most-streamed series in the U.S. from the week ending May 29 to June 5. The streaming aggregator Reelgood, which monitors real-time data from 5 million users in the U.S. for original and acquired streaming programs and movies across subscription video-on-demand (SVOD) and ad-supported video-on-demand (AVOD) services, reported that Obi-Wan Kenobi was the most-streamed series during the week of June 10.

Analytics company Samba TV, which gathers viewership data from certain smart TVs and content providers, "Part I" was viewed in 2.14 million U.S. households from May 27–30, surpassing the premieres for The Mandalorian second season (2.08 million) and The Book of Boba Fett (1.5 million). During June 22–26, the Obi-Wan Kenobi finale was watched in 1.8 million households, up 20% from The Book of Boba Fett's 1.5 million. Reelgood later announced that Obi-Wan Kenobi was the second most-streamed series and the third most streamed-program during the week of June 22. According to the file-sharing news website TorrentFreak, Obi-Wan Kenobi was the sixth most-watched pirated television series of 2022. Luminate, which measures streaming performance in the U.S. by analyzing viewership data, audience engagement metrics, and content reach across various platforms, reported that Obi-Wan Kenobi accounted for 12.6% of total original series viewership on Disney+ between December 31, 2021, and December 29, 2022. It was the platform's second most-streamed show in 2022, with 6.5 billion minutes viewed in the United States.

=== Critical response ===
Obi-Wan Kenobi: Critical reception by episode
Obi-Wan Kenobi (2022): Percentage of positive critics' reviews tracked by the website Rotten Tomatoes

The review aggregator website Rotten Tomatoes reported an 82% approval rating and an average score of 6.60/10, based on 356 reviews. The website's critics consensus reads, "This won't be the Obi-Wan Kenobi some viewers are looking for, but Ewan McGregor's soulful performance and some refreshing twists make this a satisfying – if circuitous – addition to the Star Wars saga." On Metacritic, the series has a weighted average score of 73 out of 100, based on 19 critics, indicating "generally favorable reviews".

Matt Purslow of IGN gave the first two episodes an 8 out of 10, praising the storyline and Kenobi's character arc, but criticized the action sequences. He was hopeful for the rest of the series, calling it "a surprisingly emotional chapter in the larger Star Wars saga". CNN writer Brian Lowry commended McGregor's performance, writing that he "proves [to be] an enormous asset, perfectly capturing the legendary Jedi at this stage", while also feeling the show "concocts a more-than-plausible explanation" for Kenobi's actions during the time period. Writing for The Hollywood Reporter, Angie Han also gave the series a positive review, praising McGregor's performance, Chow's direction, the visual aesthetic of Daiyu, and the overall tone of the series, which she felt was similar to Rogue One (2016), adding that it "has the potential to serve up one of the more complex character studies ever seen in the franchise".

Stuart Heritage from The Guardian gave a 3-out-of-5-star rating to the first two episodes. Heritage criticized the slower pace of the first episode, but praised the action sequences of the second, comparing it to John Wick. Both Brian Truitt from USA Today and Stephen Kelly from the BBC also compared the series to John Wick. Truitt gave the first two episodes 3 out of 4 stars, while praising John Williams' main musical theme for the series and the character-driven narrative, in addition to saying that "Kenobi feels more like old-school Star Wars than its Disney+ predecessors." Kelly praised Harold's script on the first episode, but felt his script for the second was inferior. He also enjoyed Kenobi and Leia's dynamic in the second episode, along with the production values and cinematography, but said "scenes on Tatooine and Daiyu have a strange, artificial quality to them unbefitting of Obi-Wan's grand status". The A.V. Club's Sam Barsanti gave the first two episodes a B− grade; he praised Blair's performance as Leia, but noted inconsistencies with the original film and called Reva's plan to lure Kenobi by kidnapping Leia "absurd". Dominic Patten of Deadline Hollywood gave the first two episodes a negative review, saying that it is "nearly all undiluted nostalgia with no wisdom to impart and not much of a story to tell".

According to Lucasfilm executive Pablo Hidalgo, George Lucas was consulted regarding his thoughts of the project, and Lucas praised the miniseries highly, considering it one of his favorite new Disney Star Wars productions.

=== Accolades ===
| Award | Year | Category | Recipient(s) | Result | Ref. |
|---|---|---|---|---|---|
| Art Directors Guild Awards | 2023 | Excellence in Production Design for a Television Movie or Limited Series | Todd Cherniawsky and Doug Chiang | Nominated | |
| Astra TV Awards | 2024 | Best Actor in a Streaming Limited or Anthology Series or Movie | Ewan McGregor | Nominated | |
| Black Reel Awards for Television | 2022 | Outstanding Supporting Actress, TV Movie/Limited Series | Moses Ingram | Won | |
| Cinema Audio Society Awards | 2023 | Outstanding Achievement in Sound Mixing for a Non-Theatrical Motion Pictures or Limited Series | Julian Howarth, Bonnie Wild, Danielle Dupre, Scott R. Lewis, Doc Kane, Jason Butler (for "Part I") | Won | |
| Cinema Audio Society Awards | 2023 | Outstanding Achievement in Sound Mixing for Television Non Fiction, Variety or Music – Series or Specials | Richard Hays, Danielle Dupre, Scott Michael Smith (for Obi-Wan Kenobi: A Jedi's Return) | Nominated | |
| Critics' Choice Super Awards | 2023 | Best Actress in a Science Fiction/Fantasy Series | Moses Ingram | Nominated | |
| Critics' Choice Super Awards | 2023 | Best Villain in a Series | Hayden Christensen | Nominated | |
| Directors Guild of America Awards | 2023 | Outstanding Directorial Achievement in Limited Series or Movies for Television | Deborah Chow | Nominated | |
| Golden Trailer Awards | 2022 | Best Action for a TV/Streaming Series | Obi-Wan Kenobi | Won | |
| Nickelodeon Kids' Choice Awards | 2023 | Favorite Family TV Show | Obi-Wan Kenobi | Nominated | |
| Nickelodeon Kids' Choice Awards | 2023 | Favorite Male TV Star (Family) | Ewan McGregor | Nominated | |
| People's Choice Awards | 2022 | The Show of 2022 | Obi-Wan Kenobi | Nominated | |
| People's Choice Awards | 2022 | The Male TV Star of 2022 | Ewan McGregor | Nominated | |
| People's Choice Awards | 2022 | The Sci-Fi/Fantasy Show of 2022 | Obi-Wan Kenobi | Nominated | |
| Primetime Creative Arts Emmy Awards | 2024 | Outstanding Picture Editing for a Limited or Anthology Series or Movie | Kelley Dixon and Josh Earl (for "Part VI") | Nominated | |
| Primetime Creative Arts Emmy Awards | 2024 | Outstanding Sound Editing for a Limited or Anthology Series, Movie or Special | Matthew Wood, Trey Turner, Angela Ang, Ryan Cota, Jon Borland, Tim Farrell, Michael Levine, Ramiro Belgardt, Nicholas Fitzgerald, Thom Brennan, Ronni Brown, and Sean England | Nominated | |
| Primetime Creative Arts Emmy Awards | 2024 | Outstanding Sound Mixing for a Limited or Anthology Series or Movie | Danielle Dupre, Scott Lewis, Bonnie Wild, and Julian Howarth (for "Part VI") | Nominated | |
| Primetime Creative Arts Emmy Awards | 2024 | Outstanding Fantasy/Sci-Fi Costumes | Suttirat Anne Larlarb, Stacia Lang, and Lynda Foote (for "Part I") | Nominated | |
| Primetime Emmy Awards | 2024 | Outstanding Limited or Anthology Series | Deborah Chow, Ewan McGregor, Kathleen Kennedy, Michelle Rejwan, Joby Harold, Thomas Hayslip, and Katterli Frauenfelder | Nominated | |
| Producers Guild of America Awards | 2023 | Outstanding Producer of Limited or Anthology Series Television | Kathleen Kennedy, Michelle Rejwan, Deborah Chow, Ewan McGregor, and Joby Harold | Nominated | |
| Saturn Awards | 2022 | Best Limited Event Series (Streaming) | Obi-Wan Kenobi | Won | |
| Saturn Awards | 2022 | Best Actor in a Streaming Series | Ewan McGregor | Nominated | |
| Saturn Awards | 2022 | Best Supporting Actress in a Streaming Series | Moses Ingram | Won | |
| Saturn Awards | 2022 | Best Performance by a Younger Actor (Streaming) | Vivien Lyra Blair | Nominated | |
| Saturn Awards | 2022 | Best Guest Performance in a Streaming Series | Hayden Christensen | Won | |
| Set Decorators Society of America Awards | 2022 | Best Achievement in Décor/Design of a Television Movie or Limited Series | Jan Pascale, Todd Cherniawsky, and Doug Chiang | Won | |

By May 2022, Disney and Lucasfilm had decided not to submit the series for consideration at the 74th Primetime Emmy Awards because to meet the Academy of Television Arts & Sciences's criteria they would have to make all of the series' episodes available to Academy voters by June 15, 2022, which would require the final two episodes of the series to be released early.

=== Moses Ingram casting controversy ===
For her role as Reva Sevander, Moses Ingram said she received hundreds of direct messages on Instagram containing death threats and racist abuse which she revealed examples of on May 31, 2022. This prompted Disney and her colleagues, including Ewan McGregor, to defend her. McGregor, in a video posted to the official Star Wars social media accounts, called the abusive messages "horrendous" and said that "if you're sending her bullying messages, you're no Star Wars fan in my mind". Ingram went on to win a Saturn Award for her performance as Reva.

== Documentary special ==
In August 2022, Disney announced the documentary special Obi-Wan Kenobi: A Jedi's Return which premiered on September 8, 2022, Disney+ Day. The documentary explores the making of the series, and the returns of Obi-Wan Kenobi and Anakin Skywalker.

== Comic miniseries ==
In June 2023, StarWars.com announced that the comic miniseries Star Wars: Obi-Wan Kenobi would adapt the series and was written by Jody Houser and published by Marvel Comics. The series began in September 2023.
