= Hannah Friedman =

American writer, producer, musician and director

- Born: Hannah Friedman; New York City, New York, U.S.
- Education: Yale University
- Occupations: Writer; director; producer; musician
- Writing career
- Period: 2004–present
- Genres: Non-fiction, young adult fiction
- Website: www.hannahfriedman.com

Hannah Friedman is an American writer, producer, musician and director.

She has worked in film and television as a writer and producer. Her writing has also appeared in Newsweek and Cosmopolitan. Her memoir, Everything Sucks, was published in 2009.

Friedman has worked as a feature writer with the Pixar Braintrust and at Disney Feature Animation. She has served as a co-executive producer of Willow on Disney+.

== Early life and education ==
Friedman was born in New York City. She is the elder of two children born to singer-songwriter Dean Friedman. Hannah's mother trained monkeys. While in this job, she adopted a capuchin monkey named Amelia, who has lived with the family for almost thirty years.

Friedman studied theater at Yale University.

== Articles and books ==
In 2004 Friedman's article When Your Friends Become The Enemy was published in Newsweek Magazine. It described the difficulties of the college application process. She is among the youngest contributors to have been published in the magazine.

Friedman's debut book, Everything Sucks, was a teen memoir released by HCI Books in August 2009. Everything Sucks was reviewed on Salon.com, concluding, "Not only is Friedman's writing striking for its blunt, unromantic realism; her prose also displays a self-aware wit that is all too rare in the genre".

== Performance ==
Friedman has made appearances on Comedy Central's This Is Not Happening (2016), Don’t Tell My Mother! (2016), The Moth (2017), Wet Hot American Summer: First Day Of Camp (2015) and I Do... Until I Don't (2017).

== Musical career ==
Friedman is a musician and lyricist. She was a writer and co-composer with Benj Pasek, Mark Sonnenblick and Shaina Taub for StoryCourse's Saturday Night Seder.

Friedman wrote the script for My Silent Night, a musical, which premiered at the Salzburg State Theatre in 2018, a project with composer John Debney and songwriter Siedah Garrett.

In October 2009, Friedman was asked to perform at the 35th Anniversary Celebration of the National Coalition Against Censorship, a charity benefit gala hosted by Judy Blume. Friedman wrote and performed an original comedy song called "Party Like It's 1984".
