= Chung Chung-hoon =

South Korean cinematographer

- 정정훈
- Born: June 15, 1970 (age 56); Seoul, South Korea
- Other name: Jeong Jeong-hoon
- Occupations: Cinematographer; film editor
- Years active: 1996–present

Korean name
- Hangul: 정정훈
- Hanja: 丁正勳
- RR: Jeong Jeonghun
- MR: Chŏng Chŏnghun

Chung Chung-hoon, ASC (born June 15, 1970) is a South Korean cinematographer.

== Early life ==
Chung was born in Seoul, South Korea. He attended Dongguk University in 1990, initially majoring in theater, and later switched his focus to cinematography. While attending Dongguk University, he directed three short films. During his senior year, he made his debut as cinematographer on a feature called Yuri.

Chung debuted in the US as cinematographer in the film Stoker.

In 2017, Chung was invited to join the Academy of Motion Picture Arts and Sciences (AMPAS).

Chung was invited to join the American Society of Cinematographers as a member in October 2023, becoming the first and the only Korean cinematographer of the ASC. Chung is currently under the United Talent Agency.

== Filmography ==
=== Film ===
Year	Title	Director	Notes
1996	Yuri	Yang Yun-ho	
2000	The Record	Gi-hun Kim; Jong-seok Kim	
2001	Gohoe	Jeong-jin Kim	
2003	Oldboy	Park Chan-wook	
2005	Antarctic Journal	Yim Pil-sung	
2005	Lady Vengeance	Park Chan-wook	
2006	Dasepo Naughty Girls	E J-yong	
2006	I'm a Cyborg, But That's OK	Park Chan-wook	
2009	Thirst	Park Chan-wook	
2010	Blades of Blood	Lee Joon-ik	
2010	The Unjust	Ryoo Seung-wan	
2011	Battlefield Heroes	Lee Joon-ik	
2013	Stoker	Park Chan-wook	
2013	New World	Park Hoon-jung	With Eok Yu
2014	Boulevard	Dito Montiel	
2015	Me and Earl and the Dying Girl	Alfonso Gomez-Rejon	
2016	The Handmaiden	Park Chan-wook	
2017	It	Andy Muschietti	
2017	The Current War	Alfonso Gomez-Rejon	
2018	Hotel Artemis	Drew Pearce	
2019	Zombieland: Double Tap	Ruben Fleischer	
2019	Earthquake Bird	Wash Westmoreland	
2021	Last Night in Soho	Edgar Wright	
2022	Uncharted	Ruben Fleischer	
2023	Wonka	Paul King	
2024	The Greatest Hits	Ned Benson	
2024	Heretic	Scott Beck; Bryan Woods	
2025	The Running Man	Edgar Wright	
2027	The Nightingale †	Michael Morris	Post-production

=== Television ===
Year	Title	Director	Notes
2018	White City	Stephen Gaghan	TV movie
2022	Obi-Wan Kenobi	Deborah Chow	Miniseries

=== Music video ===
Year	Title	Artist	Ref
2016	"Everything You've Come to Expect"	The Last Shadow Puppets	
2016	"Aviation"	The Last Shadow Puppets	

== Awards and nominations ==
Year	Award	Category	Recipient(s)	Result	Ref.
2003	Grand Bell Awards	Best Cinematography	Old Boy	Nominated	
2003	Korean Film Awards	Best Cinematography	Old Boy	Nominated	
2016	Austin Film Critics Association	Best Cinematography	The Handmaiden	Nominated	
2016	Blue Dragon Film Awards	Best Cinematography	The Handmaiden	Nominated	
2016	Boston Society of Film Critics	Best Cinematography	The Handmaiden	Won	
2016	Buil Film Awards	Best Cinematography	The Handmaiden	Nominated	
2016	Chicago Film Critics Association	Best Cinematography	The Handmaiden	Nominated	
2016	Florida Film Critics Circle	Best Cinematography	The Handmaiden	Runner-up	
2017	Apolo Awards	Best Cinematography	The Handmaiden	Nominated	
