= StageCraft =

Visual effects technology designed by Industrial Light & Magic

StageCraft is an on-set virtual production visual effects technology composed of a video wall designed by Industrial Light & Magic (ILM) for the Disney+ series The Mandalorian. It has since been used in other productions. The soundstage in which StageCraft is implemented is called The Volume.

== History ==
Filming of the tornado sequence from Steven Spielberg's The Fabelmans (2022) on the StageCraft Volume at Manhattan Beach Studios (top) and the finished scene (below).

While shooting the film Rogue One (2016), cinematographer Greig Fraser encountered multiple issues which inspired the idea to use large LED screens as a component of the set. This idea was further developed by a team including Industrial Light & Magic's (ILM) Richard Bluff and Rob Bredow, as well as Kim Libreri of Epic Games. During the development of The Lion King (2019), director Jon Favreau worked with ILM to develop technologies in order to better visualize shots within a CGI space. When Favreau began work on the Disney+ series The Mandalorian, ILM found a perfect opportunity to use the technology with a director prepared to use it.

The StageCraft process involves shooting live-action actors and sets surrounded by large, very high-definition LED video walls. These walls display computer-generated imagery backdrops, once traditionally composited primarily in post-production after shooting with chroma key screens. These facilities are known as "volumes". When shooting, the production team is able to realign the background instantly based on moving camera positions. The entire CGI background can be manipulated in real-time.

ILM used Epic Games' Unreal Engine, a popular game engine, to handle real-time 3-D rendering of computer-generated imagery environments. Other technology partners in StageCraft include FuseFX, Lux Machina, Profile Studios, Nvidia, and ARRI.

ILM iterated the technology to "StageCraft 2.0" for the second season of The Mandalorian. This version featured a larger volume as well as more specialized software. One example of this software is Helios, a rendering engine designed by ILM specifically for StageCraft hardware.

In September 2020, it was announced that a second permanent volume was being created at Manhattan Beach Studios in Los Angeles, in addition to the first built for The Mandalorian, which was expected to be completed in March 2021; one at Pinewood Studios in London, to open in February 2021; and a larger, custom one at Fox Studios Australia. These new volumes would be larger, use more LED panels, and offer higher resolution than the original Manhattan Beach one. ILM also has the ability to provide "pop up" virtual production configurations in other locations. A volume was announced to be built in Vancouver in November 2021, and was planned to be opened in early 2022.

== Productions using StageCraft ==
=== Television series ===
- The Mandalorian (2019–present)
- The Book of Boba Fett (2021)
- How I Met Your Father (2022–2023)
- Our Flag Means Death (2022–2023)
- Obi-Wan Kenobi (2022)
- Star Trek: Strange New Worlds (2022–present)
- Andor (2022-2025)
- House of the Dragon (2022)
- Ahsoka (2023)
- Percy Jackson and the Olympians (2023–present)
- Avatar: The Last Airbender (2024–present)
- Doctor Who series 14 (2024-present)
- Star Wars: Skeleton Crew (2024)

=== Feature films ===
- In Vacanza su Marte (2020)
- The Midnight Sky (2020)
- The Batman (2022)
- Thor: Love and Thunder (2022)
- Black Adam (2022)
- The Fabelmans (2022)
- Ant-Man and the Wasp: Quantumania (2023)
- The Creator (2023)
- The Marvels (2023)
- Daddio (2024)
- Transformers One (2024)
- A Big Bold Beautiful Journey (2025)
- The Lost Bus (2025)
- Tron: Ares (2025)
- The Mandalorian and Grogu (2026)

== See also ==
- Prysm Stage, a virtual production volume at Trilith Studios built in collaboration with NEP Virtual Studios
