= Moses Ingram =

American actress

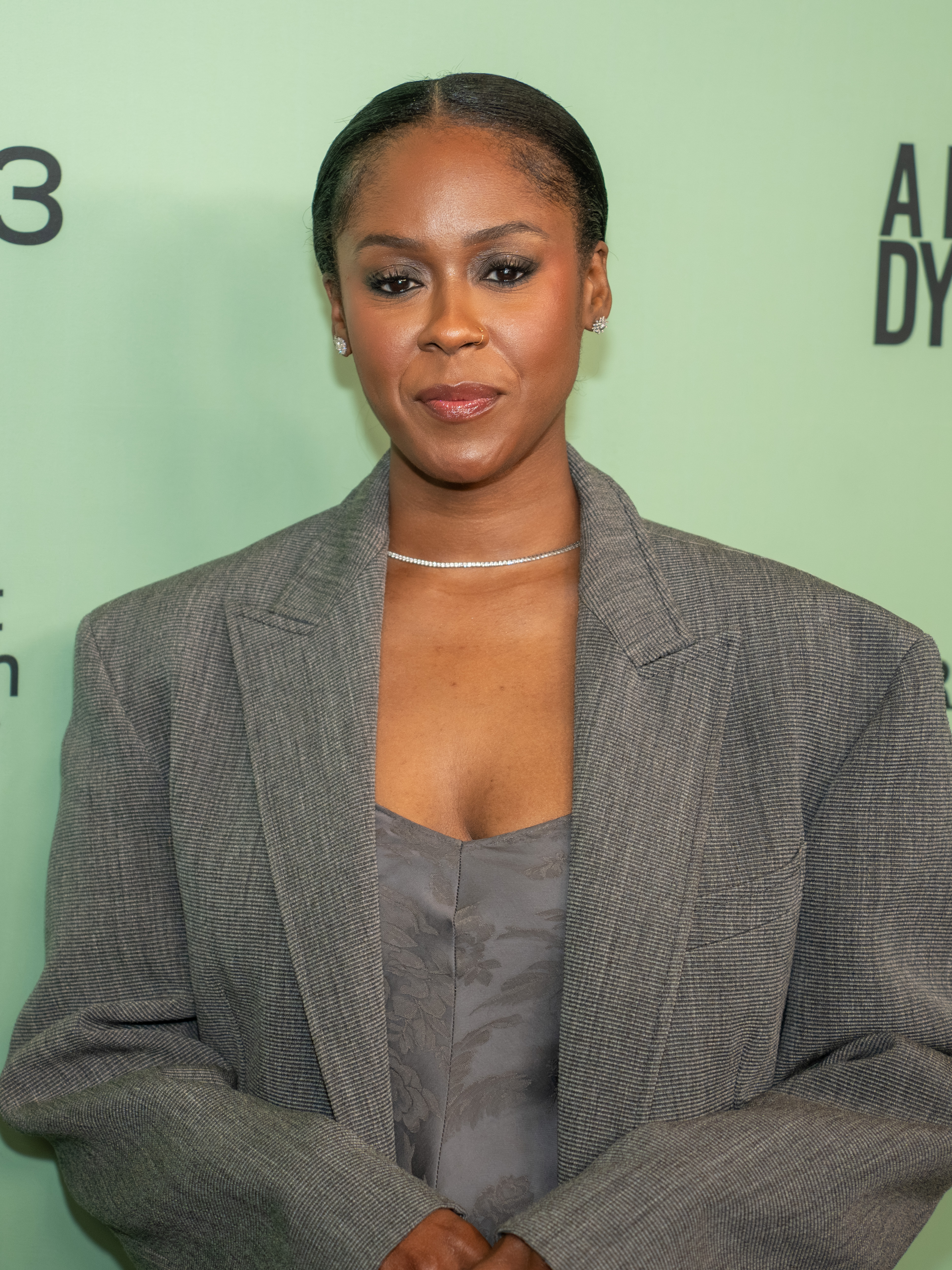
- Ingram at the 2025 New York Film Festival
- Born: February 6, 1994 (age 32); Baltimore, Maryland, U.S.
- Education: Baltimore City Community College (AA); Yale University (MFA)
- Occupation: Actress
- Years active: 2017–present

Moses Ingram (born February 6, 1994) is an American actress. She is best known for her role as Jolene in the Netflix miniseries The Queen's Gambit (2020). For this role, she was nominated for the Primetime Emmy Award for Outstanding Supporting Actress in a Limited or Anthology Series or Movie. She is also known for her role as Reva Sevander/the Third Sister in the Disney+ miniseries Obi-Wan Kenobi (2022).

== Early life and education ==
Ingram was born on February 6, 1994 in Baltimore in a blended family of six children; her mother worked in childcare and her stepfather worked in city operations. When Ingram was 10 years old, her mother and a teacher at Windsor Hills Elementary enrolled her in an after-school theater program. She later attended the Baltimore School for the Arts, graduating in 2012.

Due to financial limitations, Ingram declined an offer to attend Howard University and enrolled at Baltimore City Community College in 2012. Although Baltimore City did not have a drama program, she was encouraged by her advisor to continue acting and audition for local plays. She also took on multiple part-time jobs and scholarships to fund her schooling. She graduated with an associate degree.

In 2015, she won a regional competition from the National Society of Arts and Letters, and finished fourth in the nationals. The winner of that competition, Jonathan Majors, encouraged her to audition for the Yale School of Drama. She was accepted with scholarship support and enrolled in the fall of 2016.

Before starting Yale, she renamed herself Moses, after the biblical figure. "So when we got to school [Yale] they wanted us to register our names because this is the first time they would be publicized so people can see them. And before I got to Yale, I had had such a time just trying to make things work that my name just didn't feel suited. So I prayed and asked God, 'What is it? I know it's not my name now, but it is something.' And a few days later, I just heard Moses in my head and that was it."

She received a Princess Grace Award in 2018. In her final year at Yale, Ingram received rave reviews for her lead performance as Viola in an Afrocentric version of William Shakespeare's Twelfth Night. She graduated with her Master of Fine Arts in June 2019.

== Career ==
A month after commencement, she auditioned in New York City for a role in The Queen's Gambit and landed the role of Jolene, who is Beth's friend from the orphanage in the series. For her role, she was nominated for the Primetime Emmy Award for Outstanding Supporting Actress in a Limited or Anthology Series or Movie.

Ingram next appeared in Peter Hedges' ensemble drama The Same Storm and as Lady Macduff in Joel Coen's The Tragedy of Macbeth, which premiered at the New York Film Festival in September 2021. In 2022, she appeared in Michael Bay's Ambulance. Noting her Emmy nomination and these roles, Variety named her one of ten actors to watch for 2021.

Ingram appeared in the Disney+ Star Wars spin-off miniseries Obi-Wan Kenobi as Reva Sevander / the Third Sister, an Inquisitor who works to hunt down surviving Jedi after Order 66. For her role as Reva Sevander in that series, Ingram received hundreds of direct messages on Instagram containing death threats and racist abuse which she revealed examples of on May 31, 2022. This prompted Disney and her colleagues, including Ewan McGregor, to defend her. McGregor, in a video posted to the official Star Wars social media accounts, called the abusive messages "horrendous" and said that "if you’re sending her bullying messages, you’re no Star Wars fan in my mind". For her performance in the miniseries, she received the Saturn Award for Best Supporting Actress in a Streaming Television Series.

She next appeared in two Apple TV+ miniseries: Lady in the Lake opposite Natalie Portman, and The Big Cigar, starring André Holland. In March 2023, she joined the cast of Joshua Oppenheimer's The End.

In 2025, Ingram appeared in Rachel Sennott's I Love LA for HBO.

== Filmography ==
Key
†	Denotes films that have not yet been released

=== Film ===
Year	Title	Role	Notes
2021	The Tragedy of Macbeth	Lady Macduff	
2021	The Same Storm	Audre Robinson	
2022	Ambulance	Amy Sharp	
2023	All Dirt Roads Taste of Salt	Josie	
2024	The End	Girl	
2025	A House of Dynamite	Cathy Rogers	

=== Television ===
Year	Title	Role	Notes
2020	The Queen's Gambit	Jolene	Miniseries, 4 episodes Nominated—Primetime Emmy Award for Outstanding Supporting Actress in a Limited or Anthology Series or Movie
2022	Obi-Wan Kenobi	Reva Sevander/ Third Sister	Miniseries, 6 episodes Black Reel Award for Outstanding Supporting Actress, TV Movie or Limited Series; Saturn Award for Best Supporting Actress in a Streaming Series; Nominated—Critics' Choice Super Award for Best Actress in a Science Fiction/Fantasy Series
2024	The Big Cigar	Terresa Dixon	Miniseries, 5 episodes
2024	Lady in the Lake	Cleo Sherwood	Miniseries, 7 episodes
2025–present	I Love LA	Tessa	Recurring role, 4 episodes

=== Theatre ===
Year	Title	Role	Venue
2017	Sweat	Cynthia	Iseman Theatre, Yale
2019	Twelfth Night	Viola	Yale Repertory Theatre
