= Michelle Rejwan =

American film producer and business executive

- Born: March 8, 1982 (age 44)
- Education: Columbia University
- Occupation: Producer
- Employer: Lucasfilm
- Title: Senior Vice-President of Live Action Development and Production

Michelle Rejwan (born March 8, 1982) is an American film producer. She produced the Star Wars film The Rise of Skywalker, alongside Kathleen Kennedy and J. J. Abrams.

== Biography ==
Rejwan went to University of California, Los Angeles for a year, transferred to University of Southern California, before deciding to take a leave of absence. She got a job as assistant to Allison Jones. She later became an assistant to Jeff Garlin. After a stint in the film industry, Rejwan returned to school and graduated from Columbia University School of General Studies in 2008.

After Columbia, Rejwan landed a job as J. J. Abrams' assistant and rose to associate producer on Super 8 and co-produced Star Wars: The Force Awakens and Star Wars: The Rise of Skywalker. In 2019, she was named Senior Vice President of Live Action Development and Production of Lucasfilm, where she has been a member of the Star Wars "brain trust" since 2015. Rejwan served as executive producer for the Disney+ series Obi-Wan Kenobi, Andor, and Willow.

In October 2022, it was reported that Rejwan had stepped down from her role of Senior Vice President for Live Action Development & Production at Lucasfilm, though she was not leaving Lucasfilm entirely. Rejwan remains at Lucasfilm in a full-time producer capacity.

== Filmography ==
=== Film ===
Year	Title	Producer	Executive Producer	Notes	Ref.
2011	Super 8	Associate	No		
2013	Star Trek: Secrets of the Universe	No	Yes	TV documentary movie	
2013	Star Trek Into Darkness	Co-producer	No		
2015	Star Wars: Episode VII - The Force Awakens	Co-producer	No		
2018	Monster Challenge	No	Yes	Short film	
2019	Star Wars: Episode IX - The Rise of Skywalker	Yes	No		

=== Streaming series ===
Year(s)	Title	Executive Producer	Ref.
2022	Obi-Wan Kenobi	Yes	
2022-2023	Willow	Yes	
2022-2025	Light & Magic	Yes	
2022-2025	Andor	Yes	
