= List of Star Wars reference books =

Star Wars is an American epic space-opera media franchise, centered on a film series created by George Lucas. This is a list of the many reference books that have been published to accompany the films, television series, and the Expanded Universe of books, comics and video games.

== Reference books ==
=== A Guide to the Star Wars Universe ===
- A Guide to the Star Wars Universe compiled by Raymond L. Velasco
- A Guide to the Star Wars Universe, 2nd Edition compiled by Bill Slavicsek
- A Guide to the Star Wars Universe, 3rd Edition compiled by Bill Slavicsek

=== Visual Dictionaries ===
The visual dictionary series is a series of reference books based on photographs (usually taken from films or TV productions or shot at the unused props) about characters and elements from Star Wars media. They are published by DK Publishing.
Note: The updates of the books are listed right below them.

- Star Wars: The Visual Dictionary (1998), by David West Reynolds
- Star Wars: Episode I The Visual Dictionary (1999), by David West Reynolds
  - Star Wars: The Phantom Menace: The Expanded Visual Dictionary (2012), by David West Reynolds and Jason Fry
- Star Wars: Attack of the Clones The Visual Dictionary (2002), by David West Reynolds
  - Star Wars: Attack of the Clones: The Ultimate Illustrated Guide (2013), by Jason Fry
- Star Wars: Revenge of the Sith The Visual Dictionary (2005), by James Luceno
  - Revenge of the Sith: The Expanded Visual Dictionary (canceled in 2013, planned for 2016)
- Star Wars: The Ultimate Visual Guide (2005), by Ryder Windham
  - Star Wars: The Ultimate Visual Guide: Special Edition (2007), by Ryder Windham and Daniel Wallace
  - Star Wars: The Ultimate Visual Guide: Updated and Expanded (2012), by Ryder Windham and Daniel Wallace (additional material)
- Star Wars: The Complete Visual Dictionary (2006), by David West Reynolds, James Luceno and Ryder Windham
  - Star Wars: The Complete Visual Dictionary, New Edition (2018), by Pablo Hidalgo and David West Reynolds
- Star Wars: The Clone Wars: The Visual Guide (2008), by Jason Fry and Heather Scott
  - Star Wars: The Clone Wars: The Visual Guide: Ultimate Battles (2009), by Jason Fry
  - Star Wars: The Clone Wars: New Battlefronts: The Visual Guide (2010), by Jason Fry
- LEGO Star Wars: The Visual Dictionary (2009; including a limited-edition yellow-faced Lego minifigure of Luke Skywalker during the ceremony after the Battle of Yavin), by Simon Beecroft
  - LEGO Star Wars: The Visual Dictionary: Updated and Expanded (2014; including a limited-edition yellow-faced Lego minifigure of Luke Skywalker in his Tatooine outfit)
- Star Wars Rebels: The Visual Guide (2014), by Adam Bray
  - Star Wars Rebels: Visual Guide: Epic Battles (2015; originally titled "Star Wars Rebels: The Epic Battle: The Visual Guide")
- Star Wars: The Force Awakens: The Visual Dictionary (2015), by Pablo Hidalgo
- Star Wars: Rogue One: The Ultimate Visual Guide (2016; also available with a special edition cover), by Pablo Hidalgo
- Star Wars: The Visual Encyclopedia (2017), by Adam Bray, Cole Horton and Tricia Barr
- Star Wars: The Last Jedi: The Visual Dictionary (2017), by Pablo Hidalgo
- Solo: A Star Wars Story The Official Guide (2018), by Pablo Hidalgo
- Star Wars: The Rise of Skywalker: The Visual Dictionary (2019), by Pablo Hidalgo

=== Essential Guides ===
The essential guides are more adult-oriented and descriptive than the Visual Dictionaries. They are published by Del Rey.

==== First Generation ====
The first generation of books (except for to Alien Species and, possibly, to Episode I) had covers with cartoon-like illustrations of the subjects and was known to use non-specific terms. They are listed below. It included data about the prequel trilogy only since The Essential Chronology.
Note: The second book was known for a number of picture errors, such as confusing the Imperial and Victory classes of Star Destroyer.

- The Essential Guide to Characters (1995), by Andy Mangels
- The Essential Guide to Vehicles and Vessels (1996), by Bill Smith
- The Essential Guide to Weapons and Technology (1997), by Bill Smith
- The Essential Guide to Planets and Moons (1998), by Daniel Wallace
- The Essential Guide to Droids (1999), by Daniel Wallace
- The Essential Chronology (2000), by Bill Hughes
- The Essential Guide to Alien Species (2001), by Ann Margaret Lewis
- The Essential Guide to Episode I (renamed "The Ultimate Guide to Episode I" and later canceled), never written

==== Second Generation (New) ====
The second generation of books had covers with the standard Star Wars logo, stills from the films (or artwork based on them) and with the word "New" evidenced in the title. They are listed below. It included data about Episode III only since The New Essential Chronology.

- The New Essential Guide to Characters (2002), by Daniel Wallace.
- The New Essential Guide to Vehicles and Vessels (2003; stylized as "The New Essential Guide to Vehicles & Vessels), by W. Haden Blackman
- The New Essential Guide to Weapons and Technology (2004, hardcover edition published in 2014; stylized as "The New Essential Guide to Weapons & Technology"), by W. Haden Blackman
- The New Essential Chronology (2005), by Daniel Wallace and Kevin J. Anderson
- The New Essential Guide to Droids (2006, eBook edition published in 2013 and hardcover edition published in 2014), by Daniel Wallace
- The New Essential Guide to Alien Species (2006), by Ann Margaret Lewis and Helen Keier

==== Third Generation ====
The third generation of books had new covers featuring specific artwork and title characters. They are listed below. It included data about almost every Legends piece of media.

- Jedi vs. Sith: The Essential Guide to the Force (2007), by Ryder Windham
- The Essential Atlas (2009), by Jason Fry and Daniel Wallace
- The Essential Guide to Warfare (2012; also available in eBook format), by Jason Fry and Paul R. Urquhart
- The Essential Reader's Companion (2012; also available in eBook format), by Pablo Hidalgo
- The Essential Characters (canceled, release planned for 2016), by Daniel Wallace

==== Related ====
- Monsters and Aliens from George Lucas (1993) by Bob Carrau
- Galactic Phrase Book & Travel Guide (2001; also known as "Galactic Phrase Book and Travel Guide: Beeps, Bleats, Boskas, and Other Common Intergalactic Verbiage"), by Ben Burtt

==== In-Universe ====
Some of the essential guides have also an in-universe counterpart, as they are written from an in-universe perspective. They are listed below, among with their fictional release dates and authors.

- The Essential Guide to Alien Species, by Mammon Hole
  - The New Essential Guide to Alien Species, by Mammon Hole
- Galactic Phrase Book & Travel Guide (6 ABY), by Ebenn Q3 Baobab
- The New Essential Chronology (36 ABY), by Voren Na'al
- Jedi vs. Sith: The Essential Guide to the Force (40 ABY), by Tionne Solusar

=== The Making of Star Wars ===
The Making of Star Wars is a series of reference books about the so-called "making of" of the films and the video games of the franchise. They are published by various publishers, including notable names.
Note: The refurbishments of the three original trilogy books are listed right below them.

- Star Wars: The Making of the Movie (1980), by Larry Weinberg
  - The Making of Star Wars: The Definitive Story Behind the Original Film (2007; available with 372 or 324 pages), by J. W. Rinzler and Peter Jackson (foreword)
- Once Upon A Galaxy: The Journal of the Making of The Empire Strikes Back (1980), by Alan Arnold
  - The Making of Star Wars: The Empire Strikes Back (2010), by Jonathan W. Rinzler
- The Making of Star Wars: Return of the Jedi (1983), by John Phillip Peecher
  - The Making of Return of the Jedi (2013), by J. W. Rinzler and Brad Bird (forward)
- The Making of Star Wars, Episode I, The Phantom Menace (1999), by Laurent Bouzereau and Jody Duncan
- Mythmaking: Behind the Scenes of Star Wars: Episode II: Attack of the Clones (2002), by Jody Duncan
- The Making of Star Wars Revenge of the Sith (2005), by J. W. Rinzler
- The Art and Making of Star Wars: The Force Unleashed (2008; originally titled "Star Wars: The Force Unleashed: Art of the Game") by W. Haden Blackman and Brett Rector
- The Making of Star Wars: The Force Awakens (2015), by Jonathan W. Rinzler, Mark Cotta Vaz, J. J. Abrams (preface) and Kathleen Kennedy (forward)

=== The Art of Star Wars ===
The Art of Star Wars is a series of reference books based on paintings and artwork (mainly concept art). They are published by DK Publishing.

- The Art of Star Wars (1979; known by 1994 as "The Art of Star Wars Episode IV: A New Hope"), edited by Carol Titelman
- The Art of The Empire Strikes Back (1980; known by 1994 as "The Art of Star Wars Episode V: The Empire Strikes Back"), by Vic Bulluck and Valerie Hoffman
- The Art of Return of the Jedi (1983; known by 1994 as "The Art of Star Wars Episode VI: Return of the Jedi), by Carol Titelman
- The Art of the Star Wars Trilogy Special Edition (1997)
- The Art of Star Wars Episode I: The Phantom Menace (1999), by Jonathan Bresman
- The Art of Star Wars Episode II: Attack of the Clones (2002), by Mark Cotta Vaz
- The Art of Star Wars Episode III: Revenge of the Sith (2005), by Jonathan W. Rinzler
- The Art of Star Wars: The Clone Wars (2009; 288-page book covering the film and the first season of the TV series), by Frank Parisi and Gary Scheppke
  - The Art of Star Wars: The Clone Wars (2013; 54-page booklet released and sold together with the 14-DVD or 19-Blu-ray Disc Star Wars: The Clone Wars Seasons 1-5 Collector's Edition)
- The Art of Star Wars: The Force Awakens (2015) by Phil Szostak
- The Art of Rogue One: A Star Wars Story (2016) by Josh Kushins
- The Art of Star Wars: The Last Jedi (2017), by Phil Szostak
- The Art of Solo: A Star Wars Story (2018), by Phil Szostak
- The Art of Star Wars Rebels (2019), by Daniel Wallace.
- The Art of Star Wars: The Rise of Skywalker (2020), by Phil Szostak
- The Art of Star Wars: The Mandalorian (Season One) (2020), by Phil Szostak
- The Art of Star Wars: The Mandalorian (Season Two) (2022), by Phil Szostak

=== Incredible Cross-Sections ===
The Incredible Cross-Sections books are a series of reference books focusing on cross-sections of buildings and vehicles. They are published by DK Publishing.

- Star Wars: Incredible Cross-Sections (1998), by David West Reynolds
  - Star Wars: Complete Cross-Sections (2007), by David West Reynolds and Curtis Saxton
  - Star Wars: Complete Vehicles (2013; mainly a collection of the contents of the 1998, 1999, 2002 and 2003 volumes), by Kerrie Dougherty, Curtis Saxton, David West Reynolds, Ryder Windham
- Star Wars: Episode I Incredible Cross-Sections (1999), by David West Reynolds
- Star Wars: Attack of the Clones Incredible Cross-Sections (2002), by Curtis Saxton
- Star Wars: Revenge of the Sith Incredible Cross-Sections (2005), by Curtis Saxton
- Star Wars: The Clone Wars: Incredible Vehicles (2011), by Jason Fry
- Star Wars: The Force Awakens: Incredible Cross-Sections (2015), by Kemp Remillard and Jason Fry
- Star Wars: The Last Jedi: Incredible Cross-Sections (2017), by Jason Fry

=== Inside the Worlds of ===
The Inside the Worlds of books are a series of reference books focusing on accurate cross-sections of buildings featured in the films. They are published by DK Publishing.

- Inside the Worlds of Star Wars: Episode I (2000), by Kristin Lund
- Inside the Worlds of Star Wars: Attack of the Clones (2003), by Simon Beecroft and Curtis Saxon
- Inside the Worlds of Star Wars Trilogy (2004), by James Luceno
- Star Wars: Complete Locations (2005; also known as "Star Wars: Complete Locations — Inside the Worlds of Episode I to VI"; Legends edition compiling the above, including material from the never-published volume for Revenge of the Sith)
- Star Wars: Complete Locations (2016; canon edition compiling the above and adding Episode VII data by Jason Fry)
- Star Wars: Complete Locations (2025; canon edition compiling the above and adding Rogue One, Episode VIII, Solo, Episode XI and The Mandalorian data by Jason Fry)

==== Related ====
- Indiana Jones: The Ultimate Guide (2008), by James Luceno

=== The Official Star Wars Technical Journal ===
The Official Star Wars Technical Journal was a 3-volume reference publication about organizations and places in the Star Wars universe. It was published by Starlog Communications International, Inc.

- Star Wars Technical Journal of Planet Tatooine (1993, Special Edition released in 1996; also known as "Star Wars Technical Journal Vol. 1"), by Shane Johnson
- Star Wars Technical Journal of the Imperial Forces (1994, Special Edition released in 1996; also known as "Star Wars Technical Journal Vol. 2"), by Shane Johnson
- Star Wars Technical Journal of the Rebel Forces (1994, Special Edition released in 1996; also known as "Star Wars Technical Journal Vol. 3"), by Shane Johnson
- Star Wars Technical Journal (1995; compiling the above)
- Star Wars Technical Journal Collector's Edition (1996; UK-market version), by Shane Johnson

=== Ultimate Star Wars ===
- Ultimate Star Wars- Reference book containing characters, vehicles, weapons, locations and technology. Includes content from seasons 1-6 of Star Wars: The Clone Wars, season 1 of Star Wars Rebels, Films 1-6, The Clone Wars film and some comics. Published in 2015.
- Ultimate Star Wars: New Edition- Reference book containing expanded characters, vehicles, weapons, locations and technology. Includes content from seasons 1-7 of Star Wars: The Clone Wars, seasons 1-4 of Star Wars: Rebels, season 1 of Star Wars Resistance, films 1-9 of the Skywalker Saga, Star Wars: Battlefront II, the Star Wars Anthology films, and some comics. Published in 2019.
- Star Wars Encyclopedia: The Comprehensive Guide to the Star Wars Galaxy- Reference book containing more expanded characters, vehicles, weapons, locations and technology. Includes content from seasons 1-7 of Star Wars: The Clone Wars, seasons 1-4 of Star Wars: Rebels, seasons 1-2 of Star Wars: Resistance, seasons 1-2 of Star Wars: The Bad Batch, seasons 1 of Tales of the Jedi, seasons 1-3 of The Mandalorian, The Book of Boba Fett, Obi-Wan Kenobi, season 1 of Andor, season 1 of Ahsoka, Star Wars: Young Jedi Adventures, films 1-9 of the Skywalker Saga, Star Wars: Battlefront II, the Star Wars Anthology films, and some comics. Published in 2024.

=== Miscellaneous reference works ===
- Star Wars: The Complete Scripts (1995), by George Lucas, Leigh Brackett, and Lawrence Kasdan (ISBN 0752207660/ISBN 978-0752207667)
- Creating the Worlds of Star Wars: 365 Days (2005), by John Knoll
- Dressing a Galaxy: The Costumes of Star Wars (2005), by Trish Biggar
- From Star Wars to Indiana Jones: The Best of the Lucasfilm Archives (1994), by Mark Cotta
- How Star Wars Conquered the Universe: The Past, Present, and Future of a Multibillion Dollar Franchise (2014), by Chris Taylor (ISBN 1480532525)
- The Illustrated Star Wars Universe by Kevin J. Anderson and Ralph McQuarrie
- Sculpting a Galaxy by Lorne Peterson
- The Secrets of Star Wars: Shadows of the Empire by Mark Vaz
- Star Wars: The Action Figure Archive by Stephen J. Sansweet
- Star Wars Chronicles by Deborah Fine
- Star Wars Chronicles: The Prequels by Stephen J. Sansweet
- Star Wars Comics Companion by Ryder Windham and Daniel Wallace
- Star Wars Encyclopedia by Stephen J. Sansweet
- Star Wars Scrapbook: The Essential Collection by Stephen J. Sansweet
- Star Wars: From Concept to Screen to Collectible by Stephen J. Sansweet
- Star Wars: The Magic of Myth by Mary Henderson (A commentary on how Star Wars draws on classical mythology and an overview of the Star Wars exhibit at the Smithsonian's National Air and Space Museum; author Mary Henderson was the curator of the exhibit)
- Star Wars Poster Book by Stephen J. Sansweet
- Star Wars: The Power of Myth
- The Star Wars Vault (2007), by Stephen J. Sansweet
- Star Wars: A Pop-Up Guide to the Galaxy by Matthew Reinhart
- The Empire Strikes Back Notebook edited by Diana Attias and Lindsay Smith
- The Quotable Star Wars compiled by Stephen J. Sansweet
- Star Wars Character Encyclopedia by Simon Beecroft
- Star Wars Encyclopedia of Starfighters and Other Vehicles by Landry Q. Walker
- Star Wars: Absolutely Everything You Need to Know (2015) by Adam Bray, Cole Horton, Michael Kogge, and Kerrie Dougherty
- Star Wars: The Force Awakens: Box Set (2016)
- Star Wars: Rey's Survival Guide (2015) by Jason Fry
- Star Wars: Poe Dameron: Flight Log (2016) by Michael Kogge
- Star Wars: Aliens and Ships of the Galaxy (2016) by Jason Fry and Benjamin Harper
- The Star Wars Book: Expand Your Knowledge of a Galaxy Far, Far Away (2020) by Cole Horton, Pablo Hidalgo, and Dan Zehr
- Star Wars: The Rise and Fall of the Galactic Empire (2024) by Dr. Chris Kempshall

==== Essays and commentary ====
- Empire Building: The Remarkable Real Life Story of Star Wars (1997), by Garry Jenkins
- A Galaxy Not So Far Away: Writers and Artists on 25 Years of Star Wars (2002), by Glenn Kenny, editor.
- Sword Fighting in the Star Wars Universe (2008), by Nick Jamilla.
- Star Wars and History (2012), by Janice Liedl, editor and Nancy R. Regain, editor.

== Roleplaying gamebooks ==
=== Saga edition ===
- Star Wars Roleplaying Game: Saga Edition
- Starships of the Galaxy (Saga Edition)
- Star Wars Gamemaster Screen
- Threats of the Galaxy
- Knights of the Old Republic Campaign Guide
- Force Unleashed Campaign Guide
- Scum and Villainy
- The Clone Wars Campaign Guide
- Legacy Era Campaign Guide
- Jedi Academy Training Manual
- Rebellion Era Campaign Guide
- Galaxy At War
- Scavenger's Guide to Droids
- Galaxy of Intrigue
- The Unknown Regions

==== Previous editions ====
- Star Wars: The Roleplaying Game, 1st Ed. 1987, West End Games (1987), by Greg Costikyan - Game designer and various others
- Star Wars: Sourcebook, 1st Ed. 1987, West End Games (1987), by Bill Slavicsek & Curtis Smith
- Star Wars: The Dark Side Sourcebook, (2001), by Bill Slavicsek & JD Wiker
- Star Wars Adventure Journal (volumes 1-15) (1994–1997, various editors, various points along timeline)

=== The Clone Wars: Decide Your Destiny ===
- The Clone Wars: Tethan Battle Adventure by Sue Behrent (22 BBY) (youth)
- The Clone Wars: Crisis on Coruscant by Jonathan Green (22 BBY) (youth)
- The Clone Wars: Dooku's Secret Army by Sue Behrent (22 BBY) (youth)
- The Clone Wars: The Way of the Jedi by Jake T. Ford (21 BBY) (youth)
- The Clone Wars: The Lost Legion by Tracey West (21 BBY) (youth)

=== The Lost Jedi ===
- Jedi Dawn (0 BBY), by Paul Cockburn, 1993.
- The Bounty Hunter (2 ABY), by Paul Cockburn, 1994.
- The Lost Jedi Adventure Game Book (compiling the above), by Paul Cockburn, 1995.
