= Darth (disambiguation) =

Darth is a title which precedes the moniker of a Sith Lord.

Darth may also refer to:

- Darth Vader
- Darth Maul
- Darth Sidious
- Darth Tryanus
- Darth Revan
- Darth Plagueis
- Darth Bane
