= Pablo Hidalgo =

Chilean-born author, creative executive based in California

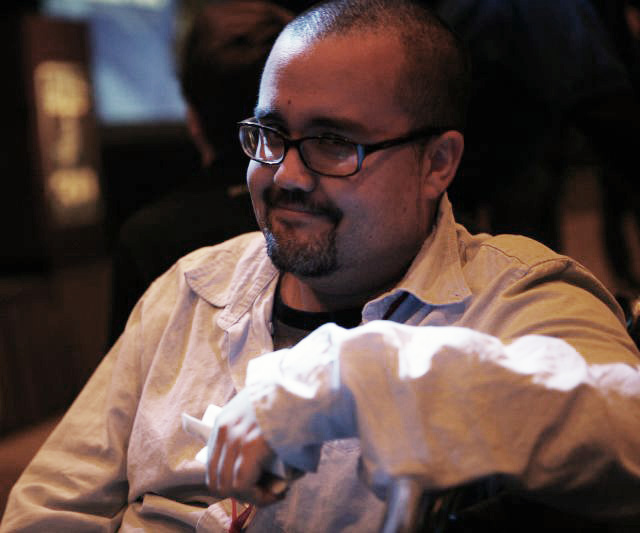
- Pablo Hidalgo at Star Wars Celebration IV, 2007
- Born: Santiago, Chile
- Occupations: Author; creative executive
- Writing career
- Years active: 1995–present
- Genre: Science fiction
- Subject: Star Wars

Pablo Hidalgo is a Chilean-born creative executive based in California, for Lucasfilm on the Star Wars franchise. As part of the Lucasfilm Story Group, he along with Kiri Hart and Leland Chee is frequently named as one of the people tasked with maintaining the canon of the franchise after its partial reboot in 2014 and often consults on Star Wars projects in development regarding their integration in the larger Star Wars canon. He is the author of several official references and guidebooks about the Star Wars, G.I. Joe and Transformers franchises.

== Early work ==
Hidalgo was born in Santiago, Chile, and raised in Winnipeg, Manitoba, Canada. In 1987 he became a fan of the role-playing game (RPG) resources published by West End Games, the only official source of Star Wars content in the late 1980s, and took it upon himself to become knowledgeable of the universe to create better stories for the group of friends he was playing it with. He later used both content from the RPG and ideas he developed for his gaming sessions within official Star Wars media, such as the tracking device used by the Inquisitor and the name of a ship in Star Wars Rebels.

He submitted content for West End Games' Star Wars Adventure Journal in 1993. Although rejected because he was not a published author at the time, his correspondence with the company resulted in his being hired as a cartoonist for the magazine by Peter Schweighofer. Since he was now a published author, he was allowed to publish both material for the RPG and stories in the magazine.

During his involvement, he collected the first large-scale database of Star Wars knowledge, parts of which he posted online in 1997 as the "Star Wars Index". He used his extensive knowledge to assist Steve Sansweet with fact-checking the Star Wars Encyclopedia, the first such work published shortly before the release of the Star Wars prequel trilogy.

== Working for Lucasfilm ==
In January 2000 he was hired by Sansweet at Lucasfilm to build up StarWars.com, the official Star Wars website, as a resource for fans during the then-active filming and launch of the Star Wars prequel trilogy. He then served as internet content manager for Lucas Online, the division of Lucasfilm responsible for maintaining StarWars.com, where he published multiple comics until 2011. In addition, during this time Hidalgo was consulted to ensure continuity in various Star Wars media releases.

In 2005, he had a nonspeaking cameo role in Star Wars: Episode III – Revenge of the Sith as a patron of the opera Chancellor Palpatine and Anakin Skywalker visit.

=== Disney's acquisition of Lucasfilm ===
After the acquisition of Lucasfilm by The Walt Disney Company, Kathleen Kennedy created the Lucasfilm Story Group, a group of Star Wars experts tasked with maintaining the canon of the franchise after its partial reboot in 2014. While at Lucasfilm, Hidalgo was known for his extensive knowledge of Star Wars mythology and was added as a member of story group led by Kiri Hart, alongside "Keeper of the Holocron" Leland Chee.

Sometimes called the Yoda of Lucasfilm or "the Indiana Jones of Star Wars", his extensive knowledge of Star Wars canon is used by multiple sources to confirm or deny rumors about certain characters, locations or events within the fictional universe. J. J. Abrams noted that during the production of Star Wars: The Force Awakens, he frequently consulted Hidalgo. In 2022, Hidalgo's official title at Lucasfilm was creative executive and "Star Wars Lore Advisor".

== Partial bibliography ==
Hidalgo is the author of several official reference and guide books about the Star Wars franchise as well as the G.I. Joe and Transformers franchises.

- Star Wars Chronicles: The Prequels (with Steve Sansweet) (2005)
- G.I. Joe vs. Cobra: The Essential Guide, 1982-2008 (2009)
- Transformers Vault: The Complete Transformers Universe Showcasing Rare Collectibles and Memorabilia (2011)
- The Essential Reader's Companion (2012)
- Star Wars: A New Hero (2014)
- Star Wars Rebels: Head to Head (2014)
- Star Wars: The Force Awakens: The Visual Dictionary (2015)
- Star Wars Propaganda: A History of Persuasive Art in the Galaxy (2016)
- Star Wars: Rogue One: The Ultimate Visual Guide (2016)
- Star Wars: From a Certain Point of View (2017)
- Star Wars: The Last Jedi: The Visual Dictionary (2017)
- Solo: A Star Wars Story: The Official Guide (2018)
- Star Wars: Scum and Villainy: Case Files on the Galaxy's Most Notorious (2018)
- Star Wars: The Rise of Skywalker: The Visual Dictionary (2019)
