= Star Wars: The Secrets of the Sith =

Star Wars novel written by Marc Sumerak

- Author: Marc Sumerak
- Illustrator: Sergio Gómez Silván
- Publication date: October 12, 2021
- Media type: Hardcover
- Pages: 32
- ISBN: 9781647221973

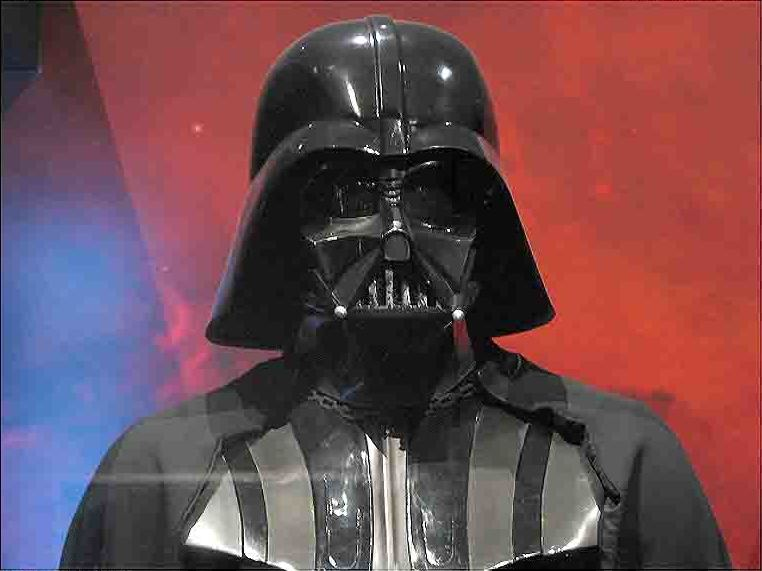
Darth Vader, a pivotal Sith figure explored in The Secrets of the Sith.

Star Wars: The Secrets of the Sith is a novel written by Marc Sumerak with illustrations by Sergio Gómez Silván. Published by Insight Editions and set in the Star Wars universe, the book is narrated from the perspective of Emperor Palpatine, the franchise's main antagonist. The book is intended as a counterpart to Sumerak’s earlier work, The Secrets of the Jedi, published in 2019.

== Content ==
The Secrets of the Sith is written from the viewpoint of Palpatine, a fictional character in the Star Wars franchise and the antagonist in the Skywalker Saga, as he explores his relationship with his master, Darth Plagueis, and the origin of Starkiller Base, which plays a major role in The Force Awakens.

Palpatine also describes his views on the Chosen One prophecy; according to him, Anakin actually did bring balance to the Force, not despite destroying the Jedi, but because of it. Anakin had restored the balance to the Force "by banishing light and power over darkness," Palpatine reflects. This view gives an alternative interpretation of the prophecy from the traditional one that supports Sith.

== Development ==
Marc Sumerak emphasized the difficulty of narrating from Palpatine’s perspective. he was aided by editor Chris Prince in his efforts to balance the character's manipulative, public persona with his true nature as a power-driven Sith Lord.

The artwork was drawn by Sergio Gómez Silván, who sought to reflect what he calls the "mythic" atmosphere of the Sith. His illustrations incorporate medieval and Art Nouveau influences. Silván uses contrasting colors to depict events, such as orange for Anakin Skywalker’s transformation into Darth Vader. The book also features pop-up elements, booklets, and lift-the-flap inserts.

== Reception ==
The Secrets of the Sith received positive reviews for its narration and artwork. Fantha Tracks described the book as "a fascinating read, perfect for those immersing themselves in the legends surrounding the Force," praising the quality of the interactive design and artwork. The website found the book as appealing to a wide audience.
