= Star Wars Scrapbook =

1998 Star Wars book

- Subject: Star Wars
- Publication date: 2 April 2005
- ISBN: 978-0375826115

Star Wars Scrapbook is a book with pull-out reproductions of Star Wars merchandise/artifacts, in a similar fashion to the books Greetings From E Street: The Story of Bruce Springsteen and the E Street Band and Tupac Shakur Legacy.

Written by Stephen J. Sansweet, a former reporter for The Wall Street Journal, it contains pictures of Star Wars merchandise as well as a copy of an invitation to a San Francisco press screening of Return of the Jedi, a reprint of the first newsletter of the Official Star Wars Fan Club, and a C-3PO cut out mask. Also included were Movie posters, a punch out X-wing glider and backstage passes to the filming of The Empire Strikes Back. Daly from Entertainment Weekly graded the book as a B and wrote "It’s charming but creepy, and if Jedi Knights existed, they’d probably rank it alongside winking-Jesus 3-D postcards in the annals of misguided relics of adoration."
