= Rancho Obi-Wan =

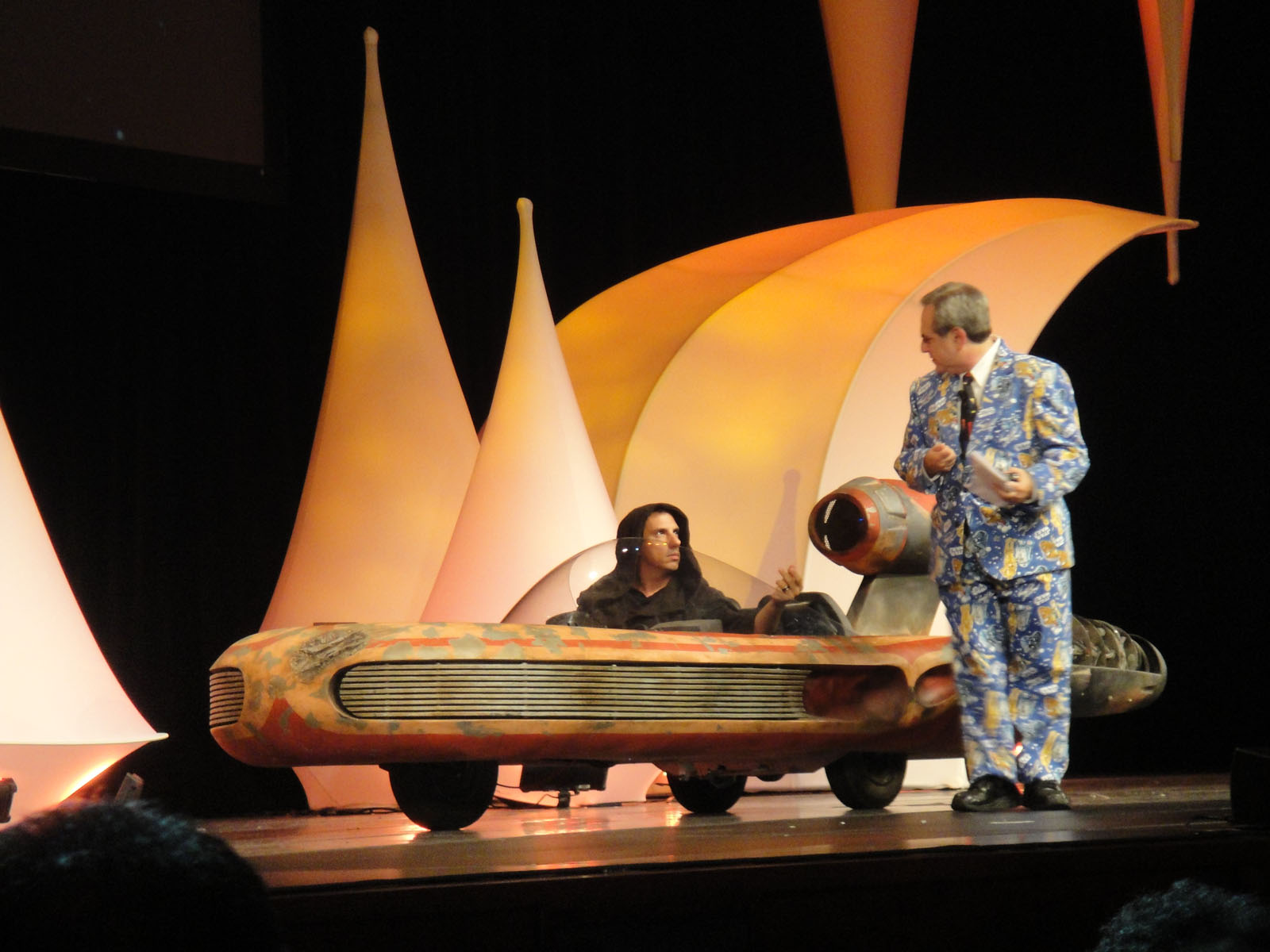
- Rancho Obi-Wan owner Steve Sansweet (standing) at Star Wars Celebration V
- Established: 2011
- Location: Petaluma, California
- Type: Pop-culture museum
- Collections: Star Wars
- Collection size: ~500,000
- Founder: Steve Sansweet
- President: Anne Neumann
- CEO: Anne Neumann
- Website: https://ranchoobiwan.org/

Rancho Obi-Wan is a nonprofit museum in Petaluma, California, that houses the Guinness World Record certified largest collection of Star Wars memorabilia, amassed by Steve Sansweet. Rancho Obi-Wan covers over 9,000 square feet.

== History ==
The museum had its roots in Steve Sansweet's personal collection, amassed since before the original Star Wars movie was released. It got started in earnest when Sansweet pulled a Star Wars promotional mailer out of his boss's wastebasket when he worked at The New York Times. The museum itself was built out of an old chicken ranch in Petaluma, California. The museum still houses several chickens and contains coops near the entrance to the main house. The chicken ranch was purchased by Sansweet in 1998.

In the fall of 2011, Sansweet filed for nonprofit status to launch Rancho Obi-Wan as a 501(c)(3) nonprofit and opened the museum officially, however it had been in existence in previous years.

Rancho Obi-Wan offers scheduled, guided tours only during selected days of the year, by appointment only. Because Sansweet's museum and ranch is inside a gated, private residence with no public access or parking, Rancho Obi-Wan does not publicly publish its physical location. Directions are only given to visitors after they book their tour tickets on the museum's website. In 2014, the Guinness Book of World Records officially certified Rancho Obi-Wan as the largest collection of Star Wars memorabilia.

Throughout 2015 and 2016, Carl Edward Cunningham, a longtime friend of Steve Sansweet, stole over 120 collectibles from the museum. Valued at over $200,000, the theft consisted of primarily vintage Kenner Star Wars action figures. Sansweet met Cunningham in 1996, who stayed at the museum several times in the period of theft. Cunningham pled guilty to grand theft in 2017 in a Sonoma County, California court.

At Star Wars Celebration 2019 in Chicago, Rancho Obi-Wan showcased its collection in the exhibition hall, including displays about Star Wars Celebration, and women in Star Wars. Sansweet and Rancho Obi-Wan were also present at Star Wars Celebration 2022 in Anaheim, hosting a Mandalorian themed exhibition.

During the COVID-19 pandemic, Rancho Obi-Wan halted all tours of the facility, and closed the museum. In response, the museum started an online version that documented the collection over a series of photos and videos. In 2021, USA Today hosted a poll to determine the top ten pop culture museums in the United States for its readers choice program, with Rancho Obi-Wan in third place after the Birthplace of Country Music Museum and the Patsy Cline museum. Subsequent polls placed the museum eighth in 2022 and 2024, and seventh place in 2023.

== Gala ==
Starting in 2013, Rancho Obi-Wan hosts a fundraising event dubbed the Rancho Obi-Wan Gala. The event centers around a live auction that raises money for the museum. During the coronavirus pandemic, the Gala was held online.

== Inventory count ==
As of May 4, 2015, Rancho Obi-Wan officially had 93,260 pieces of Star Wars memorabilia; however, that is just the number audited and catalogued for the Guinness World Record. Over the years the collection's size estimates have increased from 350,000, to 400,000, to more than 500,000.
