= Star Wars Encyclopedia =

1998 reference book by Steve Sansweet

- Author: Stephen J. Sansweet
- Language: English
- Subject: Star Wars
- Publisher: Del Rey
- Publication date: Hardcover: June 30, 1998
- Publication place: United States
- Media type: Hardcover
- Pages: Hardcover: 384
- ISBN: 0-345-40227-8
- Followed by: The Complete Star Wars Encyclopedia

Star Wars Encyclopedia is a 1998 reference book written by science fiction author Stephen J. Sansweet, the director of content management at Lucasfilm. The book defines, explains, and illustrates the characters, creatures, settings, objects, events, and concepts that appear in the Star Wars space-opera media franchise. Data is drawn from the original trilogy films, radio dramas, novels, short stories, graphic novels, and computer games. The Star Wars Encyclopedia contains an introduction written by science-fiction and Star Wars author Timothy Zahn. The book was expanded and updated in 2008 as The Complete Star Wars Encyclopedia, co-written by Sansweet and Pablo Hidalgo.

According to Sansweet, he wrote the book from the in-universe perspective of a group of scholars writing about 25 years after the events of Return of the Jedi. He used Bill Slavicsek's second edition of A Guide to the Star Wars Universe (1994) as a primary reference, also drawing from the Essential Guides to Vehicles and Vessels and Characters (both 1995).

Franchise creator George Lucas said in 2005 that he used the encyclopedia to see if names he came up with had already been used in the Expanded Universe.
