= Palpatine =

Star Wars character

Sheev Palpatine
- Star Wars character
- Ian McDiarmid as Palpatine in Return of the Jedi (1983)
- First appearance: The Empire Strikes Back (1980)
- Created by: George Lucas
- Portrayed by: Ian McDiarmid; Marjorie Eaton (Note: Marjorie Eaton portrays the holographic Emperor in the original release of The Empire Strikes Back. McDiarmid replaces Eaton in the 2004 Special Edition.)
- Voiced by: Clive Revill (Note: Original release of The Empire Strikes Back); Ian McDiarmid (Note: Rebels, season 2 since 2019, season 4, The Bad Batch, Tales of the Jedi); Nick Jameson (Note: Clone Wars); Sam Witwer (Note: Rebels, season 2 until 2019, The Force Unleashed, The Force Unleashed II, Lego Star Wars games, Battlefront II (2017), Maul – Shadow Lord); Ian Abercrombie (Note: The Clone Wars film and TV series, seasons 1–6)); Tim Curry (Note: The Clone Wars, seasons 5–6); Trevor Devall (Note: Lego Star Wars films and television series)

In-universe information
- Full name: Sheev Palpatine
- Alias: Darth Sidious
- Occupation: Dark Lord of the Sith; Senator of Naboo; Supreme Chancellor of the Galactic Republic; Emperor of the Galactic Empire
- Affiliation: Sith Order; Galactic Republic; Trade Federation; Confederacy of Independent Systems; Galactic Empire; First Order
- Family: Dathan (clone/son) (Note: The expanded edition novelization of The Rise of Skywalker and the novel Shadow of the Sith reveal that both Snoke and Dathan were "strand-cast" clones of Palpatine himself.); Gallius Rax (adopted son); Rey (granddaughter); Snoke (clone); Others in Legends (Note: Palpatine's family members in the Star Wars Legends narrative universe include Cosinga Palpatine (father), Sly Moore (romantic partner), Triclops Palpatine (son), Kendalina (daughter-in-law), Ken Palpatine (grandson) and Mara Jade Skywalker (surrogate granddaughter).)
- Master: Darth Plagueis
- Apprentices: Darth Maul; Darth Tyranus; Darth Vader; Gallius Rax; Snoke; Others in Legends (Note: Palpatine's apprentices in the Star Wars Legends narrative universe include an unnamed Nikto, Vergere, Garth Ezzar, Ferus Olin, Mara Jade, Cronal, Ennix Devian, Lumiya, Luke Skywalker and Sedriss QL.)

Sheev Palpatine (/ˈpælpətiːn/ PAL-pə-teen) is a fictional character and the main antagonist of the Star Wars franchise. He first appeared in the 1980 film The Empire Strikes Back as the Emperor. He is also known by his Sith name, Darth Sidious, which was first used in the novelization of the 1999 film The Phantom Menace.

Palpatine appears in all three film trilogies in the Skywalker Saga, and is portrayed by Ian McDiarmid in all five films in which he physically appears. In the original trilogy, Palpatine is Emperor of the Galactic Empire and the master of Darth Vader, who kills him. In the prequel trilogy, Palpatine is a senator from the planet Naboo who masterminds the Clone Wars to make himself Supreme Chancellor of the Galactic Republic, which he forms into the Empire after destroying the Jedi Order and manipulating Anakin Skywalker into becoming Vader. In The Rise of Skywalker (2019), the final film in the saga, a resurrected Palpatine is revealed to be the creator of the First Order against the New Republic and the grandfather of Rey, the protagonist of the sequel trilogy and a Jedi-in-training, who defeats him.

Palpatine's story was inspired by real-world examples of political strongmen and democratic backsliding during the rise and rule of dictators such as Julius Caesar, Napoleon Bonaparte, and Adolf Hitler. Since the release of the original trilogy, Palpatine has become a widely recognized symbol of evil in popular culture. Since the prequel trilogy, he has been a symbol of sinister deception and the subversion of democracy. In addition to the films, Palpatine appears in the series Clone Wars, The Clone Wars, Star Wars Rebels, The Bad Batch, Obi-Wan Kenobi and Star Wars: Tales. He also appears in Star Wars novels and comics.

== Creation and development ==
=== Concept and writing ===
George Lucas created the Star Wars franchise and the character Palpatine. His conceptualization of Palpatine and the role he plays in the franchise changed over time. Lucas's initial notes discuss a line of corrupt emperors, not just one. In the 1974 draft of Star Wars, (Note: Later retitled Star Wars: Episode IV—A New Hope) the "New Galactic Empire" was led by a relatively young human named Cos Dashit. The name Palpatine first appears in the prologue of Alan Dean Foster's 1976 novelization of Star Wars, which details the Emperor's rise to power. From Return of the Jedi (1983) onwards, the Emperor became the ultimate personification of evil in the series. Though the films of the original Star Wars trilogy do not actually state the Emperor's name, the novelization of Return of the Jedi states his surname as Palpatine. He was given the first name Sheev in the 2014 novel Tarkin.

During the story development of The Empire Strikes Back (1980), Lucas decided that, with the original having only passingly mentioned the Emperor, he needed to "begin to deal with him on a more concrete level". Lucas realized, however, that the primary conflict with the Emperor would be best saved for the trilogy's third film, Return of the Jedi, because "[w]hen you get rid of the Emperor, the whole thing is over." Discussing the character's importance to the story, Lucas stated that "In the end, the Emperor does exactly what [Obi-Wan Kenobi] did; he can also transform himself", referring to the ability to live after death through the Force. Although Palpatine dies at the end of Return of the Jedi, the plot point of his metamorphosis was utilized for the sequel trilogy, which Lucas had no direct involvement with.

In Return of the Jedi, the initial conception of Palpatine as a weak, isolated figurehead was superseded by his depiction as a dictatorial ruler adept in the dark side of the Force. The Emperor was inspired by the villain Ming the Merciless from the Flash Gordon comic books. The characterization of Palpatine as a ruthless politician dismantling a democratic republic to achieve supreme power was in part inspired by the real-world examples of democratic backsliding during the rise and rule of Julius Caesar, Napoleon Bonaparte, Alberto Fujimori, Ferdinand Marcos, and Adolf Hitler. Other elements of the character come from Richard Nixon. (Note: In his early drafts, Lucas used the plot point of a dictator staying in power with the support of the military. In his comment (made in the prequel trilogy era) Lucas attributed this to Nixon's supposed intention to defy the 22nd Amendment, but the president resigned in his second term. In the novelization of Attack of the Clones, it is noted that Palpatine had manipulated the law to stay in office as Supreme Chancellor for several years past his original term limit.) Lucas said that Nixon's presidency "got me to thinking historically about how do democracies get turned into dictatorships. Because the democracies aren't overthrown; they're given away." Lucas also said, "The whole point of the movies, the underlying element that makes the movies work, is that you, whether you go backwards or forwards, you start out in a democracy, and democracy turns into a dictatorship, and then the rebels make it back into a democracy."

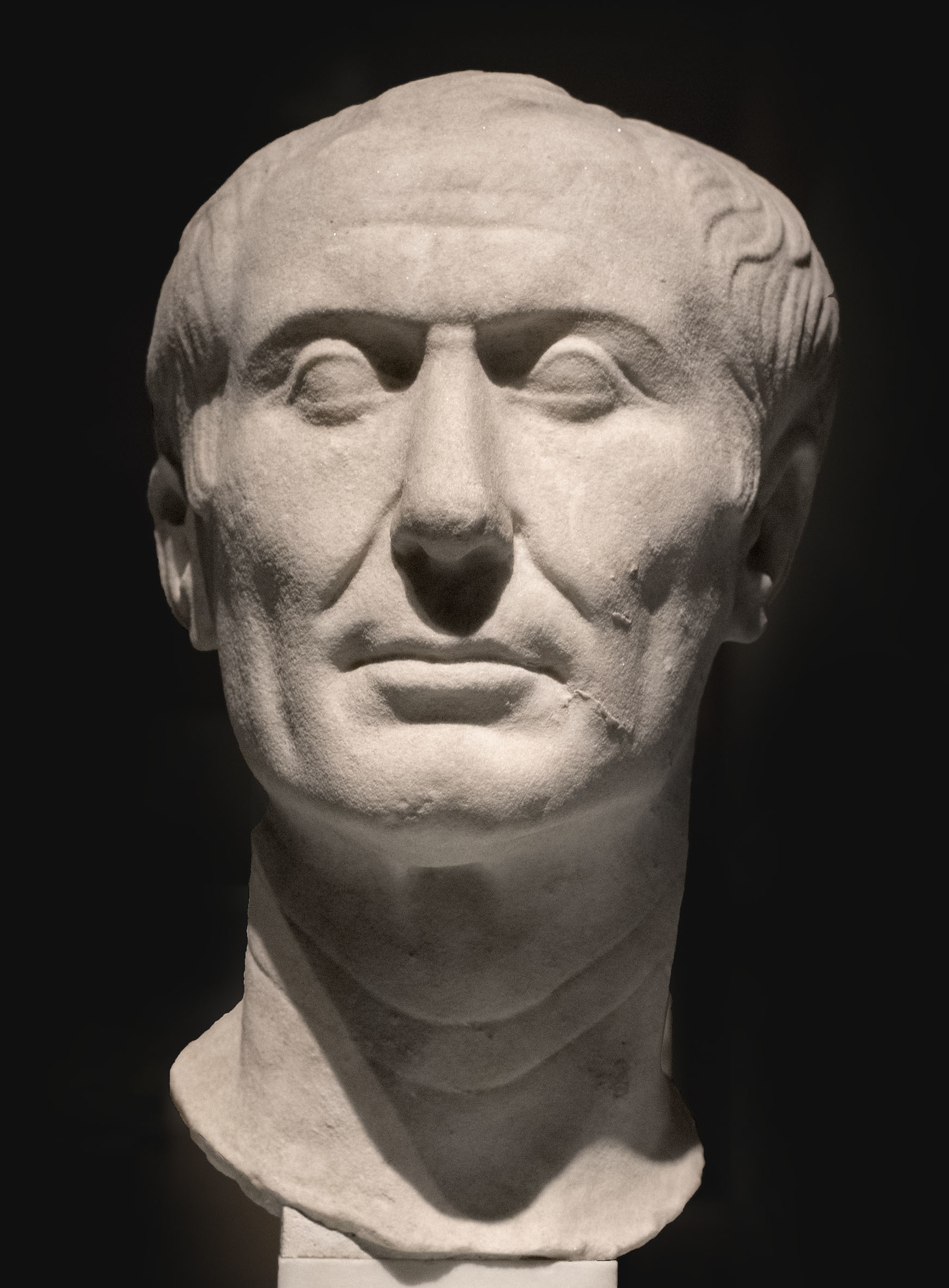
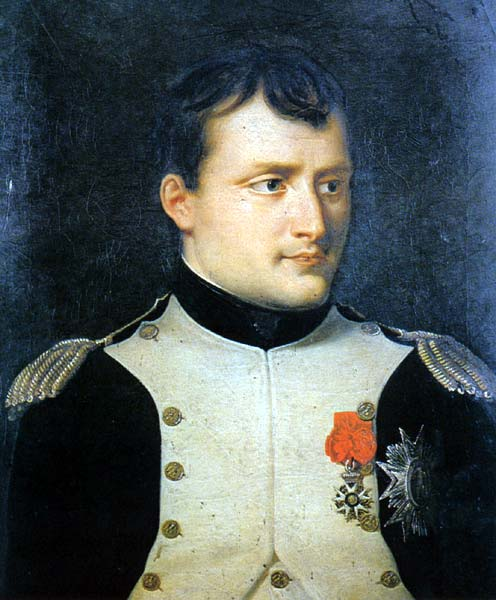
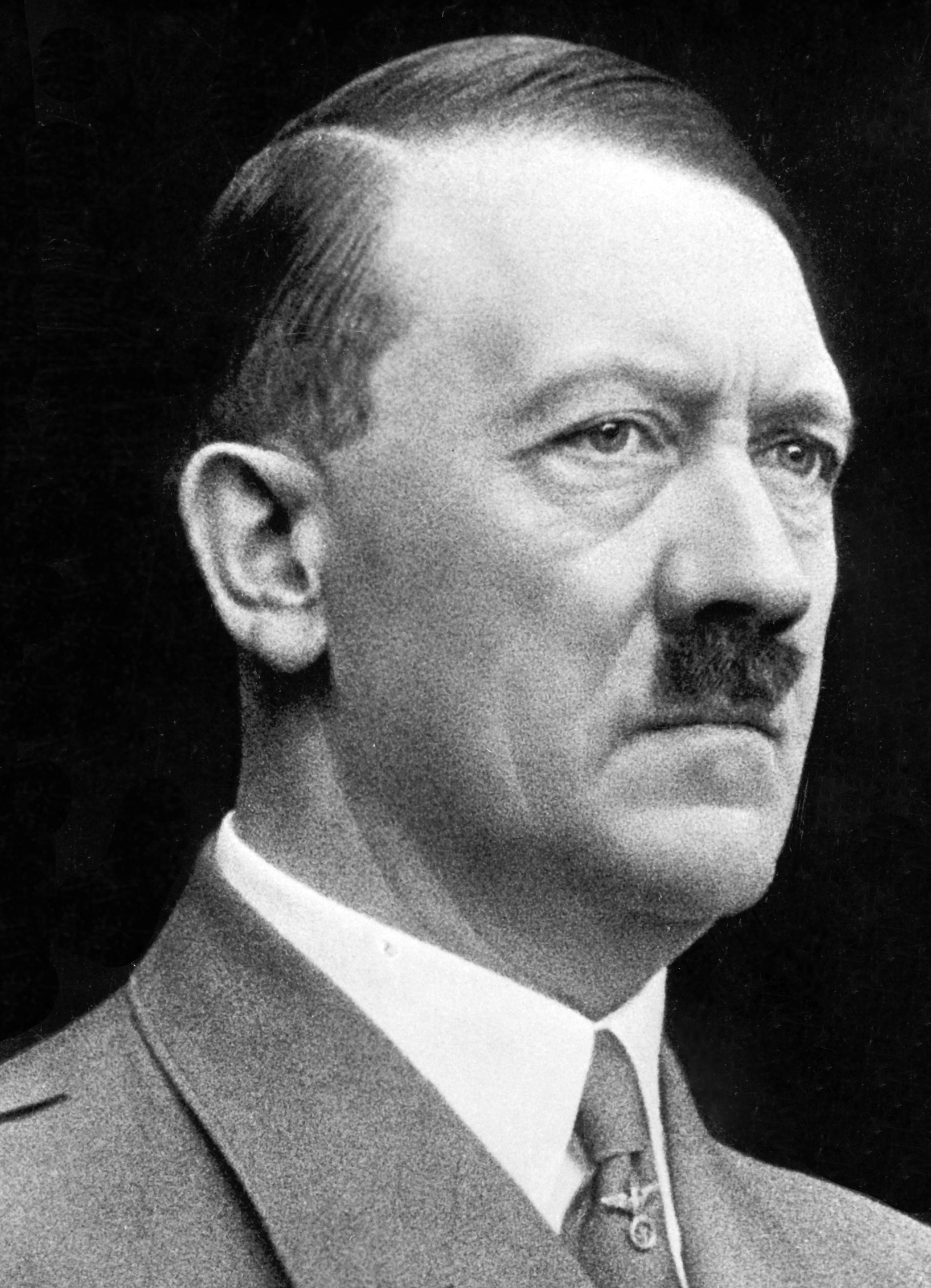
Palpatine was influenced by historical leaders such as (clockwise from top left) Julius Caesar, Napoleon Bonaparte, Adolf Hitler, and Richard Nixon.

Lucas wanted to establish the Emperor as the true source of evil in Star Wars. Screenwriter Lawrence Kasdan noted, "My sense of the relationship between Darth Vader and the Emperor is that the Emperor is much more powerful ... and that Vader is very much intimidated by him. Vader has dignity, but the Emperor in Jedi really has all the power." He explained that the climax of the film is a confrontation between Vader and his master. In the first scene that shows the Emperor, he arrives at the Death Star and is greeted by a host of stormtroopers, technicians, and other personnel. Lucas states he wanted it to look like the military parades on "May Day in Russia."

Lucas fleshed out the Emperor in the prequel trilogy. According to Lucas, Palpatine's role in The Phantom Menace is to explain "how Anakin Skywalker [later Vader] came to be Palpatine's apprentice" and the events that sparked Palpatine's rise to totalitarian power after being a senate representative. The film's novelization is the first time he is called Darth Sidious. His home world, Naboo, is also home to Anakin's romantic interest, Padmé Amidala, who later becomes a senator of that planet.

In the Lucasfilm-authorized Star Wars and History, Palpatine's consolidation of power is described as being similar to the first Roman emperor, Augustus. Both legitimized authoritarian rule by saying that corruption in the Senate was hampering the powers of the head of state; both pressured the Senate to grant extraordinary powers to deal with a crisis, falsely claiming that they would rescind those powers once the crisis was over; and both relied on their strong control over military force.

The director of The Rise of Skywalker (2019), J. J. Abrams, stated of Palpatine's return from the dead that "when you look at this as nine chapters of a story, perhaps the weirder thing would be if Palpatine didn't return. You just look at what he talks about, who he is, how important he is, what the story is — strangely, his absence entirely from the third trilogy would be conspicuous." (Note: Although Lucas seeded the idea that Palpatine might return, while promoting The Force Awakens, Abrams stated that the revived empire was inspired by the idea that the Nazis fled to South America and continued their schemes. Hitler, (an inspiration for Palpatine) has been similarly claimed to have somehow returned.) (Note: Although initially surprised to learn the character would return, Palpatine portrayer Ian McDiarmid defended the decision, stating in 2022 that "A lot of people said, 'You can't bring him back, he was dead! Did you see that fall? How could anyone survive that?' ... He's the Emperor ... Anyway, nobody's going to tell me he wouldn't have had a Plan B ... And of course he had the best operational ward team of surgeons.")

=== Portrayal ===
Original portrayal of Emperor Palpatine

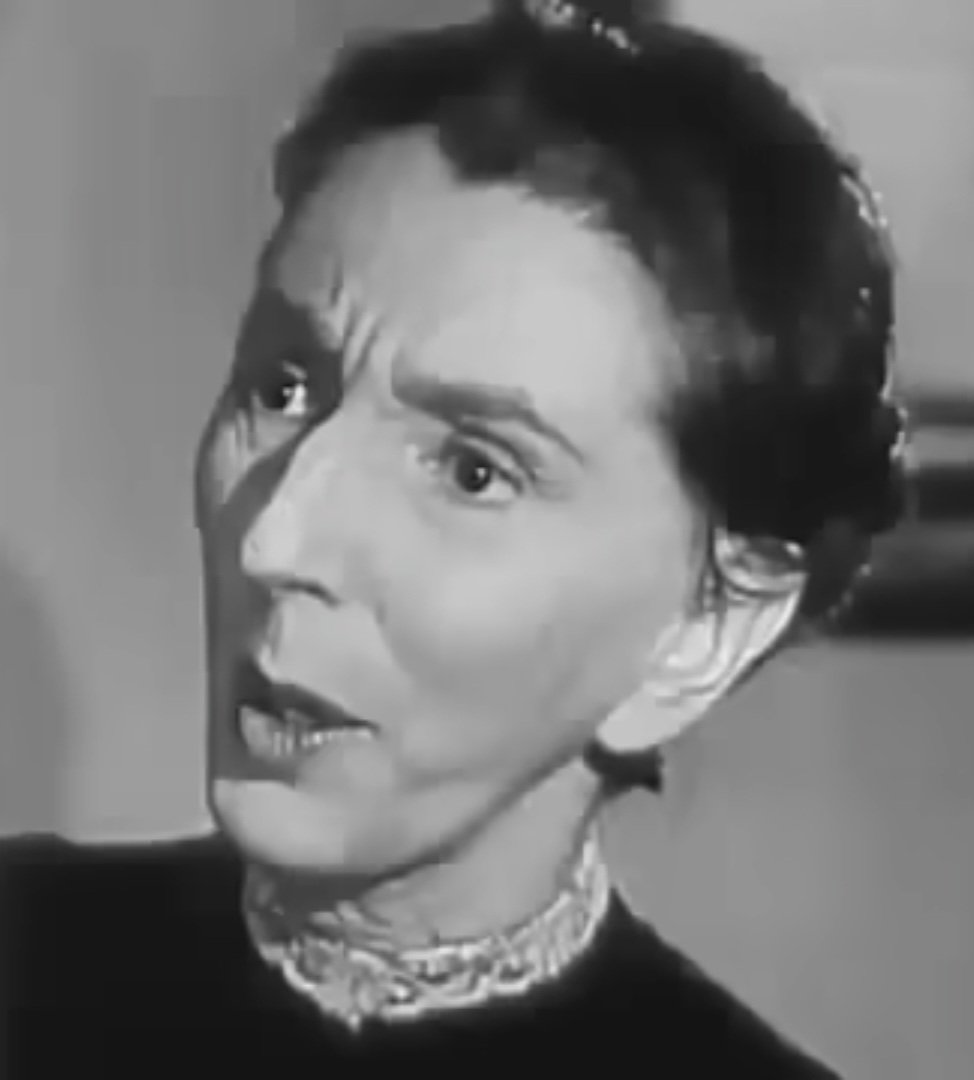
Marjorie Eaton (under makeup)

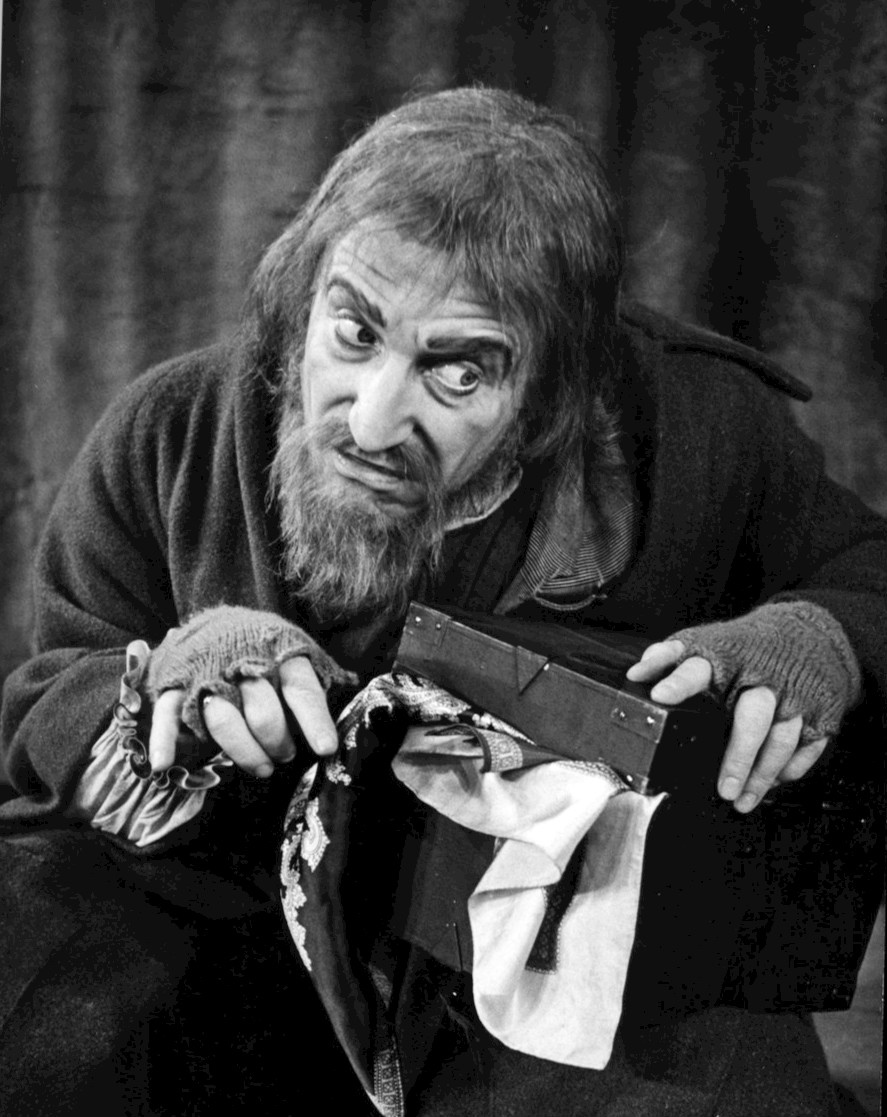
Clive Revill (voiceover)

The Emperor's on-screen appearance as a hologram

The Emperor's first appearance in The Empire Strikes Back (1980) was created with two actors.

When the Emperor first appeared in The Empire Strikes Back, he was portrayed by Marjorie Eaton under heavy makeup. Chimpanzee eyes were superimposed into darkened eye sockets during post-production. The character was voiced by Clive Revill. The makeup was sculpted by Phil Tippett and applied by Rick Baker, who initially used his own wife, Elaine, for the makeup tests.

"With [director Irvin] Kershner," Revill said, "you had to keep the reins tight — you couldn't go overboard. It was the perfect example of the old adage 'less is more' — the Emperor doesn't say very much. But when he finally appears, it's at a point in the saga when everyone's waiting to see him. It's the Emperor, the arch-villain of all time, and when he says there's a great disturbance in the Force, I mean, that's enough oomph!" Years later, during the production of Revenge of the Sith (2005), Lucas decided to shoot new footage for The Empire Strikes Back to create continuity between the prequels and original trilogy. Thus, in the 2004 DVD release of The Empire Strikes Back Special Edition, the original version of the Emperor was replaced by Ian McDiarmid, and the dialogue between the Emperor and Darth Vader was revised.

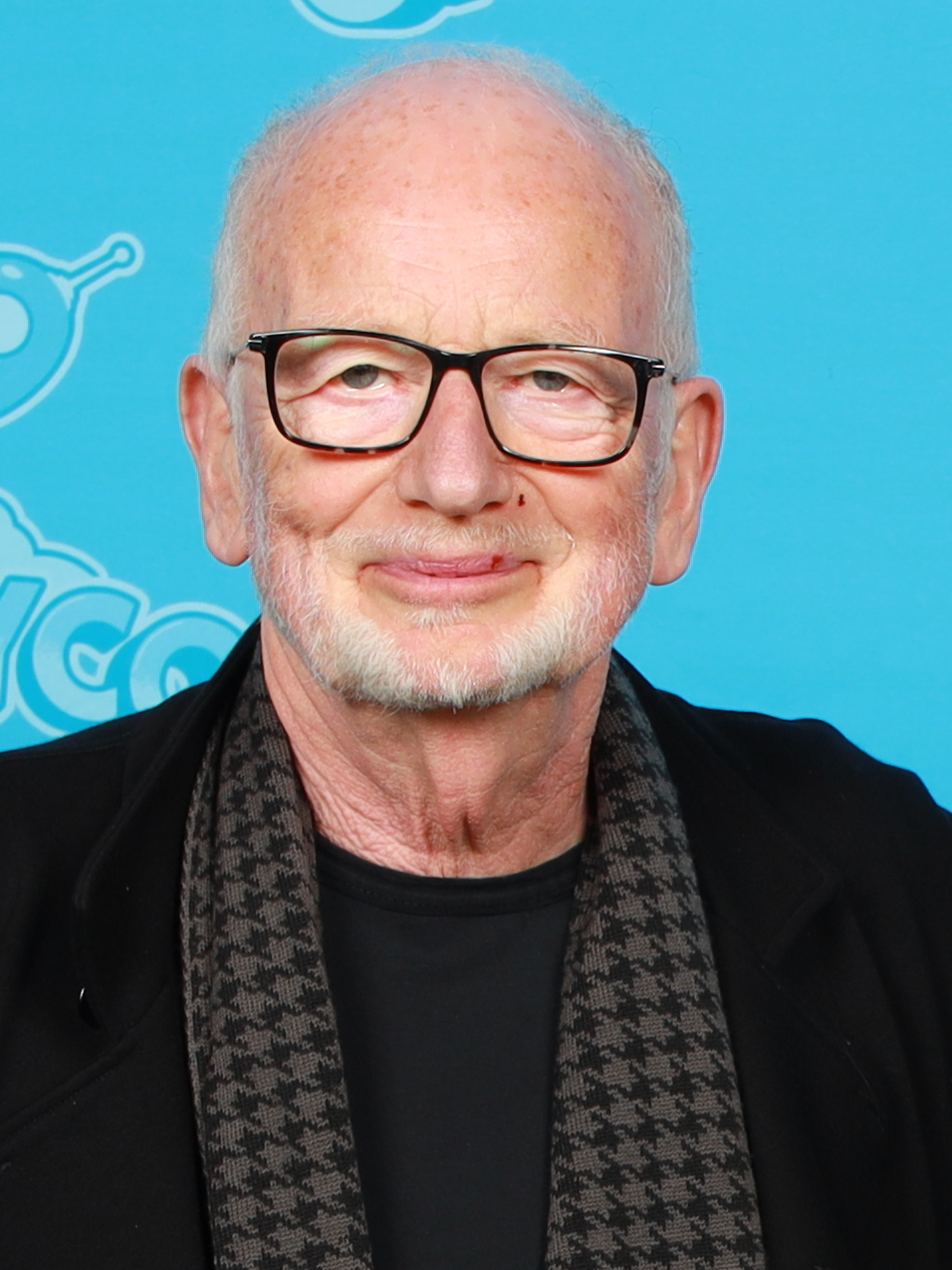
From Return of the Jedi (1983), the role of the Emperor was portrayed by Ian McDiarmid.

Lucas and director Richard Marquand cast McDiarmid to play Emperor Palpatine for Return of the Jedi. He was in his late 30s and had never played a leading role in a feature film, though he had made minor appearances in films like Dragonslayer (1981). Due to the large age difference between McDiarmid and his character, Lucas and Marquand had initially intended to dub over McDiarmid, but reversed course after hearing McDiarmid's distinctive voice. After Return of the Jedi, he resumed stage acting in London. In an interview with BackStage, McDiarmid revealed that he "never had his sights set on a film career" and never auditioned for the role of Palpatine. He elaborated, "I got called in for the interview after a Return of the Jedi casting director saw me perform in the Sam Shepard play Seduced at a studio theatre at the Royal Court. I was playing a dying Howard Hughes."

Palpatine's role in the prequel films required McDiarmid to portray two aspects of the same character. Recalling the initial days of shooting The Phantom Menace, McDiarmid stated, "Palpatine's an interesting character; he's conventional on the outside, but demonic on the inside — he's on the edge, trying to go beyond what's possible." McDiarmid added another layer to the character in Attack of the Clones. He said, "[Palpatine] is a supreme actor. He has to be even more convincing than somebody who isn't behaving in a schizophrenic fashion, so he's extra charming, or extra professional — and for those who are looking for clues, that's almost where you can see them." McDiarmid reflected on the scene in which Padmé Amidala is almost assassinated:

There's a moment in one scene of the new film where tears almost appear in [Palpatine's] eye. These are crocodile tears, but for all those in the movie, and perhaps watching the movie itself, they'll see he is apparently moved — and of course, he is. He can just do it. He can, as it were, turn it on. And I suppose for him, it's also a bit of a turn-on — the pure exercise of power is what he's all about. That's the only thing he's interested in and the only thing that can satisfy him — which makes him completely fascinating to play because it is an evil soul. He is more evil than the devil.

In Revenge of the Sith, McDiarmid plays an even darker version of the character. He explained that "when you're playing a character of solid blackness, that in itself is very interesting, in the sense that you have no other motivation other than the accumulation of power. It's not so much about not having a moral center, it's just that the only thing that mattered is increasing power." McDiarmid asserted that everything Palpatine does "is an act of pure hypocrisy" and compared him to Iago, the villain of William Shakespeare's Othello.

McDiarmid noticed that the script for Revenge of the Sith demanded more action from his character than in previous films. Lightsaber combat was a challenge to the 60-year-old actor, who, like his costars, took fencing lessons. The close-up shots and non-acrobatic sequences of the duel between Palpatine and Mace Windu were performed by McDiarmid. Advanced fencing and acrobatic stunts were executed by McDiarmid's stunt doubles.

In The Rise of Skywalker (2019), McDiarmid returned to the role onscreen for the first time since Revenge of the Sith. Ahead of the film's wide release, McDiarmid stated that Palpatine was "fairly physically impaired, but his mind is as sharp as ever".

=== Makeup and costumes ===
Transforming McDiarmid into Emperor Palpatine for Return of the Jedi required extensive makeup, which took between two and four hours to apply. Film critic Roger Ebert wrote that the Emperor "looks uncannily like Death in The Seventh Seal," and film historian Robin Wood compared him to the hag from Snow White and the Seven Dwarfs (1937). McDiarmid remarked, "When my face changes in [Revenge of the Sith], my mind went back to the early silent movie of The Phantom of the Opera with Lon Chaney."

Palpatine's wardrobe in the prequels, tailored by costume designer Trisha Biggar, played an important part in the development of the character. In Attack of the Clones, explained McDiarmid, "The costumes ... have got much more edge to them, I think than the mere senator had in The Phantom Menace. So we see the trappings of power." McDiarmid's favorite costume in the film was a high-collared jacket that resembles reptile skin. He stated that "it just feels reptilian, which is exactly right for [Palpatine]." Biggar explained that the character's costumes become "progressively darker and more ornately decorated throughout the movie." She added: "He wears greys and browns, almost going to black, taking him toward the dark side."

In The Rise of Skywalker, Palpatine is unable to move without the aid of a large machine, to which he is attached. His eyes have no pupils and his hands are rotting. Costume designer Michael Kaplan opted to dress Palpatine in a utilitarian black robe, which he wears for the majority of the film. At the end of the film, Palpatine rejuvenates himself using the Force and becomes physically mobile. He dons a new costume—a formal robe with red velvet—which Kaplan refers to as "his true Emperor's garb".

=== Reception ===
Todd McCarthy of Variety described McDiarmid's portrayal of Palpatine in Revenge of the Sith as "dominant" and "worth writing home about". Reviewing the same film, Ed Halter of The Village Voice wrote that "McDiarmid's unctuous Emperor turns appropriately vampiric as he attempts to draw Anakin into the Sith fold with promises of eternal life." McDiarmid was nominated for the Saturn Award for Best Supporting Actor for his performance in Revenge of the Sith.

According to Cory Barlog, the planned-but-never-produced Star Wars: Underworld television series would have depicted Palpatine in a sympathetic way.

== Appearances ==
=== Film ===
==== Original trilogy ====
The character is referred to as "the Emperor" in the original trilogy. He is briefly mentioned in Star Wars (1977), the first film in the original trilogy, which was later retitled Episode IV – A New Hope. On the Death Star, Grand Moff Tarkin (Peter Cushing) explains to his fellow Imperials that the Emperor has dissolved the Imperial Senate, the last remnant of the Old Republic. The Emperor does not appear on-screen, leaving Tarkin and Darth Vader (played by David Prowse, voiced by James Earl Jones) as the film's main villains. The Emperor first appears in The Empire Strikes Back, the 1980 sequel to the original film. He appears as a hologram to inform Vader that Luke Skywalker (Mark Hamill) has become a threat to the Empire. Vader persuades him that the young Jedi would be a great asset if he could be turned to the dark side of the Force.

In 1983's Return of the Jedi, the Emperor appears in person to oversee the last stages of the second Death Star's construction. He assures Vader that they will together turn Luke, Vader's son, to the dark side of the Force. When Vader brings Luke before his master, the Emperor tempts Luke to join the dark side by appealing to the young Jedi's fear for his friends, whom he has lured into a trap. This leads to a lightsaber duel in which Luke defeats and nearly kills Vader. The Emperor urges Luke to kill Vader and take his place, but Luke refuses and declares himself a Jedi. Enraged, the Emperor attacks Luke with Force lightning. Unable to bear the sight of his son in pain, Vader throws the Emperor down a chasm to his death shortly before the Death Star is destroyed.

==== Prequel trilogy ====
Ian McDiarmid as Senator Palpatine in The Phantom Menace (1999)

In the 1999 prequel Episode I: The Phantom Menace, set 32 years before A New Hope, Palpatine (named onscreen for the first time) is depicted as a Galactic Senator from the planet Naboo. As his alter ego, the Sith Lord Darth Sidious, he advises the corrupt Trade Federation to blockade and invade Naboo. Queen Padmé Amidala of Naboo (Natalie Portman) flees to the planet Coruscant to receive counsel from Palpatine, unaware that he actually engineered the invasion. After a plea for help from the Senate results in bureaucratic delays, Palpatine manipulates and deceives Padmé into calling for a motion of no confidence against Supreme Chancellor Finis Valorum (Terence Stamp).

When Padmé attempts to liberate Naboo, Sidious sends his apprentice Darth Maul (portrayed by Ray Park, voiced by Peter Serafinowicz) to capture her. The invasion is eventually thwarted, and Maul is defeated in a lightsaber duel with Jedi Padawan Obi-Wan Kenobi (Ewan McGregor). Palpatine uses the crisis to get elected as the new Chancellor of the Republic. He then returns to Naboo, where he befriends the nine-year-old Anakin Skywalker (Jake Lloyd), telling the boy, "We will watch your career with great interest."

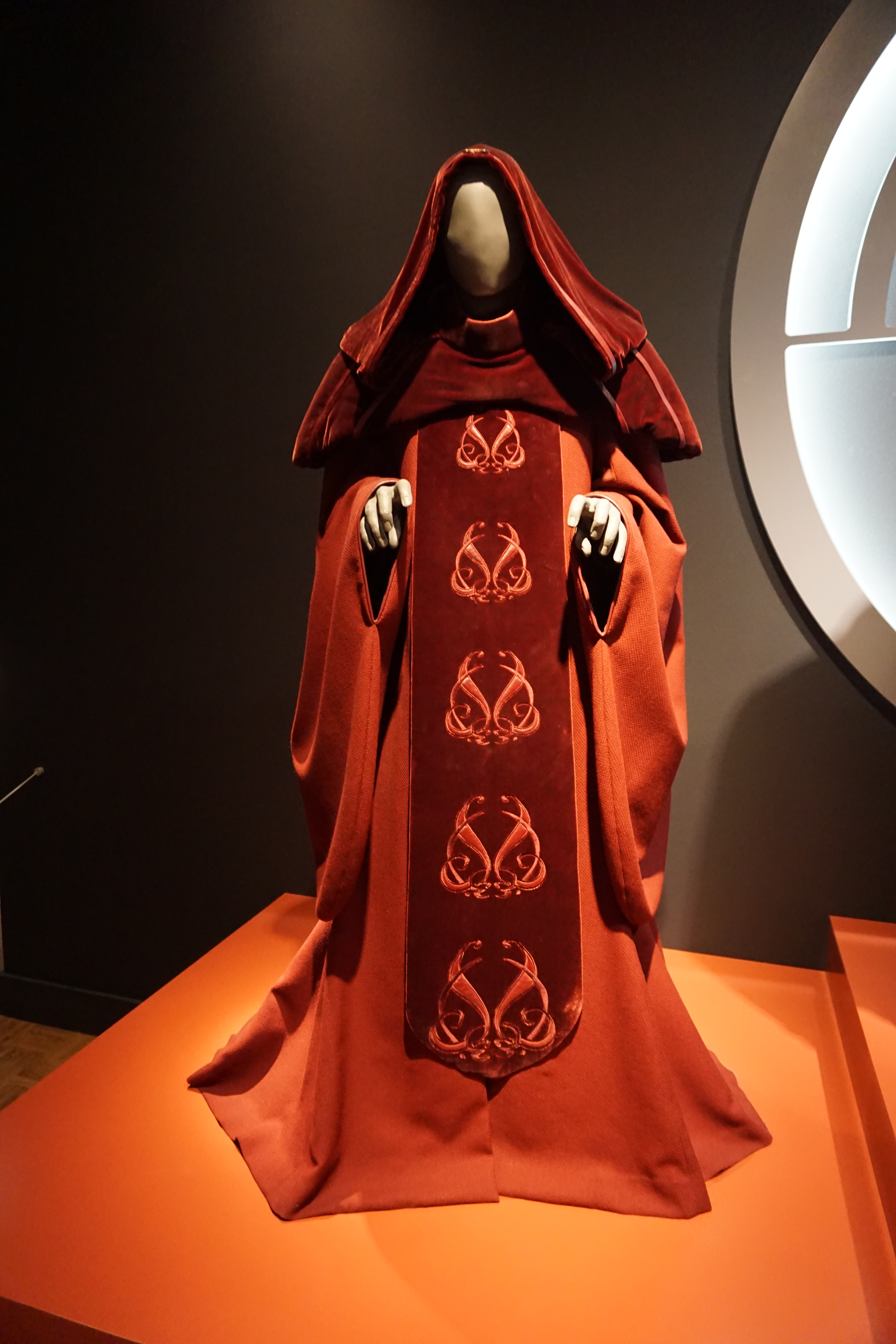
Senate costume of Darth Sidious in Episode III

In the 2002 sequel Episode II: Attack of the Clones, set 10 years later, Palpatine exploits constitutional loopholes to remain in office after his term expires. Meanwhile, as Sidious, he continues to manipulate events from behind the scenes by having his new Sith apprentice Count Dooku (Christopher Lee) lead a movement of planets in seceding to form the Confederacy of Independent Systems. He has the Separatists try to assassinate Padmé, now a senator, but the attempt on her life fails. He then arranges for Anakin (now played by Hayden Christensen) to guard Padmé on Naboo, which leads to them falling in love and marrying in secret.

When Obi-Wan discovers that the Separatists are secretly building a battle droid army, Palpatine uses the situation to have himself granted emergency powers. Palpatine feigns reluctance to accept this authority, promising to return it to the Senate once the crisis has ended. His first act is to allow a clone army's creation to counter the Separatist threat; this results in the first battle of the Clone Wars. With the galaxy now at war as Sidious planned, Dooku brings him the secret plans for the Death Star.

In the 2005 sequel Episode III: Revenge of the Sith, set three years later, Palpatine is captured by cyborg Separatist leader General Grievous (voiced by Matthew Wood). Palpatine is rescued by Anakin and Obi-Wan, but not before the Jedi confront Dooku again. A duel ensues in which Anakin defeats Dooku. Palpatine then betrays Dooku by ordering Anakin to kill him; after a moment's hesitation, Anakin beheads Dooku in cold blood. Palpatine then escapes with his rescuers and returns to Coruscant. By this point, Palpatine has become a virtual dictator, able to take any action in the Senate. He makes Anakin his personal representative on the Jedi Council, whose members deny Anakin the rank of Jedi Master and order him to spy on the Chancellor. Palpatine tells Anakin the story of Darth Plagueis, a powerful Sith Lord who was able to create life and prevent death, but was killed by his own apprentice. (Note: In the rough draft of Revenge of the Sith, Palpatine tells Anakin that he "used the power of the Force to will the midichlorians to start the cell divisions" that conceived him.) Eventually, Palpatine reveals his secret Sith identity to Anakin; he knows that Anakin has been having prophetic visions of Padmé dying in childbirth, and offers to teach him Plagueis' secrets to save Padmé's life.

Anakin informs Jedi Master Mace Windu (Samuel L. Jackson) of Palpatine's treachery. With three other Jedi Masters at his side, Windu attempts to arrest Palpatine, but Palpatine produces a lightsaber and dispatches all but Windu. Palpatine engages Windu in a duel and attacks him with Force lightning; Windu deflects the lightning back into Palpatine's face, deforming it into the gray, wizened visage first seen in the original trilogy. Before Windu can kill Palpatine, however, Anakin appears and, desperate to save Padme, betrays Windu, allowing Palpatine to kill Windu with another blast of lightning. Anakin then betrays the Jedi by pledging himself to the dark side as Palpatine's Sith apprentice, Darth Vader.

Palpatine issues Order 66, compelling the clone troopers to kill their Jedi generals for being "traitors" to the Republic, while dispatching Vader to kill everyone inside the Jedi Temple and then murder the Separatist leaders on the planet Mustafar. Palpatine then reorganizes the Republic into the Galactic Empire, with himself as Emperor, while framing the Jedi for treason. Jedi Master Yoda (voiced by Frank Oz) confronts Palpatine and engages him in a lightsaber duel that ends in a stalemate. Sensing that Vader is in danger, Palpatine travels to Mustafar and finds his new apprentice near death following a duel with Obi-Wan. After returning to Coruscant, he rebuilds Vader's burned, mutilated body with the black armored suit from the original trilogy. Palpatine then tells Vader that Padmé was killed in the heat of Vader's anger, breaking what remains of Vader's spirit. Palpatine is last seen watching the original Death Star's construction, with Vader and Wilhuff Tarkin (Wayne Pygram) at his side.

==== Sequel trilogy ====
In the sequel trilogy, set three decades after the events of Return of the Jedi, the First Order has risen from the fallen Empire and seeks to destroy the New Republic, the Resistance, and Luke Skywalker. In the trilogy's first installment, The Force Awakens (2015), Palpatine's voice is heard during a vision that Rey (Daisy Ridley) experiences upon touching Luke and Anakin's lightsaber. In the sequel, The Last Jedi (2017), Luke briefly mentions Palpatine as Darth Sidious while explaining the fall of the Jedi Order to Rey.

Palpatine, again played by McDiarmid, appears in the trilogy's final film, The Rise of Skywalker (2019). Prior to the film's opening, Palpatine threatens revenge against the galaxy, having used the dark side to cheat death. (Note: While The Rise of Skywalker does not explicitly lay out how Palpatine returns, the film proposes an explanation: "dark science, cloning, secrets only the Sith knew". Palpatine himself attributes his return to "unnatural" dark side abilities. The film's novelization reveals that Palpatine had used Darth Plagueis' knowledge to cheat death by transferring his consciousness into a clone body.) This prompts First Order leader and fallen Jedi Kylo Ren (Adam Driver)—the grandson of Anakin and nephew of Luke—to seek him out on the Sith planet Exegol, where a physically impaired Palpatine is supported by machinery. Palpatine reveals himself as the power behind Ren's former master, Snoke (Andy Serkis), whom he created to rule the First Order and lure Ren to the dark side. He then unveils the Final Order, a Sith armada of superlaser-equipped Star Destroyers built by the Sith Eternal. Palpatine offers the Sith fleet to Ren on the condition that he find and kill the galaxy's last remaining Jedi, Rey, who is revealed to be Palpatine's granddaughter. It is subsequently revealed that Palpatine had a son who renounced him; the son and his partner took their daughter Rey to the planet Jakku, assuming lives as "nobodies" to keep her safe. Palpatine's assassin Ochi eventually found Rey's parents and killed them on his orders, but never found Rey.

Near the end of the film, Rey arrives on Exegol to confront Palpatine. Surrounded by his Sith loyalists, Palpatine embodies all the Sith's power. He orders Rey to kill him in anger so his spirit can pass into her, which will allow him to possess her body. Rey refuses, and she and Ren (now the redeemed Ben Solo) confront Palpatine together. Sensing their power as a dyad in the Force, Palpatine absorbs their life energy to rejuvenate his body. He incapacitates Ben and attacks the Resistance fleet with Force lightning. Rey uses the power of the past Jedi to face Palpatine once more; he attacks her with lightning, but Rey deflects it using the Skywalker lightsabers, killing Palpatine and destroying his Sith forces.

=== Television ===
==== The Clone Wars ====
In the 2008 animated film Star Wars: The Clone Wars and the subsequent animated series (set between Attack of the Clones and Revenge of the Sith), Palpatine continues to serve as Supreme Chancellor while his Sith identity orchestrates the Clone Wars behind the scenes. Palpatine was voiced by Ian Abercrombie (from 2008 to his death in 2012), and by Tim Curry (from 2012 to 2014). In the film, Sidious engineers a Separatist plot in which Count Dooku (voiced by Corey Burton) turns Jabba the Hutt (voiced by Kevin Michael Richardson) against the Republic by kidnapping his son Rotta and framing the Jedi for it. Meanwhile, Palpatine suggests that the Republic ally itself with the Hutts. Although Anakin Skywalker (voiced by Mat Lucas) and his Padawan Ahsoka Tano (voiced by Ashley Eckstein) foil the plot, the outcome suits Palpatine's ends: Jabba places Hutt hyperspace routes at the Republic's disposal.

In season two of the TV series, Sidious hires bounty hunter Cad Bane (voiced by Corey Burton) to infiltrate the Jedi Temple and steal a holocron. He then takes a valuable Kyber memory crystal that contains the names of thousands of Force-sensitive younglings – the future of the Jedi Order – from around the galaxy. The final stage of the plot: to bring four Force-sensitive children to Sidious' secret facility on Mustafar. Anakin and Ahsoka again foil the plot, but Bane escapes and all evidence of Sidious' involvement is lost. In season three, Sidious senses Dooku's assassin Asajj Ventress (voiced by Nika Futterman) becoming powerful in the dark side and orders Dooku to eliminate her; he suspects that Dooku is planning to have Ventress assassinate him. Ventress survives and her revenge against Dooku sets off a chain of events including the return of Sidious' former apprentice and Dooku's predecessor, Darth Maul (voiced by Sam Witwer).

In season five, Sidious personally travels to the planet Mandalore to confront Maul, who has become the leader of Death Watch. Sidious kills Maul's brother Savage Opress (voiced by Clancy Brown) before torturing Maul with the intent to make use of his former apprentice. In season six, Sidious goes to lengths to conceal his plan from the Jedi by silencing Clone Trooper Fives from learning of Order 66, and having Dooku wipe out anything tied to the former Jedi Master's connection to the conspiracy.

In the seventh season episode "Shattered", Sidious issues Order 66.

==== Rebels ====
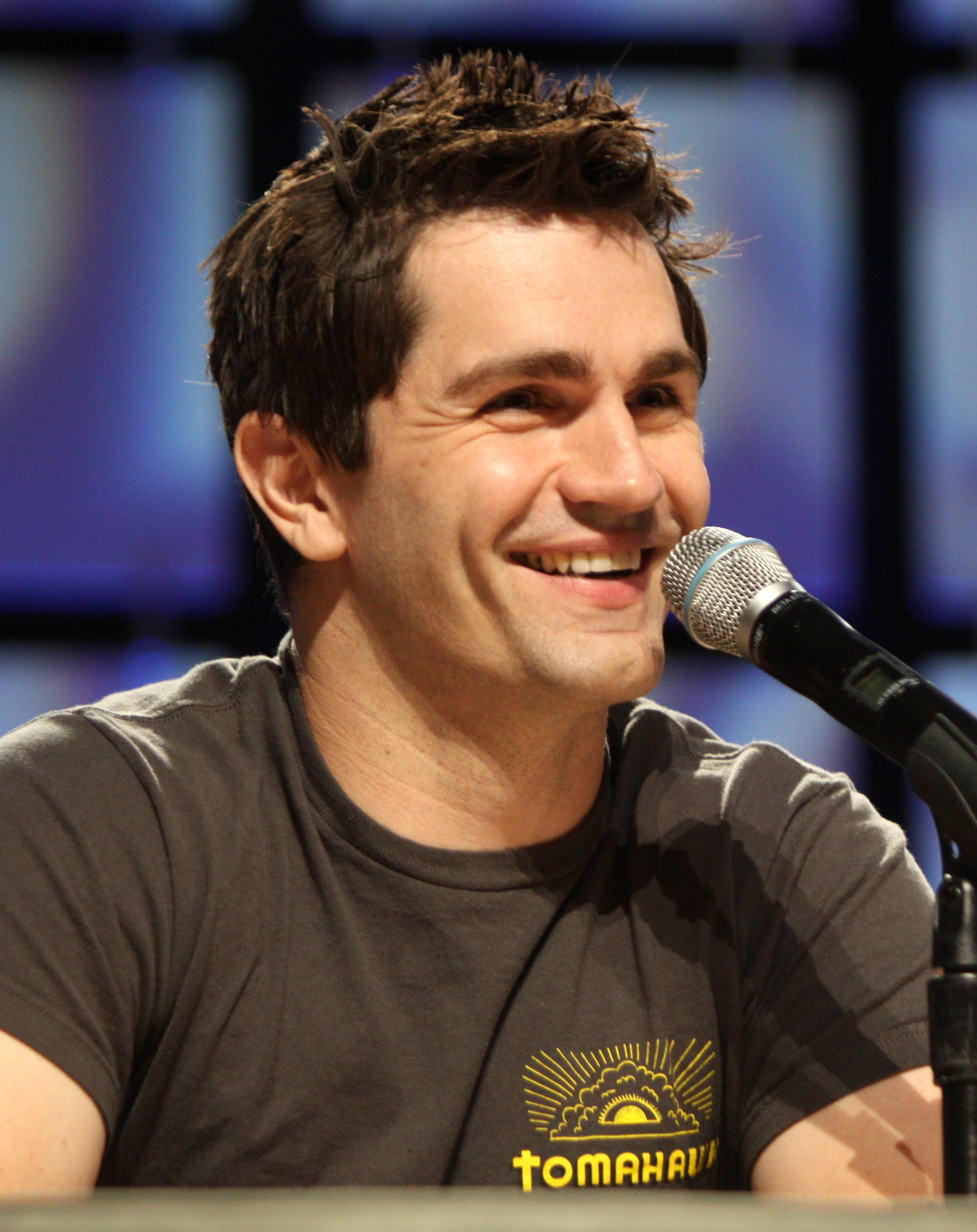
Sam Witwer originally provided the voice for Palpatine in Rebels.

In Star Wars Rebels, set between Revenge of the Sith and A New Hope, Palpatine is portrayed as the Emperor of the Galactic Empire. He briefly appears off-screen at the end of season two's premiere "The Siege of Lothal" (originally voiced by Sam Witwer and later Ian McDiarmid from 2018). Darth Vader informs Palpatine that the Rebel Alliance cell on Lothal has been broken and that Ahsoka Tano is alive and is now helping the Rebels. Palpatine sees this as an opportunity to seek out other remaining Jedi, ordering Vader to dispatch an Inquisitor to hunt down Ahsoka.

Palpatine returns physically in season four (voiced again by McDiarmid). In the episodes "Wolves and a Door" and "A World Between Worlds", he appears as a hologram overseeing the excavation of the Lothal Jedi Temple, which contains a portal to a separate dimension of the Force outside of space and time, which Palpatine considers a 'conduit between the living and the dead' that could give him unrivaled power of the Force itself if he can access it. Shortly after Ezra Bridger (voiced by Taylor Gray) reaches through time and space to rescue Ahsoka from Vader, Palpatine sets up a portal that shows Jedi Master Kanan Jarrus' (voiced by Freddie Prinze Jr.) final moments. While Ezra wants to reach through the portal and rescue Kanan, Ahsoka convinces him not to. Palpatine then reveals himself through the portal and attacks Ezra with Force lightning. However, Ahsoka and Ezra manage to evade him and go their separate ways, thus denying Palpatine full power.

Palpatine later returns in the series finale "Family Reunion - and Farewell". In the episode, Ezra, having surrendered himself to Grand Admiral Thrawn (voiced by Lars Mikkelsen) to protect Lothal, is taken by him to a room containing a reconstructed section of the ruined Jedi Temple and a hologram of Palpatine as he appears in the prequel films. Palpatine, having acknowledged the threat Ezra poses to the Empire, presents himself as a kindly old man and shows Ezra a vision of his dead parents through a doorway, promising that the youth will be with them if he enters it. Ezra is initially mesmerized by Palpatine's promise and goes to enter the door, but finally resists and destroys the reconstructed Jedi Temple and the illusion. Palpatine's hologram emerges from the rubble, flickering to show his true self, and commands his Royal Guards to kill Ezra, though Ezra manages to defeat them and escape. According to series creator Dave Filoni, the events of Rogue One and A New Hope happen shortly after this episode, thus refocusing Palpatine's attention from Ezra and Lothal's liberation to the Rebel Alliance and Luke Skywalker.

==== The Bad Batch ====
Palpatine appears in the first season of the 2021 animated series Star Wars: The Bad Batch. The series is set during (and immediately following) the events of the 2005 film Revenge of the Sith. The series' first episode depicts Palpatine's Senate speech from the film in animated form, using the archive sound of McDiarmid's dialogue. As in the film, Palpatine orders the extermination of the Jedi and declares himself Emperor.

Palpatine appears in season 3, in which he inspects the progress of Project Necromancer's clone experiments under the supervision of Imperial scientist Dr. Hemlock (voiced by Jimmi Simpson).

==== Obi-Wan Kenobi ====
Palpatine appears in the sixth episode of the 2022 series Obi-Wan Kenobi. The series is set ten years after Revenge of the Sith. After Darth Vader is defeated by Obi-Wan Kenobi following their second duel, Palpatine contacts Vader in his Mustafar castle via hologram, questioning Vader's motives and loyalty when Vader reports that he will not rest until Obi-Wan is found. Vader reassures Palpatine that Obi-Wan does not mean anything, reaffirms his commitment to Palpatine and abandons his search.

==== Tales of the Jedi ====
Darth Sidious appears in the fourth episode of the Tales of the Jedi TV series, once again voiced by McDiarmid, talking with Count Dooku (voiced by Corey Burton).

==== Andor ====
While Palpatine does not appear in Andor, he is regularly mentioned in the series, as the plot is largely driven by his political machinations and the formal organization of the Rebel Alliance to counter his ever-growing power in the five years leading up to the Battle of Yavin. After the heist on the Imperial garrison on Aldhani masterminded by Luthen Rael (Stellan Skarsgård) in the sixth episode, Palpatine's mandate to expand Imperial authority and intensify criminal penalties is conveyed to the Imperial Security Bureau (and the audience) in the following episode by Wullf Yularen (Malcolm Sinclair).

One year later in 4 BBY in the first episode of the second season, Orson Krennic (Ben Mendelsohn) heads a project conceived by Palpatine ostensibly to provide sustainable energy to the galaxy (later revealed to be a front for the Death Star), culminating in a massacre of protesters on the planet Ghorman in the eighth episode. In the ninth episode, Palpatine schedules an emergency Senate session but provides instructions to prevent dissident Senators from speaking. This backfires when Senator Bail Organa (Benjamin Bratt) invokes a rule written by Palpatine's own Council allowing him to yield his full time to Mon Mothma (Genevieve O'Reilly), who condemns the Ghorman Massacre as "unprovoked genocide" and denounces Palpatine as a "monster" before evading arrest with the aid of Luthen's spies.

Days before the Battles of Scarif and Yavin in the final three-episode block beginning with "Make It Stop" and ending with the series finale "Jedha, Kyber, Erso", Luthen learns from his spy within the ISB about the Death Star and its centrality to everything enacted by Palpatine or on his behalf up to that point in the series. Major Lio Partagaz (Anton Lesser) commits suicide rather than face Palpatine for his failure in capturing Luthen's assistant Kleya Marki (Elizabeth Dulau) before she can pass this information to the Rebel Alliance, leading directly into the events of Rogue One.

=== Books and comics ===
The first appearance of Palpatine in Star Wars literature was in the prologue of Alan Dean Foster's ghostwritten novelization of the script of A New Hope, published as Star Wars: From the Adventures of Luke Skywalker (1976). His background as a senator of the Republic was explored in James Kahn's novelization of Return of the Jedi.

Palpatine also appears in Rae Carson's novelization of The Rise of Skywalker, which expands upon the film's story. In the book, Palpatine is revealed to have discovered the "secret to immortality" from his former master, Darth Plagueis, using this knowledge to survive after his death in Return of the Jedi. The novelization also describes Palpatine's son as a failed clone of himself. However, the 2021 book Skywalker: A Family at War describes Palpatine's son as an "offshoot of [his] genetic research, not precisely a clone but made of cloned tissue and donated cells."

Star Wars: Lords of the Sith (2015) was one of the first canon spin-off novels to be released in the Disney canon begun in 2014. In it, Vader and Palpatine find themselves hunted by revolutionaries on the Twi'lek home planet Ryloth. In Thrawn (2017), the titular character warns Palpatine of "threats lurking in the Unknown Regions." Chuck Wendig's Aftermath book trilogy reveals that, prior to his death, Palpatine enacted a plan for the remnants of the Empire, intended to be led by his adoptive son Gallius Rax, to retreat to the Unknown Regions, where they formed into the First Order. The dark side was thought to be concentrated in this region, where one Sith cultist believed that Palpatine would be found alive. The 2021 illustrated book Star Wars: The Secrets of the Sith is told from Palpatine's perspective.

Palpatine appears frequently in the comic book series Darth Vader: Dark Lord of the Sith (2017–2018), written by Kieron Gillen and Charles Soule. It is suggested at the end of the series that Palpatine manipulated the Force to impregnate Vader's mother Shmi Skywalker, making him, in essence, Vader's father—although this is left somewhat ambiguous. This builds on the plot point of Anakin's virgin birth introduced in The Phantom Menace, and the claim that a Sith lord "could use the Force to influence the midi-chlorians to create life," as Palpatine tells Anakin in Revenge of the Sith. This would seem to have vaguely incestuous implications for Rey and Ben Solo at the end of The Rise of Skywalker, (Note: According to the film's novelization, their kiss was one of "gratitude, acknowledgement of their connection, celebration that they'd found each other".) but Soule says that "The Dark Side is not a reliable narrator," and a Lucasfilm story group member who collaborated on the comic confirmed that a direct connection between Palpatine and Vader was not their intent.

The character also appears in the final chapter of the comic book Star Wars: The Rise of Kylo Ren (2020), which illustrates Palpatine's manipulation of the young Ben Solo into becoming Kylo Ren.

=== Video games ===
Star Wars Battlefront II adds a canonical tale spanning the destruction of the second Death Star through the events of The Force Awakens. The story takes an Imperial perspective, following an elite squadron known as Inferno Squad, led by Iden Versio, as they help execute Operation: Cinder following the Emperor's death. Operation: Cinder was the ultimate negative sum move carried out by the Galactic Empire as a means of devastating several Imperial planets a few weeks after the Battle of Endor. The operation was part of the "Contingency", a plan devised by Emperor Palpatine to ensure that the Empire and its enemies would not outlive him should he perish. It is the logic of "if I cannot have it, no one can"; echoing Hitler's Nero Decree in 1945 where he ordered the destruction of Germany's own infrastructure. He preferred to see his own country reduced to ash rather than surrender. The plan was put into action following the Emperor's death during the Battle of Endor.

Palpatine's threat of revenge referenced in the opening crawl of The Rise of Skywalker was included in a live event in the video game Fortnite Battle Royale before the film's release. Palpatine was later added to Fortnite as a purchasable cosmetic outfit, as part of the Battle Pass for the Star Wars: Galactic Battle season. The character has appeared in every Lego Star Wars video game to date, including Lego Star Wars: The Skywalker Saga.

King Pig portrays Emperor Palpatine in the video games Angry Birds Star Wars and Angry Birds Star Wars II, known as Emperor Piglatine. In the first game, he appears as the main antagonist and final boss, serving as the ruler of the Pig Empire and confronting the player during the final stages of the game. In the sequel, he returns as a playable character, representing Palpatine's role in the Star Wars prequel trilogy.

== Star Wars Legends ==
Following the acquisition of Lucasfilm by The Walt Disney Company in 2012, most of the licensed Star Wars Expanded Universe material produced between 1977 and 2014 was rebranded as 'Star Wars Legends' and declared non-canonical.

=== Clone Wars ===
Palpatine appears in the Clone Wars micro-series, which is set between Attack of the Clones and Revenge of the Sith. In the first chapter, Palpatine discovers that the InterGalactic Banking Clan has established battle droid factories on the planet Muunilinst. He agrees to send a strike force that includes Anakin Skywalker and suggests that Anakin be given "special command" of Obi-Wan Kenobi's fighters. Yoda and Obi-Wan initially speak against the idea but eventually agree. In the seventh chapter, a holographic image of Sidious appears shortly after Dooku trains the Dark Jedi Asajj Ventress. Sidious orders Ventress to track down and kill Anakin. He remarks to Dooku that Ventress is certain to be defeated, but that the purpose of her mission is to test Anakin. In the final chapters, Sidious orders General Grievous to begin an assault on the galactic capital. Later, Palpatine watches as the Separatist invasion of Coruscant begins. Grievous breaks through the Chancellor's window and attempts to kidnap him, leading to a long chase during which Palpatine is protected by the Jedi Shaak Ti, Roron Corobb and Foul Moudama. After Grievous defeats the Jedi, Palpatine is taken aboard the Invisible Hand, setting the stage for Revenge of the Sith.

=== Books and comics ===
Palpatine made his first major appearance in Star Wars-related comic books in 1991 and 1992, with the Dark Empire series written by Tom Veitch and illustrated by Cam Kennedy. In the series (set six years after Return of the Jedi), Palpatine is resurrected as the Emperor Reborn, or "Palpatine the Undying". His spirit returns from the netherworld of the Force with the aid of Sith ghosts on Korriban and possesses the body of Jeng Droga, one of Palpatine's elite spies and assassins known as the Emperor's Hands. Droga flees to a secret Imperial base on the planet Byss, where the Emperor's advisor Sate Pestage exorcises Palpatine's spirit and channels it into one of many clones created by Palpatine before his death. Palpatine attempts to resume control of the galaxy, but Luke Skywalker, now a senior Jedi Knight, sabotages his plans. Luke destroys most of Palpatine's cloning tanks but is only able to defeat the Emperor with help from Leia Organa Solo, who has received rudimentary Jedi training from Luke. The two repel a Force storm Palpatine had created and turn it back onto him, once again destroying his physical form.

Palpatine's ultimate fate is further chronicled in the Dark Empire II and Empire's End series of comics. The Dark Empire II series, published from 1994 to 1995, details how the Emperor is once again reborn on Byss into a clone body. Palpatine tries to rebuild the Empire as the Rebel Alliance grows weak. In Empire's End (1995), a traitorous Imperial guard bribes Palpatine's cloning supervisor to tamper with the Emperor's stored DNA samples. This causes the clones to deteriorate at a rapid rate. Palpatine tries to possess the body of Anakin Solo, the infant son of Leia Organa and Han Solo, before the clone body dies, but is thwarted once again by Luke Skywalker. Palpatine is killed by a blaster shot fired by Han, but his spirit is captured by the mortally wounded Jedi Empatojayos Brand. When Brand dies, he takes Palpatine's spirit with him into the netherworld of the Force, destroying the Sith Lord once and for all.

Novels and comics published before 1999 focus on Palpatine's role as Galactic Emperor. Shadows of the Empire (1996) by Steve Perry and The Mandalorian Armor (1998) by K. W. Jeter—both set between The Empire Strikes Back and Return of the Jedi—show how Palpatine uses crime lords such as Prince Xizor and bounty hunters like Boba Fett to fight his enemies. In the Jedi Prince series of young-reader novels (1992–1993) by Paul and Hollace Davids, set about a year after Return of the Jedi, a three-eyed mutant named Triclops is revealed to be Palpatine's illegitimate son; he had a son named Ken, the titular "Jedi Prince". Barbara Hambly's novel Children of the Jedi (1995), set eight years after Return of the Jedi, features a woman named Roganda Ismaren who claims that Palpatine fathered her son Irek.

After the release of The Phantom Menace, writers were allowed to begin exploring Palpatine's backstory as a politician and Sith lord. The comic "Marked" by Rob Williams, printed in Star Wars Tales 24 (2005), and Michael Reaves' novel Darth Maul: Shadow Hunter (2001) explain Darth Sidious' relationship with his apprentice Darth Maul. Cloak of Deception (2001) by James Luceno follows Reaves' novel and details how Darth Sidious encourages the Trade Federation to build an army of battle droids in preparation for the invasion of Naboo. Cloak of Deception also focuses on Palpatine's early political career, revealing how he becomes a confidant of Chancellor Finis Valorum and acquainted with Padmé Amidala, newly elected queen of Naboo. Palpatine's role during the Clone Wars as Chancellor of the Republic and Darth Sidious is portrayed in novels such as Matthew Stover's Shatterpoint (2003), Steven Barnes' The Cestus Deception (2004), Sean Stewart's Yoda: Dark Rendezvous (2004), and Luceno's Labyrinth of Evil (2005) and Darth Plagueis (2012).

Following the theatrical release of Revenge of the Sith, Star Wars literature focused on Palpatine's role after the creation of the Empire. John Ostrander's comic Star Wars Republic 78: Loyalties (2005) chronicles how, shortly after seizing power, Emperor Palpatine sends Darth Vader to assassinate Sagoro Autem, an Imperial captain who plans to defect from the Empire. In Luceno's novel Dark Lord: The Rise of Darth Vader (2005) (set shortly after Revenge of the Sith), the Emperor sends Darth Vader to the planet Murkhana to discover why clone troopers there refused to carry out Order 66 against their Jedi generals. Palpatine hopes these early missions will teach Vader what it means to be a Sith and crush any remnants of Anakin Skywalker.

James Luceno's 2012 novel Darth Plagueis depicts Palpatine's early life, prior to the films. The scion of an aristocratic family on Naboo, Palpatine first turns toward the dark side upon meeting the titular Sith lord. Sensing great power in Palpatine, Plageuis takes him on as his Sith apprentice. In the final test of his devotion to the dark side, Palpatine kills his parents and his brother and sister.

=== Video games ===
In The Force Unleashed, the Empire has captured the rebel leaders and holds them on the Death Star. Vader's former apprentice Galen Marek/Starkiller battles his way through the station, defeats Vader and faces the Emperor, who tries to goad him into killing Vader so Starkiller can take his place. Starkiller defeats the Emperor, but spares him. The Emperor then unleashes Force lightning at Starkiller's companion Rahm Kota, but Starkiller absorbs it, sacrificing himself to allow the rebels to escape.

In the noncanonical dark side ending Starkiller kills Vader and is congratulated by the Emperor, who commands him to kill Kota. Starkiller instead attacks the Emperor, who foils his attempt and then crushes him and the rebels with a ship. Starkiller later awakens to find his body being grafted with armor to continue serving the Emperor.

In the downloadable content for The Force Unleashed II, the Rebel Alliance gets defeated at the Battle of Endor. The Emperor then subdues Vader with Force lightning while chastising him for resurrecting his failed apprentice as a clone.

== Characterization ==
According to the prologue of Alan Dean Foster's 1976 novelization of the original Star Wars film,

Aided and abetted by restless, power-hungry individuals within the government, and the massive organs of commerce, the ambitious Senator Palpatine caused himself to be elected President of the Republic. He promised to reunite the disaffected among the people and to restore the remembered glory of the Republic. Once secure in office he declared himself Emperor, shutting himself away from the populace. Soon he was controlled by the very assistants and boot-lickers he had appointed to high office, and the cries of the people for justice did not reach his ears.

In Cloak of Deception, Luceno writes that Palpatine carefully guards his privacy and "others found his reclusiveness intriguing, as if he led a secret life". Despite this, he has many allies in the government. Luceno writes, "What Palpatine lacked in charisma, he made up for in candor, and it was that directness that had led to his widespread appeal in the senate. ... For in his heart he judged the universe on his own terms, with a clear sense of right and wrong." In Terry Brooks' novelization of The Phantom Menace, Palpatine claims to embrace democratic principles. He tells Queen Amidala, "I promise, Your Majesty, if I am elected [chancellor of the Republic], I will restore democracy to the Republic. I will put an end to the corruption that has plagued the Senate." A Visual Dictionary states that he is a self-proclaimed savior. According to the Star Wars Encyclopedia, "[Palpatine's] Empire ... is based on tyranny."

Expanded Universe materials explicitly establish that Palpatine was the apprentice of Darth Plagueis. Palpatine is characterized as "the most powerful practitioner of the Sith ways in modern times." Palpatine is so powerful that he is able to mask his true identity from the Jedi for decades. In the novel Shatterpoint, Mace Windu remarks to Yoda, "A shame [Palpatine] can't touch the Force. He might have been a fine Jedi."

The Star Wars Databank explains that the Force "granted him inhuman dexterity and speed, agility enough to quickly kill three Jedi Masters" (as depicted in Revenge of the Sith). Stover describes the duel between Yoda and Palpatine in his novelization of Revenge of the Sith thus: "From the shadow of a black wing, a small weapon ... slid into a withered hand and spat a flame-colored blade ... When those blades met, it was more than Yoda against Palpatine, more the millennia of Sith against the legions of Jedi; this was the expression of the fundamental conflict of the universe itself. Light against dark. Winner takes all." During the duel, Yoda realizes that Sidious is a superior warrior, and represents a small but powerful Sith Order that had changed and evolved over the years, while the Jedi had not: "He had lost before he started. He had lost before he was born."

According to the Databank and New Essential Guide to Characters, Palpatine possesses great patience and his maneuverings are as a dejarik grandmaster moves pieces on a board. He is depicted as a diabolical genius.

== In popular culture ==
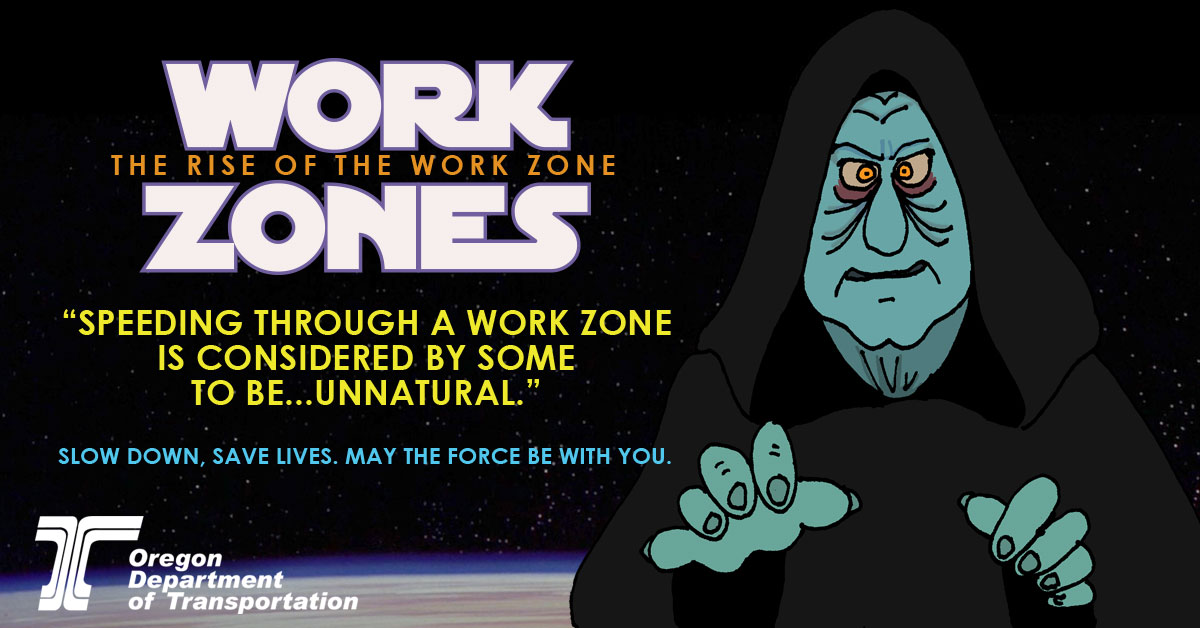
An Oregon Department of Transportation PSA parodying Palpatine

With the premiere of Return of the Jedi and the prequel films and the accompanying merchandising campaign, Palpatine became an icon in American popular culture. Academics have debated the relationship of Palpatine to modern culture. Religion scholars Ross Shepard Kraemer, William Cassidy, and Susan Schwartz compare Palpatine and Star Wars heroes to the theological concept of dualism. They insist, "One can certainly picture the evil emperor in Star Wars as Satan, complete with his infernal powers, leading his faceless minions such as his red-robed Imperial Guards." Lawrence and Jewett argue that Vader killing Palpatine in Return of the Jedi represented "the permanent subduing of evil". However, according to director J. J. Abrams, Palpatine's return in The Rise of Skywalker represented the idea that evil can return as a result of complacency. He said, "I think the idea that if we are not careful, the evil — the ultimate evil — will rise again."

Since Return of the Jedi and the prequel films, Palpatine's name has been invoked as a caricature in politics. A Seattle Post-Intelligencer editorial noted that anti-pork bloggers were caricaturing West Virginia Senator Robert Byrd as "the Emperor Palpatine of pork", with Senator Ted Stevens of Alaska having "clear aspirations to be his Darth Vader." The charge followed a report that linked a secret hold on the Federal Funding Accountability and Transparency Act of 2006 to the two senators. Politicians have made comparisons as well. In 2005, Democratic Senator Frank Lautenberg of New Jersey compared Republican Majority Leader Bill Frist of Tennessee to Palpatine in a speech on the Senate floor, complete with a visual aid.

A Fox News editorial stated "no cultural icon can exist without someone trying to stuff it into a political ideology. The Star Wars saga, the greatest pop culture icon of the last three decades, is no exception... Palpatine's dissolution of the Senate in favor of imperial rule has been compared to Julius Caesar's marginalization of the Roman Senate, Hitler's power-grabs as chancellor on his way to becoming a dictator, Franklin D. Roosevelt's failed court-packing scheme and the creation of a perceived Imperial Presidency in the United States."

=== On the Internet ===
In the mid-late 2010s, Palpatine became the subject of various internet memes, which referenced certain lines of dialogue he spoke in Revenge of the Sith.

Most notably, a screenshot of the character in Revenge of the Sith was posted to Reddit in 2017 and became the most upvoted post in the history of that website for the next three years, amassing over 438 thousand upvotes as of 2025. The post's caption reads: "The Senate. Upvote this so that people see it when they Google 'The Senate'." (Note: In reference to a line spoken by Palpatine in the same movie: "I am the Senate!")
