= Star Wars and History =

2012 book

- Author: Janice Liedl, William J. Astore, Kevin S. Decker, et al.
- Subject: Star Wars, World history
- Publisher: John Wiley & Sons
- Publication date: November 1, 2012
- Publication place: United States
- ISBN: 9780470602003

Star Wars and History is a book published on November 1, 2012, edited by Janice Liedl and Nancy R. Reagin.

The book, authorized by Lucasfilm, discusses the historical events that inspired Star Wars.

== See also ==
- List of Star Wars reference books
