= Star Wars: The Scripts =

Star Wars: The Scripts is a book by George Lucas, Leigh Brackett, and Lawrence Kasdan published by Boxtree in 1995.

== Contents ==
Star Wars: The Scripts contains the full continuity scripts of the wide-screen versions of the films in the original Star Wars trilogy, including previously unseen footage that was used by Fox in September 1995.

== Reception ==
Jonathan Palmer reviewed Star Wars: The Scripts for Arcane magazine, rating it a 3 out of 10 overall. Palmer comments that "There is, to its credit, a well-produced glossy section in the middle with lots of good pictures of colour posters from the films, but does this make it worth [the price]? I don't think so."
