= Steve Sansweet =

American journalist

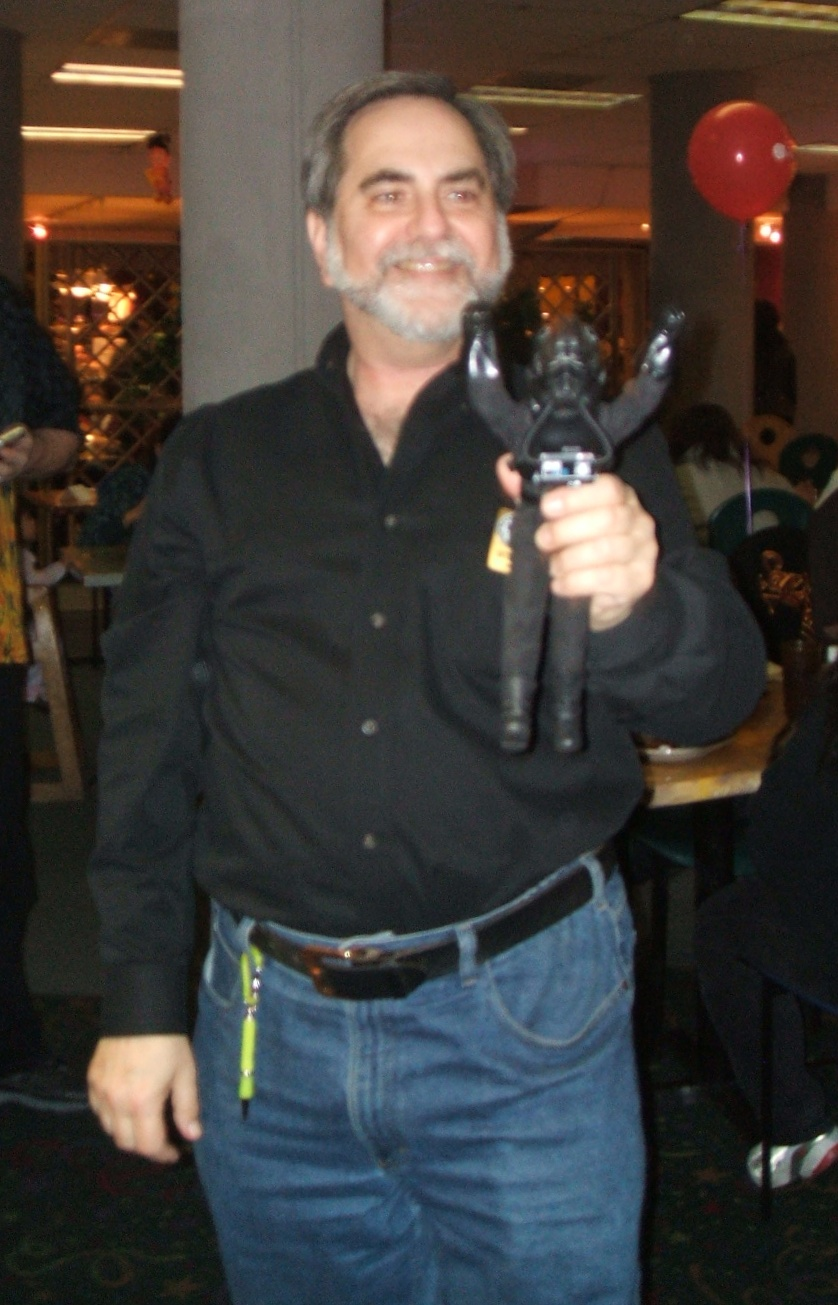
- Steve Sansweet, August 2012
- Born: June 14, 1945 (age 81); Philadelphia, Pennsylvania, U.S.
- Occupations: Author; Collector; Star Wars "ambassador"
- Website: http://ranchoobiwan.org

Stephen J. Sansweet (born June 14, 1945) is the chairman and former president of Rancho Obi-Wan, a nonprofit museum that houses the world's largest collection of Star Wars memorabilia.

Prior to his retirement in April 2011, Sansweet was Director of Content Management and head of Fan Relations at Lucasfilm Ltd. for 15 years, and remains Fan Relations Advisor for the company. He is author or co-author of eighteen books, sixteen of them about Star Wars.

After Sansweet relocated to Northern California to be closer to his new office at Skywalker Ranch, he bought a former chicken ranch and refurbished its barns to house his collection. The property was renamed Rancho Obi-Wan. In September 2013, his collection of an estimated 300,000 items was recognized by the Guinness Book of Records as being the largest of its kind in the world.

== Early life and education ==
Sansweet was born in 1945 and raised in the Wynnefield neighborhood of Philadelphia. According to Sansweet, he knew he wanted to be a writer from age six, when he hand-printed a newsletter and sold copies to neighbors for three cents. School newspapers, magazines, and yearbooks followed, and he became a journalism major at Temple University.

Sansweet says that he got a lot out of his classes, many taught by working journalists. But he got as much out of a unique community of fellow students who put out the four-times-a-week Temple News. There was no better training, from reporting and writing to photography and editing — and even "paste-up" in the composing room to get the offset daily ready for the printer, he adds. He worked on the special issue reporting the assassination of John F. Kennedy; as two-term editor-in-chief a few years later, he called in late-night instructions to hand-print a banner headline announcing a next-day visit to the campus of President Lyndon Johnson.

=== Journalism career ===
Between his junior and senior years, Sansweet got a then-rare summer internship at The Philadelphia Inquirer, where he worked the night police beat; he graduated magna cum laude and was named an Outstanding Journalism Graduate at Temple. In 2009, he was inducted into Temple's Media Hall of Excellence. Immediately after graduating, he went to work full-time for the Inquirer. During this time, Sansweet served a six-year stint in the U.S. Air Force Reserve, transferring to the Air National Guard.

In early 1969, Sansweet became a reporter for The Wall Street Journal. After working in the paper's Philadelphia and Montreal bureaus, Sansweet was transferred to Los Angeles, where he covered the gaming industry, aerospace, banking, and Hollywood. He helped break the first stories on massive foreign bribery by U.S.-based multinationals and was part of a journalism team that won the 1977 Sigma Delta Chi Public Service Award; he was a Loeb Award finalist in 1990.

Sansweet was a lecturer in business journalism at the University of Southern California in the mid-1980s, teaching a course that he created. He became the Wall Street Journal's Los Angeles bureau chief in 1987, a position he kept until 1996 when he made a leap of faith and "followed his bliss" — and passion – to become Director of Specialty Marketing at Lucasfilm Ltd. His title later changed to Director of Content Management and Head of Fan Relations.

=== Star Wars ===
Sansweet turned his love of the Star Wars saga into a second career, acting as Lucasfilm's liaison to fans worldwide, and their liaison to the company. He did presentations at well over 100 conventions in the U.S. and many more internationally from the U.K., France, Spain, and Germany, to Australia, Japan, Mexico, and Finland. Sansweet appeared on more than 50 hours of Star Wars collectibles programming on QVC in the last half of the 1990s, and has amassed the world's largest private collection of Star Wars memorabilia, housed in a 9,000-square-foot (840 m^{2}) converted chicken barn in Sonoma County, Calif. Not abandoning his love of writing, Sansweet has eighteen books to his credit, sixteen of them on Star Wars, including the 1.2 million word Complete Star Wars Encyclopedia in 2008 and 2012's Star Wars: The Ultimate Action Figure Collection.

It was announced on October 20, 2010, that Sansweet would be stepping down as head of fan relations effective April 2011. He stated via press release: "Nearly 15 years ago I left my post as Los Angeles Bureau Chief of the Wall Street Journal to follow my bliss and take a 'one-year job' as Lucasfilm's Star Wars ambassador," said Sansweet. "Now it's time for another change and new challenges, while still maintaining an active role in the Star Wars fan community."

In June 2017, Sansweet said that Rancho Obi-Wan was a victim of theft and that over 100 items from his collection have been stolen, "The majority of them vintage U.S. and foreign carded action figures, many of them rare and important pieces." Reportedly, several of those pieces have already been, "Resold or professionally appraised for a total of more than $200,000." According to Sansweet, a man named Carl Edward Cunningham, whom Sansweet refers to as, "A good and trusted friend," surrendered to police at the end of March 2017, but is currently out on bail pending additional hearings.

== Bibliography ==
- The Punishment Cure (1976) — a nonfiction book about aversion therapy, not related to Star Wars or science-fiction
- Science Fiction Toys And Models (1980)
- STAR WARS: From Concept To Screen To Collectible (1992)
- Tomart's Price Guide To Star Wars Collectibles (1994, revised 1997)
- Quotable Star Wars: I'd Just as Soon Kiss a Wookiee (1996)
- Star Wars Encyclopedia (1998)
- Star Wars Scrapbook: The Essential Collection (1998)
- The Pocket Manual of Star Wars Collectibles (1998)
- The Star Wars Masterpiece Edition: Anakin Skywalker/The Story of Darth Vader (1998)
- The Star Wars Masterpiece Edition: C-3PO/Tales of the Golden Droid (1999)
- Star Wars: The Action Figure Archive (1999)
- Star Wars Chronicles: The Prequels (with Pablo Hidalgo) (2005)
- The Star Wars Poster Book (2005)
- The Star Wars Vault (2007)
- The Complete Star Wars Encyclopedia (2008)
- Star Wars: 1,000 Collectibles (2009)
- Star Wars: The Ultimate Action Figure Collection (2012)
