= Simon Beecroft =

British author

Simon Beecroft is a British author. His best known book is the New York Times bestselling book Lego Star Wars: The Visual Dictionary, which has sold more than 2,000,000 copies. and which in 2016 is held in more than 1000 libraries. In all, he has written more than 30 other books, primarily for children. Many of his books are about the Star Wars Universe and are written in non-fiction style.

Selected works include Star Wars The Clone Wars: Watch Out For Jabba the Hutt, Star Wars: Luke Skywalker’s Amazing Story, The Star Wars Character Encyclopedia, and Star Wars: Beware the Dark Side, published by Dorling Kindersley (DK). Beecroft is also an editor at DK. and is director of the company's licensing division.

He has also written books on subjects as diverse as dinosaurs, monsters, extreme weather, future technology, Nelson Mandela, Power Rangers, and the Fantastic Four.

== Personal ==
Beecroft lives in London, England, with his wife, Katie, and two children.
