= Greetings from E Street =

2006 book by Robert Santelli

Greetings From E Street: The Story of Bruce Springsteen and the E Street Band
- Cover
- Author: Robert Santelli
- Language: English
- Genre: Non-Fiction, Biographical
- Publisher: Chronicle Books
- Publication date: September 28, 2006
- Publication place: United States
- Pages: 98 pp
- ISBN: 0-8118-5348-9

Greetings From E Street: The Story of Bruce Springsteen and the E Street Band is a book written by Robert Santelli, published in 2006. It chronicles the large career of the E Street Band, as well as details about their solo projects.

== Contents ==
Chapter 1: Directions to E Street
Chapter 2: E Street Rising
Chapter 3: Running on E Street
Chapter 4: High Times on E Street
Chapter 5: E Street on the Map
Chapter 6: E Street: An International Address
Chapter 7: E Street at the Crossroads
Chapter 8: E Street Forever
