= Star Wars: The Essential Guide to Characters =

- Author: Andy Mangels
- Publisher: Del Rey Books
- Publication date: October 24, 1995
- Pages: 199
- ISBN: 978-0345395351

Star Wars: The Essential Guide To Characters is a book by Andy Mangels published by Del Rey Books on October 24, 1995.

== Contents ==
Star Wars: The Essential Guide To Characters is book that lists characters alphabetically, including a line drawing for each character, and information such as height, preferred weapons and political alignment, and a biography.

== Reception ==
Andy Butcher reviewed Star Wars: The Essential Guide To Characters for Arcane magazine, rating it a 5 out of 10 overall. Butcher comments that "although the biographies are somewhat disappointing - for the most part just detailing the actions of the character in the films and not really revealing anything new they do summarise the plots of the various books and comic stories. It's this that might make Star Wars: The Essential Guide To Characters worthy of purchase."

== Reviews ==
- Review by Pam Meek (1996) in Absolute Magnitude, Fall 1996
- Magia i Miecz #65 (May 1999) (Polish)

== See also ==
- Star Wars: The Essential Guide to Vehicles and Vessels
