= Star Wars: The Essential Guide to Vehicles and Vessels =

1995 book

- Author: Bill Smith
- Publisher: Boxtree
- Publication date: 1995

Star Wars: The Essential Guide To Vehicles and Vessels is a book by Bill Smith published by Boxtree in 1995.

== Contents ==
Star Wars: The Essential Guide To Vehicles and Vessels is a book which details 100 vehicles and spacecraft that appear in the Star Wars films, the graphic novels and the series of books.

== Reception ==
Paul Pettengale reviewed Star Wars: The Essential Guide To Vehicles and Vessels for Arcane magazine, rating it a 4 out of 10 overall. Pettengale comments that "the casual Star Wars fan, and even die-hard enthusiasts will find little to further their knowledge of the Star Wars universe in this tome. Detailed it may be, but ultimately, it's stale and rather boring."

== Reviews ==
- Review by Don D'Ammassa (1996) in Science Fiction Chronicle, #190 October 1996
- Review by Andy Sawyer (1997) in Foundation, #69 Spring 1997

== See also ==
- Star Wars: The Essential Guide to Characters
