= Peter Askin =

American film director, producer and screenwriter

- Born: 1940 (age 85–86)
- Education: Middlebury College; Columbia University
- Occupations: Actor, director, producer, screenwriter
- Years active: 1986–present
- Known for: Trumbo (2007)
- Notable work: Hedwig and the Angry Inch (musical); Company Man (2000); Salt in My Soul (2022)
- Family: Joseph Durst (maternal grandfather)

Peter Askin (born 1940) is an American actor, director, producer and screenwriter best known for directing the 2007 film Trumbo, a documentary about the Oscar-winning Hollywood screenwriter Dalton Trumbo who was blacklisted for being a member of the Hollywood Ten. For the film, he worked closely with Trumbo's son, Christopher Trumbo.

== Biography ==
Born to a Jewish family, Askin is the son of Alma Askin, the daughter of Joseph Durst, the founder of the Durst Organization and member of one of the most prominent real estate families in New York City in the 20th century. He was educated at Middlebury College and Columbia University. He trained under Wynn Handman at The American Place Theatre in New York City. Askin made his debut in 1986 with Down an Alley Filled with Cats. Askin was the screenwriter for such films as Company Man (which he also co-directed) and Smithereens, and he directed and produced the musical Hedwig and the Angry Inch. Askin operates the Off-Broadway Westside Theatre. Askin is the Principal Producer of New York-based film and entertainment company Reno Productions. Both fictional movies and documentaries are produced. In 2022 Askin released Salt in My Soul.
