= Joby Harold =

British film director and screenwriter

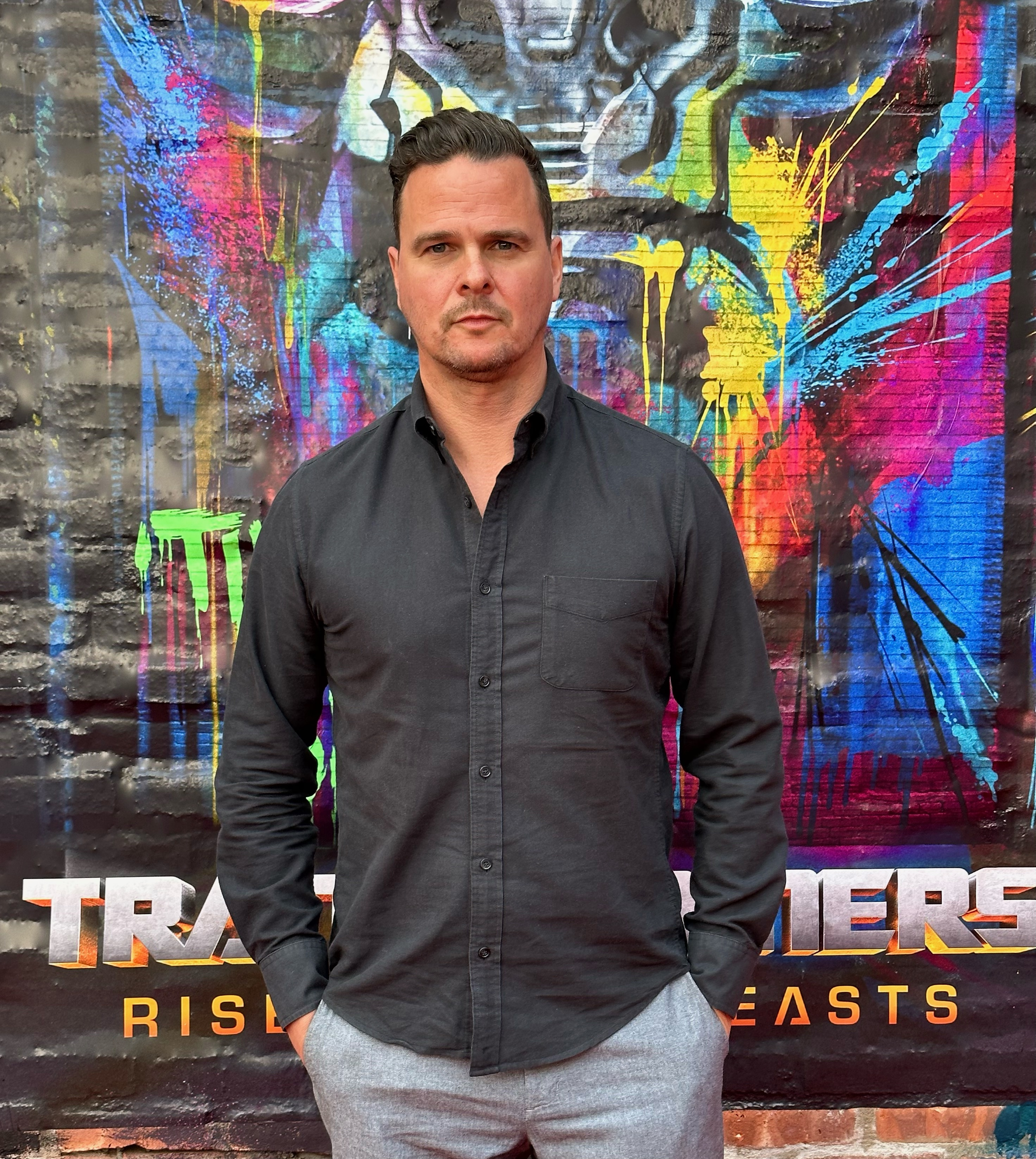
Joby Harold (2023)

Joby Harold is an English screenwriter, producer and director who runs Safehouse Pictures with his wife and producing partner, Tory Tunnell. The company was co-founded in 2005.

== Career ==
Harold's latest projects include Paramount's Novocaine starring Jack Quaid, Amber Midthunder, Ray Nicholson, and directed by Dan Berk and Robert Olsen. Safehouse recently produced the A24 documentary Andre is an Idiot, which received a standing ovation at its premiere at the Sundance film festival where it was in dramatic competition. Harold's projects are the upcoming films Space Mountain and Atlas starring Jennifer Lopez, Simu Liu, and Sterling K. Brown both of which he will be producing alongside Tunnell. He is also working on Monarch: Legacy of Monsters with Legendary starring Kurt Russell, Wyatt Russell, Ren Watabe, Anna Sawai, and Kiersey Clemons. Harold is developing the movie I.F. with Mike Mitchell attached to direct and Tiffany Haddish set to star.

Recently, he wrote and Executive Produced the series Obi-Wan Kenobi for Disney+ and also worked on Transformers: Rise of the Beasts, the last in the live action Transformers film series, for Paramount Pictures as a sequel to Bumblebee, along with a sci-fi thriller Cloaker for Warner Bros., which Safehouse Pictures is producing. Previously, he executive produced John Wick: Chapter 3 – Parabellum, after writing on John Wick: Chapter 2. He also executive produced Edge of Tomorrow for Doug Liman, starring Tom Cruise and Emily Blunt as well as co-writing King Arthur: Legend of the Sword starring Charlie Hunnam and Jude Law, which he and Tory Tunnell produced under their Safehouse banner. He also wrote a draft for the upcoming superhero movie The Flash, as part of the DC Extended Universe which Matthew Vaughn and Robert Zemeckis were formally circling to direct, followed by Sam Raimi, Marc Webb, and Phil Lord and Chris Miller. He co-wrote the zombie movie Army of the Dead, alongside director Zack Snyder and Shay Hatten, which was released on Netflix in May 2021.

His company Safehouse Pictures is producing several projects including the Battle of Britain for director Ridley Scott, Liberators with Michael B. Jordan attached to star, Patricia Arquette’s directorial debut Love Canal, and the feature adaptation of Space Invaders. In television, Harold produced the female drama Spinning Out at Netflix, starring January Jones and Kaya Scodelario. She previously was a partner with Weed Road Pictures, until they struck a deal with Sony in 2015.

He previously executive produced the WGN series Underground. Harold broke into a business in 2005, writing and directing the film Awake for The Weinstein Company, starring Hayden Christensen, Jessica Alba, Terrence Howard and Lena Olin, which Tunnell also produced.

In December 2025, Legendary Entertainment and Apple TV named Harold as the showrunner of an untitled spin-off series set in the Monsterverse; Harold also oversees the Monsterverse on the Apple TV side. Wyatt Russell is set to reprise the role of a young Lee Shaw from Monarch: Legacy of Monsters (which Harold also executive produces) and will follow Shaw as he attempts to stop the Soviet Union from unleashing a new Titan on the U.S. The series is also to feature Godzilla, with Hiro Matsuoka and Takemasa Arita serving as executive producers on behalf of Toho, the owners of Godzilla.

== Filmography ==
=== Film ===
Year	Title	Producer	Writer	Director(s)	Notes
2007	Awake	No	Yes	Himself	
2017	King Arthur: Legend of the Sword	Yes	Yes	Guy Ritchie	
2021	Army of the Dead	No	Yes	Zack Snyder	
2021	Guzman of the Dead 420	No	Yes	Zack Snyder	Short film
2023	Transformers: Rise of the Beasts	No	Yes	Steven Caple Jr.	
2023	The Flash	No	Story	Andy Muschietti	
2024	Atlas	Yes	No	Brad Peyton	
2025	Novocaine	Yes	No	Dan Berk; Robert Olsen	

Executive producer

Year	Title	Notes
2014	Edge of Tomorrow	Also script revisions
2016	My Blind Brother	
2018	Robin Hood	
2019	John Wick: Chapter 3 – Parabellum	Also script revisions
2025	André Is an Idiot	Documentary film

=== Television series ===
Year(s)	Title	Executive producer	Writer	Notes	Network
2016–2017	Underground	Yes	No	20 episodes	WGN America
2020	Spinning Out	Yes	No	10 episodes	Netflix
2022	Obi-Wan Kenobi	Yes	Yes	6 episodes	Disney+
2023–present	Monarch: Legacy of Monsters	Yes	No	20 episodes	Apple TV+ / Apple TV
