= Christopher Trumbo =

American dramatist (1940–2011)

Christopher Trumbo (September 25, 1940 – January 8, 2011) was an American television writer, screenwriter and playwright. Trumbo was considered an expert on the McCarthy-era Hollywood blacklist. His father, screenwriter Dalton Trumbo, was blacklisted by Hollywood for nearly a decade for refusing to testify to Congress, as one of a group known as The Hollywood Ten.

== Early life ==
Trumbo was born on September 25, 1940, to Dalton and Cleo Trumbo, in Los Angeles, where he was also raised. Trumbo was seven years old when his father was called before the House Un-American Activities Committee in 1947. His father spent ten months in prison before being released in 1951. The family moved to Mexico City to share a place with the screenwriter Hugo Butler, who was also blacklisted, and his family. The Trumbos returned to California after two years in Mexico and settled in Highland Park.

Trumbo graduated from Franklin High School in the Highland Park neighborhood of Los Angeles. He enrolled at Columbia University. He took a year off from Columbia to work as an assistant director on the 1960 film Exodus, adapted from the novel written by Leon Uris; the screenplay was written by his father, Dalton Trumbo, and the film was directed by Otto Preminger. Trumbo received a bachelor's degree from Columbia College in 1964.

== Career ==
Trumbo began working as a television and film screenwriter in 1967. Trumbo co-wrote the film The Don Is Dead (1973), starring Anthony Quinn, as well as the John Wayne film Brannigan (1975). In 1974, he was the co-creator with Michael Butler of the short-lived ABC police drama Nakia, and he also wrote for the series. In 1978, Trumbo wrote the television film Ishi: The Last of His Tribe, in which he co-credited his father, who died in 1976. Trumbo's other credits included television episodes of Falcon Crest, Ironside and Quincy, M.E..

Trumbo wrote a play based on his father's blacklist-era letters, called Trumbo: Red, White and Blacklisted. The play, which focuses on Dalton Trumbo's blacklist experience through his personal letters, was adapted as an off-Broadway production directed by Peter Askin. Askin's Trumbo: Red, White and Blacklisted, which starred Nathan Lane as Dalton Trumbo and Gordon MacDonald as the narrator, opened at the Westside Theatre in New York City. The production ran for approximately one year. Lane departed the production and several well-known actors took on the role of Dalton Trumbo, including Chris Cooper, Gore Vidal, Richard Dreyfuss, F. Murray Abraham, Bill Irwin and Brian Dennehy. Dennehy later starred in a national tour of the play.

Christopher Trumbo and Peter Askins collaborated to create the film Trumbo (2007), which was also based on Dalton Trumbo's letters. The film combined documentary footage with performances by Nathan Lane, Brian Dennehy, Liam Neeson, Donald Sutherland and Paul Giamatti.

Trumbo was considered an expert on the Hollywood blacklist era. He was often cited in books and appeared in documentaries concerning the subject, including the seven-part Moguls and Movie Stars, which aired on Turner Classic Movies in 2010. Trumbo was writing a history of the Hollywood blacklist at the time of his death in 2011.

== Death ==
Trumbo died of cancer in hospice care at his home in Ojai, California, on January 8, 2011, at the age of 70, the same age at which his father died. He was survived by his wife, Nancy Escher; his sisters, Nikola Trumbo and Mitzi Trumbo. Before he died, he requested that his father receive full credit for his work on Roman Holiday, which won an Oscar. On December 19, 2011, the Writers Guild credited Dalton Trumbo with the screenplay posthumously.
