= Runaway (2005 film) =

- Film poster
- Directed by: Tim McCann
- Written by: Bill True
- Produced by: Alan Klingenstein
- Starring: Aaron Stanford; Robin Tunney; Peter Gerety; Zack Savage; Melissa Leo; Michael Gaston
- Release date: April 26, 2005 (Tribeca)
- Country: United States
- Language: English

Runaway is a 2005 film directed by Tim McCann. It is about two siblings, Michael and Dylan Adler, twenty-one and eight years old respectively, who run away from home and attempt to start a new life because of a pedophile father. Michael, who had been previously molested by his father, tries to protect his brother from their dad.

Runaway was written by Bill True and won the Best Narrative Feature award at the 2005 Austin Film Festival.

The film was produced by Alan Klingenstein.

== Cast ==
- Aaron Stanford as Michael Adler
- Robin Tunney as Carly
- Phillip Blancero as Customer in Mo's
- Karla Cary as Customer in Mo's
- Anthony Corrado as Motel Manager
- Jennifer Dempster as News Reporter
- Tanya Ferro as Police Officer
- Michael Gaston as Jesse Adler
- Peter Gerety as Mo
- Jason Gervais as Police Officer
- Robert Grcywa as Bert
- James W. Harrison III as Quarrelling Meth Addict
- Andrew D. Jones as Police Officer
- Ray Kennedy as Police Officer
- Terry Kinney as Dr. Maxim
- Brian Kozloski as Police Officer
- Melissa Leo as Lisa Adler
- Patrick McCulloch as Police Officer
- Smokey Nelson as Quarreling Meth Addict
- Zack Savage as Dylan
- Bill Wolff as Eyewitness on TV
- Danny Waer as Police Officer
