= King Arthur: Legend of the Sword =

2017 film by Guy Ritchie

- British theatrical release poster
- Directed by: Guy Ritchie
- Screenplay by: Joby Harold; Guy Ritchie; Lionel Wigram
- Story by: David Dobkin; Joby Harold
- Produced by: Akiva Goldsman; Joby Harold; Tory Tunnell; Steve Clark-Hall; Guy Ritchie; Lionel Wigram
- Starring: Charlie Hunnam; Àstrid Bergès-Frisbey; Djimon Hounsou; Aidan Gillen; Jude Law; Eric Bana
- Cinematography: John Mathieson
- Edited by: James Herbert
- Music by: Daniel Pemberton
- Production companies: Warner Bros. Pictures; Village Roadshow Pictures; RatPac-Dune Entertainment; Weed Road Pictures; Safehouse Pictures; Ritchie/Wigram Productions
- Distributed by: Roadshow Films (Australia and New Zealand); Warner Bros. Pictures (International)
- Release dates: 8 May 2017 (TCL Chinese Theatre); 12 May 2017 (United States); 19 May 2017 (United Kingdom)
- Running time: 126 minutes
- Countries: Australia; United Kingdom; United States
- Language: English
- Budget: $175 million
- Box office: $148.7 million

King Arthur: Legend of the Sword is a 2017 epic fantasy action-adventure film directed by Guy Ritchie, who co-wrote the film with Joby Harold and Lionel Wigram from a story by Harold and David Dobkin, inspired by Arthurian legends. The film tells the origin story of King Arthur, played by Charlie Hunnam, a man who discovers his lineage after taking the sword Excalibur from the stone in which it was lodged and teams with a group of rebels to fight against the tyrannical king Vortigern, played by Jude Law. Àstrid Bergès-Frisbey, Djimon Hounsou, Aidan Gillen, and Eric Bana star in supporting roles.

King Arthur: Legend of the Sword premiered at the TCL Chinese Theater on 8 May 2017 and was theatrically released on 12 May 2017 in the United States and 19 May 2017 in the United Kingdom. The film received mixed reviews and grossed $148.7 million worldwide against its $175 million production budget. Originally, the film was meant to be the first in a six-film franchise, but the planned sequels were cancelled after it underperformed at the box office and lost Warner Bros. Pictures and Village Roadshow Pictures over $150 million.

== Plot ==
"For centuries man & mage lived side by side in peace until the rise of the mage sorcerer Mordred, turning his dark ambition against man, he marches on the last remaining stronghold...Camelot" –Opening caption

Mordred the warlock and his armies lay siege to Camelot. Uther Pendragon, the king of the Britons, infiltrates Mordred's lair during the attack and beheads him with the help of a unique sword forged by Merlin, saving Camelot. Uther's brother Vortigern—who covets the throne—orchestrates a coup and sacrifices his wife Elsa to Syrens in order to become a Demon Knight. He kills Uther's wife Igraine and defeats Uther; Uther's son Arthur escapes by boat and ends up in Londinium. Taken in by prostitutes, he becomes a tough and sophisticated minor chieftain. However, Arthur is plagued by nightmares of the night that his parents died without seeing who attacked them.

Vortigern rules Britain cruelly and dedicates resources to building a tower near the castle. When the water surrounding the castle recedes, revealing a sword in a stone, he has all the men in the city taken to it in an attempt to remove it. Arthur is able to evade capture with the help of the prostitutes but is eventually caught. He is taken to the stone where he removes the sword but is overwhelmed by its power and passes out. In captivity, Vortigern explains Arthur's lineage and the sword's significance to him before planning the boy's execution.

Meanwhile, a mage identifying herself as an acolyte of Merlin presents herself to Uther's former general, Sir Bedivere. At Arthur's planned execution, the mage creates a diversion while Bedivere's men rescue Arthur. Taken to Bedivere's hideout, Arthur initially refuses to help them, not believing that he is king. The mage persuades Bedivere to take Arthur to a realm called the "Darklands" where he sees a vision of how the Demon Knight, revealed to be Vortigern, killed his mother. He also witnesses his father sacrifice himself to save Arthur and entomb the sword in stone made of his own body, making him realize that he is indeed the rightful king. Arthur learns Vortigern was responsible for persuading Mordred to attack Camelot, having grown jealous of Uther's popularity and wanting the throne for himself. He builds the tower to increase his own magical powers.

Arthur and the rebels chip away at Vortigern's army and eventually plan an assassination attempt. Vortigern eludes the assassination, and a battle ensues. Arthur escapes with his friend Back Lack's son Blue, but several of his men are killed and one is captured as Back Lack is killed by Vortigern. Frustrated with the situation, Arthur attempts to throw the sword into a lake, but the Lady of the Lake returns it and shows him a vision of England's future under Vortigern's rule. Coming to terms with his responsibility, Arthur reunites with Bedivere and they return to their hideout. However, because their captured man revealed its location under torture, the mage and Blue had been captured and all other rebels killed. An emissary from Vortigern instructs Arthur to surrender that day at the castle.

Bedivere brings the sword to Vortigern at the castle in exchange for the mage, indicating that Arthur is powerless without the sword. Arthur promises to surrender himself the next day in exchange for Blue. Before riding to the castle, the mage injects him with special snake venom to protect him from a surprise attack she has in store. When Arthur confronts Vortigern, a giant snake attacks the castle under the control of the mage, saving Arthur. However, Vortigern is covered in the blood of a snake that tries to attack him, providing him protection from the giant snake. As Bedivere's rebels begin their attack, Arthur reclaims his sword and follows Vortigern into the tower. Needing help from the moat hags once more, Vortigern sacrifices his daughter Princess Catia to become again the Demon Knight and is confronted by Arthur. After a brutal fight, Arthur has a vision of his father passing the sword of Excalibur on to him, enabling him to defeat Vortigern. As Vortigern dies, Arthur consoles him and leaves his body behind. In the aftermath, the rebels are victorious and celebrate.

After reclaiming his rightful throne, Arthur knights his friends and begins construction of his Round Table.

== Cast ==
- Charlie Hunnam as King Arthur, Uther's son, Vortigern's nephew, Catia's cousin and the would-be king of Britain who was raised by prostitutes.
- Àstrid Bergès-Frisbey as the Mage, a woman working for Merlin who supports Arthur and the resistance.
- Djimon Hounsou as Sir Bedivere, the leader of the resistance and a former knight of Uther.
- Aidan Gillen as Goosefat Bill, a skilled archer, Bedivere's friend, a former knight of Uther and a member of the resistance, who later resumes his identity as Sir William.
- Mikael Persbrandt as Greybeard, a Viking, who has deals with Vortigern.
- Jude Law as Vortigern, Uther's brother, Elsa's husband, Catia's father, Arthur's uncle and the tyrannical and ruthless king of Britain. He is able to transform himself into a demonic knight.
- Eric Bana as Uther Pendragon, Vortigern's brother, Arthur's father and the previous king of Britain.
- Annabelle Wallis as Maggie, a member of Vortigern's court, who helps the resistance.
- Peter Ferdinando as Earl of Mercia.
- Kingsley Ben-Adir as Wet Stick, Arthur and Back Lack's childhood friend who is later knighted by Bedivere under his real name as Sir Tristan.
- Neil Maskell as Back Lack, Arthur and Wet Stick's childhood friend and Blue's father who helps the resistance.
- Geoff Bell as Mischief John.
- Freddie Fox as Rubio, a member of the resistance, who is later forced to give away the hideout to Vortigern under torture.
- Katie McGrath as Elsa, Vortigern's wife.
- Lorraine Bruce, Eline Powell and Hermione Corfield as Syrens
- Craig McGinlay as Percy, another of Arthur's friends who is later knighted as Sir Percival.
- Tom Wu as Kung Fu George, Arthur's Chinese friend and teacher who owns a martial arts school and is later knighted as Sir George.
- Poppy Delevingne as Igraine, Uther's wife.
- Millie Brady as Princess Catia, Vortigern's daughter, Uther's niece, and Arthur's cousin.
- Bleu Landau as Blue, the son of Back Lack who is taken care of by his father and Arthur.
- Jacqui Ainsley as Lady of the Lake
- David Beckham as Trigger, a guard, who oversees the prisoners that attempt to pull Excalibur from the stone.
- Michael McElhatton as Jack's Eye
- Barney Walsh as Young Arthur 19 yrs

== Production ==
=== Development ===
After 2004's King Arthur, Warner Bros. Pictures made multiple attempts to make a new film based on Arthurian legend: one was a remake of Excalibur (1981), directed by Bryan Singer, while the other was a film titled Arthur & Lancelot, which would have starred Kit Harington and Joel Kinnaman in the title roles respectively. Warner Bros. worried that neither name was big enough, and attempted to replace both actors with more profitable ones, before eventually dropping the project altogether.

Warner's next attempt to create a new King Arthur film was an attempt to create an Arthurian cinematic universe which would span six films, following different characters before their eventual team up. For this endeavour they hired director Guy Ritchie, who had himself wanted to make a King Arthur movie for several years. According to The Guardian, the script soon became "a strange Frankenstein's monster-style screenplay" incorporating elements from several of the unproduced Arthurian scripts.

=== Writing ===
Bergès-Frisbey's character was originally intended to be Guinevere. During production, the connection to Guinevere was dropped and the character became simply "the Mage". In an interview with Den of Geek, Hunnam ascribes the change to "partly the film, and partly the actor dictating that is [sic] was going to be something different, and Guy having the confidence and versatility to just roll with it and realise that what he intended wasn't going to work, and him recognising the value of that being something else."

=== Casting ===
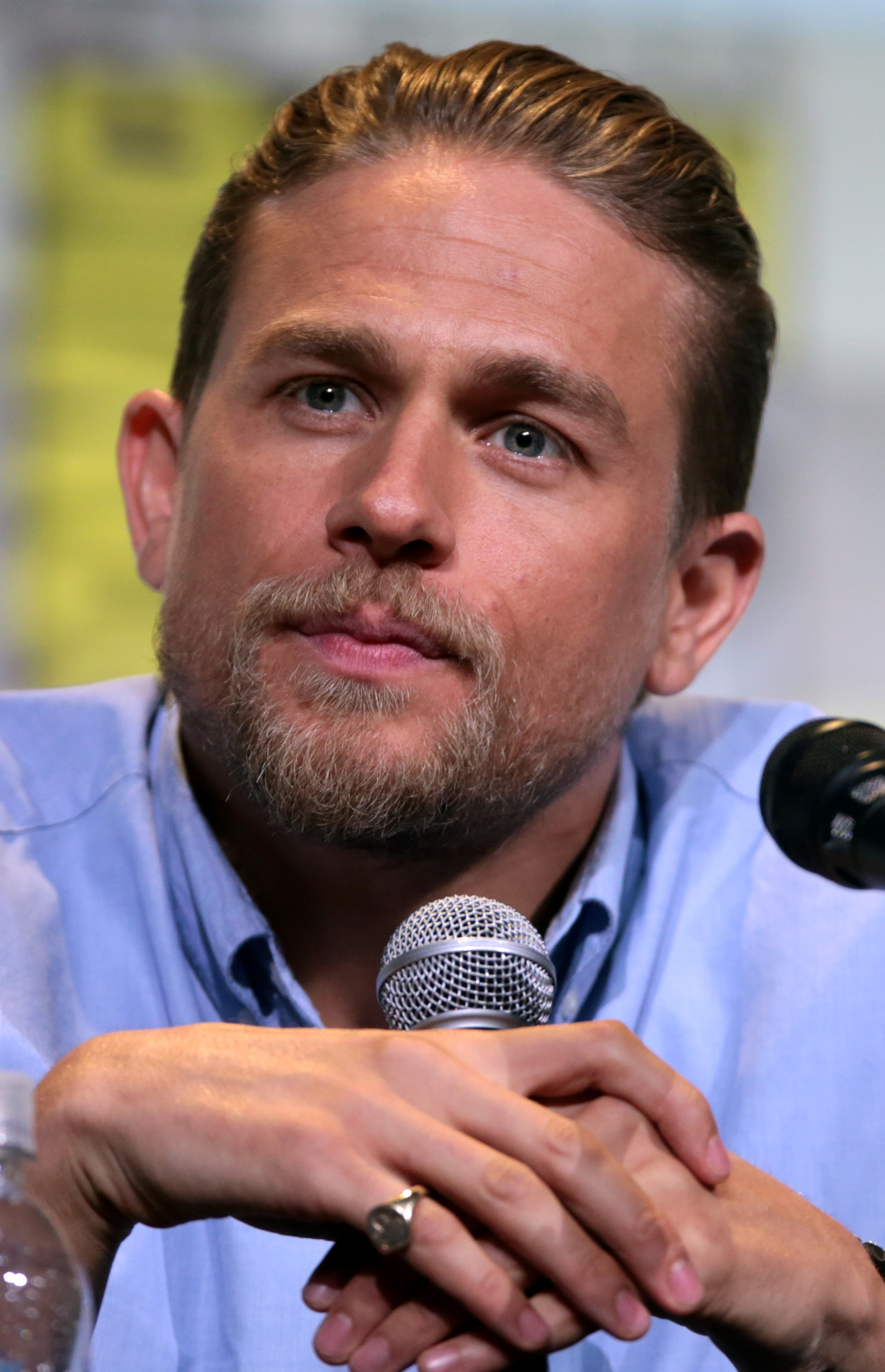
Hunnam at the 2016 San Diego Comic-Con, to promote King Arthur: Legend of the Sword.

In August 2014, Charlie Hunnam, Ritchie's choice for the role, was cast to play King Arthur. Elizabeth Olsen was in talks for the female lead, but on 18 September, Àstrid Bergès-Frisbey landed the role instead. On 14 November, Jude Law was in talks to play the lead villain role in the film. On 11 February 2015, Eric Bana was added to the cast to play Uther, the father of King Arthur. Mikael Persbrandt joined the film on 6 March 2015, to play a villainous role. Although there were reports Idris Elba had been cast, he would confirm, in a Reddit AMA, this was a rumour.

=== Filming ===
Filming in Windsor Great Park was underway in February 2015, then later in North Wales from 2 March 2015. In April 2015, filming took place in Snowdonia, where locations used were Tryfan, Nant Gwynant near Beddgelert and Capel Curig. Early in July filming continued in the Shieldaig, Loch Torridon and Applecross areas of Wester Ross in the Scottish Highlands. One day of filming also took place at The Quiraing on the Isle of Skye. Filming also took place at Warner Bros. Studios, Leavesden.

== Marketing ==
The teaser trailer for the film was released on 23 July 2016, during the 2016 San Diego Comic-Con.

It was originally planned for an IMAX release on 22 July 2016, as evident in the Comic-Con trailer, but was cancelled due to it being postponed and only received non-IMAX presentations.

An extended TV spot was released on 22 January 2017, and was shown on the 2017 NFC Championship Game on Fox Broadcasting Company between the Atlanta Falcons and the Green Bay Packers and the 2017 AFC Championship Game on CBS between the Pittsburgh Steelers and the New England Patriots.

The first trailer was released on 20 February 2017. The second trailer was released on 1 April 2017. All in all, Warner Bros. spent $135 million on marketing the film.

The film was shown at select AMC Theatres in a special preview on 27 April 2017, in a promotional event titled "King for a Day". Demand for tickets led AMC to expand the event to 200 theatres.

== Release ==
=== Theatrical ===
In April 2014, Warner Bros. set the film for a 22 July 2016 release, alongside Lights Out, but it was then moved by Warner Bros. to 17 February 2017, alongside Maze Runner: The Death Cure. Warner Bros. moved the release date to 24 March 2017. The title was changed to King Arthur: Legend of the Sword in July 2016. In December 2016 the release date was again moved, this time to 12 May 2017, possibly so as not to compete with CHiPs.

=== Home media ===
King Arthur: Legend of the Sword was released on DVD, Blu-ray, 3D Blu-ray and Ultra HD on 8 August 2017.

== Reception ==
=== Box office ===
King Arthur: Legend of the Sword grossed $39.2 million in the United States and Canada and $107 million in other territories for a worldwide total of $146.2 million, against a production budget of $175 million. Deadline Hollywood calculated the film lost Warner Bros. $153.2 million, when factoring together all expenses and revenues.

In North America, the film was released alongside Snatched and Lowriders and was initially projected to gross around $25 million from 3,702 theatres during its opening weekend. It made $1.15 million from Thursday night previews at about 3,200 theatres, but after making just $5.3 million on Friday, weekend projections were lowered to $15 million. It ended up debuting to $15.4 million, finishing third at the box office. Deadline Hollywood noted that due to the film's $175 million production budget, as well as at least an additional $100 million spent on marketing, the film was destined to be a box office bomb. Regarding the cost of the film, the site quoted one finance expert as saying: "Make original IP [intellectual property] for a cost effective price. If it works then spend more if necessary on the sequel. King Arthur should have been done for $60–80 [million]. Warner Bros. had no reason to spend $175M-plus on this picture." Comparing its opening to cost, IndieWire called the film's failings "historic". The Hollywood Reporter noted that the film would likely lose about $150 million. In its second weekend the film grossed $7.2 million (a drop of 53.5%), finishing 5th at the box office.

The film debuted at No. 1 in an estimated 29 countries, including Russia, with openings to follow in the United Kingdom, France, South Korea and Australia. Over its opening weekend, it made $29.1 million worldwide.

=== Critical response ===
On review aggregator website Rotten Tomatoes, the film has an approval rating of 31% based on 279 reviews and an average rating of 4.7/10. The site's critical consensus reads, "King Arthur: Legend of the Sword piles mounds of modern action flash on an age-old tale – and wipes out much of what made it a classic story in the first place." On Metacritic, the film has a score 41 out of 100 based on 45 critics, indicating "mixed or average" reviews. Audiences polled by CinemaScore gave the film an average grade of "B+" on an A+ to F scale, while PostTrak reporter filmgoers gave it an overall positive score of 78%; 56% of the opening weekend filmgoers were under the age of 35, and 59% were men.

Writing for The Guardian, Peter Bradshaw gave the film a generally positive review: "Guy Ritchie's cheerfully ridiculous Arthur is a gonzo monarch, a death-metal warrior-king. Ritchie's film is at all times over the top, crashing around its digital landscapes in all manner of berserkness, sometimes whooshing along, sometimes stuck in the odd narrative doldrum. But it is often surprisingly entertaining, and whatever clunkers he has delivered in the past, Ritchie again shows that a film-maker of his craft and energy commands attention, and part of his confidence in reviving King Arthur resides here in being so unselfconscious and unconcerned about the student canon that has gone before." Matt Zoller Seitz of RogerEbert.com gave the film one-and-a-half out of four stars, stating that despite the potential for a revisionist King Arthur story with "[t]he Ritchie sense of style", the overall problem is the film's lack of modulation: "Ritchie keeps rushing us along for two hours, as if to make absolutely certain that we never have time to absorb any character or moment, much less revel in the glorious, cheeky ridiculousness of the whole thing."

In a criticism of the film for the Chicago Tribune, Michael Phillips questioned the long-term longevity of the projected series of six Arthur films from Ritchie: "I'm no businessman, but plans for a six-film franchise may be optimistic. Optimism is nowhere to be found in Ritchie's movie itself. It is a grim and stupid thing, from one of the world's most successful mediocre filmmakers, and if Shakespeare's King Lear were blogging today, he'd supply the blurb quote: 'Nothing will come of nothing.'." Chris Hartwell of The Hollywood Reporter expressed disappointment in the film's lackluster box office performance denying a sequel for the introduction of Merlin, stating it would have been more successful as a solo film instead of setting up a franchise.

Alissa Wilkinson of Vox writes that the film is "surprisingly good, and surprisingly political" in relation to the British withdrawal from the European Union, and "occasionally, it's even pretty great".

=== Accolades ===
King Arthur: Legend of the Sword was nominated in four categories at the 2017 Golden Trailer Awards: "Throne" (Open Road Entertainment) for Best Action, "Story" (Wild Card) for both Best Original Score and Best Sound Editing, and "Rules 60" (Wild Card) for Best Fantasy Adventure TV Spot (for a Feature Film). At the Golden Reel Awards 2017, the film received a nomination for Outstanding Achievement in Sound Editing – Music Score.
