= Company Man (film) =

- Theatrical release poster
- Directed by: Peter Askin; Douglas McGrath
- Written by: Peter Askin; Douglas McGrath
- Produced by: John Penotti; Rick Leed; James W. Skotchdopole
- Starring: Alan Cumming; Anthony LaPaglia; Denis Leary; Douglas McGrath; John Turturro; Sigourney Weaver
- Cinematography: Russell Boyd
- Edited by: Camilla Toniolo
- Music by: David Lawrence
- Production company: Intermedia Films
- Distributed by: UGC Fox Distribution (France); Pathé Distribution (United Kingdom and France); Paramount Classics (United States)
- Release dates: 3 May 2000 (France); 9 March 2001 (United States)
- Running time: 82 minutes
- Countries: France; United Kingdom; United States
- Language: English
- Budget: $16 million
- Box office: $146,193 (US)

Company Man is a 2000 comedy film written and directed by Peter Askin and Douglas McGrath. The film stars McGrath, Sigourney Weaver, John Turturro, Ryan Phillippe, Alan Cumming, Anthony LaPaglia, Woody Allen, and Denis Leary as "Officer Fry". Bill Murray had a cameo appearance in the film that was cut before the film's release.

== Plot ==
In the 1960s, Alan Quimp is a schoolteacher of English grammar and married to the very demanding Daisy Quimp. In order to avoid the constant mockery in Daisy's family, Alan says that he is a secret CIA agent. Daisy tells everybody, the CIA acknowledges the lie, but due to a coincidence, Alan has just helped and hidden the professional Russian dancer Petrov who wanted to leave Russia. The CIA decides to hire Alan as an agent, to get the credit for bringing Petrov to the US, and immediately decides to send him to a very calm place, Cuba.

== Cast ==
- Alan Cumming as General Batista
- Anthony LaPaglia as Fidel Castro
- Denis Leary as Officer Fry
- Douglas McGrath as Alan Quimp
- John Turturro as Crocker Johnson
- Sigourney Weaver as Daisy Quimp
- Ryan Phillippe as Rudolph Petrov
- Jeffrey Jones as Senator Biggs
- Paul Guilfoyle as Officer Hickle
- Heather Matarazzo as Nora
- Meredith Patterson as Marilyn Monroe
- Tuck Milligan as President Kennedy
- Woody Allen (uncredited) as Lowther
- Jason Antoon (uncredited) as Croupier
- Bill Murray (cameo, deleted scene)
- Edward Priest as Company Man

== Release ==
=== Box office ===
The film grossed $146,193 on a $16 million budget.

=== Critical reception ===
Rotten Tomatoes reports that 14% of 63 surveyed critics gave the film a positive review; the average rating was 3.4/10. The consensus states: "A flat and misconceived movie with big stars." Metacritic, which uses a weighted average, assigned the film a score of 18 out of 100, based on 21 critics, indicating "overwhelming dislike".

Lisa Nesselson of Variety called it "consistently silly, occasionally funny but mostly forced".
