= Tory Tunnell =

American film producer

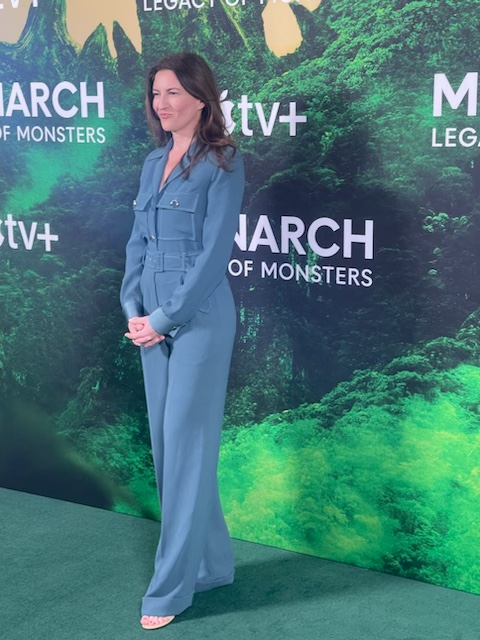
Tory Tunnell

Tory Tunnell is an American producer who runs Safehouse Pictures with her producing partner, Joby Harold. The company was co-founded in 2005. The duo currently have an overhead TV deal with Legendary TV and Amazon Prime for features.

== Career ==
Tunnell's latest projects include Paramount's Novocaine (2025 film) starring Jack Quaid, Amber Midthunder, Ray Nicholson, and directed by Dan Berk and Robert Olsen. Tunnell recently produced the A24 documentary Andre is an Idiot, which received a standing ovation at its premiere at the Sundance film festival where it was in dramatic competition. She recently produced Atlas starring Jennifer Lopez, Simu Liu, and Sterling K. Brown which she produced alongside Harold. She is also working on the new show Monarch: Legacy of Monsters with Legendary starring Kurt Russell, Wyatt Russell, Ren Watabe, Anna Sawai, and Kiersey Clemons.

Tunnell and Harold have made films in a variety of genres. From Guy Ritchie’s King Arthur: Legend of the Sword starring Charlie Hunnam and Jude Law, to the breakout comedy of SXSW My Blind Brother starring Adam Scott, Nick Kroll, and Jenny Slate, to the critical hit TV show Underground about slaves escaping the south, to the ice skating drama Spinning Out on Netflix starring Kaya Scodelario and January Jones and Johnny Weir, the company has produced a wide range of content. Harold and Tunnell have a number of films in development including Liberators with Michael B. Jordan attached to star at Warner Bros, Battle of Britain that Ridley Scott is attached to direct for Fox, Wink that is loosely based on Tunnell’s own experiences of online dating as her mother, Patricia Arquette’s directorial debut and true story drama Love Canal, and the limited series Mary’s Mosaic to be written by Oscar winning writer David Seidler for Warner Bros.

Originally based in New York, Tunnell began her career producing independent features including; Holy Rollers starring Jesse Eisenberg and Justin Bartha which premiered at Sundance 2009; Trumbo starring Liam Neeson, Michael Douglas, Joan Allen, Nathan Lane, and Donald Sutherland, which premiered at the Toronto Film Festival 2007; and Awake written and directed by Joby Harold starring Jessica Alba, Hayden Christensen, and Terrence Howard.

== Personal life ==
Tunnell graduated Phi Beta Kappa from Johns Hopkins University and now resides with Harold and their 3 children.

== Filmography ==
Associate producer

- The Best Thief in the World (2004)
- The War Within (2005)

Producer

- Trumbo (2007)
- Awake (2007) (Co-producer)
- Holy Rollers (2010)
- The Bleeding House (2011)
- My Blind Brother (2016)
- King Arthur: Legend of the Sword (2017)
- Atlas (2024)
- André Is an Idiot (2025)
- Novocaine (2025)

Executive producer

- Underground (2016-2017)
- Robin Hood (2018)
- Spinning Out (2020)
- Monarch: Legacy of Monsters (2023-present)
