= Night of the Aurochs =

1979 posthumous novel by Dalton Trumbo

- First edition cover
- Author: Dalton Trumbo
- Language: English
- Genre: War novel
- Publisher: Viking Press
- Publication date: 1979
- Publication place: United States
- Media type: Print (hardback & paperback)
- Pages: 218 pp (hardback edition)
- ISBN: 0-670-51412-8 (hardback edition)
- OCLC: 4932945
- Dewey Decimal: 813/.5/2
- LC Class: PZ3.T7714 Ni PS3539.R928

Night of the Aurochs is an unfinished novel by Dalton Trumbo, published posthumously in 1979, three years after his death, edited by Robert Kirsch. It follows a Nazi commander named Ludwig Grieben, from childhood until his death. One of his few novels, it received generally negative reviews, in large part due to its nature as an unfinished work published posthumously.

== Synopsis ==
Aurochs is an attempt by Trumbo to tell the tale of World War II through the eyes of a Nazi by the name of Grieban, commandant of the concentration camp at Auschwitz. The story starts out narrated in the first person through a series of letters written by Grieban, but later is written in the third person.

In his narration, Grieban tries to link the ethical nature of the Nazi movement to the American Civil War by saying the comparisons are undeniable: Fighting to keep the races pure and separated. Grieban may be looked at as the epitome of one fighting for the cause, but he himself fails to live up to his own high ideals of racial purity when he falls in 'love' with a Jewish woman during his years as a Nazi concentration camp commandant.

== Background ==
Trumbo started working on Night of the Aurochs as in 1960, and it was still unfinished as of his death in September 1976. It was only one of his side projects, as his main writing focus for that period was his screenplays. It was compiled and edited for posthumous publication by Robert Kirsch, a critic for the Los Angeles Times. Ten chapters were completed at the time of Trumbo's death, and those chapters, along with his notes and outlines for plot and character development, were edited into the completed novel by Kirsch. Aurochs ended up being published on November 1, 1979 by Viking Press, three years after Trumbo's death.

== Reception ==
Night of the Aurochs released to generally negative reviews. Even the most positive critics acknowledged the fact that the novel was simply not finished, though they appreciated what Kirsch was able to salvage of the outlines and Trumbo's finished chapters. Other critics acknowledged the potential of the novel, if Trumbo had been given the opportunity to finish it, but did not consider it to be worth releasing in its current state. The most negative felt that the novel was simply a bad concept at its core, telling the story of a stereotypical and inhumanly violent Nazi commander as the protagonist; Kirkus Reviews wrote that it likely "would have been a dreadful book", made worse by its posthumous release.

Trumbo's similarities to his protagonist, being an old man who suffered from chronic heart disease and cancer, were noted by critics - The Baltimore Sun's Michael West wrote that Trumbo had become deeply involved with Grieben, who had become at the very least an interesting character to readers, if not a sympathetic one. Clarence Olson of the St. Louis Post-Dispatch considered Trumbo's similarities to have inadvertently made him identify with the character too well.
