= Alan Klingenstein =

American film producer

- Born: 1954 (age 71–72); Scarsdale, New York, U.S.
- Education: Taft School; Princeton University; Cornell University (MBA)
- Occupations: Film producer, attorney, investment banker

Alan Klingenstein (born 1954) is an American corporate and securities attorney, investment banker, film producer and content distributor. His feature film Two Family House won the Audience Award at the 2000 Sundance Film Festival. Another feature film, Runaway, premiered at the Tribeca Film Festival in 2005 and won the Best Screenplay award at the Austin Film Festival. His documentary Trumbo premiered at the Toronto International Film Festival in 2007 and was awarded the National Board of Review's Freedom of Expression Award. Alan Klingenstein currently serves as the Vice Chairman of Radial Entertainment, a global film and television distribution studio. Prior to Radial Entertainment, Klingenstein served as the Board Chairman at FilmRise, a film and television studio he co-founded in 2010.

== Early life ==
Klingenstein was born and raised in Scarsdale, New York. He is Jewish. His father was Lee P. Klingenstein, a partner in the New York investment management firm of Neuberger Berman. Klingenstein graduated from the Taft School. He then earned a bachelor's degree at Princeton, and a J.D. and M.B.A. from Cornell University.

He was a corporate and securities attorney with the firm of McCutcheon, Doyle, Brown & Enerson. He travelled through Asia as general counsel and VP for Shakey's International. Later he worked as a VP of Bankers Trust Securities in New York and London.

== Film production and distribution ==
In 1996, after twelve years in the corporate world, Klingenstein produced his first film: the documentary The Church of Saint Coltrane with Jeff Swimmer. Shortly after, Klingenstein formed Filbert Steps Productions, together with media investor and production partner Jim Kohlberg. Klingenstein produced Filberts Steps' films for very low budgets: Forever Fabulous (1999),Two Family House (2000), Runaway (2005), and Trumbo (2008) Two Family House premiered, and won the Audience Award, at the 2000 Sundance Film Festival.

Klingenstein developed Filmcatcher.com, containing editorial coverage of art house films, on-camera interviews with filmmakers and actors, film festival coverage, critical reviews, celebrity picks, and profiles of the independent film community.

In 2010, Klingenstein joined with brothers Danny and Jack Fisher to create FilmRise, a film and television content acquisition fund and distribution company, established to acquire and distribute a slate of both mainstream and specialized films, documentaries, and television series.

Klingenstein and the Fisher brothers sold Filmrise in 2025 to Radial Entertainment, a production and distribution conpany backed by funds managed by Oaktree Capital Management. Radial's catalog of over 70,000 films and TV episodes is one of the largest in the industry. Alan Klingenstein currently helps to manage that catalog, as the Vice Chairman of Radial Entertainment.

== See Also ==
- Cornell Law School (Notable Alumni)
- Cornell University (Notable Alumni)
- Princeton University (Notable Alumni)
- The Taft School (Notable Alumni)
