= FilmRise =

American film and television studio and streaming network

FilmRise Acquisitions LLC
- Formerly: Fisher Klingenstein Films
- Type: Subsidiary
- Industry: Film and television distribution
- Founded: 2012; 14 years ago
- Founders: Danny Fisher; Jack Fisher; Alan Klingenstein
- Headquarters: New York City, New York, United States
- Area served: Worldwide
- Key people: Alan Klingenstein (chairman); Danny Fisher (CEO); Jack Fisher (president); Johnny Holden (CFO & CSO)
- Products: Motion pictures Film distribution FAST channels Home video
- Parent: Radial Entertainment (2025–present)
- Website: filmrise.com

FilmRise Acquisitions LLC is an American media company, headquartered in New York City, that operates a film and television studio and a free ad-supported streaming television (FAST) network. FilmRise also syndicates its own digital linear channels to platforms including The Roku Channel, Samsung TV Plus, Amazon Freevee and Vizio.

FilmRise focuses on acquiring content that is either under the radar or considered undervalued by the industry.

== History ==
In 2012, Danny and Jack Fisher began studying the current state of television and film and developed a new concept for the emerging digital industry. Their vision took shape as a connection between data, content, audiences, and the internet. Data signals were used to measure demand for content and they envisioned digital channels where viewers would get their content for free. This became the foundation of FilmRise's business model for streaming including SVOD/AVOD. Alan Klingenstein joined onto the project as a partner, and the three became the founders of FilmRise.

They began to use their approach to acquire dormant and/or under-recognized film and television content and distribute the titles on DVD and digital platforms, such as Amazon's Disc on Demand and YouTube. This proved successful and the company became profitable.

In 2013, Medstar Productions put the digital rights of the long-running, syndicated hit and a staple of the HLN network, Forensic Files, up for license. FilmRise licensed the exclusive American digital distribution rights and has released the property successfully on numerous platforms, including Netflix, Disney's Hulu and Amazon Prime, making the show one of the most popular library shows in the streaming space.

In 2017, FilmRise became one of the first content providers on The Roku Channel and has since become a content provider on other ad-supported streaming services including Peacock (NBCUniversal), Amazon Freevee, Samsung TV Plus, Vizio, Sling (Dish), Pluto TV (Paramount Skydance), and Tubi (Fox Corp).

By the end of 2017, the company raised over $100 million or content acquisitions. These funds were used to pay license fees for film and television libraries. FilmRise continued to work with emerging digital platforms, as well as growing relationships with major Hollywood studios and television networks that were eager for new licensing opportunities. FilmRise's ability to optimize monetization from TV and film content enabled it to work with many streaming platforms on its programming.

In 2020, the company introduced its first original co-production, Bloodline Detectives with Nancy Grace, which completed its fifth season in 2025. The series airs on broadcast television via syndication, and is streamed on digital platforms.

Johnny Holden joined FilmRise in August 2020 as Chief Financial Officer (CFO). In May 2024, he was elevated to Chief Strategy Officer while retaining his role as CFO.

In January 2021, FilmRise acquired the streaming rights to content from several YouTubers. In the same year, it entered in an exclusive deal with Fuji TV's distribution arm, Fuji Creative Corporation to acquire streaming and digital distribution rights to the Japanese cooking show Iron Chef.

In Spring 2021, FilmRise acquired the streaming rights to Canada-based Corus' kids and family content along animation and live-action programming.

In August 2022, it acquired streaming rights to the syndicated reality TV show Cheaters from Goldstein Pictures Corporation.

In April 2023, it acquired the streaming and digital distribution rights to the reality television series World's Wildest Police Videos and its specials, including the World's Scariest Police Chases series from Pursuit Productions. In October, FilmRise acquired the worldwide digital distribution rights to the BuzzFeed Studios and Complex Networks television libraries, which includes their YouTube shows Hot Ones and BuzzFeed Unsolved and also TV shows and specials that feature the Australian children's music group The Wiggles.

In July 2025, FilmRise was purchased by Oaktree Capital Management, which merged the company with Shout! Studios as a single holding company named Radial Entertainment. CEO Danny Fisher will serve as Executive Chairman of Radial.

== Film (animation and live-action) ==
- A Guide to Recognizing Your Saints
- A Little Bit of Heaven
- Abner, The Invisible Dog
- Babar: King of the Elephants
- Babar: The Movie
- Bad Lieutenant: Port of Call New Orleans
- Bernie
- Can't Be Heaven
- Dog Gone
- Donnie Darko
- Doom Runners
- Driveways
- Going Clear: Scientology and the Prison of Belief
- Jack and the Beanstalk
- Khumba
- Little Nemo: Adventures in Slumberland
- Manifesto
- Marjorie Prime
- Memento
- Mickey Matson and the Copperhead Conspiracy
- Miracle Dogs
- Miracle Dogs Too
- Monster
- My Brother the Pig
- My Friend Dahmer
- Pirates of the Plain
- Resurrecting the Champ
- Rob the Mob
- Sabrina the Teenage Witch
- Scorched
- Seventeen Again
- Sign o' the Times
- Silicon Cowboys
- Sprinter
- Stellaluna
- The Adventure Club
- The Ghost Club
- The Illusionist
- The Miseducation of Cameron Post
- The Ponysitters Club: Fun At The Fair
- The Ponysitters Club: The Big Sleepover
- The Time Capsule
- The Vault
- Welcome to Me
- White Girl

== Television (animation and live-action) ==
=== Original programming ===
- Bloodline Detectives (2020–2024)
- Music: Through the Lens (2020–2021)
- Meet, Marry, Murder (2021)
- Making a Serial Killer (2021–2024)
- Follow Me (2023)
- The Interrogation Room (2023)
- Not Like Mama (2023–present)

=== Acquired programming ===
- Forensic Files
- Hell's Kitchen
- 3rd Rock from the Sun
- Unsolved Mysteries – the original Robert Stack episodes
- 21 Jump Street
- Midsomer Murders
- The Rifleman
- The Greatest American Hero
- Roseanne
- Kitchen Nightmares
- Shameless
- The Commish
- Highway to Heaven
- Grounded for Life
- Father Ted
- Grace Under Fire
- Cybill
- Case Histories
- Neverland
- Dinotopia
- Wycliffe
- Iron Chef
- Hunter
- Heartland
- The Kids in the Hall
- Hemlock Grove
- Hannibal
- Cheaters
- It's a Living
- World's Wildest Police Videos
- Dr. G: Medical Examiner
- America's Dumbest Criminals
- Full Force Nature
- To Serve and Protect
- Beyond Belief: Fact or Fiction
- Red vs. Blue
- Now See This
- Storm Warning!
- Mostly True Stories: Urban Legends Revealed
- The Secret Life of a Soccer Mom
- Next Action Star
- UFO
- Nomad of Nowhere
- Copper
- Hindenburg: The Last Flight
- Welcome to Paradox
- Camp Camp
- Psi Factor
- The FBI Files
- Mom P.I.
- The Dick Van Dyke Show
- That Girl
- L.A. Heat
- Skeleton Stories
- Coronation Street
- Anatomy of Disaster
- What Went Wrong?
- Billy Goes North
- Truthseekers
- Mysterious Worlds
- Sea Patrol
- Peep Show
- The Life and Legend of Wyatt Earp
- The Joey Bishop Show
- The Cisco Kid
- Hot Ones
- Captain Simian and the Space Monkeys
- Celebrity Bowling
- World's Most Evil Killers
- Killers: Caught on Camera
- Murdered at First Sight
- Outdoor Outtakes
- Expeditions to the Edge
- Booker
- Stingray
- Cannonball Run 2001
- The Real McCoys
- Providence

== Children's programming (animation and live-action) ==
- Inspector Gadget
- My Pet Monster
- COPS
- Babar
- The Super Mario Bros. Super Show!
- The Baby-Sitters Club
- Rupert
- The Big Comfy Couch
- Barney & Friends
- Cadillacs and Dinosaurs
- Adventures of Sonic the Hedgehog
- Madeline
- Tales from the Cryptkeeper
- Where on Earth Is Carmen Sandiego?
- Wild C.A.T.s
- Gadget Boy & Heather
- Nancy Drew
- The Hardy Boys
- Stickin' Around
- Donkey Kong Country
- Mummies Alive!
- Ned's Newt
- Pippi Longstocking
- Franklin
- The Wiggles
  - Dorothy the Dinosaur
- Animorphs
- Rescue Heroes
- Sabrina: The Animated Series
- Journey to the West – Legends of the Monkey King
- Maggie and the Ferocious Beast
- Marvin the Tap-Dancing Horse
- Timothy Goes to School
- Totally Spies!
- Yu-Gi-Oh!
  - Yu-Gi-Oh! Duel Monsters
  - Yu-Gi-Oh! GX
  - Yu-Gi-Oh! 5D's
  - Yu-Gi-Oh! Zexal
  - Yu-Gi-Oh! Arc-V
  - Yu-Gi-Oh! VRAINS
- Sonic X
- Braceface
- Degrassi: The Next Generation
- Horrible Histories
- Liberty's Kids
- Beyblade: Metal Fusion
  - Beyblade: Metal Fusion
  - Beyblade: Metal Masters
  - Beyblade: Metal Fury
  - Beyblade: Shogun Steel
- Angelina Ballerina
- I Spy
- My Dad the Rock Star
- Jacob Two-Two
- Strawberry Shortcake
- Maya & Miguel
- 6teen
- Being Ian
- Horseland
- Grossology
- Jane and the Dragon
- Ruby Gloom
- DinoSquad
- Bakugan Battle Brawlers
  - Bakugan Battle Brawlers
  - Bakugan: New Vestoria
  - Bakugan: Gundalian Invaders
  - Bakugan: Mechtanium Surge
- My Friend Rabbit
- Kid vs. Kat
- Pearlie
- Baby Antonio's Circus
- Sidekick
- Scaredy Squirrel
- Mike the Knight
- Slugterra
- Camp Lakebottom
- Oh No! It's an Alien Invasion
- Astroblast!
- Little Charmers
