= Novocaine (2025 film) =

2025 film by Dan Berk and Robert Olsen

- Theatrical release poster
- Directed by: Dan Berk; Robert Olsen
- Written by: Lars Jacobson
- Produced by: Drew Simon; Tory Tunnell; Joby Harold; Sam Speiser; Matt Schwartz; Julian Rosenberg
- Starring: Jack Quaid; Amber Midthunder; Ray Nicholson; Betty Gabriel; Matt Walsh; Jacob Batalon
- Cinematography: Jacques Jouffret
- Edited by: Christian Wagner
- Music by: Lorne Balfe; Andrew Kawczynski
- Production companies: Infrared Pictures; Safehouse Pictures; Circle of Confusion
- Distributed by: Paramount Pictures
- Release date: March 14, 2025
- Running time: 110 minutes
- Countries: United States; South Africa; Canada
- Language: English
- Budget: $18 million
- Box office: $34.5 million

Novocaine (known as Mr. No Pain in some regions and Novocaine No Pain in Australia) is a 2025 action comedy film directed by Dan Berk and Robert Olsen and written by Lars Jacobson. It was a co-production of the United States, Canada, and South Africa. The film stars Jack Quaid, Amber Midthunder, Ray Nicholson, Betty Gabriel, Matt Walsh, and Jacob Batalon.

The plot follows Nathan Caine, a bank employee with the inability to feel pain who goes out to rescue his co-worker after she is taken hostage by a group of bank robbers.

Novocaine was released in the United States by Paramount Pictures on March 14, 2025. The film grossed $34.5 million worldwide and received positive reviews from critics.

== Plot ==
Nathan Caine is an introvert with congenital insensitivity to pain with anhidrosis (CIPA) working as an assistant manager at a trust credit union in San Diego. His co-worker Sherry Margrave is interested in him, but Nathan is hesitant due to his condition and inexperience with women. At a bar with Sherry, Nathan encounters a middle-school bully who calls him "Novocaine". In retaliation, Sherry tricks the bully into drinking a shot of hot sauce; the two then spend the night together at Nathan's home.

The next morning, a gang of three men led by Simon Greenly rob the credit union. Simon murders Nathan's boss Nigel after he refuses to surrender the vault code. When Simon threatens Sherry, Nathan gives him the code. Police arrive and a shootout ensues in which the robbers escape with Sherry as a hostage. After placing a tourniquet on a wounded policeman, Nathan steals a police car and pursues the robbers' cars. When they split up, Nathan follows the car with only one robber, Ben. Nathan fights Ben in a restaurant kitchen and shoots him dead with the wounded policeman's gun, which he retrieves from a deep fryer, burning his hand.

With help from his friend Roscoe, Nathan tracks down Zeno, a tattoo artist who worked on Ben's arm. Interrogating Zeno, he learns Ben's last name. Nathan runs a credit check on Ben and acquires his home address. Ben had booby-trapped his house and Nathan ends up stuck in a snare trap. In desperation, he calls Roscoe. Another robber, Ben's brother Andre, discovers Nathan while searching for Ben and shortly after is informed by Simon that Ben is dead. Andre begins to torture Nathan, who feigns feeling pain. Roscoe arrives and together they overpower and kill Andre. Police officers Mincy Langston and Coltraine Duffy arrive at the house and arrest Roscoe, whose distraction allows Nathan to escape.

Nathan locates Sherry and Simon at an auto shop, where Simon reveals that Sherry is his sister and accomplice. She originally intended to seduce Nathan to learn the bank vault code but developed real feelings for him and was horrified that Simon needlessly murdered her boss, Nigel. As Nathan is heartbroken upon learning the truth about Sherry, Simon tries to kill him against Sherry's protests, before Simon is soon shot by an arriving Coltraine before he could kill Sherry, while Nathan is arrested. Simon in turn shoots Coltraine dead and wounds Mincy, escaping in the ambulance holding Nathan. Sherry pursues the ambulance with Mincy and Roscoe.

Nathan is able to slip out of the handcuff by dislocating his thumb and uses a defibrillator on Simon, causing him to crash. The two continue to fight, with Simon ending up breaking Nathan's arm in the process. Sherry arrives and attacks Simon while Roscoe drives Mincy to the hospital. As Simon is about to kill Sherry, Nathan injects himself with adrenaline and brutally finishes Simon by impaling his exposed fractured arm bone up through Simon's jaw and brain, killing him. As an exhausted Nathan is tended by a tearful Sherry, he falls unconscious from his injuries.

Nathan awakes in a hospital two weeks later, having been put in a medically-induced coma and a full body cast to recover from his injuries. He learns from Mincy that he has been given a deal of six months of house arrest and five years of probation for his actions due to saving the life of the police officer after the shootout.

One year later, Nathan visits Sherry in prison, who has eight months left on her sentence. They share a slice of cherry pie, which Sherry had introduced him to on their first date. As the prison guards lead Sherry back to her cell, Nathan chews a piece of pie and smiles.

== Cast ==
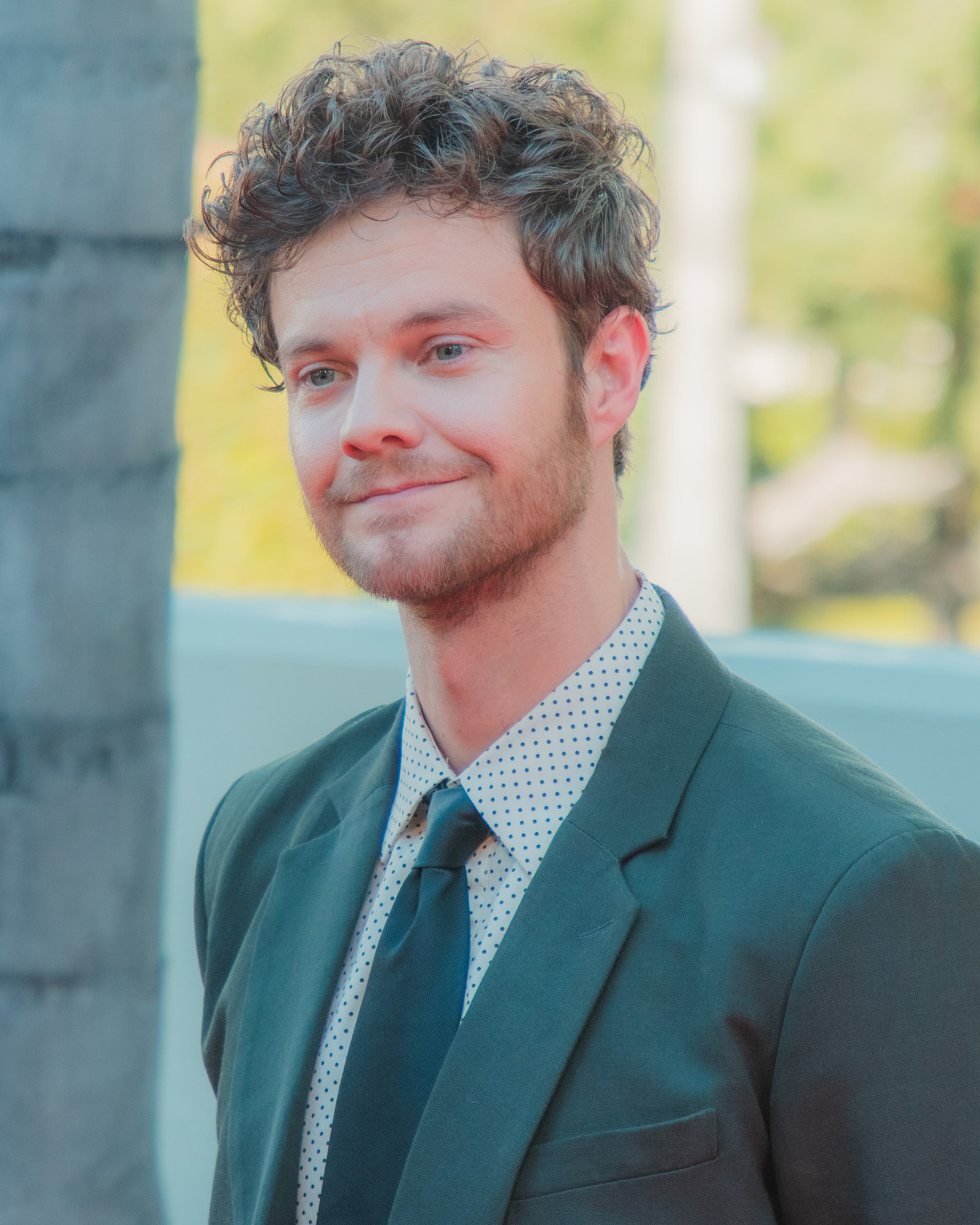
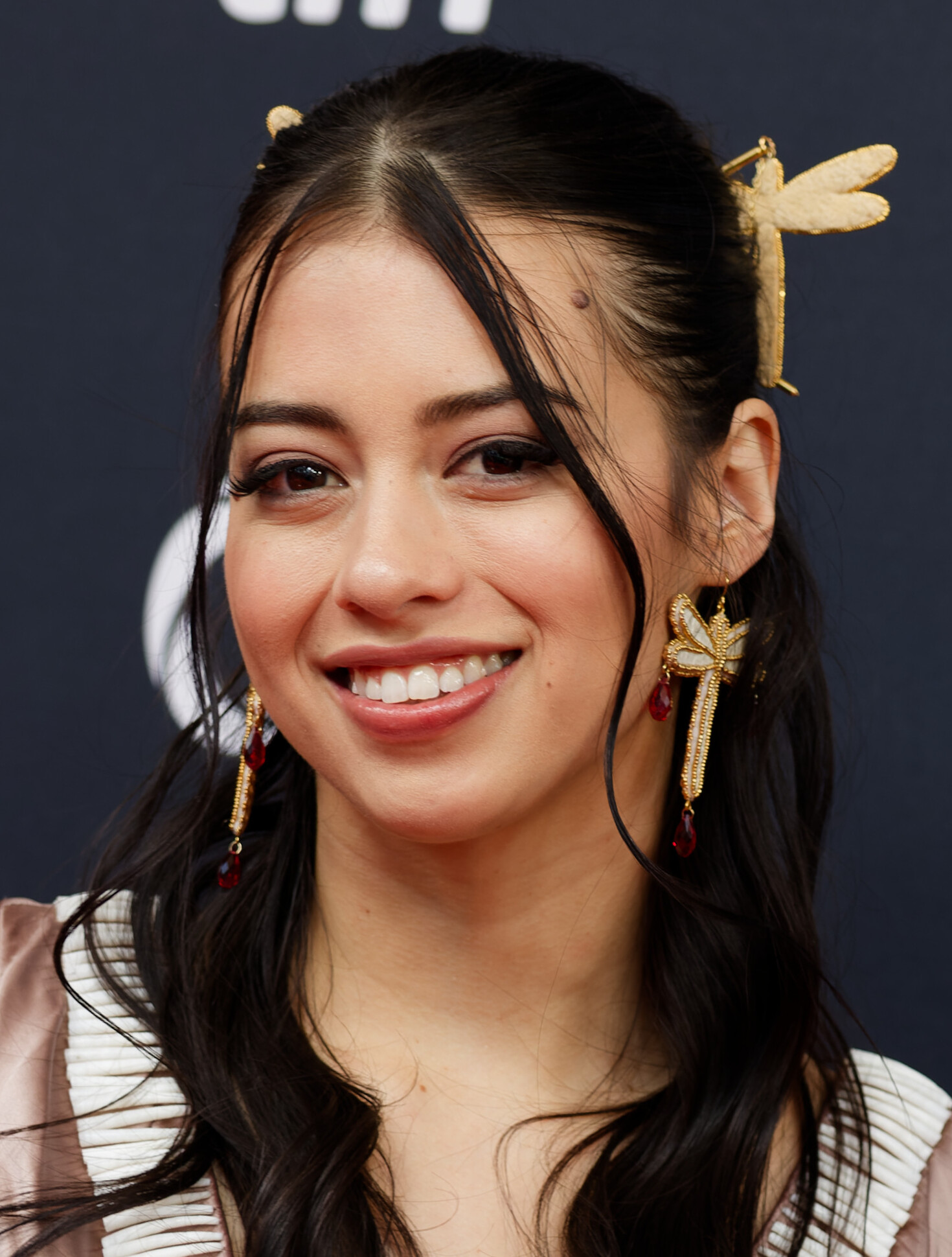
Jack Quaid plays Nathan "Novocaine" Caine while Amber Midthunder plays Sherry Margrave.
- Jack Quaid as Nathan "Novocaine" Caine, a sheltered bank executive who cannot feel pain
- Amber Midthunder as Sherry Margrave, Nathan's love interest who is kidnapped by bank robbers
- Ray Nicholson as Simon Greenly, a bank robber
- Jacob Batalon as Roscoe Dixon, Nathan's online gaming friend
- Betty Gabriel as Mincy Langston, a detective with the SDPD
- Matt Walsh as Coltraine Duffy, a detective with the SDPD
- Conrad Kemp as Andre Clark, a bank robber
- Evan Hengst as Ben Clark, a bank robber and Andre's brother
- Craig Jackson as Nigel, Nathan's manager
- Lou Beatty Jr. as Earl, one of Nate's bank clients
- Garth Collins as Zeno, a tattoo artist and an acquaintance of Ben's

== Production ==
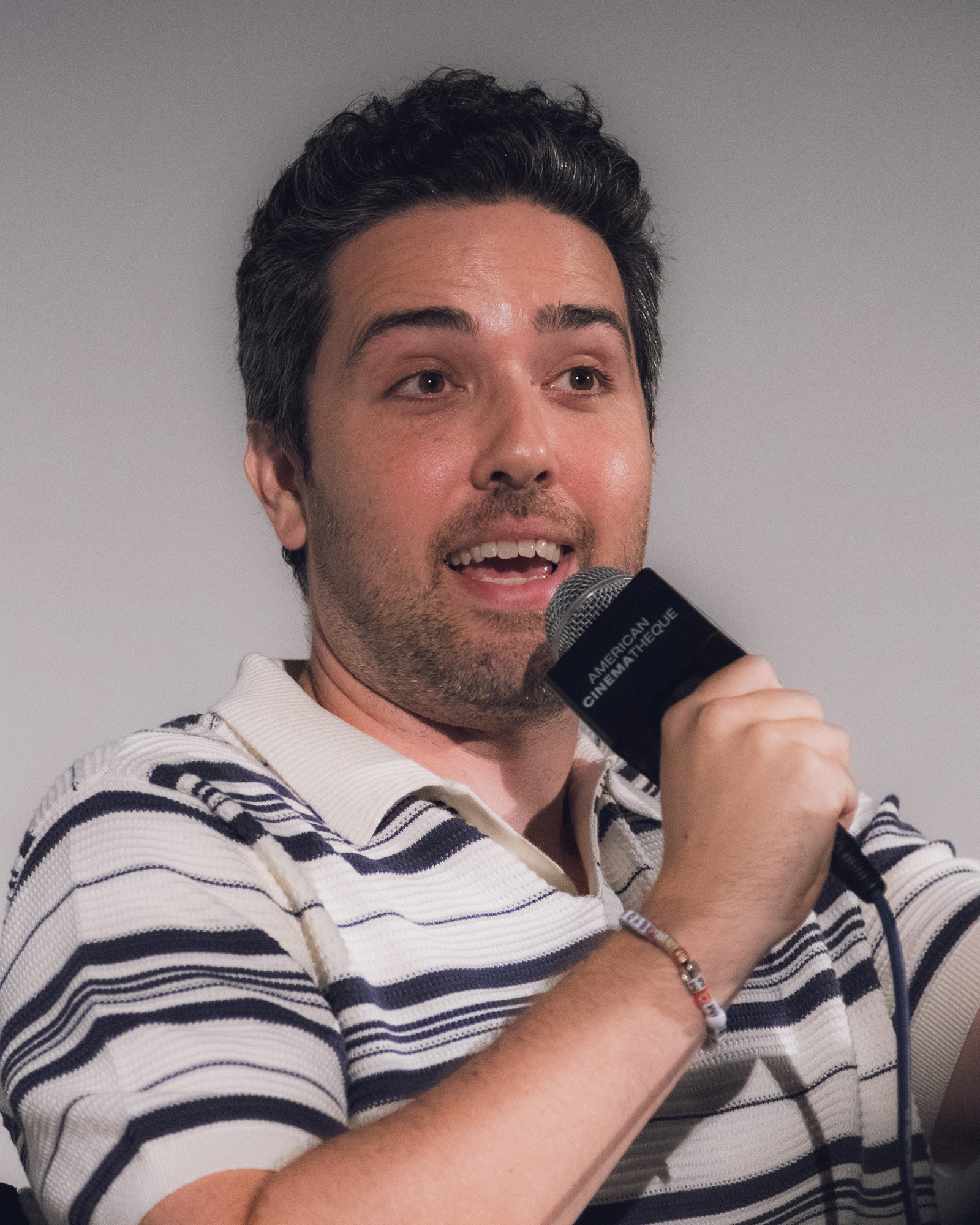
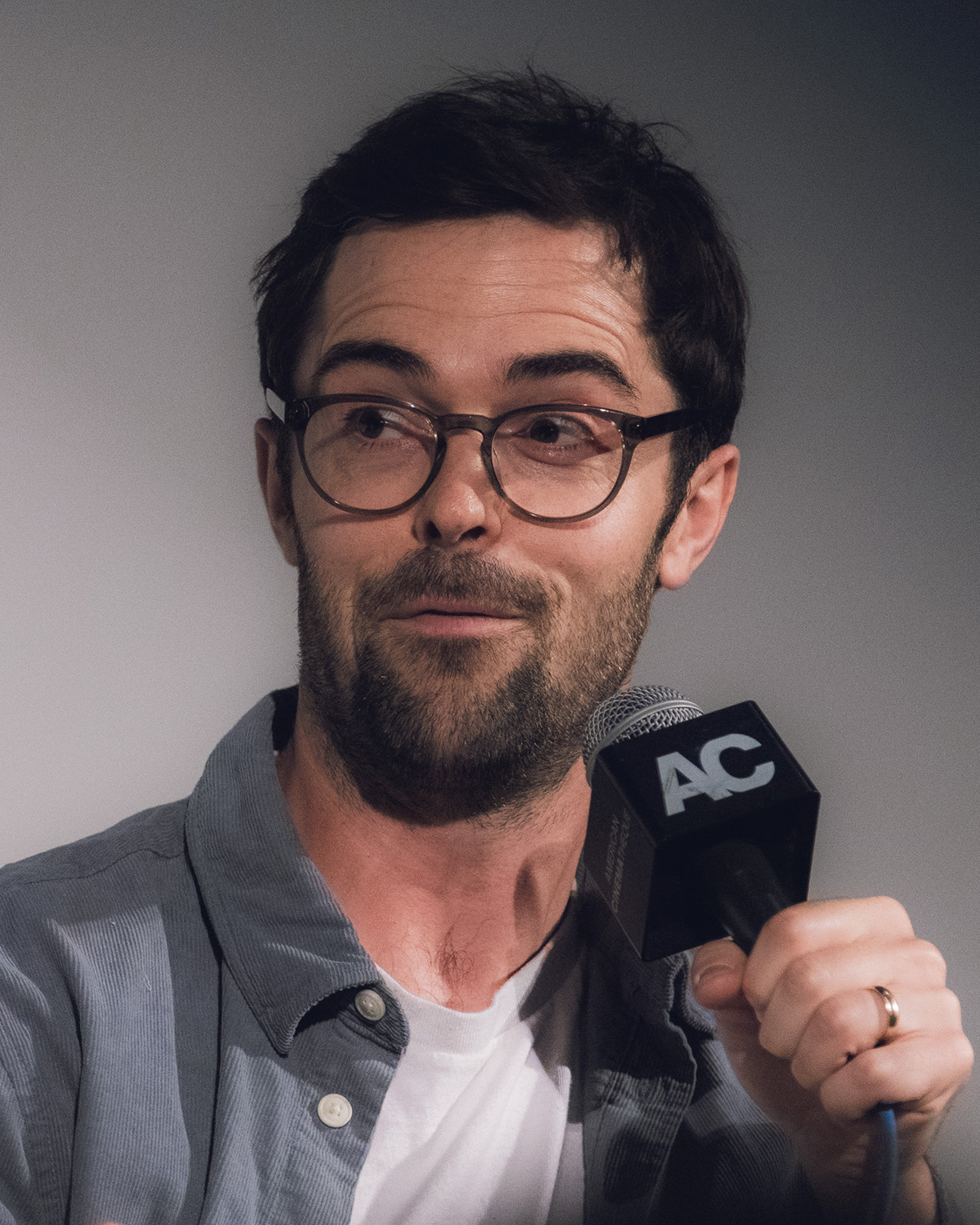
Filmmakers Dan Berk and Robert Olsen were in charge of making the film.

In October 2023, it was announced that Jack Quaid would star in the action comedy film Novocaine, directed by Dan Berk and Robert Olsen and written by Lars Jacobson. It is the first film from FilmNation Entertainment's production label Infrared. In February 2024, Paramount Pictures acquired the film, with Amber Midthunder also announced as part of the cast. In March, Ray Nicholson, Jacob Batalon, Betty Gabriel, and Matt Walsh joined the cast of the film.

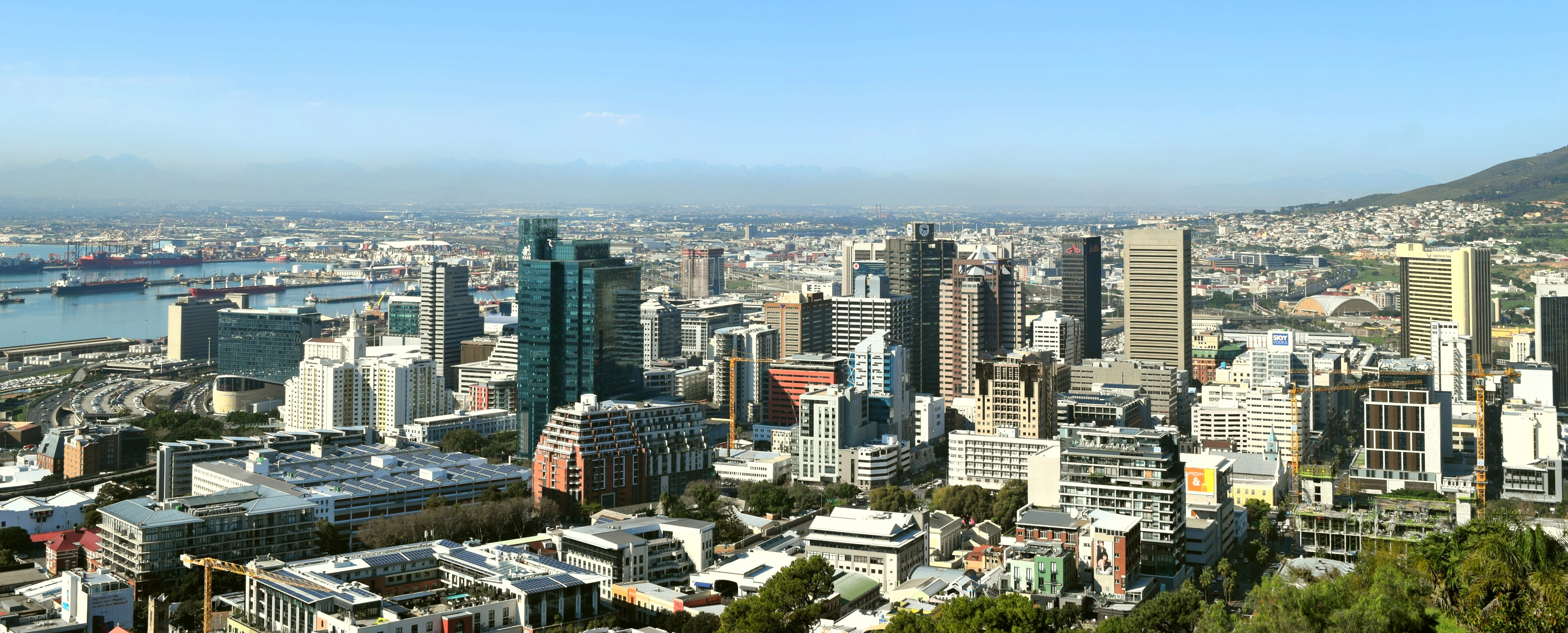
Cape Town, Western Cape. This location served as the setting for the film.

Principal photography began on April 8, 2024, in Cape Town, South Africa. The film was financed through Domain Entertainment as its first film with Paramount.

== Music ==
Novocaine also uses popular songs, including "Everybody Hurts" by R.E.M., "Silver Bells" by Andy Williams, "Mist of a Dream" by Birdlegs and Pauline, "I Believe In A Thing Called Love" by The Darkness and "You’re the Inspiration" by Chicago. "Power Lines" by Telekinesis was used in the end credits.

== Release and reception ==
Novocaine was released in the United States on March 14, 2025.

=== Box office ===
Novocaine grossed $19.9 million in the United States and Canada, and $14.7 million in other territories, for a worldwide total of $34.5 million.

In the United States and Canada, Novocaine was released alongside Black Bag, Opus (which also starred Midthunder), The Last Supper, and the wide release of The Day the Earth Blew Up: A Looney Tunes Movie, and was projected to gross $7–12 million from 3,365 theaters in its opening weekend. The film made $3.9 million on its first day, including an estimated $1.8 million from preview screenings. It went on to debut to $8.8 million, topping the box office in the lowest-grossing weekend of 2025 to date ($54.7 million for all films in theaters). In its second weekend, the film made $3.7 million (a drop of 58%), falling to fourth place. The film dropped out of the box office top ten in its fourth weekend.

=== Critical response ===
On the review aggregator website Rotten Tomatoes, 81% of 203 critics' reviews are positive, with an average rating of 6.6/10. The website's consensus reads: "Getting an adrenaline shot from Jack Quaid and Amber Midthunder's considerable charm while finding increasingly demented ways to use its concept, Novocaine is the opposite of a pain to watch." Metacritic, which uses a weighted average, assigned the film a score of 58 out of 100, based on 38 critics, indicating "mixed or average" reviews. Audiences polled by CinemaScore gave the film an average grade of "B" on an A+ to F scale, while those surveyed by PostTrak gave it an 84% overall positive score, with 58% saying they would "definitely recommend" it.

Writing for the Chicago Tribune, Michael Phillips praised Jack Quaid and Amber Midthunder's performances, but felt the film ultimately "[squandered] a promising setup, with an unusually effective depiction of a romance in its first-date stage."
