= Eclipse (Trumbo novel) =

1935 novel by Dalton Trumbo

Eclipse is the debut novel of Dalton Trumbo first published in 1935.

The novel is about a town and its people written in the social realist style. The town, which Trumbo calls "Shale City," was modeled on Grand Junction, Colorado, where Trumbo lived from 1908 until he left for the University of Colorado in 1924. Trumbo's daughter Nikola writes in a foreword to a new edition of Eclipse that the character John Abbott was a substitute for Trumbo's father and "was based on the real-life Grand Junction citizen W.J. Moyer, (who) was also destroyed (as his father had been) by the depression."

The new edition, published by the Mesa County Public Library Foundation in 2005, includes a list that matches Grand Junction residents to characters in the book and acknowledges that the book's sometimes harsh portrayal of Grand Junction made it controversial in Trumbo's hometown.

== Editions ==
- Trumbo, Dalton. (2005). Eclipse. Mesa County Public Library Foundation. ISBN 0-9772015-0-3
