= Rick Leed =

American television and film producer

- Born: January 9, 1955; New York City, U.S.
- Died: August 31, 2017 (aged 62)
- Education: Islip High School; Northwestern University
- Occupations: Television and film producer
- Notable work: Where the Heart Is; Company Man; Dr. 90210
- Spouse: Joe Zipkin
- Children: 2
- Parent(s): Marvin Leed; Shirley Leed

Rick Leed (January 9, 1955 – August 31, 2017) was an American television and film producer best known as the creator and executive producer of Dr. 90210 series, which premiered in 2004 and ran for six seasons on E!. He also served as executive producer on feature films Where the Heart Is and Company Man.

While he served as president of Wind Dancer, the production house produced the sitcom Home Improvement and romantic comedy film What Women Want. Leed was also instrumental in the launch of Comedy Central's television series Mystery Science Theater 3000 for which he was credited with a special thanks. As an agent, Leed represented several creative talents, including Aaron Sorkin, Rowan Atkinson and Ian McKellen.

Leed died on August 31, 2017. He left a partner and two children.
