= Audience Award Documentary =

Film award

This is the list of winners of the Sundance Film Festival Audience Award for documentary features.

== Winners ==
=== 1980s ===
- 1989: For All Mankind

=== 1990s ===
- 1990: Berkeley in the Sixties
- 1991: American Dream
- 1992: Brother's Keeper
- 1993: Something Within Me
- 1994: Hoop Dreams
- 1995: Ballot Measure 9 / Unzipped
- 1996: Troublesome Creek: A Midwestern
- 1997: Paul Monette: The Brink of Summer's End
- 1998: Out of the Past
- 1999: Genghis Blues

=== 2000s ===
- 2000: Dark Days
- 2001: Dogtown and Z-Boys / Scout's Honor
- 2002: Amandla!: A Revolution in Four-Part Harmony
- 2003: My Flesh and Blood
- 2004: Born into Brothels
- 2005: Murderball
- 2006: God Grew Tired of Us
- 2007: Hear and Now
- 2008: Fuel
- 2009: The Cove

=== 2010s ===
- 2010: Waiting for "Superman"
- 2011: Buck
- 2012: The Invisible War
- 2013: Blood Brother
- 2014: Alive Inside: A Story of Music and Memory
- 2015: Meru
- 2016: Jim: The James Foley Story
- 2017: Chasing Coral
- 2018: The Sentence
- 2019: Knock Down the House

=== 2020s ===
- 2020: Crip Camp
- 2021: Summer of Soul
- 2022: Navalny
- 2023: Beyond Utopia
- 2024: Daughters
- 2025: André Is an Idiot
- 2026: American Pachuco: The Legend of Luis Valdez

== International winners ==
- 2004: The Corporation
- 2006: No One
- 2007: In the Shadow of the Moon
- 2009: Afghan Star
- 2010: Waste Land
- 2011: Senna
- 2012: Searching for Sugar Man
- 2014: The Green Prince
- 2015: Dark Horse
- 2016: Sonita
- 2017: Joshua: Teenager vs. Superpower
- 2018: This Is Home
- 2019: Sea of Shadows
- 2020: The Reason I Jump
- 2021: Writing with Fire
- 2022: The Territory
- 2023: 20 Days in Mariupol
- 2024: Ibelin
- 2025: Prime Minister
- 2026: One In A Million
