= Atlas (2024 film) =

2024 American film by Brad Peyton

- Promotional release poster
- Directed by: Brad Peyton
- Written by: Leo Sardarian; Aron Eli Coleite
- Produced by: Brad Peyton; Jeff Fierson; Joby Harold; Tory Tunnell; Jennifer Lopez; Elaine Goldsmith-Thomas; Benny Medina; Greg Berlanti; Sarah Schechter
- Starring: Jennifer Lopez; Simu Liu; Sterling K. Brown; Mark Strong
- Cinematography: John Schwartzman
- Edited by: Bob Ducsay
- Music by: Andrew Lockington
- Production companies: ASAP Entertainment; Safehouse Pictures; Nuyorican Productions; Berlanti-Schechter Films
- Distributed by: Netflix
- Release date: May 24, 2024
- Running time: 120 minutes
- Country: United States
- Language: English
- Budget: $100 million

Atlas is a 2024 American science fiction action film starring Jennifer Lopez as a skilled counterterrorism analyst, who harbors a profound distrust of AI, and who comes to realize that it may be her sole recourse following the failure of a mission aimed at apprehending a rogue robot. The film is directed by Brad Peyton and written by Leo Sardarian and Aron Eli Coleite. The film also stars Simu Liu, Sterling K. Brown, and Mark Strong.

A co-production of ASAP Entertainment, Safehouse Pictures, Nuyorican Productions and Berlanti-Schechter Films, Atlas was released by Netflix on May 24, 2024. It was negatively received by critics, but was successful on Netflix, reaching the platform's Top 10 list in 93 countries, including the number-one spot in 71 of them.

== Plot ==
In 2043, the humanoid artificial intelligence Harlan leads a machine uprising against humanity. The newly-formed International Coalition of Nations (ICN) eventually force Harlan to flee into outer space. Twenty-eight years later, analyst Atlas Shepherd discovers that Harlan escaped to a planet in the Andromeda Galaxy after one of Harlan's agents is captured and interrogated. She insists on accompanying the military mission to find and capture Harlan, using AI-assisted mecha known as ARCs.

Moments before the ARC-equipped ICN Rangers descend to the planet, Harlan's drones attack their orbiting ship. Atlas is forced to enter an ARC herself and falls to the planet as the ship crash-lands. Atlas manages to gain basic control of the ARC despite her distrust of the onboard AI, who introduces itself as Smith. Atlas orders Smith to head to the planned drop point, where she finds the rest of the rangers dead. She reluctantly agrees to directly interface her mind with Smith, allowing for greater control of the ARC. As they journey towards a rescue pod, Atlas and Smith begin to bond, and she reveals that her mother was Harlan's designer.

Although running low on power, Atlas convinces Smith to head to Harlan's base in order to tag it for a long-range strike. However, after placing a beacon at the base, Smith is hacked and disabled. Atlas is captured and brought to Harlan, who plans to destroy most of humanity and give the chosen survivors a chance to thrive under AI guidance. To do so, Harlan lured the military to the planet in order to steal the ship – and its carbon bombs, which will burn Earth's atmosphere.

Harlan extracts the security codes from Atlas in order to get past Earth's defenses, then leaves her to die with Colonel Banks, the only other survivor of the mission. After Banks gives her his ARC neural interface device, Atlas remotely reactivates Smith, who comes to their rescue. Using salvaged parts from the other destroyed ARCs, Atlas upgrades Smith to stand a chance against Harlan's assembled forces.

Atlas further reveals to Smith that Harlan killed her mother after she gave Harlan an unfettered interface with her mind. Harlan, programmed to save humanity from risk, then saw that humanity's history of destructive behavior made it a risk to itself. Smith helps Atlas overcome her guilt, and Banks sacrifices himself to clear their path. Atlas and Smith fight their way out and destroy the repaired ship before defeating Harlan in hand-to-hand combat – though Atlas and Smith are badly injured. Smith shuts down before Atlas is rescued after repeated defibrillation.

Back on Earth, Atlas is informed that Harlan's complicated CPU will take years to analyze. Now a ranger, she tests the newest model of ARC, created with her suggested modifications reminiscent of Smith. As she boots up the new ARC, its AI repeats a specific phrase Atlas made during the final moments of the mission, then jokingly tells her to guess its name, suggesting that Smith, in some form, survived.

== Cast ==
- Jennifer Lopez as Atlas Shepherd
- Simu Liu as Harlan Shepherd
- Sterling K. Brown as Colonel Elias Banks
- Gregory James Cohan as Smith (voice)
- Abraham Popoola as Casca Decius
- Lana Parrilla as Val Shepherd
- Mark Strong as General Jake Boothe

== Production ==
The screenplay was originally written by Leo Sardarian, and Aron Eli Coleite performed rewrites. Simu Liu, Sterling K. Brown, and Abraham Popoola joined the cast in August 2022, and Lana Parrilla was confirmed to star in September 2022. Principal photography began on August 26, 2022, in Los Angeles and New Zealand, and wrapped on November 26.

== Release ==
=== Streaming ===
Atlas was released by Netflix on May 24, 2024. The film debuted at number one on Netflix's most popular English films list with 28.2 million views (or 56.3 million viewing hours), making it the most watched title for the week (May 20–26). Atlas reached Netflix's Top 10 list in 93 countries and was placed at number one in 71 countries.

By June 5, 2024, Atlas accumulated 60 million global views (or 119.4 million viewing hours), making it the fourth film that stars Lopez to top the streaming charts in two years, after Shotgun Wedding (2022), The Mother (2023), and This Is Me... Now: A Love Story (2024), and the second-most-watched title of Lopez's on Netflix. The streamer reported the viewer completion rate for Atlas to be 80%.

== Reception ==
=== Critical response ===
The film was not well received by critics. (Note: Some publications reported that the critical reception was mixed, while others stated that it was more negative.) On the review aggregator website Rotten Tomatoes, 17% of 110 critics' reviews are positive, with an average rating of 3.8/10. The website's consensus reads: "Jennifer Lopez admirably does her best to shoulder Atlas's seismic scope, but this sci-fi spectacle buckles under the weight of a script whose intelligence is merely artificial." Metacritic, which uses a weighted average, assigned the film a score of 37 out of 100, based on 27 critics, indicating "generally unfavorable" reviews.

The New York Times wrote in a review, "It's an intriguing concept, since an open question both onscreen and in real life is whether A.I. is inherently good, or bad, or neutral, or some other fourth thing we haven't quite put words to yet." The New York Times also praised Lopez's performance in the film, writing, "Lopez, who was also a producer on the movie, flings herself into the role with abandon, the kind of performance that's especially impressive given that she's largely by herself throughout." Space.com wrote in a favorable review, "It boasts impressive performances by its likable cast, inspired action sequences, and breathtaking visual effects, confidently led by a spirited director who understands the bulletproof mechanics of traditional three-act structure." In a mixed review, The Guardian wrote that Atlas "plays like it was made two decades ago." The Hollywood Reporter described Atlas as "another Netflix movie made to half-watch while doing laundry".

=== Accolades ===
Award	Date of ceremony	Category	Recipient(s)	Result	Ref.
Golden Raspberry Awards	February 28, 2025	Worst Actress	Jennifer Lopez	Nominated	
Golden Reel Awards	February 23, 2025	Outstanding Achievement in Sound Editing – Non-Theatrical Feature	Per Hallberg (supervising sound editor), Ann Scibelli (supervising sound designer), Eric A. Norris, Stephen P. Robinson, Jonathan Title (sound effects editors), Daniel Irwin (supervising adr editor), Laura Harris Atkinson, Taylor Jackson, John Stuver (dialogue editors), Willard J. Overstreet (supervising foley editor), Gary Hecker (supervising foley artist), and Michael Horton (foley artist)	Nominated	
