= Trumbo (2007 film) =

- Directed by: Peter Askin
- Written by: Christopher Trumbo
- Produced by: Will Battersby; Alan Klingenstein; Tory Tunnell; David Viola
- Starring: Dalton Trumbo
- Cinematography: Jonathan Furmanski; Fred Murphy; Chris Norr; Frank Prinzi
- Edited by: Kurt Engfehr
- Music by: Robert Miller
- Production companies: Red Envelope Entertainment; Filbert Steps Productions; Safehouse Pictures; Reno Productions
- Distributed by: Magnolia Pictures; Samuel Goldwyn Films
- Release dates: September 10, 2007 (Toronto International Film Festival); June 27, 2008 (US)
- Running time: 96 minutes
- Country: United States
- Language: English

Trumbo is a 2007 American documentary film directed by Peter Askin, produced by Will Battersby, Tory Tunnell, Alan Klingenstein, and David Viola, executive produced by Jim Kohlberg, and written by Christopher Trumbo. It is based on the letters of Christopher Trumbo's father, Dalton Trumbo, an Oscar-winning screenwriter who was imprisoned and blacklisted as a member of the Hollywood Ten, ten screenwriters, directors and producers who refused to testify before the House Un-American Activities Committee (HUAC) in 1947 during the committee's investigation of Communist influences in the Hollywood film industry.

The film debuted at the Toronto International Film Festival and includes film clips and interviews, readings from Trumbo's letters by performers such as Michael Douglas, Joan Allen, Donald Sutherland, Liam Neeson, and Paul Giamatti, and a reenactment by David Strathairn of a speech given by Dalton Trumbo in 1970. The readings include parts of what the New York Times calls "Dalton Trumbo's remarkably stage-ready personal letters" that cover the period from the late 1940s to the early 1960s. Interspersed with these are archival clips from the HUAC hearings, footage from home movies, and "exceptionally well-selected interview clips with Trumbo".

== Reception ==
Rotten Tomatoes, a review aggregator, reports that 82% of 55 surveyed critics gave the film a positive review; the average rating was 6.8/10. The site's consensus reads: "Trumbo celebrates the life and work of blacklisted screenwriter Dalton Trumbo with measures of humor and sadness." Metacritic rated the film 71/100 based on 18 reviews.
