= Dalton Trumbo =

American screenwriter (1905–1976)

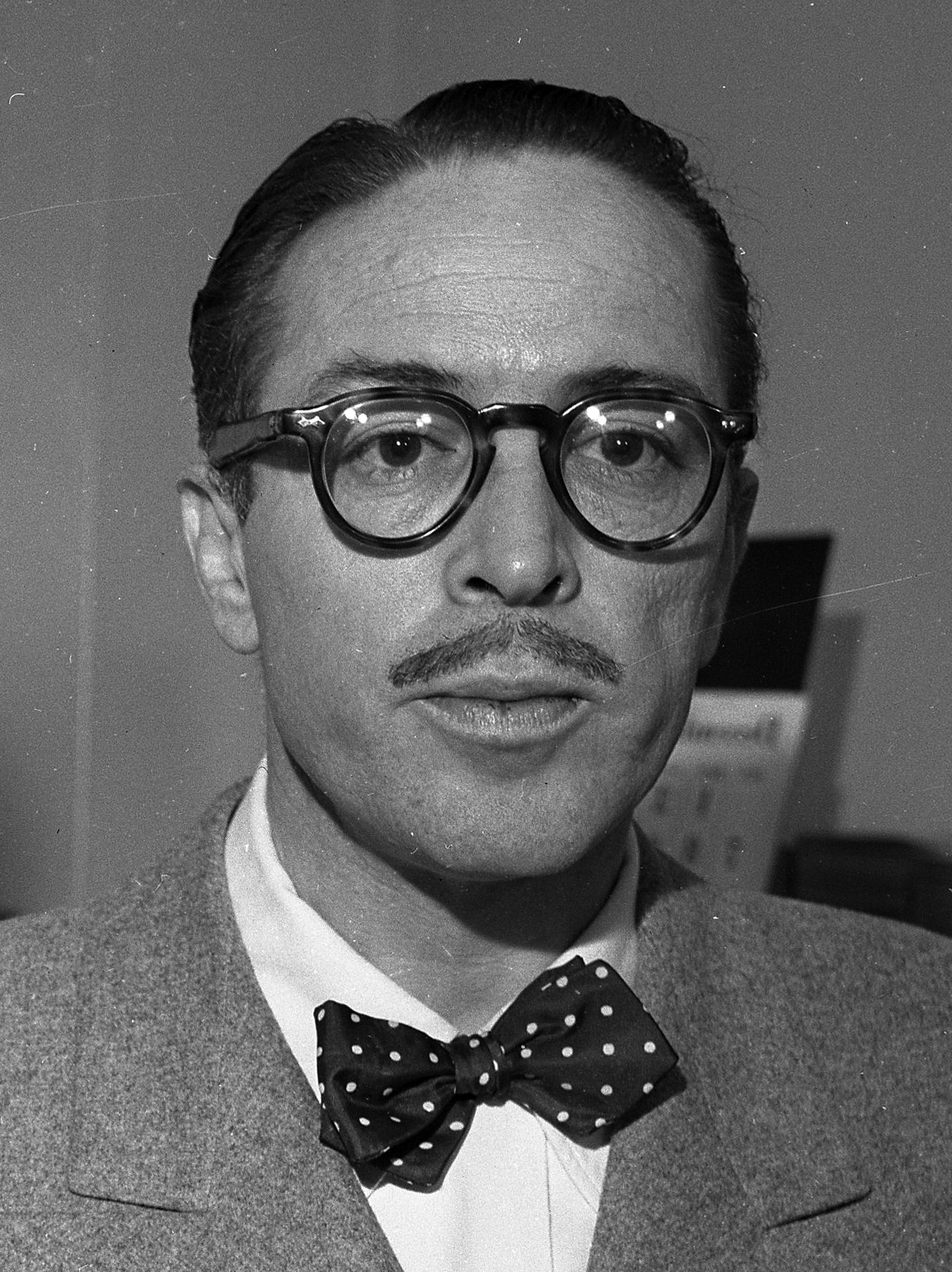
- Trumbo in 1947
- Born: James Dalton Trumbo; December 9, 1905; Montrose, Colorado, U.S.
- Died: September 10, 1976 (aged 70); Los Angeles, California, U.S.
- Occupations: Screenwriter; film director; playwright; essayist; novelist
- Spouse: Cleo Beth Fincher (m. 1938)
- Children: 3, including Christopher

James Dalton Trumbo (December 9, 1905 – September 10, 1976) was an American screenwriter who scripted many award-winning films, including Thirty Seconds Over Tokyo (1944), Roman Holiday (1953), Spartacus (1960), and Exodus (1960). One of the Hollywood Ten, he refused to testify before the House Un-American Activities Committee (HUAC) in 1947 during the committee's investigation of Communist influences in the motion picture industry.

Trumbo, the other members of the Hollywood Ten, and hundreds of other professionals in the industry were blacklisted by Hollywood. He continued working clandestinely on major films, writing under pseudonyms or other authors' names. His uncredited work won two Academy Awards for Best Story: for Roman Holiday (1953), which was presented to a front writer, and for The Brave One (1956), which was awarded to a pseudonym used by Trumbo. When he was given public screen credit for both Exodus and Spartacus in 1960, it marked the beginning of the end of the Hollywood Blacklist for Trumbo and other affected screenwriters. He finally was given full credit by the Writers' Guild for Roman Holiday in 2011, nearly 60 years after the fact, and 35 years after his death.

== Origins ==
Trumbo was born in Montrose, Colorado, on December 9, 1905, the son of Orus Bonham Trumbo and Maud (née Tillery) Trumbo. His family moved to Grand Junction, Colorado, in 1908.

His paternal immigrant ancestor, a Protestant of Swiss origin named Jacob Trumbo, settled in the colony of Virginia in 1736. Orus Trumbo worked variously as a shoe clerk and collection agent, never earning enough to keep the family far from poverty.

Trumbo graduated from Grand Junction High School. While still in high school, he worked for Walter Walker as a cub reporter for the Grand Junction Daily Sentinel, covering courts, the high school, the mortuary and civic organizations. He attended the University of Colorado at Boulder in 1924 and 1925, working as a reporter for the Boulder Daily Camera and contributing to the school's humor magazine, yearbook, and newspaper. He was a member of Delta Tau Delta International Fraternity.

In 1924, Orus Trumbo relocated the family to California. Shortly after, he fell ill and died, leaving Dalton to support his mother and siblings. For nine years after his father died, Trumbo worked the night shift wrapping bread at a Los Angeles bakery and attended the University of California, Los Angeles (1926) and the University of Southern California (1928–1930). During this time, he wrote movie reviews, 88 short stories, and six novels, all of which were rejected for publication.

== Career ==
=== Early career ===
Trumbo began his professional writing career in the early 1930s, when several of his articles and stories were published in mainstream magazines, including McCall's, Vanity Fair, the Hollywood Spectator and The Saturday Evening Post. Trumbo was hired as managing editor of the Hollywood Spectator in 1934. Later he left the magazine to become a reader in the story department at Warner Bros. studio.

His first published novel, Eclipse (1935), was released during the Great Depression. Writing in the social realist style, Trumbo drew on his years in Grand Junction to portray a town and its people. The book was controversial in his hometown, where many people took issue with his fictional portrayal.

Trumbo started working in movies in 1937 but continued writing prose. His anti-war novel Johnny Got His Gun won one of the early National Book Awards: the Most Original Book of 1939. It was inspired by an article Trumbo had read several years earlier: an account of a hospital visit by the Prince of Wales to a Canadian soldier who had lost all his limbs in World War I.

During the late 1930s and early 1940s, Trumbo became one of Hollywood's highest-paid screenwriters, at about $4,000 per week while on assignment, and earning as much as $80,000 in one year. He worked on such films as Thirty Seconds Over Tokyo (1944), Our Vines Have Tender Grapes (1945), and Kitty Foyle (1940), for which he was nominated for an Academy Award for Best Adapted Screenplay.

=== Political advocacy and blacklisting ===
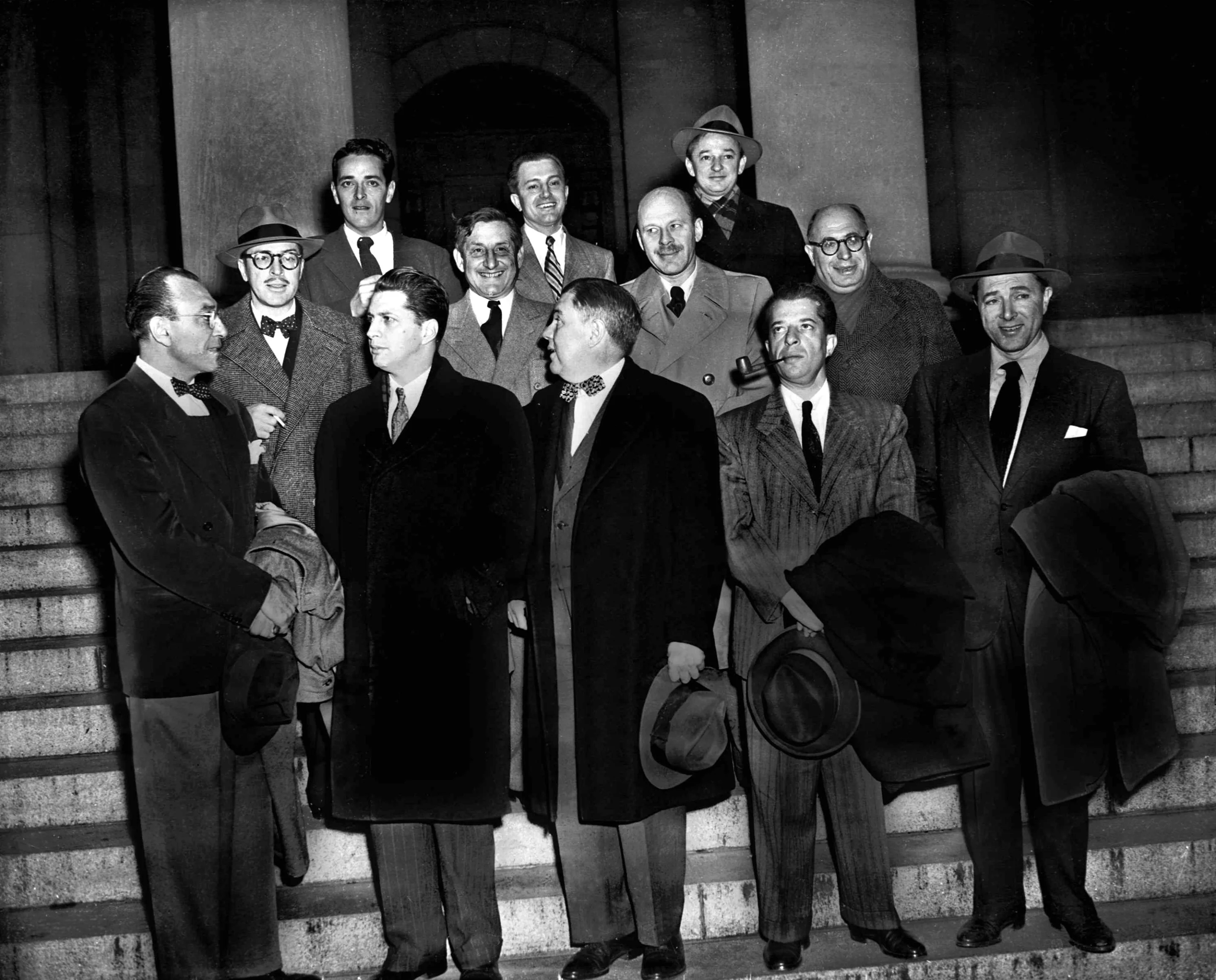
"The Hollywood Ten" stand with their attorneys outside district court in Washington, D.C. before arraignment on contempt of Congress charges. The ten were charged for refusing to cooperate with the House Un-American Activities Committee. (Front row, L-R): Herbert Biberman, attorney Martin Popper, attorney Robert W. Kenny, Albert Maltz and Lester Cole. (Second row, L-R): Dalton Trumbo, John Howard Lawson, Alvah Bessie and Samuel Ornitz. (Top row, L-R): Ring Lardner Jr., Edward Dmytryk and Adrian Scott.

Aligned with the Communist Party USA before the 1940s, Trumbo was an isolationist. He joined the Communist Party in 1943, and remained active until 1947. He reaffiliated himself with the party in 1954. His novel The Remarkable Andrew featured the ghost of President Andrew Jackson appearing to caution the United States against getting involved in World War II and in support of the Nazi-Soviet pact.

Shortly after Operation Barbarossa, the Axis invasion of the Soviet Union in 1941, Trumbo and his publisher decided to suspend reprinting Johnny Got His Gun until the end of the war. During the war, Trumbo received letters from individuals "denouncing Jews" and using Johnny to support their arguments for "an immediate negotiated peace" with Nazi Germany; Trumbo reported these correspondents to the FBI. Trumbo regretted this decision, which he called "foolish". After two FBI agents showed up at his home, he understood that "their interest lay not in the letters but in me".

In a 1946 article titled "The Russian Menace" published in Rob Wagner's Script Magazine, Trumbo wrote from the perspective of a post-World War II Russian citizen. He argued that Russians were likely fearful of the mass of U.S. military power that surrounded them, at a time when any sympathetic view toward Communist countries was viewed with suspicion. He ended the article by stating, "If I were a Russian ... I would be alarmed, and I would petition my government to take measures at once against what would seem an almost certain blow aimed at my existence. This is how it must appear in Russia today". He argued that the U.S. was a "menace" to Russia, rather than the more popular American view of Russia as the "red menace". According to author Kenneth Billingsley, Trumbo had bragged in The Daily Worker that Communist influence in Hollywood had prevented films from being made from anti-Communist books, such as Arthur Koestler's Darkness at Noon and The Yogi and the Commissar.

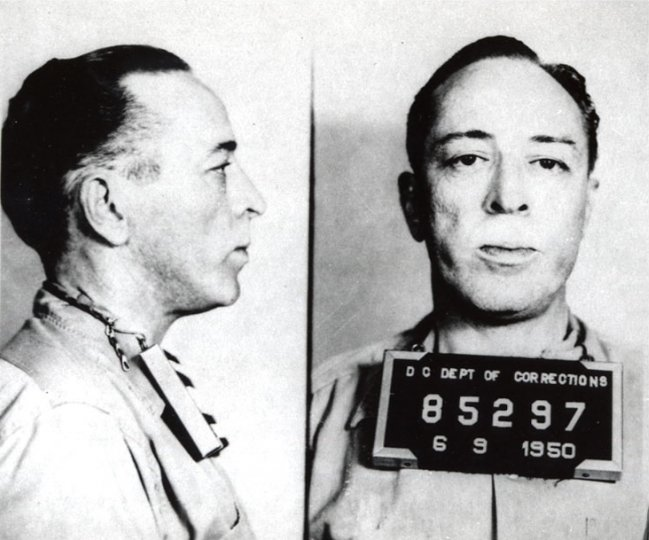
Trumbo's Ashland Penitentiary mugshot, June 9, 1950

William R. Wilkerson, publisher and founder of The Hollywood Reporter, published a July 29, 1946, "TradeView" column entitled "A Vote For Joe Stalin". It named Trumbo and several others as Communist sympathizers, the first persons identified on what became known as "Billy's Blacklist". In October 1947, drawing upon these names, the House Un-American Activities Committee (HUAC) summoned Trumbo and nine others to testify for their investigation as to whether Communist agents and sympathizers had surreptitiously planted propaganda in U.S. films. The writers refused to give information about their own or any other person's involvement and were convicted for contempt of Congress. They appealed the conviction to the Supreme Court on First Amendment grounds and lost. Trumbo served eleven months in the federal penitentiary in Ashland, Kentucky, in 1950. In the 1976 documentary Hollywood On Trial, Trumbo said: "As far as I was concerned, it was a completely just verdict. I had contempt for that Congress and have had contempt for it ever since. And on the basis of guilt or innocence, I could never really complain very much. That this was a crime or misdemeanor was the complaint, my complaint."

The MPAA issued a statement that Trumbo and his compatriots would not be permitted to work in the industry unless they disavowed Communism under oath. After completing his sentence, Trumbo sold his ranch and moved his family to Mexico City with Hugo Butler and his wife Jean Rouverol, who had also been blacklisted. In Mexico, Trumbo wrote 30 scripts (under pseudonyms) for B-movie studios such as King Brothers Productions. In the case of Gun Crazy (1950), adapted from a short story by MacKinlay Kantor, Kantor agreed to be the front for Trumbo's screenplay. Trumbo's role in the screenplay was not revealed until 1992.

During this blacklist period, Trumbo also wrote The Brave One (1956) for the King Brothers. Like Roman Holiday, it received an Academy Award for Best Story he could not claim. The script was credited to Robert Rich, a name borrowed from a nephew of the producers. Trumbo recalled earning an average fee of $1,750 per film for 18 screenplays written in two years and said, "None was very good".

He published The Devil in the Book, an analysis of the conviction of 14 California Smith Act defendants, in 1956. The statute set criminal penalties for advocating the overthrow of the U.S. government and required all non-citizen adult residents to register with the government.

=== Later career ===
Ingo Preminger, the brother of producer-director Otto Preminger, was Dalton Trumbo's agent. Otto Preminger hired Trumbo to write a screenplay for the film he intended to adapt from Leon Uris' 1958 novel Exodus when the script he had commissioned from Uris was deemed unusable. The producer-director decided to give Trumbo the screen credit. Shortly thereafter, actor Kirk Douglas announced Trumbo had written the screenplay for Stanley Kubrick's film Spartacus (also 1960), adapted from the 1951 novel by Howard Fast. With these actions, Preminger and Douglas helped end the power of the blacklist.

Trumbo was reinstated into the Writers Guild of America, West and was credited on all subsequent scripts. The guild finally gave him full credit for the script of the 1953 film Roman Holiday in 2011. Trumbo directed the 1971 film adaptation of his novel Johnny Got His Gun, starring Timothy Bottoms, Diane Varsi, Jason Robards and Donald Sutherland. One of the last films Trumbo wrote, Executive Action (1973), was based on the John F. Kennedy assassination. The academy officially recognized Trumbo as the winner of the Oscar for the 1956 film The Brave One in 1975, presenting him with a statuette.

== Personal life ==
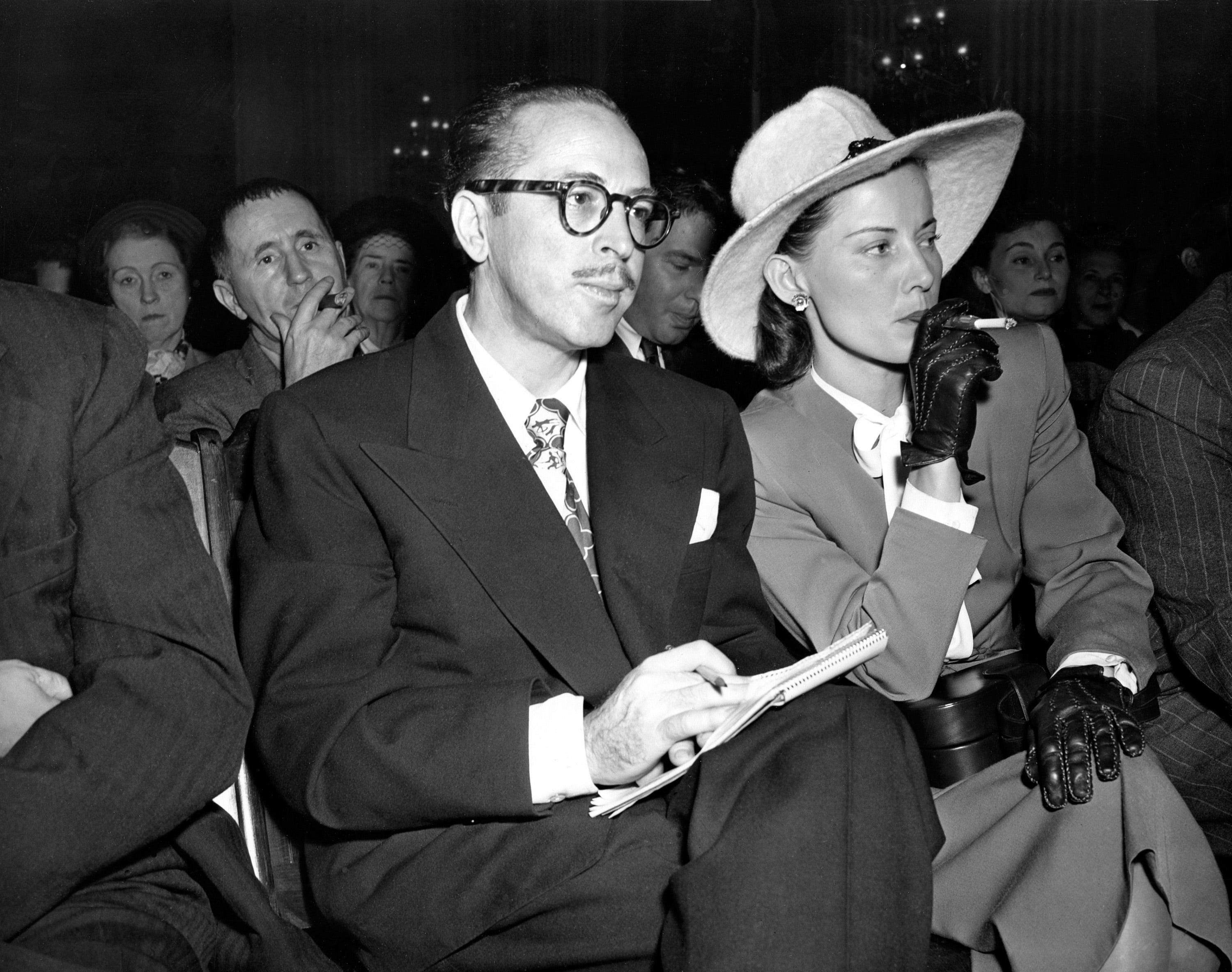
Dalton Trumbo with wife Cleo at House Un-American Activities Committee hearings, 1947. German poet and Marxist Bertolt Brecht is visible in the background.

In 1938, Trumbo married Cleo Fincher, who was born in Fresno, California, on July 17, 1916, and had moved with her divorced mother and her brother and sister to Los Angeles. The Trumbos had three children: Nikola Trumbo (1939–2018), who became a psychotherapist; Christopher Trumbo (1940–2011), a filmmaker and screenwriter who became an expert on the Hollywood blacklist; and Melissa Trumbo (1945), known as Mitzi, a photographer. Mitzi Trumbo dated comedian Steve Martin when they were both in their early 20s, which is recounted in Martin's 2007 book Born Standing Up. Martin wrote of her: "Mitzi became my official photographer, and she snapped dozens of rolls of film, all to find the perfect publicity photo."

Cleo Trumbo died of natural causes at the age of 93 on October 9, 2009, at the home she shared with Mitzi Trumbo in Los Altos, California.

== Death and legacy ==
Trumbo died in 1976, in Los Angeles of a heart attack at the age of 70. He donated his body to scientific research.

In 1993, Trumbo was posthumously awarded the Academy Award for writing Roman Holiday (1953). The screen credit and award were previously given to Ian McLellan Hunter, who had been a front for Trumbo. A new statue was made for this award because Hunter's son refused to hand over the one his father had received.

In 2003, Christopher Trumbo mounted an Off-Broadway play based on his father's letters, called Trumbo: Red, White and Blacklisted, in which a wide variety of actors played his father during the run, including Nathan Lane, Tim Robbins, Brian Dennehy, Ed Harris, Chris Cooper and Gore Vidal. He adapted it as the documentary Trumbo (2007), which added archival footage and new interviews.

A dramatization of Trumbo's life, also called Trumbo, was released in November 2015. It starred Bryan Cranston in the title role and was directed by Jay Roach. For his portrayal of Trumbo, Cranston was nominated for Best Actor at the 88th Academy Awards.

The moving image collection of Trumbo is held at the Academy Film Archive and consists primarily of extensive 35 mm production materials relating to the 1971 anti-war film Johnny Got His Gun. In 2016, more than a hundred years after his birth, Trumbo was honored by the installation of a statue of him in front of the Avalon Theater on Main Street in Grand Junction, Colorado, his home town. He was depicted writing a screenplay in a bathtub.

Trumbo is featured in the 2024 biographical historical drama Reagan about U.S. president Ronald Reagan. He is portrayed by Sean Hankinson.

== Works ==
Selected film works

- Road Gang, 1936
- Love Begins at 20, 1936
- Devil's Playground, 1937
- Fugitives for a Night, 1938
- A Man to Remember, 1938
- Five Came Back, 1939 (with Nathanael West and J. Cody)
- Sorority House, 1939
- Curtain Call, 1940
- A Bill of Divorcement, 1940
- Kitty Foyle, 1940
- The Lone Wolf Strikes, 1940
- You Belong to Me, 1941 (story by)
- The Remarkable Andrew, 1942
- Tender Comrade, 1944
- A Guy Named Joe, 1944
- Thirty Seconds Over Tokyo, 1944
- Our Vines Have Tender Grapes, 1945
- Gun Crazy, 1950 (co-writer, front: Millard Kaufman)
- He Ran All the Way, 1951 (co-writer, front: Guy Endore)
- The Prowler, 1951 (uncredited with Hugo Butler)
- Roman Holiday, 1953 (front: Ian McLellan Hunter)
- They Were So Young 1954, (under pseudonym Felix Lutzkendorf)
- The Boss, 1956 (front: Ben L. Perry)
- The Brave One, 1956 (under pseudonym Robert Rich)
- The Green-Eyed Blonde, 1957 (front: Sally Stubblefield)
- From the Earth to the Moon, 1958 (co-writer, front: James Leicester)
- Cowboy, 1958 (front: Edmund H. North)
- Spartacus, 1960, dir. by Stanley Kubrick (based on Howard Fast's 1951 novel of the same name)
- Exodus, 1960, dir. by Otto Preminger (based on Leon Uris' 1958 novel of the same name)
- The Last Sunset, 1961
- Town Without Pity, 1961
- Lonely are the Brave, 1962
- The Sandpiper, 1965
- Hawaii, 1966 (based on the novel by James Michener, 1959)
- The Fixer, 1968
- Johnny Got His Gun, 1971 (also directed)
- The Horsemen, 1971
- F.T.A., 1972
- Executive Action, 1973
- Papillon, 1973 (based on the novel by Henri Charrière, 1969)
- Cortes, 2020 (based on his screenplay Montezuma)

Novels, plays and essays

- Eclipse, 1935
- Washington Jitters, 1936
- Johnny Got His Gun, 1939
- The Remarkable Andrew, 1940 (also known as Chronicle of a Literal Man)
- The Biggest Thief in Town, 1949 (play)
- The Time Out of the Toad, 1972 (essays)
- Night of the Aurochs, 1979 (unfinished, ed. R. Kirsch)
- Half A Sinner (1940, Universal Pictures) based on original story by Dalton Trumbo

Non-fiction

- Harry Bridges : a discussion of the latest effort to deport civil liberties and the rights of American labor, New York : League of American Writers, 1941
- The time of the toad : a study of inquisition in America by one of the Hollywood Ten, Hollywood, California; The Hollywood Ten, 1949
- The Devil in the Book, 1956
- Additional Dialogue: Letters of Dalton Trumbo, 1942–62, 1970 (ed. by H. Manfull)
