= André Is an Idiot =

2025 American documentary film

- Theatrical release poster
- Directed by: Tony Benna
- Produced by: Joshua Altman; Ben Cotner; Stelio Kitrilakis; André Ricciardi; Tory Tunnell
- Starring: André Ricciardi
- Cinematography: Ethan Indorf
- Edited by: Tony Benna; Parker Laramie
- Music by: Dan Deacon
- Production companies: A24; Sandbox Films; Safehouse Pictures
- Distributed by: Joint Venture
- Release dates: January 24, 2025 (Sundance); March 6, 2026 (United States)
- Running time: 89 minutes
- Country: United States
- Language: English

André Is an Idiot is a 2025 American documentary film by Tony Benna. The film premiered at the 2025 Sundance Film Festival, and was given a limited theatrical release on March 6, 2026, by Joint Venture.

== Summary ==
It explores the story of André Ricciardi, who considers himself an idiot for not getting a colonoscopy and gets a terminal cancer diagnosis.

== Release ==
The film premiered at the Sundance Film Festival on January 24, 2025. The film had a limited theatrical release in the United States on March 6, 2026, by Joint Venture. The film was released a month early in the United Kingdom by Dogwoof.

== Reception ==
=== Critical response ===
On the review aggregator website Rotten Tomatoes, 97% of 60 critics' reviews are positive. The website's consensus reads: "A public service announcement with a disarming sense of humor, André is an Idiot brings a light touch to a morbid topic and is all the more powerful for it." Metacritic, which uses a weighted average, assigned the film a score of 78 out of 100, based on 13 critics, indicating "generally favorable" reviews.

Peter Howell of the Toronto Star considers the film one of his 10 favorite films from the Sundance Film Festival. Leslie Felperin of The Guardian rated the film four out of five and called it "a riotously funny, painfully honest film about facing death."

=== Accolades ===
It won the Audience Award and the Jonathan Oppenheim Editing Award in the US Documentary competition at the Sundance Film Festival.
