= Dear Zoe (film) =

2022 drama film

- Official release poster
- Directed by: Gren Wells
- Written by: Marc Lhormer; Melissa Martin
- Based on: Dear Zoe by Philip Beard
- Produced by: Marc Lhormer; Brenda Lhormer; Peter Phok; Christopher H. Warner
- Starring: Sadie Sink; Theo Rossi; Kweku Collins; Jessica Capshaw; Justin Bartha; Vivien Lyra Blair
- Cinematography: Joel Schwartz
- Edited by: Rachel Katz
- Music by: Michael Yezerski
- Production companies: Zin Haze Productions; Resonate Entertainment
- Distributed by: Freestyle Digital Media
- Release date: November 4, 2022
- Running time: 96 minutes
- Country: United States
- Language: English

Dear Zoe is a 2022 American drama film directed by Gren Wells from a screenplay by Marc Lhormer and Melissa Martin. It is an adaptation of the 2005 novel of the same name by Philip Beard. The film stars Sadie Sink, Theo Rossi, Kweku Collins, Jessica Capshaw, Justin Bartha, and Vivien Lyra Blair.

== Plot ==
Sixteen-year-old Tess DeNunzio lives in Pittsburgh with her mother Elly, stepfather David, and younger half-sister Em. Tess’s biological father Nick, a German Shepherd breeder, lives nearby in a poorer neighborhood in Braddock. After Tess’s three-year-old half-sister, Zoe, died in a hit-and-run accident on the day of the September 11 attacks while Tess was supposed to be watching her, Tess helped David care for Em while Elly coped with depression. The family attends therapy together, though Tess feels excluded from David and Elly’s grief. Tess has a breakdown after discovering of Elly's emotional affair with Justin, a much younger grocery store clerk. Tess moves in with Nick, though she regrets abandoning Em. Tess begins to care for one of Nick’s puppies. Nick agrees to drive Em home from school so that the sisters can spend time together. Tess and Nick attend church together, but she runs from the church screaming when a hymn reminds her of 9/11.

Tess is attracted to her neighbor, Jimmy Freeze, who claims to know her father. She offers him a beer, but Nick intervenes and instructs her not to socialize with him. When a suspicious man approaches Tess on the porch with a wad of cash, Tess realizes that Nick is dealing drugs out of the back of his truck. Tess confronts her father, but he doesn’t stop selling drugs. One night, Jimmy climbs through Tess’s window. While smoking weed together, Jimmy reveals he struggles to bond with his father and stepmother, and was sent to a correctional facility. He also discusses his mother’s death, though Tess doesn’t mention Zoe. They kiss goodnight. Jimmy continues to visit her at night, but Tess keeps their developing relationship a secret from Nick.

When summer begins, Em feels isolated, as she only sees Tess on rides home from school. Tess and Elly begin to have weekly phone calls, during which Tess notes that they’re both improving and Elly admits she’s afraid of losing Tess, which Tess promises won’t happen. Though missing Em and Elly, Tess continues to live with Nick, finding it easier to forget Zoe there. Jimmy gets Tess a summer job at Kennywood, an amusement park where he works. Soon, Jimmy and Tess profess their love for one another.

On the evening of Tess’s 17th birthday, Nick and Jimmy are both arrested; Tess realizes Jimmy sells drugs with her father. Her mother brings her presents; Tess tells her about the park and Jimmy. When Nick and Jimmy arrive home, Jimmy stays with Tess. They have sex for the first time and Tess tells Jimmy about Zoe: Tess missed the school bus, and her mother instructed her to watch Zoe outside. Tess ran inside to watch news coverage of 9/11, and returned to find Zoe stepping off the curb, only to be hit by a car. Jimmy assures Tess that he still loves her.

Tess moves back to her old house. Tess stands on the grass where Zoe landed after the car accident and cries. She reconciles with her mom, David and Em.

== Cast ==
- Sadie Sink as Tess DeNunzio
- Theo Rossi as Nick DeNunzio, Tess's father
- Kweku Collins as Jimmy Freeze
- Jessica Capshaw as Elly Gladstone, Tess's mother
- Justin Bartha as David Gladstone, Tess's stepfather
- Vivien Lyra Blair as Emily "Em" Gladstone, Tess's younger half-sister
- Mckenzie Noel Rusiewicz as Zoe Gladstone
- Tanyell Waivers as Vicky

== Production ==
Filming began in October 2019 in Pittsburgh, Pennsylvania and concluded in November 2019. The film spent an extended period of time in pre-production, with the novel originally optioned in 2010. Production occurred in Pittsburgh, with a primarily local crew.

== Release ==
The film was released in select theatres and on demand starting November 4, 2022. It was released on DVD on December 13, 2022. It was released on Blu-ray on February 14, 2023.

== Reception ==
On the review aggregator website Rotten Tomatoes, 71% of 14 critics' reviews are positive, with an average rating of 6.0/10.
