= Dear Zoe =

2004 novel by Philip Beard

- First edition
- Author: Philip Beard
- Language: English
- Genre: Novel
- Publisher: Viking Press
- Publication date: March 24, 2005
- Publication place: United States
- Media type: Print (hardback)
- Pages: 208 pp
- ISBN: 0-670-03401-0
- OCLC: 56111637
- Dewey Decimal: 813/.6 22
- LC Class: PS3602.E2525 D43 2005

Dear Zoe is an epistolary, young-adult novel by the American writer Philip Beard. which was first published in 2005. The narrator is fifteen-year-old Tess DeNunzio, who writes to her younger sister Zoe about her experiences after Zoe died. The novel is set in 2002 in Pittsburgh, Pennsylvania and follows Tess's first year of high school.

Dear Zoe tells the story of 15-year-old Tess DeNunzio, who is wracked by guilt after losing her half-sister in a hit-and-run accident on the day of the September 11 attacks. The novel was selected by Booklist, a magazine of the American Library Association, as one of the ten best first novels of 2005.

When Beard originally wrote this novel, he was advised by a friend to change the format from epistolary to first person. After he made these changes and sent the manuscript to publisher, the manuscript was rejected several times. It was not until he changed it back to being an epistolary novel that he was published. Beard had a hard time publishing "Dear Zoe". After being rejected so many times, he decided to self-publish. While he was in the process of self-publishing, he went to a bookstore near his house that his friend owned. His friend and owner of the bookstore gave a copy of his manuscript to a publisher at Penguin Books, which published it. "Dear Zoe" appeared in several best book lists and the American Library Association named it one of the best books in 2005.

== Background and writing ==
Beard took inspiration for Tess's character from his own stepdaughter who was Tess's age when he first started writing. Beard first started writing this novel before 9/11 happened. The death of Zoe was not planned until after 9/11. All Beard had originally planned was for Tess to go live with her biological father. The events of 9/11 inspired him to wonder how many other people died on that day that seemed to be forgotten about. Thus Beard's first novel was created. Beard had said in an interview that this book was emotionally draining to write. Once he was finished writing the book, Beard found it difficult to publish. His friend who owned a local bookstore gave his manuscript to a representative from Penguin Books. This representative gave the book to Viking, who contacted Beard about publishing it. After this Beard was published and Dear Zoe took off. The writing of "Dear Zoe" was very emotional for Beard but came naturally. While the chapters originated with numbers as their titles, Beard later decided to name each one. Some of the chapters were more difficult to name than others; Beard tried to find the heart of each chapter in the novel to name the chapter. According to Beard, the most difficult part of writing “Dear Zoe” was to keep 9/11 in the background and not become overwhelmed. Beard took inspiration from his own family life and stepdaughter.^{[source needed]}

== Plot ==
The story begins with 15-year-old Tess DeNunzio who is remembering how her family named her sister. Tess gives insight about her family in the first chapter. The reader learns that Tess has two half sisters and David is her stepfather. Her biological father is a mess. Tess talks about how her relationship with David is very different from her two sisters. By the third chapter, it is revealed that something terrible happened to her sister Zoe almost a year previous. She talks a lot about how the family has been coping. The family attends therapy and tries to get through the death of Zoe, but things have been hard. Tess's mom has become very depressed and was once the leader of the house, but now David and Tess do everything around the house. Tess learns that her mother might have been sleeping with Justin, a young man who works at the store that is down the street from their house. After this event, Tess decides to move in with her biological father. She starts to adapt to her new living arrangements and has a hard time knowing she left her sister Em, who is much younger than her. She goes to see her at school and promises to see her every week. Tess has a moment with the boy next door, Jimmy Freeze, where she listens to the music he is playing. After this moment, she starts to see him around more. She finally talks to him one day while she is sitting on her porch and offers him a beer but his dad refuses to let her give him it. Her dad then warns her to stay away from him. One day when she is sitting outside on the porch, a man named Travis approaches her. Travis claims to be a friend of her father. Travis gives her money to give to her dad, which Tess finds weird. He asks her if she has ever had some of the "product" but Tess did not understand. Travis then asks her if she would like to smoke weed but Tess denies it. After Travis leaves, Tess confronts her dad about him selling weed. After their encounter, Tess starts hanging out with Jimmy Freeze without telling her dad. One night, Jimmy sneaks into Tess's window and they smoke weed together. It is now summer time and Tess gets a job at boardwalk working at a lemonade stand. Jimmy and Tess start hanging out more, with much of their time consisting of smoking and kissing. David asks Tess to start calling her mother again and their relationship improves. On Tess's sixteenth birthday, she wakes up to find out her dad and Jimmy are in jail for selling weed. Tess is home with her dog when her dad comes home from jail. Her dog runs into the street and her father hits the dog. Her dad brings the dog to the veterinarian while Jimmy stays with her. This event triggers her memory of what happened to Zoe. She tells the story about how she was supposed to be watching Zoe outside but she ran inside to watch the news of 9/11 when her sister ran into the street and was killed by a car. Her dad returns hours later and reassures Tess that her dog is going to be fine. When she goes to bed that night, she wakes up and forces her dad to bring her home to get a picture of Zoe. When she goes inside, she realizes she needs to stay. In the final chapter, Tess talks about how she is coping. She continues to see Jimmy, and things seem to be improving.^{[entire section needs improving]}

== Themes ==
Tess uses the letters to work through some deep issues that surfaced from the death of Zoe. Some of the key themes have been going on before Zoe's death. By writing to Zoe, Tess eventually has closure and accepts her sister's death. One theme is conflict. Tess has conflicts between Zoe's death and 9/11, confusing family relationships; fate, guilt, escape and holding on.

There are many conflicts that go on in the novel. The first major one is the tragedy of 9/11 and Zoe's death. Zoe happened to die on 9/11 but not from the terrorist attacks. This issue is something that the main character Tess often brings up. Another opposite conflict that Tess often compares is David and her dad Nick. She constantly brings up the differences between them. David is well put together and accomplished in his life. On the other hand, Tess's dad, Nick does not do much at all. They both treat her differently and in different manners. She is constantly comparing them to each other. In addition, she brings up the biological divide between her and her sisters. This causes constant internal conflict for Tess because she is treated differently.

The many other themes of the books are fate, guilt, escaping and not being able to move on. The theme of fate is brought up a lot in this novel. Tess always feeling guilt is a theme that dominates most of the novel. The reader does not find out what happens to Zoe until the end but guilt is an underlying theme for Tess. She feels guilty not only for Zoe's death but also for leaving her other sister Emily home while she lives at her father's house. Another theme of the book is escaping. Tess escapes from her reality by moving in with her biological father. She could not handle what was going on at home between her mother, Zoe and her own emotions to stay there. Tess also escapes with drugs. She experiments with marijuana with the next-door neighbor, Jimmy Freeze. When she uses marijuana, it is like everything stops for her. Although the book span is over a year, all the characters are not able to move on from the death of Zoe.

== Publication and reviews ==
"Dear Zoe" was first published in 2005 by Penguin. "Dear Zoe" were originally written and marketed for adults but after appearing on the American Library Association’s list, it became a novel for young adults. The novel has had a lot of positive reception and reviews. Booklist named it one of the Ten Best First Novels of the Year. The School Library Journal named it one of the "Best Books of 2005" in the category of "Best Adult Books for High School Students". "Dear Zoe" has great reviews from notable publishers and websites like the BookList, The Washington Post, Entertainment Weekly, and Publishers Weekly. Many schools now read "Dear Zoe" because it deals with a loss of a family member. It is a coming of age novel where students can identify easily with Tess and her experiences not only with death but growing up in general.

== Film adaptation ==
In November 2019, The Hollywood Reporter reported that a film adaptation was in development, directed by Gren Wells and starring Sadie Sink, Theo Rossi, Jessica Capshaw, Justin Bartha and Vivien Lyra Blair. The filming began in October 2019 in Pittsburgh, Pennsylvania and concluded in November 2019.
