= Vivien Lyra Blair =

American child actress (born 2012)

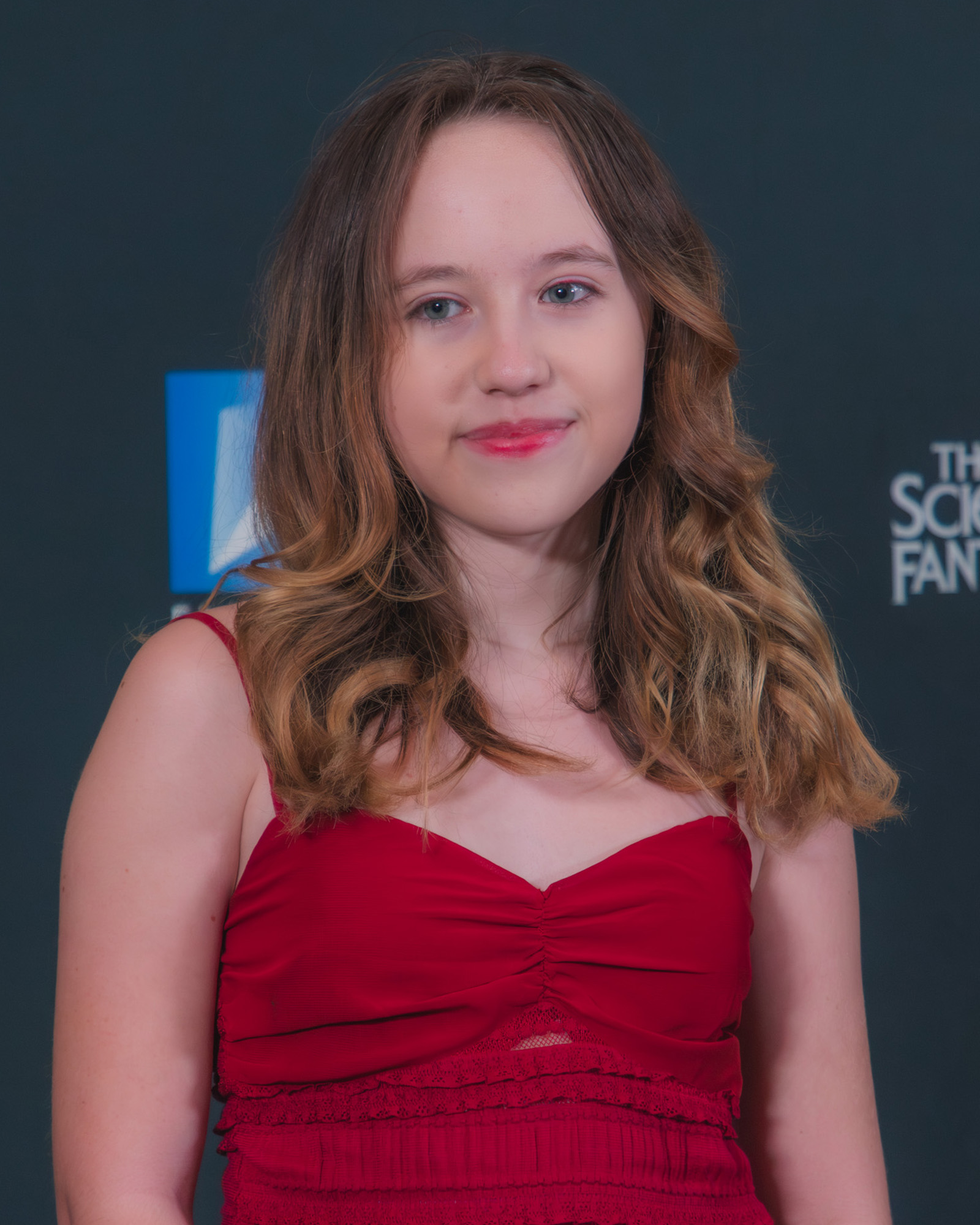
- Blair in 2026
- Born: June 4, 2012 (age 14)
- Occupation: Actress
- Years active: 2017–present

Vivien Lyra Blair (born June 4, 2012) is an American child actress. She made her debut in Band Aid (2017) and rose to prominence for her role as Girl in Bird Box (2018). Blair garnered further recognition for her appearances in video game Telling Lies (2019) and superhero film We Can Be Heroes (2020). In 2022, she received critical praise for her portrayal of a young Leia Organa in the streaming series Obi-Wan Kenobi. She later had a supporting role in the horror film The Boogeyman (2023).

== Early life ==
Vivien Lyra Blair was born on June 4, 2012. Her parents are musicians. Blair has been vegetarian since she was born. She has practiced Taekwondo since the age of five. In 2019, at six years old, Blair became the youngest spokesperson for PETA.

== Career ==
Blair's first onscreen role was in the 2017 film Band Aid, and she subsequently appeared in the television miniseries Waco in 2018. She rose to prominence at the age of five after starring in the film Bird Box. Blair portrays Girl, who–along with her mother and brother—is blindfolded as protection from entities that cause people to die once they have been seen. Blair spent the majority of the film blindfolded. In 2019, she appeared in the video game Telling Lies, in which The Guardian considered her "[a]n unexpected joy ... with adorable confidence". Blair also starred as Guppy in the superhero film We Can Be Heroes (2020), the sequel to The Adventures of Sharkboy and Lavagirl in 3-D (2005). She undertook all her own stunts. While the film itself received mixed reviews, The Daily Telegraph praised Blair's performance as "very funny" and "just absurd ... the effects team simply aren't needed when she's doing her thing".

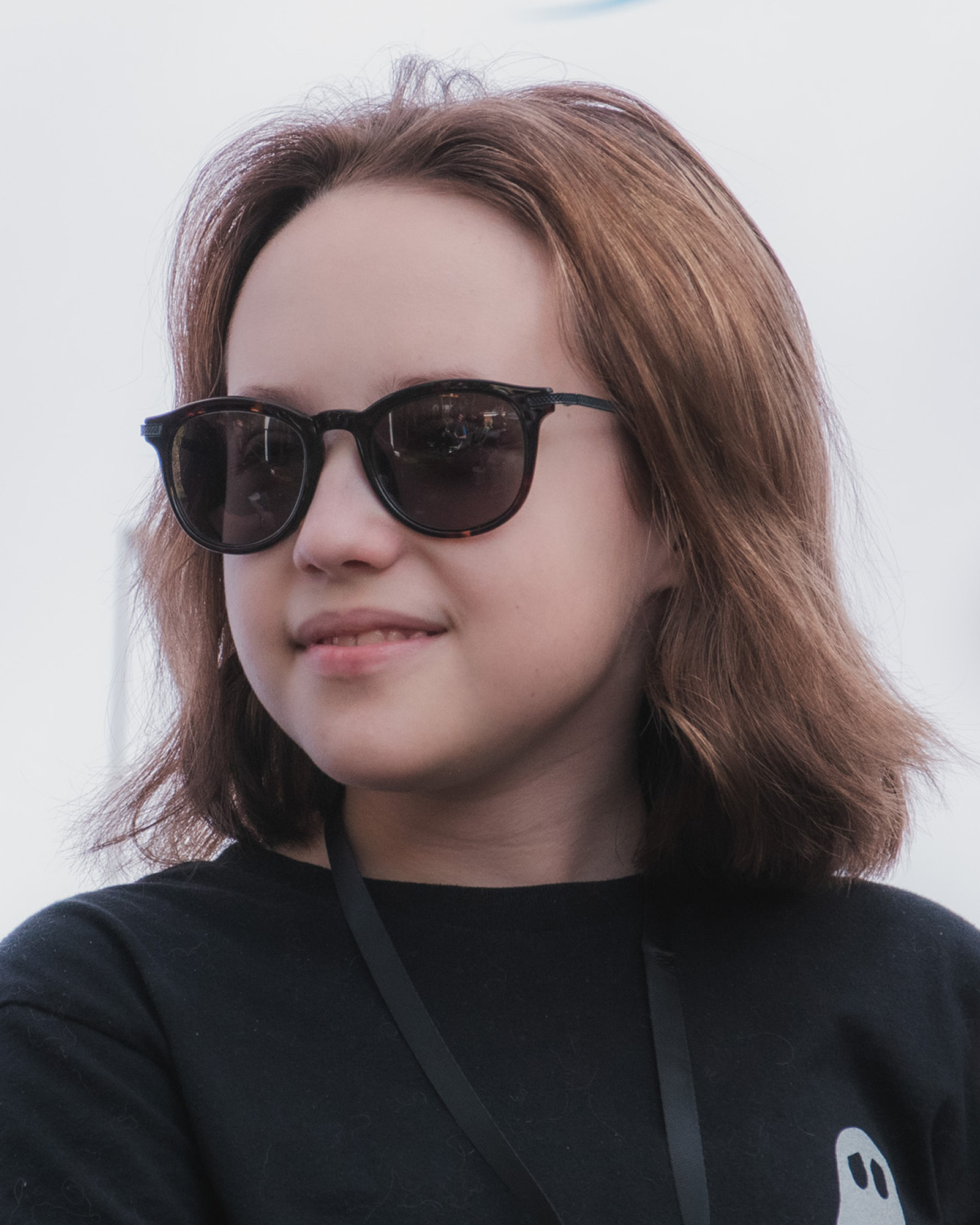
Blair in 2025

In 2022, Blair portrayed Leia Organa in the Star Wars streaming show Obi-Wan Kenobi. Of Blair's casting, series writer Joby Harold stated the team needed an actor who would embody a young Carrie Fisher's (Note: Fisher portrayed the character in the franchise's original film trilogy.) voice and spirit: "[we need] [s]omebody who feels spirited. They don't feel precocious. They don't feel like they are speaking as an adult writing for a kid, but you feel the spirit of what Carrie Fisher built." Harold found Blair to be "an amazing little actor" who miraculously captured that spirit, particularly in her scenes with co-star Ewan McGregor. Blair was praised for her portrayal of the character's strength, wit, and intelligence; NPR commented that she "practically channels Carrie Fisher's subversive, wisecracking spirit". In a more mixed review of her performance, Nick Schager of The Daily Beast thought Blair's line deliveries were "not ... consistently great" but considered her adequate for the role. Blair's performance was nominated for a Saturn Award for Best Performance by a Younger Actor in a Streaming Television Series.

Blair played Emily Gradstone in the film drama Dear Zoe, which is based on the eponymous young-adult novel by Philip Beard. It was released on November 4, 2022, to mixed reviews. In July of that year, Blair joined the cast of the horror film The Boogeyman (2023), an adaptation of Stephen King's eponymous short story. She portrayed Sawyer, a young girl whose family is terrorized by a cryptic monster. She was hesitant to take the role, not wanting to portray "another character that had to be saved". After reading the script, she reconsidered, however, seeing that Sawyer was "so much more than that". Blair found it challenging to portray her character's fear, the emotion she connected with the least as an actress. Several critics lauded her performance; The Hollywood Reporter stated: "Blair is so convincingly terrified throughout that you hope that child services monitored the production closely". For her role, she garnered a Saturn Award nomination for Best Younger Performer in a Film.

== Filmography ==
=== Film ===
Key
†	Denotes films that have not yet been released

Year	Title	Role	Notes	Ref.
2017	Band Aid	Isis		
2018	Bird Box	Girl / Olympia		
2020	We Can Be Heroes	Guppy	Credited as Vivien Blair	
2021	The Guilty	Abby	Voice	
2022	Dear Zoe	Emily Gladstone		
2023	The Boogeyman	Sawyer Harper		
2023	Heritage Day	Evie	Short film	
2024	Goodrich	Billie		
TBA	MattBeth †	Grace	Post-production	

=== Television ===
Vivien Lyra Blair's television roles
Year	Title	Role	Notes	Ref.
2018	Waco	Serenity Jones	Miniseries, 6 episodes	
2019	Station 19	Penny	Episode: "The Dark Knight"	
2020	Indebted	Hazel Klein	3 episodes	
2021	Mr. Corman	Sara	2 episodes	
2022	The First Lady	Young Eleanor Roosevelt	Episode: "That White House"	
2022	Obi-Wan Kenobi	Leia Organa	Miniseries, 6 episodes	
2023	Fatal Attraction	Young Ellen Gallagher	7 episodes	

=== Video games ===
Vivien Lyra Blair's video game roles
Year	Title	Role	Notes	Ref.
2019	Telling Lies	Alba	Credited as Vivien Blair	

== Awards and nominations ==
Vivien Lyra Blair's awards and nominations
Year	Award	Category	Nominated work	Result	Ref.
2022	Saturn Award	Best Performance by a Younger Actor in a Streaming Television Series	Obi-Wan Kenobi	Nominated	
2023	Saturn Awards	Best Younger Performer in a Film	The Boogeyman	Nominated	
