= Authors Cricket Club =

- Team: Authors XI

Personnel
- Captain: Charlie Campbell; Nicholas Hogg (Vice captain)

Team information
- Established: 1892

History
- Notable players: Arthur Conan Doyle; P. G. Wodehouse; J. M. Barrie; A. A. Milne; Edmund Blunden; Alec Waugh
- Official website: The Authors XI

The Authors Cricket Club is a wandering amateur English cricket club founded in 1899 and revived most recently in 2012. Prominent British writers including Arthur Conan Doyle, P. G. Wodehouse, A. A. Milne, E. W. Hornung and J. M. Barrie have been featured as players on the club team, the Authors XI.

== Original team (1899–1912) ==
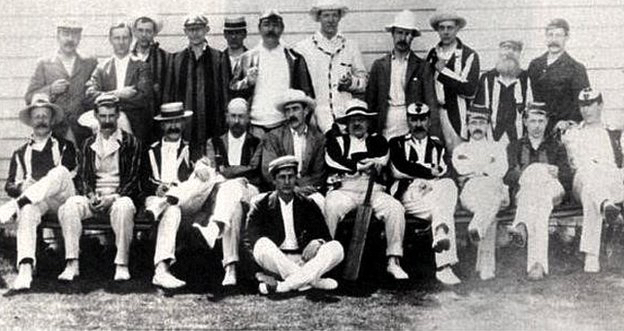
Authors v Artists, May 1903. Authors in back row, left to right: E. W. Hornung (1st), E. V. Lucas (2nd), P. G. Wodehouse (3rd), J. C. Snaith (4th), A. C. Doyle (6th), H. V. Hesketh-Prichard (7th), A. Kinross (furthest right). Front row: S. F. Bullock (2nd from left), J. M. Barrie (3rd from right), G. C. Ives (2nd from right), A. E. W. Mason (sitting on ground).

The original Authors Cricket Club was an offshoot of J.M. Barrie's Allahakbarries team. It also drew some of its membership from the Authors' Club, which had been founded in 1891 as a place for British authors to gather and talk. Sherlock Holmes author Arthur Conan Doyle, an excellent cricketer who would go on to play ten first-class matches for the Marylebone Cricket Club in 1903, was the team captain. The bat that Doyle used when he made 101 not out in a game for the Authors' Club vs. the Press in 1896 is still on display at the MCC Museum at Lord's Cricket Ground. This match, predating the 1899 establishment of the 'real' Authors XI, brought together several of the writers who would found the team three years later.

Doyle was joined by other writers including Winnie the Pooh creator A. A. Milne, reputed to be the best fielder on the team, and Jeeves author P. G. Wodehouse, who was regarded as a decent player. Peter Pan author J. M. Barrie, however, was not, despite his great enthusiasm for the game. The Authors and Barrie's Allahakbarries existed side-by-side for a number of years, with Doyle, Milne and Wodehouse among the players who featured for both teams.

Some of the other writers who played for the team were E. W. Hornung (the team secretary), E. V. Lucas, John Snaith, H. V. Hesketh-Prichard, Albert Kinross, Shan Bullock, George Cecil Ives, and A. E. W. Mason (all pictured left, along with Doyle, Wodehouse, and Barrie). Other players included Gordon Guggisberg, Hugh de Sélincourt, E. Temple Thurston, and Cecil Headlam.

The original Authors XI played their last game in 1912. Most of the team failed to reassemble after World War I ended in 1918, both due to the advancing ages of the players and because many of them found that their appetite for games had been diminished by the war.

== 20th-century revivals ==
The Authors Cricket Club has been regularly revived since the original team disbanded. There were revivals with some of the original personnel in the 1920s (including E. W. Hornung and John Snaith) which lasted until 1968. There was also an unconnected team for a brief period in the 1980s.

Poet Edmund Blunden, a fanatical (although untalented) cricketer who celebrated his love of the sport in 1944's Cricket Country, captained a version of the Authors in the 1940s. Among those who joined him on the team were novelists Alec Waugh, John Moore and Thomas Armstrong, as well as Test cricket legends Len Hutton, Douglas Jardine and Denis Compton.

== 2012–present team ==
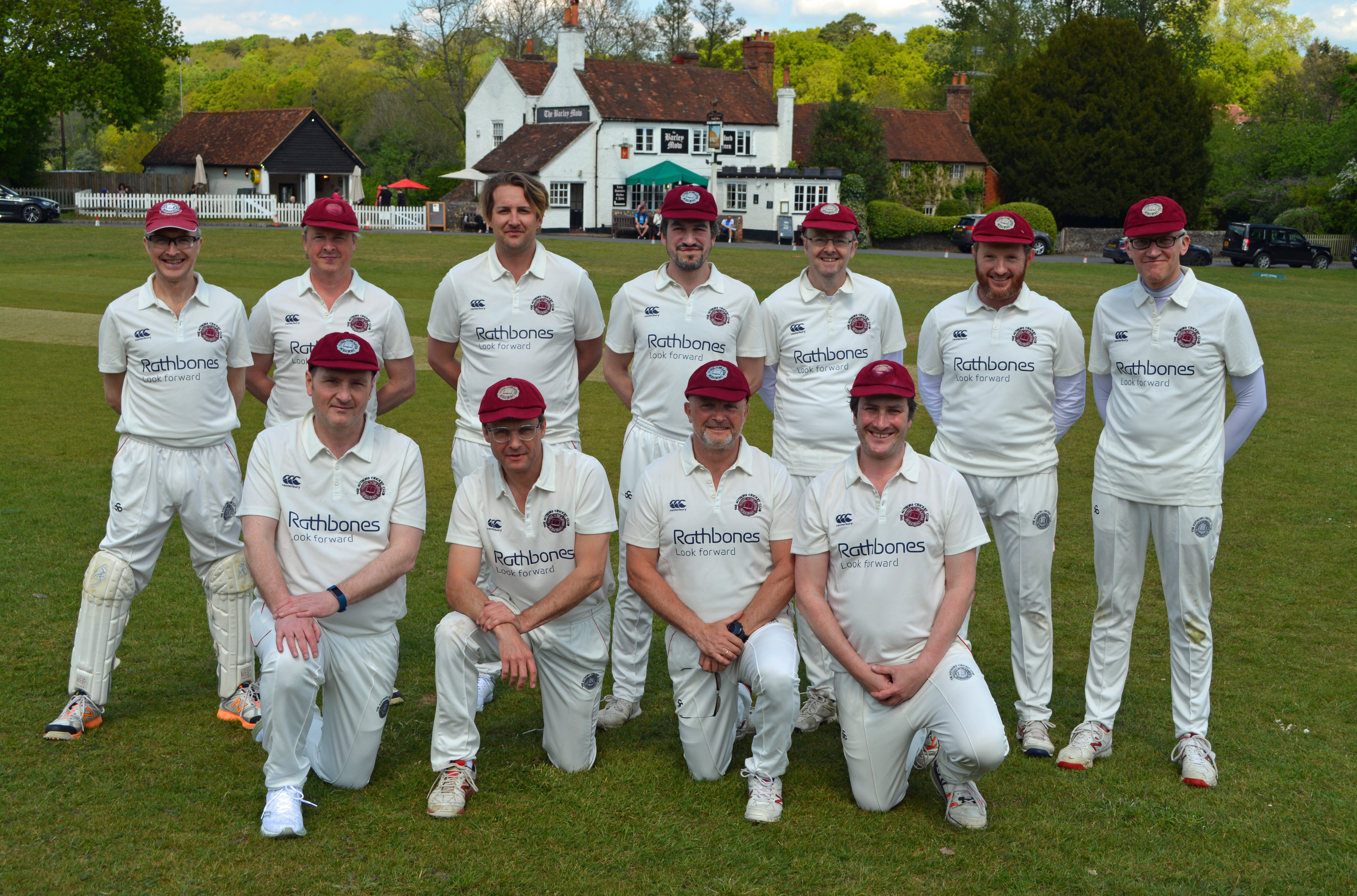
The Authors XI before a match on Tilford Green in May 2019. Back row, left to right: William Fiennes, Matt Thacker, Chris Hemmings, Charlie Campbell, Jon Hotten, Nicholas Hogg, Tom Holland. Front row, left to right: Anthony McGowan, Richard Beard, Tim Beard, Ben Falk

In 2012, 100 years after the original team last played, literary agent Charlie Campbell and novelist Nicholas Hogg announced they were starting the Authors XI anew. Campbell serves as captain and Hogg as vice-captain of the revived team.

The team adopted as its motto the phrase "Praeter ingenium nihil" (Latin meaning "nothing except intelligence"). This is a reference to a remark Australian cricketer Kim Hughes made dismissing England's Mike Brearley when they captained opposing Ashes teams in 1981: "He had nothing going for him except that he was intelligent."

=== Players ===
Writers who joined the revived team included novelists Sebastian Faulks, Richard Beard, Mirza Waheed, and Alex Preston, historical non-fiction writers Tom Holland, James Holland, Matthew Parker and Peter Frankopan, memoirist William Fiennes, young adult novelists Anthony McGowan and Joe Craig, journalists Amol Rajan and Chris Hemmings, sportswriters Jonathan Wilson and Jon Hotten, science writer Adam Rutherford, poet Tim Beard, biographer Ben Falk and editor Matt Thacker.

Comedian Andy Zaltzman and actor Dan Stevens, best known for his role on the television series Downton Abbey, both played on the team during the 2012–2013 season, as did Ed Smith (a former professional cricketer who played for England). Novelist Kamila Shamsie, the only woman on the team, played during an Authors XI game against the Shepperton Ladies team in the same season.

Tom Holland and Matthew Parker are opening bowlers for the team, while Richard Beard, Anthony McGowan and Matt Thacker open the batting and William Fiennes plays in the position of wicket-keeper.

=== Fixtures and foreign tours ===
The Authors XI play against village cricket clubs in England, as well as against clubs such as the Lords and Commons (made up of members of Parliament), the Actors XI (a team that includes Damian Lewis and Iain Glen), the Royal Household (composed of staff of the British royal family) and the Eton College team.

In 2013, they defeated the national team of Japan, which was then ranked in the top 40 in the world, in London. In September 2019, they won a celebrity match against a Lord's Taverners team that included Andy Caddick, Matthew Hoggard and Gladstone Small, all former Test and One-Day International (ODI) players for England. Caddick was clean bowled by Tom Holland.

In addition to games in England, the Authors XI have traveled to several foreign countries to play cricket. In 2013 and 2015, they went to India, where they played against the Rajasthan Royals as part of the 2013 Jaipur Literature Festival. The team captains rode onto the cricket pitch atop camels and the next day, the Authors made the front page of the world's largest newspaper, The Times of India.

They toured Sri Lanka in 2014 and again in 2016. They donated pitches and kit bags to local schools while there, as well as sponsoring a promising young player. In 2015, they played against the Vatican team in Rome and presented Pope Francis with his own Authors XI cricket cap, and in 2017, they traveled to Reykjavik and played against Iceland's national team in a three-match series, losing 2–1 (but redeemed themselves the following year, defeating Iceland by 20 runs when the latter team came to England).

In 2018 and 2019, they visited the island of Corfu, Greece to take part in the first and second Corfu Literary Festivals, where they participated in literary panel discussions and writing workshops and played cricket against local teams.

=== Book ===
Some of the team members collectively wrote a book about their first season playing together, The Authors XI: A Season of English Cricket from Hackney to Hambledon (Bloomsbury, 2013). Sebastian Faulks wrote the foreword, in which he noted that "Amateur cricketers tend to be vain, anecdotal, passionate, knowledgeable, neurotic and given to fantasy. So do writers. The game is made for the profession."

Eighteen of the Authors XI's 2012-13 players (including historian Thomas Penn and editor Sam Carter) contributed chapters about a particular aspect of the game. Among those with chapters: actor Dan Stevens wrote a chapter ("Edwardian Cricket and Downton Abbey") about filming a cricket game on that television series, Tom Holland wrote in "Youth and Age" about learning to love the game as a boy after at first finding it both tedious and humiliating (as well as about hitting the first six of his life while playing in a 2012 Authors game, a feat he also recounted in a 2013 Financial Times article), and William Fiennes penned a piece on "Cricket and Memory" that ended with him drifting away in a haze as he was stretchered off the field after snapping his collarbone while diving to make a catch. In Anthony McGowan's chapter, titled "Cricket and Class", he noted that he, Nicholas Hogg and Jon Hotten were the only players on the 2012–13 team to have attended state schools: "The Authors CC is crammed to the gills with the quite ludicrously posh… the team is packed with the full range of characters from a Fifties public school story – the hearty, sporty type; the etiolated intellectual; the endearingly modest earl; even an exiled Ruritanian princeling"

Reviewing the book for The Guardian, Peter Wilby called it "a distinguished addition to the game's extensive and eclectic literature". Sir Michael Parkinson wrote a blurb for the book which read "I once said I never met a cricketer I didn't like and this book goes some way to explaining why. A wonderful celebration of the best of games." Journalist Simon Barnes wrote "Most cricket writers are better at cricket than at writing. Reversing this principle is a revelation."

=== Sponsorship and charities ===
Christie's auction house sponsored the Authors XI starting with the 2012-13 season. In 2019, Rathbones investment firm announced that they would be sponsoring the team in connection with their annual Folio Prize literary award.

The team has raised "tens of thousands of pounds" for charities including Chance to Shine, which encourages competitive cricket in state schools and First Story, an organization co-founded by team member William Fiennes which fosters literacy through creative writing in low-income schools. They also raised money for the conservation group Alde and Ore Estuary Trust in 2014.
