= Michael Benedict (disambiguation) =

Michael Les Benedict is an American historian.

Michael Benedict may also refer to:

- Michael Benedict, character in Lost in the Garden
- Mike Benedict, character in 7 Faces of Dr. Lao

== See also ==
- Michael Benedikt (disambiguation)
