= A Little Bit of Heaven (2011 film) =

2011 film directed by Nicole Kassell

- Theatrical release poster
- Directed by: Nicole Kassell
- Written by: Gren Wells
- Produced by: John Davis; Adam Schroeder; Mark Gill; Robert Katz
- Starring: Kate Hudson; Gael García Bernal; Rosemarie DeWitt; Lucy Punch; Romany Malco; Treat Williams; Whoopi Goldberg; Kathy Bates; Suzanne De Passe
- Cinematography: Russell Carpenter
- Edited by: Stephen A. Rotter
- Music by: Heitor Pereira
- Production companies: Davis Entertainment; The Film Department; De Passe Entertainment
- Distributed by: The Weinstein Company
- Release dates: February 4, 2011 (United Kingdom); May 4, 2012 (United States)
- Running time: 107 minutes
- Country: United States
- Language: English
- Budget: $20.6 million
- Box office: $1.1 million

A Little Bit of Heaven (formerly titled Earthbound) is a 2011 American romantic comedy-drama film directed by Nicole Kassell, and starring Kate Hudson and Gael García Bernal.

It was released by The Weinstein Company in the United Kingdom on February 4, 2011, and later in the United States on May 4, 2012. The film was a massive box-office bomb, grossing $1.1 million against its $20.6 million budget, and was heavily panned by critics.

== Plot ==
Marley Corbett is a quick-witted, carefree ad executive living in New Orleans, who embraces her easy going attitude, shuns any major responsibilities, and gains support and strength from a close circle of friends. She also enjoys casual dating, refusing to fall in love.

Marley's close friend Sarah notices that she looks drained. After an appointment, Marley is told by Dr. Julian Goldstein that she has terminal cancer. He is deeply impressed by the way she accepts the news with humour and dignity. While under anesthetic, God appears to Marley in heaven and gives her three wishes. She chooses to fly, to win a million dollars (not tax free), and a third that is later revealed.

Marley must now break the news to her friends and parents (who are divorced and haven't spoken in years). Her mother is persistent and overbearing, and instantly begins to smother Marley by visiting too often and making her meals to keep her strength up. Marley's father is the opposite; distant and reserved, and doesn't seem bothered with reconnecting with her in the time she has left.

While driving through town one morning, Marley and Sarah take part in a radio call game where the 97th caller wins a prize. They get through and Marley is told she's won flying lessons—her first wish granted. It is revealed that her other friend Renee is pregnant with her second child. This makes Marley question her life of never settling down.

As the weeks go by, Marley's health deteriorates and she visits her doctor Julian more and more. One night, they see each other at a band night at their local bar and spend the rest of the night on a date. They start to develop feelings for one another.

Upon Marley sharing news of her cancer diagnosis with her boss, he inquires about her life insurance plans. The company has a policy allowing individuals with life-threatening illnesses to cash out and receive an instant payment of one million dollars (or $500,000 after tax)—constituting her second wish.

Marley's friend and neighbor Peter, noticing she is getting worse, hires a little person stripper, to meet with Marley at her apartment. Marley denies the stripper and explains her sickness to him, then decides to let him stay. As they hang out and talk about her cancer, he tells her that he has died before. He explains that dying was like floating and that he never wanted to leave. This helps Marley come to terms with her illness and death.

After another date, Marley and Julian sleep together and begin a relationship. However, the realization they won't have a future together causes her to flee quickly one morning before he wakes. That afternoon, they argue and Marley breaks it off. Envious of her friends who are all going through positive life changes, she becomes distant.

After a bike accident, Marley visits heaven again. God makes her realize that she needs to cherish what she has while she can and, for the first time, Marley admits to being in love. Later that day, she visits Julian to rekindle their relationship, apologizes to the friends she has pushed away and makes peace with her father.

At home over the following weeks, Marley can only lie in bed, and starts focusing on all of the things she is going to miss. She writes cards for future special occasions she won't be around for and letters to her loved ones, giving them to her mother to give out at the right times.

One morning, as Marley and Sarah sit in the park, Marley confesses that she is no longer afraid to die, while Sarah is terrified of life without her. Marley drifts off and Sarah is unable to wake her, so she calls an ambulance. Knowing it's almost time, Marley is visited by everyone in the hospital who stay at her side until the end (except for Renee, who is in labor).

Julian comes in time to say goodbye and, at that final moment, Marley realizes her third wish was to fall in love. The film ends with Marley's funeral, a colorful celebration of life with all of her friends and family.

== Cast ==
- Kate Hudson as Marley Corbett
- Gael García Bernal as Julian Goldstein
- Kathy Bates as Beverly Corbett
- Lucy Punch as Sarah Walker
- Romany Malco as Peter Cooper
- Rosemarie DeWitt as Renee Blair
- Whoopi Goldberg as God
- Treat Williams as Jack Corbett
- Steven Weber as Rob Randolf
- Peter Dinklage as Vinnie
- Alan Dale as Dr. Sanders

== Reception ==
A Little Bit of Heaven was heavily panned by many critics. On Rotten Tomatoes, the film holds an approval rating of 4% based on 53 reviews, with an average rating of 3.1/10. The site's critics consensus reads: "A Little Bit of Heaven subjects viewers to a whole bunch of schmaltz - and strands Kate Hudson and Gael García Bernal in a fatally misguided film." On Metacritic the film has a weighted average score of 14 out of 100, based on 20 critics, indicating "overwhelming dislike".
