= Vincent Wants to Sea =

2010 film by Ralf Huettner

- Film poster
- German: Vincent will Meer
- Directed by: Ralf Huettner
- Screenplay by: Florian David Fitz
- Produced by: Viola Jäger; Harald Kügler
- Starring: Florian David Fitz; Karoline Herfurth
- Cinematography: Andrew Berger
- Edited by: Kai Schroeter
- Music by: Stevie B-Zet; Ralf Hildenbeutel
- Production companies: Corinth Films; Beta Cinema; Olga Film Productions
- Release date: 22 April 2010
- Running time: 96 minutes
- Country: Germany
- Language: German
- Box office: $7,851,439

Vincent Wants to Sea (German: Vincent will Meer, lit. 'Vincent wants sea') is a 2010 German drama film directed by Ralf Huettner. An American remake called The Road Within was released in 2014.

== Plot ==
Vincent, a 27-year-old man with Tourette's syndrome, is institutionalized by his politician father, who does not seem to understand Vincent and his condition, after his mother's death. Vincent soon meets his roommate Alexander, who has obsessive–compulsive disorder, and another fellow patient, Marie who suffers with anorexia. Marie and Vincent get along and decide to leave the facility unsupervised, in a stolen car belonging to their psychiatrist, Dr. Rose. So that Alexander will not notify Dr. Rose about what they have done, they force him to join them on their road trip to fulfill Vincent's wish of going to the sea in Italy, where Vincent's parents vacationed for their honeymoon, to spread his mother's ashes. Dr. Rose, the owner of the stolen car, accompanies Vincent's father in hopes to find the three missing patients. Over the course of the trip, Vincent and Marie develop a relationship and Vincent's father realizes how badly he's been treating his son.

When Vincent, Alexander, and Marie arrive at the sea, Marie promptly collapses from heart failure caused by her untreated anorexia. Vincent and Alexander conclude that the trip was a suicide attempt, as she was the one who originally stole the car and had the idea of leaving. Dr. Rose and Vincent's father take Alexander and Vincent home while Marie remains hospitalized. On the way back, Vincent decides to return his mother's ashes to his father and goes back to the city where Marie is in the hospital; Alexander accompanies him.

== Cast ==
- Florian David Fitz as Vincent
- Karoline Herfurth as Marie
- Heino Ferch as Robert
- Katharina Müller-Elmau as Dr. Rose
- Johannes Allmayer as Alexander
- Karen Thaler Monica
- Tim Seyfi Carabinieri
- Christopher Zrenner Gas station attendant 1
- Butz Ultrich Buse Gas station attendant 2

== Production ==
Vincent Wants to Sea is based on the screenplay written by lead actor Florian David Fitz. Fitz first witnessed a teacher afflicted with Tourette's Syndrome while studying drama at the Boston Conservatory. Fitz came up with the idea of this film after seeing a TV report covering a man with Tourette's syndrome, Christian Hempel. Fitz says that he was impressed by the positive attitude Hempel displayed towards his illness. Fitz asked himself: "How about writing a story about someone who has to grow up under these difficult circumstances?"

Vincent Wants to Sea was created during Fitz's time at the Munich screenplay workshop, which he applied to in 2008 in hopes of writing something that he might be able to star in. Viola Jäger and Harald Kügler from Olga-Film in Munich were recruited to produce the comedy. The two suggested Ralf Huettner to be the director. Ralf Huettner initially had to cancel due to other projects, which soon fell apart due to disagreements. Therefore, Huettner was available to work on Vincent Wants to Sea.

It was not an immediate thought for the screenplay writer, Fitz, to also play the lead role as he had never done something like this before. The director, producer and Fitz quickly agreed he would be a good fit. Karoline Herfurth was asked to play the lead female role, who has anorexia. Herfurth's appearance in the movie was achieved with makeup, but in nude scenes, Herfurth was replaced with a body double, someone who actually suffered from anorexia. Both Heino Ferch and Katharina Müller-Elmau previously worked with Olga Films and were cast for the roles Robert and Dr. Rose. There was only a casting for the role of Alexander, a man who has extreme obsessive–compulsive disorder (OCD). Johannes Allmayer was shortly cast for this role.

Filming for this production took place from July 28, 2009, through September 15, 2009. It took place in multiple areas starting in Munich, Berchtesgaden and in the Allgäu, including the municipality of Oberstdorf. In Mangfalltal, scenes were shot in districts of Bruckmühl. Filming continued in Italy in the regions of Friuli-Venezia Giulia, Monfalcone and Trieste. Some scenes playing on Nebelhorn were shot in the original location as well as in the studio. A 360-degree shot showing the three main characters in front of a panorama of the Summit Cross was actually shot in front of a green screen.

Director Ralf Huettner made changes to the script of Vincent Wants to Sea both during shooting as well as post-production.

== Soundtrack ==
Vincent Wants to Sea includes a variety of genres of music such as; electronic, pop, indie and rock, throughout the film. Production includes popular American and German artists, most worked on by Stevie B-Zet and Ralf Hildenbeutel.

Train - Hey Soul Sister

Clooney - Dancing In The Streetlights

Dania König - Citylights

Newton Faulkner - If This Is It

Cargo City - Point Of View

The Script - Breakeven

Revolverheld & Lucky Kids - Spinner

Cargo City - Walk On My Own

Amanda Jenssen - Autopilot

Clueso - Keinen Zentimeter

Maria Mena - Belly Up (Radio Edit)

Cargo City - Hiding Under Blankets

2raumwohnung - Rette Mich Später

Kashmir - Mouthful Of Wasps

Cargo City - Back Up

== Awards ==
Throughout the years of international popularity, Vincent Wants to Sea has received countless of awards in various categories:

Bambi Awards (2010) - Best Actor

61st German Film Awards (2011) - Best Picture and Best Lead Actor

Jupiter Award at German Annual Cinema Awards (2011) - Best German Film and Best Female Actress

Bavarian Film Awards (2011) - Best Screenplay and Audience award

Fresno Film Festival - Best Feature

Cleveland International Film Festival - Best Film

== Legacy ==
The Road Within is a 2014 film written and directed by Gren Wells. This film is an American remake of the 2010 German film, Vincent Wants to Sea. It was written based on the trailer of Vincent Wants to Sea and continues to have the same plot and characters as the original. Starring Robert Sheehan as Vincent, Dev Patel as Alex, Zoë Kravitz as Marie, Robert Patrick as Robert and Kyra Sedgwick as Dr Rose.

== Critical response ==
Vincent Wants to Sea received a lot of comments regarding how the actors portrayed the said disabilities shown throughout this film, specifically Florian David Fitz performance of Tourettes syndrome. Various reporters had generous comments and responses.

Hollywood Report - “Predictability gives way to touching drama…What makes a deeper and more lasting impression is how badly they want to save one another, and that it’s the wanting that matters more than the saving.”

The Washington Post - “The picture’s quiet performances and occasionally surprising moments take it just far enough off the beaten path to make it more than a transparently formulaic feel-good story."

NDR Kultur - “ Vincent Wants to Sea lacks speed and rhythm in all understandable efforts to achieve wit and lightness. As positive as it is to shoot a feature film about a couple of handicapped young people, it is just as deplorable when the work turns out to be quite conservative. Florian David Fitz and Karoline Herfurth as Vincent and Marie alone make the witty, conventional comedy an experience. Their attempt to live a rather crazy relationship alone has the disturbing power that makes Vincent Wants to Sea suitable for cinema."'

Frankfurter Allgemeine Zeitung - "Not particularly inspired, but always somewhat entertaining. Only the jokes about the disabled are sometimes “a bit superficial in Vincent Wants to Sea, an otherwise quiet road movie comedy that fortunately lacks all kitsch of dismay.” For Huettner, the production is “at least a respectable comeback that shows how good he is with actors who can work and gives hope that he will be given a chance in the cinema more often".
