= Michael Benedikt =

Michael Benedikt may refer to:

- Michael Benedikt (urbanist), urban architect and professor at the University of Texas, Austin
- Michael Benedikt (poet) (1935–2007), American poet

== See also ==
- Michael Benedict (disambiguation)
