= Thomas Penn (historian) =

English historian, author and editor

- Born: 1974 (age 51–52)
- Education: Clare College, Cambridge
- Occupations: Author, Editor
- Writing career
- Language: English
- Genre: History
- Notable work: Winter King: The Dawn of Tudor England
- Notable awards: 2012 HW Fisher Prize

Thomas Penn (born 1974) is an English historian, author and editor. He is best known for his 2011 biography of King Henry VII of England, Winter King: The Dawn of Tudor England, for which he won the HW Fisher Best First Biography prize and which was the subject of a 2013 BBC documentary that he presented.

He is also the author of The Brothers York: An English Tragedy, published in October 2019.

== Biography ==
Penn earned his Ph.D. in medieval history from Clare College, Cambridge. In addition to his writing, he is the editorial director of Penguin Press UK.

He played for the Authors XI amateur cricket team, which is composed of British writers, during its first two seasons and he contributed a chapter to the team's book about their first season playing together, The Authors XI: A Season of English Cricket from Hackney to Hambledon (Bloomsbury, 2013).

== Career ==
Penn's first book, Winter King: The Dawn of Tudor England, was published by Penguin Books in 2011 and is an account of the life of King Henry VII of England. Historian Helen Castor reviewed it for The Telegraph, writing: "In broad outline, this is not a new story – but, in Penn's hands, it is a revelation...Penn has pulled off a rare feat: a brilliant and haunting evocation of the Tudor world, with irresistible echoes of the age of fear in which we now live". Reviewing it for The Guardian, Blair Worden wrote: "If Penn's interpretation can sometimes seem slanted, its exposition would be hard to over-praise. The expressive and evocative power of his writing, and the union of scholarship with artistry, are rare in modern historical writing". Penn was awarded the HW Fisher Best First Biography prize by the Biographers' Club in 2012 for Winter King.

In 2013, Penn presented an hour-long television documentary based on his book on BBC Two. It was titled Henry VII: Winter King.

The Brothers York: An English Tragedy, is about Edward IV and his two younger brothers, the Duke of Clarence and Richard III. It was published by Penguin Books in October 2019.

Penn wrote a book about King Edward V as part of the Penguin Monarchs series, titled Edward V: The May King. It is said to have been published in April 2019. However, no copies appear to be available, new or second hand, in 2023, and it is not listed by the publisher.

Penn has also written book reviews for the newspaper The Guardian and the journal London Review of Books.

== Books ==
- Winter King: The Dawn of Tudor England (Simon & Schuster, 2010), ISBN 978-1439191569
- Edward V: The May King (Penguin Monarchs, 2019), ISBN 978-0241185346
- The Brothers York: An English Tragedy (Simon & Schuster, 2019), ISBN 978-1846146909
