= The Boogeyman (2023 film) =

American film by Rob Savage

- Theatrical release poster
- Directed by: Rob Savage
- Screenplay by: Scott Beck Bryan Woods; Mark Heyman
- Story by: Scott Beck; Bryan Woods
- Based on: "The Boogeyman" by Stephen King
- Produced by: Shawn Levy; Dan Levine; Dan Cohen
- Starring: Sophie Thatcher; Chris Messina; Vivien Lyra Blair; David Dastmalchian
- Cinematography: Eli Born
- Edited by: Peter Gvozdas
- Music by: Patrick Jonsson
- Production companies: 20th Century Studios; 21 Laps Entertainment; NeoReel
- Distributed by: 20th Century Studios
- Release date: June 2, 2023
- Running time: 99 minutes
- Country: United States
- Language: English
- Budget: $35 million
- Box office: $82.3 million

The Boogeyman is a 2023 American supernatural horror film directed by Rob Savage from a screenplay by Scott Beck, Bryan Woods, and Mark Heyman. Based on the 1973 short story of the same name by Stephen King, the film follows a family that becomes haunted by the Boogeyman after a troubled man visits and inadvertently brings the creature to them. The ensemble cast includes Sophie Thatcher, Chris Messina, Vivien Lyra Blair, and David Dastmalchian.

An adaptation of King's short story was first announced in June 2018 with Beck and Woods writing the screenplay, but the project was canceled in 2019 due to Disney's acquisition of Fox. However, it was revived in November 2021 with Savage directing the project. Thatcher, Messina, Dastmalchian and the rest of the cast signed in early 2022. Principal photography began in February 2022 in New Orleans. Originally planned to be released on the streaming service Hulu, the Walt Disney Studios eventually opted for a theatrical release first following positive test screenings.

The Boogeyman was theatrically released in the United States by 20th Century Studios on June 2, 2023. The film received mixed reviews from critics and grossed $82 million worldwide.

== Plot ==
Therapist Will Harper is struggling to overcome the death of his wife, who died suddenly in a car crash. His daughters, Sadie and Sawyer, are likewise struggling to deal with their mother's death.

One day, a disturbed man named Lester Billings visits Will's office. Lester explains that his three children, including his youngest daughter Annie, have died, all killed by an evil entity that latched onto his family. A disbelieving Will goes to call the police. Lester slips away and Sadie finds his body hanging in her mother's art closet.

Soon afterwards, Sadie notices a strange mold beginning to form around the house while Sawyer glimpses a sinister creature under her bed. This creature continues to terrorize Sawyer while Sadie suspects the phenomenon is related to Lester's suicide. She visits the Billings' rundown house. Inside, she discovers Rita, the now-unhinged wife of Lester. Rita identifies the creature as "The Boogeyman", the culprit behind her children's deaths. The creature feeds off fear and grief and can mimic voices. The only way to ward it off is by light. Feeling unsafe around Rita, Sadie flees.

During a sleepover with a group of girls from her school, Sadie encounters the Boogeyman and Sawyer is attacked shortly thereafter, ending up hospitalized. Sadie is contacted by Rita, who needs her help to kill the Boogeyman. When Sadie arrives, Rita attacks her, planning to use her as bait for her trap. The Boogeyman survives the trap and kills Rita. Sadie escapes and realizes her family has returned home. At home, she finds Sawyer hiding. The creature has taken Will into the basement.

In the basement, the sisters find the creature feeding off Will. They rescue their father and a chase ensues through the basement. After a struggle, Sadie sets the creature on fire, avenging the Billings family, and the family escapes the burning house.

Some time later, the family have a group session with their therapist Dr. Weller. As they leave, Sadie is called back by Dr. Weller, only to discover she is not there and the closet door is open, suggesting the creature has returned. Dr. Weller appears and asks why Sadie is there. Suspicious, Sadie shuts the closet door.

== Cast ==
- Sophie Thatcher as Sadie Harper
- Vivien Lyra Blair as Sawyer Harper
- Chris Messina as Will Harper
- David Dastmalchian as Lester Billings
- Marin Ireland as Rita Billings
- Madison Hu as Bethany
- LisaGay Hamilton as Dr. Weller
- Michael Bekemeier as The Boogeyman

== Production ==
On June 26, 2018, it was announced that filmmaking partners Scott Beck and Bryan Woods would write the screenplay for a film adaptation of Stephen King's 1973 short story "The Boogeyman", with 21 Laps Entertainment's Shawn Levy, Dan Levine, and Dan Cohen attached to produce for 20th Century Fox. However, in 2019, after the Walt Disney Company's acquisition of 21st Century Fox, the film was canceled, along with other films in development.

In November 2021, the film was revived, and it was reported that Rob Savage would direct from a screenplay by Mark Heyman, based on original drafts by Beck, Woods, and Akela Cooper. In early 2022, Sophie Thatcher, Chris Messina, David Dastmalchian, Marin Ireland, Vivien Lyra Blair, and Madison Hu were added to the cast. Principal photography began in New Orleans in February 2022.

== Release ==
=== Theatrical ===
The Boogeyman was released by 20th Century Studios in the United States on June 2, 2023. It was originally planned to be released on Hulu that same year, but following a positive test screening in December 2022, it was announced that it would instead be released theatrically. According to Savage, "When the movie tested so well, we decided it was time to get Stephen King's input, so we rented out his favorite cinema in Maine." He also stated, "He knows what he doesn't like and if we'd have fucked up his story, he'd have told us. But he sent a lovely almost-essay about how much he enjoyed the movie. And then the next day I wake up and there's an email in my inbox from Stephen King and he said he's still thinking about the movie. He said a few more nice things and the nicest thing that he said was, 'They'd be fucking stupid to release this on streaming and not in cinemas.'" An advanced screening of the film took place at CinemaCon on April 26, 2023, as part of the Walt Disney Studios' presentation of their 2023 release schedule.

=== Home media ===
The Boogeyman was released on digital formats on August 29, 2023, followed by the release of the DVD and Blu-ray on October 10, 2023.

== Reception ==
=== Box office ===
The Boogeyman grossed $43.2 million in the United States and Canada, and $39.1 million in other territories, for a worldwide gross of $82.3 million.

In the United States and Canada, The Boogeyman was released alongside Spider-Man: Across the Spider-Verse, and was projected to gross around $15 million from 3,205 theatres in its opening weekend. The film made $4.8 million on its first day, and went on to debut at $12.4 million in its opening weekend, finishing third behind Spider-Man: Across the Spider-Verse and The Little Mermaid.

=== Critical response ===
On the review aggregator website Rotten Tomatoes, 60% of 198 critics' reviews are positive, with an average rating of 5.9/10. The website's consensus reads: "The Boogeyman might fall short of its terrifying source material, but a spooky atmosphere and some solid performances help keep the chills coming." Metacritic, which uses a weighted average, assigned the film a score of 55 out of 100, based on 37 critics, indicating "mixed or average" reviews. Audiences polled by CinemaScore gave the film an average grade of "B–" on an A+ to F scale, while those polled at PostTrak gave it 2.5 out of 5 stars.

Wendy Ide of The Observer wrote, "It's an effectively spooky horror film but a generic one. Savage's approach is efficient but workmanlike: he makes liberal use of jump scares and thunderous crashes on the score." She gave the film 3/5 stars. Frank Scheck of The Hollywood Reporter said the film "mostly works, thanks to the expertly calibrated atmospherics, a memorable visual style... and the committed performances of a very talented cast." CNN's Brian Lowry wrote, "As is so often the case with these movies, the buildup is generally more terrifying than the payoff, and Savage doesn't scrimp when it comes to jump-at-you scares."

Kevin Maher of The Times gave the film 2/5 stars, saying that it was "90 minutes of dark corridors, plot holes and jump scares, followed by a silly climactic confrontation and some saccharine nonsense in a therapist's office." Jake Wilson of The Age also gave the film 2/5 stars, writing, "We're at a strange moment in horror cinema, when a film that presents as earnestly as this one can't match the complexity and ambiguity of early Stephen King."
