= The Road Within =

- Teaser poster
- Directed by: Gren Wells
- Written by: Gren Wells
- Produced by: Bradley Gallo; Michael Helfant; Robert Stein; Brent Emery; Guy Louthan
- Starring: Robert Sheehan; Dev Patel; Zoë Kravitz; Robert Patrick; Kyra Sedgwick
- Cinematography: Christopher Baffa
- Edited by: Terel Gibson
- Music by: Josh Debney; The Newton Brothers; John Debney (themes)
- Distributed by: Well Go USA Entertainment
- Release dates: June 18, 2014 (Los Angeles Film Festival); April 17, 2015 (United States)
- Country: United States
- Language: English

The Road Within is a 2014 American comedy-drama film written and directed by Gren Wells in her feature directorial debut. The film is a remake of the 2010 German film, Vincent Will Meer. The film premiered at the 2014 Los Angeles Film Festival and was picked up by Well Go USA Entertainment and given a theatrical release in April 2015.

== Plot ==
After his mother's death, Vincent (Robert Sheehan), a teenager with Tourette syndrome, is enrolled in a behavioural facility by his father. While there, he rooms with Alex (Dev Patel), a Briton with obsessive–compulsive disorder, and meets Marie (Zoë Kravitz) who is in recovery for anorexia nervosa.

After a child films Vincent with his cellphone and Vincent attacks him, he and Marie are called into the office of Mia Rose, a doctor, where she chastises them and Marie steals her car keys. When Alex discovers Marie and Vincent running away in the middle of the night, he attempts to warn Rose and is kidnapped by them. The three of them head towards the ocean where Vincent hopes to scatter his mother's ashes. However Vincent does not remember the exact location of the beachside trip he and his mother made years ago. The trio finally settle on Santa Cruz as their destination.

Rose informs Vincent's father, Robert, that his son has gone missing, and rather than allow the police to apprehend them, she and Robert attempt to track them down. Along the way, Marie and Vincent start a relationship with one another.

When they finally reach the ocean, Marie collapses before they can reach the water. Marie is hospitalized and while there, the three are reunited with Rose and Robert. Marie, who is being force-fed and has been restrained, asks Vincent to run away with her, but Vincent refuses. Instead he has a conversation with his father, who apologizes for treating him poorly, and decides to stay in Santa Cruz so he can be near Marie. Rather than leave with Rose, Alex decides to stay with him.

== Cast ==
- Robert Sheehan as Vincent
- Dev Patel as Alex
- Zoë Kravitz as Marie
- Robert Patrick as Robert
- Kyra Sedgwick as Mia Rose

== Development ==
Wells was inspired to remake the movie based only on the trailer for Vincent Wants to Sea. She also stated that she was compelled to make the movie due to her own history of disordered eating.

Kravitz dropped to 90 pounds (41 kg) for the film and explained she had been drawn to the role due to her own struggles with anorexia.

== Reception ==
=== Critical response ===
On review aggregator Rotten Tomatoes, the film has an approval rating of 45% based on 20 reviews, with an average rating of 5.04/10. On Metacritic, the film has a weighted average score of 31 out of 100, based on 6 critics, indicating "generally unfavorable reviews".

The Hollywood Reporter praised all three of the lead actors but criticized the "formulaic nature of the piece." Similarly, Variety had positive words for the "bristling and committed performances by Robert Sheehan, Dev Patel and Zoe Kravitz" while noting that "there remains a nagging tidiness to the whole endeavor that leaves a strained, cloying aftertaste" that kept the movie from truly succeeding.
