= Allahakbarries =

Amateur cricket team from 1887–1913

Allahakbarries was an amateur cricket team captained by author J. M. Barrie, and was active from 1887 to 1913. The team's name was a portmanteau of Barrie's name and the mistaken belief that 'Allah akbar' meant 'Heaven help us' in Arabic (rather than its true meaning: 'God is great'). Notable figures to have featured for the side included Arthur Conan Doyle, P. G. Wodehouse, Jerome K. Jerome, A. A. Milne, E. W. Hornung, Henry Justice Ford, A. E. W. Mason, E. V. Lucas, Maurice Hewlett, Owen Seaman, Bernard Partridge, Augustine Birrell, Paul Du Chaillu, Henry Herbert La Thangue, George Cecil Ives, and George Llewelyn Davies, as well as the son of Alfred Tennyson.

== The team ==
Barrie co-founded the team in 1887 with his friend H.B. Marriott Watson, but in 1894 Marriott Watson eloped with the wife of one of their teammates. As a result of this extramarital scandal, Barrie subsequently erased Marriott Watson's role from all accounts of the team. The team continued until 1905. It was then disbanded, apart from a one-off reunion match in 1913.

Barrie's enthusiasm for the game eclipsed his talent for it; asked to describe his bowling, he replied that after delivering the ball he would go and sit on the turf at mid-off and wait for it to reach the other end which "it sometimes did". The team played for the love of the game, rather than the results it achieved, and Barrie was generous in his praise for his teammates and opposition alike. He praised one teammate's performance by observing that "You scored a good single in the first innings but were not so successful in the second" while he lauded the opposition's effort by pointing out how "You ran up a fine total of 14, and very nearly won". He instructed Bernard Partridge, an illustrator from Punch magazine who was afflicted with a lazy eye, to "Keep your eye on square leg" while bowling, and told square leg, "when Partridge is bowling, keep your eye on him." He forbade his team to practise on an opponent's ground before a match because "this can only give them confidence". The book notes that his most calamitous performance was being clean-bowled by the American actress Mary Anderson in the 1897 Test match against the village of Broadway, in the Cotswolds.

== Legacy ==
By bringing together a number of keen cricket-playing writers, the Allahakbarries established a network of 'literary cricketers' who continued playing cricket together, under various team names, until 1968. One of the most famous literary cricket teams was the Authors Cricket Club (1899-1912), which featured many of the same players.

It has been argued that members of the Allahakbarries used the team as a vehicle of social advancement, cultural status and creative inspiration. In this way, it even influenced the creation of Barrie's Peter Pan and Conan Doyle's Sherlock Holmes.

Barrie wrote a 40-page book on his team, Allahakbarries C.C., which was published privately in 1899. It was reprinted in 1950 with a foreword by Donald Bradman. These rare books are now highly sought by collectors.

Peter Pan's First XI: The Extraordinary Story of J. M. Barrie's Cricket Team, written by Kevin Telfer, was published in 2011.

Writers in Whites: How a group of literary cricketers changed English culture, by Ollie Randall, was published in 2026; the Allahakbarries are a central part of the book.
