= A Sacrifice =

2024 thriller drama film by Jordan Scott

- Film poster
- Directed by: Jordan Scott
- Screenplay by: Jordan Scott
- Based on: Tokyo by Nicholas Hogg
- Produced by: Ridley Scott; Michael Pruss; Jonas Katzenstein; Maximilian Leo; Georgina Pope
- Starring: Eric Bana; Sadie Sink; Sylvia Hoeks
- Cinematography: Julie Kirkwood
- Edited by: Rachel Durance
- Music by: Volker Bertelmann
- Production companies: Scott Free Productions; Augenschein Filmproduktion
- Distributed by: Vertical (United States); SquareOne Entertainment (Germany)
- Release dates: June 28, 2024 (United States); August 1, 2024 (Germany)
- Running time: 94 minutes
- Countries: United States; Germany
- Languages: English; German
- Box office: $130,017

A Sacrifice is a 2024 psychological thriller drama film written and directed by Jordan Scott, and starring Eric Bana, Sadie Sink, and Sylvia Hoeks. A co-production between Germany and United States, the film is an adaptation of Nicholas Hogg's 2015 novel Tokyo.

A Sacrifice had a limited theatrical release in the United States by Vertical Entertainment on 28 June 2024. It had a limited release in Germany under the title Berlin Nobody on 1 August 2024, by SquareOne Entertainment. It received generally poor reviews.

== Plot ==
Ben is an American social psychologist living and working in Berlin in the immediate aftermath of a separation from his wife back in California. Ben teaches at a local college, and studies and writes books about cults and how they work. His daughter, 16-year-old Mazzy, comes to Berlin to live with him for the semester and attend a local English school.

The day that Mazzy is scheduled to arrive, Ben's colleague Max calls him and tells him that a contact of his at the police department is at the crime scene of a cult mass suicide and has given Max and Ben permission to come view it since Max had previously asked to be informed about any such crimes. Max and Ben arrive at a house in the suburbs where a group of people have methodically committed suicide. The police contact, a forensic detective named Nina, tells them that the group took the cyanide pills in shifts, to ensure that everyone could be laid out next to their own belongings. Each corpse also has a small seashell inside their mouths and a black smear on their cheeks. Because he is at the crime scene, Ben texts Mazzy and asks her to take the train to his apartment as he will not make it in time to pick her up.

Mazzy attempts to take the train but becomes confused about where her stop is, so she asks a man around her age for help. The man shows her where to go and introduces himself as Martin. He tells her that he lives near her father's apartment, and they exchange numbers. In the days after Mazzy and Ben reconnect, she starts school and he continues his research, which includes interviews that he conducts with a member of a cult who will only speak to him behind her closed apartment door, and work with Max and Nina. Mazzy also spends time with Martin, getting coffee on one occasion and doing shrooms in the woods on another. One night, Mazzy, Ben, and Nina are all present for dinner at Max's house with his wife and teenage daughter Elsa. Mazzy asks Elsa who Nina is as she suspects that Ben and Nina are romantically involved, but Elsa says she has only heard of Nina as a colleague.

Meanwhile, flashbacks show that Martin lived with his grandmother and was very close with her. In between spending time with her and attending school, he goes to an environmental activist group led by a woman named Hilma. The group participates in various activities such as group therapy and meditation sessions as well as hosting and attending protests in the city. At some point, Martin began bringing a girl around his age, Lotte, to the group meetings with him. One day, Martin gets home and finds that his grandmother has died and is heartbroken as she was the only family he had — previously when Mazzy had asked him about his family he told her that both of his parents died in a car accident when he was very young, and he was raised by his grandmother but that he does not live with her anymore and currently lives alone.

A few days after the mass suicide at the suburban home, another girl is found having committed suicide by drowning herself in a lake with stones in her pockets. Nina and her team are called to the scene, but after inspecting the body Nina tells the police that they do not need to be there, as the girl did not have a shell in her mouth or the black mark on her cheek and was found alone, thus cannot be linked to the mass suicide and is likely just a one off. She and Ben also begin spending time together, and Martin brings Mazzy to a protest with Hilma and the rest of the group. Hilma is very welcoming to Mazzy and gives her the necklace that she is wearing. Mazzy begins listening to Hilma's talks and lectures on her own.

One evening when Mazzy has fallen asleep listening to a talk by Hilma, Nina asks Ben to meet her for a drink, so he leaves a note letting Mazzy know he will be at the bar down the road if she wakes up. Mazzy does wake up and comes to find him, only to see him kissing Nina outside the bar, which greatly upsets her as he had told her he was not seeing anyone. The next morning, Mazzy confronts Ben about Nina and storms out of the house, stating that she will be at Elsa's house. First however, she goes to the center where the group meets in an attempt to find Martin. He is not there, but Hilma comforts Mazzy as she talks about her parents. Mazzy explains that when she was younger she got caught in a rip current at the beach when her father was supposed to be watching her. He froze up when it happened and her mother rushed in to save her; Mazzy worries that this is the true reason for their separation. Hilma does not contradict this idea and instead encourages Mazzy to distance herself from her parents.

Afterwards, Mazzy does go to Elsa's but leaves when Elsa does not want to go out to a club with her. Instead, Mazzy meets up with Larissa, a friend from school. They go to an underground club where they drink and do drugs with strangers. Unbeknownst to them, Martin is also in the club and witnesses a man attempting to pressure Mazzy into dancing with him. Larissa pulls Mazzy away and they leave the club, after which Martin stabs the man with a broken bottle. Intoxicated and vomiting, Mazzy and Larissa decide to sleep in a nearby park as they cannot go home in their current state.

A couple of hours later at dawn, Martin covers Larissa with a blanket and uses her phone to dial emergency services so that someone will come get her, and then brings Mazzy to the center. Meanwhile, after spending the night with Nina, Ben realizes that Max has been trying to call him to let him know that Mazzy is gone and they do not know where she is. Ben and Nina rush to Max's house where they try to get information out of Elsa, but she does not know anything other than that Mazzy had wanted to go to a club. Ben is about to call the police, but Nina convinces him not to, telling him that they will not take it seriously until 24 hours have passed and that she has detective contacts that will be of more help, who she then steps out to call. When she comes back inside, she tells Ben that she got a tip that an unconscious girl was seen being carried into the center, and the two of them rush there where they find Hilma and some of the other group members, but not Martin or Mazzy.

It is then revealed that Nina is part of the same cult as Martin and is completely under Hilma's control. Nina's parents turned her over to Hilma when she was a young teen so that they could commit suicide “for the greater good” of the group. She sought out Ben because of his book about groupthink and the fact that he believes community is an important aspect of humanity and society. Since he has written popular books on the subject and has an online presence, Hilma and Nina believe that he could use his influence to spread their message further and recruit more people. The woman who Ben had been interviewing through the door and the suicide victim from the lake are both revealed to be Lotte, whom Martin had previously recruited to the cause. Everything from Ben being present at the crime scene at the time Mazzy arrived in Berlin to Martin meeting her at the train has been orchestrated by the group. The necklace that Hilma gave Mazzy is also revealed to have been the seashell that the cult members who commit suicide have been found with.

When Martin brought Mazzy to the center after finding her passed out in the park, he, Hilma, and the rest of the group convinced her to “let them help her”, after which they took her down to an underground chamber and began an initiation ritual. However, Mazzy rejected the ritual and begged them to call her father, eventually lashing out at Hilma, who then has her sedated with chloroform. After chastising Martin and telling him he “failed again”, Hilma instructs him to “take her to the lake and await instruction”, which he does. During her confrontation with Ben and Nina, Hilma says something that Lotte had said to him during one of their interviews, which makes him realize her identity and that Mazzy will have been taken to the lake. He rushes out of the center and calls Max, telling him where Mazzy is and to send the police.

Realizing what is about to happen, the remaining group members prepare for a mass suicide. Heartbroken and lost, Martin leaves Mazzy on the lakeshore and drives back to his apartment, where it is revealed he never moved his grandmother's corpse from the living room rug, and lays down next to her taking a cyanide pill. At the center, Hilma chastises Nina the same way that she did Martin, to which Nina responds that she has “always been faithful”. Hilma tells her this is her chance to prove it, and takes away the cyanide pill from her hand. Instead, Nina and the rest of the group members don ceremonial robes, put the seashells in their mouths, and smear a stripe of ash on their faces before dousing themselves in gasoline and striking matches, thus self-immolating and burning down the center. Hilma leaves as this is happening.

At the lakeshore, Mazzy wakes up and still dazed from being drugged, hallucinates that Lotte is in the water beckoning her in, so she wades into the water and allows herself to sink. Ben and the police arrive, and Ben dives into the water, rescuing Mazzy. The two embrace in tears as Martin and the other cult members except for Hilma are shown dying. The final scene of the film shows Elsa having found a video of Hilma online, staring entranced at it the same way that Mazzy originally did.

== Cast ==
- Eric Bana as Ben Monroe
- Sadie Sink as Mazzy Monroe, Ben's daughter
- Sylvia Hoeks as Nina
- Jonas Dassler as Martin
- Sophie Rois as Hilma
- Stephan Kampwirth as Max
- Lara Feith as Lotte

== Production ==
The film, initially titled Berlin Nobody, was co-produced by Ridley Scott and Michael Pruss for Scott Free Productions in conjunction with Cologne-based Augenschein Filmproduktion's Jonas Katzenstein, Maximilian Leo, and Georgina Pope. Executive producers were Jonathan Saubach for Augenschein and Rebecca Feuer for Scott Free.

Kiernan Shipka was initially added to the production alongside Bana in January 2022, but left the project before principal photography began in September 2022. In May 2022, Sylvia Hoeks was added to the cast. In September 2022, Sadie Sink, Jonas Dassler, and Sophie Rois were cast in the film. Stephan Kampwirth and Lara Feith were announced to be part of the cast in May 2024.

Principal photography began in Berlin in September 2022. Filming was wrapped by December 2022.

== Release ==
A Sacrifice is the second film (after The Dive in 2023) under the strategic sales partnership between UK-based Protagonist Pictures and the German distributor Augenschein Sales, with both companies sharing joint sales rights to the film worldwide.

In February 2024, Vertical acquired North American distribution rights to the film (which was subsequently re-titled A Sacrifice in May 2024), releasing it in select theatres on 28 June 2024.

A Sacrifice was released in Germany by SquareOne Entertainment under the title Berlin Nobody on 1 August 2024.

== Reception ==
=== Box office ===
As of 30 August 2024, most of the film's revenue originated from its theatrical release in Russia, where it grossed $61,559 during its opening weekend, and went on to make the total of $122,360 in that territory after 56 days in release.

=== Critical response ===
On the review aggregator website Rotten Tomatoes, 25% of 20 critics' reviews are positive, with an average rating of 4.6/10. Metacritic, which uses a weighted average, assigned the film a score of 44 out of 100, based on five critics, indicating "mixed or average" reviews.

Peter Sobczynski of RogerEbert.com gave the film one out of four stars and wrote, "The first two-thirds of A Sacrifice are a largely leaden affair... it then proceeds to get infinitely worse in its final act as it shifts from tediousness to outright lunacy."
