= Sadie Sink =

American actress (born 2002)

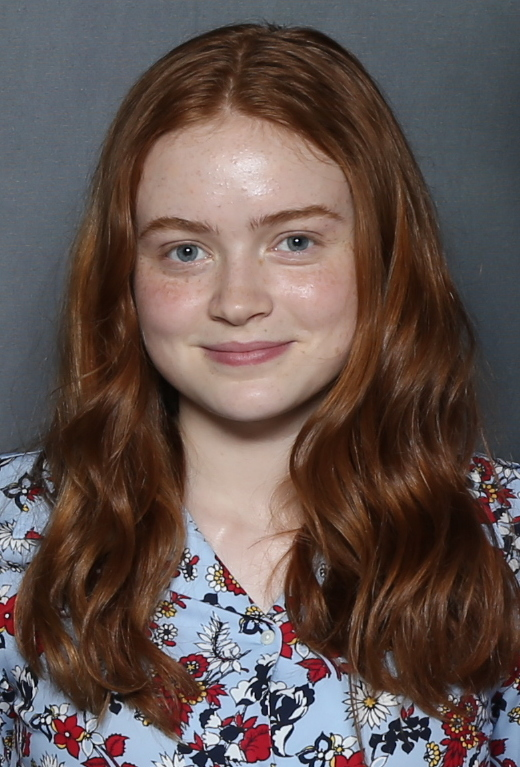
- Sink in 2018
- Born: Sadie Elizabeth Sink; April 16, 2002 (age 24); Brenham, Texas, U.S.
- Occupation: Actress
- Years active: 2011–present

Sadie Elizabeth Sink (born April 16, 2002) is an American actress. She began her career in theater as a child, playing the title role in the musical Annie (2012–2014) and young Elizabeth II in the historical play The Audience (2015) on Broadway. In 2016, she made her film debut in the biographical sports drama Chuck. Sink had her breakthrough portraying Max Mayfield in the Netflix science fiction horror series Stranger Things (2017–2025), for which she received critical praise.

Sink appeared in the horror film trilogy Fear Street in 2021 and starred in Darren Aronofsky's 2022 psychological drama The Whale. She portrays Jean Grey in the Marvel Cinematic Universe (MCU), starting with the film Spider-Man: Brand New Day (2026), and will reprise the role in Avengers: Secret Wars (2027) and the untitled X-Men film (2028). She received a Tony Award nomination for Best Actress in a Play for her performance in the Broadway production of John Proctor Is the Villain (2025), and made her West End debut in Robert Icke's production of Romeo and Juliet in 2026.

== Early life ==
Sadie Elizabeth Sink was born on April 16, 2002, in Brenham, Texas. She is one of five children of Lori and Casey Sink and has three older brothers—Caleb, Spencer, and Mitchell—and a younger sister, Jacey. Although her family was primarily interested in sports, she and Mitchell developed an interest in musical theater. They staged performances at home and watched Broadway productions and Tony Award performances together.

Sink made her stage debut at age seven as an ensemble member in a community-theater production of The Best Christmas Pageant Ever in Brenham. The following year, she played Mary Lennox in an A.D. Players production of The Secret Garden. She later credited the experience with inspiring her to pursue acting professionally. She trained at the Humphreys School of Musical Theatre at Theatre Under the Stars and attended a summer program at the Houston Family Arts Center. In 2012, after she and Mitchell began obtaining professional stage work, their family relocated to New York City to support their careers.

As her acting career developed, Sink alternated between homeschooling, remote study, and public school. She attended public school during eighth grade and part of her first two years of high school before completing her final two years remotely.

== Career ==
=== 2011–2016: Broadway and early screen work ===
Sink began working professionally onstage with Theatre Under the Stars in Houston, playing Susan Waverly in White Christmas in 2011 and the title role in Annie in 2012. Later in 2012, at age ten, she made her Broadway debut in the revival of Annie at the Palace Theatre. She initially served as a standby for Annie and several of the orphan roles. In July 2013, Sink and Taylor Richardson began alternating as Annie and Duffy. Sink remained with the production until it closed in January 2014. She later credited the production's eight-show weekly schedule with developing her discipline as an actor and confirming her desire to pursue acting professionally.

While appearing in Annie, Sink made her television debut in a 2013 episode of the spy drama The Americans. She subsequently guest-starred in the police procedural series Blue Bloods in 2014 and became a series regular as Suzanne Ballard in the 2015 NBC thriller American Odyssey.

In 2015, Sink returned to Broadway as a young Elizabeth II in Peter Morgan's play The Audience, appearing alongside Helen Mirren, who portrayed the adult monarch. Sink described the production as a formative experience, saying that working with Mirren, director Stephen Daldry, and Morgan changed how she viewed acting. She made her feature-film debut as Kimberly Wepner in the biographical sports drama Chuck (2016).

=== 2016–2022: Breakthrough with Stranger Things ===
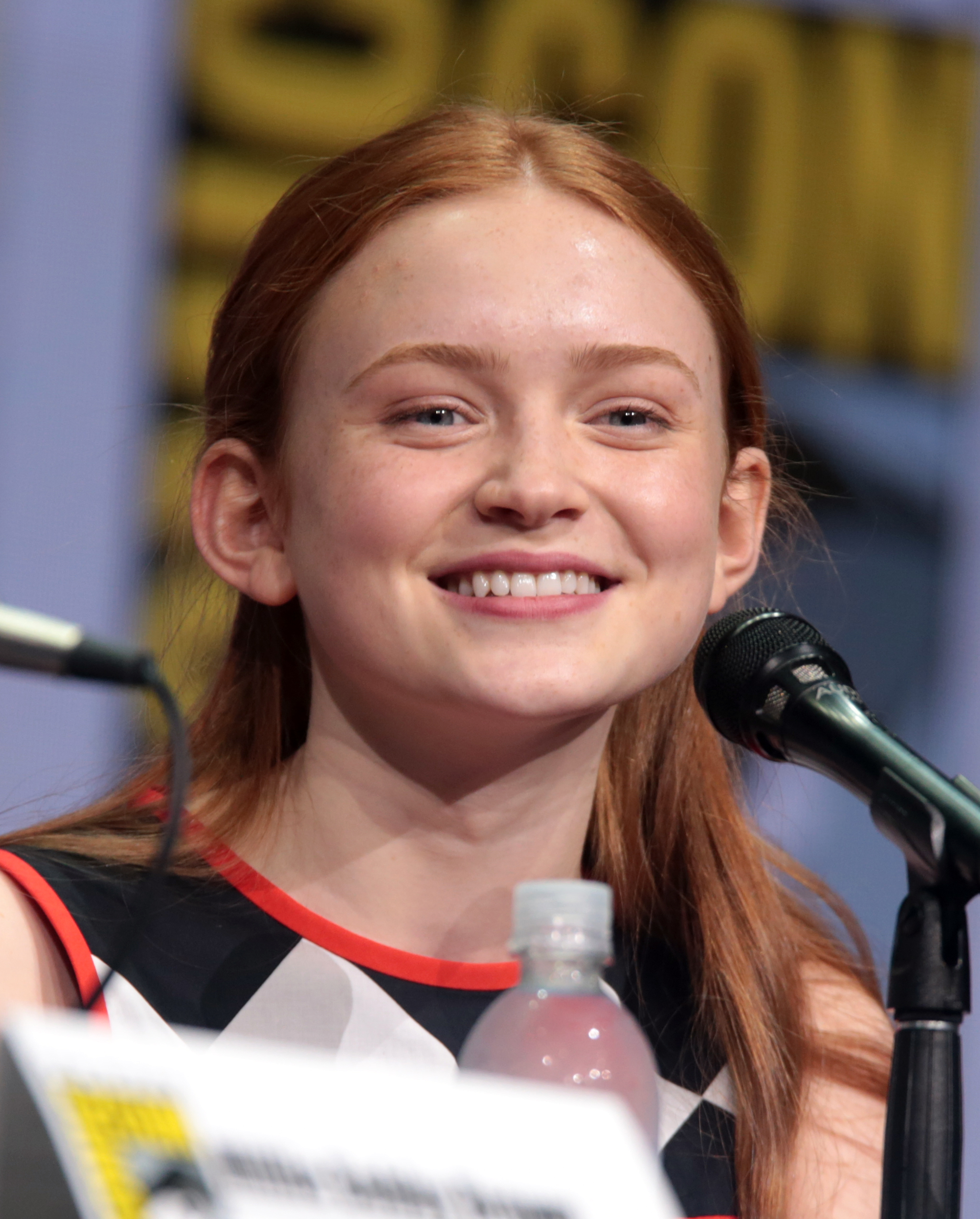
Sink in 2017

In September 2016, Sink auditioned to play Maxine "Max" Mayfield in the second season of Netflix's science fiction drama series Stranger Things. The casting directors deemed the 14-year-old Sink too old for the role, but she "begged and pleaded" for more material to perform for them. She received four callbacks, including a chemistry read with Gaten Matarazzo and Caleb McLaughlin. During the audition process, Sink lied about having rollerblading experience. According to director and writer Matt Duffer, casting Sink was "a bit of a no-brainer" due to her "innocent, child chemistry" with Matarazzo and McLaughlin. After she booked the role, Sink had to learn how to skateboard, an activity she disliked due to falling on her first day of practice. She took three-hour lessons daily for two months. The role became Sink's breakthrough. Critics described her as "spirited", with IGN commenting that she acts "beyond her years and makes a welcomed addition to the cast". Sink, along with her Stranger Things cast members, was nominated for the SAG Award for Outstanding Performance by an Ensemble in a Drama Series.

In film, Sink appeared in The Glass Castle (2017) and Eli (2019). She also reprised her role in Stranger Things's third season, for which she received critical praise. The BBC considered her performance "wonderfully loose and natural", while Variety praised her and co-star Millie Bobby Brown's energy. In 2021, she starred in Fear Street Part Two: 1978, the second installment of The Fear Street Trilogy. Sink portrays Ziggy Berman, an aggressive and tomboyish teenager who has a difficult home life. She said she was drawn to the character's potential for depth. Director Leigh Janiak suggested that Sink watch slasher films, such as Friday the 13th (1980) and Scream (1996), to prepare for the role. She did most of her own stunts in the film. Sink's acting received critical praise; the Los Angeles Times commended her portrayal of Ziggy's emotions, attractions, and loyalties, and RogerEbert.com said that her "intense performance gets a great deal of volume" from a one-dimensional character. In the trilogy's third film, Fear Street Part Three: 1666 (2021), she played Ziggy and Constance.

Sink had a leading role opposite Dylan O'Brien in All Too Well: The Short Film (2021), which was written and directed by American musician Taylor Swift. The singer had been impressed by Sink's onscreen presence and emotivity in Stranger Things. Swift said that had Sink declined her offer, she would not have proceeded with making the film. Sink saw the role as an opportunity to "step out of being a kid on screen" and play a "more rounded and mature" character. The short received critical acclaim. Collider stated that Sink and O'Brien gave "vividly emotional performances" and told "an incredibly moving tale of love, power, gaslighting, and heartache".

For the fourth season of Stranger Things, which was released in two parts on May 27 and July 1, 2022, Sink journaled and did internal reflection to prepare for her character's journey. Critics gave the season positive reviews, with Sink receiving acclaim. Rolling Stone described her performance as "poignant and emotionally raw", stating that she brings "a degree of emotional heft" that balances out the season's more comedic moments. For her performance, Sink won the Hollywood Critics Association Award for Best Supporting Actress in a Streaming Series, Drama, and received a Saturn Award nomination for Performance by a Younger Actor.

=== 2022–2025: The Whale and return to Broadway ===
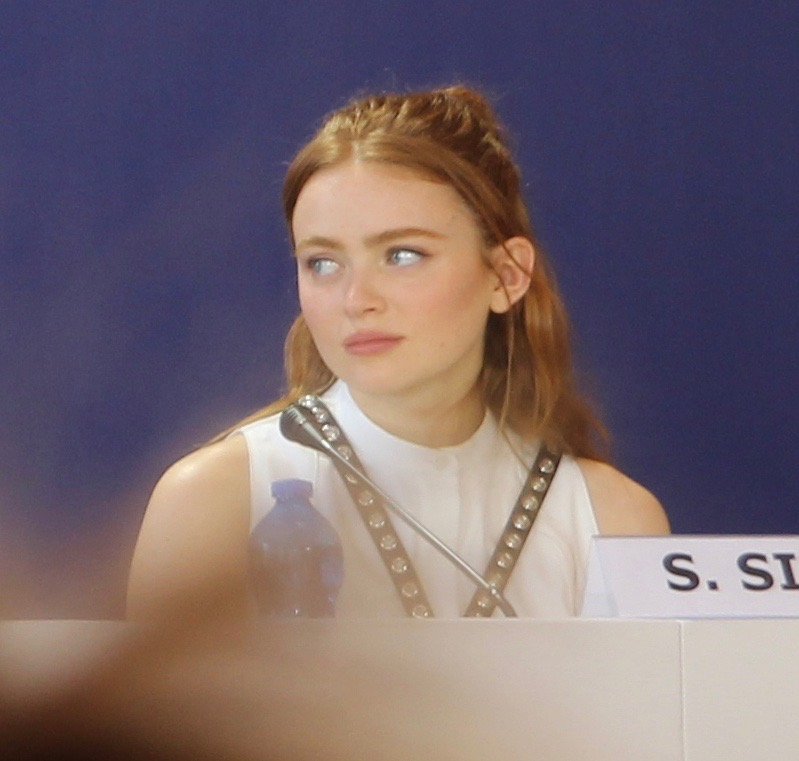
Sadie Sink at the 2022 Venice Film Festival

Sink was cast in the psychological drama The Whale (2022) in February 2021, following a Zoom meeting with director Darren Aronofsky and lead actor Brendan Fraser. She starred as Ellie, the estranged daughter of Fraser's character. Commenting on her role, Sink explained that "I'd just have these moments of, 'Is she actually evil?' And then there would be some days where I was like, 'No, she's good. She's just in so much pain.'" Sink said filming could be "so draining" at times due to the darker subject matter requiring her to "fully shed every layer and be really vulnerable". She stated that the role enhanced her confidence, which she attributed to "stepping out of the child actor role and into ... your adulthood, where you stop seeing yourself as this little puppet that stands on their mark and takes direction".

The Whale premiered on September 4, 2022, at the 79th Venice International Film Festival. Variety's Owen Gleiberman said that Sink "acts with a fire and directness that recalls the young Lindsay Lohan", while the Los Angeles Times's Justin Chang found her emotional intensity "impressive" but felt her role was poorly written. In a more negative review, Sandra Hall, for The Sydney Morning Herald, wrote that her acting "is dialed up to unrelenting obnoxiousness". At the 28th Critics' Choice Awards, Sink received a nomination for Best Young Actor/Actress.

Sink led the drama film Dear Zoe in 2022. That year, she appeared on the annual Forbes 30 Under 30 and Time 100 Next lists. For her profile for Time, Stranger Things co-star Winona Ryder wrote: "[Sink] is this creative acrobat and she's on this balance beam that very few have the courage to walk. [...] As an actor, she knows that we are ultimately in service to the characters and story". Sink starred in the thriller film A Sacrifice (2024), an adaptation of Nicholas Hogg's 2015 novel Tokyo. IndieWire praised her and co-star Eric Bana's performances, stating they "make for a pleasant viewing experience even when the [film's] intellectualism comes up short". Sink also portrayed the titular character in Searchlight Pictures's rock opera film O'Dessa. The film received mixed to negative reviews, but Sink's performance was commended.

She later returned to Broadway, starring in the comedy play John Proctor is the Villain. Opening in April 2025, the play and her performance were met with critical acclaim. Christian Lewis of Variety wrote that Sink "gives a spellbinding performance as a girl who is deeply pained but shielded with thick armor: She's smart but underestimated, and ready to harness her rage against the patriarchy." The role earned her a nomination for the Tony Award for Best Actress in a Play.

=== 2026–present: West End and Marvel Cinematic Universe debuts ===
Sink made her West End theatre debut in March 2026, playing Juliet in Robert Icke's second production of Romeo and Juliet. Sink starred in the Marvel Cinematic Universe film Spider-Man: Brand New Day (2026) as Jean Grey, a role that she will reprise in Avengers: Secret Wars (2027) and the untitled X-Men film (2028). The role had previously been undisclosed and was confirmed upon the film's release, following months of speculation in the media. Sink's performance was praised by multiple film critics, who called it a standout. She will executive-produce the film adaptation of John Proctor Is the Villain and star in Hiro Murai's television adaptation of Jeffrey Eugenides's 2011 novel The Marriage Plot.

== Other ventures ==
In 2018, Sink walked the runway at Paris Fashion Week, making her modeling debut at age 15. She later walked the runway for brands such as Miu Miu and Kate Spade New York. In July 2023, Sink was announced as a global ambassador for Armani Beauty. In March 2025, she fronted a recycled nylon campaign by Prada alongside Benedict Cumberbatch. In September 2026, she joined Calvin Klein's "Feel the Fit" denim campaign.

== Personal life ==
Sink has said that she keeps her personal life private because she believes limited public knowledge about an actor helps audiences separate the performer from their roles.

Sink identifies as a feminist. She became vegetarian at age thirteen after watching the documentary Food, Inc. (2008), and adopted a vegan diet the following year after spending time with her The Glass Castle co-star Woody Harrelson and his family.

== Acting credits ==
Key
†	Denotes films that have not yet been released

=== Film ===
List of Sadie Sink film credits
Year	Title	Role	Notes	Ref.
2016	Chuck	Kimberly Wepner		
2017	The Glass Castle	Young Lori Walls		
2018	Dominion	Narrator	Documentary film	
2019	Eli	Haley		
2021	Fear Street Part Two: 1978	Christine "Ziggy" Berman		
2021	Fear Street Part Three: 1666	Constance / Ziggy Berman		
2021	All Too Well: The Short Film	Her	Short film	
2022	The Whale	Ellie Sarsfield		
2022	Dear Zoe	Tess DeNunzio		
2024	A Sacrifice	Mazzy Monroe		
2025	O'Dessa	O'Dessa Galloway		
2026	Spider-Man: Brand New Day	Jean Grey		

=== Television ===
List of Sadie Sink television credits
Year	Title	Role	Notes	Ref.
2013	The Americans	Lana	Episode: "Mutually Assured Destruction"	
2014	Blue Bloods	Daisy Carpenter	Episode: "Insult to Injury"	
2015	American Odyssey	Suzanne Ballard	Main role	
2016	Unbreakable Kimmy Schmidt	Tween girl	Episode: "Kimmy Sees a Sunset!"	
2017–2025	Stranger Things	Maxine "Max" Mayfield	Main role (seasons 2–5)	

=== Theater ===
List of Sadie Sink stage credits
Year	Title	Role	Venue	Ref.
2011	White Christmas	Susan Waverly	Theatre Under the Stars, Houston	
2012	Annie	Annie	Theatre Under the Stars, Houston	
2012–2014	Annie	Annie, Duffy, and other orphan roles	Palace Theatre, Broadway	
2015	The Audience	Young Elizabeth	Gerald Schoenfeld Theatre, Broadway	
2025	John Proctor Is the Villain	Shelby Holcomb	Booth Theatre, Broadway	
2026	Romeo & Juliet	Juliet	Harold Pinter Theatre, West End	

=== Video games ===
List of Sadie Sink video game credits
Year	Title	Voice role	Ref.
2026	Unhinged	Claire	

== Awards and nominations ==
List of awards and nominations received by Sadie Sink
Year	Award	Category	Work	Result	Ref.
2018	Screen Actors Guild Awards	Outstanding Performance by an Ensemble in a Drama Series	Stranger Things	Nominated	
2018	MTV Movie & TV Awards	Best On-Screen Team (with Gaten Matarazzo, Finn Wolfhard, Caleb McLaughlin, and Noah Schnapp)	Stranger Things	Nominated	
2020	Screen Actors Guild Awards	Outstanding Performance by an Ensemble in a Drama Series	Stranger Things	Nominated	
2022	MTV Movie & TV Awards	Most Frightened Performance	Fear Street Part Two: 1978	Nominated	
2022	Hollywood Critics Association TV Awards	Best Supporting Actress in a Streaming Series, Drama	Stranger Things	Won	
2022	Saturn Awards	Best Performance by a Younger Actor in a Streaming Series	Stranger Things	Nominated	
2022	Woods Hole Film Festival	Best Performance in a Feature Film (Youth)	Dear Zoe	Won	
2022	SCAD Savannah Film Festival	Rising Star Award	The Whale	Won	
2022	Washington D.C. Area Film Critics Association	Best Youth Performance	The Whale	Nominated	
2022	Las Vegas Film Critics Society Awards	Best Female Youth	The Whale	Nominated	
2023	Alliance of Women Film Journalists EDA Awards	Best Woman's Breakthrough Performance	The Whale	Nominated	
2023	Critics Choice Awards	Best Young Actor/Actress	The Whale	Nominated	
2023	Nickelodeon Kids' Choice Awards	Favorite Female TV Star (Adult)	Stranger Things	Nominated	
2023	MTV Movie & TV Awards	Best Performance in a Show	Stranger Things	Nominated	
2025	Tony Awards	Best Actress in a Play	John Proctor Is the Villain	Nominated	
2025	Dorian Awards	Outstanding Lead Performance in a Broadway Play	John Proctor Is the Villain	Nominated	
2025	Dorian Awards	Outstanding Broadway Ensemble	John Proctor Is the Villain	Won	
2026	Saturn Awards	Best Younger Performer in a Television Series	Stranger Things	Nominated	
2026	Stage Debut Awards	Best West End Debut Performer	Romeo & Juliet	Won	
2026	Nickelodeon Kids' Choice Awards	Favorite Villain	Spider-Man: Brand New Day	Won	
2026	Nickelodeon Kids' Choice Awards	Favorite Female TV Star (Family)	Stranger Things	Nominated	
