= O'Dessa =

2025 film by Geremy Jasper

- Release poster
- Directed by: Geremy Jasper
- Written by: Geremy Jasper
- Produced by: Michael Gottwald; Noah Stahl
- Starring: Sadie Sink; Kelvin Harrison Jr.; Murray Bartlett; Regina Hall
- Cinematography: Rina Yang
- Edited by: Jay Rabinowitz; Jane Rizzo
- Music by: Geremy Jasper; Jason Binnick (songs and music)
- Production companies: Department of Motion Pictures; RT Features
- Distributed by: Searchlight Pictures (through Hulu)
- Release dates: March 8, 2025 (SXSW); March 20, 2025 (United States)
- Running time: 106 minutes
- Country: United States
- Language: English

O'Dessa is a 2025 American post-apocalyptic musical drama film written and directed by Geremy Jasper that retells the myth of Orpheus and Eurydice. It stars Sadie Sink, Kelvin Harrison Jr., Murray Bartlett, and Regina Hall. The film was released by Searchlight Pictures through Hulu on March 20, 2025.

== Plot ==
O'Dessa is set in a post-apocalyptic future where plazma, a toxic, flammable substance similar to oil, has poisoned the landscape. Media mogul Plutonovich rules the airwaves from "Onederworld", a private island where dissenters are tortured and killed for entertainment of the masses, but whoever wins the competition is deemed "The One" and will have a wish granted as a reward.

O'Dessa, seventh in a line of wandering musicians called ramblers, inherits her father's guitar after her mother's passing and after burning down her house, heads to the dangerous Satylite City to find her destiny. On the way, her guitar is stolen and pawned off. She sets off on a quest to return it, and as she does, she meets Euri Dervish, a musician and sex worker for the brutal Neon Dion, Plutonovich's main enforcer. O'Dessa and Euri fall in love and plan to run away to the safe city of Enid, but Dion catches them and threatens them both.

Euri steals enough money from Dion to buy O'Dessa's guitar back and tells her to leave for Enid without him. Thinking she has departed, Euri insults Plutonovich during a concert in despair. O'Dessa confronts Dion, who cuts off her ring finger before dying in a confrontation. O'Dessa and Euri plan to marry, but due to his sedition he is shipped off to Onederworld and forced to dance for his life. O'Dessa travels there to rescue him and sings before Plutonovich and his court, successfully becoming "The One" despite all of her guitar's strings but one being clipped. She wishes for Euri back, which is granted, but Plutonovich has given him a mind-altering "face job" that has left him brain-dead. O'Dessa sets her guitar on fire and destroys Plutonovich's plazma-powered media network, killing herself, Euri, and Plutonovich himself and freeing the masses from his control. As the film ends, plazma begins to fade from the landscape and the citizens vow to remember O'Dessa, spreading her music and message of hope.

== Cast ==
- Sadie Sink as O'Dessa Galloway
- Kelvin Harrison Jr. as Euri Dervish
- Murray Bartlett as Plutonovich
- Regina Hall as Neon Dion
- Mark Boone Junior as Father Walter
- Bree Elrod as Calliope Galloway
- Pokey LaFarge as Vergil Galloway
- Marinko Prga as Vulturo

== Production ==
In January 2023, Searchlight Pictures was developing a post-apocalyptic musical drama film written and directed by Geremy Jasper, with Sadie Sink in the lead role. In April, Regina Hall, Pokey LaFarge, and Murray Bartlett joined the cast. Principal photography began in May 2023, in Croatia.

== Release ==
O'Dessa had its world premiere at the 2025 South by Southwest Film & TV Festival on March 8, 2025. It was released by Searchlight Pictures through Hulu on March 20, 2025.

== Reception ==
=== Viewership ===
JustWatch, a guide to streaming content with access to data from more than 45 million users around the world, reported that O'Dessa was in the top five most-streamed films in the U.S. from March 17–30.

=== Critical response ===
On the review aggregator website Rotten Tomatoes, 39% of 54 critics' reviews are positive. The website's consensus reads: "Sadie Sink manages to rise above the schlock in a doomed rock-opera that sadly loses its purpose and steam while rambling to the finish line." On Metacritic, which uses a weighted average, the film holds a score of 41/100 based on 14 critics, indicating "mixed or average" reviews.

Elisabeth Vincentelli of The New York Times said O'Dessa is a bold and intriguing musical, praised its energetic style, and found Sadie Sink's performance solid, especially her singing. She stated that the film's postapocalyptic setting was creative but noted that its mix of elements sometimes felt uneven. Vincentelli appreciated the movie's music, highlighting its blend of emo Americana and power ballads, and found Regina Hall's performance as a flamboyant villain especially entertaining. Kristy Puchko of Mashable praised O'Dessa as a gender-bending, visually vibrant rock musical with a rebellious spirit. She highlighted Sink's performance as the androgynous heroine and Kelvin Harrison Jr.'s role as her romantic counterpart, noting the film's playful subversion of gender expectations. Puchko was particularly impressed by Hall's character and the movie's blend of surreal production design and punk energy. While she found most of the soundtrack spectacular, she felt the climatic song lacked the power and boldness needed to deliver a truly unforgettable finale.

William Bibbiani of TheWrap complimented O'Dessa's for its energetic and bracing approach, highlighting Sink's strong performance and the film's blend of rock musical and post-apocalyptic elements. He appreciated the movie's exploration of music's power and limitations, stating that it succeeds in depicting a world where art plays a role in resistance. Bibbiani found the film's visual style inconsistent due to its mix retro sets and CGI, but still enjoyed the costume design and character dynamics. He also noted that the soundtrack, while effective in the moment, lacked lasting impact. Randy Myers of The Mercury News describing O'Dessa's as a visually striking yet flawed dystopian musical. He noted that while the film has the potential to become a cult classic like Tommy or The Wall, it ultimately falls short due to underdeveloped storylines, drawing a parallel to the issues that hindered Megalopolis. Myers praised Sink for her performance, showcasing her talent as both an actor and singer. He also highlighted the film's energy and boldness but found it lacking in emotional investment, which could prevent viewers from caring about the characters' fates.
