= Nicholas Hogg =

English novelist, short story writer and poet

- Born: 26 June 1974 (age 52); Leicester, England
- Education: University of East London
- Occupation: Author
- Writing career
- Language: English
- Genres: Fiction, Poetry
- Notable works: "Zen" (2005); Tokyo (2015)
- Notable awards: 2005 New Ventures Writing Award
- Website: Nicholas Hogg

Nicholas Hogg (born 26 June 1974) is an English novelist, short story writer and poet from Leicester, His first novel, Show Me the Sky, was published in 2008 and was followed by The Hummingbird and the Bear in 2011 and Tokyo in 2015.

Hogg also writes poetry and short stories that have been published in various anthologies and journals. An avid cricket enthusiast, he has written articles on the sport. In 2012, he and literary agent Charlie Campbell organized a new incarnation of the Authors Cricket Club for fellow British authors, one hundred years after the original club, which had included Arthur Conan Doyle and J.M. Barrie among its members, had played its last match.

== Early life and education ==
Hogg was born in Leicester, England, and received a degree in psychology from the University of East London.

== Writing career ==
His first novel, Show Me the Sky, was published in 2008 and was nominated for the International IMPAC Dublin Literary prize. It centers on the hunt for a missing rock star who left behind only one clue: a page torn from the journal of a 19th-century Fijian missionary. It was reviewed by Publishers Weekly, which said that while some of the narrative strands developed too slowly, the parts of the book centering on the missionary's return to his homeland of Fiji with a group of Englishmen were a standout: "His vivid adventures at sea will remind many of Poe’s The Narrative of Arthur Gordon Pym of Nantucket."

His second novel, The Hummingbird and the Bear, was published in 2011 and won a K Blundell Trust award.

He published his third novel, Tokyo, in 2015. It is the story of a psychologist who, after a failed marriage, goes to Japan to find his long-lost love, while his daughter is being stalked by a disturbed cult survivor. It was named one of the "Best Novels of 2015" by The Observer, which called it "an intelligent, gripping and stylish love story set against a beautifully drawn contemporary Japan." Kirkus Reviews said of it: "The father-daughter relationship is touching and real in this atmospheric noir thriller." The novel was adapted for the film A Sacrifice (2024).

Hogg also writes poetry and short fiction that has been published in various anthologies and journals. His debut poetry collection, "Missing Person" is released with Broken Sleep Books on October 31, 2023. His 2005 short story "Zen", about a father telling his toddler daughter the story of his time in a Japanese jail, won the New Ventures writing award and a £5000 prize. and his short story "Naked" was read by actor Nigel Anthony on BBC Radio 4.

He has written articles on cricket for the website ESPNcricinfo.

== Personal life ==
After graduating from university, Hogg spent years living abroad in Fiji, the United States, and Japan and he later lived in India, as well. He sailed around the world three times as press officer on a Japanese NGO ship, Peace Boat, which promotes peaceful conflict resolution. He was employed in the early 2000s teaching language skills to refugees in London.

In 2012, Hogg and literary agent Charlie Campbell organized a new incarnation of the Authors Cricket Club, which counts among the players on its team, the Authors XI, writers including Sebastian Faulks, Tom Holland, Richard Beard and Anthony McGowan. The original Authors CC, which included members Arthur Conan Doyle and J.M. Barrie, had played its last game exactly one hundred years earlier, in 1912. Hogg serves as vice-captain and is one of the team's regular bowlers. He contributed a chapter titled 'Cricket and Home', in which he recounted growing up obsessed with cricket as a working-class kid in Leicester, to the book that team members collectively wrote about their first season playing together: The Authors XI: A Season of English Cricket from Hackney to Hambledon.

== Written works ==
=== Novels ===
- Hogg, Nicholas (2008). Show Me The Sky. London: Canongate. ISBN 978-1-84767-158-5.
- — (2011). The Hummingbird and the Bear. London: Little, Brown. ISBN 978-1-78033-219-2.
- — (2015). Tokyo. London: Cargo. ISBN 978-1-90888-573-9.

=== Poetry Collections ===
- Hogg, Nicholas (2023). Missing Person. Ceredigion/Cornwall: Broken Sleep Books. ISBN 978-1-915760-44-9.

=== Selected short stories ===
- Zen (New Ventures Writing Award winner, 2005)
- Naked (read on BBC Radio 4, 2007)
- Paradise (Included in Willesden Herald: New Short Stories 1; Pretend Genius Press, 2007. Stephen Moran, ed. ISBN 978-0-97785-262-8)
- Gimme Danger (Included in Punk Fiction: An Anthology of Short Stories Inspired by Punk; Anova Books, 2009. Janine Bullman, ed. ISBN 978-1-90603-266-1)
- How the Tiger Got Its Stripes (Carve Magazine, 15 June 2009; Editor's Choice, 2009 Raymond Carver Contest)
- Happy Birthday (Bridport Prize Runner-Up, 2009)
- Father and Gun (Part of the 'Photo Stories' exhibition combining photography and short stories, 2011)
- The Owl at the Gate (Included in Still: Short Stories Inspired by Photographs of Vacated Spaces; Negative Press, 2012. Roelof Bakker, ed. ISBN 978-0-95738-280-0)
- Jerusalem (London Magazine, 26 November 2015)

=== Selected poems ===
- Tattoo (2005)
- Mao (animated for the Berlin Poetry Festival, 2008)
