= Albert Kinross =

English journalist, magazine editor and writer (1870–1929)

Albert Kinross (4 July 1870 – 19 March 1929) was an English journalist, magazine editor and writer of novels, stories and articles.

== Biography ==
Kinross was born in London in 1870. He worked and published in many of the most popular periodicals of his day including the Boston Evening Transcript (as the London correspondent 1896–98), London Outlook (as associate editor 1898–1900), London Morning Post (as dramatic critic for two years); as well as articles in the Century, Harper's Magazine, The Pall Mall Magazine, Overland Monthly, New Outlook, The Windsor Magazine, Atlantic Monthly and The Strand Magazine.

He was a special correspondent in Russia during the Russo-Japanese War in 1905–6, an investigative reporter during turn of the century debates over immigration, art critic, book reviewer and political reporter. In 1907 he gave up journalism and became a full-time novelist. During World War I, Kinross returned to his roots in journalism serving as a captain in France and the Middle East, where he set up the Balkan News and Palestine News for the military. In 1917, he wrote a piece for the Atlantic Monthly called "Torpedoed" in which he described his experience aboard a ship that was torpedoed and sunk by a German submarine.

Kinross died of pneumonia on 19 March 1929 at Tunbridge Wells.

== Bibliography ==
- A Game of Consequences (1896)
- The Fearsome Island (1896)
- An Opera and Lady Grasmere (1899)
- Philbrick Howell (1901)
- The Early Stars (1901)
- Within the Radius (1901)
- The Way Back (1903)
- The Land of Every Man (1907)
- Davenant (1907)
- Joan of Garioch (1908)
- The Love-brokers (1909)
- The Fortunes of Virginia Bright (1915)
- The Truth About Vignolles (1922)
- God and Tony Hewitt (1925)
- The Torch (1925)
- At the Cenotaph (1928)
- An Unconventional Cricketer (1930)
