= Gren Wells =

American film producer

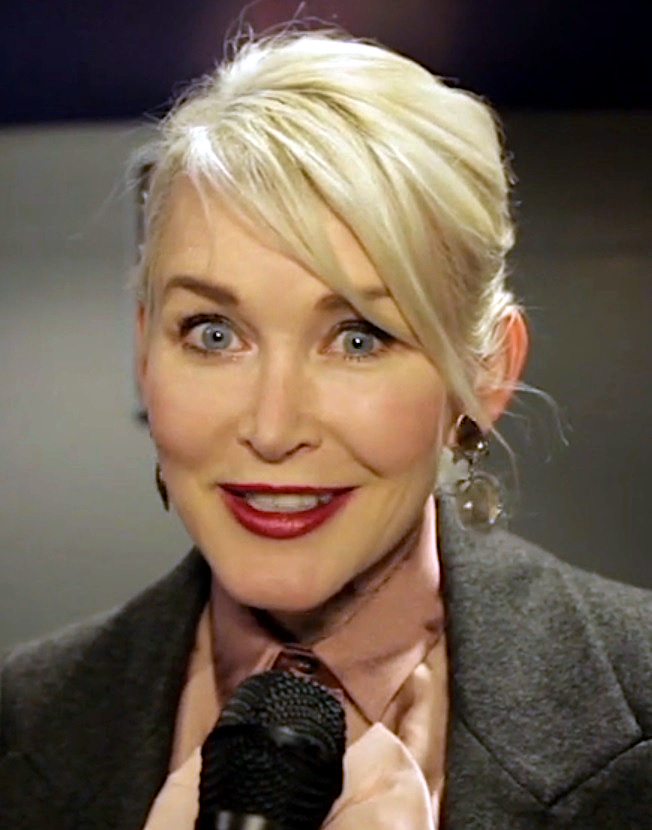
- Wells at DIFF 2015
- Born: Louisville, Kentucky, U.S.
- Occupations: Filmmaker, screenwriter, actor
- Known for: A Little Bit of Heaven, The Road Within

Gren Wells is a Kentucky-born filmmaker, screenwriter, and actress who works and resides in Los Angeles.

== Early life ==
Wells was born in Louisville, Kentucky, and raised in Greenwich, Connecticut. After attending Manhattanville College in Purchase, New York, Wells moved to New York City, where she starred in six indie films over a two-year span, one of which, Man About Town, won Best Short Film at the 1997 Sundance Film Festival. After moving to Los Angeles, Wells became a stand-up comic and wrote her first feature script, A Little Bit of Heaven.

== Career ==
Her first script, A Little Bit of Heaven, was sold to 20th Century Fox. This script later found a home at The Film Department and starred Kate Hudson, Gael García Bernal, Kathy Bates, Whoopi Goldberg, Rosemarie DeWitt, Lucy Punch, Romany Malco, and Peter Dinklage.

Her second film, The Road Within, was Wells' directorial debut. After premiering at the Los Angeles Film Festival it was acquired by Well Go USA. It stars Zoë Kravitz, Dev Patel, Robert Sheehan, Robert Patrick, and Kyra Sedgwick, and was released on April 17, 2015.

Wells directed the 2022 film Dear Zoe.

== Awards ==
Wells was chosen as one of Variety's Top 10 Directors to Watch for 2014.
