= Lost in the Garden =

2006 novel by Philip Beard

- First edition
- Author: Philip Beard
- Language: English
- Genre: Novel
- Publisher: Viking Press
- Publication date: 2006
- Publication place: United States
- Media type: Print (hardback)
- Pages: 208 pp
- ISBN: 0-670-03759-1
- OCLC: 62533976
- Dewey Decimal: 813/.6 22
- LC Class: PS3602.E2525 L67 2006

Lost in the Garden is a midlife-crisis novel by the American writer Philip Beard.

Set in contemporary Pittsburgh, Pennsylvania, it tells the story of 45-year-old Michael Benedict, who after the failure of his marriage, moves back with his parents and sets himself a goal of breaking 70 in his golf game and making the Champions Tour by age 50.
