= The Film Department =

- Company type: Independent
- Industry: Motion pictures
- Founded: June 2007
- Founders: Mark Gill; Neil Sacker
- Defunct: 2011
- Fate: Shutdown
- Headquarters: West Hollywood, California, United States

The Film Department (TFD) was an independent film production, finance and international sales company based in West Hollywood, California. Founded in 2007, the company suffered financial problems and produced two films – 2009's Law Abiding Citizen and The Rebound – before ceasing operations in 2011.

== History ==
The company was founded in June 2007 by Warner Independent Pictures and Miramax president Mark Gill and former Yari Film Group COO and Miramax veteran Neil Sacker.

TFD received initial funding in the form of a $200 million capitalization from G.E. Capital, which was to allow them to produce 6 films per year budgeted between $10 and $45 million. The company's intention was to make star-driven, commercial pictures at the high end of every genre aimed at worldwide audiences. Allen & Company also played a major role in financing TFD.

In July 2008, The Film Department and Downtown Music Publishing announced the formation of a new music film company and partnership, TFD Music. Through the partnership, Downtown Publishing served as the exclusive, worldwide administrator for the TFD Music copyrights and master recordings, and offered music supervision and soundtrack consulting services for motion pictures.

TFD's first release, Law Abiding Citizen (2009), generated $73 million in domestic ticket sales. But the company was unable to pay off all the release expenses. TFD's second film, The Rebound (2009), starring Catherine Zeta-Jones, was released by The Weinstein Company.

Despite announcing plans for an initial public offering (IPO) in February 2010, all TFD had to show for itself after two years of filmmaking was one hit and $34 million of losses.

The Film Department owed $62.3 million against $1.9 million of unspoken-for cash. Missed interest payments put the firm in default, and attempts to raise new equity failed. Lenders granted some leniency in hope of getting paid with IPO proceeds.

According to Reuters, TFD was going to use about 40 percent of the $85 million it wanted to raise to shrink debt. That would have left enough capital to finance just two more films before it embarked on another $160 million of borrowing.

The IPO was withdrawn in August 2010. TFD ceased operations in May 2011.
