= Philip Beard =

American novelist

- Born: 1963 (age 62–63)
- Education: Colgate University; University of Pittsburgh School of Law
- Occupation: Novelist
- Website: philipbeard.net

Philip Beard (born 1963) is an American novelist.

He was educated at Colgate University and the University of Pittsburgh School of Law. His novel, Swing, was a finalist for the Casey Award in 2015.

== Works ==
- Dear Zoe, a novel (New York: Viking, 2005)
- Lost in the Garden, a novel (New York: Viking, 2006)
- Swing, a novel (New York: Van Buren, 2015)

== Sources ==
Contemporary Authors Online. The Gale Group, 2006. PEN (Permanent Entry Number): 0000162696.
