= Another Hope =

Star Wars fan fiction novel

Another Hope is a Star Wars fan fiction novel that became controversial in 2006 when its author, Lori Jareo, released it for commercial sale.

== Plot ==
Another Hope is an alternative history re-imagining of the events in Star Wars Episode IV: A New Hope (1977). Mixing familiar moments from the film with new story material, Jareo drew inspiration and mixed in elements from the prequel films. The book deals in minute details of the Death Star, the politics of Darth Vader's henchmen, and insight into Vader and Princess Leia's adoptive parents. Biggs Darklighter, a minor character in the film, has been given an expanded role. The text adds a "Mary Sue" version of Ryoo Naberrie, described as "a gutsy underling on the Death Star".

== Publication and response ==
Jareo printed the book through her WordTech Communications company, and made the material available for sale through Amazon.com, Barnes & Noble, and Powell's City of Books. Jareo claimed the book was "not a commercial project", and that copyright law was not an issue because she wrote the book for herself. Despite these claims, Jareo agreed to Lucasfilm's request to stop selling Another Hope. Science-fiction authors Keith R. A. DeCandido and Lee Goldberg observed that problems with Another Hope would impact, and perhaps harm, print on demand publications.

Karen Traviss, author of several Star Wars novels, referenced the controversy by incorporating Jareo's name into Mando'a, the language of the Mandalorians. The verb jareor (the terminal r denoting the infinitive), along with a whole family of words to go with it, was added to the then expanding lexicon that Traviss was creating for the Republic Commando series, and given the definition of "risk your own life senselessly by pissing off a dangerous and heavily armed adversary, e.g. Boba Fett, Lucasfilm legal team"
