= The World Before =

The World Before may refer to:

- The World Before (novel)
- The World Before (The Walking Dead)
- The World Before (2026), a South Korean film
