= Clone Wars =

Fictional war in Star Wars

The Clone Wars, preceded by the two-year Separatist Crisis, is a fictional three-year conflict in the Star Wars franchise by George Lucas. Though mentioned briefly in the first Star Wars film (A New Hope, 1977), the war itself was not depicted until Attack of the Clones (2002) and Revenge of the Sith (2005). The Clone Wars are also the setting for three eponymous projects: a 2D animated series (2003–2005), a 3D film (2008), and a 3D animated series (2008–2014, 2020). They have featured in numerous Star Wars books, comics and games.

Within the Star Wars narrative, the Clone Wars involve a three-year war fought to prevent thousands of planetary systems from seceding from the Galactic Republic and joining the Confederacy of Independent Systems (CIS), colloquially referred to as the Separatists or Separatist Alliance. The Republic uses an army of clone troopers led by the Jedi Order against the Separatist battle droid army. The conflict was a scheme by the Republic's Supreme Chancellor Palpatine, secretly the evil Sith Lord Darth Sidious, seeking to implement the Sith's long-term plans to wipe out all Jedi and take over the galaxy. Palpatine intended this by giving the clone troopers a secret executive command, "Order 66" (in the form of a control chip) embedded in their brains, instantly making clones perceive their Jedi officers as traitors and kill them. He succeeded in issuing the command in Revenge of the Sith promptly leading to the deaths of numerous Jedi around the galaxy, allowing Palpatine to gain total power and ultimately convert the democratic Galactic Republic into the fascist autocratic Galactic Empire, a reign controlled through a military–industrial complex and featured in the original trilogy.

Lucas used the Clone Wars narrative to answer questions about the original trilogy, such as how the Empire originated and how Anakin Skywalker became Darth Vader. The political and military events of the Clone Wars draw inspiration from such real-world conflicts and historical events, as transition of the Roman Republic to the Roman Empire, the American Civil War, the First and Second World Wars, as well as contemporary events such as the war on terror and the Bush administration during the early 21st century.

== Concept and development ==
The first reference to the Clone Wars is in Star Wars creator George Lucas' third draft of the first film, which mentions the grizzled cyborg General Kenobi's "diary of the Clone Wars". The wars were mentioned twice briefly in the final version of the film, referring to Obi-Wan Kenobi as a general who served Leia Organa's (then-unnamed) father Bail Organa during the conflict. In drafting The Empire Strikes Back (1980), Lucas considered introducing a clone character who had been involved with the Clone Wars. Leigh Brackett's first draft of the film initially developed Lando Calrissian as a clone from a planet of clones involved in the Clone Wars mentioned in A New Hope and were nearly made extinct by the war. Boba Fett was also initially considered as being from a group of shocktroopers nearly wiped out by Jedi during the Clone Wars. However, these concepts were not included in the final version of the film. Lucas was more guarded about the details of the Clone Wars than any other element of Star Wars, even making them off-limits to licensed products and books.

Lucas has noted that Palpatine's rise to power is similar to that of Adolf Hitler in Nazi Germany; as Chancellor of Germany, the latter was granted "emergency powers", as is Palpatine. Lucas has also said that one of the primary influences for the political backdrop behind the Clone Wars, and all of Star Wars, was the Vietnam War and Watergate scandal era, when leaders embraced corruption for what they thought was the best course of action. In 2002, Lucas said:

All democracies turn into dictatorships—but not by coup. The people give their democracy to a dictator, whether it's Julius Caesar or Napoleon or Adolf Hitler. Ultimately, the general population goes along with the idea. What kinds of things push people and institutions in this direction? That's the issue I've been exploring: how did the Republic turn into the Empire? ... How does a good person go bad, and how does a democracy become a dictatorship?

The clone forces shown at the conclusion of Attack of the Clones comprised the largest digital army created for a film at that point. Lucas proposed to concept artists that Revenge of the Sith would open with a montage of seven battles on seven planets. Lucas then radically re-organized the plot; instead of opening the film with various Clone Wars battles, Lucas decided instead to focus on Anakin Skywalker. The absence of the "seven battles on seven planets" in part led to Lucas's decision to launch the CGI-animated Clone Wars television series; Lucas said the cartoon could "do better" at depicting the conflict.

== Depiction ==
Confederacy of Independent Systems
- Star Wars organization
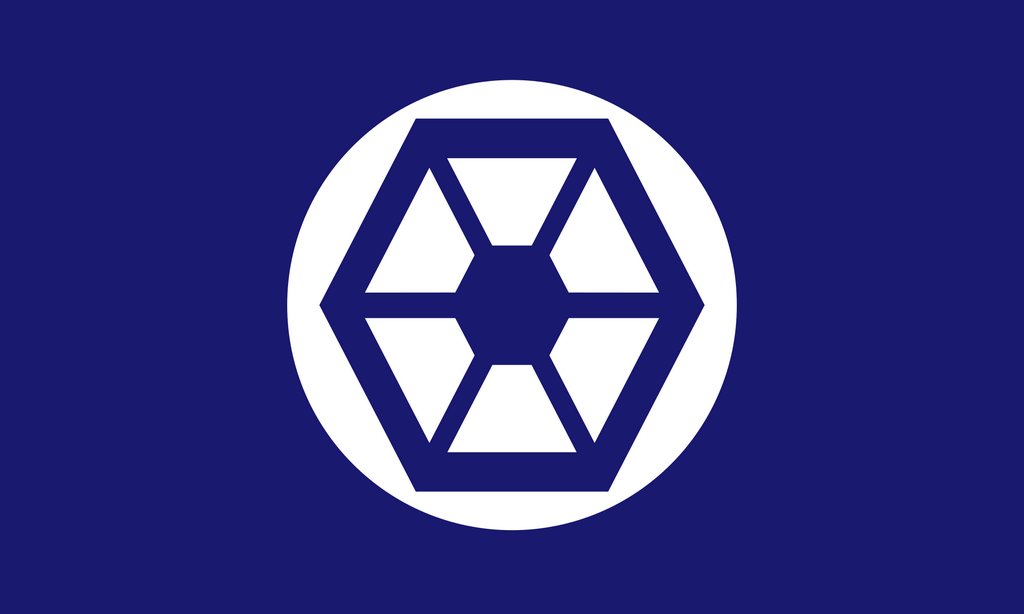
- Emblem and Flag of the Confederacy of Independent Systems
- First appearance: Attack of the Clones (2002)

In-universe information
- Type: Confederation, Separatist alliance
- Founded: 24 BBY (creation); 22 BBY (official founding)
- Defunct: 19 BBY
- Fate: Systems absorbed by the Empire; Corporations Imperialized; Separatist holdouts established
- Location: Star Wars galaxy (Outer Rim)
- Leader: Head of State: Count Dooku (22-19 BBY; Head of State); General Grievous (22-19 BBY; Commander-in-chief)
- Key people: Separatist Executive Council: Viceroy Nute Gunray of the Trade Federation; Poggle the Lesser; Wat Tambor of the Techno Union; San Hill of the Banking Clan; Shu Mai of the Commerce Guild; Separatist Parliament
- Technologies: Droid Army
- Affiliations: Sith (in secret)
- Enemies: Galactic Republic; Jedi Order

The Clone Wars are first mentioned in A New Hope when Obi-Wan explains to Luke that his father fought in them, to which Luke expresses doubt. It is later mentioned by Leia in her message that Obi-Wan served her father, who will later be identified as Bail Organa, in the Clone Wars. The Clone Wars was first depicted in Attack of the Clones, the release of which brought an end to Lucas's embargo on licensed material set during the era. Numerous novels, comic books, and video games exploring the conflict have been sanctioned by Lucas Licensing.

=== Origins ===
Attack of the Clones, set at the beginning of the Clone Wars, opens with the Galactic Republic's rising concern about the secession of thousands of star systems to the Confederacy of Independent Systems, which is publicly led by Count Dooku. Chancellor Palpatine manipulates Jar Jar Binks and the rest of the Galactic Senate, the legislature of the Republic, into granting him emergency powers to deal with the crisis. Investigating two attempted assassinations of Senator Padmé Amidala, Obi-Wan Kenobi discovers Dooku used the identity of a dead Jedi Master to secretly arrange the creation of a massive clone army on the Republic's behalf. Yoda leads the clone army to rescue Obi-Wan, Padmé, and Anakin Skywalker from the Separatists on Geonosis, and the first battle of the war ensues. At the battle's conclusion, Yoda declares: "Begun, the Clone War has." In the final scene of the movie, Anakin and Padmé get married in secret, in violation of Anakin's Jedi vows.

Palpatine promises safety at the cost of individual freedoms, all while tightening his own control over every facet of society; he promises to relinquish his powers once peace and order is restored. Among his first emergency orders are conscripting the Jedi as commissioned officers of the Grand Army of the Republic (GAR) armed forces; by seizing influence over the Jedi Council, Palpatine indirectly takes command of the GAR. He then nationalizes the military-industrial and financial sectors to finance the war effort, intentionally prolonging and exploits the Clone Wars to amass unprecedented political power, using his apprentice Darth Tyranus, Head of State of the Confederacy of Independent Systems, as a pawn to keep everyone distracted and focused on ending the war. During the 6th season of The Clone Wars, a clone trooper named Fives discovers that he and his brothers have chips implanted into their brains that would compel them to kill Jedi when "Order 66" is uttered. Unfortunately, the Jedi remained unaware of this as Fives was executed by a clone shock trooper ordered by Palpatine to conceal the existence of the contingency order.

=== The Twilight of the Republic ===
In the waning days of the three-year Clone Wars, as depicted in Revenge of the Sith, Palpatine long overstayed his term limits; he exploits the people's fears, systematically rewrites constitutional laws and crushes the institutions that threaten his goals. The Jedi are overstretched across the galaxy trying to end the war; they distrust Palpatine's motives, fearing he has come under the influence of a Dark Lord of the Sith named Darth Sidious. Their concerns are shared by more than 2,000 loyalist, pro-democracy senators who suspect Palpatine may not return his emergency powers once the war ends. These senators set into motion plans that will eventually lead to the creation of the Rebellion.

He orchestrates his own kidnapping by the Separatists by leaking classified information, and thereby bringing the war to the capital, Coruscant, to further spread terror. After killing Dooku and rescuing Palpatine from the Separatists during their assault on Coruscant, Anakin learns Padmé is pregnant. He becomes troubled by visions of her death in childbirth, and Palpatine lures Anakin to the dark side of the Force by promising to teach him how to prevent her premature demise. Meanwhile, Yoda is dispatched to Kashyyyk to stave off a Separatist invasion, and Obi-Wan Kenobi is dispatched to Utapau where he kills General Grievous.

=== The Purge ===
Palpatine reveals himself as a Sith Lord to Jedi Knight Anakin Skywalker, promising to save Padmé, Skywalker's secret wife, from dying in childbirth as Anakin has foreseen. Skywalker reports Palpatine's true identity to the Jedi Council.

However, when Jedi Master Mace Windu confronts Palpatine, Anakin comes to Palpatine's aid and helps him kill Windu. Desperate to save Padmé, Anakin pledges himself to the dark side of the Force and becomes Palpatine's third apprentice, Darth Vader. Palpatine declares the Jedi to be traitors, providing "irrefutable evidence" that they were the instigating masterminds behind the Clone Wars, and Sidious orders the clone troopers to execute Order 66, all but exterminateing the Jedi Order in a galaxy-wide slaughter, while sending Vader to the Jedi Temple along with several clone troopers to kill the remaining Jedi and Padawans in the temple, before sending Vader to kill the Separatist leaders on Mustafar and to issue a "shutdown command" to their droid army. With their demise, Sidious declares an end to the Clone Wars and the Republic's reformation into the Galactic Empire.

Two remaining Jedi, Obi-Wan Kenobi and Yoda, mount a counterattack. Obi-Wan defeats Vader and leaves him for dead, but Yoda's duel with Palpatine ends in a stalemate; both Jedi flee into exile. Grievously wounded, Vader is rescued by Palpatine and fitted with cybernetics and a black suit of armor with a life-support system. After Padmé dies giving birth to twins, Yoda and Obi-Wan decide to separate the children – Luke and Leia – to hide them from the Sith. Luke goes to Vader's stepfamily on Tatooine, while Leia is adopted by Senator Bail Organa of Alderaan.

=== Aftermath ===
Having "won" the war, with army liberators occupying every known star system, Palpatine orders them to annex planets, suppress the sectors and subjugate the people. Secured in his power and position, with no one left to stop him, Palpatine moves on to his final political opposition, the Senate; rather than dismantling it outright, he reduces it to a powerless symbol that exists only as an illusion of representation, and as an echo chamber for his rhetoric. Senators with no dedication to public service are bribed or coerced into rubberstamping Palpatine's policy; the remaining pro-democracy senators are spied upon, arrested, extorted, assassinated, or otherwise made to resign and/or disappear. Palpatine appoints governors to oversee all star systems in the Republic; these governors, later known as Imperial Moffs, report directly to Palpatine and are appointed without a vote or approval from any senators. This effectively sidelines the Senate, leaving it unable to influence how the galaxy is governed.

In the years after the Clone Wars, the Empire gradually transitioned from clone troopers to stormtroopers, replacing the aging clones with the less effective but more numerous stormtroopers, with Admiral Tarkin directly explaining the switchover, citing that a recruitment-based army of non-clones costs half as much as the clones. While recruits are not as well trained, there is a vast supply of them, and they are meant more for pacification duty than wartime combat. A defense recruitment bill enacts the transition from clone troopers to stormtroopers for good, and much of the new Imperial personnel is shown taking a dislike to the clone troopers. Clone troopers themselves react negatively towards the change as they were bred and raised to fight in combat but now are forced to defend isolated bases or retire indefinitely. Cast aside over time, and without familial or social networks to fall back onto it was difficult for them to integrate into civilian life, with some even becoming homeless as a result. A small handful of clone troopers were kept in service as instructors at Imperial academies across the galaxy, training up the next generation of non-clone soldiers as the new stormtroopers.

=== Other depictions ===
==== Clone Wars ====
The 2D-animated Clone Wars series (2003–2005) depicts several Clone Wars battles and was meant to generate interest in Revenge of the Sith. It also depicts the prelude to the opening battle of Revenge of the Sith and Palpatine's capture by General Grievous. It was released on home video in two volumes.

The original Clone Wars TV series is no longer considered canonical, since on 25 April 2014, The Walt Disney Company declared that all the existing Star Wars works and products except for the original and prequel films and the later The Clone Wars were now part of the separate Star Wars Legends continuity.

==== The Clone Wars ====
Several years later, Lucas chose to reboot the series as a 3D CGI series developed by Dave Filoni. After several years of production on the new television series, Lucas decided to spin off the first four episodes as a standalone film. The film, released in 2008, introduces Ahsoka Tano as Anakin's apprentice and depicts the Republic and the Separatists battling and attempting to gain permission to travel through Jabba the Hutt's territory.

The television series that followed (2008–2014, 2020) is likewise set against the backdrop of the Clone Wars, with the series finale taking place at the same time as the climax of Revenge of the Sith.

=== Live action ===
==== The Mandalorian ====
The series The Mandalorian features both flashback scenes to the Separatist Droid Army during the Clone Wars, as well as Grogu's memories of Order 66 on Coruscant.

==== Ahsoka ====
The Clone Wars are featured in Ahsoka Episode 5, where a flashback suggests the scene occurs on Ryloth, referencing Ahsoka's experiences in The Clone Wars, in live-action form. Additionally, scenes from the Siege of Mandalore are featured.

=== Novels ===
The 2008 novelization of The Clone Wars by Karen Traviss begins a series of five novels by Traviss and Karen Miller published by Del Rey Books between 2008 and 2010. The Clone Wars: Wild Space (2008) was written by Miller and focuses on Obi-Wan and Bail Organa. (Note: A prologue recounts the aftermath of the Battle of Geonosis; the rest of the book resumes after the events of the animated film.) Traviss returned to write The Clone Wars: No Prisoners (2009), in which Ahsoka is temporarily assigned to Captain Rex. Finally, Miller wrote the two-part Clone Wars Gambit (2010), subtitled Stealth and Siege, which deals with a bioweapon threat by Neimoidian general Lok Durd. (Note: Portrayed by George Takei in the 2008 animated series)

Dark Disciple (2015) novelizes a story arc about Asajj Ventress and Quinlan Vos from eight unfinished episodes of The Clone Wars. Catalyst: A Rogue One Novel (2016) is set during the Clone Wars and the subsequent couple of years. Thrawn: Alliances (2018) features flashbacks to the last year of the war featuring Anakin, Padmé, and Thrawn. Brotherhood (2022) is set during the Clone Wars, focusing on Obi-Wan and Anakin.

=== Comics ===
Dark Horse Comics published various comics set during the era, many of which were collected in a series of trade paperbacks over nine volumes. Dark Horse also published a ten-volume graphic novella series titled Clone Wars – Adventures (2004–07), utilizing the style of the 2D animated series and depicting original stories set during the era. A series of comics tying into the 3D animated series was released from 2008 to 2010, collected in three volumes, and was supplemented by an 11-volume series of graphic novellas released between 2008 and 2013.

Marvel's comic series Kanan (sometimes subtitled The Last Padawan) depicts the Star Wars Rebels character Kanan Jarrus as Jedi Padawan Caleb Dume during the conflict.

=== Video games ===
LucasArts also produced video games like Republic Commando and The Clone Wars that depict the conflict. The turn-based tactics video game Star Wars Zero Company takes place during the final year of the Clone Wars and places players under the control of the titular misfit mercenary group investigating a Separatist-aligned cult called the Infinite Coil.

== Analysis ==
Comparisons have been made between the political aspects of the Clone Wars and the events leading up to World War II. Radio host Clyde Lewis' article on historical similarities in Star Wars claims that Palpatine's tactics parallel those of Adolf Hitler and Nazi Germany; both leaders used wars and scapegoats to manipulate society's emotional state, thus providing the leadership with support and power. Another writer compares the Clone Wars with World War II in general, basing his argument on the fact that Lucas was a baby boomer, and the dark times featured in the original trilogy rival the dark, uncertain Cold War. Referring to Lucas's statements that the conflict in Star Wars was inspired by the cultural backdrop of the Vietnam War, journalist Chris Taylor said the Clone Wars are a parallel to World War II. Anne Lancashire from the University of Toronto also points out some similar nomenclature between the Clone Wars and the American Civil War.

Several publications compared the political context of the Clone Wars to the Iraq War. In claiming that the Star Wars galaxy under the deceitful Palpatine parallels the modern issues of the United States, an editorial on Antiwar.com states that Star Wars "establishes first the generally agreeable premise that it's right to overthrow oppressive government, before bringing into focus something more discomforting – that the corrupt tyranny referred to is our own". Additionally, an article from Wiretap claims that "like Palpatine, the Bush administration has been able to feed on people's fears to gain more power". Lucas stated that the Iraq war "didn't exist" when he developed the Clone Wars, but he did see parallels between the Vietnam War that inspired Star Wars and the war in Iraq. Star Wars producer Rick McCallum corroborated that the Clone Wars was developed before the Iraq War, adding that Lucas "is a product of Vietnam".

== Impact and critical response ==
The author of How Star Wars Conquered the Universe, Chris Taylor, calls the Clone Wars "a major part of Star Wars lore". In its attempt to keep its Star Wars line of toys active after Return of the Jedi (1983), Kenner devised a storyline that would involve the return of an exiled "genetic terrorist" and his Clone Warriors.

Timothy Zahn said the clones' unexpected appearance fighting for "the good guys" in Attack of the Clones—despite many years of fan speculation that the clones were an invading force—was "wonderfully blindsid[ing]". After seeing the CGI Clone Wars television show, Zahn was grateful that Lucasfilm rejected his initial Heir to the Empire draft, which involved an insane clone of Obi-Wan created during the conflict.

== See also ==
- List of Star Wars Clone Wars characters
