= Matriarch (novel) =

2006 novel by Karen Traviss

- Matriarch
- Author: Karen Traviss
- Language: English
- Series: Wess'Har Series
- Genre: Science fiction
- Publisher: HarperCollins
- Publication date: September 2006
- Publication place: United States
- Media type: Print (paperback)
- Pages: 387
- ISBN: 978-0-06-088231-0
- OCLC: 71520045
- LC Class: CPB Box no. 2665 vol. 12
- Preceded by: The World Before
- Followed by: Ally

Matriarch is a science fiction novel by the British writer Karen Traviss published in September, 2006. It is the fourth book in the Wess'Har Series, following The World Before and preceding Ally.

== Plot summary ==
Mohan Rayat and Lindsay Neville have been sent to the bottom of the ocean, after having been infected with c'naatat in the World Before, to spend forever living with the bezeri to help them rebuild and recover. But first they must undergo cellular reconstruction in order to survive in the depths, which happens at an astounding rate. Ade Bennett and Aras have the unpleasant duty to tell Shan Frankland, their isan, what they did. Since Shan threw herself into deep space to keep c'naatat from Rayat and Earth's government, she was not pleased that the symbiont was just given to them. She tells Esganikan of the Eqbas Vorhi about the development and she agrees to take precautions against it being spread.

Neville and Rayat are changed people, literally. They have developed gills and can sense their surroundings using sonar. The bezeri have put them to work extracting maps from a contaminated zone that the bezeri cannot enter. Rayat wants to acquire the bioluminescence ability that Shan has so he can try to communicate with the bezeri without the aid of the translation lamp. Shan had acquired bioluminescence in a previous encounter and passed that on to Ade. He in turn would have passed that on to Rayat and Neville when he infected them but this has not manifested itself. In an effort to make it manifest, Rayat asks for cells from the bezeri. The matriarch of the group brings the body of a youth that has recently died and Rayat and Lindsay put some of its tissue and blood into their own bloodstream.

Ade, Shan and Eddie have gone with the Eqbas to visit Umeh. While there, Shan and Ade finally consummate their relationship. The Eqbas are attacked by the Maritime Fringe, a neighboring state of Jejeno, but the attack causes no damage to the Eqbas and the Eqbas retaliate swiftly by destroying most of the far city of Buyg. They all take a trip in the Eqbas ship to visit that city and determine if they are now willing to cooperate. The Maritime Fringe responds with ineffective violence which is met with return fire from the Eqbas. Ade has noticed that his bioluminescence and Shan's seem to respond to each other and to other lights. He thinks the possibility exists that c'naatat is sentient and is communicating. Others don't want to think of that as possible so they are avoiding the issue. Shan calls Aras to let him know they are coming back to Wess'ej and discover that Vijissi, who was thrown into space with Shan because he refused to abandon her, has been found and is alive—infected with c'naatat.
