= City of Pearl =

2004 novel by Karen Traviss

- First edition cover
- Author: Karen Traviss
- Language: English
- Series: Wess'Har Series
- Genre: Science fiction
- Publisher: HarperCollins
- Publication date: March 2004
- Publication place: United States
- Media type: Print (Paperback)
- Pages: 400
- Followed by: Crossing the Line

City of Pearl is a science fiction novel by British writer Karen Traviss. Published in March 2004, it is the first book of the Wess'Har Series. Among the main characters are Shan Frankland, the hardened cop and forceful commander; Josh Garrod, the devout Christian and gentle leader; Aras, the lonely Wess'har, outcast by his horrible disease; and Lindsay Neville, the Marines Commander dealing with an unplanned pregnancy. City of Pearl is a book that deals with morals, especially concerning environmentalism, and keeps action sequences to a minimum.

== Plot introduction ==
The novel opens in the year 2198 and shows several preliminary scenes both on Earth and on alien planets; however, most of the action takes place much later, in the year 2374, on planet Cavanagh's Star. The planet is far from Earth, but very similar to it in atmosphere; it is claimed already by three alien races when a group of gethes (alien term for humans, literally carrion eater) arrives to explore, led by former police woman, Shan Frankland. The Bezeri (squid-like water dwellers) are the planet's natural inhabitants, the Isenj are invaders here to take advantage of unused land, and the Wess'har are the mediators, here to defend the Bezeri from Isenj pollution. Also coexisting on the planet is Constantine - a Christian colony of humans (led by Josh Garrod) who landed on the planet several generations ago in an attempt to escape the corruption of Earth. Constantine is guided by the Wess'har, Aras, who is plagued with a strange disease which outcasts him from Wess'har society. The political balance is tenuous, and Shan must play the mediator between her anxious, disobedient crew and the powerful military force of these alien beings. At the same time, she is troubled by her own past and the strange relationship that seems to be forming between her and Aras, as she struggles to lead a mission whose goal she doesn't yet consciously know.

=== Explanation of the novel's title ===
"City of Pearl" is the name humans have given to a Wess'har city located on planet Wess'ej. Josh Garrod's predecessor, Benjamin, who was taken to see the city by Aras, was said to have wept at its beauty. Many of the people of Constantine relate it to heaven, despite Aras' insistence that the City of Pearl is "just a city."

== Plot summary ==
On Planet Earth, Superintendent Shan Frankland (A hardened, self-sufficient, and brutally honest female cop) is preparing for retirement when she is confronted by politician Eugenie Perault, who recruits Shan to lead a top-secret mission into outer space on a ship named the Thetis. Her destination is Cavanagh's Star; a planet hundreds of light years away, but with an atmosphere strikingly similar to that of Earth. However, rather than risk exposure of the classified information Shan will need to carry out the unknown mission, Perault gives Shan a Suppressed Briefing (SB), which installs the information into Shan's subconscious mind, only to be brought forth when circumstances call for it. Knowing only that she was preceded on this journey by a colonist group named Constantine (who have never been heard from again), and that the time in speed-of-light travel will amount to 75 years on Earth but only months for her ship, Shan sets off in command of a mix-matched group of specialized civilians (called the "payload") anxious to use the planet for their own gain, and competing for control with Commander Lindsay Neville, the independent leader of a small force of marines.

When Shan and the Thetis crew reach Cavanagh's Star, however, they have big surprises ahead of them. Not only do they find Constantine alive and thriving as a religious colony within a carefully controlled biosphere designed to grow crops brought from Earth, but they also discover a unique and complex environment of alien plants and animals, including such species as the scavenger rock velvets, and the bog-dwelling predator shevens. The civilian scientists are itching to take samples and compile medical information. But the small band of humans soon learns that the planet isn't theirs to claim.

Two unique alien races inhabit Cavanagh's Star; the water-dwelling, squid-like Bezeri, and the bipedal Wess'har. The Wess'har, who originate from Wess'ej, the planet's moon, are strong environmentalists who see each species as an intelligent race; they are vegan, and take pride in the fact that their architecture is subterranean and unobtrusive. For centuries, they have protected Cavanagh's Star and the Bezeri from the Isenj - a third alien race who once attempted to colonize the planet. When the pollution from Isenj cities which they had built on the planet got so bad that it was killing Bezeri by the millions, the Wess'har stepped in. Now, not a single trace of the enormous Isenj civilization can be found on the planet - a stunning example to Shan's crew of what the Wess'har military is capable of.

On the planet, Shan meets Josh Garrod - the Christian leader of Constantine - who explains to her the ways of the Constantine people. They live in a hardworking, god-oriented society in which crime is almost non-existent and technology is kept to a minimum. Josh is in contact with the Wess'har (mainly through a representative named Aras) and follows their orders compliantly, knowing that the Wess'har could obliterate Constantine at any time, should they so wish.

According to the agreement between Shan and the Wess'har (made through Josh), the Thetis has been allowed to land and to make camp within the boundaries of Constantine. However, both Constantine and the Wess'har are wary of the Thetis and its intentions. The crew is permitted to explore the planet (with Wess'har or Constantine guides) but are given one ultimate rule: no samples. The Thetis must leave nothing and take nothing - and that means no scientific samples. Shan's crew grumbles at the arrangement, and some resolve not to heed the warnings given to them.

Through Josh, Shan eventually comes in contact with Aras, the Wess'har representative and protector of the Constantine colony. However, Aras is not a normal Wess'har, nor does he even look like one, though Shan does not yet know this. He used to be completely Wess'har, but his appearance, along with many of his attributes, had altered since he had been infected with a disease unknown to humankind. This "disease," called c'nataat, is actually a symbiotic creature which uses genetic information from previous hosts and ingested materials to alter its current host's genetics to fit its own needs. Though in many ways it had made Aras more efficient (it gives him an indefinite lifespan, and allows him to hold his breath under water for extended periods of time), the disease, which is transferable by touch, has cut him off from everyone he knows and left him suspended in time as his friends and family slowly die off. When Shan learns about his trouble - and touches Aras for the first time in 170 years - a bond begins to form between the two of them.

In the meantime, within the Thetis crew, issues are rising. Shan must fight for the power and respect she requires to run her mission; the "payload" scientists are angry at the restrictions placed on them, and Commander Neville is sore at her lack of power as only second in command. However, Shan and Neville learn to work together as the anger of the payload increases and Neville discovers she has yet another issue on her hands - an unplanned pregnancy has occurred from a hookup just days before the launch of the Thetis. Abortion pills are available, but Neville decides to have the baby, despite the fact that medic Hugel tells her it could be complicated. At the same time, Shan begins to get little whispers from her SB, telling her to look for a gene bank that Constantine supposedly possesses. It is a compilation of seeds and embryos from Earthly plants and animals, and rumored to be the largest ever compiled. Also, she keeps thinking the name "Helen," but does not know who this is.

This is the first of a series of 6 books dealing with the complications and consequences of the actions taken in the first book.

== Characters in "City of Pearl" ==
- Shan Frankland is an ex-police woman and leader of the Thetis expedition. She has a past in aiding "eco-terrorists." She is hardened and dangerous, but shows her humanity in her private confusion about her past actions and her arising feelings for Sergeant Bennett.
- Aras is a Wess'har, but is genetically altered due to his symbiotic "disease," c'nataat. He considers all species (including rats) to be intelligent, sentient races. He does not always understand humans, but he finds himself drawn to Shan, who shows him compassion.
- Josh Garrod is the leader of Constantine. A devout Christian, he keeps peace in his colony and organizes workers, but in terms of politics and many other things, he obeys the Wess'har.
- Lindsay Neville is Commander of the marines. She is initially angered at being placed under the command of a "copper," but learns to work with Shan when the going gets rough.
- Adrian Bennett is a marine Sergeant. He proves his bravery by saving Mesevy from an alien swamp at risk of his own life; however, he is mocked among his comrades for his "loose bowels." He seems to share a mutual attraction with Frankland.
- Eugenie Perault is the government worker who recruited Shan to lead the Thetis mission. She is given little development, but her voice often plays in Shan's mind as her SB memories resurface.
- Helen Marchant is the sister of Eugenie Perault. She was once a worker in an environmental corporation, but used her position to pass information to certain "eco-terrorists." Shan, who investigated the case, discovered this, but Helen used Shan's affinity for the environment to convince her to help them rather than report them. Shan initially believes that she did the right thing, but begins to have doubts.
- Mestin is the leading Wess'har Matriarch. She is cautious and seems to dislike humans. Aras often disagrees with her, but is usually able to compromise with her to get what he wants.
- Malcolm Okurt is the Captain of the Actaeon. He is described as emotionless, and works only as the extension of a large Earthly corporation.

=== The Payload ===
- Eddie Michallat: Journalist; He is honest and moral, despite initial preconceptions about his profession. He is much more laid back than his companions and takes pride in his ability to be disconnected with the stories he reports on. However, he finds himself more "connected" than ever when he turns Parekh in to Shan for taking a forbidden sample.
- Kristina Hugel: Physician; She is interested in Wess'har surgical procedures (especially near the end of the novel) and is not closely trusted by Shan or Neville.
- Mohan Rayat: Pharmacologist; Insistent and forward, Rayat leads most of the payload in their mutinous feelings toward Shan. Near the end, he deliberately leaves the camp, against a direct order, and causes a face off between the Isenj and Shan's search party.
- Sabine Mesevy: Botanist; Almost perishes in an alien swamp after falling from a living pathway. She is saved by Adrian Bennett. Being religious and wanting to spend much of her time in the church at Constantine, she obtains special permission to visit the town unescorted. She decides to stay behind at the end of the book.
- Oliver Champciaux: Geologist; Relatively polite and cooperative toward Shan.
- Louise Galvin: Xenozoologist; Follows Rayat in his deviation from the camp. She is accidentally shot in the crossfire.
- Surenda Parekh: Marine biologist; Finds and illegally takes a "sample" from a beach (a beached infant Bezeri which she believes to be dead). This causes much conflict between Thetis and the Bezeri. Parekh is eventually executed for her actions.
- Vani Paretti: Xenomicrobiologist.

== Major themes ==
Arguably, City of Pearl is themed around morals and human nature [2].

== Awards and nominations ==
- 2005 Campbell Award Finalist

== Publication history ==
- 2004, USA, HarperCollins ISBN 0-06-054169-5, Pub date March 2004, Paperback

The following titles are the 5 successor novels forming The Wess'har Wars

- 2004, Crossing the Line USA, HarperCollins ISBN 0-06-054170-9, Pub Date November 2004, Paperback
- 2005, The World Before USA, HarperCollins ISBN 0-06-054172-5, Pub Date November 2005, Paperback
- 2006, Matriarch USA HarperCollins ISBN 0-06-088231-X, Pub Date October 2006, Paperback
- 2007, Ally USA HarperCollins ISBN 978-0-06-088232-7, Pub Date April 2007, Paperback
- 2008, Judge USA HarperCollins ISBN 978-0-06-088240-2, Pub Date April 2008, Paperback

== Sources, references, external links, quotations ==
- John W. Campbell Award Finalists
- Review by Stuart Carter
- Amazon Customer Reviews (positive and negative)
