= Crossing the Line (novel) =

2004 science fiction novel by Karen Traviss

- Cover
- Author: Karen Traviss
- Language: English
- Series: Wess'Har Series
- Genre: Science fiction
- Publisher: HarperCollins
- Publication date: November 2004
- Publication place: England
- Media type: Print (Paperback)
- Pages: 385
- ISBN: 978-0-06-054170-5
- OCLC: 56896726
- LC Class: CPB Box no. 2303 vol. 10
- Preceded by: City of Pearl
- Followed by: The World Before

Crossing the Line is a 2004 science fiction novel by British writer Karen Traviss. It is the second book of the Wess'Har Series. Its predecessor was called City of Pearl, published in February of the same year. Some of the main characters include Shan Frankland, hardened copper now infected with c'naatat; Aras, the lonely Wess'har, outcast by his horrible disease; Eddie Michallat, journalist who finds himself in a position to affect history; and Lindsay Neville, the Marines Commander trying to deal with the loss of her newborn son David, and bent on revenge on Shan.

== Plot summary ==
The book concerns the struggle of Shan Frankland, a police officer in the year 2376, to cope with biological changes that have been made to her body by an alien species.
