= Star Wars: The Clone Wars (film) =

2008 film by Dave Filoni

- Theatrical release poster
- Directed by: Dave Filoni
- Written by: Henry Gilroy; Steven Melching; Scott Murphy
- Based on: Star Wars by George Lucas
- Produced by: Catherine Winder
- Starring: Matt Lanter; Ashley Eckstein; James Arnold Taylor; Dee Bradley Baker; Tom Kane; Catherine Taber; Nika Futterman; Ian Abercrombie; Corey Burton; Matthew Wood; Kevin Michael Richardson; David Acord; Samuel L. Jackson; Anthony Daniels; Christopher Lee
- Edited by: Jason W. A. Tucker
- Music by: Kevin Kiner
- Production companies: Lucasfilm Ltd.; Lucasfilm Animation
- Distributed by: Warner Bros. Pictures (Note: On December 21, 2012, the Walt Disney Studios completed the acquisition of Lucasfilm and the Star Wars film rights for the then-impending sequel trilogy. In 2019, the film's distribution rights were transferred from Warner Bros. Pictures to Walt Disney Studios Motion Pictures.)
- Release dates: August 10, 2008 (Grauman's Egyptian Theatre); August 15, 2008 (United States)
- Running time: 98 minutes
- Country: United States
- Language: English
- Budget: $8.5 million
- Box office: $68.5 million

Star Wars: The Clone Wars is a 2008 American animated space opera film directed by Dave Filoni and produced by Lucasfilm Animation. The voice cast includes Matt Lanter, Ashley Eckstein, James Arnold Taylor, Dee Bradley Baker, Tom Kane, Catherine Taber, Nika Futterman, Ian Abercrombie, Corey Burton, Matthew Wood, Kevin Michael Richardson, David Acord, Samuel L. Jackson, Anthony Daniels, and Christopher Lee. It is the first animated film in the Star Wars franchise and takes place shortly after Attack of the Clones (2002), at the start of the Clone Wars. In the film, Count Dooku and Jabba the Hutt's uncle Ziro orchestrate a plan to turn Jabba against the Galactic Republic by framing the Jedi for the kidnapping of his son. While Anakin Skywalker and his newly assigned apprentice Ahsoka Tano attempt to deliver the child back to his father, Obi-Wan Kenobi and Padmé Amidala lead separate investigations to uncover Dooku and Ziro's plot.

The Clone Wars premiered on August 10, 2008, at Grauman's Egyptian Theatre, and was released in the United States on August 15, by Warner Bros. Pictures. It received generally negative reviews from critics, and grossed $68 million on a budget of $8 million, making it the lowest-grossing film in the Star Wars franchise. The film serves as a pilot to the television series of the same name, which premiered two months after the film's release. It was also the final Star Wars film in the franchise to have the significant involvement of its creator, George Lucas, who sold Lucasfilm to The Walt Disney Company four years later.

== Plot ==
Early in the Clone Wars, (Note: Which began after the events of Star Wars: Episode II – Attack of the Clones (2002).) Galactic Republic forces find themselves stranded across the Outer Rim as the Separatists gain control of more hyperspace lanes. Jedi Knight Anakin Skywalker leads the Republic against a droid army on Christophsis with his master Obi-Wan Kenobi and clone captain Rex. (Note: Also depicted in The Clone Wars (2008) episodes "Cat and Mouse" and "The Hidden Enemy".) However, the clone army is soon overwhelmed by reinforcements. A young Jedi named Ahsoka Tano is sent by Grand Master Yoda to become Anakin's Padawan, much to his dismay. Obi-Wan stalls the leader of the Separatist forces while Anakin works together with Ahsoka to secure victory for the Republic.

Meanwhile, Count Dooku, looking to secure a partnership with the Hutts, has kidnapped Rotta, the infant son of Jabba the Hutt. Obi-Wan, negotiating with Jabba regarding trade routes, promises the safe return of his son. Anakin leads a clone army to the planet of Teth to rescue Rotta, who is being held inside a monastery. He and Ahsoka rescue Rotta, who is falling ill, as they discover that Dooku, who staged the kidnapping himself, has led the two Jedi into a trap. Dooku intends for the Hutts to blacklist the Jedi to allow the Separatists to gain the support of the Hutts, while hiring assassin Asajj Ventress to retrieve or kill Rotta. Ventress neutralizes a group of bounty hunters Jabba sent to retrieve his son and shows him footage of Anakin expressing his distaste with the Hutts.

Anakin and Ahsoka, beginning to respect each other, escape the monastery with Rotta and R2-D2. En route to Tatooine, the two tend to Rotta's illness. Obi-Wan arrives at the Teth monastery, where he retrieves the stranded clones and engages in a duel with Ventress. Meanwhile, Padmé Amidala goes to Coruscant to confront Jabba's uncle Ziro, who she finds out has conspired with Dooku to engineer the downfall of his nephew, which would allow him to seize power over the Hutt clans. However, Padmé is soon discovered and detained. With the help of C-3PO, she escapes, and Ziro is arrested.

Anakin and Ahsoka arrive on Tatooine to return Rotta to his father, though their ship comes under fire from Separatist forces and crash-lands far away from Jabba's palace. On his way to Jabba's palace, Anakin is intercepted by Dooku, and the two engage in a lightsaber duel. Dooku realizes that Anakin is not in possession of Rotta; inside the palace, Ahsoka delivers Rotta to Jabba, but he orders their execution. Padmé tells Jabba of his uncle's duplicity, and he reassures her that the Hutt Clan will punish Ziro harshly. A treaty is signed that allows Republic forces to pass through Jabba's territory.

== Voice cast ==
- Matt Lanter as Anakin Skywalker, a former Jedi Padawan who has recently been promoted to the rank of Jedi Knight, and a general in the Republic's army, who leads the 501st Legion. Hayden Christensen was considered to reprise his role as Anakin from the prequel trilogy before Lanter was selected. Lanter replaces Mat Lucas, who voiced the character in the 2003 micro-series, Star Wars: Clone Wars.
- Ashley Eckstein as Ahsoka Tano, Anakin's new Padawan apprentice and commander of the 501st Legion.
- James Arnold Taylor as Obi-Wan Kenobi, a Jedi Master, Anakin's mentor, and general of the Republic, who leads the 212th Attack Battalion. Ewan McGregor was considered to reprise his role as Obi-Wan from the prequel trilogy before Taylor was selected. Taylor reprises his role from the Clone Wars micro-series.
  - Taylor also voices 4A-7, a droid spy.
- Dee Bradley Baker as the clone troopers, Captain Rex, and Commander Cody. Baker replaces André Sogliuzzo, who voiced the characters in the Clone Wars micro-series.
- Tom Kane as:
  - Yoda, the Jedi Grandmaster and leader of the Jedi Council. Frank Oz was considered to reprise his role as Yoda from the prequel and original trilogies before Kane was selected. Kane reprises his role from the Clone Wars micro-series.
  - The Narrator, who explains the film's events and plot.
  - Admiral Yularen, an admiral of the Republic Navy assigned to Anakin.
- Nika Futterman as:
  - Asajj Ventress, a Sith assassin, a former Jedi and Count Dooku's disciple. Futterman replaces Grey DeLisle, who voiced the character in the Clone Wars micro-series.
  - TC-70, Jabba's protocol droid.
- Ian Abercrombie as Chancellor Palpatine / Darth Sidious, the Supreme Chancellor of the Galactic Republic who is secretly a powerful Sith Lord in disguise, Count Dooku's master, and the mastermind behind the Clone Wars. Ian McDiarmid was considered to reprise his role as Palpatine from the prequel and original trilogies before Abercrombie was selected. Abercrombie replaces Nick Jameson, who voiced the character in the Clone Wars micro-series.
- Corey Burton as:
  - Ziro the Hutt, Jabba's uncle and a member of the Hutt Clan who is secretly in cahoots with Count Dooku and the Separatists.
  - Whorm Loathsom, the commander of the Separatist Droid Army occupying Christophsis
  - KRONOS-327, an assassin droid working for Ziro.
- Catherine Taber as Padmé Amidala, the queen and senator of Naboo and Anakin's wife. Natalie Portman was considered to reprise her role as Padmé from the prequel trilogy before Taber was selected. Taber replaces Grey DeLisle, who voiced the character in the Clone Wars micro-series.
- Matthew Wood as the battle droids.
- Kevin Michael Richardson as Jabba the Hutt, a powerful and notorious crime lord, the leader of the powerful Hutt Clan, and Rotta's father.
- David Acord as Rotta the Huttlet, Jabba's son.
- Samuel L. Jackson as Mace Windu, a Jedi Master, senior member of the Jedi Council, and general of the Republic. Jackson reprises his role from the prequel trilogy. The character is voiced by Terrence C. Carson in the subsequent television series, reprising his role from the Clone Wars micro-series.
- Anthony Daniels as C-3PO, Anakin's protocol droid. Daniels reprises his role from the live-action films and also voiced C-3PO in other media.
- Christopher Lee as Count Dooku / Darth Tyranus, a Sith Lord and the puppet leader of the Separatist Alliance. Lee reprises his role from the prequel trilogy and for the last time before his death in 2015. The character is voiced by Corey Burton in the subsequent television series, reprising his role from the Clone Wars micro-series.

== Production ==
=== Development ===
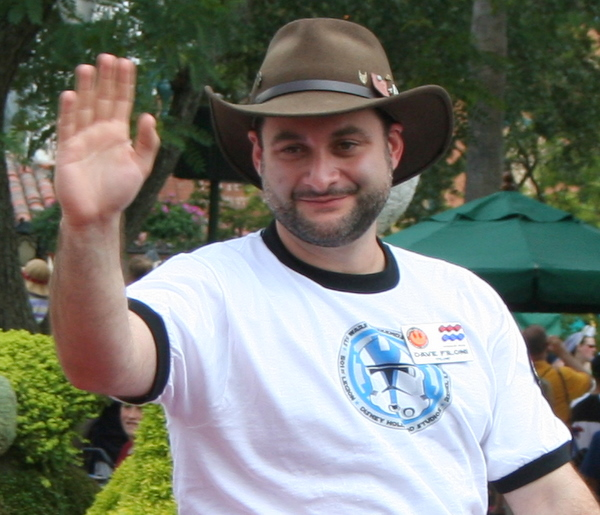
Director Dave Filoni

Star Wars: The Clone Wars was made to serve as both a stand-alone story and a lead-in to the weekly animated TV series of the same name. George Lucas had the idea for a film after viewing some of the completed footage of the early episodes on the big screen. Those first few episodes, originally planned for release on television, were then woven together to form the theatrical release. Warner Bros. Entertainment had tracked the series' development from the beginning, and Lucas decided on a theatrical launch after viewing early footage declaring "This is so beautiful, why don't we just go and use the crew and make a feature?" This decision helped convince WB parent company Time Warner to distribute the movie, and to encourage its subsidiary Cartoon Network to air the series. Lucas described the film as "almost an afterthought." Howard Roffman, president of Lucas Licensing, said of the decision, "Sometimes George works in strange ways." Producer Catherine Winder said the sudden decision added to an already large challenge of establishing a show "of this sophistication and complexity," but she felt it was a good way to start the series, and thought budgetary constraints forced the production team to think outside the box in a positive way.

The story of the kidnapped Hutt was inspired by the Sonny Chiba samurai film Shogun's Shadow.

Actors Samuel L. Jackson, Christopher Lee, Anthony Daniels, and Matthew Wood vocally reprised their respective roles as Mace Windu, Count Dooku, C-3PO and the B1 Battle Droids. However, Jackson and Lee did not reprise their roles in the television series.

=== Animation ===
Lucasfilm Animation used the Maya 3D modeling software to animate both the film and the series. Lucas chose a distinct, stylized look for the film that was inspired by Japanese anime and manga, and the Supermarionation used in British 1960s series such as Thunderbirds. Lucas also decided to create the animated film and series from a live-action perspective, which Winder said set it apart from other CGI films. Essentially, it "meant using long camera shots, aggressive lighting techniques, and relying on editing instead of storyboards." Animators also reviewed designs from the original 2003 Clone Wars series when creating the animation style for the film and the new series. In charge was Steward Lee, working as the storyboard artist during filming.

== Music ==
Star Wars: The Clone Wars – Original Motion Picture Soundtrack

Film score by Kevin Kiner (some original themes by John Williams)
- Released: August 12, 2008
- Recorded: April 17–18, 2008
- Length: 1:07:39
- Label: Sony Classical

The musical score for Star Wars: The Clone Wars was composed by Kevin Kiner. The original motion picture soundtrack was released by Sony Classical on August 12, 2008. The disc begins with the main theme by John Williams, followed by more than 30 separate music cues composed by Kiner. Kiner is known for his work on such television series as Stargate SG-1, Star Trek: Enterprise, Superboy and CSI: Miami. The soundtrack uses some instruments never heard before in a Star Wars score, including erhus, duduks, and ouds.

Track listing
| No. | Title | Length |
|---|---|---|
| 1. | "Star Wars Main Title & A Galaxy Divided" | 1:13 |
| 2. | "Admiral Yularen" | 0:57 |
| 3. | "Battle of Christophsis" | 3:20 |
| 4. | "Meet Ahsoka" | 2:45 |
| 5. | "Obi-Wan to the Rescue" | 1:24 |
| 6. | "Sneaking Under the Shield" | 4:25 |
| 7. | "Jabba's Palace" | 0:46 |
| 8. | "Anakin vs. Dooku" | 2:18 |
| 9. | "Landing on Teth" | 1:44 |
| 10. | "Destroying the Shield" | 3:09 |
| 11. | "B'omarr Monastery" | 3:11 |
| 12. | "General Loathsom/Battle Strategy" | 3:08 |
| 13. | "The Shield" | 1:37 |
| 14. | "Battle of Teth" | 2:45 |
| 15. | "Jedi Don't Run!" | 1:22 |
| 16. | "Obi-Wan's Negotiation" | 2:08 |
| 17. | "The Jedi Council" | 2:05 |
| 18. | "General Loathsom/Ahsoka" | 3:40 |
| 19. | "Jabba's Chamber Dance" | 0:42 |
| 20. | "Ziro Surrounded" | 2:21 |
| 21. | "Scaling the Cliff" | 0:45 |
| 22. | "Ziro's Nightclub Band" | 0:54 |
| 23. | "Seedy City Swing" | 0:35 |
| 24. | "Escape from the Monastery" | 3:13 |
| 25. | "Infiltrating Ziro's Lair" | 2:22 |
| 26. | "Courtyard Fight" | 2:42 |
| 27. | "Dunes of Tatooine" | 2:00 |
| 28. | "Rough Landing" | 3:04 |
| 29. | "Padmé Imprisoned" | 0:51 |
| 30. | "Dooku Speaks with Jabba" | 1:28 |
| 31. | "Fight to the End" | 3:59 |
| 32. | "End Credits" | 0:52 |
| Total length: | | 1:07:39 |

== Marketing ==
=== Merchandise ===
Star Wars: The Clone Wars merchandise was first released on July 26, 2008. Hasbro released several 3 3/4-inch Clone Wars action figures, an electronic clone trooper helmet, a customizable lightsaber, and an electronic All Terrain Tactical Enforcer (AT-TE). Target and KB Toys also devoted shelf space for Clone Wars toys, but did not hold midnight releases or pursue the branding opportunities Toys "R" Us did. Toys "R" Us mounted digital clocks in all 585 of its stores that counted down to the release of the Clone Wars toys, and more than 225 of the stores opened at midnight for the debut of the Star Wars products. Two of the Toys "R" Us flagship outlets in Mission Bay, San Diego and Times Square in Manhattan, New York City held costume and trivia contests on July 26, and gave away limited-edition Star Wars toys with every purchase. A section of the Toys "R" Us website was also dedicated to The Clone Wars. The toy line continues with The Clone Wars figures being well received by collectors for their detail to the characters and vehicles.

=== Food partnership ===
Due to Lucas' sudden decision to produce the film, Lucas Licensing did not have time to enter into agreements with previous Star Wars marketing partners like Pepsi, Burger King and Kellogg's, with which the Lucasfilm licensing company had a ten-year marketing plan for the other films. When questioned by The New York Times about Star Wars merchandising in July 2008, a Pepsi spokesperson was unaware a new Star Wars film was being released. On August 15, McDonald's held its first ever Happy Meal promotion for a Star Wars film and for four weeks, 18 exclusive toys came in specially designed Happy Meal boxes.

=== Print media ===
Dark Horse Comics published a six-issue digest-sized comic book miniseries. Randy Stradley, vice president of publishing for Dark Horse, said the sudden decision to release the Clone Wars film required the company to temporarily delay plans for two other Star Wars comic book series, Dark Times and Rebellion. The Clone Wars comics did not receive the promotional campaign it otherwise would have due to the abruptness of the theatrical and comic book releases. Topps, the trading cards company, released a series of 90 Clone Wars cards on July 26, which also includes foil cards, motion cards, animation cel cards and rare sketch cards by top Star Wars artists and Lucasfilm animators. DK Publishing and the Penguin Group released books, activities and other merchandise that tied in with the film. Also released was the Clone Wars: The Visual Guide, published by DK, and Star Wars: The Clone Wars in the UK, published by Puffin and in the U.S. by Grosset & Dunlap. The publishers also released a storybook, picture books and an activity book. At the American International Toy Fair, Lego announced a product line for the film and the TV series, to be released in July 2008 in the United States and in August 2008 in the United Kingdom.

=== Video games ===
The LucasArts video game developer adapted the film into Star Wars: The Clone Wars – Jedi Alliance for the Nintendo DS and Star Wars: The Clone Wars – Lightsaber Duels for Wii. A reviewer from PocketGamer.co.uk said his expectations for Jedi Alliance were low due to poor Clone Wars movie reviews, but he found the game "a varied and well-paced experience." Lego Star Wars III: The Clone Wars adapted the film, along with episodes from seasons one and two of the 2008 TV series. The game released on all platforms in 2011.

=== Portable media players ===
A Star Wars: The Clone Wars MP3 player was released in August 2008. The player includes one gigabyte of memory, which holds 200 songs or 20 hours of music and comes with three interchangeable faceplates: a green one with Yoda and a lightsaber on it, a silver one with Captain Rex and a Galactic Empire logo on it, and one with two clone troopers on Coruscant. One review claimed it improved upon a Darth Vader MP3 player released in July 2008, which featured only 512 megabytes of memory and a dated visual display. A Star Wars iPod iSpeaker (a speaker/dock for iPods, iPhones and MP3 players) was also released. The speaker includes an image of Captain Rex and three other Clone Troopers.

=== Racing sponsorship ===
A Star Wars: The Clone Wars open wheel car for the IndyCar Series was unveiled at the 2008 San Diego Comic-Con. The No. 26 car, which also included Blockbuster Inc. decals was driven by Andretti Green Racing driver Marco Andretti in the 2008 Peak Antifreeze Indy Grand Prix, Andretti later said of the sponsorship: "I'm hoping that my upcoming battle at Infineon will be as exciting as anything in a Star Wars movie so I can win it for both Blockbuster and Lucasfilm." The car finished 14th at Infineon on the lead lap, which Andretti attributed to a slow pit stop early in the race; he added: "I just don't think it was a very good performance for us today." The Clone Wars car was the second collaboration between Lucasfilm, Blockbuster and Andretti Green Racing. The first collaboration was an Indiana Jones and the Kingdom of the Crystal Skull car which was also run by Andretti in the 2008 Indy 500 where it would finish in third place.

=== Novelization ===
A novelization of the film by Karen Traviss was released by Del Rey Books on July 26, 2008. In addition to narrating the film's plot from various points of view, it includes some of Anakin's memories of his early childhood as a Hutt slave, as well as some of Dooku's recollections of battling the Mandalorians (previously explored in the 2002 comic book Jango Fett: Open Seasons).

== Release ==
=== Theatrical ===
The Clone Wars premiered on August 10, 2008, at Grauman's Egyptian Theatre.

=== Home media ===
The film's two-disc DVD and Blu-ray Disc was released on November 11, 2008, in the United States and on December 8, 2008, in the United Kingdom. The film was released as a single-disc DVD, two-disc Special Edition DVD, and Blu-ray Disc, all of which are THX certified. The standard-definition versions include the film in widescreen format with Dolby Digital 5.1 Surround EX sound, and with feature-length audio commentary.

The film is also available on the Disney+ streaming service, which launched on November 12, 2019, which the 1998-2022 Warner Bros. Pictures logo was removed in the later releases following the expiration of the distribution rights to the film in 2012.

== Reception ==
=== Critical response ===
On Rotten Tomatoes, the film has an approval rating of 18% based on 171 reviews and a rating of 4.20 out of 10. The critics consensus reads: "Mechanical animation and a less-than stellar script make The Clone Wars a pale shadow of George Lucas' once great franchise." On Metacritic, the film has a score of 35 out of 100 based on 30 critics, indicating "generally unfavorable reviews". Audiences polled by CinemaScore gave the film an average grade of "B−" on an A+ to F scale. This made it the lowest-rated Star Wars film on all three websites.

Entertainment Weekly listed Star Wars: The Clone Wars as one of the five worst films of 2008 with critic Owen Gleiberman saying,

It's hard to tell the droids from the Jedi drones in this robotic animated dud, in which the George Lucas Empire Strikes Back—at the audience. What wears you out is Lucas' immersion in a Star Wars cosmology that has grown so obsessive-compulsively cluttered yet trivial that it's no longer escapism; Because this movie has bad lightsaber duels and the lack of the original cast, it's something you want to escape from.

Ain't It Cool News posted two reviews of the film during the week before its release, but pulled them down due to an embargo placed on those attending the screening its writers attended. The same reviews were re-posted on the site, on the day of the film's release. The retraction prompted some readers to allege a conspiracy by Lucasfilm to keep negative press out of circulation until the release of the film, but although the review by site creator Harry Knowles was negative, Drew McWeeny said that his review was positive and that no such conspiracy existed.

Several critics compared The Clone Wars to a Saturday morning cartoon and described it as little more than a plug for the upcoming animated series. Linda Barnard of the Toronto Star said that the movie "pretty much drives a stake into the heart of every loyal fan of the movies. And now [George Lucas is] out to stick it to those too young to know about Jar Jar Binks." Variety magazine reviewer Todd McCarthy said: "This isn't the Star Wars we've always known and at least sometimes loved." Joe Neumiar, of the New York Daily News, wrote: "If this were a true Star Wars film, right about now somebody would say, '...I've got a bad feeling about this.'" In his review for Entertainment Weekly, critic Owen Gleiberman gave the film an F grade and wrote: "George Lucas is turning into the enemy of fun." Carrie Rickey of The Philadelphia Inquirer said: "The best that can be said about the movie is that it's harmless and mostly charmless. The Clone Wars is to Star Wars what karaoke is to pop music."

Remember how people talked about the Star Wars prequels like they were the worst movies ever made, when really, come on, they weren't THAT bad? The Clone Wars actually IS that bad.
— Film critic, Eric D. Snider

The main criticism toward the film was the animation. Many criticized it as cheap, wooden, non-engaging and out-of-date; some reviewers drew negative comparisons to 1960s marionette-based shows Thunderbirds and Fireball XL5, although George Lucas previously said the animation style was a deliberate homage to such shows. Tom Long of MediaNews said the animation "is downright weak compared to what's generally seen onscreen these days" and that the characters are so stiff they look like they were "carved by Pinocchio's father." Roger Ebert gave the film 1.5 stars out of 4 and said that "the characters have hair that looks molded from Play-Doh, bodies that seem arthritic, and moving lips on half-frozen faces—all signs that shortcuts were taken in the animation work." McCarthy said that "the movements, both of the characters and the compositions, look mechanical, and the mostly familiar characters have all the facial expressiveness of Easter Island statues." However, some of the same reviewers who criticized the animation acknowledged some positive elements about it; McCarthy said that it allowed for "somewhat more dramatic compositions and color schemes," and Carrie Rickey, of The Philadelphia Inquirer, said the scenery and backgrounds were "vivid and alive", although she also said that the characters "move as you would imagine the statues at a waxworks might."

Reviewers also criticized the dialogue, which Ebert said was limited to "simplistic declamations" and Claudia Puig of USA Today described as "stilted and overblown, a problem also in some of the live-action incarnations." Many critics also said that the battle scenes were repetitive and lacked tension; McCarthy described the action sequences as "a little exposition, an invasion; some more exposition, a lightsaber fight; a bit more blah-blah, a spaceship dogfight, and on and on." Jason Anderson, of the Globe and Mail, wrote that although The Clone Wars is intended for younger audiences, "parents may be perturbed by the film's relentless violence." Ebert also found protagonist Ahsoka Tano "annoying," and Michael Rechtshaffen, of The Hollywood Reporter, said the attempts of humor amid the bickering between Ahsoka Tano and Anakin Skywalker are "strained". Puig said she enjoyed the character, and that "her repartee with Anakin enlivens things."

=== Box office ===
The Clone Wars earned $68,282,845 worldwide, including $35,161,554 in North American domestic box office grosses and $33,121,290 in international grosses. The film earned $14,611,273 on 3,452 screens in its opening weekend, including $6,228,973 on its opening day, August 15. It was the third-highest earning film of the weekend in spite of negative critical reception, behind Tropic Thunder and The Dark Knight, which earned $25.8 million and $16.3 million, respectively. Dan Fellman, head of distribution for Warner Bros., said that the box office performance met expectations because two-thirds of the audience were families and the budget for the film was $8.5 million, frugal considering it was a CGI film and because the film was meant to introduce the animated series. Fellman said: "It was targeted to a specific audience for specific reasons. We accomplished that mission, and it will continue in another medium." When The Clone Wars dropped to $5.6 million in its second week of release, ContactMusic.com described it as "the first bona fide Star Wars flop." The film also earned $23,428,376 from DVD sales in the US.

== Accolades ==
The film was nominated for a Golden Raspberry Award in the category "Worst Prequel, Remake, Rip-Off or Sequel", but lost to Indiana Jones and the Kingdom of the Crystal Skull, another movie released by Lucasfilm.
