= Wess'Har =

The Wess'har Wars series is a six-book science fiction novel series written by author Karen Traviss and is set several hundred years in the future. It involves humanity's contact with a number of alien species with conflicting interests and beliefs, while her central character, Shan Frankland, is caught in the middle of a coming conflict. The series has a focus on environmental impact. All six novels were published by Eos, an imprint of HarperCollins: City of Pearl, Crossing the Line, The World Before, Matriarch and Ally (formerly Task Force). The last book of the series, Judge was released on March 25, 2008.

== Volumes ==
- City of Pearl (2004)
- Crossing the Line (2005)
- The World Before (2005)
- Matriarch (2006)
- Ally (formerly Task Force) (2007)
- Judge (2008)

== Featured alien species ==
- Bezeri: first seen in City of Pearl. The bezeri are native to the planet Bezer'ej in the Cavanagh's Star system. They are aquatic creatures whom humans liken to squid. They communicate primarily by bioluminescence. Living underwater and thus without access to fire, their technology is at the Neolithic level, although with some biotechnology based on selective breeding; the latter has allowed them to build "podships" for faster underwater travel, and for hurling small numbers of explorers out of the water to investigate (briefly) what they term the "Dry Above".
- Wess'har: first seen in City of Pearl. Humanoid in appearance, with heads that humans liken to seahorses and with distinctive four-lobed pupils. Their sense of smell is more acute than that of humans, and pheromonal signals play a greater role in their interactions. Their culture is matriarchal, with matriarchs establishing a hierarchy through emission of the jask pheromone. In their ethical system, motive is considered irrelevant when judging the rightness of actions; only outcomes are considered important. Ecological balance is a primary value of wess'har society; they take great pains to minimize their environmental footprint and do not consider sentient creatures to have more rights than nonsentient ones.

The wess'har that the Earth expedition first encounters have been living on Wess'ej, Bezer'ej's moon (itself a fully habitable world), for thousands of years, following the philosophy of the thinker Targassat, who believed in the supreme importance of non-intervention in the affairs of other species except in extreme cases. In The World Before they meet wess'har from Eqbas Vorhi ("The World Before"), the species' homeworld five light-years from Cavanagh's Star. The eqbas believe in unsolicited intervention to preserve planetary ecologies and have done so many times. They consider the Wess'ej wess'har to be agrarian primitivists, even though wess'har technology is fantastically advanced compared to humanity's.
Isenj: first seen in City of Pearl. The isenj are native to the planet Umeh in the Cavanagh's Star system; they also live on Umeh's habitable moon Tasir Var, and once had colonies on Bezer'ej and possibly worlds in other star systems. Humans liken them to spiders, although they have more than eight legs, and their primeval ancestors appear to have occupied an ecological niche similar to that of termites on Earth. They possess a genetic memory which lets them remember the experiences of their ancestors, and which has profound effects on their psychology and culture. Talented engineers, the isenj have constructed an interstellar instantaneous communication network, based on quantum mechanical principles, which humans refer to as "ITX". They are either unable or unwilling to control their population growth, to the extent that at the time of the novels, Umeh's land area has been completely urbanized with the only other life present on the planet being food organisms grown industrially.
Ussissi: first seen in City of Pearl. The ussissi co-evolved with the wess'har on Eqbas Vorhi and expanded into space with them. Humans liken them to meerkats or ferrets in appearance. The ussissi play many support roles in both wess'har cultures and are especially valued as interpreters, as they are talented mimics of alien sounds and excel at learning languages. In the Cavanagh's Star system the ussissi pilot spacecraft between the inhabited worlds, and also between Umeh's continents and Tasir Var.
Skavu: first seen in Ally. The skavu are native to the planet Garav, about four light-months away from Cavanagh's Star. Garav was the subject of a rather bloody eqbas ecological intervention, and the surviving skavu are fanatical about preserving ecological balance to the point of cheerfully slaughtering entire populations to bring it about. Humanoid in form, humans liken their features to a mix of iguanas and seals.
C'naatat: first seen in City of Pearl. C'naatat is a microscopic organism native to Bezer'ej, which, when it infects other species, forms a symbiotic relationship that grants many powerful traits to the host organism: aging stops, wounds heal very quickly, and adaptation to many different extreme environments becomes possible. This results in the host being virtually immortal and unkillable except by being blown to pieces with explosives. C'naatat strains can transfer biological traits of the organisms they have passed through to their new hosts (for example, granting the ability to emit wess'har pheromones, bezeri bioluminescence, or a shared memory like that of the isenj). The organism is also able to defend itself from attempts to remove it from a host – it improvises countermeasures that render the removal attempt ineffective.
