= Clone trooper =

Fictional class of soldiers in the Star Wars series

Clone troopers
- Star Wars characters
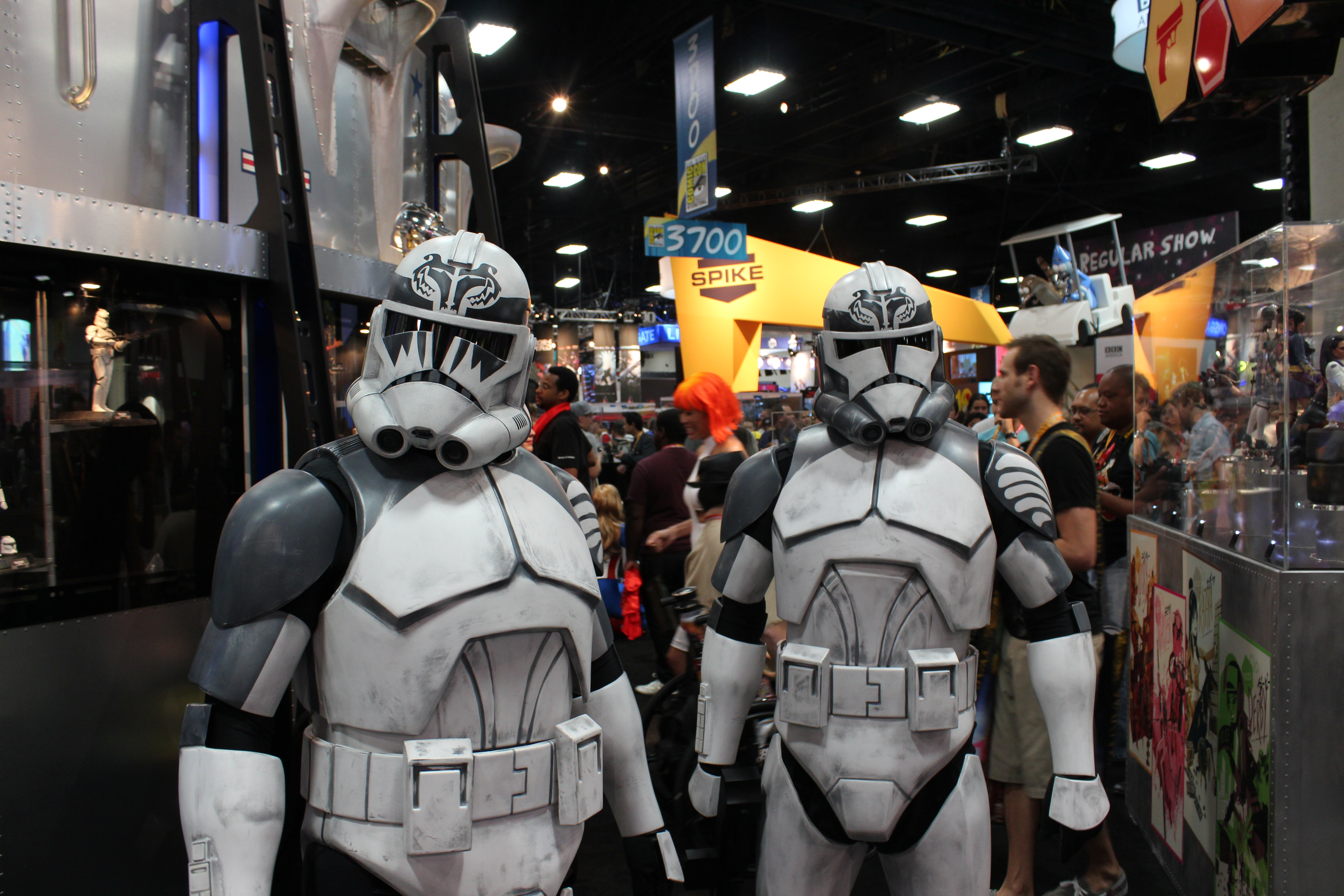
- 104th Battalion Clone Troopers cosplay at San Diego Comic-Con 2012
- First appearance: Attack of the Clones (2002)
- Created by: George Lucas
- Portrayed by: Daniel Logan (Episode II, young); Temuera Morrison (Episode II–III, Obi-Wan Kenobi); Bodie Taylor (Episode II–III, young adult)
- Voiced by: Temuera Morrison (Episode II–III, The Book of Boba Fett, The Mandalorian, Ahsoka); Dee Bradley Baker (The Clone Wars film and TV series, Rebels, The Bad Batch, Tales of the Jedi, various video games); Daniel Logan (The Clone Wars TV series: "Death Trap" (2010) and "ARC Troopers" (2010); young); André Sogliuzzo (Star Wars: Clone Wars)

In-universe information
- Nickname: "Regs" (by Clone Force 99)
- Species: Human (cloned)
- Gender: Male
- Occupation: Soldiers; Security guards
- Affiliation: Galactic Republic; Galactic Empire
- Origin: Kamino

Clone troopers are fictional soldiers from the Star Wars franchise created by George Lucas. First introduced in the film Star Wars: Episode II – Attack of the Clones (2002), they have since appeared in various other Star Wars media, including Star Wars: Episode III – Revenge of the Sith (2005) and the animated series Star Wars: The Clone Wars (2008–2014; 2020), Star Wars Rebels (2014–2018), Star Wars: The Bad Batch (2021–2024), and Tales of the Jedi (2022–present) as well as comics, novels, and video games set in both the Star Wars Legends expanded universe and the current canon.

In the Star Wars universe, all clone troopers are identical, artificially produced soldiers, created at secret cloning facilities on the planet Kamino from the DNA of bounty hunter Jango Fett to serve as the military of the Galactic Republic during the Clone Wars, which takes its name from the troopers. The clones are genetically engineered to age at twice the rate of a normal human to be ready for deployment quicker, and be unquestioningly loyal. They are trained for war from birth, receiving an education focused on martial theory and participating in combat simulations from a young age. During the Clone Wars, the clone troopers serve under the command of the Jedi Order and fight against the droid armies of the Confederacy of Independent Systems (CIS), a movement organized by numerous planets that sought to secede from the Republic. At the end of the war, Sheev Palpatine, the Republic's Supreme Chancellor and secretly a Sith Lord who orchestrated the conflict to gain political power, issues Order 66, which brands the Jedi as traitors and forcibly compels the clone troopers, under the control of inhibitor chips implanted in their brains, to execute them. After the formation of the Galactic Empire and the destruction of the cloning facilities on Kamino, the remaining clone troopers briefly serve as the Empire's military before being phased out in favor of the stormtroopers, natural-born human recruits.

During the development of The Empire Strikes Back, Lucas initially conceived a planet inhabited by clones, which is why the Clone Wars was mentioned for the first time in the original Star Wars film. The clone trooper armor was designed to suggest a design lineage with the stormtroopers of the original trilogy, and it incorporated features from both the armor of stormtroopers and Boba Fett, revealed in Attack of the Clones to be an unaltered clone of Jango Fett. The armored troopers in Attack of the Clones and Revenge of the Sith are computer-generated images voiced by Temuera Morrison, who portrayed Jango. Younger clones were played by Bodie Taylor and Daniel Logan, who portrayed the younger Boba. Clones not wearing helmets were played by both Morrison and Taylor, who wore chroma key body suits to isolate their heads, and some clone troopers featured a blend of the actors' features. Beginning with The Clone Wars film that launched the animated series of the same name, adult clone troopers are voiced by Dee Bradley Baker and young clone troopers are voiced by Logan. In Star Wars: Clone Wars (2003–2005), all clones were voiced by André Sogliuzzo.

Upon their debut in the Star Wars prequel trilogy, clone troopers received a mixed response from critics and audiences due to their limited screen time and the films never explicitly stating that they were distinct from the original trilogy's stormtroopers; some felt that the implication of stormtroopers being soldiers created solely for war took away from the impact of the conflict. Reception of the clone troopers improved significantly with their portrayal in The Clone Wars, which introduced numerous clones with distinctive personalities and made an effort to humanize them, exploring their relationships with the Jedi and fellow clones and their thoughts and feelings about the Clone Wars and their own existence. Since then, numerous Star Wars works set during the Clone Wars era have featured clone troopers as main characters, with many going on to become fan favorites. Clone troopers have become cultural icons, and a widely recognized element of the Star Wars franchise.

== Concept and creation ==
=== Development and design ===
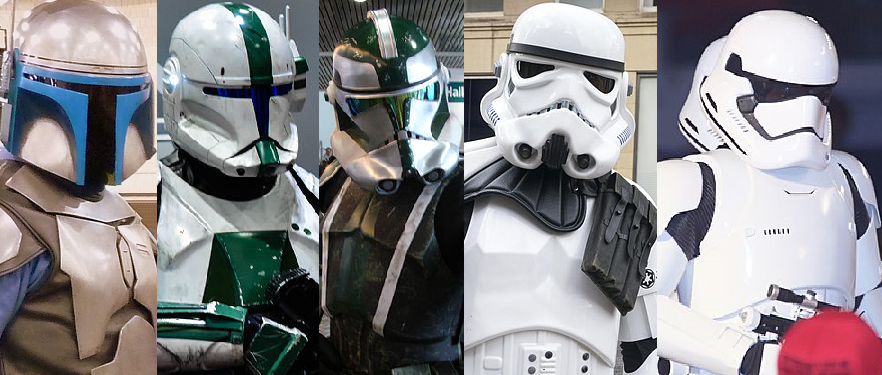
Evolution of clone trooper & stormtrooper armour, illustrated by cosplayers. Left to right: 1. Modern Mandalorian (Jango Fett); 2. Phase I clone commando (Fixer); 3. Phase II clone trooper (Commander Gree); 4. Imperial stormtrooper sergeant; 5. First Order stormtrooper

In writing The Empire Strikes Back, Leigh Brackett's first draft of the film initially developed Lando Calrissian as a clone from a planet of clones involved in the Clone Wars mentioned in A New Hope, who were nearly made extinct by the war, but this concept was not featured in the final film. George Lucas later came up with the alternate concept of an army of clone shock troops from a remote planet used by the Republic in the war that followed. Lucas intended for the prequel trilogy to depict the evolution of the galaxy's fighting forces, and the clone troopers were the step after flawed battle droids.

Clone troopers were designed to strongly suggest the army's evolution into the Empire's stormtrooper army. Concept artist Jay Shuster said of the armor design, "It follows the formula for a lot of the prequel trilogy. Take something pre-conceived in the existing trilogy and de-generate it." Design Director Doug Chiang incorporated both features of the Boba Fett and stormtrooper armor into the design, acknowledging the "vague assertion in Star Wars lore" that Fett's armor was connected to those of the stormtroopers. Initial concept models implied that the first generation armor was thicker and bulkier than stormtrooper armor, and this characteristic was retained by the art department for Revenge of the Sith. Lucas expressed a desire for individualized trooper armor from the beginning of art development for Revenge of the Sith. Several variations were largely dictated by environmental needs, but others were influenced of the 2003 Clone Wars animated series and the desert stormtroopers of A New Hope. The clone trooper designs "progressed" closer toward the stormtrooper designs, and the film included variant designs similar to the sandtrooper, scout trooper, and snowtrooper armor of the original trilogy.

The designs of clone trooper in snow and cold weather gear, seen in season one of The Clone Wars, are heavily inspired by early concept and costume by Ralph McQuarrie, Joe Johnston, and John Mollo for The Empire Strikes Back.

=== Portrayal ===
In Attack of the Clones and Revenge of the Sith, all clone troopers are computer-generated images and are voiced by Temuera Morrison, who played the clone template Jango Fett. The child clone troopers were played by Daniel Logan, who also played Jango's clone son Boba Fett, and the clone troopers as young men were played by Bodie Taylor, who was cast for his resemblance to a younger Morrison. Taylor was filmed multiple times and composited to fill out crowded shots set in Tipoca City, and in some cases he was entirely digital.

Commander Cody, seen in armor without his helmet in Revenge of the Sith, was played by Morrison. He wore a blue bodysuit and only footage of his head was used for Cody; he held a stormtrooper helmet to approximate the digital clone trooper helmet Cody carries. Like Morrison, Taylor also played armored and clones without helmets in Revenge of the Sith, wearing a blue bodysuit that isolated his head. Some clone troopers were entirely digital and featured a digital blend of Morrison's and Taylor's facial features. The armor was match-animated to the actors' bodies.

The clone troopers are voiced by Dee Bradley Baker in the 2008 animated film The Clone Wars and its related animated television series of the same name. Baker attempted to give each clone trooper a unique voice, taking into account personality, age, and position within the unit, sometimes describing the clone in a single adjective and focusing on that descriptor for the voice work. Each clone was voiced individually, with all the clone's lines for the episode recorded at one time before moving to another character, and the dialogue was edited together.

Logan voiced the young clone troopers in seasons two and three of the 2008 television series. Baker reprises his role in the 2014 Rebels and 2021 The Bad Batch animated series.

== Appearances ==
=== Film ===
In Attack of the Clones (2002), Jedi Master Obi-Wan Kenobi discovers the clone army on Kamino. He is told by the Kaminoans that Jedi Master Sifo-Dyas ordered the army on the Republic's behalf ten years prior; however, Sifo-Dyas' apparent death shortly before that timeframe leads the Jedi Order to doubt this. The clone troopers are cloned from Jango Fett, a bounty hunter hired by a man named Tyranus, later revealed to be Sith Lord Count Dooku. The clone troopers' genetics are altered so that they age at twice the normal rate and are more loyal and easier to command. The clone army is deployed to Geonosis under the command of the Jedi to rescue Obi-Wan, Anakin Skywalker, and Padmé Amidala from execution by the Separatists. The ensuing battle becomes the first one in the Clone Wars. Although the clone army emerges victorious, Dooku and many other Separatist leaders escape, meaning that the war has only just begun.

In Revenge of the Sith (2005), set three years later, the clone army continues to fight in the Clone Wars against the Separatist battle droid armies. However, just as it appears that the Republic will win the war, Chancellor Palpatine, secretly the Sith Lord Darth Sidious, orders the clone army to execute Order 66, a command for the Clone Troopers to kill their Jedi Generals due to the latter being labeled as traitors to the Republic. Due to them being compelled to turn against the Jedi, The clone troopers betray and kill their Jedi commanders, although a few manage to escape. Meanwhile the 501st Legion, led by the newly christened Darth Vader, storms the Jedi Temple, burning it and killing the vast majority of the Jedi inside, effectively ending the Jedi Order. Following Vader's assassination of the remaining Separatist leaders, under the orders of Sidious, Palpatine transforms the Republic into the Galactic Empire and the clone army becomes the basis of the Imperial Army.

Clone troopers are referenced in The Force Awakens (2015) when Kylo Ren chides General Hux for the betrayal of rogue stormtrooper FN-2187 and suggests that Supreme Leader Snoke should consider a clone army.

=== Animation ===
==== The Clone Wars ====
Clone troopers are heavily featured in the 2008 animated film The Clone Wars, which spawned an animated series of the same name that lasted until 2014, with a final season released in 2020. Both the film and series are set between "Attack of the Clones" and "Revenge of the Sith". Many named clone troopers are introduced and given individual personalities, serving as the focus of several story arcs. During the 6th season, more of the nature of "Order 66" is revealed when a clone trooper named Fives discovers that he and his brothers have chips implanted into their brains that would compel them to kill Jedi when "Order 66" is uttered. Unfortunately, the Jedi remained unaware of this as Fives was executed by a clone shock trooper ordered by Palpatine to conceal the existence of the contingency order. When Order 66 is issued by Sidious during the series finale, the activated inhibitor chips forcibly brainwash the Clone Troopers into believing their Jedi generals as traitors to the Republic and subsequently executing them.

==== Rebels ====
The 2014 animated series Star Wars Rebels features a group of former clone troopers, including Rex from the preceding cartoon, who had their chips removed and therefore did not carry out Order 66. They are first introduced in the second season, set about 16 years after Revenge of the Sith. These clones help the crew of the Ghost in their fight against the Empire, and eventually join the Rebel Alliance. Rebels established that in the years after the Clone Wars, the Empire gradually replaced the aging clones with the less effective but more numerous stormtroopers. The clones were not purged, but simply cast aside over time, and without familial or social networks to fall back onto it was difficult for them to integrate into civilian life.

In a behind-the-scenes Q&A for episode 2.2, when asked what happened to the clone troopers after the Clone Wars ended, producer Pablo Hidalgo explained: "A lot of different things happened to them. Some of them had pretty sad situations. In many ways, the Clone Troopers are sort of this "Lost Generation" of unappreciated veterans who helped save the galaxy and were then discarded." He went on to explain that a small handful of clone troopers were kept in service as instructors at Imperial academies across the galaxy, training up the next generation of non-clone soldiers as the new stormtroopers.

==== The Bad Batch ====
The 2021 animated series Star Wars: The Bad Batch focuses on Clone Force 99, nicknamed "The Bad Batch", a squad of clone commandos with deliberately modified genetic traits granting them mildly superhuman abilities. The first season begins during Order 66 and its aftermath, as the Republic transitions into the Empire. Most of the squad evades the effects of Order 66 due to their unique genetic alterations that prevent their inhibitor chips from functioning, except for Crosshair, who is reprogrammed by Admiral Tarkin to serve the Empire. The Bad Batch also ends up taking in a young female clone named Omega, who is, like them, a genetic deviant and therefore feels a kinship with them.

In addition to Clone Force 99's exploits, the series explores the retirement of the clone army in favor of stormtroopers, who gradually replace them as the Empire's main military force. As explained by Tarkin in the first season, this decision stemmed from the fact that clone troopers were bred and trained for wartime combat, not pacification duty; as such, a vast army of human recruits would not only be more cost-efficient, but would allow the Empire to cover every corner of the galaxy and maintain order more effectively. In the second season, a defense recruitment bill enacts the permanent transition from clone troopers to stormtroopers, and much of the new Imperial personnel is shown taking a dislike to the remaining clones. Clone troopers themselves react negatively towards the change as they were created for combat but are now forced to defend isolated bases or retire indefinitely.

=== Video games ===
==== Star Wars: Republic Commando ====
The 2005 tactical first-person shooter game Star Wars: Republic Commando introduced a new variant of elite clone troopers called Clone Commandos. In the game, the player leads a team of commandos called Delta Squad who utilize advanced weapons, tactics, and equipment to accomplish missions for the Galactic Republic. The game garnered a cult following, and some consider it to be one of the best Star Wars video games ever made. Clone Commandos have appeared in other Star Wars video games and media as a result of the game's popularity, such as 2017's Star Wars Battlefront II.

==== Star Wars: Battlefront ====
Clone troopers are playable characters in both Pandemic Studios' and DICE's Battlefront series. The 2005 Battlefront II's single-player campaign follows the 501st Legion as they transition into serving the Galactic Empire. Clone troopers were not playable in DICE's 2015 Battlefront release, but were added to the 2017 sequel.

=== In other media ===
In the 2022 live-action series Obi-Wan Kenobi, the title character encounters a former clone trooper (played by Temuera Morrison) while walking through a city on the planet Daiyu. This unnamed clone has become a disheveled homeless veteran, reduced to begging on the streets a decade after the end of the Clone Wars.

In a flashback sequence during the first season of the live-action series Andor, a regiment of clone troopers is sent to enforce Imperial authority over the planet Ferrix, quelling angry protesters who are demanding the departure of the Imperials and the return of the former Galactic Republic.

In the novels Lords of the Sith by Paul S. Kemp and Tarkin by James Luceno, several clone troopers are still in active service during the early years of the Empire's reign, such as among stormtroopers serving under Darth Vader, and even among the Emperor's elite Imperial Guard.

== Squads ==
=== Delta Squad ===
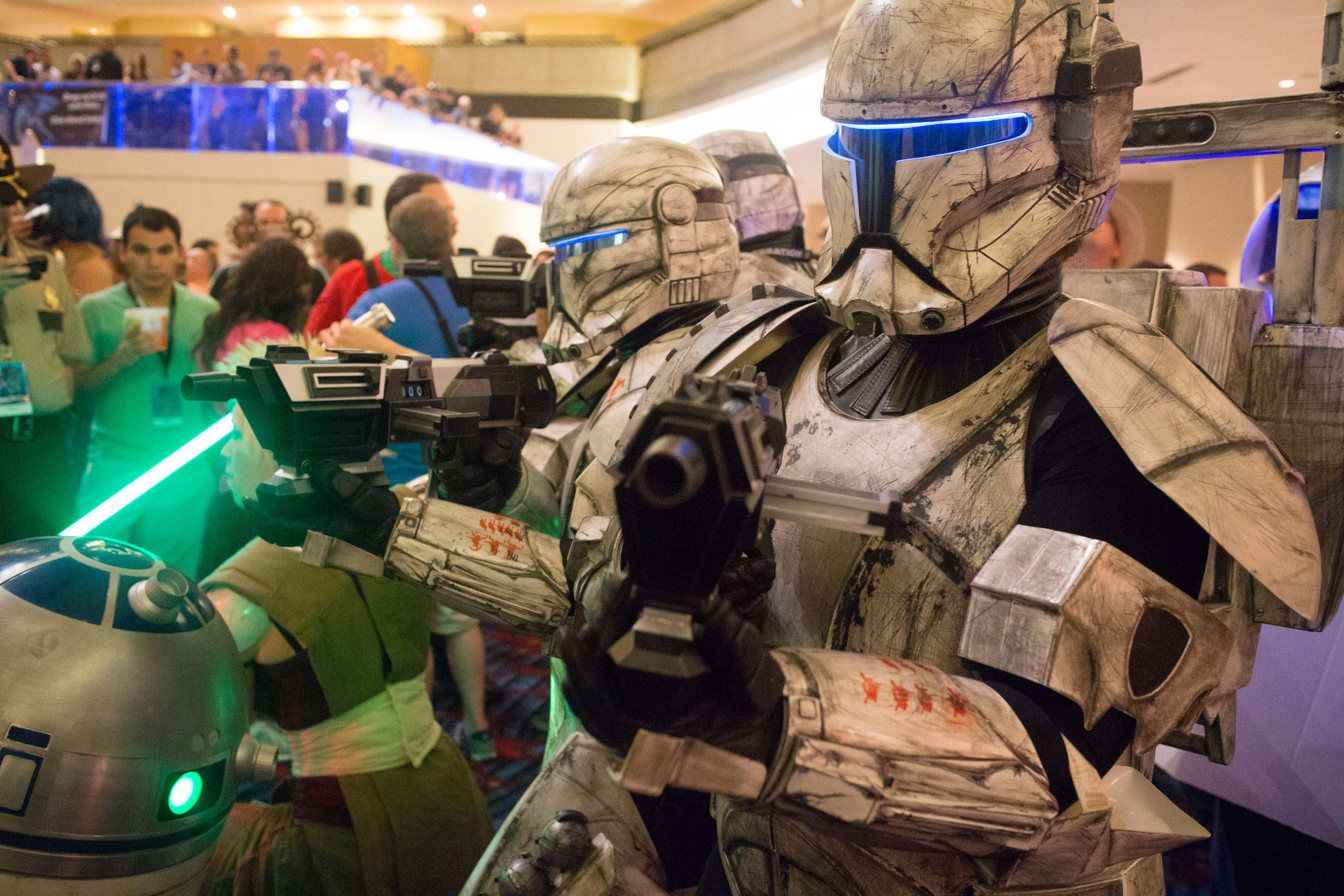
Clone Commandos cosplay

Delta Squad is a unit of four Republic commandos, a type of specialized clone trooper that wore katarn-type armor. The squad is introduced in the video game Star Wars: Republic Commando and featured throughout the Republic Commando novels by Karen Traviss, and its troopers make a brief appearance in The Clone Wars television series. Delta is led by Sergeant Boss, who is distinguished by orange markings on his armor, and he is voiced by Temuera Morrison. Scorch is the squad's demolitions expert and has a jocular sense of humor; he is distinguished by yellow and gray markings on his armor, and he is voiced by Raphael Sbarge. Sev is the group's sniper and is characterized as grim. During a mission on Kashyyyk at the end of the Clone Wars, depicted at the end of Republic Commando, Sev's transmission signal is lost, and he is declared missing in action; his ultimate fate is uncertain. Sev is distinguished by red markings on his armor, and he is voiced by Jonathan David Cook. Fixer is the hacker and technical expert and is characterized as distant and stern; he is distinguished by green markings on his armor, and he is voiced by Andrew Chaikin. In the television series The Bad Batch, Scorch (voiced by Dee Bradley Baker) makes occasional antagonistic appearances working for the Galactic Empire after Order 66.

=== Clone Force 99 ===
Clone Force 99—informally known as "the Bad Batch"—is a clone commando squad consisting of four (later five) clone troopers with unique genetic mutations that heighten specific skill sets, not possessed by other clones—the result of specially designed genetic experimentation. Named in honor of 99, a defective clone who died in defense of Kamino, the Bad Batch originally consisted of squad leader Clone Sergeant Hunter, a CQC specialist with enhanced sensory abilities and tracking skills; Tech, a security specialist with enhanced mental capacity and intelligence; Wrecker, a demolition and heavy ordnance specialist with enhanced muscular form; and Crosshair, a scout sniper specialist with genetically enhanced eyesight. The squad maintained an impressive 100% mission completion ratio, but were notorious for their insubordination and were known to get into fights with other troopers.

Clone Force 99 was introduced in the seventh season of The Clone Wars animated series, where they come to Anaxes to assist Anakin Skywalker and Rex on their mission to investigate a string of suspicious Separatist victories, as well as rescue Corporal Echo, the ARC Trooper who was presumed dead on Lola Sayu but was in truth captured by the Techno Union. After the successful mission, Echo decides to join Clone Force 99, becoming the squad's fifth member, as his transformation into a cyborg while in Separatist captivity led him to feel different from other clones.

In July 2020, it was announced that Clone Force 99 would be receiving their own spin-off series in 2021 on Disney+. Titled Star Wars: The Bad Batch, the series follows the squad's activities during the early years of the Galactic Empire, beginning concurrently with the events of Revenge of the Sith. Following the activation of Order 66, Clone Force 99 is left unaffected, as their genetic mutations damaged their inhibitor chips and allowed them to retain their free will. Only Crosshair is affected by the inhibitor chip and elects to remain with the Empire, while the rest of Clone Force 99 deserts and flees Kamino alongside Omega, a young female clone who is the last of the original series of clones that produced Boba Fett and a perfect genetic copy of Jango Fett.

== Individual clone troopers ==
=== Appo ===
Appo served in the 501st Legion under the command of Jedi General Anakin Skywalker. He first appears in Episode III: Revenge of the Sith, in which he and other members of the 501st carry out Order 66 and follow Anakin, now Darth Vader, in attacking the Jedi Temple on Coruscant. He stops Senator Bail Organa from entering the Temple. Appo later appears in season four of The Clone Wars television series as a sergeant in the 501st serving under clone Captain Rex. His armor bears blue markings. In The Clone Wars television series, his helmet is adorned with a white arrow in reference to Appa of the Avatar: The Last Airbender television series, on which The Clone Wars supervising director Dave Filoni worked and who, like the clone commander, is voiced by Dee Bradley Baker.

=== Bacara ===
Bacara was a Commander of the 21st Nova Corps under the command of Jedi General Ki-Adi-Mundi. Known for his aggressive tactics, Bacara led Republic forces against the Separatists during the Outer Rim Sieges, culminating in the assault on Mygeeto. He first appears in Episode III: Revenge of the Sith, in which he and his men carry out Order 66 and shoot Ki-Adi-Mundi, killing him while on Mygeeto.

=== Bly ===
Bly was a Marshal Commander who led the 327th Star Corps under the command of Jedi General Aayla Secura. He first appears in Episode III: Revenge of the Sith, in which he and his men carry out Order 66 and shoot Aayla in the back, killing her. He later appears in season one of The Clone Wars television series alongside Aayla. Bly is distinguished by his close-shaved hair and yellow rectangular tattoos on his cheeks. His armor bears yellow markings, and he wears a yellow pauldron on his left shoulder, a kilt-like kama, and binocular attachments on his helmet. He is known as a dependable soldier who greatly values the success of the mission, and he has a "close working relationship" with Aayla and respects her dedication to achieving her objectives.

=== Cody ===
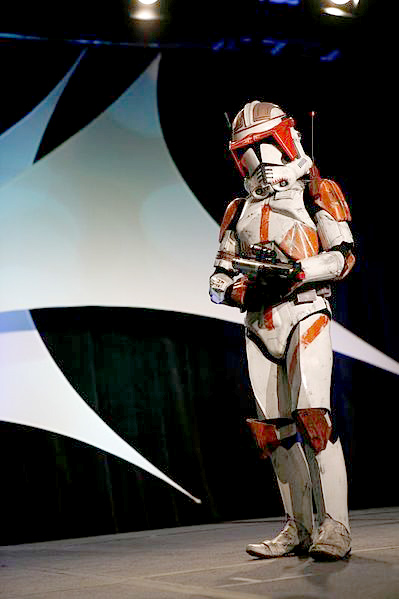
Commander Cody (Phase II armor) cosplay

Cody was a Marshal Commander who led the 212th Attack Battalion under the command of Jedi General Obi-Wan Kenobi. He first appears in Episode III: Revenge of the Sith during the Battle of Utapau, aiding Obi-Wan against General Grievous on the planet Utapau. He is the first clone trooper to receive Order 66 on-screen, and he obediently commands his troopers to shoot down Obi-Wan and to locate his body to confirm the kill. Cody later appears in The Clone Wars film and its related television series, as well as in season 2 of Star Wars: The Bad Batch.

Cody is distinguished by a scar on the left side of his face. His armor bears orange markings, and he wears visors on his helmets. He is characterized as a cautious but "natural and practical leader" whose "keen ability to strategize, combined with his fierce combat style in the heat of battle, earned him the respect of the Jedi, and of his fellow clones". He is also noted to adhere to standard procedures and protocol. Cody is particularly loyal to Obi-Wan, whom he complemented well, and their relationship is characterized by a mutual camaraderie and trust, though this did not prevent Cody from attempting to kill Kenobi as part of Order 66. Cody is also friends with Captain Rex, having completed many missions together.

=== Dogma ===
Dogma was part of the 501st legion under Captain Rex. He served in the Umbara campaign. When Jedi General Pong Krell arrived at the battle and started putting clone lives in needless danger, most of the clones were quick to raise their concerns. Dogma remained loyal to Krell's authority, calling his fellow clones traitors for questioning the commands of their superior. However, when Krell was revealed to be a traitor, Dogma overcame his blind loyalty, became devastated, and was the clone who pulled the trigger and ended the rogue Jedi's deceit permanently when Rex hesitated to do it himself. Even though Dogma was arrested for killing a Jedi, Rex gave him a reassuring nod to let him know that he did the right thing in doing so since the Jedi he killed was a traitor.

Dogma's armor featured the blue markings common to the 501st, as well as an upside-down red triangle with a v-shaped tattoo (which was blue) below on his helmet; the latter nearly matched a tattoo (which was black) that was mostly on the left side of his face.

=== Echo ===
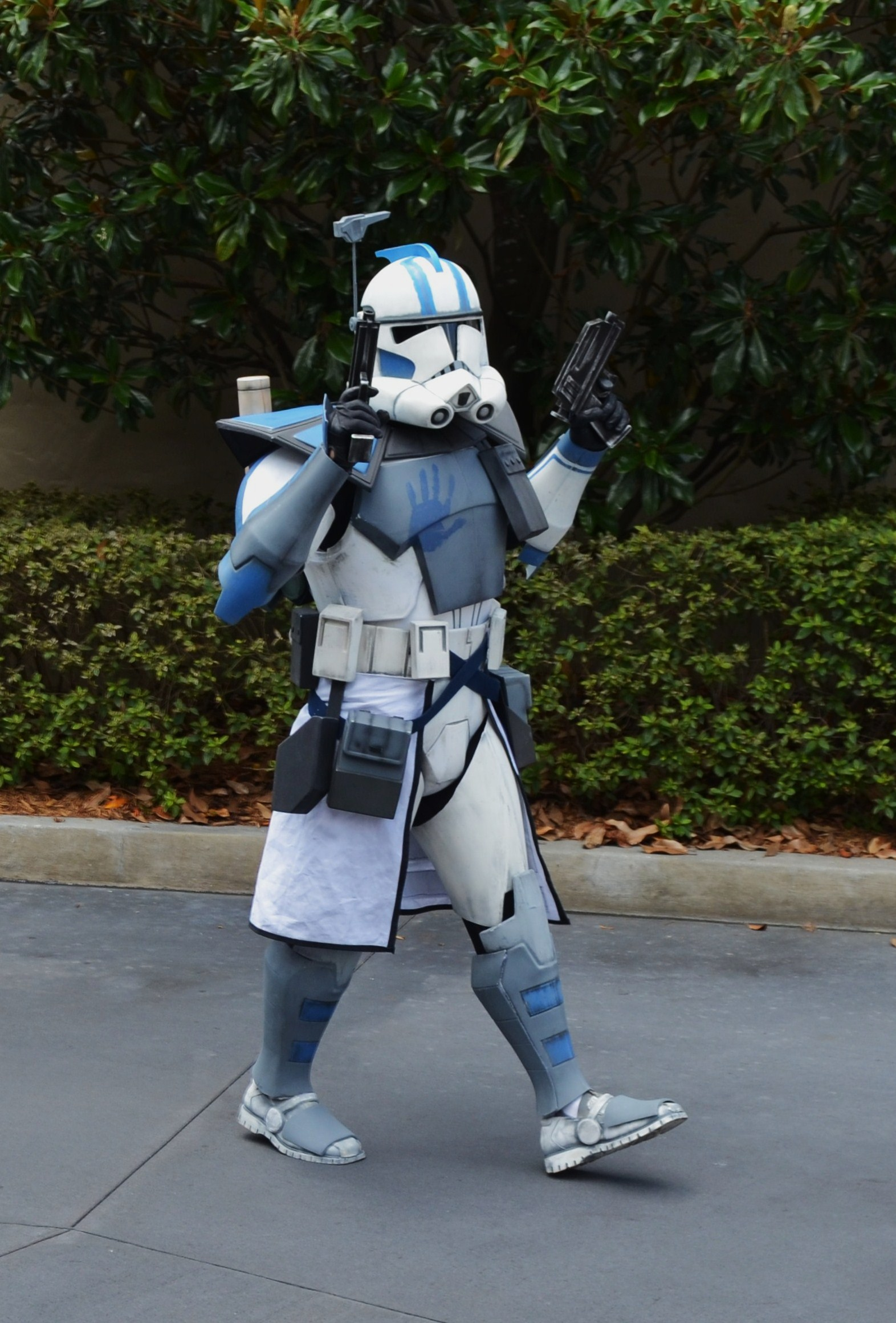
Corporal Echo cosplay

Echo was an ARC Trooper and corporal who served alongside fellow ARC Trooper Fives. He first appears in The Clone Wars season one episode "Rookies" as a regular trooper. He and his unit are assigned to the remote listening outpost on Rishi that is invaded by Separatist droids. Though the invasion is successfully repelled, only Echo and Fives survive, and they are reassigned to the 501st Legion. The season three episode "Clone Cadets" depicts Echo and his unit as cadets in training on Kamino. The unit, called Domino Squad, is initially unable to work together to pass their final test. Echo and Fives feel weighed down by the others in the squad and ask to be reassigned, but the request is denied. Under the advice of Jedi General Shaak Ti, Echo and Fives recommit themselves to Domino, and the squad is able to pass. Echo and Fives are eventually promoted to ARC Troopers together for their actions while defending Kamino and continue serving with the 501st. Echo is apparently killed in an explosion during a rescue operation in the season three episode "Counter Attack".

Story reels for a previously unfinished four-episode arc called "Bad Batch" (eventually released on Disney+ as part of the series' seventh season) revealed that Echo survived and was captured by the Separatists. He was modified into a cyborg able to communicate directly to computers and tasked with decoding the Republic strategy algorithm. Echo is rescued by Captain Rex, and with his ability to understand Separatist transmissions, he plays a key role in the Battle of Anaxes, earning a victory against the Separatists, the title of "Hero of Anaxes", and a promotion to corporal. After the mission, Echo decides to join Clone Force 99, a squad of four genetically enhanced clones, staying with them beyond the end of the Clone Wars.

Echo would subsequently become a main character in the sequel series, The Bad Batch, where his cybernetic modifications allow him to retain his free will after the activation of Order 66. Alongside the rest of Clone Force 99, who were similarly unaffected due to their damaged inhibitor chips, he defects from the Galactic Empire and becomes a fugitive. Together, the squad looks after Omega, a young female clone they rescued from Kamino, while taking jobs as mercenaries to sustain themselves. Echo would eventually leave Clone Force 99 in the second season episode "Truth and Consequences" to help Rex secure a better future for clones after they were phased out by the Empire in favor of stormtroopers. He rejoins the squad in the third and final season, helping them destroy the Empire's "Project Necromancer" before leaving once again to resume his efforts aiding other clones.

Echo's armor bears blue markings, and a blue handprint adorns his chest-plate, created when Rex touched it while covered in eel blood during Echo's first mission. After his promotion to ARC trooper, Echo also wears light gray pauldrons on his shoulders and a kilt-like kama painted in an asymmetrical white and blue design. Later, after his rescue from Separatist capture, he is visibly a cyborg, with various apparatus protruding from his head and a droid plug in place of his right hand; post-rescue, he takes to wearing what appears to be a stripped-down variant on standard Phase II armor. Throughout his appearances, he is characterized as one who strictly follows orders, regulations, and protocol. Echo's name is given to him by Domino Squad on Kamino as a sarcastic reference to his tendency to immediately repeat orders, even if his squad already heard.

=== Fives ===
Fives was an ARC Trooper who served alongside Corporal and fellow ARC Trooper Echo. He first appears in The Clone Wars season one episode "Rookies" as a regular trooper. He and his unit are assigned to a remote listening outpost that is invaded by Separatist droids. Though the invasion is successfully repelled, only Fives and Echo survive, and they are reassigned to the 501st Legion. The season three episode "Clone Cadets" depicts Fives and his unit as cadets in training on Kamino. The unit, called Domino Squad, consists also of cadets Cutup, Droidbait, and Hevy. They are initially unable to work together to pass their final test. Fives and Echo feel weighed down by the others in the squad and ask to be reassigned, but the request is denied. Under the advice of Jedi General Shaak Ti, Fives and Echo recommit themselves to Domino, and the squad is able to pass. Fives and Echo are eventually promoted to ARC troopers together for their actions while defending Kamino and continue serving with the 501st. When assigned to the command of Jedi General Pong Krell during the campaign on Umbara, Fives finds Krell's disregard for clone trooper lives appalling and openly disagrees with Krell and with Captain Rex, who is insistent on following orders. After discovering how to pilot Umbaran fighters, Fives, along with fellow clones Jesse and Hardcase disobey direct orders and destroy Umbaran supply ships delivering arms to the Umbaran Capital using the starfighters, with Hardcase sacrificing himself in the process. Though their actions allow a Republic victory, Krell, without process of a court-martial, finds Fives and Jesse guilty of treason and sentences them to execution by firing squad. However, Fives urges his fellow troopers to see this as an injustice, and the firing squad refuses to execute him. After Krell is ousted as a Republic Traitor, Fives is freed from custody and aids Rex and the 501st in arresting Krell, with clone trooper Dogma eventually using Fives' blaster to execute Krell.

In season six, during a battle over Ringo Vinda, Fives and the 501st are winning the battle until fellow clone Tup mysteriously executes Jedi General Tiplar, forcing the 501st to retreat. After rescuing Tup from Separatists and delivering him to Kamino for a medical investigation, Fives discovers a mysterious tumour in Tup's head before the latter dies. After realising the Kaminoans intend to wipe his mind, Fives launches his own investigation and realises the "tumour" in Tup's head is an inhibitor chip implanted in every clone from a young stage. Jedi Master Shaak Ti brings him to inform Palpatine about the chips, where Palpatine, being the true mastermind behind the conspiracy, reveals the chips' true purpose to Fives. He frames Fives for an assassination attempt, initiating a manhunt for Fives. With the help of 501st medic Kix, Fives is able to contact Rex and Anakin Skywalker, and he attempts to warn them of the conspiracy and of Palpatine's involvement. He is ultimately killed by Commander Fox of the Coruscant Guard and dies in Rex's arms.

Fives' name is derived from his designation number (CT-27-5555), which features fives in sequence. He is distinguished by a goatee and a stylized numeral five tattoo on his right temple. His armor bears blue markings, and a stylized worm creature adorns his helmets; after his promotion to ARC trooper, he also wears light gray pauldrons on his shoulders and kilt-like kama painted with blue stripes. He regards duty and honor above orders and protocol, feeling that there is no honor in following foolish orders and marching to his death. He insists that clone troopers be referred to by name, not number, and that they are soldiers, not units, and should be treated as such. He is a close friend of Rex and, after the apparent death of Echo, considers his best friend to be fellow trooper Tup, who aids Fives against Krell and is one of the first to refuse executing Fives when given the order by Krell. When Tup begins behaving abnormally due to his inhibitor chip malfunctioning, Fives goes to great lengths and disregards order to attempt to save Tup's life and, later, discover the true cause of Tup's death. With his dying words, he describes attempting to expose the conspiracy to have been his duty.

=== Fox ===
Fox was a Marshal Commander who led the Coruscant Guard, an elite clone trooper unit assigned to serve as peace-keepers on the Galactic Republic capital. Following the Battle on Teth, Fox's squad rescued Senator Padmé Amidala from Ziro the Hutt. Fox stormed Ziro's Palace, took out his battle droids, and freed Amidala. Ziro was taken to the Republic Judiciary Central Detention Center. When Cad Bane entered the Senate building and held a number of Senators and the Supreme Chancellor hostage, Fox led a company of the Coruscant Guard to cut off his escape. Unfortunately, Bane had rigged the chamber and the hostages with explosives. Seeing this, Fox ordered his men to stand down and allowed the bounty hunter and his team to leave the Senate building.

Like every other clone trooper in the Guard, Fox was bound by honor and duty to protect and serve the Supreme Chancellor and the members of the Galactic Senate. Utterly fearless, he was always the first to lead the charge into battle, even in the most perilous combat situations. His unquestionable loyalty meant he would carry out his orders without question, even if it meant killing a Jedi or another "brother". An example of this devotion to orders is seen as he shot ARC Trooper "Fives" with his DC-17. His exemplary performance has made him one of the most highly decorated soldiers in the Republic army. Additional sources state that Fox continued his duty on Coruscant, until an error on his part led Darth Vader to execute him by force snapping his neck.

=== Gree ===
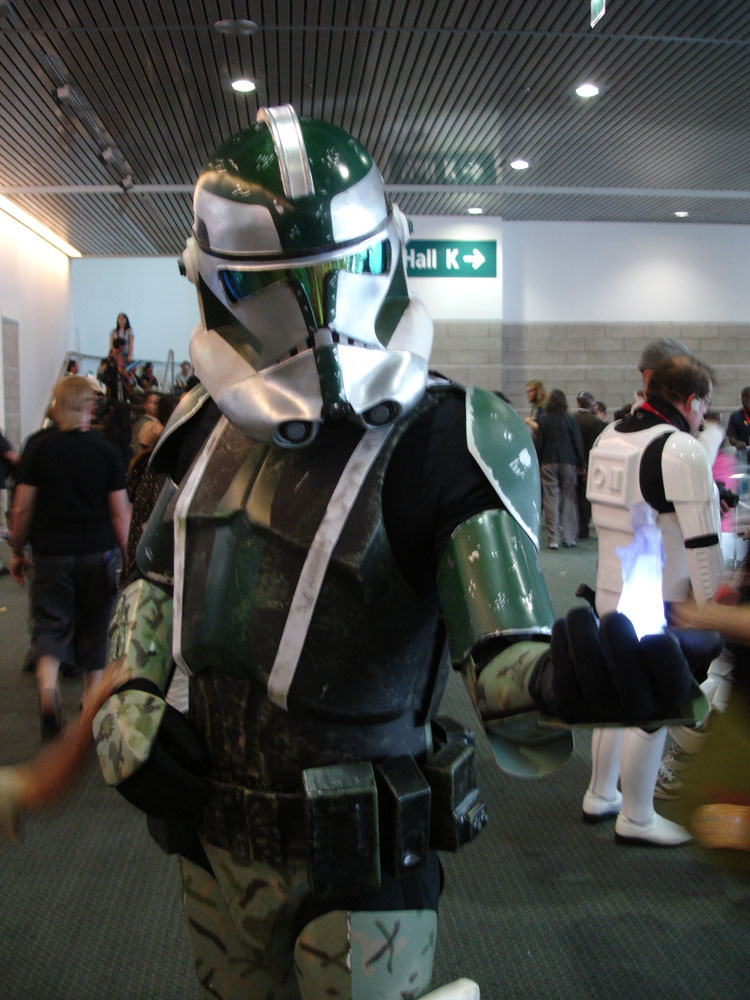
Commander Gree (Phase II armor) cosplay

Commander Gree was a Commander who led the 41st Elite Corps under the command of Jedi General Luminara Unduli. He first appears in Episode III: Revenge of the Sith aiding Jedi General Yoda on Kashyyyk, to defend the Wookiees from invading Separatists. He attempts to carry out Order 66, but he and another Kashyyyk scout trooper, Captain Jek, are beheaded by Yoda. He later appears in the first and second seasons of The Clone Wars television series serving under Luminara. Gree is distinguished by his dyed red hair shaved into two parallel stripes, in remembrance of fallen clones during his first battle, and eyebrows dyed to match his hair. His armor bears green markings, and he appears in green camouflage armor in Revenge of the Sith.

=== Gregor ===
Gregor was the Captain of Foxtrot Group, an elite commando unit within the Special Operations Brigade of the Grand Army of the Republic, attached in direct support to the 212th Attack Battalion. He is introduced in the season five episode "Missing in Action"—suffering amnesia and living on the distant planet Abafar, where a stranded D-Squad—a Republic covert-ops unit consisting of droids looking for a Separatist decoding chip—discovers him working as a dishwasher in a diner. It is revealed that he lost his memories and sense of identity after a shuttle crash during the devastating Battle of Sarrish. He was rescued by his employer, who keeps Gregor's true identity from him to prevent him from leaving, but Gregor is able to regain his sense of duty and his armor to help the Republic. Gregor holds off Separatist droids to allow the Republic mission to escape, and despite his promise to make his way home, he is seemingly killed in an explosion of rhydonium. He later appears in Star Wars, the Bad Batch where he has run away from the Empire. The Bad Batch is asked by Rex to rescue him, and they obey. He is rescued and taken to CID while the Bad Batch goes to rescue Hunter. He later appears in the Rebels television series, set fourteen years after Revenge of the Sith. He is revealed to have removed his inhibitor chip, preventing him from carrying out Order 66. Now a much older man because of his accelerated aging, he lives on the wasteland planet Seelos and hunts worm-like joopa with Captain Rex and Commander Wolffe. Sometime after the Clone Wars, he suffered a brain injury, causing him to suffer brief periods of apparent insanity. When the Spectres, a team of rebels from the planet Lothal, arrive on Seelos to ask for help, Gregor initially declines, but eventually assists them in fending off an Imperial attack after Wolffe inadvertently exposes them to the Empire. He later took part in a final battle to free Lothal from Imperial control, where he was fatally wounded by an Imperial technician.

Gregor's commando armor bears yellow markings and an off-white camouflage pattern, and his helmet is adorned with hash-marks modeled after those on Gerry Cheevers' hockey mask.

=== Jesse ===
Jesse was a member in the 501st Legion. In season four's Battle of Umbara, Jesse, like Fives comes to consider General Pong Krell to be ruthless and reckless (mainly over the casualty numbers). He later helps Fives and Hardcase on a rogue mission to destroy a Separatist supply ship, which succeeds at the cost of Hardcase's life. In season seven, he has become a lieutenant, ARC Trooper, and takes part in the Siege of Mandalore, during which he is captured and interrogated by Maul, and later attempts to execute Ahsoka Tano when Order 66 is issued. After Commander Rex has his chip removed and sides with Ahsoka, Jesse accuses him of treason and tries to kill him as well, but dies along with all the troopers aboard when the Venator-class Star Destroyer Tribunal they are on crashes on a small moon, and is buried by Ahsoka and Rex.

Jesse is distinguished by his shaved hair with the Republic symbol tattooed on most of his head. His armor bears blue markings with the Republic symbol on the center.

=== Kix ===
Kix was a medic serving in the 501st Legion. In season six, Kix aids Fives, a fugitive because he discovered the inhibitor chip conspiracy. The short story "The Crimson Corsair and the Lost Treasure of Count Dooku" reveals that this action prompted Count Dooku to capture Kix, who discovered the conspiracy himself by the time of his capture. With droids failing to secure a confession, Kix was frozen in stasis for delivery to Dooku. The ship crashed into a planet during a randomized hyperspace jump to escape a Republic attack and protect "Dooku's prize". Fifty years later during the war between the First Order and the Resistance, Kix is released from stasis by pirates searching for "the lost treasure of Count Dooku". Kix is taken aboard the Corsair's ship and welcomed to their endeavor of raiding forgotten Separatist bases.

Kix is distinguished by his shaved hair and a phrase translating to "a good droid is a dead one" tattooed across his head. His armor bears blue markings, and his Phase II armor bears a red insignia marking him as a medic. He is "dedicated to preserving the life of his brothers", and he even tells an injured Captain Rex, "As the team medic, when it comes to the health of the men, including you, I outrank everyone." However, he still has "no qualms about fighting the enemy".

=== Neyo ===
Neyo was a Marshal Commander who led the 91st Mobile Reconnaissance Corps, with initial-command given to Jedi General Mace Windu in the Battle of Ryloth and Battle of Anaxes; command was later transferred to Jedi Generals Adi Gallia and Stass Allie. Aside from BARC speeders, the corps utilized AT-AP walkers, and AT-RT walkers. The elite cavalry unit Lightning Squadron was part of the 91st Reconnaissance Corps. As the war with the Confederacy of Independent Systems progressed, in 20 BBY, the Republic Military formed a special covert-ops team of droids known as D-Squad which consisted of four astromech droids, R2-D2, QT-KT, U9-C4, M5-BZ, and Neyo's DUM-series pit droid, designated WAC-47, and was placed under the command of Colonel Meebur Gascon. D-Squad's primary objective was to infiltrate a Separatist Providence-class carrier/destroyer and steal an encryption module that was housed aboard, which was successful. Later, the commander attended a Republic strategy conference at the Valor space station located in the Carida system. During the conference, a Separatist attack on the station was thwarted by the members of D-Squad. Neyo and his troops were stationed on the Outer Rim world of Saleucami, under the command of Jedi General Stass Allie, in the waning days of the Clone Wars. While patrolling the planet's surface, he received a message from Supreme Chancellor Sheev Palpatine instructing him to execute Order 66. Neyo fired his BARC speeder's laser cannons on the general, adding Allie to the list of Jedi who perished. After the transformation of the Galactic Republic into the Galactic Empire, 91st Recon Corps was folded into the Imperial Army. Neyo had a specialized helmet similar to that of Commander Wolffe, and sported a sash on his armor, and a small, grey, shoulder pauldron over his right shoulder as well.

=== Ponds ===
Ponds was a Commander who led the 91st Mobile Reconnaissance Corps. During the Battle of Geonosis, Commander Ponds arranged for five special commando units to follow Windu's orders during the first battle of the war.

=== Rex ===
Rex was the Captain who led the 501st Legion, which was often under the command of Jedi General Anakin Skywalker and Jedi Commander Ahsoka Tano. He first appears with the rank of captain in The Clone Wars film and its related television series, and he is the primary recurring clone trooper protagonist of the series. In the seventh season of the series (which overlaps with Revenge of the Sith), Rex is promoted to commander and leads part of the 501st Legion, called the 332nd Company (Ahsoka's Clone Troopers) in the Siege of Mandalore alongside Ahsoka. When Order 66 is issued, he attempts to execute Ahsoka, but she removes his chip and restores his free will, causing him to be demoted to captain when he refuses to execute Ahsoka. Rex later appears in the Rebels television series, set fourteen years after Revenge of the Sith. Now a much older man because of his accelerated aging, he lives on the wasteland planet Seelos and hunted worm-like joopa with fellow clones Wolffe and Gregor before they are offered a place in the Rebel Alliance, which leads to Rex reuniting with Ahsoka. In the series' epilogue, it is mentioned that Rex fought in several battles throughout the Galactic Civil War, most notably the Battle of Endor as part of Han Solo's strike team.

=== Thire ===
Thire was a Lieutenant (Until Phase 2) Coruscant Guard clone shock trooper who served as a commander in the Coruscant Guard of the Grand Army of the Republic. During the Clone Wars, he accompanied Grand Master Yoda of the Jedi Order on a diplomatic assignment to meet with King Katuunko of Toydaria. In the course of their mission Yoda inspired his clone troopers to take strength from their individual traits, such as Thire's patience.

Following the initiation of Order 66 and the subsequent confrontation between Yoda and Darth Sidious in 19 BBY, Thire and his troopers were ordered to hunt the Jedi Master. The failure to locate his body convinced Mas Amedda that Yoda was still alive, leading the Emperor to order Thire to resume the search. However, Yoda succeeded in escaping from Coruscant with the aid of Senator Bail Organa. Thire later accompanied Sidious to Mustafar to recover the critically wounded Darth Vader.

=== Trick ===
Trick, formerly designated CT-3301, was a clone trooper who previously served under Republic captain Hawks until the disastrous Battle of Antine that cost them their career. He was previously slated for decommissioning (reassignment to a non-combat role on Kamino) due to a head injury that did not significantly impact his performance, but instead departed Republic service and joined Hawks in their mercenary group Zero Company. Despite his work with Zero Company, he remained loyal to the Republic and believed in its cause. He had a hostile relationship with Umbaran teammate Luco Bronc, who fought for the Separatist-aligned Umbaran Militia during the Umbaran Campaign. He loved games of chance to the point of having a gambling addiction but always kept himself out of debt. Prior to the reformation of the Galactic Republic into the Galactic Empire, Trick was visited by Stillwatch Batallion captain Corvo who activated his inhibitor chip by relaying Palpatine's orders; on the day of the establishment of the Empire, Trick turned on Zero Company, forcing them to subdue and place him in a coma for the next year. Hawks was contacted by Rex who aided in removing Trick's inhibitor chip and freeing him from his programming by having him sent to Clone Force 99 on Ord Mantell for surgery, after which he rejoined Zero Company in their fight against the Empire. While Zero Company continued to work with Rex in sabotaging Imperial black sites, he and Luco learned that a new type of inhibitor chip designed to exert complete control over clones was being tested on Umbarans as part of Project Blackstaff which was overseen by clone trooper CT-4646, who had his chip removed but remained loyal to the Empire out of his own free will. Trick executed him out of disgust and the realization that CT-4646 was acting entirely of his own accord. Afterwards, he developed a friendship with Luco over their mutual disgust of the project and their desire to see both clones and Umbarans spared from a similar fate.

Prior to departing the Republic military, he wore Phase I armor which was damaged with burn marks and its visor's right side shattered during the Antine campaign. He repaired and customized his armor to his liking while in Zero Company's service, while also using the DC-15 series of blasters as he did while serving the Republic. After being freed from his inhibitor chip, Trick wore Katarn-class commando armor and used a DC-17m Interchangeable Weapon System blaster rifle.

=== Tup ===
Tup was part of the 501st legion under Captain Rex. He served in the Umbara campaign and was key to the capture of treasonous Jedi General Pong Krell, supporting and siding with his friend Fives even after Fives had been condemned to death by Krell and stunning the Jedi after a fierce battle with mutinous 501st clones led by Rex. In the sixth season, Tup suffered a malfunction in a biotechnical chip implanted in his brain shortly after his creation by the Kaminoans. Intended to ensure that the clones obeyed Order 66, the chip caused Tup to shoot and kill Jedi General Tiplar despite not having been ordered to. As Tup was being shipped back to Kamino for evaluation, he was kidnapped by the Separatists (who wanted to know why his chip had malfunctioned), only to be recovered shortly afterwards. Tup's actions led to the discovery of the chips by both the Jedi and the clones themselves, but Tup died of medical complications soon afterwards. Though Fives attempted to avenge Tup's death by finding the truth behind the chips, he was killed by Commander Fox, before he could reveal what he had learned; Tup's actions and death were officially declared the results of a locally acquired virus.

Tup's armor featured the blue markings common in the 501st, as well as an image of a single blue teardrop underneath the right eye of his helmet; this matched a tattoo on his face.

=== Wolffe ===
Wolffe was a Commander who led the 104th Battalion under the command of Jedi General Plo Koon. He is introduced in The Clone Wars season one episode "Rising Malevolence". He is the first officer aboard Plo's flagship Triumphant when it is destroyed by General Grievous and is one of three clones to survive. Afterward, he appears with a redesigned character model, including a cybernetic eye implant caused by a fight with Separatist assassin Asajj Ventress, and leads a tight-knit unit nicknamed Wolfpack on the battlefield. He later appears in the Rebels television series, set fourteen years after Revenge of the Sith. Wolffe is revealed to have removed his inhibitor chip, preventing him from carrying out Order 66. Now a much older man because of his accelerated aging, he lives on the wasteland planet Seelos and hunts worm-like joopa with Rex and Gregor. When they are sought by the rebel protagonists, Wolffe is suspicious of their motives and contacts the Empire to protect himself, Rex, and Gregor. Rex convinces him that the rebels can be trusted, and Wolffe regrets his actions. He then thwarts an incoming attack from the Empire to save the rebels, and later on helps them free their planet from Imperial occupation once and for all.

Wolffe is distinguished by a scar running through his eye and a silver cybernetic eye implant. His armor is adorned with a gray stylized likeness of a wolf, and he wears a kilt-like kama. He is characterized as detail-oriented and as having "a sense of strategy superior to that of most clone officers, making him a highly effective complement to Plo." He is impatient with missions that send him away from the battlefield and becomes quickly exasperated with garrulous protocol droid C-3PO.

== See also ==
- Mandalorians
- Spartiate
