= Matriarch =

A matriarch is a woman in a position of authority or privilege, such as the leader of a family or an ethnic group.

Matriarch may also refer to:

== Sociology ==
- Matriarch (elder), social title or role
- Matriarchy, a social system in which positions of power and privilege are primarily held by women

== Arts and media ==
=== Film and television ===
- The Matriarch, a 2007 film directed by Markku Pölönen
- Matriarch (film), a 2022 film directed by Ben Steiner
- Matriarch Productions, a British film production company owned by married actors Stephen Graham and Hannah Walters
- Matriarcas (lit. 'Matriarchs'), a Chilean soap opera

=== Literature ===
- Matriarch (novel), by Karen Traviss

=== Music ===
- Matriarch (album), by Veil of Maya
- "Matriarch", a song by Arca from Sheep, 2015
- Matriarch Records, an American record label owned by Mary J. Blige

== Other ==
- Matriarchs (Bible), Biblical figures

== See also ==
- Matriarchal religion
