= Ally (novel) =

Book by Karen Traviss

- Ally
- Author: Karen Traviss
- Language: English
- Series: Wess'Har Series
- Genre: Science fiction
- Publisher: HarperCollins
- Publication date: March 2007
- Publication place: United States
- Media type: Print (Paperback)
- ISBN: 9780060882327
- OCLC: 93233810
- LC Class: CPB Box no. 2691 vol. 15
- Preceded by: Matriarch
- Followed by: Judge

Ally is a science fiction novel by British writer Karen Traviss, published in March 2007. It is the fifth book in the Wess'Har Series.

== Plot ==
The day of reckoning is rapidly approaching when the powerful Eqbas will remake the Earth at the expense of its dominant species. And Shan Frankland—once a police officer, once human, now something much more—must decide where her loyalties truly lie: among the gethes, on a planet she once called home, or here, where a dying species presents her with a new and unexpected crisis.

== Awards and nominations ==
Ally was a finalist for the 2008 Philip K. Dick Award.
