= Judge (novel) =

2008 novel by Karen Traviss

- Judge
- Author: Karen Traviss
- Language: English
- Series: Wess'Har Series
- Genre: Science fiction
- Publisher: HarperCollins
- Publication date: April 2008
- Publication place: United States
- Media type: Print (Paperback)
- Pages: 400
- ISBN: 978-0-06-088240-2
- OCLC: 156815092
- LC Class: CPB Box no. 2723 vol 8
- Preceded by: Ally

Judge is a science fiction novel by British writer Karen Traviss. It is the sixth and last book of the Wess'Har Series. It was nominated for the 2009 Philip K. Dick Award.

== Plot summary ==
The novel covers the arrival of the Eqbas Vorhi task force to start Earth's environmental restoration, with Shan Frankland, the Royal Marines squad, and Aras joining them. Australia agrees to host the eqbas, resulting in near war with other countries until the eqbas show their teeth. Shan's personal history as a police officer who covered up for eco-terrorists catches up with her, resulting in the death of one of the marines. Unknown to anyone else, eqbas commander Esganikan Gai has had herself inoculated with c'naatat, which almost results in disaster for the mission. Esganikan's successor sends the other c'naatat hosts back to Cavanagh's Star to end the risk of spreading it on Earth.

Journalist Eddie Michallat has elected to stay on Wess'ej to watch the wess'har matriarch Nevyan's stepdaughter Giyadas grow up because he too regards her as a surrogate daughter, and also to report on the ecological renaissance of the isenj homeworld Umeh as a role model for Earth. Because of the distance involved, Shan, Ade, and Aras return just in time to say goodbye before Eddie dies of old age. Meanwhile, eqbas biologist Da Shapakti has solved the problem of how to remove c'naatat from wess'har tissue as well (curing humans was solved previously). Shapakti and captured EU spy Mohan Rayat flee back to Wess'ej to prevent the eqbas leadership exploiting c'naatat to create immortal super-soldiers as the earlier Wess'har and Esganikan intended. Disgraced Marines officer Lindsay Neville has been trying to atone for her unintentional genocide by caring for the surviving bezeri for decades, to the point where she can no longer take human form; nevertheless she too finally agrees to be cured of c'naatat and become human again. Shapakti's cure also means that Shan's ménage à trois has to decide whether they will remain together, or let Aras go to fulfil his longing for life as a normal wess'har after centuries of loneliness.
