= The World Before (novel) =

2005 novel by Karen Traviss

- The World Before
- Author: Karen Traviss
- Language: English
- Series: Wess'Har Series
- Genre: Science fiction
- Publisher: HarperCollins
- Publication date: October 2005
- Publication place: United States
- Media type: Print (Paperback)
- Preceded by: Crossing the Line
- Followed by: Matriarch

The World Before is a science fiction novel by British writer Karen Traviss, published in October 2005. It is the third book in the Wess'Har Series.

== Plot summary ==
The Bezeri are no more. The effects of the cobalt-salted nuclear weapons have had devastating effects on their population and has wiped them out completely. Aras and the rest of the Wess'Har have a strong desire to see those responsible punished. They have already destroyed the Actaeon and its crew that refused to abandon ship. Those who did are now the occupants of the habitat called Umeh Station on the planet Umeh, as it is called by the Isenj who live there. Aras is battling his conflicting loyalties and genetics. Part of him wants to blame Bennett for Shan's death as he was involved and another part recognizes that Bennett now shares genes with himself and Shan. Aras and Bennett take a trip to the transplanted colony from Constantine, now called Mar'an'cas. Aras feels the need to see the Garrod family and see to the colony's well-being. He finds, unsurprisingly, that he is no longer welcome. They admit him as they do not have the force to stop him but they make their feelings clear.

Eddie Michallat is increasingly becoming more involved in the politics of the different worlds interacting. He is friends with the Isenj Minister Ual; who is finding that as he fights to preserve his world from the potential wrath of Eqbas Vorhi, so Umeh seems intent on its own destruction. He is inescapably bound to Wess'ej as tries to honor the memory of Shan Frankland and her sacrifices for everyone involved and his growing friendship with Aras, Bennett and the Wess'Har community. He still is a reporter at heart but that seems to be changing as his conscience affects his decisions for stories more and more. The information he provides now has the power to create war on Earth and the realization is sobering. Eddie decides to tell the real reasons for the destruction of Christopher, the death of Shan Frankland and also of the coming of the World Before and its possible ramifications, to the people of Earth. The Wess'Har have demanded the delivery of Mohan Rayat and Lindsay Neville. Minister Ual has been told by his government that they will only do so only if the Destroyer of Mjat (name given to Aras for the destruction of the Isenj city on Bezer'ej) is turned over to them. Ual, knowing that the Wess'Har do not negotiate, has decided to oppose his government by secretly allying with Eddie and the Royal Marines at Umeh Station to capture Neville and Rayat and turn them over to the Wess'Har. He knows this will be the end of his career and possibly his life but for the sake of Umeh, he feels he must do this.

The Wess'Har scouts have discovered the body of Shan Frankland. Nevyan takes a shuttle out to recover her body. To her surprise and astonishment, they discover, once her body is aboard, that Shan is still alive. She has been floating, frozen in the depths of space for months and her c'naatat has somehow kept her dormant but alive. Her body appears as a mummy; waxy and emaciated. They return to F'nar and reveal this to Bennett, Aras, Eddie, and the rest of the F'nar community. They immediately set about taking care of her to nurse her back to health. She does eventually recover enough to wake up.

Meanwhile, the World Before has come. A patrol ship lands and disgorges a crew of only males. They are the first ship and advise that another will be along as well. The Wess'Har do what they can to be accommodating but Nevyan does not like the way the Eqbas males seem interested in c'naatat. Eventually the second ship from Eqbas Vorhi arrives and it is massive. The ship itself rearranges and two smaller ships split off from it; one to reconnoiter Bezer'ej and the other for Umeh. The tension on Umeh heightens with this and the Isenj try to make the Wess'Har withdraw but to no avail.

Shan is filling out and getting stronger thanks to the care of Ade and Aras. She finds that she has feelings for both men and Aras, whose people practice polyandry, finds this acceptable and would like a house brother but fears that Shan will come to prefer Ade because of their shared homeworld. Ade is having a harder time contemplating a polyandric relationship but is coping as best he can. As Shan gets stronger she begins getting involved in the politics and the goings-on of F'nar. She also makes a trip to Bezer'ej to view the destruction and what the Eqbas are doing to repair the damage. While there, they discover that the blast did not destroy the c'naatat and that there are some survivors of Bezeri. The Bezeri only want to talk to Aras, though. When Aras journeys to the world, the Bezeri tell him that they want those responsible turned over to them for "balancing". Aras knows that the Bezeri would include the Royal Marines in their list of those responsible, so to protect Ade, Aras lies and says that it was just Neville and Rayat. The Bezeri also want Aras to come stay with them underwater to help them rebuild and recover what they've lost. Aras is torn by his duty to the Bezeri and his duty to stay with Shan and make her happy.

The Eqbas are moving right into their roles as peacekeepers and environmental control. They advise both Earth and Umeh to prepare for their coming and the changes that will entail. In the instance of Umeh, population control and environmental cleansing—and in the case of Earth, they plan to restore the plants and animals held in the gene bank; whether Earth likes it or not. They are also cleaning up the damage on Bezer'ej in record time. On Wess'Har, one Eqbas named Shapakti, is performing miracles. He has found a way to separate c'naatat from its human host, using sample tissue from Shan, but not from its wess'har host. He also started creating a jungle habitat using DNA and genomes from the gene bank.

Aras decides that he will go live with the Bezeri in spite of the pain it will cause him to be separated from Shan. Ade wants Shan to be happy and feels that he is in the way of Shan's and Aras' happiness so he decides to force Aras not to go. The solution presents itself in the form of Mohan Rayat and Lindsey Neville. Lindsey wants to redeem herself (and not die) and feels that the best way to accomplish this is to live underwater and serve the Bezeri. This would mean becoming infected with c'naatat. Ade agrees to this and infects both her and Rayat and send them to the depths with the Bezeri. Shan knows nothing of all this at this point and seems to finally accept her role as an isan to Ade and Aras in their polyandric relationship.
