= Star Wars: Republic Commando =

2005 video game

- Cover art featuring (from left to right) Sev, Boss, and Scorch
- Developer: LucasArts
- Publisher: LucasArts (Note: Aspyr published the Switch and PS4 versions while THQ Nordic published retail releases of both.)
- Director: Tim Longo
- Producers: Christopher Williams; Steve Matulac
- Composer: Jesse Harlin
- Series: Star Wars
- Engine: Unreal Engine 2
- Platforms: Windows; Xbox; Nintendo Switch; PlayStation 4
- Release: Windows, Xbox: NA: March 1, 2005; EU: March 4, 2005; Switch, PS4: WW: April 6, 2021
- Genres: Tactical shooter, first-person shooter
- Modes: Single-player, multiplayer

Star Wars: Republic Commando is a 2005 tactical first-person shooter video game developed and published by LucasArts for the Xbox and Microsoft Windows. Set in the Star Wars Legends expanded universe, the game revolves around Delta Squad, a special ops unit within the Galactic Republic's clone army consisting of four genetically enhanced clone troopers, referred to as "Clone Commandos." Throughout the single-player campaign, players assume the role of the squad's leader, RC-1138 ("Boss"), and complete missions during the Clone Wars. Players can also indirectly control the actions of their squadmates RC-1262 ("Scorch"), RC-1140 ("Fixer"), and RC-1207 ("Sev") by issuing different commands, which allow for certain situations to be approached in multiple ways.

Republic Commando received generally positive reviews at release, with praise directed at its story, characters, and combat, although some criticized the campaign's short length and the average multiplayer mode. Over the years, the game has come to be considered one of the best Star Wars video games ever made, along with gaining a cult following. An enhanced port of the game developed by Aspyr was released for the Nintendo Switch and PlayStation 4 on April 6, 2021. The port suffered from performance issues, which were later resolved following an update.

== Gameplay ==
Republic Commando features a heads-up display themed as a clone trooper's tactical visor. All information is displayed to the player as though they see what the main character would see.

The game features some gameplay elements that resemble features in other first-person shooters. The heads-up display (HUD) shows the player character's helmet, with a tactical visor. The player acts as squad leader of a squad of four elite troops. The squadmate order system allows the player general tactical control over the three non-player characters (NPCs) squadmates that round out the four-man commando team. Many objects in the game environment will highlight when the crosshair is placed over them. The player can then press the "use" key to issue an order automatically associated with the object; for example, a sealed door may highlight with a synchronized team breach-and-clear command, or a computer console might have a "slice" (computer hacking) command, while a pile of cargo boxes suitable for a cover position with good vantage may provide a "take up Sniper/Anti-Armor position" command. Where possible, the squadmates will usually take their preferred roles (sniper, demolitions and technical). The player can order the squad to move to secure any position (wherever the crosshair is pointed), or perform search-and-destroy. There are orders to command the squadmates to group up or spread out according to the player's discretion for the situation.

In single-player mode, the player and squadmates do not die when they run out of health, but rather are incapacitated. If the player character is downed, the player can order the squad members to attempt to revive the player or to continue with their current orders. Therefore, the game is only truly over when the player and all members of the squad are incapacitated at once or if the player is downed in a position their squadmates cannot reach (such as chasms). Certain missions may require squad members to split up to accomplish various isolated objectives, and in such scenarios, where the player is operating alone, losing all the player's health also results in a game over. While reviving a downed commando restores a small amount of health, bacta charging stations are necessary to fully regain it.

Weapons can be acquired in both single player and multiplayer. Throughout the campaign, the player always carrys the compact DC-17 and a blaster pistol with unlimited ammo. The DC-17 can be configured into an assault rifle, sniper rifle, and grenade launcher. The player may also use weapons dropped by enemies.

In line with other online-enabled games on the Xbox, multiplayer on Xbox Live was available to players until April 15, 2010. Star Wars: Republic Commando is now playable online again on the replacement Xbox Live servers called Insignia.

Republic Commando maintains a first-person perspective throughout the game, presenting the story from the eyes of Delta Squad's squad leader, RC-1138 ("Boss"). His squadmates include RC-1262 ("Scorch"), a talkative explosives expert; RC-1140 ("Fixer"), a skilled hacker and a dedicated soldier; and RC-1207 ("Sev"), the squad's sniper who enjoys racking up kills. Information is received via radio commands from a clone officer (referred to as "Advisor"), and a text-based objective list with a pop-up objective tracker arrow that points the player to the next objective.

== Plot ==
The game begins with a montage detailing Delta Squad's creation, early life, and training at the cloning facilities on Kamino. At the onset of the Clone Wars, the four members of the squad—Delta-38, 62, 40, and 07 ("Boss", "Scorch", "Fixer", and "Sev", respectively)—are deployed during the Battle of Geonosis and tasked with assassinating Sun Fac, the chief lieutenant of Geonosian Archduke and Separatist Council member Poggle the Lesser. Upon successfully terminating their target, Delta Squad is retasked to several other objectives that were originally assigned to other Clone Commando teams that have been lost to enemy ambushes. The squad proceeds to sabotage a battle droid factory located underneath Sun Fac's headquarters, disable a major anti-aircraft bunker that is wreaking havoc on the Republic Army's air forces, and sneak onto a disabled Separatist Trade Federation Lucrehulk-class Core Ship to sabotage it and steal important launch codes that will be used to prevent a significant portion of the Separatist fleet from retreating. The squad narrowly escapes the Core Ship moments before it is destroyed.

A year into the war, the now-veteran Delta Squad is sent to investigate the derelict Acclamator-class Republic Assault Ship (RAS) Prosecutor. Delta Squad splits up to investigate, quickly losing contact with command as they board the ship due to unexplained communication jamming. Making their way inside, they find the Prosecutor seemingly abandoned and in disrepair. The squad lose contact with Scorch after he reports electrical interference with his visor and Boss is soon ambushed by scavenger droids. Boss makes his way to one of the ship's logs from its data cores for investigation. As Boss is about to reunite with Sev, the latter is suddenly attacked and captured by a Trandoshan who is part of a large force of slavers and mercenaries who have taken over the ship. Having evaded capture, Boss and Fixer meet up but are soon attacked by battle droids deployed by the Trandoshans. After rescuing their captive squad members who were held in the Assault Ship's brig, Delta Squad takes back the ship's bridge and destroy a jamming device which reestablishes communication with command. It becomes clear that the Trandoshans intend to sell the vessel to the Separatists, in exchange for a sizable force of battle droids.

Delta Squad fights its way through the Trandoshan forces until they reach the hangars, where they destroy the Trandoshan dropship. Just then, a Lucrehulk-class Trade Federation Battleship drops out of hyperspace, arriving to complete the deal with the now-dead Trandoshans. As Republic reinforcements are still en route, Delta Squad defends the vessel against hordes of battle droids that are sent to board the Republic ship through its hangars. After successfully repelling the incoming droid forces and closing off the hangars, the Separatist Battleship realizes that Republic forces have regained control of the Prosecutor, and so it begins opening fire on the ship. Delta Squad fight their way through droid boarders to reach the gunnery deck and activate the ship's turbolaser batteries to defend themselves. The timely arrival of a second Republic ship, the RAS Arrestor, buys the squad enough time to activate the turbolasers. The combined fire of the two Republic Assault Ships ultimately destroys the Separatist Battleship which also shuts down all remaining battle droids on board.

As the war drags on, Delta Squad continues to undertake dangerous missions. When the Wookiee Chieftain Tarfful, an important ally of the Republic, is captured by Trandoshan slavers on Kashyyyk, Delta Squad is sent to find and rescue him. While making their way through the Trandoshan slave camp, they witness General Grievous arriving in his personal ship, the Soulless One, and are ordered to capture him if possible. The squad manage to rescue Tarfful but are too late to capture Grievous, and are left to fight his MagnaGuards. Afterwards, deducing that the Separatists and the Trandoshans are working together, Delta Squad sabotages a Trandoshan supply depot, which was actually a staging area for the Separatists’ invasion of Kashyyyk . After destroying the depot, the squad is deployed to the city of Kachirho, setting in motion the Battle of Kashyyyk. There, they move through the Wookiee tree city, securing important objectives and battling against hordes of advanced battle droids. Soldiering through Separatists forces, Delta Squad once again splits up to man four heavy anti-aircraft turrets to assist in the destruction of a Separatist destroyer hovering over Kachirho. Once the ship is destroyed, Clone Advisor CC-01/425 orders Delta Squad to regroup at Boss' position. However, Sev reports that he is under heavy attack before all communication with him is lost. Boss, Scorch, and Fixer prepare to rescue Sev, but are forced to abandon him when the Advisor orders them to evacuate immediately. As they head out on the gunship, they are debriefed by Jedi Master Yoda. A huge Republic fleet is seen deploying outside the gunship, as the now three-man Delta Squad prepares for another assignment in the battle.

== Soundtrack ==
Vode An (Brothers All)
Republic Commando features a darker and more militaristic soundtrack composed of music by Jesse Harlin, breaking from previous Star Wars games that relied upon John Williams' film soundtracks

Republic Commando is notable for being the first entry in the official Star Wars game series to feature licensed music. The song "Clones", performed by the band Ash, is played when the credits roll. The band Ash are known for their Star Wars fandom; their debut album was entitled 1977, and contained numerous Star Wars references.

The main bulk of the soundtrack is a break from convention of previous Star Wars games that use abridged versions of John Williams' original score, instead using a combination of Williams' music and new music composed by Jesse Harlin. This new music takes on a high-paced, gritty and vocal theme to the traditional Star Wars score. "The entire goal was to present a very dark and military take on the Star Wars universe from the point of view of disposable grunts – something no one had seen before," said Harlin. "Most of John Williams' material is very romantic and thematically relates to characters we weren't focusing on." Of note is the "Vode An" theme, which plays in the main menu and several key points throughout the game (such as when the player's clone commandos defeats a large group of enemies). The "Vode An" theme, as well as several other key music pieces, have additional choral lyrics in the Mandalorian language. It was these lyrics that further inspired author Karen Traviss to develop the Mandalorian language into a "fully working language".

== Reception ==
Reception

Aggregate score
Aggregator	Score
Metacritic	Xbox: 78/100; PC: 78/100; NS: 70/100; PS4: 58/100

Review scores
Publication	Score
Edge	5/10
Electronic Gaming Monthly	7.33/10
Eurogamer	8/10
Famitsu	31/40
Game Informer	8.25/10
GamePro	PC: 4.5/5; Xbox: 4/5
GameRevolution	B
GameSpot	8.7/10
GameSpy	4/5
GameZone	8.8/10
IGN	8.2/10
Official Xbox Magazine (US)	8.2/10
PC Gamer (US)	62%
Detroit Free Press	3/4
The Sydney Morning Herald	3.5/5

Star Wars: Republic Commando received "generally favorable" reviews, according to review aggregator Metacritic.

In the United Kingdom, sales of Republic Commando's Xbox version surpassed 60,000 copies by the end of 2005. In France, 85,000 units were shipped for the game's launch.

== Sequels ==
A sequel titled Star Wars: Republic Commando: Order 66 was released in August 2005 for mobile phones running Symbian OS, and was developed by Magellan and published by THQ Wireless. Another sequel was already planned well ahead of production of Republic Commando. Titled Star Wars: Imperial Commando, the game would have explored the Republic's transition into the Galactic Empire from Delta Squad's perspective, but the project only went as far as concept art before being cancelled. Nevertheless, Karen Traviss wrote a fifth and final novel of the Republic Commando novel series, titling it Star Wars Imperial Commando: 501st, after the cancelled sequel.

=== List of novels ===
- Star Wars Republic Commando: Hard Contact (October 26, 2004) Book 1
- Star Wars Republic Commando: Triple Zero (February 28, 2006) Book 2
- Star Wars Republic Commando: True Colors (October 30, 2007) Book 3
- Star Wars Republic Commando: Order 66 (September 16, 2008) Book 4
- Star Wars Imperial Commando: 501st (October 27, 2009) Book 5

== Legacy ==
In April 2014, following The Walt Disney Company's acquisition of Lucasfilm, most of the licensed Star Wars novels, comics, and video games produced since the originating 1977 film were rebranded as Star Wars Legends and declared non-canon to the franchise going forward. Republic Commando was among the projects affected by this, as the events depicted in its campaign would no longer be considered canon. However, the game's characters remained canon thanks to Delta Squad's inclusion in "Witches of the Mist", an episode from the third season of the 2008 animated series Star Wars: The Clone Wars (whose canonicity remained intact after the acquisition). The series' supervising director Dave Filoni cited Republic Commando as an inspiration when creating the clone characters from the show. One of the squad's members, Scorch, later re-appeared in the 2021 sequel series, Star Wars: The Bad Batch. The helmet HUD design from the game was also briefly seen in the series.

The concept of Clone Commandos introduced in the game has been featured in several other Star Wars works since. The episode "Missing in Action" of the fifth season of The Clone Wars introduces the character Captain Gregor, a former Clone Commando suffering from amnesia. The season seven episode "The Bad Batch" introduces Clone Force 99, a squad of four (later five) genetically enhanced clones very similar in concept to Delta Squad. Clone Commandos are also playable in the 2017 video game Star Wars Battlefront II.

Republic Commando is also notable for originating the term clanker, used in-game as a derogatory term for battle droids. The word has since gained popularity beyond the Star Wars fandom as a slur for artificial intelligence in the 2020s.

== See also ==
- Delta Squad
