= Karen Traviss =

British science fiction author

Karen Traviss is a British science fiction author from Wiltshire, England. She is the author of the Wess'Har series, and has written tie-in material based on Star Wars, Gears of War, Halo, G.I. Joe and the newest Nomad Series working with Nick Cole and Jason Anspach. Her work crosses various forms of media including novels, short stories, comics, and video games.

== Biography ==
Traviss is originally from the Portsmouth area. She worked as both a journalist and defence correspondent before turning her attention to writing fiction, and has served in both the Territorial Army and the Royal Naval Auxiliary Service. Traviss is a graduate of the Clarion Science Fiction and Fantasy workshop.

Her first published novel, City of Pearl (2004), centred on the clash of several distinct alien civilizations, several hundred years in the future. It was shortlisted for the John W. Campbell Memorial Award for Best Science Fiction Novel and the Philip K. Dick Award. She has since written five sequels to City of Pearl: Crossing the Line (2004), The World Before (2005), Matriarch (2006), Ally (2007), and Judge (2008).

In 2014, Traviss published Going Grey, a techno-thriller and the first novel in a series called Ringer.

== Media tie-in works ==
=== Star Wars ===
In addition to creating her own fictional settings, Traviss has written novels using existing intellectual property—particularly in the Star Wars universe. Traviss wrote the Republic Commando series, beginning with Hard Contact in 2004 and continuing with Triple Zero (2006), True Colors (2007), and Order 66 (2008). In 2009, a related novel featuring the same characters was released (Star Wars Imperial Commando: 501st).

In addition to the Republic Commando Series, Traviss was one of three authors retained by Lucasfilm and Del Rey Books to pen a nine novel series called Legacy of the Force (the other two authors were Aaron Allston and Troy Denning). Her three contributions to the series are Legacy of the Force: Bloodlines (2006), Legacy of the Force: Sacrifice (2007) and Legacy of the Force: Revelation (2008). Thematically, her work within the Star Wars universe has frequently centered on Mandalorians and their language, culture and history. In particular, her Republic Commando novels have explored themes of identity with regards to clone troopers, their Mandalorian heritage, and their interaction with Jedi leadership. Traviss has since parted from Del Rey due to creative differences.

=== Gears of War ===
In addition to Star Wars novels, Traviss also wrote a Gears of War prequel novel, Gears of War: Aspho Fields which was released on 28 October 2008. She then went on to write the sequels Gears of War: Jacinto's Remnant, released on 28 July 2009, Gears of War: Anvil Gate, released on 31 August 2010 and Gears of War: Coalition's End, released on 2 August 2011, and Gears of War: The Slab, released in May 2012. She also served as the lead writer for Gears of War 3.

=== Halo ===
She wrote, with Eric Nylund and Tobias S. Buckell and other authors, the short story Human Weakness in Halo Evolutions: Essential Tales of the Halo Universe, which was released in November 2009.

On 21 July 2010 Traviss announced on her blog that she had signed a multi-book deal to write novels set in the Halo universe. The first book is set after the events of Halo: Ghosts of Onyx, and is a continuation of that story line. Explaining why she had agreed to write in the Halo universe, Traviss said that "Believe it or not, I really have found the backbone to turn down other series featuring heavily armoured, unfeasibly cannoned-up chaps struggling to find their place in an unfriendly world. I'm not a soft touch for any old bloke with a codpiece, people. But this is Halo. There's an awkward and upsetting moral dilemma at the heart of the story, and if there's something I can't resist more than money, it's exploring moral dilemmas. (With big weapons, naturally.) You haven't spotted it? Pay attention at the back, there. There is a story."

Traviss has written comic books as well. She began with a stint on Gears of War before moving on to Batman: Arkham Unhinged. In 2014 she began writing G.I. Joe comics for IDW Publishing.

== Bibliography ==
=== The Wess'har Wars ===
- City of Pearl (March 2004)
- Crossing the Line (September 2004)
- The World Before (October 2005)
- Matriarch (October 2006)
- Ally (March 2007)
- Judge (March 2008)

=== Star Wars novels ===
- Republic Commando
  - Hard Contact (November 2004)
  - Triple Zero (February 2006)
  - True Colors (October 2007)
  - Order 66 (September 2008)
  - 501st (October 2009), first and last book of the Imperial Commando series
- The Clone Wars
  - The Clone Wars (July 2008) (novelization of The Clone Wars film)
  - No Prisoners (May 2009)
- Legacy of the Force
  - Bloodlines (August 2006), Book 2 of Legacy of the Force (follows Betrayal; followed by Tempest)
  - Sacrifice (May 2007), Book 5 of Legacy of the Force (follows Exile; followed by Inferno)
  - Revelation (February 2008), Book 8 of Legacy of the Force (follows Fury; followed by Invincible)

=== Gears of War series ===
- Aspho Fields (October 2008)
- Jacinto's Remnant
- Anvil Gate
- Coalition's End (August 2011)
- The Slab (May 2012)

=== Halo novels ===
- Kilo-Five Trilogy
  - Halo: Glasslands, a sequel to Halo: Ghosts of Onyx (25 October 2011)
  - Halo: The Thursday War (2 October 2012)
  - Halo: Mortal Dictata (21 January 2014)

=== Ringer series ===
- Going Grey (2014)
- Black Run (2017)
- Here We Die (2023)

=== Star Wars short stories ===
- "Omega Squad: Targets", in Star Wars Insider 81 (reprinted in Star Wars Republic Commando: Triple Zero)
- "In His Image", in Vader: The Ultimate Guide (reprinted in paperback edition of Star Wars: Legacy of the Force - Betrayal)
- "A Two-Edged Sword", sequel to In His Image, in Star Wars Insider 85 (reprinted in paperback edition of Star Wars: Legacy of the Force - Betrayal)
- "Odds" in Star Wars Insider 87 (reprinted in Star Wars Republic Commando: True Colors)
- "Boba Fett: A Practical Man" e-novella (2006) (reprinted in paperback edition of Star Wars: Legacy of the Force - Sacrifice)

=== Other short stories ===
- "Strings", in Realms of Fantasy July 2002
- "A Slice at a Time", in Asimov's Science Fiction July 2002
- "Suitable for the Orient", in Asimov's Science Fiction February 2003
- "Return Stores", in Realms of Fantasy February 2003
- "The Man Who Did Nothing", in Realms of Fantasy June 2003
- "Does He Take Blood?", in Realms of Fantasy August 2003
- "Human Weakness", in Halo: Evolutions: Essential Tales of the Halo Universe (Tor Books, November 2009)

=== Comics ===
- Gears of War #15-24 (February 2011 - June 2012)
- Batman: Arkham Unhinged #44-58 (September 2012 - January 2013)
- G.I. Joe (vol. 4) (IDW Publishing) #1-8 (September 2014 - April 2015)
- Sensation Comics Featuring Wonder Woman (DC Comics) #14 (September 2015)

=== Essays ===
- "I Gotta Get Me One of Those", in the essay anthology Navigating the Golden Compass: Religion, Science & Daemonology in Philip Pullman's His Dark Materials (Smart Pop Series, BenBella Books, August 2005)
- "Driving GFFA 1: or How Star Wars Loosened My Corsets", in Star Wars on Trial : Science Fiction and Fantasy Writers Debate the Most Popular Science Fiction Films of All Time (ed. David Brin, 2006).

=== Features ===
- "Guide to the Grand Army of the Republic" in Star Wars Insider 84 (with co-author Ryan Kaufman)
- "The Mandalorians: People and Culture" in Star Wars Insider 86
- "Sprinting the Marathon" in Emerald City. Traviss explains why she writes spin-off fiction
