= Star Wars: Battlefront (disambiguation) =

Star Wars: Battlefront is a video game series in the Star Wars franchise.

Star Wars: Battlefront may also refer to:

- Star Wars: Battlefront (2004 video game), the first game in the series
- Star Wars Battlefront (2015 video game), a reboot of the first Battlefront game

== See also ==
- Star Wars: Battlefront II (disambiguation)
