= Star Wars Battlefront (2015 video game) =

2015 video game

- Developer: DICE (Note: Criterion Games assisted on developing the speeder bikes and the Rogue One: X-wing VR Mission and Visceral Games also assisted development.)
- Publisher: Electronic Arts
- Producer: Sigurlína Ingvarsdóttir
- Designer: Niklas Fegraeus
- Artist: Ken Brown
- Composer: Gordy Haab
- Series: Star Wars: Battlefront
- Engine: Frostbite 3
- Platforms: Microsoft Windows; PlayStation 4 Xbox One
- Release: NA: November 17, 2015; AU: November 18, 2015; EU: November 19, 2015
- Genres: First-person shooter, third-person shooter
- Modes: Single-player, multiplayer

Star Wars Battlefront is a 2015 action shooter video game developed by DICE and published by Electronic Arts. The game, based on the fictional universe of the Star Wars franchise, is the third main installment of the Star Wars: Battlefront series, but is considered a reboot to the previous games, instead of a sequel, to reflect the new Star Wars canon that Lucasfilm established (to replace the Star Wars expanded universe) after being acquired by Disney. The game was released in November 2015 for PlayStation 4, Xbox One and Microsoft Windows.

Battlefront received mixed to positive reviews from critics, who praised its gameplay, visuals, music, technical aspects and high production values, but criticized its lack of content at launch in both single and multiplayer modes, and use of a season pass model. Despite this, the game was a commercial success, with more than 14 million copies sold worldwide. A sequel, Star Wars Battlefront II, was released on November 17, 2017.

== Gameplay ==
Players can control characters from the films, such as Luke Skywalker and Darth Vader.

Star Wars Battlefront is an action game played from either a first-person or third-person view; players can switch views whenever desired, similar to previous games, except when controlling "hero" characters or their personal guards. Players traverse planets from the original Star Wars trilogy, such as Endor, Hoth, Tatooine, Bespin, and Sullust, as well as the planet of Jakku introduced in the sequel trilogy. To navigate the game's various maps, players use a variety of vehicles, including both air and land-based vehicles, such as speeder bikes and AT-STs, which can be unlocked during every match by finding tokens that spawn randomly across the map. Battles are planet-based, restricting players from exploring space. The only maps that are space-based were added through DLC, namely in the "Death Star" pack (released in September 2016), which included the titular Death Star, and the "Rogue One" pack (released in December 2016 and based on the film of the same name), which included Scarif. The game's weapons, characters, gear, and abilities are customizable. As new weapons are unlocked, players have the ability to share them with their teammates. Battlefront does not feature iron sights apart from one blaster, but allows players to zoom in for better accuracy.

The game lets players choose whether to control a Rebel Alliance soldier or an Imperial Stormtrooper. Players can also assume the role of iconic characters from the Star Wars films, who serve as "heroes" and, similarly to vehicles, are unlocked during every match by finding specific tokens across the map. At launch, the hero roster included Luke Skywalker, Darth Vader, Han Solo, Emperor Palpatine, Leia Organa, and Boba Fett, with Nien Nunb, Greedo, Lando Calrissian, Dengar, Bossk, Chewbacca, Jyn Erso, and Orson Krennic being added later through DLC. Non-playable characters such as C-3PO, Admiral Ackbar, and Jabba the Hutt also make minor appearances in the game. The game includes cooperative missions, which can be played offline, but excludes a campaign mode. Players can complete the missions both independently and with bots or another player; the game supports split screen on consoles. The game's online multiplayer mode supports up to 40 players in one match and consists of 16 multiplayer maps. These maps feature five locations from the Star Wars universe: Hoth, Tatooine, Endor, Sullust, and Jakku, with three more locations added through different DLCs: Cloud City on Bespin, the Death Star, and Scarif.

=== Multiplayer ===
Multiplayer is the main focus of Battlefront. There are several different modes:

Walker Assault

A mode where there are 40 players on each team, the Rebels and the Imperials. The Rebels' objective is to destroy the Empire's AT-AT walkers, which are advancing on their position. The Empire's objective is to prevent them from doing so. The Rebels must keep their uplink stations online so their Y-Wing bombers will be able to perform bombing runs on the walkers. The Empire must keep the uplinks offline or shut them down when necessary.

Fighter Squadron

A starship-only mode, it is essentially a team deathmatch in the sky. Additionally, each side will spawn in a transport ship, which the other team must destroy. Either team wins upon reaching 200 points.

Blast

A team deathmatch-type mode with 20 players. Whichever team gets 100 kills first wins.

Supremacy

A 40-player mode; the objective for both teams is to capture as many control points as possible. The team that captures the most control points will win.

Hero Hunt

A "Cat-and-Mouse" style game mode which pits a single Hero character against seven other players on the opposing team. The Hero must stay alive as long as possible and kill attacking pursuers. Once a pursuer kills the Hero, the round ends and the players that dealt the most damage will become the next Hero. The person with the highest number of kills at the end of the match, or the first one to obtain 50 kills, will win the game.

Heroes vs. Villains

This round-based game mode features all hero and villain characters from the Rebel Alliance and Galactic Empire. Teams of six must keep their three heroes or villains (four in the Outer Rim maps) alive while defeating the enemy heroes or villains of the other team. The heroes or villains are supported by infantry. For heroes and villains that have bodyguards, they are limited to two spawns only. The first team to win five rounds will win the match.

Cargo

This capture the flag-style game mode has two teams of six trying to steal each other's cargo whilst defending their own.

Drop Zone

A 12-player mode where teams of six fight for control of drop pods that occasionally fall from the sky. Every player is able to claim a pod which starts a timer. If, during that timer, a player from the other team claims the pod, the timer will reset and the process can repeat. If the claiming timer ever completes, the team who claimed it will gain one point. The first team to claim five pods wins.

== Development and release ==
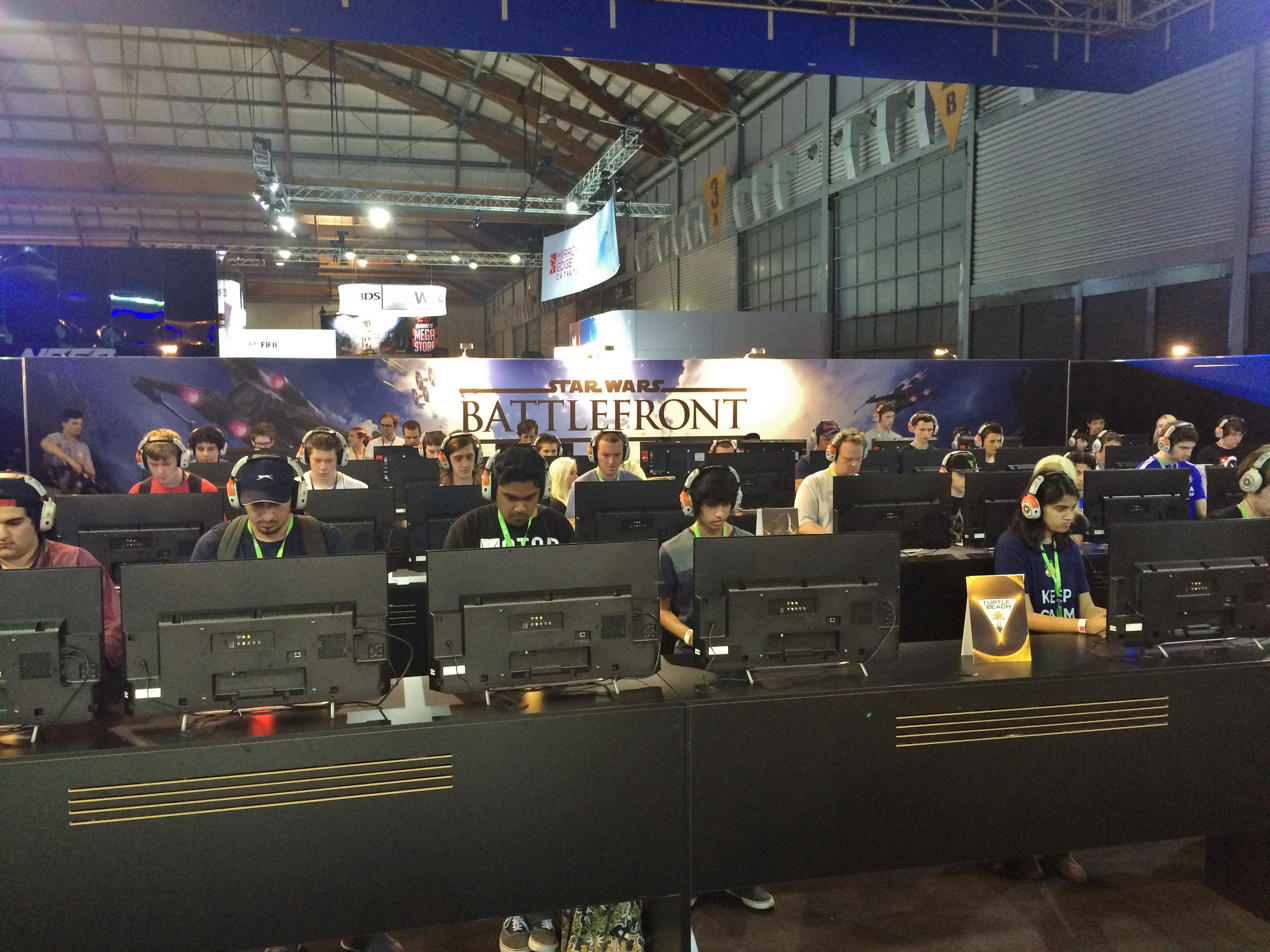
A group of 30 attendees at the EB Games Expo play a match on a single server in Star Wars Battlefront.

In May 2013, publisher Electronic Arts obtained exclusive rights to develop Star Wars games for gaming consoles, and its subsidiaries DICE, Visceral Games, and BioWare started work on Star Wars games after LucasArts was shut down. DICE first acknowledged the game at Electronic Arts' E3 2013 press conference, along with a teaser trailer. The game is built with the Frostbite 3 engine; studio head Patrick Söderlund stated that the game would be "DICE's interpretation of what Battlefront should be", while still incorporating elements from the previous two games. As such, DICE did not brand the new game as a sequel to Battlefront II, but a reboot of the franchise. Söderlund said that the game almost was not developed, but that staffers at DICE lobbied to be given the project; he called DICE's development of Battlefront "a match made in heaven". Instead of using traditional modeling techniques, the developers used photogrammetry to produce the assets. Small teams formed by artists were responsible for selecting the right assets that could be used by level designers to build maps. According to DICE, the process of developing the assets for the game took half as much time as developing the assets for Battlefield 4, which were produced by using traditional modeling techniques.

In June 2014, it was revealed at EA's E3 2014 press conference that the ice planet Hoth and the forest moon of Endor would be playable maps for the game. In late October of that year, it was revealed that the game would be released Christmas 2015, tying in with the release of Star Wars: The Force Awakens. To meet the deadline, the team had to remove the game's single-player campaign mode. In early March 2015, the first gameplay footage of the game was shown at a private retail event and received a standing ovation from the audience. In April 2015, at Star Wars Celebration 2015 in Anaheim, California, the first gameplay details and the second trailer was released. The first downloadable content of the game, entitled Battle of Jakku, was also announced during the event.

In April 2015, EA announced that Battlefront would release in North America on November 17 and in Europe on November 20 of that year, And in Australia on November 18. It was previously stated that the release date for Europe would fall on November 19. It was confirmed that the game would not feature the Battlelog system, but to use a new system developed by Uprise, an Electronic Arts subsidiary based in Sweden, which has previously worked on the Battlelog system of Battlefield 4. On June 15, further gameplay was shown at E3 2015 depicting the Walker Assault mode on Hoth from perspectives of both the Rebel Alliance and the Galactic Empire using various weapons, items and vehicles such as the AT-AT walker, Snowspeeders and TIE Fighters ending with playable characters Luke Skywalker and Darth Vader engaging in battle. Another gameplay trailer featuring cooperative missions was also shown at the event. An open beta of the game was released for PC, PlayStation 4 and Xbox One on October 8. The beta includes the Walker Assault, Drop Zone, and Survival mission modes. The beta was originally set to close on October 12 but was extended to October 13 for testing of "extreme scenarios". The beta was played by more than nine and a half million players. According to Electronic Arts, it was their largest beta.

Fellow EA developer Criterion Games, known for making racing games, helped DICE develop the speeder bikes for the game. Visceral Games also assisted in an undisclosed capacity.

=== Downloadable content ===
Star Wars Battlefront features downloadable content (DLC). A season pass was announced on October 12, 2015, and includes four DLC packs. The Ultimate Edition of the game, which was released digitally, includes all the content from the Deluxe Edition and the season pass. Aside from the content of the season pass, additional content was released for free, including new maps and star cards.

The first downloadable content release, titled Battle of Jakku, was revealed during Star Wars Celebration 2015 and became available as a free download for all players on December 8, 2015. Players who had pre-ordered the game received the Battle of Jakku a week earlier, on December 1, 2015. It features two maps set on the planet Jakku. Outer Rim is the second DLC pack for the game and was released on March 22, 2016. It adds maps set in Jabba the Hutt's palace on Tatooine and a factory area on Sullust. It also includes iconic characters Nien Nunb and Greedo. The new content is available exclusively to players who have purchased the season pass. Outer Rim is the first of four DLC packs included in the season pass. The second expansion pack is titled Bespin and was released on June 21, 2016. It introduces a new map set in Cloud City, Bespin, and the playable characters Lando Calrissian and Dengar. The third expansion pack, titled Death Star, was released on September 20, 2016, and marked the debut of the Death Star in the game, as well as the addition of Chewbacca and Bossk as playable characters. The final expansion pack released as part of the season pass, Rogue One: Scarif, launched on December 20, 2016, and is based on the film Rogue One: A Star Wars Story. It saw the addition of a new map based on the tropical planet Scarif from the film, as well as two playable characters: Director Orson Krennic for the Empire, and Jyn Erso for the Rebellion.

==== Rogue One: X-Wing VR Mission ====
Criterion Games developed a PlayStation VR exclusive mission titled Rogue One: X-Wing VR Mission, taking place alongside the events of Rogue One: A Star Wars Story. It was released as a free download on the PlayStation 4 in December 2016 and requires the PlayStation VR headset and PlayStation Camera.

=== Tie-in game ===
Base Command is a companion app available on the App Store and Google Play. It can be played with or without owning Star Wars Battlefront. Players defend the Rebel base from the Galactic Empire using Star Cards featuring vehicles, weapons, and power-ups. In the companion app, players can earn virtual credits, which can be used to unlock star cards, weapons, and character customization in the main game.

=== Tie-in novel ===
A novel based on the game, titled Star Wars Battlefront: Twilight Company, was written by Alexander Freed, a former developer from Electronic Arts subsidiary BioWare. It is his debut novel. IGN gave the book a positive review.

== Reception ==
=== Pre-release ===
Leon Hurley of GamesRadar had a positive impression of Star Wars Battlefront beta. He praised the game's gunplay for its being "strong" and seeming "great" but heavily criticized Walker Assault, one of the game's modes, for its difficulty of winning it as a Rebel. He compared the game's visuals to the Star Wars films' realistic clashes. Moreover, he praised the accuracy of Stormtroopers for its being "at least 100% true to the movie" and called wave-one soldiers "exceptionally special" while pointing out the flaw that the game had an unusual balance of Star Wars heroes and villains. For example, Darth Vader would be splatted by any passing ship while Luke Skywalker would have "far more luck on the 'looking epic' side of things" such as successfully destroying an AT-ST solo. Another flaw which he had pointed out is the "weird" and "infuriating" timing of ending scenes in which screens overlap the ends of matches.

The game's lack of a campaign for the single-player mode was criticized. Steven Storm of Ars Technica praised the visuals, stating: "DICE has at least captured the look and feel of Star Wars, perhaps better than any other game with the license before it." He likened gameplay to the "standard Battlefield formula of walk, get shot, respawn, and repeat...".

=== Post-release ===
Reception

Aggregate score
Aggregator	Score
Metacritic	(PC) 72/100 (PS4) 73/100 (XONE) 75/100

Review scores
Publication	Score
Destructoid	6/10
Electronic Gaming Monthly	7/10
Game Informer	7.5/10
GameRevolution	3.5/5
GameSpot	7/10
GamesRadar+	4/5
GameTrailers	8.1/10
Giant Bomb	3/5
IGN	8/10
PC Gamer (US)	72/100
VideoGamer.com	7/10

Star Wars Battlefront received "mixed reviews" for the PC and PlayStation 4 and positive reviews for the Xbox One, according to video game review aggregator website Metacritic. Mizuho Securities analyst Neil Doshi noted the negative reviews, but predicted that the game would prevail as a financial hit. Mike Mahardy of GameSpot criticised the game's combat as repetitive. Dan Ryckert of Giant Bomb praised the game for capturing the Star Wars feel. Due to heavy criticism about the gameplay's lack of depth and approach to casual gamers, Blake Jorgensen, Electronic Arts' chief financial officer admitted that the game was intentionally designed to be accessible for those new to first-person shooter games, or children wanting to play with their parents, going against the hardcore fanbase of Star Wars: Battlefront (2004).

The universal consensus among many critics is that the game's visuals are generally praiseworthy. For that reason, Mitch Dyer of IGN referred to the game as one of the best-looking games of the generation.

The feeling of Battlefront's lack of content upon release was noticed by several critics. Andrew Reiner of Game Informer criticized the Season Pass approach by feeling a little cheated given the sparse content available at launch.

The Official UK PlayStation Magazine listed the X-Wing mission as the fifth best PS VR game.

=== Sales ===
Electronic Arts expected the game to sell nine to ten million copies before the end of the company's 2016 financial year on March 31, 2016. After the release of the game's beta, the company hoped the game to sell at least 13 million copies by the end of March 2016. Star Wars Battlefront debuted at number one in the UK for retail non-digital sales according to Chart-Track in its first week of release, and became the fourth fastest-selling title released in 2015. It marked the biggest launch of a video game in the Star Wars franchise, and exceeded the sales of Star Wars: The Force Unleashed, the previous record holder, by 117%. It was also the fastest-selling online PlayStation 4 video game in the UK, breaking the record previously held by Destiny.

In early December 2015, GameStop president Tony Bartel told retail investors that a number of key November games had sold fewer copies than the chain had expected. Star Wars Battlefront was one of three titles listed, along with Halo 5 and Assassin's Creed Syndicate. Peter Moore, however, defended Star Wars Battlefront's launch sales and spoke out to investors to say that Electronic Arts was still standing by its target of selling 13 million copies by the end of March 2016. According to analyst Michael Pachter, 12 million copies had been sold as of December 31, 2015. Electronic Arts made its sales goal of shipping 13 million copies of the game by the start of 2016 and had shipped 14 million copies by May 2016. Although launched in 2015, the game sold well enough to be the seventeenth best-selling game in the UK in 2016. In Japan, the PlayStation 4 version sold 123,908 copies within its first week of release, placing it at number one on the all format sales chart.

=== Awards ===
List of awards and nominations
Award	Category	Result	Ref.
The Game Awards 2015	Best Shooter	Nominated	
2015 National Academy of Video Game Trade Reviewers (NAVGTR) awards	Sound Effects	Won	
2015 National Academy of Video Game Trade Reviewers (NAVGTR) awards	Use of Sound, Franchise	Won	
2015 National Academy of Video Game Trade Reviewers (NAVGTR) awards	Lighting/Texturing	Nominated	
2015 National Academy of Video Game Trade Reviewers (NAVGTR) awards	Graphics, Technical	Won	
19th Annual D.I.C.E. Awards	Action Game of the Year	Won	
19th Annual D.I.C.E. Awards	Outstanding Achievement in Art Direction	Nominated	
19th Annual D.I.C.E. Awards	Outstanding Achievement in Sound Design	Won	
19th Annual D.I.C.E. Awards	Outstanding Technical Achievement	Nominated	

== Sequel ==
A sequel developed by EA DICE, Motive Studios and Criterion Games was released on November 17, 2017.
