= Star Wars: Battlefront II =

Star Wars: Battlefront II may refer to:

- Star Wars: Battlefront II (2005 video game), a 2005 first- and third-person shooter video game
- Star Wars Battlefront II (2017 video game), a 2017 action shooter video game

== See also ==
- Star Wars: Battlefront (disambiguation)
