= Star Wars: Battlefront (2004 video game) =

2004 action shooter video game

- Developer: Pandemic Studios (Note: Ported to Mac OS X by Beenox. Mobile version developed by Mikoishi. Classic Collection developed by Aspyr.)
- Publisher: LucasArts (Note: Published to Mac OS X by Aspyr. Mobile version published by THQ Wireless. Classic Collection published by Aspyr.)
- Director: Eric Gewirtz
- Producer: Christopher Williams
- Designer: Jens Hartvig Andersen
- Artists: Dean Betton; Matthew Palmer; Juan L. Sanchez
- Series: Star Wars: Battlefront
- Engine: Zero
- Platforms: Windows, PlayStation 2, Xbox, Mac OS X, mobile phone Classic Collection; Nintendo Switch, PlayStation 4, PlayStation 5, Windows, Xbox One, Xbox Series X/S
- Release: September 17, 2004: Windows, PlayStation 2, Xbox; AU: September 17, 2004 (PS2); NA: September 21, 2004; AU: September 22, 2004 (PC, Xbox); NZ: September 23, 2004; EU: September 24, 2004; Mac OS X; July 18, 2005; Mobile; November 1, 2005; Classic Collection Windows, Nintendo Switch, PlayStation 4, PlayStation 5, Xbox One, Xbox Series X/S; WW: March 14, 2024
- Genres: Third-person shooter, first-person shooter
- Modes: Single-player, multiplayer

Star Wars: Battlefront is a 2004 first and third-person shooter video game based on the Star Wars film franchise. Developed by Pandemic Studios and published by LucasArts, it is the first installment in the Star Wars: Battlefront series. It was released in September 2004 for PlayStation 2, Xbox and Windows to coincide with the release of the Star Wars Trilogy DVD set. Aspyr released a Mac OS X port in July 2005, and a mobile phone version, Star Wars Battlefront Mobile, was released on November 1, 2005.

Battlefront is primarily played as a conquest game. Other modes such as Galactic Conquest include strategy elements. The game features several locales from major Star Wars battles, and includes voice acting from veteran voice actors Temuera Morrison, Tom Kane, and Nick Jameson.

Battlefront received generally favorable reviews from critics, averaging an 80% approval rating across all platforms at aggregate websites GameRankings and Metacritic. Critics praised the multiplayer component and the ability to play a part in major Star Wars battles, however the lacking single player component and poor AI were points of concern. The game sold in excess of 4 million units in sales. A sequel, Star Wars: Battlefront II, was released on November 1, 2005, for Windows, Xbox, PlayStation 2 and PlayStation Portable. A compilation featuring both games, Star Wars: Battlefront Classic Collection, was released for Windows, Nintendo Switch, PlayStation 4, PlayStation 5, Xbox One, and Xbox Series X/S in March 2024.

== Gameplay ==
Gameplay in Star Wars: Battlefront showcasing an Imperial snowtrooper on the map Rhen Var: Citadel. The objective is to eliminate all enemy forces or capture all command posts (seen in red in the background).

Star Wars: Battlefront encompasses battles between four main factions from both the original and prequel Star Wars trilogies: the Galactic Republic and the Confederacy of Independent Systems (CIS) from the prequel trilogy era, and the Rebel Alliance and Galactic Empire from the original trilogy era. In each faction, five different classes of character become available. Four main classes are similar across each faction — infantry, heavy weapons, pilot and sniper — while the fifth is unique. Each faction also has a non-playable hero character that participates in battle for a limited amount of time: Mace Windu (Republic), Count Dooku (CIS), Luke Skywalker (Rebels), and Darth Vader (Empire).

Gameplay in Battlefront is conquest-based. Each faction has a finite amount of reinforcements, and each is given control of a set number of command posts in a given level. The object is to either eliminate enemy forces or capture and hold all command posts simultaneously for 20 seconds. Several ground and air vehicles are available on the battlefield. These range from the hulking AT-AT to the fast speeder bike and vary based on the level. There are more than 25 vehicles in-game. Some larger vehicles also function as mobile command posts, which cannot be captured, but are lost if the vehicle is destroyed. In addition, some maps have indigenous forces. These can be neutral to both factions, such as Jawas, hostile to one faction, such as Wookiees, or hostile to both factions, such as Tusken Raiders. Command posts belonging to hostile natives can be captured to minimize their presence.

The Microsoft Windows and Macintosh versions of Star Wars: Battlefront can be played online with up to 64 players via local area network (LAN) or over the internet via GameSpy. The Xbox version can accommodate up to 32 players whilst the PlayStation 2 version supports 16 players, or it can be played in split screen mode with two players. The PlayStation 2 version utilizes specialized GameSpy servers, while the Xbox utilized Microsoft's Xbox Live network. Online multiplayer on the Xbox was available until the original Xbox Live servers were shut down on April 15, 2010. Star Wars: Battlefront is playable online on the replacement Xbox Live servers Insignia.

=== Single-player modes ===
While Star Wars: Battlefront is played similarly in every mode, each is a unique scenario which utilizes mode-specific features to further extend gameplay. Three modes are presented to the player: Campaign, which serves as the game's story mode, Galactic Conquest, in which the player must conquer planets, and Instant Action, which allows the player to select the battle they wish to play and adjust settings such as reinforcements to their liking.

Campaign groups several battles together in a set order loosely based on the historical campaign of either the Clone Wars (as depicted in the prequel trilogy), or the Galactic Civil War (as depicted in the original trilogy). As Star Wars: Episode III – Revenge of the Sith had not yet been released at the time, the Clone Wars campaign ends with the Battle of Kashyyyk. Footage from the five films released prior to Battlefront are used as cutscenes between battles. The player starts the campaign as either a droid of the Separatist army or an Imperial stormtrooper. Around halfway through the chosen campaign, the perspective switches to the clone troopers or Rebels. To maintain continuity, missions prior to the Battle of Geonosis pit the Separatists against native forces only, and for the first two missions the super battle droid is unavailable, replaced with a standard battle droid.

In Galactic Conquest, the player uses strategy to take control of planets and dominate an area of the galaxy. First, the player chooses a map configuration based on conflicts from both eras of Star Wars history. Some maps start both sides evenly, while others favor one faction. Next, the player chooses which faction to play as. The game is played in turns, with the player starting first. The player can select an enemy-controlled or neutral planet to attack. After selecting what planet to attack, the player is able to activate a bonus from one of their already owned planets (if any). Each planet provides its own unique bonus, but must be captured before the player can use it. Bonuses help the player in battle by impeding the enemy or assisting the player's team. If one side manages to win four battles (not necessarily in a row), they gain access to their faction's Secret Base bonus. Secret Base bonuses are very powerful and can change the course of a game. They can be used on any enemy planet, except for the enemy's Secret Base. The game is completed when one faction controls all planets on the map.

Instant Action mode allows the players to jump right into a battle of their choice. The player can also customize a list of battles, which then can be played through in the order they have chosen, or in a random order. Players can choose between playing as the Republic, the CIS, the Empire, or the Rebels on each of the maps; however, the maps for Kamino, Geonosis, Hoth, and Endor do not allow the player to select their battle era, as these follow their canonical settings. Players can also choose whether or not they would like to have heroes fight for each side.

== Development ==
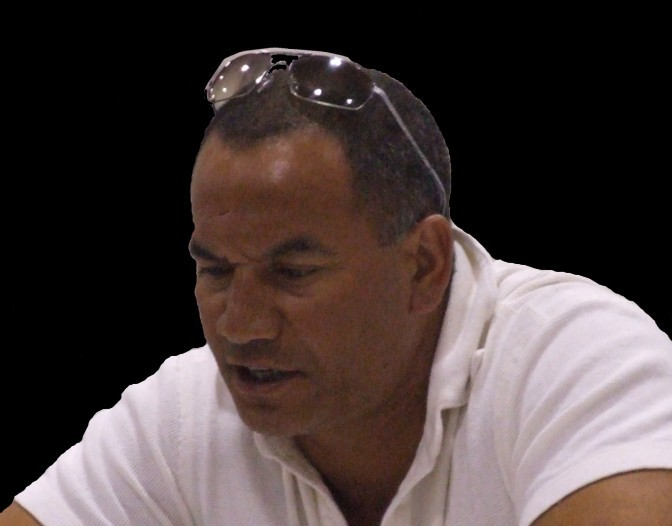
Temuera Morrison reprised his voice acting role for the clone troopers in Battlefront.

Development for Star Wars: Battlefront began at Pandemic Studios in 2002. Greg Burrod, executive producer on Battlefront stated "We wanted to create an online shooter title for the Xbox, PS2, and PC which would allow for team strategy and would feature battles and worlds from every one of the six Star Wars films." Models and animations for the game were created in Softimage XSI, a 3D development application. Most characters used a common animation set and the minimal number of bones were used due to concerns with hardware limitations at that time. World environments were created with the developer's proprietary editor, ZeroEditor. The terrain-based landscape was formed using the editor's brushes to adjust height, texture application, and color shading. 3D models were then laid on this foundation along with general objective pathing for the artificial intelligence (AI). The AI used two main systems, again to ensure a minimal load on the hardware. A higher, overall objective, such as which command post to head towards, would only be calculated every few seconds per unit. Lower level objectives such as which enemy to fire on or what defensive strategy to take against incoming fire, are calculated continuously.

Some sounds and Foley for the game were taken from Star Wars reference material, while others were recorded during a two-day visit to Skywalker Ranch, near Nicasio, California. The game has approximately 1,200 Foley sounds that are used to convey the impression of such aspects as interaction with flora and fauna, water, and metals. Actor Temuera Morrison voiced the Republic faction's clone troopers, reprising his role from the film Star Wars: Episode II – Attack of the Clones. Tom Kane voiced the characters Admiral Ackbar and Yoda. Nick Jameson voiced Darth Sidious / Emperor Palpatine. Both Kane and Jameson have voiced multiple characters in the Star Wars universe, including the 2008 series Star Wars: The Clone Wars.

A game design guide showcases cut content from the game. The Separatist faction was originally supposed to have a bounty hunter class, with the model being an IG droid. The Republic faction had playable Jedi while the Imperial faction had an officer class. The document also references planets originally appearing in the game, including Correlia, Korriban, Raxus Prime, Thyferra, Mon Calamari, Despayre Station, and Ossus.

LucasArts released an Xbox-exclusive playable demo on the Star Wars Trilogy DVD set. The demo included one level, the Battle of Endor. The game released in North America on September 21, 2004, the same day as the Trilogy DVD set. In Australia, the PlayStation 2 version was released on September 17, 2004, and for Windows and Xbox on September 22, 2004. The game was also released in New Zealand and Europe on September 23 and 24, respectively. In late 2004, Pandemic Studios released unsupported mod tools for Windows, allowing players to create their own maps, as well as edit the weapons and characters for all sides in the game. This release is not supported by LucasArts. A number of communities now exist solely based around creating maps and characters using these tools, and uploading them for others to download. Aspyr was contracted to port the game to Macintosh systems; it was released on July 18, 2005, for Mac OS X. On November 1, 2005, mobile developer Mikoishi and publisher THQ released Star Wars Battlefront Mobile for cellular phones. After eight years, the GameSpy matchmaking servers were shut down on November 7, 2012. A GameSpy representative stated the service agreement between LucasArts and GameSpy had been terminated as LucasArts chose to end support on the title.

The Windows version was added to a list of supported games on GameRanger on May 31, 2014, which allows for continued online play. The game was made available through GOG.com and Steam on May 2, 2019, and multiplayer support was announced on May 1, 2020 with cross-platform play. The Xbox version is backwards compatible on Xbox 360, Xbox One and Xbox Series X/S. A remastered compilation consisting of Star Wars: Battlefront and its sequel, titled Star Wars: Battlefront Classic Collection, was released for Windows, Nintendo Switch, PlayStation 4, PlayStation 5, Xbox One, and Xbox Series X/S on March 14, 2024. Developed and published by Aspyr, the Classic Collection features cross-generation play for up to 64 players and bonus content for both games, including the Jabba's Palace map for Star Wars: Battlefront.

== Reception ==
Reception

Aggregate scores
| Aggregator | Score |
|---|---|
| GameRankings | (PS2) 83% (XBOX) 80% (PC) 78% |
| Metacritic | (PS2) 82/100 (XBOX) 80/100 (PC) 76/100 |

Review scores
| Publication | Score |
|---|---|
| AllGame | 3.5/5 (PC) |
| Edge | 8/10 |
| Electronic Gaming Monthly | 8.33/10 |
| Eurogamer | 8/10 |
| Game Informer | 8/10 |
| GamePro | 4/5 |
| GameRevolution | B |
| GameSpot | (Xbox) 8.2/10; 7.9/10 |
| GameSpy | 4/5 (PC) 3.5/5 |
| GameZone | 8.5/10 |
| IGN | (Mobile) 9/10 (Xbox) 8.5/10 (PS2) 8.4/10 (PC) 7.5/10 |
| Official U.S. PlayStation Magazine | 4.5/5 |
| Official Xbox Magazine (US) | 8.2/10 |
| PC Gamer (US) | 80% |
| The Sydney Morning Herald | 4/5 |

In the United States, Battlefront's computer version sold 290,000 copies and earned $2.6 million by August 2006, after its release in September 2004. It was the country's 65th best-selling computer game between January 2000 and August 2006. Combined sales of all Battlefront computer games released between January 2000 and August 2006 had reached 460,000 units in the United States by the latter date. By July 2006, its PlayStation 2 had sold 1.5 million copies and earned $53 million in the United States. Next Generation ranked it as the 31st highest-selling game launched for the PlayStation 2, Xbox or GameCube between January 2000 and July 2006 in that country. Combined sales of Battlefront console releases reached 3.8 million units in the United States by July 2006. Battlefront ultimately sold 4 million copies by 2007.

Upon its release, Star Wars: Battlefront received generally favorable reviews from the media. It currently holds aggregate scores at Metacritic of 76/100, 82/100, and 80/100 for the PC, PlayStation 2, and Xbox versions, respectively. Fellow aggregate website GameRankings reports similar scores of 78% for the PC, 83% for the PlayStation 2, and 80% for the Xbox version. Review scores varied from a 50% approval rating to a 94% approval across the three platforms.

GameSpot Editor Bob Colayco praised the gameplay in general, which he compared favorably with Battlefield 1942. He gave high marks to the versatility of playing modes, such as vehicle control and foot battle. He also praised the PC version for its extensive online play. Ivan Sulic of IGN praised the graphics, sound, general Star Wars setting, and online mode, but was very critical of both the AI and the single-player mode. "This is a multiplayer-centric third and first-person shooter, [which] means players who opt to stick to single player will have something to do, but won't be thrilled enough to desire extended play." He cited three major issues with the game's single player element: its easy difficulty, its lack of cohesion, and poor AI teammates and enemies. Of the AI, Sulic stated "Everyone is an idiot. The game appears to use a sort of context sensitive AI, meaning bots in the right positions will do stuff (like use turrets and vehicles and lay down cover fire), but those not immediately engaged in combat will idly stand around helping themselves to an endless breather."

GameSpy's Will Tuttle and Sal Accardo also praised the graphics and online mode, but they too criticized the single player campaign. "Historical Campaign [...] gets very confusing because you frequently switch sides from battle to battle", stated Tuttle. He added that it felt like the game's campaign was "tacked on to allow people without PS2 online to have fun." 1UP.com's Andrew Pfister followed suit, also praising the graphics. "Visually, Battlefront is exceptional. Never before have the Star Wars battles been so well recreated and detailed". He criticized the game's AI, however. He felt that it was too easy to defeat them, and that they often did not follow commands issued by the player. As with other reviewers, Pfister felt the single player mode was the weak point of the game, citing the PlayStation 2 version specifically for players without online access. Overall, he felt the problems with the game were outweighed by its qualities. "Battlefront manages to stand tall as a great game that does the best job we've yet seen of playing out the battles of the Star Wars movies."

AllGame editor William Gray gave the game a positive review, praising the control, however, mild criticism was noted for the repetitive nature of the gameplay.

Computer Games Magazine nominated Battlefront for its 2004 "Best Soundtrack" award, which ultimately went to Battlefield Vietnam.
