= Star Wars: Battlefront II (2005 video game) =

2005 action shooter video game

- Developer: Pandemic Studios (Note: PSP port developed by Savage Entertainment. Classic Collection developed by Aspyr.)
- Publisher: LucasArts (Note: Classic Collection published by Aspyr)
- Director: Eric Gewirtz
- Producer: Christopher Williams
- Designer: Peter Dellekamp Siefert
- Programmer: John Northan
- Artist: Matthew Palmer
- Writer: Michael Stemmle
- Series: Star Wars: Battlefront
- Engine: Zero
- Platforms: PlayStation 2; PlayStation Portable; Windows; Xbox; Classic Collection: Nintendo Switch; PlayStation 4; PlayStation 5; Windows; Xbox One; Xbox Series X/S
- Release: October 28, 2005: PlayStation 2, PlayStation Portable, Windows, Xbox; EU: October 28, 2005; NA: November 1, 2005; Classic Collection Windows, Nintendo Switch, PlayStation 4, PlayStation 5, Xbox One, Xbox Series X/S; WW: March 14, 2024
- Genres: Action, third-person shooter, first-person shooter
- Modes: Single-player, multiplayer

Star Wars: Battlefront II is a 2005 first and third-person shooter video game based on the Star Wars film franchise. Developed by Pandemic Studios and published by LucasArts, it is a sequel to 2004's Star Wars: Battlefront and the second installment in the Star Wars: Battlefront series. The game was released in PAL regions on October 28, 2005, on the PlayStation 2, PlayStation Portable (PSP), Microsoft Windows, and Xbox platforms, and in North America on November 1 of the same year. It was released on the PlayStation Store on October 20, 2009, for download on the PSP. The PSP version was developed by Savage Entertainment. A remastered compilation featuring both the game and its predecessor with additional content, titled Star Wars: Battlefront Classic Collection, was released on March 14, 2024.

The game features new vehicles, characters, game mechanics, maps, and missions compared to the original Battlefront. Unlike its predecessor, Battlefront II features a more narrative-based campaign, retelling portions of the Star Wars story from the point of view of a veteran clone Imperial Stormtrooper, reminiscing about his tour of duty in service of both the Galactic Republic and the Galactic Empire. Gameplay additions over Battlefront include the use of Jedi and Sith, additional game modes such as hero assault, and objective-based space battles.

Battlefront II was well received, with reviewers praising the story. Like the original game, it was a commercial success, selling 6 million copies by 2007. GameSpy Technology scheduled a shut-down across all titles using the service for May 31, 2014, which included Star Wars: Battlefront II for PC, PS2, and Xbox. Electronic Arts (EA) announced it would extend support for Battlefront II until June 30, 2014. The extended support ended on July 25, 2014, taking all GameSpy online video games across all platforms offline. The Windows version was added to a list of supported games on GameRanger on May 31, 2014, which allows for continued online play, and on October 2, 2017, multiplayer was again enabled, allowing for Steam and GOG cross-play. The Xbox version is now playable online via Insignia, and is backwards compatible on Xbox 360, Xbox One and Xbox Series X/S.

== Gameplay ==
Battlefront II is fundamentally similar to its predecessor, albeit with the addition of new gameplay mechanics, such as the ability to sprint and roll forward. The general objective in most missions is to eliminate the enemy faction, although there are game modes with a different objective, such as a capture the flag mode. Like its predecessor Star Wars Battlefront, the game is split into two eras: the Clone Wars, with battles taking place between the Galactic Republic and the Confederacy of Independent Systems, and the Galactic Civil War, where battles between the Rebel Alliance and Galactic Empire take place. Players have the ability to choose between six classes during gameplay. Four class types are common to all factions: Infantry, Heavy, Sniper and Engineer. In addition to the four standard classes, every faction has two special classes, which are exclusive to each faction and are unlocked by scoring a predetermined number of points; there is a limited number of special classes that can be on the battlefield at the same time. The special classes are the Commander and the Jet Trooper for the Republic; the MagnaGuard and the Droideka for the Confederacy of Independent Systems; the Bothan Spy and the Wookiee for the Rebels; and the Officer and the Dark Trooper for the Empire.

Battlefront II introduces a new special class—Heroes—that allows players to control iconic characters from the Star Wars universe; heroes were featured in the original Battlefront, but only as NPCs that spawned randomly during battles. Heroes are also unlocked by scoring a predetermined number of points, and are unique for every faction. Heroes serve as the most powerful class in the game and, as such, there can be a maximum of one hero for each faction on the battlefield at the same time. Each hero is available only on certain maps, although there is a team deathmatch mode, exclusive to the Mos Eisley map, that allows all heroes from all factions to compete against each other to earn points by performing kills.

=== Campaign ===
In Battlefront II players can battle in space and engage in ship-to-ship combat. Players sabotage enemy capital ships externally by firing at vital systems, or on foot by landing in the enemy hangar.

Whereas the original Battlefront's campaign featured missions dependent on the chosen faction, Battlefront II contains only one campaign, called Rise of the Empire, which is found in every version of the game except the PlayStation Portable (PSP). This set of missions is presented as the narration from a veteran of the 501st Legion, starting with the Battle of Geonosis at the beginning of the Clone Wars (as depicted in Attack of the Clones) and ending with the Battle of Hoth (as depicted in The Empire Strikes Back). There are a total of 18 missions, four of which are optional space missions.

The PSP version of Battlefront II replaces the Rise of the Empire campaign with three single-player Challenge modes: Imperial Enforcer, Rogue Assassin, and Rebel Raider. In the former, the player is sent to eliminate indigenous species on several given planets, such as Gungans on Naboo and Ewoks on Endor. Rogue Assassin requires the player to eliminate all Imperial officers on a given sets of planets. Bonus points are awarded for any other kills. Finally, Rebel Raider tasks the player with locating specific objects in a map and returning them to a designated drop point, similar to Capture the flag.

=== Galactic Conquest ===
Like its predecessor, Battlefront II includes Galactic Conquest. In this mode, the player commands a fleet throughout the galaxy conquering and protecting planets, much like a game of Risk. When two opposing forces reach the same planet, the game switches to the traditional perspective, and the player must eliminate the enemy faction to gain control of that planet. Players gain credits for performing well which can be used to buy new character classes, a new fleet, or bonuses that provide additional support when attacking or defending a planet. While the PlayStation 2 and Xbox versions allow cooperative and competitive battles in Galactic Conquest mode through split-screen gameplay, the PC version does not.

=== Instant Action ===
In Instant Action players can choose from any of the game's 24 maps, as well as any available eras and modes. Four other modes are included in addition to the traditional Conquest mode that was found in Star Wars: Battlefront; Hunt mode, Capture the Flag (CTF), which is available in 1-flag and 2-flag variants, Hero Assault and Space Assault.

In Conquest mode, players are required to capture and hold strategic points on the map, known in the game as command posts. Players capture command posts by standing near one until its holograph transitions to blue, indicating it is held by their forces. Players can capture both enemy command posts, which are designated red, and neutral command posts, which are white. For enemy command posts, enemy units can continue to spawn in the area until the post is de-energized and turns white. When all command posts belong to a given team, a twenty-second timer begins in which the opposing team must de-energize a command post or they lose. Alternatively, if one team eliminates all opposing reinforcements, they win.

In Hunt mode, players take on the role of the species indigenous to the chosen planet, or of a faction opposed to that species. The object when playing as the indigenous species is to repel the opposition, or to eliminate the indigenous species if playing as the opposing faction. In 1-flag CTF, both teams attempt to take a common flag and capture it at the enemy's base. This mode is the only one available on ground maps as well as in space. 2-flag CTF tasks players with stealing the enemy's flag and returning it to their base for points.

In Hero Assault, players control iconic Star Wars characters which are divided into two teams, heroes and villains. The sole objective is to be the first team to reach the number of required points, with each kill granting one point. Space Assault allows players to control a starfighter in order to destroy critical systems on the enemy's capital ship or destroy other enemy starfighters for points. The systems of an enemy capital ship can be destroyed in a starfighter by firing at key areas of the ship. Alternatively, players can land in the enemy hangar and sabotage critical systems internally. The game ends when one team has reached the required number of total points.

== Plot ==
The game's campaign mode is told as an autobiography of an unknown clone trooper veteran who recounts the many battles of the 501st Legion. Originally part of the Grand Army of the Republic, the 501st are first deployed during the Battle of Geonosis at the beginning of the Clone Wars, where they capture a Separatist outpost occupied by battle droids and Geonosians. Over the following three years, the legion prove themselves as one of the most efficient in the Clone Army, and are assigned important missions throughout the Clone Wars.

Near the end of the war, the 501st are sent to Mygeeto to aid the 21st Nova Corps, led by Jedi General Ki-Adi Mundi, with the destruction of a Separatist energy generator. Unbeknownst to the Jedi, the clones receive special orders from Supreme Chancellor Palpatine to collect a sample of the generator after its destruction, which would later be used to help power the planet-destroying battle station known as the "Death Star". Following this, the 501st return to Coruscant, which has been attacked by Separatist forces commanded by General Grievous. The clones are ordered to clear the path for Anakin Skywalker and Obi-Wan Kenobi to board Grievous' flagship and rescue a captured Palpatine. Next, the 501st are assigned to serve under General Aayla Secura on Felucia, where they defend a damaged AT-TE from several Acklays and Separatist forces in the area. Afterward, the 501st travel to Kashyyyk to clear a path through the Separatist blockade and defend a key Wookiee village.

Shortly after their victory on Kashyyyk, part of the 501st are sent to Utapau to assist the 212th Attack Battalion with the capture of a major Separatist stronghold. Upon their return to Coruscant, Palpatine issues Order 66, which brands all Jedi as traitors to the Republic and orders their summary executions. Under the command of the newly christened Sith Lord Darth Vader, the 501st storm the Jedi Temple to kill all its occupants, while the remaining Jedi who are spread across the galaxy are swiftly murdered by their clone troopers, effectively wiping out the Jedi Order. Meanwhile, Palpatine declares the end of the Clone Wars and the Republic's reorganization into the Galactic Empire.

Now part of the Imperial Army as Darth Vader's personal legion, the 501st are assigned various missions to solidify the Empire's rule. These include forcing a regime change on Naboo by assassinating the Queen, destroying a reactivated droid factory on Mustafar, and eliminating the Kaminoans' new batch of rogue clones. Following the Kamino incident, the Empire halts clone production, and clone troopers are slowly replaced by stormtroopers. The 501st remains one of the few Imperial legions to consist mostly of former clone troopers.

Roughly nineteen years after the end of the Clone Wars, the Empire has been firmly established in the ashes of the Republic. With the galaxy seemingly at peace, the 501st are stationed on the Death Star, but during watch, a prison break is initiated and a group of Rebel prisoners manage to escape with the battle station's schematics. Tasked with recovering them, the 501st attack a Rebel outpost on Polis Massa, and eventually track them down to the Rebel Blockade Runner Tantive IV. Although the 501st manage to kill or capture everyone aboard, including Rebel leader Princess Leia Organa, whom they deliver to Vader, they fail to retrieve the stolen schematics, which are eventually delivered to the Rebel Alliance. Using the schematics to find a weakness in the Death Star, the Alliance leads a successful assault to destroy it. The Empire retaliates by attacking the Alliance's base on Yavin IV, which the 501st captures, avenging their brothers who died in the Death Star's destruction.

Three years later, the Empire locates another Rebel base on Hoth. Tasked with wiping out the weakened Rebel Alliance, the 501st capture the base and destroy most of the evacuating transports. This crushing defeat marks what appears to be the end of the Alliance. The narrator ends the story by stating that the Death Star was eventually rebuilt and the Empire's grip on the galaxy became stronger than ever, all thanks to the efforts of the 501st Legion.

== Development ==
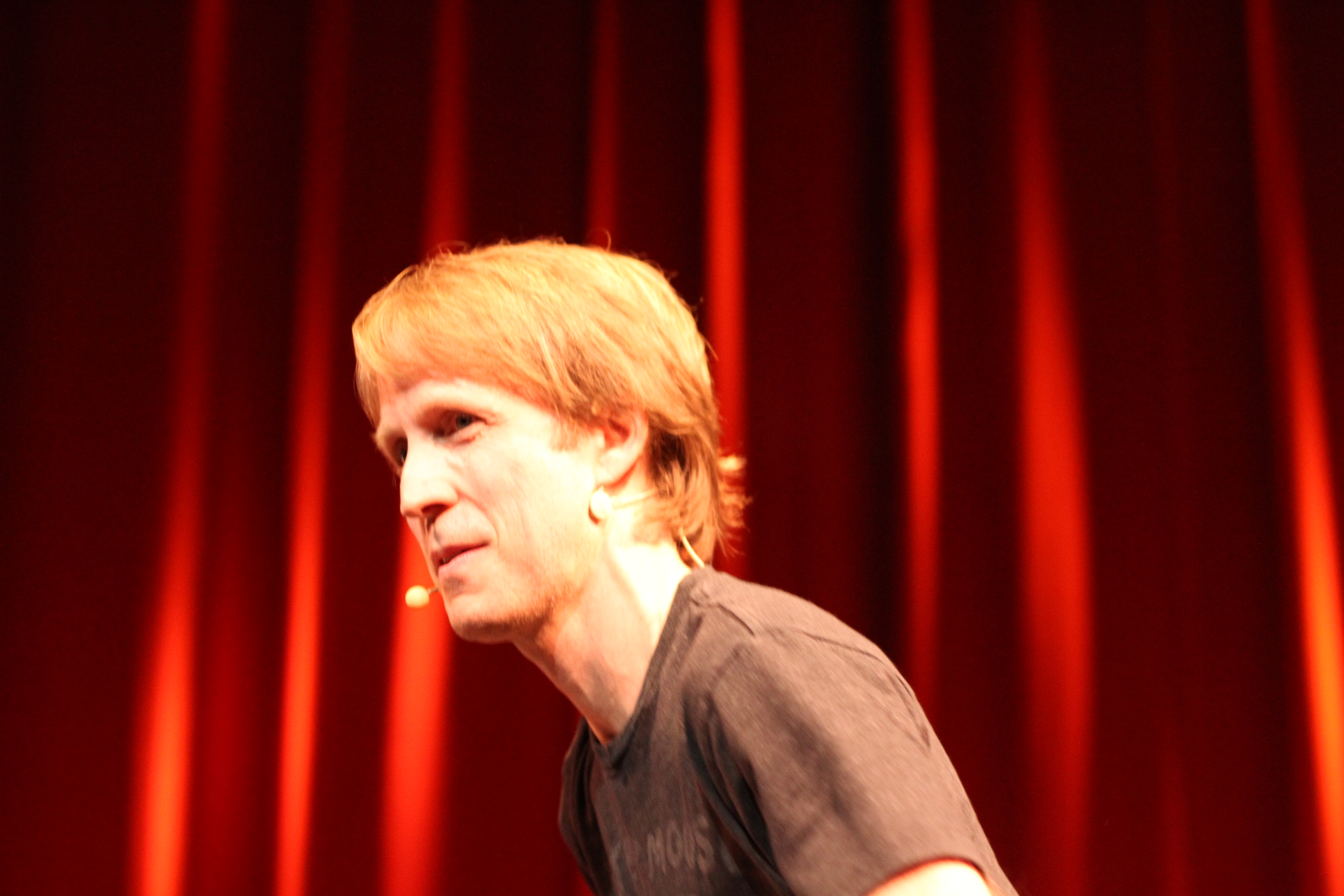
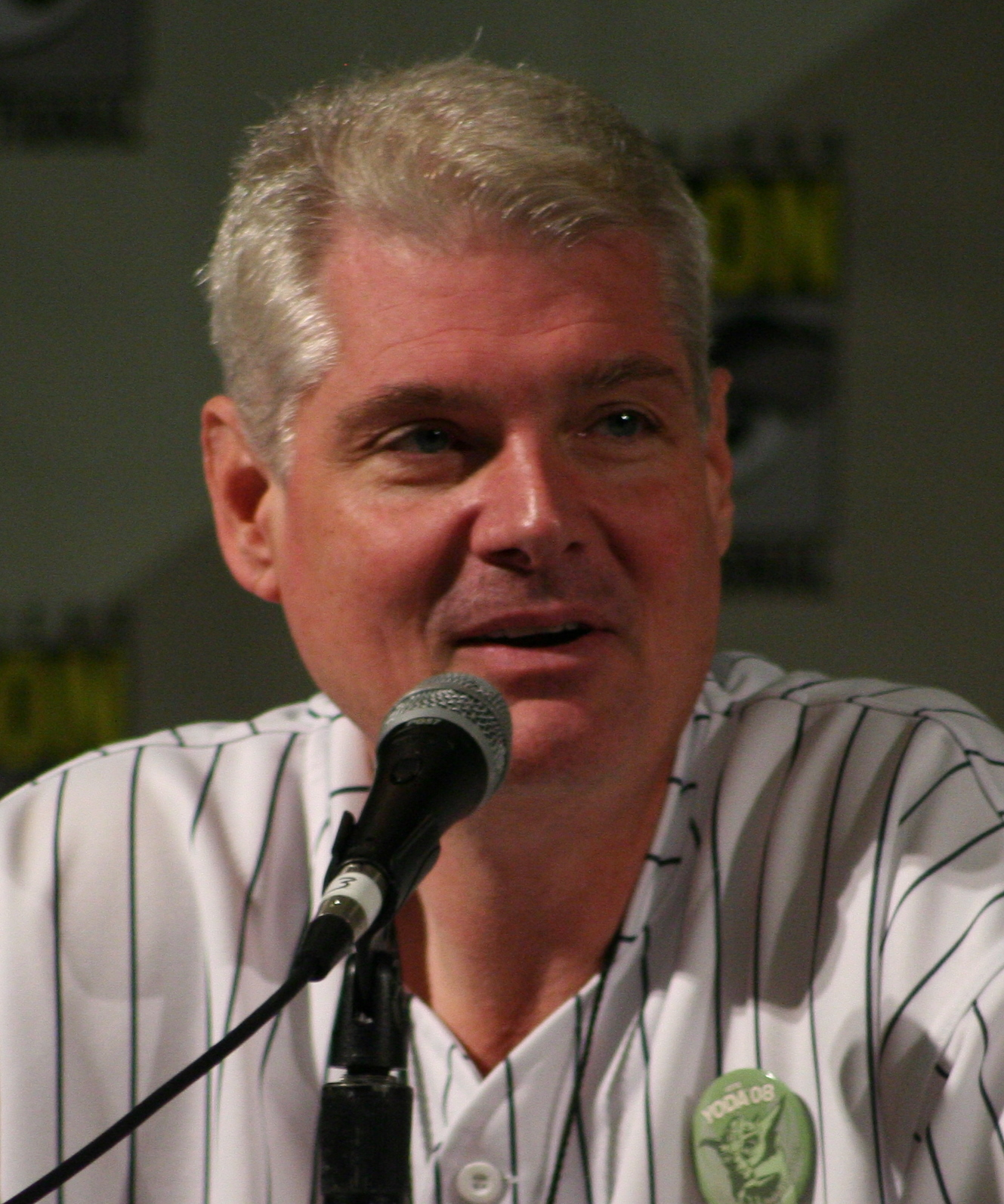
James Arnold Taylor (top) and Tom Kane (bottom) return to voice Obi-Wan Kenobi and Yoda in Star Wars: Battlefront II. The actors have voiced these roles several times in the Star Wars universe.

Star Wars: Battlefront II was announced on April 21, 2005, during Star Wars Celebration III held in Indianapolis, Indiana. Developer Pandemic Studios used their in-house engine, known as Zero to develop Battlefront II. The engine was used in Pandemic's other two Star Wars titles, Star Wars: The Clone Wars and the game's predecessor, Star Wars: Battlefront. As with Battlefront, Lua was utilized as the game's scripting language. Battlefront II's release date would be set to coincide with the DVD release of Revenge of the Sith, similar to how Battlefront coincided with the release of the original trilogy on DVD. An Xbox demo of Battlefront II was also included on the Revenge of the Sith extras DVD to further promote the game. LucasArts looked to the fans for inspiration for Battlefront II, browsing forums and using other means to provide feedback for the sequel. Josh Resnick, founder of Pandemic Studios noted that it was difficult to get assets from Revenge of the Sith in order to build the related in-game assets. Peter Hirschmann, vice president of product development at LucasArts, detailed the immense efforts required to get the game to a playable state on the PlayStation Portable. "It was a huge 'pop the champagne' day if you got back one whole frame a second," he stated. LucasArts Engineers working on Indiana Jones and Star Wars development teams were brought in to help optimize game code. A compilation of the title and its predecessor, titled Star Wars Battlefront Classic Collection, was released for Windows, Nintendo Switch, PlayStation 4, PlayStation 5, Xbox One, and Xbox Series X/S on March 14, 2024. The compilation was developed by Aspyr and features cross-generation play (PS4 with PS5; Xbox One with Xbox Series X/S) for up to 64 players, and includes the Xbox downloadable content.

Bob Bergen voices Luke Skywalker, having voice doubled for Mark Hamill in previous Star Wars games such as the Star Wars: Rogue Squadron series. Voice actor Corey Burton recorded lines for Count Dooku, a role he has played in other Star Wars games as well as the Star Wars: The Clone Wars animated series. Obi-Wan Kenobi is portrayed by James Arnold Taylor, who played the role in the cartoon series. Scott Lawrence also returns to voice Darth Vader, a role he has portrayed since the 1994 game Star Wars: TIE Fighter. Other veteran Star Wars voice actors such as Tom Kane, Steve Blum and T.C. Carson also provide voice overs. Temuera Morrison portrays his signature roles Boba Fett, Jango Fett and the game's clone trooper narrator, but does not provide the in-game clone chatter as he did in Battlefront.

On February 15, 2006, Pandemic released a patch for the PC version, which included support for mods and general improvement to the game. Mod tools for the Windows version of the game were subsequently released on February 21, 2006. Included in the download were many of the game's assets, several tutorials, and the tools required to make content for the PC version of the game. A plugin for Softimage XSI included in the mod tools allows users to create new 3D models and animations for the game. The Battlefront II mod tools provide a wider range of capabilities to the end user than the original Battlefront, allowing a user to create anything from user interface changes, to additional gameplay levels, to large-scale modifications. The original assets used to build the retail version of the game were shipped with the mod tool package that was released and allowed users to either modify an existing level or create an entirely new map from scratch. Subsequently, modifications have been created which expand the game further into the Star Wars expanded universe, adding additional locales, characters, Star Wars eras, and fan-created stories.

On December 19, 2005, LucasArts released the first of two downloadable packages for the Xbox version of Battlefront II. The free content added the Hero Assault mode to Kashyyyk. Another Xbox Live download was made available on January 31, 2006, which added two new hero characters, Kit Fisto and Asajj Ventress, as well as four maps from the original Star Wars: Battlefront; Yavin 4: Arena, Bespin: Cloud City, Rhen Var Harbor and Rhen Var Citadel. In addition, Hero Assault modes were also added to Coruscant, Mygeeto, and Naboo. It sold for USD $4.99. The downloadable content is no longer available as the original Xbox Live servers were shut down on April 15, 2010. Star Wars: Battlefront II is playable online on the original Xbox with Insignia, the replacement Xbox Live servers. In late March 2006, the game was added to the Backwards Compatibility List for the Xbox 360, and is now playable on both the original Xbox and the Xbox 360.

On May 4, 2014, it was announced that the Star Wars: Battlefront II Online servers hosted by GameSpy were closing down on May 31, 2014. The Windows version was added to a list of supported games on GameRanger on May 31, 2014, which allows for continued online play. On October 2, 2017, a patch for the Windows version of the game re-enabled multiplayer and added Steam and GOG cross-platform play; a second patch on January 3, 2018, had minor bug fixes and performance optimizations. A Disney spokesperson told Polygon that GOG was "handling the back end for the game's online play, including the development of patches". The Xbox version was made backwards compatible on Xbox One and Xbox series X/S.

== Reception and sales ==
Reception

Aggregate scores
Aggregator	Score
GameRankings	(PS2) 84% (XBOX) 84% (PC) 75% (PSP) 71%
Metacritic	(PS2) 84/100 (XBOX) 83/100 (PC) 78/100 (PSP) 69/100

Review scores
Publication	Score
Electronic Gaming Monthly	8.17/10 (PSP) 6.33/10
Eurogamer	6/10
Game Informer	8.5/10 (PSP) 7/10
GamePro	4.5/5
GameRevolution	B
GameSpot	8.1/10 (PC) 7.8/10 (PSP) 6.8/10
GameSpy	4.5/5 (PC & PSP) 3.5/5
GameZone	(PS2) 8.4/10 (Xbox) 8.2/10 (PC) 8/10 (PSP) 7.9/10
IGN	(PSP) 7.8/10; 7/10
Official U.S. PlayStation Magazine	(PS2) 4.5/5 (PSP) 3/5
Official Xbox Magazine (US)	8.5/10
PC Gamer (US)	83%
CiN Weekly	92/100
Detroit Free Press	3/4

Battlefront II was well received overall. The highest aggregate scored was for the PlayStation 2, which holds an 84% at GameRankings and an 84/100 at Metacritic. The Xbox version ranked similarly, with 84% at GameRankings and 83/100 at Metacritic. The PC and PSP versions scored slightly lower, with a 75% and a 78/100 for the PC and the PSP a 71% and 69/100 at GameRankings and Metacritic, respectively. It placed sixth in overall sales for 2005, according to the NPD Group. The PlayStation Portable version sold over 500,000 copies. It was listed as the second most-played Xbox title in 2007, and placed third in 2008. In 2009 Star Wars: Battlefront II reclaimed second place once more. The PlayStation 2 version received a "Platinum" sales award from the Entertainment and Leisure Software Publishers Association (ELSPA), indicating sales of at least 300,000 copies in the United Kingdom. The game's sales totaled 6 million copies by 2007.

Battlefront II was praised not only for having a much more engaging single-player storyline, but also for fixing many of the issues that plagued the original. Reviewers noted a slight improvement in the intelligence of AI units and praised new varied objectives to obtain victory. PlayStation World argued the strengthened single-player campaign was "unrelenting" and always a good challenge. Publications found the inclusion of space battles a welcome addition; however, GameSpot argued the addition of Jedi, though looking "good on paper", did not end up "feeling as epic" as expected.

Game Revolution argued if the multiplayer was taken away, even the new campaign was not enough to make Battlefront II worth the buy. IGN claimed the game suffers from problems remaining from the original Battlefront, such as a lack of challenging AI characters in single-player mode. Computer-controlled opponents and allies tend to run headlong into gunfire, wander off ledges, and walk into walls. IGN felt that these, along with redundant use of planets featured in previous Star Wars settings, were problems carried over from the original. X-Play hosts Adam Sessler and Morgan Webb gave the game a 4 out of 5, but criticized the online multiplayer.

Non-video game publications praised the quality of the game. CiN Weekly gave it a score of 92 out of 100 and stated "The improved single-player games are worthwhile enough on their own, but if you can find well connected online matches, multiplayer games will keep you addicted for months." The Sydney Morning Herald gave it a score of four stars out of five, saying, "Space conflict complements ground-based action beautifully and jumping into the cockpit of an X-wing or TIE fighter is thrilling." Detroit Free Press gave the Xbox version a score of three stars out of four and said "The graphics are pretty, the score divine, the story-driven single-player game is actually cinematic and engaging and the lag, while annoying at times online, has been greatly reduced from the original."
