= Stormtrooper (Star Wars) =

Fictional soldiers in the Star Wars franchise

Stormtroopers
- Star Wars characters
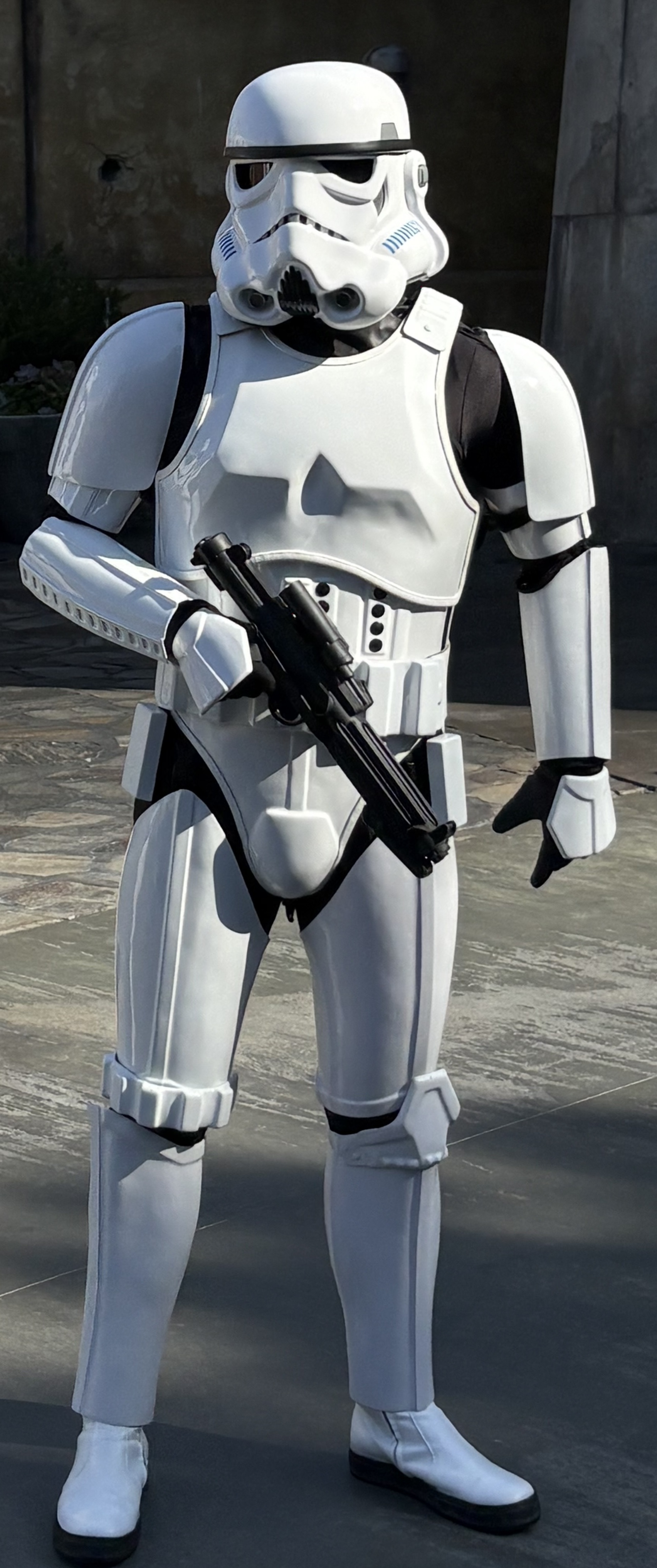
- An actor performing as an Imperial stormtrooper at Star Wars: Galaxy's Edge in Disneyland
- First appearance: Star Wars: From the Adventures of Luke Skywalker (1976 novel); Star Wars (1977 film)
- Created by: George Lucas

In-universe information
- Species: Human
- Occupation: Soldiers
- Affiliation: Galactic Empire; First Order; Sith Eternal

Stormtroopers are fictional soldiers in the Star Wars franchise created by George Lucas. Introduced in the original Star Wars film trilogy (1977–1983), the Stormtroopers are the shock troops/space marines of the autocratic Galactic Empire. Their predecessors, the clone troopers of the Galactic Republic, were used by Emperor Palpatine to take over the government and exterminate the Jedi. After the fall of the Empire, as depicted in the original trilogy, Stormtroopers remained in service to Imperial remnants, such as the First Order.

The order of battle of the Stormtrooper Corps is unspecified in the Star Wars universe. Accompanying the Imperial Navy, Stormtroopers are able to be deployed swiftly and respond to states of civil unrest or insurrection, act as a planetary garrison, and police areas within the Galactic Empire. They are shown in collective groups of varying organizational sizes ranging from squads to legions and, for some, their armour and training are modified for special operations and environments.

== Development ==
In early drafts of the original Star Wars film (Note: Later titled Star Wars: Episode IV – A New Hope) as well as designs by conceptual artist Ralph McQuarrie, stormtroopers wield lightsabers and handheld shields as common weapons, as opposed to the former being mainly limited to the Jedi and Sith factions. While outlining his franchise in 1977, George Lucas said there were numerous female stormtroopers in some units, but few were stationed on the Death Star.

=== Performers ===
While stormtrooper performers like Michael Leader (Episode IV), David Field, Laurie Goode (Episode IV), Peter Diamond (Episode IV-VI), Stephen Bayley (Episode IV), Bill Weston (Episode IV), Chris Bunn (Episode IV-VI), and Alan Flyng (Episode V) and voice actors like Terry McGovern, Scott Beach, Colin Michael Kitchens, Jerry Walter and Morgan Upton have generally been uncredited in the film series, there have been a few exceptions.

In Attack of the Clones (2002) and Revenge of the Sith (2005), the clone troopers, which serve as the basis of what would initially become the Empire's stormtrooper force, were computer-generated images and voiced by Temuera Morrison, who played the bounty hunter Jango Fett, the template of the clone army. The child clone troopers were played by Daniel Logan, who also played Jango's clone son Boba Fett, and the clone troopers as young men were played by Bodie Taylor, who was cast for his resemblance to a younger Morrison. In Revenge of the Sith, Morrison also played Commander Cody, the only named clone trooper who is seen unmasked in the prequel trilogy.

In The Force Awakens (2015), John Boyega stars as Finn, the former Stormtrooper FN-2187 who defects from the First Order and joins the Resistance, and Gwendoline Christie portrays Captain Phasma, commander of the First Order's stormtroopers. Daniel Craig has a small uncredited role as a stormtrooper whom Rey compels using the Jedi mind trick to let her escape from captivity, and director J. J. Abrams also cast Alias and Lost composer Michael Giacchino as FN-3181, and Radiohead producer Nigel Godrich as FN-9330. A riot control stormtrooper who calls Finn a traitor during the battle on Takodana, portrayed by stunt performer Liang Yang and voiced by sound editor David Acord, is identified as FN-2199 "Nines" in the anthology book Star Wars: Before the Awakening (2015) by Greg Rucka. The trooper, armed with a "Z6 baton" and dubbed "TR-8R" by fans, quickly inspired multiple memes and fan art. Actor/director Kevin Smith also voiced a stormtrooper in the Takodana sequence.

In Star Wars Rebels, different voice actors have provided the voices of the stormtroopers, including David Acord, Dee Bradley Baker, Steven Blum, Clancy Brown, Robin Atkin Downes, Greg Ellis, Dave Fennoy, Dave Filoni, Tom Kane, Andrew Kishino, Phil LaMarr, Liam O'Brien, Freddie Prinze, Jr., André Sogliuzzo, Stephen Stanton, Greg Weisman, Gary Anthony Williams, and Matthew Wood.

In Ralph Breaks the Internet, the stormtroopers in the "Oh My Disney" website are voiced by Jesse Averna, Kevin Deters, Jeremy Milton, and Rich Moore.

Jason Sudeikis and Adam Pally play scout troopers in "Chapter 8: Redemption", the 2019 first-season finale episode of The Mandalorian.

== Background ==
=== Skywalker saga ===
Introduced in Star Wars (1977), the Imperial stormtroopers serve as the army of the Galactic Empire, establishing the Imperial authority and putting down any revolts.

In the prequel film Star Wars: Episode II – Attack of the Clones (2002), the first clone troopers are cloned from bounty hunter Jango Fett, to be the Army of the Republic in the Clone Wars. In Episode III: Revenge of the Sith (2005), Chancellor Palpatine orders them to slay their Jedi generals in the Great Jedi Purge. After the change in regimes from the Galactic Republic to the Galactic Empire, the clone troopers who had served the Republic became the first generation of stormtroopers, enforcing the Emperor's will as military units, and law enforcement, policing the Emperor's ever increasingly oppressive laws.

The Imperial Stormtrooper Corps swell in size in The Bad Batch (2021–2024) after Palpatine almost completely replaces the clones with recruits and conscripts of the Empire, though the replacement of clones with natural beings lowered the effectiveness of the Empire's soldiers. With the Empire firmly stabilized and an Imperial Army and Navy established, the stormtroopers are integrated into Palpatine's personal army and stationed on Imperial bases and cruisers, as well as on the Death Star.

As established in The Force Awakens (2015), after Palpatine's death, stormtroopers continue to serve under the factions that broke apart from the Empire. With redesigned armor, they eventually serve under the leadership of the First Order. In the First Order, an undisclosed number of stormtroopers are abducted as young children, given serial numbers for names and mentally conditioned for loyal service. Stormtrooper FN-2187, later known as Finn, plans his escape when his resistance to this conditioning puts him in line to be reprogrammed. Additionally, Rey's goggles were based on scavenged stormtrooper lenses.

=== Other appearances ===
The streaming series The Mandalorian, which is set after the fall of the Empire, portrays stormtroopers as freelance mercenaries in the service of Moff Gideon, a former officer of the Imperial Security Bureau.

Star Wars Legends media such as games and comics feature a number of specialized stormtrooper units. The Marvel-produced comics of the late 1970s and early 1980s featured Shadow Troopers. Other specialists have included commandos and troopers equipped to work in the vacuum of outer space, such as the zero gravity Spacetroopers depicted engaging in extra vehicular battle in the 1991 novel Star Wars: Heir to the Empire, and its 1995 Dark Horse Comics adaptation.

A distinct variant known as "Shadowtroopers" appear in Star Wars Jedi Knight II: Jedi Outcast, wearing black armour that incorporates a lightsaber-resistant mineral called cortosis. As a project of the Dark Jedi named Desann aligned with a Remnant of the Empire, the Shadowtroopers themselves had been immersed in a Force nexus on Ruusan, temporarily empowering them with Force sensitivity. This armour has a green synthetic gem set into the breastplate which sustained the otherwise temporary effect of their Force empowerment and combines with their abilities to render them near-invisible, with only a faint area of blue discoloration giving them away. In conjunction with their Force-granted telekinesis, reflexes, and agility, the Shadowtroopers are armed and trained in the use of mass-produced red lightsabers. Their combination of abilities allow them to lie in wait and ambush the enemy, representing formidable opponents even for trained Jedi, most often the game's Jedi protagonist, Kyle Katarn. Shadow stormtroopers appear in Star Wars: The Force Unleashed and wear exactly the same type of Phase III armor as normal stormtroopers but not white in color, but rather a mixture of silver, grey and red detailing. These troopers also possess the invisible feature and use this tactic to ambush their enemies, but only if stormtrooper officers call out for support.

In Lego Star Wars II: The Original Trilogy, Speedo-clad and stormtrooper-helmet-wearing "Beach Troopers" appear relaxing at the beach. In Lego Star Wars: The Complete Saga, they also wear life jackets.

Stormtroopers made their canonical debut in the Star Wars: The Bad Batch Season 1 episode "War–Mantle", which was released on July 30, 2021.

== Description ==
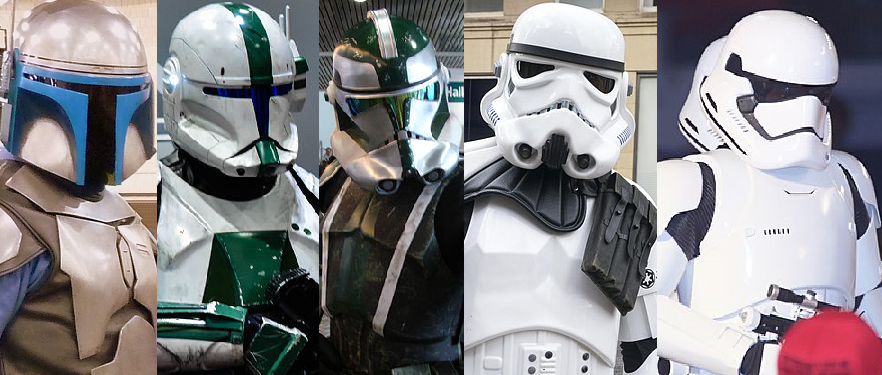
Evolution of clone trooper & stormtrooper armour, illustrated by cosplayers. Left to right: 1. Modern Mandalorian (Jango Fett); 2. Phase I clone trooper (RC-1140 "Fixer"); 3. Phase II clone trooper (Commander Gree); 4. Imperial stormtrooper; 5. First Order stormtrooper

According to Star Wars lore, Imperial stormtroopers are men and women who have been recruited (or conscripted) at a young age to serve as expendable foot soldiers of the Empire, gradually replacing clone troopers as their accelerated aging forces them to retire. These recruits are trained at Imperial Academies spread out across the galaxy where they undergo intense conditioning that instills fierce loyalty, strict discipline and ruthless efficiency while removing any sense of individualism or empathy. As the backbone of the Imperial Army, stormtroopers are dreaded for their brutality, carrying out atrocities in the name of Emperor Palpatine, and their fanaticism, engaging the enemy with no regard to casualties. Inevitably, some use their position for personal gain against a civilian population too terrified to resist. However, inconsistencies in academy standards led to stormtroopers of varying combat skill and ability compared to the superior clone troopers, which, among other things, can be seen in the stormtroopers' mainly variable, sometimes even weak, ability to hit the target in firefights. They are especially inept at hitting main characters in the movies. After subduing any remaining Separatist holdouts left over from the Clone Wars, stormtroopers primarily serve as an internal security and peacekeeping force until the Galactic Civil War where they start to engage the Rebel Alliance in large-scale battles.

Unable to conscript sufficient number of soldiers to fill its stormtrooper ranks, and unwilling to switch back to using rapidly produced clone troopers, The First Order recruits stormtroopers from infancy. They are raised, trained and indoctrinated for military service, with soldiers and crews undergoing combat training in war games and simulations. They are regularly put through mental indoctrination and propaganda programs, to reinforce obedience and loyalty to the First Order. Rather than using personal names, stormtroopers are generally identified by alphanumeric designations, such as "FN-2187".

=== Equipment ===
Standard Imperial stormtrooper armor is white and has a utility belt and a helmet.

==== Weapons ====
The standard firearm for Imperial stormtroopers is the BlasTech E-11 blaster rifle, described in Star Wars sources as combining excellent range and firepower in a compact and rugged design. Features include a telescopic range-finding sight, accessory mounting rail, power setting adjuster, three-point folding stock, magnatomic adhesive pistol grip, and advanced cooling system. Plasma cartridges provide enough gas for 500 shots, though a standard power cell which energizes the gas to produce blaster bolts will last for approximately 100 shots. In addition to the E-11, stormtroopers employ a variety of different weapons as seen in the Star Wars films and other media. Examples include thermal detonators, sniper rifles, crew-served heavy repeating blasters, and mortars.

Both firing and non-firing prop models of the E-11 were based on the Mk 4 Sterling submachine gun, with approximately 20 models built for the first Star Wars movie A New Hope. External modifications to the Sterlings to transform them into blaster rifles varied based on the parts available but most were similar in design. This included an American Mk38 azimuth tank scope and a Hengstler industrial counter box affixed to the top and left side of the receiver respectively. The Sterling would continue to serve as the basis for or inspire other blaster rifle designs in the rest of the Star Wars films.

Background literature explains how the First Order's stormtroopers were armed in secret by the Sonn-Blas Corporation, a subsidiary of BlasTech Industries and Merr-Sonn Munitions created to circumvent the New Republic's disarmament treaties. Building on classic design templates, they are meant to possess greater battlefield accuracy, ammunition yields and operational lifespans. Examples include the F-11D blaster rifle, SE-44C blaster pistol, and FWMB-10 repeating blaster cannon. For subduing civilian populations, First Order stormtroopers will also carry ballistic riot shields and riot control batons.

==== Armor ====
As established in the original Star Wars trilogy of films, the troopers' most distinctive equipment is their white battle armor, which completely encases the body and typically has no individually distinguishing markings. According to in-universe reference material, this armor was developed and manufactured by the Imperial Department of Military Research, and consists of 18 white plastoid armor plates magnatomically attached to a black body glove. These plates are generally impervious to most projectile weapons and blast shrapnel, and will protect against glancing hits by other blaster rifles though a direct hit will penetrate. The armor also provides protection against inhospitable environments, including the vacuum of space for a short period of time. Their helmets are fitted with filtration systems for polluted environments, with hookups for incorporating an external atmospheric tank while operating in space or to filter potent toxins. The helmets also include built-in communication system and multi-frequency targeting and acquisition system linked to in-lens displays that provide tactical information, protection from excessive brightness, and vision modes for seeing through smoke, fire and darkness.

Based on conceptual drawings by Ralph McQuarrie, Liz Moore and Nick Pemberton sculpted designs for the helmet, while Brian Muir sculpted armor pieces for the stormtrooper costume. Muir, who was also responsible for sculpting the Darth Vader costume, worked out of the Art Department at Elstree Studios. The suit was molded and initially cast in plaster, with Muir sharpening the detail at the plaster stage. The plaster casts were then remolded and cast in fiberglass to use as the "tools" for the vacuum forming process. The suits were produced in house by Tashy Baines, the resident vacuum former, but then a problem developed with the machine. As Shepperton Design Studios had already been used to vacuum form the helmets, the fiberglass molds for the armor were then sent to them for vacuum forming the suits. By the end of production, two different helmets were produced; one for the common stunt trooper and a second design for close-ups. Fifty stunt helmets were produced in white-painted HDPE and six hero helmets were produced in white ABS plastic. Besides the material used, the two designs can be differentiated by differences in the eyes, the ears, and the mouth area.

The copyright status of the armor design has undergone legal challenges. A 2004 lawsuit by Lucasfilm against one of the original prop designers, Andrew Ainsworth, who had been selling helmet replicas, confirmed the design to be under copyright in the US. However, a 2011 UK court decision in Ainsworth's favor deemed the costume to be industrial design, which is protected there only for 15 years. This puts the armor design in the public domain in the UK, and likely throughout the European Union.

To differentiate the First Order stormtroopers from their earlier Imperial counterparts, the helmet and armor were redesigned for the 2015 film Star Wars: The Force Awakens by costume designer Michael Kaplan with input from director J. J. Abrams. Within the Star Wars setting, this armor is described as being an improvement over the previous iteration, including better joint design for greater flexibility, stronger betaplast armor plating, and upgraded helmet communication and targeting systems.

=== 501st Legion ===
The 501st Legion Elite Stormtrooper Unit, or "Vader's Fist", is a stormtrooper unit from the Star Wars movies and Star Wars Legends continuity. Commanded by the ruthlessly cunning General Maximilian Veers and composed of the best trained soldiers in the Star Wars galaxy, the legion earned a fierce reputation for completing missions considered unwinnable or suicidal. The 501st serves as Darth Vader's personal death squadron, whom he notably leads in the Jedi extermination. The 501st spearhead the assault upon the Tantive IV consular ship, and capture Princess Leia. During the Battle of Hoth, the 501st is instrumental in the destruction of the Rebel Alliance base, and nearly succeeds in capturing the Millennium Falcon. The 501st participated in the Battle of Endor, though they would meet their demise alongside Darths Sidious and Vader as well as the second Death Star. Most of the background story linked to the 501st comes from Star Wars novels, the games Star Wars: Battlefront II and Star Wars: The Force Unleashed, and the TV show Star Wars: The Clone Wars.

The elite 501st designation is resurrected by Grand Admiral Thrawn, who in the Thrawn trilogy is charged with the defense of the "Empire of the Hand" Imperial Remnant forces. Thrawn's 501st is composed of aliens and humans.

The Legion's name is based on a fan organization of the same name; their inclusion in the official continuity was based on the worldwide organization's dedication to Star Wars fandom.

=== Specialists ===
Within the Star Wars franchise, several types of "military occupation specialist" stormtrooper units are seen. These include:

==== Imperial variants ====
- Sandtroopers are first seen on the desert world of Tatooine during Star Wars (1977). They are trained to serve in arid environments and their armor is equipped with cooling units, anti-glare lenses, extra rations, and water supplies. Sandtroopers can be distinguished by their colored pauldrons which indicate rank: black for enlisted, white for sergeants, and orange for unit leaders. Sandtroopers that ride Dewbacks are known as Dewback riders.
- Snowtroopers, also known as cold weather assault stormtroopers, are first seen during the battle of Hoth in The Empire Strikes Back (1980). Their armor is insulated against cold weather and modified with polarized snow goggles, a heated breather mask, insulated belt cape and ice boots. Battery packs can keep their systems powered for up to two weeks, while additional cold-weather gear is carried including grappling hooks, ion flares and homing beacons.

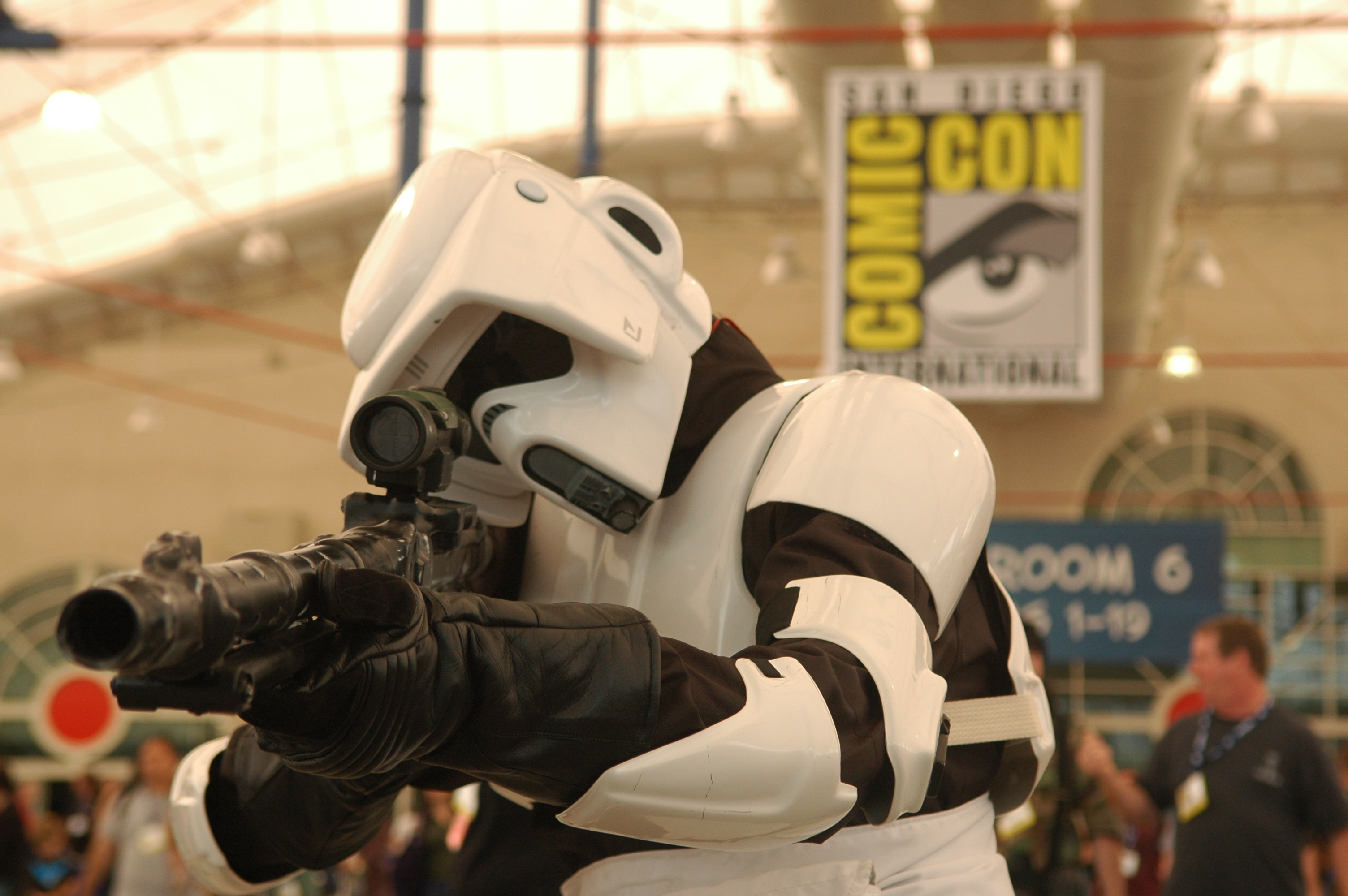
Cosplay of scout trooper

- Scout troopers are first seen on Endor in Return of the Jedi (1983). They are trained in advanced reconnaissance and with an unusual degree of independence so they can serve as scouts and snipers far from Imperial support. Their armor is lighter than standard stormtrooper suits, with protection only covering the upper body and head, while their helmets incorporate a boosted communication system and enhanced macrobinocular viewplate for spotting targets at long range. On Endor, scout troopers piloted swift 74-Z speeder bikes to patrol the area around the Death Star II's shield generator.
- Shock troopers are an upgraded variant of the Clone Shock Troopers, the red-armored clone troopers, who first appeared in Revenge of the Sith (2005). They patrol government facilities and serve as bodyguards for Emperor Palpatine and those closest to him.
- Death troopers are elite soldiers of Imperial Intelligence who make their first appearance in Rogue One: A Star Wars Story (2016). Undergoing rigorous training and receiving top-secret augmentations which boost their performance beyond human limitations, death troopers are assigned to defend VIPs such as Commander-in-Chief Darth Vader, Grand Moff Tarkin, Director Orson Krennic, Grand Admiral Thrawn and Moff Gideon, and take part in operations involving stealth and espionage. Their black, classified armor monitors biofeedback implants in their bodies and can stimulate sensory organs for increased performance, features targeting systems far superior to standard stormtrooper versions, and is sprayed with a polymer called "reflec" that warps electromagnetic waves to defeat enemy sensors. Death trooper helmets have built-in vocal scramblers that enable their wearers to communicate in an encrypted language intelligible only to other death troopers. The in-universe origin for their name is that it was specially chosen by Emperor Palpatine to play on rumors of an Imperial project to reanimate dead tissue. The Star Wars novel Death Troopers, part of the non-canon Legends continuity, revolves around the outbreak of a zombie virus aboard an Imperial Star Destroyer.
- Shoretroopers, also known as coastal defender stormtroopers, are introduced in Rogue One, where they are seen patrolling the beaches and bunkers of Scarif. They are described as uncommon stormtrooper specialists trained for combat in coastal environments on tropical worlds. Their armor is flexible and lightweight, designed to withstand corrosive aquatic environments and repel excess moisture, and can be modified to operate underwater. Shoretroopers are generally of sergeant rank or higher and command squads of other stormtroopers during instances of seaside combat. Shoretroopers returned in "Chapter 15: The Believer" of The Mandalorian, in which they serve in an Imperial remnant stationed at a mining facility on Morak. as well as appearing in Episode 7 of Andor on the planet Niamos
- Combat assault tank pilots and commanders, also known as tank troopers, operate the Empire's arsenal of armored repulsorlift vehicles, from troop transports to heavily armored hovertanks. Combat drivers are lightly armored, relying instead on the thick skin of their vehicles to protect them in battle. The commander stays in contact with his crew and with headquarters to keep updated on changing combat conditions. This type of troopers were introduced in the 2016 Han Solo comic book series and made their on-screen debut in Rogue One.
- Patrol troopers are enforcement-based stormtroopers, commonly found in large cities with particular strategic importance where they take the place of local security forces. The urban counterpart to scout troopers, they ride speeder bikes much like them. Patrol troopers are first seen in Solo: A Star Wars Story (2018), where one such trooper briefly pursues Han Solo and Qi'ra on Corellia.
- Swamp troopers, also known informally as mudtroopers, are Imperial Army troopers assigned to fight on swampy, war-torn worlds. Army troopers are regular infantry who fight alongside stormtroopers; many were members of planetary forces before being conscripted into Imperial service. Mudtroopers wear water-resistant clothing, partial armor with respirator masks, and polarized goggles. Swamp troopers are first seen on the planet Mimban in Solo, with Han Solo having been one such trooper during his service for the Empire. Their armor is that of a standard stormtrooper but heavily customized to allow for optimal operation in the areas where they are dispatched. They can be distinguished by their grey, muddy armor, and waterproof capes.
- Range troopers are first seen on Vandor in Solo. Considered to be one of the toughest branches of the Imperial Army, this type of troopers are selected from the ranks of the most skilled Imperial soldiers and usually assigned to protect valuable cargo, but sometimes can also be deployed to combat zones. Range troopers are outfitted with snowtrooper-like armor, including heavy fur-lined armor for protection against cold environments, and magnetic boots. In Solo, a group of range troopers guard a cargo train transporting coaxium which is raided by Tobias Beckett, Han Solo and Chewbacca.
- Jumptroopers, also known as rocket troopers, are outfitted with jetpacks. They are trained to act in unison, often swarming and overwhelming their targets. There are multiple variants of jumptroopers, such as the Arctic Jumptrooper, deployed in cold environments, the Desert Jumptrooper, deployed in arid environments, and the Forest Jumptrooper, deployed in forested areas. Jumptroopers are featured in various Star Wars media, both Legends and canon, with varying designs.
- Dark troopers originated in the video game Star Wars: Dark Forces (1995). They have since made various appearances in other Star Wars Legends material, often with varying designs. The original Dark Troopers are cyborg clone troopers, with later iterations being dark-armored battle droids or occasionally exo-suits, and are used in small numbers by the Empire. Dark Troopers were reintroduced in the current Star Wars canon through the mobile game Star Wars: Commander (2015), and made their live-action debut in the second season of The Mandalorian (2020).
- Shadow troopers, also known as black hole troopers, are elite special-ops troopers featured mostly in Star Wars Legends material. Assigned to the Empire's mysterious Shadow Guard, one of their most prominent appearances is in the video game Star Wars: The Force Unleashed, where they have shiny, reflective black armor that allows them to become invisible. Shadow Troopers returned in Star Wars Battlefront, which reintroduced them in the Star Wars canon.
- Purge troopers are a specialized class of stormtroopers trained and equipped to assist Darth Vader and his Imperial Inquisitors in hunting down surviving Jedi and other Force-sensitive beings who threaten the Empire. The first purge troopers are the last generation of clone troopers activated after the formation of the Empire, with new purge troopers being non-clone humans supplanting and eventually replacing their predecessors. They appear in the comic series Darth Vader: Dark Lord of the Sith (2018) and the video game Star Wars Jedi: Fallen Order (2019). Purge troopers appear also in the 4th and 5th episodes of Obi-Wan Kenobi (2022).
- Lava troopers are an elite class of stormtroopers stationed at Fortress Vader on Mustafar. They are outfitted with heat-resistant black armor. Lava Troopers are featured in the comic book series Tales from Vader's Castle.
- Forest troopers are trained to serve in forested environments. They are distinguished by their camouflaged armor. Forest Troopers have featured in the novel Aftermath: Life Debt.
- Seatroopers specialize in underwater operations. They are outfitted with breathing tubes attached to a scuba backpack and underwater propulsion jets. Seatroopers were originally introduced in Star Wars Legends in Marvel Comics' Star Wars comic book series, before being later reintroduced in the current Star Wars canon.
- Spacetroopers are stormtroopers trained to operate in Zero-G environments. They resemble the standard stormtroopers, but are outfitted with a rebreather pack to survive the harsh conditions of space. Two spacetroopers can be seen outside the Death Star in Star Wars (1977). They have since made appearances in a few other pieces of Star Wars media. In Star Wars Legends material, a different variation of space troopers with a bulkier appearance called Zero-G assault stormtroopers, are featured.
- Flametroopers specialize in the use of flamethrowers. They have appeared in various Star Wars media, with varying designs.
- Incinerator troopers are outfitted with flamethrowers and heat-resistant armor. They are distinguished by their red pauldrons and the red markings on their armor. They are likely an improved variant of the flametroopers. An Incinerator trooper is seen in the season one finale of The Mandalorian (2019).
- Artillery Stormtroopers, also known as mortar stormtroopers, are outfitted with mortars and heavy armor. They are distinguished by their yellow pauldrons and the yellow markings on their armor, similar to the markings of the Incinerator Troopers. A Mortar Stormtrooper is seen in "Chapter 14: The Tragedy" of The Mandalorian.
- Special Commando Advanced Recon Troopers, or SCAR troopers, are an elite class of stormtroopers in the Imperial Special Forces division. Most of these stormtroopers are unique in terms of armor design, equipment, and specialization, and are deployed in small groups by the Empire, to complete tasks that require their talents. One notable SCAR trooper squad is Task Force 99, featured in the 2016 Star Wars comic book series.
- Elite Squad troopers are specially selected soldiers from across the galaxy after the Clone Wars to allow the Empire to not be entirely reliant on clones. They are first seen in Star Wars: The Bad Batch (2021), which features a particular Elite Squad of recruited soldiers led by former Bad Batch member Crosshair.
- TK stormtroopers are an early generation of stormtroopers first seen in Star Wars: The Bad Batch (2021), introduced in the first days of the Empire as part of Project War-Mantle to replace aging clone troopers with naturally-born human conscripts and willing recruits. As part of the project, TK stormtroopers were secretly trained by clone commandos prior to their formal introduction in 18 BBY. Like their clone predecessors and their finalized successors, they wore black body gloves with white armor plating, while their helmets were repurposed from the cancelled Phase III clone trooper armor, and were armed with DC-15A blaster carbines inherited from the Republic military. TK stormtroopers that served as V-wing pilots for the Imperial Navy also saw service, with life-support gear built into their armor; like regular TK stormtroopers, they were eventually phased out for TIE fighter pilots.
- Storm commandos, also known as shadow scouts, are elite stormtroopers, trained to perform tasks that regular troopers are incapable of accomplishing. They operate in small groups and are outfitted with silver scout trooper armor to make them less visible to the enemy. Storm commandos are featured in various Star Wars Legends material where they had access to exclusive equipment and spacecraft not part of the Imperial Navy, such as Imperial escort carriers and TIE Hunters, the latter of which was designed specifically to counter the Rebel Alliance's X-wing. They were reintroduced in the current Star Wars canon through the mobile game Star Wars: Galactic Defense.
- Heavy troopers are an elite class of stormtroopers that specialize in melee combat. They carry electrostaffs and are outfitted with special combat armor. Heavy Troopers are featured in Star Wars: The Force Unleashed, and were reintroduced in the current Star Wars canon through Star Wars: Galactic Defense.
- Riot control stormtroopers specialize in melee combat. They are outfitted with batons and sometimes a shield. Most riot control stormtroopers are used as a security force tasked with the dispersion and arrest of insurgents taking part in disruptive activities. A different variation appears in the Legends game Star Wars: The Force Unleashed II, where they are outfitted with electro staffs and sport unique armor rather than standard stormtrooper armor.
- Rocket stormtroopers are stormtroopers outfitted with rocket launchers. They are usually tasked with destroying armored vehicles or buildings. Rocket stormtroopers have appeared in several Star Wars games.
- Demolition troopers are stormtroopers that specialize in the use of explosive weapons, such as smart rockets. They are featured in the video games Star Wars: Battlefront (2015) and Star Wars: Battlefront II (2017).
- Heavy weapons stormtroopers, also known as heavy assault stormtroopers, heavy troopers, or heavy gunners, are stormtroopers that specialize in the use of large rapid-fire blasters. Heavy troopers have appeared in various Star Wars media, with varying designs.
- Stormtrooper snipers are outfitted with sniper rifles. They can be distinguished by their visor and blue pauldron. A variant of the stormtrooper sniper, known as Imperial sharpshooters, appears in Star Wars: Commander; this type of sharpshooters are drawn from the ranks of elite scout troopers and outfitted with E-11s sniper rifles and a grey variant of the scout trooper armor.
- Magma troopers are stormtroopers used by the Empire to crush revolts on volcanic mining worlds, such as Sullust and Mustafar. They are outfitted with heat-resistant armor and a respirator connected to a backpack via a tube to protect them from volcanic ash and gasses. They can be distinguished by their black pauldrons (colored for the officers) and extra armor on their legs. Magma troopers first appeared in Star Wars: Battlefront (2015).
- Undead troopers are Imperial Stormtroopers who have been infected by the Imperial Bioweapons Project Blackwing. They are standard troopers who have since died and been reanimated by the virus with the goal of infecting others and causing as much death and infection as possible.
- Night troopers are stormtroopers who serve Grand Admiral Thrawn during his exile on the extragalactic planet Peridea. Their armour is unique, featuring red bandages wrapped around it, as well as a gold alloy filling in cracks. Thrawn's Nightsister allies imbue them with their magick, making them energized and faster, as well as allowing them to resurrect upon death.

==== First Order variants ====
- Flametroopers are first seen during the attack on the Tuanul village on Jakku in The Force Awakens (2015). Often deployed alongside standard First Order infantry, these specialized units flush out entrenched enemies with their flamethrowers. They wear backpack-style propellant tanks, special helmets with slit-like lenses that reduce glare, and temperature-control body gloves beneath their armor.
- Megablaster heavy assault troopers, more commonly known as heavy troopers, are introduced in The Force Awakens. They carry large FWMB-10 repeating blasters and web gear loaded with extra ammunition.
- Riot control troopers are first seen during the battle of Takodana in The Force Awakens. While they resemble the standard First Order stormtroopers, these specialized units excel in riot control and are outfitted with non-lethal betaplast shields and Z6 batons. One such trooper, FN-2199, calls Finn a traitor and fights him with a baton in the aforementioned battle before being killed by Han Solo.
- Snowtroopers are first seen on Starkiller Base in The Force Awakens. They wear specialized armor and gear that let them operate effectively in icy conditions. Snowtroopers carry a backpack-style personal environment unit and wear insulated helmets with glare-reducing slit lenses, gloves, a kama, and a heat-resistant body glove beneath an oversuit of wind-resistant fabric. Snowtrooper teams scouted the planet that once housed Starkiller Base, eliminating native life forms that posed a potential threat.
- Executioner troopers, introduced in The Last Jedi (2017), are a branch of military police specialists specifically founded to execute stormtroopers who are found guilty of treason. They are outfitted with BL-155 Laser axes used for execution and are distinguished by the black markings on their armor. In The Last Jedi, a pair of executioner troopers attempt to execute Finn and Rose Tico, before they were killed by Vice-Admiral Holdo's attack.
- Jet troopers are first seen on Pasaana in The Rise of Skywalker (2019). They are equipped with agile rocket packs, specializing in aerial and space operations.
- Treadspeeder drivers are seen on Pasaana in The Rise of Skywalker. Reminiscent of the Imperial scout troopers, they are outfitted with lighter armor and specialize in riding speeder bikes; in this case, the 125-Z treadspeeder bike, from which they take their name.
- Electropod troopers are featured in The Rise of Skywalker. They are outfitted with electrical staffs called "electropods", but are otherwise identical to the standard First Order stormtroopers. They are primarily used to guard prisoners.
- Raiders, featured in Star Wars Resistance, are an elite variant of First Order stormtroopers that specialize in hunting, especially relic hunting. They are mainly used by Supreme Leader Kylo Ren in his search for Sith relics.
- SCUBA troopers, featured in Star Wars Resistance, specialize in underwater operations. They are outfitted with underwater blasters, flippers, and a breathing apparatus.
- Tech stormtroopers, featured in Star Wars Resistance, specialize in extracting, decrypting, and analyzing data from droid memory cores or other sources.
- Walker drivers are stormtroopers trained to operate the First Order's walker vehicles, including the All-Terrain Armoured Transport, All-Terrain MegaCaliber Six, and All-Terrain Heavy Hauler. They wear armour akin to that of the regular First Order stormtrooper or snowtrooper, with a grey jumpsuit and grey marking on their helmets.

==== Sith Eternal variants ====
- Sith troopers are introduced in The Rise of Skywalker. Loyal only to the Sith Eternal, the resurrected Emperor Palpatine's secret Sith cult, these elite stormtroopers make up most of the Sith Eternal's military. As the next evolution of stormtroopers, Sith Troopers were raised by the Sith Eternal on Exegol to be the perfect soldiers, and outfitted with highly impact-resistant armor and better equipment than the First Order stormtroopers. They are distinguished by their bright red armor, which feature a slightly more textured pattern, although the overall design is reminiscent of past clone troopers. Sith Troopers draw their power and inspiration from the ancient Sith Order, with their armor's color meant to be reminiscent of the Sith's red lightsaber and strike fear into the hearts of their enemies.
- Sith trooper officers are trained to command squads of Sith Troopers. Their armor is outfitted with advanced sensor technology.
- Sith jet troopers are outfitted with jet packs. They closely resemble the First Order jet troopers, but are outfitted with red armor like the standard Sith Troopers.
- Sovereign protectors serve as the resurrected Emperor Palpatine's elite bodyguards on Exegol. Outfitted with red armor and full-body capes, they are reminiscent of the old Emperor's Royal Guard, but carry two-pronged blaster rifles instead of force pikes. Within Star Wars Legends material, Sovereign Protectors are the most elite variant of Imperial Guards.

== Cultural impact ==
Stormtroopers have become cultural icons, and a widely recognized element of the Star Wars franchise.. The term "stormtrooper" has become slang for someone who is bad at aiming. In 2015, an Imperial stormtrooper helmet from The Empire Strikes Back that was expected to sell at auction for $92,000 sold for $120,000. In 2019, a team of biologists named a new genus of Colombian spiders, Stormtropis, after the stormtroopers, noting the spiders, like the fictional soldiers, are "very similar to each other, with some capacity for camouflage but with unskillful movements". Stormtroopers also appear as cosmetic outfits in Fortnite.

== See also ==
- 501st Legion
- Clone trooper
- Emperor's Royal Guard
