= Star Wars: Battlefront =

Series of first- and third-person Star Wars video games

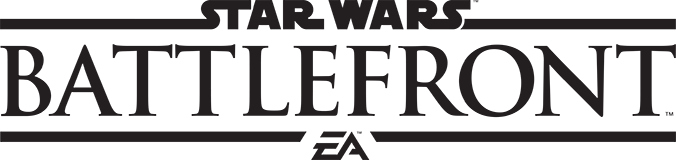
- Logo under Electronic Arts
- Genres: First-person shooter Third-person shooter
- Developers: Pandemic Studios (2004–05); Free Radical Design (2006–08); Rebellion Developments (2007–09); Slant Six Games (2009–10); LucasArts (2008–13); EA DICE (since 2013); Criterion Games (2016–2017); Motive Studios (since 2017)
- Publishers: LucasArts (2004–09); Electronic Arts (2015–17); Aspyr (2024)
- Platforms: Windows; PlayStation 2 PlayStation Portable; PlayStation 4 PlayStation 5 Nintendo DS; Nintendo Switch; Mobile phone Xbox; Xbox One; Xbox Series X/S
- First release: Star Wars: Battlefront; September 21, 2004
- Latest release: Star Wars: Battlefront Classic Collection; March 14, 2024
- Parent series: Star Wars video games

Star Wars: Battlefront is a series of first- and third-person shooter video games based on the Star Wars franchise. Players take the role of characters from the franchise in either of two opposing factions in different time periods of the Star Wars universe. The series was launched in 2004 by LucasArts with Star Wars: Battlefront, developed by Pandemic Studios for LucasArts. The game received positive reviews and sold well. In 2005 Pandemic developed a sequel, Star Wars: Battlefront II, which was also critically and commercially successful.

The games were followed by Star Wars Battlefront: Renegade Squadron (2007) and Star Wars Battlefront: Elite Squadron (2009) for handheld game consoles and Star Wars Battlefront: Mobile Squadrons (2009) for mobile devices. LucasArts made several attempts to develop a third major Battlefront game, but no projects were released before The Walt Disney Company's acquisition of LucasArts. Subsequently, Electronic Arts (EA) acquired an exclusive license to develop console Star Wars titles from Lucasfilm, leading to the development of a reboot under DICE. Titled Star Wars Battlefront, the game was released on November 17, 2015. A sequel, Star Wars Battlefront II, was released on November 17, 2017, and was co-developed by EA DICE, Criterion Games, and Motive Studio. A collection of the first two entries in the original series was ported to modern platforms by Aspyr, and was released as Star Wars: Battlefront Classic Collection on March 14, 2024.

== Gameplay ==
Release timeline LucasArts EA Aspyr
2004	Star Wars: Battlefront
2005	Star Wars: Battlefront II
2006
2007	Star Wars Battlefront: Renegade Squadron
2008
2009	Star Wars Battlefront: Mobile Squadrons
2009	Star Wars Battlefront: Elite Squadron
2010
2011
2012
2013
2014
2015	Star Wars Battlefront
2016
2017	Star Wars Battlefront II
2018
2019
2020
2021
2022
2023
2024	Star Wars: Battlefront Classic Collection

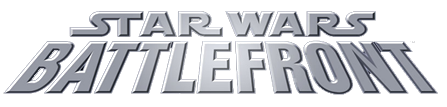
Battlefront series logo until 2013

Games in the Battlefront series normally revolve around two armies – the Galactic Republic versus the Confederacy of Independent Systems, the Galactic Empire versus the Rebel Alliance, or the First Order versus the Resistance – fighting each other on various maps. The maps are based on planets and locations in the Star Wars galaxy, with battlezones varying in theme and size. Across the battlefield are multiple "command posts" (objectives) that act as spawn points and can be controlled by either the player or the computer. Units can spawn from any friendly command post, and vehicles regularly spawn at their respective command posts when destroyed. Units can capture neutral or hostile command posts by approaching them and standing within the immediate vicinity for about 30 seconds. The time to capture quickens with more friendly units within the capture zone. Some vehicles act as mobile command posts, and must be destroyed as they cannot be captured. On some maps (such as Hoth or Endor), certain structures also act as command posts that cannot be captured. Command post capturing works differently on certain campaign missions as well. Playable heroes and villains play a significant role in changing the course of battles.

The objective of most matches is to eliminate all of the opponents' reinforcement tickets or to capture the command points, to slowly chip away at their tickets. Reinforcement tickets are used whenever a unit is killed, or when one faction controls a majority of the command posts on the map (usually when the losing faction only has 2–3). Only one objective needs to be completed. When all command posts are captured, the team with no command posts has twenty seconds to recapture or neutralize an enemy command post. If the team cannot take over a post in this time, the match is over. Certain campaign levels and multiplayer modes have requirements that differ from the general gameplay structure, but the overall structure remains the same. The game's "Conquest" mode is based on the Battlefield game mode of the same name.

== Development ==
The first console games of the series were developed by Pandemic Studios, and since 2015, a second series of console Battlefront games has been developed by EA DICE. Battlefront II (2017) is the first in the series to accurately follow the canon of the films, while the games developed by Pandemic Studios were relegated to Star Wars Legends non-canonical status, along with all of the games in the series released before November 2015.

== Star Wars: Battlefront (Pandemic Studios) ==
=== Star Wars: Battlefront ===
Star Wars: Battlefront is the first installment in the Battlefront series. It was released on September 21, 2004, with a Mac port by Aspyr released in July 2005. The game is available on Microsoft Windows, PlayStation 2, Xbox, Mac OS, and mobile phones. Jedi are not playable in this game without the help of modified files unsupported by LucasArts. Other NPCs made playable by similar files include, but are not limited to, Tusken Raiders in the Dune Sea of Tatooine, Ewoks on Endor, and Gungans on the Naboo plains.

=== Star Wars: Battlefront II ===
Star Wars: Battlefront II is the second installment in the Battlefront series, released in Europe on October 31, 2005 – for the PlayStation 2, PlayStation Portable, Xbox, and Windows – and in North America one day later. There are some significant differences between Battlefront and Battlefront II. The sequel includes playable Jedi characters, space battles, and a story campaign, as well as content based on Star Wars: Episode III – Revenge of the Sith. The release date of Battlefront II coincided with the release of Revenge of the Sith on DVD. The game is now an Xbox Platinum Hits game, a Sony Greatest Hits game in North America, and an Xbox Classics and PlayStation Platinum game in Europe.

Battlefront II expands upon the original game's single-player experience with mission-based objectives drawn from the first six Star Wars films. It has a story-based campaign which revolves around the 501st Legion and its evolution from a legion of clone troopers serving the Galactic Republic during the Clone Wars to Imperial Stormtroopers. Many maps from Star Wars Battlefront make a second appearance, and the game adds new locales such as Coruscant and Utapau. The game also introduces "heroes" – playable characters based on iconic characters from the Star Wars films who are much more powerful than regular soldiers. Furthermore, Battlefront II features new game modes such as Capture the Flag (both with one and two flags), Hunt (a wipeout mode, where one team assumes the role of an indigenous species from a chosen planet and must eliminate an invading army before they are eliminated themselves), Space Assault (a space battle mode, where players piloting starfighters have to accumulate more points than the opposing team by damaging the enemy capital ship), Hero Assault (a wipeout mode similar to Hunt, where players instead get to control hero characters), and Galactic Conquest (a large-scale mode where players command a fleet and attempt to conquer the galaxy by controlling as many planets as possible).

=== Star Wars: Battlefront Classic Collection ===
In February 2024, a collection of Star Wars: Battlefront and Star Wars: Battlefront II was announced for the Nintendo Switch, Xbox One, Xbox Series X/S, PlayStation 4, PlayStation 5, and Windows. It features online multiplayer, a Galactic Conquest mode, an expanded Hero Assault mode, as well as additional characters and maps. It was released on March 14, 2024, becoming the second game in the series to be available on a Nintendo platform after Elite Squadron on the Nintendo DS nearly fifteen years prior.

=== Canceled sequels ===
==== Star Wars: Battlefront III ====
On September 29, 2006, Computer and Video Games made an unconfirmed claim that Free Radical Design was developing a third game in the Star Wars: Battlefront series, titled Star Wars: Battlefront III. In June 2008, Kotaku allegedly received information from a former LucasArts employee that Star Wars: Battlefront III was in the creation process. On October 2, Activision Blizzard filed a classification with the Australian Office of Film and Literature Classification listing Star Wars: Battlefront III for the Nintendo DS with a PG rating for mild animated violence, equivalent to the ESRB's Everyone 10+ rating. However, that same month, Free Radical Design announced that they lost the rights to develop Star Wars: Battlefront III; the game at that point had been in development for two years. Several years later, Free Radical Design co-founder Steve Ellis said Battlefront III was "pretty much done" in 2008, but that it was effectively canned when LucasArts could not commit to "spend big" on marketing it. However, GameSpot quoted an unnamed LucasArts employee involved with the project who said Free Radical could not devote sufficient resources to the game and regularly missed deadlines. A former Free Radical Design employee said some of the technology Free Radical developed for the game, specifically the contiguous game environment from planet surface into space, "is dying with us".

During and after the game's development, screenshots and gameplay footage became accessible to the public. In December 2008, Star Wars character renders bearing a Battlefront III watermark surfaced from a laid-off Free Radical employee. The following month, gameplay footage was leaked from a November 2008 Free Radical in-house showing of Battlefront III footage. The footage was pulled from IGN after LucasArts demanded its removal. On April 1, 2012, a user on the game journalist website Betagames discovered Star Wars models and textures buried in Resident Evil: Operation Raccoon City's archives; PC Gamer's Tom Senior speculated that these could have been from Battlefront III. Also in April 2012, Past to Present revealed pre-alpha footage of Free Radical Design's Battlefront III. YouTube videos showing the game's rough state received media attention from outlets such as Joystiq, Kotaku, and Shacknews.

In December 2024, sixteen years after the game's cancelation, a Wii build of Battlefront III was publicly released by the Free Radical Archive. The build in question was dated just a week before the game's ultimate cancelation. Among the many notable features included in the build was a Jedi Fighter flying from Coruscant to a space battle, which would have improved the immersion of space battles from the previous entries in the series.

==== Star Wars: Battlefront Online ====
Star Wars: Battlefront Online was rumored to be the next installment in the series. On January 28, 2010, Kotaku reported that SOCOM developer Slant Six Games was working with LucasArts to develop an online-only Battlefront title due in 2011. The game was said to release for the Xbox 360 and PlayStation 3. It was also stated that this game may have been the source of the Star Wars: Battlefront III concept art renders. However, the game was canceled after the studio was unable to meet its 2010 release deadline.

==== Star Wars: First Assault and Version Two ====
Star Wars: First Assault was to be a downloadable multiplayer shooter for Xbox Live Arcade. Digital Trends speculated that First Assault might help LucasArts recover some of their previous investment in Battlefront III and other projects in the franchise. Speaking to Kotaku, an anonymous insider noted that the game was to be "step zero" towards a third Battlefront game. When footage of the game was leaked onto YouTube, tech site TechnoBuffalo noted that the gameplay very closely resembled that of the Call of Duty franchise. Alongside First Assault, LucasArts was also working on a separate game titled "Version 2", which was, reportedly, a codename for Battlefront III.

==== Star Wars Battlefront IV ====
In 2018, concept art surfaced of a canceled Battlefront IV. Rather than attempting to fit within the previous games and films' continuity, the concept art showed the game was meant to focus on an alternate reality where Obi-Wan Kenobi and Luke Skywalker fell to the dark side instead of Anakin Skywalker. Also featured was concept art of a non-cyborg General Grievous, Darth Vader as emperor, and Jedi versions of Count Dooku, Asajj Ventress, and Maul.

== Handheld and mobile games ==
=== Star Wars Battlefront: Renegade Squadron ===
Star Wars Battlefront: Renegade Squadron is a handheld game released in North America on October 9, 2007, and in Europe three days later. It was released exclusively for the PlayStation Portable, and for a time was available in a bundle pack with the then-new white PSP redesign featuring Darth Vader on the back.

Aside from new heroes and vehicles, such as the Millennium Falcon, a new feature in the game is the ability to create a character and customise their attributes, such as their physical appearance and weapon of choice. Certain attributes can be upgraded at the expense of others, such as improved speed at the expense of health, or a better weapon at the expense of stamina and speed. Before the game's release, LucasArts stated that over one million different customisable options would be present. Another new feature allows players to enter asteroid bases on some space maps. Similar to Battlefront II, Renegade Squadron includes a single-player campaign, which follows the story of the titular Rebel squadron during the Galactic Civil War, up to and including the events of Return of the Jedi.

=== Star Wars Battlefront: Mobile Squadrons ===
Star Wars Battlefront: Mobile Squadrons is a mobile game developed by THQ Wireless. It was released on April 2, 2009. The game features a persistent online community, and has three character classes. The gameplay consists of first-person rail shooter segments that leverage the phone's touch features.

=== Star Wars Battlefront: Elite Squadron ===
Star Wars Battlefront: Elite Squadron was released on November 3, 2009, for the PlayStation Portable and the Nintendo DS. It is the third Battlefront game released for the PlayStation Portable, and the first to be released for a Nintendo console. The game was originally discovered through its ESRB rating on the official ESRB website, which has since been taken down. It follows in the same vein as its predecessors with space, land, and new air battles. Elite Squadron is most notable for featuring simultaneous space and ground battles in the Instant Action mode, and is the only game in the series with this feature. While the game is normally played from a third-person perspective, the PSP version includes a strategy-based mode where players can build troops and upgrade armies.

== Star Wars Battlefront (EA DICE) ==
=== Star Wars Battlefront (2015) ===
At an Electronic Entertainment Expo (E3) press conference on June 10, 2013, EA DICE (whose parent company, Electronic Arts, had recently acquired a multi-year license to produce Star Wars video games) unveiled a teaser trailer for a new Star Wars: Battlefront game, built on the Frostbite 3 engine. The teaser showed a first-person view of the Battle of Hoth, including a crashing Snowspeeder and the foot of an AT-AT. DICE showed additional development footage at the 2014 E3 conference. The game's title was eventually announced as Star Wars Battlefront. In April 2015, at Star Wars Celebration, EA confirmed the game's release date of November 17, 2015. A gameplay trailer involving the Hoth battle debuted at E3 on June 15, 2015.

Star Wars Battlefront is a reboot of the series, focusing on capturing the look of the Star Wars films. It incorporates both first and third-person gameplay perspectives, and focuses on the multiplayer aspect of the series, featuring several different game modes. A pseudo-campaign is included in the form of a cooperative experience that can be played alone or with one other player, alongside computer-controlled allies and opponents. At launch, four planets were confirmed – Hoth, Tatooine, Endor, and Sullust. Unlike its predecessors, the game does not include the Clone Wars era found in the prequel films, nor does it feature content from Star Wars: The Force Awakens. As a result, the hero roster is also limited; at launch, it consisted of Luke Skywalker, Han Solo, Leia Organa, Darth Vader, Emperor Palpatine, and Boba Fett.

The game was supported with several releases of downloadable content (DLC), most of which are included in its season pass. The first DLC, featuring two maps set on the planet Jakku and a new multiplayer mode, was released for free in December 2015. The second expansion, and the first to be included in the season pass, is Outer Rim, adding two maps – Jabba the Hutt's palace on Tatooine, and an Imperial factory on Sullust – and two playable heroes – Nien Nunb for the Rebellion, and Greedo for the Empire. It was released on March 22, 2016. The next expansion, Bespin, was released on June 21, 2016, and added a map set in Cloud City on the planet Bespin, as well as Lando Calrissian and Dengar as playable heroes. It was followed by the Death Star expansion on September 20, 2016, which saw the addition of a Death Star map and Chewbacca and Bossk as playable heroes. The final DLC for the game, Rogue One: Scarif, added content based on the film Rogue One: A Star Wars Story, including a Scarif map and two new heroes: Jyn Erso and Orson Krennic. It was released on December 20, 2016.

=== Star Wars Battlefront II (2017) ===
Blake Jorgensen of Electronic Arts first mentioned a sequel to 2015's Star Wars Battlefront in November 2016. The game, titled Star Wars Battlefront II, was officially announced in March 2017, and was released on November 17, 2017, for the PlayStation 4, Xbox One, and Windows. Since the restructuring of the Star Wars canon, Battlefront II is the first game with a storyline that is considered canonical to the film series. It covers the period between Return of the Jedi and The Force Awakens and follows Inferno Squad, an Imperial special ops unit.

Star Wars Battlefront II expands upon the gameplay elements of its predecessor, featuring both single-player and multiplayer game modes, a customizable character class system, and content based on all Star Wars films up to The Force Awakens. Over 20 planets and locations from across the entire franchise are included, and a wide array of soldier classes and hero characters are playable. The game also places a bigger emphasis on space battles than 2015's Battlefront, allowing players to pilot starfighters on specific maps and incorporating some space-only game modes. Through free updates released periodically from December 2017 to April 2020, additional content based on other Star Wars media such as The Last Jedi, Solo: A Star Wars Story, The Clone Wars, and The Rise of Skywalker was added, including new maps, heroes, and game modes. The final update, which added the planet Scarif from Rogue One, was released on April 29, 2020.

=== Canceled spin-off ===
In 2019, Electronic Arts was in the process of developing a game code-named Viking, developed by EA Vancouver and designed as a spin-off of the Battlefront series with open world elements. The game was originally planned for release in fall 2020, coinciding with the next generation of video game consoles, but was canceled in late 2019.

== Other releases ==
=== Star Wars Battlefront II: Inferno Squad ===
Star Wars Battlefront II: Inferno Squad is a novel written by Christie Golden. It was published on July 25, 2017, by Del Rey Books. The story begins immediately after the events of Star Wars: Episode IV – A New Hope and follows Iden Versio, the protagonist of Star Wars Battlefront II's single-player campaign. It details the creation of Inferno Squad and the early missions undertaken by the unit during the Galactic Civil War. Inferno Squad is the second book in the Star Wars: Battlefront tie-in novel series, following Battlefront: Twilight Company.

=== Galaxy in Turmoil ===
On January 25, 2016, Frontwire Studios began an attempt to produce an unofficial Battlefront installment titled Galaxy in Turmoil. The fan-made game was in production using Unreal Engine 4 and was based on the canceled Star Wars: Battlefront III by Free Radical Design. Although early versions of the game contained assets from Free Radical Design, they soon became "place holders" as the full game was planned to be released using assets and music made from the ground up. On June 4, 2016, Galaxy in Turmoil gained a distribution deal through Valve and was planned to be released for free on Steam, which generated a fair amount of attention.

On June 22, 2016, Lucasfilm requested that the production of Galaxy in Turmoil be halted. On July 31, Frontwire Studios announced the cancellation of the game was due to the "possibility of Galaxy in Turmoil taking away attention from Electronic Arts's Battlefront franchise". Proposals of Galaxy in Turmoil falling under the paywall of Electronic Arts and ideas of Lucasfilm giving Frontwire Studios a Star Wars license were both rejected due to an agreement between Electronic Arts and Lucasfilm. Although Frontwire Studios may have fallen within fair use laws, legal conflict was avoided and the project was canceled. There is a playable alpha containing assets from Free Radical Design that was released to the public, then removed early within Galaxy in Turmoil's lifetime. The game would eventually be reworked into a standalone cyberpunk-themed IP without any connection to Star Wars, although it was still planned to implement Battlefront III-inspired mechanics such as space-to-ground battles.

In December 2019, Frontwire Studios released a free demo and launched a Kickstarter campaign in order to secure $500k for the development of the full game. On March 22, 2022, Frontwire Studios announced that it had cancelled development of Galaxy in Turmoil, citing a lack of funds, as well as the team going their separate ways.

== See also ==
- List of Star Wars video games
