= GameRanger =

Computer software

- Developer: Scott Kevill
- Stable release: 4.9 / Mac (May 29, 2008; 18 years ago), Windows (November 13, 2008; 17 years ago)
- Operating system: Mac OS, Mac OS X, Windows XP, Windows Vista, Windows 7, Windows 8, Windows 10, Windows 11
- Type: Server-matching / IRC application
- Website: www.gameranger.com

GameRanger is software for the Macintosh and Windows created by Australian developer Scott Kevill, which provides matchmaking for online games, as well as social features such as text chat rooms and voice chat. It was first released for the Macintosh in July 1999 and was given the "Best Internet Gaming Achievement" by Macworld Magazine. Windows support was added in 2008 and it currently supports over 700 titles.

== Overview ==
The software and service is maintained and managed by Scott Kevill. In addition to acting as a metaserver and browser for servers, lobbies, ranking, statistics, and invitations, the service also acts as a chat platform.

Gameranger evolved from Kevill's prior experience writing QuakeFinder and UnrealFinder, Mac exclusive server browsers for Quake and Unreal respectively, as well as other tools such as his Quiver level editor for Quake.

After GameSpy Arcade went offline, GameRanger announced that it would support games supported by GameSpy, eased by GameRanger's preexisting ability to interface with GameSpy's servers during their years of operation.

== List of supported games ==
1	101st: Airborne in Normandy
A	Act of War: Direct Action; Act of War: Direct Action Demo; Act of War: High Treason; Act of War: High Treason Demo; Against Rome; Age of Empires; Age of Empires Demo; Age of Empires II: Age of Chivalry; Age of Empires II: Forgotten Empires; Age of Empires II: The Age of Kings; Age of Empires II: The Age of Kings Demo; Age of Empires II: The Conquerors; Age of Empires II: The Conquerors Demo; Age of Empires III; Age of Empires III: The Asian Dynasties; Age of Empires III: The WarChiefs; Age of Empires: The Rise of Rome; Age of Empires: The Rise of Rome Demo; Age of Mythology; Age of Mythology: The Titans Expansion; Age of Sail II; Age of Wonders; Age of Wonders - Shadow Magic; Age of Wonders II: The Wizard's Throne; Alexander; Alexander Demo; Aliens vs Predator; Aliens vs Predator 2; American Conquest; American Conquest 2nd Demo; American Conquest Demo; American Conquest: Divided Nation; American Conquest: Fight Back; Ancient Conquest: The Golden Fleece; Ancient Conquest: The Golden Fleece Demo; Ancient Wars: Sparta; Anno 1404: Venice; Anno 1701; Ants; Arcanum: Of Steamworks & Magick Obscura; Armies of Exigo; Armies of Exigo Demo; Army Men; Army Men II; Army Men RTS; Army Men: Air Tactics; Army Men: Toys in Space; Army Men: World War; Arsenal of Democracy; Austerlitz: Napoleon's Greatest Victory; Axis & Allies; Axis & Allies RTS; Axis & Allies RTS Demo; Axis & Allies: Iron Blitz
B	Baldur's Gate; Baldur's Gate II: Shadows of Amn; Baldur's Gate II: Throne of Bhaal; Bandits: Phoenix Rising; Bandits: Phoenix Rising Demo; Bang! Gunship Elite; Bang! Gunship Elite Demo; Battle Isle: The Andosia War; Battle Isle: The Andosia War Demo; Battle Mages; Battle Mages Demo; Battle Mages: Sign of Darkness; Battle Realms; Battle Realms: Winter of the Wolf; Battlefield 1942; Battlefield 1942 Demo; Battlefield 1942: Desert Combat; Battlefield 1942: Secret Weapons of WWII; Battlefield 1942: Secret Weapons of WWII Demo; Battlefield 1942: The Road to Rome; Battlefield 2; Battlefield 2 Demo; Battlefield 2142; Battlefield 2: Special Forces; Battlefield Vietnam; Battlestations: Midway; Battlestations: Midway Demo; Battlezone II: Combat Commander; Besieger; Blitzkrieg; Blitzkrieg: Rolling Thunder; Borderlands; Borderlands 2
C	Call of Duty; Call of Duty 2; Call of Duty 4: Modern Warfare; Call of Duty: United Offensive; Call of Juarez; Call of Juarez Demo; Call of Juarez: Bound in Blood; Capitalism II; Captain Claw; Carmageddon TDR2000; CART Precision Racing; CART Precision Racing Demo; Celtic Kings: Rage of War; Celtic Kings: Rage of War Demo; Chris Sawyer's Locomotion; Civilization II Gold; Civilization III: Conquests; Civilization III: Play the World; Civilization IV; Civilization IV: Beyond the Sword; Civilization IV: Colonization; Civilization IV: Fall from Heaven II; Civilization IV: Warlords; Close Combat; Close Combat Demo; Close Combat II; Close Combat II Demo; Close Combat III; Close Combat III Demo; Close Combat IV; Close Combat IV Demo; Close Combat: Cross of Iron; Close Combat: Invasion Normandy; Close Combat: Invasion Normandy Demo; Close Combat: Last Stand Arnhem; Close Combat: Modern Tactics; Close Combat: The Longest Day; Close Combat: Wacht am Rhein; Clue: Murder at Boddy Mansion; Codename Panzers: Phase One; Codename Panzers: Phase One Demo; Codename Panzers: Phase Two; Codename Panzers: Phase Two Demo; Colin McRae Rally 04; Colin McRae Rally 04 Demo; Colin McRae Rally 2005; Colin McRae Rally 2005 Demo; Combat Flight Simulator; Combat Flight Simulator 3; Command & Conquer 3: Kane's Wrath; Command & Conquer 3: Tiberium Wars; Command & Conquer Generals; Command & Conquer Generals: ShockWave; Command & Conquer Generals: Zero Hour; Command & Conquer: Red Alert 2; Command & Conquer: Red Alert 3; Command & Conquer: Yuri's Revenge; Commandos 2: Men of Courage; Commandos 3: Destination Berlin; Company of Heroes; Company of Heroes: Opposing Fronts; Conquest: Frontier Wars; Conquest: Frontier Wars Demo; Cossacks II: Battle for Europe; Cossacks II: Napoleonic Wars; Cossacks: Back to War; Cossacks: European Wars; Cossacks: European Wars 2nd Demo; Cossacks: European Wars Demo; Cossacks: The Art of War; Cossacks: The Art of War Demo; Crimson Skies; Crimson Skies Demo; Crusader Kings; Crusader Kings: Deus Vult; Crusaders: Thy Kingdom Come
D	Darkest Hour; DarkPlanet: Battle for Natrolis; DarkPlanet: Battle for Natrolis Demo; Darkstone; Dawn of War; Dawn of War: Dark Crusade; Dawn of War: Soulstorm; Dawn of War: Winter Assault; Deadly Dozen: Pacific Theater; Deadly Dozen: Pacific Theater Demo; Deer Hunter 2004; Deer Hunter 2004 Demo; Deer Hunter 2005; Deer Hunter 2005 Demo; Delta Force; Delta Force 2; Delta Force: Black Hawk Down; Delta Force: Black Hawk Down: Team Sabre; Delta Force: Land Warrior; Delta Force: Task Force Dagge; Demigod; Descent 3; Descent 3: Mercenary; Desert Rats vs Afrika Korps; Desert Rats vs Afrika Korps Demo; Diablo; Diablo II; Diablo II: Lord of Destruction; Die by the Sword; Die by the Sword: Limb from Limb; Disciples II; Disciples II: Rise of the Elves; Disciples: Sacred Land; Dominion: Storm Over Gift 3; Dominions II: The Ascension Wars; Doom 3; Dragon Throne: Battle of Red Cliffs; Dragonshard; Dukes of Hazzard: Racing for Home; Dune 2000; Dungeon Keeper 2; Dungeon Keeper 2 Demo; Dungeon Lords; Dungeon Siege; Dungeon Siege Demo; Dungeon Siege II; Dungeon Siege II: Broken World; Dungeon Siege: Legends of Aranna
E	Earth 2150: Escape from the Blue Planet; Earth 2150: Lost Souls; Earth 2150: The Moon Project; Earth 2150: The Moon Project Demo; Earth 2160; Elite Warriors: Vietnam; Elite Warriors: Vietnam Demo; Emperor: Battle for Dune; Emperor: Rise of the Middle Kingdom; Emperor: Rise of the Middle Kingdom Demo; Empire Earth; Empire Earth 2.0; Empire Earth II; Empire Earth II Demo; Empire Earth II: The Art of Supremacy; Empire Earth: The Art of Conquest; Empires: Dawn of the Modern World; Empires: Dawn of the Modern World Demo; Enemy Territory: Quake Wars; Enemy Territory: Quake Wars Demo; Etherlords; Etherlords Demo; Etherlords II; Etherlords II Demo; Europa Universalis: Rome; European Air War; Evolva; Evolva Demo
F	Faces of War; Fair Strike; Fair Strike Demo; Fallout Tactics; Fallout Tactics Demo; Fantasy Wars; Fate of the Dragon; Fate of the Dragon Demo; FIFA 07; FIFA 08; FIFA 09; FIFA 10; FIFA 11; Final Days; Final Days Demo; FlatOut; FlatOut 2; Flight Simulator 2004; Flight Simulator 98; Flying Heroes; For the Glory; Forsaken; Freedom Force; Freedom Force vs The 3rd Reich; Freedom Force vs The 3rd Reich Demo; FutureCop: L.A.P.D.
G	Gangsters 2: Vendetta; Get Medieval; Ghost Recon; Ghost Recon Advanced Warfighter; Ghost Recon Advanced Warfighter 2; Ghost Recon Advanced Warfighter 2 Demo; Ghost Recon Advanced Warfighter Demo; Ghost Recon Demo; Ghost Recon: Desert Siege; Ghost Recon: Island Thunder; Giants: Citizen Kabuto; Greed: Black Border; GRID; Ground Control; Ground Control II: Operation Exodus; Ground Control: Dark Conspiracy; Gruntz; Gruntz Demo
H	Haegemonia: Legions of Iron; Haegemonia: Legions of Iron Demo; Haegemonia: The Solon Heritage; Halo: Combat Evolved; Halo: Combat Evolved Demo; Halo: Custom Edition; Hard Truck Tycoon; Harley-Davidson 2: Wheels of Freedom; Harley-Davidson: Race Around the World; Hearts of Iron; Hearts of Iron II; Hearts of Iron II: Armageddon; Hearts of Iron II: Doomsday; Hearts of Iron III; Heretic II; Heretic II Demo; Heroes of Annihilated Empires; Heroes of Annihilated Empires Demo; Heroes of Might & Magic II; Heroes of Might & Magic III; Heroes of Might & Magic III: Armageddon's Blade; Heroes of Might & Magic IV; Heroes of Might & Magic IV: The Gathering Storm; Heroes of Might & Magic IV: Winds of War; Heroes of Might & Magic V; Heroes of Might & Magic V: Hammers of Fate; Heroes of Might & Magic V: Tribes of the East; Hidden & Dangerous Deluxe; Highland Warriors; Homeworld; Homeworld 2; Homeworld 2 Demo; Homeworld: Cataclysm; Homeworld: Raider Retreat; Hot Wheels: Stunt Track Challenge
I	Icewind Dale; Icewind Dale II; Icewind Dale: Heart of Winter; Imperial Glory; Imperialism; Imperialism II: The Age of Exploration; Imperivm III: Great Battles of Rome; Impossible Creatures; Impossible Creatures: Creature Chaos; Impossible Creatures: Insect Invasion; Insane; Insane Demo
J	Jack Nicklaus 6: Golden Bear Challenge; Jane's Attack Squadron; Jane's F-15; Jane's F/A-18; Jane's Fleet Command; Jane's IAF: Israeli Air Force; Jane's USAF: United States Air Force; Jane's WWII Fighters; Jedi Academy; Jedi Knight II: Jedi Outcast; Jedi Knight: Dark Forces II; Jedi Knight: Dark Forces II Demo; Jedi Knight: Mysteries of the Sith; Joint Operations: Escalation; Joint Operations: Typhoon Rising; Joint Task Force; Judge Dredd: Dredd vs Death
K	Kingpin: Life of Crime; Knights & Merchants: The Peasants Rebellion; Knights & Merchants: The Shattered Kingdom; Knights of Honor; Knights of Honor Demo; Kohan II: Kings of War; Kohan II: Kings of War Demo; Kohan: Ahriman's Gift; Kohan: Ahriman's Gift Demo; Kohan: Immortal Sovereigns; Kohan: Immortal Sovereigns Demo
L	Line of Sight: Vietnam; Line of Sight: Vietnam Demo; Links 2001; Links 2001 Demo; Links 2003; Links 2003 Demo; Links LS 2000; Links LS 2000 Demo; Lionheart: Legacy of the Crusader; Lords of Magic: Special Edition; Lords of the Realm II; Lords of the Realm II Demo; Lords of the Realm III
M	Machines: Wired for War; Machines: Wired for War Demo; Majesty; Majesty 2: The Fantasy Kingdom Sim; Majesty: The Northern Expansion; Master of Orion II: Battle at Antares; Master of Orion III; Master Rallye; MechCommander; MechCommander 2; MechCommander Gold; MechWarrior 3; MechWarrior 3 Demo; MechWarrior 3: Pirate's Moon; MechWarrior 4: Black Knight; MechWarrior 4: Mercenaries; MechWarrior 4: Mercenaries Demo; MechWarrior 4: Vengeance; Medal of Honor: Allied Assault; Medal of Honor: Allied Assault Demo; Medal of Honor: Breakthrough; Medal of Honor: Breakthrough Demo; Medal of Honor: Spearhead; Medal of Honor: Spearhead Demo; Medieval II: Total War; Medieval II: Total War: Americas; Medieval II: Total War: Britannia; Medieval II: Total War: Crusades; Medieval II: Total War: Teutonic; Medieval: Total War; Medieval: Total War: Viking Invasion; Men of War; Men of War: Assault Squad; Men of War: Condemned Heroes; Men of War: Vietnam; Merchant Prince II; Metal Fatigue; Midnight Outlaw Nitro Edition; Midnight Outlaw Nitro Edition Demo; Midtown Madness; Midtown Madness 2; Midtown Madness 2 Demo; Midtown Madness Demo; Mig Alley; Monopoly 3; Monopoly Star Wars; Monopoly Tycoon; Monster Truck Madness 2; Monster Truck Madness 2 Demo; Motocross Madness; Motocross Madness 2; Motocross Madness 2 Demo; Motocross Madness Demo; Motocross Mania; Motocross Mania Demo; MotoGP 2; MotoGP 2 Demo; MotoGP URT 3; MotoGP URT 3 Demo; MTX MotoTrax
N	Need for Speed III: Hot Pursuit; Need for Speed: High Stakes; Need for Speed: Hot Pursuit 2; Need for Speed: Most Wanted; Need for Speed: Porsche Unleashed; Need for Speed: Shift; Need for Speed: Underground 2; Nemesis of the Roman Empire; Nemesis of the Roman Empire Demo; Neverwinter Nights; Neverwinter Nights: Hordes of the Underdark; Neverwinter Nights: Kingmaker; Neverwinter Nights: Shadows of Undrentide; Nox; Nox Demo
O	Operation Blockade; Operation Blockade Demo; Operation Flashpoint; Operation Flashpoint Demo; Operation Flashpoint: Dragon Rising; Operation Flashpoint: Resistance; Order of War; Original War; Outlaws; Outlaws Demo; Outlive; Outlive Demo; Outwars
P	Painkiller; Painkiller Demo; Painkiller: Battle Out of Hell; Panzer General II; ParaWorld; ParaWorld Demo; Parkan: Iron Strategy; Patrician II: Quest for Power; Patrician III: Rise of the Hanse; People's General; Perimeter; Perimeter Demo; Perimeter: Emperor's Testament; Perimeter: Emperor's Testament Demo; PGA Championship Golf 2000; Pool of Radiance: Ruins of Myth Drannor; Populous: The Beginning; Populous: The Beginning Demo; Praetorians; Praetorians Demo; Prey; Prey Demo; Privateer's Bounty: Age of Sail II; Project Eden; Project Nomads
Q	Quake; Quake 4; Quake 4 Demo; Quake II; Quake II Demo; Quake III Arena; Quake III Arena Demo; Quake III: Team Arena; Quake III: Team Arena Demo; QuakeWorld
R	Race Driver; Race Driver Demo; Rage of Mages II: Necromancer; Railroad Tycoon 3; Rainbow Six; Rainbow Six 3: Athena Sword; Rainbow Six 3: Raven Shield; Rainbow Six: Eagle Watch; Rainbow Six: Lockdown; Rainbow Six: Take-Down; Rainbow Six: Vegas; Rainbow Six: Vegas 2; Rally Championship Xtreme; Re-Volt; Reach for the Stars; Real War; Real War: Rogue States; Real War: Rogue States Demo; Rise & Fall: Civilizations at War; Rise of Nations; Rise of Nations: Rise of Legends; Rise of Nations: Thrones and Patriots; Rising Kingdoms; Rising Kingdoms Demo; Risk; Risk II; Robot Arena 2; Rogue Spea; Rogue Spear Demo; Rogue Spear: Black Thorn; Rogue Spear: Black Thorn Demo; Rogue Spear: Covert Ops Essential; Rogue Spear: Urban Operations; Rome: Total War; Rome: Total War: Alexander; Rome: Total War: Barbarian Invasion; Rush for Berlin; Rush for Berlin Demo; Rush for Berlin: Rush for the Bomb
S	S.W.I.N.E.; S.W.I.N.E. Demo; Sacrifice; Sango 2; Sango 2 Demo; Serious Sam; Serious Sam 2; Serious Sam 2 Demo; Serious Sam Demo; Serious Sam: The Second Encounter; Serious Sam: The Second Encounter Demo; Seven Kingdoms; Seven Kingdoms 2 HD; Seven Kingdoms II: The Fryhtan Wars; Seven Kingdoms II: The Fryhtan Wars Demo; Seven Kingdoms: Ancient Adversaries; Seven Kingdoms: Conquest; Shadow Company: Left for Dead; Sid Meier's Alien Crossfire; Sid Meier's Alpha Centauri; Sid Meier's Antietam!; Sid Meier's Gettysburg!; Sid Meier's Railroads!; Silent Hunter II; SiN; SiN Demo; Sins of a Solar Empire; Sniper Elite; Soldiers of Anarchy; Soldiers of Anarchy Demo; Soldiers: Heroes of World War II; Spartan; Spartan Demo; SpellForce 2: Dragon Storm; SpellForce 2: Shadow Wars; SpellForce: Shadow of the Phoenix; SpellForce: The Breath of Winter; SpellForce: The Order of Dawn; SpellForce: The Order of Dawn Demo; Star Trek: Armada; Star Trek: Armada II; Star Trek: Armada II Demo; Star Trek: Birth of the Federation; Star Trek: Legacy; Star Trek: New Worlds; Star Wars Battlefront; Star Wars Battlefront II; Star Wars Clone Campaigns; Star Wars Empire at War; Star Wars Empire at War: Forces of Corruption; Star Wars Force Commander; Star Wars Galactic Battlegrounds; Star Wars Galactic Battlegrounds Demo; Star Wars Rebellion; Star Wars Republic Commando; Starcraft; Starcraft: Brood War; Starfleet Command II: Empires at War; Starfleet Command II: Empires at War Demo; Starfleet Command III; Starfleet Command: Orion Pirates; StarLancer; Starsiege; StarTopia; Stronghold; Stronghold 2; Stronghold Demo; Stronghold Legends; Stronghold: Crusader; Stronghold: Crusader Demo; Stronghold: Crusader Extreme; Sub Command: Seawolf; Submarine Titans; Submarine Titans Demo; Sudden Strike; Sudden Strike - Resource War; Sudden Strike 3: Arms for Victory; Sudden Strike Forever; Sudden Strike II; SunAge; SuperPower 2; Supreme Commander; Supreme Commander: Forged Alliance; Supreme Ruler 1936; Supreme Ruler 2010; Supreme Ruler 2010 Demo; Supreme Ruler 2020; Supreme Ruler 2020: Global Crisis; Supreme Ruler Ultimate; Supreme Ruler: Cold War; SWAT 4; SWAT 4: The Stetchkov Syndicate; Sword of the Stars; Sword of the Stars Demo; Sword of the Stars: A Murder of Crows; Sword of the Stars: Argos Naval Yard; Sword of the Stars: Born of Blood; Sword of the Stars: Collector's Edition Demo
T	Tales of the Sword Coast; Terraria; The Art of Magic; The Art of Magic Demo; The Battle for Middle-earth; The Battle for Middle-earth II; The Entente: World War I Battlefields; The Fate of Hellas; The Golden Horde; The Guild 2; The Guild 2: Pirates of the European Seas; The Political Machine 2004; The Rise of the Witch-king; The Settlers II: 10th Anniversary; The Settlers II: 10th Anniversary: Vikings; The Settlers III; The Settlers III Demo; The Settlers III: Mission CD; The Settlers III: Quest of the Amazons; The Settlers III: Quest of the Amazons Demo; The Settlers IV; The Settlers IV: Mission CD; The Settlers IV: The New World; The Settlers IV: The Trojans and the Elixir of Power; The Settlers: Heritage of Kings; The Settlers: Heritage of Kings Demo; The Settlers: Heritage of Kings: Expansion; The Settlers: Heritage of Kings: Legends; The Settlers: Rise of an Empire; The Settlers: Rise of an Empire: The Eastern Realm; The Sum of All Fears; The Sum of All Fears Demo; Tiger Woods PGA Tour 08; Titan Quest; Titan Quest: Immortal Throne; Top Spin; Torchlight II; Total Annihilation; Total Annihilation: Battle Tactics; Total Annihilation: Kingdoms; Total Annihilation: Kingdoms: The Iron Plague; Total Annihilation: The Core Contingency; True Crime: Streets of L.A.; Tzar: The Burden of the Crown; Tzar: The Burden of the Crown Demo
U	Uprising: Join or Die; Urban Assault; Urban Assault Demo
V	Victoria: An Empire Under the Sun; Victoria: Revolutions; Vietcong; Vietcong 2; Vietcong Dem; Vietcong: Fist Alpha; Vietcong: Fist Alpha Demo; Virtual Pool 3
W	Wages of SiN; War Front: Turning Point; War Front: Turning Point Demo; Warcraft III: Defense of the Ancients; Warcraft III: Reign of Chaos; Warcraft III: The Frozen Throne; Warhammer 40,000: Fire Warrior; Warhammer: Dark Omen; Warhammer: Mark of Chaos; Warhammer: Mark of Chaos Demo; Warhammer: Mark of Chaos: Battle March; Warlords Battlecry; Warlords Battlecry II; Warlords Battlecry II; Warlords Battlecry II Demo; Warlords III: Darklords Rising; Warlords III: Darklords Rising Demo; Warlords III: Reign of Heroes; Warlords IV: Heroes of Etheria; Warrior Kings; Warrior Kings: Battles; Warzone 2100; Warzone 2100 Demo; Waterloo: Napoleon's Last Battle; World in Conflict; World in Conflict: Soviet Assault; Worms 2; Worms 3D; Worms 4: Mayhem; Worms 4: Mayhem Demo; Worms World Party; Worms: Armageddon; Worms: Armageddon Demo; WWII Battle Tanks: T-34 vs Tiger
X	X-Wing Alliance; X-Wing vs TIE Fighter; X-Wing vs TIE Fighter: Balance of Power
Y	Yu-Gi-Oh! Power of Chaos: Joey the Passion

== See also ==
- GameSpy
- LogMeIn Hamachi
