= Day of Compassion =

Holiday

Since the 1940s, many social, educational, and spiritual initiatives have invoked a Day of Compassion. The term "Day of Compassion" first appeared in a call issued in 1942 by the Federal Council of the Churches of Christ in America to all Christians in the United States. It urged all Christians to pray and show compassion for the persecuted Jews in Europe. More than a half-century later, the idea of a Day of Compassion was used for several other purposes, including a television program HIV/AIDS-awareness, a university psychology course, a day of observance in India, and an international day of celebration.

== Day of Compassion television program ==
Between 1993 and 1999, the television event "Day of Compassion" took place every year on June 21 to honor people who were fighting AIDS or were HIV-positive. Neil Tadken, the television show's creator, was so moved by the HIV/AIDS-awareness storyline involving the character Billy Douglas (Ryan Phillippe) on One Life to Live, that Tadken contacted the producers of all ten daytime dramas, suggesting that on June 21, their shows mention AIDS and HIV in some way. Loving, All My Children, One Life To Live, General Hospital and Days of Our Lives participated in the first year. Hollywood Supports became the supporting organization, headed by Barry Diller and other major studio heads in the Hollywood. Tadken then met with producer Lawrence Leritz, who agreed to become the East Coast producer and spokesperson. Leritz continued for three seasons, and Day of Compassion became the largest one-day event in television history with over 200 shows participating, including soaps, talk shows, cable programs and news. Time magazine named Leritz as its Local Hero in June 1996 for his contribution.

== Day of Compassion student assignment ==
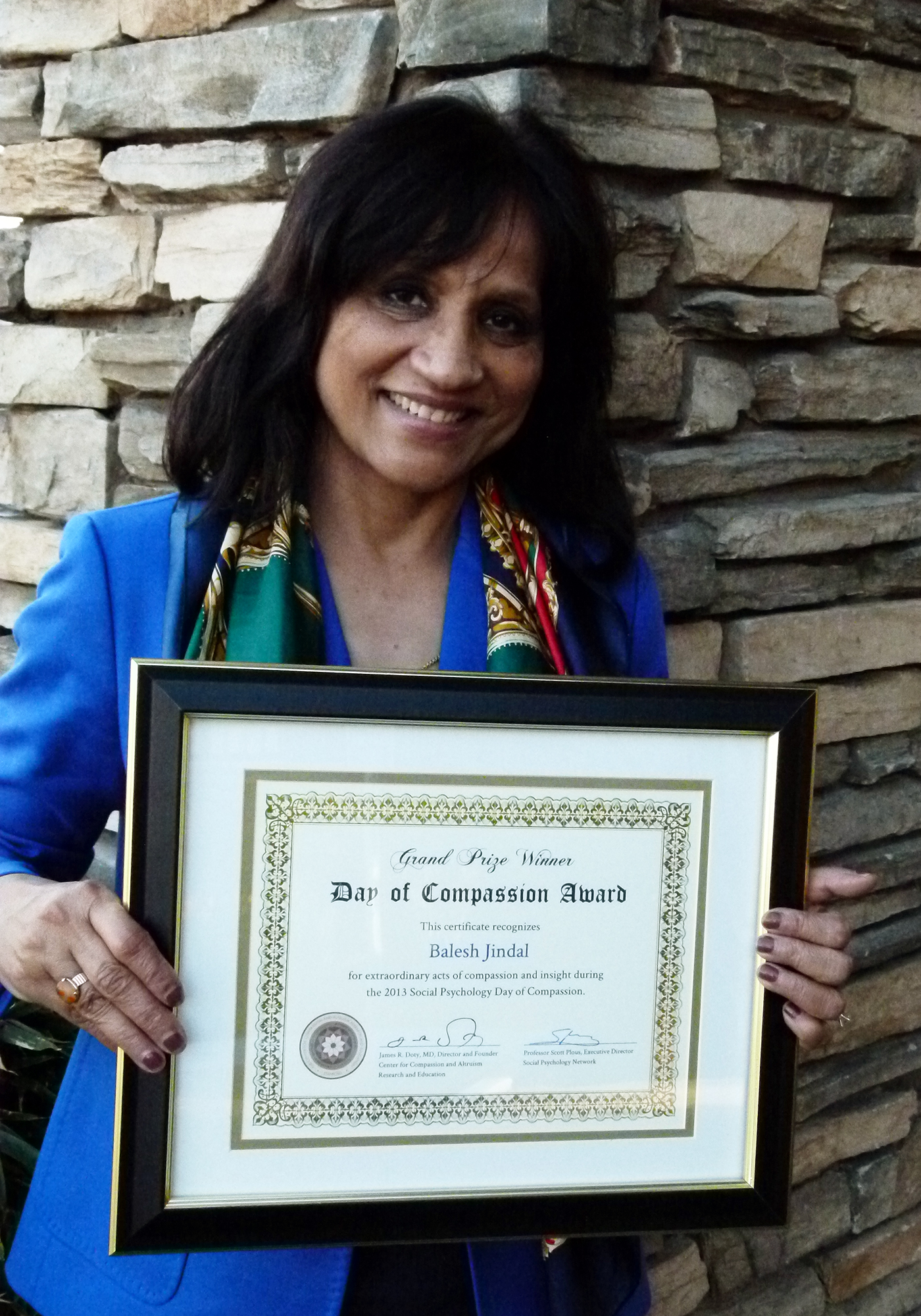
Balesh Jindal, winner of the 2013 Day of Compassion Award

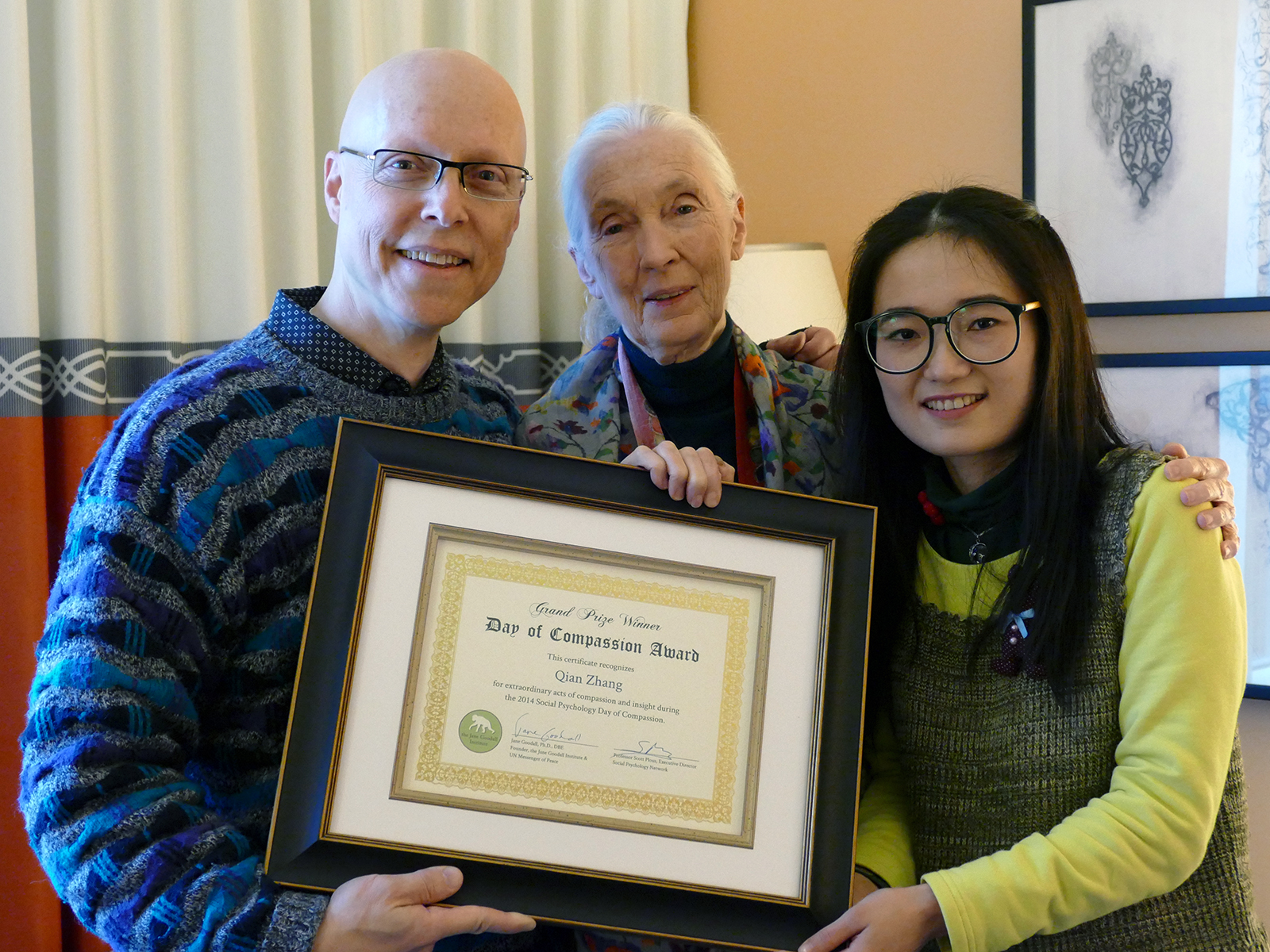
Qian Zhang (now Habi Zhang), winner of the 2014 Day of Compassion Award, with Professor Scott Plous and Dr. Jane Goodall

In 1997, Scott Plous, a psychology professor at Wesleyan University and executive director of the Social Psychology Network, developed an action teaching assignment in which students are challenged to behave as compassionately as possible for 24 hours and then analyze the experience. According to the instructions, students are asked to "live each minute of that day in as compassionate a way as possible. In other words, for a full 24-hour period you should do your best to reduce suffering, help other people in need, be considerate and respectful, and avoid causing harm to any living being." Afterward, students submit a paper answering questions such as:

- If your behavior was different than normal, which person did you like more: the "Day of Compassion you" or the "normal you"?
- If you preferred the "Day of Compassion you", what are the psychological factors that prevent this "you" from coming out?
- If you wanted to encourage others to behave as you did during the Day of Compassion, what techniques would you use?

The purpose of the assignment is to help students understand compassion—and barriers to compassion—in their daily life. As a result of the assignment, students have reportedly resolved conflicts with estranged family members, helped refugees and homeless strangers, rescued animals, volunteered at soup kitchens, donated to food drives, and carried out many other acts of kindness. Students also frequently report positive social reactions to their acts of compassion and a desire to continue carrying out such acts in the future.

Plous later created a version of the assignment for use in a social psychology massive open online course taken through Coursera by more than 1.2 million students from 200 countries. In the online course, students voted on the best Day of Compassion assignments submitted, and the grand prize winner was given an expense-paid trip to meet a public figure known for making the world a more compassionate place. In 2013 the winner was Balesh Jindal, a physician from India who addressed sexual violence towards girls in her community and later met the 14th Dalai Lama. In 2014 the winner was Qian Zhang, a Chinese mother who intervened when she heard a boy being beaten in a neighboring apartment and later met anthropologist Jane Goodall. And in 2022 the winner was Kristina Kanckova, a Slovakian woman who raised funds to buy a prosthetic hand for a disabled mother in Nepal and who later met women's rights activist Gloria Steinem. These meetings received press coverage and led the BBC to dub the assignment "the world's most compassionate 24 hours".

== World Compassion Day ==
In 2012 the first World Compassion Day, founded by Pritish Nandy, was held in Mumbai, India, in the presence of internationally known figures such as the 14th Dalai Lama. The Inaugural World Compassion Day focused on promoting animal welfare and vegetarianism, and was co-organized by Humane Society International. Each year, World Compassion Day takes place on November 28. According to Nandy: "The objective is to rediscover the relevance of ahimsa. We want to revive the idea of compassion not just as do-good gestures but also as an initiative to create an alternate lifestyle."

== Compassion Day ==
In 2012 the Foundation for the Preservation of the Mahayana Tradition began celebrating July 6 as an international "Compassion Day" in honor of the 14th Dalai Lama's birthday and as an opportunity for people to come together and dedicate themselves to making a positive difference in the world. A key goal of Compassion Day is to cultivate compassion not just in one's heart, as is done in meditation, but in meaningful ways that benefit others. By practicing "compassion in action", the day is also intended to inspire others to behave compassionately.
