= Action teaching =

Revision of article to reflect more breadth of sources

Action teaching is a style of instruction that aims to teach students about subject material while also contributing to the betterment of society. The approach represents an educational counterpart to action research, a method first developed by Kurt Lewin in the 1940s to address racial prejudice, anti-Semitism, and other societal problems through the integration of social science and social action. Proponents of action teaching argue that by allowing students to take action on social issues as part of the learning process, action teaching deepens learning, heightens student engagement, and provides students with a "scaffold" for future prosocial civic action.

Action teaching has been used in varied educational settings, including grade schools, high schools, colleges, universities, and online courses taken by undergraduate and postgraduate learners. Although action teaching was initially developed within the field of psychology, it later spread to other curricular areas such as business, law, and environmental science. The social issues that it addresses encompass diverse topics such as violence prevention, disaster relief, prejudice reduction, sustainable living, human health. animal protection, and the development of empathy and compassion.

== Origins of action teaching ==
The first use of the term "action teaching" appeared in the journal Teaching of Psychology in a 2000 article by Scott Plous. The article described a classroom role-playing exercise that taught students about the psychology of prejudice while also equipping them to respond to bigoted comments, and it noted the value of allowing students "to apply psychological research findings to an important social problem". The exercise was subsequently adopted by others, and the concept of action teaching broadened to other efforts aimed at integrating education and social action.

In 2006 an open-access repository of action teaching examples and resources was established, which can now be found on ActionTeaching.org. In 2011 the Encyclopedia of Peace Psychology included an entry on action teaching with examples focused on family life in refugee camps, urban youth violence prevention, anti-bullying curricula, and other topics relevant to peace education.

== Examples of action teaching ==
Action teaching has been incorporated in classroom activities, student assignments, workshops, field experiences, and web-based resources. For example:

- Business and law students at the University of Pennsylvania learned about fundraising techniques by raising more than $100,000 for the Make-A-Wish Foundation.
- High school students in Poland learned English by reading biographical stories of homeless people and completing language exercises that led to a reduction in stereotyping.
- College students in Massachusetts learned about human dynamics in the Holocaust and then taught children how such dynamics operate in contemporary hate speech, hate crimes, and bullying.
- Students in a massive open online course learned about compassion and empathy by treating others as compassionately as possible for 24 hours and analyzing what they learned during their "Day of Compassion".
- College students in New York learned about culture by providing financial education to refugee families in their communities, covering topics such as setting up a bank account, creating a budget, and avoiding credit card debt.
- Project Implicit website visitors learned about implicit social biases by taking the Implicit Association Test to assess their own level of bias and by reading about ways to reduce implicit bias in themselves and others.

== Action teaching awards and grants ==
From 2005 through 2015 Social Psychology Network held a yearly international action teaching award competition in which outstanding work was honored and posted on the web for other teachers to use or adapt. This award competition was succeeded in 2020 by the SPSSI Action Teaching Program established by the Society for the Psychological Study of Social Issues (Division 9 of the American Psychological Association).

The SPSSI program includes two main components: (1) the SPSSI Action Teaching Award, based on the award previously administered by Social Psychology Network; and (2) SPSSI Action Teaching Grants intended to support projects that "develop, enhance, or measure the impact of an innovative action teaching classroom activity, student assignment, field experience, or web-based resource". The inaugural winner of the SPSSI Action Teaching Award was an instructor at Florida International University who developed an assignment in which students learned about campus sexual violence and then created an anti-violence plan of their own based on empirically supported prevention principles. Action teaching grants have supported student learning projects related to gender inequity in the workplace. prejudice toward immigrants, community access to healthy food, and the social dimensions of climate change.

== Action teaching reports ==
In 2012 the Journal of Social and Political Psychology established a section of the journal devoted to "Action Teaching Reports" based on a belief that "education can play an important role in the betterment of society and the promotion of social justice". The section serves as a platform for sharing innovative and effective examples of action teaching. In one report, students learned about the negative health effects of stress and then delivered stress and coping workshops to homeless adolescent mothers in their community. In another, student groups met with individuals who had dementia and helped them create multimedia digital projects involving experiences with art or nature.

== See also ==
- Action learning
- Action research
- Active learning
- Service-learning
- Project-based learning
