= Star Wars Battlefront II (2017 video game) =

2017 video game

- Original box art, featuring (from left to right) Rey, Iden Versio, and Darth Maul
- Developer: DICE
- Publisher: Electronic Arts
- Director: Bernd Diemer
- Producers: Paul Keslin; Craig McLeod; James Salt
- Designers: Niklas Fegraeus; Linus Josephson
- Programmer: Jonas Kjellström
- Artist: Andrew Hamilton
- Writers: Walt Williams; Mitch Dyer
- Composer: Gordy Haab
- Series: Star Wars: Battlefront
- Engine: Frostbite 3
- Platforms: Microsoft Windows; PlayStation 4; Xbox One
- Release: November 17, 2017
- Genres: First-person shooter, third-person shooter
- Modes: Single-player, multiplayer

Star Wars Battlefront II is a 2017 action shooter video game developed by DICE and published by Electronic Arts. It is based on the Star Wars franchise, and is the fourth main installment of the Star Wars: Battlefront series and a sequel to the 2015 reboot of the series. The game features both single-player and multiplayer modes and includes more content than its predecessor. The single-player campaign is set between the films Return of the Jedi and The Force Awakens, and follows an original character, Iden Versio, the commander of an Imperial special ops strike force dubbed Inferno Squad. Most of the story takes place in the franchise's fictional galaxy during the final year of the Galactic Civil War, before the Empire's definitive defeat at the Battle of Jakku. Development of the title began by May 2016. The then-recently established studio Motive Studios was responsible for the single player campaign, and Criterion Games was responsible for the starfighter gameplay and mechanics. It was soon announced that the title would feature content from the sequel and prequel trilogies of films.

Prior to launch, the game came under widespread criticism when players discovered that the game's loot boxes was tied to progression, which could give players substantial gameplay advantages if purchased with real money. EA initially defended the lootboxes, leading to further controversy, though the company eventually disabled microtransactions in the game. Following launch, a new progression system was introduced.

The game was released worldwide on November 17, 2017, for PlayStation 4, Xbox One, and Microsoft Windows. Battlefront II received mixed reviews from critics, with praise for the multiplayer, gameplay, balancing, visuals, and variety, but criticism for its single-player modes, campaign, microtransactions, and progression system. After its release, the game received numerous content additions through free updates, some of them tie-ins to recently-released content, in an attempt to repair its reputation after launch, which brought in a large number of new players. These updates ended on April 29, 2020, after Electronic Arts concluded that the game had reached its desired number of players and had substantially improved since the initial release. A Celebration Edition of the game, which includes all in-game cosmetic options, was released on December 5, 2019.

== Gameplay ==
Star Wars Battlefront II features content from the Clone Wars, which was absent in the game's predecessor.

Star Wars Battlefront II is a third- and first-person shooter with both single-player and multiplayer game modes. Different gameplay options are available; players can partake in ground battles as soldiers or space battles as starfighters. It includes three distinct eras from the Star Wars saga: the Clone Wars, with battles between the Galactic Republic and the Confederacy of Independent Systems; the Galactic Civil War, with battles between the Rebel Alliance and the Galactic Empire; and the war between the Resistance and the First Order. Each faction has its type of soldiers (e.g. clone troopers for the Republic, battle droids for the CIS, and stormtroopers for the Empire and the First Order) and starfighters. While the soldiers have identical controls and differ only in appearance, the starfighters feature unique abilities that offer a more varied gameplay style.

Battles take place across a variety of maps, which can vary based on the era. At launch, the game featured a total of 15 locations from the Star Wars universe, including Kamino, Kashyyyk, Naboo, Mos Eisley, Yavin IV, Hoth, Cloud City, Endor, the Death Star II, Jakku, Takodana, and Starkiller Base, as well as some space-exclusive locations, namely Ryloth, Fondor, and the Unknown Regions. Since then, eight more maps have been added: Crait, Jabba's Palace, Kessel, Geonosis, Felucia, Ajan Kloss, Scarif, and another space-only location, D'Qar. Some of the ground locations are also limited to certain game modes.

=== Classes ===
Battlefront II features class-based gameplay. All factions have the same four soldiers classes—Assault, Heavy, Officer, and Specialist—and three starfighter classes—Fighter, Interceptor, and Bomber (although the Resistance and the First Order do not feature the Bomber class). The ground battles feature additional Reinforcement classes, which are unlocked by trading in 'battle points', earned from defeating enemies and completing map-specific objectives. All factions have three soldier Reinforcements—the Enforcer, Aerial, and Infiltrator—and two vehicle Reinforcements—the Speeder and Armor. The four standard trooper classes do not require battle points to use. The Republic, CIS, Rebels, Empire, and First Order have an additional Reinforcement class—the Artillery—which is featured only in specific maps for the Galactic Assault mode (e.g. the MTT for the Separatists, which is available only on Naboo and Kashyyyk).

All classes can be leveled up except Artillery. After reaching a new level, the player is awarded a Skill Point that can be used to unlock or upgrade a Star Card. Star Cards are the main form of progression in Battlefront II, and can be equipped on a class to increase one of their stats, such as health regeneration or damage output, or to replace one of their abilities with a new one. Some star cards can only be unlocked once a certain level is reached. Up to three Star Cards can be equipped at the same time for each class. Every class has individual star cards that are only available for that class, with the exception of a few basic ones, such as extra health.

Players can also customize their soldier classes by purchasing new appearances or unlocking new weapons through milestones. Although the game features limited weapon customization, each weapon is unique and offers a different playstyle. Furthermore, players can unlock weapon attachments, which can alter a weapon's stats like range and fire rate. The Reinforcement classes can also be leveled up and customized, but their weapons and abilities cannot be changed.

=== Heroes ===
Aside from the basic soldier and Reinforcement classes, players can take on the role of several heroes or villains based on iconic Star Wars characters. Unlike Battlefront, heroes are an actual class (rather than a bonus) and can be leveled up and receive new appearances. In multiplayer, heroes are only available in the Galactic Assault and Supremacy modes, and, similarly to Reinforcements, are unlocked by trading in 4000 'battle points'. In the former mode, players can select any hero from the roster offered by the game; in the latter, only era-specific heroes are available. Excluding major events, where this limit is lifted, both sides are allocated a maximum of two heroes in Supremacy, and three in Galactic Assault. There are also several hero-centered game modes, like Heroes vs. Villains and Hero Showdown where only heroes can be used without the aforementioned limitations.

== Synopsis ==
The story begins with Iden Versio (Janina Gavankar), commander of the Galactic Empire's elite special forces unit, Inferno Squad, is held captive aboard the Invincible Faith, a Rebel Alliance Star Cruiser. Iden commands her ID10 droid, Dio, to free her from confinement, before she erases an Imperial transmission detailing the Emperor's plans to ambush the rebels on Endor. After escaping out the airlock into deep space, Iden is picked up by the Corvus, Inferno Squad's flagship, where she debriefs the mission's success to her squadmates, Del Meeko (T. J. Ramini) and Gideon Hask (Paul Blackthorne).

During the Battle of Endor, (Note: As depicted in Return of the Jedi (1983)) Inferno Squad eliminates a rebel patrol guarding the Death Star II's destroyed shield generator, before suddenly witnessing the destruction of the Death Star in Endor's skies. Inferno Squad escapes the moon before as it is being overrun by rebel forces, and land on the Star Destroyer Eviscerator, commanded by Iden's father, Admiral Garrick Versio (Anthony Skordi). The Admiral informs his daughter about the Emperor's death, while a messenger droid conveys the late Emperor's final command to initiate the secret Operation: Cinder. Admiral Versio sends Iden and Hask to an Imperial shipyard in Fondor's orbit to work with the Star Destroyer Dauntless as it prepares experimental satellites vital to the success of Operation: Cinder. Meanwhile, Del heads to Pillio to destroy one of the Emperor's hidden vaults, where he encounters Luke Skywalker (Matthew Mercer). The duo team up to fend off the local wildlife and access the vault, containing the Emperor's spoils of conquest, one of which Luke takes for himself. The pair part amicably, as Del begins to question the Empire's goals and motives.

Inferno Squad's next assignment is to head to Vardos, Iden's homeworld, where they are tasked to extract Imperial Protectorate Gleb just as Operation: Cinder is about to begin. As Cinder's satellites slowly ravage Vardos in storms, Iden and Del, disillusioned by the Empire's actions, abandon the mission to instead rescue civilians, causing Hask to betray them. The duo escapes to the Corvus, now traitors to the Empire. Seeking out the rebellion, they meet General Lando Calrissian (Billy Dee Williams), who gives them the choice of helping stop Operation: Cinder, or escaping to start new lives. Choosing to help, they aid Princess Leia Organa (Misty Lee) in protecting Naboo, destroying Cinder's satellites, and reactivating the planet's defenses. After Naboo is liberated, Iden and Del officially defect to the New Republic.

Months later, the new Inferno Squad — Iden, Del, and rebel agent Shriv Suurgav (Dan Donohue) — head to Takodana to find General Han Solo (John Armstrong), who went missing during his mission to extract critical data from an Imperial defector. After Han and the defector make their way past a stormtrooper squad to the Millennium Falcon, Inferno Squad arrives to help them escape the planet. The data reveals that Admiral Versio is commanding Imperial operations on Bespin and Sullust. Iden and Del head to Bespin to attempt to capture the Admiral, but instead walk into a trap laid by Hask. The pair escape, destroying a Star Destroyer fueling station in the process. On Sullust, Lando and Shriv investigate and destroy a hidden Imperial weapons factory. With both operations crippled, the Imperial fleet makes a last stand at Jakku. During the battle, Iden shoots down Hask and boards the Eviscerator, intending to rescue her father. Admiral Versio decides to go down with his ship, feeling obligated to die with the Empire he fought to protect, and urges Iden to escape and live a new life, commending her for seeing the Empire's weaknesses. Iden takes an escape pod and reunites with Del and Shriv. Iden and Del embrace and kiss, as the battle marks the end of the Galactic Empire.

Three decades later, Del is captured on Pillio by Gleb, who hands him over to Kylo Ren (Matthew Wood) and the First Order. Kylo interrogates Del for the map to Luke Skywalker, before leaving him to Hask, now a First Order officer. Hask expresses disgust at Del for choosing to start a family with Iden instead of remaining a soldier, before executing Del. Hask then tells Gleb that the New Republic cannot find out about "Project Resurrection" and orders her to leave the Corvus on Pillio as bait to lure Iden out of hiding.

=== Resurrection ===
Shriv, now an agent for the Resistance, discovers the abandoned Corvus and informs Iden and her daughter Zay (Brittany Volcy), revealing that Del had been helping the Resistance investigate rumors of mass disappearances that may be connected to Project Resurrection. They head to Athulla, where Del was last seen, and are ambushed by a Jinata Security fleet, which they destroy. The survivors admit that they had been kidnapping children on behalf of the First Order and that Project Resurrection had been moved to Vardos.

Iden and Shriv investigate the ruins of Vardos, leaving Zay on the Corvus, and are captured by Hask, who reveals that he killed Gleb and Del and that the First Order already used Starkiller Base to destroy the Hosnian system, effectively wiping out the New Republic. (Note: As depicted in Star Wars: The Force Awakens (2015)) He then orders his Star Destroyer, the Retribution, to destroy the Corvus, though Zay survives by taking an escape pod. Meanwhile, Jinata Security, angry at the First Order for betraying them, attack Hask's men, and Iden and Shriv make their way through the crossfire to rescue Zay.

Deciding to help the Resistance, the trio use stolen TIE fighters to board the Retribution, whereupon they search the ship for information on Project Resurrection, eventually discovering that it involves the First Order kidnapping children and indoctrinating them to become the next generation of stormtroopers. They also learn that the First Order has built up a massive fleet large enough to retake the galaxy and steal the plans of a First Order Dreadnought. While Shriv goes to look for a ship for their escape, Iden and Zay destroy the Retribution's hyperspace generators, causing it to pull out of hyperspace near Starkiller Base, just as the Resistance destroys it. Hask ambushes them and shoots Iden before she throws him to his death. Iden then succumbs to her injury, not before ordering Zay to escape with the Dreadnought plans and without her. Zay reunites with Shriv and the pair escape the Retribution, before linking up with the Resistance. They transmit the plans to General Leia Organa, who gives her condolences, before ordering them to head to the Outer Rim to gather more allies.

== Post-launch content ==
It was confirmed during EA Play 2017 that Star Wars: Battlefront II would not feature a Season Pass. Instead, all downloadable content was released via free title updates, split into multiple "seasons". (Note: Attributed to multiple sources:)

Since April 29, 2020, after EA concluded that the game had reached its desired number of players and had substantially improved since its initial release, the game no longer receives support for new content updates.

=== The Last Jedi Season ===
The first season, based on the 2017 film Star Wars: The Last Jedi, was released on December 5, 2017, ten days before the release of the film. It added content based on the film, including a space map over D'Qar, a new Galactic Assault map on the planet Crait, Finn and Captain Phasma as heroes for the Resistance and First Order, respectively, and Tallie Lintra's RZ-2 A-Wing as a new hero ship. The Last Jedi season also included a continuation of the single-player campaign, titled Battlefront II: Resurrection, which was made available on December 13.

=== Solo: A Star Wars Story Season ===
On May 3, 2018, EA Star Wars announced on Twitter stating that the second season of content would be based on the film Solo: A Star Wars Story. The first part of the season was released on May 16 and added a new game mode called Hero Showdown, starfighters to the Arcade, and a returning map from 2015's Star Wars Battlefront, Jabba's Palace, along with skins for Leia Organa and Lando Calrissian based on their disguises in Return of the Jedi. The second part was released on June 12 and added a new map set in the mines of the planet Kessel and a new variation of the Millennium Falcon (based on its appearance in Solo) as a hero ship, along with reintroducing the game mode Extraction, initially available only on the two new maps added with this season. New skins were also released for Han Solo, Lando Calrissian, and Chewbacca, based on their appearances in Solo.

=== Clone Wars Season ===
In February 2018, the game's design director, Dennis Brännvall, teased that content based on the Clone Wars era, primarily the animated series Star Wars: The Clone Wars, would be released at some point in the future. At EA Play 2018 it was revealed that said content will be released in the fall of the same year, and will include a new Galactic Assault map set on Geonosis, new clone trooper skins, and Anakin Skywalker, Obi-Wan Kenobi, General Grievous and Count Dooku as new playable heroes, with the actors who voiced them in The Clone Wars recording new voice lines for them. On October 30, Grievous was added as a new villain for the Separatists, along with an alternative skin. On November 28, the Geonosis map and Obi-Wan Kenobi were added to the game, along with new reinforcement classes, 212th Attack Battalion clone skins, and new skins for Grievous and Obi-Wan.

An update released on January 23, 2019, added Count Dooku to the game and made the Geonosis map available for other game modes. On February 27, Anakin Skywalker was added, along with new skins for him, Dooku, and clone troopers, voice lines for all heroes, and a rework of emotes. On March 26, the widely anticipated Capital Supremacy mode was released, along with the Infiltrator class and a major gameplay overhaul. On April 24, a new Kashyyyk map for Capital Supremacy was added, alongside some challenges and a new skin for Leia Organa, in celebration of Star Wars Day. On May 22, a new Kamino map for Capital Supremacy was added. On June 21, a new Naboo map for Capital Supremacy was added, alongside new skins for Anakin Skywalker and clone troopers, the Droideka as a new variation of the Enforcer class for the Separatists, and the TX-130 assault tank as a new variation of the Armor class for the Republic.

An update released on August 28, 2019, added new skins for battle droids, the maps from Capital Supremacy to the Heroes vs. Villains mode, and new Star Cards to replace the Health on Kill ones, with Health on Kill now becoming a passive ability for all heroes. On September 25, a new Felucia map for Capital Supremacy was added, along with Clone Commandos as a new variation of the Enforcer class for the Republic, a new skin for Luke Skywalker, and two game modes: an offline mode called Instant Action, and a PvE game mode called Co-Op, both of which included all Capital Supremacy maps released thus far. Furthermore, the Daily Crates and the Extraction mode were removed (the latter being merged with Strike). On October 23, the Ewok Hunt and Co-Op modes received major overhauls, and a Felucia map for Heroes vs. Villains was added, alongside new skins for the Jet Trooper, Luke Skywalker, and Han Solo.

=== The Rise of Skywalker Season and Celebration Edition ===
On December 5, 2019, a Celebration Edition of the game was released, including all cosmetic options released thus far; it can be bought both separately or as an upgrade to the original version. Along with the Celebration Edition came an update, originally meant for late November, which added new skins for the Infiltrator and Enforcer classes and a gameplay overhaul. On December 17, an update was released that added content based on the film Star Wars: The Rise of Skywalker, including a new Ajan Kloss map, Co-Op to the sequel trilogy era, new skins for Rey, Finn and Kylo Ren, and new Reinforcement classes for the sequel trilogy era (the Ovissian Gunner as the Enforcer and the Caphex Spy as the Infiltrator for the Resistance, and the Sith Trooper as the Infiltrator and the Jet Trooper as the Aerial for the First Order). On February 3, 2020, an update originally meant for late January added BB-8 and BB-9E as new heroes for the Resistance and First Order, respectively, Capital Supremacy and Instant Action to the sequel trilogy era, and several gameplay changes. On December 19, 2024, the complete edition was made available on the Xbox Game Pass subscription service catalogue for no extra cost, a limited time.

=== Original Trilogy updates ===
On February 26, 2020, a major update added content based on the original Star Wars trilogy, including the Co-Op mode, four new weapons (three of them returning from 2015's Star Wars: Battlefront), and the Infiltrator class, along with new skins for this era's pre-existing Reinforcement classes. It also added a new Geonosis map to Heroes vs. Villains, and the maps from the prequel era Capital Supremacy to Co-Op, along with several changes to the gameplay. The next update, initially meant for late March, was delayed twice: once for "mid-April", and the second time for late April. The update was released on April 29, and added content based on the film Rogue One, including a Scarif map and new skins for both Rebel soldiers and Imperial stormtroopers. It also added a new offline game mode called Instant Action Missions (which was merged with the original Instant Action), Capital Supremacy to the original trilogy era, and new skins for Rey, Kylo Ren, Emperor Palpatine, and Darth Maul, and made Palpatine and Chewbacca available as heroes for the sequel trilogy era, and Yoda and Darth Maul for the original trilogy era.

== Development and marketing ==
On May 10, 2016, the development of Star Wars Battlefront II was announced, led by DICE, with Motive Studios being responsible for the single player campaign and Criterion Games responsible for the starfighters gameplay and mechanics. During an earning call, EA chief financial officer Blake Jorgensen stated the game would have content from the sequel trilogy of films. Creative director Bernd Diemer revealed that the company had replaced the Season Pass system of paid expansion of content, because that system was determined to have "fragmented" the player community of the 2015 predecessor game. The new expansion system is designed to allow all players "to play longer". Executive producer Matthew Webster announced on April 15, 2017, at Star Wars Celebration that the worldwide release of the game would be November 17, 2017. The Battlefront II beta test period started on October 4, 2017, for players who pre-ordered the game. It was expanded to an open beta on October 6 and ran until October 11. A 10-hour trial version was made available to EA Access and Origin Access subscribers on November 9, 2017.

A tie-in novel, Star Wars Battlefront II: Inferno Squad, was released on July 25, 2017. Written by Christie Golden, it serves as a direct prelude to the game and follows the exploits of the Galactic Empire's titular squad as it seeks to eliminate what was left of Saw Gerrera's rebel cell after the events of the 2016 film Rogue One. On November 10, 2017, Electronic Arts announced the first in a series of free downloadable content for the game, featuring the planets D'Qar and Crait and the playable hero characters Finn and Captain Phasma, as a tie-in to Star Wars: The Last Jedi.

A small LEGO set based on Inferno Squad, called the "Inferno Squad Battle Pack", was released in early 2019. Iden Versio was added as a playable character to the mobile free-to-play turn-based role-playing game Star Wars: Galaxy of Heroes in January 2022, ahead of the game's fifth anniversary.

== Microtransactions controversy ==
During pre-release beta trials, the game's publisher EA was criticized by gamers and the gaming press for introducing a loot box monetization scheme that gave players substantial gameplay advantages through items purchased in-game with real money. Responding to the controversy, developers had adjusted the number of in-game items a player receives through playing the game. However, after the game went into pre-release several players and journalists who received the pre-release copy of the game reported various controversial gameplay features, such as rewards being unrelated to the player's performance in the game. The poorly-weighed reward system combined with a weak inactivity detection allowed many players to use rubber bands to tightly tie their game controllers for automatically farming points during multiplayer battles, ruining the experience of other active online players.

=== "Pride and accomplishment" comment ===
On November 12, 2017, a Reddit user complained that although they spent US$80 to purchase the Deluxe Edition of the game, Darth Vader remained inaccessible for play and the use of this character required 60,000 credits. Players estimated that it would take 40 hours of "grinding" to accumulate enough credits to unlock a single hero. In response to the community's backlash, EA's Community Team defended the controversial changes by saying their intent to make users earn credits to unlock heroes was to give users "a sense of pride and accomplishment" after unlocking a hero. This response frustrated many Reddit users, resulting in hundreds of negative replies and a comment score of more than -667,000 (as of August 2026), making it the most downvoted comment in the site's history. In 2019, the comment was inducted into the Guinness World Records. In response to the community's outrage, EA lowered the cost of credits to unlock heroes by 75%. However, the credits awarded for completing the campaign were also reduced.

On the day before release, EA disabled microtransactions entirely, citing players' concerns that they gave buyers unfair advantages. They stated their intent to reintroduce them at a later date after unspecified changes had been made. The uproar from social media and poor press reception on its microtransactions had a negative impact on EA's share price which dropped by 2.5% on the launch day of the game. Analysts in Wall Street also lowered their expectations of the game's financial prospects. A Wall Street analyst writing for CNBC noted how video games are still the cheapest entertainment medium per hour of use, and even with the added microtransactions, playing Battlefront II was still notably cheaper than paying to see the theatrical release of a film. By the end of November 2017, EA had lost $3 billion in stock value since the launch of the game. On March 16, 2018, developer DICE announced an overhaul for the progression and economic system. Loot crates will only contain credits, one of the in-game currencies, and cosmetic items while crystals, the other in-game currency, can be bought solely to purchase cosmetic items for characters in the game. Progression for player abilities, or "Star Cards", is now linear as players must play a certain class or hero to unlock a "Skill Point" for that trooper or hero, which can then be used to purchase a new card or upgrade one the player already owns. The first part of this update was released on March 21, which included permanently unlocking all heroes and vehicles for players regardless of progression, while the second part was released in April.

=== Government responses ===
On November 15, 2017, two days before its release, the Belgian Gaming Commission announced that it was investigating the game, alongside Overwatch, to determine whether loot boxes constituted unlicensed gambling. In response to the investigation, EA claimed that Battlefront II's loot boxes do not constitute gambling. During the investigation, the Minister of Justice of Belgium, Koen Geens, said that if loot boxes were proven to violate gambling laws, he would work to ban them in any future video games sold in the European Union. On April 25, 2018, the Commission published its final report, concluding that paid loot boxes constituted gambling under Belgian law. It found that Overwatch, FIFA 18, and Counter-Strike: Global Offensive violated the law, while Battlefront II was not listed as a violation because EA had permanently removed paid loot boxes from the game.

Reacting to the conclusion of the Belgian gambling regulator's investigation, the head of the Dutch Gambling commission announced the start of their own investigation of Battlefront II and the issue in general, and asked parents "to keep an eye on the games their children play". Chris Lee, a member of the Hawaii House of Representatives, called Star Wars: Battlefront II "an online casino designed to trap little kids" and announced his intention to ban such practices in the state of Hawaii. Another representative compared playing Battlefront II to smoking cigarettes, saying: "We didn't allow Joe Camel to encourage your kids to smoke cigarettes, and we shouldn't allow Star Wars to encourage your kids to gamble." Singapore's National Council on Problem Gambling are monitoring the situation following the uproar on the game, as loot boxes do not fall under the Remote Gambling Act. Authorities in Australia are also investigating the situation. The Parliament of the United Kingdom investigated the concerns around loot boxes and whether they constitute gambling, and were later told by EA that lootboxes are "quite ethical and fun" and that they are the equivalent of Kinder Eggs. The UK Parliament later said that loot boxes do constitute gambling and should be regulated as such.

== Reception ==
Reception

Aggregate score
Aggregator	Score
Metacritic	(PS4) 68/100 (XONE) 66/100 (PC) 65/100

Review scores
Publication	Score
Destructoid	5/10
Edge	4/10
Electronic Gaming Monthly	7/10
Game Informer	6.5/10
GameRevolution	2.5/5
GameSpot	6/10
GamesRadar+	4/5
Giant Bomb	2/5
IGN	6.5/10 (2017); 8.8/10 (2019)
PC Gamer (US)	63/100

=== Critical response ===
Star Wars Battlefront II received "mixed or average" reviews, according to review aggregator website Metacritic.

In his 4 out of 5-star review for GamesRadar+, Andy Hartup praised the multiplayer but criticized the single-player modes, saying the game has a "very strong multiplayer offering tarnished by overly complicated character progression, and a lavish, beautiful story campaign lacking in substance or subtlety." Game Revolution felt the campaign started strong but weakened as it progressed, praising the multiplayer gameplay while criticizing the microtransactions, loot box progression system, and locking of heroes.

For EGM's review, Nick Plessas praised the multiplayer combat, balancing, and variety, but criticized the game's sustained focus on loot crates. Andrew Reiner of Game Informer gave the game 6.5 out of 10, writing "Answering the call for more content, Star Wars Battlefront II offers a full campaign and more than enough multiplayer material, but the entire experience is brought down by microtransactions." IGN's Tom Marks also gave the game 6.5 out of 10, saying "Star Wars Battlefront 2 has great feeling blasters, but its progression system makes firing them an unsatisfying grind."

The game was nominated for "Best Shooter", "Best Graphics" and "Best Multiplayer" in IGN's Best of 2017 Awards, and was a runner-up for "Most Disappointing Game" in Giant Bomb's 2017 Game of the Year Awards. In Game Informer's Reader's Choice Best of 2017 Awards, fewer readers voted for the game for "Best Co-Op Multiplayer". The website also awarded the game for "Best Graphics", "Best Audio" and "Biggest Disappointment" in their 2017 Shooter of the Year Awards.

In 2019, IGN's David Jagneaux reviewed the game and gave it 8.8 out of 10 (compared to the original review's 6.5 out of 10), saying, "After over two years of updates and changes, EA and DICE have redeemed this gorgeous shooter and turned it into one of the best multiplayer adaptations of the Star Wars universe to date." Jagneaux noted that the significant improvements were to the multiplayer portion of the game and that the single-player story remained "overly safe, short, and disappointing".

=== Sales ===
In the U.S., Star Wars Battlefront II was the second best-selling title in November, behind Call of Duty: WWII. Within its first week on sale in Japan, the PlayStation 4 version sold 38,769 copies, placing it at number four on the all-format sales chart. By December 2017, the game had sold 9 million copies worldwide. In January 2018, EA announced that the game missed their sales target, as they had hoped to sell 10 million copies in that time, and blamed the loot crate controversy.

=== Accolades ===
Year	Award	Category	Result	Ref.
2017	Game Critics Awards	Best Action Game	Nominated	
2017	Game Critics Awards	Best Online Multiplayer	Won	
2017	Gamescom 2017	Best Action Game	Nominated	
2017	Gamescom 2017	Best Multiplayer Game	Nominated	
2017	Ping Awards	Best International Game	Nominated	
2017	Golden Joystick Awards	Most Wanted Game	Nominated	
2017	Titanium Awards	Best Interpretation	Nominated	
2017	Titanium Awards	Best Action Game	Nominated	
2018	21st Annual D.I.C.E. Awards	Outstanding Achievement in Character (Iden Versio)	Nominated	
2018	21st Annual D.I.C.E. Awards	Outstanding Achievement in Sound Design	Nominated	
2018	2018 Italian Video Game Awards	People's Choice	Nominated	
2018	2018 SXSW Gaming Awards	Excellence in Convergence	Won	
2018	16th Annual Game Audio Network Guild Awards	Audio of the Year	Nominated	
2018	16th Annual Game Audio Network Guild Awards	Music of the Year	Nominated	
2018	16th Annual Game Audio Network Guild Awards	Sound Design of the Year	Nominated	
2018	16th Annual Game Audio Network Guild Awards	Best Interactive Score	Nominated	
2018	16th Annual Game Audio Network Guild Awards	Best Cinematic/Cutscene Audio	Nominated	
2018	16th Annual Game Audio Network Guild Awards	Best Audio Mix	Nominated	
2018	Nickelodeon's 2018 Kids' Choice Awards	Favorite Video Game	Nominated	
2018	14th British Academy Games Awards	Audio Achievement	Nominated	
2018	2018 Webby Awards	Action	Nominated	
2018	ASCAP Composers' Choice Awards	2017 ASCAP Video Game Score of the Year	Won	
2018	Develop Awards	Sound Design (EA DICE)	Won	

== Community ==
=== Modding ===
Star Wars Battlefront II maintains a healthy modding scene, with fans adding numerous content, including new heroes and villains such as Ahsoka Tano, the Mandalorian, and Cal Kestis (from Star Wars Jedi: Fallen Order), amongst others, to the game. A majority of these mods were made in response to new Star Wars content releases, like Star Wars: The Clone Wars season 7, Andor and The Mandalorian and Grogu, or from other popular media. In early 2020, a mod that replaces BB-8 with Grogu was released. After reports came out in October 2021 that hackers were running rampant on Battlefront II's multiplayer servers, an attempt to patch out common exploits hackers utilized was carried out in February 2022. Another batch of fixes were implemented in January 2026.

In December 2025, a community-developed custom server titled Kyber came out in an open beta state for the Windows version of the title; up until that point, that version's multiplayer servers had become a frequent victim of hacking, with no apparent action being taken by Electronic Arts and DICE. Kyber provides a server browser functionality similar to Battlelog, which did not feature in both of DICE's Battlefront titles in favor of automatic matchmaking. In January 2026, Kyber went open source.

=== Resurgence ===
In May 2025, the player count and popularity of Star Wars Battlefront II increased suddenly on Windows and Xbox platforms. This was attributed to the inclusion of Battlefront II's complete edition on the Xbox Game Pass subscription service catalogue, the final season of the Andor TV series, the twentieth-anniversary re-release of Star Wars: Revenge of the Sith, and a new Fortnite season themed around Star Wars. Buoyed by a community-wide call to play the game on May 24, the player count on Steam surged to almost 19,000 players, significantly exceeding the previous all-time peak of 10,000-concurrent players. Demand for a third installment in the Battlefront franchise rose dramatically. The resurgence was noticed by many ex-developers and actors who worked on Battlefront II and the wider Star Wars franchise, including actor Muhannad Ben Amor, who played Wilmon Paak in Andor. Then in June 2025, a sale event by EA helped push player count on Steam to almost 36,000 concurrent players, again breaking the all-time peak record.
