= WCD =

WCD may stand for:

- World Commission on Dams
- Worst Case Discharge
- Wearable cardioverter defibrillator
- World Compassion Day
