= Star Wars Battlefront II: Inferno Squad =

Star Wars book

Battlefront II: Inferno Squad
- The main cover of the book
- Author: Christie Golden
- Language: English
- Series: Star Wars; Star Wars Battlefront
- Genre: Adventure; War; Science fiction; Action Thriller; Espionage
- Publisher: Del Rey Books
- Publication date: July 25, 2017
- Publication place: United States
- Pages: 336
- ISBN: 9781524796808
- Followed by: Heir to the Jedi, by Kevin Hearne

Star Wars Battlefront II: Inferno Squad is a novel written by Christie Golden and published on July 25, 2017, by Del Rey Books. Set in the Star Wars universe, the story begins immediately after the events of Star Wars: Episode IV – A New Hope (1977) and follows Iden Versio, the protagonist of Star Wars Battlefront II's single-player campaign. It details the creation of Inferno Squad, the Imperial special ops unit featured in the game, and its early missions during the Galactic Civil War. Inferno Squad is the second book in the Star Wars: Battlefront tie-in novel series, following Battlefront: Twilight Company.

== Plot summary ==
The book starts with Iden Versio as a TIE fighter pilot protecting the Death Star from the Rebel Alliance's starfighters at the Battle of Yavin. In the aftermath of the battle and the Death Star's destruction, Iden is called to a secret meeting, where her father, Garrick Versio, announces the formation of Inferno Squad, a special forces unit to be led by Iden. After performing a mission to recover blackmail material from an Imperial Governor, the unit is tasked with extracting a Rebel that decided to defect to the Galactic Empire. During the mission, Inferno Squad recovers a data chip, before being assigned a new task: to infiltrate and destroy the Dreamers, a Rebel group that is the sole remnant of Saw Gerrera's Partisan faction. Eventually, the group is destroyed and Iden encounters their mysterious advisor, Lux Bonteri, a character in the animated series Star Wars: The Clone Wars and former senator and friend of Gererra.

=== Characters ===
Iden Versio serves as the main protagonist of the story while Gideon Hask, Del Meeko and Seyn Marana serve as secondary protagonists and Staven as the antagonist. Garrick Versio has a supporting role.

== Publishing ==
The book was published by Del Rey Books, a division of Penguin Random House, and was initially released on July 25, 2017.

== Reception ==
Megan Crouse of Den of Geek gave the book a 3.5 out of 5 rating, writing "After the first half is over, the tie-in novel loses some steam, but fans [...] will probably be satisfied by the majority of the story." Amy Ratcliffe of Nerdist wrote: "I couldn’t quite cheer for the successes Inferno Squad found, but I was riveted and invested in what happened next." Neil Harrington, writing for Dork Side of the Force, said the novel has a handful of memorable moments and "cool connections" to the Star Wars canon.

== See also ==
- List of Star Wars books
