= Jersey Surf Drum and Bugle Corps =

American drum and bugle corp

Jersey Surf
- Location: Camden, New Jersey
- Division: World Class
- Founded: 1990
- Director: Bob Jacobs

Jersey Surf Drum and Bugle Corps is a World Class competitive junior drum and bugle corps. Based in Camden, New Jersey, Jersey Surf is a member corps of Drum Corps International.

== History ==
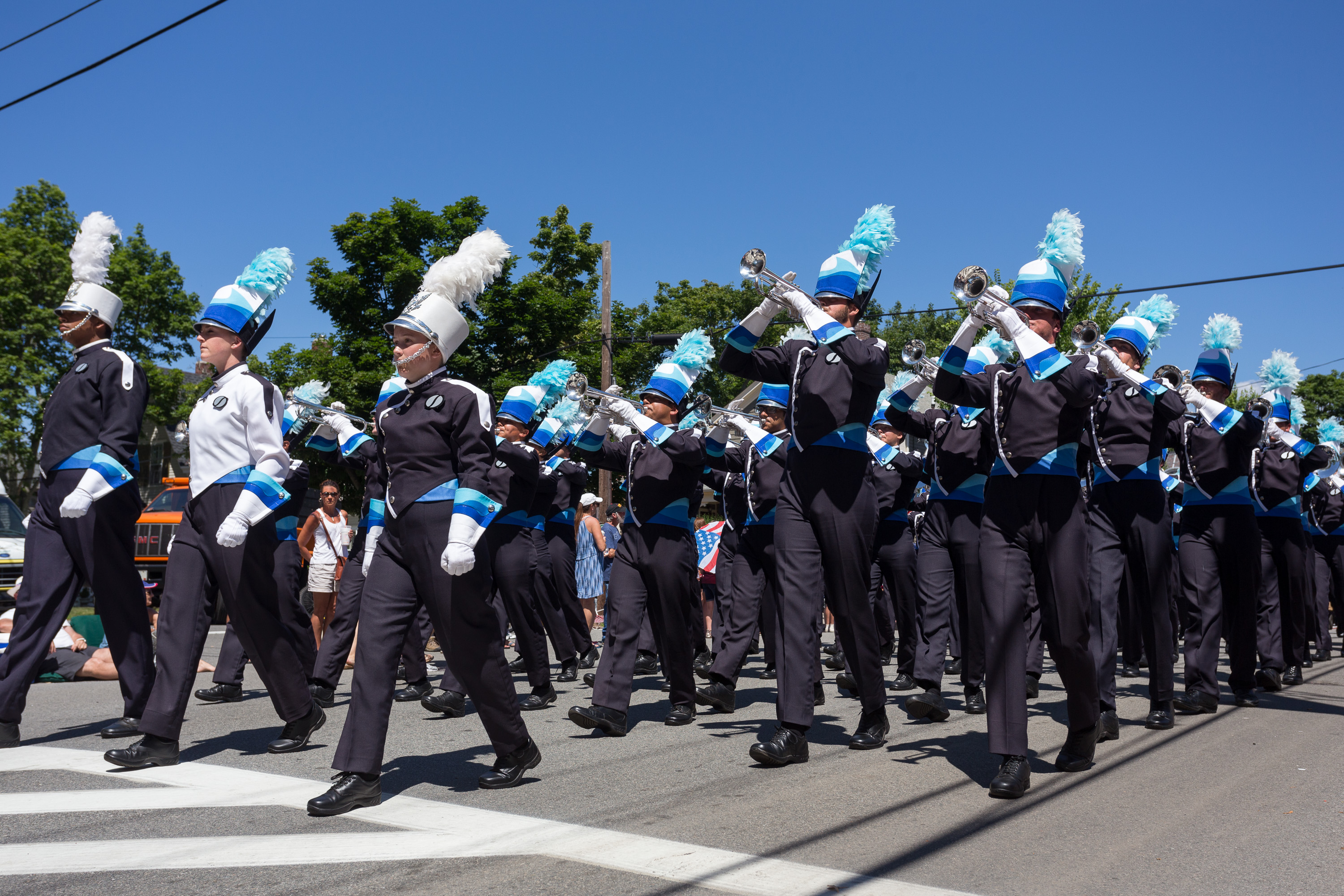
The Jersey Surf Drum and Bugle Corps marches in the Bristol, Rhode Island Fourth of July Parade in 2017

The Jersey Surf Drum and Bugle Corps was started in the winter of 1990 in Camden County, New Jersey by a group of area school band directors, led by Bob Jacobs, who wanted more performance opportunities for their students than halftime shows during football season. When an organizational meeting was held at Edgewood High School, more than fifty prospective members arrived from the southern New Jersey area, as well as from Pennsylvania and Delaware. The organization was chartered as Explorer Post 333 and began holding rehearsals at the Berlin Community School, moving to Berlin Park when warm weather arrived. The corps made its public debut on June 29, 1991, playing the National Anthem at the Independence Classic drum corps show at Franklin Field in Philadelphia. The corps wore rented high school band uniforms.

When the Surf entered competition in 1992, it had 102 members. The corps was undefeated in the Garden State Circuit. They also competed in three Drum Corps East (DCE) shows, and, in its first-ever DCI show, the Jersey Surf finished fourth of seven Division II and III corps at the DCI East Regional prelims. The corps, now based at Edgewood Junior High School in Atco, New Jersey purchased the corps' first equipment truck and two blue school buses. The corps made its debut at the DCI World Championships at the Division II prelims in Lowell, Massachusetts in 1994, finishing in fifteenth place among eighteen corps. In 1995 the corps added championship-caliber staff members and bought a semi-trailer equipment truck.

The 1996 Surf bought diesel buses, and after winter rehearsals at Fort Dix, was ready for the season and made its first Finals at DCE. Bus problems almost scuttled the tour to DCI in Orlando, Florida, but they arrived and finished seventh of thirteen Division II corps with their program "Cool Tunes from the Back of the Bus" that enhanced their growing reputation as a crowd-pleasing corps. In 1997 and '98, the corps expanded its touring and returned to DCI in Orlando, finishing in sixth both years and just missing the five corps Division II Finals. The 1998 corps was voted "Most Improved Division II Corps" by the Division II corps directors. The 1999, Surf was again Garden State Circuit Champions. They toured into Canada for the first time on the way to DCI World Championships in Madison, Wisconsin. At Camp Randall Stadium, the corps got the first of three standing ovations for their warm-up tune, "On, Wisconsin!" Finishing in fifth place of the twelve corps in prelims, the Jersey Surf made their first DCI Division II Finals. The 2000 season found the Surf riding the crest of the wave. They won three contests, including the DCI Atlantic championship, on their way to a return visit to Division II Finals. At College Park, Maryland, they were fifth of fourteen corps in prelims. Their fourth-place finish in Division II Finals earned them a berth in the Division I Quarterfinals, where they finished twenty-first.

Over the next six seasons, the Jersey Surf would be a consistent finalist within Division II, but would not truly challenge for the title until 2007. In 2004, the corps moved from Berlin to Mount Holly, although they continue to have facilities in both Berlin and New Brunswick and have camps in Sicklerville. The 2007 corps toured the West Coast, winning shows in Washington, Oregon, and California en route to DCI Championships in Pasadena. The Jersey Surf was in first place after DCI's Division II Quarterfinals, but was passed by the Spartans in Semifinals and took second place in Finals. In 2008, the Surf was undefeated until meeting the Blue Devils B in Ohio. Then, they were third in Open Class Quarterfinals in Michigan City, Indiana, a position they held through Semifinals and Finals in Bloomington, Indiana.

When the DCI Board of Directors approved the new, two-division competition format beginning in 2008, only World Class corps were guaranteed being paid for their performances. In light of this, following the 2008 season, the Jersey Surf Drum and Bugle Corps elected to leave Open Class and compete in World Class. After being evaluated by the DCI Board as to the organization's competitive and fiscal stability, the corps became a DCI World Class corps in 2009.

In 2015, Janina Gavankar filmed the music video "Don't Look Down" with Jersey Surf.

In 2025, Jersey Surf Inc., announced its withdrawal from the 2025 Drum Corps International Summer Tour. DCI stated that the decision reflected Jersey Surf's organization’s dedication to enhancing and expanding lower-cost, accessible programming while strengthening its general operating fund to better serve more young people in our region for years to come.

== Show summary (1992–2024) ==
Key
Light blue background indicates DCI Open Class Finalist
Pale green background indicates DCI World Class Semifinalist

Year	Repertoire	World Championships	
Year	Repertoire	Score	Placement
1992	Classics by Harry Connick Jr. and Doc Sevrenson; We Are in Love by Harry Connick, Jr. & Ramsey McLean / Stardust by Hoagie Carmichael / The Jersey Bounce by Tiny Bradshaw, Eddie Johnson, Bobby Plater & Buddy Feyne	Did not attend World Championships	
1993	A League of Their Own; Selections from A League of Their Own by Hans Zimmer	Did not attend World Championships	
1994	The Music of Barbra Streisand (Repertoire unavailable)	74.200	15th Place; Division II
1995	New Age Jazz of John Tesh and Yanni (Repertoire unavailable)	83.200	8th Place; Division II; Finalist
1996	Surf, Wind and Fire: Cool Tunes from the Back of the Bus (Repertoire unavailable)	84.100	7th Place; Division II; Finalist
1997	More Cool Times; Got To Get You Into My Life by John Lennon & Paul McCartney / Through the Fire by David Foster, Tom Keane & Cynthia Weil / Rock That by Maurice White & David Foster / For Once in My Life by Stevie Wonder	81.300	6th Place; Division II; Finalist
1998	Pictures of Spain – Interpretation of a Larry Kerchner Original; Portraits of Spain (Scenes 1, 2, and 3) by Larry Kerchner / Spanish Fantasy by Chick Correa / A Mis Abuelos by Arturo Sandoval	89.500	6th Place; Division II; Finalist
1999	It Ain't Necessarily Summertime; Summertime (from Porgy and Bess) by George Gershwin / Take Five by Paul Desmond / Waltz of the Mushroom Hunters by Greg Hopkins / A Night in Tunisia by John Birks Gillespie / It Ain't Necessarily So (from Porgy and Bess) by George Gershwin	88.700	5th Place; Division II; Finalist
2000	re-in-CARMEN-ation; Selections from Carmen by Georges Bizet	90.850	4th Place; Division II; Finalist
2001	Are We There Yet? – The Music of Mays and Metheny; Are We There Yet? by Lyle Mays / Have You Heard & See the World by Pat Metheny / Heat of the Day & The Awakening by Pat Metheny & Lyle Mays / In Her Family & The Truth Will Always Be by Pat Metheny / First Circle by Pat Metheny & Lyle Mays	89.850	6th Place; Division II; Finalist
2002	Our Side of the Story: Celebrating the Spirit of Youth; Prologue, Cool, I Feel Pretty & America (from West Side Story) by Leonard Bernstein	87.750	9th Place; Division II; Finalist
2003	Down the Shore with The Jersey Surf; Theme from A Summer Place by Max Steiner / Wipeout On The Waterfront / Set Free On the Boardwalk	89.900	5th Place; Division II; Finalist
2004	Lounging Around with the Fabulous Jersey Surf; Shangri-la by Matty Malneck, Robert Maxwell and Carl Sigman / This Could Be The Start of Something Big by Steve Allen / Girl From Ipanema by Antônio Carlos Jobim / Also Sprach Zarathustra by Richard Strauss / See See Rider (Traditional) / Hound Dog & Jailhouse Rock by Jerry Leiber and Mike Stoller / Can't Help Falling in Love by Hugo Peretti, Luigi Creatore & George David Weiss / My Way by Claude François & Jacques Revaux, adapted by Paul Anka	86.700	8th Place; Division II; Finalist
2005	The Jersey Surf Enjoys an Evening at the Pops; Symphony No. 5 in C Minor by Ludwig van Beethoven / William Tell Overture by Gioachino Rossini / Toccata and Fugue in D minor by Johann Sebastian Bach / Poet and Peasant Overture by Franz von Suppé / Barber of Seville by Gioachino Rossini / 2nd Hungarian Rhapsody by Franz Liszt / 1812 Overture by Peter Ilyich Tchaikovsky / Stars and Stripes Forever by John Philip Sousa	88.325	8th Place; Division II; Finalist
2006	The Jersey Surf Visits the Moulin Rouge; Selections from Moulin Rouge by Craig Armstrong, Baz Luhrmann & others	86.175	7th Place; Division II; Finalist
2007	Snapshots From An American Journey; California Dreamin' by John Phillips and Michelle Phillips / Theme from Shaft by Isaac Hayes / A River Runs Through It & Four Count Rhythm by Mark Isham / Unsquare Dance by Dave Brubeck / LA Confidential by Jerry Goldsmith	95.700	2nd Place; Division II; Finalist
2008	The Jersey Surf: So Far; How Far We've Come by Rob Thomas, Paul Doucette, Kyle Cook & Brian Yale / In Your Eyes by Peter Gabriel / One Day I'll Fly Away (from Moulin Rouge!) by Joe Sample & Will Jennings / Thnks fr th Mmrs by Patrick Stump and Pete Wentz	96.050	3rd Place; Division II; Finalist
2009	Mozart Effect; Overture from The Marriage of Figaro / Inspirations from Symphony No. 40 in G minor / The Lacrimosa from Requiem / Magic Flute, Act II: Pa-Pa-Pa-Papageno & Der Holle knocht in meinem Herz / Symphony No. 50 in G minor / Eine Kleine Nachtmusik; All by Wolfgang Amadeus Mozart	78.550	20th Place; World Class; Semifinalist
2010	Living the Dream; Organ Variations on America by Charles Ives / America the Beautiful by Samuel A. Ward / Festival Variations On A National Air by Dudley Buck	75.700	21st Place; World Class; Semifinalist
2011	Petal Tones: Shades of Rose; The Flower Song (from Carmen) by Georges Bizet / Bad Romance by Nadir Khayat & Stefani Germanotta / Habanera (from Carmen) by Georses Bizet / Libertango by Astor Piazolla / Kiss from a Rose by Seal / El Tango de Roxanne (from Moulin Rouge!) by Gordon Matthew Thomas Sumner (Sting) & Mariano Mores, adapted by Craig Armstrong / Toreador Song (from Carmen) by Georges Bizet	71.350	25th Place; World Class; Semifinalist
2012	Bridgemania! In the Stone by Maurice White, Allee Willis & David Foster / Land of Make Believe by Chuck Mangione / Tell William (William Tell Overture) by Gioachino Rossini / Pure Imagination by Leslie Bricusse & Anthony Newley / Party Rock Anthem by Stefan Gordy, Skyler Gordy, Jamahl Listenbee & Peter Schroeder	75.450	20th Place; World Class; Semifinalist
2013	Soul Surfin' – Bring on the Funk; Soul Intro by Jaco Pastorius / (Your Love Keeps Lifting Me) Higher and Higher by Gary Jackson, Raynard Miner & Carl Smith / Faces by Philip Bailey, Larry Dunn, Maurice White & Verdine White / Always and Forever by Rod Temperton / Let's Groove by Maurice White & Wayne Vaughan / That's the Way (I Like It) by H. W. (KC) Casey & Richard Finch / Proud Mary by John Fogerty / Apache by Jerry Lordan / Play that Funky Music by Robert Parissi / I Want You Back by Berry Gordy, Freddie Perren, Alphonzo Mizell & Deke Richards / Respect by Otis Redding	75.400	22nd Place; World Class; Semifinalist
2014	Pay It Forward; A Fantasia on Appalachian Spring by Aaron Copland / I Think It's Going to Rain Today by Randy Newman / Lean on Me by Bill Withers	75.800	22nd Place; World Class; Semifinalist
2015	Sun Surfing; Awakening by Colin Bell / Here Comes The Sun by George Harrison / Don't Let The Sun Go Down On Me by Elton John & Bernie Taupin / Wipeout by Bob Berryhill, Pat Connolly, Jim Fuller & Ron Wilson (The Surfaris) / Good Vibrations by Brian Wilson & Mike Love	68.750	28th Place; World Class
2016	Ebb & Flow; La Mer by Trent Reznor / La Mer by Andrew Yoziviak (inspired by Claude Debussy) / La Mer by Charles Trenet & Georges Augustin / Maelstrom by Robert Thatcher & Colin Bell / Asteraw from Cirque du Soleil's Zarkana by Nick Littlemore	71.988	26th Place; World Class
2017	Make It Our Own; Shofukan by Michael League (Snarky Puppy) / Chandelier by Sia & Jesse Shatkin / An Olive Tree by Kevin Robinson, Basia & Danny White	71.613	27th Place; World Class
2018	[mondo mondrian] Music for Pieces of Wood by Steve Reich / Cornfield Chase from Interstellar) by Hans Zimmer / Variations on Manuel de Falla's Ritual Fire Dance (from El amor brujo) by Andrew Yozviak / Etude Op 10 No. 12 in C minor, Revolutionary by Frederic Chopin / Behind Blue Eyes by Peter Townshend / Symphony No. 4 by David Maslanka	69.925	30th Place; World Class
2019	FantaSea; Oceans by Goff Richards / Moses and Marco Polo Suite (from Marco Polo) by Ennio Morricone / The Legend of Atlan (from Aquaman) by Rupert Gregson-Williams / Op. 28: The Sea, Fantasy in E major for Orchestra by Alexander Glazunov / Aurora Awakes by John Mackey / He Commands the Sea (from Aquaman) by Rupert Gregson-Williams	75.900	24th Place; World Class; Semifinalist
2020	Season canceled due to the COVID-19 pandemic		
2021	No scored competitions		
2022	Meet Me In Atlantic City; Pure Imagination by Leslie Bricusse & Anthony Newley / Wayside Festival by Rick Dejonge / Big Girls Don't Cry by Bob Crewe & Bob Gaudio / Sherry by Bob Gaudio / Walk Like a Man by Bob Crewe &Bob Gaudio / Can't Take My Eyes Off Of You by Bob Crewe & Bob Gaudio / Who Loves You by Bob Crewe & Judy Parker / Livin' on a Prayer by Jon Bon Jovi, Richie Sambora & Desmond Child / December 1963 (Oh, What a Night) by Bob Gaudio & Judy Parker	73.875	25th Place; World Class; Semifinalist
2023	Express Yourself; Church of the Poison Mind by Michael Emile Craig / True Colors by Tom Kelly & Billy Steinberg / Express Yourself by Stephen Bray & Madonna / Born This Way by Stefani Germanotta & Jeppe Laursen	75.488	23rd Place; World Class; Semifinalist
2024	Surfadelic; Boogie Wonderland by Earth, Wind, and Fire / What is Hip? by Tower of Power / Can't Get Enough of Your Love by Barry White	74.425	24th Place; World Class; Semifinalist
2025	Corps inactive		
