= Iden Versio =

Video game character in the Star Wars franchise

- Star Wars Battlefront II character
- Iden Versio as she appears in Star Wars Battlefront II without a helmet
- First appearance: Battlefront II: Inferno Squad (2017)
- Created by: Walt Williams
- Voiced by: Janina Gavankar
- Motion capture: Janina Gavankar

In-universe information
- Affiliation: Galactic Empire; New Republic
- Family: Garrick Versio (father); Zeehay Versio (mother)
- Spouse: Del Meeko
- Children: Zay Versio (daughter)
- Origin: Vardos

Iden Versio is a fictional character in the Star Wars franchise. She is the commander of Inferno Squad, a group of elite Imperial soldiers, who eventually defects to the Rebel Alliance. Iden is the player character of the 2017 video game Star Wars Battlefront II, an action shooter developed by EA DICE in collaboration with Criterion Games and Motive Studios. She serves as the main protagonist of the game's single-player campaign, in which she is voiced and portrayed via motion capture by Janina Gavankar.

== Development and design ==
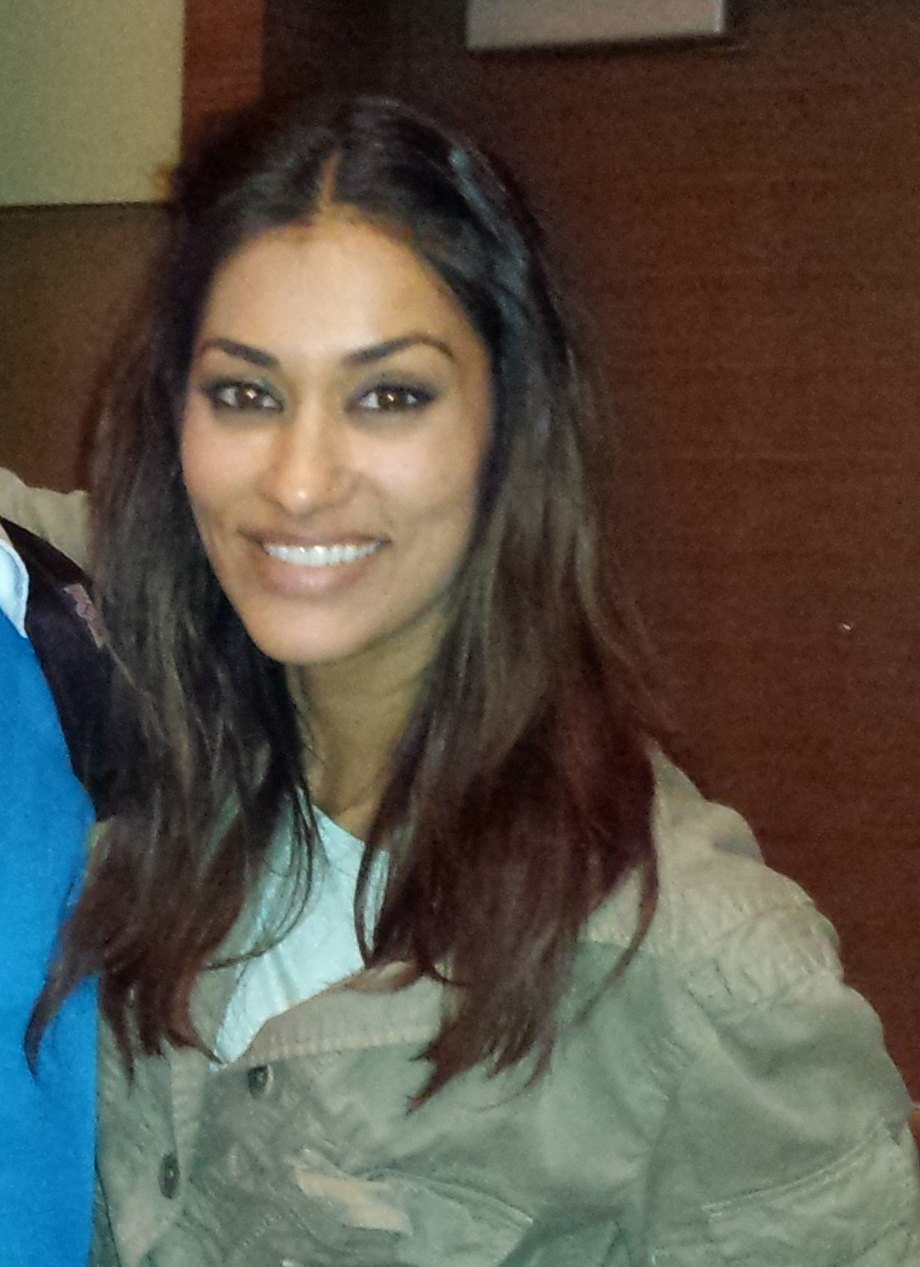
Janina Gavankar voiced and portrayed Iden Versio.

Battlefront II's campaign narrative and characters, including Iden, were developed by Electronic Arts' Motive Studios branch. Iden Versio is voiced and portrayed through motion capture by actress and musician Janina Gavankar. On the motion capture aspect of her performance, Gavankar commented "The technology has caught up so much that you can deliver a subtle performance and it will catch your micro-expressions [...] I decided to deliver as subtle of a performance as I would on camera."

During her audition process for the game, Gavanakar was not told that the project she was auditioning for was Battlefront II, nor that she was auditioning for the lead role, but noted that her knowledge of the gaming industry assisted her in "[putting] two and two together." She commented that "I just got an audition and it said [...] EA Motive. When you send someone like me, who is a hardcore gamer, an audition like this, I knew exactly what it was. I knew that if it was Motive that it was Battlefront." Gavankar commented that the development process for Iden was highly collaborative. She detailed that she "worked with the writers of the game and the writer of the book and we had access to a LucasFilm story group member every day on set. We really found out who [Iden] was together. We worked with military consultants to figure out how we moved together as a squad; all of these things took a lot of care and conversation."

Steve Blank, a creative executive for Lucasfilm, described Iden as a "tried and true and through and through Imperial." Gavankar detailed Iden as having an "unshaking loyalty to the Empire" as a result of her early life upbringing to be "the perfect soldier, the perfect officer." She commented that Iden "is a literal poster child for the Empire. Her father is an Admiral and her mother is a propaganda artist. She actually put Iden in posters." Gavankar added that "all the way up until the moment [the player begins Battlefront II], [Iden's] story has been dark, dark, dark side." Despite this, Iden's characterization has been described as "grey" and "complex", due to events that unfold in Battlefront II. VentureBeat details that that complexity drew Gavankar to the role. Gavanakar also detailed that even though Iden defects to the Rebellion, she still misses the order, cleanliness, and respect that the Empire carried itself with.

== Appearances ==
=== Novels ===
Iden Versio debuted in Star Wars Battlefront II: Inferno Squad, a tie-in novel for the 2017 video game Star Wars Battlefront II. The novel was written by Christie Golden and released on July 25, 2017. Janina Gavankar provided the voice for the novel's audiobook version. The book's events directly precede those of the video game, and depict the formation of and early missions undertaken by Inferno Squad. The group's formation is authorized by the Empire after the Rebellion steals the plans to the Death Star and destroys the battle station. In the main plot, Inferno Squad is tasked with infiltrating and eliminating "the Dreamers", who are the remainder of Saw Gerrera's extremist rebel group, the Partisans.

In Inferno Squad, the unit is established with Iden as its commanding officer; the other members include Gideon Hask, a fellow pilot who graduated top of his class at the Coruscant Imperial University, Del Meeko, a TIE fighter pilot and an engineering expert, and Seyn Marana, an intelligence prodigy and master cryptologist. Iden is also noted for holding the record for most verified kills in battle. Admiral Garrick Versio, Iden's father, serves as the squad's supervisor.

=== Video games ===
Iden Versio's first video game appearance was in Star Wars Battlefront II (2017), where she is portrayed by Janina Gavankar. She is the main protagonist of the single-player campaign, and is also a playable character in the game's multiplayer mode. The campaign establishes Iden as the commander of Inferno Squad, an Imperial special forces unit. Gavankar also described Inferno Squad as a black ops unit. The squad includes Gideon Hask and Del Meeko, as well as "Dio", an ID10 seeker droid that serves as Iden's companion and assists her in infiltration and sabotage. T. J. Ramini, Del Meeko's voice actor, noted that Iden and Del "have a bit of a banter, a bit of a laugh," throughout the game.

The campaign begins with Iden in Rebel captivity after allowing herself to be apprehended so she could delete an intercepted Imperial transmission detailing Emperor Palpatine's plan to ambush the Rebel Alliance at Endor. After escaping, Iden reunites with Del and Hask as they are all dispatched to Endor to help defend the Death Star II's shield generator. Iden leads Inferno Squad against the Rebellion during the Battle of Endor, where they witness the destruction of the second Death Star. Iden escapes from Endor and meets with her father, Admiral Garrick Versio, who informs her of Palpatine's death during the Death Star's destruction. Through a message recorded by the Emperor before his death, Iden learns of Palpatine's contingency plan in the event of the Empire's defeat, known as Operation: Cinder, which involves the devastation of various planets under Imperial occupation to instill fear and emphasize the Empire's authority. One of the planets targeted by Operation: Cinder is Iden's homeworld of Vardos.

Inferno Squad is sent to Vardos to retrieve Protectorate Gleb, an Imperial ally, but after witnessing the planet's devastation during Operation: Cinder, Iden is left conflicted as she begins to question the nature of the Empire. After disobeying Imperial orders not to rescue civilians, Iden and Del ultimately defect from the Empire and escape Vardos, but Hask stays behind. The player continues to control Iden following her defection, as she and Del go on to join the New Republic and help it defend Naboo from Operation: Cinder. After performing more missions on behalf of the New Republic, Iden, Del, and their new squadmate, Shriv Suurgav, participate in the Battle of Jakku, the final military conflict of the Galactic Civil War. During the battle, Iden shoots down Hask's TIE fighter and boards her father's Star Destroyer, trying to convince him to escape, but he elects to go down with his ship, dying alongside the Empire he served. Iden, encouraged by her father to live for herself, escapes from the Star Destroyer and reunites with Del and Shriv, beginning a romantic relationship with the former. In the campaign's epilogue, set 29 years later, it is revealed that Iden and Del have married and had a daughter. The campaign ends on a cliffhanger as Hask, who survived the Battle of Jakku and joined the First Order, tracks down and kills Del to lure Iden out of hiding.

Iden returns in the Star Wars Battlefront II: Resurrection downloadable content (DLC). Mitch Dyer, co-writer of Battlefront II, claimed that "when the Resurrection DLC begins, [...] Iden is in a time of peace. The galaxy is at peace — there is no war." While the initial Battlefront II campaign features chapters in which the player controls other characters like Luke Skywalker or Lando Calrissian, the Resurrection DLC focuses entirely on Iden. Dyer commented that this is because "one of the key pieces of feedback [the development team] got was that people really liked playing as Iden. She's an interesting and compelling new character in the Star Wars universe, so we wanted to really focus the rest of the story on her." Resurrection introduces Iden and Del's daughter, Zay. Following Del's disappearance, Iden, Zay, and Shriv Suurgav search for him and stumble upon Project Resurrection, the First Order's operation of abducting children from their homes and indoctrinating them to become stormtroopers. Eventually, the trio discover that Del was killed by Hask, and decide to learn more about Project Resurrection by boarding Hask's Star Destroyer. After retrieving information on the project and the plans of a First Order Dreadnought, Iden and Zay are confronted by Hask, who shoots the former before being killed. Iden succumbs to her injury following an emotional farewell to Zay, who escapes with Shriv in a stolen TIE fighter, contacts General Leia Organa, and is tasked with finding new allies for the Resistance.

Iden is mentioned in the 2020 video game Star Wars: Squadrons by Imperial pilot Havina Vonreg, who expresses spitefulness for Versio's defection to the New Republic. In January 2022, Iden was added as a playable character to the mobile free-to-play, turn-based role-playing video game Star Wars: Galaxy of Heroes.

=== Other ===
A Lego minifigure of Iden Versio, alongside three other Inferno Squad members, was released as part of the "Inferno Squad Battle Pack" in early 2019. An expansion to Fantasy Flight Games' Star Wars Legion released in 2020 includes an Iden Versio miniature figure and playing cards.

== Reception ==
The character of Iden Versio received mixed opinions. In a review of the Inferno Squad novel, Sean Keane of New York Daily News wrote that "We get POV sections from all four members of the squad, but Iden is by far the most developed. She's a great lead and the novel highlights the strengths and weaknesses of the idealized Imperial upbringing. She is a talented soldier, but struggles with emotion and attachment." In his review of Star Wars Battlefront II, Bryan Bishop of The Verge praised Janina Gavankar's performance, opining that she "delivers some real pathos with her performance." Bishop added, "[Iden] may be an Imperial, but she's also a hero in the classic Star Wars tradition: she fights for the ideals that have been instilled in her from birth, and carries with her the kind of devil-may-care swagger that made Han Solo a household name." Tom Hoggins of The Telegraph wrote that Gavankar joined an "exclusive club of women leading Star Wars stories, with Iden Versio standing alongside Daisy [Ridley]'s Rey and Felicity Jones' Jyn Erso from Rogue One."

In a negative review of Resurrection, Hayden Dingman of PCWorld opines that the setup for the DLC is promising due to the believability of Iden's stakes in comparison with the main campaign and the built-in emotional hook of Del Meeko's death, "compounded by Iden fighting alongside her daughter Zay." Dingman, however, added that "Battlefront II's campaign, proper ending included, is anemic start to finish. Just so much wasted potential. I don't know whether blame lies with Disney or with EA and DICE, but the developers had an amazing character in Iden Versio and did nothing with her." Samuel Roberts of PC Gamer had similar sentiments, commenting that "most of the tension is removed from the story" once "Iden Versio and her comrade, Del, basically join the Rebellion." Roberts criticized the lack of exploration of Iden's Imperial perspective, commenting that "in the opening, [the player gets] the sense that Iden and company believe in the sense of order that the Empire brings—but their perspective isn't explored with much greater depth than that. When they turn against the Empire, as the Empire turns on its own people, they make the snap decision to change sides with very little ambiguity."
