= Janina Gavankar =

American actress (born 1980)

- Gavankar in 2026
- Born: Janina Zione Gavankar; November 29, 1980 (age 45); Joliet, Illinois, U.S.
- Occupations: Actress; musician
- Years active: 2000–present
- Website: janinagavankar.com

Janina Zione Gavankar (/dʒəˈniːnə ɡəˈvɑːŋkər/; born November 29, 1980) is an Indian-American actress and musician. She is trained as a pianist, vocalist, and orchestral percussionist and majored in theatre at the University of Illinois Chicago. Her roles include Eva "Papi" Torres on Showtime's The L Word, Shiva on The League, Leigh Turner on The Gates, Luna Garza on HBO's True Blood, McKenna Hall on The CW's Arrow, Diana Thomas on Fox's Sleepy Hollow, and Qetsiyah/Tessa in The CW's The Vampire Diaries. Gavankar has also played the role of Ms. Dewey, a search engine and virtual assistant for Microsoft.

== Early life ==
Gavankar was born in Joliet, Illinois, to Ganesh "Peter" Gavankar, a Marathi engineer from Mumbai, India, who first travelled to the U.S. to pursue a master's degree, and Shan Demohra "Mohra" Gavankar, of half-Marathi and half-Dutch descent from Pune, also in India.

== Career ==
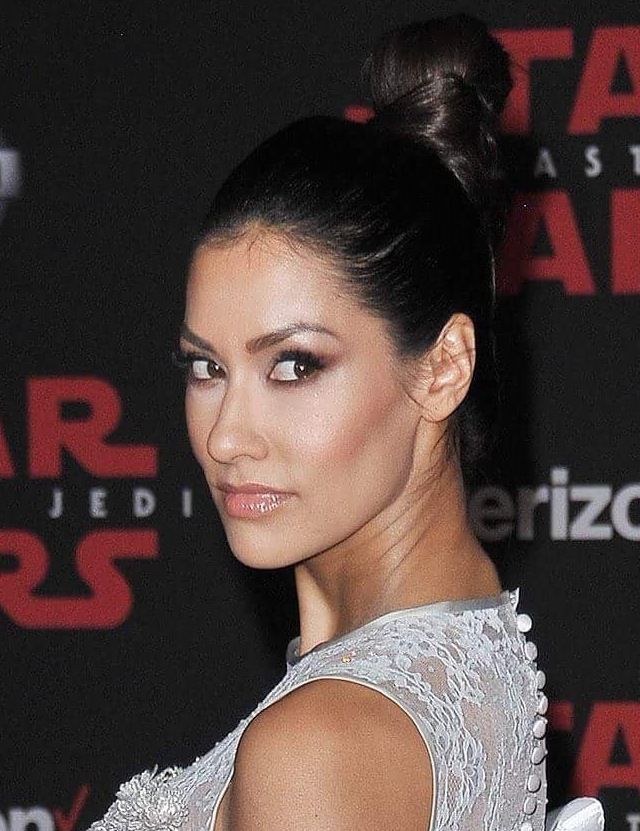
Gavankar at the premiere of Star Wars: The Last Jedi in 2017

Gavankar has acted in theatre, film, television, and online. Her most notable roles include Iden Versio, a canon Star Wars character and the protagonist of Star Wars: Battlefront II; shapeshifter Luna Garza in True Blood, Papi in The L Word; Ms. Dewey, the personification of a Microsoft live search engine; and Shiva, the namesake of the sought after trophy on The League. She regularly appears in Funny or Die shorts.

In 2006, she joined the cast of The L Word as a series regular and shot all of the clips used for Ms. Dewey. In 2007, she landed a lead role in the CW pilot, Dash 4 Cash. In 2008, Gavankar appeared in the TV series Stargate Atlantis, Grey's Anatomy, NCIS, My Boys, and Factory. In 2009, she appeared in the TV shows The Cleaner, Dollhouse, Three Rivers, and The League, as well as indie films, Men, Interrupted, Indian Gangster, and Quantum Quest: A Cassini Space Odyssey. Gavankar provided the voice of Nikki in Quantum Quest. She landed another lead role in The Gates, since cancelled, on ABC. She appears on CW's Arrow as a vice squad police officer and brief girlfriend to Oliver Queen.

Gavankar is a gamer and has appeared on, as well as co-hosted, G4 TV's Attack of the Show!, Epileptic Gaming's Up All Night, where she helped review Rock Band, Burnout Paradise, and Army of Two.

In 2011, Gavankar became a series regular in HBO's True Blood as a public school teacher and shapeshifter, Luna Garza, who gets romantically involved with one of the main characters of the series.

Her indie film, Satellite of Love, premiered at the Dallas International Film Festival in 2012, and her 2012 indie I'm Afraid of Virginia Wolf is currently in post-production. On December 20, 2012, Gavankar was the last person interviewed for original 2005–2012 run of Attack of the Show!, which aired on G4 TV.

On August 3, 2013, Gavankar landed a role as a witch named Qetsiyah in the fifth season of The Vampire Diaries. She guest starred in the third season of Husbands.

In 2014, she starred as Amita in the video game, Far Cry 4. She also played Detective Meredith Bose on The Mysteries of Laura from 2014 to 2016.

She starred as Iden Versio, the main character in the campaign mode of the 2017 Electronic Arts video game, Star Wars Battlefront II.

In 2018, she appeared in two films. Blindspotting premiered at the Sundance Film Festival, and The Vanishing of Sidney Hall was distributed by A24.

In late 2019, Gavankar joined Apple TV's The Morning Show, as Alison Namazi, co-anchor of the pop culture segment of the titular show.

Starting in 2021, Gavankar had a starring role as the antagonist in seasons 2 & 3 of the ABC hit show, Big Sky, playing the sibling in a mafia family.

In 2023 Gavankar starred in video game Alan Wake 2 as Kiran Estevez, an agent of the Federal Bureau of Control, a role she reprised in The Lake House DLC, released in October 2024.

=== Music ===
Gavankar returned to music with a cover of Kanye West's "Love Lockdown". Gavankar's former all-female singing group, Endera, was signed to Cash Money Records Universal Records.

She collaborated on a project for a song called "Tell Me What" in India with Pratichee Mohapatra of Viva, Deep, and Navraaz. She has had songs licensed to films and television and has sung and played marimba on film scores. Gavankar was featured in Russian artist Ella Leya's music video for "Wish I Could", in the music video by San Francisco-based band Recliner for their single "Float Away", as well as the music video for Manu Narayan's band Darunam.

In August 2012, she released the single for her upcoming EP, entitled Waiting for Godot, and in November, Billboard premiered the official music video. It went on to win numerous film festival awards.

While in high school, Gavankar auditioned for the front ensemble of the Phantom Regiment Drum and Bugle Corps of Rockford, Illinois. Before hearing whether she had made the corps, she was accepted for the Yale School of Drama's summer camp and went there. "I fell in love with drum corps when I was 13 years old", Gavankar has stated, and remains a strong fan of the activity. When she heard the Martin Garrix/Usher collaboration, "Don't Look Down", she had the idea of performing it as marching music. With assistance from Drum Corps International, she contacted the Jersey Surf Drum and Bugle Corps and arranger Colin Bell. She went into the studios in New York with fifty members of Jersey Surf and recorded the music video "Don't Look Down- #JustAddDrumCorps Edition" that was released in April 2015.

On May 20, 2015, Gavankar performed a percussion duet at Carnegie Hall with Questlove for the Best Buddies charity benefit.

=== Technology ===
Gavankar was the first actress to use Twitter, signing up on Richard Branson's computer on Necker Island in 2006.

Gavankar was the personification of Microsoft's interactive search engine Ms. Dewey.

In 2011, she created a free template for actors and artists to help them control their online presence and in 2012, spoke at the Suits and Spooks Conference about how she discovered a solution for data challenges faced by actors through the use of open source tools.

In 2017, she launched a private discussion forum for members of the games industry.

In 2018, she produced the first narrative film to use the Arri Alexa LF.

Gavankar is a first-round investor in ClassPass.

== Awards ==
In 2008, Gavankar was nominated for an Asian Excellence Award. In 2012, Gavankar received the Gravity Summit Award for Excellence in Social Media.

== Filmography ==
=== Film ===
Year	Title	Role	Notes
2000	Forward Anticipation in Chicago	Corrin	Short film
2001	Why Is God...	Mina	Short film
2002	Barbershop	Fine Woman	
2003	Dark	Kaya	
2004	Barbershop 2: Back in Business	Field Reporter	
2005	Just Speak	Melody	Short film
2005	Cup of My Blood	Iona	
2008	Shattered!	Maria	
2009	Indian Gangster	Geeta	Short film
2010	Quantum Quest: A Cassini Space Odyssey	Niki	Voice
2010	Men, Interrupted	Cece Twain	Short film
2011	The Custom Mary	Ms. Rime	
2011	Victory or Death	Selah	Short film
2012	Satellite of Love	Michelle	
2013	Who's Afraid of Vagina Wolf?	Katia Amour / The Stud	
2013	The Final Moments of Karl Brant	Detective Hostetler	Short film
2014	Code Academy	Madame Counselor	Short film
2014	Think Like a Man Too	Vanessa	
2016	Pee-wee's Big Holiday	Party Guest	
2017	The Vanishing of Sidney Hall	Gina	
2018	Blindspotting	Val	
2018	The White Orchid	Tina	
2019	Stucco	J	Short film Also director, writer and producer
2020	The Way Back	Angela	
2021	Encounter	Piya	
2024	Borderlands	Knoxx	
2026	Best of the Best	Rekha	

=== Television ===
Year	Title	Role	Notes
2004	Strong Medicine	Nurse Juni	Episode: "Omissions"
2007–2009	The L Word	Eva "Papi" Torres	12 episodes
2008	My Boys	Terri	Episode: "The Transitioning"
2008	Stargate Atlantis	Sergeant "Dusty" Mehra	Episode: "Whispers"
2008	Grey's Anatomy	Intern Lisa	2 episodes
2009	NCIS	Angela Lopez	Episode: "Caged"
2009	Dollhouse	Lynn	Episode: "Epitaph One"
2009	The Cleaner	Usha Patel	2 episodes
2009	Three Rivers	Ada Rahimi	Episode: "Place of Life"
2009–2015	The League	Shiva	10 episodes
2010	The Gates	Leigh Turner	13 episodes
2011	Traffic Light	Alexa	3 episodes
2011–2013	True Blood	Luna Garza	25 episodes
2012	The Exes	Kerry	Episode: "My Dinner with Phil"
2012	Choke.Kick.Girl: The Series	Katie	Episode: "Hammerfist, Knee, Guillotine Fiend"
2013	Love Is Dead	Marisol Rajagopal	Television film
2013	Arrow	Detective McKenna Hall	4 episodes
2013	The Goodwin Games	Hannah	Episode: "The Birds of Granby"
2013	Just Face It	Ava	Miniseries
2013	Husbands	Kajal	Episode: "I Dream of Cleaning"
2013	The Vampire Diaries	Qetsiyah / Tessa	4 episodes
2014	Nikki & Nora: The N&N Files	Lea Sadina	4 episodes
2014	Garfunkel and Oates	Dr. Sharma	Episode: "Third Member"
2014–2016	The Mysteries of Laura	Meredith Bose	38 episodes
2015	The History of Us	Sabrina	Television film
2017	Sleepy Hollow	Diana Thomas	13 episodes
2018	Hell's Kitchen	Herself (guest)	Episode: "Stars Heating Up Hell"
2019	Relics and Rarities	Mumeé	2 episodes
2019	You're The Worst	Rachel	Episode: "Zero Eggplants"
2019	Better Things	Nikki	2 episodes
2019–2021	The Morning Show	Alison Namazi	15 episodes
2020	Space Force	Hannah Howard	Episode: "Edison Jaymes"
2020–2022	The Mighty Ones	Kensington	Voice, 29 episodes
2021	Santa Inc.	Lakshmi (voice)	Episode: "The Announcement"
2021–2022	Big Sky	Ren Bhullar	18 episodes
2022	The Woman in the House Across the Street from the Girl in the Window	Meredith	2 episodes
2022	Star Wars: Tales of the Jedi	Pav-ti	Voice, episode: "Life and Death"
2023	Never Have I Ever	Akshara	Episodes: "...wrecked my future" and "...gone to prom"
2026	The Simpsons	Manjula Nahasapeemapetilon	Voice, episode: "Treehouse of Horror Presents: The Revengening"

=== Video games ===
Year	Title	Role	Notes
2014	Far Cry 4	Amita	
2017	Horizon Zero Dawn	Tatai	Also The Frozen Wilds DLC
2017	Star Wars Battlefront II	Iden Versio	Voice and motion capture
2019	Afterparty	Lola	
2022	God of War Ragnarök	Sinmara	Largely cut from the game's storyline; present in files
2023	Forspoken	Tanta Sila	Voice and motion capture
2023	Stray Gods: The Roleplaying Musical	Freddie	
2023	Alan Wake II	Agent Kiran Estevez	Also 'The Lake House' DLC
2027	Until Dawn 2	Anna Baas	

=== Audiobooks ===
Year	Title	Role	Notes
2017	Star Wars Battlefront II: Inferno Squad	Narrator	
2019	Randomize: Forward	Narrator	Short story

=== Crew work ===
Year	Title	Role	Notes
2020	The Mandalorian	Assistant Puppeteer	Uncredited; Episode: "Chapter 11: The Heiress"
