= Scott Plous =

American social psychologist (1959-)

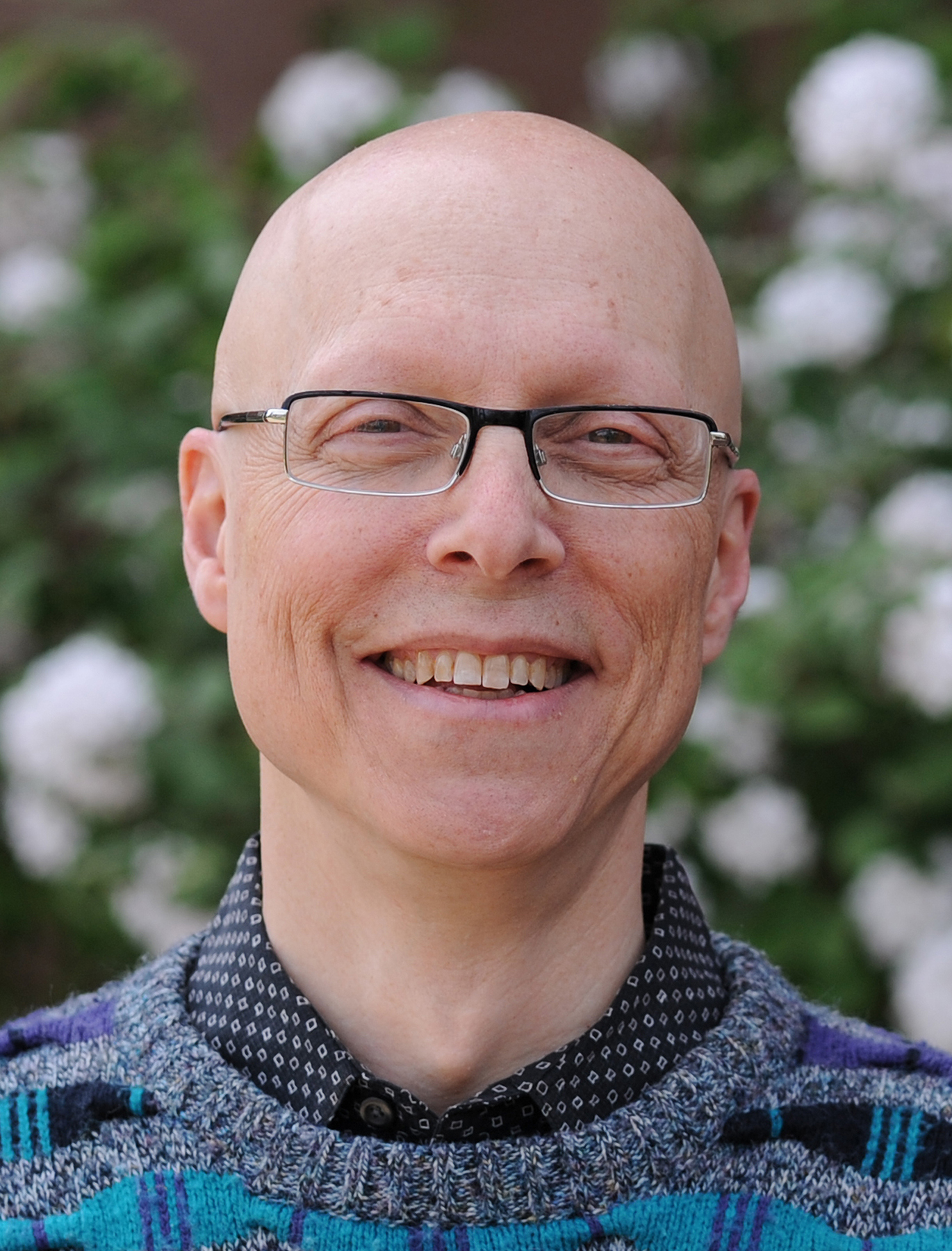
- Scott Plous in 2014
- Born: November 2, 1959; Milwaukee
- Citizenship: American
- Education: Stanford University
- Known for: Social Psychology Network
- Scientific career
- Fields: Social psychology
- Workplaces: Wesleyan University
- Doctoral advisor: Philip Zimbardo
- Website: www.socialpsychology.org/plous.htm

Scott Plous is an American academic social psychologist. He is currently a professor of psychology at Wesleyan University and executive director of Social Psychology Network.

== Early life and education ==
Scott Plous was born in Milwaukee, Wisconsin. He attended college at the University of Minnesota in Minneapolis, and earned his PhD in social psychology at Stanford University, where he also completed a MacArthur Foundation Postdoctoral Fellowship in International Peace and Cooperation. His doctoral advisor at Stanford was Philip Zimbardo.

== Career ==
After his postdoctoral fellowship, Plous spent two years as a visiting professor in psychology and arms control at the University of Illinois at Urbana–Champaign. He then joined the psychology faculty at Wesleyan University, where he has been a professor since 1990.

Throughout much of his career, he has focused on internationalizing psychology education, cross-cultural exchange, and teaching outside the United States. He has served as a visiting faculty member on two world voyages of Semester at Sea, co-taught in the Harvard University summer school program in Trento, Italy, and taught Social Psychology at Beijing Normal University in China.

Plous has published two books and numerous journal articles on psychology, decision science, and social issues. His primary areas of research include the psychology of prejudice and discrimination, judgment and decision making, international security, and the human use of animals and the environment.

== Notable Projects ==
=== Social Psychology Network ===
Plous is best known as the founder and Executive Director of Social Psychology Network, a nonprofit educational organization and a suite of nonprofit websites developed with support from the National Science Foundation, individual and institutional donors, and more than 1,500 members from over 100 countries. Created in 1996, the mission of the Network "is to promote peace, social justice, and sustainable living through public education, research, and the advancement of psychology."

Since the 1990s, the webpages of Social Psychology Network have received more than 385 million visits (as of March, 2023), and the number of people following the Network on social media has grown to more than 1 million worldwide.

=== Social Psychology MOOC ===
In 2013, Plous began teaching a free "massive open online course" (MOOC) in Social Psychology. In its first two years, the course became the largest synchronous class ever given, enrolling more than 720,000 students from approximately 200 countries. In 2018, he began teaching a self-paced version of the course that enrolled another 570,000 students as of 2023, or nearly 1.3 million students in all.

As part of the course, students are asked to complete a capstone assignment called the Day of Compassion, in which class members are challenged to live 24 hours as compassionately as possible and analyze the experience using social psychology. On three runs of the course, the best student work was honored with a "Day of Compassion Award" in which the winner received an expense-paid trip to meet a famous person known for their compassion (the Dalai Lama, Jane Goodall, and Gloria Steinem, respectively). The high level of participation in this student assignment, and its award program, led a BBC News article to call the assignment "the world's most compassionate 24 hours."

=== Action Teaching ===
In 2000, Plous coined the term "action teaching," which he presented as the pedagogical counterpart to action research—a term coined by Kurt Lewin in the aftermath of World War II. In the context of his own discipline, psychology, Plous says that action teaching can lead "not only to a better understanding of psychology but to a more just, compassionate and peaceful world."

Between 2005 and 2015, Social Psychology Network held an annual action teaching award competition that honored outstanding examples and posted them on the web for teachers to freely use or adapt. After a brief hiatus, the award program was succeeded in 2020 by the Society for the Psychological Study of Social Issues, which expanded the program to include grants as well as awards.

=== IACUCs ===
In 2001, Plous coauthored a study that evaluated the reliability of 50 randomly selected Institutional Animal Care and Use Committees (IACUCs). The study, funded by the National Science Foundation and published in the journal Science, found that the level of agreement between these committees, when it came to deciding whether to approve animal research proposals, was not significantly different from a coin toss. This lack of reliability was found even with proposals in which animals were subjected to electric shock, food or water deprivation, significant pain, or death.

=== Joe Chemo ===
After his father almost died of cancer, Plous developed an antismoking character he called Joe Chemo, intended to represent a more realistic view of smoking than the Joe Camel advertising character used by R. J. Reynolds. The first image of Joe Chemo ran in the 1996 winter issue of Adbusters magazine, and since that time, the character has appeared or been mentioned in the New York Times, Newsweek, Time, the Wall Street Journal, the Washington Post, and many other media outlets. In addition, the Washington State Department of Health distributed 10,000 Joe Chemo posters to public schools, the American Lung Association circulated a full-body Joe Chemo costume for use at antismoking events across the U.S., several cities displayed Joe Chemo billboards, and Plous launched an interactive JoeChemo.org website that received several million page views.

== Publications ==
=== Books ===
- Plous, S. (1993). The psychology of judgment and decision making. New York: McGraw-Hill. ISBN 978-0-07-050477-6 [Translated into Chinese, Korean, Norwegian, and Russian; hardbound edition concurrently published by Temple University Press.]
- Plous, S. (Ed.). (2003). Understanding prejudice and discrimination. New York: McGraw-Hill. ISBN 978-0-07-255443-4

=== Selected Journal Articles and Chapters ===
- Plous, S., Myers, D. G., Kite, M., & Dunn, D. S. (2021). Teaching social psychology effectively: A practical guide. In J. Zumbach, D. Bernstein, S. Narciss, and P. Marsico (Eds.), International Handbook of Psychology Learning and Teaching. Springer.
- Plous, S. (2017). Internationalizing psychology through massive open online courses. In G. Rich, U. P. Gielen, and H. Takooshian (Eds.), Internationalizing the Teaching of Psychology. IAP.
- Takooshian, H., Gielen, U. P., Plous, S., Rich, G. J., & Velayo, R. S. (2016). Internationalizing undergraduate psychology education: Trends, techniques, and technologies. American Psychologist, 71, 136-147.
- Plous, S. (2015). Grappling with student plagiarism. In R. J. Sternberg and S. T. Fiske, S. T. (Eds.), Ethical Challenges in the Behavioral and Brain Sciences: Case Studies and Commentaries (pp. 8–10). Cambridge University Press.
- Plous, S. (2012). Action teaching. In D. Christie (Ed.)., The Encyclopedia of Peace Psychology (pp. 1–5). Wiley-Blackwell.
- Plous, S., & Herzog, H. A., Jr. (2001). Reliability of protocol reviews for animal research. Science, 293, 608-609.
- Plous, S. (2000). Responding to overt displays of prejudice: A role-playing exercise. Teaching of Psychology, 27, 198-200.
- Plous, S., & Herzog, H. A., Jr. (1999, June). Should AWA coverage be broadened? Results from a survey of animal care and use committees. Lab Animal, pp. 38–40.
- Plous, S. (1998). Signs of change within the animal rights movement: Results from a follow-up survey of activists. Journal of Comparative Psychology, 112, 48-54.
- Plous, S., & Neptune, D. (1997). Racial and gender biases in magazine advertising: A content-analytic study. Psychology of Women Quarterly, 21, 627-644.
- Plous, S. (1996). Attitudes toward the use of animals in psychological research and education: Results from a national survey of psychologists. American Psychologist, 51, 1167-1180.
- Plous, S. (1996). Attitudes toward the use of animals in psychological research and education: Results from a national survey of psychology majors. Psychological Science, 7, 352-358.
- Plous, S. (1996). Ten myths about affirmative action. Journal of Social Issues, 52, 25-31.
- Plous, S., & Williams, T. (1995). Racial stereotypes from the days of American slavery: A continuing legacy. Journal of Applied Social Psychology, 25, 795-817.

== Honors and awards ==
Professor Plous is a Fellow of the Association for Psychological Science, the American Psychological Association, the Society for the Teaching of Psychology, the Society of Experimental Social Psychology, and the American Association for the Advancement of Science. Other honors and awards include:

Teaching and Mentoring:

- Charles L. Brewer Distinguished Teaching of Psychology Award (American Psychological Foundation)
- Connecticut Professor of the Year (Carnegie Foundation and Council for Advancement and Support of Education)
- Award for Outstanding Undergraduate Teaching and Mentoring (SPSSI)
- Binswanger Prize for Excellence in Teaching (Wesleyan University, 1998 and 2011)

Research and Writing:

- Gordon Allport Intergroup Relations Prize
- Otto Klineberg Intercultural and International Relations Award
- William James Book Award (for The Psychology of Judgment and Decision Making

Professional Service:

- Award for Service to the Field (Society for Personality and Social Psychology)
- Award for Distinguished Service to the Society (Society for Personality and Social Psychology)
- Society for General Psychology Presidential Citation (for founding Social Psychology Network)
