= Teaching of Psychology =

- Discipline: Education, Psychology
- Language: English
- Edited by: Aaron S. Richmond

Publication details
- History: 1974 -present
- Publisher: SAGE Publications
- Frequency: Quarterly
- Impact factor: 1.7 (2025)

Standard abbreviations
- ISO 4: Teach. Psychol.

Indexing
- ISSN: 0098-6283 (print); 1532-8023 (web)
- LCCN: 74648221
- OCLC no.: 629724544

Links
- Journal homepage; Online access; Online archive

Teaching of Psychology is a peer-reviewed academic journal focusing on the teaching of psychology. It has been in publication since 1974 and is currently published by SAGE Publications in association with the Society for the Teaching of Psychology: Division 2 of the American Psychological Association.

== Abstracting and indexing ==
Teaching of Psychology is abstracted and indexed in, among other databases: SCOPUS, and the Social Sciences Citation Index.
