= Joe Camel =

Cigarette mascot

- 1989 magazine ad
- First appearance: 1974 (Europe); 1988 (US)
- Last appearance: 1997; 29 years ago
- Created by: R. J. Reynolds Tobacco Company

Joe Camel (also called Old Joe) was an advertising mascot used by the R. J. Reynolds Tobacco Company (RJR) for their cigarette brand Camel. The character was created in 1974 for a French advertising campaign, and was redesigned for the American market in 1988. He appeared in magazine advertisements, clothing, and billboards among other print media and merchandise.

In 1991, the Journal of the American Medical Association (JAMA) published research indicating that the Joe Camel ad campaign was appealing to children. They found that Joe Camel and the Disney Channel logo were recognized equally among six-year-olds (over 90 percent recognition), high school students were more familiar with him than adults, and that Camel's market share among youth smokers had sharply risen. The research led RJR to a lawsuit in California, and a formal complaint from the Federal Trade Commission (FTC) for "unfair practices" by exposing children to smoking. RJR denied the accusations that they were marketing towards children, but voluntarily ended the campaign in 1997 after increased litigation and pressure from American federal agencies.

== Description ==
Joe Camel is an anthropomorphic camel who smokes cigarettes. He lacks many typical camelid traits such as a hump, hooves, or tail, appearing as a muscular humanoid with a camel's head. He is often outfitted in masculine wear like tuxedos, T-shirts, and hard hats, and is typically in a "heroic pose", surrounded by women or in a bar.

With television advertisements for cigarettes outlawed in the United States in 1970, 18 years before Joe Camel's American debut, the character was often seen on billboards, magazines, clothing, and other promotional displays. Early advertisements often depicted Joe alongside the motto "Smooth character." Camel brand owner, R. J. Reynolds (RJR), also ran promotions in which customers could redeem "Camel Cash" vouchers for Joe Camel gear including clothing, watches, mugs, lighters, and shower curtains. A card game was also released.

Some critics claimed that Joe's nose was drawn in a phallic fashion, as to suggest that smoking is a virile pursuit. This was dismissed by its designer.

== History ==
=== Background ===
Camel is the oldest cigarette brand in the United States. Camel cigarettes were first released by RJR in 1913 featuring a plain camel drawing, known as "Old Joe", on the package. The camel theme was chosen because the cigarettes used Turkish tobacco, and Americans associated the animal with exotic Asian countries. The original drawing was made by Belgian artist Fred Otto Kleesattel, who had based it on a dromedary named Old Joe in the traveling Barnum & Bailey Circus. For the next 60 years, RJR employed a series of marketing campaigns for the Camel brand; one notable campaign launched in 1946 maintained that doctors smoked Camels more than any other cigarette. Camel was the leading brand in the early 1950s, but had dropped to sixth place by 1985. Philip Morris had also eclipsed RJR's market share by 1985 (35.8 to 31.7%), due primarily to the success of Marlboro.

=== Character creation ===
The original Joe Camel design used in French advertising in the 1970s, before it was Americanized

The character Joe Camel was created in 1974 by British artist Nicholas Price for a French advertising campaign for Camel cigarettes. It was first published in Lui, an adult-entertainment magazine. The new Joe Camel character was subsequently used in advertising in other countries throughout the 1970s. This European iteration of Joe Camel was first seen in the United States in 1988 when Greensboro, North Carolina company Trone Advertising used the character in promotional materials created for the Camel brand's 75th anniversary.

The American version of Joe Camel was created later by art designer Mike Salisbury working on contract for the brand's main agency, McCann-Erickson New York. The intent of the campaign was to compete with Marlboro and its successful Marlboro Man campaign. Salisbury was contacted because of his film advertisements and retro style; McCann wanted his help to depict masculine heroes in old action films, like Humphrey Bogart and Gary Cooper, smoking Camels. Early advertisements were not successful because the audience was not familiar with films of that era, even after giving the characters camel heads. It was not until they gave the camel a look inspired by James Bond and James "Sonny" Crockett that they had a positive test response. Salisbury gave Joe expressive eyebrows like Sean Connery (Bond), and hair like Don Johnson (Sonny). The campaign promoted a "hip" lifestyle, which was typical advertising practice for the industry since the 1920s.

The success of the campaign made the character a key part of Camel's advertising. The New York Times wrote that Joe Camel was successful in changing the public's perception of a brand quickly, a typically difficult feat. They also wrote that the campaign helped protect Camel from the 5-8% annual decrease that full-price cigarette brand sales were feeling at the time as cheaper brands grew. Furthermore, the campaign had continued despite RJR changing advertisement agencies from McCann, to Young & Rubicam, and finally to Mezzina/Brown Inc.

=== JAMA studies and Mangini lawsuit ===
In December 1991, the Journal of the American Medical Association (JAMA) published a study in which young children were asked to match brand logos with products. The study showed that among children age six, 91.3% matched Joe Camel with cigarettes, nearly the same amount who matched the Disney Channel logo with Mickey Mouse. The researchers concluded that RJR (at the time operating as RJR Nabisco) was just as effective at reaching children as the Disney Channel. In the same JAMA volume, another study was published comparing how well Joe Camel was recognized among high school students versus adults over age 21. The study concluded that high school students were more likely to recognize Joe Camel (97.7% vs 72.2%), understand the product being advertised (97.5% vs. 67%), and identify the Camel brand (93.6% vs 57.7%). The study concluded that the Joe Camel campaign was far more successful at advertising to children than adults. The authors also wrote that Camel's share of smokers under 18 had risen from 0.5% to 32.8% during the campaign's three years at that point.

Among those who read the JAMA papers was San Francisco-based family law attorney Janet Mangini. In 1992, she sued RJR as a private citizen, challenging the company for targeting minors with the campaign. In her complaint, Mangini alleged that Camel sales to teenagers increased from $6 million to $476 million over the four years since the campaign began. RJR attempted to dismiss the lawsuit, saying that only the federal government could regulate its advertising, but a California state court reviewed the case, and in 1994 permitted Mangini to proceed with the lawsuit. RJR attempted to appeal to the United States Supreme Court to have the case thrown out, but their request was turned away.

The JAMA studies did have their critics. The Journal of Advertising published a study in September 1994 in which five university professors, who specialized in marketing and advertising, criticized the ethical standards of the studies. By evaluating the papers against academic research standards, the reviewers identified major flaws with regards to reliability and validity, and accused the DiFranza study of using pre-determined results. The designer of Joe Camel, Mike Salisbury, said there was never any intent to attract children. He explained that RJR rejected some designs on the grounds they would appeal too much to children, and that there was a conscious effort to make him look like a 30-year old.

=== Federal Trade Commission complaint ===
In response to the JAMA studies, the American Heart Association, American Lung Association, and American Cancer Society wrote a joint letter in 1991 to the Federal Trade Commission (FTC) asking them to force RJR to end the Joe Camel campaign. The FTC investigated the case for two years, but in 1994 decided not to act after three of five commissioners could not find sufficient evidence that RJR violated federal law. After President Bill Clinton appointed new FTC chairman, Robert Pitofsky, and member Christine Varney, the FTC announced in February 1997 they would re-examine the case.

On May 28, 1997, the FTC concluded that the Joe Camel campaign was targeted to youth and requested a court order to end the campaign. In the complaint, the FTC alleged that RJR was exploring ways to appeal to younger smokers and "first usual brand" smokers as early as 1984. They concluded that the health injuries to children from smoking were not "reasonably avoidable" given children's inability to understand the consequences of smoking. They concluded that the campaign violated federal law as an "unfair practice" under Section 5 of the Federal Trade Commission Act, which prohibits ‘‘unfair or deceptive acts or practices in or affecting commerce.’’

=== End of the campaign ===
By March 1997, Joe Camel was already absent from Camel advertisements as a temporary measure by RJR while federal litigation was in progress. RJR officially ended the Joe Camel campaign on July 10, 1997. The move came just weeks after the FTC complaint in May, and shortly after RJR and other tobacco companies agreed to pay a $368.5 billion settlement to states seeking to recover costs due to tobacco-related illnesses. Additionally, the tobacco industry and 40 state attorneys general had just settled on a ban on the use of cartoon figures in cigarette ads, though the settlement had yet to be ratified by Congress or seen support from President Clinton.

Joe Camel was phased out of point-of-purchase advertising, followed soon by billboards and print ads. The campaign closure increased interest in Joe Camel memorabilia. The campaign was replaced with the ''What you're looking for" campaign which used the original plain camel from the pack design. In September, RJR agreed to pay $10 million to San Francisco and the other California cities and counties who intervened in the Mangini litigation. The money was earmarked primarily to fund anti-smoking efforts targeted at youth.

== Legacy ==
The Joe Camel campaign has been suspected of inspiring similar ad campaigns. In late 1991, Brown & Williamson ran marketing tests for a revival of their penguin mascot, Willie, for their Kool cigarette brand. The character had originally appeared in Kool advertisements from 1933 to 1960. The New York Times noted that the campaign was likely influenced by Joe Camel. Anti-smoking groups criticized the test campaign. Also, anti-drinking groups accused Anheuser-Busch of similar practices in 2004 for their "Bud-weis-er" frogs, and groups fighting childhood obesity criticized Ronald McDonald and other characters for promoting unhealthy foods. Litigation proceedings used the precedence of Joe Camel to further their case. In 1996, Adbusters magazine published a subvertisement called "Joe Chemo", featuring a bedridden and dying Joe Camel. The parody was developed in collaboration with psychology professor Scott Plous, who initially proposed the concept. The character was shared in the advertisement trade magazine Adweek.

The success and effect of the Joe Camel campaign has been assessed by academics in retrospect. A paper in the International Journal of Advertising in 2010 found that campaign brought consumer attention to the brand and may have helped in the short term, but that the eventual negative publicity may have reinforced negative attitudes towards smoking. The authors noted that the Joe Camel campaign was not as successful as the Marlboro Man, and Newport had no comparable mascot or spokesperson, yet achieved a similar market share and as young a demographic as Camel.
