= Social Psychology Network =

American educational organization

The Social Psychology Network (SPN) is an educational organization with more than 1,500 members worldwide. SPN was founded by psychology professor Scott Plous as a website in 1996. Development of SPN was supported by several grants from the National Science Foundation. The website includes a large collection of social psychology links, a feed of related news, and discussion forums for students and professionals interested in social psychology.

Affiliated partner sites include the Society of Experimental Social Psychology (SESP.org); the Society for Personality and Social Psychology; and Research Randomizer (Randomizer.org, a web-based tool for random sampling and random assignment).
