= World Compassion Day =

Annual observance in November

World Compassion Day (WCD)
- Observed by: All
- Type: International
- Date: 28 November
- Next time: 28 November 2026
- Frequency: annual
- First time: 2012

World Compassion Day, often abbreviated to WCD, is an idea based on Ahimsa and Compassion. It is a day for global icons to share their ideologies, values and principles on how to make the Gandhian ideals of Ahimsa and Compassion relevant to our times.

India is the first nation to drive this initiative, given the fact that it has been the crucible of religions like Hinduism, Buddhism, Jainism and Sikhism - all committed to the ideals of compassion and ahimsa. WCD 2012 had a special focus on animal welfare and the growing importance of vegetarianism for reasons of both healthcare and to discourage killing of other species.

Speaking about World Compassion Day, The Dalai Lama says, “Today, more than ever before, life must be characterized by a sense of Universal responsibility, not only nation to nation and human to human but also human to other forms of life.”

Pritish Nandy says, “Eventually, WCD will be a global forum for inspiring and supporting change across social, political and environmental platforms to make the value of compassion actionable in our times. Unless we believe in ahimsa, we can’t make the world a better place for future generations.”

WCD is founded by Pritish Nandy and organised by Pritish Nandy Communications.

== WCD 2012 ==
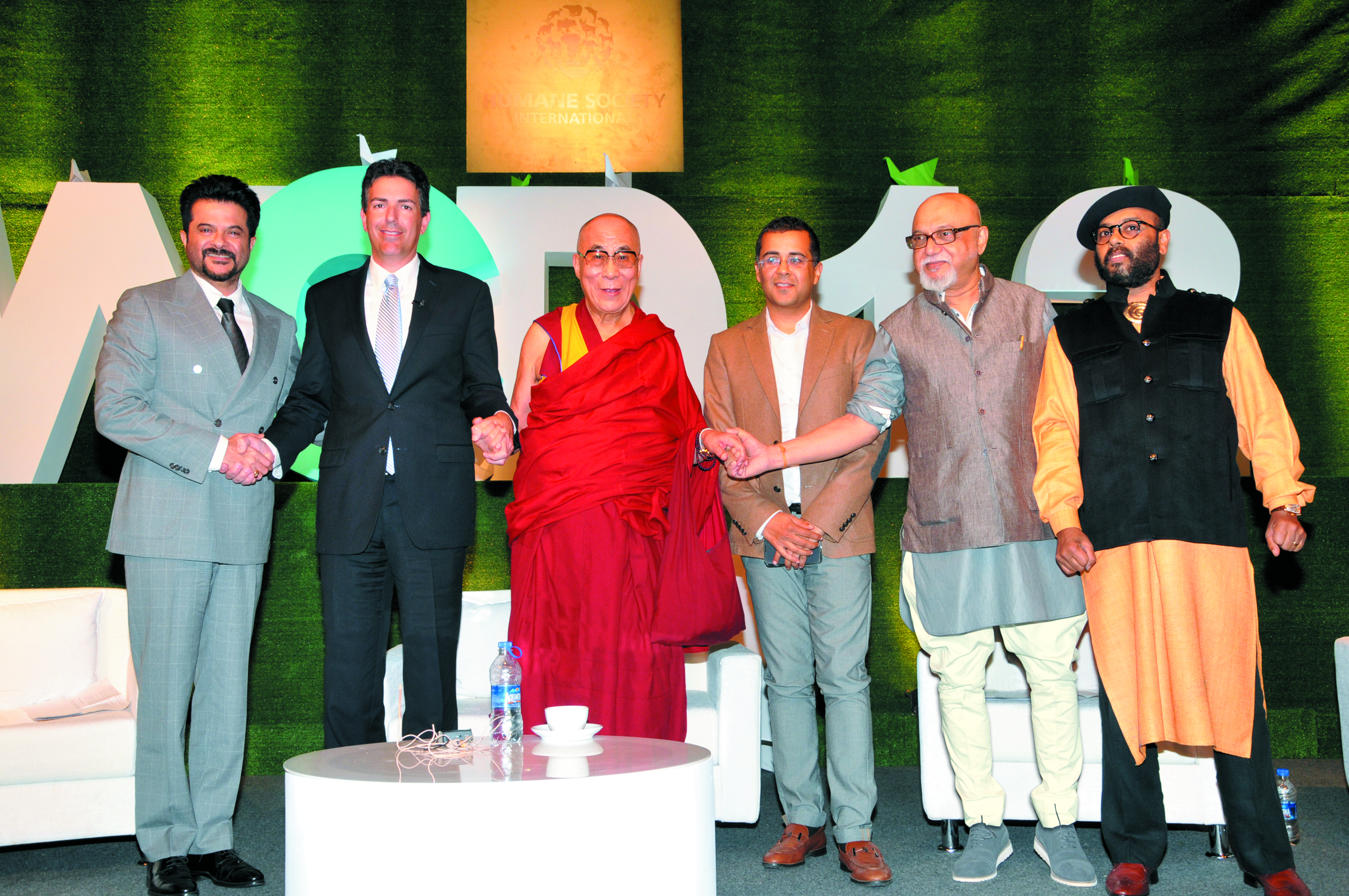
From left: Anil Kapoor, Wayne Pacelle, the Dalai Lama, Chetan Bhagat, Founder Pritish Nandy and Paresh Maity on the occasion of the 1st World Compassion Day 2012 in Mumbai

The first WCD was held in Mumbai, India in the presence of the 14th Dalai Lama on 28 November 2012. It focussed on the need for compassion towards animals and all living things on this planet. It brought to India, Humane Society International, an organisation that works in the area of animal welfare.

Additional speakers included Anil Kapoor (actor), Chetan Bhagat (writer), Wayne Pacelle (President, Humane Society of the United States), Andrew Rowan (CEO, Humane Society International) and Founder Pritish Nandy. Paresh Maity did a live water colour painting of the Dalai Lama to mark the day.
