= List of Felicity Jones performances =

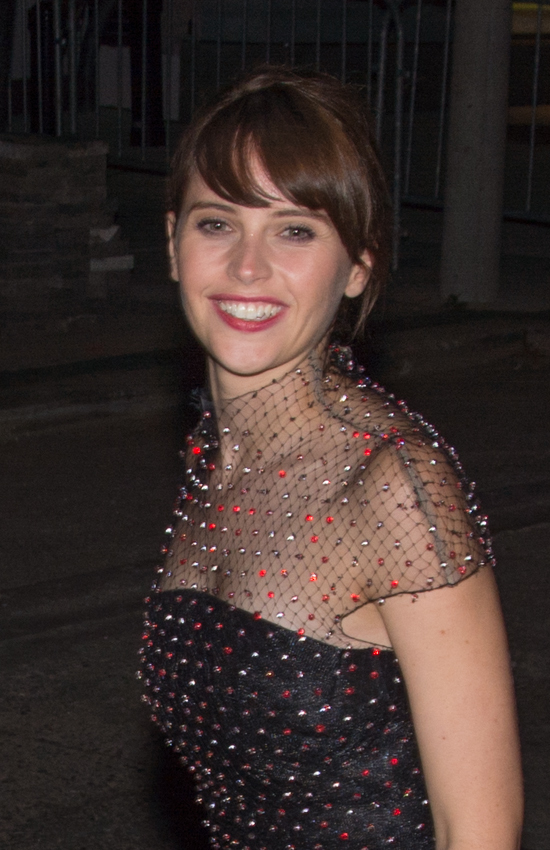
Jones at the 2014 Toronto International Film Festival

Felicity Jones is an English actress who made her debut at the age of 12 in the television film The Treasure Seekers (1996). She went on to play Ethel Hallow for one series of the television series The Worst Witch and its sequel Weirdsister College. On radio, she has played the role of Emma Grundy in the BBC's The Archers. In 2008, she appeared in the Donmar Warehouse production of The Chalk Garden. Her performance as Jane Hawking in the 2014 biographical film The Theory of Everything garnered critical acclaim, earning her nominations for the Golden Globe Award, Screen Actors Guild Award, BAFTA Award and Academy Award for Best Actress. In 2016, Jones starred as Jyn Erso in Rogue One: A Star Wars Story. That same year, she received the BAFTA Britannia Award for British Artist of the Year.

== Film ==
| Year | Title | Role | Notes | Ref. |
|---|---|---|---|---|
| 2008 | Flashbacks of a Fool | Young Ruth | | |
| 2008 | Brideshead Revisited | Cordelia Flyte | | |
| 2009 | Chéri | Edmée | | |
| 2010 | Cemetery Junction | Julie Kendrick | | |
| 2010 | Soulboy | Mandy Hodgson | | |
| 2010 | The Tempest | Miranda | | |
| 2011 | Chalet Girl | Kim Matthews | | |
| 2011 | Like Crazy | Anna Gardner | | |
| 2011 | Albatross | Beth Fischer | | |
| 2011 | Hysteria | Emily Dalrymple | | |
| 2012 | Cheerful Weather for the Wedding | Dolly Thatchem | | |
| 2013 | Breathe In | Sophie | | |
| 2013 | The Invisible Woman | Nelly Ternan | | |
| 2014 | The Amazing Spider-Man 2 | Felicia Hardy | | |
| 2014 | The Theory of Everything | Jane Wilde Hawking | | |
| 2015 | True Story | Jill Barker | | |
| 2016 | Collide | Juliette | | |
| 2016 | A Monster Calls | Mum | | |
| 2016 | Inferno | Sienna Brooks | | |
| 2016 | Rogue One: A Star Wars Story | Jyn Erso | | |
| 2018 | Leading Lady Parts | Herself | Short film | |
| 2018 | On the Basis of Sex | Ruth Bader Ginsburg | | |
| 2019 | The Aeronauts | Amelia Wren | | |
| 2020 | Dragon Rider | Sorrell | Voice role | |
| 2020 | The Midnight Sky | Iris Sullivan | | |
| 2021 | The Last Letter from Your Lover | Ellie Haworth | Also executive producer | |
| 2023 | Dead Shot | Catherine | Also executive producer | |
| 2024 | The Brutalist | Erzsébet Tóth | | |
| 2025 | Train Dreams | Gladys Grainer | | |
| 2025 | 100 Nights of Hero | Moon/the voice of Narrator | Also executive producer | |
| 2025 | Oh. What. Fun. | Channing Clauster | | |
| TBA | Eleven Missing Days | Agatha Christie | Filming | |
| TBA | The Thing That Hurts | | Post-production | |

== Television ==
| Year(s) | Title | Role | Notes | Ref. |
|---|---|---|---|---|
| 1996 | The Treasure Seekers | Alice Bastable | Television film | |
| 1998–1999 | The Worst Witch | Ethel Hallow | 11 episodes | |
| 2001 | Weirdsister College | Ethel Hallow | 13 episodes | |
| 2003 | Servants | Grace May | 6 episodes | |
| 2007 | Northanger Abbey | Catherine Morland | Television film | |
| 2007 | Cape Wrath | Zoe Brogan | 8 episodes | |
| 2008 | Doctor Who | Robina Redmond | Episode: "The Unicorn and the Wasp" | |
| 2009 | The Diary of Anne Frank | Margot Frank | 5 episodes | |
| 2011 | Page Eight | Julianne Worricker | Television film | |
| 2014 | Salting the Battlefield | Julianne Worricker | Television film | |
| 2014 | Girls | Dottie | Episode: "Role-Play" | |
| 2017 | Saturday Night Live | Host | Episode: "Felicity Jones/Sturgill Simpson" | |
| 2017 | Star Wars Forces of Destiny | Jyn Erso | Voice role; 2 episodes | |

== Theatre ==
| Year(s) | Production | Theatre | Role | Ref. |
|---|---|---|---|---|
| 2005–06 | The Snow Queen | Creation Theatre, Oxford | Gerda | |
| 2007 | That Face | Royal Court Theatre | Mia | |
| 2008 | The Chalk Garden | Donmar Warehouse | Laurel | |
| 2011 | Luise Miller | Donmar Warehouse | Luise Miller | |

== Radio ==
| Year(s) | Title | Role | Notes | Ref. |
|---|---|---|---|---|
| 1999–2009 | The Archers | Emma Grundy (née Carter) | | |
| 2003 | Mansfield Park | Fanny Price | | |
| 2004 | Falco: The Silver Pigs | Sosia | | |
