= List of awards and nominations received by Felicity Jones =

Felicity Jones awards and nominations
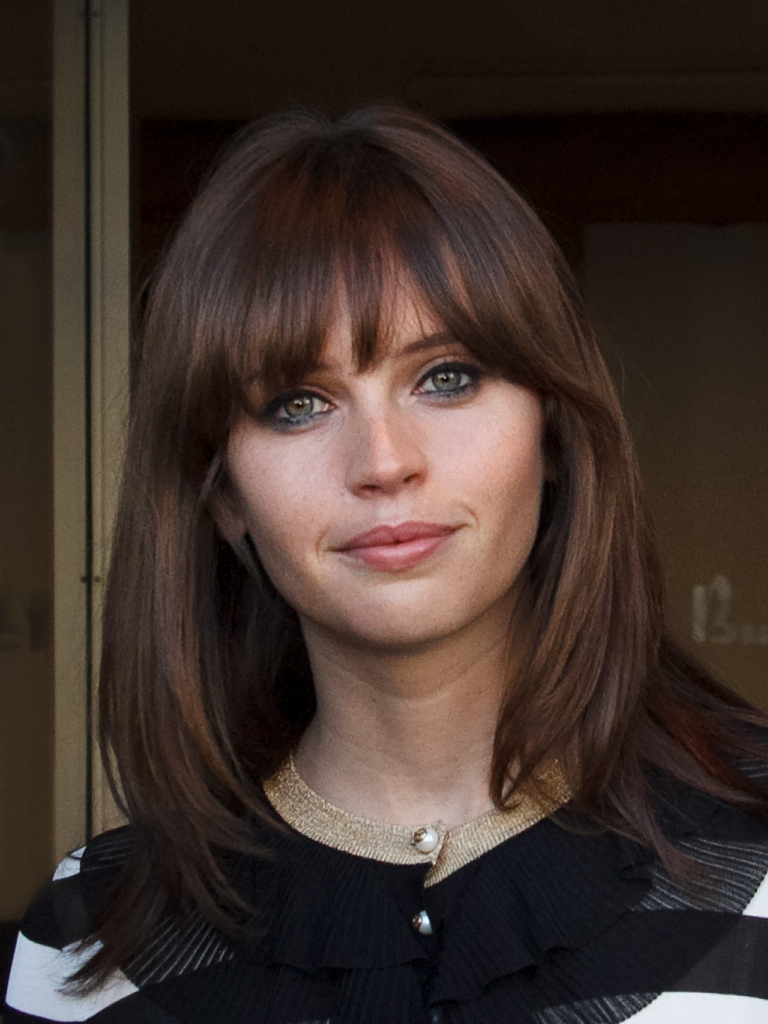
- Jones at the 2016 Toronto International Film Festival
Awards and nominations
Award	Wins	Nominations
Academy Awards	0	2
Actor Awards	0	2
BAFTA Awards	1	3
Critics' Choice Awards	0	1
Golden Globes	0	2

Totals (Note: Certain award groups do not simply award one winner. They acknowledge several different recipients, have runners-up, and have third place. Since this is a specific recognition and is different from losing an award, runner-up mentions are considered wins in this award tally. For simplification and to avoid errors, each award in this list has been presumed to have had a prior nomination.)
- Wins: 11
- Nominations: 48

The following is a list of awards and nominations received by English actress Felicity Jones.

== Major associations ==
=== Academy Awards ===
Year	Category	Nominated work	Result	Ref.
2015	Best Actress	The Theory of Everything	Nominated	
2025	Best Supporting Actress	The Brutalist	Nominated	

=== Actor Awards ===
Year	Category	Nominated work	Result	Ref.
2015	Outstanding Cast in a Motion Picture	The Theory of Everything	Nominated	
2015	Outstanding Female Actor in a Leading Role	The Theory of Everything	Nominated	

=== BAFTA Awards ===
Year	Category	Nominated work	Result	Ref.
British Academy Film Awards
2015	Best Actress in a Leading Role	The Theory of Everything	Nominated	
2025	Best Actress in a Supporting Role	The Brutalist	Nominated	
British Academy Britannia Awards
2016	British Artist of the Year	—N/a	Won	

=== Critics' Choice Awards ===
Year	Category	Nominated work	Result	Ref.
Film
2015	Best Actress	The Theory of Everything	Nominated	

=== Golden Globe Awards ===
Year	Category	Nominated work	Result	Ref.
2015	Best Actress in a Motion Picture – Drama	The Theory of Everything	Nominated	
2025	Best Supporting Actress – Motion Picture	The Brutalist	Nominated	

== Other awards ==
=== British Independent Film Awards ===
Year	Category	Nominated work	Result	Ref.
2011	Best Supporting Actress	Albatross	Nominated	
2013	Best Actress	The Invisible Woman	Nominated	
2018	Variety Award	—N/a	Honored	

=== Gotham Awards ===
Year	Category	Nominated work	Result	Ref.
2011	Breakthrough Performer	Like Crazy	Won	

=== MTV Movie & TV Awards ===
Year	Category	Nominated work	Result	Ref.
2017	Best Hero	Rogue One: A Star Wars Story	Nominated	

=== National Board of Review ===
Year	Category	Nominated work	Result	Ref.
2011	Breakthrough Performance	Like Crazy	Won (Note: Tied with Rooney Mara for The Girl with the Dragon Tattoo)	

=== Satellite Awards ===
Year	Category	Nominated work	Result	Ref.
2015	Best Actress	The Theory of Everything	Nominated	
2025	Best Actress in a Supporting Role	The Brutalist	Nominated	

== Other associations ==
Award	Year	Category	Work	Result	Ref.
AACTA International Awards	2015	Best Actress	The Theory of Everything	Nominated	
AACTA International Awards	2025	Best Supporting Actress	The Brutalist	Nominated	
Austin Film Critics Association	2025	Best Supporting Actress	The Brutalist	Nominated	
Dallas–Fort Worth Film Critics Association	2014	Best Actress	The Theory of Everything	4th place	
Detroit Film Critics Society	2011	Best Actress	Like Crazy	Nominated	
Detroit Film Critics Society	2011	Breakthrough Performance	Like Crazy	Nominated	
Detroit Film Critics Society	2016	Best Supporting Actress	A Monster Calls	Nominated	
Empire Awards	2012	Best Female Newcomer	Like Crazy	Won	
Empire Awards	2015	Best Actress	The Theory of Everything	Nominated	
Empire Awards	2017	Best Actress	Rogue One: A Star Wars Story	Won	
Georgia Film Critics Association	2015	Best Actress	The Theory of Everything	Nominated	
Hollywood Film Awards	2011	New Hollywood Award	—N/a	Won	
Houston Film Critics Society	2015	Best Actress	The Theory of Everything	Nominated	
Houston Film Critics Society	2025	Best Supporting Actress	The Brutalist	Nominated	
Jupiter Awards	2015	Best International Actress	The Theory of Everything	Nominated	
Jupiter Awards	2017	Best International Actress	Inferno	Nominated	
Kids' Choice Awards	2017	Favorite Movie Actress	Rogue One: A Star Wars Story	Nominated	
Kids' Choice Awards	2017	Favorite Butt-Kicker	Rogue One: A Star Wars Story	Nominated	
Kids' Choice Awards	2017	#Squad (shared with cast)	Rogue One: A Star Wars Story	Nominated	
London Film Critics' Circle	2015	British Actress of the Year	The Theory of Everything	Nominated	
San Diego Film Critics Society	2014	Best Actress	The Theory of Everything	Nominated	
Santa Barbara International Film Festival	2015	Cinema Vanguard Award (Note: Shared with Eddie Redmayne)	The Theory of Everything	Won	
Saturn Awards	2017	Best Actress	Rogue One: A Star Wars Story	Nominated	
St. Louis Film Critics Association	2014	Best Actress	The Theory of Everything	Nominated	
Sundance Film Festival	2011	Special Jury Prize	Like Crazy	Won	
Teen Choice Awards	2015	Choice Movie Actress: Drama	The Theory of Everything	Nominated	
Teen Choice Awards	2015	Choice Movie Actress: Drama	True Story	Nominated	
Teen Choice Awards	2017	Choice Sci-Fi Movie Actress	Rogue One: A Star Wars Story	Nominated	
Washington D.C. Area Film Critics Association	2014	Best Actress	The Theory of Everything	Nominated	
Women Film Critics Circle	2011	Best Screen Couple	Like Crazy	Nominated (Note: Shared with Anton Yelchin)	
Women Film Critics Circle	2014	Invisible Woman Award	The Theory of Everything	Won	
Women Film Critics Circle	2025	Best Supporting Actress	The Brutalist	2nd place	
