= List of accolades received by The Theory of Everything =

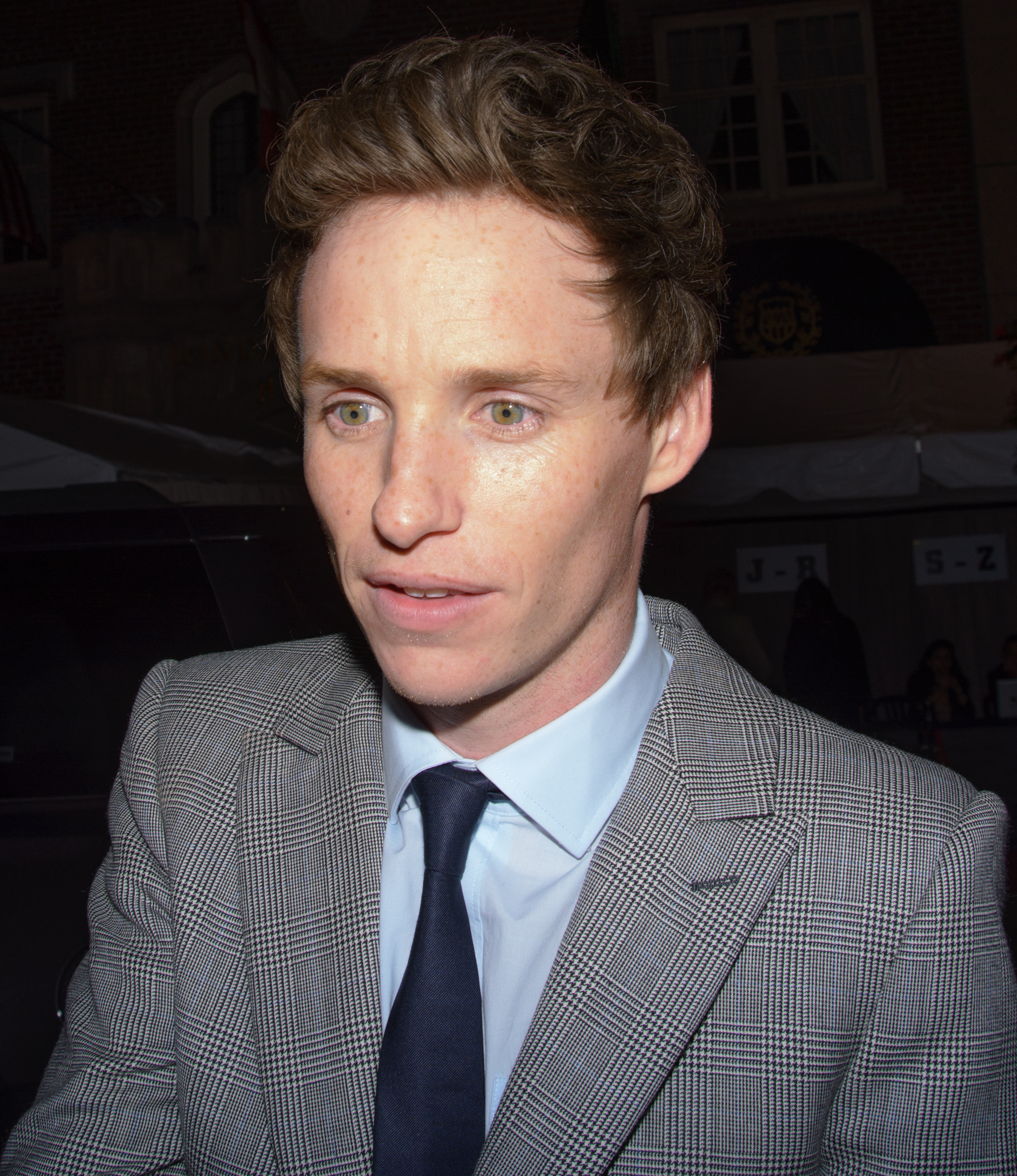
- Eddie Redmayne received several awards and nominations for his portrayal of Stephen Hawking.
Awards & nominations
| Award | Won | Nominated |
| AACTA Awards | 0 | 2 |
| Academy Award | 1 | 5 |
| African-American Film Critics Association | 1 | 1 |
| Alliance of Women Film Journalists | 0 | 1 |
| Art Directors Guild | 0 | 1 |
| British Academy Film Awards | 3 | 10 |
| Casting Society of America | 0 | 1 |
| Chicago Film Critics Association | 0 | 1 |
| Costume Designers Guild | 0 | 1 |
| Critics' Choice Movie Award | 0 | 5 |
| Dallas–Fort Worth Film Critics Association | 0 | 3 |
| Detroit Film Critics Society | 0 | 1 |
| Dorian Awards | 1 | 1 |
| Empire Awards | 0 | 3 |
| Florida Film Critics Circle | 0 | 2 |
| Golden Globe Award | 2 | 4 |
| Grammy Awards | 0 | 1 |
| Hollywood Film Awards | 1 | 1 |
| Houston Film Critics Society | 0 | 3 |
| International Film Music Critics Association | 0 | 1 |
| London Film Critics' Circle | 0 | 5 |
| Mill Valley Film Festival | 1 | 1 |
| MPSE Golden Reel Awards | 0 | 1 |
| MTV Movie Awards | 0 | 1 |
| New York Film Critics Online | 2 | 2 |
| Palm Springs International Film Festival | 1 | 1 |
| Producers Guild of America Award | 0 | 1 |
| San Diego Film Critics Society | 0 | 5 |
| San Francisco Film Critics Circle | 0 | 1 |
| Santa Barbara International Film Festival | 1 | 1 |
| Satellite Awards | 0 | 5 |
| Saturn Awards | 1 | 1 |
| Screen Actors Guild Awards | 1 | 3 |
| St. Louis Gateway Film Critics Association | 0 | 3 |
| Tallinn Black Nights Film Festival | 1 | 2 |
| Teen Choice Awards | 0 | 3 |
| USC Scripter Award | 0 | 1 |
| Washington D.C. Area Film Critics | 0 | 4 |
| Women Film Critics Circle | 2 | 2 |
- Total number of wins and nominations
| Totals | 19 | 91 |
- References

See The Theory of Everything (2006 film) for accolades received by the 2006 film.

The Theory of Everything is a 2014 British biographical romantic drama film directed by James Marsh. Anthony McCarten adapted the screenplay from the memoir Travelling to Infinity: My Life with Stephen by Jane Wilde Hawking. The film focuses on Jane's relationship with theoretical physicist Stephen Hawking, his motor neuron disease diagnosis and his career in physics. Actors Felicity Jones and Eddie Redmayne portray the main characters. The Theory of Everything had its world premiere at the 2014 Toronto International Film Festival. It was released in the United Kingdom by Universal Pictures on 1 January 2015. As of February 2015, the film has earned over £50 million in its combined total gross at the box office.

The film gathered various awards and nominations following its release, ranging from recognition of the film itself to Redmayne and Jones' acting performances, McCarten's screenplay and Jóhann Jóhannsson's score. The Theory of Everything earned ten nominations from the 68th British Academy Film Awards, and won three. Redmayne was named Best Actor at the 87th Academy Awards, where the film garnered five nominations. He and Jones received nominations for Best Actor and Actress at the AACTA Awards. Redmayne was also nominated for Best Actor by the Alliance of Women Film Journalists. The film's production designer John Paul Kelly was nominated for an Art Directors Guild Award, while casting director Nina Gold received a nomination for Best Casting in a Studio or Independent Drama from the Casting Society of America and costume designer Steven Noble was nominated for Excellence in Period Film by the Costume Designers Guild. The film gathered five nominations from the Critics' Choice Movie Awards, including Best Picture and Best Screenplay.

At the 72nd Golden Globe Awards, Redmayne won the Best Actor in a Motion Picture Drama accolade and composer Jóhann Jóhannsson won Best Original Score. Redmayne was named Breakout Performance Actor at the 18th Hollywood Film Awards, Best Actor by the New York Film Critics Online and he was awarded the Desert Palm Achievement Award at the Palm Springs International Film Festival. The Motion Picture Sound Editors nominated Glenn Freemantle, Gillian Dodders and Paul Wrightson for Best Dialogue and ADR in a Feature Film. The film's producers Tim Bevan, Eric Fellner, Lisa Bruce and McCarten garnered a nomination for Best Theatrical Motion Picture from the Producers Guild of America. The Theory of Everything has five nominations from the 19th Satellite Awards, while the cast is nominated for Outstanding Performance by a Cast in a Motion Picture at the Screen Actors Guild Awards. The film's screenplay is nominated for the USC Scripter Award, while the Women Film Critics Circle named Redmayne Best Actor and gave Jones The Invisible Woman Award.

== Awards and nominations ==
| Award | Date of ceremony | Category | Recipients | Result | Ref. |
|---|---|---|---|---|---|
| AACTA International Awards | 31 January 2015 | Best Actor | Eddie Redmayne | Nominated | |
| AACTA International Awards | 31 January 2015 | Best Actress | Felicity Jones | Nominated | |
| Academy Award | 22 February 2015 | Best Picture | Tim Bevan, Eric Fellner, Lisa Bruce, Anthony McCarten | Nominated | |
| Academy Award | 22 February 2015 | Best Actor | Eddie Redmayne | Won | |
| Academy Award | 22 February 2015 | Best Actress | Felicity Jones | Nominated | |
| Academy Award | 22 February 2015 | Best Adapted Screenplay | Anthony McCarten | Nominated | |
| Academy Award | 22 February 2015 | Best Original Score | Jóhann Jóhannsson | Nominated | |
| African-American Film Critics Association | 8 December 2014 | Top 10 Films | The Theory of Everything | Won | |
| Alliance of Women Film Journalists | 12 January 2015 | Best Actor | Eddie Redmayne | Nominated | |
| Art Directors Guild | 31 January 2015 | Excellence in Production Design for a Period Film | John Paul Kelly | Nominated | |
| British Academy Film Awards | 8 February 2015 | Best Actor in a Leading Role | Eddie Redmayne | Won | |
| British Academy Film Awards | 8 February 2015 | Best Actress in a Leading Role | Felicity Jones | Nominated | |
| British Academy Film Awards | 8 February 2015 | Best Adapted Screenplay | Anthony McCarten | Won | |
| British Academy Film Awards | 8 February 2015 | Best British Film | The Theory of Everything | Won | |
| British Academy Film Awards | 8 February 2015 | Best Costume Design | Steven Noble | Nominated | |
| British Academy Film Awards | 8 February 2015 | Best Film | The Theory of Everything | Nominated | |
| British Academy Film Awards | 8 February 2015 | Best Direction | James Marsh | Nominated | |
| British Academy Film Awards | 8 February 2015 | Best Film Music | Jóhann Jóhannsson | Nominated | |
| British Academy Film Awards | 8 February 2015 | Best Editing | Jinx Godfrey | Nominated | |
| British Academy Film Awards | 8 February 2015 | Best Make-up & Hair | Jan Sewell | Nominated | |
| Casting Society of America | 22 January 2015 | Studio or Independent Drama | Nina Gold | Nominated | |
| Chicago Film Critics Association | 15 December 2014 | Best Actor | Eddie Redmayne | Nominated | |
| Costume Designers Guild | 17 February 2015 | Excellence in Period Film | Steven Noble | Nominated | |
| Critics' Choice Movie Award | 15 January 2015 | Best Actor | Eddie Redmayne | Nominated | |
| Critics' Choice Movie Award | 15 January 2015 | Best Actress | Felicity Jones | Nominated | |
| Critics' Choice Movie Award | 15 January 2015 | Best Picture | The Theory of Everything | Nominated | |
| Critics' Choice Movie Award | 15 January 2015 | Best Score | Jóhann Jóhannsson | Nominated | |
| Critics' Choice Movie Award | 15 January 2015 | Best Screenplay | Anthony McCarten | Nominated | |
| Dallas–Fort Worth Film Critics Association | 15 December 2014 | Best Actor | Eddie Redmayne | Nominated | |
| Dallas–Fort Worth Film Critics Association | 15 December 2014 | Best Actress | Felicity Jones | Nominated | |
| Dallas–Fort Worth Film Critics Association | 15 December 2014 | Best Film | The Theory of Everything | Nominated | |
| Detroit Film Critics Society | 15 December 2014 | Best Actor | Eddie Redmayne | Nominated | |
| Dorian Awards | 20 January 2015 | Film Performance of the Year by an Actor | Eddie Redmayne | Won | |
| Empire Awards | 29 March 2015 | Best Actor | Eddie Redmayne | Nominated | |
| Empire Awards | 29 March 2015 | Best Actress | Felicity Jones | Nominated | |
| Empire Awards | 29 March 2015 | Best British Film | The Theory of Everything | Nominated | |
| Florida Film Critics Circle | 19 December 2014 | Best Actor | Eddie Redmayne | Nominated | |
| Florida Film Critics Circle | 19 December 2014 | Best Adapted Screenplay | Anthony McCarten | Nominated | |
| Golden Eagle Award | January 29, 2016 | Best Foreign Language Film | The Theory of Everything | Nominated | |
| Golden Globe Award | 11 January 2015 | Best Actor in a Motion Picture Drama | Eddie Redmayne | Won | |
| Golden Globe Award | 11 January 2015 | Best Actress in a Motion Picture Drama | Felicity Jones | Nominated | |
| Golden Globe Award | 11 January 2015 | Best Drama Motion Picture | Tim Bevan, Eric Fellner, Lisa Bruce, Anthony McCarten | Nominated | |
| Golden Globe Award | 11 January 2015 | Best Original Score | Jóhann Jóhannsson | Won | |
| Grammy Awards | 15 February 2016 | Best Score Soundtrack for Visual Media | Jóhann Jóhannsson | Nominated | |
| Hollywood Film Awards | 14 November 2014 | Hollywood Breakout Performance Actor | Eddie Redmayne | Won | |
| Houston Film Critics Society | 10 January 2015 | Best Actor | Eddie Redmayne | Nominated | |
| Houston Film Critics Society | 10 January 2015 | Best Actress | Felicity Jones | Nominated | |
| Houston Film Critics Society | 10 January 2015 | Best Original Score | Jóhann Jóhannsson | Nominated | |
| International Film Music Critics Association | 19 February 2015 | Best Original Score for a Drama | Jóhann Jóhannsson | Nominated | |
| London Film Critics' Circle | 18 January 2015 | Actor of the Year | Eddie Redmayne | Nominated | |
| London Film Critics' Circle | 18 January 2015 | British Actor of the Year | Eddie Redmayne | Nominated | |
| London Film Critics' Circle | 18 January 2015 | British Actress of the Year | Felicity Jones | Nominated | |
| London Film Critics' Circle | 18 January 2015 | British Film of the Year | The Theory of Everything | Nominated | |
| London Film Critics' Circle | 18 January 2015 | Film of the Year | The Theory of Everything | Nominated | |
| Mill Valley Film Festival | 12 October 2014 | World Cinema Gold Award | The Theory of Everything | Won | |
| MPSE Golden Reel Awards | 15 February 2015 | Best Dialogue and ADR in a Feature Film | Glenn Freemantle, Gillian Dodders, Paul Wrightson | Nominated | |
| MTV Movie Awards | 12 April 2015 | Best On-Screen Transformation | Eddie Redmayne | Nominated | |
| New York Film Critics Online | 7 December 2014 | Best Actor | Eddie Redmayne | Won | |
| New York Film Critics Online | 7 December 2014 | Top Ten Pictures | The Theory of Everything | Won | |
| Palm Springs International Film Festival | 3 January 2015 | Desert Palm Achievement Award | Eddie Redmayne | Won | |
| Producers Guild of America Award | 24 January 2015 | Best Theatrical Motion Picture | Tim Bevan, Eric Fellner, Lisa Bruce, Anthony McCarten | Nominated | |
| San Diego Film Critics Society | 15 December 2014 | Best Actor | Eddie Redmayne | Nominated | |
| San Diego Film Critics Society | 15 December 2014 | Best Actress | Felicity Jones | Nominated | |
| San Diego Film Critics Society | 15 December 2014 | Best Adapted Screenplay | Anthony McCarten | Nominated | |
| San Diego Film Critics Society | 15 December 2014 | Best Film | The Theory of Everything | Nominated | |
| San Diego Film Critics Society | 15 December 2014 | Best Production Design | John Paul Kelly | Nominated | |
| San Francisco Film Critics Circle | 14 December 2014 | Best Actor | Eddie Redmayne | Nominated | |
| Santa Barbara International Film Festival | 29 January 2015 | Cinema Vanguard Award | Eddie Redmayne and Felicity Jones | Won | |
| Satellite Awards | 15 February 2015 | Best Actor | Eddie Redmayne | Nominated | |
| Satellite Awards | 15 February 2015 | Best Actress | Felicity Jones | Nominated | |
| Satellite Awards | 15 February 2015 | Best Cinematography | Benoît Delhomme | Nominated | |
| Satellite Awards | 15 February 2015 | Best Film | The Theory of Everything | Nominated | |
| Satellite Awards | 15 February 2015 | Best Adapted Screenplay | Anthony McCarten | Nominated | |
| Saturn Awards | 25 June 2015 | Best International Film | The Theory of Everything | Won | |
| Screen Actors Guild Awards | 25 January 2015 | Outstanding Performance by a Cast in a Motion Picture | Charlie Cox, Felicity Jones, Simon McBurney, Eddie Redmayne, David Thewlis, Emily Watson | Nominated | |
| Screen Actors Guild Awards | 25 January 2015 | Outstanding Performance by a Female Actor | Felicity Jones | Nominated | |
| Screen Actors Guild Awards | 25 January 2015 | Outstanding Performance by a Male Actor | Eddie Redmayne | Won | |
| St. Louis Gateway Film Critics Association | 15 December 2014 | Best Actor | Eddie Redmayne | Nominated | |
| St. Louis Gateway Film Critics Association | 15 December 2014 | Best Actress | Felicity Jones | Nominated | |
| St. Louis Gateway Film Critics Association | 15 December 2014 | Best Adapted Screenplay | Anthony McCarten | Nominated | |
| Tallinn Black Nights Film Festival | 14–30 November 2014 | Best Actor | Eddie Redmayne | Won | |
| Tallinn Black Nights Film Festival | 14–30 November 2014 | Grand Prize | James Marsh | Nominated | |
| Teen Choice Awards | 16 August 2015 | Choice Drama Movie | The Theory of Everything | Nominated | |
| Teen Choice Awards | 16 August 2015 | Choice Movie Drama Actor | Eddie Redmayne | Nominated | |
| Teen Choice Awards | 16 August 2015 | Choice Movie Drama Actress | Felicity Jones | Nominated | |
| USC Scripter Award | 31 January 2015 | Best Adapted Screenplay | Jane Wilde Hawking and Anthony McCarten | Nominated | |
| Washington D.C. Area Film Critics Association | 8 December 2014 | Best Actor | Eddie Redmayne | Nominated | |
| Washington D.C. Area Film Critics Association | 8 December 2014 | Best Actress | Felicity Jones | Nominated | |
| Washington D.C. Area Film Critics Association | 8 December 2014 | Best Adapted Screenplay | Anthony McCarten | Nominated | |
| Washington D.C. Area Film Critics Association | 8 December 2014 | Best Original Score | Jóhann Jóhannsson | Nominated | |
| Women Film Critics Circle | 16 December 2014 | Best Actor | Eddie Redmayne | Won | |
| Women Film Critics Circle | 16 December 2014 | The Invisible Woman Award | Felicity Jones | Won | |
