= Jyn Erso =

Character in the Star Wars universe

- Star Wars character
- Felicity Jones as Jyn Erso in Rogue One
- First appearance: Catalyst (2016)
- Created by: John Knoll
- Portrayed by: Felicity Jones; Other: Beau Gadsdon (8-year-old); Dolly Gadsdon (4-year-old)
- Voiced by: Felicity Jones (Star Wars Forces of Destiny, season 1; archive audio on Rebels); Helen Sadler (Star Wars Battlefront (2015) and Star Wars Forces of Destiny, season 2)

In-universe information
- Alias: Liana Hallik; Tanith Pontha; Kestrel Dawn
- Nickname: "Stardust" (by her father)
- Species: Human
- Gender: Female
- Occupation: Soldier
- Affiliation: Rebel Alliance
- Family: Galen Erso (father, deceased); Lyra Erso (mother, deceased); Saw Gerrera (surrogate father, deceased)
- Homeworld: Vallt

Jyn Erso is a fictional character in the Star Wars franchise, portrayed by English actress Felicity Jones as the main protagonist in the 2016 film Rogue One: A Star Wars Story. Jyn aids the Rebel Alliance in a desperate attempt to steal the plans to the Death Star, a weapon of the Galactic Empire with enough power to destroy an entire planet. The character was introduced as a child in the 2016 prequel novel Catalyst by James Luceno, and would later appear in the 2017 novel Star Wars: Rebel Rising by Beth Revis, once again as the protagonist, detailing her time as a teenager and induction into her family friend and mentor Saw Gerrera's Partisan offshoot-sect of the Rebel Alliance, as well as her independent efforts in both combating and evading the forces of the Empire.

== Character ==
=== Origins ===
Industrial Light & Magic chief creative officer John Knoll, credited for the story of Rogue One, told Vanity Fair in 2016 that he conceived the plot of the film while working as a visual effects supervisor on the 2005 film Star Wars: Episode III – Revenge of the Sith. Hearing about the development of a live-action Star Wars television series, he conceived a story, inspired by a plot point mentioned in the opening crawl of the original 1977 film Star Wars, which would eventually become Rogue One. Knoll envisioned Jyn as a female protagonist who could be an inspiration for his daughters.

=== Portrayal ===
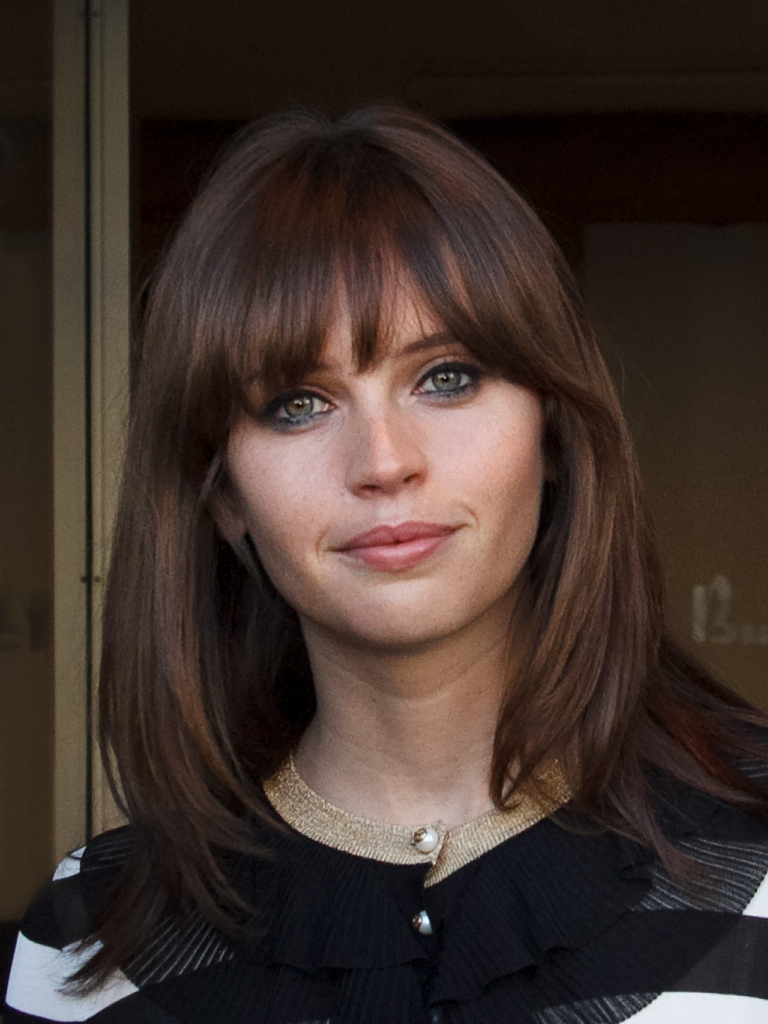
English actress Felicity Jones portrays Jyn Erso in Rogue One.

In January 2015, The Hollywood Reporter stated that numerous actresses, including Tatiana Maslany, Rooney Mara, and Felicity Jones were being tested for the lead role in Rogue One, the first stand-alone Star Wars film. In February 2015, it was reported that Jones was in final talks to star in the film, and her official casting was announced on March 12, 2015.

=== Description ===
Jyn is the daughter of Galen Erso, a scientist forced by the Empire to develop their Death Star superweapon. Young Jyn escapes when Galen is captured and his wife Lyra is killed by Imperial forces. She grows up under the watch of "extremist militant" Saw Gerrera, who also mentors and trains her in military combat. IGN's Eric Goldman wrote that she has "put up a brash, stern wall to protect herself, thanks to a traumatic childhood". Chris Barsanti of PopMatters added that Jyn's childhood tragedy leaves her "just cynical and bereft enough to make her hold out a respectable length of time before agreeing to assist the Rebel Alliance". Writing for Vanity Fair, Hilary Busis suggested that with Jyn's backstory, the film was drawing on "the Star Wars franchise's greatest natural resource: daddy issues".

The Daily Telegraph described Jyn as "a roguish, Han Solo-style heroine", and Todd McCarthy of The Hollywood Reporter called the character "a female warrior driven by destiny to take on the mightiest power in the galaxy". Chris Nashawaty of Entertainment Weekly described Jyn as a "fierce fighter" and "rallying leader". A. O. Scott wrote in The New York Times that in Rogue One, "Jyn's idealistic Jedi-ish tendencies are at first checked by a hint of Bogart-esque cynicism. She's suspicious of the rebels and contemptuous of the Empire, and has complicated feelings about Saw Gerrera". Peter Travers of Rolling Stone called Jyn "a born rebel", and Richard Brody of The New Yorker noted that "though Jyn had never exhibited any spirit of revolt", coming together with Gerrera and the rebels results in "Jyn's transition from an apolitical survivor to an active rebel".

== Appearances ==
=== Novels ===
Jyn is introduced as a child in the prequel novel Catalyst: A Rogue One Novel by James Luceno, published in November 2016. In the novel, Republic Lieutenant Commander Orson Krennic saves his old friend Galen Erso and his family from a coup, and enlists the scientist to develop energy technology using kyber crystals that would ostensibly be applied to altruistic purposes. The research is actually necessary for the successful construction of Emperor Palpatine's secret superweapon, the Death Star. Galen and his wife Lyra begin to suspect Krennic's ulterior motives, and plot to free themselves and their daughter Jyn from his grasp.

Jyn appears as the main character in the novel Rebel Rising by Beth Revis. This novel takes place between the prologue and main narrative of Rogue One. She also appears in the novelization of Rogue One by Alexander Freed. Saw Gerrera appears with an eleven-year-old Jyn Erso in the novelization of the film Solo: A Star Wars Story.

=== Film ===
==== Rogue One ====
Rogue One was released in December 2016, with Felicity Jones in the role of Jyn. In the film, scientist Galen Erso (Mads Mikkelsen) is pressed into the service of the Empire against his will. When he is captured and his wife Lyra (Valene Kane) is killed, their young daughter Jyn escapes and hides in the bunker. She is later rescued by a Rebel extremist named Saw Gerrera (Forest Whitaker) who cared for her after Galen's capture.

Fifteen years later, (Note: When asked about her father, Jyn says she hasn't seen him in fifteen years.) Jyn is being held in Imperial custody on several criminal charges. The Rebel Alliance frees her upon intercepting a prisoner transport on the planet Wobani. They seek her help in contacting Saw Gerrera and persuading him to turn over information he has received about a powerful new weapon being developed by the Empire. Accompanied by Rebel intelligence operative Cassian Andor (Diego Luna) and the reprogrammed Imperial enforcer droid K-2SO (Alan Tudyk), Jyn travels to the desert moon Jedha and reconnects with Saw, who shows her a holographic message that Galen recorded for her. Galen explains that he had secretly built into the Imperial superweapon, called the Death Star, a fatal flaw that can be exploited to destroy it. Jyn and her comrades, joined by the defecting Imperial pilot who brought the message, Bodhi Rook (Riz Ahmed), and a pair of local warriors, flee as the Empire's Death Star, an armored battle station the size of a small moon, destroys Jedha City.

They track Galen to his research facility on Eadu, where he and Jyn are briefly reunited just before he dies in a Rebel attack. Galvanized, Jyn proposes a mission to steal the schematics for the Death Star, stored on the planet Scarif, but the council of Rebel leaders does not support it. Nevertheless, Jyn and a team of Rebel volunteers sneak away under the callsign "Rogue One" to infiltrate the Imperial facility on Scarif. She and Andor succeed in stealing and transmitting the plans, but the Death Star fires on the planet near the base. Jyn and Cassian embrace each other as they are engulfed by a fireball and killed.

Chris Barsanti of PopMatters noted that "Jyn's backstory also helps answer a question that's plagued fans ever since 1977: why did the Empire spend all that time and all those resources building a moon-sized space station only to leave one rather glaring and easily exploited vulnerability?"

=== Animated series ===
==== Forces of Destiny ====
Jyn is also featured in Star Wars Forces of Destiny, an animated web series focusing on the franchise's heroines including Princess Leia and Ahsoka Tano. In the episode "The Stranger", Jyn witnesses a little girl's cat being confiscated by stormtroopers. Jyn intervenes, snatching the pet and leading the pursuing stormtroopers to fall into a drain, and then returns the cat to the girl. Jyn reappears in the series in the episode, "Accidental Allies," where she encounters Sabine Wren from Star Wars Rebels. During the episode, Jyn picks up a holo-map stolen by Sabine that contains crucial intelligence, but is forced to flee when stormtroopers mistake Jyn as the actual thief. When Sabine realizes she has lost the map, she helps Jyn evade the stormtroopers and shares her own experience of working alone to persuade Jyn to give her the map. After some reflection, Jyn agrees and the women part ways. Jyn reappears once more in the episode "Jyn's Trade", where she helps a young thief learn a valuable life lesson. She was voiced by Felicity Jones in the first season and Helen Sadler in the second season.

=== Related works and merchandising ===
Jyn is a playable character in the 2015 action shooter video game Star Wars Battlefront, as part of the 2016 downloadable content (DLC) Rogue One: Scarif expansion pack. She is voiced by Helen Sadler. Jyn also appears as a character in the strategy video game Star Wars: Force Arena.

== Reception ==
A. O. Scott of The New York Times wrote, "Felicity Jones is a fine addition to the Star Wars tradition of tough-minded, quick-thinking heroines." Peter Bradshaw of The Guardian noted that "Jones is in the tousled-yet-game tradition of Star Wars female leads, like Carrie Fisher or Daisy Ridley: well-born but determined, with a sense of purpose befitting an heiress, if not a princess." Peter Travers of Rolling Stone called Jones "smashing" and her Jyn "a female warrior to rank with the great ones", and Justin Chang of the Los Angeles Times praised Jones for her "sympathetic ferocity" in the role. IndieWire's David Ehrlich compared Jyn to Rey (Ridley) from The Force Awakens, and described her as "indistinguishable from the bland and plucky heroine of Episode VII save for her privileged disillusionment".

Chris Nashawaty of Entertainment Weekly called Jyn "the kind role model any moviegoing parent would want to expose their daughters (and sons) to", adding that "Jones plays her with a fiery warmth that turns her into more than just a pawn piece going through the larger storytelling paces. She makes her human." Ann Hornaday of The Washington Post wrote that "Jones presents a convincing, if monotonously self-serious, heroine", noting the actress' physical resemblance to Ridley and speculating that their characters could be related. The Hollywood Reporter's Graeme McMillan criticized the character for her passive role in the film's plot, calling her "a void where the movie's heart should live". McMillan speculated that the character was a possible "casualty" of Rogue One's reshoots.
