= Felicity Jones =

British actress (born 1983)

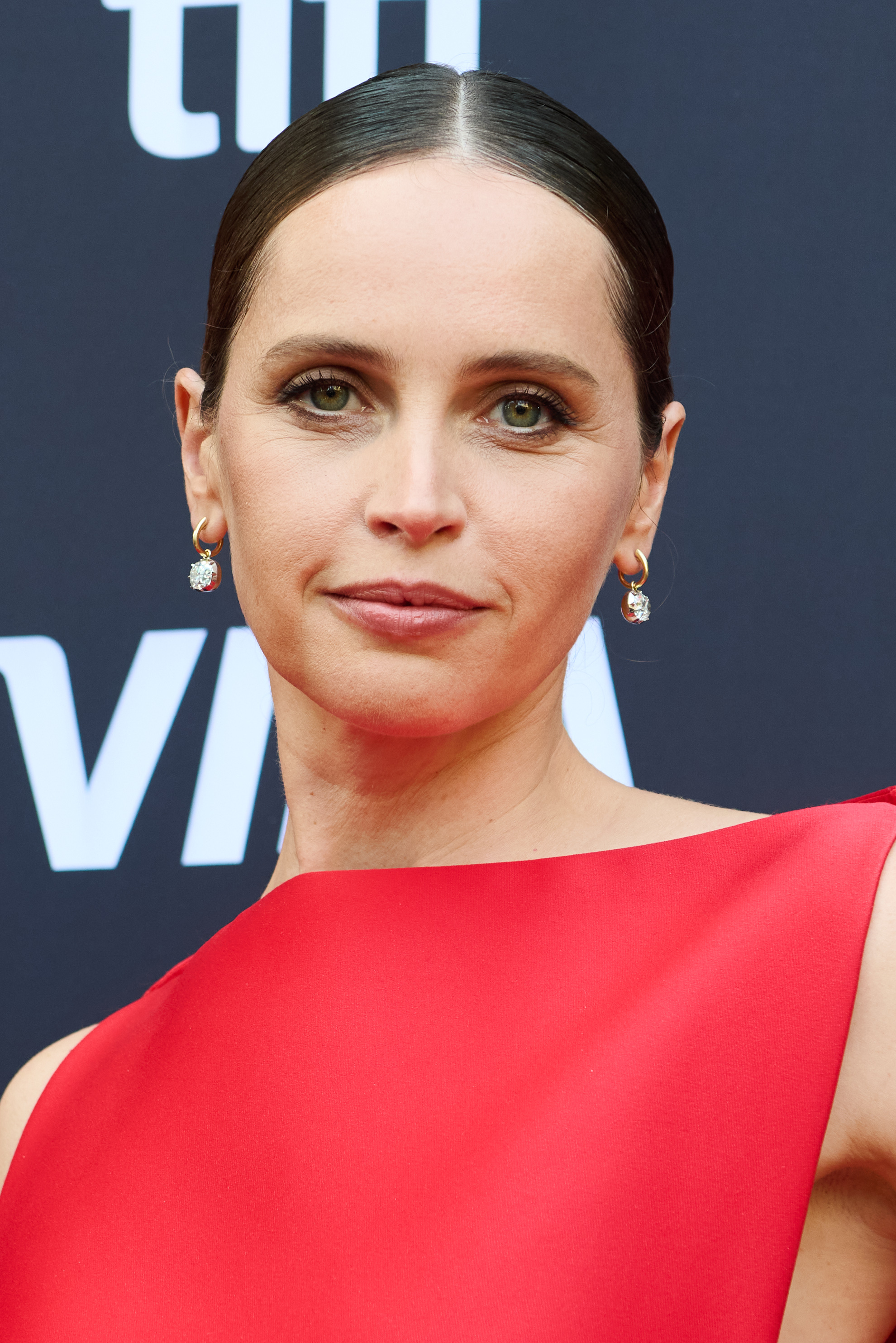
- Jones at the 2025 Toronto International Film Festival
- Born: Felicity Rose Hadley Jones; 17 October 1983 (age 42); Birmingham, England
- Education: Wadham College, Oxford
- Occupation: Actress
- Years active: 1996–present
- Works: Full list
- Spouse: Charles Guard (m. 2018)
- Children: 2
- Awards: Full list

Felicity Rose Hadley Jones (born 17 October 1983) is an English actress. She began acting as a child, appearing in The Treasure Seekers (1996) and playing Ethel Hallow for one series of the television series The Worst Witch (1998). She then starred in the Donmar Warehouse production of The Chalk Garden (2008).

Jones received praise for her performances as an exchange student in the romantic drama Like Crazy (2011), teacher Jane Hawking in the biopic The Theory of Everything (2014), and a Holocaust survivor in the period drama The Brutalist (2024). The latter two performances received Academy Award nominations for Best Actress and Best Supporting Actress, respectively. She also portrayed Jyn Erso in the space opera Rogue One: A Star Wars Story (2016) and Ruth Bader Ginsburg in the biopic On the Basis of Sex (2018).

Jones's other films include the superhero feature The Amazing Spider-Man 2 (2014), the thrillers True Story (2015) and Inferno (2016), the fantasy drama A Monster Calls (2016), and the streaming films The Aeronauts (2019), The Midnight Sky (2020) and The Last Letter from Your Lover (2021). She starred in Train Dreams (2025), which was nominated for the Academy Award for Best Picture.

== Early life and education ==
Felicity Rose Hadley Jones was born in Birmingham on 17 October 1983, and grew up in Bournville. Her mother worked in advertising and her father was a journalist. They separated when she was three years old and she and her elder brother lived with their mother.

One of her great-great-grandmothers was Italian and hailed from Lucca. Her uncle Michael Hadley is also an actor, which prompted Jones's interest in acting as a child.

After Kings Norton Girls' School, Jones attended King Edward VI Handsworth School, to complete A-levels and went on to take a gap year (during which she appeared in the BBC series Servants). She then studied English at Wadham College, Oxford. She appeared in student plays, including Attis in which she played the titular role, and, in 2005, Shakespeare's The Comedy of Errors for the Oxford University Dramatic Society summer tour to Japan, starring alongside Harry Lloyd.

== Career ==
Jones began acting at the age of 11 at after-school workshop Central Junior Television, which was funded by Central Television. At age 14, she appeared in the first series of The Worst Witch. When Weirdsister College began in 2001, Jones returned as Hallow. Her longest-running role around this time was on the BBC Radio 4 soap opera The Archers, where she played Emma Carter until 2009.

In 2003, she starred as Grace May in the BBC drama Servants. She took the leading role in the 2007 ITV adaptation of Jane Austen's Northanger Abbey, and starred in Polly Stenham's That Face at the Royal Court Theatre in April 2007.

In 2008, Jones appeared in the films Brideshead Revisited and Flashbacks of a Fool, the Doctor Who episode "The Unicorn and the Wasp" and a revival of Enid Bagnold's The Chalk Garden at the Donmar Warehouse theatre in London. In January 2009, the five-part TV serial The Diary of Anne Frank, in which Jones played the role of Margot Frank alongside Tamsin Greig (as Edith Frank-Holländer) and Iain Glen (as Otto Frank), was broadcast on BBC One. Later that year in May, she performed in a rehearsed reading of Anthony Minghella's Hang Up at the High Tide Festival. Jones played the role of Julie in Ricky Gervais and Stephen Merchant's 2010 film Cemetery Junction. She appeared in Soulboy and in Julie Taymor's big screen adaptation of The Tempest as Miranda.

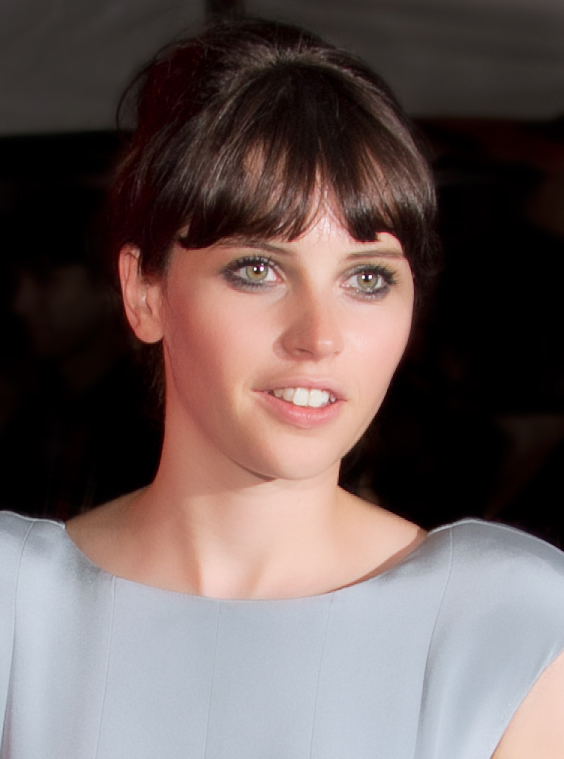
Jones at the 2011 Toronto International Film Festival

On 29 January 2011, Jones won a Special Jury Prize (Dramatic) at the Sundance Film Festival for her performance as Anna in Drake Doremus's Like Crazy. For the film, Jones did her own hair and make-up and improvised her dialogue. Her performance earned comparisons to Carey Mulligan's Academy Award-nominated role in An Education. She received the Best New Hollywood Award for this film at the 2011 Hollywood Film Awards.

Jones appeared alongside Ed Westwick in Chalet Girl, a romantic comedy released in March 2011, for which she had to undergo two months of snowboarding training and work undercover in a chalet at St Anton, scrubbing toilets and partying at the Krazy Kanguruh bar in preparation for the role. Jones said that the role was "something of a relief" after a string of costume roles and she was also keen to take on a comic role. Jones performed in Luise Miller, a new translation of Schiller's Kabale und Liebe by Mike Poulton at the Donmar Warehouse theatre in London, in June and July 2011. Jones lived with a Catholic family and attended Mass to prepare for the role. In 2011, Jones was announced as the new face of Burberry. In November, she was also announced as the new face of Dolce & Gabbana.

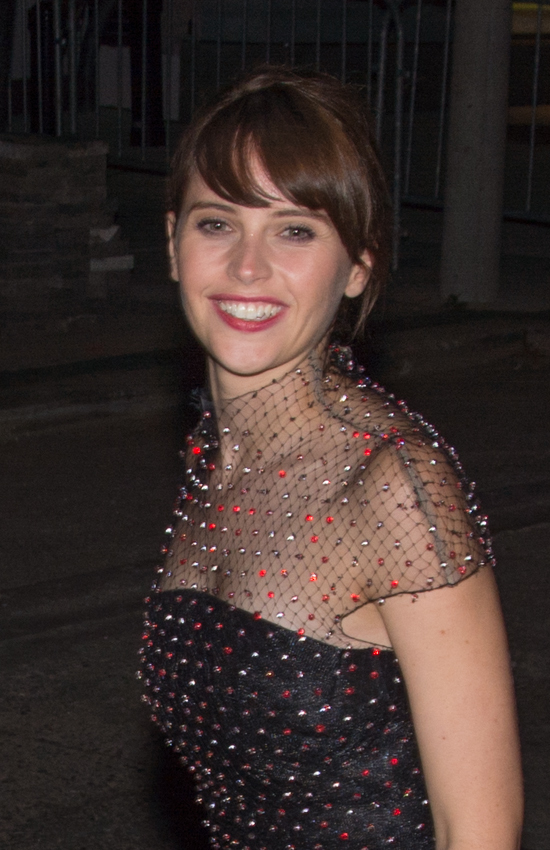
Jones arriving for the Hollywood Foreign Press Association and InStyle 2014 TIFF Celebration

In 2013, Jones portrayed Ellen Ternan in The Invisible Woman. Jones, previously unfamiliar with Ternan, learned about her life through research, and reflected that she knew she was "in for a challenge" when choosing to work on the film, citing the experience of director Ralph Fiennes and how "methodically done" his performance was. She appeared in The Amazing Spider-Man 2, which was released on 2 May 2014. She played Felicia Hardy; an assistant of Harry Osborn. Jones signed on due to its difference from her previous works.

In 2014, Jones portrayed Jane Wilde Hawking in the film The Theory of Everything, a biopic charting the life and love between Wilde Hawking and physicist Stephen Hawking, with Eddie Redmayne starring as Hawking. After being given the script by her agent, Jones read it in its entirety in one sitting, and said that she enjoyed that it was a "love story and not a straightforward biopic." She auditioned for the film and its director, James Marsh, offered her the part immediately after. Jones met with Jane Hawking in preparing for the role. Jane Hawking was so impressed by the portrayal she wondered if it was herself when watching Jones. For her role as Jane, she received nominations for the Academy Award for Best Actress, the BAFTA Award for Best Actress in a Leading Role, the Critics' Choice Movie Award for Best Actress, the Golden Globe Award for Best Actress in a Motion Picture – Drama, and the Screen Actors Guild Award for Outstanding Performance by a Female Actor in a Leading Role.

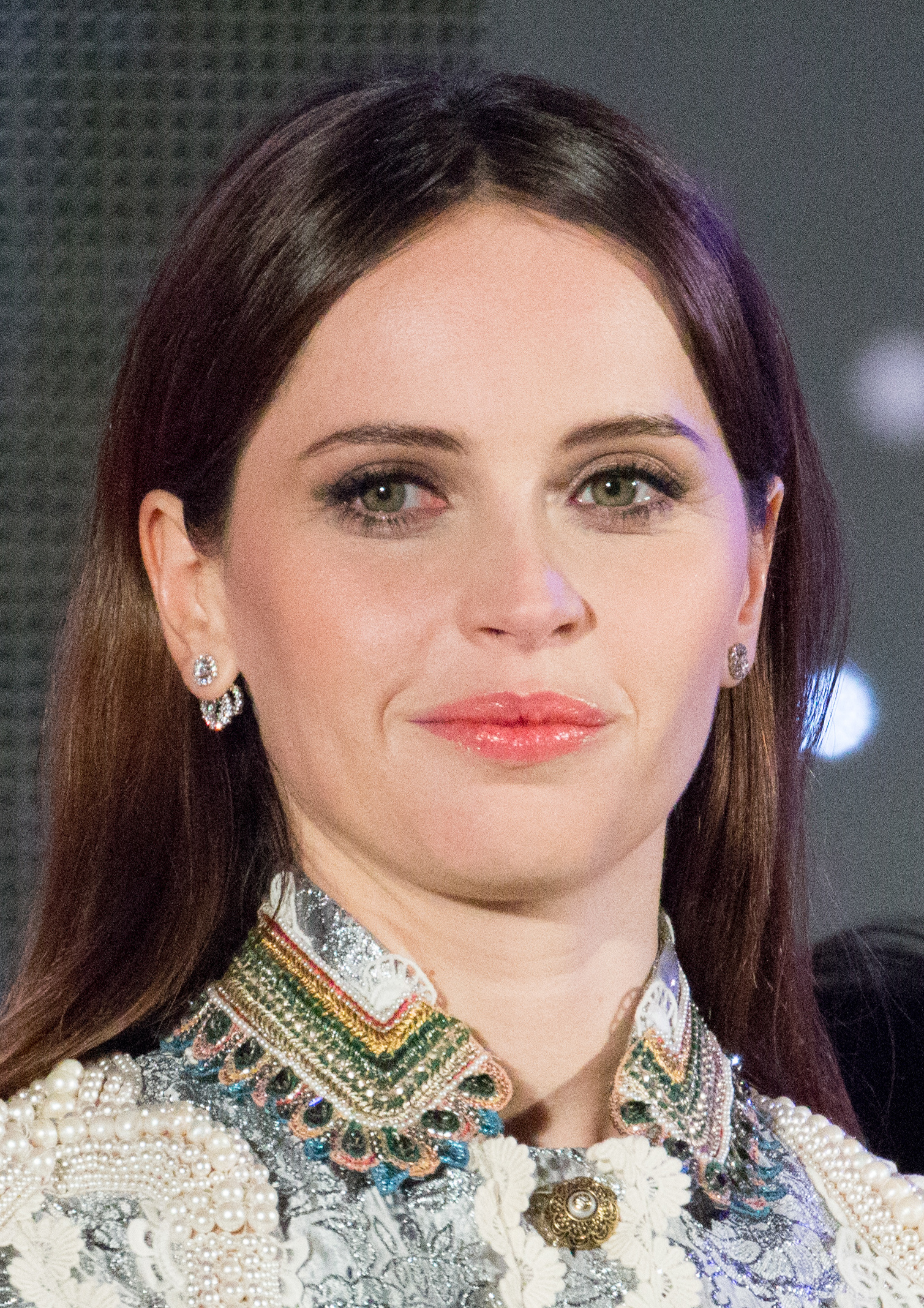
Jones in 2016

In February 2015, she was cast as Jyn Erso in the Star Wars stand-alone film Rogue One, with Gareth Edwards directing. Jones's agent recommended the role to her, and she enjoyed the character's search for an identity, drawing inspiration in her movements from Ronda Rousey. The film was released in December 2016 to positive reviews and grossed over $1 billion at the box office. Also in 2016, Jones starred in Inferno, playing a doctor aiding Robert Langdon in his escape. After agreeing to the role, she visited museums and galleries to understand her character better. Jones enjoyed the chemistry between her and Tom Hanks's characters as well as Inferno's overall diversity.

In 2017, Jones was announced as a global brand ambassador for Clé de Peau Beauté.

In late 2018, Jones starred in On the Basis of Sex, a biography of United States Supreme Court Justice Ruth Bader Ginsburg, directed by Mimi Leder and co-starring Armie Hammer and Justin Theroux. She reunited on-screen with Redmayne in the biographical adventure The Aeronauts (2019), joined George Clooney in Netflix's science fiction film The Midnight Sky (2020), and starred in the romantic drama The Last Letter from Your Lover (2021), an adaptation of Jojo Moyes' 2011 novel of the same name.

Jones starred in the thriller Dead Shot, alongside Aml Ameen, Mark Strong and Sophia Brown, in 2023. In May 2022, it was announced that she would lead Simon Amstell's comedy Maria, co-starring Jonathan Bailey. However, both Jones and Bailey were reported as having departed from the project in April 2024. Jones appeared in the 2024 film The Brutalist, portraying the Holocaust-survivor wife of the central character, for which she received a nomination for the Academy Award for Best Supporting Actress.

== Personal life ==
Jones met artist Ed Fornieles at Oxford when he was at the Ruskin School of Art, and they dated from 2003 to 2013.

In 2015, Jones began a relationship with director Charles Guard. They became engaged in May 2017 and married in June 2018. They have two children: a son born in 2020 and a daughter in 2022.

== See also ==
- List of Academy Award winners and nominees from Great Britain
- List of actors with Academy Award nominations
- List of actors with more than one Academy Award nomination in the acting categories
- List of actors nominated for Academy Awards for non-English performances
- List of British actors
