= The Treasure Seekers (1996 film) =

1996 television film directed by Juliet May

- Based on: The Story of the Treasure Seekers by E. Nesbit
- Screenplay by: Olivia Hetreed
- Directed by: Juliet May
- Starring: Camilla Power; Felicity Jones; Kristopher Milnes; Patsy Byrne; Nicholas Farrell; Peter Capaldi
- Music by: Tony Flynn

Production
- Producer: Alan Horrox
- Editor: Michael Pike
- Running time: 97 minutes

Original release
- Release: 25 December 1996

The Treasure Seekers is a 1996 British television family film directed by Juliet May and starring Camilla Power, Felicity Jones and Kristopher Milnes. In Edwardian Britain, a family have only a few days to raise enough money to stop their home being repossessed. It is based on the 1899 novel The Story of the Treasure Seekers by E. Nesbit.

== Cast ==
- Patsy Byrne – Eliza
- Peter Capaldi – Jellicoe
- Nigel Davenport – Lord Blackstock
- Nicholas Farrell – Richard Bastable
- William Forde – H.O. Bastable
- Tom Georgeson – Bates
- Alexander Harding – Albert-Next-Door
- Felicity Jones – Alice Bastable
- Keira Knightley – The Princess
- Gina McKee – Mary Leslie
- Kristopher Milnes – Oswald Bastable
- Camilla Power – Dora Bastable
- Ian Richardson – Haig
- Ben Simpson – Noel Bastable
- Roger Sloman – Wiggins
- James Wilby – Henry Carlisle (Albert's uncle)
