= The Theory of Everything (2014 film) =

2014 film by James Marsh

- Theatrical release poster
- Directed by: James Marsh
- Screenplay by: Anthony McCarten
- Based on: Travelling to Infinity: My Life with Stephen by Jane Hawking
- Produced by: Tim Bevan; Eric Fellner; Lisa Bruce; Anthony McCarten
- Starring: Eddie Redmayne; Felicity Jones; Charlie Cox; Emily Watson; Simon McBurney; David Thewlis
- Cinematography: Benoît Delhomme
- Edited by: Jinx Godfrey
- Music by: Jóhann Jóhannsson
- Production company: Working Title Films
- Distributed by: Focus Features (United States); Toho-Towa (Japan); Universal Pictures (International)
- Release dates: 7 September 2014 (TIFF); 26 November 2014 (United States); 1 January 2015 (United Kingdom); 13 March 2015 (Japan)
- Running time: 123 minutes
- Countries: United Kingdom; Japan; United States
- Language: English
- Budget: $15 million
- Box office: $123.7 million

The Theory of Everything is a 2014 biographical drama film produced by Working Title Films and directed by James Marsh. Set at the University of Cambridge, it details three decades of the life of the theoretical physicist Stephen Hawking. It was adapted by Anthony McCarten from the 2007 memoir Travelling to Infinity: My Life with Stephen by Jane Hawking, which deals with her relationship with her ex-husband Stephen Hawking, his diagnosis of motor neurone disease – also known as amyotrophic lateral sclerosis (ALS) – and his success in the field of physics. The film stars Eddie Redmayne and Felicity Jones, with Charlie Cox, Emily Watson, Simon McBurney, Christian McKay, Harry Lloyd, and David Thewlis featured in supporting roles. The film had its world premiere at the 2014 Toronto International Film Festival on 7 September 2014. It had its UK premiere on 1 January 2015.

The film received positive reviews, with praise for the musical score by Jóhann Jóhannsson, the cinematography by Benoît Delhomme, and the performances of Jones and Redmayne. It was also a global box office success, grossing US$123 million against a US$15 million production budget. The film gained numerous awards and nominations, including five Academy Award nominations: Best Picture, Best Actress (Jones), Best Adapted Screenplay, Best Original Score (Jóhannsson) and won Best Actor for Redmayne. The film received 10 British Academy Film Awards (BAFTA) nominations, and won Outstanding British Film, Best Leading Actor for Redmayne, and Best Adapted Screenplay for McCarten. It received four Golden Globe Award nominations, winning the Golden Globe Award for Best Actor – Motion Picture Drama for Redmayne, and Best Original Score for Jóhannsson. It also received three Screen Actors Guild Awards nominations, and won the Screen Actors Guild Award for Outstanding Performance by a Male Actor in a Leading Role for Redmayne.

== Plot ==
In 1963, Stephen Hawking, a postgraduate astrophysics student at the University of Cambridge, begins a relationship with literature student Jane Wilde. Although Stephen is intelligent, both his friends and fellow academics are worried about his lack of a thesis topic. After attending a lecture by Roger Penrose on black holes with his advisor, Prof. Dennis Sciama, Stephen speculates that these might have been part of the universe's creation and decides on his thesis.

However, soon Stephen's muscles begin to fail, causing him to lose coordination. After a bad fall, he is diagnosed with early-onset progressive degenerative motor neurone disease (MND) that will eventually leave him unable to move, swallow, or even breathe. With no treatment options, he is given approximately two years to live. The doctor assures Stephen that his brain will not be affected, so his thoughts and intelligence will remain intact, but eventually, he will be unable to communicate with them. Stephen develops severe depression, becoming reclusive and focusing on his work. Jane confesses she loves him and that she intends to stay, even as his condition worsens. They marry and have their first son, Robert. Once his walking ability deteriorates, he begins using a wheelchair.

Inspired by Penrose's work on spacetime singularities at the centre of black holes, Stephen presents his doctoral thesis viva, extrapolating that a black hole created the universe in a Big Bang and it will end in a Big Crunch.

After the Hawkings have their daughter Lucy, Jane becomes frustrated having to focus on the children, as well as Stephen's slowly degenerating health while his fame increases, all at the expense of her academic work. Stephen tells her he will understand if she needs help.

In the 1970s, Jane joins a church choir, where she meets and becomes close friends with Jonathan, a widower. She employs him as Robert's piano teacher, and Jonathan befriends the entire family, helping Stephen with his illness, supporting Jane, and playing with the children. When Jane gives birth to another son, Timothy, Stephen's mother asks her if the baby is Jonathan's. This causes outrage and Jonathan is appalled, but when he and Jane are alone, they admit the depth of their feelings for each other. He distances himself from the family, but Stephen tells him that Jane needs him.

As the Lucasian Professor of Mathematics at Cambridge, Stephen goes on to develop a theory of the visibility of black holes that emit radiation, becoming a world-renowned physicist.

In the 1980s, while on holiday in Bordeaux, Stephen falls ill and is rushed to a hospital. The doctor informs Jane that he has pneumonia and the tracheotomy he needs to survive will leave him mute. She agrees to the surgery. Stephen learns to use a spelling board and uses it to communicate with his new nurse, Elaine Mason. He receives a computer with a built-in voice synthesizer and uses it to write a book, A Brief History of Time, which becomes an international best-seller.

In the late 1980s, Stephen tells Jane he has been invited to the United States to accept an award and will take Elaine with him. Jane faces the fact that the marriage has not been working, saying she "did her best", and they agree to divorce. While Stephen has fallen in love with Elaine, Jane and Jonathan reunite.

Stephen goes to deliver a public lecture where he sees a student drop a pen. He imagines getting up to return it, almost crying at the reminder of how his disease has affected him. He then gives a speech telling audiences to pursue their ambitions despite the harsh reality of life: "While there is life, there is hope."

On being made a member of the Order of the Companions of Honour in 1989, Stephen invites Jane to go with him to meet Queen Elizabeth II, where they share a happy day together with their three children.

An extended closing series of select moments from the film, shown in reverse, back to the moment Stephen first saw Jane – the reversal is reminiscent of Stephen's research methodology of reversing time to understand the beginning of the universe.

An epilogue reveals that A Brief History of Time has sold over ten million copies worldwide; Stephen declined an offer of a knighthood and has no plans to retire; Jane earned her PhD degree in medieval Spanish poetry and married Jonathan; and both Stephen and Jane remain friends, sharing three grandchildren.

== Cast ==
- Eddie Redmayne as Stephen Hawking
- Felicity Jones as Jane Wilde Hawking
- Charlie Cox as Jonathan Jones, Jane's second husband
- David Thewlis as Dennis Sciama
- Simon McBurney as Frank Hawking, Stephen's father
- Emily Watson as Beryl Wilde, Jane's mother
- Maxine Peake as Elaine Mason, Stephen's nurse
- Harry Lloyd as Brian, Hawking's room-mate
- Guy Oliver-Watts as George Wilde, Jane's father
- Abigail Cruttenden as Isobel Hawking, Stephen's mother
- Charlotte Hope as Phillipa Hawking, Stephen's sister
- Lucy Chappell as Mary Hawking, Stephen's sister
- Christian McKay as Roger Penrose
- Enzo Cilenti as Kip Thorne
- Georg Nikoloff as Isaak Khalatnikov
- Alice Orr-Ewing as Diana King, sister of Basil King, Stephen's friend
- Stephen Hawking provides his own, Equaliser-computerised voice
- Frank Leboeuf as Swiss doctor.
- Michael Marcus as Ellis, Hawking's friend
- Adam Godley as Senior doctor - Cambridge Hospital

== Production ==
=== Development ===
"That's really the essence of the story, it's a very unusual love story in a very strange environment, a very strange sort of landscape, and that is I think the abiding theme of the film. It is how these two characters, these two real people transcend all the complications and curveballs that life throws at them."

— James Marsh, speaking of the film's nature

Screenwriter Anthony McCarten had been interested in Hawking since reading his seminal 1988 book A Brief History of Time. In 2004, McCarten read Jane Hawking's first memoir, Music to Move the Stars: A Life with Stephen of 1999, and subsequently began writing a screenplay adaptation of the book, with no guarantees in place. He met with Jane at her home numerous times to discuss the project. After multiple redrafts, incorporating details from her second memoir Travelling to Infinity: My Life with Stephen of 2007, he was introduced to producer Lisa Bruce via their mutual ICM agent, Craig Bernstein in 2009.

Bruce spent three years with McCarten, further convincing Jane Hawking to agree to a film adaptation of her book, with Bruce stating, "It was a lot of conversation, many glasses of sherry, and many pots of tea". On 18 April 2013, James Marsh was confirmed to direct the film, with the shooting being based in Cambridge, and at other locations in the United Kingdom, with Eddie Redmayne courted to fill the male lead of the piece. On 23 June 2013, it was revealed that Felicity Jones was confirmed to play the film's female lead role opposite Redmayne. On 8 October 2013, it was confirmed that Emily Watson and David Thewlis had joined the cast and that Working Title's Tim Bevan, Eric Fellner, Lisa Bruce, and Anthony McCarten would be producing the piece.

Marsh had studied archival images to give the film its authenticity, stating, "When we had photographs and documentary footage of Stephen that related to our story, we tried to reproduce them as best we could". Redmayne met with Hawking himself, commenting, "Even now, when he's unable to move, you can still see such effervescence in his eyes". He described portraying Hawking on-screen as a "hefty" challenge, adding that, "The real problem with making a film is of course you don't shoot chronologically. So it was about having to really try and chart his physical deterioration [so] you can jump into it day-to-day, whilst at the same time keeping this spark and wit and humour that he has".

Redmayne spent six months researching Hawking's life, watching every piece of interview footage he could find of him. He studied Hawking's accent and speech patterns under dialect coach Julia Wilson-Dickson to prepare for the role. Marsh stated that what Redmayne had to do was not easy. "He had to take on enormous amounts of difficult preparation, as well as embracing the difficult physicality of the role. It's not just doing a disability. It's actually charting the course of an illness that erodes the body, and the mind has to project out from that erosion", he said. He added that Hawking gave him his blessing, and also revealed that, "[Hawking's] response was very positive, so much so that he offered to lend his voice, the real voice that he uses. The voice you hear in the latter part of the story is in fact Stephen's actual electronic voice as he uses it", he said. It was revealed to the Toronto International Film Festival (TIFF) audience that as the lights came up at a recent screening, a nurse had wiped a tear from Hawking's cheek.

Jane Hawking, speaking on BBC Radio 4's Woman's Hour, talked of meeting Jones several times while the latter prepared for the role. When Hawking saw the finished film, she was amazed to see that Jones had incorporated her mannerisms and speech patterns into her performance.

=== Filming ===
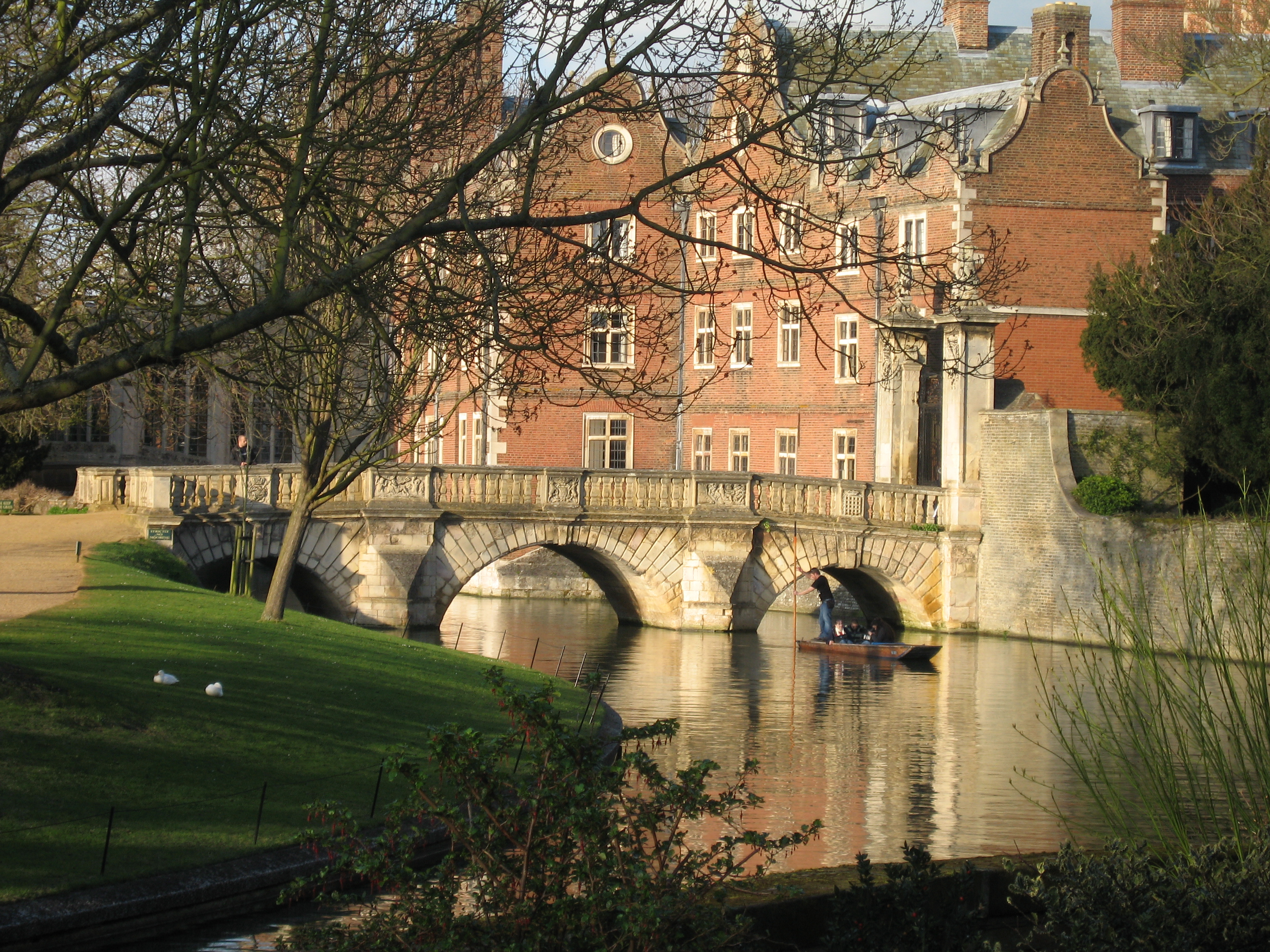
Part of the filming in Cambridge took place at St John's College.

Prior to the start of principal photography, Working Title had begun shooting on the lawn in front of the New Court building from 23 September 2013 to 27 September 2013; they filmed the Cambridge May Ball scene, set in 1963. On 24 September 2013, scenes were filmed at St John's College, The Backs in Queen's Road, and Queen's Green. The New Court lawn and Kitchen Bridge were featured places included in the location filming.

Principal photography began on 8 October 2013, with the location filming at the University of Cambridge, and at other places in Cambridgeshire and across the United Kingdom. The May Ball scene was also the last of the outdoor shoots, with filming in a lecture theatre the following day, and the remaining filming completed in the studio over the final five weeks of production.

The pyrotechnic specialists Titanium Fireworks, who developed the displays for the London 2012 Olympic Games, provided three identical firework displays for the May Ball scene at Trinity College, Cambridge.

=== Music ===
Composer Jóhann Jóhannsson scored The Theory of Everything. His score in the film has been described as including "[Jóhannsson's] signature blend of acoustic instruments and electronics". Jóhannsson commented that "it always involves the layers of live recordings, whether it's orchestra or a band or solo instrument, with electronics and more 'soundscapey' elements which can come from various sources". Jóhannsson's score was highly praised, being nominated for an Academy Award for Best Original Score, a BAFTA Award for Best Film Music, a Critics' Choice Movie Award for Best Score and a Grammy Award for Best Score Soundtrack for Visual Media, winning the Golden Globe Award for Best Original Score. The soundtrack was recorded at Abbey Road Studios.

The music that plays over the final scene of Hawking and his family in the garden and the reverse-flashback is "The Arrival of the Birds", composed and played by The Cinematic Orchestra, originally from the soundtrack to the 2008 nature documentary The Crimson Wing: Mystery of the Flamingos.

=== Post-production ===
During editing, filmmakers tried to remake Hawking's synthesised voice, but it did not turn out as they wanted. Hawking enjoyed the film enough that he granted them permission to use his own synthesised voice, which is heard in the final film.

== Historical accuracy ==
The film takes various dramatic liberties with the history it portrays. Writing for the film blog of UK daily newspaper The Guardian, Michelle Dean noted:

The Theory of Everything's marketing materials will tell you it is based on Jane Hawking's memoir of her marriage, a book published in the UK as Music to Move the Stars: A Life with Stephen, and then re-issued as Travelling to Infinity. But the screenwriters rearranged the facts to suit certain dramatic conventions. And while that always happens in these based-on-a-true-story films, the scale of the departure in The Theory of Everything is unusually wide. The film becomes almost dishonest – in a way that feels unfair to both parties, and oddly, particularly Jane Hawking herself.

In Slate, L.V. Anderson wrote that "the Stephen played by Eddie Redmayne is far gentler and more sensitive" than suggested in Travelling to Infinity. The Slate article further noted that the character Brian, Hawking's closest friend at Cambridge in the film, is not based on a real individual, but rather a composite of several of his real-life friends.

The film alters some of the details surrounding the beginning of Stephen and Jane's relationship, including how they met, as well as the fact that Jane knew about Stephen's disease before they started dating. Slate also comments that the film underplays Hawking's stubbornness and refusal to accept outside assistance for his disorder.

For The Guardian, Dean concluded by saying:

The movie presents the demise of their relationship as a beautiful, tear-soaked, mutually respectful conversation. Of course that didn't actually happen either. Jane's book describes a protracted breakup that comes to a head in a screaming fight on vacation. She also described devastation when Hawking announced by letter he was leaving her for his second wife, Elaine Mason. He ended up married to Mason for 10 years before that fell apart, and then he and Jane mended fences. Which, as it happens, the movie fudges too. It tries to present the rapprochement as coming when Hawking was made a Companion of Honour in 1989, but that actually happened before the couple separated.

Physicist Adrian Melott, a former student of Prof. Dennis Sciama, Hawking's doctoral supervisor portrayed in the film, strongly criticised the portrayal of Sciama in the film.

In the film, when Stephen attends the opera in Bordeaux, his companion was actually Raymond LaFlamme, his PhD student.

In the film, it is explained that Stephen's voice is taken from an answering machine. It is actually the voice of Dr Dennis H. Klatt.

== Release ==
On 8 October 2013, Universal Pictures International had acquired the rights to distribute the film internationally.

On 10 April 2014, Focus Features acquired the distribution rights to The Theory of Everything in the United States, with the plan of a 2014 limited theatrical release. Entertainment One Films picked up the Canadian distribution rights. The first trailer of the film was released on 7 August 2014. The Theory of Everything premiered at the Toronto International Film Festival (TIFF) on 7 September 2014, where it opened in the official sidebar section, Special Presentations. The film had a limited release in the United States on 7 November 2014, expanded in successive weeks to Taiwan, Austria, and Germany, ahead of the general release on 1 January 2015 in the United Kingdom, before being released throughout Europe.

== Reception ==
=== Box office ===
The Theory of Everything earned US$122,873,310 worldwide, with its biggest markets coming from North America (US$35.9 million), and the United Kingdom (US$31.9 million). The film had a North American limited release on 7 November 2014; it was released in five theatres, and earned $207,000 on its opening weekend, for an average of $41,400 per theatre. The film was then widely released on 26 November across 802 cinemas, earning US$5 million, and debuting at No. 7 at the box office. During its five-day US Thanksgiving week, the film earned $6.4 million.

=== Critical response ===
Film review aggregator Rotten Tomatoes reports an approval rating of 81% based on 273 reviews, with an average rating of 7.3/10. The site's critical consensus reads, "Part biopic, part love story, The Theory of Everything rises on James Marsh's polished direction and the strength of its two leads." Metacritic assigned the film a weighted average score of 71 out of 100, based on 47 critics, indicating "generally favorable reviews".

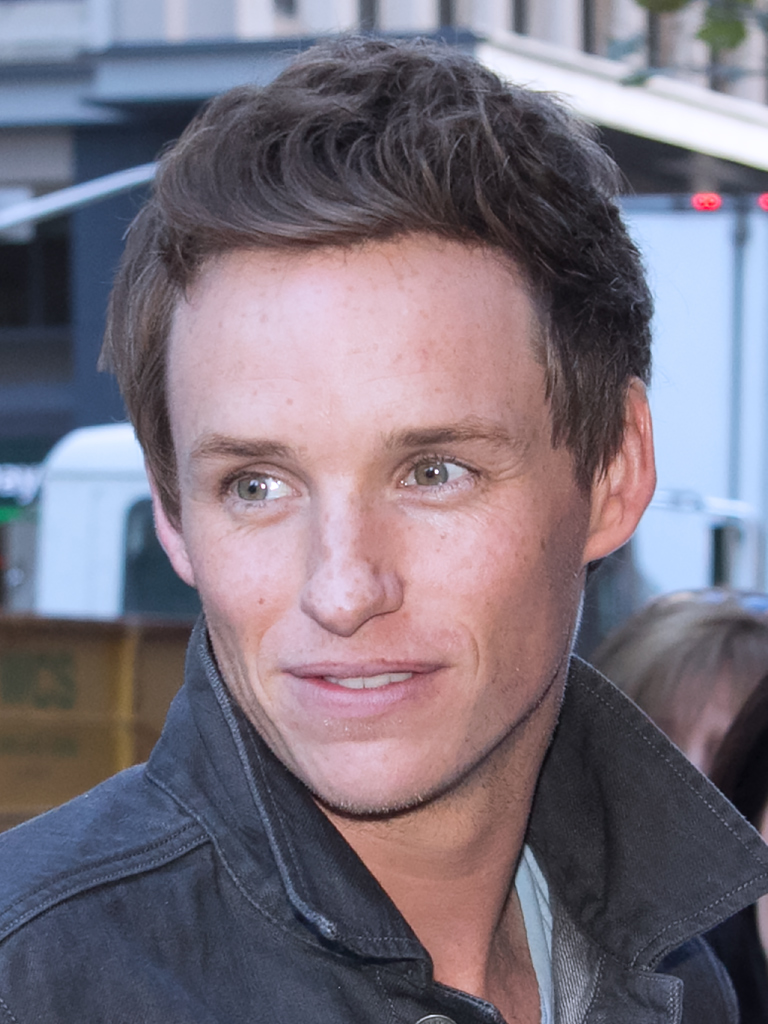
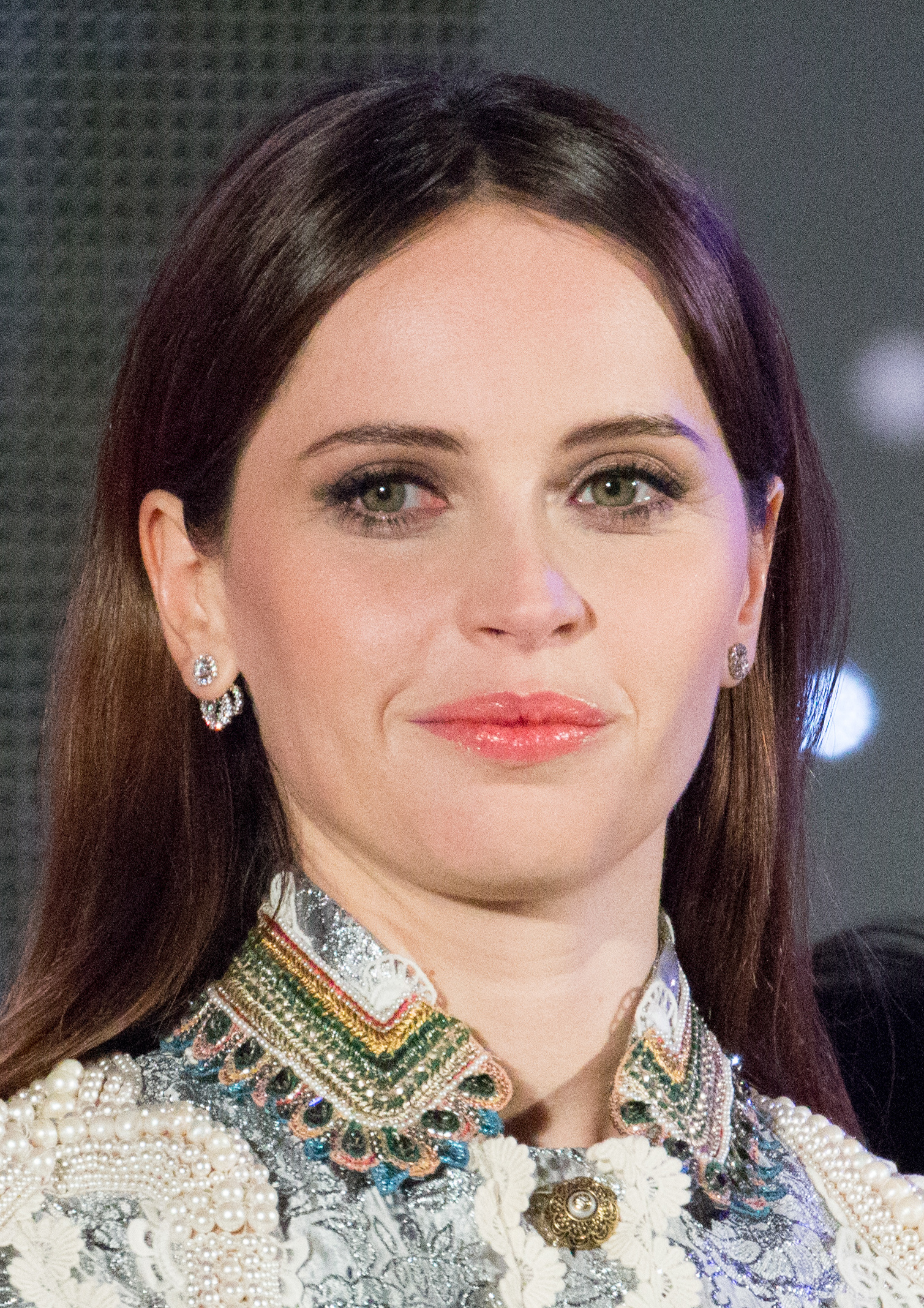
The performances of Eddie Redmayne and Felicity Jones garnered critical acclaim, earning them Academy Award nominations for Best Actor and Best Actress respectively, with Redmayne winning his category.

Catherine Shoard of The Guardian wrote, "Redmayne towers: this is an astonishing, genuinely visceral performance which bears comparison with Daniel Day-Lewis in My Left Foot". Justin Chang of Variety remarked, "A stirring and bittersweet love story, inflected with tasteful good humor...." He continued by praising the "superb performances" from Redmayne and Jones, as well commenting very positively about Jóhannsson's score, "whose arpeggio-like repetitions and progressions at times evoke the compositions of Philip Glass", whilst praising John Paul Kelly's production design, and Steven Noble's costumes. Leslie Felperin of The Hollywood Reporter remarked, "A solid, duly moving account of their complicated relationship, spanning roughly 25 years, and made with impeccable professional polish", praising Delhomme's cinematography as having "lush, intricately lit compositions", and adding "a splendor that keeps the film consistently watchable", and Jóhannsson's score as "dainty precision with a ineffable scientific quality about it". The Daily Telegraph's Tim Robey granted the film a positive review, stating that, "In its potted appraisal of Hawking's cosmology, The Theory of Everything bends over backwards to speak to the layman, and relies on plenty of second-hand inspiration. But it borrows from the right sources, this theory. And that's something", while praising Redmayne's performance, McCarten's script, and Delhomme's cinematography. Deadline Hollywood's Pete Hammond marked McCarten's script and Marsh's direction for praise, and of the film's Toronto reception, wrote: "To say the response here was rapturous would not be understating the enthusiasm I heard – not just from pundits, but also Academy voters with whom I spoke. One told me he came in with high expectations for a quality movie, and this one exceeded them".

The film was not without its detractors. Some criticised Marsh's focus on Hawking's romantic life over his scientific achievements. Alonso Duralde of The Wrap stated that "Hawking's innovations and refusal to subscribe to outdated modes of thinking merely underscore the utter conventionality of his film biography". Eric Kohn of Indiewire added that "James Marsh's biopic salutes the famous physicist's commitment, but falls short of exploring his brilliant ideas". Dennis Overbye of the New York Times noted:

The movie doesn't deserve any prizes for its drive-by muddling of Dr. Hawking's scientific work, leaving viewers in the dark about exactly why he is so famous. Instead of showing how he undermined traditional notions of space and time, it panders to religious sensibilities about what his work does or does not say about the existence of God, which in fact is very little.

Writing for The Guardian's film blog, Michelle Dean argues that the film does a disservice to Jane Wilde Hawking, by "rearrang[ing] the facts to suit certain dramatic conventions... The Theory of Everything is hell-bent on preserving the cliche".

The film's producers, writer, director Marsh, and actors Redmayne and Jones were widely favoured for award season success.

=== Accolades ===
The Theory of Everything received several awards and nominations following its release. At the 87th Academy Awards, it was nominated in the categories of Best Picture, Best Actor for Eddie Redmayne, Best Actress for Jones, Best Adapted Screenplay for McCarten, and Best Original Score for Jóhann Jóhannsson; with Eddie Redmayne winning the film's sole Academy Award for his performance. The film was nominated for ten British Academy Film Awards, (winning for Best Adapted Screenplay, Best British Film, and Best Actor), five Critics' Choice Movie Awards, and three Screen Actors Guild Awards. At the 72nd Golden Globe Awards, Redmayne won Best Actor – Motion Picture Drama, and Jóhannsson won Best Original Score. The film, and Jones were also nominated. Production designer John Paul Kelly earned a nomination for Excellence in Production Design for a Period Film from the Art Directors Guild, while the producers were nominated for Best Theatrical Motion Picture by the Producers Guild of America.

== See also ==
- List of films about mathematicians
